= 2007 in hip-hop =

This article summarizes the events, album releases, and album release dates in hip-hop for the year 2007.

== Albums ==
Release Date	Artist	Album	Label	Notes
January 9	Ultramagnetic MC's	The Best Kept Secret	DMAFT	
January 23	Melle Mel	Muscles	Power House Entertainment	
January 23	Pretty Ricky	Late Night Special	Atlantic Records, Bluestar Entertainment	Debuted at No. 1 on The Billboard 200; Singles: "On The Hotline", "Push It Baby"
January 23	Various Artists	Peanut Butter Wolf Presents Stones Throw: Ten Years	Stones Throw Records	
January 30	Sean Price	Jesus Price Superstar	Duck Down Music	Debuted at No. 196 on The Billboard 200
January 30	X Clan	Return from Mecca	Suburban Noize Records	
February 6	Mathematics & Wu-Tang Clan	Mathematics Presents Wu-Tang Clan & Friends Unreleased	Nature Sounds	
February 6	MC Eiht	Representin'		
February 6	Three 6 Mafia	The Prophet Returns		
February 20	Hell Razah	Renaissance Child	Nature Sounds	
February 20	Jin	ABC		
February 26	Hussein Fatal & Hardtimerz	1090 Official		Singles: "I'm Street", "1090 Official"
February 27	B.G. & Chopper City Boyz	We Got This		Debuted at No. 20 on The Billboard 200; Singles: "Make Em Mad"
February 27	Boss Hogg Outlawz	Serve & Collect	Koch Records	Debuted at No. 63 on The Billboard 200; Singles: "Woodgrain Wheel"
February 27	Famous Playaz (Noah23 & DS)	Funny Money	Legendary Entertainment, Plague Language	
February 27	Gabriel Teodros	Lovework		
February 27	Wisemen	Wisemen Approaching	Think Differently Music, Babygrande Records	
March 6	Consequence	Don't Quit Your Day Job!	GOOD Music, Columbia Records	Debuted at No. 113 on The Billboard 200
March 6	Twisted Black	Street Fame		
March 12	Noah23 & Lord Kufu	The Fool	Legendary Entertainment, Plague Language	
March 13	8Ball & MJG	Ridin High	Bad Boy Entertainment, Atlantic Records	Debuted at No. 8 on The Billboard 200; Singles: "Relax and Take Notes"
March 13	Black Milk	Popular Demand	Fat Beats Records	
March 13	Mobb Deep	The Infamous Archives	Streetcore Music	
March 20	Baby Boy Da Prince	Across the Water	Universal Republic Records	Debuted at No. 26 on The Billboard 200; Singles: "The Way I Live", "Naw Mean"
March 20	Crime Mob	Hated on Mostly	Reprise Records	Debuted at #31 on The Billboard 200; Singles: "Rock Yo Hips", "Circles"
March 20	Devin the Dude	Waitin' to Inhale	Rap-a-Lot Records	Debuted at No. 30 on The Billboard 200
March 20	El-P	I'll Sleep When You're Dead	Definitive Jux	Debuted at No. 78 on The Billboard 200
March 20	Evidence	The Weatherman LP	ABB Records	
March 20	Insane Clown Posse	The Tempest	Psychopathic Records	
March 20	Psycho Les	Psycho Therapy (The Soundtrack)		
March 27	Tha Dogg Pound	Dogg Chit	Gangsta Advisory Records, Koch Records	Debuted at No. 77 on The Billboard 200
March 27	Lil Flip	I Need Mine	Clover G Records	Debuted at No. 14 on The Billboard 200; Singles: "What It Do", "Ghetto Mindstate"
March 27	Mims	Music Is My Savior	American King Music, Disturbing tha Peace, Capitol Records	Debuted at No. 4 on The Billboard 200; Singles: "This Is Why I'm Hot", "Like This"
March 27	Buckwild	Buckwild: Diggin' in the Crates	Ground Floor Recordings	
March 27	Prodigy	Return of the Mac	Koch Records	Debuted at No. 32 on The Billboard 200
March 27	Redman	Red Gone Wild: Thee Album	Gilla House Records, Def Jam Recordings	Debuted at No. 13 on The Billboard 200
March 27	Rich Boy	Rich Boy	Interscope Records	Debuted at No. 3 on The Billboard 200; Singles: "Throw Some D's", "Boy Looka Here", "Good Things"
March 27	Young Buck	Buck the World	G-Unit Records, Interscope Records	Debuted at No. 3 on The Billboard 200; Singles: "I Know You Want Me", "Get Buck", "U Ain't Goin' Nowhere"
March 27	Big Quarters	Cost of Living		
April 3	Paul Wall	Get Money, Stay True	Swishahouse, Atlantic Records	Debuted at No. 8 on The Billboard 200; Singles: "Break 'Em Off", "I'm Throwed"
April 3	Phat Kat	Carte Blanche		
April 3	Romeo	Crush on U (soundtrack)	Little Big Records	
April 3	Suburban Noize Records	SRH Presents: Supporting Radical Habits Vol. II	Suburban Noize Records	
April 3	Timbaland	Shock Value	Mosley Music Group, Interscope	Debuted at No. 5 on The Billboard 200; Singles: "Give It to Me", "The Way I Are", "Apologize", "Scream"; Certified Platinum
April 10	Brother Ali	The Undisputed Truth	Rhymesayers Entertainment	Debuted at No. 69 on The Billboard 200
April 10	Mic Geronimo	Alive 9/14/73		
April 24	Joell Ortiz	The Brick (Bodega Chronicles)	Koch Records	
April 24	Kingspade	P.T.B.	Suburban Noize Records	
April 24	Kurtis Blow	Kurtis Blow Presents: Hip Hop Ministry	Holy Hip Hop/EMI Christian Music	
April 24	Lifesavas	Gutterfly	Quannum Projects	
April 24	Snoop Dogg	Snoop Dogg Presents The Big Squeeze	Doggystyle Records, Koch Records	
April 24	Various Artists	Stomp the Yard (soundtrack)	Artists' Addiction Records	
May 1	Boondox	PunkinHed	Psychopathic Records	
May 8	Bone Thugs-n-Harmony	Strength & Loyalty	Full Surface Records, Interscope Records	Debuted at No. 2 on The Billboard 200; Singles: "I Tried", "Lil L.O.V.E."; Certified Gold
May 8	DJ Jazzy Jeff	The Return of the Magnificent	BBE Records	
May 8	Sage Francis	Human the Death Dance	Epitaph Records	
May 15	Marco Polo	Port Authority	Soulspazm Records, Rawkus Records	
May 15	Romeo	Gutta Music All-Stars	Guttar Music Group, UrbanDigital Media Group, GoDigital Media Group	
May 22	Ca$his	The County Hound EP	Shady Records, Interscope Records, G's Up	Debuted at No. 106 on The Billboard 200; Singles: "'Lac Motion"
May 22	KRS-One & Marley Marl	Hip Hop Lives	Koch Records	Debuted at No. 140 on The Billboard 200
May 22	Trill Fam, Lil Boosie, Webbie and Foxx	Trill Entertainment Presents: Survival of the Fittest	Trill Entertainment	
May 22	U.S.D.A.	Cold Summer	CTE World, Def Jam Recordings	Debuted at No. 4 on The Billboard 200; Singles: "White Girl", "Corporate Thuggin"
May 23	Hilltop Hoods	The Hard Road: Restrung	Obese Records	
June 5	Lil Wyte	The One and Only	Hypnotize Minds	Debuted at No. 46 on The Billboard 200
June 12	Blue Scholars	Bayani		
June 12	Canibus	For Whom the Beat Tolls		
June 12	Cilvaringz	I	Mic Club Music	
June 12	DJ Khaled	We the Best	Terror Squad Entertainment, Koch Records	Debuted at No. 8 on The Billboard 200; Singles: "We Takin' Over", "I'm So Hood"
June 12	Fabolous	From Nothin' to Somethin'	Desert Storm Records, Def Jam Recordings	Debuted at No. 2 on The Billboard 200; Singles: "Diamonds", "Return of the Hustle", "Make Me Better", "Baby Don't Go"; Certified Gold
June 19	SHOP BOYZ	Rockstar Mentality	Universal Republic Records	Debuted at No. 11 on The Billboard 200; Singles: "Party Like a Rockstar", "They Like Me"
June 19	Tragedy Khadafi	The Death of Tragedy		
June 26	Pharoahe Monch	Desire	SRC Records; Universal Motown Records	Debuted at No. 58 on The Billboard 200
July 3	Pastor Troy	Tool Muziq		Debuted at No. 91 on The Billboard 200
July 3	T.I.	T.I. vs. T.I.P.	Grand Hustle Records, Atlantic Records	Debuted at No. 1 on The Billboard 200; Singles: "Big Things Poppin' (Do It)", "You Know What It Is", "Hurt"; Certified Platinum
July 3	Twiztid	Independents Day	Psychopathic Records	
July 17	Blu & Exile	Below the Heavens	Sound in Color	
July 17	Danny!	Danny Is Dead		
July 17	Hed PE	Insomnia	Suburban Noize Records	
July 17	Tech N9ne	Misery Loves Kompany	Strange Music, RBC Records, Fontana Distribution	
July 24	Camp Lo	Black Hollywood	Good Hands	
July 24	Yung Berg	Almost Famous: The Sexy Lady EP	Epic Records	Debuted at No. 32 on The Billboard 200; Singles: "Sexy Lady"
July 31	Common	Finding Forever	GOOD Music, Geffen Records	Debuted at No. 1 on The Billboard 200; Singles: "The Game", "The People", "Drivin' Me Wild", "I Want You"; Certified Gold; Only chart-topping album of 2007 without a single to chart on The Billboard 100
July 31	Kia Shine	Due Season		Debuted at No. 84 on The Billboard 200; Singles: "Krispy", "WOW"
July 31	Guru	Guru's Jazzmatazz, Vol. 4: The Hip Hop Jazz Messenger: Back to the Future	7 Grand	
July 31	Death Row Records	Death Row: The Singles Collection	Death Row Records	
July 31	Various Artists	Bratz: Motion Picture Soundtrack	Geffen Records	
August 7	Plies	The Real Testament		Debuted at No. 2 on The Billboard 200, selling 96,000 units; Singles: "Shawty" & "Hypnotized", "I Am The Club"; Certified Gold
August 7	Psychopathic Rydas	Duk Da Fuk Down	Joe & Joey Records	
August 7	UGK	Underground Kingz	Jive Records	Debuted at No. 1 on The Billboard 200; Singles: "The Game Belongs to Me", "International Players Anthem"; Certified Gold
August 14	Boot Camp Clik	Casualties of War	Duck Down Music	
August 14	Danny Diablo	Thugcore 4 Life	Suburban Noize Records, Epitaph Records	
August 14	WC	Guilty by Affiliation	Lench Mob Records	Debuted at No. 49 on The Billboard 200
August 20	Insane Clown Posse	Eye of the Storm	Psychopathic Records	
August 21	Atmosphere	Sad Clown Bad Summer 9	Rhymesayers Entertainment	
August 21	Blaze Ya Dead Homie	Clockwork Gray	Psychopathic Records	
August 21	Brand Nubian	Time's Runnin' Out		
August 21	Killah Priest	The Offering		
August 21	Swizz Beatz	One Man Band Man	Full Surface Records, Universal Motown Records	Debuted at No. 7 on The Billboard 200; Singles: "It's Me Bitches", "Money in the Bank", "Top Down"
August 21	Talib Kweli	Eardrum	Blacksmith Records, Warner Bros. Records	Debuted at No. 2 on The Billboard 200
August 28	Aesop Rock	None Shall Pass	Definitive Jux	
August 28	Big B	More to Hate	Suburban Noize Records	
August 28	Kottonmouth Kings	Cloud Nine	Suburban Noize Records	
August 28	Strong Arm Steady	Deep Hearted		
August 28	Yung Joc	Hustlenomic$	Bad Boy Entertainment, Atlantic Records	Debuted at No. 3 on The Billboard 200; Singles: "Coffee Shop", "Bottle Poppin'"
September 4	Master P & Romeo	Master P & Romeo: Hip Hop History		Does not contain "Parental Advisory" sticker
September 11	50 Cent	Curtis	G-Unit Records, Shady Records, Aftermath Entertainment, Interscope Records	Debuted at No. 2 on The Billboard 200; Singles:"Straight to the Bank", "Amusement Park, "I Get Money", "Ayo Technology", "I'll Still Kill"; Certified Platinum
September 11	Grayskul	Bloody Radio	Rhymesayers Entertainment	
September 11	Kanye West	Graduation	Roc-A-Fella Records, Def Jam Recordings	Debuted at No. 1 on The Billboard 200; Singles: "Can't Tell Me Nothing", "Stronger", "Good Life", "Flashing Lights", "Homecoming"; Certified 5× Platinum
September 11	Necro	Death Rap	Psycho+Logical-Records, Koch Records	
September 11	Young Noble & Hussein Fatal	Thug in Thug Out		
September 14	Chamillionaire	Ultimate Victory	Chamillitary Entertainment, Universal Records	Debuted at No. 8 on The Billboard 200; Does not contain "Parental Advisory" sticker; Singles: "Hip Hop Police"
September 18	Havoc	The Kush	Nature Sounds	Debuted at No. 173 on The Billboard 200; Singles: "I'm the Boss"
September 18	Percee P	Perseverance	Stones Throw Records	
September 18	Twista	Adrenaline Rush 2007	Atlantic Records	Debuted at No. 10 on The Billboard 200; Singles: "Give It Up"
September 25	Army of the Pharaohs	Ritual of Battle	Babygrande Records	
September 25	Gorilla Zoe	Welcome to the Zoo	Bad Boy Entertainment, Atlantic Records	Debuted at No. 18 on The Billboard 200; Singles: "Hood Figga"
October 2	Boyz n da Hood	Back Up n da Chevy	Bad Boy Entertainment, Atlantic Records	Debuted at No. 51 on The Billboard 200; Singles: "Everybody Know Me"
October 2	Soulja Boy	souljaboytellem.com	Stacks on Deck Entertainment, Collipark Music, Interscope Records	Debuted at No. 4 on The Billboard 200; Singles: "Crank That (Soulja Boy)", "Soulja Girl", "Yahhh!", "Let Me Get 'em", "Donk"; Does not contain "Parental Advisory" sticker; Certified Platinum
October 9	9th Wonder	The Dream Merchant Vol. 2	6 Hole Records, Caroline Distribution	
October 9	Y Society	Travel at Your Own Pace		
October 11	Gucci Mane	Trap-A-Thon	Tommy Boy Records	Debuted at No. 69 on The Billboard 200
October 23	Bizarre	Blue Cheese & Coney Island	Koch Records	
October 23	Hurricane Chris	51/50 Ratchet	Polo Grounds Music, J Records	Debuted at No. 24 on The Billboard 200; Singles: "A Bay Bay", "The Hand Clap", "Playas Rock"
October 23	Little Brother	Getback	ABB Records	Debuted at No. 89 on The Billboard 200
October 23	Shad	The Old Prince		
October 30	Baby Bash	Cyclone	Latium Records, E.D.D. Records, Arista Records, J Records	
October 30	Playaz Circle	Supply & Demand	Disturbing tha Peace, Def Jam Recordings	Debuted at No. 27 on The Billboard 200; Singles: "Duffle Bag Boy"
October 31	Twisted Insane	The Monster In The Dark	Brainsick Muzik	
November 1	Saul Williams	The Inevitable Rise and Liberation of NiggyTardust!	Fader Label	
November 6	Cassidy	B.A.R.S. The Barry Adrian Reese Story	Full Surface Records, J Records	Debuted at No. 10 on The Billboard 200; Singles: "My Drink N My 2 Step"
November 6	Jay-Z	American Gangster	Roc-A-Fella Records, Def Jam Recordings	Debuted at No. 1 on The Billboard 200; Singles: "Blue Magic", "Roc Boys", "I Know"; Certified Platinum
November 6	Nas	Greatest Hits	Columbia Records, Sony BMG	
November 12	Noah23	Cameo Therapy	Legendary Entertainment, Plague Language	
November 13	Bone Thugs-n-Harmony	T.H.U.G.S.	Ruthless Records	
November 13	Psychopathic Records	Psychopathics from Outer Space 3	Psychopathic Records	
November 20	Freeway	Free at Last	Roc-A-Fella Records, Def Jam Recordings	Debuted at No. 42 on The Billboard 200; Singles: "Lights Get Low"
November 27	Common	Thisisme Then: The Best of Common	Relativity Records/Legacy Records	
November 27	CunninLynguists	Dirty Acres	APOS Music	Received massive press coverage, including Okayplayer.com's "Most Slept On Artist" award.
November 27	Pitbull	The Boatlift	TVT Records, Poe Boy Entertainment	
December 4	DJ Drama	Gangsta Grillz: The Album	Grand Hustle Records, Atlantic Records	Debuted at No. 26 on The Billboard 200; Singles: "5000 Ones"
December 4	Ghostface Killah	The Big Doe Rehab	Def Jam Recordings	Debuted at No. 41 on The Billboard 200
December 4	Scarface	Made	Rap-A-Lot Records, Atlantic Records	Debuted at No. 17 on The Billboard 200; "Girl You Know"
December 4	Styles P	Super Gangster (Extraordinary Gentleman)	Ruff Ryders Entertainment, Koch Records	Debuted at No. 52 on The Billboard 200; Singles: "Blow Ya Mind"
December 4	Wyclef Jean	Carnival Vol. II: Memoirs of an Immigrant	Columbia Records	Debuted at No. 28 on The Billboard 200; Singles: "Sweetest Girl (Dollar Bill)"
December 11	Beanie Sigel	The Solution	Roc-A-Fella Records, Def Jam Recordings	Debuted at No. 37 on the Billboard 200; Singles: "All the Above"
December 11	Birdman	5 ★ Stunna	Cash Money Records, Universal Records	Debuted at No. 18 on the Billboard 200; Singles: "Pop Bottles", "100 Million", "I Run This"
December 11	Bow Wow & Omarion	Face Off	Columbia Records	
December 11	Gucci Mane	Back to the Trap House	Atlantic Records	Debuted at No. 32 at the Billboard 200
December 11	Hi-Tek	Hi-Teknology 3	Babygrande Records	
December 11	Wu-Tang Clan	8 Diagrams	SRC Records, Universal Motown Records	Debuted at No. 25 at the Billboard 200
December 18	Chingy	Hate It or Love It	Full Dekk Music Group, Disturbing tha Peace, Def Jam Recordings	Debuted at No. 84 at the Billboard 200; Singles: "Fly Like Me", "Gimme Dat"
December 18	Lupe Fiasco	Lupe Fiasco's The Cool	1st & 15th Entertainment, Atlantic Records	Debuted at No. 14 at the Billboard 200; Singles: "Superstar", "Hip Hop Saved My Life", "Paris, Tokyo"; Certified Gold

== Highest-charting singles ==
Hip hop singles from any year which charted in the 2007 Top 40 of the Billboard Hot 100
Song	Artist	Project	Peak position
"Stronger"	Kanye West	Graduation	1
"This Is Why I'm Hot"	Mims	Music Is My Savior	1
"Crank That (Soulja Boy)"	Soulja Boy	Souljaboytellem.com	1
"Give It to Me"	Timbaland featuring Nelly Furtado & Justin Timberlake	Shock Value	1
"Buy U a Drank (Shawty Snappin')"	T-Pain featuring Yung Joc	Epiphany	1
"Party Like a Rockstar"	SHOP BOYZ	Rockstar Mentality	2
"Ayo Technology"	50 Cent featuring Justin Timberlake & Timbaland	Curtis	5
"I Tried"	Bone Thugs-N-Harmony featuring Akon	Strength & Loyalty	6
"Pop, Lock & Drop It"	Huey	Notebook Paper	6
"Cyclone"	Baby Bash featuring T-Pain	Cyclone	7
"A Bay Bay"	Hurricane Chris	51/50 Ratchet	7
"Good Life"	Kanye West featuring T-Pain	Graduation	7
"Make Me Better"	Fabolous featuring Ne-Yo	From Nothin' to Somethin'	8
"Shawty"	Plies featuring T-Pain	The Real Testament	9
"Big Things Poppin' (Do It)"	T.I.	T.I. vs. T.I.P.	9
"On The Hotline"	Pretty Ricky	Late Night Special	12
"Make It Rain"	Fat Joe featuring Lil Wayne	Me, Myself & I	13
"Hypnotized"	Plies featuring Akon	The Real Testament	14
"Duffle Bag Boy"	Playaz Circle featuring Lil Wayne	Supply & Demand	15
"Go Getta"	Young Jeezy featuring R. Kelly	Thug Motivation 102: The Inspiration	18
"Sexy Lady"	Yung Berg featuring Junior	Almost Famous: The Sexy Lady EP & Look What You Made Me	18
"I'm So Hood"	DJ Khaled featuring T-Pain, Trick Daddy, Rick Ross & Plies	We the Best	19
"I Get Money"	50 Cent	Curtis	20
"Baby Don't Go"	Fabolous featuring Jermaine Dupri	From Nothin' to Somethin'	23
"2 Step"	Unk	Beat'n Down Yo Block!	24
"We Takin' Over"	DJ Khaled featuring T.I., Akon, Rick Ross, Fat Joe, Lil Wayne & Birdman	We the Best	28
"Top Back"	T.I.	King	29
"Straight To The Bank"	50 Cent	Curtis	32
"Like This"	Mims featuring Rasheeda	Music Is My Savior	32
"Soulja Girl"	Soulja Boy featuring I-15	Souljaboytellem.com	32
"My Drink n My 2 Step"	Cassidy featuring Swizz Beatz	B.A.R.S.	33
"You Know What It Is"	T.I. featuring Wyclef Jean	T.I. vs TIP	34

== Highest first week sales ==
As of December 31, 2007.

Number	Artist	Album	1st week sales	1st week position
1	Kanye West	Graduation	957,000	#1
2	50 Cent	Curtis	691,000	#2
3	T.I.	T.I. vs. T.I.P.	468,000	#1
4	Jay-Z	American Gangster	426,000	#1
5	UGK	Underground Kingz	160,000	#1
6	Fabolous	From Nothin' to Somethin'	159,000	#2
7	Common	Finding Forever	155,000	#1
8	Lupe Fiasco	The Cool	143,000	#14
9	Young Buck	Buck the World	141,000	#3
10	Timbaland	Shock Value	138,000	#1

== Highest critically reviewed albums (Metacritic) ==
Number	Artist	Album	Average score	Number of reviews	Reference
1	M.I.A.	Kala	87	37 reviews	
2	Jay-Z	American Gangster	83	25 reviews	
3	J Dilla	Ruff Draft	81	16 reviews	
4	EL-P	I'll Sleep When You're Dead	80	32 reviews	
5	Kanye West	Graduation	79	32 reviews	
6	Redman	Red Gone Wild: Thee Album	79	8 reviews	
7	Dizzee Rascal	Maths + English	78	19 reviews	
8	Sage Francis	Human the Death Dance	77	16 reviews	
9	Lupe Fiasco	The Cool	77	30 reviews	
10	Ghostface Killah	The Big Doe Rehab	77	29 reviews	

== See also ==
- Previous article: 2006 in hip-hop
- Next article: 2008 in hip-hop
