= Soulja Boy discography =

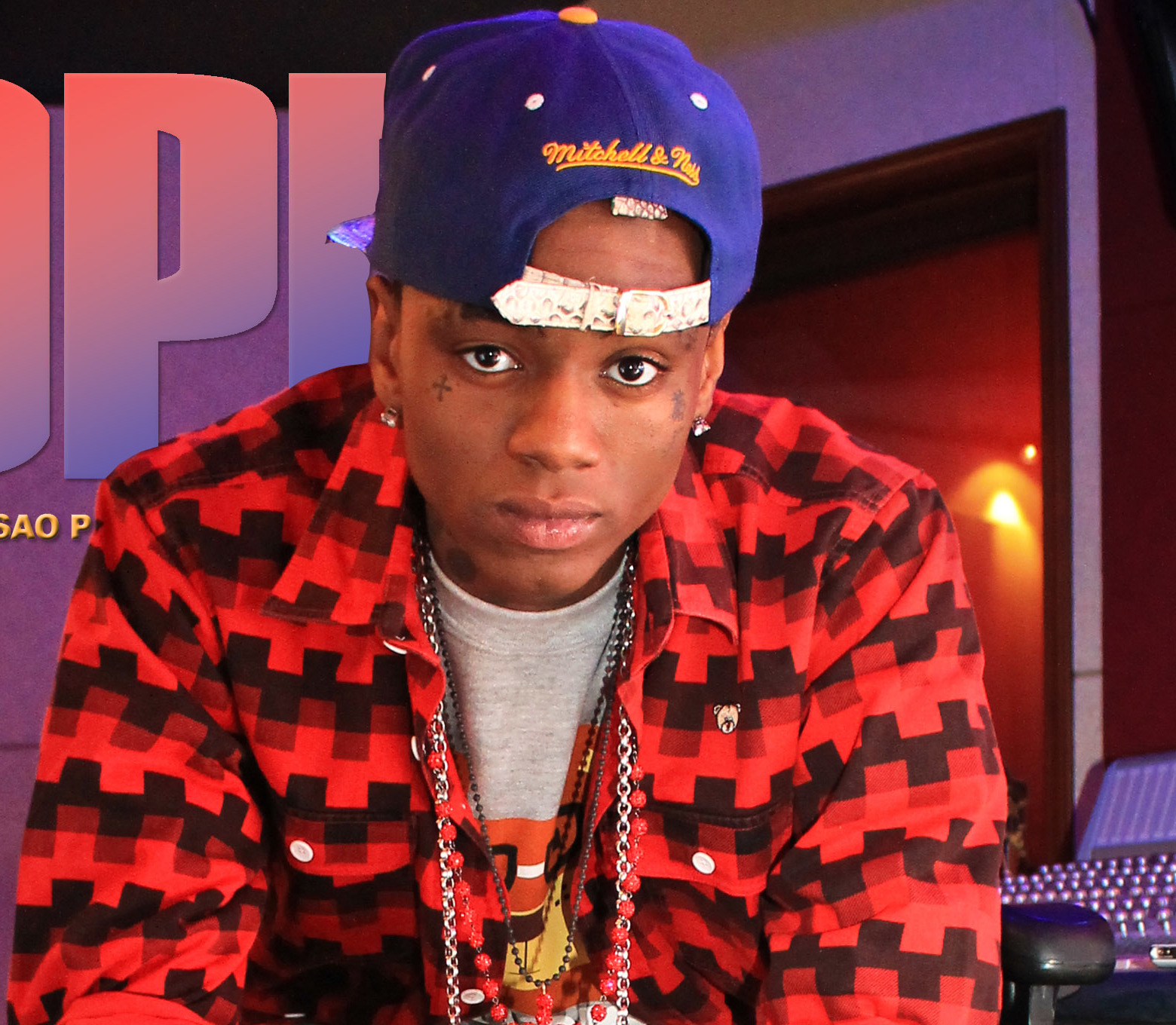
- Soulja Boy on Dope magazine cover in 2012

The discography of Soulja Boy, an American rapper and producer, consists of ten studio albums, three compilation albums, 71 mixtapes, 14 extended plays (EPs), 55 singles (including 19 as a featured artist), and 38 music videos.

After releasing his first mixtape, Unsigned & Still Major: Da Album Before da Album (late 2006), Soulja Boy released his major-label debut souljaboytellem.com in late 2007; it included the hit single "Crank That (Soulja Boy)". The same year, he was granted his own imprint label, Stacks on Deck Entertainment. In 2008, he released his second studio album, iSouljaBoyTellem; the album produced the top ten Billboard Hot 100 single "Kiss Me Thru the Phone". In 2010, he released his third studio album, The DeAndre Way; which included the singles "Pretty Boy Swag", "Blowing Me Kisses", and "Speakers Going Hammer".

== Albums ==
=== Studio albums ===
List of albums, with selected chart positions
Title	Album details	Peak chart positions						Sales	Certifications
Title	Album details	US	US R&B	US Rap	FRA	NZ	UK	Sales	Certifications
Souljaboytellem.com (as Soulja Boy Tell'Em)	Released: October 2, 2007; Label: SOD, Collipark, Interscope; Format: CD, MD, LP	4	4	1	132	9	134	US: 996,000	RMNZ: 2× Platinum
iSouljaBoyTellem	Released: December 16, 2008; Label: SOD, Collipark, Interscope; Format: CD, MD, LP	43	8	2	—	—	—		
The DeAndre Way	Released: November 30, 2010; Label: SOD, Collipark, Interscope; Format: CD, MD	90	18	8	—	—	—		
King Soulja 3	Released: July 29, 2014; Label: SOD, Rich Gang; Format: CD, digital download	—	—	—	—	—	—		
Loyalty	Released: February 3, 2015; Label: SOD; Format: Digital download	—	—	—	—	—	—		
Best to Ever Do It	Released: July 6, 2018; Label: SOD, Rich Gang; Format: Digital download	—	—	—	—	—	—		
Young Drako	Released: October 4, 2018; Label: SOD, Palm Tree; Format: Digital download	—	—	—	—	—	—		
Big Draco	Released: July 28, 2021; Label: SOD, Virgin Music; Format: CD, MD	—	—	—	—	—	—		
Big Draco 2	Released: November 19, 2021; Label: SOD, Virgin Music; Format: CD, MD	—	—	—	—	—	—		
Big Draco 3	Released: March 11, 2022; Label: SOD, Virgin Music; Format: CD, MD	—	—	—	—	—	—		
First To Do It	Released: October 21, 2022; Label: SODMG; Format: Digital File, Streaming	—	—	—	—	—	—		
Soulja Season	Released: May 12, 2023; Label: SODMG; Format: Digital File, Streaming	—	—	—	—	—	—		
Swag 6	Released: February 2, 2024; Label: SODMG; Format: Lossless Digital	—	—	—	—	—	—		
Swag Season	Released: July 28, 2024; Label: SODMG; Format: Lossless Digital	—	—	—	—	—	—		
Diary of a Soulja	Released: December 4, 2024; Label: SODMG; Format: Digital File, Streaming	—	—	—	—	—	—		
The Influence	Released: February 7, 2025; Label: SODMG; Format: Lossless Digital	—	—	—	—	—	—		
Draco Season	Released: August 22, 2025; Label: SODMG; Format: Digital File, Streaming	—	—	—	—	—	—		

=== Compilation albums ===
List of compilation albums
Title	Album details
Mr. Fly Boy	Released: July 14, 2009; Label: Formats: MD, LP
Successful	Released: April 24, 2014; Label: SODMG; Formats: MD, LP
Follow the Swag	Released: December 1, 2015; Label: Wild Ginger; Formats: MD, LP

=== Mixtapes ===
Soulja Boy's mixtapes and details
Title	Mixtape details
Unsigned and Still Major: Da Album Before Da Album (as Soulja Boy Tell'Em)	Released: February 19, 2007; Label: SOD
Supaman (as Soulja Boy Tell'Em)	Released: July 20, 2007; Label: SOD; Hosted by DJ Scream
Teen of the South	Released: June 22, 2008; Label: SOD; Hosted by DJ Scream
Live N Direct	Released: September 2, 2008; Label: SOD; Hosted by DJ Woogie
Tell Em TV	Released: January 13, 2009; Label: SOD; Hosted by DJ Woogie
Lord of the Ringtones	Released: March 3, 2009; Label: SOD; Hosted by DJ Woogie
Gangsta Grillz: Follow Me Edition	Released: June 11, 2009; Label: SOD; Hosted by DJ Drama
Work on Deck	Released: August 26, 2009; Label: SOD; Hosted by DJ Woogie & DJ Meesiah
My Way of Life	Released: September 12, 2009; Label: SOD; Hosted by DJ Woogie, DJ Ill Will & DJ Rockstar
Cortez	Released: October 31, 2009; Label: SOD; Hosted by DJ Whoo Kid & DJ Scream
Paranormal Activity	Released: October 31, 2009; Label: SOD; Hosted by DJ Woogie & DJ Neptune
Dat Piff	Released: October 31, 2009; Label: SOD; Hosted by DJ Holiday
Teenage Millionaire	Released: February 4, 2010; Label: SOD; Hosted by SODMG Ent.
Legendary	Released: February 27, 2010; Label: SOD; Hosted by DJ Woogie, DJ Ill Will & DJ Rockstar
Cookin' Soulja Boy	Released: June 11, 2010; Label: SOD; Hosted by Cookin Soul, DJ Woogie & DJ Whoo Kid
Best Rapper	Released: July 2, 2010; Label: SOD; Hosted by DJ Woogie & Evil Empire
Smooky	Released: January 22, 2011; Label: SOD; Hosted by SODMG Ent.
1UP	Released: March 17, 2011; Label: SOD; Hosted by SODMG Ent.
Juice	Released: April 20, 2011; Label: SOD; Hosted by DJ Scream & DJ Swamp Izzo; The cover of the mixtape is based on the movie Juice which starred Tupac Shakur
The Last Crown	Released: August 31, 2011; Label: SOD; Hosted by SODMG Ent.
Supreme	Released: September 19, 2011; Label: SOD; Hosted by SODMG Ent.
Skate Boy	Released: October 30, 2011; Label: SOD, Ocean Gang; Hosted by SODMG Ent., Ocean Gang, Rich Kingz, Alien Team
Gold on Deck	Released: December 30, 2011; Label: SOD; Hosted by SODMG Ent.
50/13	Released: January 9, 2012; Label: SOD; Hosted by SODMG Ent.
Mario & Domo vs. the World (with Young L)	Released: January 24, 2012; Label: SOD; Hosted by SODMG Ent.
OBEY	Released: March 23, 2012; Label: SOD; Hosted by SODMG Ent.
Double Cup City (with Vinny Cha$e)	Released: June 11, 2012; Label: SOD, Cheers Club; Hosted by SODMG Ent.
Juice II	Released: September 4, 2012; Label: SOD; Hosted by SODMG Ent.; Highest downloaded mixtape via Datpiff
Young & Flexin	Released: November 6, 2012; Label: SOD; Hosted by SODMG Ent.
LOUD	Released: December 25, 2012; Label: SOD; Hosted by SODMG Ent.; Retail mixtape
Foreign	Released: February 22, 2013; Label: SOD; Hosted by DJ Wats
Foreign 2	Released: April 24, 2013; Label: SOD; Hosted by SODMG Ent.
King Soulja	Released: May 14, 2013; Label: SOD; Hosted by SODMG Ent.; Retail Mixtape
Life After Fame	Released: July 30, 2013; Label: SOD; Hosted by SODMG Ent.
23	Released: September 24, 2013; Label: SOD; Hosted by SODMG Ent.
The King	Released: November 30, 2013; Label: SOD; Hosted by SODMG Ent.
King Soulja 2	Released: March 18, 2014; Label: SOD; Hosted by SODMG Ent., Rich Gang
Super Dope	Released: April 20, 2014; Label: SOD, Rich Gang; Format: Digital download
Young Millionaire	Released: October 31, 2014; Label: SOD, Rich Gang; Hosted by SODMG Ent.
Swag The Mixtape	Released: May 16, 2015; Label: SOD, Rich Gang; Hosted by SODMG Ent.
King Soulja 4	Released: July 30, 2015; Label: SOD, Rich Gang; Format: Digital download
Plug Talk	Released: September 28, 2015; Label: SOD, Rich Gang; Hosted by SODMG Ent.; Retail mixtape
S. Beezy	Released: November 24, 2015; Label: SOD, Rich Gang; Hosted by SODMG Ent.; Retail mixtape
Some Only Dream Of Making Gwap (with Calico Jonez)	Released: January 1, 2016; Label: SOD, Swish Gang; Hosted by SODMG Ent.
King Soulja 5	Released: February 14, 2016; Label: SOD, Rich Gang; Hosted by SODMG Ent.
Stacks on Deck	Released: March 15, 2016; Label: SOD, Rich Gang; Format: Digital download
Better Late Than Never	Released: June 9, 2016; Label: SOD, Rich Gang; Format: Digital download
Rockstar	Released: July 31, 2016; Label: SOD, Rich Gang; Hosted by SODMG Ent.
S. Beezy 2	Released: August 23, 2016; Label: SOD, Rich Gang; Hosted by SODMG Ent.
King Soulja 6	Released: September 29, 2016; Label: SOD, Rich Gang; Hosted by SODMG Ent.; Retail mixtape
Ignorant Shit (with Bow Wow)	Released: October 25, 2016; Label: SOD; Retail mixtape
Real Soulja 4 Life	Released: November 18, 2016; Label: SOD, Palm Tree; Retail mixtape
King Soulja 7	Released: December 30, 2016; Label: SOD, Rich Gang, Palm Tree; Hosted by SODMG Ent.; Retail mixtape
Big Soulja	Released: February 21, 2017; Label: SOD; Hosted by DJ Jerry & DJ Ransom Dollars
King Soulja 8	Released: January 18, 2018; Label: SOD; Hosted by SODMG Ent.; Retail mixtape
King	Released: October 11, 2018; Label: SOD; Hosted by SODMG Ent.
Swag 2	Released: December 27, 2018; Label: SOD; Hosted by SODMG Ent.
Fuego	Released: January 10, 2019; Label: SOD; Hosted by SODMG Ent.
King Soulja 9	Released: July 28, 2020; Label: SOD; Hosted by SODMG Ent.; Retail mixtape
Swag 3	Released: November 30, 2020; Label: SOD; Hosted by SODMG Ent.; Retail mixtape
Soulja World	Released: February 1, 2021; Label: SOD; Hosted by SODMG Ent.; Retail mixtape
No Looking Back	Released: August 10, 2021; Label: SOD; Hosted by SODMG Ent.; Retail mixtape
Swag 4	Released: September 3, 2021; Label: SOD; Hosted by SODMG Ent.; Retail mixtape
Soulja Stars	Released: March 23, 2022; Label: SOD; Hosted by SODMG Ent.; Retail mixtape
The Biggest Opp	Released: April 3, 2022; Label: SOD; Hosted by SODMG Ent.; Retail mixtape
Soulja World 2	Released: July 28, 2022; Label: SOD; Hosted by SODMG Ent.; Retail mixtape
First to Do It	Released: October 21, 2022; Label: SOD; Hosted by SODMG Ent.; Retail mixtape
Swag 5	Released: March 31, 2023; Label: SOD; Hosted by SODMG Ent.; Retail mixtape
Soulja World 3	Released: July 28, 2023; Label: SOD; Hosted by SODMG Ent.; Retail mixtape
Pretty Boy Millionaires 2 (with Lil B)	Scheduled: TBA; Label: SOD, BasedWorld; Hosted by DJ Woogie

== Extended plays ==
List of extended plays
Title	Extended play details
Death Note	Released: May 5, 2010; Label: SOD; Hosted by SODMG Ent.
Pretty Boy Millionaires (with Lil B)	Released: July 5, 2010; Label: SOD, BasedWorld; Hosted by DJ Woogie
Soulja Society	Released: November 13, 2010; Label: SOD; Hosted by Soulja Society
Bernaurd Arnault	Released: July 15, 2011; Label: SOD; Hosted by SODMG Ent.
21	Released: August 1, 2011; Label: SOD; Hosted by SODMG Ent.
Keep Living Keep Playing	Released: November 30, 2012; Label: SOD; Hosted by SODMG Ent.
All Black	Released: March 25, 2013; Label: SOD; Format: MD
Cuban Link	Released: May 27, 2013; Label: SOD; Hosted by SODMG Ent.
M & M: Money & Music	Released: July 23, 2015; Label: SOD, Rich Gang; Hosted by SODMG Ent.
25 The Movie	Released: July 30, 2015; Label: SOD, Rich Gang; Retail Mixtape
Finesse	Released: February 10, 2016; Label: SOD, Rich Gang; Hosted by SODMG Ent.
SouljaYayo (with Go Yayo)	Released: February 14, 2018; Label: SOD; Format: MD
No Sleep	Released: July 29, 2018; Label: SOD; Format: MD
Tell Ya	Released: March 24, 2019; Label: SOD; Format: MD

== Singles ==
=== As lead artist ===
List of singles as lead artist, with selected chart positions and certifications, showing year released and album name
Title	Year	Peak chart positions										Certifications	Album
Title	Year	US	US R&B/HH	US Rap	AUS	CAN	GER	IRE	NZ	SWI	UK	Certifications	Album
"Crank That (Soulja Boy)"	2007	1	3	1	3	5	29	3	2	64	2	RIAA: 3× Platinum; ARIA: Platinum; BPI: Platinum; BVMI: Platinum; RMNZ: 3× Platinum	Souljaboytellem.com
"Soulja Girl" (featuring i15)	2007	32	13	6	—	75	—	—	10	—	—		Souljaboytellem.com
"Yahhh!" (featuring Arab)	2007	48	34	14	35	72	—	18	3	—	49		Souljaboytellem.com
"Donk"	2008	— (Note: "Donk" did not enter the Billboard Hot 100, but peaked at number 21 on the Bubbling Under Hot 100 chart.)	37	22	30	—	—	—	—	—	—		Souljaboytellem.com
"Bird Walk"	2008	— (Note: "Bird Walk" did not enter the Billboard Hot 100, but peaked at number two on the Bubbling Under Hot 100 chart.)	40	17	—	—	—	—	—	—	—		iSouljaBoyTellem
"Kiss Me Thru the Phone" (featuring Sammie)	2008	3	4	1	16	10	—	11	2	88	6	ARIA: Gold; BPI: 2× Platinum; RMNZ: 5× Platinum	iSouljaBoyTellem
"Turn My Swag On"	2008	19	3	3	—	—	56	89	—	—	48		iSouljaBoyTellem
"Pow"	2009	—	—	—	—	—	—	—	—	—	—		Lord of the Ringtones and Follow Me
"2Milli"	2010	—	—	—	—	—	—	—	—	—	—		Teenage Millionaire and Legendary
"Pretty Boy Swag"	2010	34	6	5	—	—	—	—	—	—	—		The DeAndre Way
"Blowing Me Kisses"	2010	— (Note: "Blowing Me Kisses" did not enter the Billboard Hot 100, but peaked at number five on the Bubbling Under Hot 100 chart.)	58	—	—	—	—	—	—	—	—		The DeAndre Way
"Speakers Going Hammer"	2010	— (Note: "Speakers Going Hammer" did not enter the Billboard Hot 100, but peaked at number six on the Bubbling Under Hot 100 chart.)	47	24	—	—	—	—	—	—	—		The DeAndre Way
"Zan With That Lean"	2011	—	—	—	—	—	—	—	—	—	—		Juice
"Handsome"	2013	—	—	—	—	—	—	—	—	—	—		All Black
"Ridin Round"	2013	—	—	—	—	—	—	—	—	—	—		Non-album singles
"We Ready" (featuring Migos)	2013	—	—	—	—	—	—	—	—	—	—		Non-album singles
"Triple Beam"	2014	—	—	—	—	—	—	—	—	—	—		Super Dope
"Giuseppe's"	2014	—	—	—	—	—	—	—	—	—	—		King Soulja 2
"Come Try It"	2014	—	—	—	—	—	—	—	—	—	—		King Soulja 3
"Hustlin'"	2014	—	—	—	—	—	—	—	—	—	—		King Soulja 3
"Red Bottoms & Balenciaga"	2014	—	—	—	—	—	—	—	—	—	—		Young Millionaire
"Hurricane"	2015	—	—	—	—	—	—	—	—	—	—		Loyalty
"Whippin My Wrist (Too Rich)"	2015	—	—	—	—	—	—	—	—	—	—		King Soulja 4
"Cake"	2015	—	—	—	—	—	—	—	—	—	—		Swag the Mixtape
"Diddy Bop"	2015	—	—	—	—	—	—	—	—	—	—		Non-album single
"Gratata"	2015	—	—	—	—	—	—	—	—	—	—		Plug Talk
"Make It Rain"	2015	—	—	—	—	—	—	—	—	—	—		S.Beezy
"I'm Too Clean"	2015	—	—	—	—	—	—	—	—	—	—		Non-album single
"Drop the Top"	2016	—	—	—	—	—	—	—	—	—	—		Blessed
"Stephen Curry"	2016	—	—	—	—	—	—	—	—	—	—		Non-album single
"Day One"	2016	—	—	—	—	—	—	—	—	—	—		Better Late Than Never
"Rockstar"	2016	—	—	—	—	—	—	—	—	—	—		Rockstar, S. Beezy 2 and Blessed
"Max Payne"	2016	—	—	—	—	—	—	—	—	—	—		S. Beezy 2
"Hit Them Folks"	2016	—	—	—	—	—	—	—	—	—	—		King Soulja 6
"I'm Up Now" (featuring Chief Keef)	2016	—	—	—	—	—	—	—	—	—	—		King Soulja 6
"New Drip"	2019	—	—	—	—	—	—	—	—	—	—		Fuego
"Cut Dat Check"	2019	—	—	—	—	—	—	—	—	—	—		Non-album single
"She Make It Clap"	2021	—	— (Note: "She Make It Clap" did not enter the Hot R&B/Hip-Hop Songs chart, but peaked at number 23 on the Mainstream R&B/Hip-Hop Airplay chart.)	—	—	—	—	—	—	—	—		TBA
"Rick & Morty" (featuring Rich the Kid)	2021	—	—	—	—	—	—	—	—	—	—		Non-album singles
"Mona Lisa" (with Lil Pump)	2022	—	—	—	—	—	—	—	—	—	—		Non-album singles
"BTBT" (with B.I featuring DeVita)	2022	—	—	—	—	—	—	—	—	—	—		Love or Loved Part.1
"—" denotes a title that did not chart, or was not released in that territory.

=== As featured artist ===
Year	Song	Certifications	Album
2009	"Delirious" (Vistoso Bosses featuring Soulja Boy Tell 'Em)	RMNZ: Platinum	The World Would Suck Without Girls

== Other charted songs ==
List of other charted songs, with selected chart positions, showing year released and album name
Title	Year	Peak chart positions		Album
Title	Year	US Bub.	US R&B/HH Bub.	Album
"Soulja Boy Tell 'Em"	2008	8	—	iSouljaBoyTellem
"I'm About tha Stax"	2009	24	—	iSouljaBoyTellem
"Trigger Finger" (Lil Wayne featuring Soulja Boy)	2013	—	4	I Am Not a Human Being II

== Music videos ==
=== Studio album music videos ===
Year	Song	Album	Director
2007	"Bapes"	souljaboytellem.com	30/30 Boyz (DeAndre Way & Arab)
2007	"Crank That (Soulja Boy)"	souljaboytellem.com	Dale RAGE Resteghini
2007	"Soulja Girl"	souljaboytellem.com	Dale RAGE Resteghini
2007	"Yahhh!"	souljaboytellem.com	Dale RAGE Resteghini
2007	"Let Me Get 'Em"	souljaboytellem.com	DeAndre Way
2008	"Donk"	souljaboytellem.com	Dale RAGE Resteghini
2008	"Bird Walk"	iSouljaBoyTellem	DeAndre Way, Mr. Collipark
2008	"Soulja Boy Tell 'Em"	iSouljaBoyTellem	Eric Towner, John Harvatine IV, Zack Schiller, Suli Mccullough
2008	"Turn My Swag On"	iSouljaBoyTellem	DeAndre Way, Matt Alonzo, DJ Skee
2008	"Kiss Me Thru the Phone"	iSouljaBoyTellem	Dale RAGE Resteghini
2009	"Whoop Rico"	iSouljaBoyTellem	Dale RAGE Resteghini
2009	"Gucci Bandanna"	iSouljaBoyTellem	DeAndre Way, Mr. Collipark
2009	"Rubber Bandz"	iSouljaBoyTellem	DeAndre Way
2010	"Pretty Boy Swag"	The DeAndre Way	Dale RAGE Resteghini, Mickey Finnegan
2010	"Blowing Me Kisses"	The DeAndre Way	DeAndre Way, Gil Green, Simon Thirlway
2010	"Mean Mug"	The DeAndre Way	Colin Tilley
2010	"Speakers Going Hammer"	The DeAndre Way	Colin Tilley
2010	"30 Thousand 100 Million"	The DeAndre Way	Colin Tilley, Andrew Listermann
2013	"New New"	All Black	Marko Dragan Zecevic
2014	"Triple Beam"	Super Dope	DeAndre Way
2014	"Fire"	Super Dope	HiDefinition
2014	"Time Is Money"	Super Dope	HiDefinition
2014	"Come Try It"	King Soulja III	HiDefinition
2014	"Tony Hawk (Whip My Wrist)"	King Soulja III	HiDefinition
2014	"Hustlin'"	King Soulja III	HiDefinition
2014	"Gas in My Tank"	King Soulja III	HiDefinition
2014	"In My System"	King Soulja III	Brian Petch
2014	"Soulja Soulja"	King Soulja III	4 Dub Ent.
2015	"Hurricane"	Loyalty	HiDefinition
2015	"Don't Nothing Move But the Money"	Loyalty	Possible Philly
2015	"We Don't Fight"	Loyalty	Tra-V MC Films
2015	"Hit It"	Loyalty	HiDefinition
2015	"Backwoods"	Loyalty	Javi Benito Peris
2015	"Designer"	Loyalty	John Anthony Villalobos, Arystine Michelle Miller, Justin Jones
2015	"Whippin' My Wrist (Too Rich)"	King Soulja 4	John Anthony Villalobos
2015	"It Will Never Stop"	King Soulja 4	Parallax Pictures
2015	"Rick Ross"	King Soulja 4	HiDefinition
2015	"Take Something"	King Soulja 4	HiDefinition
2015	"Getting Figures"	King Soulja 4	C-Nyce
2015	"Actavis"	King Soulja 4	Justin Petrone
2016	"Dope Runner"	Stacks On Deck	A Mannie B Production
2016	"Stacks On Deck"	Stacks On Deck	A Mannie B Production
2019	"Intro"	How Could You Blame Me?	JUDDYREMIXDEM
2019	"Trappin Out Da Mansion"	How Could You Blame Me?	Colorful Mula

=== Mixtapes music videos ===
Year	Song	Album	Director
2009	"Successful" (Freestyle)	My Way of Life	SODMG films
2009	"Outerspace Flow"	My Way of Life	DeAndre Way
2009	"I Done Came Up"	My Way of Life	Jordan Towers
2009	"Gucci Louie"	My Way of Life	Jordan Towers
2009	"Gangsta Muzik"	My Way of Life	Jordan Towers
2009	"Getting Money"	My Way of Life	Jordan Towers
2010	"The Best"	Legendary	SODMG films
2010	"Pretty Boy Swag"	Legendary	G5 Kids, DeAndre Way
2010	"All Black Everything"	Legendary	Dale RAGE Resteghini
2010	"2 Milli"	Legendary	Dale RAGE Resteghini
2010	"Take Over"	Death Note	DeAndre Way
2010	"Mean Mug"	Death Note	DeAndre Way
2010	"Touchdown"	Best Rapper	DeAndre Way
2010	"Digital"	Best Rapper	Alex Nazari, DeAndre Way
2010	"I'm Boomin'"	Best Rapper	Figvrati Films
2011	"Swag Get at You"	Smooky	DeAndre Way
2011	"Smooky"	Smooky	DeAndre Way
2011	"W.E.T."	Smooky	DeAndre Way
2011	"Weed & Shoes"	1UP	DeAndre Way
2011	"AK-47"	1UP	DeAndre Way
2011	"SNRS (Skinny Niggaz Running S***)"	1UP	DeAndre Way
2011	"Juice"	Juice	Dale RAGE Resteghini
2011	"Zan Wit That Lean"	Juice	Dale RAGE Resteghini
2011	"Money in a Trash Bag"	Juice	Dale RAGE Resteghini
2011	"Money Gang Anthem"	Juice	DeAndre Way
2011	"Texas"	Bernard Arnault	DeAndre Way
2011	"Fire Blunts"	Bernard Arnault	DeAndre Way
2011	"My City"	21	Jack Jeffrey
2011	"Swag Daddy"	21	DeAndre Way
2011	"The Last Crown Intro"	The Last Crown	Freedom Hights Production
2011	"Soulja Hova"	The Last Crown	DeAndre Way
2011	"Kingpin Beezy"	Supreme	DeAndre Way
2011	"Rollin"	Supreme	DeAndre Way
2011	"Tear It Up"	Skate Boy (Deluxe Edition)	DeAndre Way
2011	"Came Out the Water"	Skate Boy (Deluxe Edition)	DeAndre Way
2011	"Swisher Sweet Swag"	Skate Boy (Deluxe Edition)	DeAndre Way
2011	"P.A.P.E.R."	Gold on Deck	DeAndre Way
2011	"Swagg Daddy"	Gold on Deck	DeAndre Way
2012	"Moving"	50/13	DeAndre Way
2012	"50/13"	50/13	Max Albert
2012	"Versace Bentley"	50/13	Grizz Lee
2012	"Triple Chain Gang"	Mario & Domo Vs The World	Grizz Lee
2012	"Savage"	OBEY	DeAndre Way
2012	"LV & Champagne"	Double Cup City	DeAndre Way
2012	"Ugly"	Juice II	DeAndre Way
2012	"For My Money"	Juice II	DeAndre Way
2012	"Fast Car, Fast Money"	Juice II	SODMG Films
2012	"Foreign Cars"	Young & Flexin	HiDefinition
2012	"There Go Soulja"	Young & Flexin	HiDefinition
2012	"Soulja Banger"	Young & Flexin	DeAndre Way
2012	"My Niggaz"	LOUD	DeAndre Way
2013	"Molly"	LOUD	SODMG Films
2013	"Break the Bank"	LOUD	HiDefinition
2013	"Turn Up"	LOUD	HiDefinition
2013	"All Black"	Foreign	DeAndre Way
2013	"Water Whippin'"	King Soulja	DeAndre Way
2013	"K.I.N.G."	King Soulja	DeAndre Way
2013	"Slangin' Chickens"	King Soulja	DeAndre Way
2013	"Cuban Link"	Cuban Link	Marko Dragan Zecevic
2013	"All Foreign"	Life After Fame	DGainz
2013	"The Man"	Life After Fame	DeAndre Way
2013	"Call Of Duty"	Life After Fame	DeAndre Way
2013	"Alotta Bandz"	Life After Fame	DeAndre Way
2013	"The King"	23	DeAndre Way
2013	"Rollie'"	23	DeAndre Way
2013	"At the Top"	The King	DeAndre Way
2014	"Dirty Diana"	The King	DeAndre Way
2014	"SRT"	King Soulja II	DeAndre Way
2014	"Make It Work" (Remix)	King Soulja II	Kee Motion
2014	"Movie"	Young Millionaire	DeAndre Way
2014	"Red Bottoms & Balenciaga"	Young Millionaire	Tra-V MC Films
2014	"On the News"	Young Millionaire	HiDefinition
2014	"Trap Boy Soulja"	Young Millionaire	HiDefinition
2015	"Spend It All"	25 The Movie	Lucky Finn Productions, Max Albert
2015	"Gratata"	Plug Talk EP	A Zae Production
2015	"Free Base"	SWAG	Pilot Industries
2015	"Jumpman (Freestyle)"	S. Beezy	C-Nyce
2015	"Make It Rain"	S. Beezy	SODMG Films, Will Hoopes
2015	"Diamonds & Gold"	S. Beezy	SODMG Films, Will Hoopes
2015	"Pull Up and Hop Out the Vert"	S. Beezy	SODMG Films, Will Hoopes
2015	"Flex Up Run the Check Up"	S. Beezy	SODMG Films, Will Hoopes
2016	"Broke the Rim"	S. Beezy	SODMG Films, Will Hoopes
2016	"Workin It"	King Soulja 5	Laka Films
2016	"Whippin the Pot"	King Soulja 5	Laka Films

=== Miscellaneous music videos ===
Year	Song	Director
2010	"Third Eye Open"	SODMG Films
2010	"Lil Dre"	SODMG Films
2010	"Kickin'"	Jordan Towers
2011	"So Far Gone"	SODMG Films
2011	"My Playa"	SODMG Films
2011	"OMG"	SODMG Films
2011	"Teach Me How to Cook: OMG Part 2"	SODMG Films
2011	"Conceited"	SODMG Films
2011	"Lets Be Real"	SODMG Films
2011	"Cheat Code Swag"	SODMG Films
2011	"Bammer, Bammer, Bammer"	SODMG Films
2012	"Im Leanin'"	SODMG Films
2012	"NuReligion"	Grizz Lee
2012	"DMT"	SODMG Films
2012	"PBG"	SODMG Films
2012	"Reppin 4 the Ocean"	SODMG Films
2012	"Fast Car"	SODMG Films
2012	"I Be So Fresh"	SODMG Films
2012	"She Trippin"	Kenneth Cabanilla
2013	"Trappin"	SODMG Films
2013	"Flavors"	SODMG Films
2013	"Killin It"	SODMG Films
2013	"Money Counter"	SODMG Films
2013	"Sauce"	SODMG Films
2013	"Im On Now"	CM Delux Films
2013	"Turnin Up"	CM Delux Films
2013	"Finesse"	SODMG Films
2014	"I'm Swaggin'"	Daniel Andrade
2014	"A Million"	SODMG Films
2014	"Make It Work"	SODMG Films
2014	"Migo"	SODMG Films
2014	"That's My Gang"	SODMG Films
2014	"Backseat"	SODMG Films
2014	"23 Mill"	Daniel Andrade
2014	"No Talking"	SODMG Films
2014	"Super Dope"	SODMG Films
2014	"Hungry"	SODMG Films
2014	"Swagg Like Me"	SODMG Films
2014	"Shooters"	HiDefinition
2014	"Ice in My Cup"	HiDefinition
2014	"Red Dot"	LJ Frazier Productions
2015	"Money Gang"	HiDefinition
2015	"Aquafina"	A Zae Production
2015	"Covered in Gold"	SODMG Films, Rob Seher
2016	"Stephen Curry"	SODMG Films, Will Hoopes
2021	"She Make It Clap"	Dale Restighini
2021	"She Make It Clap (Remix ft. French Montana)	Dale Restighini
2021	"Rick & Morty" (ft. Rich the Kid)	SODMG Films, Dale Restighini, Qaterryus Williams

== Guest appearances ==
List of non-single guest appearances, with other performing artists, showing year released and album name
Title	Year	Other artist(s)	Album
"Get It Poppin'"	2008	Tyra B	none
"Get Silly" (Mr. Collipark Remix)	2008	V.I.C., Bun B, E-40, Polow da Don, Unk, Jermaine Dupri,	Beast
"Girlfriend" (Remix)	2008	Bow Wow, Omarion, Swizz Beatz, Cassidy	Face Off
"My Dougie" (Remix)	2008	Lil' Wil	none
"They Lookin' at My Neck"	2008	Trackstar	none
"Turn It Up (Gotta Chose)"	2008	Chingy	none
"Get Money"	2008	Bow Wow	none
"Get Em, Got Em"	2008	Gucci Mane	none
"Show Out" (Remix)	2008	Unk, Sean Kingston, Jim Jones, E-40	none
"G-Walk"	2009	Lil Jon	Crunk Rock
"It's Going Down"	2009	Gully Mang	none
"Download" (Remix)	2009	Lil' Kim, T-Pain, Charlie Wilson, The-Dream	none
"Ice Cream Paint Job" (Remix)	2009	Dorrough, Jermaine Dupri, Jim Jones, Slim Thug, E-40, Rich Boy	none
"My Money"	2009	Killer Mike, JBar	none
"Money Hungry"	2009	D. Prince, Arab, Kasland, Lit Mike	none
"Rockin' All My Chains On"	2010	DJ Khaled, Schife, Bun B, Birdman	Victory
"In My Bag"	2010	College Boyys	Spring Break
"Swag Sex"	2010	Marques Houston	Mattress Music
"King of the Pyrex" (Remix)	2010	Tony Yayo	none
"Bad"	2010	Chris Brown	In My Zone (Rhythm & Streets)
"Fuck U Mean"	2010	8Ball & MJG	Ten Toes Down
"All I Know"	2010	Waka Flocka Flame, Lil B	none
"Shut the Stage Down"	2010	Sean Kingston	none
"Greedy"	2010	Alycia, YG	none
"Maybe" (Remix)	2010	Rocko, Rick Ross, Gucci Mane	none
"Strip Club"	2010	Sean Garrett	The Inkwell
"That's Her" (Remix)	2010	Lil Scrappy, Travis Porter	none
"I'm Fresh"	2010	Young Keyz, Nova	none
"Do It Again"	2010	Dan Talevski, will.i.am	none
"It's Goin Up"	2010	Audio Push	none
"Yep Dat's Me"	2010	Jamie Foxx, Ludacris	Best Night of My Life
"BBM"	2010	Sean Kingston, Teairra Mari	none
"Burr Burr"	2011	Gucci Mane, Yo Gotti	The Return of Mr. Zone 6
"Touchdown"	2011	The Ranger$, Kid Ink	none
"Hood Dreams"	2011	Sean Kingston	King of Kingz
"Throwed Off" (Remix)	2011	Treal Lee, Prince Rick, Waka Flocka Flame, Slim Dunkin, Ace Hood, Translee	none
"Karate" (Remix)	2011	Dose, Juelz Santana	none
"Hustle Real Hard"	2011	Dok2	Hustle Real Hard
"My Boy" (Remix)	2011	Kourtney Heart, Magnolia Shorty	none
"Mayday"	2012	Tinie Tempah, Chipmunk	none
"Gettin Paid"	2012	Vinny Cha$e	Survival of the Swag
"3 hunna" (Remix)	2012	Chief Keef	Back from the Dead
"Another One"	2012	JBar	TOKE Vol 2
"She Say She Luv Me"	2012	Chief Keef	Back from the Dead
"Straight Outta Southside	2012	Lil Slykk	Terminate the World
"Cash"	2012	Chevy Woods, Juicy J	Gang Land
"Hop Out"	2012	Chevy Woods, Juicy J	Gang Land
"On Dat Ho"	2012	Jazz Lazer	none
"I.L.Y. (I Love You)"	2012	BR	none
"Body Ody"	2012	TreVante, Cash Out	none
"Turn Up"	2012	Fredo Santana, Tadoe	Fredo Kruger
"I Lean (Lose It)"	2013	Mindless Behavior	All Around the World
"Trigger Finger"	2013	Lil Wayne	I Am Not a Human Being II
"Turn It Up"	2014	Wanessa	DNA Tour – Ao Vivo
"Yasss Bish"	2014	Nicki Minaj	none
"Gold Like This"	2014	Gold Top	none
"Double Dip"	2016	Far East Movement, Loco	Identity
"Gated"	2018	Chief Keef	Back from the Dead 3
"My Valentine"	2019	24hrs	Valentino Twenty
"First Time in a Long Time"	2022	Kanye West	Donda 2
"BTBT"	2022	B.I, DeVita	Love or Loved

== Production discography ==
List of production and songwriting credits (excluding guest appearances, interpolations, and samples)
Track(s)	Year	Credit	Artist	Album
1. "Intro"	2007	Producer	Soulja Boy	Souljaboytellem.com
2. "Crank That (Soulja Boy)"	2007	Producer	Soulja Boy	Souljaboytellem.com
4. "Snap and Roll"	2007	Producer	Soulja Boy	Souljaboytellem.com
5. "Bapes"; (featuring Arab)	2007	Producer	Soulja Boy	Souljaboytellem.com
6. "Let Me Get Em"	2007	Producer	Soulja Boy	Souljaboytellem.com
7. "Donk"	2007	Producer	Soulja Boy	Souljaboytellem.com
8. "Yahhh!"; (featuring Arab): Sample credit: The Honey Drippers – "Impeach the President"	2007	Producer	Soulja Boy	Souljaboytellem.com
11. "Booty Meat"	2007	Producer	Soulja Boy	Souljaboytellem.com
12. "Report Card"; (featuring Arab): Sample credit: Jim Jones – "We Fly High" and Rich Boy – "Throw Some D's"	2007	Producer	Soulja Boy	Souljaboytellem.com
13. "Don't Get Mad"	2007	Producer	Soulja Boy	Souljaboytellem.com
15. "Nope"	2007	Producer	Soulja Boy	Souljaboytellem.com
6. "Get Silly"	2007	Producer (with Mr. Collipark and The Package Store)	V.I.C.	Beast
19. "Get Silly (Mr. Collipark Remix)"; (featuring Soulja Boy, Bun B, E-40, Unk, Polow da Don and Jermaine Dupri)	2007	Producer (with Mr. Collipark and The Package Store)	V.I.C.	Beast
12. "Marco Polo"; (featuring Soulja Boy)	2009	Producer	Bow Wow	New Jack City II
2. "Bird Walk"	2009	Producer	Soulja Boy	iSouljaBoyTellem
4. "Gucci Bandanna"; (featuring Gucci Mane and Shawty Lo)	2009	Producer	Soulja Boy	iSouljaBoyTellem
7. "Booty Got Swag (Donk Part 2)"	2009	Producer	Soulja Boy	iSouljaBoyTellem
8. "Hey You There"	2009	Producer	Soulja Boy	iSouljaBoyTellem
11. "Wit My Yums On"	2009	Producer	Soulja Boy	iSouljaBoyTellem
12. "Go Head"; (featuring Juney Boomdata)	2009	Producer	Soulja Boy	iSouljaBoyTellem
6. "30 Thousand 100 Million"; (featuring Lil B and Arab)	2010	Producer	Soulja Boy	The DeAndre Way
14. "Wowzers"; (featuring Trina)	2013	Producer	Lil Wayne	I Am Not a Human Being II
19. "We Ready Remix"; (featuring Soulja Boy)	2013	Producer	Migos	Y.R.N. (Young Rich Niggas)
"Yasss Bish" (featuring Soulja Boy)	2014	Producer	Nicki Minaj	Non-album single
4. "Pendulum"	2020	Songwriter, additional vocals (Note: "Pendulum" samples an Instagram Live audio clip of Soulja Boy; recorded c. 2019)	Royce da 5'9"	The Allegory
