= Dale Resteghini =

American film director (born 1968)

Rage
- Born: Dale Anthony Resteghini; August 28, 1968 (age 58); Boston, Massachusetts, U.S.
- Occupations: Music video director; film director
- Years active: 1987–present

Dale Anthony Resteghini (born August 28, 1968), known professionally as Rage, is an American music video director and film director. He has been credited on music videos for prominent music industry acts in the genres of hardcore, heavy metal, rock, punk, hip hop and gangsta rap.

Namely, Resteghini has directed music videos for the singles "Grand Theft Autumn/Where Is Your Boy" by Fall Out Boy, "Crank That (Soulja Boy)" by Soulja Boy, "We Fly High" by Jim Jones, "This Is Why I'm Hot" by Mims, "Love Come Down" by Diddy – Dirty Money, "Game's Pain" by the Game, and "Dirty Situation" by Mohombi, among others.

== Film career ==
He directed the film Colorz of Rage in 1999, wherein he also co-starred. The independent urban drama features Debbie (Nicki Richards) and Tony Mespelli (himself) trying to make it in New York City. It also features rappers Redman and R&B singer Cheryl "Pepsii" Riley.

== Other films ==
He continued with a number of micro budgeted films including the top selling Da Hip Hop Witch, a 2000 unscripted spoof film of The Blair Witch Project featuring Eminem, Ja Rule, Pras, Vanilla Ice, Rah Digga and Mobb Deep. In 2002 he directed Urban Massacre where well-established and rising hip hop artists make for an all-star cast in a horror/comedy featuring Ill One, Krumbsnatcha, Dia, Ivory, Remedy, Baby Sham, Guru (Gang Starr).

== Selective music videography ==
He started filming videos in 2003. He has worked with a big number of artists including:

- Ace Hood featuring Trey Songz, Rick Ross and Juelz Santana - "Ride or Die (Remix)"
- Adelitas Way - "Invincible"
- Agnostic Front featuring Jamey Jasta - "Peace"
- Alexandra Burke featuring Pitbull - "All Night Long"
- Alter Bridge - "Rise Today"
- All That Remains - "This Calling"
- All That Remains - "This Darkened Heart"
- Anthrax - "Deathrider"
- Birdman featuring Lil Wayne - "I Run This"
- Brutha - "Can't Get Enough"
- Brutha - "One Day on This Earth"
- Brutha - "She's Gone"
- Butcher Babies - "Best Friend"
- Busta Rhymes - "Arab Money"
- Busta Rhymes - "Don't Touch Me (Throw da Water on 'Em)"
- C-Note - "Forgive Me" (also in Spanish "Lo Siento")
- Cam'ron - "Get'em Daddy (Remix)"
- Cam'ron - "Touch It or Not"
- Children of Bodom - "Was It Worth It?"
- Clipse - "Fast Life"
- Corey Taylor - "Beyond"
- Craig David - "One More Lie (Standing in the Shadows)"
- Crowbar - "The Cemetery Angels"
- Day26 featuring Diddy and Yung Joc - "Imma Put It on Her"
- Diddy - "Dirty Money"
- The Dillinger Escape Plan - "Setting Fire to Sleeping Giants"
- DJ Drama with Akon, Snoop Dogg and T.I. - "Day Dreaming"
- DJ Drama featuring Nelly, T.I., Diddy, Yung Joc, Willie the Kid, Young Jeezy and Twista - "5000 Ones"
- DJ Felli Fel featuring Lil Jon, Ludacris, Diddy and Akon - "Get Buck in Here"
- Dope - "Addiction"
- Dope - "6-6-Sick"
- Dry Kill Logic - "Paper Tiger"
- E-Town Concrete - "Punch the Walls"
- Escape the Fate - "Just a Memory"
- Escape the Fate - "Alive"
- Fall Out Boy - "Grand Theft Autumn/Where Is Your Boy"
- Five Finger Death Punch - "Blue on Black"
- Five Finger Death Punch - "Time Like These"
- Five Finger Death Punch - "Welcome to the Circus"
- Five Finger Death Punch - "Legacy"
- Flo Rida - "Turn Around (5, 4, 3, 2, 1)"
- The Game featuring Keyshia Cole - "Game's Pain"
- Guns N' Roses - "Better" (Unreleased)
- Hatebreed - "In Ashes They Shall Reap"
- Hatebreed - "Defeatist"
- Hatebreed - "Perseverance"
- Hatebreed - "This Is Now"
- Hatebreed - "Live for This"
- Hatebreed - "To the Threshold"
- Hawthorne Heights - "Pens and Needles"
- Hed PE - "Represent"
- Hed PE - "Get Ready"
- Hurricane Chris - "The Hand Clap"
- Ice Cube - "Do Ya Thang"
- Ill Niño - "What You Deserve"
- Ja Rule featuring Lil Wayne - "Uh-Ohhh!"
- Ja-bar - "Daze"
- Jedward featuring Vanilla Ice - "Under Pressure (Ice Ice Baby)"
- Jim Jones - "We Fly High / Reppin' Time"
- Jim Jones featuring Diddy, T.I., Juelz Santana, Young Dro and Birdman - "We Fly High (Remix)"
- Jim Jones - "Emotionless"
- Jim Jones - "Love Me No More"
- Kottonmouth Kings - "Peace of Mind"
- Kottonmouth Kings - "Everybody Move"
- Kottonmouth Kings featuring Cypress Hill - "Put It Down"
- Lemar - "The Way Love Goes"
- Love Is Red - “Close My Eyes”
- Lumidee - "Crazy"
- Madball - "Heavenhell"
- Mayday Parade - "The Silence"
- Method Man & Redman - "Miss International"
- Mims - "This Is Why I'm Hot"
- Mims - "Like This"
- Misery Signals - "The Year Summer Ended in June"
- Mohombi featuring Akon - "Dirty Situation"
- Most Precious Blood - "The Great Red Shift"
- Mudvayne - "Determined"
- N-Dubz - "I Need You" "Girls," "Playing with Fire"
- Nonpoint - "Miracle"
- NORA - "I Should Have Sent Flowers"
- Juelz Santana - "Clockwork"
- Juelz Santana featuring Lil Wayne and Young Jeezy - "Make It Work for You"
- PLUSH - "Better Off Alone"
- O.T. Genasis - "CoCo"
- Project Pat featuring Three 6 Mafia - "Don't Call Me No Mo"
- Ralph Tresvant featuring Johnny Gill - "All Mine"
- Redman - "Put It Down"
- Riff Raff featuring G-Eazy and J-Doe - "Mercedez"
- Ron Browz and Jim Jones featuring Juelz Santana - "Pop Champagne"
- RZA - "U Can't Stop Me Now"
- Sahyba - "Marco Polo"
- Shadows Fall - "The Power of I and I"
- Saigon featuring Lecrae and DJ Corbett - "Best Thing That I Found"
- Sizzla - "Ultimate Hustler / Just One of Those Days," "Cost of Living"
- Sevendust - "Falcons on Top"
- Soulidium - "Drama"
- Soulja Boy - "Crank That (Soulja Boy)" "Kiss Me thru the Phone," "Yahhh!," "Pretty Boy Swag," 2 Milli," "Soulja Girl"
- Straight Line Stitch - "Black Veil," "What You Do to Me," "Remission"Straight Line Stitch featuring Jamey Jasta - "Taste of Ashes"
- Sworn Enemy - "As Real as It Gets," "Scared of the Unknown"
- The Distance - "Inspired by You," "And If"
- Three 6 Mafia - "Lolli Lolli (Pop That Body)"
- Trivium - "Like Light to the Flies," "Pull Harder on the Strings of Your Martyr," "Dying in Your Arms," and "Entrance to Conflagration"
- Twelve Tribes - "Venus Complex"
- Tyga - "Coconut Juice"
- Unearth - "The Great Dividers"
- Unwritten Law - "Starships and Apocalypse"
- Unk - "2 Step," "Hit the Dance Floor," "Show Out"
- V.I.C. - "Wobble," "Get Silly"
- The Vincent Black Shadow - "Fears in the Water"
- Yo Gotti - Yo Gotti - "5 Star"
- Yung Berg - "Sexy Lady", "The Business," "Sexy Lady (Remix)"
- Yung Joc - "Yeah Boy"

== Filmography ==
- 1999: Colorz of Rage
- 2000: Da Hip Hop Witch
- 2002: Urban Massacre
- 2004: Fear Factory: All Tapped Out (Video)
- 2005: Anthrax: Alive 2 - The DVD (Video)
- 2005: Taste of Chaos (Video)
- 2006: The System Within
- 2010: Guns N' Roses - Forever Together (South American Tour 2010 Documentary)
- 2011: juice
- 2020: Cracka

== Awards ==
- MTV Best Video Award for "Grand Theft Autumn/Where Is Your Boy" by Fall Out Boy
