= Dedication 3 =

Mixtape by Lil Wayne
- Released: November 14, 2008
- Genre: Hip-hop
- Length: 73:37
- Label: Young Money/Aphilliates Music Group
- Producers: DJ Drama, various
- Compiler: DJ Drama

Lil Wayne chronology
Tha Carter III (2008)	Dedication 3 (2008)	No Ceilings (2009)

Professional ratings
Review scores
Source	Rating
AllMusic	link
Pitchfork	(3.7/10) link
Robert Christgau	(3-star Honorable Mention)

Dedication 3 is the eighth mixtape by American rapper Lil Wayne, hosted by DJ Drama. It is the sequel to its predecessors, The Dedication and the highly successful Dedication 2, becoming the third in Lil Wayne's "Gangsta Grillz" series. Lil Wayne also told MTV, "Tha Carter IV is nice but you need to be looking for Dedication 3". Although Dedication 3 was a major success, it failed to match that of its predecessors despite gaining some attention. Besides the interludes, a majority of the mixtape has Wayne using auto-tune and rapping alongside artists signed to his label, Young Money Entertainment.

== Track listing ==
- All tracks were arranged by DJ Drama.

#	Title	Length	Producer(s)	Featured guest(s)	Sample(s)
1	"Welcome Back"	0:57			
2	"Dedication 3"	6:53	Don Cannon	Gudda Gudda, Willie the Kid & Mack Maine	"The Art of Storytellin' Part 4" by Outkast
3	"What Else Is There to Do"	1:02			
4	"Dick Pleaser"	4:00		Jae Millz	"Couldn't Be a Better Player" by Lil Jon featuring Too $hort
5	"Ain't I"	2:48	B Franks	Jae Millz	"Ain't I" by Yung L.A.
6	"You Love Me, I Hate You"	1:45			
7	"Bang Bang"	3:57	Soulja Boy	Jae Millz & Gudda Gudda	"Let Me Get Em" by Soulja Boy
8	"The Other Side"	4:39		La the Darkman, Jae Millz & Gudda Gudda	"Fuck tha Other Side" by Dunk Ryders
9	"My Weezy"	4:32	Big E	Shanell, Lil Twist & Tyga	"My Dougie" by Lil Wil
10	"A Dedication"	0:50			
11	"She's a Ryder"	4:58	Midnight Black	Gudda Gudda	"Who Hotter Than Me" by Plies
12	"Still I Rise"	3:11	Danja	Nicki Minaj	"No Matter What" by T.I.
13	"Magic"	3:10	Pimp C	Gudda Gudda	"Wood Wheel" by UGK
14	"Do's and Dont's of Young Money"	2:01			
15	"Whoever You Like"	4:38	Jim Jonsin	Jae Millz & Gudda Gudda	"Whatever You Like" by T.I.
16	"That Was Easy!"	0:18			
17	"Get Bizzy"	3:12	Soulja Boy	Gudda Gudda	"Get Silly" by V.I.C.
18	"I Got That Gangsta"	3:11	Soopafly	La the Darkman & Willie the Kid	"Who Got Some Gangsta Shit?" by Snoop Dogg
19	"A Message to the DJ's"	1:02			
20	"Stuntin'"	4:08	David Banner	Drake	"Get Like Me" by David Banner
21	"Dedicated"	1:28			
22	"Put On for the Game"	4:43	Drumma Boy	Tyga & Gudda Gudda	"Put On" by Young Jeezy
23	"Dedication 4????????"	6:26	V12 The Hitman		

== Charts ==
=== Weekly charts ===
Chart (2009)	Peak position
US Billboard 200	111
US Top R&B/Hip-Hop Albums (Billboard)	28
US Top Rap Albums (Billboard)	9
US Independent Albums (Billboard)	12

=== Year-end charts ===
Chart (2009)	Position
US Top R&B/Hip-Hop Albums (Billboard)	78
