= I15 =

I15 may refer to:

- Interstate 15, a north–south Interstate Highway in the United States of America
- Polikarpov I-15, a Soviet fighter aircraft
- I15 (band), a band
- Japanese submarine I-15, of the Imperial Japanese Navy
- Älvsborg Regiment (I 15) a former Swedish Army infantry regiment
