= Let Me Get Em =

"Let Me Get 'em"

Promotional single by Soulja Boy

from the album souljaboytellem.com
- Released: 2007
- Recorded: 2007
- Genre: Pop rap; dance-pop; snap
- Length: 3:21
- Label: Stacks on Deck Entertainment; Collipark; HHH; Interscope
- Songwriter(s): DeAndre Way
- Producer(s): DeAndre Way

Soulja Boy singles chronology
"Yahhh!" (2008)	"Let Me Get 'em" (2007)	"Swing (remix)" (2008)

"Let Me Get 'em" is a promo single from rap artist Soulja Boy's first studio album souljaboytellem.com. The song peaked number 15 on the Bubbling Under R&B/Hip-Hop Singles.

== Music video ==
The music video premiered on BET in February, 2008. The music video is in black and white showing friends of Soulja Boy doing the "Pool Palace", and girls dancing. At the end of the clip, it shows a sample of Soulja Boy and his friends all by a car singing a track on the album, "Snap and Roll." Cameos are made by S.O.D. Money Gang member Arab, and Collipark artist Hurricane Chris.

== Song information ==
The track provides a warning at the beginning of the song, stating that the song is only a dance.

No official remix was made to the song, but Lil Wayne did a freestyle to the song for his mixtape Dedication 3, he titled it "Bang Bang", and featured guests are Gudda Gudda and Jae Millz.

== Charts ==
Chart (2008)	Peak position
U.S. Billboard Bubbling Under R&B/Hip-Hop Singles	15
