= Donk (song) =

2008 single by Soulja Boy

Single by Soulja Boy Tellem

from the album souljaboytellem.com
- Released: 2008
- Recorded: 2007
- Genre: Southern hip hop
- Label: Stacks on Deck Entertainment; Collipark; HHH; Interscope
- Songwriter: DeAndre Way
- Producer: DeAndre Way

Soulja Boy Tellem singles chronology
"Swing" (Remix) (2008)	"Donk" (2008)	"Marco Polo" (2008)

"Donk" is the fourth single on the debut studio album souljaboytellem.com recorded in 2007 and released in 2008 by U.S. rapper and YouTuber Soulja Boy.

== Remix ==
A remix to the song was released in mid-2008. The remix features fellow Atlanta rapper Yung Joc.

== Track listing ==
CD single

1. "Donk"
2. "Yak!" (featuring Arab) (Wideboys Remix, Bassline Mix)

12" single

1. "Donk" (Main)
2. "Donk" (Instrumental)
3. "Donk" (Acapella)

== Samples ==
This song was sampled on multiple tracks:

- "Pop It 4 Pimp", by Bun B, Webbie and Juvenile. The "Yup!" and the "Shake som wit' it!" lyrics are what that song samples.
- "Itty Bitty Piggy", by Nicki Minaj
- "Morning Dew (Donk) (Remix)", by Beyoncé & Jay-Z.

== Charts ==
Chart (2008)	Peak position
Australia Physical Singles (ARIA)	30
US Bubbling Under Hot 100 (Billboard)	21
US Hot R&B/Hip-Hop Songs (Billboard)	37
US Hot Rap Songs (Billboard)	22

== Release history ==
Release dates and formats for "Donk"
Region	Date	Format	Label	Ref.
Australia	September 15, 2008	CD single	Universal	
