= Souljaboytellem.com =

Studio album by Soulja Boy Tell 'Em
- Released: October 2, 2007
- Studios: Collipark Studios (College Park); Start to Finish Studios (Crowder); Record Plant (Hollywood)
- Genre: Snap
- Length: 49:25
- Labels: SOD; HHH Artists; Collipark; Interscope
- Producers: Soulja Boy; Mr. Collipark (also exec.); Arab; Los Vegaz; The Package Store

Soulja Boy Tell 'Em chronology
| Unsigned and Still Major: Da Album Before Da Album (2007) | Souljaboytellem.com (2007) | iSouljaBoyTellem (2008) |

Singles from Souljaboytellem.com
- 1. "Crank That (Soulja Boy)" Released: May 2, 2007; 2. "Soulja Girl" Released: October 1, 2007; 3. "Yahhh!" Released: December 11, 2007; 4. "Donk" Released: May 4, 2008

Souljaboytellem.com is the debut studio album and major label debut by American rapper and producer Soulja Boy Tell 'Em. It was released on October 2, 2007, by his Stacks on Deck (SOD) label, Collipark Music and Interscope Records. The album was anticipated by the mixtape Unsigned and Still Major: Da Album Before Da Album, released as its prelude. Souljaboytellem.com's only guest appearances are from fellow rapper Arab and R&B group i15, while Soulja Boy handled the vast majority of its production. The album was supported by four singles: "Crank That (Soulja Boy)", "Soulja Girl" featuring i15, "Yahhh!" featuring Arab, and "Donk". "Crank That" became the most successful song from the album, spending seven weeks at number one on the U.S. Billboard Hot 100.

A snap album with repetitive lyrics about dancing and clothes featuring a minimal production, Souljaboytellem.com debuted at number 4 on the US Billboard 200, selling 117,000 copies in the first week. The album received generally negative reviews from music critics, who criticized the songs' structure, its lyrical content and production. Despite being generally panned by critics, Souljaboytellem.com is credited with paving the way for a new generation of recording artists developing their career on the internet.

== Background ==
In a 2007 interview, when asked about what message does he hope to deliver with the album, Soulja Boy said: "I’m trying to tell the people to look out for me—I’m the next generation of hip-hop, it’s a movement what I’m startin’ right now. The album is gonna be crazy—it covers every base of good music: hip-hop, R&B, it’s got humor on there. It’s a very powerful album. And what I’m telling you—you have to listen. When you pay attention to what I’m saying and my lyrics, the things that I do, the trends that I set, the following that I have… it’s like, “Damn,” it gonna be crazy." He also talked about the criticism towards his music, responding to claims that he was "ruining hip-hop": "My defense, I say, they’re probably used to hearing a type of music, and it’s different from mine, and they’re brought up, and they’ve listened to this type of music for so long, and when they hear something like a Soulja Boy, they scared, and they like, “What is this? This is so different!” But so many people like it, so they don’t get it. It really confuses them. They automatically on the defense, they attack. They like, “This is not hip-hop, and this is not what I’m used to listening to.” But it’s so different, and so many people are listenin’ to it."

== Music and lyrics ==
Souljaboytellem.com is a snap album. Its songs were described for being "laced with simplicity", relying on a repetitive formula. The album's lyrical content is mostly made of the song titles being repeated multiple times, and focuses primarily on dancing and clothes. The choruses on Souljaboytellem.com are generally constituted of a single spoken phrase repeated roughly 50 times within the span of a three-minute song. The instrumentals are based on minimal mixtures of FL Studio keyboard loops. Exclaim! described the album as a teen version of crunk music.

== Singles ==
The album's lead single, called "Crank That (Soulja Boy)" was released on May 2, 2007. The song topped the US Billboard Hot 100 and then stayed for over 7 weeks; and topped the US Hot Rap Songs, staying there for over five weeks. The song also reached on the top five in Australia, Canada, Ireland, New Zealand and the United Kingdom.

The album's second single, called "Soulja Girl" featuring i15, was released on October 1, 2007. The song peaked at numbers 32, 13 and 6 on the US Billboard Hot 100, Hot R&B/Hip-Hop Songs and Hot Rap Songs charts, respectively. It was able to peak at number 10 in New Zealand.

The album's third single, "Yahhh!" featuring Arab, was released on December 31, 2007. The song peaked at numbers 48, 34 and 14 on the US Billboard Hot 100, Hot R&B/Hip-Hop Songs and Hot Rap Songs charts, respectively. It also reached the top 40 in Australia, Ireland and New Zealand.

The album's fourth and final single, "Donk" was released on May 4, 2008. The single was fared less successful by peaking at numbers 37 and 22 on the Hot R&B/Hip-Hop Songs and Hot Rap Songs charts, respectively.

== Critical reception ==
Professional ratings
Aggregate scores
| Source | Rating |
|---|---|
| Metacritic | 53/100 |
Review scores
| Source | Rating |
| AllMusic | 3.5/5 stars |
| Entertainment Weekly | D |
| Exclaim! | F |
| PopMatters | 1/5 stars |
| RapReviews | 3/10 |
| Sputnikmusic | 1/5 stars |
| The Independent | 3/5 stars |

Souljaboytellem.com was generally panned by music critics. At Metacritic, which assigns a normalized rating out of 100 to reviews from mainstream critics, the album received an average score of 53, based on 9 reviews, indicating "mixed or average reviews". In a negative review, PopMatters said that the album "fails because it's barely memorable, lacking any kind of successor to 'Crank That' to keep Soulja Boy relevant". In a positive review, AllMusic's David Jeffries said that the album "should satisfy giggling Right On! readers with pin-ups in their locker, way too cool mash-up fans that carry gigabytes of club music in their pocket, and all the freaky party people in between". More negative reviews came from Simon Vozick-Levinson of Entertainment Weekly who called the album a "teenage wasteland filled with monotonously looped chants and agonizing blunt-force beats." Fellow EW writer Chris Willman ranked the album number one on his list of the worst albums of 2007, stating that, "If you're seeking a circle of hell lower than the one in which 'Crank That' is ubiquitous, listen to his entire album."

Steve Juon of RapReviews gave the album a 3 out of 10, finding the beats and melodies to be "monotonous", concluding with "The only hoe that got Superman'd on 'SouljaBoyTellEm.com' is anybody who spent $14.99 on this album." Tyler of Sputnikmusic said "To try and explain just how bad the "music" is on this disc is about as much of a masochistic exercise as listening to it. The beats are a mish-mash of shitty keyboard loops and samples from "Crank That". The lyrics, if you can call them that, are rarely no more than the song titles repeated at different tempos". In 2017, Vice wrote that while "Souljaboytellem.com is not a masterpiece (and is far from it)" at the same time it "set a blueprint for how to be a teenage rap star on the internet." In a further retrospective review, Stereogum said “The souljaboytellem.com album definitely sounded like a thrown-together rush-job to cash in on a random-ass hit”. In his review for The Independent, Andy Gill wrote that "over the course of an album the repetitive approach is wearying", singling out the tracks "Donk", "Bapes", and "Yahhh!" for "a lack of significant lyrical content". However, noting that Soulja Boy recorded the entirety of the album on his laptop, Gill concluded that "Soulja Boy's DIY style [...] may be a significant indicator of changes in the genre".

== Commercial performance ==
Souljaboytellem.com debuted at number 4 on the US Billboard 200, selling 117,000 copies in the first week. In its 8th week during the week of November 25, 2007, the album sold 44,000 copies and by then sold 381,000 copies overall. Souljaboytellem.com has sold 949,000 copies in the United States, according to Nielsen Soundscan.

== Track listing ==
| No. | Title | Writer(s) | Producer(s) | Length |
|---|---|---|---|---|
| 1. | "Intro" | DeAndre Way | Soulja Boy | 0:59 |
| 2. | "Crank That (Soulja Boy)" | Way | Soulja Boy | 3:41 |
| 3. | "Sidekick" | Way; Jonathan "Swole" Dumas | Swole; John Boy | 3:59 |
| 4. | "Snap & Roll" | Way | Soulja Boy | 3:45 |
| 5. | "Bapes" (featuring Arab) | Way; Abrahim "Arab" Mustafa | Soulja Boy | 3:54 |
| 6. | "Let Me Get Em" | Way | Soulja Boy | 3:21 |
| 7. | "Donk" | Way | Soulja Boy | 3:12 |
| 8. | "Yahhh!" (featuring Arab) | Way; Mustafa | Soulja Boy | 3:10 |
| 9. | "Pass It to Arab" (featuring Arab) | Way; Mustafa | Arab | 3:58 |
| 10. | "Soulja Girl" (featuring i15) | Way; Carlos "Los Vegaz" Thorton; Michael Crooms | Los Vegaz; Mr. Collipark | 3:07 |
| 11. | "Booty Meat" | Way | Soulja Boy | 3:36 |
| 12. | "Report Card" (featuring Arab) | Way; Mustafa; Jamal Jones; Maurice Richards; Robert Crawford; Gregory Williams; Robert Debarge | Soulja Boy | 3:42 |
| 13. | "She Thirsty" | Way | Soulja Boy | 3:38 |
| 14. | "Don’t Get Mad" | Way; Wright | John Boy | 4:18 |

iTunes Store bonus track
| No. | Title | Writer(s) | Producer(s) | Length |
|---|---|---|---|---|
| 15. | "Nope" | Way | Soulja Boy | 2:33 |

Sample credits

- "Report Card" – contains samples of "Throw Some D's" performed by Rich Boy.

== Personnel ==
Adapted from the Souljaboytellem.com liner notes.

- John Frye: mixing (Stankonia Studios; Atlanta, GA)
- Gary Fry: assistant engineering
- Dave "Hard Drive" Pensado: mixing ("Soulja Girl"; Larabee North Studios)
- Michael "Mr. ColliPark" Crooms: executive producer
- Kevin "Coach K" Lee: A&R
- Orlando McGhee: A&R
- Kevin Black: A&R
- Christen Gallope: creative
- Cliff Feiman: production manager
- SLANG Inc.: art direction
- Dave Hill: photography
- Mark Star: Soulja Boy Tellem logo design

== Charts ==
=== Weekly charts ===
Weekly chart performance for Souljaboytellem.com
| Chart (2007) | Peak position |
|---|---|
| Australian Urban Albums (ARIA) | 11 |
| French Albums (SNEP) | 132 |
| New Zealand Albums (RMNZ) | 9 |
| UK R&B Albums (Official Charts) | 24 |
| US Billboard 200 | 4 |
| US Top R&B/Hip-Hop Albums (Billboard) | 4 |
| US Top Rap Albums (Billboard) | 1 |

=== Year-end charts ===
Year-end chart performance for Souljaboytellem.com
| Chart (2007) | Position |
|---|---|
| US Billboard 200 | 172 |
| US Top R&B/Hip-Hop Albums (Billboard) | 72 |
| Chart (2008) | Position |
| US Billboard 200 | 63 |
| US Top R&B/Hip-Hop Albums (Billboard) | 32 |
| US Top Rap Albums (Billboard) | 13 |

== Certifications ==
Certifications for Souljaboytellem.com
| Region | Certification | Certified units/sales |
|---|---|---|
| New Zealand (RMNZ) | 2× Platinum | 30,000^{‡} |
^{‡} Sales+streaming figures based on certification alone.

== Release history ==
Release dates and formats for Souljaboytellem.com
| Region | Date | Format | Label | Ref. |
|---|---|---|---|---|
| Canada | October 2, 2007 | CD | Universal | |
| Germany | November 9, 2007 | CD | Universal | |
| Japan | December 5, 2007 | CD | Universal | |
| Australia | December 17, 2007 | CD | Universal | |
| Japan | November 19, 2008 | CD | Universal | |

== See also ==
- Billboard number-one R&B/hip-hop albums of 2007
