= Crank That (Soulja Boy) =

2007 single by Soulja Boy Tell 'Em

Single by Soulja Boy Tell'em

from the album souljaboytellem.com
- Released: May 2, 2007
- Recorded: 2006–2007
- Studio: Start2Finish (Kansas City, Kansas); Collipark Studio (College Park, Georgia)
- Genre: Pop rap; snap; novelty
- Length: 3:42
- Label: Collipark; Interscope; HHH
- Songwriter: DeAndre Way
- Producer: Soulja Boy

Soulja Boy singles chronology
"Crank That (Soulja Boy)" (2007)	"Soulja Girl" (2007)

Music video
- "Crank That (Soulja Boy)" on YouTube

"Crank That (Soulja Boy)" is the debut single by American rapper Soulja Boy Tell 'Em. It served as the lead single from his debut studio album, souljaboytellem.com (2007) and accompanies the Soulja Boy dance. The song is recognized by its looping steelpan riff. It caused what has been called "the biggest dance fad since the Macarena", with an instructional YouTube video for the dance surpassing 27 million views by early 2008.

"Crank That (Soulja Boy)" spent seven weeks at number one on the U.S. Billboard Hot 100 in the fall of 2007, and was the number 21 on the Rolling Stone magazine's list of the 100 Best Songs of 2007. The song received a nomination for a Grammy Award for Best Rap Song at the 50th Grammy Awards but lost to Kanye West's song "Good Life". On January 6, 2008, it became the first song ever to sell 3 million digital copies in the US. In 2009 it was named the 23rd most successful song of the 2000s on the Billboard Hot 100 Songs of the Decade. It had sold 5,080,000 downloads in the US by February 2014. Outside of the United States, "Crank That (Soulja Boy)" peaked within the top ten of the charts in Australia, Canada, New Zealand, and the United Kingdom.

== Production and release ==
Soulja Boy—real name DeAndre Way—was raised in Batesville, Mississippi. As a teenager, his uncle gifted him a demo copy of FL Studio. In 2005, he registered an account on the online music service SoundClick, and began sharing his songs on the site. Primarily by means of trickery and false advertisement, he executed various schemes to increase his brand name recognition, and soon expanded his artistic reach to MySpace and blogs. He misled users on the peer-to-peer platform LimeWire by changing his songs' metadata to whichever songs were popular at the time, in an attempt to reach out to more listeners. Within time, the rapper began to garner a significant number of streams and shares. His songs stylistically emulate the sound of Atlanta hip hop in the mid-aughts, particularly the briefly popular snap music fad that occurred in the Atlanta hip hop scene during the late 2000s.

In 2006, the phrase "crank dat"—a lyrical invitation to dance—became a small phenomenon in mainly online hip-hop circles; users uploaded videos of different dance routines set to an increasing number of songs with the title phrase. An early version of the song, titled "Crank Dat Dance Remix", was uploaded June 14, 2006 to SoundClick; another iteration, titled "Crank Dat Jump Rope", debuted a month later. "Crank That"—as publicly titled upon major-label release—was self-produced by Way in the unregistered demo copy of FL Studio, utilizing only the software's most basic library of sounds. The song is musically repetitive and sparse, incorporating snaps, a steel drum pattern, centered around a meaningless chant: "Yoooouuuulll!" Way reportedly wrote and recorded the song in ten minutes. The original recording of the song was made at Way's home, and subsequently revised and updated for its final release. Way first posted the song, along with an instructional how-to, to his MySpace on February 25, 2007.

The song grew in popularity steadily, attracting the attention of music producer Mr. Collipark, who initially balked at its unexpected recognition. The song led Soulja Boy to sign with Collipark's imprint on Interscope Records, who released the final, professionally-recorded song on May 2, 2007 in the U.S.; a global release followed on June 27.

Soulja Boy stated in a 2007 interview that prior to his Interscope deal he did not realize the song would "catapult [him to fame]". He said: "I didn’t know because before the deal I was pushin’ another single—I got many songs, but like when I landed a deal we just had to go with this one, but I didn’t know this one was just gonna be the one [or] that was just gonna be a real breakthrough for me."

== Dance and music video ==
The Crank That dance

Inspired by recent dance crazes that had popularized some rappers from Atlanta, Soulja Boy (DeAndre Way) and his friends invented the dance moves that gave rise to "Crank That": As summarized by The Wall Street Journal, "dancers bounce back on their heels, ripple their hands, crank their wrists like motorcyclists, then lunge into a Superman pose".

The music video (directed by Dale Resteghini) begins in the "ColliPark Residence" with Sincostan Ak Flame and J Fresh imitating the Soulja Boy dance. Mr. Collipark takes a keen interest in the children's movements, leading him to contact Soulja Boy in an attempt to sign him up to "Collipark Records". His instinct is confirmed when he notices a number of people performing the dance, en route to meeting with Soulja Boy.

This video premiered on BET's 106 & Park on August 9, 2007. It features Bow Wow, Omarion, Unk, Baby D, Jibbs, Rich Boy and others doing the signature "Soulja Boy Dance". The video also ranked at number 1 on BET's Notarized: Top 100 Videos of 2007 countdown.

== Critical reception ==
Digital Spy criticized the track, calling it "a mind-numbingly tedious pop-rap single: three minutes and 45 seconds of inane hollering over a simple steel drum melody, some nifty hi-hat and a finger-click beat". Stereogum commented that "'Crank That (Soulja Boy)' is striking in its weird energy. There’s no nuance to Soulja Boy’s rapping, but there’s a commanding heft to his voice. He multitracks himself, making himself sound like an army, and then he barks out commands". Sputnikmusic stated that "Crank That" is "intolerable" and "nothing but Soulja shouting out the moves to the accompanying dance". AllMusic named it a "killer pop-rap single", mentioning that it "combines a steel drum hook with a fat-bottomed Mississippi beat, but it's the bizarre lyrics that matter most as questions like "Why me crank that Robocop?" sit next to nonsensical called-out dance instructions." Rap Reviews felt that the song "is so stupid it's brilliant or so retarded it's dragging all of hip-hop down into the gutter." Entertainment Weekly panned the song, saying that it belongs to "a circle of hell".

== Legacy ==
"Crank That" has been widely regarded as among the earliest digital hit singles of its kind. Music journalist Tom Breihan devoted a chapter of his 2022 book The Number Ones to examining the legacy of "Crank That", with particular regards to Soulja Boy's self-driven marketing and nascent online popularity.

Soulja Boy bypassed any and all gatekeepers by going straight to the Internet. He did this, at least at first, without established advisers or major-label money behind him. [... In the twenty-first] century, the Internet has warped and mutated culture in ways that we don’t yet fully understand. But while most of us have scrambled to catch up to the disorienting pace of these changes, younger kids have launched themselves into the void, using the confusion to sail past gatekeepers and make names for themselves. Soulja Boy did it first.

Soulja Boy himself has argued the point, remarking in an interview with Complex: "I motherfuckin’ showed you how to get famous from your bedroom on the internet! [...] They’ll talk about it in history books later."

Due to the song's simple instrumental structure, a community of music producers began speedrunning the song in FL Studio, by dragging the exact same stock samples and replicating the musical patterns as fast as possible. While some YouTubers have done this prior, YouTube and SoundCloud user Simon Servida spearheaded this speedrun, with several fellow producers following suit. The current record stands at 13.68 seconds.

== Charts ==
=== Weekly charts ===
Chart (2007–2008)	Peak position
Australia (ARIA)	3
Australian Urban (ARIA)	2
Austria (Ö3 Austria Top 40)	53
Belgium (Ultratip Bubbling Under Flanders)	6
Belgium (Ultratip Bubbling Under Wallonia)	7
Canada Hot 100 (Billboard)	5
Europe (Eurochart Hot 100)	7
France (SNEP)	29
Germany (GfK)	29
Ireland (IRMA)	3
Lithuania (EHR)	3
New Zealand (Recorded Music NZ)	2
Scottish Singles Sales (Official Charts)	4
Switzerland (Schweizer Hitparade)	67
UK Singles (Official Charts)	2
UK Hip Hop/R&B (Official Charts)	1
US Billboard Hot 100	1
US Pop Airplay (Billboard)	9
US Hot R&B/Hip-Hop Songs (Billboard)	3
US Hot Rap Songs (Billboard)	1
US Rhythmic Airplay (Billboard)	1

=== Year-end charts ===
Chart (2007)	Position
New Zealand (Recorded Music NZ)	46
UK Singles (OCC)	70
US Billboard Hot 100	20
US Hot R&B/Hip-Hop Songs (Billboard)	28
US Hot Rap Songs (Billboard)	6
US Rhythmic (Billboard)	9

Chart (2008)	Position
Australia (ARIA)	23
Europe (Eurochart Hot 100)	33
Canada (Canadian Hot 100)	51
New Zealand (Recorded Music NZ)	49
UK Singles (OCC)	56
US Billboard Hot 100	54

=== Decade-end charts ===
Chart (2000–2009)	Position
US Billboard Hot 100	23

=== All-time charts ===
Chart (1958–2018)	Position
US Billboard Hot 100	151

== Certifications ==
Region	Certification	Certified units/sales
Australia (ARIA)	Platinum	70,000^{^}
Brazil (Pro-Música Brasil)	3× Platinum	180,000^{‡}
Denmark (IFPI Danmark)	Gold	45,000^{‡}
Germany (BVMI)	Platinum	300,000^{‡}
New Zealand (RMNZ)	3× Platinum	90,000^{‡}
United Kingdom (BPI)	Platinum	600,000^{‡}
United States (RIAA) Mastertone	3× Platinum	3,000,000^{*}
^{*} Sales figures based on certification alone.^{^} Shipments figures based on certification alone.^{‡} Sales+streaming figures based on certification alone.

== Release history ==
Region	Date	Format(s)	Label	Ref.
United States	May 8, 2007	Contemporary hit radio	Collipark; Interscope	
