= Soulja Girl =

2007 single by Soulja Boy

Single by Soulja Boy featuring I-15

from the album Souljaboytellem.com
- Released: October 1, 2007
- Genre: Pop-rap; R&B
- Length: 3:07
- Label: Collipark; Interscope; Stacks on Deck Entertainment; HHH
- Songwriter(s): Michael Crooms; C. Thorton; DeAndre Way
- Producer(s): Los Vegaz; Mr. Collipark

Soulja Boy Tellem singles chronology
"Crank That (Soulja Boy)" (2007)	"Soulja Girl" (2007)	"Yahhh!" (2007)

i15 singles chronology
"Soulja Girl" (2007)	"Lost in Love" (2008)

"Soulja Girl" is the second single from American rapper Soulja Boy's debut studio album souljaboytellem.com. Although the song was a top 40 hit in the United States and New Zealand, it did not follow the success of the prior single, "Crank That (Soulja Boy)" in other countries. The song features the short-lived R&B group I-15. The song peaked at number thirty-two on the Billboard Hot 100, on the week ending December 8, 2007. The video ranked at number 36 on BET's Notarized: Top 100 Videos of 2007 countdown.

== Charts ==
=== Weekly charts ===
Chart (2007)	Peak position
Canada (Canadian Hot 100)	75
New Zealand (Recorded Music NZ)	10
US Billboard Hot 100	32
US Hot R&B/Hip-Hop Songs (Billboard)	13
US Hot Rap Songs (Billboard)	6
US Rhythmic (Billboard)	13
US Pop 100 (Billboard)	45

=== Year-end charts ===
Chart (2008)	Position
US Hot R&B/Hip-Hop Songs (Billboard)	91
