= Yahhh! =

2007 single by Soulja Boy

Single by Soulja Boy featuring Arab

from the album souljaboytellem.com
- Released: December 11, 2007
- Genre: Southern hip hop
- Length: 3:11
- Label: Collipark; Interscope
- Songwriters: DeAndre Way; Abrahim Mustafa
- Producers: DeAndre Way; Savon Jacobs

Soulja Boy Tellem singles chronology
"Soulja Girl" (2007)	"Yahhh!" (2007)	"Swing (Remix)" (2008)

Music video
- "Yahhh! / Report Card" on YouTube

"Yahhh!" (also known as "Yahhh Bitch Yahhh", censored as "Yahhh Trick Yahhh") is a song by American rapper Soulja Boy, released by Collipark Music and Interscope Records on December 11, 2007 as the third single from his debut studio album souljaboytellem.com (2007). It features fellow American rapper Arab.

== Composition ==
According to Stereogum, "Yahhh!" is "a spirited ode to the joy of yelling in people's faces". Vice defined it a "gibberish filled" song, where Soulja Boy "incoherently yells 'Yahh trick yahhhh…uhblablaublabla." Evan Sawdey of PopMatters wrote that Soulja Boy "warns fans seeking autographs to stay away from him or else he’ll "hafta knock your lights out", before screaming incoherent, angry phrases at his followers."

== Music video ==
On January 8, 2008, the video for "Yahhh!" premiered on BET's Access Granted and on Yahoo! Music. The video parodies people trying to get Soulja Boy's autograph, including Duane Chapman of Dog the Bounty Hunter, an imitation of Hillary Clinton and an imitation of Britney Spears, who appears to be intoxicated. The video also featured a stop-motion animated puppet that interacted with the cast.

After the main "Yahhh!" video, a short clip of Soulja Boy's song "Report Card" plays and features Soulja Boy, Arab and others dancing to the song at a school. The video ends with Soulja Boy stating that he "made straight As," and he also tells kids to stay in school.

== Critical reception ==
The song was universally panned by critics. Alex Fletcher of Digital Spy gave the song one star out of five, and wrote, "Based around Soulja boy and pal Arab screaming incomprehensible gibberish, the repeated line "Yahhh, Trick, Yahhh!" is more irritating than a life's supply of itching powder, while the bargain bucket synth soundtrack sounds like an old Nokia ringtone." Jeff Weiss of LA Weekly wrote that it was a "legitimate attempt to dethrone 'My Humps' for its ignominious distinction as the most dumbest song ever recorded."

== Charts ==
=== Weekly charts ===
Charts (2007−2008)	Peak position
Australia (ARIA)	35
Australian Urban (ARIA)	12
Canada Hot 100 (Billboard)	72
Ireland (IRMA)	18
Lithuania (EHR)	3
New Zealand (Recorded Music NZ)	3
UK Singles (Official Charts)	49
UK Hip Hop/R&B (Official Charts)	5
US Billboard Hot 100	48
US Hot R&B/Hip-Hop Songs (Billboard)	34
US Hot Rap Songs (Billboard)	14
US Pop 100 (Billboard)	48

=== Year-end charts ===
Chart (2008)	Position
New Zealand (Recorded Music NZ)	32

== Certifications ==
Region	Certification	Certified units/sales
New Zealand (RMNZ)	Gold	7,500^{*}
^{*} Sales figures based on certification alone.
