= Soulja Boy =

American rapper and songwriter (born 1990)

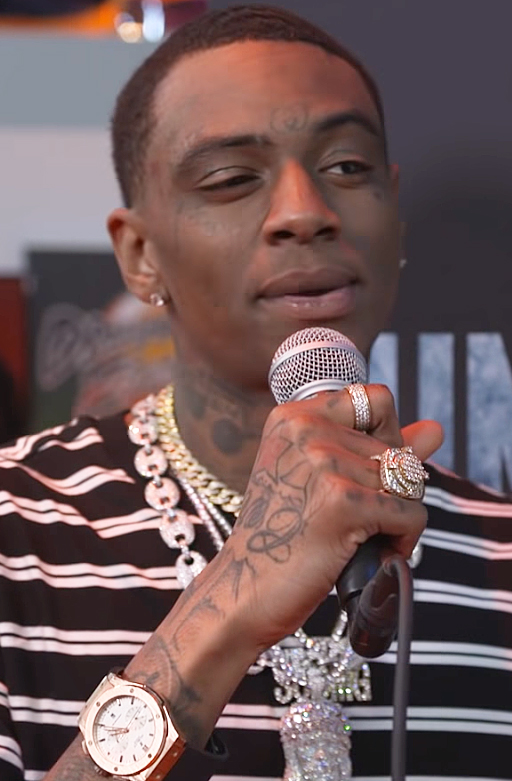
- Way in an interview with Bandai Namco Entertainment at E3 2018

Background information
- Also known as: Soulja Boy Tell 'Em; Big Draco
- Born: DeAndre Cortez Way; July 28, 1990 (age 36); Chicago, Illinois, U.S.
- Origin: Atlanta, Georgia, U.S.
- Genres: Southern hip-hop; gangsta rap; snap; pop rap
- Occupations: Rapper; songwriter; record producer; actor
- Works: Discography; production
- Years active: 2004–present
- Labels: Stacks on Deck; Collipark; Interscope (former)
- Children: 1
- Website: souljaboy.net

DeAndre Cortez Way (born July 28, 1990), better known by his stage name Soulja Boy (formerly Soulja Boy Tell 'Em), is an American rapper. He rose to prominence with his self-released 2007 debut single, "Crank That (Soulja Boy)", which peaked atop the US Billboard Hot 100 for seven non-consecutive weeks. After a commercial re-release by Collipark Music, an imprint of Interscope Records, the song and its follow-up, "Soulja Girl", both preceded his debut studio album, Souljaboytellem.com (2007). While critical reception was generally negative, the album peaked at number four on the US Billboard 200 and spawned the single "Yahhh!"

His second album, iSouljaBoyTellem (2008)—supported by the Billboard Hot 100-top 20 singles "Turn My Swag On" and "Kiss Me thru the Phone" (featuring Sammie)—was met with moderate commercial reception and a further decline in critical reception. Way was listed at number 18 on the Forbes list of Hip-Hop Cash Kings of 2010, as he earned US$7 million that year. His third album, The DeAndre Way (2010)—supported by the top 40 single "Pretty Boy Swag"—saw a steeper decline in commercial reception, leading him to part ways with Interscope in favor of an independent career.

Way is noted for his pioneering use of grassroots social media and digital marketing strategies during his mainstream popularity. Outside of recording, he has pursued side ventures including video game development, record production for other artists, and his record label Stacks on Deck Entertainment, through which he has signed rappers including Lil B and Riff Raff. He has received a Grammy Award nomination, as well as three BET Award and four Teen Choice Award nominations.

== Early life ==
Way was born in Chicago, Illinois, and at age six moved to Atlanta, Georgia, where he became interested in rap music. At age 14, he moved to Batesville, Mississippi, with his father.

== Musical career ==
=== 2004–2007: Early recordings and building an Internet following ===
Way's father provided a recording studio for Way to explore his musical ambitions. In early 2005, he was a frequent poster on the website Newgrounds, and in November that same year, Way posted on the music website SoundClick. Following positive reviews on the site, he established accounts on YouTube and Myspace. In March 2007, he released his first independent album, Unsigned and Still Major: Da Album Before Da Album.

=== 2007–2011: Souljaboytellem.com, iSouljaBoyTellem, and The DeAndre Way ===
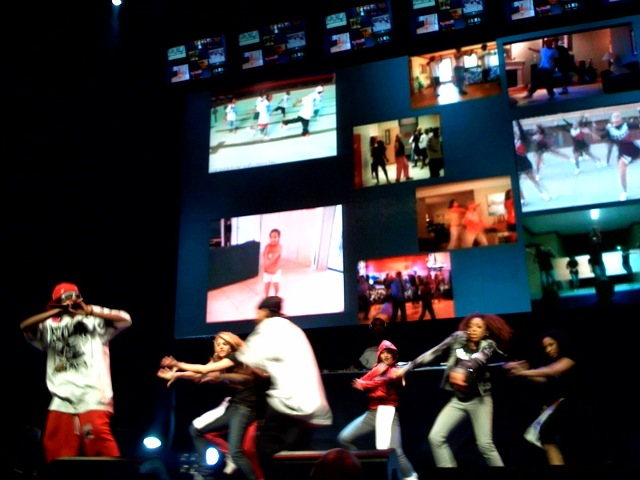
Soulja Boy performing "Crank That (Soulja Boy)" in February 2008.

Also in March 2007, Way recorded "Crank That (Soulja Boy)", followed by a low-budget video demonstrating the "Crank That" dance. On May 2, "Crank That" was released as a single; by month's end, it had received its first airplay, and Way met with Mr. Collipark to sign a recording contract with his record label Collipark Music, which later entered a joint venture with Interscope Records shortly after. On August 12, "Crank That" was used on the television series Entourage, and on September 1 it topped the US Billboard Hot 100 and Hot RingMasters charts. During the 50th Annual Grammy Awards, "Crank That (Soulja Boy)" was nominated for Best Rap Song, losing to Kanye West's and T-Pain's "Good Life".

Way's major label debut album, Souljaboytellem.com, was released in the United States on October 2, peaking at number four on both the Billboard 200 and Top R&B/Hip-Hop Albums charts. The album was reportedly recorded using just the demo version of FL Studio. Souljaboytellem.com received a favorable review from Allmusic but mainly negative reviews from other sources, such as Entertainment Weekly. Several reviewers credited Soulja Boy with spearheading a new trend in hip-hop, while speculating that he would be a one-hit wonder.

The follow-up to Souljaboytellem.com, iSouljaBoyTellem, was released on December 16, 2008, to negative critical reception. The first single from the album, "Bird Walk", peaked at number 40 on the Billboard Hot R&B/Hip-Hop Songs chart and the top 20 on the Hot Rap Tracks chart. It was performed on YouTube Live on November 22, 2008, with an introduction from MC Hammer. "Kiss Me Thru the Phone" (featuring Sammie) followed, peaking at number three on the Hot 100 and number one on the Hot Rap Tracks charts. Chris Brown was Way's first choice to sing the hook, but respectfully turned down the offer. Way then tried to do it on his own with Auto-Tune but found it unacceptable. The song sold over 2 million digital copies in the U.S., becoming Way's second to reach two million downloads. On January 26, 2009, Way released the third single, "Turn My Swag On". It topped the U.S. rap charts and peaked at number 19 on the Billboard Hot 100. As of August 23, 2009, it has sold more than 1 million digital downloads in the U.S.

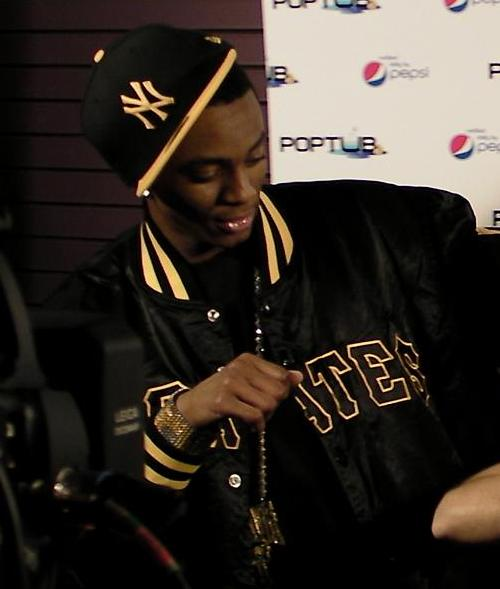
Soulja Boy at YouTube Live in November 2008.

Way said his third studio album, The DeAndre Way, was intended to be his most personal and successful album thus far. He said he wished to collaborate with artists such as Jay-Z, Lil Wayne, Kanye West and Eminem. The album's lead single, "POW", was released in January 2009 but failed to garner success and was dubbed a promo single. On October 30, 2009, Way released three mixtapes: Paranormal Activity, Dat Piff and Cortez. It was announced on February 18, 2010, that the first single from the album was going to be "All Black Everything", but the single was canceled and the track was put on another promotional mixtape, Legendary. The album's title was changed to Dre in an early 2010 commercial with a video snippet for "Do It Big" as the first single, but this was also canceled. The album title reverted to The DeAndre Way in July 2010. On June 8, 2010, the album's official lead single was "Pretty Boy Swag". It reached number 34 on the Billboard Hot 100, number six on the Hot R&B/Hip-Hop Songs chart and number five on the Rap Songs chart. The album's second single was due to be "Digital", which was instead used on his promotional mixtape Best Rapper. Then it was announced that "Speakers Going Hammer" was going to be the second single, but "Blowing Me Kisses" was released on August 31, 2010, as the second single instead. On October 13, Way performed "Pretty Boy Swag" and a snippet of "Speakers Going Hammer". On October 19, 2010, he released "Speakers Going Hammer" on iTunes; it peaked at number 48 on the Billboard Hot R&B/Hip Hop Songs. Way backed out of the Summerbeatz tour in Australia in November 2010, where he was to have performed alongside Flo Rida, Jay Sean and Travie McCoy, in order to embark on his "Who They Want" tour in support of his upcoming album. The DeAndre Way was released on November 30, 2010, and has so far sold only 70,000 copies, making it Way's lowest-selling album.

=== 2011–2018: Mixtapes, EPs, independent albums, and Loyalty ===
In 2011, Way released a series of mixtapes. The first, on January 22, was titled Smooky and had cartoon cover art of Way doing a 360 on a bicycle. On March 17, Way released the mixtape 1UP which had cover art based on the Naruto anime, with Way stating: "If I was in a video game, this mixtape would advance me to the next level with an extra life. Power up with the new offering." On April 20, Way released his mixtape Juice with cover art based on the film of the same name. Way said he would also release a mini-movie of his own to go along with the mixtape, and that he was headed to greatness with the mixtape. On July 15, Way released his EP mixtape titled Bernaurd Arnault EP (Limited Edition). Then on August 1, Way released another ep mixtape titled 21: EP. On August 31, Way released the mixtape The Last Crown, the cover of the mixtape is based on the artwork the Flammarion Engraving. In September 2011, Way confirmed that he is working on a new album, Promise, which would be released in October. Way also released the cover and title of his second independent album via Twitter, titled Skate Boy, with a notice that it would be available in stores on November 1. On September 19, Way released the mixtape Supreme. On October 30, Skate Boy (Deluxe Edition) was released as a mixtape, rather than an album. On December 30, 2011, Way released another mixtape titled Gold On Deck.

In 2012, Way released additional mixtapes while his album continued to be delayed. On January 9, Way released a mixtape for the beginning of the year, titled 50/13, with the cover based on that of ASAP Rocky's mixtape Live. Love. ASAP. On January 24, Way released a collaboration mixtape with his artist Young L titled Mario & Domo vs. the World with cover art based on the video game Super Mario Bros. On March 23, Way released a mixtape titled OBEY which featured the promotional single "Too Faded". On June 3, 2012, Way talked about his upcoming album Promise and said he has released so many mixtapes in the last two years because he feels he has to put out a lot of music and be as creative as possible. On June 11, Way released another collaboration mixtape with rapper Vinny Chase titled Double Cup City. On September 4, Way released the sequel mixtape Juice II, in which Way returned to his old production style with the beginning lines "Soulja Boy Tell 'Em". It is Way's most-downloaded mixtape. His mixtape titled Young & Flexin was released on November 6. On December 25, 2012, Way released LOUD, which was his first mixtape distributed on iTunes.

2013 was marked by further album delays while Way's record deal expired, and he continued to release mixtapes. On February 22, Way released his first mixtape of the year, titled Foreign. In March, it was rumored that Way was signing to Cash Money Records after getting a face tattoo saying "Rich Gang" the same weekend he was seen with his manager and Cash Money artists Birdman and Bow Wow. This continued after he added "Rich Gang" or "YMCMB" to his social media platforms. Way had earlier reported that he was no longer with Interscope Records after his record deal ended in February. Way also announced that his album Promise had been retitled USA DRE. On March 15, he released the first single from the album, titled "Handsome". Following that, on March 25, he released the EP, All Black. On April 24, Way released his mixtape Foreign 2. Three days later, Way revealed the cover art to his next mixtape titled King Soulja which was released on May 5. On May 26, Way released his second EP titled Cuban Link. On June 13, Way announced another album title change, to Life After Fame, and that it would be released to stores on July 30, 2013. On June 25, Way released his first single from the album titled "Ridin Round" to iTunes, but it was later dubbed a promotional single. On June 30, Way released Life After Fame as a mixtape instead of an album. On September 24, Way released his mixtape titled 23. On November 30, Way released his mixtape The King. On December 28, 2013, rapper/singer Drake collaborated and remixed Way's intro track "We Made It" from his mixtape The King.

In 2014, Way continued work on his fourth studio album while collaborating with other artists and releasing additional mixtapes. On March 18, Way released his first mixtape of the year titled King Soulja 2. On April 20, Way released his first digital album Super Dope, featuring an appearance from rapper Busta Rhymes. On May 19, Way produced, co-wrote and was featured on Nicki Minaj's promotional single "Yasss Bish", which received positive reviews from music critics. On June 8, Way announced that he was currently working on his new mixtape project King Soulja 3, which would feature appearances from Lil Wayne, Drake, Migos, Young Thug and Wiz Khalifa. On June 29, Way released King Soulja 3 as his second digital album via iTunes, featuring appearances from Gudda Gudda and Rich The Kid. On October 31, Way released his mixtape Young Millionaire, featuring appearances from Sean Kingston, Cap.1 and Rich The Kid. On November 17, Way announced via his Instagram that he had signed a new label deal with Universal Music Group and also revealed the title, cover art and release date for his fourth studio album, Loyalty, originally scheduled for release on December 2, 2014, but pushed back to February 3, 2015.

In 2015, following the release of his fourth studio album, Loyalty, Way released additional singles, mixtapes and a digital album. For this upcoming digital album, King Soulja 4, Way released the single "Whippin My Wrist (Too Rich)" on February 27; it charted on the Billboard Trending 140 at number 48. On May 16, Way released his mixtape Swag The Mixtape featuring appearances from Migos, Peewee Longway, Troy Ave, Johnny Cinco, Chief Keef, Pack Strong, Paul Allen, Chella H, Calico Jonez and Kyle Massey. On May 26, fellow Atlanta, Georgia artist Rich The Kid announced that he and Way would be releasing a collaboration album titled Get Rich. On June 3, via Twitter, Way revealed the title, cover art and release date to his upcoming fifth studio album, Blessed, which was scheduled for release on July 28, 2015, but experienced several delays. On June 30, Way released a mixtape titled 25 The Movie. On July 17, Way released a new single titled "Actavis" featuring Migos, taken from his fourth digital album King Soulja 4. On July 23, Way released his mixtape titled M & M: Money and Music. On July 30, through his independent label Stacks on Deck Entertainment, Way released his fourth digital album, King Soulja 4, featuring appearances from Migos, ReeseMoneyBagz, Dae Dot and Sean Kingston. On September 1, Way released the single "Diddy Bop". On September 24, Way released a single titled "Gratata" along with an accompanying music video. On September 28, Way released the mixtape Plug Talk. On November 9, Way premiered a single titled "Make It Rain". On November 24, Way released a mixtape titled S. Beezy.

In 2016, Way released his fifth and sixth digital albums and various mixtapes, singles and videos. On January 14, he released the single "Drop The Top"; on January 24, he premiered its video. On January 24, he released the standalone single "Stephen Curry", named for the NBA player, and on February 6, he released a video for the song. On February 10, he released another mixtape, Finesse EP. On February 14, he released the mixtape King Soulja 5, the fifth installment in his King Soulja mixtape/album series. On March 15, through his independent label, he released his fifth digital album, Stacks On Deck, featuring Agoff, King Reefa, Lil Yachty and Rich The Kid. On May 12, he released the single "Day One". On June 9, through his label Stacks on Deck Entertainment, he released his sixth digital album, Better Late Than Never, featuring Lil Twist and Lil Yachty. On July 23, he released the single "Rockstar". On July 31, he released the mixtape Rockstar. On August 23, he released the sequel mixtape S. Beezy 2. On September 14, he released the single "Max Payne". On September 24, he released the single "Hit Them Folks". On September 26, he released the single "I'm Up Now" featuring Chief Keef. On September 29, he released the mixtape King Soulja 6, the sixth installment in his King Soulja mixtape/album series. On October 25, 2016, Way and Bow Wow released a joint retail mixtape, Ignorant Shit.

=== 2018–present: Breakfast Club interview and How Can You Blame Me? ===
Soulja Boy performing at a concert in January 2019.

In late 2018, Way went on Instagram Live and responded to fan comments suggesting Tyga had the biggest comeback of any artist in 2018. Way angrily claimed he had had the biggest comeback, with a snippet of the video going viral that same day. Later in early 2019, Way made an appearance on the radio show The Breakfast Club, where he defended his statements. A snippet of Way responding to a question about fellow musician Drake became a viral meme following the interview.

Way continued to release singles and two mix-tapes throughout 2019, releasing the first mix-tape, Fuego, on January 10, and the second mix-tape, Tell Ya, on March 25. Way announced on January 18, 2019, he was working on his fifth studio album titled How Can You Blame Me?, (originally titled Blessed), with the album set to be released on July 28. The album was delayed for unknown reasons following Way's 2019 incarceration. On July 28, 2020, following his rising success as a Twitch streamer, Way released the mixtape King Soulja 9, followed by several singles throughout 2020. In late November 2020, Way released the mixtape Swag 3, and continued to release several singles such as Pandemic and CEO at the start of 2021. On February 1, 2021, Way released the mixtape Soulja World, which features frequent collaborator Lil B. In April 2021, Soulja Boy signed a record deal with Virgin Music.

In 2021, Way publicly feuded with rapper Kanye West after his recorded verse was removed from the song "Remote Control" from West's album Donda without prior notice. West later apologised and the pair reconciled. In February 2022, Way appeared as a featured artist on West's album Donda 2. Behind-the-scenes footage later showed Way recording his verse at his home studio with producer Starquake shortly before the album's live performance in Miami.

Way performed at an event hosted by David Sacks celebrating the second inauguration of Donald Trump in January 2025, which sparked some backlash from the left-wing. Way defended his decision to perform at the event, stating that the Trump administration reached out to him and offered him money to perform, while Joe Biden and Kamala Harris did not. He further argued: "Trump wasn't even there. It wasn't even a Trump event. It was the Crypto Ball for crypto. And I'll go again." He would later admit he was "misled by the political nature of the event," according to Newsweek.

== Musical style ==
Speaking on his rudimentary rapping technique and vacuous lyrical style, in a November 2010 interview with XXL Magazine, while Way was explaining how he has grown as an emcee he stated:

I can't keep playin' around, because if you keep playin' around, people are gonna think you're a joke ... At some point, you have to get serious. But don't get it twisted, Soulja doesn't wanna be the next Lupe Fiasco. I don't want to be super-Lupe-Fiasco-lyrical and niggas don't know what the fuck I'm talking about," he added. "I want to be the best," he continued. "I want to be recognized in that category where I'm nominated for Best Rapper with Jay-Z and Kanye and Wayne. I wanna get a Grammy. I want Best Rap Album of the Year ... I've made millions of dollars off of doing my style, but, hey, I can rap, too.

On December 5, 2010, Way clarified this statement that Lupe Fiasco was too "lyrical", explaining that he wanted to keep the rudimentary music style he developed and justified why he doesn't keep a lyrically based flow and more substantially profound lyrical subject matter on every song. According to Way:

[XXL Magazine] didn't [publish] my whole statement. And basically, the interviewer dude, he was asking me why do I make lyrical songs like 'Only God Knows,' 'Born' ... 'The World So Cold,' and why do I make non-lyrical songs like 'Crank That' and 'Pretty Boy Swag'? And he was like, why don't I just be lyrical all the time? And I was telling him on [a] specific song, like 'Pretty Boy Swag,' I ain't wanna be all lyrical. I just wanted to be straight-up, and just be simple, [so] people can get what I'm saying 'cause it's a club song. But I wasn't saying as far as my whole music [output, with] all of my songs, that I don't wanna be rappin' like Lupe Fiasco.

Way further clarified there was no animosity between him and Fiasco and that the two had planned to record a song together.

Way's music has been banned from some school dances for alleged sexual or violent content and/or innuendos. In the original YouTube video for "Shootout", Way demonstrates his dance while holding a handgun in each hand and pretending to shoot into the audience.

== Other ventures ==
=== Stacks on Deck Entertainment ===
Stacks on Deck Entertainment
- Founded: 2004
- Founder: DeAndre "Soulja Boy" Way (CEO); Michael "Miami Mike" Sykes (President)
- Status: Active
- Genre: Hip hop; Southern hip hop
- Country of origin: United States
- Location: Atlanta, Georgia (2007–11); Los Angeles, California (2012–present)

Way founded his record label Stacks on Deck Entertainment (SODMG) in 2004 while he was signed to Interscope and Collipark Music. Since founding the label, he has signed various artists. On May 30, 2016, Way announced that all artists signed to SODMG had been dropped. In 2019, Way re-signed Lil 100 and signed Atlanta artist 24hrs.

Current artists:

Act	Year signed
Soulja Boy (CEO/founder)	2004
Lil 100	2011
24hrs	2019

Former artists

Act
A.Goff
John Boy
Lil B
Riff Raff
JBar/Ja-Bar
Killa Cam
Killa J
M2ThaK aka Big Keezy
Tony The Deity
Shawty Boy
Spinning 9
Bobby World
DJ Wats
Lil Justin
Paul Allen
Soulja Kid
J. Takin
Jay Lody
Jski
King Eazy
King Reefa
Lil E
Maybacc
ReeseMoneyBagz
Arab (Boss Money/SODMG)
Calico Jonez (Swish Gang/SODMG)
Dae Dot
Pack Strong
HoodBoss

Album releases:

- 2007: Unsigned and Still Major: Da Album Before Da Album by Soulja Boy
- 2007: Souljaboytellem.com by Soulja Boy
- 2008: iSouljaBoyTellem by Soulja Boy
- 2010: The DeAndre Way by Soulja Boy
- 2013: All Black (EP) by Soulja Boy
- 2014: Super Dope by Soulja Boy
- 2014: King Soulja 3 by Soulja Boy
- 2015: Loyalty by Soulja Boy
- 2015: The Gold (EP) by A.Goff
- 2015: King Soulja 4 by Soulja Boy
- 2016: Stacks On Deck by Soulja Boy
- 2016: Better Late Than Never by Soulja Boy
- 2016: Rich Soulja 4 Life by Soulja Boy
- 2016: King Soulja 7 by Soulja Boy
- 2017: Big Soulja by Soulja Boy
- 2018: King Soulja 8 by Soulja Boy
- 2018: Best to Ever Do It by Soulja Boy
- 2018: Young Drako by Soulja Boy
- 2018: King By Soulja Boy
- 2019: Fuego By Soulja Boy
- 2020: King Soulja 9 By Soulja Boy
- 2020: Swag 3 By Soulja Boy
- 2021: Soulja World By Soulja Boy
- 2021: I Was The First Rapper By Soulja Boy
- 2021: Big Draco 2 By Soulja Boy

=== Record production ===
Way also produces records, including his own, primarily using the FL Studio digital audio workstation. In September 2007, Way produced V.I.C.'s single "Get Silly", which was certified gold, and Bow Wow's single "Marco Polo". Way's beats often contain the beginning lines "Soulja Boy Tell 'em", but as of late Way has produced beats without these lines. In 2009, it was reported that Way would be producing for Kanye West's fourth studio album, My Beautiful Dark Twisted Fantasy, and Kanye would be producing for Way's third studio album, The DeAndre Way, but for unknown reasons neither of them used each other's beats. On May 13, 2011, Way said he had produced and submitted beats for 50 Cent's fifth studio album, Street King Immortal. In 2013, Way also produced on the track "Wowzers" of Lil Wayne's album I Am Not a Human Being II. On May 6, 2014, during an interview, Way announced that he was producing for Diddy's upcoming album M.M.M. and also for Lil Wayne's upcoming album Tha Carter V. Soulja Boy also produced the song "Yasss Bish" on Nicki Minaj's album The Pinkprint. In April 2016, Soulja Boy received a writing credit on Beyoncé's visual album Lemonade when she interpolated "Turn My Swag On" in the outro of "Hold Up.".

=== Fashion designing ===
On March 5, 2008, Way launched his fashion line of "S.O.D Clothing". That same year Way released his own brand of the popular shoe line "Yums". On February 14, 2012, Way and fashion designer D. Young created the official clothing line "Ocean Gang". In 2012, Way released another line he created, "BLVD. Supply"; the store is located in Los Angeles, California.

=== Acting career ===
On January 7, 2009, Soulja Boy announced that he was to be releasing his own cartoon, Soulja Boy: The Animated Series, but only one episode was released.

In August 2010, Soulja Boy announced a desire to make a film about himself, having told MTV News that he discussed the idea with Nick Cannon. He was later approached by Peter Spirer, who presented his own concept for a documentary about the artist. Directed by Spirer, Soulja Boy: The Movie was released direct-to-video on October 18, 2011, a date that coincided with Soulja Boy's arrest on a drug charge. The film contains live performances from his DeAndre Way Tour and interviews with his father and current and former members of Stacks on Deck Entertainment. The documentary's visual quality was panned by DVD Verdict as a result of poor video transfer, since much of its music detail was taken from YouTube clips.

On April 22, 2011, Way announced that he would make his acting debut playing the main role of Bishop in the Juice remake and that it would air on BET.

In 2013, Way announced and confirmed that he was guest-starring in the upcoming movie Officer Down. On November 12, 2021, he announced upcoming roles on ATL and an upcoming movie role with Machine Gun Kelly.

=== World Poker Fund Holdings ===
In May 2016, Soulja Boy signed a deal from World Poker Fund Holdings for five years. World Poker Fund is a builder and operator of online and event-based social gaming platforms and imprints. Soulja said of the deal: "I enjoy music, and of course gaming. Being an influencer is a form of currency." Way initially tweeted that the deal was for $400 million; however, that is the cap for the contract and not his payment from the company.

=== SouljaGame video game console ===
In December 2018, Soulja Boy released a video game console called the SouljaGame. It drew criticism for being an "overpriced" emulator of Nintendo and Sega handheld games, which were actually rebranded versions of existing consoles developed by Chinese company Anbernic. On December 15, 2018, he announced the release of two more consoles: the Retro SouljaBoy Mini, which resembles a Nintendo Game Boy, and the SouljaGame Fuze, which looks similar to Microsoft's Xbox One and Sony's PlayStation 4. As of December 30, 2018, Soulja Boy has pulled the SouljaGame consoles off his store amid threats of a lawsuit from Nintendo. On January 12, 2019, Soulja Boy released another handheld on his SouljaWatch website called the SouljaGame Handheld; this console looks similar in appearance to Sony's PlayStation Vita.

== Feuds ==
=== Ice-T ===
In June 2008, on DJ Cisco's Urban Legend mixtape, Ice-T told Way to "eat a dick" and criticized Way for "killing hip-hop" and his song "Crank That" for being "garbage" compared to the works of other hip-hop artists such as Rakim, Das EFX, Big Daddy Kane and Ice Cube. The two then traded videos back and forth over the Internet. Rapper Kanye West defended Way by arguing that he had created a new, original hip-hop work, thus keeping the authentic meaning of the music. The feud was parodied in a 2010 episode of The Boondocks.

In May 2011, Way's feud with Ice-T somewhat reignited over the film Juice. Way said he would release a movie of his own to go along with his mixtape of the same name, following a statement during Ice-T's interview with Shade 45 in late April 2011. Ice-T said that Way's role as Bishop, which was famously originated by rapper Tupac Shakur, was not an issue. But Ice-T found it problematic that the film was being remade, saying "What? But that's Pac ... At some point, somebody gotta stop it. I came out. I made some statements. Man, I don't know. Do you, dude, do you. If the masses accept it, it shows you the state we're in ... Come on man, you think I'd try to remake Pac's movie? Good luck though, I'm not a hater ... eh." Way barraged Ice-T with retaliatory tweets on the same day, saying someone should "get this guy a hairline."

=== Charles Hamilton ===
On December 9, 2008, Charles Hamilton said in an interview that Way was making it more difficult for new artists to be signed. Way responded, "X out the Sonic and fuck with Mario, you might want to got damn eat a mushroom" (Hamilton is a big fan of Sonic the Hedgehog, dedicating a whole mixtape depicting himself as the titular character). Hamilton responded with a diss song, "I'm You Last Year With Talent", followed by another, "Word Aight".

=== Bow Wow ===
On February 2, 2009, Way challenged Bow Wow to a race in their Lamborghinis and claimed Bow Wow's Lamborghini was a rental. On February 4, Bow Wow proved that he owned his Lamborghini. On February 7, both artists sent diss songs to each other, such as Way's "Fuck Bow Wow" and Bow Wow's "What I Think About You". Later that day during a phone conversation both rappers settled their differences. In 2016, they released a joint mixtape titled Ignorant Shit.

=== U.S. Armed Forces ===
In September 2011, Way released the song "Let's Be Real". One of the lines of the song is: "Fuck the FBI and fuck all the army troops / Fighting for what? Bitch, be your own man / I'll be flying through the clouds with green like I'm Peter Pan." After the song was released, Way was criticized by military members and their families, especially in regard to the timing in relation to the 10th anniversary of the 9/11 attacks. Way apologized, "When I expressed my frustration with the U.S. Army, not only did my words come out wrong, I was wrong to even speak them." He added, "So, I write this to give my sincerest apology to all members of the United States military services, as well as their families that were offended by my most recent lyrics." Representatives for Way indicated that the song had been pulled from his upcoming album, Promise, and would not be available for sale. They were also attempting to remove the video from the internet.

On September 6, 2011, TMZ reported that Way's album would not be sold at the 3,100 Army and Air Force base exchanges if it included the song "Let's Be Real".

=== Hopsin ===
On August 25, 2012, Way made controversial comments towards fellow rapper Hopsin on one of his webcam chats with his fans, when Way stated "fuck Hopsin, I'm about to go in the studio and record this Hopsin diss real quick". Way continued on by stating the words "that nigga's a bitch, fuck that bitch-ass nigga". The situation was caused by Hopsin's controversial song "Sag My Pants" which was a direct diss towards Way with the lines "Soulja Boy you got a corny flow, So you can suck my fucking dick through a glory hole" though Way previously didn't focus on the diss. On August 28, 2012, on Way's Tinychat, Hopsin and Way confronted each other: though Hopsin admitted he liked Way, nothing was really resolved. On September 3, 2012, Way released a Hopsin diss titled "That Nigga Not Me". Hopsin stated the song was horrible, but did not respond with a diss track of his own.

=== Chief Keef and Ballout ===
On April 19, 2013, Way sent a number of death threats to Chicago rapper Chief Keef via Facebook. The threats were likely provoked by an earlier incident, where Keef's affiliate Ballout stole Way's chain and bragged about it on Twitter. Way posted both Keef's cellphone numbers, urging people to notify him he's coming for him with a gun. He continued posting, stating he's in Keef's hometown of Chicago and asking Keef and Ballout to come to him. Chief Keef responded that he is currently in London but would talk to Way on his new number. Later the same day, Way issued a statement that his Facebook, Instagram and email were hacked and none of the earlier messages were written by him. On June 1, 2014, Way revealed on his Instagram that he and fellow artist Chief Keef had resolved their differences. Little is known as to whether Way has settled his differences with Ballout.

=== Chris Brown ===
On January 3, 2017, Way started a squabble with singer Chris Brown on social media. The feud started after Soulja Boy liked and commented a post on Brown's ex-girlfriend, model Karrueche Tran. Soulja Boy launched an attack on his social media accounts on Chris Brown after he claimed that the R&B crooner allegedly threatened him for liking a photo of Karrueche Tran: In a slew of videos targeting Brown, he attacked Brown for his parenting skills, taunted him for his 2009 assault on his then-girlfriend Rihanna and accused him of using cocaine. The rapper later issued an apology to Brown for igniting the beef. Brown responded issuing a challenge to settle the score in a televised boxing ring, with the profits going to charity. He requested that the two fight for three rounds, instead of going back and forth on social media. Brown also mocked Soulja Boy for stirring up an "imaginary beef" and later posted his phone number on Instagram. Soulja Boy recruited boxing veteran Floyd Mayweather as his trainer for the upcoming fight, while Chris Brown had Mike Tyson training him. In the meantime, Brown released for free a diss track to Soulja Boy called "500 Wayz", and Way responded with "Stop Playing with Me". Tran responded to the situation attacking Brown, the latter immediately fired back stating he is responsible for her success and the reason she has friends, some of whom he slept with. On February 21, 2017, Brown revealed in a video on his Instagram account that he chose to cancel the boxing match: "I bowed out of this Soulja Boy fight. I'mma tell you why, 'cause it was a legit thing on a positive scale. All the wrong people got in the way. The middlemen people got in the way. The homies, so to speak […] got in the way because they wanted a piece of the pie. It's immature, first and foremost. Second of all, ain't no n—a ever gon' hold me up. However everything goes, this how we rocking. He gon' see me."

In 2022, Brown revealed that he and Soulja Boy have no problems with each other.

=== Tyga ===
In early 2019, Soulja Boy drew attention for claiming he had the biggest comeback of 2018 over fellow rapper Tyga on the radio show The Breakfast Club, which started a series of exchanges between the two. The feud eventually resulted in the two trading diss tracks back and forth over the instrumental from Blueface's song, "Thotiana".

=== Jake Paul ===
In February 2019, YouTube celebrity Jake Paul published a tweet directed at Way, saying "i wanna box @souljaboy", to which Way responded, "boy I'll knock you out". The feud was started by Paul in reference to his participation as an undercard in the Logan Paul vs. KSI boxing fight. The two eventually confronted each other in person when Paul drove to Way's house to confirm they would have an official boxing match, which Paul had said he would bet $20 million on. Paul posted a video on YouTube the same day saying his status in the rematch between Logan Paul and KSI was undecided, leaving the status of the fight between him and Way in question.

=== Blueface ===
In December 2023 and January 2024, Way feuded with California rapper Blueface, after Blueface asserted on a podcast that he could win a hypothetical Verzuz freestyle battle against Way. During the feud, Way proposed that he and Blueface "meet up and die". Way announced the end of the feud on a January 20, 2024 Instagram Live stream, citing their mutual threats to harm each other in prison as proof that the situation escalated too far.

=== Metro Boomin ===
On May 12, 2024, Way sent condemnatory tweets directed at the American producer Metro Boomin in response to a ridiculing 2012 tweet, mocking his mother who died in a murder–suicide. After much public backlash, Way apologized and deleted the tweets three days later. Soon after the apology, he condemned fellow rappers 21 Savage and Meek Mill's support of Metro Boomin in the controversy.

== Personal life ==
=== Family ===
On the night of March 22, 2011, Way's younger brother, Deion Jenkins, was killed in a car crash. On September 30, 2022, Way's girlfriend Jackie gave birth to their first child, a son.

=== Domestic violence case ===
Recent court proceedings have led to significant legal and financial consequences for Way. Following a lawsuit filed by ex-girlfriend Kayla Myers, which alleged kidnapping and assault at his Malibu home in February 2019, a judge ordered in April that Soulja Boy pay $471,800, including punitive damages. The order, authorized the Los Angeles County Sheriff's Department to seize various personal items from his Bell Canyon home. This includes luxury vehicles like a yellow Bentley, a red Lamborghini, a yellow Mercedes-Benz, and other valuables such as a diamond-studded neck chain with his stage name, jewelry, and any cash found, often kept in backpacks. These developments are part of a pattern of allegations against the rapper; in 2021, model Nia Riley accused him of assault during their relationship, including an incident where she was allegedly kicked in the stomach while pregnant, leading to a miscarriage.

=== Robbery ===
On December 30, 2008, Way was robbed and battered in his home. Initial reports indicated that the robbers were six masked men with AK-47s and pistols; however, on December 31, 2008, videos surfaced on the Internet of two masked men claiming sole credit for the crime.

Way described the incident to MTV News a month later: he had come home very late at night after attending an album release party and was recording songs with friends when the robbers came in pointing their guns. On January 26, 2009, during another interview, Way said it was three robbers, not six: "I got back to my house at around 3 in the morning and I was in the studio recording. So two of my homeboys was in the living room and me and Arab we was in the studio recording. And somebody kicked in the door. One dude ran in put the AK to my homeboy head, put him on the floor [...] The other two ran in my homeboy jumped in the other room, so the other two dudes ran back so I peeped in the door and they running through my house with Ks and pistols so I ducked back. I really can't dwell on what happened after that, but it was a messed-up situation and I'm glad everyone made it out alive."

=== Possible presidential run ===
On October 10, 2026, Way expressed interest in running for president of the United States in 2028.

== Legal issues ==
On December 9, 2007, Way was sued by William Lyons (a.k.a. Souljah Boy of Mo Thugs Family), who created the stage name Souljah Boy in 1996.

On October 7, 2009, Way was arrested in Atlanta, Georgia, on one count of obstruction, a misdemeanor, for running from police when he'd been ordered to stop while filming a video in an abandoned house. The rapper was released on a $550 bond.

In May 2011, Way and his labels were sued by a local Pennsylvania promoter for failing to make promised payments in connection with a rescheduled concert. On October 18, 2011, Way was traveling west on I-20 in Carroll County, Georgia, with four other men when their vehicle was pulled over for a vehicle equipment violation. The police officer who made the stop searched the vehicle and found more than five ounces (140 g) of marijuana. Way was arrested and released on bond the same day.

On January 22, 2014, Way was a passenger in his vehicle when the driver ran a stop sign in the San Fernando Valley, California, and police discovered a loaded handgun in the car. Way was arrested immediately and taken to jail. His manager claimed that a neighbor had left the gun under the seat and that Way was unaware it was there. Way admitted to owning only the vehicle, not the weapon. He was convicted and sentenced to two years' probation. On February 15, 2014, Way announced on Twitter that he was going to jail in five days. He did not give a reason. He ultimately never turned himself in to authorities and the details of his charges are unknown.

In October 2016, Way was sued by the musician Skrill Dilly for allegedly making death threats to him in a video filmed by the rapper. The same year, he received additional probation time after police found weapons at his home. On March 15, 2019, Way was arrested for violating his probation, and on April 30, he was sentenced to 8 months in prison, with credit for time served.

In 2019, Way was sued by ex-girlfriend Kayla Myers for abuse and kidnapping. The victim stated that Way "approached yelling profanities, kicked her, stomped on her stomach and bashed her head with a large gun". In 2023, Way was ordered to pay the ex-girlfriend $471,800 in damages, and she was authorized to "seize and levy upon" some of his property such as cars and jewelry.

On January 21, 2021, Way was sued by an unnamed former personal assistant of his who alleged that he locked her in a room, physically and verbally abused her, and repeatedly raped her. Way denied the allegations, with a spokesperson saying: "Soulja would never put his hands on a female. He wouldn't beat a woman or put his hands on a woman … this is nonsense." On April 10, 2025, Way was found liable; he was ordered to pay a $4 million judgment to the plaintiff, but was also cleared of false imprisonment and constructive discharge.

On February 18, 2022, in a class-action lawsuit filed against the cryptocurrency company SafeMoon that alleged the company is a pump-and-dump scheme, Way was named as a defendant along with professional boxer Jake Paul, musician Nick Carter, rapper Lil Yachty, and social media personality Ben Phillips, for promoting the SafeMoon token on their social media accounts with misleading information. On the same day, the U.S. 11th Circuit Court of Appeals ruled in a lawsuit against Bitconnect that the Securities Act of 1933 extends to targeted solicitation using social media.

In November 2024, Rapper Plies sued Way, Megan Thee Stallion, and GloRilla over his song "Me & My Goons" for sampling it while the track was still infringed on Way's "Pretty Boy Swag."

On August 3, 2025, Way was arrested during a traffic stop in Los Angeles on a charge of being a convicted felon in possession of a firearm.

== Legacy ==
Way is known for having the first single to sell over three million digital copies, his debut single "Crank That (Soulja Boy)".

Way has garnered popularity through the use of social media. Since 2006, his YouTube channel has accumulated 1.9 billion views and more than 3.3 million subscribers. Way was one of the first rappers to capitalize on social media for marketing at the beginning of his career.

== Discography ==
Studio albums

- Souljaboytellem.com (2007)
- iSouljaBoyTellem (2008)
- The DeAndre Way (2010)
- King Soulja 3 (2014)
- Loyalty (2015)
- Best to Ever Do It (2018)
- Young Draco (2018)
- Big Draco (2021)
- Big Draco 2 (2021)
- Big Draco 3 (2022)
- Swag 7 (2025)

== Tours ==
- America's Most Wanted Tour (2009)

== Filmography ==
=== Film ===
Year	Film	Role	Notes
2007	YouTube Live	Himself	Small role
2008	What's at Stake?	Himself	Small role
2009	School Gyrls	Himself	Cameo
2010	Malice N Wonderland	Soulja	Small role
2011	Soulja Boy: The Movie	Himself	Documentary on his life
2013	Officer Down	Rudy	Supporting role

=== Television ===
Year	Title	Role	Notes
2007	The Ellen DeGeneres Show	Himself	
2007	Last Call with Carson Daly	Himself	
2008	Live with Regis	Himself	Minor appearance
2008	Access Granted	Himself	For his music video for "Bird Walk"
2008	My Super Sweet 16	Himself	
2009	The Game	Ray Ray	Episode: "I Want It All and I Want It Now"
2010	When I Was 17	Himself	
2010	The Mo'Nique Show	Himself	
2010	Late Night with Jimmy Fallon	Himself	
2010	Lopez Tonight	Himself	
2010	The Tonight Show with Jay Leno	Himself	
2012	The DUB Magazine Project	Himself	
2013	The Bachelorette (season 9)	Himself	
2014–2016	Love & Hip Hop: Hollywood	Himself	Main role (seasons 1–2); Main/guest role (season 3)
2022	Atlanta	Himself	Episode: "Crank Dat Killer"

== Awards and nominations ==
- BET Awards
  - 2007: Best New Artist (Nominated)
  - 2008: Viewer's Choice Award: "Crank That (Soulja Boy)" (Nominated)
  - 2009: Viewer's Choice Award: "Kiss Me Thru the Phone" (Nominated)
- BET Hip-Hop Awards
  - 2007: Best Hip-Hop Dance (Won)
- BET Social Awards
  - 2019: Social Verified Award (Won)
- Grammy Awards
  - 2008: Best Rap Song: "Crank That (Soulja Boy)" (Nominated)
- Ozone Awards
  - 2007: Patiently Waiting: Mississippi (Won)
  - 2008: Best Breakthrough Artist (Nominated)
  - 2008: TJ's DJ's Tastemaker Award (Nominated)
- Nickelodeon Kids' Choice Awards
  - 2007: Favorite Male Singer (Nominated)
- Teen Choice Awards
  - 2009: Choice Music: Rap Artist (Nominated)
  - 2009: Choice Music: R&B Track for "Kiss Me Thru the Phone" (Nominated)
  - 2009: Choice Music: Hook Up for "Kiss Me Thru the Phone" (Nominated)
  - 2009: Choice Music: Artist (Nominated)

== See also ==
- List of artists who reached number one in the United States
