= Rasheeda discography =

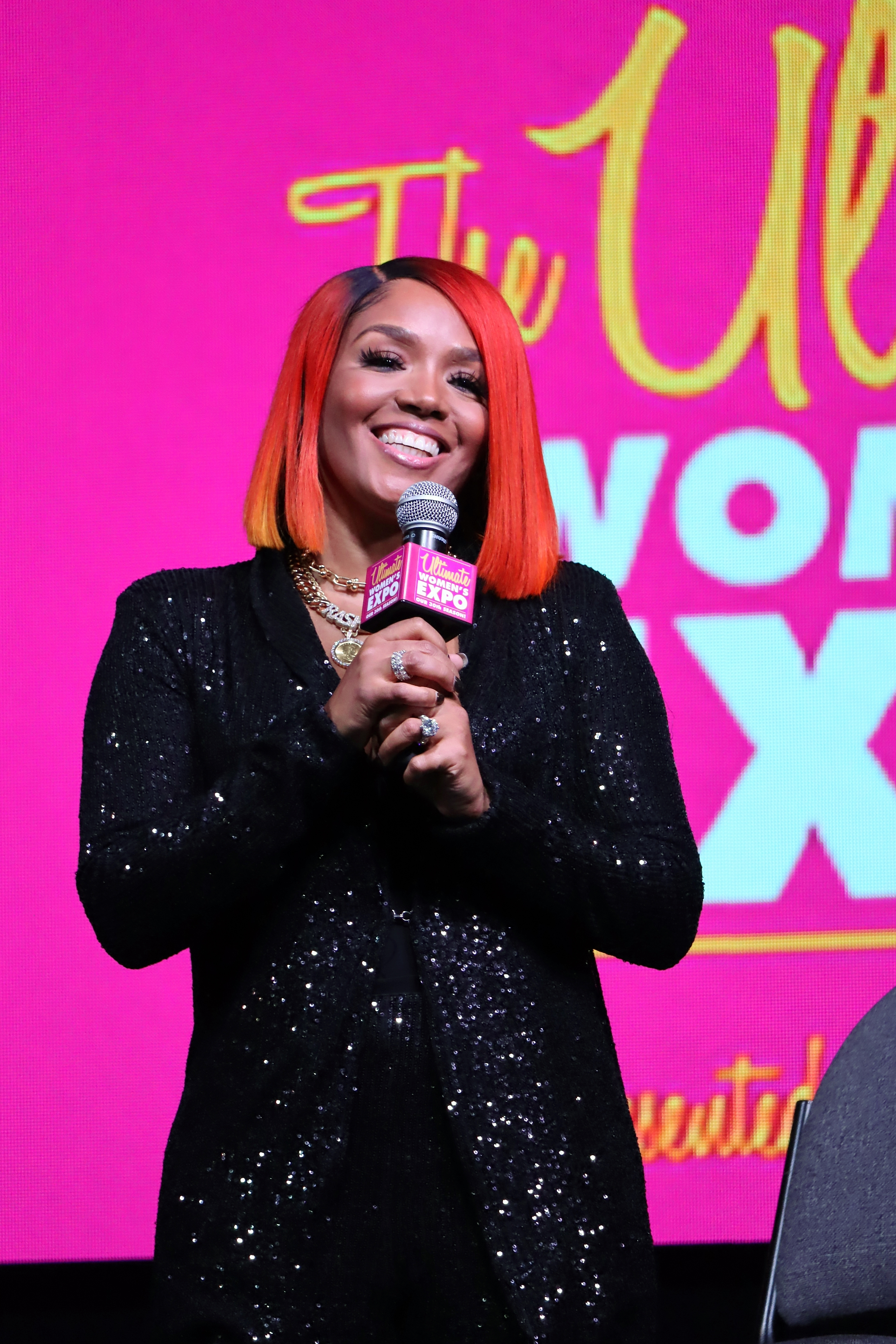
- Rasheeda at the Houston Women Expo in 2022
- Studio albums: 6
- Extended plays: 1
- Compilation albums: 1
- Singles: 11
- Music videos: 6
- Mixtapes: 7
- Guest appearances: 3

This is the discography of American rapper Rasheeda.

== Albums ==
=== Studio albums ===
List of albums, with selected chart positions
Title	Album details	Peak chart positions
Title	Album details	US R&B/HH
Dirty South	Released: March 27, 2001; Label: D-Lo, Motown; Format: CD, digital download, LP	77
A Ghetto Dream	Released: March 19, 2002; Label: D-Lo Entertainment; Format: CD, digital download	—
GA Peach	Released: April 25, 2006; Label: D-Lo, Big Cat Records/Tommy Boy Entertainment; Format: CD, digital download, LP	81
Dat Type of Gurl	Released: June 19, 2007; Label: D-Lo, Big Cat Records/Tommy Boy entertainment; Format: CD, digital download, LP	80
Certified Hot Chick	Released: August 18, 2009; Label: D-Lo, Tommy Boy entertainment; Format: CD, digital download, LP	—
Boss Chick Music	Released: June 18, 2012; Label: D-Lo Entertainment; Format: Digital download, LP	—
"—" denotes items that did not chart or were not released.

=== Compilation albums ===
Title	Details
The Best of Rasheeda	Released: January 14, 2011; Label: D-Lo Entertainment; Formats: Digital download

=== Mixtapes ===
Rasheeda's mixtapes and details
Title	Mixtape details
Certified	Released: July 28, 2009; Hosted by DJ Ames
Terrestrial B%$C#	Released: 2009
Ground Breaker	Released: 2009
Boss Bitch Music	Released: March 17, 2010; Hosted by D-Lo
Boss Bitch Music Vol. 2	Released: September 27, 2010; Hosted by D-Lo
Boss Bitch Music Vol. 3	Released: April 14, 2011
Boss Bitch Music Vol. 4	Released: January 31, 2012; Hosted by DJ A-One

== Extended plays ==
Title	Details
Certified Hot Chick EP	Released: November 18, 2008; Label: D-Lo Entertainment; Format: digital download, EP

== Singles ==
=== As a lead artist ===
Year	Title	Chart positions	Album
Year	Title	US R&B/HH	Album
2000	"Do It" (featuring Pastor Troy, Quebo Gold and Re Re)	83	Dirty South
2001	"Get It On" (featuring Slim)	—	Dirty South
2001	"Off da Chain" (featuring Jazze Pha)	—	Dirty South
2006	"Georgia Peach"	89	GA Peach
2006	"Touch Ya Toes"	—	GA Peach
2006	"My Bubble Gum"	53	GA Peach
2009	"Boss Chick"	125	Certified Hot Chick
2010	"Let It Go"	—	Certified Hot Chick
2012	"Marry Me"	—	Boss Chick Music
2012	"Don't Let Him Get Away" (featuring Cherish)	—	Boss Chick Music
2013	"Legs to the Moon" (featuring Kandi)	—	Boss Chick Music
"—" denotes releases that did not chart

=== As featured performer ===
Year	Title	Chart positions		Album
Year	Title	US	US R&B/HH	Album
2004	"Vibrate" (Petey Pablo featuring Rasheeda)	—	86	Still Writing in My Diary: 2nd Entry
2004	"You Like It Like That" (Nivea featuring Rasheeda)	—	86	Non-album single
2007	"Like This" (Mims featuring Rasheeda)	32	54	Music Is My Savior
2010	"Independent Bitches (Remix)" (Candi Redd ft Rasheeda & Kandi Girl)	—	—	Code Redd
