= Petey Pablo discography =

- Studio albums: 2
- Singles: 7

This is the discography of rapper Petey Pablo.

== Albums ==
=== Studio albums ===
Year	Album	Peak chart positions		Certifications
Year	Album	US	US R&B	Certifications
2001	Diary of a Sinner: 1st Entry: Released: November 6, 2001; Label: Jive; Format: CD, cassette, digital download	13	7	RIAA: Gold
2004	Still Writing in My Diary: 2nd Entry: Released: May 4, 2004; Label: Jive; Formats: CD, cassette, digital download	4	3	RIAA: Gold

=== Mixtapes ===
- 2012: Carolina #1
- 2014: Carolina Bound

== Singles ==
=== As lead artist ===
List of singles, with selected chart positions and certifications, showing year released and album name
Title	Year	Peak chart positions					Certifications	Album
Title	Year	US	US R&B/HH	US Rap	AUS	UK	Certifications	Album
"Raise Up"	2001	25	9	1	—	—		Diary of a Sinner: 1st Entry
"I Told Y'all"	2001	94	55	—	—	—		Diary of a Sinner: 1st Entry
"I"	2002	—	62	—	—	51		Diary of a Sinner: 1st Entry
"Club Banger"	2002	—	98	—	—	—		Drumline OST
"Freek-a-Leek"	2003	7	5	2	63	—	RIAA: Platinum	Still Writing in My Diary: 2nd Entry
"Vibrate" (featuring Rasheeda)	2004	—	86	—	—	113		Still Writing in My Diary: 2nd Entry
"Show Me the Money"	2006	58	—	—	— (Note: "Show Me the Money" did not enter the ARIA Singles Chart, but peaked at number 49 on the ARIA Digital Track Chart.)	—		Step Up (Original Soundtrack)
"Get Low" (featuring Wizz Dumb)	2011	—	—	—	—	—		Carolina #1
"—" denotes a title that did not chart, or was not released in that territory.

=== As featured artist ===
Year	Song	Peak chart positions				Certifications	Album
Year	Song	US	US R&B/HH	AUS	UK	Certifications	Album
2002	"Rep Yo City" (E-40 featuring Petey Pablo, Bun B, 8Ball, and Lil Jon & the East Side Boyz)	—	73	—	—		Grit & Grind and Kings of Crunk
2004	"Goodies" (Ciara featuring Petey Pablo)	1	1	19	1	RIAA: 4× Platinum; BPI: Silver; RMNZ: Platinum	Goodies
2004	"We Like Them Girls" (Silkk the Shocker featuring Petey Pablo and Master P)	—	69	—	—		Based on a True Story
2005	"Get XXX'd" (J-Kwon featuring Petey Pablo and Ebony Eyez)	—	95	—	—		xXx: State of the Union OST
2020	"Pacemaker" (Natalia Damini featuring Petey Pablo)	—	—	—	—		Pacemaker

== Other charted songs ==
Title	Year	Peak chart positions				Album
Title	Year	US	US R&B/HH	US Rap	CAN	Album
"Old Dog" (with J. Cole)	2026	64	22	19	94	The Fall-Off

== Guest appearances ==
List of non-single guest appearances, with other performing artists, showing year released and album name
Title	Year	Other performer(s)	Album
"Come See About Me"	2000	Mystikal, Da Brat	Let's Get Ready
"O.K."	2000	Torrey Carter, Trick Daddy, Missy Elliott	The Life I Live
"Lights, Camera, Action! (Remix)"	2001	Mr. Cheeks, P. Diddy, Missy Elliott	Non-album single
"Problems"	2001	Mil	Street Scriptures
"Ghetto"	2001	Sticky Fingaz	Blacktrash: The Autobiography of Kirk Jones
"Didn't I"	2001		The Fast and the Furious (soundtrack)
"Serious"	2001	Timbaland & Magoo	Indecent Proposal
"Roll Out"	2001	Timbaland & Magoo, Sebastian	Indecent Proposal
"Love Me"	2001	Timbaland & Magoo, Tweet	Indecent Proposal
"Baby Bubba"	2001	Timbaland & Magoo	Indecent Proposal
"Mr. Richards"	2001	Timbaland & Magoo	Indecent Proposal
"Fight Club"	2001	Fat Joe, M.O.P.	Jealous Ones Still Envy (J.O.S.E.)
"Let's Stay Home Tonight" (Remix)	2001	Joe	Better Days
"Dirrty"	2001	Drag-On	Ryde or Die Vol. 3: In the "R" We Trust
"Que La Cosa"	2002		Undisputed (soundtrack)
"Gangsta Shit"	2002	Lil Wayne	500 Degreez
"Waitin On"	2002	Angie Martinez	Animal House
"Call It Gangster"	2002	Too Short, Dolla Will	What's My Favorite Word?
"Keeps Spinnin"	2002	Birdman, T.I., TQ, Mannie Fresh, Stone, Wolf, Bizzy, Gilly, Mikkey E	Birdman
"Rock the Party" (Young Heff Remix)	2003	Benzino, Lil' Kim, Mario Winans	Redemption
"Yes Sir"	2003	DJ Envy, Juvenile, Coke	The Desert Storm Mixtape: Blok Party, Vol. 1
"You Can't Fuck with Us"	2003	Too Short, N.O.R.E.	Married to the Game
"Put Yo Hood Up" (Remix)	2003	Lil Jon & the East Side Boyz, Jadakiss, Chyna Whyte, Roy Jones Jr.	Part II
"I'll Take You There"	2003	Big Tymers, Joi	Big Money Heavyweight
"Great Moments in the Ghetto"		Mannie Fresh	The Mind of Mannie Fresh
"Keep It Moving"	2004	Body Head Bangerz, Fiend	Body Head Bangerz: Volume One
"Anything U Want"	2005	Renegade Foxxx, YoungBloodZ	Still Hustlin
"Set It Off"	2005	Enemigo, Luny Tunes	Caminando
"Where Da Bypass At? (Interlude)"	2005	Black Rob, D-Dot, Craig Mack	The Black Rob Report
"The Otherside"	2006	Bubba Sparxxx, Sleepy Brown	The Charm
"Pimp Hard"	2006	Scarface, Juvenile, Z-Ro	My Homies Part 2
"Holla at Cha Homeboy"	2006	Uncle Luke, Pitbull	My Life & Freaky Times
"Naughty"	2007	Kev Samples	The Rush
"The Struggle"	2008	Bone Brothers, Krayzie Bone & Wish Bone	Bone Brothers 3
"You Can Get It"	2009	Sisqó	—N/a
"Drop Rap"	2010	Chris Brown	In My Zone 2
"Swear to God"	2010	EDIDON, Young Noble, K. Kastro of Outlawz	The Stash Spot
"Redbone"	2013	Timbaland, Sebastian	—N/a
"Snitch Bitch"	2015	Terrence Howard	Empire: Original Soundtrack Season 2 Volume 1
"King"	2015	Prof	Liability
