= Dogg After Dark =

- Genre: Variety show
- Starring: Snoop Dogg
- Country of origin: United States
- No. of seasons: 1
- No. of episodes: 7

Production
- Executive producers: Adam Freeman; Constance Schwartz; Karen Frank; Leslie Greif; Matt Parillo; Snoop Dogg; Ted Chung; Tim Healy; Tony DiBari
- Production companies: Boutique Television; Snoopadelic Pictures

Original release
- Network: MTV
- Release: February 17 – March 31, 2009

Related
- Doggy Fizzle Televizzle; Snoop Dogg's Father Hood

Dogg After Dark is an American variety show starring rapper Snoop Dogg on MTV. The series debuted on February 17, 2009, and features celebrity interviews, sketch-comedy segments and musical performances by Snoop's own in-house band, the "Snoopadelics." Dogg After Dark takes place on location at Kress, a Los Angeles club on Hollywood Boulevard.

== Episodes ==
No.	Title	Original release date
1	"Episode 1"	February 17, 2009
Guest appearances by Paris Hilton, Katt Williams, Fred Williamson and guest performances by Pharrell Williams and Kid Cudi.
2	"Episode 2"	February 24, 2009
Guest appearances by Ciara and Nick Cannon and guest performances by Bobby Valentino.
3	"Episode 3"	March 3, 2009
Guest appearances by Mike Epps, Fall Out Boy and Ice Cube and guest performances by Ice Cube and Fall Out Boy.
4	"Episode 4"	March 10, 2009
Guest appearances by Soulja Boy, Meagan Good, Twista, B-Real, Adam Jones, DeSean Jackson, Priest Holmes, MIMS and The-Dream and guest performance by The-Dream.
5	"Episode 5"	March 17, 2009
Guest appearances by Busta Rhymes, Ryan Sheckler, Lil' Mama, Uncle Junebug and Keri Hilson and guest performances by Keri Hilson & Busta Rhymes.
6	"Episode 6"	March 24, 2009
Guests appearances by Donald Faison, Benny Boom, Wood Harris, Esther Baxter, Limp Bizkit, DeRay Davis and Chester French.
7	"Episode 7"	March 31, 2009
Guest appearances by Eddie Griffin and Day26. Guest performance by Nas.
