= By Choice or by Force =

By Choice Or By Force

Studio album by Pastor Troy
- Released: July 25, 2006
- Studio: Upstairs Studio (Atlanta, GA); Chop Shop (Brooklyn, NY)
- Genre: Hip-hop
- Length: 49:20
- Label: Money And Power; Fastlife; Koch
- Producer: Cooley C; DJ Squeeky; Drumma Boy; Pastor Troy; P No; Terrence Cash

Pastor Troy chronology
Stay Tru (2006)	By Choice Or By Force (2006)	Tool Muziq (2007)

Professional ratings
Review scores
Source	Rating
AllHipHop	3/5 stars
AllMusic	3.5/5 stars
RapReviews	4.5/10

By Choice Or By Force is the tenth solo studio album by American rapper Pastor Troy. It was released on July 25, 2006 via Koch Records. Recording sessions took place at Upstairs Studio in Atlanta and Chop Shop in Brooklyn. Production was handled by DJ Squeeky, P No, Cooley C, Drumma Boy, Terrence Cash, and Pastor Troy himself, who also served as executive producer together with Bob Perry. It features guest appearances from Bootleg, Criminal Manne, Kira, Misha, Mr. Mudd and Rasheeda. In the United States, the album debuted at number 130 on the Billboard 200, number 13 on the Top R&B/Hip-Hop Albums and number 9 on the Independent Albums charts.

== Track listing ==
No.	Title	Length
1.	"Murda Man 2"	3:50
2.	"I Represent This (Can I Get a Witness)"	3:49
3.	"I'm the Shark in the Water"	3:06
4.	"Crossroads"	4:03
5.	"Who Do I Trust"	4:07
6.	"Pop a Few Bottles" (featuring Rasheeda)	4:12
7.	"I Like All That"	3:12
8.	"Drop That Ass"	3:47
9.	"Vegas"	4:29
10.	"Down for Life" (featuring Kira)	3:23
11.	"Partner in Crime" (featuring Misha)	4:04
12.	"On the Block" (featuring Criminal Manne and Mr Mud)	3:58
13.	"Twenty Six" (featuring Bootleg)	3:20
Total length:		49:20

== Personnel ==
- Micah LeVar "Pastor" Troy — main artist, producer, executive producer
- Rasheeda Buckner-Frost — featured artist (track 6)
- Kira — featured artist (track 10)
- Misha — featured artist (track 11)
- Vanda "Criminal Manne" Watkins — featured artist (track 12)
- Mr. Mudd — featured artist (track 12)
- Bootleg — featured artist (track 13)
- DJ Squeeky — producer
- P No — producer
- Cooley C — producer
- Drumma Boy — producer
- Terrence Cash — producer, recording, mixing
- Arnold Mischkulnig — recording, mixing, mastering
- Bob Perry — executive producer

== Charts ==
Chart (2006)	Peak position
US Billboard 200	130
US Top R&B/Hip-Hop Albums (Billboard)	13
US Independent Albums (Billboard)	9
