= Freek-a-Leek =

2003 single by Petey Pablo

Single by Petey Pablo

from the album Still Writing in My Diary: 2nd Entry
- Released: December 1, 2003
- Genre: Southern hip-hop
- Length: 3:55
- Label: Jive
- Songwriters: Moses Barrett; Jonathan Smith; LaMarquis Jefferson; Craig Love; Corey Evans
- Producer: Lil Jon

Petey Pablo singles chronology
"Club Banger" (2003)	"Freek-a-Leek" (2003)	"Vibrate" (2004)

"Freek-a-Leek" is a song by American rapper Petey Pablo. It was released on December 1, 2003, as the second single from his second album, Still Writing in My Diary: 2nd Entry (2004). The song was produced by Lil Jon and peaked at number seven on the US Billboard Hot 100 in July 2004. In 2019, American rapper Saweetie sampled the beat of "Freek-a-Leek" in her song "My Type" from her EP Icy.

== Background and recording ==
In 2000, following an appearance on the remix of the song "Whoa!" by Black Rob, Pablo caught the attention of producer Timbaland, as well as the A&R manager of Jive Records, who helped Pablo acquire a deal with the record label. Pablo's first single, "Raise Up", was an instant commercial success, reaching the top 25 on the US Billboard Hot 100 and receiving heavy airplay on MTV. Diary of a Sinner: 1st Entry, his debut studio album, was released later in the year and initially sold well due to the success of "Raise Up"; however, the follow-up singles "I Told Y'all" and "I" failed to have any major impact on the charts. Consequently, Pablo's material received very little promotion from Jive over the next few years and the release of his second album Still Writing in My Diary: 2nd Entry, originally set for 2002, was postponed indefinitely; it was not released until 2004.

Despite these delays, Pablo continued to record material for the album, eventually completing it during 2003. He recorded "Freek-a-Leek" following studio sessions with rapper Lil Jon, whose popularity had increased following his work with hip-hop duo Ying Yang Twins. Before Lil Jon began work with Pablo, at the request of Jive he had made fifteen productions for rapper Mystikal, who also recorded for the label, although he passed most of them on. One of these, the production that would eventually become "Freek-a-Leek", was given to Pablo by Jive without Lil Jon's knowledge, after which he recorded the song. Meanwhile, thinking that the beat had not been used, Lil Jon gave the production to singer Usher for his song "Yeah!", from which a rough version of the song was recorded, mixed, and mastered. Although Lil Jon eventually realized the mistake after Pablo played him "Freek-a-Leek" during one of their studio sessions, Pablo was unwilling to give up the song, especially as it was already receiving airplay on Southern hip-hop radio. As a result, Lil Jon created an entirely new instrumental for "Yeah!", and Jive solicited "Freek-a-Leek" as the first single from Still Writing in My Diary: 2nd Entry on December 16, 2003, through release as a vinyl single.

== Composition and lyrics ==
A Southern hip-hop song of three minutes and fifty-five seconds in length, "Freek-a-Leek" is backed by an instrumentation which features a "slowly strolling riff", as well as following a tempo described as "heavy-synthed marching band-inspired". It begins and ends with a fake radio show, with Pablo acting as an impromptu host as well as introducing the song. Pablo's vocals are built around a "Novation synth" based melody, with a flute becoming audible during the chorus as well as a set of "cleverly layered vocal chants".

The lyrics of "Freek-a-Leek" were noted for their heavily sexually explicit nature; according to David Jeffries of AllMusic, "Pablo rattles off the names of different drugs and sexual positions as if he was checking off his grocery list but the straight-up hood production of the song meant it was under the radar the usual decency watchdogs."

== Remix ==
The remix features Jermaine Dupri and Twista. The song appears on Twista's album Kamikaze.

== Music video ==
The music video was directed by Erik White and features actress Esther Baxter. The opening scene is based on the film Belly.

== Charts ==
=== Weekly charts ===
Chart (2004)	Peak position
Australia (ARIA)	63
Australian Urban (ARIA)	18
Canada CHR/Pop Top 30 (Radio & Records)	13
Netherlands (Single Top 100)	93
US Billboard Hot 100	7
US Hot R&B/Hip-Hop Songs (Billboard)	5
US Hot Rap Songs (Billboard)	2
US Pop Airplay (Billboard)	17
US Rhythmic Airplay (Billboard)	2

=== Year-end charts ===
Chart (2004)	Position
US Billboard Hot 100	14
US Hot R&B/Hip-Hop Singles & Tracks (Billboard)	16
US Hot Rap Tracks (Billboard)	2
US Mainstream Top 40 (Billboard)	62
US Rhythmic Top 40 (Billboard)	3

== Certifications ==
Region	Certification	Certified units/sales
United States (RIAA)	Gold	500,000^{*}
United States (RIAA) Mastertone	Platinum	1,000,000^{*}
^{*} Sales figures based on certification alone.
