= Guilt (album) =

Studio album by Mims
- Released: April 7, 2009
- Recorded: 2008–2009
- Genre: Hip hop, East Coast hip hop, rap rock
- Length: 48:11
- Label: Capitol, EMI
- Producer: Blackout Movement, Jim Jonsin, The Runners, J.U.S.T.I.C.E. League, The Kaliphat, Marco Bosco, Da Internz

Mims chronology
Music Is My Savior (2007)	Guilt (2009)

Singles from Guilt
- 1. "Move (If You Wanna)" Released: October 22, 2008; 2. "Love Rollercoaster" Released: April 7, 2009

Guilt is the second studio album from Washington Heights, Manhattan rapper, Mims. The album was released on April 7, 2009. Guilt garnered a mixed reception from critics, debuted at number 53 on the Billboard 200 and spawned two singles: "Move (If You Wanna)" and "Love Rollercoaster". The album sold 12,500 copies in the first week.

== Singles ==
The first single for the album is "Move (If You Wanna)". Later, a video was shot for the single as a promotion for the album, revealing its title to be Guilt, and premiered February 14, 2009.

Mims has stated that his song "Donkie Booty" featuring Trey Songz will not be on the album because it was leaked. Many other songs too leaked on Internet but it is not confirmed whether they were recorded for the album.

The song "Rock 'N Rollin'", produced by Jim Jonsin and featuring rapper Tech N9ne, sees the two rappers incorporate the names of several notable rock bands into their lyrics. Jake Paine of HipHopDX made a comparison, based on the concept, to GZA's "Labels", which incorporated hip hop imprints into its lyrics in a similar fashion.

The track "Love Rollercoaster" is also featured on Letoya Luckett's second album, Lady Love.

== Critical reception ==
Professional ratings
Aggregate scores
Source	Rating
Metacritic	(49/100)
Review scores
Source	Rating
AllMusic	2/5 stars
DJBooth	3/5 stars
Entertainment Weekly	B
HipHopDX	2.5/5 stars
The New York Times	(mixed)
NOW	2/5 Ns
RapReviews	(6.5/10)
Rolling Stone	2/5 stars
The Smoking Section	2.5/5 stars
Vibe	2/5 stars

Guilt received generally mixed reviews from music critics. At Metacritic, which assigns a normalized rating out of 100 to reviews from mainstream critics, the album received an average score of 49, based on 7 reviews.

Rolling Stone editor Jody Rosen commented about the record: "Mims has good taste in beats. But this album seems just... superfluous. As for the single "Move (If You Wanna)": not "Hot." AllMusic's David Jeffries found the highlights to be "empty-headed club tracks" that aren't prevalent throughout the track listing, concluding that "While Guilt may be a bad title for a pop-rap album so slick and shallow, the completely ludicrous I Am Hip Hop's Savior was the original plan, suggesting that this project was misguided since early development." Andrew Rennie of NOW noted how throughout the album, Mims borrows styles from fellow contemporaries like Busta Rhymes and Kanye West. Rennie later added that "[T]here are a couple of moments of idiosyncrasy here, particularly on the title track and "On & On", but Guilt's formulaic approach makes it easy to pass on the whole album. Instead, head over to your favourite download site and cherry-pick the radio bangers."

Margeaux Watson of Entertainment Weekly simply said in her review, "The rapper behind 2007’s party anthem 'This Is Why I’m Hot' returns with more heat for the dance floor." Steve 'Flash' Juon of RapReviews said that despite the two singles and the rest of the tracks showing variety in tone and style, he felt that either Mims "or his record label may have overestimated how interested people would be in his sound after a two year layoff." He concluded that "Any number of things might have changed the outlook here - more big name guests, more outside producers, better marketing or even making "Love Rollercoaster" the lead single instead of the followup. Whatever the answer, people in 2009 will be left asking the question why he's NOT as opposed to why he's HOT." Writing for The New York Times, Jon Caramanica gave credit to Mims' "ear for clever production" and self-awareness of his limited appeal but found his lyrical skills lacking and said that 'Move (If You Wanna)' "has made him a one-hit wonder two times over. It’s an unfortunate identity, but an identity all the same."

== Commercial performance ==
The album debuted at number 53 on the Billboard 200, selling 12,400 copies in its first week.

== Track listing ==
No.	Title	Length
1.	"Guilt"	2:31
2.	"The Skit"	1:27
3.	"On & On"	3:15
4.	"Love Rollercoaster" (featuring LeToya Luckett)	3:55
5.	"Move (If You Wanna)"	3:10
6.	"One Day" (featuring Ky-Mani Marley)	3:45
7.	"Chasing Sunshine" (featuring KVN)	3:14
8.	"Rock 'N Rollin'" (featuring Tech N9ne)	3:56
9.	"Be My Hustla" (featuring J. Holiday)	3:46
10.	"Makin' Money"	4:01
11.	"In My Life (Why Oh Why)"	3:49
12.	"One Last Kiss" (featuring Soler Mesh)	4:09
13.	"Heal Me (Outro)" (featuring Soler Mesh)	2:59
14.	"I Do" (featuring Nice & Smooth)	4:14
