= Universal Soldier (Pastor Troy album) =

Studio album by Pastor Troy
- Released: September 24, 2002
- Recorded: 2002
- Studio: Madd House Studios; The Village Recorder (Los Angeles, California); PatchWerk Recording Studios (Atlanta, Georgia); Sound Lab (Atlanta, Georgia); Audio Vision Studios (Miami, Florida); Flamingo Studios (Atlanta, Georgia); Off The Top Studios; 1210 Studios (Atlanta, Georgia)
- Genre: Southern hip hop; crunk; hardcore hip hop
- Length: 1:10:16
- Label: Universal Records
- Producer: Dino Delvaille (exec.); Benny "DaDa" Tillman; Big Floaty; Carlos "Los Vagez" Thornton; Church Boi; Jazze Pha; Lil Jon; Pastor Troy; Timbaland; Tony "T-Cap" Sims; Carl Mo

Pastor Troy chronology
Hell 2 Pay (2002)	Universal Soldier (2002)	By Any Means Necessary (2004)

Universal Soldier is the sixth solo studio album by American rapper Pastor Troy. It was released in 2002 through Universal Records. Recording sessions took place at Madd House Studios, at the Village Recorder. at PatchWerk Recording Studios, at Sound Lab, at Audio Vision Studios, at Flamingo Studios, at Off The Top Studios, and at 1210 Studios. Production was handled by Lil Jon, Timbaland, Tony "T-Cap" Sims, Jazze Pha, Benny "DaDa" Tillman, Big Floaty, Carlos "Los Vagez" Thornton, Church Boi, Carl Mo, and Pastor Troy himself, with Dino Delvaille serving as executive producer. It features guest appearances from Bun B, Ms. Jade, Pastor Troy Sr., Timbaland, and fellow D.S.G.B. members. The album peaked at number 13 on the Billboard 200 and number 2 on the Top R&B/Hip-Hop Albums in the United States.

== Composition ==
Troy told Billboard that, in contrast to his previous albums, which drew a Dirty South fanbase, Universal Soldier "covers more ground". AllMusic critic Bradley Torreano viewed the album as Troy's second album to aim for a mainstream breakthrough, following Face Off (2001). The album features work from several high-profile producers, including Timbaland and Jazze Pha, who each produce two tracks, and Lil Jon, who produces three. "When He Comes" features Troy's father, a pastor.

The songs cover topics including thug life, Christianity, sexuality, marijuana, and terrorism. Torreano wrote that Troy "tries to come off as a pious voice of reason" on most of the album's songs, extensively discussing his religious beliefs. On "Bless America", Troy quotes "Real American" by Rick Derringer, a tribute to American wrestler Hulk Hogan, while discussing the effects of terrorism on victims' families and American society. "Who, What, When, Where", produced by Lil Jon, is a tribute to Troy's Georgia pride. "Are We Cuttin'", produced by Timbaland, is a club anthem. "No Mo Play in GA Pt. 2." addresses Troy's feud with Master P.

== Singles ==
The album's lead single, "Are We Cuttin'", featured Ms. Jade and CJ, both protégés of Timbaland. It also served as the first single from the soundtrack to Rob Cohen's film xXx.

== Critical reception ==
Professional ratings
Review scores
Source	Rating
AllMusic	3/5 stars
HipHopDX	3.5/5
RapReviews	5/10

In his review for AllMusic, Torreano argued the album lacks direction, criticizing the production and opining that Troy contracts himself by discussing his Christian faith while also discussing violence, sex, and drug use. However, Torreano praised "Are We Cuttin'," "Bless America", and "Who, What, When, Where", concluding that Universal Soldier is "another average record from a rapper who shows so much potential". RapReviews critic Steve Juon praised the production but deemed his songwriting simplistic, and likewise felt it was ironic for Troy to rap about religion while rapping "about more violence and mayhem than most of his No Limit rivals put together".

== Track listing ==
No.	Title	Producer(s)	Length
1.	"Intro"	Pastor Troy	2:20
2.	"Universal Soldier"	Pastor Troy	3:32
3.	"Are We Cuttin'" (featuring Ms. Jade)	Timbaland	4:56
4.	"If I Wasn't Rappin" (featuring Bun B)	Tony "T-Cap" Sims	3:59
5.	"Who, What, When, Where"	Lil Jon	5:10
6.	"Tell 'Em It's On" (featuring Timbaland)	Timbaland	4:37
7.	"4 My Hustlaz"	Lil Jon	4:28
8.	"Chug-a-Lug"	Benny "DaDa" Tillman; Carlos "Los Vagez" Thornton	4:34
9.	"You Can't Pimp Me" (featuring Peter the Disciple)	Jazze Pha	4:20
10.	"I'm a Raise Me a Soldier"	Big Floaty	4:54
11.	"Undefeated" (featuring Black Out and Pin Head)	Jazze Pha	4:11
12.	"No Mo Play in G.A., Pt. 2"	Church Boi	4:20
13.	"If They Kill Me"	Lil Jon	4:22
14.	"When He Comes" (featuring Pastor Troy Sr.)	Tony "T-Cap" Sims	5:19
15.	"Bless America"	Pastor Troy	4:23
16.	"Outro"	Pastor Troy	0:25
17.	"Vica Versa (Remix)" (featuring Peter the Disciple)	Carl Mo	4:26
Total length:			1:10:16

== Personnel ==
- Micah Troy – main artist, producer (tracks: 1, 2, 15, 16)
- Chevon Young – featured artist (track 3)
- Bernard Freeman – featured artist (track 4)
- Timothy Mosley – featured artist (track 6), producer (tracks: 3, 6)
- Lil Pete – featured artist (tracks: 9, 17)
- Black Out – featured artist (track 11)
- Pin Head – featured artist (track 11)
- Pastor Troy Sr. – featured artist (track 14)
- Tony "T-Cap" Sims – producer (tracks: 4, 14)
- Jonathan Smith – producer (tracks: 5, 7, 13)
- Benny "DaDa" Tillman – producer (track 8)
- Carlos "Los Vagez" Thornton – producer (track 8)
- Phalon Alexander – producer (tracks: 9, 11)
- Kevin "Big Floaty" Burton – producer (track 10)
- Church Boi – producer (track 12)
- Carlton Mahone Jr. – producer (track 17)
- Dino Delvaille – executive producer, A&R direction
- Sandy Brummels – art direction
- Jonathan Mannion – photography
- Nino Montana – coordinator
- Adrienne Muhammad – A&R coordinator

== Charts ==
=== Weekly charts ===
Chart (2002)	Peak position
US Billboard 200	13
US Top R&B/Hip-Hop Albums (Billboard)	2

=== Year-end charts ===
Chart (2002)	Position
US Top R&B/Hip-Hop Albums (Billboard)	91
