= Face Off, Part II =

Studio album by Pastor Troy
- Released: March 1, 2005
- Recorded: 2004–05
- Genre: Southern hip hop; crunk; hardcore hip hop
- Length: 1:05:32
- Label: Money & The Power
- Producer: BIG BRO (exec.); Pastor Troy (also exec.); Blaze; Cooly C; DJ Squeeky; Donnie Scantz; Drumma Boy; Enigma; J; KLC; Mo Chedda Productions; Swisso

Pastor Troy chronology
By Any Means Necessary (2004)	Face Off, Part II (2005)	Stay Tru (2006)

Professional ratings
Review scores
Source	Rating
AllMusic	2.5/5 stars

Face Off, Part II is the eighth solo studio album by American rapper Pastor Troy. It was released on March 1, 2005, through Money & Power Records, serving as a sequel to his 2001 album Face Off. Production was handled by Blaze, Cooley C, DJ Squeeky, Donnie Scantz, Drumma Boy, Enigma, J, KLC, Mo Chedda Productions, Swisso, and Pastor Troy himself. It features guest appearances from Little Pere, Mr. Gary, Pimpin Ken and Sky. The album peaked at number 112 on the Billboard 200, number 18 on the Top R&B/Hip-Hop Albums, number 8 on the Top Rap Albums, and number four on the Independent Albums in the United States.

== Track list ==
No.	Title	Producer(s)	Length
1.	"P.T. Are You Wit Me?"	Pastor Troy	1:38
2.	"WWW? (Who, Want, War)"	Pastor Troy	4:53
3.	"Murder Man"	Swisso	4:11
4.	"Get Dat Money Part II"	Drumma Boy	5:23
5.	"Ridin' Big Part II"	Enigma	3:42
6.	"Arrest in Effect"	Cooly C	3:51
7.	"Equipped in This Game?"	KLC	3:22
8.	"I Wanna Taste You" (featuring Mr. Gary)	J; Blaze	4:16
9.	"Where Them Niggaz At?"	Pastor Troy	3:33
10.	"Just to Fight"	Mo Chedda Productions	3:40
11.	"Yeah!!!"	DJ Squeeky	3:50
12.	"Phone Call to Pimpin Ken.net"		1:59
13.	"Respect Game" (featuring Little Pere and Pimpin Ken)	Pastor Troy	4:04
14.	"Acid Rain (In Memory of Kurt Cobain)" (featuring Sky)	Donnie Scantz	3:57
15.	"Gone Getcha"	Drumma Boy	4:21
16.	"Call to Portis"		1:14
17.	"Keep on Movin'"	Blaze	3:46
18.	Untitled		3:52
Total length:			1:05:32

== Charts ==
Chart (2005)	Peak position
US Billboard 200	112
US Top R&B/Hip-Hop Albums (Billboard)	18
US Top Rap Albums (Billboard)	8
US Independent Albums (Billboard)	4
