= Do It (Rasheeda song) =

Single by Rasheeda featuring Pastor Troy and Re Re

from the album Dirty South
- Released: April 2000
- Recorded: October 1999
- Genre: Rap, crunk
- Length: 3:49
- Label: D-Lo Entertainment and Motown Records
- Songwriter(s): Rasheeda Buckner, N. Jones, Micah Troy, K. Jones

Rasheeda singles chronology
"Do It" (2000)	"Get It On" (2001)

"Do It" is the debut single by rapper Rasheeda, released as the lead single from her debut album Dirty South, which features Pastor Troy and Re Re. Additional vocals were made by Quebo Gold and it was produced by Karesha Jones.

"Do It" was released almost a year prior to the album in April 2000, it peaked on Billboard's Hot Rap Songs chart at number 7 the next month. The music video was released in February 2001.

In 2014, Complex magazine assessed "Do It" as a "major crunk anthem".

== Chart positions ==
Chart (2000)	Peak position
US Hot R&B/Hip-Hop Songs	83
US R&B/Hip-Hop Streaming Songs	94
US Hot Rap Songs	7
