= A Ghetto Dream =

Studio album by Rasheeda
- Released: March 19, 2002
- Recorded: 2001
- Genre: Southern hip hop
- Label: D-Lo

Rasheeda chronology
Dirty South (2001)	A Ghetto Dream (2002)	GA Peach (2006)

A Ghetto Dream is the second album by female rapper Rasheeda. The album was originally scheduled to be released on Motown but after parting ways with that label, A Ghetto Dream was released in March 2002 by D-Lo Entertainment. No singles were released and the album failed to chart.

Professional ratings
Review scores
Source	Rating
RapReviews.com	6/10 stars

== Track listing ==
1. "It's Alright" – 4:30
2. "Let's Get 2 It" (remix) (featuring Pastor Troy) – 4:10
3. "We Ready" (featuring Archie) – 4:08
4. "Jumpsides" (featuring Kelly) – 4:22
5. "Like Us" (featuring Menace) – 4:32
6. "Who U Is" (featuring Baby D, 404 Soldierz, and Noodoz) – 4:12
7. "Watch Ya Self" – 4:26
8. "Let's Get 2 It" – 4:10
9. "Do It" (remix) (featuring Pastor Troy, Cap One, and Que Bo Gold) – 3:51
10. "Say What Cha Want" – 4:01
11. "No Parkin" – 4:12
12. "You Got Me Fucked Up" (featuring Manchild) – 3:34
13. "Get Buck" (featuring Cap One) – 3:06
14. "2 Nite" (featuring Lil Jon & The Eastside Boyz) – 3:53
15. "On Dem Thangs" (featuring Danah) – 3:42
16. "I Got a Problem"/"Don't Stop" (featuring Da Kaperz) – 8:30
