= Attitude Adjuster =

Studio album by Pastor Troy
- Released: February 19, 2008
- Recorded: 2007–2008
- Genre: Southern hip hop, crunk, hardcore hip hop
- Length: 44:56
- Label: Real Talk Entertainment
- Producer: Vince V., Big Hollis, Preach

Pastor Troy chronology
Tool Muziq (2007)	Attitude Adjuster (2008)	A.T.L. (A-Town Legend) (2008)

Professional ratings
Review scores
Source	Rating
HipHopDX	1/5
RapReviews	6.5/10

Attitude Adjuster is the twelfth studio album by the rapper Pastor Troy, released in 2008. Attitude Adjuster debuted at number 116 on the U.S. Billboard 200 chart, selling about 6,400 units its first week.

== Critical reception ==
AllMusic wrote that the album "comes on strong with 'I’m Hot (I Got That Lava)' and doesn’t let up throughout with its barrage of thumping, head-nodding beats and tales of hardcore life delivered in Troy’s amped-up, aggro style."

== Track listing ==
No.	Title	Producer(s)	Length
1.	"It's On (Intro)"	Vince V.	1:34
2.	"I'm Hot (I Got That Lava)"	Vince V.	4:19
3.	"Street Law"	Vince V.	4:16
4.	"Dread & Alive"	Big Hollis & Preach	4:23
5.	"For My Soldiers"	Big Hollis & Preach	4:47
6.	"My Box Chevy"	Vince V.	3:48
7.	"Do You Wanna Dance?"	Big Hollis & Preach	4:02
8.	"Strap Up (Skit)"	Real Talk Entertainment	0:27
9.	"15 Blocks"	Vince V.	4:12
10.	"Down to Ride"	Big Hollis & Preach	4:11
11.	"Attitude Adjuster (Skit)"	Real Talk Entertainment	0:45
12.	"License to Kill"	Big Hollis & Preach	3:26
13.	"Put Him on the Scope"	Vince V.	3:12
14.	"PT Cruiser (Outro)"	Vince V.	1:34

== Chart performance ==
Chart	Peak position
US Billboard 200	116

== Samples ==
The fifth track, "For My Soldiers", samples the song "Shape of My Heart" by Sting. The third track, "Street Law", samples the song "Message in a Bottle" by the Police. "License to Kill" samples the song "Out on a Limb" by Teena Marie.
