= Tool Muziq =

Studio album by Pastor Troy
- Released: July 3, 2007
- Recorded: 2006–07
- Studio: Upstairs Studio (Atlanta, GA)
- Genre: Southern hip hop; crunk; hardcore hip hop
- Length: 54:52
- Label: SMC Recordings
- Producer: Pastor Troy (also exec.); DJ Squeeky; Drumma Boy; J.P.; J. Troy; Lil' Lody; Prophet Posse; Shawty Redd; Zaytoven

Pastor Troy chronology
By Choice or by Force (2006)	Tool Muziq (2007)	Attitude Adjuster (2008)

Professional ratings
Review scores
Source	Rating
AllMusic	4/5 stars
HipHopDX	3/5
Spin	2.5/5 stars
XXL	4/5

Tool Muziq is the eleventh studio album by American rapper Pastor Troy. It was released on July 3, 2007 via SMC Recordings. Recording sessions took place at Upstairs Studio in Atlanta. Production was handled by DJ Squeeky, Shawty Redd, J. Troy, Drumma Boy, J.P., Lil' Lody, Prophet Posse, Zaytoven and Pastor Troy himself. It features guest appearances from 2 Dolla, Fabo, Gangsta Boo, "Hitman" Sammy Sam and Mr. Mudd. The album peaked at number 91 on the US Billboard 200 albums chart.

Originally, this album was to have been called Saddam Hussein, but due to controversy it was decided to change the title. Pastor Troy said that with this album he was going back to his roots, the old style for which he was known at the beginning of his career.

== Track listing ==
No.	Title	Producer(s)	Length
1.	"Tool Muziq"	DJ Squeeky	3:17
2.	"Saddam"	Shawty Redd	3:13
3.	"That's the Move"	Zaytoven	3:55
4.	"I'm Fucked Up"	DJ Squeeky	3:14
5.	"Wanting You" (featuring Gangsta Boo)	Prophet Posse	4:28
6.	"The Belt"	Lil' Lody	3:18
7.	"No Money"	J. Troy	4:18
8.	"Hard for the Money"	DJ Squeeky	4:03
9.	"Digital" (featuring Fabo and 2Dolla)	Shawty Redd	3:43
10.	"In My Truck with Me" (featuring "Hitman" Sammy Sam)	Shawty Redd	5:21
11.	"Still Looking" (featuring Mr. Mudd)	J.P.	4:48
12.	"I'm Down"	Pastor Troy	3:29
13.	"Hey Mama"	J. Troy	3:56
14.	"Will He Come Home Tonight"	Drumma Boy	3:48
Total length:			54:52

== Personnel ==
- Terrence Cash – additional programming, additional producer, engineering, mixing
- J. J. Penders – engineering, mixing assistant
- Chris Athens – mastering
- Micah Troy – executive producer
- Monte "Mont Rock" Malone – production coordinator
- Shannon McCollum – photography
- Will Bronson – A&R

== Charts ==
Chart (2007)	Peak position
US Billboard 200	91
US Independent Albums (Billboard)	9
US Top R&B/Hip-Hop Albums (Billboard)	11
US Top Rap Albums (Billboard)	4
