= Stay Tru =

Studio album by Pastor Troy
- Released: April 18, 2006
- Studio: Upstairs Studio (Atlanta, GA)
- Genre: Southern hip hop
- Length: 51:04
- Label: SMC Recordings
- Producer: Greg Miller (exec.); Jarred Weisfeld (exec.); Pastor Troy (exec.); Cooley C; DJ Brad; Drumma Boy; HIN; Shawty Redd

Pastor Troy chronology
Face Off, Part II (2005)	Stay Tru (2006)	By Choice or by Force (2006)

Professional ratings
Review scores
Source	Rating
HipHopDX	2/5
RapReviews	5.5/10
XXL	3/5

Stay Tru is the ninth solo studio album by American rapper Pastor Troy. It was released on April 18, 2006 via 845 Entertainment/SMC Recordings. Recording sessions took place at Upstairs Studio in Atlanta. Production was handled by P No, Cooley C, DJ Brad, Drumma Boy, HIN, Shawty Redd, and Pastor Troy, who also served as executive producer together with Greg Miller and Jarred Weisfeld. The album peaked at number 150 on the Billboard 200 in the United States.

== Track listing ==
No.	Title	Producer(s)	Length
1.	"Stay Tru"	HIN	4:04
2.	"Me Actin' Up"	P No	3:29
3.	"Skit"	Pastor Troy	0:46
4.	"Lyin' Bout Her Crib"	Cooley C	4:38
5.	"Police Can't Break It Up"	Drumma Boy	4:29
6.	"Where the Hoes"	P No	3:37
7.	"Skit - Idol"	Pastor Troy	1:22
8.	"Well un Huh"	P No	3:45
9.	"Polos & Lacoste"	P No	3:06
10.	"Watcha Say"	Cooley C	3:16
11.	"Heard the Party"	Shawty Redd	3:56
12.	"Attitude Adjuster"	P No	4:10
13.	"Get Down or Lay Down"	DJ Brad	5:36
14.	"Off in This Game"	Drumma Boy	4:50
Total length:			51:04

== Personnel ==
- Micah Troy – lyrics, vocals, producer (tracks: 3, 7), executive producer
- HIN – producer (track 1)
- P No – producer (tracks: 2, 6, 8, 9, 12)
- Cooley C – producer (tracks: 4, 10)
- Christopher "Drumma Boy" Gholson – producer (tracks: 5, 14)
- Demetrius "Shawty Redd" Stewart – producer (track 11)
- DJ Brad – producer (track 13)
- Terrence Cash – engineering, mixing
- Chris Kraus – engineering
- Sean Riggins – engineering
- Ali Eshai – assistant engineering
- Kool Havis – assistant engineering
- Greg Miller – executive producer
- Jarred Weisfeld – executive producer
- Justin Bellamy – A&R
- Michael Holloway – management

== Charts ==
Chart (2006)	Peak position
US Billboard 200	150
US Top R&B/Hip-Hop Albums (Billboard)	21
US Top Rap Albums (Billboard)	12
US Independent Albums (Billboard)	15
