= Book I =

Studio album by Pastor Troy and The Congregation
- Released: 2000
- Recorded: 2000
- Genre: Southern hip hop, crunk, gangsta rap
- Label: Hendu Recordings
- Producer: S.M.K., Pastor Troy

Professional ratings
Review scores
Source	Rating
AllMusic	3/5 stars
The Encyclopedia of Popular Music	3/5 stars

Book I is an album by Pastor Troy and The Congregation, released in 2000.

== Critical reception ==
AllMusic wrote that "these cuts are full of a tightly compressed, even claustrophobic energy that bespeaks too many years spent on the low-rent side of boom-economy America."

== Track listing ==
No.	Title	Producer(s)	Length
1.	"The Intro (Walk Like Y'all Talk It)"	S.M.K.	4:31
2.	"Ghetto Raised"	S.M.K.	4:50
3.	"The Congregation"	S.M.K.	4:22
4.	"Down South Nigga Fa Life"	S.M.K.	2:50
5.	"Havin' A Bad Day"	Pastor Troy	4:53
6.	"Look What I'm Going Thru" (featuring Kingpin Skinny Pimp)	S.M.K.	5:04
7.	"Throw Dem Bows" (featuring Mica B)	S.M.K.	5:03
8.	"Get Em Up" (featuring Lil Pete (of D.S.G.B.)	S.M.K.	5:03
9.	"Dirty South Affiliates"	S.M.K.	3:31
10.	"No Mo Play in G.A."	S.M.K.	5:00

== Personnel ==
Pastor Troy & The Congregation

- Pastor Troy
- S.M.K.
- 11/29

== Additional information ==
- Additional vocals by Darnell Phillips on track 6.
- Additional bass guitar, guitars and keyboards on all tracks by Kevin Haywood.
- Mastered by Rodney Mills at Master House Studios, Atlanta, GA.
- Recorded at Patchwerks Studios, Atlanta, GA, and Purple Dragon Studios, Atlanta, GA.
