= Move (If You Wanna) =

Single by Mims

from the album Guilt
- Released: October 12, 2008
- Recorded: 2008
- Genre: East Coast hip hop
- Length: 3:12
- Label: American King Music
- Songwriter(s): Shawn Mims, Da Internz
- Producer(s): Da Internz

Mims singles chronology
"All I See" (2008)	"Move (If You Wanna)" (2008)	"Love Rollercoaster" (2009)

"Move (If You Wanna)" is the official first single from Mims' second studio album, Guilt. The song was released to radio in October 2008.

The song was featured in an episode of From G's to Gents, and was also featured on the soundtrack to Step Up 3D.

The music video, directed by Keith Schofield, was released on the director's official YouTube page on February 6, 2009 and premiered on 106 & Park on February 27.

Following accusations of copying the rapping style for Move (If You Wanna) from Philadelphia rapper Gillie Da Kid, Mims stated he never met Gillie and was not trying to start beef with anyone. Mims and Gillie would later record the remix for Move (If You Wanna) together.

== Remix ==
There was supposed to be an official remix featuring rapper Tech N9ne, but it was never released. Tech N9ne's verse was released on the re-release of his mixtape, Bad Season, under the name "Move (Acapella Remix)".

== Charts ==
Chart (2008)	Peak position
CIS Airplay (TopHit)	232
US Billboard Hot 100	61
US Hot R&B/Hip-Hop Songs (Billboard)	39
US Hot Rap Songs (Billboard)	11
US Rhythmic (Billboard)	17

== Certifications ==
Region	Certification	Certified units/sales
United States (RIAA)	Gold	500,000^{^}
^{^} Shipments figures based on certification alone.

== Release history ==
Region	Date	Format(s)	Label(s)	Ref.
United States	December 9, 2008	Rhythmic contemporary radio	American King, Capitol	
United States	January 12, 2009	Urban contemporary radio	American King, Capitol	
