= Esther Baxter =

American model and actress

- Born: September 24, 1984 (age 41); Miami, Florida, U.S.
- Modeling information
- Height: 5 ft 7 in (1.70 m)
- Hair color: Black/Brown
- Eye color: Hazel

Esther Baxter (born September 24, 1984) is an American model and actress.

== Biography ==
Baxter rose to prominence after being featured in the music video for Petey Pablo's single "Freek-a-Leek" in 2004. Since then, she has appeared in several music videos, including Ludacris's "Number One Spot", Will Smith's "Switch", Nelly's "Shake Ya Tailfeather" and Kanye West's "The New Workout Plan". In addition to video success, she has also been in a number of magazines, such as Smooth, VIBE, King, and XXL.

She has been dubbed "Miss Freek-a-Leek" due to her appearance in Petey Pablo's video.

As of August 2007, Baxter has retired from modeling and video shoots in order to attend college.

She was featured on the cover of King's September/October 2011 issue. In an interview, she spoke about her transition from modeling to acting.

She is of African-American, Norwegian, Puerto Rican, Cuban and Indian descent.

== Personal life ==
She took a two-year hiatus to stay at home and raise her son, Cayden, from a previous relationship.

== See also ==
- Hip hop models
