= Dat Type of Gurl =

Studio album by Rasheeda
- Released: June 19, 2007
- Recorded: 2006–2007
- Genre: Crunk, dirty rap, Southern hip hop
- Length: 57:33
- Label: D-Lo, Atlantic
- Producer: The-Dream, Jazze Pha, Nitti, Akon, H Snow Beatz, Westwood Shawty, NateDogg

Rasheeda chronology
GA Peach (2006)	Dat Type of Gurl (2007)	Certified Hot Chick (2009)

Singles from Dat Type of Gurl
- 1. "Got That Good (My Bubble Gum)" Released: May 22, 2007

Dat Type of Gurl is the fourth studio album by American rapper Rasheeda. It was released on June 19, 2007, by Atlantic Records. The album peaked at number 80 on the Billboard Top R&B/Hip-Hop Albums chart.

"Got That Good (My Bubble Gum)", was released as a single on May 22, 2007, and peaked at number 55 on the Billboard Hot R&B/Hip-Hop Songs chart.

== Track listing ==
1. "Type a Girl" – 3:30
2. "Flawsin'" – 3:44
3. "Got That Good (My Bubble Gum)" – 3:28
4. "Doin' This" (featuring Fabo) – 3:25
5. "Let It Clap" (featuring Akon) – 3:57
6. "Never Wanna Leave" (featuring Kandi Burruss) – 3:45
7. "Pack Ya Bags" (featuring Kalenna Harper) – 3:47
8. "Georgia Peach" – 4:21
9. "Give It to Me" (featuring The-Dream) – 3:47
10. "Touch Ya Toes (Bend Ova)" – 3:35
11. "Dance Flo'" (featuring Lil Mama) – 4:14
12. "Holla at Me" (featuring Birdman and Jazze Pha) – 3:41
13. "Do Yo Thang" (featuring Skinny P and Tex James of Kadalack Boyz) – 3:55
14. "U Can Get It" – 3:50
15. "Poppin' Bottles" (featuring Pastor Troy) – 4:12
16. "Got That Good (My Bubble Gum)" (remix) (featuring Kandi Burruss, Fabo, and Diamond and Princess of Crime Mob) [bonus track] – 3:44

== Production ==
- Westwood Shawty – track 1, 6
- The-Dream – track 2, 9
- Akon – track 5
- Young Jersey – track 8
- Nate Dogg – track 10
- H Snow Beatz – track 11
- Jazze Pha – track 12
- Coca Baby – track 13
- Nitti – track 14
