= By Any Means Necessary (Pastor Troy album) =

Studio album by Pastor Troy
- Released: March 23, 2004
- Recorded: 2003–2004
- Genre: Southern hip hop; crunk; hardcore hip hop
- Length: 45:47
- Label: Universal Records
- Producer: Pastor Troy (exec.); Al Troy (exec.); Robert "Georgia Boy" Watson (exec.); DJ Toomp; Michael "Kook" Mason; Oomp Camp; Cooly C; Da Masta; Khalifani; Limesha Wright; Taj Mahal

Pastor Troy chronology
Universal Soldier (2002)	By Any Means Necessary (2004)	Face Off, Part II (2005)

Professional ratings
Review scores
Source	Rating
AllMusic	2.5/5 stars
RapReviews	4.5/10
Vibe	2.5/5 marks

By Any Means Necessary is the seventh studio album by American rapper Pastor Troy. It was released on March 23, 2004 through Universal Records, making it the artist's third and final record for the label. Production was handled by DJ Toomp, Michael "Kook" Mason, Oomp Camp, Cooly C, Da Masta, Khalifani, Limesha Wright and Taj Mahal, with Al Troy, Pastor Troy and Robert "Georgia Boy" Watson serving as executive producers. It features guest appearances from 8Ball, Chip, DJ Mars, Juvenile, Lil Pete, Lil' Will and Ms. Shyneka. The album peaked at number 30 on the Billboard 200 and at number 7 on the Top R&B/Hip-Hop Albums in the United States.

== Track listing ==
No.	Title	Writer(s)	Producer(s)	Length
1.	"I'm Warning Ya (Intro)"	Micah Troy; Carl Dorsey	Cooly C	2:12
2.	"Crank Me Up"	Troy; Manuel Morris	Khalifani	3:30
3.	"Ridin' Big"	Troy; Aldrin Davis	DJ Toomp	3:44
4.	"Atlanta"	Troy	Da Masta	3:13
5.	"Representin'"	Troy	Oomp Camp	3:20
6.	"About to Go Down"	Troy; Davis	DJ Toomp	3:45
7.	"Off the Chain" (featuring Ms. Shyneka)	Troy; S. Richardson; Michael Mason	Kook	4:14
8.	"Benz" (featuring DJ Mars)	Troy; Taj Tilghman	Taj Mahal	3:19
9.	"Lil' Snap & Lil Killa"		Limesha Wright	2:55
10.	"Boys to Men" (featuring Chip and 8Ball)	Troy; Premro Smith; Mason	Kook	4:23
11.	"Crazy" (featuring Lil' Will)	Troy; Lil' Will; Davis	DJ Toomp	3:28
12.	"Nice Change" (featuring Peter the Disciple and Juvenile)	Troy; Terius Gray; R. Jackson	Oomp Camp	3:42
13.	"Fuck Them Niggaz"	Troy; Mason	Kook	4:02
Total length:				45:47

== Charts ==
Chart (2004)	Peak position
US Billboard 200	30
US Top R&B/Hip-Hop Albums (Billboard)	7
