= Dirty South (album) =

Studio album by Rasheeda
- Released: October 10, 2000
- Recorded: 1999–2000
- Studios: 40th Street Studios; D-Lo Studios (Atlanta, GA); Upfront Entertainment (Atlanta, GA); Basement Beats (St. Louis, MO); Silent Sound (Atlanta, GA)
- Genre: Southern hip-hop
- Length: 54:52
- Labels: D-Lo; Motown
- Producers: Akon; DJ Jelly; Freddie B; Jay E; Jazze Pha; Kool-Ace; Re Re; Robert McDowell; Sanchez Holmes; Stokley Watson

Rasheeda chronology
Dirty South (2000)	A Ghetto Dream (2002)

Singles from Dirty South
- 1. "Do It" Released: April 2000; 2. "Get It On" Released: April 18, 2001; 3. "Off da Chain" Released: July 10, 2001

Professional ratings
Review scores
Source	Rating
AllMusic	1.5/5 stars
RapReviews	5.5/10

Dirty South is the debut solo studio album by American rapper Rasheeda. It was released on October 10, 2000 via D-Lo Entertainment and Motown Record Company. Production was handled by Re Re, Rob McDowell, Akon, DJ Jelly, Freddie B, Jason "Jay E" Epperson, Jazze Pha, Kool-Ace, Sanchez Holmes and Stokley Watson. It features guest appearances from Que Bo Gold, Akon, Bone Crusher, Danah Lewis, Jazze Pha, Nandi, Nelly, Pastor Troy, Slim, Thugz Nation, Lil' Jon & the East Side Boyz.

The first single off of the album, "Do It", which was released priory, made it to number 83 on the Hot R&B/Hip-Hop Songs, number 94 on the R&B/Hip-Hop Streaming Songs, number 7 on the Hot Rap Songs and number 22 on the Hot R&B/Hip-Hop Singles Sales charts in the United States.

The album itself was not well received as it reached only number 77 on the Top R&B/Hip-Hop Albums chart in the US, thus Rasheeda was released from her contract with Motown. An accompanying music video for "Do It" was released in February 2001. Two subsequent singles—"Get It On", released in April, and "Off da Chain", released in July—both failed to chart.

== Track listing ==
No.	Title	Writer(s)	Producer(s)	Length
1.	"Intro"		Rasheeda	2:08
2.	"Do It" (featuring Pastor Troy, Que Bo Gold and Re Re)	Rasheeda Buckner; Micah Troy; Niqua Jones; Karesha Jones	Re Re	3:51
3.	"Ain't Nuttin'" (featuring Jim Crow and Thugz Nation)	Buckner; Jamal Jones; Damon Green; Michael Vinson; K. Jones	Re Re	3:34
4.	"Off da Chain" (featuring Jazze Pha)	Buckner; Phalon Alexander	Jazze Pha	3:55
5.	"Block to Block" (featuring Akon)	Buckner; Aliaune Thiam; Torry Pettigrew	Akon	2:45
6.	"ATL 2 STL" (featuring Nelly)	Buckner; Cornell Haynes; Jason Epperson; Brian Fleming; Kirk Frost	Jay E	2:53
7.	"Get It On" (featuring Slim)	Buckner; Marvin Scandrick; Marquinarius Holmes; Inga S. Willis	RockHead	4:10
8.	"Make It Hot" (featuring Akon)	Buckner; Thiam; Frost	Akon	3:29
9.	"Mr. Baller" (featuring Danah Lewis)	Buckner; Stokley Watson; Willis; Frost	Stokley Watson	3:48
10.	"They Don't Understand" (featuring Que Bo Gold)	Buckner; N. Jones; K. Jones	Re Re	3:42
11.	"No Trust (Don't Try)" (featuring Bonecrusher and Nandi)	Buckner; Willis; Robert McDowell	R.O.B.	3:32
12.	"What Cha Workin' Wit"	Buckner; Frederick Hall; Frost; Leon Smith	Freddie B; DJ Jelly	3:40
13.	"Everywhere I Go"	Buckner; McDowell; Fleming	R.O.B.	3:48
14.	"I Am da Shit" (featuring Que Bo Gold)	Buckner; N. Jones; Fleming	Kool-Ace	4:06
15.	"Faizon Phone Skit/Not Tonight" (featuring Lil' Jon & The Eastside Boyz)	Buckner; Jonathan Smith; McDowell	R.O.B.	5:31
Total length:				54:52

Sample credits

- Track 2 embodies portions of "Stick 'Em" written by Mark Morales, Damon Wimbley and Darren Robinson.

== Charts ==
Chart (2001)	Peak position
US Top R&B/Hip-Hop Albums (Billboard)	77
