= This Is Why I'm Hot =

2007 single by Mims

Single by Mims

from the album Music Is My Savior
- Released: December 12, 2006
- Recorded: 2006
- Genre: Hip hop
- Length: 4:13
- Label: American King Music, Capitol
- Songwriter: Shawn Mims
- Producers: Blackout Movement, Mike Moosh

Mims singles chronology
"This Is Why I'm Hot" (2006)	"Like This" (2007)

"This Is Why I'm Hot" is the debut single by American rapper Mims. The song was co-written by Mims and produced by Blackout Movement for his first album Music Is My Savior (2007).

Released in December 2006, the song reached No. 1 on the U.S. Billboard Hot 100 chart, as well as No. 2 on the Billboard Hot R&B/Hip-Hop Songs chart and No. 1 on the Billboard Hot Rap Tracks chart, eventually being certified platinum by the RIAA.

The song entered at number one on the Billboard Hot Digital Songs chart, selling 140,874 downloads. It remained the top-selling digital single for one additional week.

Eventually, the success of the song in the United States saw a release in the United Kingdom in May 2007, where the single peaked at No. 18 on the UK Singles Chart on the week dated June 3, 2007. The song was also featured in the soundtrack of the film Due Date.

== Song highlights ==
The song features samples and interpolations of various hip-hop songs, including Kanye West's "Jesus Walks", E-40's "Tell Me When to Go", Dr. Dre and Snoop Dogg's "Nuthin' But a "G" Thang" and Mobb Deep's "Shook Ones Part II". Each sampled song is played when Mims mentions the area from which each artist originated.

This is one of the songs used by baseball player Alex Rodriguez as a walkup song prior to a plate appearance during his career.

== Critical reception ==
The song received mostly positive to mixed reviews by critics.

William Ketchum III of About stated Mims is "striving to 'bring New York back' like his peers" on the song. He continued to comment about the song's chart success, stating: "With 'This Is Why I'm Hot' continuing to burn up the charts, he's proven what he's got, but let's see if he can stay on top." The song received a three out of five star rating from the site.

On their review of the album Music Is My Savior, AllMusic stated that "the deceptively simple 'This Is Why I'm Hot' demonstrates this well. MIMS raps about his nationwide appeal over hyphy-esque production that alludes to other influential MCs." The track was listed as an "AMG track pick" on the review page.

On his review of Music Is My Savior, Christian Hoard of Rolling Stone described the song as "a catchy little thing with a cool, minimalist beat and some goofy charm."

== Remixes ==
The official remix, entitled the "Blackout Remix", which is the only reggae fusion version of the song, features dancehall artist Cham and reggae singer Junior Reid. This version is featured on Music Is My Savior.

- There is also an official reggaeton remix of the song, entitled "Por Eso Estoy Pegao", which features Daddy Yankee. Another reggaeton remix, based on the Blackout Remix, features Tego Calderón and Don Omar. An alternate reggaeton remix features Tego Calderon, Calle 13 and Willie Style.
- Rapper Twista made a song entitled "This Is Why I'm Cold".
- Rapper Lil Wayne performed a freestyle over the beat as an intro for Da Drought 3.
- Rapper Talib Kweli made a remix entitled "Niggas Lie a Lot".
- Rap-rave group Die Antwoord made a remix entitled "Dis Iz Why I'm Hot (zef remix)".
- Rapper Прыгай киска made a song entitled "Как же я горяч"

== Chart performance ==
By early March 2007, the online release of the song had propelled it from number 32 to number one on the Billboard Hot 100 in one week; this was then the third-greatest rise to number one in the history of the Billboard Hot 100. It remained at number one the next week until it was surpassed by "Glamorous", by Fergie and Ludacris the week after in the issue dated March 24, 2007.

=== Charts ===
Weekly chart performance for "This Is Why I'm Hot"
Chart (2007)	Peak position
Australia (ARIA)	30
Australian Urban (ARIA)	7
Belgium (Ultratip Bubbling Under Flanders)	24
Canada Hot 100 (Billboard)	19
Canada CHR/Top 40 (Billboard)	8
Denmark (Tracklisten)	28
European Hot 100 Singles (Billboard)	44
Finland (Suomen virallinen lista)	14
France (SNEP)	45
Germany (GfK)	55
Ireland (IRMA)	33
New Zealand (Recorded Music NZ)	23
Scottish Singles Sales (Official Charts)	31
Sweden (Sverigetopplistan)	37
Switzerland (Schweizer Hitparade)	75
UK Singles (Official Charts)	18
UK Hip Hop/R&B (Official Charts)	5
US Billboard Hot 100	1
US Hot R&B/Hip-Hop Songs (Billboard)	2
US Hot Rap Songs (Billboard)	1
US Pop Airplay (Billboard)	11
US Pop 100 (Billboard)	4
US Rhythmic Airplay (Billboard)	1

=== Year-end charts ===
Year-end chart performance for "This Is Why I'm Hot"
Chart (2007)	Position
US Billboard Hot 100	16
US Hot R&B/Hip-Hop Songs (Billboard)	23
US Hot Rap Songs (Billboard)	3
US Pop 100 (Billboard)	26
US Rhythmic (Billboard)	6

== Certifications ==
Certifications for "This Is Why I'm Hot"
Region	Certification	Certified units/sales
United States (RIAA)	2× Platinum	2,000,000^{^}
Ringtone
Canada (Music Canada)	5× Platinum	200,000^{*}
United States (RIAA)	Platinum	1,000,000^{*}
^{*} Sales figures based on certification alone.^{^} Shipments figures based on certification alone.

== See also ==
- List of Billboard Hot 100 number-one singles of 2007
