= Blackout (musician) =

Winston 'DJ BlackOut' Thomas
- Born: Winston Thomas; Freeport, NY, United States
- Genre: Hip hop
- Occupations: Record producer, engineer, composer, mixing engineer, A&R
- Years active: 2004–present
- Labels: BlackOut Movement CEO, RecordGram (Co-Founder)
- Website: djblackout.com%20djblackout.com

Winston Thomas, better known by his stage name BlackOut or DJ BlackOut, founder & CEO of BlackOut Movement, is an American record producer, engineer and composer. Blackout is signed to Nicki Minaj's recording company Pink Friday Records. Blackout is also co-founder of the music tech startup company, RecordGram.

== Life and career ==
BlackOut was born "Winston Thomas" in Freeport, NY. His father is from Kingston, Jamaica, while his mother is from Mandeville, Jamaica. He got his start working high school parties and local clubs in the New York area. It was in the club that he got his first break and met Wyclef Jean. Blackout joined the Refugee Camp as a deejay for the artist, Reptile, and got his first taste of touring in the music industry. During his time with the Refugee Camp, Blackout began dabbling in production and made it his hobby. It wasn't long before he became a staple in the deejay industry and began playing gigs nationwide. He eventually became linked with Jada Kiss and toured with him for three years. While playing a gig in a South Beach club, D.J. Blackout slipped a CD of beats to hip hop artist, Ja Rule. This chance meeting would mark the beginning of Blackout's career as a music producer. One of BlackOut's beats was selected to be on Ja Rule's Blood In My Eye Album. Soon after, BlackOut started his own production company Blackout Movement. Full steam ahead, BlackOut and his new company catapulted to the top of the game 1 year later when the company produced the debut album from hip-hop artist Mims, including the widely popular single “This Is Why I'm Hot”. Blackout Movement has since worked with some of the leading artists in the industry. In 2012, Blackout signed to Nicki Minaj's, Pink Friday record label. BlackOut is also co-founder of RecordGram, a music tech startup. RecordGram is 1 of 7 music tech companies to be accepted into Project Music, the music tech accelerator program in Nashville.

== Production style ==
BlackOut produces various genres of music. Hip Hop, Pop, R&B, Reggae, and Dance Music. BlackOut states "being a DJ, I am exposed to a lot of music, all the time. That keeps me up to date" BlackOut chiefly produces with Akai MPC4000 and Pro Tools, and just recently been using Native Instruments' MASCHINE and LOGIC to create as he travels.

== Production discography ==
=== Singles ===
Year	Single	U.S. Hot 100	U.S. R&B	U.S. Rap	U.S. Pop	Album
2007	"This Is Why I'm Hot"	1	2	1	11	Music Is My Savior
2007	"Like This" (featuring Rasheeda)	32	54	11	24	Music Is My Savior

Year	Title	Artist	Album
2004	Niggas & Bitches	Ja Rule	Blood In My Eye
2005	No Daddy	Teairra Mari	Teairra Mari
2005	Crunk Muzik	Jim Jones ft Camron & Juelz Santana	On My Way To Church
2005	Spanish Fly	Jim Jones feat Chico De Barge	On My Way To Church
2005	Life As A Ridah	Jim Jones	On My Way To Church
2005	Bend n Stretch	Jim Jones	On My Way To Church
2006	Leave You Alone	Camron	Killa Season
2006	This Is Why Im Hot	MIMS	M.I.M.S. (#1 Single)
2007	Superman	MIMS	M.I.M.S. (ALBUM)
2007	Without You	MIMS feat LaToya Luckett	M.I.M.S. (ALBUM)
2007	Like This	MIMS	M.I.M.S. (ALBUM)
2007	They Don't Wanna Play	MIMS feat Bun B	M.I.M.S. (ALBUM)
2007	Don't Cry	MIMS	M.I.M.S. (ALBUM)
2007	Cop It	MIMS	M.I.M.S. (ALBUM)
2007	I Did You Wrong	MIMS	M.I.M.S. (ALBUM)
2007	Its Alright	MIMS	M.I.M.S. (ALBUM)
2007	This Is Why Im Hot (Reggae Version)	MIMS ft Junior Reid & Cham	M.I.M.S. (ALBUM)
2007	This Is Why Im Hot (Rock Version)	MIMS feat Purple Popcorn	Microsoft Zune Commercial
2008	Cocaine	UGK	Underground Kingz
2008	She Can Get It	DJ Laz feat Mims & Elijah	Category 6
2008	Ghetto Soldier	Kymani Marley	RADIO
2008	Like This	MIMS	NOW Compilation #25
2009	Naked	Serani	No Games
2009	Be With You	Serani	No Games
2009	Dance With Me	Aaron Carter feat Flo Rida	Dance With Me
2009	There He Go	Fabolous feat Red Cafe	Loso's Way
2009	One Day	MIMS feat Kymani Marley	Guilt
2009	Life Of A Star	MIMS	Guilt
2009	One Last Kiss	MIMS feat Soler Mesh	Guilt
2009	Heal Me	MIMS	Guilt
2010	If It Was Up To Me	Bun B feat Junior Reid	Trill
2010	Perfect	Jaicko	Jaicko
2010	Its My Birthday	Ultimate feat Calibe	Ultimate Domination
2010	Encore	Jason Derulo	Jason Derulo
2010	White Girl	Trina feat Flo Rida & Git Fresh	Amazin
2010	Boom Shaka Laka	Brianna feat Flo Rida	Girl Talk
2011	Dance With Me	Justice Crew feat Flo Rida	Justice Crew (Single)
2011	Blow Ya Mind	Nicki Minaj	Pink Friday
2012	Roman Holiday	Nicki Minaj	Pink Friday: Roman Reloaded
2012	FML (Fuck My Life)	Don Omar feat MIMS	Don Omar (Single)
2014	Angel	Prostyle feat Nicki Minaj, Jeremih	Prostyle (Single)
2015	Build	Sean Paul	Single
2015	All In	Sean Paul ft MIMS, Amara La Negra	Single
2016	Put It On	Shaggy	Single
2016	Take You Home	DJ Shadow ft Sean Paul, Badshah	Single

== Awards and nominations ==
Year	Organization	Award	Work	Result
2008	ASCAP AWARDS	Ringtone Of The Year	Producer (MIMS - This Is Why Im Hot)	Won
2008	ASCAP AWARDS	POP Music Award	Producer (MIMS - This Is Why Im Hot)	Won
2008	ASCAP AWARDS	#1 Performed Song of 2007	Producer (MIMS - This Is Why Im Hot)	Won
2012	54th Grammy Awards	Best Rap Album	Nicki Minaj (Production)	Nominated
2012	Latin Grammy Awards	Best Urban Album	Don Omar presents MTO2	Won
