= Like This (Mims song) =

Single by Mims featuring Rasheeda

from the album Music Is My Savior
- B-side: "Just Like That"
- Released: February 20, 2007
- Recorded: 2007
- Genre: Hip hop
- Length: 3:23
- Label: American King Music; Capitol Records; 3rd Street
- Songwriters: Mims, S. Schofield, D. Thomas, W.
- Producer: Blackout Movement

Mims singles chronology
"This Is Why I'm Hot" (2007)	"Like This" (2007)	"Just Like That" (2007)

Rasheeda singles chronology
"Touch Ya Toes" (2006)	"Like This" (2007)	"Got That Good (My Bubble Gum)" (2007)

"Like This" is the second single from Mims' debut album, Music Is My Savior. It features guest vocals from Disturbing tha Peace singer Rasheeda, while Jamaican deejay Junior Reid is featured in its accompanying music video.

The track uses string productions, sampler, and synthesizer.

== Remixes ==
The 2 official remixes were released with both featuring different artists, except Rasheeda & Sean Kingston, who are featured in both of them.

The 1st official remix, the main remix, features Rasheeda, Sha Dirty, Sean Kingston, Red Cafe, and N.O.R.E., the remix being featured on Mims' mixtape More Than Meets the Eye. There are 2 additional versions of this remix: both featured Sean Kingston, the first remix featured Red Cafe, and the second remix featured N.O.R.E.

The second official remix entitled as the "Reggae Remix," features Rasheeda, Sean Kingston, Mr. Vegas, and Vybz Kartel.

== Charts ==
Chart performance for "Like This"
Chart (2007)	Peak position
Scotland Singles (OCC)	59
UK Singles (OCC)	82
UK Hip Hop/R&B (OCC)	10
US Billboard Hot 100	32
US Hot R&B/Hip-Hop Songs (Billboard)	54
US Hot Rap Songs (Billboard)	11
US Pop Airplay (Billboard)	24
US Pop 100 (Billboard)	38
US Rhythmic Airplay (Billboard)	10

== Certifications ==
Certifications for "Like This"
Region	Certification	Certified units/sales
United States (RIAA)	Gold	500,000^{^}
^{^} Shipments figures based on certification alone.
