= Music Is My Savior =

Studio album by Mims
- Released: March 27, 2007
- Recorded: 2006–2007
- Studio: BlackOut Studios (Miami, Florida); 2wizlin' Studios (Pasadena, California); SoundisGeto Studios (Independence, Missouri); Studio Atlantis
- Genre: Hip-hop
- Length: 57:30
- Label: Capitol
- Producer: BlackOut; DannyBoyStyles; D. Baker; Kobayashi; The Vault Productions; Thomas Simons; Twizz; Ty Fyffe

Mims chronology
Music Is My Savior (2007)	Guilt (2009)

Singles from Music Is My Savior
- 1. "This Is Why I'm Hot" Released: December 12, 2006; 2. "Like This" Released: February 20, 2007

Music Is My Savior is the debut studio album by American rapper Mims. It was released on March 27, 2007, via Capitol Records.

Recording sessions took place at BlackOut Studios in Miami, 2wizlin' Studios in Pasadena, SoundisGeto Studios in Independence, and Studio Atlantis. Production was handled by the Blackout Movement members Winston Thomas, Danny Schofield and Thomas Simons, D. Baker, Twizz, Kobayashi, the Vault Productions and Ty Fyffe. It features guest appearances from Bun B, J. Holiday, LeToya Luckett, Purple Popcorn, the Bad Seed, Baby Cham and Junior Reid.

In the United States, the album debuted at number 4 on the Billboard 200, number 2 on both the Top R&B/Hip-Hop Albums and Top Rap Albums and number 7 on the Tastemaker Albums charts, selling 78,000 copies sold in the first week. It also made it to number 109 on the French Albums Chart and number 14 on the UK Hip Hop and R&B Albums Chart.

Its lead single, "This Is Why I'm Hot", reached the number-one spot on the Billboard Hot 100, number 14 on the Official Finnish Charts, number 18 on the UK singles chart, number 19 on the Canadian Hot 100, top 40 in New Zealand, Australia and Sweden, and top 75 in France, Germany and Switzerland. The Recording Industry Association of America certified the song Platinum on March 22, 2007 for the sales of 1,000,000 copies and double Platinum on October 2, 2012 for the digital sales of 2,000,000 units in the US alone.

The album's second single, "Like This", made it to number 32 on the US Billboard Hot 100 and number 82 on the UK singles charts, and received Gold certification by the RIAA on October 2, 2012.

The song "Cop It" was featured in the EA Sports game Madden 08. A snippet of the song "Superman" was used in Britain's Got Talent 2009 winners Diversity's routine.

== Critical reception ==
Professional ratings
Aggregate scores
Source	Rating
Metacritic	64/100
Review scores
Source	Rating
About.com	2/5 stars
AllMusic	3.5/5 stars
Entertainment Weekly	B
HipHopDX	3/5
Los Angeles Times	1.5/4 stars
RapReviews	7/10
Rolling Stone	3/5 stars
The Guardian	3/5 stars

Music Is My Savior was met with generally favorable reviews from music critics. At Metacritic, which assigns a normalized rating out of 100 to reviews from mainstream publications, the album received an average score of 64 based on eight reviews.

In her album review for AllMusic, Marisa Brown praised the artist, saying: "he can focus on the serious, the sentimental, or the fun side of life when he needs to, but he does it all without seeming like he's forcing out a persona". Simon Vozick-Levinson of Entertainment Weekly stated: "the disc contains more than a few moments where Mims' quick, confident style recalls Jay-Z's mid-'90s blinged-out phase". Steve 'Flash' Juon of RapReviews wrote: "these may be simple tales, but Mims' flow is a smooth Manhattan flow clearly influenced by the likes of New York greats like Jay-Z while still vocally unique enough to entice a listener to pay attention". Ken Capobianco of The Boston Globe called the album a "fluid, likable disc".

In mixed reviews, Christian Hoard of Rolling Stone stated: "Mims can't carry a whole album, and Savior is long on quasi-Southern junk rhymes about Mims' general excellence and panty-melting suaveness". Alex Macpherson of The Guardian found the album "generic, yes, but that is no cause for complaint when the genre is so good". Chris Yuscavage of Vibe called it "a tepid debut". Serena Kim of Los Angeles Times concluded: "peel away the accessibility of his fluffy debut and there's nothing but major-label album fodder".

== Track listing ==
No.	Title	Writer(s)	Producer(s)	Length
1.	"Intro"	Shawn Mims; Winston Thomas; Daniel Schofield	BlackOut; DannyBoyStyles	2:13
2.	"It's Alright"	Mims; Thomas; Schofield; Ray Charles	BlackOut; DannyBoyStyles; DJ Menace (co.)	3:17
3.	"This Is Why I'm Hot"	Mims; Thomas; Schofield; Thomas Simons; Curtis Lundy; Leon Haywood	BlackOut; DannyBoyStyles; Thomas Simons	4:13
4.	"Girlfriends Fav MC" (featuring J. Holiday)	Mims; Timothy Bailey Jr.; Derek Baker	Twizz; D. Baker	3:39
5.	"Where I Belong"	Mims; Tyrone Fyffe; Jay Asher; Paul Jabara	Ty Fyffe	3:51
6.	"Cop It"	Mims; Simons	Thomas Simons	3:01
7.	"Big Black Train"	Mims; Bailey Jr.; Baker	Twizz; D. Baker	3:55
8.	"They Don't Wanna Play" (featuring Bun B and the Bad Seed)	Mims; Thomas; Schofield; Simons	BlackOut; DannyBoyStyles; Thomas Simons	4:05
9.	"Like This"	Mims; Thomas; Schofield	BlackOut; DannyBoyStyles	3:23
10.	"Just Like That"	Mims; Brendan Yearwood	The Vault Productions	3:20
11.	"Without You" (featuring LeToya Luckett)	Mims; Thomas; Schofield; Simons	BlackOut; DannyBoyStyles; Thomas Simons	4:12
12.	"Superman"	Mims; Thomas; Schofield	BlackOut; DannyBoyStyles	3:27
13.	"This Is Why I'm Hot (Blackout Remix)" (featuring Cham and Junior Reid)	Mims; Thomas; Schofield; Simons; Dawn Pickering; Rodney Price; Winston Riley	BlackOut; DannyBoyStyles; Thomas Simons	3:37
14.	"Doctor Doctor"	Mims; F. Joseph; Robert Fripp; Michael Giles; Greg Lake; Ian McDonald; Peter Sinfield	Kobayashi	3:40
15.	"Don't Cry (Outro)" (featuring Purple Dragon)	Mims; Thomas; Schofield	BlackOut; DannyBoyStyles	4:06
16.	"I Did You Wrong" (bonus track)	Mims; Thomas; Schofield	BlackOut; DannyBoyStyles	3:31
Total length:				57:30

Sample credits

- Track 2 contains elements of "It's All Right" by Ray Charles.
- Track 3 contains interpolations from the composition "I Wanna Do Something Freaky To You". Written by Leon Haywood.
- Track 5 contains samples from the composition "Eternal Love" written by Jay Asher and Paul Jabara as performed by Stephanie Mills.
- Track 13 contains a sample of the composition "You Don't Love Me (No, No, No)" performed by Dawn Penn and samples from "Stalag 17" written by Winston Riley.
- Track 14 contains material sampled from "Moonchild" performed by King Crimson.

== Charts ==
=== Weekly charts ===
Chart (2007)	Peak position
Canadian Albums (Nielsen SoundScan)	67
French Albums (SNEP)	109
UK Albums (OCC)	151
UK R&B Albums (OCC)	14
US Billboard 200	4
US Top R&B/Hip-Hop Albums (Billboard)	2
US Top Rap Albums (Billboard)	2
US Tastemakers (Billboard)	7

=== Year-end charts ===
Chart (2007)	Position
US Billboard 200	192
US Top R&B/Hip-Hop Albums (Billboard)	76
