= GA Peach =

Studio album by Rasheeda
- Released: April 25, 2006
- Recorded: 2005–2006
- Genre: Crunk, dirty rap, snap, southern hip hop
- Label: D-Lo; Big Cat; Jive
- Producer: Shiwen Shann; Nitti; Akon; Scott Storch; Lil Jon; Shawty Redd; FATBOI; The Neptunes; Jasper; Stokley Watson

Rasheeda chronology
A Ghetto Dream (2002)	GA Peach (2006)	Dat Type of Gurl (2007)

Singles from GA Peach
- 1. "Georgia Peach" Released: March 14, 2006; 2. "Touch Ya Toes" Released: July 25, 2006; 3. "Got That Good (My Bubble Gum)" Released: November 7, 2006

GA Peach is the third studio album by the American rapper Rasheeda. It was released on April 25, 2006. The album was released after Rasheeda's four-year career hiatus. The album is considered her "comeback" album, because although it was unsuccessful, it helped her to "bounce back" from the failure of her second album. The lead single, "Georgia Peach" was mildly successful, but the second and third singles failed to reach the same success.

The album also aimed to sexually exhibit and upfront a more provocatively naughtier, racier, raunchier, and sexier side of herself than her first two albums with the album having a heavier focus on more up-tempo crunk and snap-oriented songs geared for the nightclubs. The album is also Rasheeda's second independently released album and her sole album release under Big Cat Records.

== Background ==
Frost's first two albums were very unsuccessful, so she decided to take a break from her music career. In early 2005, Rasheeda began to look for a new label, and she signed a dual contract with D-Lo Entertainment and Big Cat Records. In late 2005, she began work on her third studio album, aimed with an artistic objective to explicitly exhibit and upfront a more alluringly sultry, seductive, and sexually suggestive side of herself in the third album compared to her first two solo efforts. During the recording process, Frost desired to have her third studio album to be more nightclub-oriented, with the album tailored more towards an up-tempo club-oriented approach, style, and theme that exuded a club-friendly appeal. Commissioning the album track listing to be centered on a more heavier focus towards more up-tempo crunk, snap, and other southern hip hop club-oriented songs catered to the southern hip hop nightclub scene enabled Frost to demonstrate to her fanbase on how she had matured from the girl that everyone knew from her first two albums.

== Singles ==
- "Georgia Peach" was released as the lead single from the album on March 14, 2006. No music video was produced for the single, which was mildly successful. It only reached #89 on the US R&B/Hip-Hop Songs chart.
- "Touch Ya Toes" was released as the second single from the album on July 25, 2006. No music video was produced for the single, and it failed to chart.
- "Got That Good (My Bubble Gum)" was released as the third and final single from the album on November 7, 2006.

== Sales and chart performance ==
The album debuted at #81 on the Billboard 200.

== Track listing ==
1. "Georgia Peach"
2. "You Can Get It"
3. "Touch Ya Toes"
4. "Don't Hate" (featuring Jody Breeze)
5. "Buy My Drink"
6. "See Me Naked" (with Jasper)
7. "Pack Ya Bags" (featuring Kalenna Harper)
8. "Type a Girl"
9. "Lifestyle" (featuring Gangsta Boo, Diamond and Princess of Crime Mob)
10. "Every Rapper Can't Trap"
11. "Let It Clap" (featuring Akon)
12. "Chanel Shades"
13. "Bring It to Mamma" (mislabelled as "Bring It Mamma" on back cover, but is correct in booklet)
14. "Hold Whatcha Got"
15. "Who Can Love You...?"
16. "Got That Good (My Bubble Gum)"
17. "Poppin Bottles" (Bonus Track) (featuring Pastor Troy)

== Unreleased tracks ==
- "Rocked Away" (featuring Lil Scrappy)
- "Let's Get This Money" (featuring Young Jeezy)
- "Give Ya Whatcha Want" (featuring Kalenna Harper)
- "Head-n-Choose"
- "I'm The Game"
- "What It Hit For"
- "She Fire" (featuring Pierre and Tibarrus)
