= Criminal Manne =

American rapper

- Born: August 7, 1976 (age 50)
- Origin: Memphis, Tennessee, U.S.
- Genre: Hip hop
- Occupation: Rapper
- Years active: 1993–present
- Labels: Money and the Power; Select-O-Hits; Relativity; Rap-A-Lot; IMG
- Formerly of: The Project Playaz

Vanda L. Watkins (born August 7, 1976), known professionally as Criminal Manne, is an American rapper and actor from Tennessee. He is a former member of the Memphis-based hip hop trio the Project Playaz. As a solo artist, his second album, Street Ways (2005) peaked at number 97 on the Billboard's Top R&B/Hip-Hop Albums chart, followed by his collaborative album with Pastor Troy: Atlanta 2 Memphis (2006), which peaked at number 88. Criminal Manne has also starred in the films Da Neighborhood Dopemane and The Woods.

== Career ==
Watkins began his recording career with producer DJ Squeeky. Watkins first joined the Memphis-based hip hop trio Project Playaz, which consisted of Criminal Manne, Thugsta and Yo Lynch.

The group is known for their 1998 single, "Buck & Naked" and their second single, "Buck with Me" the following year, whose success led them to sign with Relativity Records. The song "Buck with Me" aired on BET's Rap City. Project Playaz then signed with Rap-A-Lot Records in 2000, although they parted ways with the label in 2002. Criminal Manne then pursued a solo career with his debut album, Playtime's Over (2002), which was released by Rap-A-Lot Records. He parted ways with Rap-A-Lot Records by 2003. In 2004, he collaborated with Yung Kee to release the single, "Tryna Buss Sumthing".

His second album, Street Ways followed in 2005 and climbed to number 97 on Billboard's Top R&B/Hip-Hop Albums chart, while his 2006 collaborative album, Atlanta 2 Memphis with Pastor Troy, peaked at number 88 on the chart. In 2007, Criminal Manne released the mixtape Da Neighborhood Dopeman, hosted by DJ Drama and The Aphiliates. A year later in 2008, Criminal Manne and hometown native Frayser Boy released the album The Takeover. In 2009, Manne released two additional albums titled Certified Dopeboy and Got Work. He followed up with Certified DopeBoy/The Re-Up in 2010. Blow and Blow 2 in 2011, followed by Blow 3 in 2012, Blow 3.5 in 2013 and finally The Come Up in 2014. The singles "Arm & Hammer", "Black Boston George", "Kings of The Trap", "I'm Tripping", and "Trap Talk" were released during and after this time frame.

== Discography ==
Independent mixtapes

- 1994: It's The Criminal Manne
- 1996: Criminal Manne
- 2002: Play Time's Over
- 2003: Neighborhood Dope Manne
- 2005: Street Ways
- 2009: Got Work
- 2016: Trap Talk
- 2013: Black Boston George
- 2017: Return of the Neighborhood Dopeman
- 2018: King Kong
- 2019: Underground King
- 2021: King Kong II
- 2022: Big Dawg
- 2023: Neighborhood Dope Mane
- 2024: RICH BROKE

=== Collaborations ===
- 2006: Atlanta 2 Memphis (with Pastor Troy)

=== Mixtapes ===
- 2007: Da Supplyer Mixtape
- 2007: Da Neighborhood Dopeman
- 2008: The Takeover (with Frayser Boy)
- 2009: Certified Dopeboy (hosted by DJ Scream)
- 2010: Certified Dopeboy 2: The Re-Up (hosted by DJ Scream)
- 2010: Certified Dopeboy Vol. 3: Supply & Demand (hosted by DJ 007)
- 2010: Certified Dopeboy Vol. 4
- 2010: Certified Dopeboy Vol. 5: The Cook Up
- 2011: Blow (hosted by Dj Scream & DJ 5150)
- 2011: Blow 2
- 2012: Blow 3
- 2013: Blow 3.5 Grams(hosted by Traps N Trunks & DJ Mic Tee)
- 2013: The Come Up
- 2014: Arm & Hammer
- 2014: Kings of the Trap (with OJ Da Juiceman) (hosted by DJ Scream
