= My Bubble Gum =

Single by Rasheeda

from the album GA Peach and Dat Type of Gurl
- B-side: "U Can Get It"
- Released: November 2006
- Genre: Dirty rap, southern hip-hop
- Length: 3:33 (album version)
- Label: D-Lo/Imperial
- Songwriters: K. Frost; R. Frost; S. Shann

Rasheeda singles chronology
"Like This" (2006)	"My Bubble Gum" (2006)	"Let It Go" (2009)

"My Bubble Gum" (alternatively titled "Got That Good (My Bubble Gum)") is a song by rapper Rasheeda released as the second single from her third album GA Peach and the first single from her fourth album Dat Type of Gurl.

The CD single for the song was released in November 2006 and the song was later released to iTunes as a digital download on May 22, 2007. By April 2007 the single had gained over 7,000 radio impressions in the US. The song is about cunnilingus, with "Bubble Gum" being a reference to her vulva.

== Title ==
Depending on the digital music service used to look for the song, the song can be found under the following names:

- "Got That Good"
- "My Bubble Gum"
- "(Got That Good) My Bubble Gum"

== Music video ==
The song's music video was shot in Grant Park in Atlanta, Georgia. It features Rasheeda dancing and features various scenes associated with bubble gum.

In June 2007, BET and other networks began rotation of the music video.

== Track listing ==
CD single

1. "Got That Good (My Bubble Gum)" (Album edit)
2. "Got That Good (My Bubble Gum)" (Radio edit)
3. "Got That Good (My Bubble Gum)" (Instrumental)
4. "Got That Good (My Bubble Gum)" (Remix) (featuring Fabo, Kandi Girl, Diamond and Princess of Crime Mob)

== Charts ==
Chart (2007)	Peak position
US Hot R&B/Hip-Hop Songs	55
US R&B/Hip-Hop Airplay	54

Chart (2025)	Position
R&B/Hip-Hop Digital Song Sales (Billboard)	4
Rap Digital Song Sales (Billboard)	4
Digital Song Sales (Billboard)	19

== Remixes ==
The song has a remix featuring Shawnna, Fabo, Kandi Girl, Diamond and Princess of Crime Mob. It appears as a bonus track on her album Dat Type of Gurl.

The song also has a remix by the DJ Whethan.

== Popular culture ==
The song featured in the 2009 film Paul Blart: Mall Cop, in which it was used as the main character's cell phone ringtone which prevented him from solving cases.
