= Still Writing in My Diary: 2nd Entry =

Studio album by Petey Pablo
- Released: May 4, 2004
- Genre: Southern hip-hop; crunk
- Length: 1:11:16
- Label: Jive
- Producer: Baby Dubb; Focus...; Honky Kong; Kanye West; Lil' Jon; Mannie Fresh; Petey Pablo; Q; Sholar; The Outfit; Timbaland; T&J Productions; Bangladesh; Scott Storch

Petey Pablo chronology
Diary of a Sinner: 1st Entry (2001)	Still Writing in My Diary: 2nd Entry (2004)

Singles from Still Writing in My Diary: 2nd Entry
- 1. "Blow Your Whistle" Released: September 28, 2003; 2. "Freek-a-Leek" Released: December 1, 2003; 3. "Vibrate" Released: July 17, 2004

Professional ratings
Review scores
Source	Rating
AllHipHop	3/5 stars
AllMusic	4/5 stars
HipHopDX	3/5
Los Angeles Times	3/4 stars
Prefix	6/10
RapReviews	7.5/10
Rolling Stone	3/5 stars
Stylus	C+
Vibe	3.5/5 stars

Still Writing in My Diary: 2nd Entry is the second studio album by American rapper Petey Pablo. It was released on May 4, 2004 via Jive Records. Production was handled by Lil' Jon, Timbaland, Baby Dubb, Focus..., Honky Kong, Kanye West, Mannie Fresh, Q, Sholar, The Outfit, T&J Productions, Bangladesh and Petey Pablo himself. It features guest appearances from Birdman, Bubba Sparxxx, Lil' Jon, Missy Elliott, TQ, Young Buck and Rasheeda.

The album debuted at number four on the Billboard 200 and number three on the Top R&B/Hip-Hop Albums charts with first-week sales of 117,000 copies in the United States. On June 28, 2004, it received gold certification by the Recording Industry Association of America for selling 500,000 unites in the US alone. Its popular single "Freek-a-Leek" peaked at number seven on the Billboard Hot 100.

== Track listing ==
No.	Title	Writer(s)	Producer(s)	Length
1.	"Part 2"	Moses Barrett III; Jonathan Williams	The Outfit	5:50
2.	"Did You Miss Me" (featuring Baby and TQ)	Barrett III; Bryan Williams; Terrance Quaites; Byron Thomas	Mannie Fresh	3:49
3.	"Jam Y'all"	Barrett III; Jonathan Smith; George Clinton; Dorian Hardnett	Lil' Jon	3:55
4.	"Freek-a-Leek"	Barrett III; Smith; Corey Evans	Lil' Jon	3:55
5.	"O It's On" (featuring Young Buck)	Barrett III; David Brown; Quincy Ledbetter	Q	4:36
6.	"Let's Roc"	Barrett III	Petey Pablo	4:18
7.	"Stick 'Em Up"	Barrett III	Petey Pablo	3:16
8.	"Get on Dis Motorcycle" (featuring Bubba Sparxxx)	Barrett III; Warren Anderson Mathis; Timothy Mosley; Scott Storch	Timbaland; Scott Storch	4:02
9.	"Break Me Off" (featuring Missy Elliott)	Barrett III; Melissa Elliott; Mosley; Clinton; Bernie Worrell; William Earl Collins	Timbaland	3:29
10.	"Boy's Bathroom"	Barrett III; Christopher Miranda; Joshua Alvarez; Bob Mosher; Jack Marshall	T&J Productions	4:22
11.	"U Don't Want Dat" (featuring Lil' Jon)	Barrett III; Smith	Lil' Jon	4:17
12.	"What You Know About It"	Barrett III; Josh Mirsky; Robert Lamm	Honky Kong	3:19
13.	"I Swear"	Barrett III; Kanye West	Kanye West	4:19
14.	"Roll Off"	Barrett III; Bernard Edwards Jr.	Focus...	4:25
15.	"Be Country"	Barrett III; Christopher Sholar	Chris Sholar	4:37
16.	"He Spoke to Me"	Barrett III; Warryn Campbell; Albert Greene; Mabon Hodges	Baby Dubb	4:53
17.	"Vibrate" (featuring Rasheeda) (Bonus Track)	Barrett III; Rasheeda Buckner; Shondrae Crawford; Kirk L. Frost	Bangladesh	3:54
Total length:				1:11:16

Sample credits

- Track 3 contains a portion of the composition "Get Off Your Ass and Jam".
- Track 9 contains a portion of the composition "P. Funk (Wants to Get Funked Up)".
- Track 10 contains a sample from "The Munsters TV Theme".
- Track 12 contains a sample from "25 or 6 to 4" as performed by Chicago.
- Track 16 contains a portion of the composition "Love and Happiness".

Notes

- Track 17 is a bonus track.

Leftover tracks

- "Blow Your Whistle" (produced by Mannie Fresh)
- "Whole Wide World" (featuring Missy Elliott)

== Charts ==
=== Weekly charts ===
Chart (2004)	Peak position
Canadian R&B Albums (Nielsen SoundScan)	24
US Billboard 200	4
US Top R&B/Hip-Hop Albums (Billboard)	3
US Top Rap Albums (Billboard)	6

=== Year-end charts ===
Chart (2004)	Position
US Billboard 200	124
US Top R&B/Hip-Hop Albums (Billboard)	43

== Certifications ==
Region	Certification	Certified units/sales
United States (RIAA)	Gold	500,000^{^}
^{^} Shipments figures based on certification alone.
