= Raise Up =

Single by Petey Pablo

from the album Diary of a Sinner: 1st Entry
- Released: May 29, 2001
- Recorded: 1999
- Genre: Hip hop; Southern hip hop; crunk
- Length: 4:38 (Original Version); 3:57 (All Cities Remix); 4:01 (Radio Version)
- Label: Jive
- Songwriters: Moses Barrett; Timothy Mosley
- Producer: Timbaland

Petey Pablo singles chronology
"Raise Up" (2001)	"I Told Y'all" (2001)

Music video
- "Raise Up" on YouTube

"Raise Up" is a song recorded by American rapper Petey Pablo. It was released in August 2001 as the lead single from his debut album Diary of a Sinner: 1st Entry. The song peaked at number 25 on the US Billboard Hot 100 chart in October 2001. The song was certified Gold by the Recording Industry Association of America in 2002. The music video was directed by Jessy Terrero.

== Content ==
The premise of the song "Raise Up" is simple, Petey Pablo represents his native North Carolina, and calls on the audience to "take your shirt off, twist it 'round yo' hand, spin it like a helicopter." The first line in the first verse, "Who am I? Petey Pab' motherfucker!", is an allusion to Beenie Man's dancehall single, "Who Am I (Sim Simma)".

The song samples "Enta Omri" by Hossam Ramzy.

According to Petey Pablo, the premise of the song to the outside listener is simple in the nature that North Carolina towns are being named. "Each town name in the song is a location for a NC prison," stated Pablo.

At UNC football games, The Marching Tar Heels play the chorus of this song after the defense makes a third down stop. In 2018, the Carolina Hurricanes made the song the team's official goal song.

"Raise Up" was the song that played while the North Carolina delegates announced the state's votes for Kamala Harris at the 2024 Democratic National Convention.

== Remixes ==
On the album, there is a remix called "Raise Up (All Cities remix)" which is similar to the original, starting off with North Carolina, except that he shouts out other cities, states or regions in this order: South Carolina, Atlanta, Virginia, New York City, New Jersey, Philadelphia, Washington, D.C., Maryland, Houston, Dallas, New Orleans, St. Louis, Miami, Los Angeles, Chicago, Las Vegas and San Francisco Bay Area, ending with "the whole world baby!". Some radio stations played the "All Cities remix" instead of the original. Local radio stations also commissioned their own remixes using localities in the service area.

Following the September 11 attacks in 2001, Pablo also released a USA-themed remix, dedicated to those who lost their lives in the attacks, as well as survivors.

== Charts ==
=== Weekly charts ===
Chart (2001)	Peak position
US Billboard Hot 100	25
US Hot R&B/Hip-Hop Songs (Billboard)	9
US Hot Rap Songs (Billboard)	1
US Rhythmic Airplay (Billboard)	7

=== Year-end charts ===
Chart (2001)	Position
US Hot R&B/Hip-Hop Songs (Billboard)	61
