= Diary of a Sinner: 1st Entry =

Studio album by Petey Pablo
- Released: November 6, 2001
- Recorded: 2000–2001
- Genres: Hip hop; Southern hip hop; crunk
- Label: Jive
- Producers: Chuckie Madness; Timbaland; Punch; Petey Pablo; Huck-A-Buck; Buddah; Shamello; Eric Sadler; Abnes Dubose; Eddie Hustle

Petey Pablo chronology
Diary of a Sinner: 1st Entry (2001)	Still Writing in My Diary: 2nd Entry (2004)

Singles from Diary of a Sinner: 1st Entry
- 1. "Raise Up" Released: May 29, 2001; 2. "I" Released: February 2002

Professional ratings
Review scores
Source	Rating
AllMusic	3/5 stars
Entertainment Weekly	B+
HipHopDX	3/5 stars
RapReviews	(6/10)
Robert Christgau	(2-star Honorable Mention)
Rolling Stone	3.5/5 stars
USA Today	3/4 stars

Diary of a Sinner: 1st Entry is the debut studio album by American rapper Petey Pablo, released on November 6, 2001. The album debuted at number 13 on the Billboard 200 chart with first-week sales of 103,000 copies in the US and was certified Gold by the RIAA. It was nominated for Best Rap Album at the 45th Annual Grammy Awards, but lost to Eminem's album The Eminem Show.

The lead single, "Raise Up", made it to No. 25 on the Hot 100. There is a remix called "Raise Up [All Cities remix]" which is similar to the original, starting off with North Carolina, except that he shouts out other cities such as New Orleans, Las Vegas, New York City, Los Angeles, etc.

== Track listing ==
Credits adapted from the album's liner notes.

No.	Title	Writer(s)	Producer(s)	Length
1.	"Intro"			1:21
2.	"Petey Pablo"	Moses Barrett III; Charles Shaw	Chuckie Madness	3:05
3.	"Raise Up"	Barrett III; Timothy Mosley	Timbaland	4:39
4.	"I"	Barrett III; Mosley	Timbaland	4:48
5.	"I Told Y'all"	Barrett III; Mosley	Timbaland	4:16
6.	"Didn't I"	Barrett III; Shaw	Chuckie Madness	4:49
7.	"La Di Da Da Da"	Barrett III; Michael Harper	Punch	3:33
8.	"Funroom"	Barrett III	Petey Pablo	3:59
9.	"Y'all Ain't Ready (Come On)"	Barrett III	Huck-A-Buck; Petey Pablo^{[a]}; Brian Stanley^{[a]}	3:23
10.	"Do Dat"	Barrett III; Darrol Durant; Roger Munroe	Buddah; Shamello	4:42
11.	"Live Debaco"	Barrett III; Durant; Munroe; José Areas; David Brown; Michael Carabello; Gregg Rolie; Carlos Santana; Michael Shrieve	Buddah; Shamello	3:09
12.	"919"	Barrett III; Abnes Dubose; Eric Sadler	Abnes "Abonrmal" Dubose; Eric "Vietnam" Sadler; Buddah^{[a]}; Shamello^{[a]}	4:01
13.	"Fool for Love"	Barrett III; Durant; Munroe; Lance Quinn; Brad Baker	Buddah; Shamello	5:29
14.	"Test of My Faith"	Barrett III; Shaw; Louise Bishop; Bunny Sigler	Chuckie Madness	4:14
15.	"Truth About Me"	Barrett III; Shaw	Chuckie Madness	4:23
16.	"Diary of a Sinner" (featuring Tre Williams)	Barrett III; Eddie Hustle; S.R. Williams	Eddie Hustle; Power^{[a]}	4:25
17.	"My Testimony"	Barrett III		2:46
18.	"Raise Up" (All Cities Remix)	Barrett III; Mosley	Timbaland	3:57

Notes

- ^{^[a]} signifies a co-producer

Sample credits

- "Live Debaco" contains a sample from "You Just Don't Care", written by José Areas, David Brown, Michael Carabello, Gregg Rolie, Carlos Santana, and Michael Shrieve, as performed by Santana.
- "Fool For Love" contains a sample from "A Trip to the Stars", written by Lance Quinn and Brad Baker, as performed by Jimmy Ponder.
- "Test of My Faith" contains a sample from "You and Me (We Can Make It Last)", written by Louise Bishop and Bunny Sigler, as performed by The O'Jays.
- "Raise Up" contains a sample from "Enta Omri" by Hossam Ramzy.

== Charts ==
=== Weekly charts ===
Chart (2001)	Peak position
US Billboard 200	13
US Top R&B/Hip-Hop Albums (Billboard)	7

=== Year-end charts ===
Chart (2002)	Position
US Billboard 200	121
US Top R&B/Hip-Hop Albums (Billboard)	61

== Certifications ==
Region	Certification	Certified units/sales
United States (RIAA)	Gold	500,000^{^}
^{^} Shipments figures based on certification alone.
