= Face Off (Pastor Troy album) =

Studio album by Pastor Troy
- Released: May 22, 2001
- Recorded: 2000–2001
- Genre: Southern hip hop; gangsta rap
- Length: 58:46
- Label: Madd Society Records; Universal Records
- Producer: Pastor Troy (also exec.); Benny "DaDa" Tillman; Big Toombs; Carl Mo; Carlos "Los Vagez" Thornton; Gene Griffin; Paul Wright

Pastor Troy chronology
Pastor Troy for President (2000)	Face Off (2001)	Hell 2 Pay (2002)

Singles from Face Off
- 1. "This Tha City" Released: February 4, 2001; 2. "Vica Versa" Released: June 1, 2001

Professional ratings
Review scores
Source	Rating
AllMusic	2.5/5 stars
The Source	3/5 stars

Face Off is the fourth studio album by American rapper and producer Pastor Troy. It was released on May 22, 2001 through Madd Society/Universal Records. Production was handled by Carl Mo, Big Toombs, Benny "DaDa" Tillman, Carlos "Los Vagez" Thornton, Gene Griffin, Paul Wright, and Pastor Troy himself. It features guest appearances from Co-Ed, Nature Boy and Lil Pete. The album peaked at number 83 on the Billboard 200 in the United States.

== Track listing ==
No.	Title	Writer(s)	Producer(s)	Length
1.	"Face Off - Intro"	Micah Troy	Pastor Troy	0:52
2.	"This tha City"	Troy	Pastor Troy	4:32
3.	"Frame Me"	Troy; Carl Mahone	Carl Mo	5:16
4.	"My Niggaz Is the Grind" (featuring Nature Boy)	Troy; Yizar Rainwater	Pastor Troy	3:54
5.	"Move to Mars"	Troy	Pastor Troy	5:48
6.	"I'm Made"	Troy; Mahone	Carl Mo	4:23
7.	"Can You Stand the Game" (featuring Co-Ed)	Troy	Benny "DaDa" Tillman; Carlos "Los Vagez" Thornton	4:18
8.	"Throw Your Flags Up"	Troy	Pastor Troy	4:04
9.	"Vica Versa" (featuring Peter the Disciple)	Troy; Mahone	Carl Mo	4:23
10.	"No Mo Play in G.A."	Troy	Pastor Troy	4:39
11.	"Rhonda"	Troy; Gene Griffin; Paul Wright; B. Toombs	Gene Griffin; Paul Wright; Big Toombs	4:25
12.	"Eternal Yard Dash"	Troy; B. Toombs	Pastor Troy; Big Toombs	4:11
13.	"Prayer"	Troy	Pastor Troy	0:18
14.	"Oh Father"	Troy	Pastor Troy	5:45
Total length:				58:46

Notes

- Tracks 10–12 were previously released on Pastor Troy's 1999 album We Ready (I Declare War).
- Tracks 3–5, 8, 13–14 were previously released on Pastor Troy's 2000 album I Am D.S.G.B..

== Personnel ==
- Micah Troy – main artist, producer (tracks: 2, 4, 5, 8–10, 12–14), executive producer
- Yizar "Nature Boy" Rainwater – featured artist (track 4)
- Co-Ed – featured artists (track 7)
- Lil Pete – featured artist (track 9)
- Tony Love – guitar (tracks: 2, 8)
- Dale "Rambro" Ramsey – ProTools, recording (track 1), mixing (tracks: 2, 6, 7)
- Carl Mahone Jr. – producer (tracks: 3, 6, 9)
- Benny "DaDa" Tillman – producer (track 7)
- Carlos "Los Vagez" Thornton – producer (track 7)
- Big Toombs – producer (tracks: 11, 12)
- Gene Griffin – producer (track 11)
- Paul Wright – producer (track 11)
- Ismel "Nino" Ramos – recording (tracks: 2, 3, 6, 7)
- Khali Fani – recording (tracks: 4, 5, 8, 9, 13, 14)
- Mike Wilson – recording (tracks: 3, 6, 7), mixing (tracks: 3–5, 8–10, 12–14)
- Sol Messiah – recording (tracks: 4, 5, 8, 9, 13, 14)
- Chris Athens – mastering
- Sandy Brummels – art direction
- Robert Sims – design
- Jonathan Mannion – photography
- Eloise Bryan – A&R
- Marcus Smith – A&R
- Jeya Larkins – A&R
- Elaine Lee – A&R
- Chris Lighty – management

== Charts ==
Chart (2001)	Peak position
US Billboard 200	83
US Top R&B/Hip-Hop Albums (Billboard)	13
