= Rasheeda =

American rapper

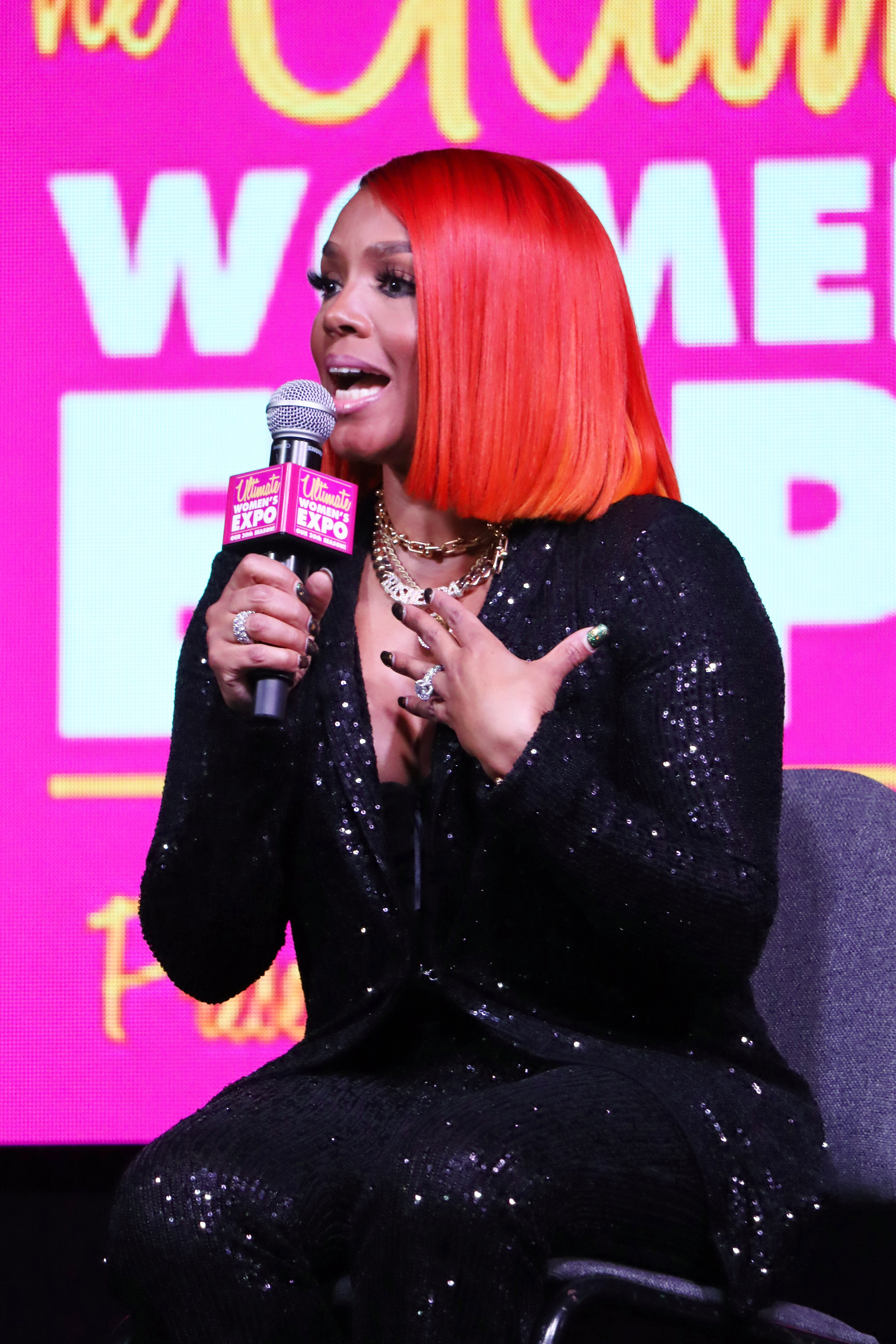
- Rasheeda in 2022
- Born: Decatur, Illinois
- Occupations: Businesswoman; reality television personality
- Years active: 1998–present
- Spouse: Kirk Frost (m. 1999)
- Children: 2
- Musical career
- Origin: Atlanta, Georgia, U.S.
- Genres: Hip hop; crunk; snap; southern hip-hop
- Labels: D-Lo; Motown; JIVE; Imperial

Rasheeda Buckner-Frost (often stylized as RaSheeda) is an American businesswoman, rapper, and television personality.

== Music career ==
=== Music beginnings ===
Born in Decatur, Illinois, Rasheeda moved to Atlanta at 14 and later graduated from North Clayton High School. Soon after graduation, she started her music career as a member of the female hip-hop trio Da Kaperz, which received attention in Atlanta in 1998. In 2000, she launched her solo career.

=== 2001–2004: Dirty South and A Ghetto Dream ===
On March 27, 2001, she released her album Dirty South, through D-Lo & Motown Records. The album featured guest appearances from Pastor Troy, Thugz Nation, Nelly & Re-Re. The album achieved some notoriety, due to the success of her first single "Do It". Dirty South would place Rasheeda firmly in the southern hip-hop genre. Rasheeda further refined her sound with her second album, 2002's A Ghetto Dream, an independent release under her label D-Lo after leaving Motown Records. A Ghetto Dream features faster rhythms, bolder beats, and assistance from Lil' Jon and the Eastside Boyz. In 2004, Rasheeda was featured on Petey Pablo's single "Vibrate" and Nivea's single "You Like It Like That".

=== 2007–2009: Dat Type of Gurl and Certified Hot Chick ===
On June 19, 2007, Rasheeda released her fourth album, Dat Type of Gurl. The album gained much success due to the success of her first single from the album "Got That Good (My Bubble Gum)", originally featured on GA Peach. Rasheeda reprised some of her earlier works from GA Peach, and many of her old tracks were updated with remixes and samples. In 2007, Rasheeda was featured on Mims single "Like This". Around this time, she formed a hip hop/R&B duo Peach Candy with R&B singer-songwriter Kandi Burruss. In the summer of 2009, D-Lo Entertainment partnered with independent record label Block Starz Music to release Rasheeda's debut mixtape Certified. On August 18, 2009, Rasheeda released her fifth album Certified Hot Chick. She later started releasing her Boss Bitch Music series mixtapes.

=== 2012–present: Boss Chick Music ===
On June 18, 2012, she released her sixth album Boss Chick Music, which was released through Block Starz Music/Google Play and her label D-Lo Entertainment, and promoted on the tenth season of Bad Girls Club: Atlanta and Love & Hip Hop: Atlanta. Her first single from the album was entitled "Marry Me" and her second single was "Legs to the Moon", both of which were followed by a music video. In 2013, during the second season of Love & Hip Hop: Atlanta, Rasheeda shot a music video for "Hit It From The Back". In 2015, Rasheeda released a new song on the fourth season of Love & Hip Hop: Atlanta titled, "I Meant It", reporting that the album for the song could be her final release.

== Other ventures ==
In 2012, Rasheeda and her husband Kirk Frost began appearing on VH1's Love & Hip Hop: Atlanta. In 2015, Rasheeda acted in the third episode of Fox's Rosewood, playing a character called Scrumptious. She now has her own make up line, Poiz Cosmetics, and an apparel and accessory website, Imbossy.com. Her store, Pressed Boutique in Phipp's Plaza in Atlanta, opened June 2015. A second Pressed Boutique in Houston opened in March 2018.

== Personal life ==
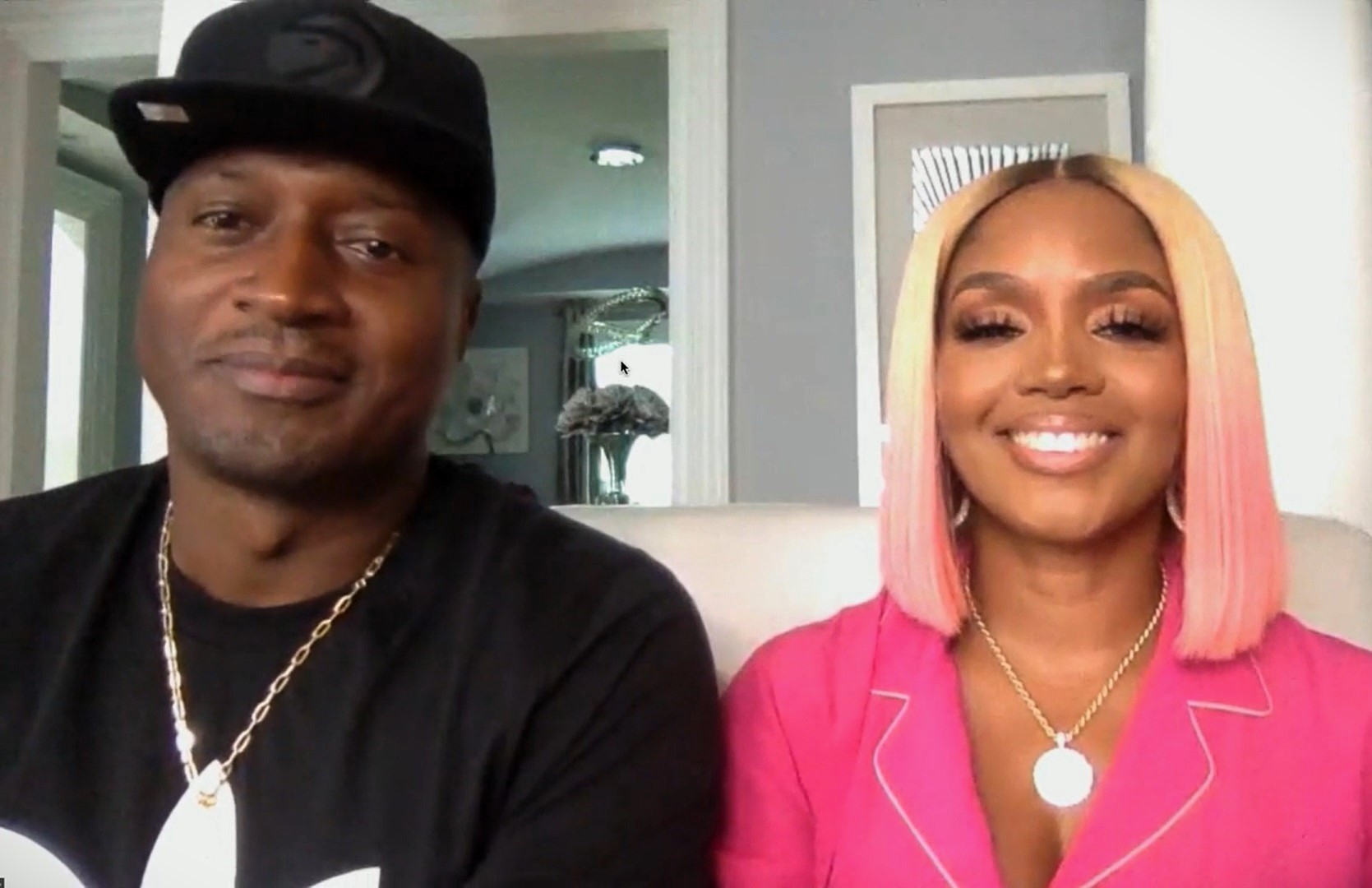
Kirk Frost and Rasheeda interviewed in 2021

In 1999, Rasheeda married Kirk Frost of D-Lo Entertainment, with whom she has two sons, born in 2000 and 2013. As a series regular on Love & Hip-Hop: Atlanta, Rasheeda's career, business ventures, and personal life, including marriage with Kirk, are documented.

== Discography ==
Studio albums

- Dirty South (2001)
- A Ghetto Dream (2002)
- GA Peach (2006)
- Dat Type of Gurl (2007)
- Certified Hot Chick (2009)
- Boss Chick Music (2012)

== Filmography ==
=== Television ===
Year	Title	Role	Notes
2009, 2020	The Real Housewives of Atlanta	Herself	Guest, episode:"Kim-intervation", "A Star Is Born"
2012–2026	Love & Hip Hop: Atlanta	Herself	Main cast
2014	Kandi's Wedding	Herself	Guest appearances
2015	Love & Hip Hop Live: The Wedding	Herself	Attendee
2015	Rosewood	Scrumptious	Guest role
