= Pastor Troy =

American rapper (born 1977)

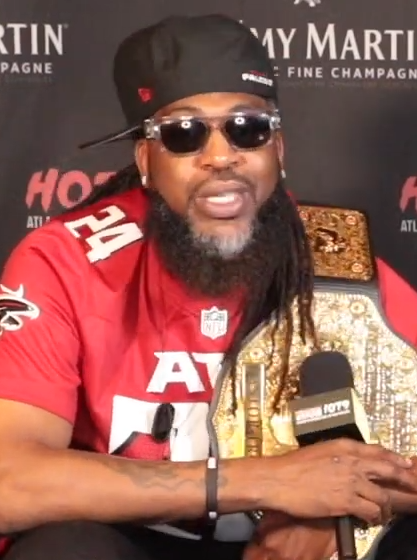
- Troy in 2023

Background information
- Also known as: The Pastor; PT Cruiser; Pastor Dizasta
- Born: Micah LeVar Troy; November 18, 1977 (age 49); Atlanta, Georgia, U.S.
- Origin: Augusta, Georgia, U.S.
- Genre: Southern hip-hop
- Occupations: Rapper; record producer
- Years active: 1998–present
- Labels: SMC; Real Talk; Koch; Universal Records

Micah LeVar Troy (born November 18, 1977), known professionally as Pastor Troy, is an American rapper from Augusta, Georgia. He is best known for his 2002 single "Are We Cuttin'" (featuring Ms. Jade), which entered the Billboard Hot 100. The year prior, he signed with Universal Records to release his fourth album and major label debut, Face Off (2001), which entered the Billboard 200. "Are We Cuttin'" spawned from his sixth album, Universal Soldier (2002), which peaked at number 13 on the chart. His seventh, By Any Means Necessary (2004), served as his final release with the label.

Along with his solo career, he was the lead member of the Southern hip hop group D.S.G.B. (Down South Georgia Boyz).

== Early life ==
Micah LeVar Troy was born on November 18, 1977, in Atlanta, Georgia. His father, Alfred Troy, is a former drill instructor turned pastor.

Troy graduated from Creekside High School and attended Paine College in Augusta, Georgia, before deciding to fully pursue his career in rap. His rap name comes from his last name and his father's profession as a pastor, and is also a pun on the name Castor Troy, a character from John Woo's 1997 film Face/Off, played by Nicolas Cage and John Travolta. His fourth album is titled Face Off in reference to the movie.

== Career ==
He released his first album, We Ready (I Declare War), in 1999. To generate attention and buzz, he attacked record producer Master P verbally on the song "No Mo Play in G. A."

Fellow Georgia-based rapper Ludacris enlisted Troy to appear on his Jermaine Dupri-produced song "Get Off Me", from the former's Def Jam Recordings debut, Back for the First Time. Troy also formed the Augusta, Georgia-based hip hop group D.S.G.B. (Down South Georgia Boyz) during this time, for which he served as frontman. He guest appeared on Lil Jon & the Eastside Boyz' song "Throw It Up", from their collaborative album Kings of Crunk (2002). In 2002, Troy's album Universal Soldier became popular in the South; it spawned the single "Are We Cuttin'" featuring Ms. Jade, which was also featured on the soundtrack for the action film xXx, released that year. The album debuted at number 13 on the Billboard 200. In 2003, Troy appeared on Young Jeezy's 2003 album Come Shop wit' Me on the track titled "GA".

Troy released By Any Means Necessary in 2004. Following this album, Troy was released from his Universal contract due to creative disputes. He then released Face Off, Part II, which addressed some issues with Lil Scrappy and BME. In 2005, he appeared with Killer Mike on Chamillionaire's track "Southern Takeover" off of The Sound of Revenge.

He released three albums in 2006, starting with Stay Tru, followed by By Choice or By Force and Atlanta 2 Memphis, the latter on which in collaboration with Memphis, Tennessee, rapper Criminal Manne. Stay Tru entered the Billboard 200 at number 150, selling 6,000 copies its first week.

Troy released his sixteenth solo album, Ready for War, in June 2009, and released seven follow-up studio albums until 2011. In 2012, he released The Last OutLaw, and in 2013, he released The Streets Need You. In 2014, he released the mixtape Crown Royal Part 4, as well as the album Welcome to the Rap Game, while he released the sixth installment of his Crown Royal mixtape series in 2015, along with WAR (We Are Ready) in Atlanta, which featured Paul Wall and Bun B.

In 2017, Troy announced his retirement, and released his last album O.G.P.T in July of that year. He also announced he was in the process of completing his second film, titled Down 2 Come Up, which he wrote, directed, and starred in, which was slated for released on March 17, 2020. Despite announcing his retirement, his career continued with the release of two albums: Clubber Lang (2018) and Enemy of the State (2019).

== Personal life ==
In January 2020, Pastor Troy made homophobic comments on the outfit Lil Nas X wore during the Grammy Awards. In a subsequent interview, Pastor Troy said he was not being homophobic but then claimed that "being gay isn't right" and made several other homophobic comments.

== Awards ==
On April 5, 2016, Pastor Troy received the Legends of ATL Award from BMI for his contributions to music in Atlanta.

== Discography ==
=== Studio albums ===
List of albums, with selected chart positions
Title	Album details	Peak chart positions			
Title	Album details	US	R&B	Rap	Ind
We Ready (I Declare War)	Released: March 16, 1999; Label: Madd Society Records/Candy Coated Management	—	—	—	—
I Am D.S.G.B.	Released: September 12, 2000; Label: MCA Records	—	—	—	—
Pastor Troy for President	Released: November 7, 2000; Label: Real Thang Records	—	—	—	—
Face Off	Released: May 22, 2001; Label: Madd Society Records/Universal	83	13	—	—
Hell 2 Pay	Released: January 1, 2002; Label: Madd Society Records	—	—	—	—
Universal Soldier	Releases: September 24, 2002; Label: Universal	13	2	—	—
By Any Means Necessary	Released: March 23, 2004; Label: Universal/Khaotic Generation	30	7	—	—
Face Off, Part II	Released: March 1, 2005; Label: Money & Power Records	112	—	—	—
Stay Tru	Released: April 18, 2006; Label: SMC Recordings, 845 Entertainment	150	21	12	15
By Choice or by Force	Released: July 25, 2006; Label: Koch Records/Money And The Power LLC/Fastlife	130	—	—	—
Tool Muziq	Releases: July 3, 2007; Label: SMC Recordings/Money And The Power Records	91	11	4	9
Attitude Adjuster	Releases: February 19, 2008; Label: Real Talk Entertainment	116	15	4	14
A.T.L. (A-Town Legend)	Released: May 13, 2008; Label: Siccness Records	—	—	—	—
TROY	Released: November 18, 2008; Label: Madd Society Records	—	—	—	—
Feel Me or Kill Me	Released: April 14, 2009; Label: SMC Recordings/Money And The Power Records/Fontana Distribution	121	—	—	—
Ready for War	Released: June 9, 2009; Label: Real Talk Entertainment	—	—	—	—
Love Me, Hate Me	Released: July 28, 2009; Label: Siccness Records	—	—	—	—
G.I. Troy – Strictly 4 My Soldiers	Released: February 16, 2010; Label: Madd Society Records	—	—	—	—
Zero Tolerence	Released: May 25, 2010; Label: Bcd Music Group	—	—	—	—
Attitude Adjuster 2	Released: June 15, 2010; Label: Real Talk Entertainment	—	—	—	—
King of All Kings	Released: August 3, 2010; Label: Madd Society Records	—	—	—	—
Still Troy	Released: March 15, 2011; Label: Turned Up Ent	—	—	—	—
H.N.I.C.	Released: April 5, 2011; Label: Siccness Records	—	—	—	—
The Last Outlaw	Released: June 19, 2012; Label: Madd Society Records	—	—	—	—
The Streets Need You	Released: July 30, 2013; Label: Madd Society Records	—	—	—	—
Welcome to the Rap Game	Released: October 7, 2014; Label: Madd Society Records	—	—	—	—
WAR in Atlanta	Released: June 27, 2015; Label: Khaotic Generation	—	—	—	—
O.G.P.T	Released: July 28, 2017; Label: Madd Society Records	—	—	—	—
Clubber Lang	Released: September 28, 2018; Label: Madd Society Records	—	—	—	—
Enemy of the State	Released: September 13, 2019; Label: Madd Society Records	—	—	—	—
I Said What I Said	Released: April 10, 2020; Label: Madd Society Records	—	—	—	—
PT Cruzza	Released: May 31, 2021; Label: Madd Society Records	—	—	—	—

=== Collaborations ===
With D.S.G.B.

Year	Title	Chart positions	
Year	Title	US	US R&B
2001	The Last Supper	—	—
2003	Til' Death Do Us Part	—	42

Other collaborations

Year	Title	Chart positions	
Year	Title	US	US R&B
2000	Book I (with The Congregation)	—	—
2006	Atlanta 2 Memphis (with Criminal Manne)	—	88
2008	A.T.L. 2 (A-Town Legends 2) (with The Lumberjacks)	—	—

=== Mixtapes, compilations and remix albums ===
Year	Album
2001	A Thin Line Between the Playaz and the Hataz
2002	Revelations
2004	I Am American (Compilation) (presented by Lil Jon & Pastor Troy)
2005	Hood Hustlin': The Mix Tape, Vol. 1 (with Nino of P.K.O.)
2005	Hood Hustlin': The Mix Tape, Vol. 2 (Slowed & Chopped) (with Nino of P.K.O.)
2006	Down South Hood Hustlin (with Nino of P.K.O.)
2009	Still No Play in Georgia (Best Of) (Mixtape)
2009	Ready for War (The P.T. Mixes)
2010	Crown Royal (Mixtape)
2010	The Be
2011	Crown Royal 2 (Mixtape)
2013	Crown Royal Legend (Mixtape)
2014	Crown Royal 4 (Mixtape)
2014	Crown Royal 5 (Mixtape)
2015	Crown Royal 6 (Mixtape)

=== Singles ===
Year	Song	U.S. Hot 100	U.S. R&B	Album
1999	"No Mo Play in G.A."	—	—	We Ready (I Declare War)
2001	"This tha City"	—	—	Face Off
2001	"Vice Versa" (featuring Peter the Disciple)	—	13	Face Off
2002	"Are We Cuttin'" (featuring Ms. Jade)	96	47	Universal Soldier
2003	"You Can't Pimp Me" (featuring Peter the Disciple)	—	—	Universal Soldier
2004	"Ridin' Big"	—	91	By Any Means Necessary
2006	"Pop a Few Bottles" (featuring Rasheeda)	—	—	By Choice or by Force
2007	"Saddam"	—	—	Tool Muziq
2008	"Heaven Is Below"	—	—	A.T.L. (A-Town Legend)
2009	"I Want War"	—	—	Feel Me or Kill Me
2009	"Comin wit Me"	—	—	Ready for War
2011	"Dirty Atlanta" (featuring Ralph)	—	—	Still Troy
2011	"Ain't Gangsta No Moe"	—	—	Still Troy

=== Collaboration singles ===
Year	Song	U.S. Hot 100	U.S. R&B	Album
2003	"D.S.G.B." (with D.S.G.B.; Down South Georgia Boyz)	—	—	Til' Death Do Us Part
2014	"We Represent Dat" (with Lil Jazz)	—	—	Non-album single
2016	"Money Up" (with King Killumbia & Lil Ru)	—	—	Welcome to Killumbia
2018	"Hoe Check II prod by Chill Go Hard of Street Execs" (with Devin Patrick, Project Pat, The Last Mr. Bigg, Mr. Flip & Natalac; Remix with Lil Brod)	—	—	Pimp of the Nation
2018	"Roll Down" (with Dusty Roadz & King Killumbia)	—	—	Kranked Up
2018	"IDGAF prod by Witeout" (with King Killumbia, Lil Wyte & Kaotik)	—	—	Non-album single

== Production credits ==
=== Pastor Troy ===
- Book I (by Pastor Troy & The Congregation):

"Havin' A Bad Day"

- Face Off:

"This Tha City"
"My Niggaz Is The Grind"
"Move To Mars"
"Throw Your Flags Up"
"No Mo Play In GA"
"Eternal Yard Dash" with Big Toombs
"Oh Father"

- Universal Soldier

"Universal Soldier"
"Bless America"

- Face Off (Part II):

"WWW (Who, Want, War)"
"Where Them Niggaz At"
"Respect Game"

- Tool Muziq:

"I'm Down"

=== D.S.G.B. ===
- The Last Supper:

"We Dem Georgia Boyz"
"My Folks"
"Brang Ya Army"
"Above The Law II"
"Southside"
"Repent"

- Til Death Do Us Part:

"I'm Outside Ho"
"Sittin' On Thangs" with Taj Mahal
