= Jim Jonsin production discography =

The following list is a discography of production by Jim Jonsin, an American hip hop, pop and R&B music producer from South Florida. It includes a list of songs produced, co-produced and remixed by year, artist, album and title.

== Singles produced ==
List of singles as either producer or co-producer, with selected chart positions and certifications, showing year released, performing artists and album name
Title	Year	Peak chart positions										Certifications	Album
Title	Year	US	US R&B	US Rap	AUS	CAN	GER	IRL	NZ	SWI	UK	Certifications	Album
"Let's Go" (Trick Daddy featuring Twista and Lil' Jon)	2004	7	10	4	35	—	—	27	—	—	26	RIAA: Gold	Thug Matrimony: Married to the Streets
"Dammit Man" (Pitbull)	2004	119	58	—	—	—	—	—	—	—	—		M.I.A.M.I.
"Grind With Me" (Pretty Ricky)	2005	7	6	2	—	—	—	—	6	—	26	RIAA: Platinum	Bluestars
"Your Body" (Pretty Ricky)	2005	12	22	5	45	—	—	—	13	—	37	RIAA: Gold	Bluestars
"Unpredictable" Jamie Foxx featuring Ludacris	2005	8	2	—	22	—	—	26	13	85	16	RIAA: Platinum	Unpredictable
"Show Stopper" (Danity Kane featuring Yung Joc)	2006	8	33	—	—	—	27	—	—	—	—	RIAA: Gold	Danity Kane
"Leather So Soft" (Birdman and Lil Wayne)	2006	118	41	16	—	—	—	—	—	—	—		Like Father, Like Son
"Lollipop" (Lil Wayne)	2008	1	1	1	32	10	22	28	3	39	26	RIAA: 5× Platinum; RMNZ: Platinum	Tha Carter III
"Whatever You Like" (T.I.)	2008	1	1	1	13	12	57	19	1	—	47	RIAA: 3× Platinum; RMNZ: Platinum	Paper Trail
"Kiss Me Thru the Phone" (Soulja Boy featuring Sammie)	2008	3	4	1	16	10	—	11	2	88	6		iSouljaBoyTellEm
"Sweet Dreams" (Beyoncé)	2009	10	48	—	2	17	8	4	1	16	5	RIAA: Platinum; ARIA: Platinum; BPI: Gold; RMNZ: Platinum	I Am… Sasha Fierce
"Hotel Room Service" (Pitbull)	2009	8	7	—	11	7	22	29	—	11	9	RIAA: Platinum; ARIA: Platinum; BPI: Silver; MC: 2× Platinum	Rebelution
"There Goes My Baby" (Usher)	2010	25	1	—	—	—	—	—	—	—	138		Raymond v. Raymond
"Just a Dream" (Nelly)	2010	3	—	6	3	5	17	8	5	22	8	RIAA: 3× Platinum; ARIA: 3× Platinum; BPI: Gold; IFPI SWE: Gold; IFPI SWI: Gold; RMNZ: Platinum	5.0
"Erase Me" (Kid Cudi featuring Kanye West)	2010	22	51	—	50	12	—	—	22	—	58	RIAA: Gold	Man on the Moon II: The Legend of Mr. Rager
"Girls" (N-Dubz)	2010	—	—	—	—	—	—	—	—	—	18		Love.Live.Life
"Space Bound" (Eminem)	2011	119	—	—	51	—	—	31	—	—	34	RIAA: Gold	Recovery
"On My Level" (Wiz Khalifa featuring Too Short)	2011	52	30	19	—	96	—	—	—	—	—	RIAA: Gold	Rolling Papers
"Motivation" (Kelly Rowland featuring Lil Wayne)	2011	17	1	—	—	99	—	—	—	—	169	RIAA: 2× Platinum	Here I Am
"Right There" (Nicole Scherzinger featuring 50 Cent)	2011	39	—	—	8	44	61	7	7	—	3	RIAA: Gold; BPI: Silver	Killer Love
"Mr. Wrong" (Mary J. Blige featuring Drake)	2011	87	10	—	—	—	—	—	—	—	—		My Life II... The Journey Continues (Act 1)
"No More" (LL Cool J featuring Ne-Yo)	2011	124	87	—	—	—	—	—	—	—	—		Non-album single
"Lemme See" (Usher featuring Rick Ross)	2012	46	2	—	—	—	—	—	—	—	90		Looking 4 Myself
"Pay Attention" (Big K.R.I.T. featuring Rico Love)	2014	—	—	—	—	—	—	—	—	—	—		Cadillactica
"L$D" (ASAP Rocky)	2015	62	20	—	83	90	—	—	—	—	—		At. Long. Last. ASAP
"Withdrawal" (Austin Mahone)	2023	—	—	—	—	—	—	—	—	—	—		A Lone Star Story
"—" denotes a recording that did not chart or was not released in that territory.

== 2000 ==
=== Outsidaz - Night Life ===
- 07. "Night Life"

== 2004 ==
=== Pitbull - M.I.A.M.I. ===
- 09. "Dammit Man" (featuring Piccalo)

=== Trick Daddy - Thug Matrimony: Married to the Streets ===
- 03. "Let's Go" (co-produced by Lil Jon, featuring Twista, Lil Jon)

== 2005 ==
=== Pretty Ricky - Bluestars ===
- 02. "Your Body"
- 03. "Grind On Me"
- 08. "Nothing But A Number"

=== Jamie Foxx - Unpredictable ===
- 01. "Unpredictable" (featuring Ludacris)

=== Trina - Glamorest Life ===
- 04. "Here We Go" (featuring Kelly Rowland)

=== Twista - The Day After ===
- 06. "Girl Tonite" (featuring Trey Songz)

=== Pitbull - Money Is Still a Major Issue ===
- 01. "Everybody Get Up" (featuring Pretty Ricky)

== 2006 ==
=== Danity Kane - Danity Kane ===
- 02. "Heartbreaker"
- 05. "Show Stopper" (featuring Yung Joc)

=== Lil Wayne & Birdman - Like Father, Like Son ===
- 12. "Leather So Soft"

=== Pitbull - El Mariel ===
- 14. "Hey You Girl"

=== Urban Mystic - Ghetto Revelations II ===
- 11. "Let's Make A Change" (featuring Trick Daddy) (produced with Bigg D)

== 2007 ==
=== Lil Wayne - The Drought Is Over 2 (The Carter 3 Sessions) ===
- 10. "I Feel Like Dying"
  - Sample Credit: Karma - "Once"

=== Baby Bash - Cyclone ===
- 10. "Na Na (The Yummy Song)" (featuring Casely)

=== Bow Wow & Omarion - Face Off ===
- 12. "Another Girl"

=== Birdman - 5 ★ Stunna ===
- 10. "All the Time"

== 2008 ==
=== B.o.B - Hi! My Name is B.o.B ===
- 05. "Lonely People" (produced with B.o.B)
- 17. "Don't Be Afraid" (produced with B.o.B)
- 20. "Do Anything" (produced with B.o.B)
- 23. "Use Ur Love"
- 27. "Sweet Home"
- 28. "Not Love" (produced with B.o.B)
- 35. "Middle of the Day"

=== Prima J - Prima J ===
- 03. "Tame"

=== Lil Wayne - Tha Carter III ===
- 12. "Lollipop" (co-produced by Deezle, featuring Static Major)

=== Michelle Williams - Unexpected ===
- 06. "The Greatest"

=== B.o.B - Who the F#*k is B.o.B? ===
- 16. "Lonely People" (produced with B.o.B)
- 17. "Use Ur Love" (produced with B.o.B)
- 20. "Starship Stobelight" (produced with B.o.B)

=== T.I. - Paper Trail ===
- 06. "Whatever You Like

=== Beyoncé - I Am... Sasha Fierce ===
- 02. "Radio"
- 04. "Sweet Dreams"
- 05. "Save The Hero"

=== Soulja Boy - iSouljaBoyTellEm ===
- 06. "Kiss Me Thru the Phone"

== 2009 ==
=== Westlife - Where We Are ===
- 02. "How to Break a Heart"

=== Slim Thug - Boss of All Bosses ===
- 03. "I Run"
- 05. "Smile"

=== Flo Rida - R.O.O.T.S. ===
- 04. "Shone"

=== Mims - Guilt ===
- 08. "Rock 'n Rollin" (featuring Tech N9ne)

=== Mike Jones - The Voice ===
- 05. "Cuddy Buddy" (featuring Trey Songz, Lil Wayne & Twista)

=== Fat Joe - Jealous Ones Still Envy 2 (J.O.S.E. 2) ===
- 07. "Porn Star" (featuring Lil' Kim)

=== Mario - D.N.A. ===
- 03. "Get Out"

=== Pitbull - Rebelution ===
- 08. "Hotel Room Service"
- 10. "Call Of The Wild
- 13. "Across The World" (featuring B.o.B)
- 16. "All About You"

=== Backstreet Boys - This Is Us ===
- 06. "This Is Us"
- 12. "Helpless" (featuring Pitbull)
- 13. "On Without You"
- "Lost in Space"

=== Alexandra Burke - Overcome ===
- 14. "All Night Long" (featuring Pitbull)

=== Amerie - In Love & War ===
- 08. "Swag Back"

=== Evident ===
- 00. "Single Girl"

=== Young Dro ===
- 00. "On Fire"

== 2010 ==
=== Trina - Amazin' ===
- 13. "Let Dem Hoes Fight" (featuring Kalenna Harper)

=== Usher - Raymond v. Raymond ===
- 03. "There Goes My Baby"
- 14. "Making Love (Into The Night)"

=== T.I. - Fuck A Mixtape ===
- 09. "Get Yo Girl" (featuring Rich Kid Shawty)

=== Cypress Hill - Rise Up ===
- 04. "Get It Anyway"
- 15. "Armada Latina" (featuring Pitbull & Marc Anthony)

=== Monica - Still Standing ===
- 06. "Mirror"

=== Eminem - Recovery ===
- 10. "Space Bound"

=== Kid Cudi - Man on the Moon II: The Legend of Mr. Rager ===
- 08. "Erase Me" (featuring Kanye West)

=== T.I. - No Mercy ===
- 13. "Lay Me Down" (featuring Rico Love)

=== Nelly - 5.0 ===
- 04. "Just a Dream"
- 08. "Gone" (featuring Kelly Rowland)
- 12. "Nothing Without Her"

=== N-Dubz - Love.Live.Life ===
- 11. "Girls"

=== Fantasia - Back to Me ===
- 10. "Falling in Love Tonight"

=== Gucci Mane - The Appeal: Georgia's Most Wanted ===
- 15. "Grown Man" (featuring Estelle)

=== B.o.B - No Genre ===
- 02. "So So"

== 2011 ==
=== Kelly Rowland - Here I Am ===
- 03. "Motivation" (featuring Lil Wayne)

=== Baby Bash - Bashtown ===
- 10. "Good for My Money" (featuring Lloyd)

=== Wiz Khalifa - Rolling Papers ===
- 2. "On My Level" (featuring Too Short)

=== Game - Hoodmorning (No Typo): Candy Coronas ===
- 00. "Rough" (featuring Yelawolf)

=== Game - The R.E.D. Album ===
- 00. "Better Days" (Leftover track)

=== Jagged Edge - The Remedy ===
- 04. "Flow Through My Veins"

=== Nicole Scherzinger - Killer Love ===
- 04. "Right There"

=== Mary J. Blige - My Life II... The Journey Continues (Act 1) ===
- 09. "Mr. Wrong" (featuring Drake)

=== Yelawolf - Radioactive ===
- 13. "Radio"

=== B.o.B - E.P.I.C. (Every Play Is Crucial) ===
- 04. "What Are We Doing"
- 14. "Friday Night Star"

=== Demrick - #HeadsUp ===
- 08. "BurnOut"

== 2012 ==
=== Brandy - Two Eleven ===
- 05. "No Such Thing as Too Late"

=== Usher - Looking 4 Myself ===
- 06. "Lemme See" (featuring Rick Ross)
- 08. "Dive" (co-produced with Rico Love, Frank Romano & Danny Morris)

=== Wiz Khalifa - O.N.I.F.C. ===
- 13. "Up in It" (co-produced with Earl & E, Rico Love)

== 2013 ==
=== ASAP Rocky - Long. Live. ASAP ===
- 01. "Long Live ASAP" (co-produced with Rico Love, Finatik & Zac, Frank Romano, LORD FLACKO)

=== LL Cool J - Authentic ===
Leftover

- 00. "No More" (featuring Ne-Yo)

=== Demrick - All the Wrong Things 2 ===
- 05. "Float" (co-produced with Finatik & Zac)
- 10. "Smoke"
- 11. "Perfect World"
- 13. "Runway"
- 16. "Smoke (Remix)" (featuring Cypress Hill)

=== Demrick – All the Wrong Things 2: Bonus Tracks ===
- 02. "Go Out and Get It" (co-produced with Finatik & Zac)
- 05. "I'll Be There" (co-produced with Finatik & Zac)

=== ASAP Ferg - Trap Lord ===
- 10. "Murda Something" (featuring Waka Flocka Flame) (co-produced with Rico Love, Finatik & Zac)

=== B.o.B - Underground Luxury ===
- 13. "Nobody Told Me" (produced with Finatik & Zac)

== 2014 ==
=== Kevin Gates - By Any Means ===
- 08. "Go Hard" (featuring Rico Love) (produced with Finatik & Zac)

=== Wiz Khalifa - Blacc Hollywood ===
- 03. "Promises"
- 04. "KK" (featuring Project Pat and Juicy J) (produced with Finatik & Zac)

=== Big K.R.I.T. - Cadillactica ===
- 06. "Pay Attention" (featuring Rico Love)

== 2015 ==
=== ASAP Rocky - At. Long. Last. ASAP ===
- 04. "L$D" (produced with Hector Delgado and Finatik N Zac)

== 2018 ==
=== Carrie Underwood - Cry Pretty ===
- 00. "The Champion" (featuring Ludacris)

== Upcoming ==
=== Esmee Denters - Screaming Out Loud ===
- 00. "Tonight" (featuring Matt Lennon)
