= Money Is Still a Major Issue =

Remix album by Pitbull
- Released: November 15, 2005
- Recorded: 2003–2005
- Genre: Hip hop; ragga hip hop; reggaeton
- Length: 54:57
- Label: TVT
- Producer: Diaz Brothers; Lil Jon; Supa Dups

Pitbull chronology
M.I.A.M.I. (2004)	Money Is Still a Major Issue (2005)	El Mariel (2006)

Singles from Money Is Still a Major Issue
- 1. "Everybody Get Up" Released: November 15, 2005

Professional ratings
Review scores
Source	Rating
AllMusic	4.5/5 stars
Okayplayer	2.5/5 stars
RapReviews	(6.5/10)

Money Is Still a Major Issue (backronym of M.I.S.A.M.I) is a remix album by rapper Pitbull. It was released on November 15, 2005, and features several of his guest appearances, remixes and some unreleased tracks.

== Track listing ==
No.	Title	Writer(s)	Producer(s)	Length
1.	"Everybody Get Up" (Pretty Ricky featuring Pitbull)	Diamond Smith; Joseph Smith; Spectacular Smith; Marcus Cooper; Corey Mathis; James Scheffer; Derrick Baker; Armando Pérez; John Robie; Emilio Innocenti	Jim Jonsin; Bigg D	4:49
2.	"Rah Rah" (Elephant Man featuring Pitbull & Daddy Yankee)	Pérez; Ramón Ayala; Richard Browne; O'Neil Bryan; Bobby Konders	Bobby Konders; Willie Daniels^{[a]}	3:51
3.	"Shake (Remix)" (Ying Yang Twins featuring Pitbull & Elephant Man)	Michael Crooms; Deongelo Holmes; Eric Jackson; Pjarro Scott; Pérez; Bryan; George Kranz	Mr. Collipark; Tom Slick	4:14
4.	"Culo (Remix)" (featuring Lil Jon & Ivy Queen)	Cordel Burrell; Clifford Smith; Jonathan Smith; Pérez; Martha Pesante	Lil Jon; The Diaz Brothers	4:00
5.	"Mil Amores" (Master Joe & O.G. Black featuring Pitbull)	Adolfo Ramírez; Joel Rodríguez; Pérez	Master Joe & O.G. Black; DJ EZ Beat^{[a]}	3:40
6.	"Turnin' Me On (Remix)" (Nina Sky featuring Pitbull)	Pérez; Nicole Albino; Natalie Albino; Dwayne Chin-Quee; Luis Diaz; David Shayman	DJ Cipha Sounds; Disco D; Dwayne "Supa Dups" Chin-Quee; Mitchum "Khan" Chin	4:10
7.	"She's Hotter" (T.O.K. featuring Pitbull)	Pérez; Christopher Birtch; Xavier Davidson; Roshaun Clarke; Alistaire McCalla; Craig Thompson	Christopher Birtch; Vada Nobles^{[b]}	4:15
8.	"Get to Poppin' (Remix)" (Rich Boy featuring Pitbull)	Brian Kidd; Marece Richards; Abeeku Ribeiro; Pérez	Brian Kidd	4:14
9.	"Might Be the Police" (Brisco featuring Pitbull)	Pérez; British Mitchell; Jean Borges	J-Roc	3:35
10.	"Who U Rollin' With" (featuring Piccallo & Cubo)	Pérez; Tavares Batten; Frank Roman; Ernst Dimanche	Tazz	4:25
11.	"Dammit Man (Remix)" (featuring Lil' Flip)	Pérez; Corellius Johnson; Laron Young; Scheffer; Wesley Weston	Jim Jonsin	3:47
12.	"Oh No He Didn't" (featuring Cubo)	Pérez; Thomas Simons; Winston Thomas; Roman	Thomas Simons; Winston Thomas	3:33
13.	"Toma (DJ Buddha Remix)" (featuring Lil Jon, Mr. Vegas, Wayne Marshall, Red Rat, T.O.K., & Kardinal Offishall)	Pérez; Jonathan Smith; Clifford Smith; Wayne Mitchell; Wallace Wilson; Clarke; Davidson; McCalla; Thompson; Jason Harrow	Lil Jon; DJ Buddha^{[a]}	6:25

Bonus DVD

1. "Culo" (Video)
2. "Dammit Man" (Video)
3. "Toma" (Video)
4. Live performances and interviews

Notes

- ^{^[a]} signifies a remixer
- ^{^[b]} signifies an additional producer

Sample credits

- "Everybody Get Up" contains an interpolation of "Body Mechanic", written by John Robie and Emilio Innocenti.
- "Shake" contains a sample of "Din Daa Daa", written and performed by George Kranz.
- "Culo" contains the rhythm "Coolie Dance Rhythm" written by Cordell "Scatta" Burell and Clifford Smith, and performed by Burell.

== Charts ==
=== Weekly charts ===
Chart (2005)	Peak position
US Billboard 200	25
US Top R&B/Hip-Hop Albums (Billboard)	4
US Top Rap Albums (Billboard)	2

=== Year-end charts ===
Chart (2006)	Position
US Top R&B/Hip-Hop Albums (Billboard)	73
