= Culo =

Culo may refer to:

- Čulo, a Croatian surname
- "Culo (song)", a song by rapper Pitbull from his 2004 album M.I.A.M.I..
- Culo (book), a coffee-table book by photographer Raphael Mazzucco
- Culo, a Spanish and Italian word for "ass"
