= Everybody Get Up =

Everybody Get Up may refer to:

- "Everybody Get Up" (Five song), 1998
- "Everybody Get Up" (Pitbull song), 2005
