= Marco Polo (Bow Wow song) =

Single by Bow Wow featuring Soulja Boy Tellem

from the album New Jack City II (Deluxe Edition)
- Released: July 15, 2008
- Recorded: 2008
- Genre: Pop rap, snap
- Length: 4:18 (single version)
- Label: Columbia
- Songwriters: S. Moss, D. Way
- Producer: Soulja Boy Tellem

Bow Wow singles chronology
"I'm Grown" (2008)	"Marco Polo" (2008)	"Big Girls" (2008)

Soulja Boy Tellem singles chronology
"Donk" (2008)	"Marco Polo" (2008)	"Bird Walk" (2008)

"Marco Polo" is a song by Bow Wow featuring Soulja Boy Tellem, released as a single from Bow Wow's 2008 album New Jack City II. The song was not included on the standard edition of the album, but was available as a Wal-Mart deluxe edition bonus track. The song features and was produced by Soulja Boy Tellem.

The album version of the song does not contain any explicit lyrics by Bow Wow. An earlier version leaked onto the internet that had a completely different first verse by Bow Wow did however contain explicit lyrics. Soulja Boy Tellem's verse on both versions is the same, except it is edited to not have the two explicit words at the end of his verse for the album version. Soulja Boy's line, "Gucci Bandanna" is sampled as the hook of his song, "Gucci Bandanna" from his second album, iSouljaBoyTellEm.

== Music video ==
The video begins with Bow Wow and Soulja Boy picking up trash near a pool with their boss, a lifeguard (portrayed by comedian Doo Doo Brown) giving them a hard time. They then proceed to call up some friends, and have a party by the pool doing the "Marco Polo" dance which is similar to Peekaboo.

== Canceled remix ==
Bow Wow announced a remix that would feature T-Pain, Lil Wayne, Twista, Busta Rhymes and Australian rapper Yung Zimmie via his "Say Now", but the remix never was released. Bow Wow then featured V.I.C. and Soulja Boy Tell 'Em for the official remix.

== Charts ==
Chart (2008)	Peak position
US Billboard Hot 100	66
US Hot R&B/Hip-Hop Songs (Billboard)	28
US Hot Rap Songs (Billboard)	22
