= Run This =

Run This may refer to:

- "Run This", a 2013 song by Thugli, directed by Amos Le Blanc and Ohji Inoue, the video of which won Director of the Year at the 2014 Much Music Video Awards
- "Run This", a 2018 song by Exo from Countdown

== See also ==
- I Run This
- We Run This
- Run This Town
