= Everybody Get Up (Pitbull song) =

Single by Pitbull featuring Pretty Ricky

from the album Money Is Still a Major Issue
- Released: November 15, 2005
- Genre: Southern hip hop
- Length: 4:48
- Label: TVT
- Songwriter(s): Corey Mathis; Armando Pérez; James Scheffer; Diamond Smith; Joseph S. Smith; Spectacular Smith; Southernblack
- Producer(s): Jim Jonsin; Lil Jon; Diaz Brothers

Pitbull singles chronology
"Hit the Floor" (2005)	"Everybody Get Up" (2005)	"Bojangles" (2006)

Pretty Ricky singles chronology
"Grind with Me" (2005)	"Everybody Get Up" (2005)	"Your Body" (2005)

Music video
- "Everybody Get Up " on YouTube

"Everybody Get Up" is the first single of rapper Pitbull's 2005 remix album Money Is Still a Major Issue featuring the R&B group Pretty Ricky. It was released on November 15, 2005.

== Music video ==
This music video was directed by Dr. Teeth. It premiered on BET’s 106 & Park on January 27, 2006.

== Track listing ==
1. "Everybody Get Up" (album version) – 4:48
