= Push It Baby =

"(I Wanna See You) Push It Baby"

Single by Pretty Ricky

from the album Late Night Special
- Released: March 2007
- Recorded: 2006
- Genre: R&B, hip hop
- Length: 3:26
- Label: Atlantic
- Songwriters: C. Deveaux;C. Mathis;D. Smith;D. Sternfield;J. Smith;M.H. Cooper;R. Young;S. Smith
- Producer: Music Royale

Pretty Ricky singles chronology
"On the Hotline" (2006)	"(I Wanna See You) Push It Baby" (2007)	"Love Like Honey" (2007)

"Push It Baby" is a single by American R&B quartet Pretty Ricky. It was released on March 1, 2007, as the second single from their second studio album Late Night Special (2007). The single was also featured in television network BET's 2007 Spring Bling event during their performance. Pretty Ricky has performed this song live on BET's video countdown show 106 & Park on May 16, 2007. The official remix features Sean Paul.

== Remix ==
A promotional CD was leaked onto the internet containing a remixed version of the song. This version featured Sean Paul, and is the version actually used in the video. It is the only "official" remix of the song.

== Charts ==
Chart (2007)	Peak position
Finland (Suomen virallinen lista)	2
Germany (GfK)	67
UK Hip Hop/R&B (Official Charts)	10
UK Singles (OCC)	120
US Bubbling Under Hot 100 (Billboard)	2
US Hot R&B/Hip-Hop Songs (Billboard)	51
US Hot Rap Songs (Billboard)	18
US Rhythmic Airplay (Billboard)	20
