= Back Up (Pitbull song) =

Single by Pitbull

from the album M.I.A.M.I.
- Released: December 22, 2004
- Recorded: 2004
- Genre: Hip house; crunk; Latin
- Length: 3:38
- Label: TVT
- Songwriters: Anthony Del Francisco; Hugo Diaz; Lu Diaz; Armando Christian Pérez
- Producers: DEL; Díaz Brothers

Pitbull singles chronology
"That's Nasty" (2004)	"Back Up" (2004)	"Toma" (2004)

"Back Up" is a song by American rapper Pitbull. It was released on December 22, 2004, as the third single from Pitbull's first studio album M.I.A.M.I.. The song was produced by DEL and the Díaz Brothers.

The song appears as a track in Fight Night Round 2.

== Charts ==
Chart performance for "Back Up"
Chart (2005)	Peak position
US Hot R&B/Hip-Hop Songs (Billboard)	86
US Rhythmic Airplay (Billboard)	20

== Release history ==
Release history and formats for "Back Up"
Region	Date	Format	Label
United States	August 3, 2004	Digital download	TVT
