= Pop Bottles =

Single by Birdman featuring Lil Wayne

from the album 5 * Stunna
- Released: June 15, 2007
- Recorded: 2006
- Genre: Hip hop
- Length: 4:04
- Label: Cash Money, Universal
- Songwriters: Bryan Williams, Dwayne Carter
- Producers: Steve Morales, Raymond "Sarom" Diaz

Birdman singles chronology
"We Takin' Over" (2007)	"Pop Bottles" (2007)	"100 Million" (2007)

Lil Wayne singles chronology
"Uh-Ohhh!" (2007)	"Pop Bottles" (2007)	"Sweetest Girl (Dollar Bill)" (2007)

"Pop Bottles" is the first single from Birdman's third studio album, 5 * Stunna. The track features rapper Lil Wayne. The track samples "Put Ya Hands Up" performed by Jadakiss from his 2001 album Kiss Tha Game Goodbye. The song has since sold over 3,690,000 copies.

In the music video for the song, Birdman and Lil Wayne are depicted playing basketball, in a video game entitled "Popping Bottles".

Young Money Entertainment's T-Streets and Mack Maine make cameos in the video along with Cash Money Records' All Star Cashville Prince and Brisco.

== Track listing ==
1. "Pop Bottles" (Remix) feat. Lil' Wayne & Jadakiss
2. "Pop Bottles" (Explicit)
3. "Pop Bottles" (Instrumental)

== Freestyles ==
- Pop Bottles Freestyle - Jim Jones Feat. Max B & DJ Scoob Doo
- Pop Bottles Freestyle - Fabolous

== Charts ==
The song peaked at #38 on the Billboard Hot 100, making it Birdman's second highest peak on the chart.

=== Weekly charts ===
Chart (2007–2008)	Peak position
US Billboard Hot 100	38
US Hot R&B/Hip-Hop Songs (Billboard)	15
US Hot Rap Songs (Billboard)	6
US Rhythmic Airplay (Billboard)	16

=== Year-end charts ===
Chart (2008)	Position
US Hot R&B/Hip-Hop Songs (Billboard)	63

== Certifications ==
Region	Certification	Certified units/sales
United States (RIAA)	Gold	500,000^{^}
United States (RIAA) Mastertone	Platinum	1,000,000^{*}
^{*} Sales figures based on certification alone.^{^} Shipments figures based on certification alone.
