= Turn My Swag On =

2008 single by Soulja Boy

Single by Soulja Boy Tellem

from the album iSouljaBoyTellem
- Released: October 21, 2008
- Recorded: 2008
- Genre: Trap
- Length: 3:31
- Label: Stacks on Deck; Collipark; HHH; Interscope
- Songwriters: DeAndre Way; Antonio "TopcaT" Randolph; Kelvin McConnell
- Producers: Natural Disaster; TopcaT

Soulja Boy Tellem singles chronology
"Bird Walk" (2008)	"Turn My Swag On" (2008)	"Kiss Me thru the Phone" (2009)

"Turn My Swag On" is a song written and recorded by American rapper Soulja Boy Tellem. It was released in October 2008 as the third single from his 2008 album iSouljaBoyTellem. It was performed at the 2009 BET Awards. The song topped the US Rap Charts and peaked at number 19 on the Hot 100. It has so far sold over 1,000,000 digital downloads in the US. It became Soulja Boy's third song to sell more than 1 million downloads, after "Kiss Me thru the Phone" and "Crank Dat (Soulja Boy)".

== Music video ==
The music video was directed by Matt Alonzo and shot at roger flouton house in Beverly Hills. The music video peaked at number 1 on the top 10 countdown of BET's 106 & Park. The video follows the theme of the song, with Soulja Boy Tellem appearing in the house while singing the song. It was leaked to YouTube before its official release date. The video ranked at number 5 on BET's Notarized: Top 100 Videos of 2009 countdown.

== Remixes and in popular culture ==
The official remix has a new verse by Soulja Boy and features Lil Wayne using the Auto-Tune effect. The song was leaked onto the Internet and YouTube on February 12, 2009. This remix charted at number 65 on the US Hot 100 Airplay Chart.

Atlanta hip-hop producer Greg Street created a remix of the song on 2009, combining Keri Hilson & Yung L.A.'s freestyles with the Soulja Boy original, which reached number 17 on the UK Singles Chart in September 2010 following a cover by Cher Lloyd during the audition process of the seventh series of The X Factor UK.

In the late summer of 2010, Austrian rapper Money Boy released a cover version titled "Dreh den Swag auf" with German lyrics.

R&B singer Beyoncé interpolated the song's hook into "Hold Up", a single from her 2016 album, Lemonade.

== Track listing ==
CD single

1. "Turn My Swag On" (album version) - 3:31
2. "Turn My Swag On" (instrumental) - 3:31
3. "Turn My Swag On" (Remix of album version) - 3:40
4. "Turn My Swag On" (Remix of instrumental) - 3:40

Digital download

1. "Turn My Swag On"

== Charts ==
=== Weekly charts ===
Chart (2009)	Peak position
UK Singles (Official Charts)	48
UK Hip Hop/R&B (Official Charts)	12
US Billboard Hot 100	19
US Hot R&B/Hip-Hop Songs (Billboard)	3
US Hot Rap Songs (Billboard)	3
US Pop 100 (Billboard)	39
US Rhythmic Airplay (Billboard)	12

=== Year-end charts ===
Chart (2009)	Position
US Billboard Hot 100	79
US Hot R&B/Hip-Hop Songs (Billboard)	50
