= 100 Million =

Single by Birdman featuring Young Jeezy, Rick Ross and Lil Wayne

from the album 5 * Stunna
- Released: November 23, 2007
- Recorded: 2007
- Genre: Southern hip hop; gangsta rap
- Label: Cash Money
- Songwriters: Bryan Williams; Andre Christopher Lyon; William Leonard Roberts II; Jay Jenkins; Dwayne Carter
- Producer: Cool & Dre

Birdman singles chronology
"Pop Bottles" (2007)	"100 Million" (2007)	"I Run This" (2008)

Young Jeezy singles chronology
"5000 Ones" (2007)	"100 Million" (2007)	"Love in This Club" (2008)

Rick Ross singles chronology
"I'm So Hood" (2007)	"100 Million" (2007)	"Lights Get Low" (2008)

Lil Wayne singles chronology
"Sweetest Girl (Dollar Bill)" (2007)	"100 Million" (2007)	"Gossip" (2007)

"100 Million" is the second single from Birdman's third studio album, 5 * Stunna. The track features Young Jeezy, Rick Ross and Lil Wayne, and was produced by Cool & Dre. Dre performs the chorus and DJ Khaled performs the intro and outro, but neither of the two are credited. The song discusses what Birdman believes is a major accomplishment: spending 100 million dollars. The song reached number sixty-nine on the Hot R&B/Hip-Hop Songs chart, and number eighteen on the Bubbling Under Hot 100 Singles chart. The song samples Ozzy Osbourne's "Mr. Crowley".

== Music video ==
The song's music video premiered on Access Granted on December 7, 2007 and was directed by Gil Green. The music video starts off with Birdman being interviewed by a parole board in a prison. It then introduces some people, such as Birdman and Fat Joe. The video then shows Rick Ross on a boat with his crew loading drugs. It then flicks to Birdman with various red cars. He sings his verse there and then shows Young Jeezy in a car and then that leads to Lil Wayne in a house. The video concludes with DJ Khaled's outro and Birdman saying that what he is going to do is make a lot of money, which is the overall basis of the song and video. The video aired on 106 & Park on December 10, 2007.

== Charts ==
Chart (2007)	Peak position
US Bubbling Under Hot 100 (Billboard)	18
US Hot R&B/Hip-Hop Songs (Billboard)	69
US Hot Rap Songs (Billboard)	20
