= Kiss Me thru the Phone =

2008 single by Soulja Boy

Single by Soulja Boy featuring Sammie

from the album iSouljaBoyTellem
- Released: November 26, 2008
- Recorded: 2008
- Genre: Pop rap; R&B; electropop
- Length: 3:13
- Label: Stacks on Deck; Collipark; HHH; Interscope
- Songwriters: DeAndre Way; James Scheffer; Michael Crooms; Sammie Bush, Jr.; David Siegel
- Producers: Jim Jonsin; Mr. Collipark (co.)

Soulja Boy singles chronology
"Bird Walk" (2008)	"Kiss Me thru the Phone" (2008)	"Turn My Swag On" (2009)

Sammie singles chronology
"Feelin 'It" (2008)	"Kiss Me thru the Phone" (2008)	"One Way Street" (2008)

Music video
- "Kiss Me Thru The Phone" on YouTube

"Kiss Me thru the Phone" is a song by American rapper Soulja Boy featuring American singer Sammie. Written by the former alongside David Siegel and producer Jim Jonsin, it was released on November 26, 2008, as the second single from his second studio album, iSouljaBoyTellem (2008). It was the best-selling single from the album, reaching number three on the U.S. Billboard Hot 100, number one on the U.S. Rap Charts, the top 10 in the United Kingdom, in Canada, on the U.S. Billboard Pop 100, and in New Zealand.

R&B singer Chris Brown was Soulja Boy's first choice to sing the hook, but Brown turned down the offer. Soulja Boy then tried to sing it on his own with Auto-Tune but found it "garbage", and ended up collaborating with Sammie. "Kiss Me thru The Phone" was 2009's eighth best selling single with over 5.7 million copies sold worldwide.

== Chart performance and sales ==
"Kiss Me thru the Phone" became highly successful for both Soulja Boy and Sammie on the charts. The single peaked at number 12 on the Billboard Bubbling Under R&B/Hip-Hop Singles chart. The song then hit number one on the Bubbling Under R&B/Hip-Hop Singles on the week of January 3, 2009. The song later debuted at number 71 on the U.S. Billboard Hot 100 on the week of January 10, 2009 and peaked at number three, making it Soulja Boy's second top five hit on the US charts since 2007's "Crank That". Also it would eventually start to chart on the Hot R&B/Hip-Hop Songs in the top ten at number four. The song has also debuted at number 71 on the Canadian Hot 100 and peaked at number 10. The song has reached number 1 on Hot Rap Tracks. The video ranked at number 14 on BET's Notarized: Top 100 Videos of 2009 countdown.

The song has sold over 2,261,000 digital downloads in the United States, becoming his second song to reach the two million mark in downloads, the first being "Crank That".

In New Zealand, the song debuted at number eleven on February 2, 2009, and later peaked at number two. It was certified Platinum by the RIANZ on July 12, 2009 with 15,000 digital downloads.

In the United Kingdom, "Kiss Me thru the Phone" debuted on the UK Singles Chart at number 63 on May 3, 2009, on downloads alone; the single has since peaked at number six. It held a position on BBC Radio 1's A-List. To date the single has sold more than 5 million copies worldwide.

== Music video ==
The music video was shot in New Orleans, Louisiana and Atlanta, Georgia at the Kelley residence. The video shows Soulja Boy doing his daily routine, when his girlfriend, played by future Real Housewives of Atlanta cast member Brit Eady, misses him and calls him, and shoots a video of herself making a kissing face on an iPhone and sends it to him. Featured artist Sammie also makes an appearance.

In addition there are also cameos from Arab, J-Bar, Vistoso Bosses, Vanessa Simmons, Miami Mike, and Dennis Rodman. The music video premiered on December 15, 2008, a day before the album's release. It also peaked number one on BET's video countdown, 106 & Park and ranked at number 16 on BET's Notarized: Top 100 Videos of 2009 countdown.

== Track listings ==
CD single

1. "Kiss Me thru the Phone" (Main version) - 3:11
2. "Kiss Me thru the Phone" (Instrumental) - 3:11

Australian CD single

1. "Kiss Me thru the Phone" (Main) - 3:14
2. "Bird Walk" (Main) - 3:33

Digital download

1. "Kiss Me thru the Phone"

== Charts ==
=== Weekly charts ===
Chart (2009)	Peak position
Australia (ARIA)	16
Belgium (Ultratop 50 Flanders)	39
Belgium (Ultratip Bubbling Under Wallonia)	5
Canada Hot 100 (Billboard)	10
Czech Republic Airplay (ČNS IFPI)	15
Europe (European Hot 100)	14
France (SNEP)	16
Ireland (IRMA)	11
New Zealand (Recorded Music NZ)	2
Scottish Singles Sales (Official Charts)	7
Slovakia Airplay (ČNS IFPI)	45
Sweden (Sverigetopplistan)	32
Switzerland (Schweizer Hitparade)	88
UK Singles (Official Charts)	6
UK Hip Hop/R&B (Official Charts)	3
US Billboard Hot 100	3
US Hot R&B/Hip-Hop Songs (Billboard)	4
US Hot Rap Songs (Billboard)	1
US Pop Airplay (Billboard)	5
US Rhythmic Airplay (Billboard)	1

=== Monthly charts ===
Chart (2009)	Position
Brazil (Brasil Hot 100 Airplay)	28
Brazil (Brasil Hot Pop Songs)	16

=== Year-end charts ===
Chart (2009)	Position
Australia (ARIA)	90
Brazil (Crowley)	67
Canada (Canadian Hot 100)	60
New Zealand (Recorded Music NZ)	14
UK Singles (OCC)	66
US Billboard Hot 100	19
US Hot R&B/Hip-Hop Songs (Billboard)	34
US Mainstream Top 40 (Billboard)	36
US Rhythmic (Billboard)	8

== Certifications ==
Region	Certification	Certified units/sales
Australia (ARIA)	Gold	35,000^{^}
Brazil (Pro-Música Brasil)	3× Platinum	180,000^{‡}
Denmark (IFPI Danmark)	Gold	45,000^{‡}
New Zealand (RMNZ)	5× Platinum	150,000^{‡}
United Kingdom (BPI)	2× Platinum	1,200,000^{‡}
Summaries
Worldwide (IFPI)	—	5,700,000
^{^} Shipments figures based on certification alone.^{‡} Sales+streaming figures based on certification alone.

== Release history ==
Release dates and formats for "Kiss Me thru the Phone"
Region	Date	Format	Label(s)	Ref.
United States	February 17, 2009	Mainstream airplay	Interscope	

== Telephone number ==
The telephone number, (678) 999-8212, given in the song, if dialed from the United States, previously connected to a message system for the artist. The number now belongs to an unknown commercial advertiser in Georgia. An unsuspecting family in Greater Manchester, England found themselves inundated with calls from Soulja Boy fans there who dialed the number.
