= Late Night Special =

Studio album by Pretty Ricky
- Released: January 23, 2007
- Recorded: 2006
- Genre: R&B; hip-hop
- Label: Atlantic; Bluestar
- Producer: DeJa "The Great"; Gorilla Tek; Diamond Blue Smith; Joseph "Bluestar" Smith; Static Major

Pretty Ricky chronology
Bluestars (2005)	Late Night Special (2007)	Pretty Ricky (2009)

Singles from Late Night Special
- 1. "On the Hotline" Released: November 9, 2006; 2. "Push It Baby" Released: March 1, 2007

Professional ratings
Review scores
Source	Rating
AllMusic	3/5 stars
Entertainment Weekly	B+
HipHopDX	0.5/5 stars
USA Today	2/4 stars

Late Night Special is the second studio album by American R&B group Pretty Ricky. It was released on January 23, 2007, by Atlantic Records and Bluestar. The album debuted atop the US Billboard 200 chart, selling over 132,000 copies in its first week. In its second week on the chart, it fell to number five with 62,000 sold in the United States. The album has since been certified Gold by the RIAA.

== Singles ==
The first single from the album is "On the Hotline" and a video for the song was released January 7, 2007 as a new joint on BET. The other singles were "Push It Baby" and "Love Like Honey". Another single "Wet Dreams" was released in late 2007.

== Track listing ==
#	Title	Time
1.	Late Night Special	3:42
2.	On the Hotline	4:03
3.	Love Like Honey	5:01
4.	Push It Baby	3:25
5.	Wet Dreams	4:00
6.	Stay	4:11
7.	So Confused (featuring Butta Créame)	4:25
8.	Personal Trainer	3:54
9.	Up and Down	4:33
10.	Peer Pressure	3:29
11.	Make It Like It Was	6:24
Digi-Pack Version
12.	Push It Baby (Remix) (featuring Sean Paul)	4:29
Deluxe Edition (Best Buy/Special Version)
12.	Searching For Love	4:07
13.	Too Young	5:30
14.	Should've Been A Model	4:10
15.	Makin Music	4:11
16.	Hey Girl	3:10
17.	Leave It All Up To You	3:45
18.	LaLa (South Got It On Lock)	3:41

Track 8 entitled "Personal Trainer" is replaced with "Go Getta (featuring Meat n Bones)" on the Amended Version

== Charts ==
=== Weekly charts ===
Chart (2007)	Peak position
US Billboard 200	1
US Top R&B/Hip-Hop Albums (Billboard)	1
US Top Rap Albums (Billboard)	1

=== Year-end charts ===
Chart (2007)	Position
US Billboard 200	106
US Top R&B/Hip-Hop Albums (Billboard)	30
