= 5 * Stunna =

5 ★ Stunna

Studio album by Birdman
- Released: December 11, 2007
- Recorded: 2006–07
- Genres: Southern hip-hop; gangsta rap
- Length: 75:25
- Labels: Cash Money; Universal
- Producers: Kane Beatz; T-Mix; Cool & Dre; Young Yonny; Tommy Gunnz; The Fliptones; Steve Morales, Raymond "Sarom" Diaz, StreetRunner; Jim Jonsin; Honorable C.N.O.T.E.; Drumma Boy; DVS Productions; JRock; Maestro; Mark Batson; Jeff Bhasker; Jeff Reid; Mousa; Rodnae; Jason "Jay E" Epperson; Keleigh Reid

Birdman chronology
| Like Father, Like Son (2006) | 5 ★ Stunna (2007) | Pricele$$ (2009) |

Singles from 5 * Stunna
- 1. "Pop Bottles" Released: June 15, 2007; 2. "100 Million" Released: November 23, 2007; 3. "I Run This" Released: May 14, 2008

Professional ratings
Review scores
| Source | Rating |
|---|---|
| AllMusic | 4/5 stars |
| DJBooth | 3.5/5 stars |
| HipHopDX | 3.5/5 stars |
| RapReviews | 6.5/10 stars |

5 * Stunna (stylized as 5 ★ Stunna, also known as 5 Star Stunna) is the third studio album by American rapper Birdman. It was released on December 11, 2007, by Cash Money Records and Universal Records. The album includes the productions from Kane Beatz, T-Mix, Cool & Dre, Young Yonny, DJ Tone, the Fliptones, Tommy Gunnz, Drumma Boy, Steve Morales and Raymond "Sarom" Diaz, among others. Protégé and fellow New Orleans-based rapper Lil Wayne guest appears on 7 of the 22 tracks. The album debuted at number 18 on the US Billboard 200, selling 80,000 copies in the first week. To date, the album has sold 372,000 copies in the United States.

Three singles were released from the album, each of them contain collaborations with Lil Wayne; "Pop Bottles", which also features guest vocals from rapper Jadakiss, "100 Million", which also features guest vocals from Young Jeezy, Rick Ross, Dre and DJ Khaled, and "I Run This".

== Background ==
The album was first rumored to be titled as 5 Star General, however, the title of the album was later changed into 5 Star Stunna.

== Singles ==
His official debut single for his third album, titled "Pop Bottles" was released on June 15, 2007. The song features guest vocals from his frequent collaborator and fellow rapper Lil Wayne, while it was produced by Raymond "Sarom" Diaz and Steve Morales.

The album's second single, titled "100 Million" was released on November 23, 2007. Lil Wayne also featured on this track, along with fellow rappers Young Jeezy and Rick Ross, and these record producers Dré and DJ Khaled. The song was produced by the production duo Cool & Dre.

The album's third single, "I Run This" was released on May 14, 2008. For the third time, Lil Wayne was featured on this track, while it was produced by T-Mix and Drumma Boy.

== Lawsuits ==
In October 2009, Birdman, Lil Wayne, Cash Money Records, and various music distribution outlets were sued for copyright infringement by Thomas Marasciullo, who claims his voice was used without permission. The rappers asked him to record some "Italian-styled spoken word recordings" in 2006. The lyrics were allegedly used on "Respect", and other tracks from the rappers' collaboration album Like Father, Like Son.

== Track listing ==
Credits adapted from the album's liner notes.

| No. | Title | Writer(s) | Producer(s) | Length |
|---|---|---|---|---|
| 1. | "Intro" | Keleigh Reid | Reid | 1:06 |
| 2. | "Fully Loaded" | Bryan Williams; Daniel Johnson | Kane Beatz | 3:40 |
| 3. | "I Run This" (featuring Lil Wayne) | Williams; Dwayne Carter, Jr.; Tristan "TMIX" Jones | TMIX | 3:31 |
| 4. | "The Money "So Fresh"" | Williams; Thomas "Tommy Gunns" Pham | Tommy Gunns | 4:35 |
| 5. | "The Old Man #1 (Interlude)" | Reid | Reid | 1:09 |
| 6. | "100 Million" (featuring Lil Wayne, Young Jeezy, and Rick Ross) | Williams; Carter, Jr.; Jay "Young Jeezy" Jenkins; William Roberts II; Andre Lyon; Marcello Valenzano | Cool & Dre | 3:29 |
| 7. | "Believe Dat" (featuring Lil Wayne) | Williams; Carter, Jr.; Jones | TMIX | 4:01 |
| 8. | "Wet Paint" | Williams; Jones | TMIX | 3:46 |
| 9. | "Grind" (featuring Lil Wayne and Brisco) | Williams; Carter, Jr.; British Mitchell; Nicholas "StreetRunner" Warwar; Chaz Mishan; David Delgado | StreetRunner | 3:48 |
| 10. | "All the Time" | Williams; James Scheffer | Jim Jonsin | 4:09 |
| 11. | "The Old Man #2 (Interlude)" | Reid | Reid | 0:48 |
| 12. | "Head Busta" | Williams; Ronald "Young Yonny" Ferebee, Jr. | Young Yonny | 4:28 |
| 13. | "Pop Bottles" (featuring Lil Wayne) | Williams; Carter, Jr.; Steve Morales; Raymond "Sarom" Diaz; Wayne Brown; Shandel Green; Jason Phillips; Deke Richards | Morales; Sarom | 3:27 |
| 14. | "Love My Hood" | Williams; Jones | TMIX | 4:32 |
| 15. | "I'm a Stunna" | Williams; Jones | TMIX | 4:37 |
| 16. | "The Old Man #3 (Interlude)" | Reid | Reid | 1:02 |
| 17. | "Make Way" (featuring Fat Joe and Lil Wayne) | Williams; Joseph Cartagena; Carter, Jr.; Mishan; Delgado | The Fliptones | 4:33 |
| 18. | "So Tired" (featuring Lil Wayne) | Williams; Carter, Jr.; Mishan; Delgado | The Fliptones | 4:06 |
| 19. | "Outro" | Williams; Reid | Reid | 0:50 |
| 20. | "We Gangsta" (featuring All Star and Yo Gotti) | Williams; Jermaine "All Star" Shute; Mario Mims; Jones | TMIX | 5:03 |
| 21. | "Bossy" (featuring Jason Derulo) | Williams; Jason Desrouleaux; Mishan; Delgado | The Fliptones | 3:46 |
| 22. | "R.I.P." | Williams; Jones | TMIX | 5:15 |

iTunes bonus track
| No. | Title | Producer(s) | Length |
|---|---|---|---|
| 23. | "'S' on My Chest" (featuring Lil Wayne) | Kane Beatz | 4:11 |

Sample credits

- "Pop Bottles" contains interpolations from "Put Ya Hands Up", performed by Jadakiss.
- "100 Million" contains a sample from "Mr. Crowley", performed by Ozzy Osbourne.

== Charts ==
=== Weekly charts ===
| Chart (2007–08) | Peak position |
|---|---|
| US Billboard 200 | 18 |
| US Top R&B/Hip-Hop Albums (Billboard) | 3 |
| US Top Rap Albums (Billboard) | 2 |

=== Year-end charts ===
| Chart (2008) | Position |
|---|---|
| US Billboard 200 | 125 |
| US Top R&B/Hip-Hop Albums | 31 |
| US Top Rap Albums | 12 |
