= Your Body (Pretty Ricky song) =

2005 single by Pretty Ricky

Single by Pretty Ricky

from the album Bluestars
- Released: June 15, 2005
- Recorded: February 2005
- Genre: R&B, Hip Hop, Dirty rap
- Length: 4:00
- Label: Atlantic
- Songwriter: Static Major
- Producer: Jim Jonsin

Pretty Ricky singles chronology
"Grind with Me" (2005)	"Your Body" (2005)	"Nothing but a Number" (2006)

"Your Body" is the second hit single by the R&B group Pretty Ricky produced by Jim Jonsin. It reached #12 on the 2005 Billboard Hot 100. It was the second single from their debut album, Bluestars.

The "Your Body" video starts with Pretty Ricky on the beach saying "Yes sir, yes sir, yes sir, yes sir," then they start singing, rapping and dancing the "Your Body" dance. Then the scene changes to them driving on the highway, and then Spectacular and Slick rap while they are walking along the beach. Spectacular Shirtless Rapping. Baby Blue raps while sitting with two girls in the car and partially standing next to his brothers in front the car in front the beach. At the end of the video Slick is shown still dancing and laughing while his brothers get in the car and the scene changes to show Spec following the camera and smiling and being silly while Pleasure shakes his head walking off.

== Charts ==
Chart (2005–2006)	Peak Position
Australia (ARIA)	45
Australian Urban (ARIA)	14
Canada CHR/Pop Top 30 (Radio & Records)	25
New Zealand (Recorded Music NZ)	13
Scottish Singles Sales (Official Charts)	64
UK Singles (Official Charts)	37
UK Hip Hop/R&B (Official Charts)	5
US Billboard Hot 100	12
US Hot R&B/Hip-Hop Songs (Billboard)	22
US Pop Airplay (Billboard)	11

== Release history ==
Country	Date	Format	Label
United States	June 15, 2005	Maxi single	Atlantic
United States	September 6, 2005	Contemporary hit radio	Atlantic
