= Pretty Ricky (album) =

Studio album by Pretty Ricky
- Released: November 17, 2009
- Recorded: 2009
- Genres: R&B; hip hop
- Length: 55:11
- Labels: Bluestar, Big Cat/Tommy Boy
- Producer: Diamond Blue Smith

Pretty Ricky chronology
Late Night Special (2007)	Pretty Ricky (2009)

Professional ratings
Review scores
Source	Rating
Allmusic	1.5/5 stars

Pretty Ricky is the third studio album by American R&B group Pretty Ricky. It was released on November 17, 2009, and featured new vocalist Lingerie replacing Pleasure P and 4Play.

== Commercial performance ==
The performance of Pretty Ricky was poor in comparison to the group's previous gold-selling albums Bluestars and Late Night Special. It charted for one week on the Billboard 200, at #97.

== Singles ==
Two singles, "Tipsy (In Dis Club)" and "Say a Command", were released from the album, but neither charted on the Billboard Hot 100.

== Track listing ==
1. "Intro" – 1:22
2. "Say a Command" – 3:45
3. "Mr. Goodbar" – 4:02
4. "Tipsy (In Dis Club)" – 4:11
5. "Smash" – 3:56
6. "Menage a Trois" – 4:07
7. "Sticky" – 3:47
8. "T.R.U.T.H." – 4:43
9. "Doggystyle" – 3:12
10. "Lapdance" – 3:58
11. "Black" – 6:27
12. "Discovery Channel (Wild Girl)" – 3:23
13. "Prince Charming" – 4:31
14. "Downtown" – 3:47
15. "Make-Up Sex" – 3:35 (iTunes Bonus Track)
