= Stuntin' Like My Daddy =

Single by Birdman and Lil Wayne

from the album Like Father, Like Son
- Released: July 18, 2006
- Recorded: 2006
- Genre: Hip hop
- Length: 4:27
- Label: Cash Money; Universal
- Songwriters: Birdman; Lil Wayne
- Producer: T-MIX

Lil Wayne singles chronology
"Gimme That (Remix)" (2006)	"Stuntin' Like My Daddy" (2006)	"You Know What" (2006)

Birdman singles chronology
"We Got That" (2005)	"Stuntin' Like My Daddy" (2006)	"We Fly High (Remix)" (2006)

"Stuntin' Like My Daddy" is the first single from Birdman and Lil Wayne's album, Like Father, Like Son. It peaked at number twenty-one on the Billboard Hot 100 in the United States, won the 2007 BET Viewer's Choice Award, and was named the 94th best song of 2006 by Rolling Stone magazine.

The Travis Barker rock remix of this song was released on the album on October 31, 2006.

== Music video ==
The music video has cameos from Yo Gotti, and All Star Cashville Prince.

== Freestyles and remixes ==
Freestyles by Lil Flip, Young Jeezy, and Plies have been made. A rock remix is featured on the deluxe version of the album. "Suicideyear" also has a popular remix of this song. Chief Keef also used the same instrumental from the song for his mixtape Finally Rolling 2. The song is titled 'Stuntin Like My Mamma'

== Sampling ==
The song was sampled by Soulja Boy on his song "Yamaha Mama" on the album iSouljaBoyTellem. It was also a featured sample on the first track of Girl Talk's Feed the Animals and has also been sampled on Lil Wayne & Nicki Minaj's "Don't Stop Won't Stop", a mixtape track from Da Drought 3.

== Charts ==
=== Weekly charts ===
Chart (2006)	Peak position
US Billboard Hot 100	21
US Hot R&B/Hip-Hop Songs (Billboard)	7
US Hot Rap Songs (Billboard)	5
US Rhythmic Airplay (Billboard)	31

=== Year-end charts ===
Chart (2006)	Position
US Hot R&B/Hip-Hop Songs (Billboard)	56
Chart (2007)	Position
US Hot R&B/Hip-Hop Songs (Billboard)	87

== Certifications ==
Region	Certification	Certified units/sales
United States (RIAA)	Platinum	1,000,000^{^}
United States (RIAA) Mastertone	Platinum	1,000,000^{*}
^{*} Sales figures based on certification alone.^{^} Shipments figures based on certification alone.
