= Toma (song) =

Single by Pitbull featuring Lil Jon

from the album M.I.A.M.I.
- Released: February 1, 2005
- Recorded: 2004
- Genre: Latin hip-hop; crunk
- Length: 3:33
- Label: TVT
- Songwriters: Armando Pérez; Jonathan Smith; Craig Love; LaMarquis Jefferson
- Producer: Lil Jon

Pitbull singles chronology
"Back Up" (2004)	"Toma" (2005)	"Dammit Man" (2005)

Lil Jon singles chronology
"Girlfight" (2005)	"Toma" (2005)	"Snap Yo Fingers" (2006)

Music video
- "Toma" on YouTube

"Toma" is the fourth single from rapper Pitbull's debut album M.I.A.M.I. (2005), and features Atlanta rapper and frequent collaborator Lil Jon. It peaked at No. 21 on the US Hot Rap Songs chart and No. 73 on the US Hot R&B/Hip-Hop Songs chart.

On several occasions, the song has been heavily edited to make it "radio-friendly". Most versions removed the English profanity in the song, while keeping the Spanish sexually-explicit lines, such as "Si tú quieres que te coma toda, abre las piernas" (which translates to "if you want me to eat you up, open your legs", a reference to cunnilingus) and "Quítate la ropa si estás caliente" (or "take your clothes off if you're hot", repeated several times in succession during the song's bridge). In the "clean" edits, the entire song is made radio-friendly by removing all explicit verses, in both languages.

The song was also featured in the 2006 films Step Up and Date Movie.

== Remix ==
An official remix features various dancehall artists as Mr. Vegas, Wayne Marshall, Red Rat, T.O.K., and Kardinal Offishall, appearing in Pitbull's remix album Money Is Still a Major Issue. An unofficial remix features Nina Sky with the beat sampled from "Conga" by Gloria Estefan on a mixtape.

== Charts ==
Chart performance for "Toma"
Chart (2005)	Peak position
US Bubbling Under Hot 100 Singles (Billboard)	8
US Hot R&B/Hip-Hop Songs (Billboard)	73
US Rhythmic Songs (Billboard)	18
US Rap Songs (Billboard)	21
