= Spectacular Smith =

American musician and entrepreneur (born 1986)

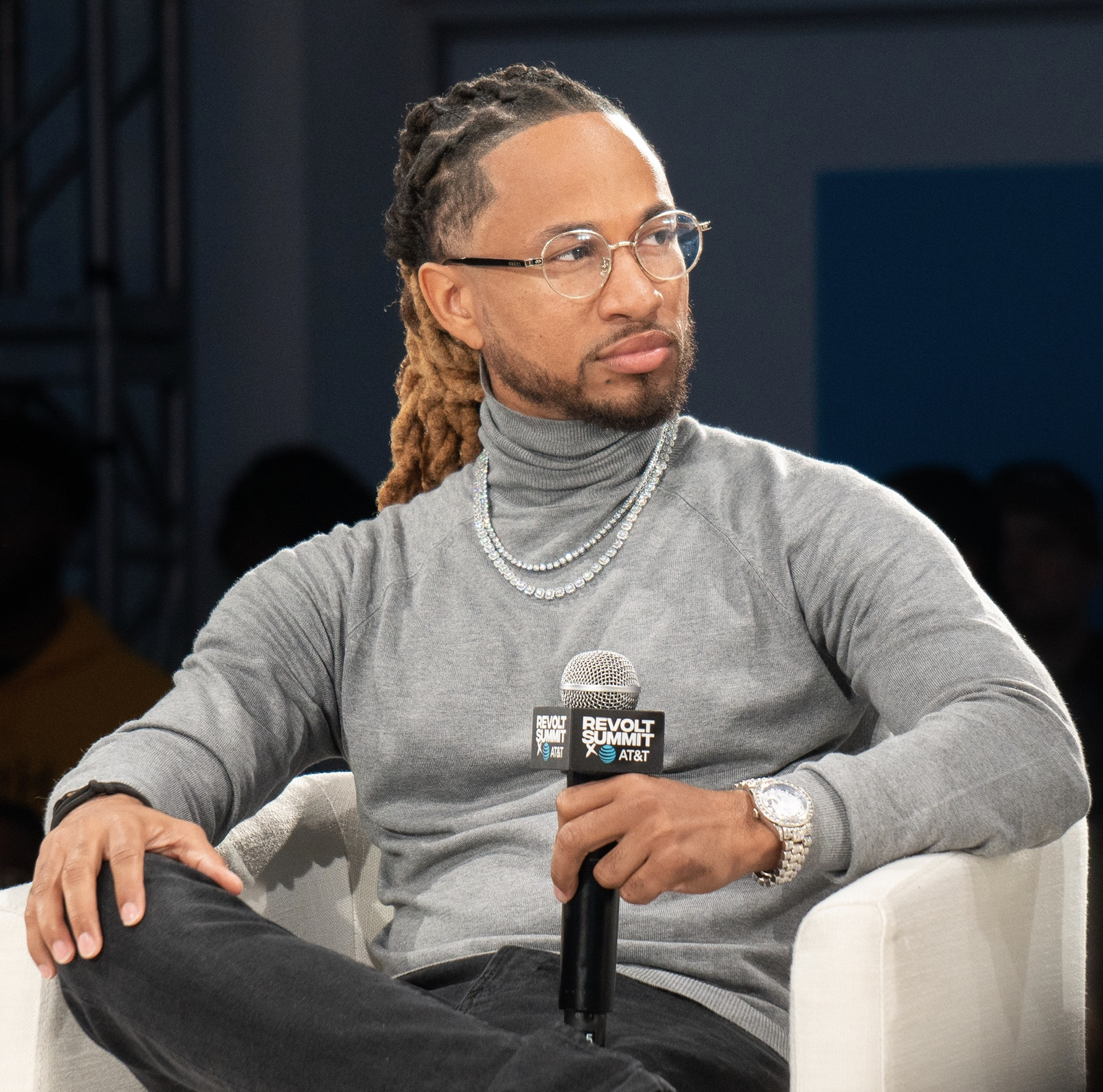
- Born: Spectacular Blue Smith; September 7, 1986 (age 40); Miami, Florida, U.S.
- Occupations: Rapper; Entrepreneur; Author; Investor; Entertainer; Keynote Speaker; TV Personality; Philanthropist
- Years active: 1997–present
- Television: Love & Hip Hop: Miami
- Musical career
- Genres: Hip hop, R&B
- Instrument: Vocals
- Labels: Pretty Ricky (current); Atlantic; Tommy Boy; Bluestar Ent; Mula Music Group

Spectacular Blue Smith (born September 7, 1986), known by his stage name Spectacular, is an American rapper, entrepreneur, keynote speaker, and philanthropist. He first rose to fame as a member of the R&B/hip-hop group Pretty Ricky before transitioning into business.

Smith serves as chair and CEO of Spectacular Academy and Adwizar Inc. and is the founder of the record label Mula Music Group. In 2018, Black Enterprise described Smith as "one of the five most influential celebs that cross‑pollinate between music and tech."

== Career ==
Smith started performing with his brother in a hip hop group called Pretty Ricky at the age of 11. His father, Joseph "Blue" Smith, of Jamaican descent, was the owner of the indie label and managed the group. Smith contributed musically and also choreographed the group's stage performances. After signing with Atlantic Records, the band went on the Scream IV tour, they promoted songs such as "Grind With Me" and "Your Body".

In addition to being a recording artist, Smith is also an entrepreneur. Intrigued by the business possibilities of social media, he experimented with Pretty Ricky's Facebook page, testing out theories behind social networks for a full year until he found a system for gaining and monetizing followers. He then turned those ideas into Adwizar, a company that manages and monetizes social media accounts. The company manages social media pages of artists such as Bow Wow, Kevin Gates, Soulja Boy, Master P, Birdman, and Bone Thugs-n-Harmony. Smith has also claimed that he is the owner of the social media brand Grumpy Cat, which he claims is valued at 100 million dollars.

On February 14, 2017, Smith released his first book, titled Spectacular Love: How to Make Good Love Last, published by Bluestar Books.

=== Spectacular Academy ===
In 2020 Smith founded Spectacular Academy, an online business school that provides training in social media growth, digital marketing, and online entrepreneurship. The program is aimed at helping aspiring business owners and content creators turn their online presence into profitable ventures. Through a combination of virtual workshops, mentorship, and software access via Adwizar.ai, the academy has educated thousands of students globally.

Spectacular Academy has received national recognition for its growth and impact. It has appeared multiple times on the Inc. 5000 list of fastest-growing private companies in the United States, most recently in 2024. It was also named to the Inc. Regionals Pacific list in 2025, ranking No. 44 with a 203% two-year growth rate.

The academy's success has been highlighted in national media for its role in democratizing business education and offering an alternative to traditional institutions.

=== Legal Matters ===
In December 2020 Smith was arrested at Walt Disney World following an alleged altercation with a park employee during a family outing. The employee claimed that Smith had assaulted him, leading to widespread media coverage and public scrutiny. Smith publicly denied wrongdoing, stating, "There’s two sides to every story."

In April 2025 a civil jury in Broward County, Florida, found Smith not liable in the $5 million lawsuit brought by the employee, Weland Bourne. The jury determined that Smith was not the aggressor and had acted lawfully in response to the situation. Evidence presented during the trial indicated that the employee did not properly identify himself and physically obstructed Smith while he was attempting to protect his son. The jury concluded that Bourne's actions were the primary cause of the incident.

=== Philanthropy ===
Spectacular Smith is involved in several philanthropic initiatives focused on education, entrepreneurship, and family support. He is the founder of the Single Mother Project, a charitable effort that has provided over $2 million in resources—including food, rent assistance, and emergency funding—for single mothers and underserved families across the United States.

Through his company and educational platform, Spectacular Academy, Smith has also supported digital entrepreneurship in underrepresented communities. In addition to offering scholarships and free business trainings, the academy has partnered with nonprofit organizations to provide mentorship and tools to aspiring entrepreneurs from disadvantaged backgrounds.

Smith has publicly emphasized the importance of giving back, stating that his philanthropic mission is rooted in his own upbringing and desire to "break cycles of poverty through education, opportunity, and love."

== Honors and awards ==
- In 2025 Spectacular Academy was ranked No. 44 on the Inc. 5000 Pacific Regionals list.
- In 2022 Spectacular Academy was ranked No. 76 on the Inc. 5000 Pacific Regionals list.
- In 2021 Spectacular Academy was ranked No. 2993 on the national Inc. 5000 list.
- In 2019 Adwizar was named Best Privately Owned Company in America by Entrepreneur Magazine on the Entrepreneur 360 list.
- In 2019 Smith was named Innovator of the Year by Black Enterprise.
- In 2019 he was also listed among 14 Entrepreneurial Thought Leaders from Black Twitter by Black Enterprise.
- In 2018 he was named one of the Top 5 Most Influential Entrepreneurs in Tech and Music by Black Enterprise.
- In 2018 he was listed among The 10 Most Inspiring Business Leaders by Mirror Review.
- In 2017 Adwizar was ranked No. 262 on the national Inc. 5000 list of fastest-growing private companies in America.
- In 2017 Smith was named Greatest and Most Inspiring Entrepreneur by Inc. Magazine.

== Discography ==
=== Singles ===
- 2005: "Grind with Me"
- 2005: "Your Body"
- 2006: "Nothing but a Number"
- 2006: "On the Hotline"
- 2007: "Love Like Honey"
- 2008: "Knockin Boots 08"
- 2008: "Cuddle Up" (featuring Butta Creame)
- 2009: "Tipsy (In Dis Club)"
- 2009: "Say a Command"
- 2010: "Personal Freak"
- 2010: "Cookie Cutter"
- 2011: "Topless"
- 2015: "Puddles"

== Filmography ==
=== Television ===
Year	Title	Notes	Ref.
2018	Love & Hip Hop: Miami (season 1)	Season 1, Guest Star	
2019	Love & Hip Hop: Miami (season 2)	Season 2, Supporting Cast	
2019	Love & Hip Hop: Hollywood (season 6)	Season 6, Guest Star	
