= Space Bound =

2011 single by Eminem

Single by Eminem

from the album Recovery
- Released: June 18, 2011
- Recorded: November–December 2009
- Studio: Parkland Playhouse, Parkland, Florida; 54 Sound, Effigy Studios, Ferndale, Michigan
- Genre: Alternative hip hop; pop rap; pop rock
- Length: 4:38
- Label: Shady; Aftermath; Interscope
- Songwriters: Marshall Mathers; Jim Jonsin; Steve McEwan
- Producer: Jim Jonsin

Eminem singles chronology
"Writer's Block" (2011)	"Space Bound" (2011)	"Throw That" (2012)

Music video
- "Spacebound" on YouTube

"Space Bound" is a song by American rapper Eminem. It was released on June 18, 2011, as the fourth and final single from his seventh album, Recovery. The song is produced by American hip-hop producer Jim Jonsin and features samples of "Drive" by R.E.M. and "Song for Bob" by Nick Cave and Warren Ellis.

The music video was shot in February 2011 by director Joseph Kahn and was released to the iTunes Store on June 24, 2011. Model and former pornographic actress Sasha Grey plays a young woman who secretly cheats on her boyfriend, Eminem; this turns into a violent conflict. The video shows two sides of Eminem, one who is calm and loves his girlfriend and one who is aggressive and does not. The video received attention and controversy for a scene in which Eminem shoots himself under the chin in frustration, with blood spurting from the exit wound.

== Development ==
"Space Bound" was written by Eminem, British songwriter Steve McEwan, and Jim Jonsin, the latter having produced the track with keyboards from Danny Morris. The chorus is sung by McEwan, who also provided guitars. The song was recorded by Robert Marks in Parkland Playhouse and Mike Strange and Joe Strange in Effigy Studios. It was mixed by Eminem, Mike Strange and Marks. In July 2011, producer Jim Jonsin spoke about the making of the song and how its production came to be. He submitted a beat to Eminem for release on Recovery, not knowing if it was planned for official release as a single.

The version initially sent to Eminem was a full song; complete with verses, B section, and a chorus by McEwan. Most of this original version was recorded in New York with a guitar vocal on an iPhone. About three months later, the concept was taken to Miami and produced. Once Eminem had the track, he used McEwan's chorus as a guide for writing the rapped verses. Eminem liked the song and its concept and wanted the sung verses removed and replaced with his own lyrics, as Jonsin revealed: "He had me strip down the verses [...] and make the track a little more hip hop, and he sent it out. I didn't really believe that it would end up on Eminem's album, let alone be a single." Jonsin spoke about the theme of the chorus in "Space Bound":

The chorus was based on a chase, a guy who's chasing after a woman that he's crazy about, he loves her; she's everything to him. I'm a rocket ship aiming at her heart, her heart's the moon—I'm going full-on.

According to Jonsin, the hardest part of the making of the song was getting it to Eminem. Jonsin's manager suggested it get sent to Eminem, but was concerned that Eminem would not do anything with it. Jonsin also confirmed in the interview that he would be working on Eminem's next solo album.

== Composition and reception ==
"Space Bound" features a sample of "Drive" by R.E.M. and "Song for Bob" by Nick Cave and Warren Ellis. The guitars were provided by Steve McEwan and additional keyboards were by Danny Morris.

"Space Bound" received mixed reviews from critics. In a review for Slant Magazine, M.T. Richards described "Space Bound" as "ugly" and "wafer-thin", going on to criticise the song's macabre content: "Eminem can't talk to women and he never could, so when he threatens to strangle anyone who leaves him, the peril feels forced and wholly off-putting." AbsolutePunk writer Thomas Nassiff, in his review for Recovery, stated that "Space Bound", along with five other songs, were "pure filler" and "don't require more than one listen."

== Music video ==
=== Development and release ===
The music video for "Space Bound" was filmed over three days in February 2011, in Los Angeles, California, and was produced over approximately five months. It was directed by Joseph Kahn, who previously directed Eminem's videos for "Without Me", "We Made You" and "Love the Way You Lie". Photos from the video shoot were released and two low quality snippets of the then-unfinished video leaked. A large portion of the music video was shot at a roadside diner. On June 18, 2011, Kahn tweeted that the "Space Bound" video was finally complete and was to be released soon. The same day, Kahn tweeted,"When you see Space Bound, look for the uncensored version. You'll ruin it for yourself if you don't". Sasha Grey spoke about her character. "Before each take, Joseph [Kahn] and I would talk a lot about her motives and attitude. Her ultimate moment doesn't come until the end, so I had plenty of time to build the fear!" The full video was released on June 24, 2011 at 5 pm EST for purchase on the iTunes Store, uncut.

=== Synopsis ===
In a scene from the song's music video, Eminem shoots himself in a motel

The video starts as Eminem walks down a road at night. He is picked up by his lover (Grey). Two versions of him are shown: one alone in the back seat, who is frustrated, paranoid and "hurling insults at Grey", and one sitting next to Grey who is calm. Grey lights a cigarette to smoke. The alternate Eminem disappears and the couple stop at a diner.

Eminem has two personages again as he enters the diner. The original Eminem sits with Grey at a table, while the other is on a bar stool. Grey takes out her cell phone and sends a text message to someone, and leaves to go to the restroom. Meanwhile, Eminem curiously takes out Grey's phone to see what she did, and is confused. He quickly puts the phone back as Grey comes back. Meanwhile, the alternate Eminem raps.

The couple go to a motel room and receive a knock on the door, which Eminem opens but does not see anyone. He has a flashback of the cell phone, which shows 'Unknown caller', and a gun in Grey's car along with the lighter and cigarette. He then tries to strangle his girlfriend, who suddenly disappears, leaving Eminem alone. He picks up Grey's pistol and shoots himself under the chin, as blood spurts from the back of his head. This also affects the alternate Eminem, who is still in the roadside diner. The video then rewinds, from when Eminem shoots himself, to when the couple go to the diner. The beginning scene repeats itself and Eminem is picked up (probably implying that Eminem is in an endless loop) They drive off to end the video.

=== Concept ===
I don't know if it necessarily has a thorough message, but I think it shows that even the strongest of love meets destruction at some point. Whether or not you come out of it together and whole is an entirely different question.

— Sasha Grey, MTV Interview

There is confusion surrounding the exact meaning and concept of the music video for "Space Bound". Grey explained her interpretation of the video to MTV, saying that Eminem was trying to depict the reality of relationships, that even the strongest of relationships can fall apart. "Em simply becomes company for her, and she mistakenly takes advantage of that." She said that the video could be interpreted "in many ways". Grey believed that the alternate Eminem who appears in the car is his subconscious.

The song's producer, Jim Jonsin, suggested that viewers watch it multiple times to figure out the concept and draw their own conclusion. He called the video "tricky", saying that the meaning is not obvious or completely clear in the video and one must watch it a few times to find it. Jonsin spoke about Eminem's two egos seen in the video as well:

It reminded me of Alanis Morissette's 'Ironic' video, where she's got her and her two other egos in the car...I think it was him living in the now as a person going through it and him living as a person who is witnessing it and can make other choices to not be in that scenario. Maybe he would've chose differently, so now he's watching himself.

=== Reception and controversy ===
The video received attention from reporters for the scene where Eminem dies of suicide by gunshot. Jonsin was dismissive: "Things happen in movies all the time...When my kids watch it, I like to explain to them in that manner: 'It's like a movie, ya know? He isn't really killing himself.'" The video was criticized by anti-violence campaigners in the United Kingdom. A spokesperson for the anti-violence group Mothers Against Violence told the Daily Mirror, "It's all about the money with these videos. Eminem isn't thinking about the families affected." The music video was both praised by fans and noted for its graphic nature. Before the video's premiere in July, New York Daily News editor Kathleen Perricone derided censorship of the video, saying, "Despite the gruesome and violent nature, music networks like MTV and BET have yet to ban the video—or even air it." Josh Grossberg from E! News was not swayed by the graphic suicide scene, saying it "sounds like an Eminem video, all right."

Critics made note of the "Space Bound" music video's similarities with the Kahn-directed "Love the Way You Lie", in which the couple was portrayed by actors. April Chieffo from The Celebrity Cafe said, "The video touches on the subject of domestic violence like 'Love the Way You Lie,' but this time there were deadly consequences." Rob Markman quoted about the death scene, "Throughout the video, Eminem follows Grey like a lost puppy. It's when they check into a motel room that the drama unfolds."

== Track listing ==
Digital download

No.	Title	Writer(s)	Producer(s)	Length
1.	"Space Bound"	Marshall Mathers; Jim Jonsin; Steve McEwan	Jim Jonsin	4:38

== Credits and personnel ==
Recording

- Recorded at: Effigy Studios in Ferndale, Michigan, and Parkland Playhouse in Parkland, Florida.

Personnel

- Eminem – songwriter, audio mixer
- Steve McEwan – songwriter, guitars, additional chorus vocals
- Jim Jonsin – songwriter, producer, programming, keyboards
- Mike Strange – recording, audio mixer
- Joe Strange – recording
- Rob Marks – recording, audio mixer
- Jason Wilkie – assistant engineering
- Matt Huber – assistant engineering
- Danny Morris – additional keyboards

Credits adapted from the digital booklet of Recovery.

== Charts ==
Chart (2011)	Peak position
Australia (ARIA)	51
Belgium Bubbling Under (Ultratop Flanders)	17
Brazil (ABPD)	72
Ireland (IRMA)	31
Poland (Polish Airplay New)	5
Romania (Romanian Top 100)	65
Scottish Singles Sales (Official Charts)	34
UK Hip Hop/R&B (Official Charts)	10
UK Singles (Official Charts)	34
US Bubbling Under Hot 100 Singles (Billboard)	19

== Certifications ==
Region	Certification	Certified units/sales
Australia (ARIA)	2× Platinum	140,000^{‡}
Brazil (Pro-Música Brasil)	Platinum	60,000^{‡}
New Zealand (RMNZ)	Platinum	30,000^{‡}
United Kingdom (BPI)	Platinum	600,000^{‡}
United States (RIAA)	2× Platinum	2,000,000^{‡}
^{‡} Sales+streaming figures based on certification alone.

== Release history ==
Country	Date	Format	Label
United States	March 8, 2011	Rhythmic radio	Shady; Aftermath; Interscope
