= M.I.A.M.I. =

Studio album by Pitbull
- Released: August 24, 2004
- Recorded: May 2003–May 2004
- Genre: Hip hop; crunk
- Length: 62:17
- Label: TVT
- Producer: Bigg D; Diaz Brothers; DJ Khaled; Lil Jon; Jim Jonsin; Nasty Beat Makers

Pitbull chronology
M.I.A.M.I. (2004)	Money Is Still a Major Issue (2005)

Singles from M.I.A.M.I.
- 1. "Culo" Released: July 6, 2004; 2. "That's Nasty" Released: October 27, 2004; 3. "Back Up" Released: December 22, 2004; 4. "Toma" Released: February 1, 2005; 5. "Dammit Man" Released: April 9, 2005

M.I.A.M.I. (backronym of Money Is a Major Issue) is the debut studio album by Cuban-American rapper Pitbull. It was released on August 24, 2004 via TVT Records. The production on the album was primarily handled by Lil Jon, Jim Jonsin, Diaz Brothers and DJ Khaled. The album also features guest appearances by Lil Jon, Bun B, Fat Joe, Lil Scrappy and Trick Daddy among others.

M.I.A.M.I. was supported by five singles: "Culo", "That's Nasty", "Back Up", "Toma" and "Dammit Man". The album received generally mixed reviews from music critics and a moderate commercial success. It debuted at number 14 on the US Billboard 200 chart, selling 55,000 copies in its first week.

== Production ==
The executive producer of M.I.A.M.I. is Lil Jon, based out of Atlanta and known for producing crunk songs, in addition to the Diaz Brothers.

== Critical reception ==
Professional ratings
Review scores
Source	Rating
AllMusic	3.5/5 stars
The Atlanta Journal-Constitution	D−
Blender	2/5 stars
The Miami Herald	3/4 stars
RapReviews	7/10
Stylus	8/10
Vibe	2.5/5 marks

M.I.A.M.I. received critical praise, especially in Pitbull's hometown of Miami. For the Miami New Times, Mosi Reeves especially praised Pitbull's performances in the second half of the album for "spitting thug raps and matching wits with Bun B from UGK, Trick Daddy, and Fat Joe." Evelyn McDonnell of The Miami Herald rated the album three out of four stars, calling Pitbull "a skilled rhymer with a fast, Eminem flow but a deeper, more serious voice" but criticizing the album for including "six gratuitous bump-and-grind tracks."

Nationally, the album got good reviews from Allmusic and Stylus Magazine. Alex Henderson of Allmusic rated the album three and a half stars out of five. While acknowledging that Pitbull "is hardly the first MC to rap about drugs and thug life or sex and women," Henderson praised "his willingness to combine Latin and Dirty South elements." For Stylus Magazine, Erick Bieritz scored the album eight out of 10 points, describing it as "that odd record frontloaded with weak material and then packed with great songs on the B-side" with an "excellent taste in collaborators."

While praising "Culo" and "Hurry Up and Wait", Alex P. Kellogg offered a more critical review for The Boston Globe: "...[the] chosen topics (partying, not giving a damn, and, ooh, giving up a life of crime) do not exactly make for groundbreaking material. From his spitfire style to his hoarse catcalls, it's clear Pitbull is excited, but he's not always exciting." Jon Caramanica rated the album two stars out of five for Blender, calling the album outside of the Lil Jon-produced tracks "nimble but dull." Nick Marino of The Atlanta Journal-Constitution graded the album with a D-minus, for continuing what he called "a long tradition of substituting sex drive for imagination" by rappers from Miami. Commenting about the Atlanta-based executive producer, Marino wrote: "Lil Jon...for all his crunk magic, can only help a guy so much."

== Commercial performance ==
M.I.A.M.I. debuted at number 14 on the US Billboard 200 chart, selling 55,000 copies in its first week. The album also debuted at number one on the US Top Independent Albums chart. Since its release the album has spent 40 weeks on the chart. On April 8, 2005, the album was certified gold by the Recording Industry Association of America (RIAA) for sales of over 500,000 copies. As of November 2012, the album has sold 644,000 copies in the United States.

== Track listing ==
M.I.A.M.I. track listing
No.	Title	Writer(s)	Producer(s)	Length
1.	"305 Anthem" (featuring Lil Jon)	Armando Perez; Jonathan Smith	Lil Jon	4:13
2.	"Culo" (featuring Lil Jon)	Cordel Burrell; Perez; J. Smith; Clifford Smith	Lil Jon; Diaz Brothers	3:39
3.	"She's Freaky"	Hugo Diaz; Luis Diaz; Perez	Diaz Brothers	3:20
4.	"Shake It Up" (featuring Oobie)	Perez; J. Smith; Corellius Johnson; Tenaia Sanders	Lil Jon	3:14
5.	"Toma" (featuring Lil Jon)	Perez; J. Smith	Lil Jon	3:33
6.	"I Wonder" (featuring Oobie)	Perez; J. Smith; Sanders	Lil Jon	3:51
7.	"Get on the Floor" (featuring Oobie)	Perez; Sanders; J. Smith	Lil Jon	3:05
8.	"Dirty" (featuring Bun B)	Perez; Bernard Freeman; D. Woody	The Demi	4:36
9.	"Dammit Man" (featuring Piccallo)	Perez; Johnson; Laron Young; Jim Jonsin	Jim Jonsin	4:01
10.	"We Don't Care Bout Ya" (featuring Cubo)	Perez; L. Diaz; H. Diaz; Frank Roman	Diaz Brothers	5:06
11.	"That's Nasty" (featuring Lil Jon, Fat Joe and Lil Scrappy)	Perez; J. Smith; Darryl Richardson; Johnny Mollings; Lenny Mollings; Joseph Cartagena	DJ Nasty & LVM	4:12
12.	"Back Up"	Perez; H. Diaz; L. Diaz; Francisco Del	Del; Diaz Brothers	3:38
13.	"Melting Pot" (featuring Trick Daddy)	Perez; Maurice Young; Khaled Khaled	DJ Khaled	3:57
14.	"Hustler's Withdrawal"	Perez; H. Diaz; L. Diaz	Diaz Brothers	4:09
15.	"Hurry Up and Wait"	Perez; Esteban Trujillo	Tru	3:34
16.	"Culo (Miami Mix)" (featuring Mr. Vegas and Lil Jon)	Burrell; Perez; J. Smith; C. Smith	Lil Jon; Diaz Brothers	4:09
Total length:				62:17

Sample credits

- "Culo" contains the rhythm "Coolie Dance Riddim" by Cordel "Scatta" Burrell.
- "Melting Pot" contains an interpolation of "La Costa", written by Linda Williams and Natalie Cole.

== Charts ==
=== Weekly charts ===
Weekly chart performance for M.I.A.M.I.
Chart (2004)	Peak position
US Billboard 200	14
US Independent Albums (Billboard)	1
US Top R&B/Hip-Hop Albums (Billboard)	7
US Top Rap Albums (Billboard)	6

=== Year-end charts ===
Year-end chart performance for M.I.A.M.I.
Chart (2005)	Position
US Top R&B/Hip-Hop Albums (Billboard)	93

== Certifications ==
Certifications for M.I.A.M.I.
Region	Certification	Certified units/sales
United States (RIAA)	Gold	634,000
