= Leather So Soft =

Single by Birdman and Lil Wayne

from the album Like Father, Like Son
- Released: November 2, 2006
- Recorded: 2006
- Genre: Hip hop
- Length: 4:51 (album version); 4:18 (clean/radio edit)
- Label: Cash Money; Universal
- Songwriters: Dwayne Carter; D. DeGrate; J. Jonsin; R. Troutman; L. Troutman; B. Williams
- Producer: Jim Jonsin

Birdman singles chronology
| "We Fly High (Remix)" (2006) | "Leather So Soft" (2006) | "Make It Rain (Remix)" (2007) |

Lil Wayne singles chronology
| "Make It Rain" (2006) | "Leather So Soft" (2006) | "Hollywood Divorce" (2006) |

"Leather So Soft" is a song by American rappers Birdman and Lil Wayne. It was released on November 2, 2006, as the second single from their collaborative album, Like Father, Like Son. It failed to enter the Billboard Hot 100, but peaked at 18 on the Bubbling Under Hot 100 chart. As a ringtone, the song received platinum certification by the Recording Industry Association of America (RIAA).

The accompanying music video contains various deafness interpretations (beginning at 2:55), and features a guitar solo from Wayne towards the end.

== Charts ==
| Chart (2006) | Peak position |
|---|---|
| US Bubbling Under Hot 100 (Billboard) | 18 |
| US Hot R&B/Hip-Hop Songs (Billboard) | 41 |
| US Hot Rap Songs (Billboard) | 16 |

== Certifications ==
| Region | Certification | Certified units/sales |
|---|---|---|
| United States (RIAA) | Platinum | 1,000,000^{*} |
^{*} Sales figures based on certification alone.
