= I Run This =

2008 single by Birdman

Single by Birdman featuring Lil Wayne

from the album 5 * Stunna
- B-side: "Bossy"
- Released: May 14, 2008
- Recorded: 2007
- Genre: Southern hip hop
- Length: 3:35
- Label: Cash Money
- Songwriters: Bryan Williams, D. Carter
- Producer: T-Mix

Birdman singles chronology
| "100 Million" (2007) | "I Run This" (2008) | "Foolish (Remix)" (2008) |

Lil Wayne singles chronology
| "Girls Around the World" (2008) | "I Run This" (2008) | "Cuddy Buddy" (2008) |

Music video
- "I Run This" on YouTube

"I Run This" is the third single from Birdman's third studio album 5 * Stunna. It features Lil Wayne. It is produced by T-Mix. Lil Jon, Brisco, DJ Drama and Glasses Malone make cameo appearances in the video. BET's 106 & Park premiered it all day on May 14, 2008.

Now-retired baseball player Ryan Sweeney used "I Run This" as his walk-up song before he batted while he was a member of the Oakland Athletics from 2008-2011.

== Remix ==
A remix has surfaced on the web, although the only change is a new verse performed by Lil Wayne. This version of the song was used for the music video instead of the original.

== Charts ==
| Chart (2008) | Peak position |
|---|---|
| US Bubbling Under Hot 100 (Billboard) | 10 |
| US Hot R&B/Hip-Hop Songs (Billboard) | 69 |
