= On the Hotline =

Single by Pretty Ricky

from the album Late Night Special
- Released: November 9, 2006
- Recorded: 2006
- Genre: R&B, hip hop, Dirty rap
- Length: 4:02
- Label: Atlantic
- Songwriters: H. Azor, M. Cooper, S. Garrett, C. Mathis, R. Sandapa, D. Smith, J. Smith, S. Smith
- Producers: Music Royale, Static Major, Groove

Pretty Ricky singles chronology
"Nothing But A Number" (2006)	"On the Hotline" (2006)	"Push It Baby" (2007)

"On the Hotline" is a 2006 R&B and rap song by American quartet Pretty Ricky. It was released on November 9, 2006, as the lead single from their second studio album, Late Night Special (2007). The single first premiered on BET's Access Granted in November 2006.

The song debuted on the US Billboard Hot 100 at number 97 on December 28, 2006. It has also charted on the Billboard Hot R&B/Hip-Hop Songs peaking at number six. In its fifth week on the Billboard Hot 100, the song jumped 60 spots from 72 to 12 in the same week as the release of Late Night Special, which debuted at number one on the album chart.

Rolling Stone listed it as the 78th best R&B song of the 21st century.

== Song information ==
"On The Hotline" is a song about a telephone conversation; specifically, about having phone sex late at night ("five in the morning"). The chorus is a lyrically modified version of Salt-N-Pepa's "Let's Talk About Sex", including the original lyrics, "Let's talk about sex, baby, let's talk about you and me." Like all other Pretty Ricky singles, there is an explicit album version, and a radio-friendly version. The beat in the song is a combination of samples taken from the Isley Brothers' "Between the Sheets", Grandmaster Flash's "The Message" and Newcleus' "Jam On It", not to mention Rick James' hit single "Mary Jane". "On The Hotline" is produced by Music Royale, Static Major & Groove.

The official remix, "On The Hotline (We The Best Remix)", features DJ Khaled, Butta Creame, Missy Elliott, Meat & Bonez, and Jim Jones. There is an alternate version of the remix that replaces Jim Jones with Rick Ross called the International Remix. It can be found on the international single of "Push It Baby".

== Charts ==
=== Weekly charts ===
Chart (2006–07)	Peak position
UK Singles Chart	121
US Billboard Hot 100	12
US Pop Airplay (Billboard)	29
US Hot R&B/Hip-Hop Songs (Billboard)	6
US Rhythmic Airplay (Billboard)	4

=== Year-end charts ===
Chart (2007)	Position
US Billboard Hot 100	82
US Hot R&B/Hip-Hop Songs (Billboard)	36
US Rhythmic (Billboard)	24
