= Bird Walk =

2008 single by Soulja Boy

Single by Soulja Boy Tellem

from the album iSouljaBoyTellem
- Released: October 7, 2008
- Recorded: August 2008
- Genre: Snap
- Length: 3:33
- Label: Stacks on Deck; Collipark; HHH; Interscope
- Songwriter: DeAndre Way
- Producer: Soulja Boy Tellem

Soulja Boy Tellem singles chronology
"Marco Polo" (2008)	"Bird Walk" (2008)	"Turn My Swag On" (2008)

"Bird Walk" is the first single from Soulja Boy's 2008 album iSouljaBoyTellem.

== Song information ==
The song was performed on the first YouTube Live on November 22, 2008, with an introduction from MC Hammer.

== Track listing ==
CD single

1. "Bird Walk" (main version) – 3:33
2. "Bird Walk" (instrumental)

Download

1. "Bird Walk"

== Chart performance ==
Chart (2008)	Peak position
US Bubbling Under Hot 100 (Billboard)	2
US Hot R&B/Hip-Hop Songs (Billboard)	40
US Hot Rap Songs (Billboard)	17
