= Like Father, Like Son (Birdman and Lil Wayne album) =

Studio album by Birdman and Lil Wayne
- Released: October 31, 2006
- Recorded: 2005–2006
- Studio: CMR (New Orleans)
- Genres: Southern hip-hop; gangsta rap
- Length: 74:05
- Labels: Cash Money; Universal
- Producers: T-Mix; Scott Storch; Jim Jonsin; DJ Nasty & LVM; Angel; Robin Thicke

Birdman chronology
Fast Money (2005)	Like Father, Like Son (2006)	5 * Stunna (2007)

Lil Wayne chronology
Dedication 2 (2006)	Like Father, Like Son (2006)	Da Drought 3 (2007)

Singles from Like Father, Like Son
- 1. "Stuntin' Like My Daddy" Released: July 18, 2006; 2. "Leather So Soft" Released: November 2, 2006; 3. "Know What I'm Doin'" Released: January 30, 2007; 4. "You Ain't Know" Released: April 17, 2007

Like Father, Like Son is a collaborative studio album by American rappers Birdman and Lil Wayne. The album was released on October 31, 2006, through Cash Money Records and Universal Records. Guest appearances include Fat Joe, T-Pain, Rick Ross, Tha Dogg Pound and All Star Cashville Prince. Producers included Swizz Beatz and Scott Storch.

The album's first single was "Stuntin' Like My Daddy". The second single released from the album was "Leather So Soft". The third single was "You Ain't Know". All of those singles have music videos. The album debuted at number three on the US Billboard 200 chart, selling 176,000 copies in its first week. The album was later certified gold by the Recording Industry Association of America (RIAA) in December 2006.

== Background ==
In February 2006, Birdman and Lil Wayne released a mixtape, The Carter 2 Part 2: Like Father Like Son, hosted by DJ Khaled to promote the album. The mixtape had leftover tracks from Lil Wayne's album Tha Carter II and early versions of tracks that would later end up on Like Father, Like Son. According to the Cash Money's website, and an aggressive street campaign in Houston, the album was initially scheduled for release on September 26, 2006 but delays pushed the release back to October 31, 2006. In an interview, Lil Wayne said that "Army Gunz" might be the fourth single from the album. However, the song has not been released. In January 2009, Birdman said in an interview that a movie based on the title of the album and starring him and Wayne would be released in June 2009, but it was never made.

== Critical reception ==
Professional ratings
Review scores
Source	Rating
AbsolutePunk.net	75/100
AllMusic	3.5/5 stars
Blender	3/5 stars
HipHopDX	3.5/5 stars
RapReviews	(7/10)
Rhapsody	(favorable)
Rolling Stone	3.5/5 stars
Stylus	(C)
XXL	4/5 stars

Like Father, Like Son received mostly positive reviews from music critics. AllMusic gave the album three and a half stars out of five, saying, "There's probably too much get money/stack-paper for those who want Wayne to speak on the injustices New Orleans has suffered post-Katrina, or to get to work on Tha Carter III, but that's not what Like Father, Like Son is about. This is the sure sound of Cash Money steadying the ship and getting back on course".

XXL Magazine also praised the album, giving it four stars out of five (XL), saying "With solid production throughout, Wayne's ever-evolving sentence structure and Baby's uncanny swagger, Like Father, Like Son falters only in the diversity department. Over the course of the project's 20 tracks, continued references to their dope-dealing pasts ("1st Key" and "Over Here Hustlin'") begin to dilute what otherwise is a solid project that ushers in a new Cash Money dynasty."

== Commercial performance ==
Like Father, Like Son debuted at number three on the US Billboard 200 chart, selling 176,000 copies in its first week. This became Birdman's second and Wayne's fifth US top-ten debut. In its second week, the album dropped to number seven on the chart, selling an additional 72,000 copies. On December 11, 2006, the album was certified gold by the Recording Industry Association of America (RIAA) for sales of over 500,000 copies in the United States.

== Lawsuit ==
In October 2009, Birdman, Lil Wayne, Cash Money Records and various music distribution outlets were sued for copyright infringement by Thomas Marasciullo, who claimed his voice was used without permission. The rappers asked him to record some "Italian-styled spoken word recordings" in 2006. The lyrics were allegedly used on "Respect" and other tracks from Like Father, Like Son and Birdman's 5 * Stunna.

== Track listing ==
No.	Title	Writer(s)	Producer(s)	Length
1.	"Loyalty" (skit)			1:57
2.	"Over Here Hustlin’"	Bryan Williams; Dwayne Carter; Leonardo Mollings; Johnny Mollings	DJ Nasty & LVM	4:52
3.	"Stuntin' Like My Daddy"	B. Williams; Carter; T-Mix	T-Mix	4:29
4.	"1st Key"	B. Williams; Carter; T-Mix; Chad Butler; Bernard Freeman	T-Mix	4:15
5.	"Like Father, Like Son"	B. Williams; Carter; T-Mix	T-Mix	4:23
6.	"You Ain't Know"	B. Williams; Carter; Scott Storch	Scott Storch	4:24
7.	"Family Rules" (skit)			0:44
8.	"Know What I'm Doin'" (featuring Rick Ross & T-Pain)	B. Williams; Carter; William Roberts; Faheem Rashad Najm; T-Mix	T-Mix	4:44
9.	"Don't Die"	B. Williams; Carter; T-Mix	T-Mix	3:56
10.	"Ain't Worried Bout Shit"	B. Williams; Carter; T-Mix	T-Mix	3:47
11.	"Out the Pound" (performed by Birdman)	B. Williams; T-Mix	T-Mix	4:18
12.	"Leather So Soft"	B. Williams; Carter; Jim Jonsin; Donald DeGrate; Roger Troutman; Larry Troutman	Jim Jonsin	4:54
13.	"Army Gunz" (performed by Lil Wayne)	Carter; L. Mollings; J. Mollings	DJ Nasty & LVM	4:05
14.	"Protector" (skit)			0:36
15.	"Get That Money"	Carter; T-Mix	T-Mix	4:43
16.	"No More" (featuring All Star Cashville Prince)	B. Williams; Carter; Jermaine Shute; T-Mix	T-Mix	4:40
17.	"High"	B. Williams; Carter; T-Mix	T-Mix	4:02
18.	"Cali Dro" (featuring Tha Dogg Pound)	Carter; Delmar Arnaud; Dave Williams; L. Mollings; J. Mollings	DJ Nasty & LVM	4:31
19.	"About All That" (featuring Fat Joe)	B. Williams; Carter; Joseph Antonio Cartagena; T-Mix	T-Mix	4:31
20.	"Respect" (skit)			0:35
Total length:				74:05

Bonus Disc
No.	Title	Producer(s)	Length
1.	"Stuntin' Like My Daddy" (Rock Remix)	T-Mix	4:40
2.	"Brown Paper Bag" (featuring Swizz Beatz)	Angel	3:45
3.	"Neighborhood Superstars" (performed by Birdman)	T-Mix	3:40
4.	"I'm Ridin'" (performed by Lil Wayne)	T-Mix	6:32
5.	"Shooter" (performed by Lil Wayne featuring Robin Thicke)	Robin Thicke	4:37
Total length:			1:37:40

Sample credits

- "1st Key" contains samples from "Pocket Full of Stones", written by Chad Butler and Bernard Freeman, as recorded by UGK.
- "Leather So Soft" contains a sample of "Feenin'", written by Donald DeGrate, Roger Troutman, and Larry Troutman; as performed by Jodeci.

== Charts ==
=== Weekly charts ===
Chart (2006)	Peak position
US Billboard 200	3
US Top R&B/Hip-Hop Albums (Billboard)	1
US Top Rap Albums (Billboard)	1

=== Year-end charts ===
Chart (2006)	Position
US Top R&B/Hip-Hop Albums (Billboard)	63
Chart (2007)	Position
US Billboard 200	94
US Top R&B/Hip-Hop Albums (Billboard)	24

== Certifications ==
Region	Certification	Certified units/sales
United States (RIAA)	Gold	500,000^{^}
^{^} Shipments figures based on certification alone.
