= Culo (song) =

2004 single by Pitbull featuring Lil Jon

Single by Pitbull featuring Lil Jon

from the album M.I.A.M.I.
- Released: July 6, 2004
- Recorded: 2003–2004
- Genre: Dancehall; hip hop
- Length: 3:39
- Label: TVT
- Songwriters: Clifford Smith; Cordell Burrell; Armando Perez; Jonathan Smith; C. Smith
- Producers: Diaz Brothers; Lil Jon

Pitbull singles chronology
| "Culo" (2004) | "That's Nasty" (2004) |

Lil Jon singles chronology
| "Yeah!" (2004) | "Culo" (2004) | "Real Gangstaz" (2004) |

Music video
- "Pitbull - Culo ft. Lil Jon (Official Video)" on YouTube

"Culo" (English: "Ass") is the debut single by Cuban-American rapper Pitbull. The song was produced by Lil Jon, who is also a featured artist. It served as the lead single from Pitbull's debut album M.I.A.M.I. The song uses the Coolie Dance riddim, which gained prominence from Nina Sky's hit "Move Ya Body". "Culo" also samples Mr. Vegas' song "Pull Up", for which Pitbull and Lil Jon were sued by Mr. Vegas. However, a mash-up of "Culo" and "Pull Up", named "Pull Up (The Culo Remix)", later appeared on Mr. Vegas's 2004 album Pull Up.

"Culo" peaked at number 32 on the US Billboard Hot 100, number 45 on the US Hot R&B/Hip-Hop Songs chart, and number 11 on the US Hot Rap Songs chart. The remix version features Lil Jon and Ivy Queen. The song was included on Billboard's "12 Best Dancehall & Reggaeton Choruses of the 21st Century" at number twelve.

== Charts ==
| Chart (2004) | Peak position |
|---|---|
| US Billboard Hot 100 | 32 |
| US Hot R&B/Hip-Hop Songs (Billboard) | 45 |
| US Hot Rap Songs (Billboard) | 11 |
| US Rhythmic (Billboard) | 7 |
