= Dammit Man =

Single by Pitbull featuring Piccalo

from the album M.I.A.M.I.
- Released: April 9, 2005
- Recorded: 2004
- Genre: Hip house; crunk; Cuban folk
- Length: 4:01
- Label: TVT
- Songwriters: Armando Pérez; C.J. Johnson; James Scheffer; Frank Romano
- Producer: Jim Jonsin

Pitbull singles chronology
"Toma" (2005)	"Dammit Man" (2005)	"Shake" (2005)

Music video
- "Dammit Man" on YouTube

"Dammit Man" is a song by American rapper Pitbull featuring Piccalo. It was released on August 3, 2004 as a single from Pitbull's debut album M.I.A.M.I..The song was produced by Jim Jonsin. It peaked at number 19 on the US Bubbling Under Hot 100 Singles chart. It was also featured in the 2005 video game Midnight Club 3: Dub Edition.

== Music video ==
This video was directed by Flyy Kai. It features both Pitbull and Piccallo. The video also features a cameo from DJ Khaled.

== Track listing ==
1. "Dammit Man" (album version; featuring Piccallo) – 4:01
2. "Dammit Man" (remix; featuring Lil' Flip) – 3:46

== Charts ==
Chart performance for "Dammit Man"
Chart (2004–2005)	Peak position
US Bubbling Under Hot 100 Singles (Billboard)	19
US Hot R&B/Hip-Hop Songs (Billboard)	58
US Rhythmic Songs (Billboard)	33

== Release history ==
Release history and formats for "Dammit Man"
Region	Date	Format(s)	Label(s)	Ref.
United States	September 27, 2004	Rhythmic contemporary radio	TVT	
United States	October 4, 2004	Urban contemporary radio	TVT	
