= ISouljaBoyTellem =

iSouljaBoyTellem

Studio album by Soulja Boy Tell 'Em
- Released: December 16, 2008
- Recorded: 2008
- Genres: Southern hip-hop; pop rap
- Length: 60:02
- Labels: Stacks on Deck; HHH Artists; Collipark; Interscope
- Producers: Soulja Boy (also exec); Drumma Boy; Natural Disaster; Top Cat; J. R. Rotem; Polow da Don; Jim Jonsin; Mr. Collipark; The Runners; Mr. Hanky; Zaytoven; Tha Bizness; John Boy; DJ GB

Soulja Boy Tell 'Em chronology
Souljaboytellem.com (2007)	iSouljaBoyTellem (2008)	The DeAndre Way (2010)

Singles from iSouljaBoyTellem
- 1. "Bird Walk" Released: October 7, 2008; 2. "Turn My Swag On" Released: October 21, 2008; 3. "Kiss Me thru the Phone" Released: November 25, 2008

iSouljaBoyTellem is the second studio album by American rapper Soulja Boy. It was released on December 16, 2008, by Collipark Music, Stacks on Deck Entertainment and Interscope Records. The album was mostly produced by Soulja Boy, along with several record producers such as Drumma Boy, J. R. Rotem, Jim Jonsin, Tha Bizness and Zaytoven, as well as the guest appearances from Gucci Mane, Shawty Lo and Yo Gotti, among others. The album was supported by three singles: "Bird Walk", "Kiss Me thru the Phone" featuring Sammie, and "Turn My Swag On".

iSouljaBoyTellem debuted at number 43 on the US Billboard 200, selling 46,000 copies in its first week. The album received negative reviews from music critics, who saw it as recycled material from his previous album.

== Background ==
The album's first original single was intended to be "iDance", which was released online back in 2008. However, the song was dropped from the album for unknown reasons, with the possibility of "Bird Walk" catering more than towards Soulja Boy's original breakout single "Crank That (Soulja Boy)".

== Singles ==
"Bird Walk" was released as the album's lead single on October 7, 2008. The song only managed to peak at number 2 on the US Bubbling Under Hot 100 Singles.

"Kiss Me Thru the Phone" featuring Sammie, was released as the album's second single on November 25, 2008. The song peaked at number 3 on the US Billboard Hot 100, becoming the rapper's second top ten hit on the chart.

"Turn My Swag On" was released as the album's third single on October 21, 2008. The song peaked at number 19 on the Billboard Hot 100 in the United States.

=== Other songs ===
The music video for "Soulja Boy Tell 'Em" was released on November 9, 2008. The music video for "Gucci Bandanna" featuring Gucci Mane and Shawty Lo, was released on April 23, 2009.

== Critical reception ==
Professional ratings
Aggregate scores
Source	Rating
Metacritic	42/100
Review scores
Source	Rating
AllMusic	3/5 stars
ARTISTdirect	1.5/5 stars
Robert Christgau	(2-star Honorable Mention)
The Guardian	3/5 stars
IGN	(5.5/10.0)
PopMatters	2/10 stars
RapReviews	(4.5/10)
Rolling Stone	2/5 stars

iSouljaBoyTellem received negative reviews from music critics, who felt that it was recycled material from his previous album. AllMusic's David Jeffries said that the album came up short when trying to re-create the success of "Crank That" but praised "Shopping Spree" in that it "suggests some crossover hopes and desire for hardcore rap acceptance." Steve 'Flash' Juon of RapReviews said that the music "improved drastically" but still found the lyrics to be "as vapid and materialistic as it was before," concluding with, "Your best bet is to find a website you can listen to snippets of this album on and if one or two tracks strike your fancy, buy those. A whole album of SB's idiotic raps is still too much for one man or woman to take no matter how much better the beats are." Writing for Rolling Stone, Christian Hoard also commented on how the beats were more bulky but the delivery in the songs lacked charm in them. BBC Music commented: “He's been accused of writing specifically for the lucrative ringtone market and his songs do seem to be about catchy ten second hooks which are then repeated ad infinitum. Still, it's difficult to knock a teenager who says his aim is to make non-violent rap about partying and having fun.”

== Track listing ==
No.	Title	Writer(s)	Producer(s)	Length
1.	"I'm Bout tha Stax (Intro)"	DeAndre Way; Christopher Gholson	Drumma Boy	3:20
2.	"Bird Walk"	Way	Soulja Boy	3:33
3.	"Turn My Swag On"	Way; Antonio Randolph; Kelvin McConnell	Natural Disaster; Top Cat	3:26
4.	"Gucci Bandanna" (featuring Gucci Mane and Shawty Lo)	Way; Radric Davis; Carlos Walker	Soulja Boy	3:56
5.	"Eazy"	Way; Xavier Dotson	Zaytoven	3:22
6.	"Kiss Me thru the Phone" (featuring Sammie)	Way; James Scheffer; Michael Crooms; Sammie Bush, Jr.	Jim Jonsin; Mr. Collipark (co.)	3:13
7.	"Booty Got Swag (Donk Part 2)"	Way	Soulja Boy	3:06
8.	"Rubber Bands"	Way; Gholson	Drumma Boy	4:14
9.	"Hey You There"	Way	Soulja Boy	3:52
10.	"Yamaha Mama" (featuring Sean Kingston)	Jamal Jones; Lamar Taylor; Darnell Dalton; Christopher Brown; Way; Jasper Cameron; Dwayne Carter, Jr.; Bryan Williams; Kisean Anderson	Polow da Don	4:38
11.	"Wit My Yums On"	Way	Soulja Boy	3:28
12.	"Go Head" (featuring Juney Boomdata)	Way; Lorenzo Williams; D. Heard	Soulja Boy	3:41
13.	"Shoppin' Spree" (featuring Gucci Mane and Yo Gotti)	Way; Corey Dennard; Davis; Mario Mims	Mr. Hanky	4:46
14.	"Soulja Boy Tell 'Em"	Way; Jonathan Wright	John Boy	3:31
15.	"Whoop Rico" (featuring Show Stoppas)	Way; Jered Bullard; Montrez Camp; Michael Dawonde; Charles Perry; Harold Rogers	DJ GB	4:06
16.	"I Pray (Outro)"	Way; Gholson	Drumma Boy	5:48
Total length:				60:02

iTunes Store bonus track
No.	Title	Producer(s)	Length
17.	"Twerk Fest"	Mr. Hanky	3:39
Total length:			63:41

Sample credits

- "Yamaha Mama" contains a sample of "Stuntin' Like My Daddy", written and performed by Lil Wayne and Birdman.

== Personnel ==
Adapted from the iSouljaBoyTellem liner notes.

- Michael "Mr. ColliPark" Crooms: executive producer
- Derrick Crooms: Collipark Music A&R, Rockfort Management
- Kevin "Coach K" Lee: A&R
- Charlotte Crooms: Collipark Music Administrative Coordinator
- Phillip Ransom, Esq.: Music Legal Representation for Soulja Boy
- Karl Marcellus Washington, Esq.: Legal Representation for Collipark Music Inc.
- DJ Mormile & Manny Smith: Interscope A&R
- Kevin Black: A&R
- Orlando McGhee: A&R
- Terrence Nelson: A&R Coordinator
- Brian Washington: marketing director
- Ravid Yosef: All Things Mobile
- Aaron Foreman & Kendra Ellis: digital marketing
- Greg Miller: publicity
- Randy Sosin: video production
- Michael Cole & Jennifer Zeller: video promotion
- Don Robinson: international marketing
- Erika Savage: business affairs
- Ianthe Zevos: creative
- SLANG Inc.: art direction/design
- Zach Wolfe: photography
- Cliff Feiman: production supervisor

== Charts ==
=== Weekly charts ===
Chart (2008–2009)	Peak position
US Billboard 200	43
US Top R&B/Hip-Hop Albums (Billboard)	8
US Top Rap Albums (Billboard)	18

=== Year-end charts ===
Chart (2009)	Position
US Billboard 200	99
US Top R&B/Hip-Hop Albums	35
US Top Rap Albums	11
