= Bluestars (album) =

Studio album by Pretty Ricky
- Released: May 24, 2005
- Recorded: 2004–05
- Genres: R&B, hip-hop, Dirty rap
- Labels: Atlantic, Bluestar Ent.

Pretty Ricky chronology
Bluestars (2005)	Late Night Special (2007)

Singles from Bluestars
- 1. "Grind with Me" Released: March 14, 2005; 2. "Your Body" Released: June 15, 2005; 3. "Nothing but a Number" Released: January 12, 2006

Bluestars is the debut studio album by American R&B group Pretty Ricky. It was released on May 24, 2005 by Atlantic Records and Bluestar Entertainment. The record serves as their second release under their record label, called Bluestar Entertainment. The album was supported by three singles: "Grind with Me", "Your Body", and "Nothing but a Number". Bluestars debuted at number 16 on the US Billboard 200 and sold 56,000 units in its first week. To date, the album was certified gold by the Recording Industry Association of America (RIAA).

== Critical reception ==
Professional ratings
Review scores
Source	Rating
AllMusic	2.5/5 stars

AllMusic's Andy Kellman felt that Pretty Ricky's sexual content paled in comparison to fellow artists like Usher and the Ying Yang Twins due to lackluster writing, concluding that, "[T]he group has more talent than it leads you to believe. Maybe they won't be so hungry for street credibility on album number two." Azeem Ahmed of musicOMH also found the sex jams monotonous after the fourth track and came across as "vain attempts" to copy Usher and 112, but gave credit to "Grill 'Em" and "Chevy" for taking the group out of their usual soundscape to elevate their musical range and material, concluding that, "Had Bluestars demonstrated a desire beyond mere commercial success and focused on credibility this could have been an impressive piece of work. Instead it is a product that will command sales but will suffer the test of time."

== Track listing ==
No.	Title	Writer(s)	Producer(s)	Length
1.	"Playhouse"	Diamond Smith; Joseph Smith; Spectacular Smith; Marcus Cooper; Corey Mathis; James Scheffer; Derrick Baker	Jim Jonsin; Big D	4:13
2.	"Your Body"	D. Smith; J. Smith; S. Smith; Cooper; Mathis; Scheffer; Baker; Static Major	Jim Jonsin; Big D; Troy Taylor^{[a]}	4:00
3.	"Grind with Me"	D. Smith; J. Smith; S. Smith; Cooper; Mathis; Scheffer; Baker	Jim Jonsin; Big D	3:59
4.	"Get a Little Closer"	D. Smith; J. Smith; S. Smith; Cooper; Mathis; Aeneas Middleton	Hardley Davidson	4:31
5.	"Never Let You Go"	D. Smith; J. Smith; S. Smith; Cooper; Mathis; Scheffer; Baker; Jason Boyd; Major; David Lee Roth; Eddie Van Halen; Alex Van Halen; Michael Anthony	Jim Jonsin; Big D	3:47
6.	"Juicy" (featuring Static Major)	D. Smith; J. Smith; S. Smith; Cooper; Mathis; Scheffer; Baker; Major; Teddy Riley; Keith Sweat	Jim Jonsin; Big D; Troy Taylor^{[a]}	4:48
7.	"Call Me"	D. Smith; J. Smith; S. Smith; Cooper; Mathis; Major; Can Canatan; Roberto Martorell	Can "Stress" Canatan	3:54
8.	"Nothing but a Number"	D. Smith; J. Smith; S. Smith; Cooper; Mathis; Scheffer; Baker	Jim Jonsin; Big D; Troy Taylor^{[a]}	4:59
9.	"Grill 'Em"	D. Smith; J. Smith; S. Smith; Cooper; Mathis	Pretty Ricky; Jonathon "Sarcazm" Smith; Joseph "Blue" Smith^{[b]}	4:15
10.	"Get You Right"	D. Smith; J. Smith; S. Smith; Cooper; Mathis; Major; Troy Taylor	Troy Taylor; Static Major	4:29
11.	"Chevy"	D. Smith; S. Smith; Cooper; Mathis; Scheffer; Baker; Major	Jim Jonsin; Big D	4:05
12.	"I Want You (Girlfriend)"	D. Smith; J. Smith; S. Smith; Cooper; Mathis	Pretty Ricky; Total Kaos; Joseph "Blue" Smith^{[b]}; Jim Jonsin^{[b]}; Big D^{[b]}	3:15
13.	"Shorty Be Mine"	D. Smith; J. Smith; S. Smith; Cooper; Mathis; Scheffer; Baker	Jim Jonsin; Big D; Troy Taylor^{[a]}	4:09
14.	"Can't Live Without You"	D. Smith; J. Smith; S. Smith; Cooper; Mathis; Scheffer; Baker	Jim Jonsin; Big D; Troy Taylor^{[a]}	4:49
15.	"So Fresh So Clean" (featuring C. Miller)			4:30

Notes

- ^{^[a]} signifies a vocal producer
- ^{^[b]} signifies a co-producer

== Charts ==
=== Weekly charts ===
Chart (2005)	Peak position
US Billboard 200	16
US Top R&B/Hip-Hop Albums (Billboard)	5

=== Year-end charts ===
Chart (2005)	Position
US Billboard 200	104
US Top R&B/Hip-Hop Albums (Billboard)	38

== Certifications ==
Region	Certification	Certified units/sales
United States (RIAA)	Gold	500,000^{^}
^{^} Shipments figures based on certification alone.
