= Jim Jonsin =

American record producer (born 1970)

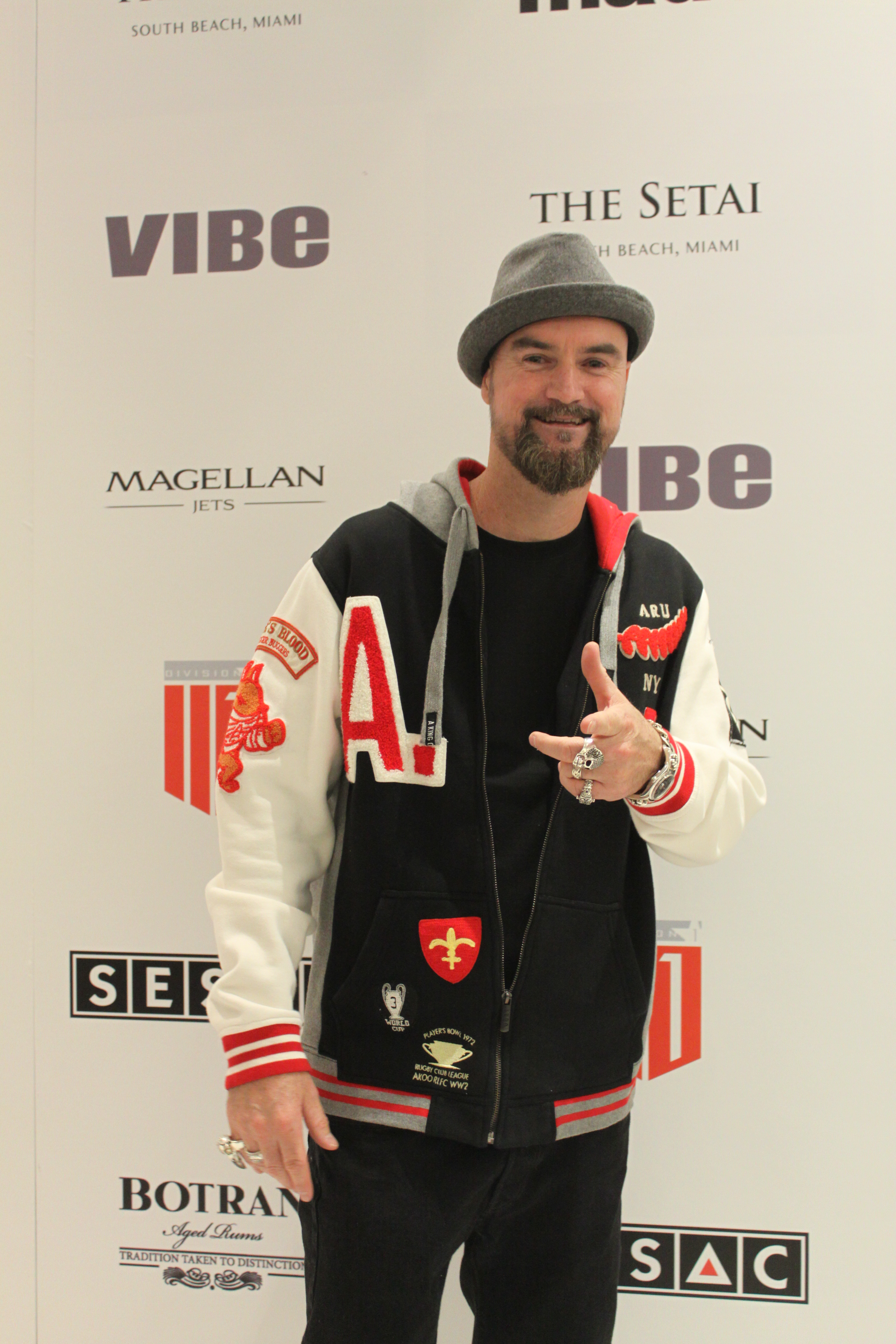
- Jonsin in 2010

Background information
- Born: James Gregory Scheffer; June 8, 1970 (age 56); Brooklyn, New York City, U.S.
- Origin: South Florida, U.S.
- Genres: Hip hop; Southern hip hop; R&B; snap; pop; dance pop; electro; electro pop
- Occupations: Record producer; songwriter
- Years active: 1988–present
- Label: Rebel Rock
- Website: rebelrock.com

James Gregory Scheffer (born June 8, 1970), known professionally as Jim Jonsin, is an American record producer and songwriter from South Florida. He has produced for numerous musical artists, including Beyoncé, Kelly Rowland, Usher, Lil Wayne, Kid Cudi, Eminem, Pitbull, Yelawolf, Nelly, Mary J. Blige, Wiz Khalifa, Danity Kane and Jamie Foxx, among others. He won a Grammy Award for his work on Lil Wayne's 2008 single "Lollipop," and received a nomination for Best Rap Album for his work on "Whatever You Like" by T.I. that same year. Furthermore, both songs peaked the Billboard Hot 100.

Jonsin's productions have been on other Grammy Award-winning albums such as Beyoncé's I Am... Sasha Fierce (2010 Best Contemporary R&B album), Lil Wayne's Tha Carter III (2008 Best Rap Album), Usher's Raymond v. Raymond (2011 Best Contemporary R&B album), and Usher's "There Goes My Baby" (2011 Best Male R&B Vocal Performance), and Eminem's Recovery (2011 Best Rap Album and Album of the Year).

Jonsin launched the record label Rebel Rock Entertainment in 2006, through which he signed then-unknown rapper B.o.B that same year. Jonsin's label partnered with Atlantic Records and later T.I.'s Grand Hustle Records to release B.o.B.'s debut album, The Adventures of Bobby Ray (2010). The album debuted atop the Billboard 200, and was followed by Strange Clouds (2012) and Underground Luxury (2013). Jonsin signed other acts to the label including singer Leroy Sanchez, as well as fellow producers FnZ, Danny Morris, and Frank Romano.

Outside of music, he entered into the field of professional racing in February 2012 and formed his own motorsports team, Rebel Rock Racing. Jonsin drove a Porsche 911 in the Grand-am Road Racing series with co-driver D.J. Randall that same year.

== Music career ==
In the late 1990s, Jonsin was no longer on tour and returned to Miami to produce more bass records, and ultimately landed a position as an engineer at the locally-based Slip-N-Slide Records. From his tenure, Jonsin produced songs for Trick Daddy and Trina. Jonsin wrote and produced the former's 2004 single "Let's Go" (featuring Lil Jon and Twista). Soon after the success of this song, Jonsin began working with Miami native Pitbull and produced his 2004 single "Dammit Man" from the rapper's debut album M.I.A.M.I., which received gold certification by the RIAA. The music industry began to take notice of the Miami-based producer, and Jonsin was tapped by Bad Boy Records to produce for the group Danity Kane, who were made popular from the MTV reality series Making the Band. Jonsin produced their 2006 single "Show Stopper", which peaked at number eight on the Billboard Hot 100.

Jonsin saw his furthest success for his production on Lil Wayne's 2008 single "Lollipop", which peaked the Billboard Hot 100, received diamond certification by the RIAA, and won a Grammy Award for Best Rap Song. In that same year, Jonsin found similar success with his work on T.I.'s single "Whatever You Like". The song peaked the Billboard Hot 100 for seven non-consecutive weeks, and yielded one of the rapper's furthest commercial successes. "Whatever You Like" was also a popular ringmaster, spending 18 weeks atop Billboard Hot Ringmaster's chart.

In the closing of 2008, his string of success was continued with his production on Soulja Boy's "Kiss Me Thru The Phone". The song was downloaded over 2 million times and was also a popular ringmaster, spending 11 weeks atop the Billboard Hot Ringmaster's chart. The song peaked at number three on the Billboard Hot 100.

In 2009, Jonsin co-produced the single "Sweet Dreams" by American singer Beyoncé. The song was the sixth single from her Grammy Award-winning album, I Am… Sasha Fierce. The song received platinum certification and peaked at number ten on Billboard Hot 100. Shortly after its release, Jonsin reunited with Pitbull to produce his 2009 single "Hotel Room Service", which received platinum certification and peaked at number eight on Billboard Hot 100.

The summer of 2010 proved to be another high point for Jonsin's career. On August 16 Nelly released "Just a Dream", co-produced by Jonsin. The song received platinum certification and peaked at number three on the Billboard Hot 100. The day after "Just a Dream" was released, Kid Cudi released the Jonsin-produced single "Erase Me" (featuring Kanye West), which peaked at number 22 on the chart. Released that August, Jonsin wrote and produced American Idol winner Fantasia's single "Falling In Love Tonight", from her Grammy Award-nominated album Back To Me.

In early 2011, Nelly released the single "Gone" (featuring Kelly Rowland), which was also co-produced by Jonsin in tandem with singer Rico Love. The song is a follow-up to Nelly's 2002 single, "Dilemma". Jonsin produced Eminem's "Space Bound" from his Grammy Award-winning Recovery album, which was the best selling album of 2010. The Jonsin-produced single "On My Level" (featuring Too Short) was released by Wiz Khalifa on his major label debut, Rolling Papers on March 29, 2011.

== Ventures ==
=== Rebel Rock Entertainment ===
Jonsin founded his record label, Rebel Rock Entertainment, in 2006. He signed Georgia-based rapper B.o.B as the label's first artist. B.o.B's 2009 debut single, "Nothin' on You" (featuring Bruno Mars), peaked atop the Billboard Hot 100 and received three Grammy Award nominations. His 2010 follow-up single, "Airplanes" (featuring Hayley Williams), peaked at number two on the chart. His third single, "Magic" (featuring Rivers Cuomo), peaked at number ten; all three served as lead singles for his debut studio album, The Adventures of Bobby Ray (2010), which was executive produced by Jonsin and peaked atop the Billboard 200. Jonsin also chose "Nothing On You" as the album's lead single.

B.o.B. garnered several awards in late 2010 and early 2011. The rapper was nominated for five awards at the 53rd Annual Grammy Awards. Furthermore, he was nominated for three American Music Awards, three BET Awards, 7 BET Hip Hop Awards, four MTV Video Music Awards, and a MTV Europe Music Award. B.o.B won the 2010 Soul Train Awards for Best Song "Nothin' On You" and was nominated for Best New Artist. B.o.B won the 2010 Teen Choice Awards Hook Up Song for "Airplanes" and was nominated for five others.

=== Rebel Rock Productions ===
Jonsin signed three producers, FnZ—an Australian production duo, and Danny Morris to his production company, Rebel Rock Productions. Danny Morris has worked with Jonsin on several releases including Usher's "There Goes My Baby", and "Making Love (Into the Night)", Fantasia's "Falling In Love Tonight", Kelly Rowland's "Take Everything" and "Motivation", Tank's "Scream", N Dubz's "Girls" and Wiz Khalifa's "On My Level". Finatik and Zac also have some upcoming releases for the Def Jam artist Wax ("Two Wheels/DUI") and the Universal Records artist Pac Div ("Loose").

=== Rebel Made ===
Jonsin formed Rebel Made Publishing Company in 2009 as a venture with his management team, Made. Writers signed to Rebel Made's roster include Terence Reid, formerly of The Network, along with fellow producers Finatik and Zac and Danny Morris.

=== Rebel Rock Racing ===
In 2010, Jonsin formed a racing team named Rebel Rock Racing, composed of him, Bucky Lasek (Pro Skateboarder and ten time X Games gold medalist) and Marius Avemarg (pro driver from Germany). The race team is supported by its ambassadors, Pitbull, Kyle Loza, and Yelawolf and sponsors such as Beats by Dre and Oakley.

=== American Idol ===
Jonsin appeared on the 10th season of American Idol in 2011. Jonsin was handpicked by Interscope's Jimmy Iovine as one of a handful of producers to serve as mentors to the contestants, working with them to produce and record cover songs for sale on iTunes.

== Musical influences and techniques ==
Jonsin has cited DJ Jazzy Jeff and Jam Master Jay as strong musical influences on his style and has been known to use an MPC 3000, a Roland TR 808, and an Access Virus TI as his preferred gear.

== Personal life ==
Jim Jonsin was born in Brooklyn, New York City but was raised in South Florida. Jonsin's first job in the music business was as a scratch DJ. At the age of 14, Jonsin was spinning records at local skating rinks and other venues. By 18 Jonsin had graduated to spinning at Miami and South Florida dance clubs and formed his own record label called Cut It Up Def Records and produced one of its first singles, "Cut It Up Def" which independently sold 40,000 units. Jonsin had become well known in the region by the time he released his next production, the single "Party Time", which he also rapped on.

Jonsin's success in South Florida led him to a deal with California-based Heat Wave Records. Going by his new artist moniker, DJ Jealous J, he released a compilation of Miami bass songs titled Miami Bass Jams. The first two singles from the collection were certified Gold. Jonsin went on to tour with some of the most popular acts of the time such as Cypress Hill, 2 Live Crew, and Marky Mark and the Funky Bunch.

== Discography ==
=== Singles produced ===
List of singles as either producer or co-producer, with selected chart positions and certifications, showing year released, performing artists and album name
Title	Year	Peak chart positions										Certifications	Album
Title	Year	US	US R&B	US Rap	AUS	CAN	GER	IRL	NZ	SWI	UK	Certifications	Album
"Let's Go" (Trick Daddy featuring Twista and Lil' Jon)	2004	7	10	4	35	—	—	27	—	—	26	RIAA: Gold	Thug Matrimony: Married to the Streets
"Dammit Man" (Pitbull)	2004	119	58	—	—	—	—	—	—	—	—		M.I.A.M.I.
"Grind With Me" (Pretty Ricky)	2005	7	6	2	—	—	—	—	6	—	26	RIAA: Platinum	Bluestars
"Your Body" (Pretty Ricky)	2005	12	22	5	45	—	—	—	13	—	37	RIAA: Gold	Bluestars
"Unpredictable" Jamie Foxx featuring Ludacris	2005	8	2	—	22	—	—	26	13	85	16	RIAA: Platinum	Unpredictable
"Show Stopper" (Danity Kane featuring Yung Joc)	2006	8	33	—	—	—	27	—	—	—	—	RIAA: Gold	Danity Kane
"Leather So Soft" (Birdman and Lil Wayne)	2006	118	41	16	—	—	—	—	—	—	—		Like Father, Like Son
"Lollipop" (Lil Wayne)	2008	1	1	1	32	10	22	28	3	39	26	RIAA: Diamond; RMNZ: Platinum	Tha Carter III
"Whatever You Like" (T.I.)	2008	1	1	1	13	12	57	19	1	—	47	RIAA: 8× Platinum; RMNZ: Platinum	Paper Trail
"Kiss Me Thru the Phone" (Soulja Boy featuring Sammie)	2008	3	4	1	16	10	—	11	2	88	6		iSouljaBoyTellEm
"Sweet Dreams" (Beyoncé)	2009	10	48	—	2	17	8	4	1	16	5	RIAA: 3× Platinum; ARIA: Platinum; BPI: Gold; RMNZ: Platinum	I Am… Sasha Fierce
"Hotel Room Service" (Pitbull)	2009	8	7	—	11	7	22	29	—	11	9	RIAA: 2× Platinum; ARIA: Platinum; BPI: Silver; MC: 2× Platinum	Rebelution
"There Goes My Baby" (Usher)	2010	25	1	—	—	—	—	—	—	—	138		Raymond v. Raymond
"Just a Dream" (Nelly)	2010	3	—	6	3	5	17	8	5	22	8	RIAA: 4× Platinum; ARIA: 3× Platinum; BPI: Gold; IFPI SWE: Gold; IFPI SWI: Gold; RMNZ: Platinum	5.0
"Erase Me" (Kid Cudi featuring Kanye West)	2010	22	51	—	50	12	—	—	22	—	58	RIAA: 2× Platinum	Man on the Moon II: The Legend of Mr. Rager
"Girls" (N-Dubz)	2010	—	—	—	—	—	—	48	—	—	18		Love.Live.Life
"Space Bound" (Eminem)	2011	119	—	—	51	—	—	31	—	—	34	RIAA: Gold	Recovery
"On My Level" (Wiz Khalifa featuring Too Short)	2011	52	30	19	—	96	—	—	—	—	—	RIAA: Platinum	Rolling Papers
"Motivation" (Kelly Rowland featuring Lil Wayne)	2011	17	1	—	—	99	—	—	—	—	169	RIAA: 2× Platinum	Here I Am
"Right There" (Nicole Scherzinger featuring 50 Cent)	2011	39	—	—	8	44	61	7	7	—	3		Killer Love
"Mr. Wrong" (Mary J. Blige featuring Drake)	2011	87	10	—	—	—	—	—	—	—	—		My Life II... The Journey Continues (Act 1)
"No More" (LL Cool J featuring Ne-Yo)	2011	124	87	—	—	—	—	—	—	—	—		Non-album single
"Lemme See" (Usher featuring Rick Ross)	2012	46	2	—	—	—	—	—	—	—	90		Looking 4 Myself
"Pay Attention" (Big K.R.I.T. featuring Rico Love)	2014	—	—	—	—	—	—	—	—	—	—		Cadillactica
"L$D" (ASAP Rocky)	2015	62	20	—	83	90	—	—	—	—	—	RIAA: 3× Platinum	At. Long. Last. ASAP
"—" denotes a recording that did not chart or was not released in that territory.

== Awards and nominations ==
- 2006 BMI Urban Songwriter of the Year
- 2006 BMI Urban Award for "Grind with Me", "Let's Go", and "Your Body"
- 2006 BMI London Awards – Urban Award for "Here We Go"
- 2007 BMI Urban Awards for "Girl Tonite", "Here We Go", and "Unpredictable"
- 2008 Grammy Award – Best Rap Song – "Lollipop"
- 2009 BMI Creative Inspiration Producer Award
- 2009 BMI Urban Award for "Lollipop"
- 2009 Billboard #3 Hot 100 Producer of the Year
- 2009 Grammy Award nomination Album of the Year – Beyoncé – I Am… Sasha Fierce
- 2010 BMI Pop Award for "Whatever You Like"
- 2010 BMI Urban Awards for "Hotel Room Service" and "Kiss Me Thru The Phone"
- 2010 BMI London Awards – Pop Awards for "Hotel Room Service" and "Sweet Dreams"
- 2010 Billboard #16 R&B/Hip-Hop Producer of the Year
- 2010 Grammy Award nomination Album of the Year – Eminem – Recovery
