= Grind with Me =

"Grind With Me"

Single by Pretty Ricky

from the album Bluestars
- Released: March 14, 2005
- Genre: Hip hop; R&B; Dirty rap
- Length: 3:59
- Label: Atlantic
- Songwriter: Static Major/D. Smith/J. Smith/S. Smith/M. Cooper/C. Mathis/J. Scheffer/D. Baker
- Producer: Jim Jonsin

Pretty Ricky singles chronology
"Grind With Me" (2005)	"Your Body" (2005)

"Grind with Me" is the debut single by the American R&B group Pretty Ricky. It was released on March 14, 2005, as the lead single from their debut studio album Bluestars (2005). The single reached #7 on the Billboard Hot 100 and was certified platinum by the RIAA, becoming the group's first top ten Billboard Hot 100 single. The song was included in the 2005 film Deuce Bigalow: European Gigolo.

A remix version featured a verse by rapper White Dawg, while an explicit version of the track was titled "Grind On Me" and contained more adult lyrics.

== Music Video ==
The music video premiered on 106 & Park on April 13, 2005

== Track listings ==
- CD 1
1. "Grind With Me"
2. "Everybody Get Up" (featuring Pitbull)
- Enhanced CD 2
1. "Grind With Me"
2. "Grind With Me" (Instrumental)
3. "Everybody Get Up" (featuring Pitbull)
4. "Grind With Me" (Video)
5. "Grind With Me" (VB)

== Charts ==
=== Weekly charts ===
Chart (2005)	Peak position
Australia (ARIA)	70
Australian Urban (ARIA)	26
Netherlands (Urban Top 100)	31
New Zealand (Recorded Music NZ)	6
Scottish Singles Sales (Official Charts)	62
UK Singles (Official Charts)	26
UK Hip Hop/R&B (Official Charts)	3
US Billboard Hot 100	7
US Hot R&B/Hip-Hop Songs (Billboard)	6
US Pop Airplay (Billboard)	17

=== Year-end charts ===
Chart (2005)	Position
US Billboard Hot 100	41
US Hot R&B/Hip-Hop Songs (Billboard)	42

== Release history ==
Region	Date	Format(s)	Label	Ref.
United States	March 14, 2005	Rhythmic contemporary radio	Atlantic	
United States	March 14, 2005	Urban contemporary radio	Atlantic	
United States	April 8, 2005	Digital download	Atlantic	
