= Pretty Ricky =

American R&B group from Florida

- Also known as: Pretty Rickie and The Maverix
- Origin: Miami, Florida, U.S.
- Genres: R&B; pop rap
- Years active: 1997–2011; 2015–present
- Labels: Atlantic; Big Cat; Tommy Boy; Bluestar
- Producer(s): Jim Jonsin; Static Major
- Members: Marcus "Pleasure P" Cooper "Spectacular" Blue Smith; Diamond "Baby Blue" Smith
- Past members: Christopher Myers ("4Play"); Carl Lovett ("Mowet"); Emmanuel Ramone DeAnda ("Lingerie"); Robert ("Milk B") Baish; Corey "Slick'em" Mathis

Pretty Ricky is an American R&B/hip hop group originating from Miami, Florida. The group originally consisted of two brothers, Diamond (Baby Blue) Smith, Spectacular Smith, their cousin Corey (Slick 'Em) Mathis, and an unrelated member, Marcus (Pleasure P) Cooper. Pleasure P was the group's main singer, while the other three members performed as rappers. After he departed in 2007 to embark on a solo career, the group shuffled through several replacement vocalists.

The name "Pretty Ricky" was taken from a character in the sitcom Martin. The group enjoyed its biggest success in the mid-2000s with their gold-selling albums Bluestars and Late Night Special, and the platinum singles "Grind With Me" and "On the Hotline".

== History ==
=== 1997–2003: Beginnings ===
In 1997, while performing together in Miami, Pretty Ricky was signed to Bluestar Entertainment by CEO Joseph "Blue" Smith. Supported by their father, Joseph Smith Sr., who also served as the band's manager and who is of Jamaican descent, the group developed their music under the name of "Pretty Rickie and The Maverix" before changing it to "Pretty Ricky", with the group being named after a character played by Miguel A. Nunez Jr. on the TV show Martin. With the help from producer Jim Jonsin of the Unusual Suspects production team, Pretty Ricky began to gain desirable attention through their local performances. However, it was not until 2002 that the group encountered their initial success as their song "Flossin'" became a huge hit on Miami radio station Power 96.

=== 2004–2005: Bluestars ===
In 2004, Pretty Ricky released their first official single, "Grind With Me". It reached No. 7 on the Billboard Hot 100, and was certified Platinum by the Recording Industry Association of America (RIAA).

The single made its way to popularity on WPOW-Power 96, and station program director Ira Wolf (Tony the Tiger) sent the single to Craig Kallman of Atlantic Records. After auditioning with Kallman, Pretty Ricky was offered a record deal on the spot.

On May 17, 2005, Pretty Ricky released their debut album titled Bluestars. It debuted at No. 16 on the Billboard 200 chart, selling 56,000 copies in the first week, and within several months, was certified Gold by RIAA. On June 15, 2005, Pretty Ricky released their second single from the album, "Your Body", which charted on the Billboard Hot 100 at #12. In the summer of 2005 the group toured with Omarion, Bow Wow, Marques Houston, Bobby V, and other acts in the Scream Tour IV concert series.

=== 2006–2011: Late Night Special, Pleasure P's departure and disbandment ===
On November 9, 2006, Pretty Ricky released the first single off their second album, Late Night Special, titled "On the Hotline". It peaked on the Billboard Hot 100 at No. 97 and was certified platinum by the RIAA. In January 2007, Late Night Special topped the Billboard 200 album charts with over 132,000 copies sold in the first week. The second single from the album, "Push It Baby", featured Sean Paul but failed to crack the Hot 100, reaching only No. 109. Pleasure P later left the group after, and was replaced by Carl "Mowet" Lovett and soon after Christopher "4Play" Myers in 2007.

In 2008, Pretty Ricky began work on a new album, Eighties Babies, with an intended release date of October 14, 2008, but the album was shelved due to leaking and creative differences. 4Play quit the group in 2009 and was replaced by Emanuel "Lingerie" DeAnda. Pretty Ricky then split from Atlantic and signed with independent Atlanta label Big Cat Records, who released their official third album, Pretty Ricky, in November 2009. It charted for only one week on the Billboard 200, at #97.

In 2010, Pretty Ricky released the singles "Personal Freak" and "Cookie Cutter", neither of which charted. On August 10, 2010, they released an extended play titled Topless. In December 2010, the group announced their fourth album, Bluestars 2, was in the works, but the album was never produced. On August 12, 2011, Pretty Ricky released a mixtape titled Sex Music Vol. 1: Streets N The Sheets.

=== 2015–present: Reformation, Love & Hip Hop Miami, and continuation as a trio ===
After a three-year hiatus, Pretty Ricky released the non-charting single "Puddles" on February 16, 2015. Returning members included Pleasure P, Spectacular, Baby Blue, and Slick'em.

In 2018, Pleasure P, Spectacular, and Baby Blue started appearing on VH1's reality series Love & Hip Hop Miami, and remained until the show's second season. In 2019, Pretty Ricky joined The Millennium Tour along with B2K, Mario, Chingy, Ying Yang Twins, Lloyd, and Bobby Valentino. On February 21, 2020, Pretty Ricky returned with a new single titled "Body", which is set to appear on the group's reunion album.

In 2022, Baby Blue pleaded guilty to participating in a scheme to file at least 79 fraudulent loan applications seeking more than $24 million in forgivable PPP loans. Baby Blue used the loan proceeds to make "luxury purchases", including a Ferrari for $96,000.

In May 2025, Spectacular announced the group would continue as a trio without Slick'em's involvement due to his refusal to seek help at a rehabilitation treatment center for his addiction issues.

== Discography ==
=== Studio albums ===
List of albums, with selected chart positions
Title	Album details	Peak chart positions			Certifications
Title	Album details	US	US R&B	US Rap	Certifications
Bluestars	Released: May 24, 2005; Label: Bluestar Ent., Atlantic; Formats: CD, MD, LP	16	5	3	RIAA: Gold
Late Night Special	Released: January 23, 2007; Label: Bluestar Ent., Atlantic; Formats: CD, MD, LP	1	1	1	RIAA: Gold
Pretty Ricky	Released: November 17, 2009; Label: Bluestar Ent., Big Cat, Tommy Boy; Formats: CD, MD, LP	97	14	—	

=== Unreleased albums ===
Title	Details
What They Call Em	Released: July 8, 2003; Label: Superstar Entertainment; Formats: CD, LP

=== EPs ===
Title	Details
Topless	Released: August 10, 2010; Label: Bluestar Ent.; Format: MD

=== Mixtapes ===
Mixtapes
Title	Details
Sex Music Vol. 1: Streets N The Sheets	Released: August 12, 2011; Label: Bluestar Ent.

=== Singles ===
Year	Title	Chart positions							Certification	Album
Year	Title	US	US R&B	US Rap	AUS	FIN	NZ	UK	Certification	Album
2005	"Grind With Me"	7	6	2	70	—	6	26	RIAA: Platinum; RMNZ: Platinum	Bluestars
2005	"Your Body"	12	22	5	45	—	13	37	RIAA: Gold; RMNZ: Platinum	Bluestars
2006	"Nothing but a Number"	—	70	—	—	—	—	—	RMNZ: Gold	Bluestars
2006	"On the Hotline"	12	6	—	—	—	—	121	RIAA: Platinum; RMNZ: Platinum	Late Night Special
2007	"Push It Baby" (featuring Sean Paul)	102	51	18	—	2	—	120		Late Night Special
2007	"Love Like Honey"	—	101	—	—	—	—	—		Late Night Special
2007	"Wet Dreams" (featuring Butta Creame)	—	—	—	—	—	—	—		Late Night Special
2008	"Knockin' Boots 08"	—	75	—	—	—	—	—		Eighties Babies (unreleased)
2008	"Cuddle Up" (featuring Butta Creame)	—	76	—	—	—	—	—		Eighties Babies (unreleased)
2008	"Shonin"	—	—	—	—	—	—	—		Eighties Babies (unreleased)
2008	"Marry Me"	—	—	—	—	—	—	—		Eighties Babies (unreleased)
2008	"XXL"	—	—	—	—	—	—	—		Eighties Babies (unreleased)
2009	"Tipsy (In Dis Club)"	18	52	—	—	—	—	—		Pretty Ricky
2009	"Say a Command"	—	98	—	—	—	—	—		Pretty Ricky
2010	"Personal Freak" (J. Long featuring Pretty Ricky)	—	—	—	—	—	—	—		Non-album singles
2010	"Cookie Cutter"	—	—	—	—	—	—	—		Non-album singles
2011	"Topless"	—	124	—	—	—	—	—		Non-album singles
2015	"Puddles"	—	—	—	—	—	—	—		Non-album singles
2017	"Good Girlz"	—	—	—	—	—	—	—		Non-album singles
2020	"Body"	—	—	—	—	—	—	—		Non-album singles
