= Ying Yang Twins discography =

This is the discography of American rap duo Ying Yang Twins.

== Albums ==
=== Studio albums ===
List of albums, with selected chart positions and certifications
Title	Album details	Peak chart positions					Certifications
Title	Album details	US	US Ind.	US R&B	US Rap	GER	Certifications
Thug Walkin'	Released: April 25, 2000; Label: ColliPark (#1006), Universal (#159914); Format: CD, LP, cassette, digital download	—	—	54	—	—	
Alley: The Return of the Ying Yang Twins	Released: March 26, 2002; Label: Koch (#8375); Format: CD, LP, cassette, digital download	58	2	8	—	—	
Me & My Brother	Released: September 16, 2003; Label: TVT (#2480); Format: CD, LP, cassette, digital download	11	1	4	—	—	RIAA: Platinum
U.S.A. (United State of Atlanta)	Released: June 28, 2005; Label: TVT; Format: CD, digital download	2	1	1	1	94	RIAA: Platinum
Chemically Imbalanced	Released: November 28, 2006; Label: TVT; Format: CD, digital download	40	1	8	6	—	
Ying Yang Forever	Released: September 1, 2009; Label: Deep; Format: CD, digital download	—	—	—	—	—	
"—" denotes a recording that did not chart or was not released in that territory.

=== Compilation albums ===
List of albums, with selected chart positions
Title	Album details	Peak chart positions			
Title	Album details	US	US Ind.	US R&B	US Rap
My Brother & Me	Released: November 2, 2004; Label: TVT; Format: CD, digital download	12	1	6	4
U.S.A. Still United	Released: December 27, 2005; Label: TVT; Format: CD, digital download	45	1	16	8
Legendary Status: Ying Yang Twins Greatest Hits	Released: November 3, 2009; Label: TVT; Format: CD, digital download	—	—	—	—
Gumbo Vol. 1	Released: June 22, 2010; Label: Punnn!!!; Format: CD, digital download	—	—	—	—
Gumbo Vol. 2	Released: November 3, 2010; Label: Punnn!!!; Format: CD, digital download	—	—	—	—
All Around the World	Released: September 28, 2012; Label: TDO / Kingston; Format: CD, digital download	—	—	—	—
"—" denotes a recording that did not chart.

=== Mixtapes ===
List of albums, with selected chart positions
Title	Album details	Peak chart positions		
Title	Album details	US Ind.	US R&B	US Rap
The Official Work	Released: August 26, 2008; Label: BCD; Format: CD, digital download	49	39	19

== Singles ==
=== As lead artist ===
List of singles, with selected chart positions, showing year released and album name
Title	Year	Peak chart positions								Certifications	Album
Title	Year	US	US R&B	US Rap	AUS	BEL (FL)	GER	NL	UK	Certifications	Album
"Whistle While You Twurk"	2000	74	16	1	—	—	—	—	—		Thug Walkin'
"Ying Yang in This Thang" (featuring Hoodratz)	2000	—	107	—	—	—	—	—	—		Thug Walkin'
"Say I Yi Yi"	2002	56	22	10	—	—	—	—	—	RIAA: Gold	Alley: The Return of the Ying Yang Twins
"By Myself"	2002	—	40	25	—	—	—	—	—		Alley: The Return of the Ying Yang Twins
"Naggin'"	2003	87	43	21	75	—	—	—	—		Me & My Brother
"Salt Shaker" (featuring Lil Jon & the East Side Boyz)	2003	9	9	2	75	—	87	—	—		Me & My Brother
"Georgia Dome (Get Low Sequel)"	2004	—	—	—	—	—	—	—	—		Me & My Brother
"What's Happenin!" (featuring Trick Daddy)	2004	30	24	9	—	—	—	—	—		Me & My Brother
"Halftime (Stand Up & Get Crunk!)" (featuring Homebwoi)	2004	—	—	—	—	—	—	—	—		My Brother & Me
"Wait (The Whisper Song)"	2005	15	3	2	67	52	59	41	47		U.S. (United State of Atlanta)
"Badd" (featuring Mike Jones and Mr. Collipark)	2005	29	16	6	—	—	—	—	—		U.S. (United State of Atlanta)
"Shake" (featuring Pitbull)	2005	41	37	12	—	—	—	—	49		U.S. (United State of Atlanta)
"Bedroom Boom" (featuring Avant)	2006	—	50	—	—	—	—	—	—		U.S. (United State of Atlanta)
"Dangerous" (featuring Wyclef Jean)	2006	85	84	—	98	—	82	—	—		Chemically Imbalanced
"—" denotes a recording that did not chart or was not released in that territory.

=== As featured performer ===
List of singles, with selected chart positions, showing year released and album name
Title	Year	Peak chart positions			Certifications	Album
Title	Year	US	US R&B	US Rap	Certifications	Album
"Twurkulator Part II" (DJ Kizzy Rock featuring B.G., Ying Yang Twins, and Gar)	2003	—	106	—		Non-album single
"Get Low" (Lil Jon & The East Side Boyz featuring Ying Yang Twins)	2003	2	2	1	BPI: Platinum	Kings of Crunk
"Row Da Boat" (Don Yute featuring Ying Yang Twins)	2004	—	94	—		Non-album single
"In Da Club" (Yonnie featuring Ying Yang Twins)	2004	—	—	—		My Brother & Me
"Ms. New Booty" (Bubba Sparxxx featuring Ying Yang Twins and Mr. Collipark)	2006	7	7	3		The Charm
"Git It" (Bun B featuring Ying Yang Twins)	2006	101	109	22		Trill
"All the Way (Live)" (Benny Benassi featuring Ying Yang Twins)	2011	—	—	—		Electroman
"Tell Daddy" (Maejor featuring Waka Flocka Flame & Ying Yang Twins)	2014	—	—	—		—N/a
"—" denotes a recording that did not chart or was not released in that territory.

== Guest appearances ==
- 1998: "One on One" (DJ Smurf featuring Ying Yang Twins)
- 2002: "Drop a Little Lower" (Baby D featuring Ying Yang Twins)
- 2003: "(I Got That) Boom Boom" (Britney Spears featuring Ying Yang Twins)
- 2003: "Shawty Thick" (Ice Mone featuring Ying Yang Twins)
- 2003: "Get Crunk Shorty" (Nick Cannon featuring Ying Yang Twins & Fatman Scoop)
- 2004: "Slow Motion (Remix)" (Juvenile featuring Wyclef Jean & Ying Yang Twins)
- 2004: "Down wit da South" (Trick Daddy featuring Trina, Ying Yang Twins & Deuce Komradz)
- 2004: "Stick Dat Thang Out (Skeezer)" (Lil Jon featuring Pharrell & Ying Yang Twins)
- 2004: "(I Got That) Boom Boom" (Collipark Remix) (Britney Spears featuring Ying Yang Twins)
- 2006: "Money Machine" (Nashawn featuring Nas, Jungle & Ying Yang Twins)
- 2008: "Sweep Da Flo" (Unk featuring Ying Yang Twins)
- 2010: "Ride Da D" (Lil Jon featuring Ying Yang Twins)
- 2013: "How We Party" (Tex James featuring Ying Yang Twins)
- 2013: "Smart Girl" (Remix) (Tex James featuring B.o.B, Stuey Rock & Ying Yang Twins)
- 2014: "Thirsty" (Pastor Troy featuring La Chat & Ying Yang Twins)
- 2016: "Badonk" (Pouya featuring Ying Yang Twins)
- 2018: "Left Right Left" (Mickie James featuring Ying Yang Twins)
- 2021: "Body Move (Remix)" (Dizzy Fae featuring Ying Yang Twins)
- 2024: "Don't Panic" (Paul Wall & Baby Bash feat. Ying Yang Twins)
