= U.S.A. Still United =

Compilation album (Mixtape) & DVD by Ying Yang Twins
- Released: December 27, 2005
- Recorded: 2005
- Genre: Southern hip hop, crunk
- Length: 46:11
- Label: TVT
- Producer: Lil Jon

Ying Yang Twins chronology
| U.S.A. (United State of Atlanta) (2005) | U.S.A. Still United (2005) | Chemically Imbalanced (2006) |

Professional ratings
Review scores
| Source | Rating |
|---|---|
| AllMusic | 3/5 stars |
| Okayplayer | 40/100 |
| RapReviews | 8/10 |

U.S.A. Still United is the second remix album by American hip hop duo Ying Yang Twins. It was released on December 27, 2005. The summer hit, "Wait (The Whisper Song)", is featured here in its remix version, as is the remix of the follow-up "Shake" with labelmate Pitbull and dancehall superstar Elephant Man. Also included is the most recent single "Bedroom Boom" featuring Avant, plus five previously unreleased songs.

== Track listing ==
| No. | Title | Writer(s) | Producer(s) | Length |
|---|---|---|---|---|
| 1. | "Mr. Collipark's Intro" | | | 0:52 |
| 2. | "Wiggle Then Move" | Michael Crooms; Deongelo Holmes; Eric Jackson | Mr. Collipark | 4:34 |
| 3. | "Ms. New Booty" (Bubba Sparxxx featuring Ying Yang Twins and Mr. Collipark) | Warren Mathis; M. Crooms; D. Holmes; E. Jackson | Mr. Collipark | 4:38 |
| 4. | "Git It" (Bun B featuring Ying Yang Twins) | Bernard Freeman; M. Crooms; D. Holmes; E. Jackson; Luther Campbell; David Hobbs; Mark Ross; Christopher Wong Won | | 3:57 |
| 5. | "Get Yern" (Muzicians featuring D-Roc) | D. Holmes; Brandon Sams; Courtney Holmes; Cheesie | Cheesie | 3:37 |
| 6. | "The Pink" | Henry Mancini | Mr. Collipark | 4:10 |
| 7. | "4 Oz." (featuring Three 6 Mafia) | Paul Beauregard; Jordan Houston; E. Jackson; D. Holmes | | 5:54 |
| 8. | "Legendary Status" (Homebwoi featuring Kadalack Boyz) | M. Crooms; Cobi Banks; Johnny Norman; James Davis; James Maddox | Mr. Collipark | 4:23 |
| 9. | "Bedroom Boom" (featuring Avant) | Michael Sterling; M. Crooms; D. Holmes; E. Jackson; Myron Avant | Mr. Collipark | 4:36 |
| 10. | "Duts" | M. Crooms; D. Holmes; E. Jackson | Mr. Collipark | 2:07 |
| 11. | "Wait (The Whisper Song) (Ultimix Remix)" | M. Crooms; D. Holmes; E. Jackson | Mr. Collipark; Stacy Mier | 5:42 |
| 12. | "Shake (Remix)" (featuring Pitbull and Elephant Man) | M. Crooms; D. Holmes; E. Jackson; Pjarro Scott; Armando Pérez; O'Neil Bryan; George Kranz | Mr. Collipark; Tom Slick | 4:21 |

Sample credits

- "Git It" contains interpolations of "Get It Girl" and "Throw That D", written by Luther Campbell, David Hobbs, Mark Ross, and Christopher Wong Won.
- "The Pink" contains elements of "The Pink Panther Theme", written by Henry Mancini.
- "Bedroom Boom" contains elements of "I Will Always Be There for You", written by Michael Sterling.
- "Shake (Remix)" contains a sample of "Din Daa Daa", written and performed by George Kranz.

=== DVD ===
1. "Wait (The Whisper Song)"
2. "Badd" (featuring Mike Jones)
3. "Shake" (featuring Pitbull)
4. 90 min. of behind the scenes footage, live performances, and interviews

== Charts ==
=== Weekly charts ===
| Chart (2006) | Peak position |
|---|---|
| US Billboard 200 | 45 |
| US Top R&B/Hip-Hop Albums (Billboard) | 16 |

=== Year-end charts ===
| Chart (2006) | Position |
|---|---|
| US Top R&B/Hip-Hop Albums (Billboard) | 94 |
