= Flawless (V.I.C. song) =

Single by V.I.C.

from the album Beast
- Released: November 4, 2008
- Recorded: 2008
- Genre: Pop rap
- Length: 3:28
- Label: Warner Bros.
- Songwriter(s): Victor Ganz
- Producer(s): Mr.Collipark

V.I.C. singles chronology
"Wobble" (2008)	"Flawless" (2008)	"We Ridin'" (2008)

"Flawless" is the third single of rapper V.I.C. from his debut album Beast. The single is produced by Mr. Collipark. The song hit radio on November 4, 2008.

== Chart positions ==
Chart (2008)	Peak position
U.S. Billboard Bubbling Under Hot 100 Singles	2
U.S. Billboard Hot Rap Tracks	43
