= U.S.A. (United State of Atlanta) =

Studio album by Ying Yang Twins
- Released: June 28, 2005
- Recorded: 2004–2005
- Studio: ColliPark Studio (Atlanta, Georgia); The Zone Studios (Norcross, Georgia); Hoodstyle Recording Studio; The Bat Cave; Studio A Recording, Inc. (Dearborn Heights, Michigan); Studio 7303 (Houston, Texas); D-Roc's Crib (Atlanta); The Chopper City Studios (New Orleans, Louisiana); Darkside Entertainment (Miami, Florida); The SwishaHouse (Houston, Texas); Larrabee North Recording Studios (North Hollywood, California); Stankonia Recording (Atlanta); The Cutting Room Studios (New York City); PatchWerk Recording Studios (Atlanta); Casa Grande (Miami); The Record Plant (Hollywood, California)
- Genre: Southern hip hop; crunk
- Length: 76:47
- Label: TVT
- Producer: Homebwoi; Kaine; Lil' Jon; Midnight Black; Mr. Collipark; The Pentagon

Ying Yang Twins chronology
My Brother & Me (2004)	U.S.A. (United State of Atlanta) (2005)	Chemically Imbalanced (2006)

Singles from U.S.A. (United State of Atlanta)
- 1. "Wait (The Whisper Song)" Released: March 1, 2005; 2. "Badd" Released: July 26, 2005; 3. "Shake" Released: August 23, 2005; 4. "Bedroom Boom" Released: 2005

U.S.A. (United State of Atlanta) (stylized on the cover as U.nited S.tate of A.tlanta) is the fourth studio album by the American hip hop duo Ying Yang Twins. It was released on June 28, 2005 via ColliPark Music and TVT Records. A chopped and screwed version done by Michael "5000" Watts was released later the same year.

The recording sessions took place at ColliPark Studio, D-Roc's Crib, Stankonia Recording and PatchWerk Recording Studios in Atlanta, The Zone Studios in Norcross, Studio A Recording, Inc. in Dearborn Heights, Studio 7303 and The SwishaHouse in Houston, The Chopper City Studios in New Orleans, Darkside Entertainment and Casa Grande in Miami, Larrabee North Recording Studios in North Hollywood, The Cutting Room Studios in New York, The Record Plant in Hollywood, Hoodstyle Recording Studio and The Bat Cave.

Production was handled by Mr. Collipark, who produced the majority of the album, Midnight Black, Homebwoi, Lil' Jon, The Pentagon and member Kaine. It features guest appearances from Adam Levine, Anthony Hamilton, Anwar, Avant, B.G., Bun B, Countrie Biggz, Da Muzicianz, Homebwoi, Jacki-O, Mike Jones, Pitbull, Teedra Moses, Busta Rhymes, Free Marie, Lil' Scrappy, Missy Elliott and Mr. ColliPark.

In the United States, the album debuted at number #2 on the Billboard 200 and atop the Top R&B/Hip-Hop Albums, with approximately 201,000 copies sold in the first week released, marking the duo's highest-charting album to date. The album was certified platinum by the Recording Industry Association of America on August 25, 2005 with an excess of one million copies sold.

The album was supported with singles: "Wait (The Whisper Song)", "Badd", "Shake" and "Bedroom Boom". Mr. Collipark's remix of Britney Spears' "(I Got That) Boom Boom" was initially going to appear on the album but did not make the final cut.

== Critical reception ==
Professional ratings
Aggregate scores
Source	Rating
Metacritic	76/100
Review scores
Source	Rating
AllMusic	3.5/5 stars
Entertainment Weekly	A−
HipHopDX	2.5/5
IGN	7/10
Los Angeles Times	3/4 stars
Pitchfork	7.5/10
PopMatters	7/10
RapReviews	6/10
Rolling Stone	3.5/5 stars
Spin	B

Professional ratings
for U.nited S.tate of A.tlanta (Chopped & Screwed)
Review scores
Source	Rating
IGN	7/10
PopMatters	4/10
Stylus	B

U.nited S.tate of A.tlanta was met with generally favourable reviews from music critics. At Metacritic, which assigns a normalized rating out of 100 to reviews from mainstream publications, the album received an average score of 76 based on fifteen reviews.

Nick Marino of Entertainment Weekly gave the album "A−" rating, saying it "prove[s] they have something in common with Common: they can be conscious without being soft". Soren Baker of Los Angeles Times called it Ying Yang Twins' "most ambitious album". Tom Breihan of Pitchfork found it "a good-not-great Southern rap album, overlong and weighted down by too many inept slow tracks but boasting enough furious, kinetic dance tracks to make it worth your money". Spin gave the album "B" rating, calling it "a deliriously twerked, end-of-days house party".

AllMusic's David Jeffries wrote: "at 77 minutes and 23 tracks, the sprawling album is weighed down by some filler and redundant numbers, but as a step forward for a party band riding on whatever the Dirty South sound of the moment is, it's surprisingly bold and accomplished". Lee Henderson of PopMatters called it "Black Eyed Peas with swear words". Christian Hoard of Rolling Stone resumed: "at seventy-seven minutes, their new disc is long on crunked-out filler, but there are plenty of hook-filled bangers and club-ready sex rhymes".

RapReviews contributor gave the album mixed review, stating "it's no secret the Twins get gully. Fortunately for listeners, it's very contagious. Unfortunately, it comes at the expense of lyrical content".

== Track listing ==
No.	Title	Writer(s)	Producer(s)	Length
1.	"All Good Things (Intro)"	Eric Jackson	Kaine	1:29
2.	"Fuck the Ying Yang Twins"	Jackson; D'eongelo Holmes; Michael Crooms	Mr. Collipark	4:56
3.	"Long Time" (featuring Anthony Hamilton)	Jackson; Tracey Sewell; Reuben Fairfax; Al Green; Fred Jordan	Midnight Black	5:16
4.	"Live Again" (featuring Adam Levine)	Jackson; D. Holmes; Crooms; Jacob Joseph Arnold; John Michael Hurby; William Whedbee	Mr. Collipark; The Pentagon	4:15
5.	"We at War" (Skit)		Homebwoi	0:59
6.	"Ghetto Classics"	Jackson; D. Holmes; Crooms; Anne Dudley; Trevor Horn; J. J. Jeczalik; Gary Langan; Paul Morley	Mr. Collipark	3:58
7.	"The Courthouse" (Skit)		Homebwoi	0:28
8.	"23 Hr. Lock Down" (featuring Bun B)	Jackson; D. Holmes; Bernard Freeman; Crooms	Mr. Collipark	4:37
9.	"Sex Therapy 101" (Skit)			1:12
10.	"Wait (The Whisper Song)"	Jackson; D. Holmes; Crooms	Mr. Collipark	2:59
11.	"Sex Therapy 102" (Skit)			1:01
12.	"Pull My Hair"	Jackson; D. Holmes; Crooms	Mr. Collipark	4:12
13.	"Sex Therapy 103" (Skit)			0:58
14.	"Bedroom Boom" (featuring Avant)	Jackson; D. Holmes; Myron Avant; Crooms; Michael Sterling	Mr. Collipark	4:37
15.	"The Walk" (featuring Da Muzicianz, Countrie Biggz, Homebwoi and B.G.)	D. Holmes; Brandon Sams; Courtney Holmes; Yumtobby Threatt; James Wesley Maddox; Christopher Dorsey; Crooms	Mr. Collipark	4:21
16.	"Hoes" (featuring Jacki-O)	Jackson; D. Holmes; Angela Kohn; Crooms; Jeffrey Thompkins	Mr. Collipark	4:23
17.	"Badd" (featuring Mike Jones and Mr. Collipark)	Jackson; D. Holmes; Michael Jones; Crooms	Mr. Collipark	3:45
18.	"Put That Thang Down" (featuring Teedra Moses)	Jackson; D. Holmes; Teedra Moses; Jonathan Smith; Craig Love; LaMarquis Jefferson; Tony Butler	Lil' Jon	3:30
19.	"Shake" (featuring Pitbull)	Jackson; D. Holmes; Armando Pérez; Crooms; Pjarro Scott; George Kranz	Mr. Collipark	4:01
20.	"My Brother's Keeper" (featuring Anwar)	Jackson; D. Holmes; Sewell	Midnight Black	5:24
21.	"Dedication & Upcoming Events" (Skit)		Mr. Collipark	2:19
22.	"U.S.A."	Jackson; D. Holmes; Crooms	Mr. Collipark	3:32
23.	"Wait (The Whisper Song) (Remix)" (featuring Busta Rhymes, Missy Elliott, Lil' Scrappy, Free Marie and Mr. ColliPark)	Jackson; D. Holmes; Trevor Smith; Melissa Elliott; Darryl Richardson; Marie Wright; Crooms	Mr. Collipark	4:35
Total length:				76:47

Sample credits

- Track 3 contains an interpolation of "Belle", written by Reuben Fairfax, Al Green, and Fred Jordan.
- Track 6 contains a sample of "Beat Box", written by Anne Dudley, Trevor Horn, J. J. Jeczalik, Gary Langan, and Paul Morley, and performed by Art of Noise.
- Track 14 contains an interpolation of "I Will Always Be There For You", written by Michael Sterling.
- Track 16 contains an interpolation of "I Hate Hoes", written by Jeffrey Thompkins.
- Track 18 contains a sample of "When I Hear Music", written by Tony Butler, and performed by Debbie Deb.
- Track 19 contains a sample of "Din Daa Daa", written and performed by George Kranz.

Leftover track

- "(I Got That) Boom Boom (Mr. Collipark Remix)" (with Britney Spears)

== Charts ==
=== Weekly charts ===
Chart (2005–2006)	Peak position
German Albums (Offizielle Top 100)	94
UK R&B Albums (Official Charts)	37
UK Independent Albums (Official Charts)	50
US Billboard 200	2
US Top R&B/Hip-Hop Albums (Billboard)	1

=== Year-end charts ===
Chart (2005)	Position
US Billboard 200	75
US Top R&B/Hip-Hop Albums (Billboard)	29

== Certifications ==
Region	Certification	Certified units/sales
United States (RIAA)	Platinum	1,000,000^{^}
^{^} Shipments figures based on certification alone.

== See also ==
- List of Billboard number-one R&B/hip-hop albums of 2005
