= Git It =

Single by Bun B featuring Ying Yang Twins

from the album Trill / U.S.A. Still United
- Released: January 24, 2006
- Recorded: 2005
- Genre: Crunk; hip hop; Southern hip hop
- Length: 3:57
- Label: Rap-A-Lot; Asylum; Atlantic
- Songwriters: Bernard Freeman; De'Angelo Holmes; Eric Jackson; Michael Crooms; Luther Campbell; David Hobbs; Mark Ross; Christopher Wong Won
- Producer: Mr. Collipark

Bun B singles chronology
"Check on It" (2005)	"Git It" (2006)	"My 64" (2008)

Ying Yang Twins singles chronology
"Ms. New Booty" (2005)	"Git It" (2006)	"Dangerous" (2006)

"Git It" is the second single from Bun B's debut album Trill. It features the Ying Yang Twins and is produced by Mr. Collipark. It peaked at number 22 on the U.S. rap chart. This song is also a remake of the song "Get It Girl" which was done by the Miami-based rap duo 2 Live Crew and released in 1986 from their album The 2 Live Crew Is What We Are.

It is also credited as The Ying Yang Twins featuring Bun B.

== Charts ==
Chart (2006)	Peak position
Australia (ARIA) Double A-side with "Shake"	85
US Bubbling Under Hot 100 (Billboard)	1
US Hot Rap Songs (Billboard)	22
US Rhythmic (Billboard)	17
