= Turn Around (5, 4, 3, 2, 1) =

2010 single by Flo Rida

Single by Flo Rida featuring DJ Frank E

from the album Only One Flo (Part 1)
- Released: November 8, 2010
- Recorded: Paramount Studios (Los Angeles, California)
- Genre: Hip hop
- Length: 3:21
- Label: Atlantic, Poe Boy
- Songwriters: Tramar Dillard, Justin Franks, Priscilla Polete, Xplicit, Olle Cornéer, Stefan Engblom, George Kranz, Boris Blank, Dieter Meier
- Producers: DJ Frank E, Dada Life

Flo Rida singles chronology
"Higher" (2010)	"Turn Around (5, 4, 3, 2, 1)" (2010)	"Who Dat Girl" (2011)

"Turn Around (5, 4, 3, 2, 1)" is a song by American rapper Flo Rida from his third studio album, Only One Flo (Part 1), which features American producer DJ Frank E. It was released as the second single on 8 November 2010 in the United States. The song contains samples of "Din Daa Daa" by German dance singer George Kranz, and "Oh Yeah" by Swiss electronica band Yello. It debuted at number 98 on the Billboard Hot 100 and was featured prominently in the closing credits of The Hangover Part II. It was the second such use of a Flo Rida song in the closing credits of a film from "The Hangover" franchise—the first was "Right Round", which also featured DJ Frank E and was used in the closing credits of The Hangover.

== Critical reception ==
Robert Copsey of Digital Spy gave the song 3 stars out of 5 and stated "this follow-up [to "Club Can't Handle Me"] isn't quite as instant, nor is it as lyrically ear-snagging, but it's nice to see him having another crack at this singing malarkey [...] What's more, the electro-trance backdrop is so last summer, but it was worth bringing back for those "Mmm Da-Da"s alone".

=== Sequel ===
A sequel to "Turn Around (5, 4, 3, 2, 1)" called "Turn Around, Pt. 2" with Pitbull's vocals, was released on iTunes on May 17, 2011. It was used in the end credits of The Hangover Part II.

== Music video ==
=== Controversy ===
In the United Kingdom, broadcasting regulator Ofcom received three viewer complaints after the video was broadcast on British music channel 4Music at approximately 1400 and 1800 UTC during December 2010 - January 2011, long before the 2100 watershed, "at the time when children are most likely to watch TV". The complainants claimed the video consisted of "extreme crudeness and filth" in a "sexist and offensive video which mostly comprises women in thong bikini bottoms acting in a pornographic manner". One complainant "was shocked to see women in thongs and bras gyrating and basically dry humping men in this video". In the opinion of one viewer, "this objectification of women at such an early time and on a channel that appeals to young people really concerns me".

At approximately the same time, rival music video channels MTV Base and MTV Dance generated three further viewer complaints for broadcasting the same video at 1750, 1900 and 1450 respectively. Expressing concern about younger viewers, the video was "effectively soft porn" and was given "far too early" a broadcast time, according to the MTV Base complainaints. The MTV Base complainaint claimed the "rude" and "filthy" video was "too explicit for daytime TV" and that "ladies shaking their rear-end provocatively should not be promoted by MTV".

Box Television, the company owning 4Music, apologised for any offence viewers may have experienced but claimed that the video did comply with Ofcom regulations as, in the video, "female dancers [wear] thong bikinis and Carnival attire, synonymous with Brazilian Carnival, there is no nudity, inappropriate touching of the dancers or explicit sexual display". The company also stated that they had "placed a scheduling restriction so that it would not play in the pre-school (0700 – 1000) Breakfast Fix."

MTV Base responded to the allegations by claiming that the females featured in the video were "portrayed as Copacabana girls, happy to dance, to be confident in their bodies and to celebrate the Brazilian party lifestyle" as opposed to "an expression of sex". The channel noted that "dancers are at all times clothed and although the clothing may be scant – it is not inappropriate dress for beach attire or carnival". MTV Dance replied in a similar manner, adding: "MTV Dance is a niche channel and its main audience being 16 – 34 year olds".

In both cases, Ofcom concluded that the music video was in breach of Rule 1.3 of their Broadcasting Code, which says: "Children must also be protected by appropriate scheduling from material that is unsuitable for them."

== Track listing ==
- Digital download
1. "Turn Around (5, 4, 3, 2, 1)" – 3:21
- German digital download
1. "Turn Around (5, 4, 3, 2, 1)" – 3:21
2. "Turn Around (5, 4, 3, 2, 1)" (Instrumental) – 3:18
3. "Turn Around (5, 4, 3, 2, 1)" (Acapella) – 3:18
- German CD single
1. "Turn Around (5, 4, 3, 2, 1)"
2. "Turn Around (5, 4, 3, 2, 1)" (DJ Bam Bam Radio Remix)

== Personnel ==
- Songwriting – Tramar Dillard, Justin Franks, Xplicit, Priscilla Polete, Olle Cornéer, Stefan Engblom, George Kranz, Boris Blank, Dieter Meier
- Production – DJ Frank E, Dada Life
- Recording and vocal production – JP "The Specialist" Negrete
- Additional recording – John Armstrong
- Additional vocals – Prissy Polete
- Mixing – Manny Marroquin
- Mixing assistant – Christian Plata, Erik Madrid
- Mastering – Chris Gehringer

== Charts and certifications ==
=== Weekly charts ===
Chart (2010–2011)	Peak position
Australia (ARIA)	12
Austria (Ö3 Austria Top 40)	7
Belgium (Ultratip Bubbling Under Flanders)	7
Belgium (Ultratip Bubbling Under Wallonia)	2
Canada Hot 100 (Billboard)	46
Czech Republic Airplay (ČNS IFPI)	26
Denmark (Tracklisten)	38
Finland (Suomen virallinen lista)	16
Germany (GfK)	8
Ireland (IRMA)	36
Israel International Airplay (Media Forest)	9
Luxembourg Digital Songs (Billboard)	1
New Zealand (Recorded Music NZ)	33
Romania (UPFR)	40
Spain (Promusicae)	36
Spain (Airplay Chart)	18
Slovakia Airplay (ČNS IFPI)	69
Sweden (Sverigetopplistan)	54
Switzerland (Schweizer Hitparade)	21
UK Hip Hop/R&B (OCC)	12
UK Singles (OCC)	41
US Billboard Hot 100	98

=== Year-end charts ===
Chart (2011)	Position
Australia (ARIA)	66
Austria (Ö3 Austria Top 40)	64
Germany (Official German Charts)	55

=== Certifications ===
Region	Certification	Certified units/sales
Australia (ARIA)	2× Platinum	140,000^{^}
Austria (IFPI Austria)	Gold	15,000^{*}
Germany (BVMI)	Gold	150,000^{^}
^{*} Sales figures based on certification alone.^{^} Shipments figures based on certification alone.
