= Say I Yi Yi =

2002 single by Ying Yang Twins

Single by Ying Yang Twins

from the album Alley: The Return of the Ying Yang Twins
- Released: February 22, 2002
- Recorded: 2001
- Genre: Bounce; crunk; southern hip hop; dirty rap
- Length: 4:32
- Label: Koch
- Songwriter(s): Deongelo Holmes, Eric Jackson, Michael Crooms
- Producer(s): Mr. Collipark

Ying Yang Twins singles chronology
"Ying Yang in This Thang" (2000)	"Say I Yi Yi" (2002)	"By Myself" (2002)

"Say I Yi Yi" is a song by American hip hop duo Ying Yang Twins. It is the lead single from their second studio album Alley: The Return of the Ying Yang Twins (2002). The song has been described as an "infectious booty-blessing anthem".

According to the Ying Yang Twins, the song was previously denied by Universal Records, and its release led to them receiving a phone call from Jay-Z, who told them they were "fuckin' up my money". The song became one of their more successful hits following their 2000 single "Whistle While You Twurk", selling 465,000 units in 2002.

== Charts ==
=== Weekly charts ===
Chart (2002)	Peak position
US Billboard Hot 100	56
US Hot R&B/Hip-Hop Songs (Billboard)	22
US Hot Rap Songs (Billboard)	10
US Rhythmic (Billboard)	24

=== Year-end charts ===
Chart (2002)	Position
US Hot R&B/Hip-Hop Songs (Billboard)	82

== Certifications ==
Region	Certification	Certified units/sales
United States (RIAA)	Gold	500,000^{‡}
^{‡} Sales+streaming figures based on certification alone.
