= Only One Flo (Part 1) =

Studio album by Flo Rida
- Released: November 30, 2010
- Recorded: 2009–2010; Groove Motel (Stockholm, Sweden); Paramount Studios (Los Angeles, California); Conway Recording Studios (Los Angeles, California); Dr. Luke's (Los Angeles, California) eyeknowasecret Studios (Brentwood, California)
- Genre: Pop-rap; hip house; dance
- Length: 27:11
- Label: Poe Boy; Atlantic
- Producer: Axwell; DJ Frank E; Dada Life; Infinity; Antario "Tario" Holmes; Dr. Luke; Benny Blanco; Boi-1da; J.U.S.T.I.C.E. League; Los Da Mystro; Polow da Don; David Guetta; Frédéric Riesterer; Knobody; Slade; Wayne-O; Mike Caren

Flo Rida chronology
| R.O.O.T.S. (2009) | Only One Flo (Part 1) (2010) | Good Feeling (2012) |

Flo Rida studio album chronology
| R.O.O.T.S. (2009) | Only One Flo (Part 1) (2010) | Wild Ones (2012) |

Singles from Only One Flo (Part 1)
- 1. "Club Can't Handle Me" Released: June 28, 2010; 2. "Turn Around (5, 4, 3, 2, 1)" Released: November 8, 2010; 3. "Who Dat Girl" Released: January 11, 2011; 4. "Why You Up In Here" Released: May 11, 2011

Only One Flo (Part 1) is the third studio album by American rapper Flo Rida, which was released on November 30, 2010, through Atlantic Records and Poe Boy Entertainment. The album was preceded by the singles "Club Can't Handle Me", and "Turn Around (5, 4, 3, 2, 1)" which were released in June and November 2010, respectively.

The album received mixed reviews from critics, and peaked at number 107 on the Billboard 200, selling 11,000 copies in its first week in the US. It is currently his least successful release. It is also considerably short for a studio album, with 8 tracks which total up to less than 30 minutes. A follow-up project titled Only One Rida (Part 2) was set to be released in 2011, but was renamed Wild Ones with a 2012 release.

== Background ==
Only One Flo is the first part of what was originally a two-in-one album, but the next album, Only One Rida (Part 2), was renamed Wild Ones. This album is Flo Rida's first one to be released without the Parental Advisory sticker. The album features guest appearances from Git Fresh, Akon, Laza Morgan, Kevin Rudolf, Ludacris, Gucci Mane, and was originally supposed to also feature guest appearances from Lil Wayne, and Jay Rock. Producers having collaborated with Flo Rida on the album include Axwell, DJ Frank E, Dada Life, Infinity, Antario "tario" Holmes, Dr. Luke, Max Martin, Benny Blanco, Boi-1da, Ester Dean, Los da Mystro, David Guetta, Frédéric Riesterer, Knobody, Slade, Wayne-O, Mike Caren, and David Siegel.

== Singles ==
A promo single, titled "Zoosk Girl", which features T-Pain, was released on the Internet; though the song is not featured on the album, the single does have its own music video. On June 28, 2010, Flo Rida released the song "Club Can't Handle Me" featuring David Guetta, which was stated to be the official first single for the album. The song was also featured in the Step Up 3D soundtrack. On November 2, 2010, "Come with Me" was released as the first promo single for the album, along with "Puzzle", produced by, and featuring Electrixx, which is not featured on the album. On November 16, 2010, "Turn Around (5, 4, 3, 2, 1)" was released as the second official promo single for the album via the iTunes Store. It debuted on the Australian Singles Chart at number thirty-four on November 29, 2010. After the release of the album in the UK, "Who Dat Girl" featured Akon started to receive a strong number of downloads, thus causing it to debut at number 39 in US and 64 in UK. "Why You Up In Here" was released as the fourth single, and third promo single, on May 11, 2011. The song features Ludacris, Gucci Mane, and Git Fresh.

== Reception ==
=== Commercial performance ===
The album debuted at number 107 on the Billboard 200, with first-week sales of 11,000 copies. The album also charted at number eighty-two in Australia. As of March 25, 2012 the album has sold 61,500 copies in the United States.

=== Critical reception ===
Professional ratings
Aggregate scores
| Source | Rating |
|---|---|
| Metacritic | 55/100 |
Review scores
| Source | Rating |
| AllMusic | 3.5/5 stars |
| Entertainment Weekly | (C) |
| RapReviews | (7/10) |
| Rolling Stone | 2.5/5 stars |
| Slant Magazine | 2/5 stars |
| The Smoking Section | 3/5 stars |

Upon its release, Only One Flo (Part 1) received generally mixed reviews from music critics. At Metacritic, which assigns a normalized rating out of 100 to reviews from mainstream critics, the album received an average score of 55, based on six reviews, which indicates "mixed or average reviews".

David Jeffries of Allmusic gave the album three-and-a-half stars out of five, praising the Nightclub nature of the songs. He particularly complimented the production of "Who Dat Girl" and thought sampling of George Kranz and Yello on "Turn Around (5, 4, 3, 2, 1)". Entertainment Weekly's Mikael Wood gave the album a "C" rating, disappointed that the quality of the songs didn't go beyond that of "Club Can't Handle Me". He also felt that the appearance of guests Ludacris and Gucci Mane on "Why You Up in Here" outshone that of Flo Rida.

== Track listing ==
| No. | Title | Writer(s) | Producer(s) | Length |
|---|---|---|---|---|
| 1. | "On and On" (featuring Kevin Rudolf) | Tramar Dillard; Axwell; Mike Caren; Kevin Rudolf; Jacob Kasher | Axwell | 2:58 |
| 2. | "Turn Around (5, 4, 3, 2, 1)" | Dillard; Justin Franks; Priscilla Polete; Josh Thomas; Xplicit; Olle Cornéer, Stefan Engblom, George Kranz; Boris Blank; Dieter Meier; The Monsters & The Strangerz | DJ Frank E; Dada Life | 3:20 |
| 3. | "Come with Me" | Dillard; Jordan Suecof; John "D.O.E." Maultsby; Carmen Key; Antario Dion Holmes; Rufus Lee Copper; Katari T. Cox; Yafeu A. Fula; Joseph Paquette; Tupac Shakur; Bruce Washington; Tyron J. Wrice | Infinity; Antario "Tario" Holmes | 3:02 |
| 4. | "Who Dat Girl" (featuring Akon) | Dillard; Lukasz Gottwald; Claude Kelly; Benjamin Levin; Bruno Mars; Philip Lawrence | Dr. Luke; Benny Blanco | 3:19 |
| 5. | "21" (featuring Laza Morgan) | Dillard; Matthew Samuels; Julian Bunetta; Jamal Jones; Ester Dean; Tyler Williams; Jordan Lewis | Polow da DonBoi-1da | 3:52 |
| 6. | "Respirator" | Dillard; Carlos McKinney; Tony Scales | Los da Mystro | 3:12 |
| 7. | "Club Can't Handle Me" (featuring David Guetta) | Dillard; David Guetta; Frédéric Riesterer; Caren; Key; Kasia Livingston; Giorgio Tuinfort | David Guetta; Frédéric Riesterer | 3:52 |
| 8. | "Why You Up in Here" (featuring Ludacris, Git Fresh and Gucci Mane) | Dillard; Erik Ortiz; Kevin Crowe; Radric Davis; Chris Bridges | J.U.S.T.I.C.E. League | 3:36 |
| Total length: | | | | 27:11 |

iTunes deluxe edition bonus track
| No. | Title | Writer(s) | Producer(s) | Length |
|---|---|---|---|---|
| 9. | "Momma" | Dillard; Mike Caren; David Siegel | Mike Caren | 2:53 |

== Personnel ==
- Flo Rida – composer, executive producer, vocals
- Aaron Bay-Schuck – director
- Akon – vocals
- John Armstrong – engineer
- Axwell – composer, engineer, producer, various
- Nick Bilardello – art direction, design
- Benny Blanco – composer, producer, programming, various
- Boris Blank – composer
- Boi-1da – composer, producer
- Candice Boyd – vocals
- Julian Bunetta – composer
- Mike Caren – composer, director, executive producer, vocal producer
- Rufus Lee Copper – composer
- Olle Corneer – composer
- Katari T. Cox – composer
- Dada Life – producer
- Ester Dean – composer
- Aubry "Big Juice" Delaine – engineer
- Megan Dennis – production coordination
- Dr. Luke – composer, producer, programming, various
- Stefan Engblom – composer
- Jerome Foster – composer
- Sandrine Fouilhoux – stylist
- Frank E. – producer
- Justin Franks – composer
- Yafeu Fula – composer
- Chris Gehringer – mastering
- Sydne George – composer
- Şerban Ghenea – mixing
- Rob Gold – art manager
- Tatiana Gottwald – assistant
- Gucci Mane – composer
- David Guetta – composer, producer
- John Hanes – engineer
- Dionnee Harper – direction, marketing
- Sam Holland – engineer
- Antario Dion Holmes – composer, keyboards, producer
- Infinity – producer
- Jacob Kasher – composer
- Claude Kelly – composer, background vocals
- Carmen Key – composer
- Knobody – producer
- George Kranz – composer
- Philip Lawrence – composer
- Jordan Lewis – composer
- Kasia Levingston – composer
- Los da Mystro – composer, producer
- Ludacris – composer
- Erik Madrid – assistant, engineer
- Fabian Marasciullo – mixing
- Manny Marroquin – mixing
- Bruno Mars – composer
- John Maultsby – composer
- Catharine McNelly – publicity
- Dieter Meier – composer
- J. P. "The Specialist" Negrete – engineer, vocal producer
- Chris "Tek" O'Ryan – engineer
- Joseph Paquette – composer
- Christian Plata – assistant
- Priscilla Polete – composer, vocals
- Elvin "Big Chuck" Prince – executive producer
- Eric "E Class" Prince – executive producer
- Lee "Freezy" Prince – executive producer
- Irene Richter – production coordination
- Fred Riesterer – composer, producer
- Tim Roberts – assistant engineer
- Kevin Rudolf – composer
- Tony Scales – composer
- Tupac Shakur – composer
- Pamela Simon – packaging manager
- Marcus Slade – composer, producer
- Jordan Suecof – composer
- Wayne Thomas – composer
- Giorgio Tuinfort – composer, programming
- Is Vantage – engineer
- Bruce Washington – composer
- Wayne-O – producer
- Tyler "T-Minus" Williams – composer
- Zach Wolfe – photography
- Guy Wood – stylist
- Tyrone Wrice – composer
- Emily Wright – engineer
- Xplicit – composer

== Charts ==
Chart performance for Only One Flo (Part 1)
| Chart (2010–2011) | Peak position |
|---|---|
| Australian Albums (ARIA) | 82 |
| Australian Urban Albums (ARIA) | 14 |
| Belgian Heatseekers Albums (Ultratop Flanders) | 20 |
| Canadian Albums (Nielsen SoundScan) | 70 |
| UK Albums (Official Charts) | 179 |
| UK R&B Albums (Official Charts) | 26 |
| US Billboard 200 | 107 |
| US Top R&B/Hip-Hop Albums (Billboard) | 21 |
| US Top Rap Albums (Billboard) | 11 |

== Certifications ==
Certifications for Only One Flo (Part 1)
| Region | Certification | Certified units/sales |
|---|---|---|
| New Zealand (RMNZ) | Platinum | 15,000^{‡} |
^{‡} Sales+streaming figures based on certification alone.
