= Let's Get Physical =

Studio album by Elephant Man
- Released: April 8, 2008
- Genre: Dancehall, hip hop
- Label: VP; Bad Boy; Atlantic
- Producer: Diddy; Chris Chin; Harve Pierre; Willie Daniels; Rupert "Q 45" Blake; J. R. Rotem; Swizz Beatz

Elephant Man chronology
Good 2 Go (2003)	Let's Get Physical (2008)

Singles from Let's Get Physical
- 1. "Five-O" Released: April 24, 2007; 2. "Feel the Steam" Released: April 14, 2008

Professional ratings
Review scores
Source	Rating
Allmusic	4/5 stars
DJBooth.net	3.5/5 stars

Let's Get Physical is the sixth studio album by Jamaican musician Elephant Man released on Bad Boy in 2008.

The first single from the album, "Five-O" features Wyclef Jean.

The song "Willie Bounce" appeared on several mixtapes in early 2006. Elephant Man borrowed the first few bars from "I Will Survive" by Gloria Gaynor.

The second single "Jump" was released on November 6 and it features and was produced by Swizz Beatz.

== U.S track listing ==
#	Title	Producer(s)	Featured guest(s)	Time
1	"Drop Dead"	Stephen "Di Genius" McGregor		3:04
2	"Dem Nah Ready"	Mark Pinnock		3:41
3	"Feel the Steam"	Willie Daniels & Andrew "Goldenchyl" Fennell	Chris Brown	3:40
4	"Throw Your Hands Up"	Richard "Richie D" Martin & Willie Daniels	Rihanna	3:19
5	"Five-O"	Wyclef Jean	Wyclef Jean & Diddy	4:39
6	"Jump"	Swizz Beatz		3:08
7	"Back That Thing on Me (Shake That)"	Mario Winans	Mario Winans	3:12
8	"Our World"	Trevor "Baby G" James	Demarco	3:10
9	"The Way We Roll (Remix)"	Willie Daniels	Busta Rhymes & Shaggy	4:11
10	"Sweep the Floor"	Stephen "Di Genius" McGregor		3:19
11	"Body Talk"	J. R. Rotem	Kat DeLuna & Jha Jha	4:04
12	"Who Wanna"	Swizz Beatz	Swizz Beatz	3:09
13	"Five-O (Remix)"	Wyclef Jean, Swizz Beatz	Wyclef Jean, Swizz Beatz, Assassin, Yung Joc, & Diddy	4:05
14	"Gully Creepa"	Sean 'Seannizzle' Reid		3:26

== Japanese track listing ==
#	Title	Producer(s)	Featured guest(s)	Time
1	"Ready Fi Di Video"	Mark Pinnock		3:45
2	"Drop Dead"	Stephen McGregor		3:07
3	"The Way We Roll" (Remix)	Cipha Sounds & Solitair	Busta Rhymes & Shaggy	4:20
4	"Willie Bounce"	Rupert "Q45" Blake		4:10
5	"Throw Your Hands Up"	Richard "Richie D" Martin & Willie Daniels	Rihanna	3:22
6	"Five-O"	Willie Daniels	Wyclef Jean & Diddy	4:38
7	"Gangster World"	Troyton Rami	Rehka	3:01
8	"Shake That Ass Is On Fire"	Rohan "Jah SnowCone" Fuller		3:38
9	"That La La"	Richard "Richie D" Martin	Mýa	2:48
10	"Like A Snake"	Richard "Richie D" Martin & Willie Daniels	Don Omar	3:22
11	"Wave Ya Rag"	Lil Jon		3:42
12	"Real Pimps"	Troyton Rami		3:20
13	"Five-O" (Remix)	Willie Daniels	Wyclef Jean, Swizz Beatz, Assassin, & Yung Joc	4:07

- In the track "Like a Snake", Elephant Man reuses the lyrics from the song "Shake (Remix)" with the Ying Yang Twins and Pitbull.
