= Five-O (song) =

Single by Elephant Man featuring Wyclef Jean

from the album Let's Get Physical
- Released: April 24, 2007
- Genre: Reggae fusion (dancehall/rap)
- Length: 3:56
- Label: Bad Boy; VP
- Songwriter(s): O'Neil Bryan, Jerry Duplessis, Andre Fennell, Wyclef Jean
- Producer(s): Willie Daniels

Elephant Man singles chronology
"Jook Gal" (2004)	"Five-O" (2007)	"Whine Up" (2007)

Wyclef Jean singles chronology
"Dangerous" (2007)	"Five-O" (2007)	"You Know What It Is" (2007)

"Five-O" is the first single by Elephant Man from his album Let's Get Physical. In addition, it's also his debut single released with Bad Boy Records. It features Wyclef Jean and has a small vocal in the intro by Diddy.

The official remix features Wyclef Jean, Swizz Beatz, Assassin, and Yung Joc. In the remix Swizz adds some of his production.

This song is featured on DANCE! Online, a multiplayer online casual rhythm game.

== Music video ==
The music video is directed by Gil Green and recorded in Little Haiti, Miami. The video uses a theme similar to "COPS" but it's named "Five-O". Two police officers suspect an illegal activity by two suspects, which they target Elephant Man and Wyclef. At first, they're being followed and pulled over. The policemen conduct a search on the vehicle and find a "possible concealed weapon" and try to arrest the suspects. However, they resist arrest and attempt to escape the policemen. The video shows a cameo of Reggaeton artist Tego Calderón.

== Charts ==
Chart (2007)	Peak position
U.S. Billboard Hot R&B/Hip-Hop Songs	87
