= Taurus (group) =

American hip hop group

- Origin: Atlanta, Georgia, U.S.
- Genres: Contemporary R&B, Crunk&B, Hip hop
- Years active: 2005–2007
- Label: Landmine Entertainment Inc.
- Members: Domanica "Doma" Raye; Bianca "Notation" Raye; Jemekia "Jazz" Roberts

Taurus was an American female Crunk&B trio, consisting of Doma, Notation & Jazz, that became slightly known for their heavily Salt-N-Pepa-influenced debut single "Taurus Here" in 2005. In January 2006, the trio made their first public television appearances on the now-defunct musical series, Showtime at the Apollo and Soul Train, to perform their single, "Taurus Here".

In 2007, the group was requested by the New Jersey Nets to sing the national anthem. That same year, the group released another single titled, "Get Out My Bed", which featured production by Mr. Collipark and guest rap verses from rapper, Hurricane Chris. By the year's end, Taurus had departed from their label, Landmine Entertainment, and their self-titled debut album was shelved.

== Singles ==
Year	Title	Chart positions		Album
Year	Title	US Pop 100	US R&B/Hip-Hop	Album
2005	"Taurus Here"	100	16	Taurus
2006	"If I Was Ya Girl" (Note: Promo single released under ColliPark Records and Landmine Entertainment Inc., produced by Mr. Collipark and Bruce Wayne [sic])	–	–	Taurus
2007	"Get Out My Bed" (featuring Hurricane Chris)	–	–	Taurus

== Guest appearances ==
Year	Title	Album
2006	"Jack It Up" with Ying Yang Twins	Chemically Imbalanced
