= Salt shaker (disambiguation) =

A salt shaker is a container for salt. Salt shaker or saltshaker may also refer to:

- "Salt Shaker" (song), 2003 single by Ying Yang Twins
- The Saltshaker Project, an initiative of Greening Australia
