= Chemically Imbalanced =

Chemically Imbalanced may refer to:

- Chemical imbalance
- Chemically Imbalanced (Ying Yang Twins album), 2006
- Chemically Imbalanced (Chris Webby album), 2014
