= Taurus Here =

Single by Taurus

from the album Taurus
- Released: 2005
- Recorded: Claymore Studios (College Park, Georgia)
- Genre: Crunk&B, hip hop
- Length: 4:18 (album version)
- Label: Landmine Entertainment Inc.
- Songwriters: D. Smitty, D. Raye, H. Azor, R. Davis
- Producer: D. Smitty

Taurus singles chronology
"Taurus Here" (2005)	"Get Out My Bed" (2007)

"Taurus Here" is the debut single by Atlanta-based Crunk&B–girl group Taurus. It was written by producer D. Smitty alongside Taurus member Domanica "Doma" Raye, and served as the lead single for Taurus's unreleased self-titled debut album. The song is also noted for its heavy sampling of Salt-n-Pepa's 1987 hit single, "Push It", which served as a tribute to the rap group.

In the week of July 2, 2005, the song debuted on Billboard's Hot R&B/Hip-Hop Songs chart as a Hot Shot at number 70. In its third week, the song leaped to its peak position of 16, where it was named the third song to garner greatest airplay (behind Tony Yayo's "So Seductive" and Mariah Carey's "We Belong Together"). By November 2005, the song fell off the chart, spending a total of 18 weeks.

== Music video ==
=== Background ===
The video was filmed on June 28, 2005, and saw a limited release in August 2005. It was directed by Lisa Cunningham and Adam Bush, choreographed by EGYPT and featured a cameo appearance by Cristal "Serious" Steverson from Vh1's former programming Flavor of Love.

=== Synopsis ===
The video begins with the girls entering The Atlanta Institute of Performing Arts, where they decide to audition in front of a judging panel in the style of American Idol. The group then begins to dance with various students from the Institute along with one of the judges. The video then cuts to the girls waiting outside, being informed that their song is being played on the radio; a scene transitions to the whole Institute body dancing to their song outside campus and ends with the group posing for pictures in promotion of a private concert.

== Charts ==
Chart (2005)	Peak position
US Billboard Hot R&B/Hip-Hop Singles & Tracks	16
US Billboard Pop 100	100
US Billboard Hot R&B/Hip-Hop Singles Sales	1
US Billboard Hot Singles Sales	4
