= Alley: The Return of the Ying Yang Twins =

Studio album by Ying Yang Twins
- Released: March 26, 2002
- Recorded: 2001–02
- Studios: Treasure House Studio (Montgomery, Alabama); ColliPark Studios; The Zone Studio
- Genres: Hip hop; southern hip hop; crunk
- Length: 62:51
- Labels: Koch, ColliPark Records
- Producer: Mr. Collipark

Ying Yang Twins chronology
Thug Walkin' (2000)	Alley: The Return of the Ying Yang Twins (2002)	Me & My Brother (2003)

Singles from Alley: The Return of the Ying Yang Twins
- 1. "Say I Yi Yi" Released: February 22, 2002; 2. "By Myself" Released: 2002

Professional ratings
Review scores
Source	Rating
AllMusic	1.5/5 stars

Alley: The Return of the Ying Yang Twins is the second studio album by American hip hop duo Ying Yang Twins. It was released on March 26, 2002, through Koch Records. The album debuted at number 79 on the Billboard 200 and peaked at number 58 two weeks later. The album also sold over 400,000 copies in the US.

== Track listing ==
No.	Title	Length
1.	"Playahatian"	1:55
2.	"I'm Tired"	4:30
3.	"Alley" (featuring Mr. Ball)	5:49
4.	"Say I Yi Yi"	4:32
5.	"Sound Off"	4:25
6.	"Huff Puff"	4:22
7.	"By Myself" (featuring Mr. Ball)	4:45
8.	"Drop Like This 2001" (featuring Dirty)	5:33
9.	"ATL Eternally" (featuring Pastor Troy and Lil Jon & the Eastside Boyz)	4:18
10.	"Hunchin'"	4:31
11.	"Tongue Bath" (featuring Methrone)	4:44
12.	"Twurkulator"	4:12
13.	"Credits"	1:58
14.	"Crank It Up" (bonus track)	3:43
15.	"Say I Yi Yi" (remix version; bonus track)	3:34
Total length:		62:51

== Charts ==
=== Weekly charts ===
Chart (2002)	Peak position
US Billboard 200	58
US Top R&B/Hip-Hop Albums (Billboard)	8
US Independent Albums (Billboard)	2

=== Year-end charts ===
Chart (2002)	Position
US Top R&B/Hip-Hop Albums (Billboard)	55
