= What's Happenin! =

Single by Ying Yang Twins featuring Trick Daddy

Single by Ying Yang Twins featuring Trick Daddy

from the album Me & My Brother
- Released: August 15, 2004
- Genre: Crunk
- Length: 4:19
- Label: TVT
- Songwriters: Eric Jackson, Deongelo Holmes, Maurice Young, Michael Crooms
- Producer: Mr. Collipark

Ying Yang Twins singles chronology
"Salt Shaker" (2003)	"What's Happenin!" (2004)	"Halftime (Stand Up & Get Crunk!)" (2004)

Trick Daddy singles chronology
"Round Here" (2003)	"What's Happenin!" (2004)	"Let's Go" (2004)

Music video
- "What's Happenin!" on YouTube

"What's Happenin!" (also titled as "What's Happnin!") is a song by American hip hop group Ying Yang Twins. It is the third single from their third studio album Me & My Brother (2003) and features American rapper Trick Daddy. The song was produced by Mr. Collipark.

== Critical reception ==
Writing for RapReviews, Damon Brown cited the song as one of the tracks from Me & My Brother in which the "guest stars fall in line right into Ying Yang's way of doing things, as opposed to bringing something fresh to the mix", which he described as interesting and somewhat disappointing. Gil Kaufman of Rolling Stone mentioned the song as an example of a track with "shouted, crack-pipe catchy hooks" and verses that "feel like poorly executed foreplay".

== Charts ==
Chart (2003–04)	Peak position
US Billboard Hot 100	30
US Hot R&B/Hip-Hop Songs (Billboard)	24
US Hot Rap Songs (Billboard)	9
US Rhythmic Airplay (Billboard)	7
