= Naggin' =

2003 single by Ying Yang Twins

Single by Ying Yang Twins

from the album Me & My Brother
- Released: June 17, 2003
- Genre: Crunk
- Length: 4:23
- Label: TVT
- Songwriter(s): Eric Jackson, Deongelo Holmes, Michael Crooms
- Producer(s): Mr. Collipark

Ying Yang Twins singles chronology
"Get Low" (2003)	"Naggin'" (2003)	"Salt Shaker" (2003)

Music video
- "Naggin'" on YouTube

"Naggin'" is a song by American hip hop group Ying Yang Twins. It is the debut single from their third studio album Me & My Brother (2003) and was produced by Mr. Collipark.

On Me and My Brothers, the song is followed by a remix titled "Naggin' Part II (The Answer)", performed by Ms. Flawless and Tha Rhythum.

== Critical reception ==
Writing for AllMusic, Alex Henderson described the song as one of the "straight-up club-bangers" from Me and My Brothers. Gil Kaufman of Rolling Stone criticized the song along with the previous tracks of the album for misogyny, and described it as a "gripefest about women".

== Charts ==
Chart performance for "Naggin'"
Chart (2003–04)	Peak position
Australia (ARIA) with "Salt Shaker"	75
US Billboard Hot 100	87
US Hot R&B/Hip-Hop Songs (Billboard)	43
US Hot Rap Songs (Billboard)	21
US Rhythmic (Billboard)	33
