= Shake (Ying Yang Twins song) =

Single by Ying Yang Twins featuring Pitbull

from the album U.S.A. (United State of Atlanta) and Original Hits
- Released: August 23, 2005
- Recorded: 2005
- Genre: Hip hop
- Songwriters: Michael Crooms; Deongelo Holmes; Eric Jackson; George Kranz; Armando Christian Pérez; Pjarro Scott
- Producer: Mr. Collipark

Ying Yang Twins singles chronology
"Badd" (2005)	"Shake" (2005)	"Bedroom Boom" (2005)

Pitbull singles chronology
"Dammit Man" (2005)	"Shake" (2005)	"Hit the Floor" (2005)

"Shake" is the third single from the Ying Yang Twins album, U.S.A. (United State of Atlanta). It features the rapper Pitbull. The song contains a sample of "Din Daa Daa" by George Kranz.

The official remix features Pitbull with a new verse and Elephant Man, featured on the Ying Yang Twins' U.S.A. Still United and Pitbull's Money Is Still a Major Issue.

The song makes a reference to the songs "The New Workout Plan" by Kanye West and "Back That Azz Up" by Juvenile.

The music video had heavy airplay on BET, MTV and VH1. The video was directed by Life Garland.

For radio and television, a re-recorded version was released, replacing for instance "Where niggas go to see naked hoes" with "Where brothers go to see girls come out them clothes."

== Charts ==
Chart (2005)	Peak position
Scotland Singles (OCC)	44
UK Singles (OCC)	49
UK Hip Hop/R&B (OCC)	6
US Billboard Hot 100	41
US Hot R&B/Hip-Hop Songs (Billboard)	37
US Hot Rap Songs (Billboard)	12
US Rhythmic Airplay (Billboard)	7
