= Me & My Brother =

Studio album by Ying Yang Twins
- Released: September 16, 2003
- Recorded: 2003
- Studio: ColliPark Studio (Atlanta, GA); The Zone (Atlanta, GA); TDD Studios (Miami, FL); The Sound Lab Studios (Smyrna, GA)
- Genre: Southern hip hop; crunk
- Length: 61:37
- Label: TVT
- Producer: Mr. Collipark; Lil Jon; Derrick Williams

Ying Yang Twins chronology
Alley: The Return of the Ying Yang Twins (2002)	Me & My Brother (2003)	My Brother & Me (2004)

Singles from Me & My Brother
- 1. "Naggin'" Released: June 17, 2003; 2. "Salt Shaker" Released: October 7, 2003; 3. "What's Happenin!" Released: April 20, 2004; 4. "Georgia Dome" Released: June 1, 2004

Professional ratings
Review scores
Source	Rating
AllMusic	3.5/5 stars
RapReviews	6/10
Robert Christgau	(3-star Honorable Mention)
Rolling Stone	2/5 stars

Me & My Brother is the third studio album by American hip hop duo Ying Yang Twins. It was released on September 16, 2003, through TVT Records. Recording sessions took place at ColliPark Studio and The Zone in Atlanta, at TDD Studios in Miami, and at The Sound Lab Studios in Smyrna, GA. Production was handled by Mr. Collipark, Lil Jon and Derrick Williams. It features guest appearances from Bonecrusher, Hitman Sammy Sam, Khujo Goodie, Killer Mike, K.T., Ms. Flawless, Tha Rhythum, Trick Daddy, Lil' Jon & The East Side Boyz.

The album debuted at number 11 on the Billboard 200 with approximately 62,000 copies sold in the first week released. On April 12, 2005, it was certified Platinum by the Recording Industry Association of America with an excess of 1,000,000 copies sold in the United States.

It produced four singles: "Naggin'", "Salt Shaker", "What's Happenin!" and "Georgia Dome".

== Track listing ==
No.	Title	Writer(s)	Producer(s)	Length
1.	"Them Braves"	Michael Crooms	Mr. Collipark	1:20
2.	"Hanh!"	Eric Jackson; D'eongelo Holmes; M. Crooms	Mr. Collipark	4:04
3.	"What's Happenin!" (featuring Trick Daddy)	Jackson; Holmes; Maurice Young; M. Crooms	Mr. Collipark	4:20
4.	"Grey Goose"	Jackson; Holmes; M. Crooms	Mr. Collipark	5:32
5.	"Salt Shaker" (featuring Lil' Jon & the East Side Boyz)	Jackson; Holmes; Jonathan Smith; Craig Love; LaMarquis Jefferson	Lil' Jon	4:12
6.	"Georgia Dome (Get Low Sequel)"	Jackson; Holmes; M. Crooms	Mr. Collipark	6:06
7.	"What the Fuck!" (featuring Bone Crusher and Killer Mike)	Jackson; Holmes; Wayne Hardnett; Michael Render; M. Crooms	Mr. Collipark	4:54
8.	"Calling All Zones" (featuring Hitman Sammy Sam and Khujo)	Jackson; Holmes; Sammy King, Jr.; Willie Knighton; M. Crooms	Mr. Collipark	5:19
9.	"Me and My Brother"	Jackson; Holmes; M. Crooms	Mr. Collipark	6:27
10.	"Hard" (featuring K.T.)	Jackson; Holmes; Kerry Taylor; Derrick Williams	Derrick Williams	4:55
11.	"The Nerve Calmer"	Jackson; M. Crooms	Mr. Collipark	1:35
12.	"Naggin'"	Jackson; Holmes; M. Crooms	Mr. Collipark	4:24
13.	"Naggin, Pt. 2 (The Answer)" (performed by Ms. Flawless and Tha Rhythum)	Shandralia Alexander; Charlotte Crooms; Jackson; Holmes; M. Crooms	Mr. Collipark	4:25
14.	"Armageddon"	Jackson; Holmes; M. Crooms	Mr. Collipark	4:04
Total length:				61:37

== Personnel ==
- Eric "Kaine" Jackson – vocals, executive producer
- D'Angelo "D-Roc" Holmes – vocals, executive producer
- Maurice "Trick Daddy" Young – vocals (track 3)
- Jonathan "Lil' Jon" Smith – vocals & producer (track 5)
- Wayne "Bonecrusher" Hardnett – vocals (track 7)
- Michael "Killer Mike" Render – vocals (track 7)
- Vita "Bizar" Brinson – voice (track 7)
- Sammy "Hitman Sammy Sam" King Jr. – vocals (track 8)
- Willie "Khujo" Knighton – vocals (track 8)
- Kerry "KT" Taylor – vocals (track 10)
- Shandralia "Ms. Flawless" Alexander – vocals (track 13)
- Charlotte "Tha Rhythum" Crooms – vocals (track 13)
- William "Billy Hume" Whedbee – guitar (tracks: 6, 9), recording (tracks: 1, 7, 8, 10, 12, 13), mixing (tracks: 1–4, 6–14)
- Michael "Mr. Collipark" Crooms – producer (tracks: 1–4, 6–9, 11–14), recording (tracks: 1, 2, 4, 6–9, 11, 12, 14), mixing (tracks: 3, 4, 6–9, 12–14), executive producer
- Derrick Williams – producer & mixing (track 10)
- Devin Johnson – recording (tracks: 2, 3, 7, 9)
- Carlos Hernandez – recording (track 3)
- Jonathan Cantrell – recording (track 5)
- Ray Seay – mixing (track 5)
- Tony Gilles – mastering
- Bryan Leach – co-executive producer
- Benjamin Wheelock – design
- Michael Blackwell – photography
- Amy Duarte – A&R coordinator

== Charts ==
=== Weekly charts ===
Chart (2003)	Peak position
US Billboard 200	11
US Top R&B/Hip-Hop Albums (Billboard)	4

=== Year-end charts ===
Chart (2003)	Position
US Top R&B/Hip-Hop Albums (Billboard)	79
Chart (2004)	Position
US Billboard 200	93
US Top R&B/Hip-Hop Albums (Billboard)	33

== Certifications ==
Region	Certification	Certified units/sales
United States (RIAA)	Platinum	1,000,000^{^}
^{^} Shipments figures based on certification alone.
