= Who Dat Girl =

Single by Flo Rida featuring Akon

from the album Only One Flo (Part 1)
- Released: January 11, 2011
- Recorded: 2010
- Studio: Conway Recording; Dr. Luke's (Los Angeles, California)
- Genre: Electro-R&B; hip hop
- Length: 3:19
- Label: Atlantic; Poe Boy
- Songwriters: Flo Rida; Dr. Luke; Claude Kelly; Benny Blanco; Bruno Mars; Philip Lawrence
- Producers: Dr. Luke; Benny Blanco

Flo Rida singles chronology
"Turn Around (5, 4, 3, 2, 1)" (2010)	"Who Dat Girl" (2011)	"Dance with Me" (2011)

Akon singles chronology
"I Just Had Sex" (2010)	"Who Dat Girl" (2011)	"Boomerang" (2011)

"Who Dat Girl" is a song by American rapper Flo Rida. It features American singer Akon. The song was written by Flo Rida, Dr. Luke, Claude Kelly, Benny Blanco, Bruno Mars, and Philip Lawrence, and it was produced by Dr. Luke and Benny Blanco. It was released on January 11, 2011, as the third single from Flo Rida's third studio album, Only One Flo (Part 1). It peaked at number twenty-nine on the Billboard Hot 100.

== Chart performance ==
The song debuted at number fifty-five on the Billboard Hot 100 on the issue dated November 18, 2010. On the issue date of January 22, 2011, the song charted at number thirty-nine on the chart, selling 63,000 digital copies. The following week the song peaked at number twenty-nine, becoming his eighth top-thirty single. In Australia, the track debuted at No. 29 on April 4, 2011, and peaked at No. 10 in its fifth week on the chart.

== Music video ==
The music video was directed by Ray Kay. It premiered on December 2, 2010, on MTV. He shows his friend a picture of a girl on his laptop, and the friend accidentally spills liquid on it. The girl pops out of the laptop and throws a party at their house, like in the film Weird Science. In the video, Flo-Rida and Akon seem to be at a club scene, in which they are dancing with a few fairly good-looking ladies, covered in some substance in which looks like glow in the dark paint.

== Critical response ==
Lewis Corner of Digital Spy UK gave the song a negative review, giving the single 2 out of 5 stars, stating "Flo Rida's chart luck has been down of late, what with his last effort – and first solo track – just missing out on a spot in the top 40. His solution? Call in the big guns – in this instance Akon to launch him back to the top – and given that Flo considers himself the old-fashioned romantic sort at heart, there are no prizes for guessing which rapper took the reigns [sic] on his latest effort.

What's more, he's even roped in serial hitmaker Dr Luke to helm the track, who supplies a ready-made rubbery electro-R&B hook with a beat peeled off the 'California Gurls' cutting room floor. 'I imagine her topless/ she might set off my rocket,' Rida announces with a conviction that would make even Hugh Hefner blush, as Akon confesses his lass 'ain't no actress/ But she makes movies.' Who said romance was dead?"

== Personnel ==
- Songwriting – Flo Rida, Dr. Luke, Claude Kelly, Benjamin Levin, Bruno Mars, Philip Lawrence
- Production, instruments and programming – Dr. Luke, Benny Blanco
- Vocals – Flo Rida, Akon
- Engineering – Emily Wright, Chris "Tek" O'Ryan, Sam Holland
- Assistant engineering – Tatiana Gottwald
- Mixing – Serban Ghenea
- Mix engineer – John Hanes
- Assistant mix engineer – Tim Roberts
- Background vocals – Claude Kelly
- Remix Package – 8barz 8barz Music, LLC

== Charts ==
=== Weekly charts ===
Chart (2011)	Peak position
Australia (ARIA)	10
Austria (Ö3 Austria Top 40)	45
Belgium (Ultratip Bubbling Under Flanders)	17
Canada Hot 100 (Billboard)	16
Germany Airplay (Nielsen Company)	35
UK Hip Hop/R&B (Official Charts)	22
UK Singles (Official Charts)	64
US Billboard Hot 100	29
US Hot R&B/Hip-Hop Songs (Billboard)	65
US Pop Airplay (Billboard)	23
US Rhythmic Airplay (Billboard)	21

=== Year-end charts ===
Chart (2011)	Position
Australia (ARIA)	83

== Certifications ==
Region	Certification	Certified units/sales
Australia (ARIA)	Platinum	70,000^{^}
Canada (Music Canada)	Platinum	80,000^{*}
^{*} Sales figures based on certification alone.^{^} Shipments figures based on certification alone.
