= My Brother & Me =

Compilation album by Ying Yang Twins
- Released: November 2, 2004
- Recorded: 2004
- Genre: Southern hip hop; crunk
- Length: 46:06
- Label: TVT Records
- Producer: Mr. Collipark, Lil Jon, Just Blaze

Ying Yang Twins chronology
Me & My Brother (2003)	My Brother & Me (2004)	U.S.A. (United State of Atlanta) (2005)

Singles from My Brother & Me
- 1. "Halftime (Stand Up & Get Crunk!)" Released: 2004; 2. "In Da Club" Released: 2004

Professional ratings
Review scores
Source	Rating
Allmusic	3.5/5 stars
RapReviews	5/10

My Brother & Me is the first remix album by American hip hop duo Ying Yang Twins. It was released on November 2, 2004. The album reached #12 on the U.S. charts and #68 on the UK Albums Chart. The album mainly consists of remixes of former hits by both Ying Yang Twins and other rappers.

== Track listing ==
1. "Halftime (Stand Up & Get Crunk!)" (featuring Homebwoi) - 4:31
2. "Slow Motion [Remix]" (featuring Juvenile, Wyclef Jean, Skip, & Wacko) - 4:09
3. "Take Ya Clothes Off" (featuring Bone Crusher) - 3:51
4. "Do It" (featuring Da Muzicianz & Nue Breed) - 4:33
5. "In Da Club" (featuring Yonnie) - 4:17
6. "Me & My Brother [Remix]" (featuring YoungBloodZ) - 4:01
7. "Get Crunk Shorty" (Nick Cannon featuring Ying Yang Twins & Fatman Scoop) - 4:11
8. "Georgia Dome [Remix]" (featuring Jacki-O & Fatman Scoop) - 4:52
9. "Salt Shaker [Remix]" (featuring Lil Jon, Fat Joe, Juvenile, Fatman Scoop & Murphy Lee) - 4:48
10. "Salt Shaker [Extended Remix]" (featuring Lil Jon, Murphy Lee, Fat Joe, Jacki-O, Fatman Scoop, Juvenile, B.G. & Pitbull) - 8:23
11. "What's Happnin!" [multimedia track]
12. "Salt Shaker" [multimedia track]
13. "Naggin'" [multimedia track]
14. "Performance from the 2004 BET Awards" [multimedia track]
15. "Performance from the WB Presents Pepsi Smash" [multimedia track]
16. "MTV Cribs appearance" [DVD]
