= Get Silly =

Single by V.I.C.

from the album Beast
- Released: February 14, 2008
- Recorded: August 2007
- Genre: Snap
- Length: 3:50
- Label: Warner Bros.
- Songwriters: Victor Ganz; DeAndre Way; Michael Crooms
- Producers: Mr. Collipark; Soulja Boy Tell 'Em; The Package Store

V.I.C. singles chronology
"Get Silly" (2008)	"Wobble" (2008)

Music video
- "Get Silly" on YouTube

"Get Silly" is a song by Ghanaian American rapper V.I.C. from his album Beast, produced by Mr. Collipark, Soulja Boy Tell 'Em, and The Package Store. "Get Silly" was certified Gold by the RIAA on November 13, 2008, for sales of over 500,000.

== Music video ==
The video features V.I.C. and Soulja Boy Tell 'Em "getting silly". It premiered on BET's 106 & Park on February 14, 2008, and was added to his official YouTube channel on February 26, 2008.

== Remix ==
The official remix, featuring Soulja Boy Tell 'Em, Bun B, E-40, Unk, Polow da Don, and Jermaine Dupri, is the final track on the album Beast and is a digital download single. The extended version of the remix features additional verses by Arab, Big Kuntry King, Bubba Sparxxx, Pitbull, and Tex James. An alternative version of the extended remix features a verse by Jay Rock in place of Pitbull.

Lil Wayne released a freestyle in late November 2008 for his mixtape Dedication 3. It is titled "Get Bizzy" and features Gudda Gudda. Nicki Minaj made a freestyle in 2009 which is featured on her mixtape Beam Me Up Scotty. Tay-K released a freestyle in late 2018.

== Charts ==
=== Weekly charts ===
Chart (2008)	Peak position
US Billboard Hot 100	29
US Hot R&B/Hip-Hop Songs (Billboard)	13
US Pop Airplay (Billboard)	36
US Hot Rap Songs (Billboard)	5
US Rhythmic Airplay (Billboard)	12

=== Year-end charts ===
Chart (2008)	Position
US Hot R&B/Hip-Hop Songs (Billboard)	68

== Certifications ==
Region	Certification	Certified units/sales
United States (RIAA)	Gold	500,000^{‡}
^{‡} Sales+streaming figures based on certification alone.
