= Dangerous (Ying Yang Twins song) =

Single by Ying Yang Twins featuring Wyclef Jean

from the album Chemically Imbalanced
- Released: October 14, 2006
- Recorded: 2006
- Genre: Hip hop; crunk
- Length: 4:20
- Label: TVT
- Songwriters: Eric Jackson; De'Angelo Holmes; Sara Allen; Daryl Hall; John Oates; Huddie "Lead Belly" Ledbetter; Michael Crooms; Wyclef Jean; Jerry 'Wonder' Duplessis
- Producers: Mr. Collipark; Wyclef Jean; Jerry 'Wonder' Duplessis

Ying Yang Twins singles chronology
"Git It" (2006)	"Dangerous" (2006)	"All the Way (Live)" (2011)

Wyclef Jean singles chronology
"Hips Don't Lie" (2006)	"Dangerous" (2006)	"Five-O" (2007)

"Dangerous" is the first single by the Ying Yang Twins taken from their album Chemically Imbalanced.

== Song information ==
The song features Wyclef Jean and Mr. Collipark, and is produced by Wyclef Jean. It contains samples from Ram Jam's version of Black Betty. It also interpolates the chorus of the Hall & Oates song "Maneater".

== Music video ==
The "Dangerous" music video is based on the movie Sin City, beginning by "Twin City" and like Sin City it is completely in black and white style with occasional colorization including the girls in the video who are in color. The music video was directed by Melina.

== Charts ==
Chart (2006–2007)	Peak position
Australia (ARIA)	98
Australia Urban (ARIA)	22
Finland (Suomen virallinen lista)	7
Germany (GfK)	82
New Zealand (Recorded Music NZ)	6
US Billboard Hot 100	85
US Hot R&B/Hip-Hop Songs (Billboard)	84
US Pop 100 (Billboard)	71

== Certifications ==
Certifications for Dangerous
Region	Certification	Certified units/sales
New Zealand (RMNZ)	Gold	15,000^{‡}
^{‡} Sales+streaming figures based on certification alone.

== Release history ==
Release dates and formats for "High School Never Ends"
Region	Date	Format	Label(s)	Ref.
United States	October 16, 2006	Mainstream airplay	TVT	
