= Wait (The Whisper Song) =

Single by Ying Yang Twins

from the album U.S.A. (United State of Atlanta)
- Released: March 1, 2005
- Recorded: 2005
- Genre: Snap; dirty rap
- Length: 2:59
- Label: TVT Records
- Songwriters: Michael Crooms; Deongelo Holmes; Eric Jackson
- Producer: Mr. Collipark

Ying Yang Twins singles chronology
"In da Club" (2004)	"Wait (The Whisper Song)" (2005)	"Badd" (2005)

"Wait (The Whisper Song)" is a song by American crunk duo Ying Yang Twins, It was released on March 1, 2005, as the lead single from their fourth studio album, U.S.A. (United State of Atlanta) (2005). The song consists of a minimal bass pulse, a few finger-snaps, and whispered, sexually explicit lyrics. The song's unique sound was mixed by Atlanta sound engineer Joel Mullis, who is currently affiliated with the production company 340 Music. "Wait" became a hit single, reaching No. 15 on the Billboard Hot 100.

== Content ==
The song interprets a man rhythmically whispering sexually explicit messages into a woman's ear, with her becoming interested and sexually turned-on. The song is well-known for the radio/edited versions featuring female moans and vocalizations—instead of “blips” or silence—over many of the sexual words. The chorus, one of the song’s most memorable parts, says "beat the p***y up" several times, with a sexually-suggestive woman gasping each time the word “p***y” is said.

The song was parodied by the Lonely Island's Akiva Schaffer and Jorma Taccone on Saturday Night Live in a sketch titled "Bing Bong Brothers". It was also parodied by video game comedy band Starbomb in the song "Nintendo Online's Greatest Announcement" from their 2024 album, Starbomb Boom: Rise of Lyrics.

Sarah and Naomi from the R&B group Electrik Red are seen in the music video.

The official remix version of the song features Lil Scrappy, Busta Rhymes, Missy Elliott and Free.

The video features Regina King, Kerry Washington, Michelle Van Der Water, and future Big Brother houseguest, Brittany Martinez, among others.

In 2022, American R&B singer Bryson Tiller sampled the song for his single "Outside". The Ying Yang Twins appeared in the music video to the song.

The song is referenced in Canadian singer-songwriter Tate McRae's single "Sports Car", with its whispery chorus, after co-writer Julia Michaels said she wanted a "pop girl" to recreate the song.

== Track listing ==
Australian CD single
No.	Title	Length
1.	"Wait (The Whisper Song)" (Clean Version)	3:03
2.	"Wait (The Whisper Song)" (Non-Suggestive) (Radio Mix)	3:02
3.	"Wait (The Whisper Song)" (Street Version)	3:02
4.	"Wait (The Whisper Song)" (Acapella)	2:44
5.	"Wait (The Whisper Song)" (Director's Cut Video)	3:19
Total length:		11:48

European CD single
No.	Title	Length
1.	"Wait (The Whisper Song)" (Street Version)
2.	"Wait (The Whisper Song)" (Clean Version)

European enhanced CD single
No.	Title	Length
1.	"Wait (The Whisper Song)" (Street Version)
2.	"Wait (The Whisper Song)" (Non-Suggestive) (Radio Mix)
3.	"Wait (The Whisper Song)" (Clean Version)
4.	"Wait (The Whisper Song)" (Acapella)
5.	"Wait (The Whisper Song)" (Director's Cut Video)

UK 12-inch vinyl – Side A
No.	Title	Length
1.	"Wait (The Whisper Song)"
2.	"What's Happnin!" (featuring Trick Daddy)

UK 12-inch vinyl – Side B
No.	Title	Length
1.	"Wait (The Whisper Song)" (Remix) (featuring Busta Rhymes, Missy Elliott, Lil Scrappy, Free & Mr. Collipark)
2.	"What's Happnin!" (featuring Trick Daddy and Pitbull)

UK CD single
No.	Title	Length
1.	"Wait (The Whisper Song)"	3:05
2.	"Wait (The Whisper Song)" (Remix) (featuring Busta Rhymes, Missy Elliott, Lil Scrappy, Free & Mr. Collipark)	4:05
3.	"What's Happnin!" (featuring Trick Daddy and Pitbull)	4:38
4.	"Wait (The Whisper Song)" (Video)	5:14

US 12-inch vinyl – Side A
No.	Title	Length
1.	"Wait (The Whisper Song)" (Clean)
2.	"Wait (The Whisper Song)" (Non-Suggestive Radio Mix)
3.	"Wait (The Whisper Song)" (Street)

US 12-inch vinyl – Side B
No.	Title	Length
1.	"Wait (The Whisper Song)" (Instrumental)
2.	"Wait (The Whisper Song)" (Acapella)

US Remix 12-inch vinyl – Side A
No.	Title	Length
1.	"Wait (The Whisper Song)" (Remix) (Radio) (featuring Busta Rhymes, Missy Elliott, Lil Scrappy, Free & Mr. Collipark)
2.	"Wait (The Whisper Song)" (Remix) (Street) (featuring Busta Rhymes, Missy Elliott, Lil Scrappy, Free & Mr. Collipark)

US Remix 12-inch vinyl – Side B
No.	Title	Length
1.	"Wait (The Whisper Song)" (Remix) (Instrumental)
2.	"Wait (The Whisper Song)" (Remix) (Acapella) (featuring Busta Rhymes, Missy Elliott, Lil Scrappy, Free & Mr. Collipark)

== Charts ==
=== Weekly charts ===
Chart (2005)	Peak position
Australia (ARIA)	67
Belgium (Ultratip Bubbling Under Flanders)	2
Germany (GfK)	59
Netherlands (Dutch Top 40 Tipparade)	2
Netherlands (Single Top 100)	41
Scotland Singles (OCC)	59
UK Hip Hop/R&B (OCC)	4
UK Singles (OCC)	47
US Billboard Hot 100	15
US Hot R&B/Hip-Hop Songs (Billboard)	3
US Hot Rap Songs (Billboard)	2
US Rhythmic Airplay (Billboard)	7

=== Year-end charts ===
Chart (2005)	Position
US Billboard Hot 100	63

== Release history ==
Region	Date	Format(s)	Label	Ref.
United States	February 22, 2005	Urban contemporary radio	TVT	
United States	May 3, 2005	Contemporary hit radio	TVT	
