= Ying Yang Forever =

Studio album by Ying Yang Twins
- Released: September 1, 2009
- Recorded: 2008–2009
- Genre: Southern hip-hop; crunk
- Length: 62:58
- Label: Deep Entertainment
- Producer: Joe Traxx

Ying Yang Twins chronology
The Official Work (2008)	Ying Yang Forever (2009)

Ying Yang Forever is the sixth studio album by American Southern hip-hop duo Ying Yang Twins. It was released on September 1, 2009, through Deep Entertainment. Produced by Joe Traxx, it features guest appearances from Da Muzicianz and Lil' Jon.

== Track listing ==
No.	Title	Writer(s)	Length
1.	"We Back Intro"		0:29
2.	"Ying Yang Forever"	Eric Jackson; DeAngelo Holmes; Joseph Howard Jr.	4:55
3.	"Yall Ain't Ready" (featuring C-Moe)	Jackson; D. Holmes; Christopher T. Moore; Howard Jr.	4:44
4.	"Centipede" (featuring Lil' Jon)	Jackson; D. Holmes; Jonathan Smith; Howard Jr.	4:16
5.	"Top Model"	Jackson; D. Holmes; Howard Jr.	3:50
6.	"Put It on Me" (featuring Kory B)	Jackson; D. Holmes; Howard Jr.; Moore	4:02
7.	"Pop da Trunk" (featuring Rachel)	Jackson; D. Holmes; Howard Jr.	2:55
8.	"Mad" (featuring Sydnee J)	Jackson; D. Holmes; Sydnee L. Simpson; Howard Jr.; Dejashatun Williams	3:29
9.	"I'm Still Hustlin Intro"		0:55
10.	"I'm Hustlin" (featuring Mr. Ball)	Jackson; D. Holmes; Brandon Sams; Howard Jr.	4:44
11.	"The Girl Is a Hoe" (featuring C-Moe)	Jackson; D. Holmes; Moore; Howard Jr.	3:14
12.	"So Cold" (featuring C-Moe and Kory B)	Jackson; D. Holmes; Howard Jr.; Sams; Courtney Holmes; Earnest Natt	4:22
13.	"Do It"	Jackson; D. Holmes; Howard Jr.	4:01
14.	"Holla at a Bitch"	Jackson; D. Holmes; Howard Jr.	3:17
15.	"Closet Freak"	Jackson; D. Holmes; Howard Jr.; Kory Allan Burton	2:31
16.	"Get a Lil Low" (featuring Da Muzicianz)	Jackson; D. Holmes; Sams; C. Holmes; Howard Jr.; Natt	3:39
17.	"Earthquake" (featuring Da Muzicianz)	Jackson; D. Holmes; Sams; C. Holmes; Howard Jr.; Natt; Burton	3:35
18.	"Fever" (featuring Ami Miller)	Jackson; D. Holmes; Ami Miller; Howard Jr.	4:00
Total length:			62:58

Notes

- "Fever" is listed as a bonus track available on physical copies.
- Digital version has 5 additional songs added throughout the album.
