= Thug Walkin' =

Studio album by Ying Yang Twins
- Released: April 25, 2000
- Recorded: 1999–2000
- Studio: Whippoorwill Sound; Rondelay Studios
- Genre: Hip hop; southern hip hop; crunk
- Length: 58:17
- Label: Collipark Records; Universal Records
- Producer: Mr. Collipark; Keith "K-Luv" Chapman

Ying Yang Twins chronology
Thug Walkin' (2000)	Alley: The Return of the Ying Yang Twins (2002)

Singles from Thug Walkin'
- 1. "Whistle While You Twurk" Released: March 12, 2000; 2. "Ying Yang in This Thang" Released: 2000

Professional ratings
Review scores
Source	Rating
Allmusic	2/5 stars
RapReviews	5/10 stars

Thug Walkin' is the debut studio album by American hip hop duo Ying Yang Twins. It was released on April 25, 2000, through Collipark/Universal Records. The album peaked at #54 on the Top R&B/Hip-Hop Albums, #15 on the Heatseekers Albums and #10 on the Independent Albums.

== Track listing ==
No.	Title	Length
1.	"Ying Yang in This Thang" (featuring The Hoodratz)	4:44
2.	"Ballin' G's"	5:03
3.	"Whistle While You Twurk" (ColliPark Remix)	4:25
4.	"Brang Yo Azz Outdoz"	5:43
5.	"Ying Yang Vs. Lil Jon & The Eastside Boyz"	4:48
6.	"Thug Walkin'"	5:07
7.	"The Warm Up" (featuring The Hoodratz)	3:18
8.	"Dispose of Brawdz"	5:07
9.	"A!" (featuring Chyna Dawg)	4:40
10.	"The Dope Game"	6:45
11.	"Whistle While You Twurk (E.A. Mix)" (featuring DJ Kizzy Rock & Mr. Ball)	4:29
12.	"Whistle While You Twurk" (ColliPark Clean Mix)	4:08
13.	"Back Up! (Move Away)"	4:33
Total length:		58:17

== Charts ==
Chart (2000)	Peak position
US Top R&B/Hip-Hop Albums (Billboard)	54
US Heatseekers Albums (Billboard)	15
US Independent Albums (Billboard)	10
