= Wobble (song) =

2008 single by V.I.C.

Single by V.I.C.

from the album Beast
- Released: July 15, 2008
- Recorded: 2008
- Genre: Hip-hop
- Length: 5:22 (album version); 3:48 (radio edit)
- Label: Warner Bros.
- Songwriters: Victor Sally; Frank Rodriguez; Michael "Mr. Collipark" Crooms; Johnathan "John Boy" Wright; Pjarro Scott
- Producer: Mr. Collipark

V.I.C. singles chronology
"Get Silly" (2008)	"Wobble" (2008)	"Say Bow" (2009)

Music video
- "Wobble" on YouTube

"Wobble", also referred to as "Wobble Baby", is a song by American rapper V.I.C., released by Warner Bros. Records on July 15, 2008 as the second single from his debut album, Beast (2008). The song was produced by Mr. Collipark. Atlanta's V-103 former radio personality Frank Ski is featured on the song on the intro and bridge, but isn't credited as a featured artist. On the album, the song is preceded by the track "Wobble (Skit)".

"Wobble" inspired a dance craze in the late 2000s and early 2010s. The song made its debut on the US Hot R&B/Hip-Hop Songs chart at number 89 on June 2, 2011, almost three years after its release, and has since peaked at number 77. It went on to debut at number 94 on the US Billboard Hot 100 on January 7, 2012. Despite lukewarm chart success, it has been certified platinum four times by the Recording Industry Association of America (RIAA). Furthermore, it saw a minor resurgence in the early 2020s on the video sharing platform TikTok. It has since become a popular dance song at gatherings.

== Track listing ==
=== Promo CD single ===
1. "Wobble (Skit)" (Main)
2. "Wobble" (Song)
3. "Wobble" (Instrumental)
4. "Wobble" (Acapella)

== Charts ==
Chart (2011–12)	Peak position
US Billboard Hot 100	94
US Hot R&B/Hip-Hop Songs (Billboard)	77

== Certifications ==
Region	Certification	Certified units/sales
United States (RIAA)	4× Platinum	4,000,000^{‡}
^{‡} Sales+streaming figures based on certification alone.
