= The Official Work =

Mixtape by Ying Yang Twins
- Released: August 26, 2008
- Recorded: 2007–2008
- Genre: Southern hip-hop
- Length: 42:05
- Label: BCD Music Group

Ying Yang Twins chronology
Chemically Imbalanced (2006)	The Official Work (2008)	Ying Yang Forever (2009)

Professional ratings
Review scores
Source	Rating
PopMatters	2/10
RapReviews	5/10

The Official Work is a mixtape by American Southern hip-hop duo Ying Yang Twins. It was released on August 26, 2008 via BCD Music Group. The album debuted at number 49 on the Independent Albums, number 39 on the Top R&B/Hip-Hop Albums and number 19 on the Top Rap Albums charts in the United States.

== Track listing ==
No.	Title	Length
1.	"Rollin'"	3:42
2.	"Ying Yanguage (Skit)"	0:57
3.	"Don't Trip"	4:06
4.	"Swag"	3:15
5.	"What Ying Yang Mean (Skit)"	0:27
6.	"Ochee"	3:50
7.	"Go"	3:31
8.	"3, 6, 9"	0:09
9.	"Juaah"	4:11
10.	"Look Back at It"	4:20
11.	"How Dat Shit Came Upon (Skit)"	0:15
12.	"Whoop Ass"	3:22
13.	"Outside Da Box (Skit)"	0:37
14.	"Cheech & Chong"	3:50
15.	"Ying Meets the Yang (Skit)"	0:23
16.	"Wind"	4:59
17.	"Music from the Soul (Skit)"	0:11
Total length:		42:05

== Charts ==
Chart (2008)	Peak position
US Independent Albums (Billboard)	49
US Top R&B/Hip-Hop Albums (Billboard)	39
US Top Rap Albums (Billboard)	19
