= Club Can't Handle Me =

2010 single by Flo Rida

Single by Flo Rida featuring David Guetta

from the album Only One Flo (Part 1) and Step Up 3D
- B-side: "Fresh I Stay"
- Released: June 28, 2010
- Recorded: 2010
- Studio: Paramount Studios (Hollywood, CA)
- Genre: Hip house
- Length: 3:52
- Label: Atlantic
- Songwriters: Tramar Dillard; Carmen Key; Kasia Livingston; Mike Caren; David Guetta; Frédéric Riesterer; Giorgio Tuinfort
- Producers: David Guetta; Frédéric Riesterer

Flo Rida singles chronology
"Feel It" (2010)	"Club Can't Handle Me" (2010)	"iYiYi" (2010)

David Guetta singles chronology
"Commander" (2010)	"Club Can't Handle Me" (2010)	"Who's That Chick?" (2010)

Music video
- "Club Can't Handle Me" on YouTube

"Club Can't Handle Me" is a song by American rapper Flo Rida, featuring French disc jockey, David Guetta. It was released for digital download on iTunes on June 28, 2010, and as the lead single of the Step Up 3D soundtrack album. It is also included on Flo Rida's third studio album, Only One Flo (Part 1).

The song topped the charts in Ireland, Poland, Portugal and the United Kingdom, and became a top five hit in Australia, Belgium (Flanders), Canada, Finland, Germany, New Zealand, and the Netherlands. In the United States, it peaked at number nine on the Billboard Hot 100. By December 2013, the song had sold 3 million copies in the US. The music video was filmed in Los Angeles and was directed by Marc Klasfeld.

== Background and composition ==
"Club Can't Handle Me" was written by Flo Rida, Carmen Key, Kasia Livingston, Mike Caren, David Guetta, Frédéric Riesterer and Giorgio Tuinfort. Carmen Key sings background vocals during the chorus. Guetta was originally approached by Flo Rida's recording company, which asked whether Guetta would agree to produce songs for the rapper. The DJ, who often played Flo Rida's "Low" alongside "Love Is Gone" (his own collaboration with Chris Willis) when working in clubs, agreed. Flo Rida, who described the song as a "club anthem", said he always looked up to Guetta and that they both appreciated each others' earlier works. "Club Can't Handle Me" first premiered on Flo Rida's official website on June 9, 2010. On June 28, the song became available to download on iTunes. The song promotes the Step Up 3D film, and is the lead single of its soundtrack. The song is Flo Rida's 5th Top 10 hit.

== Critical reception ==
Nick Levine of Digital Spy gave the song four stars out of five writing, "'Club Can't Handle Me' is a whopping great party banger – perhaps Guetta's straight up funnest [sic] production since 'I Gotta Feeling'. Of course, Flo's lyrics are a parade of insane nonsense, as is the very concept behind the song." A reviewer from Billboard gave the song a positive review, calling the song "infectious", and stating, "Guetta provides an escalating beat – not unlike the one for The Black Eyed Peas' "I Gotta Feeling" – while Flo Rida delivers the sort of dependable party lyrics that put him on the map."

== Live performances ==
On July 14, 2010, Flo Rida performed the song during The Tonight Show with Jay Leno. He performed the song on August 2 on The Wendy Williams Show, on August 3 on Jimmy Kimmel Live!, and on August 5 on So You Think You Can Dance. The song was also featured in a dance routine to promote Step Up 3D on Late Night with Jimmy Fallon on August 13. On September 9, he had performed it live on ASAP XV, a Filipino variety show.

== Music video ==
The music video for "Club Can't Handle Me" was directed by Marc Klasfeld and filmed in Los Angeles. It premiered E! channel's "Daily 10" segment on July 15 and 16, 2010, on YouTube. On the same day, it was also uploaded on Flo Rida's official YouTube account. The video is taking place during an "opulent, extravagant club party", where Flo Rida raps in front of a crowd, while David Guetta is a DJ. It also features scenes taken from the Step Up 3D film. Flo Rida said of the video: "If you've ever dreamed about having the biggest party of your life, "Club Can't Handle Me" definitely represents that. Lotta energy. Lot of diamonds, ice sculptures. Just showing that boss vibe."

== Track listing ==
Digital download
No.	Title	Length
1.	"Club Can't Handle Me" (Prod By David Guetta)	3:52
2.	"Fresh I Stay" (Prod By Raphael RJ2)	3:05
3.	"Club Can't Handle Me" (Sidney Samson Remix)	6:04
4.	"Club Can't Handle Me" (Ridney Vocal Remix)	6:10
5.	"Club Can't Handle Me" (Felguk Remix)	5:51
6.	"Club Can't Handle Me" (Manufactured Superstars Remix)	5:15
7.	"Club Can't Handle Me" (David Guetta FMIF Remix)	4:54

German CD single
No.	Title	Length
1.	"Club Can't Handle Me" (Prod By David Guetta)	3:53
2.	"Fresh I Stay" (Prod By Raphael RJ2)	3:05

== Charts ==
=== Weekly charts ===
Weekly chart performance for "Club Can't Handle Me"
Chart (2010–2011)	Peak position
Australia (ARIA)	3
Austria (Ö3 Austria Top 40)	3
Belgium (Ultratop 50 Flanders)	5
Belgium (Ultratop 50 Wallonia)	4
Canada Hot 100 (Billboard)	4
Canada CHR/Top 40 (Billboard)	4
Canada Hot AC (Billboard)	5
Czech Republic Airplay (ČNS IFPI)	4
Denmark (Tracklisten)	21
Europe (European Hot 100 Singles)	4
Finland (Suomen virallinen lista)	5
France Download (SNEP)	5
Germany (GfK)	4
Hungary (Dance Top 40)	2
Hungary (Rádiós Top 40)	2
Hungary (Single Top 40)	4
Ireland (IRMA)	1
Israel International Airplay (Media Forest)	1
Italy (FIMI)	7
Italian Airplay (EarOne)	40
Luxembourg Digital Songs (Billboard)	3
Mexican Anglo Airplay (Monitor Latino)	1
Netherlands (Dutch Top 40)	2
Netherlands (Single Top 100)	10
New Zealand (Recorded Music NZ)	3
Norway (VG-lista)	7
Poland Airplay (ZPAV)	1
Poland Dance (ZPAV)	26
Russia Airplay (TopHit)	15
Scottish Singles Sales (Official Charts)	1
Slovakia Airplay (ČNS IFPI)	8
Spain (Promusicae)	4
Sweden (Sverigetopplistan)	11
Switzerland (Schweizer Hitparade)	3
UK Singles (Official Charts)	1
UK Dance (Official Charts)	1
US Billboard Hot 100	9
US Adult Pop Airplay (Billboard)	36
US Dance Club Songs (Billboard)	23
US Hot Latin Songs (Billboard)	27
US Hot Rap Songs (Billboard)	12
US Pop Airplay (Billboard)	7
US Rhythmic Airplay (Billboard)	11

Chart (2013)	Peak position
France (SNEP)	72
Hungary (Single Top 40)	4

=== Year-end charts ===
2010 year-end chart performance for "Club Can't Handle Me"
Chart (2010)	Position
Australia (ARIA)	18
Austria (Ö3 Austria Top 40)	14
Belgium (Ultratop Flanders)	33
Belgium (Ultratop Wallonia)	43
Brazil (Crowley)	70
Canada (Canadian Hot 100)	22
Germany (Official German Charts)	31
Hungary (Dance Top 40)	29
Hungary (Rádiós Top 40)	26
Ireland (IRMA)	16
Italy (FIMI)	61
Netherlands (Dutch Top 40)	9
Netherlands (Single Top 100)	44
New Zealand (RIANZ)	24
Romania (Romanian Top 100)	78
Russia Airplay (TopHit)	115
Spain (PROMUSICAE)	25
Sweden (Sverigetopplistan)	43
Switzerland (Schweizer Hitparade)	24
Taiwan (Hito Radio)	99
UK Singles (Official Charts Company)	20
US Billboard Hot 100	40
US Mainstream Top 40 (Billboard)	35

2011 year-end chart performance for "Club Can't Handle Me"
Chart (2011)	Position
Brazil (Crowley)	100
Canada (Canadian Hot 100)	77
Hungary (Dance Top 40)	49
Hungary (Rádiós Top 40)	16

== Certifications ==
Certifications for "Club Can't Handle Me"
Region	Certification	Certified units/sales
Australia (ARIA)	3× Platinum	210,000^{^}
Austria (IFPI Austria)	Platinum	30,000^{*}
Belgium (BRMA)	Gold	15,000^{*}
Canada (Music Canada)	3× Platinum	240,000^{*}
Denmark (IFPI Danmark)	Platinum	90,000^{‡}
Germany (BVMI)	3× Gold	450,000^{‡}
Italy (FIMI)	Platinum	30,000^{*}
Japan (RIAJ)	Gold	100,000^{*}
Mexico (AMPROFON)	Gold	30,000^{*}
New Zealand (RMNZ)	3× Platinum	90,000^{‡}
Spain (Promusicae)	Platinum	40,000^{*}
Switzerland (IFPI Switzerland)	Platinum	30,000^{^}
United Kingdom (BPI)	2× Platinum	1,200,000^{‡}
United States (RIAA)	3× Platinum	3,025,000
^{*} Sales figures based on certification alone.^{^} Shipments figures based on certification alone.^{‡} Sales+streaming figures based on certification alone.

== Release history ==
Release dates for "Club Can't Handle Me"
Region	Date	Format
Worldwide	June 28, 2010	Digital download
United Kingdom	August 2, 2010	CD single, digital download
Germany	August 20, 2010	CD single

== See also ==
- List of number-one singles of 2010 (Ireland)
- List of number-one singles of 2010 (Poland)
- List of number-one singles of 2010 (Scotland)
- List of number-one singles from the 2010s (UK)
