= Din Daa Daa =

Single by George Kranz

from the album My Rhythm
- Released: 1983
- Genre: Dance
- Length: 4:06 (original version); 3:23 (radio edit); 6:21 (US mix)
- Label: Pool; Personal
- Songwriter: George Kranz
- Producers: Christopher Franke; George Kranz

Music video
- Version 1 on YouTube; Version 2 on YouTube

Alternative cover
- 2001 remix

"Din Daa Daa" (also released as "Trommeltanz (Din Daa Daa)" or as "Din Daa Daa (Trommeltanz)", from German Trommel + Tanz, "drum dance") is a song written and performed by German musician George Kranz, released as a single in 1983. His only international success, "Din Daa Daa" became a club hit which peaked at number one for two weeks on the US Dance chart. It also charted in several European countries.

The song title loop, the echo between Kranz's onomatopoeia and his drum solos, and the synthesizer sounds which can be heard afterwards are the main characteristics of this song.

Regarded as a dance classic and as a precursor of human beatboxing, artists still refer to this song today. The song has been sampled, covered or remixed by many artists, including M|A|R|R|S, Kevin Aviance, Pulsedriver, Flo Rida and The Roots.

== Background ==
From 1980 to 1983, George Kranz was a drummer in the NDW Berliner band Zeitgeist, founded at the end of the year 1980, which emerged from another band called Firma 33. In 1983, Zeitgeist disbanded and Kranz began a solo career.

Developed from a drum solo, "Din Daa Daa" was produced by Tangerine Dream's Christopher Franke and co-produced by Kranz.

== Composition and description ==
"Din Daa Daa" is probably best remembered for its characteristic, repetitive "Din Daa Daa" lyrics, hence the title. While these lyrics loop throughout the song, Kranz sings busier and busier drum figures—which sound like "Rat-ta-ta-ta-toom!"—and plays a heavy backbeat. He then duplicates his vocals on his drum kit, creating a call and response pattern. The song also features a strident synth chord. The song's tempo is 122 bpm and its original title, Trommeltanz, means "drum dance" in German.

Its peculiarity is often highlighted; the song has been described by The Police's Stewart Copeland as "a dialogue between a chimpanzee and a drummer" while The Guardian's presentation of the song notes that Kranz has a "serious case of onomatopoeia".

== Chart performance ==
"Din Daa Daa" saw most of its success in Europe, where it charted in several countries. The single peaked at number 25 in Belgium and at number 45 in France, where it spent three weeks on both national charts. It also peaked at number 88 in UK at the end of the year 1983. In Kranz's native Germany, the track peaked at number 28 and spent 12 weeks on the charts, from February to May 1984.

In the United States, the single became a club smash, spending two weeks at number one on the Billboard Dance Club Play chart in January 1984, before being knocked off by Laid Back's "White Horse". It also charted on the Black Singles chart, peaking at number 61, and on the Bubbling Under Hot 100 Singles, peaking at number 10. It also became a club hit in France, peaking at number 3 on the clubs chart.

=== Remixes ===
Following its initial release, "Din Daa Daa" has been remixed several times and new versions of the song were released in 1991, 1996 and 2001.

- A first remix of the song, called "Din Daa Daa '91", was released as a single on 7 June 1991. This version peaked at number eight on the Dance chart and at number 33 on the Hot Dance Music/Maxi-Singles Sales chart. It features vocals by Doug Lazy.
- On 10 June 1996, other remixes were released on the same CD single.
- In 2001, Pulsedriver remixed the song under the name "Pulsedriver vs. George Kranz – Din Daa Daa". This remix charted in Austria and in Germany, peaking at number 42 in both countries.

=== Weekly charts ===
Chart (1983–1984)	Peak position
Belgium (Ultratop 50 Flanders)	25
France (SNEP)	45
Germany (GfK)	28
UK Singles (Official Charts)	88
US Billboard Bubbling Under Hot 100 Singles	10
US Billboard Hot Black Singles	61
US Billboard Hot Dance Club Play	1

Chart (1991)	Peak position
US Billboard Hot Dance Club Play	8
US Billboard Hot Dance Music/Maxi-Singles Sales	33

Chart (2001)^{1}	Peak position
Austria (Ö3 Austria Top 40)	42
Germany (GfK)	42

^{1}Pulsedriver vs. George Kranz

=== Year-end charts ===
Chart (1984)	Rank
US Top Dance Singles/Albums	5

== Track listing ==
- 7" single (Pool 6.14033) (1983)
1. "Din Daa Daa (Trommeltanz) (US Mix)" – 3:29
2. "Din Daa Daa (Trommeltanz) (Dub Version)" – 3:11
- 7" single (Ariola 105 993) (1983)
1. "Din Daa Daa (Trommeltanz)" – 3:00
2. "Din Daa Daa (Trommeltanz) (Dub Version)" – 3:08
- 12" single (Pool 6.20268 AE) (1983)
1. "Din Daa Daa (Trommeltanz)" – 4:11
2. "Din Daa Daa (Trommeltanz) (Dub Version)" – 3:08
3. "Din Daa Daa (Trommeltanz) (US Mix)" – 6:20
- Maxi-Single (Zeitgeist 587 348–2) (2001)
1. "Din Daa Daa (Single Version)" – 3:48
2. "Din Daa Daa (Club Edit)" – 3:47
3. "Din Daa Daa (Original 2001 Version)" – 3:46
4. "Din Daa Daa (Extended Mix)" – 7:54
5. "Din Daa Daa (Club Mix)" – 7:04
6. "Din Daa Daa (Jam X & De Leon Remix)" – 6:46
7. "Din Daa Daa (Potatoheads Remix)" – 7:27
8. "Din Daa Daa (Dub Mix)" – 6:54

== Influence ==
Despite its peculiarity, the track remains a dance classic and a European single which has extended the artistic boundaries of modern dance music, along with "Beat Box" by the Art of Noise.

=== Samples and interpolations ===
"Din Daa Daa" has been sampled in several songs since its release, including M|A|R|R|S' "Pump Up the Volume" (1987), Nicolette's "Single Minded People" (1990), and Ying Yang Twins and Pitbull's "Shake" (2005). In 2010, Flo Rida used elements of "Din Daa Daa" in his song "Turn Around (5, 4, 3, 2, 1)".

=== Cover versions and other uses ===
- "Din Daa Daa" was featured on the soundtrack to the 1984 film Breakin' 2: Electric Boogaloo.
- In 1997, Kevin Aviance remade the song. It became his first of three number-one dance hits on the Dance chart and peaked at number 22 on the Hot Dance Music/Maxi-Singles Sales chart and at number 65 on the UK singles chart.
- In 2004, The Roots covered the song as a hidden bonus track on their album The Tipping Point.
- In 2012, the song was used during synchronized swimming competitions at the Summer Olympics in London by Canadian swimmers duet Marie-Pier Boudreau Gagnon and Élise Marcotte.
- In 2017, retailer Kmart used the song in several of its television commercials.

== See also ==
- List of number-one dance singles of 1984 (U.S.)
- List of number-one dance singles of 1997 (U.S.)
