= Beast (V.I.C. album) =

Studio album by V.I.C.
- Released: September 30, 2008
- Recorded: 2007–08
- Studios: ColliPark Studio (Atlanta); Bionic Studios (Milwaukee)
- Genre: Hip hop
- Length: 64:57
- Labels: Warner Bros.; Reprise; ColliPark Productions
- Producers: Mr. Collipark; Soulja Boy; the Package Store

Singles from Beast
- 1. "Get Silly" Released: February 14, 2008; 2. "Wobble" Released: July 15, 2008

Professional ratings
Review scores
Source	Rating
AllMusic	2.5/5 stars
HipHopDX	2/5
RapReviews	5/10

Beast is the only studio album by American rapper V.I.C. It was released on September 30, 2008, through ColliPark Music, Young Mogul Entertainment, Warner Bros. Records and Reprise Records. Recording sessions took place at ColliPark Studio in Atlanta and at Bionic Studios in Milwaukee. Production was handled by Mr. Collipark, the Package Store and Soulja Boy. It features guest appearances from Bun B, E-40, Hurricane Chris, Jermaine Dupri, Polow da Don, Soulja Boy and Unk. The album peaked at number 73 on the Billboard 200, number 12 on the Top R&B/Hip-Hop Albums chart, and number 7 on the Top Rap Albums chart. It was supported by two singles: "Get Silly" and "Wobble", both went charted on Billboard Hot 100 at numbers 29 and 94, respectively.

== Track listing ==
No.	Title	Writer(s)	Producer(s)	Length
1.	"Beast"	Victor Owusu; Jonathan Dumas	Swole	3:49
2.	"Bop Skit"	Corey Dennard; Jonathan Wright; Dumas	The Package Store	0:41
3.	"Bop, Bop, Bop"	Owusu; Earl Williams	Phunk Dawg	4:01
4.	"We Ridin' (Batman)" (featuring Hurricane Chris)	Owusu; Christopher Dooley; Neal Hefti	Yogi; V.I.C. (co.)	3:37
5.	"Flawless"	Owusu; Michael Crooms; Dumas; Avant	Mr. Collipark; Swole	3:29
6.	"Get Silly"	Owusu; DeAndre Way; Derrick Crooms; Wright; Dumas; M. Crooms	Soulja Boy; The Package Store	3:48
7.	"Jaw Jackin"	Victor Walker; Dennard; Bernard Freeman	Mr. Hanky	4:17
8.	"Beat That"	Owusu; Wright; Dennard	John Boy; Mr. Hanky	4:05
9.	"Wobble Skit"	Wright; Dumas	The Package Store	0:26
10.	"Wobble"	Owusu; M. Crooms; Wright; Pjarro Scott; Frank Ski	Mr. Collipark	5:21
11.	"Blow My Mind"	Walker; Dennard	Mr. Hanky	4:09
12.	"Do You Know"	Owusu; Dumas	Swole	4:11
13.	"By Faith"	Owusu; Dumas	Swole	3:18
14.	"Can I Get Her"	Owusu; Wright; Scott	John Boy; Pjarro Scott	3:29
15.	"Duck Off Skit"	Wright; Dumas	The Package Store	0:29
16.	"Duck Off"	Owusu; Wright; Scott	John Boy; Pjarro Scott	4:04
17.	"Wifey Type"	Owusu; Canton Jones	Canton Jones	4:10
18.	"I'm the Shit"	Owusu; Dumas	Swole	3:28
19.	"Get Silly (Mr. Collipark Remix)" (featuring E-40, Jermaine Dupri, Bun B, Polow da Don, Soulja Boy and Unk)	Owusu; Way; D. Crooms; M. Crooms; Wright; Dumas	Soulja Boy; The Package Store	4:13
Total length:				1:04:57

== Charts ==
Chart (2008)	Peak position
US Billboard 200	73
US Top R&B/Hip-Hop Albums (Billboard)	12
US Top Rap Albums (Billboard)	7
