= Badd =

Single by Ying Yang Twins featuring Mike Jones and Mr. Collipark

from the album U.S.A. (United State of Atlanta)
- Released: July 26, 2005
- Recorded: 2005
- Genre: Hip hop; crunk
- Length: 3:48
- Label: TVT Records
- Songwriters: Michael Crooms, Deongelo Holmes, Eric Jackson, Michael A Jones
- Producer: Mr. Collipark

Ying Yang Twins singles chronology
"Wait (The Whisper Song)" (2005)	"Badd" (2005)	"Shake" (2005)

Mike Jones singles chronology
"Flossin'" (2005)	"Badd" (2005)	"Mr. Jones" (2006)

"Badd" is a song by American crunk duo Ying Yang Twins featuring American rapper Mike Jones and American hip-hop producer Mr. Collipark, It was released on July 26, 2005, as the second single from their fourth studio album, U.S.A. (United State of Atlanta) (2005). In 2006, it reached number 6 on the Hot Rap Songs chart and number 29 on the Billboard Hot 100. The song was produced by Mr. Collipark. The music video is set inside various casinos and hotels in Las Vegas.

The song was covered in 2006 by Richard Cheese and Lounge Against the Machine for the album The Sunny Side of the Moon: The Best of Richard Cheese.

== Charts ==
=== Weekly charts ===
Chart (2005–06)	Peak position
US Billboard Hot 100	29
US Hot R&B/Hip-Hop Songs (Billboard)	16
US Hot Rap Songs (Billboard)	6
US Rhythmic Airplay (Billboard)	3

=== Year-end charts ===
Chart (2005)	Position
US Hot R&B/Hip-Hop Songs (Billboard)	85
US Rhythmic (Billboard)	23
