= Salt Shaker (song) =

2003 single by Ying Yang Twins

Single by Ying Yang Twins featuring Lil Jon & the East Side Boyz

from the album Me & My Brother
- Released: 2003
- Recorded: 2003
- Genre: Dirty rap; crunk
- Length: 4:00
- Label: TVT
- Songwriters: Deongelo Holmes; Eric Jackson; Jonathan Smith; Michael Jones; Craig Love
- Producer: Lil Jon

Ying Yang Twins singles chronology
| "Naggin'" (2003) | "Salt Shaker" (2003) | "What's Happenin!" (2004) |

Lil Jon singles chronology
| "Shake That Monkey" (2003) | "Salt Shaker" (2003) | "Come Get Some" (2003) |

"Salt Shaker" is a song by American hip-hop group Ying Yang Twins featuring Lil Jon & the East Side Boyz. It was released on their third studio album, Me & My Brother (2003). It was produced by Lil Jon with guitars played by Craig Love. The song reached the top 10 in the United States, peaking at number 9.

In the United States, "Salt Shaker" became the biggest hit of the Ying Yang Twins' career, debuting in the top 10 at number 9 on February 14, 2004, and staying there for two weeks. In Australia, the song was released as a double A-side CD single with "Naggin'".

The official remix featured Lil Jon & the East Side Boyz, Murphy Lee, Fat Joe and Juvenile. There is an official extended 2004 remix of the above artists and additional verses by Fatman Scoop, Jacki-O, B.G., and Pitbull. There is also a remix on DJ Drama's Gangsta Grillz X with Big Boi and Snoop Dogg. Later, it was re-played in 2020 on 98-PXYz.

== Charts ==
=== Weekly charts ===
Weekly chart performance for "Salt Shaker"
| Chart (2003–2004) | Peak position |
|---|---|
| Australia (ARIA) with "Naggin'" | 75 |
| Australia Urban (ARIA) | 16 |
| Germany (GfK) | 87 |
| US Billboard Hot 100 | 9 |
| US Hot R&B/Hip-Hop Songs (Billboard) | 9 |
| US Hot Rap Songs (Billboard) | 2 |
| US Pop Airplay (Billboard) | 38 |
| US Rhythmic Airplay (Billboard) | 3 |

=== Year-end charts ===
Year-end chart performance for "Salt Shaker"
| Chart (2004) | Position |
|---|---|
| US Billboard Hot 100 | 49 |
| US Hot R&B/Hip-Hop Songs (Billboard) | 27 |
| US Hot Rap Songs (Billboard) | 12 |
| US Rhythmic (Billboard) | 14 |
