= Chemically Imbalanced (Ying Yang Twins album) =

Studio album by Ying Yang Twins
- Released: November 28, 2006
- Recorded: 2005–06
- Genre: Southern hip hop; crunk
- Length: 60:05
- Label: TVT
- Producer: Brian "B" Tealer; Jerry Duplessis; Jonathan "John Boy" Wright; Mr. Collipark; Wyclef Jean

Ying Yang Twins chronology
| U.S.A. Still United (2005) | Chemically Imbalanced (2006) | The Official Work (2008) |

Singles from Chemically Imbalanced
- 1. "Dangerous" Released: October 14, 2006; 2. "1st Booty on Duty" Released: 2006; 3. "Jigglin'" Released: 2006

Professional ratings
Review scores
| Source | Rating |
|---|---|
| AllHipHop | 2.5/5 |
| AllMusic | 3/5 stars |
| laut.de | 4/5 stars |
| musicOMH | 1/5 stars |
| Now | 2/5 |
| PopMatters | 7/10 |
| RapReviews | 5/10 |
| Rolling Stone | 3/5 stars |

Chemically Imbalanced is the fifth studio album by American hip hop duo Ying Yang Twins. It was released on November 28, 2006, through TVT Records. Production was handled by Mr. Collipark, Jerry Duplessis, Wyclef Jean, Brian "B" Tealer and Jonathan "John Boy" Wright. It features guest appearances from Huggy, K.T., Los Vegaz, Taurus and Wyclef Jean. The album debuted at number 40 on the US Billboard 200 with 36,000 copies sold. Its lead single, "Dangerous", made it to number 85 on the US Billboard Hot 100.

== Track listing ==
| No. | Title | Writer(s) | Producer(s) | Length |
|---|---|---|---|---|
| 1. | "Intro" | | | 1:04 |
| 2. | "Keep on Coming" | Michael Crooms; Deongelo Holmes; Eric Jackson | Mr. Collipark | 3:59 |
| 3. | "1st Booty on Duty" | Crooms; Holmes; Jackson | Mr. Collipark | 3:19 |
| 4. | "Jack It Up" (featuring Taurus) | Crooms; Holmes; Jackson; Carlos Thorton | Mr. Collipark | 3:53 |
| 5. | "Jigglin" | Crooms; Holmes; Jackson | Mr. Collipark | 3:24 |
| 6. | "Take It Slow" (featuring Los Vegaz) | Crooms; Holmes; Jackson; Thorton | Mr. Collipark | 4:19 |
| 7. | "Patron Skit" | | | 0:27 |
| 8. | "Big Boy Liquor" (featuring Huggy and K.T.) | Holmes; Jackson; Kerry "K.T." Taylor; Johnathan "John Boy" Wright | Jonathan "John Boy" Wright; Kaine (co.) | 4:31 |
| 9. | "Smoke Break Skit" | | | 0:20 |
| 10. | "Collard Greens" | Brian Tealer; Holmes; Jackson | Brian "B" Tealer | 5:01 |
| 11. | "Water" | Wyclef Jean; Jerry Duplessis; Crooms; Holmes; Jackson; Jerry Lordan | Wyclef Jean; Jerry "Wonda" Duplessis; Mr. Collipark; Keith "Lil Wonda" Duplessis (add.) | 3:58 |
| 12. | "Dangerous" (featuring Wyclef Jean) | Jean; J. Duplessis; Crooms; Jackson; Holmes; Daryl Hall; John Oates; Sara Allen; Huddie Ledbetter | Wyclef Jean; Jerry "Wonda" Duplessis; Mr. Collipark; Keith "Lil Wonda" Duplessis (add.) | 4:20 |
| 13. | "Family" | Jean; J. Duplessis; Croom; Jackson; Holmes | Wyclef Jean; Jerry "Wonda" Duplessis; Mr. Collipark; Keith "Lil Wonda" Duplessis (add.) | 4:23 |
| 14. | "Friday" | Jean; J. Duplessis; Crooms; Jackson; Holmes | Wyclef Jean; Jerry "Wonda" Duplessis; Mr. Collipark; Keith "Lil Wonda" Duplessis (add.) | 5:25 |
| 15. | "Leave" | Jean; J. Duplessis; Crooms; Jackson; Holmes | Wyclef Jean; Jerry "Wonda" Duplessis; Mr. Collipark | 3:20 |
| 16. | "One Mo for the Road Skit" | | | 1:37 |
| 17. | "Open" | Crooms; Holmes; Jackson; Maurice Cenac | Mr. Collipark | 3:34 |
| 18. | "In This Thang Still" | Crooms; Holmes; Jackson | Mr. Collipark | 3:11 |
| Total length: | | | | 60:05 |

Sample credits

- "Water" contains an interpolation of "Apache", written by Jerry Lordan.
- "Dangerous" contains elements of "Maneater", written by Daryl Hall, John Oates, and Sara Allen. It also contains a sample of "Black Betty", written by Huddie Ledbetter, performed by Ram Jam.
- "Open" contains an interpolation of "Jam on Revenge", written by Maurice Cenac.

== Charts ==
| Chart (2006) | Peak position |
|---|---|
| US Billboard 200 | 40 |
| US Top R&B/Hip-Hop Albums (Billboard) | 8 |
| US Top Rap Albums (Billboard) | 6 |
| US Independent Albums (Billboard) | 1 |
