= Whistle While You Twurk =

2000 single by Ying Yang Twins

Single by Ying Yang Twins

from the album Thug Walkin'
- B-side: "Brang Yo Azz OutDoz"
- Released: March 12, 2000
- Genre: Dirty rap, hip hop, crunk
- Length: 4:25
- Label: Collipark
- Songwriters: Eric Jackson, Deongelo Holmes, Michael Crooms
- Producers: Mr. Collipark, Keith "K-Luv" Chapman

Ying Yang Twins singles chronology
"Whistle While You Twurk" (2000)	"Ying Yang in This Thang" (2000)

"Whistle While You Twurk" is the debut single by American hip hop group Ying Yang Twins. It was released on March 12, 2000 as the lead single from their debut studio album Thug Walkin' (2000). Produced by Mr. Collipark, the song contains an interpolation of the song "Whistle While You Work" from the 1937 film Snow White and the Seven Dwarfs.

The song was a hit in the early 2000s and was played on urban and pop radio stations. Most notably, it also popularized the dance of twerking.

== Charts ==
Chart (2000)	Peak position
US Billboard Hot 100	74
US Hot R&B/Hip-Hop Songs (Billboard)	16
US Hot Rap Songs (Billboard)	1
