= V.I.C. =

International rapper

- Born: Victor Grimmy Owusu; July 20, 1987 (age 39); New York City, New York, U.S.
- Origin: College Park, Georgia, U.S.
- Genre: Southern hip-hop
- Occupation: Rapper
- Years active: 2008–2015
- Label: Warner

Victor Grimmy Owusu (born July 20, 1987), better known by his stage name V.I.C., is a retired American rapper. He is best known for his 2008 singles "Get Silly" and "Wobble"; the former peaked at number 29 on the Billboard Hot 100, while the latter received quadruple platinum certification by the Recording Industry Association of America (RIAA).

== Early life ==
V.I.C. was born Victor Grimmy Owusu in 1987 in Corona, Queens to a mother from New York City and a father from Ghana. At ten, he wrote his first song, a drug awareness rap for his elementary school. Later that year, he moved with his family to College Park, GA. After graduating from high school, he worked as a freelance barber while pursuing a music career.

== Music career ==
His first and only album Beast (2008) charted at number 73 on the Billboard 200. He recorded a couple of songs for a second album Revenge of the Beast that was never completed.

He released a single called "Twerk It" in 2012 and another called "Snapchat (Pose For The Camera)" in 2015. Later that same year, V.I.C. attempted a comeback with a song called "Murder She Wrote" under the stage name "Genius." As of 2026, it remains the only release under his alternate moniker.

== Discography ==
=== Albums ===
List of albums, with selected chart positions
Title	Album details	Peak chart positions		
Title	Album details	US	US R&B	US Rap
Beast	Released: August 26, 2008; Label: Warner Bros. Records, ColliPark Music, Young Mogul Entertainment; Format: CD, LP, digital download	73	12	7

=== Mixtapes ===
- 2009: DJ J1 Present V.I.C. in HD
- 2009: DJ Jay Rock Presents V.I.C. Lord Ova Beats
- 2010: DJ Grady Presents V.I.C. Swagg Thru da Roof
- 2012: Big H & Tommy Boy Entertainment Presents V.I.C. Lord Ova Beats (hosted by DJ Grady, DJ J1 & DJ Iceberg)

=== Singles ===
List of singles, with selected chart positions and certifications, showing year released and album name
Title	Year	Peak chart positions			Certifications	Album
Title	Year	US	US R&B	US Rap	Certifications	Album
"Get Silly"	2008	29	13	5	RIAA: Gold	Beast
"Wobble"	2008	94	77	-	RIAA: 4× Platinum	Beast
"Say Bow" (feat. J-Futuristic)	2009	-	87	-		Non-album singles
"Twerk It"	2012	-	70	-		Non-album singles
"Snapchat (Pose for the Camera)"	2015	-	-	-		Non-album singles
"—" denotes a recording that did not chart.
