= Elephant Man (musician) =

Jamaican dancehall musician (born 1975)

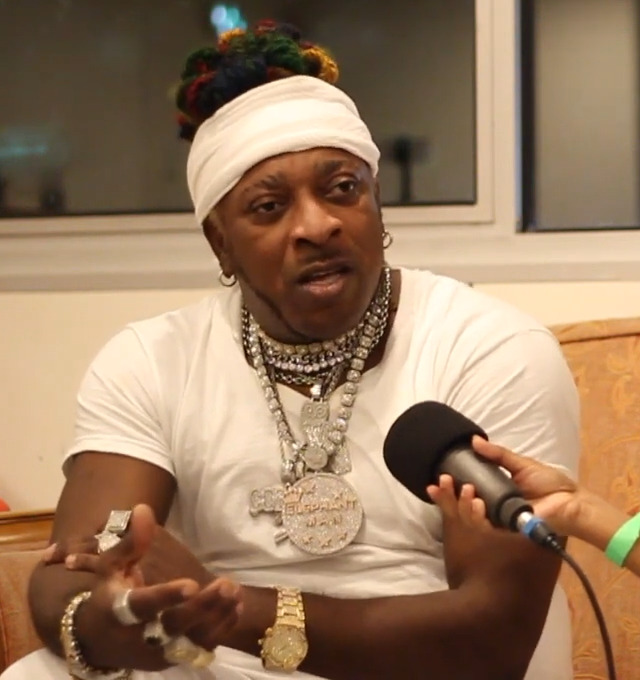
- Elephant Man in 2022

Background information
- Born: O'Neil Norman Bryan; 11 September 1975 (age 50); Seaview Gardens, Kingston, Jamaica
- Genres: Dancehall; reggae fusion
- Occupations: Deejay; singer
- Years active: 1995–present
- Labels: Bad Boy; Atlantic; VP; Greensleeves
- Member of: The Alliance
- Formerly of: Scare Dem Crew

O'Neil Norman Bryan (born 11 September 1975), better known by his stage name Elephant Man, is a Jamaican dancehall musician, having formerly been a member of the dancehall group Scare Dem Crew prior to his solo career.

== Family and relationships ==
Elephant Man is a father to at least 38 children. His first biological child was born when he was 17 years old. In a February 2012 interview with Winford Williams of OnStage, he claimed to have had 20 different baby mothers at the time. Other children such as Ashanti Bryan aka Jeniun (formerly Ele-Trunk), claims Elephant Man disowned him and others - which possibly put the number of children O'Neil Bryan has to over 40.

== Career ==
His song "Willie Bounce" appeared on several mixtapes in early 2006. It used the first few bars from "I Will Survive" by Gloria Gaynor. "Willie Bounce" has been described as one of Elephant Man's most recognisable songs, with the corresponding dance still enjoying popularity as of 2015.

Bryan signed with New York-based label Bad Boy Records and released Let's Get Physical on 6 November 2007. The first single was called "Five-O" and featured Wyclef Jean. Another track on the album featured Diddy and Busta Rhymes, and it was produced by Cipha Sounds and Solitair.

== Legal issues ==
Bryan has been criticised for his lyrics calling for violence against gay people. In 2003, British LGBT group OutRage! called for the arrest and prosecution of several dancehall stars including Elephant Man, Bounty Killer and Beenie Man for violation of hate crimes statutes. In 2004, he was dropped from the MOBO Awards. Since then pressure from his record company and agreement with gay rights groups to avoid songs with lyrics deemed to incite homophobic violence have allowed him to perform in the UK. In 2009, his scheduled appearance at Toronto's Caribana festival was cancelled for similar reasons. A concert in Munich was cancelled in February 2015 after LGBT rights groups had asked the police to make sure he would not perform songs which call upon people to murder gays.

In January 2012, Bryan was arrested and charged with the rape and grievous sexual assault of a 31-year-old woman who accused him of assaulting her in his home in St. Andrew. In February 2016, the case was dropped due to the death of the complainant.

In March 2020, Jamaican authorities charged Elephant Man after it was alleged that he intentionally failed to declare his travel to Germany in order to avoid being quarantined in efforts to prevent the spread of the COVID-19 pandemic from countries that were on a restricted travel list. Elephant Man later apologised for the incident.

== Discography ==
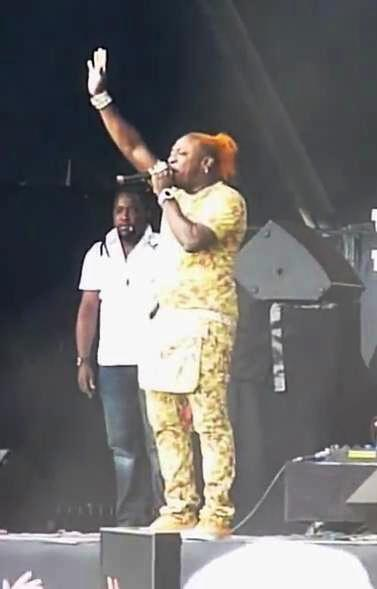
Elephant Man live at Reggae Sundance 2013

=== Albums ===
- 2000: Comin' 4 You
- 2001: Log On
- 2002: Higher Level
- 2003: Good 2 Go
- 2007: Monsters of Dancehall
- 2008: Let's Get Physical
- 2011: Dance & Sweep

== Video game appearances ==
Elephant Man is a playable character in the 2004 video game Def Jam: Fight for NY.
