= George Kranz =

German singer and percussionist

- Born: 15 December 1956 (age 69) (Germany)
- Website: www.george-kranz.de

George Kranz is a German dance music singer and percussionist. He is best known for his song "Trommeltanz", otherwise known as "Din Daa Daa". The song hit No. 1 on the Hot Dance Music/Club Play chart in 1984 and then returned to the chart in a new version in 1991, peaking at No. 8. "Din Daa Daa" (sometimes spelled "Din Da Da") is considered a classic dance music track and has been remixed, sampled and bootlegged many times, including in 1987's seminal "Pump Up the Volume" by MARRS, 1998's Praise Joint Remix by Kirk Franklin, 2005's "Shake" by the Ying Yang Twins, "Turn Around" by Flo Rida an Xbox 360 commercial and a Google Chrome commercial.

== Discography ==
=== Albums ===
- My Rhythm (1983), Pool
- Magic Sticks (OST) (1986), Virgin
- Move It (1989), SPV
- Sticky Druisin (1995)
- Very Best Of (1999), DFP-Music (BMG)

=== Singles ===
- "Trommeltanz" (1983), Pool
- "Bass Drum Ma Bass Drum" (1985), Pool
- "Heya" (1987)
- "Helmut Kohl ist tot" (1992)
- "Din Daa Daa (91 Remix)" (1991), Cardiac
- "Din Daa Daa (96 Remix)" (1996), DiN

=== Producer ===
- The Fog – Metallic Lord (1999), DFP-Music (BMG)
- Bunny Rugs – On Soul (2002), DFP-Music (H`art)

=== Filmography ===
- Breakin' 2: Electric Boogaloo
- Kabine 19
- Die Vier aus der Zwischenzeit (First season)
- Tocata
- An Odd Couple
- Magic Sticks
- The Passenger – Welcome to Germany
- You Are Not Alone: The Roy Black Story
- Happy Birthday (Unschuldig schuldig)

== See also ==
- List of number-one dance hits (United States)
- List of artists who reached number one on the US Dance chart
