= Ying Yang Twins =

American hip hop duo

- The Ying Yang Twins in May 2026

Background information
- Also known as: The Ying Yang Twins
- Origin: Atlanta, Georgia, U.S.
- Genres: Southern hip-hop; crunk
- Years active: 1997–present
- Labels: TVT; Universal; Epic
- Members: Kaine; D-Roc

The Ying Yang Twins are an American hip hop duo consisting of Kaine (born Eric Jackson; December 16, 1978) and D-Roc (born Deongelo Holmes; February 23, 1979). Despite the name, the duo are not twins, brothers, or even related.

They debuted in 2000 and rose to mainstream popularity in 2003 collaborating with Britney Spears on "(I Got That) Boom Boom" from her album In the Zone (2003) and with Lil Jon on "Get Low". In 2004 and 2005, the Ying Yang Twins became more popular with party singles "Salt Shaker", "Wait (The Whisper Song)", "Shake" and "Badd". They have received recognition for their song "Halftime (featuring Homebwoi)" which is played at New Orleans Saints homegames after most touchdowns. In 2008, the hip hop duo released The Official Work mixtape. In 2009, they followed with their sixth studio album, Ying Yang Forever and then released Legendary Status: Ying Yang Twins Greatest Hits three months later. In 2013, the Ying Yang Twins released the Ass in Session and Twurk or Die mixtapes.

== Career ==
D-Roc and Kaine met in East Atlanta at the age of 16. Both grew up with physical disabilities, as D-Roc had an underdeveloped left hand with nubs instead of fingers, and Kaine suffered from cerebral palsy that made him walk with a limp.

The duo recorded their first track, "One on One," for the 1998 DJ Smurf (Mr. Collipark) album Dead Crunk. Their 2000 debut single "Whistle While You Twurk" was played on urban and pop radio stations and peaked at #17 on the Hot R&B/Hip-Hop Songs chart. They toured with Juz tha King, Kat Nu and Demo Dil. Their full-length debut album Thug Walkin' was released that year.

Immediately after discovering fellow Atlanta hip hop artist Lil Jon, A&R Bryan Leach began talks with Mr. Collipark about signing them to TVT Records. Protracted negotiations meant that a deal was not finalized in time for the label to release their next album Alley: The Return of the Ying Yang Twins, which instead appeared in 2002 on Koch Records. The album was successful among hip-hop fans in the Southern United States. The same year, the group appeared on the album Kings of Crunk by Lil Jon on the single "Get Low", and the song was a huge club and radio hit. As Crooms had negotiated only a one-album deal with Koch, the duo was free to finally submit to the advances of TVT, who had impressed them with their recent work with Lil Jon & the East Side Boyz.

Me & My Brother, their first album for TVT, was certified platinum on April 12, 2005, and yielded three more hits — "What's Happenin!", "Naggin'" and the Lil Jon collaboration "Salt Shaker". The same year the duo appeared on Britney Spears' album In the Zone on the song "I Got That (Boom Boom)" and her television special of the same name. In 2004, TVT released My Brother & Me, an album composed largely of remixes which featured a bonus DVD of the group's videos.

A new album U.S.A. (United State of Atlanta) appeared in Summer 2005 as its singles "Wait (The Whisper Song)", "Badd", and "Shake" were dominating popular music and rap radio stations, and U.S.A. Still United, a collection of outtakes, remixes, and collaborations similar to My Brother & Me followed in December 2005. It, too, was accompanied by a DVD featuring music videos and other footage from the U.S. (United State of Atlanta) period.

In 2005, D-Roc and his younger brothers, Mr. Ball, and Da Birthday Boy, formed the group Da Muzicianz and released their first single "Camera Phone". Their self-titled album was released on February 28, 2006.

The group's fifth album Chemically Imbalanced was released in November 2006. For this album, the Twins collaborated with producers Wyclef Jean and Keith Duplessis in addition to Mr. Collipark, who produced a majority of the songs on the group's previous album. The first two singles were the Hall & Oates-sampling "Dangerous", featuring Wyclef Jean, and "Jigglin'". In 2008, the Twins released the mixtape The Official Work and a promo single titled "Drop". A highlight of the Ying Yang Twins' tour includes a visit to the Epsilon Mu chapter of Sigma Chi. Here they performed all their hits live in front of a sold out Texas crowd. All of the proceeds from the show went to charity. In 2009, the Twins released their latest album with Deep Records, Ying Yang Forever, and started a tour titled "Ying Yang Forever Tour".

Their song "Halftime (Stand Up and Get Crunk)" is now a standard in many National Football League football stadiums, and it is considered to be the unofficial anthem of the New Orleans Saints during their Super Bowl victory season, but it has been a staple at Saints games since 2006. This song was performed live during the victory parade. The song has also been used in NFL Street 2 and Madden NFL 11 as well as the opening tip at home games for the National Basketball Association's San Antonio Spurs throughout the majority of the 2000s.

On November 3, 2009, Ying Yang Twins released their greatest hits album via The Orchard and BOOTY Records. The album includes "What's Happenin!", "Shake", "Salt Shaker", and "Wait (The Whisper Song)" plus three new tracks.

On June 29, 2012, Ying Yang Twins revealed on Twitter that they had signed to Epic Records and released their first single from their untitled album "Fist Pump, Jump Jump", featuring singer Greg Tecoz.

The Ying Yang Twins were a featured act on the 2019 Millenium Tour, with B2K, Chingy and others.

Their Christmas song "Deck Da' Club" featured heavily in the 2019 Christmas show of The Unbelievers Podcast.

== Discography ==
=== Studio albums ===
- Thug Walkin' (2000)
- Alley: The Return of the Ying Yang Twins (2002)
- Me & My Brother (2003)
- U.S.A. (United State of Atlanta) (2005)
- Chemically Imbalanced (2006)
- Ying Yang Forever (2009)
- All Around the World (with DJ Teddy-O) (2012)

==== As featured artist ====
List of singles as featured artist
| Title | Year | Album |
|---|---|---|
| "Get Low" (Lil Jon & the East Side Boyz featuring Ying Yang Twins) | 2003 | Kings of Crunk |
| "My Pinky" (Natalac featuring Ying Yang Twins and Drumlordz Shawty) | 2018 | Pimp of the Nation |

== Filmography ==
- Soul Plane (2004)
