= Mr. Collipark =

American record producer from Georgia

- Also known as: DJ Smurf
- Born: Michael Antoine Crooms; October 5, 1970 (age 56); College Park, Georgia, U.S.
- Genre: Hip-hop
- Occupations: Record producer; songwriter; disc jockey
- Years active: 1992–present
- Labels: Interscope; ColliPark Productions; Ichiban; Fortune Entertainment

Michael Antoine Crooms (born October 5, 1970), better known by his stage name Mr. Collipark, is an American hip-hop producer and the president of his own Atlanta-based record label, ColliPark Music, which was founded in 1999.

The name Collipark was derived from the city of College Park, Georgia. Crooms is credited as playing a major role in the career of the Ying Yang Twins, Soulja Boy, Yung Berg, Taurus, Hurricane Chris, V.I.C., and Vistoso Bosses.

In 2005, Mr. Collipark was featured on Bubba Sparxxx's single "Ms. New Booty", which peaked at number seven on the Billboard Hot 100. In 2007, Mr. Collipark won BMI's "Songwriter of the Year" award. He was also nominated for a 2008 Grammy for his work with Soulja Boy.

In 2011, Mr. Collipark debuted his mixtape Can I Have the Club Back Please, which features tracks from artists including Translee, Treal Lee & Prince Rick, and the Ying Yang Twins.

== ColliPark Music ==
ColliPark Music
- Founded: 1999
- Founder: Michael "Mr. Collipark" Crooms (CEO)
- Status: Active
- Genre: Hip-hop
- Country of origin: United States
- Location: Atlanta, Georgia (2000-present)

Crooms founded the record label ColliPark Music in 1999. He signed various artists to the label including Soulja Boy, Ying Yang Twins and Vistoso Bosses.

=== Notable artists ===
- Ying Yang Twins
- I-15
- Soulja Boy
- V.I.C.
- Vistoso Bosses

=== Albums released on label ===
Albums released on Collipark Music label
Artist	Album details	Peak chart positions						Certifications
Artist	Album details	US	US R&B	US Rap	FRA	NZ	UK	Certifications
Ying Yang Twins	Title: Thug Walkin'; Released: April 25, 2000 (U.S.); Singles: "Whistle While You Twurk", "Ying Yang in This Thang"	—	54	68	—	—	—	
Soulja Boy Tell 'Em	Title: Souljaboytellem.com; Released: October 2, 2007; Singles: "Crank That (Soulja Boy)", "Soulja Girl", "Yahhh!", "Donk"	4	4	1	132	9	195	
V.I.C.	Title: Beast; Released: August 26, 2008; Singles: "Get Silly", "Wobble"	73	12	7	—	—	—	
Soulja Boy Tell 'Em	Title: iSouljaBoyTellem; Released: December 16, 2008; Singles: "Bird Walk", "Kiss Me Thru the Phone", "Turn My Swag On"	43	8	2	—	—	134	RIAA: Gold

== The Package Store and record producing ==
Mr. Collipark, along with his production/writing team the Package Store, have produced and written artists including Kilo Ali, Hurricane Chris, Mike Jones, Lil Jon, Jermaine Dupri, Soulja Boy, DJ Unk, E-40 and Bubba Sparxxx.

== Discography ==
=== Studio albums ===
- 1994: Versastyles
- 1998: Dead Crunk

=== Mixtapes ===
- 2011: Can I Have the Club Back Please
