= Feel This Moment =

2013 single by Pitbull ft. Christina Aguilera

Single by Pitbull featuring Christina Aguilera

from the album Global Warming
- Released: February 22, 2013
- Recorded: 2012
- Studio: Al Burna (Tokyo, Japan); The Red Lips Room (Beverly Hills, CA); The Ox (North Hollywood, CA); Le Vose (North Hollywood, CA)
- Genre: Dance-pop
- Length: 3:49 (album version); 3:19 (radio edit)
- Label: Mr. 305; Polo Grounds; RCA
- Songwriters: Armando C. Pérez; Chantal Kreviazuk; Nasri Atweh; Adam Messinger; Nolan Lambroza; Urales Vargas; Christina Aguilera; Pål Waaktaar; Morten Harket; Magne Furuholmen
- Producers: Adam Messinger; Nasri Atweh; Sir Nolan; DJ Buddha

Pitbull singles chronology
"Don't Stop the Party" (2012)	"Feel This Moment" (2013)	"Sexy People (The Fiat Song)" (2013)

Christina Aguilera singles chronology
"Just a Fool" (2012)	"Feel This Moment" (2013)	"Hoy Tengo Ganas de Ti" (2013)

Music video
- "Feel This Moment" on YouTube

"Feel This Moment" is a song by American rapper Pitbull featuring American singer Christina Aguilera. The song was released on February 22, 2013, by Mr. 305, Polo Grounds Music and RCA Records, as the fourth and final single from the album Global Warming, which was released in 2012. "Feel This Moment" was written by the artists alongside Chantal Kreviazuk and producers Nasri Atweh, Adam Messinger, Sir Nolan, and DJ Buddha. The song interpolates "Take On Me" by a-ha, written and composed by Morten Harket, Paul Waaktaar-Savoy, and Magne Furuholmen.

"Feel This Moment" received generally favorable reviews from music critics, who praised Aguilera's appearance and the "Take On Me" interpolation used on the song alongside Aguilera writing the chorus herself. "Feel This Moment" was a commercial success, peaking at number eight on the US Billboard Hot 100 and was certified quadruple platinum in October 2020. Outside of the United States, "Feel This Moment" peaked at number one in Bulgaria, Chile, The Czech Republic, and Spain, and within the top ten of the charts in twenty-two additional countries. It garnered multiple certifications in many regions, including by the Australian Recording Industry Association and the British Phonographic Industry.

An accompanying music video for "Feel This Moment" was directed by David Rousseau and was released on March 15, 2013. The video was shot in a black and white scene, featuring several shots from Pitbull's Planet Pit World Tour and Aguilera with big curly hair. The clip garnered positive feedback, who praised Aguilera's new figure in it. At the 2013 MTV Video Music Awards, the video was nominated for Best Collaboration. The duo performed "Feel This Moment" on a number of occasions, including at the 2012 American Music Awards, 2013 Kids' Choice Awards, and the 2013 Billboard Music Awards; in this last, Harket was featured as a guest star.

== Background ==
On October 16, 2012, Pitbull's official website gave a list of possible collaborators who were expected to appear on the album, with Christina Aguilera being one of them. A 1-minute, 37-second snippet of the track, leaked online on October 23, 2012, while the full track leaked on November 13, 2012. Pitbull spoke about the collaboration with Aguilera in an interview, stating:

"'Feel This Moment' is a special record, and to work with Christina Aguilera is an honor, a blessing, someone that I highly respected, as far as her talent, her voice, her range that she can take it, and I think 'Feel This Moment' is gonna be a great record, because it's got a very powerful sample and everybody's gonna dance too. On top of that, when I say 'Feel this Moment' is basically, 'feel life, don't live life for a moment, live life for life, that is your moment.'"

== Composition ==
"Feel This Moment" (2013)
A 22-second sample of "Feel This Moment," with Aguilera singing vocals in the chorus. It was released as the fourth single from Global Warming.

"Feel This Moment" was written by Nasri Atweh, Chantal Kreviazuk, Adam Messinger, Sir Nolan, DJ Buddha, Pitbull and Aguilera, while production was handled by Adam Messinger, Nasri Atweh, Sir Nolan and DJ Buddha. It interpolates the hook from Norwegian synthpop band a-ha's 1985 hit "Take On Me," and the band members themselves (Morten Harket, Paul Waaktaar-Savoy, and Magne Furuholmen), who wrote "Take On Me," received writing credits for "Feel This Moment."

The song is a dance-pop song about stopping to take a moment to appreciate life. Set to a thumping club beat, the rapper spits, "Let's stop time and enjoy this moment," followed by Aguilera belting, "One day when my light is glowing, I'll be in my castle golden; But until the gates are open, I just wanna feel this moment." Pitbull makes reference to E.L. James's best-selling erotic novel, 50 Shades of Grey, when he raps, "She read books, especially about red rooms and tie-ups." According to Jason Lipshut of Billboard, "Feel This Moment" is structured much like Pitbull's "Get It Started," which in turn featured Shakira. With the chord progression of Am—D—G—C—G/B, the song is written in the key of G major. According to the sheet music at musicnotes.com, the song is written in common time with a tempo of 136 beats per minute.

== Critical reception ==
"Feel This Moment" received generally positive reviews from music critics. David Jeffries of AllMusic picked the song as one of the album's standout tracks, calling it a "glorious disco explosion." Entertainment Weekly's journalist Ray Rahman thought that "Feel This Moment" was "the best song on the album," writing that "it whisks a 'Take On Me' sample to places it's never been before." Sarah Godfrey of The Washington Post agreed, recommending the track, as one of the three best tracks on the album. Mikael Wood of Los Angeles Times wrote that "it turns A-ha's '80s synth-pop curio 'Take On Me' into the stuff of a Las Vegas bachelorette bash." Jeremy Thomas of 411 Mania praised Aguilera's appearance, writing that she "adds some musical substance to Pitbull's style and makes for a track that, if not necessarily good, at least is very listenable."

Sam Lanksy of Idolator called it a "doozy," praising Aguilera's part, calling it a "memorable chorus," adding that the song "fares better than her yowling on Chris Mann's cover of 'The Blower's Daughter.'" Jason Lipshut of Billboard also praised her vocals, calling it "gorgeous pipes." Rick Florino of Artistdirect also praised her part, writing that "Aguilera delivers a shimmering refrain as Pitbull's flow drives the verses smoothly." Nicolle Weeks of 4Music also enjoyed, writing: "This is actually quite a catchy tune to dance to and it boasts a sick hook. It doesn't feature any misogyny, which is nice."

Julianne Escobedo Shepherd of Spin wrote a mixed review, stating that "the Christina Aguilera collab should be a major crossover situation — she chips in a slightly cheesy, Selena-alluding diva vocal combined with Miami-worthy sub-bass, but a-ha's 'Take On Me' hook played on a handsy techno synth overrides both vocalists." But an editorial writer from Popjustice was negative towards both "Feel This Moment" and will.i.am's song "Scream & Shout" (2012), stating that what the "two songs represent is pop music writhing around in its own shit."

== Chart performance ==
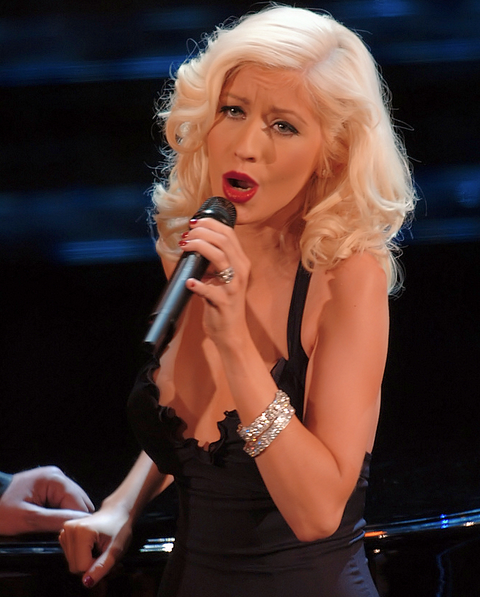
The song marked Christina Aguilera's tenth top-ten hit on the Hot 100

"Feel This Moment" made its first chart appearance on December 15, 2012, debuting at number 169 on the French Singles Chart. The following week, the song did a climb to number 63. In its third week charting, the single jumped to number 35, becoming Pitbull's 13th top-40 single on the chart and Aguilera's 16th. The song kept fluctuating on the chart for the next two weeks, until it climbed to number 26 on January 19, 2013. In its seventh week, the song peaked at number 23. In Austria, "Feel This Moment" debuted at number 29 on the Austrian Singles Chart on November 30, 2012. Later, the single climbed to number 27 and remained two further weeks before dropping out of the chart. On January 25, 2013, the song re-entered at number 11, while in its sixth week, it jumped to number seven, becoming Pitbull's 13th and Aguilera's tenth top-ten single. On March 15, 2013, the song peaked at number two on the chart.

In Switzerland, "Feel This Moment" debuted at number 40 on the Swiss Singles Chart on December 2, 2012. It peaked at number seven on April 21, 2013, and stayed there for two weeks. On the Swedish Singles Chart, the song gained moderate success, peaking at number 22 on the chart. Despite that, the single was certified platinum by the Swedish Recording Industry Association. In Germany, the song peaked at number nine on March 25, 2013, on the German Singles Chart. Thanks to the chart success, it was certified platinum by the Bundesverband Musikindustrie. In Norway, "Feel This Moment" debuted at number 17 on the Norwegian Singles Chart on January 26, 2013. In its eighth week on chart, the song peaked at number six. In the United Kingdom, the single peaked at number five on the UK Singles Chart, becoming Pitbull's tenth top-ten hit in the country and Aguilera's 17th. It was also a success on the dance market in the country, peaking at number one on the UK Dance Chart. "Feel This Moment" was a commercial success throughout Europe, peaking at number five on the Euro Digital Songs chart.

In Australia, "Feel This Moment" debuted at number 12 on the Australian Singles Chart on March 13, 2013. On March 17, 2013, the song peaked at number six and stayed there for two weeks, becoming Pitbull's tenth top-ten hit in Australia and Aguilera's 17th. Due to the chart success, the single was certified platinum by the Australian Recording Industry Association (ARIA) thanks to the digital sales of 70,000 copies. On the New Zealand Singles Chart, the song debuted at number 17 on February 25, 2013. On April 8, 2013, it peaked at number 12 and remained for 3 weeks.

Before release as an official single, "Feel This Moment" debuted on the Billboard Bubbling Under Hot 100 at number 24 due to strong airplay and streaming. After several weeks, the song peaked at number eight on the US Billboard Hot 100. The single marks Pitbull's eighth US top ten hit and Aguilera's tenth. It also peaked at number four on the Canadian Singles Chart, becoming Pitbull's and Aguilera's thirteenth top ten single on the chart. As of July 2013, the song has sold over two million copies in the US. On October 16, 2020, the single was certified quadruple platinum by the Recording Industry Association of America (RIAA) for combined sales and streaming equivalent units of over four million units in the United States.

== Use in media ==
Since its release, "Feel This Moment" has been used several times throughout various media. It was used in the promos for Australian reality show So You Think You Can Dance Australia, for Chilean reality show Salta si puedes. It was also used in the first trailer for The LEGO Movie which was released on February 7, 2014, a couple of scenes in the 2017 animated movie, The Emoji Movie and was used in trailers for Go Jetters on CBeebies in 2020. The song is also featured in the rhythm game Just Dance 2014 and was featured as the fourth main track on Now That's What I Call Music 46 in the United States.

The song was used for the opening number of Miss Universe 2020.

== Music video ==
The music video was first released onto Pitbull's official VEVO channel on March 15, 2013. It was directed by David Rousseau. It was shot in black and white scene. The video is centered on the rapper's 2012 Planet Pit World Tour. In the video, the tour hit several big cities including Paris, Rio de Janeiro, New York, Los Angeles and Miami. Aguilera is also featured in the video, with big curly hair and black outfit. The video has received over 806 million views on YouTube, making it 5x Vevo certified.

The video for "Feel This Moment" received mainly positive reviews. Rap-Up wrote, "Mr. Worldwide [Pitbull] reflects on his journey to the top, performing shows across the globe, while the pop diva looks gorgeous as she vamps for the camera in the black-and-white clip." Trent Fitzgerald from PopCrush wrote that "Aguilera is looking rather svelte in her all-black leather outfit as she flirts for the camera."

== Live performances ==
Pitbull and Aguilera first performed "Feel This Moment" on November 18, 2012, at the 2012 American Music Awards ceremony with a medley of the song "Don't Stop the Party." On March 23, 2013, the pair performed the song at the 2013 Kids' Choice Awards. Pitbull also performed the song himself at the opening ceremony of the 2013 Indian Premier League.

Aguilera and Pitbull performed the song live during the 2013 Billboard Music Awards, which ended with a surprise appearance from Morten Harket of A-ha, who then performed a portion of "Take On Me". Pitbull and Aguilera performed the song at the season finale of the fourth season of the talent show The Voice on June 18, 2013.

== Track listing and formats ==
- Digital download
1. "Feel This Moment" (featuring Christina Aguilera) – 3:49
- CD single
1. "Feel This Moment" (featuring Christina Aguilera) – 3:51
2. "Don't Stop the Party" (featuring TJR) (R3hab & ZROQ Remix) – 3:36
- Remixes
1. "Feel This Moment" (Riddler Reid Stefan Remix) – 6:32

== Credits and personnel ==
- Armando C. Perez – vocals, songwriter
- Chantal Kreviazuk – songwriter
- Nolan Lambroza – songwriter, record producer
- Adam Messinger – songwriter, record producer
- Urales "DJ Buddha" Vargas – songwriter, record producer
- Christina Aguilera – vocals, songwriter
- Nasri – songwriter, record producer
- Morten Harket – songwriter, "Take On Me" (interpolation)
- Paul Waaktaar-Savoy – songwriter, "Take On Me" (interpolation)
- Magne Furuholmen – songwriter, "Take On Me" (interpolation)

== Charts ==
=== Weekly charts ===
Chart (2013–14)	Peak position
Australia (ARIA)	6
Austria (Ö3 Austria Top 40)	2
Belgium (Ultratop 50 Flanders)	7
Belgium (Ultratop 50 Wallonia)	6
Bulgaria (IFPI)	1
Brazil (Billboard Brasil Hot 100)	25
Brazil Hot Pop Songs	4
Canada Hot 100 (Billboard)	4
Canada CHR/Top 40 (Billboard)	3
Chile (Top 20 Chart)	1
CIS Airplay (TopHit)	2
Colombia (National-Report)	18
Czech Republic Airplay (ČNS IFPI)	1
Denmark (Tracklisten)	16
Euro Digital Song Sales (Billboard)	5
Finland (Suomen virallinen lista)	3
France (SNEP)	23
Germany (GfK)	9
Global Dance Tracks (Billboard)	4
Greece (Billboard)	8
Hungary (Dance Top 40)	6
Hungary (Rádiós Top 40)	9
Hungary (Single Top 40)	3
Ireland (IRMA)	13
Israel International Airplay (Media Forest)	6
Italy (FIMI)	20
Lebanon (The Official Lebanese Top 20)	20
Mexico (Monitor Latino)	3
Netherlands (Dutch Top 40)	6
Netherlands (Single Top 100)	11
New Zealand (Recorded Music NZ)	5
Norway (VG-lista)	6
Poland Airplay (ZPAV)	3
Poland Dance (ZPAV)	1
Portugal Digital Song Sales (Billboard)	10
Romania (Airplay 100)	14
Russia Airplay (TopHit)	4
Scottish Singles Sales (Official Charts)	2
Slovakia Airplay (ČNS IFPI)	4
Slovenia (SloTop50)	10
South Korean International Singles (GAON)	2
Spain (Promusicae)	1
Sweden (Sverigetopplistan)	21
Switzerland (Schweizer Hitparade)	7
Ukraine Airplay (TopHit)	23
UK Singles (Official Charts)	5
UK Dance (Official Charts)	1
US Billboard Hot 100	8
US Adult Pop Airplay (Billboard)	18
US Hot Dance/Electronic Songs (Billboard)	1
US Dance Club Songs (Billboard)	17
US Latin Airplay (Billboard)	19
US Pop Airplay (Billboard)	3
US Hot Rap Songs (Billboard)	3
US Rhythmic Airplay (Billboard)	4

2025–2026 weekly chart performance for "Feel This Moment"
Chart (2025–2026)	Peak position
Lithuania (AGATA)	33
Poland (Polish Streaming Top 100)	90

=== Year-end charts ===
Chart (2013)	Position
Australia (ARIA Charts)	35
Austria (Ö3 Austria Top 40)	17
Belgium (Ultratop Flanders)	47
Belgium (Ultratop Wallonia)	53
Brazil (Crowley)	49
Canada (Canadian Hot 100)	20
France (SNEP)	91
Germany (Media Control AG)	34
Denmark (Tracklisten)	45
Hungary (Dance Top 40)	18
Hungary (Rádiós Top 40)	18
Netherlands (Dutch Top 40)	31
Netherlands (Single Top 100)	56
New Zealand (Recorded Music NZ)	35
Russia Airplay (TopHit)	33
Slovenia (SloTop50)	42
Spain (PROMUSICAE)	13
Sweden (Sverigetopplistan)	54
Switzerland (Schweizer Hitparade)	31
Ukraine Airplay (TopHit)	52
UK Singles (Official Charts Company)	63
US Billboard Hot 100	36
US Hot Dance/Electronic Songs (Billboard)	7
US Hot Latin Songs (Billboard)	18
US Hot Rap Songs (Billboard)	5
US Mainstream Top 40 (Billboard)	32
US Rhythmic (Billboard)	30

Chart (2014)	Position
Hungary (Dance Top 40)	93

=== Decade-end charts ===
Chart (2010–2019)	Position
US Hot Dance/Electronic Songs (Billboard)	39

== Certifications ==
Region	Certification	Certified units/sales
Australia (ARIA)	3× Platinum	210,000^{^}
Austria (IFPI Austria)	Platinum	30,000^{*}
Belgium (BRMA)	Gold	15,000^{*}
Canada (Music Canada)	4× Platinum	320,000^{*}
Denmark (IFPI Danmark)	2× Platinum	180,000^{‡}
Germany (BVMI)	Platinum	300,000^{^}
Italy (FIMI)	Platinum	30,000^{*}
Mexico (AMPROFON)	2× Platinum+Gold	150,000^{*}
New Zealand (RMNZ)	2× Platinum	60,000^{‡}
Portugal (AFP)	Gold	10,000^{‡}
Spain (Promusicae)	Platinum	60,000^{‡}
Sweden (GLF)	Platinum	40,000^{‡}
Switzerland (IFPI Switzerland)	Platinum	30,000^{^}
United Kingdom (BPI)	Platinum	600,000^{‡}
United States (RIAA)	6× Platinum	6,000,000^{‡}
Streaming
Denmark (IFPI Danmark)	Platinum	2,600,000^{†}
Spain (Promusicae)	Gold	4,000,000^{†}
^{*} Sales figures based on certification alone.^{^} Shipments figures based on certification alone.^{‡} Sales+streaming figures based on certification alone.^{†} Streaming-only figures based on certification alone.

== Release history ==
Region	Date	Format	Label
Italy	January 18, 2013	Contemporary hit radio	Sony Music Italy
Germany	February 22, 2013	CD single	RCA Records
New Zealand	February 25, 2013	Digital download	RCA Records
United States	April 15, 2013	Adult contemporary radio	Mr. 305; Polo Grounds Music; RCA Records
Germany	April 19, 2013	Digital EP	RCA Records
