= Everybody Fucks =

Song by Pitbull featuring Akon and David Rush

from the album Global Warming
- Recorded: 2012
- Genre: Dance
- Length: 4:17
- Songwriter(s): Armando C. Perez; Gregor Salto; Danny Mercer; Jackson Morgan; Jencarlos Canela; Aliaune Thaim; Urales Vargas; Tzvetin Todorov; Kizzo
- Producer(s): Gregor Salto; Tzvetin Todorov; DJ Buddha

"Everybody Fucks" is a song recorded by American rapper Pitbull from his seventh studio album, Global Warming. The song features guest vocals from Akon & David Rush. It is included in the Global Warming album's Deluxe edition as one of the additional bonus tracks. The track was written by Armando C. Perez, Gregor Salto, Danny Mercer, Jackson Morgan, Jencarlos Canela, Aliaune Thaim, Urales Vargas, Tzvetin Todorov, Kizzo and produced by Gregor Salto, Tzvetin Todorov and DJ Buddha. The instrumental of the song was later interpolated on Romanian singer, INNA's 2013 single More than Friends.

The standard song cover carries the explicit title "Everybody Fucks". But in some countries, the song is being marketed as "Everybody F**ks". The track has charted on VG-lista, the official Norwegian Singles Chart.

== Chart performance ==
It has charted in VG-lista, the official Norwegian Singles Chart.

Chart (2013)	Peak position
Norway (VG-lista)	19
