= I Like How It Feels =

Enrique Iglesias single

Single by Enrique Iglesias featuring Pitbull and The WAV.s.

from the album Sex and Love
- Released: 10 September 2011
- Recorded: 2010
- Studio: South Point Studios, (Miami, Florida)
- Genre: Dance-pop; electro house
- Length: 3:38
- Label: Universal Republic
- Songwriters: Enrique Iglesias; RedOne; Pitbull; Alex P; Adam Baptiste; Björn Djupström; Bilal The Chef
- Producers: RedOne; Alex P

Enrique Iglesias singles chronology
"Ayer" (2011)	"I Like How It Feels" (2011)	"Naked" (2011)

Pitbull singles chronology
"Pass at Me" (2011)	"I Like How It Feels" (2011)	"Bailando Por El Mundo" (2011)

The WAV.s singles chronology
"I Like How It Feels" (2011)	"Down for Whatever" (2011)

Music video
- "I Like How It Feels" on YouTube

Audio sample
- "I Like How It Feels": file; help

"I Like How It Feels" is a song by Spanish recording artist Enrique Iglesias. The song was originally intended to be the lead single from a reissue of Iglesias' album Euphoria, however, the release was canceled. The song was later included on the international deluxe edition of his tenth studio album and second bilingual album Sex and Love. The song also features guest appearances from American rapper Pitbull and Swedish musical project The WAV.s. It is produced by Enrique's longtime collaborator RedOne. It is the third collaboration between Enrique and Pitbull following "I Like It" and Pitbull's song "Come 'n' Go" off his then latest album, Planet Pit. The song was released as a digital download in Australia and some European countries on 23 September 2011. The song was released as a digital download in the United States on 4 October 2011, although as of 2020, the song has been removed from most digital storefronts in the U.S.

== Background ==
"I Like How It Feels" is produced by RedOne who has worked with Enrique previously to produce hits such as "Takin' Back My Love", "I Like It" and "Dirty Dancer". The song was leaked on the Internet on 8 September 2011 after which it was uploaded to YouTube on 10 September 2011. The video has now received more than 38 million views. The video was directed by Enrique Iglesias. The song was released in some European countries on iTunes on 23 September 2011, and in the US and Canada on 4 October 2011.

== Critical reception ==
The single generally received positive reviews. Amy Sciarretto from Popcrush gave 3.5 stars (out of 5) and said, "It’s a simple set of lyrical declarations that celebrate being upbeat and enjoying life. There’s a fair amount of studio treatment on the song, but that’s a given with any epic, expansive pop song in 2011. We wouldn't be surprised if it becomes a staple at NFL stadiums this fall and winter, too." Meena Rupani from Desihits said," The upbeat track is sure to be on repeat just like their other collaboration tracks have been. It seems Enrique Iglesias and Pitbull can do no wrong when they come together on a song." Robbie Daw from Idolator said,"Enrique’s new RedOne-produced song has all the musical makings of an anthem, while the singer himself actually packs more of a soulful, emotional punch with his vocals than we've heard on recent singles like “Dirty Dancer,” “I Like It” and “Tonight (I’m Lovin’ You).”

Lewis Corner from Digital Spy gave the song 4 stars (out of 5) saying, "Enrique continues to channel the au courrant synths and chunky Euro beats combo that has kept him afloat over the past year. "It's my time, it's my life, I can do what I like/ For the price of a smile, I gotta take it to right," he certifies over a carnival cabaret of Rio de Janeiro proportions – and with another chart-friendly anthem under his belt, he certainly has reason to celebrate."

== Chart performance ==
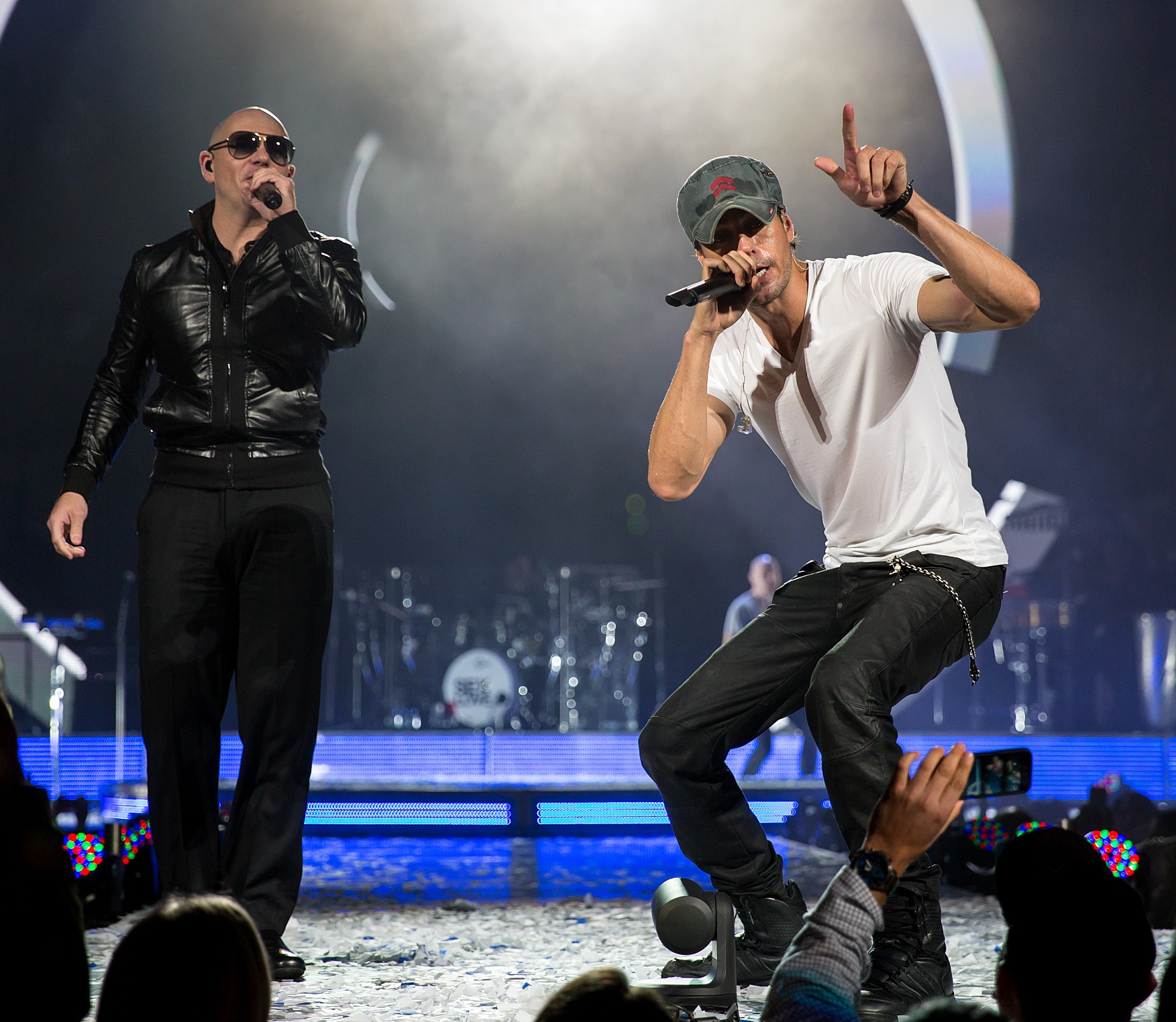
Enrique Iglesias performing with Pitbull in 2015

On the week of 29 September 2011 the song debuted at number 97 on the Canadian Hot 100 chart. It marks Enrique's 8th entry on this chart. It later peaked to #11 on the chart. It also debuted at number 47 on the ARIA charts on the week of 3 October 2011. Since then, it has managed to peak to #26. On the same day it debuted on 29 on New Zealand's RIANZ chart, peaking to #19. It debuted at #76 on the Billboard Hot 100 songs chart. However, due to low sales & low airplay count, it fell out of Hot 100 the following week. It was generally overlooked by US radio. It re-entered the chart at #74 following Enrique's performance of this song on American Music Awards of 2011 & 'The Cowboys Red-Cattle Campaign'. It debuted at #40 on the US Pop Songs chart on the week of 29 October. It peaked up to #39. The song topped the Billboard Hot Dance Club Songs, becoming Enrique's 10th #1 on that chart, listing Enrique in the top 10 Dance/Club Artists of all time.

== Use in media ==
- The song was used in a 2012 Australian commercial for Toyota Yaris.
- The song was used as part of the Australian Seven Network's promo for the 2012 AFL season and its expanded coverage.
- The song was performed by the three remaining finalists on The X Factor (Australia season 3)
- The Argentinian reality show Soñando por Cantar uses this song as their theme song, leading to great popularity in the country.
- A remix of the song was featured in a commercial for the 2012 NBA All-Star Game which featured Pitbull

== Music video ==
The music video for this single premiered on Friday 30 September 2011 via his official website and Vevo. The video is directed by Enrique himself & features guest appearance from stars including singers Juanes, Pitbull, Nicole Scherzinger, Nayer, actors Eva Longoria, Ken Jeong, George Lopez and tennis player Serena Williams. The video starts with Enrique playing on a beach with his dog. The video proceeds with some clips of Enrique's Euphoria tour, night out parties, backstage banter, and outdoor videos. The video depicts Enrique flying around Miami Beach, playing Baseball with small children, riding a speedboat along with his dog and partying with his friends. Pitbull comes along during his verse also seen partying with Enrique. Ken Jeong is shown writing the song and also dancing it. The video ends with credits to all involved.

== Live performance ==
Enrique Iglesias performed the song as a medley of two songs on American Music Awards of 2011. He first sang 'I Like How It Feels' with Choir & then broke into Tonight (I'm Lovin' You) with guest rap from Ludacris. He also performed the song at 'Salvation Army Red Kettle Campaign at Dallas Cowboys Thanksgiving Day Game' as a medley of three songs. He started with 'I Like How It Feels' with guest rap from Pitbull followed by Tonight (I'm Lovin' You) & I Like It.

== Track listing ==
U.S./UK Digital Download
No.	Title	Writer(s)	Length
1.	"I Like How It Feels"	Enrique Iglesias; RedOne; Pitbull; Alex P; Adam Baptiste; Björn Djupström; Bilal The Chef	3:40
2.	"I Like How It Feels" (Music Video)	Iglesias; RedOne; Pitbull; Alex P; Baptiste; Djupström; Bilal The Chef	6:18

U.K. Digital Download – The Remixes
No.	Title	Writer(s)	Length
1.	"I Like How It Feels"	Iglesias; RedOne; Pitbull; Alex P; Baptiste; Djupström; Bilal The Chef	3:40
2.	"I Like How It Feels (Benny Benassi Club Mix)"	Iglesias; RedOne; Pitbull; Alex P; Baptiste; Djupström; Bilal The Chef	5:29
3.	"I Like How It Feels (DJ Victoria Club Mix)"	Iglesias; RedOne; Pitbull; Alex P; Baptiste; Djupström; Bilal The Chef	6:00
4.	"I Like How It Feels (Jump Smokers Club Mix)"	Iglesias; RedOne; Pitbull; Alex P; Baptiste; Djupström; Bilal The Chef	5:14
5.	"I Like How It Feels (Sidney Samson Club Mix)"	Iglesias; RedOne; Pitbull; Alex P; Baptiste; Djupström; Bilal The Chef	6:18

== Remix ==
"I Like – The Remix"

Single by Pitbull featuring Enrique Iglesias and Afrojack
- A-side: "Get It Started"; "Don't Stop the Party"
- Released: 30 January 2012
- Genre: Hip house; electropop
- Length: 3:36
- Label: Polo Grounds, RCA, Mr. 305
- Songwriters: Armando C. Pérez, Enrique Iglesias, Nick van de Wall, Urales Vargas, RedOne, Alex Papaconstantinou, Adam Baptiste, Björn Djupström, Bilal "The Chef" Hajji
- Producers: Afrojack; DJ Buddha (co.)

Pitbull singles chronology
"Name of Love" (2012)	"I Like – The Remix" (2012)	"Back in Time" (2012)

Enrique Iglesias singles chronology
"Naked" (2011)	"I Like – The Remix" (2012)	"Finally Found You" (2012)

Afrojack singles chronology
"We're All No One" (2011)	"I Like – The Remix" (2012)	"Can't Stop Me" (2012)

On January 30, 2012, it was later re-released as "I Like (The Remix)", this time with Pitbull being the lead artist, and Enrique Iglesias being the featured artist and also featuring production from Afrojack. Originally a remix of "I Like How It Feels" by Afrojack, it was reworked by DJ Buddha and released as a single instead. The track was later featured as a B-side track on the CD releases of the Pitbull singles "Get It Started" and "Don't Stop the Party".

The song was selected as the official song of Miss USA 2012. This marks the second song by Pitbull to be used for a beauty pageant (after "Took My Love", a track from his album Planet Pit, which served as the official song of the rival Miss America 2012 pageant).

== Charts and certifications ==
Chart (2011–12)	Peak position
Belgium (Ultratop 50 Flanders)	43
Belgium (Ultratop 50 Wallonia)	43
Canada (Canadian Hot 100)	11
Canada CHR/Top 40 (Billboard)	23
Canada Hot AC (Billboard)	40
Denmark (Tracklisten)	31
Global Dance Tracks (Billboard)	8
Hungary (Rádiós Top 40)	37
Mexico (Billboard Mexican Airplay)	38
Mexico Anglo (Monitor Latino)	6
Netherlands (Single Top 100)	76
New Zealand (Recorded Music NZ)	19
Romania (Romanian Top 100)	67
Slovakia Airplay (ČNS IFPI)	14
Spain (Promusicae)	14
Spanish Airplay Chart (Promusicae)	1
UK Singles (The Official Charts Company)	135
US Billboard Hot 100	74
US Hot Dance Club Songs (Billboard)	1
US Pop Songs (Billboard)	39
US Latin Pop Songs (Billboard)	31

=== Certifications ===
Region	Certification	Certified units/sales
Australia (ARIA)	Gold	35,000^{^}
Canada (Music Canada)	Platinum	80,000^{*}
Mexico (AMPROFON)	Platinum	60,000^{*}
New Zealand (RMNZ)	Gold	7,500^{*}
^{*} Sales figures based on certification alone.^{^} Shipments figures based on certification alone.

== Release history ==
Country	Date	Format	Label
United States	4 October 2011	Mainsteam airplay	Universal Republic
United States	4 October 2011	Digital download	Universal Republic
Canada	4 October 2011	Digital download	Universal Republic
Australia	6 October 2011	Digital download	Universal Republic
Austria	6 October 2011	Digital download	Universal Republic
Belgium	6 October 2011	Digital download	Universal Republic
Denmark	6 October 2011	Digital download	Universal Republic
France	6 October 2011	Digital download	Universal Republic
Germany	6 October 2011	Digital download	Universal Republic
Italy	6 October 2011	Digital download	Universal Republic
Netherlands	6 October 2011	Digital download	Universal Republic
Norway	6 October 2011	Digital download	Universal Republic
Spain	6 October 2011	Digital download	Universal Republic
Sweden	6 October 2011	Digital download	Universal Republic
United Kingdom	20 November 2011	Digital download	Universal Republic

== See also ==
- List of number-one dance singles of 2011 (U.S.)
