= Sexy People (The Fiat Song) =

Single by Arianna featuring Pitbull
- Released: February 1, 2013
- Genre: Electro house; dance-pop
- Length: 3:28
- Label: RCA
- Songwriters: Armando C. Perez; Arianna Bergamaschi; Urales Vargas; José Garcia; Daniel Murcia; Flavio Ibba; Paolo Fedreghini; Olivier François; Jorge Gomez

Pitbull singles chronology
| "Feel This Moment" (2013) | "Sexy People (The Fiat Song)" (2013) | "Live It Up" (2013) |

Music video
- "Sexy People (The Fiat Song)" on YouTube

"Sexy People (The Fiat Song)" is a song by Italian singer-songwriter Arianna. The song was released as a single on February 1, 2013. The song features vocals from American singer and rapper Pitbull. It uses portions of the Italian song called "Torna a Surriento" composed in 1902 by Ernesto De Curtis.

The song is used to promote the Fiat 500 automobiles in the U.S.

== Track listing ==
Digital download

1. "Sexy People (The Fiat Song)" – 3:28
2. "Sexy People [Italian Version]" – 3:17
3. "Sexy People [Spanish Version]" – 3:27

== Music video ==
The official music video was released onto Arianna's official VEVO channel on April 26, 2013 and was directed by Rich Lee. It stars Pitbull on a pleasure boat with several women dancing around him. It features cameos by Adrienne Bailon, Dwayne Bowe, Chad Johnson, Dez Bryant, DJ Irie, Keana Texeira, Tristan Thompson, Tyson Ritter, Charlie Sheen and Shaggy. As of July 2017, the video has received over 17 million views.

The music video for the "Italian Version" was released onto Arianna's official VEVO channel on May 14, 2013. As of July 2017, the video has received over 1.2 million views.

== Chart performance ==
=== Weekly charts ===
| Chart (2013) | Peak position |
|---|---|
| Belgium (Ultratip Bubbling Under Wallonia) | 18 |
| Global Dance Tracks (Billboard) | 29 |
| Poland Dance (ZPAV) | 34 |
| US Billboard Hot 100 | 97 |
| US Dance Club Songs (Billboard) | 5 |
| US Hot Dance/Electronic Songs (Billboard) | 14 |

=== Year-end charts ===
| Chart (2013) | Position |
|---|---|
| US Hot Dance/Electronic Songs (Billboard) | 36 |

== Release history ==
Release dates and formats for "Sexy People (The Fiat Song)"
| Region | Date | Format | Label(s) | Ref. |
|---|---|---|---|---|
| United States | July 16, 2013 | Mainstream airplay | RCA | |
