= Don't Stop the Party (Pitbull song) =

2012 single by Pitbull

Single by Pitbull featuring TJR

from the album Global Warming
- Released: September 25, 2012
- Recorded: 2012
- Genre: Hip house; reggae
- Length: 3:26
- Label: Mr. 305; Polo Grounds; RCA
- Songwriters: Armando C. Pérez; TJ Rozdilsky; José García; Jorge Gomez Martinez; Warwick Lyn; Frederick Hibbert
- Producers: TJR; Chris Lake (additional)

Pitbull singles chronology
"Bad (Afrojack Remix) (DJ Buddha Edit)" (2012)	"Don't Stop the Party" (2012)	"Feel This Moment" (2013)

TJR singles chronology
"Ode to Oi" (2012)	"Don't Stop the Party" (2012)	"What's Up Suckaz" (2013)

Music video
- "Don't Stop the Party" on YouTube

"Don't Stop the Party" is a song recorded by American rapper Pitbull featuring American DJ and music producer TJR. It was released on September 26, 2012 by RCA Records as the third single for his seventh studio album, Global Warming. The song includes samples of the song "Funky Kingston" by Toots and the Maytals replayed by Mark Summers at Scorccio Sample Replays.

The song was written by the artists alongside José García and Jorge Gomez Martinez, with writing credits going to Warwick Lyn and Toots Hibbert for the aforementioned sample. TJR produced the song with additional production by Chris Lake. TJR had previously written the song as "Funky Vodka", which caught Pitbull's attention. It has peaked at number 17 on the US Billboard Hot 100.

== Background and composition ==
The song was originally titled "Funky Vodka" as written by TJR. It was played heavily at the Miami Winter Music Conference and caught the attention of Pitbull, who asked TJR to work with him for it to be a single from Global Warming.

Speaking about the viral success of the track, TJR has stated: "Funky Vodka is probably the track I'm most proud of. It was pretty cool to see an old school sample-based house tune make it to the overall number one spot on Beatport." "Funky Vodka" itself is based around the Jamaican reggae classic "Funky Kingston" (1973) by Toots and the Maytals. The sample replay of "Funky Kingston" was produced by Mark Summers at Scorccio Sample Replays. "Don't Stop the Party" is a hip house song, which has a running time of three minutes and twenty-six seconds (3:26) and an upbeat tempo of 127 beats per minute. The single version was written by TJR, Pitbull, Bigram Zayas, and Frederick "Toots" Hibbert. Marc Kinchen, TJR and DJ Buddha served as producers.

== Critical reception ==
Alexandra Capotorto of PopCrush said that the song "leaves something to be desired, since it’s super repetitive." It peaked at seventeen on the Billboard Hot 100. It reached number seven on the UK Singles Chart, and also managed to crack the top ten in Austria and Canada. In Australia, "Don't Stop The Party" debuted at twenty-three on October 8, 2012. The following week, it peaked at fifteen. In New Zealand, it debuted at thirty-seven on October 15; the following week it peaked at twenty-three. To date, it has peaked at sixteen on the Billboard Mainstream Pop Songs chart. Additionally, it broke into the top-twenty of the Billboard Hot Rap Songs chart, reaching five.

== Use in media ==
Darts player Peter Wright dances to the song during his walk-on.

"Don't Stop the Party" was used the promos of VH1 Latin America NEO: Musica Nueva. and in Chile, the song was used the promo of Telecanal A las 11 and credits of TVN's Juga2, and several episodes of Wena profe. The song was also played in the movies Last Vegas, About Last Night, Despicable Me 2, and Un gallo con muchos huevos.

Until 2015, Florida Panthers of the National Hockey League use "Don't Stop the Party" as their celebratory goal song at the BB&T Center, though they have since switched it to their victory song.

Until 2016, The St. Louis Blues of the National Hockey League use "Don't Stop the Party" as their team win song when they win a game at the Scottrade Center

Since 2015, Orlando Solar Bears of the ECHL use "Don't Stop the Party" as the goal song at the Amway Center

The Los Angeles Chargers of the National Football League began using the song in 2014 as their celebratory touchdown song at Qualcomm Stadium, and kept it as their song when they moved to the StubHub Center.

Since 2015, the song has been used in the background during competitions on Ant & Dec's Saturday Night Takeaway.

The Flophouse Commissie 16/17 also used this song as their walk-on song.

The Canada men's national junior ice hockey team used the song as their celebratory goal song in the 2019 World Junior Ice Hockey Championships.

The Chicago White Sox Major League Baseball team play the song after every White Sox home run at Rate Field.

The song was used for the opening number of Miss Universe 2020.

== Music video ==
The music video was first released onto Pitbull's official Vevo channel on October 26, 2012, and was directed by David Rosseau. It features Pitbull partying on a yacht with several people drinking vodka, in a house party with TJR, and on a bed with naked women, including porn stars Kennedy Leigh and Juliet La Rosa (Katana Kombat), and model Claudia Sampedro. The video has received over more than 200 million views.

== Live performances ==
Pitbull performed "Don't Stop The Party" at the 2012 MTV Europe Music Awards on November 11, 2012, in Frankfurt, Germany. Alexandra Capotorto noted that Pitbull: "looked like he was straight off the set of a Men in Black film during his performance." He was dressed in black with a white shirt underneath a pair of his signature dark sunglasses. Capotorto said: "he entertained the crowd with his song — and leave it to the master to have background dancers in the form of beautiful women dressed in tight white bodysuits and white wigs." He also performed it at the Latin Grammy Awards of 2012 at the Mandalay Bay Events Center on November 15. He also performed it at the 2012 American Music Awards. He also performed the song at the IPL 6 Opening Ceremony at Kolkata, India.

== Formats and track listings ==
Digital download

1. "Don't Stop the Party" (featuring TJR) – 3:26

CD single

1. "Don't Stop the Party" (featuring TJR) – 3:26
2. "I Like (The Remix)" (featuring Enrique Iglesias and Afrojack) – 3:37

== Credits and personnel ==
Credits adapted from the single's official liner notes.

- Armando C. Perez – vocals, songwriter
- Bigram Zayas – songwriter
- Frederick "Toots" Hibbert – songwriter
- Marc Kinchen – songwriter, record producer
- Urales "DJ Buddha" Vargas – songwriter, record producer
- TJR – vocals, songwriter

== Charts ==
=== Weekly charts ===
Chart (2012–2013)	Peak position
Australia (ARIA)	15
Austria (Ö3 Austria Top 40)	10
Belgium (Ultratop 50 Flanders)	22
Belgium (Ultratop 50 Wallonia)	39
Canada (Canadian Hot 100)	9
Canada CHR/Top 40 (Billboard)	12
Chile (Top 20 Chart)	5
Colombia (National-Report)	12
Czech Republic Airplay (ČNS IFPI)	10
France (SNEP)	174
Germany (GfK)	23
Global Dance Tracks (Billboard)	5
Hungary (Rádiós Top 40)	22
Hungary (Dance Top 40)	13
Ireland (IRMA)	20
Japan Hot 100 (Billboard)	24
Mexico (Billboard Mexican Airplay)	1
Netherlands (Single Top 100)	85
New Zealand (Recorded Music NZ)	23
Poland Dance (ZPAV)	14
Scottish Singles Sales (Official Charts)	9
Slovakia Airplay (ČNS IFPI)	32
Spain (Promusicae)	16
Switzerland (Schweizer Hitparade)	59
UK Singles (Official Charts)	7
US Billboard Hot 100	17
US Adult Pop Airplay (Billboard)	38
US Dance Club Songs (Billboard)	22
US Dance Airplay (Billboard)	5
US Latin Airplay (Billboard)	26
US Pop Airplay (Billboard)	15
US Rhythmic Airplay (Billboard)	9

Chart (2026)	Peak position
Lithuania (AGATA)	74

=== Year-end charts ===
Chart (2013)	Position
Canada (Canadian Hot 100)	56
UK Singles (Official Charts Company)	87
US Dance/Mix Show Airplay (Billboard)	21
US Digital Songs (Billboard)	73
US Rap Songs (Billboard)	22
US Rhythmic (Billboard)	46

== Certifications ==
Region	Certification	Certified units/sales
Australia (ARIA)	2× Platinum	140,000^{^}
Canada (Music Canada)	3× Platinum	240,000^{*}
Japan (RIAJ) Digital single	Gold	100,000^{*}
Mexico (AMPROFON)	Platinum+Gold	90,000^{*}
New Zealand (RMNZ)	Platinum	15,000^{*}
United Kingdom (BPI)	Platinum	600,000^{‡}
United States (RIAA)	3× Platinum	3,000,000^{‡}
^{*} Sales figures based on certification alone.^{^} Shipments figures based on certification alone.^{‡} Sales+streaming figures based on certification alone.

== Release history ==
Region	Date	Format	Label
Worldwide	September 27, 2012	Digital download	Polo Grounds, J
United States	September 25, 2012	Digital download	Mr. 305, Polo Grounds, RCA
United States	October 8, 2012	Mainstream airplay	Mr. 305, Polo Grounds, RCA
United Kingdom	November 30, 2012	Digital download	RCA, London
