= Live It Up (Jennifer Lopez song) =

Single by Jennifer Lopez featuring Pitbull
- Released: May 8, 2013
- Recorded: 2012–2013
- Genre: Electro house; dance-pop; Europop
- Length: 4:04
- Label: 2101; Capitol
- Songwriters: RedOne; Alex Papaconstantinou; Björn Djupström; Viktor Svensson; Armando Perez; Achraf Janussi; Bilal "The Chef" Hajji
- Producers: RedOne; Alex P; Viktor Svensson; Kuk Harrell

Jennifer Lopez singles chronology
"Sweet Spot" (2013)	"Live It Up" (2013)	"Adrenalina" (2014)

Pitbull singles chronology
"Sexy People (The Fiat Song)" (2013)	"Live It Up" (2013)	"Outta Nowhere" (2013)

Music video
- "Live It Up" on YouTube

"Live It Up" is a song recorded by American singer Jennifer Lopez. It was written by RedOne, Alex Papaconstantinou, Björn Djupström, Viktor Svensson, Armando "Pitbull" Perez (who is also the featured artist), Achraf Janussi and Bilal "The Chef" Hajji. It was produced by RedOne and Alex P, with co-production from Viktor Svensson and audio production by Kuk Harrell. The song marks the fourth collaboration between two artists following "Fresh Out the Oven" (2009), "On the Floor" (2011) and "Dance Again" (2012), the latter two of which achieved commercial success. "Live It Up" is a dance-pop and Europop song that features Lopez singing inspirational lyrics about living it up. It received generally positive reviews from music critics, with several critics predicting that it would be the summer hit of 2013.

"Live It Up" experienced moderate commercial success worldwide, entering the top-twenty in twelve countries including the United Kingdom, Canada and Australia; however, in the United States the song only managed to reach number 60, thus failing to achieve the same commercial success as Lopez's previous collaborations with Pitbull. Lopez performed the song live for the first time on the season 12 finale of American Idol on May 16, 2013. The following day, the song's music video was released; set in France, the video is divided into two halves including a chaotic fashion show in Paris, which contrasts the care-free environment of the beach in Saint-Tropez. The music video was nominated for Best Choreography at the 2013 MTV Video Music Awards.

== Background and release ==
Jennifer is a hard worker, very professional, gorgeous and she's a walking empire. Anytime I'm around her, I'm watching, learning, studying. It's a natural combination, like a student and teacher. I'm a student all day. I think it would be an honor for Jennifer to watch me grow and say, "That kid did learn."

— Pitbull, on partnering up with Lopez again, The Washington Post (2013)

In 2013, Lopez signed a new record deal with RedOne's 2101 Records which falls under the label's multi-year worldwide agreement with the then-EMI label and now Universal Music label Capitol Records, which will distribute the singer's future releases. Gerrick D. Kennedy of the Los Angeles Times said the deal "shouldn't come as a surprise" considering RedOne's role in Lopez's musical comeback two years prior. In an official press release, RedOne stated:

"This is like a dream come true for me [...] It was amazing to be able to work with Jennifer on so many great records over the past two years, and now it is such an honor to have her on my label. She is a creative inspiration and a true global superstar artist who brings so much to everything she does. I feel that this is historic and a wonderful opportunity to launch 2101/Capitol in this way".

"Live It Up", announced on April 24, 2013, was originally to serve as the lead single to Lopez's eighth studio album. Two days prior to the song's release, a low-quality snippet of "Live It Up" surfaced online. On May 8, 2013, it was premiered at the New York radio station WHTZ, where Lopez told host Elvis Duran that she had no intentions of setting a release date for its parent album, "I think we're going to release this first and then a few singles and then we'll decide when to put the album out". She added, "I'm more a believer of letting it gain momentum. Let there be demand for the album by putting out some great music first", although Digital Spy reported that it would be released in November 2013. Ultimately, Lopez's eighth studio album A.K.A. (2014) was released the following year, but "Live it Up" was not included on its final track listing. A sing-along lyric video for the song, described by The Huffington Post as having "colorful and energetic scenes", was uploaded to Lopez's official YouTube channel. The release of Lopez's new music coincides with her 3D concert film Jennifer Lopez: Dance Again, which documents her first world tour, 2012's Dance Again World Tour. The solo version of "Live It Up" premiered on June 5, 2013.

== Composition ==
"Live It Up"
A 25-second sample of the song's final chorus and breakdown. The chorus contains inspirational lyrics about "doing anything we want" and "living it up" over a "thumping" electro-dance beat. Its lyrical hook ("Let's hook tonight") is also featured.

"Live It Up" is an uptempo dance-pop and Europop song with a duration of four minutes and three seconds (4:03). The party-themed track was produced by RedOne and Alex P, who also wrote it alongside Björn Djupström, Viktor Svensson, Pitbull, Achraf Janussi and Bilal "The Chef" Hajji. Carl Williot of the website Idolator noted its "club-ready chorus" and prominent EDM breakdown, while comparing the "fierceness" in Lopez's vocals during the song's bridge to Beyoncé's song "Run the World (Girls)". The "high-energy" track utilizes a drum-patterned "fist-pumping" electro beat, as well as heavy synths. The song contains the "sonic disruptions" of dubstep in the breakdown. Pitbull's lyrics have a recurring theme of feminism.

"Live It Up" opens with Pitbull's bilingual verse, which contains lyrics such as "Jenny from the Block, let's rock" and "She's screaming YOLO", as well as "We don't believe in defeat, what's why we're back for a threepeat", which references the duo collaborating once again. Lopez arrives with lusty lyrics about "things blowing and spots being hit". A pre-chorus occurs before a "shouty" euphoric-themed chorus, where Lopez sings about living it up, and "doing anything we want" as well not "stopping 'till we're done". The song's hook then occurs, Günther states "Make love, don't fight. Let's hook tonight", followed by a thunderous "noisy beat" dance breakdown. Lopez' lyrics in the second verse include, "Turn up this mother, and let it play/ I know you like my bumper, don't be ashamed/ Don't even wonder, it's just a game/We're rocking body to body let's go insane". According to Amy Sciarretto of PopCrush, "Live It Up" is a "full-on club banger" that would "fit quite nicely" on a David Guetta album.

== Critical response ==
The song received generally positive reviews. When the solo version of "Live It Up" was released, Lansky commented that it should be made the "official version" of the song. He wrote that it should be "law" that if "your song features Pitbull, will.i.am or Flo Rida, you are legally mandated to release a solo version so nobody has to suffer". Jason Lipshutz of Billboard called the song a "dance-ready summer anthem", writing that Lopez "seems to be having a blast" in the song, "tossing out inspirational phrases about doing anything we want, living it up, not stopping, and going". He also noted, "Like graham crackers, marshmallows and chocolate, the combination of Jennifer Lopez, Pitbull and producer RedOne has proven to be endlessly winning". Gerrick D. Kennedy of the Los Angeles Times called the song a "typical Euro-pop jam that RedOne probably weaves in his sleep" that sounds "perfect for summer". Writing for She Knows Entertainment, Natasha Shankar thought the chorus was "forced", but however described the song as "catchy" and "vivacious and strong, just like the songstress herself".

Amy Sciarretto of PopCrush wrote that while the song will get its "fair share" of remixes and club play, it will also "find a home on the radio and in mall clothing stores". According to Sciarretto, the production "makes you think if there ever was a song that sounds like Miami, this is it". Sciarretto wrote that while the song is in typical Lopez and Pitbull fashion, but "they've switched it up this time on the production end of things, thanks to the multiple layers of synthy beats". She concluded that in September 2013, "Live It Up" will be "one of those songs that defines the three months that came before it". The New York Daily News felt that "Live It Up" was strikingly similar to "Dance Again", but stated that it had potential to be a summer hit, praising its "make love, don't fight/let's hook tonight". Similarly, Digital Spy's Robert Copsey said the song felt "very by-numbers" until Günther announces "Make love, don't fight/ Let's hook tonight", which he said allowed it to become "something we never dreamed possible: a colourful and completely bonkers number that, by comparison, makes Nicki Minaj's 'Starships' sound pedestrian". Additionally, Copsey noted that there is an "argument that says once you've heard one J Lo/Pitbull/RedOne collaboration then you've heard them all". He, however, disagreed, and wrote that "you won't hear us complaining if it turns into an annual tradition".

Sugey Palomares of Latina stated, "This is the third time J.Lo has joined forces with the hit-making producer and Mr. 305, which is no surprise considering the success they garnered in the past. We definitely think third times a charm". Nate Jones of the website PopDust found the fact that Lopez collaborated with Pitbull once again "odd", and wrote that "For artists who aren’t married, and never were in any sort of band together, this is a pretty rare thing". Jones concluded that "If you’re looking for [an] analogue for Pitbull and Jennifer Lopez’s relationship, it’s helpful to think of Pitbull as a nerdy teenage boy and Lopez as his friend’s hot older sister". Katie Hasty of HitFix was negative, however, and called the song a "cheap [...] seasonal drug store-bought toy". She wrote that the song fits the "general guidelines" for a "summer jam", but that is disposable and interchangeable.

== Commercial performance ==
"Live It Up" has experienced moderate success, but not to the extent of "On the Floor" or "Dance Again". For the week of May 13, 2013, it entered the US Billboard Pop Songs chart at number 33 and the US Billboard Hot 100 at number 73, becoming the second highest debut for the week on both charts. To date, the song is Lopez's 23rd entry on the Hot 100, excluding featured singles. "Live It Up" also charted on the US Dance/Electronic Digital Songs chart at number eleven, with first-week sales of 43,000 downloads, which also allowed it enter the Hot Digital Songs at number 43. The next week, sales of the single rose by 53%, bringing its total to 135,000 digital downloads sold in the US. "Live it Up" peaked at number 60 on the Hot 100. Though performing unsuccessfully on the US Billboard Hot 100, "Live It Up" managed to top the US Billboard Hot Dance Club Songs chart, making it her tenth consecutive number one dance hit, as well as her fourteenth number one overall.

"Live It Up" has been more successful in the international music market, having entered the top twenty in eleven countries. The song marks her twenty-first chart entry on the Canadian Hot 100, where it debuted at number 81 and has since peaked at number 16. In Australia, it debuted at number 20 on the ARIA Charts for the week ending June 2, 2013. This marked an improvement in comparison to "Dance Again", which debuted at number 44 and peaked at just 28, failing to enter the top twenty. It fared better on the Australian Urban Singles Chart, where it has met a peak of number five. "Live It Up" entered the South Korean International Gaon Chart at number four, its highest debut. In Belgium, the single has peaked at number five in Wallonia and number three in Flanders. It also debuted at number 19 in Spain. In the United Kingdom, "Live It Up" made its entry at number 17 on the UK Singles Chart, while also peaking at number three on the UK R&B Chart.

== Music video ==
=== Development ===
The music video for "Live It Up" is, in Lopez's own words, "one of the more fun videos that I've ever done". Soon after she teased the release of the single, writing "Are you ready for what's coming?" on social networking website Twitter, choreographer Casper Smart announced that he was holding auditions for the music video alongside choreographers JR Taylor and Lyle Beniga. The official music video for "Live It Up" was directed by Jessy Terrero. While Lopez was being interviewed on the music video's set by Entertainment Tonight’s Rob Marciano, gun shots were fired close to its location, although security officials confirmed that the entertainer was secured inside her vehicle. The incident, unrelated to the filming of the music video, occurred less than 400 meters away. No one was injured, and police reportedly detained multiple people. Starting May 13, 2013, Entertainment Tonight aired its "J.Lo week", which featured Marciano's interview with Lopez and behind-the-scenes making of the video clips as well as exclusive sneak peeks. Instantly following Lopez's performance of the song on American Idol, the singer posted a sneak peek of the music video on Twitter. The full-length music video premiered on Entertainment Tonight and was uploaded to Lopez's Vevo account on May 17, 2013. In the clip, Lopez shows "all sides of herself" from "runway fashionista" to "beach babe".

=== Fashion ===
Lopez sports a variety of different "risque" costumes in the music video for "Live It Up". The Huffington Post noted that Lopez went for a "bronze goddess" look. She also wore a chunky Egyptian style gold choker at one stage. Entertainment Tonight described another costume, a black "edgy" feathered frock.

=== Synopsis ===
The clip for "Live It Up" begins in Paris, France. Lopez is clothed in a black-feathered frock and preparing for a fashion show with several other models. Pitbull is partying on the beach in Saint-Tropez and texts Lopez using a Nokia smartphone, asking him to join her. One of the models seen readying themselves for the fashion show is America's Next Top Model alum Eva Marcille. Lopez soon takes center spotlight on the catwalk runway where she dances to a choreographed routine that is a reminiscent of her music video for "I'm Glad". Present on the catwalk are trapeze rings. Viewers of the fashion show gaze, cry and clap for the singer in awe, as she later greets them. Moments later, she reappears on the catwalk, now wearing a red-leather bodysuit with a blonde fringe continuing to dance to the music. Soon, these scenes are inter cut with the singer lying on a beach chair overlooking the shore with wet hair, an orange swimsuit and vibrant orange lipstick. After the fashion show, Lopez now appears on the beach in Saint-Tropez, partying and dancing with Pitbull and everyone else, now clothed in a loose green kaftan. Towards the end of the clip, more settings are shown. In one, Lopez and her dancers are performing intricate choreography in a green laser-filled club. The video ends with a shot of Lopez on the beach.

=== Reception ===
Rap-Up called the music video "sizzling" and "celebratory", praising the "feel-good" visuals directed by Terraro. The New York Daily News writer Victoria Taylor praised Lopez's physicality in the music video, stating: "The 43-year-old mother of twins proves she's still a fly girl as she bares her toned midriff [in the video]", also lauding the costumes she wore in it. Christina Lee of Idolator commented that the music video is "a flashy clip showing that even if Pitbull calls (okay, texts) and America’s Next Top Model alumnus Eva Marcille appears, J. Lo will still steal the show", while also stating that Lopez channels her "inner Baby" during the choreography.

Peggy Truong of Celebuzz stated that the clip had a "dose of fabulousness" and a "handful of product placements", referring to the video's promotion of Ice-Watch, Nokia and Swarovski. Similarly, Dave Lewis of HitFix said it "features more product placements than you can count. Well, not if you can count beyond 6 or so, but still it's a lot of blatant product placements for some pretty extravagant products". Michael Smith of The Guardian Express also praised Lopez's beauty and physicality, writing: "43 year-old mother of two, Jennifer Lopez is proving that she’s not getting older, she’s getting fitter as she shows off some seriously flat abs". Smith also commented that "Jennifer aka J-Lo from back in the day she lived on the block, knows how to jumpstart the summer season with a sexy, kicking music video to accompany her new single". Kristina Lopez of the website On The Red Carpet called the music video "fun" and "flashy". In July 2013, the music video received an MTV Video Music Award nomination for Best Choreography.

== Live performances ==
Lopez and Pitbull performed the song for the first time on the May 16, 2013 finale episode of American Idol, where she was previously a judge on seasons 10 and 11, and received a standing ovation from judge Mariah Carey. Prior to Pitbull opening the performance, a monologue by Lopez was heard, in which she exclaimed, "Don't have regrets because at one time, everything you did was exactly what you wanted". HollywoodLife's Jenny Pickard called it a "dance-heavy" performance, stating: "[Lopez] perfectly balanced showing off her seductive dance moves and singing the lyrics to the song". She wore a "skimpy" white dress with knee-high boots. Her back-up dancers performed acrobatics on swings lining the stage. Pickard noted that she was given the "prime performance spot right before the big reveal" of the season's winner. The Belfast Telegraph called it a "show-stopping performance". Lopez and Pitbull performed the song at the 2013 Billboard Music Awards on May 19, 2013. Dressed in a "fiery" red outfit, she sported a sequined red leotard with feather sleeves and a matching pair of thigh-high peep-toe boots; this was a replica of one of the outfits worn in the music video. Jessica Sager of PopCrush said she showed off her "legendary legs and "derriere" during the performance, describing the "dancing, fashion and music" as "appropriately fierce, and no one could stop dancing". Furthermore, the performance received widespread praise. Lopez performed the song at the 2013 Premios Juventud with Pitbull on July 18, 2013, also she received the Icono Mundial award.

=== Controversy ===
Lopez performed the song on the second semi final of Britain's Got Talent on May 28, 2013. Unlike her previous performances of "Live It Up", however, Lopez's provocative attire and dance moves during the family-friendly show performance garnered worldwide media controversy, considered overtly sexual for prime-time television in the UK and "raunchy". Media regulator Ofcom confirmed that they had received over 100 complaints over the performance in 24 hours. Although the television series judges such as Simon Cowell were "blown away", the performance drew complaints for viewers for being too "sexed-up" as she "flashed a whole lot of her famous figure". In defense of her performance Lopez stated "I don’t think I’m racier than any other female pop artist."

== Track listings ==
- Digital download
1. "Live It Up" (featuring Pitbull) – 4:04
- Digital download
1. "Live It Up" – 3:40
- Indian CD single
1. "Live It Up" (featuring Pitbull) – 4:03
2. "Live It Up" (instrumental) – 4:03

== Credits and personnel ==
- RedOne – songwriter, producer
- Alex Papaconstantinou – songwriter, producer
- Björn Djupström – songwriter
- Viktor Svensson – songwriter, co-producer
- Jennifer Lopez – lead vocals
- Armando Perez – songwriter
- Achraf Janussi – songwriter
- Bilal "The Chef" Hajji – songwriter
- Kuk Harrell – audio production, recording
- Anthony Falcone – engineer
- Peter Marc Stahl – engineer
- Trevor Muzzy – mix engineer, recording
- Gene Grimaldi – mastering
- Josh Gudwin – recording
- Chris "TEK" O'Ryan – recording
- Al Burna – recording

Credits adapted from CD single liner notes.

== Charts ==
=== Weekly charts ===
Weekly chart performance for "Live It Up"
Chart (2013–2014)	Peak position
Australia (ARIA)	20
Austria (Ö3 Austria Top 40)	23
Belgium (Ultratip Bubbling Under Flanders)	2
Belgium (Ultratop 50 Wallonia)	32
Canada Hot 100 (Billboard)	16
Canada CHR/Top 40 (Billboard)	28
Canada Hot AC (Billboard)	40
Czech Republic Airplay (ČNS IFPI)	20
Euro Digital Songs (Billboard)	17
Finland (Suomen virallinen latauslista)	12
France (SNEP)	67
Germany (GfK)	36
Global Dance Tracks (Billboard)	33
Greece (IFPI Greece)	7
Greece Digital Songs (Billboard)	6
Hungary (Dance Top 40)	26
Hungary (Rádiós Top 40)	29
Ireland (IRMA)	13
Israel International Airplay (Media Forest)	7
Italy (FIMI)	36
Japan (Hot 100 Singles)	59
Lebanon (The Official Lebanese Top 20)	9
Mexico (Billboard Mexican Airplay)	48
Mexico Anglo (Monitor Latino)	15
New Zealand (Recorded Music NZ)	27
Poland Airplay (ZPAV)	3
Poland (Video Chart)	3
Romania (Airplay 100)	52
Scottish Singles Sales (Official Charts)	13
Slovakia Airplay (ČNS IFPI)	4
South Korea (International Chart)	4
Spain (Promusicae)	10
Sweden (Sverigetopplistan)	49
Switzerland (Schweizer Hitparade)	33
UK Singles (Official Charts)	17
UK Hip Hop/R&B (Official Charts)	3
US Billboard Hot 100	60
US Pop Airplay (Billboard)	26
US Hot Dance Club Songs (Billboard)	1
US Dance/Electronic Songs (Billboard)	11
US Latin Airplay (Billboard)	22
US Rhythmic Airplay (Billboard)	39

=== Year-end charts ===
Year-end chart performance for "Live It Up"
Chart (2013)	Position
Spain (PROMUSICAE)	49
US Dance Club Songs (Billboard)	49
US Dance/Electronic Songs (Billboard)	24

== Certifications ==
Certifications for "Live It Up"
Region	Certification	Certified units/sales
Australia (ARIA)	Gold	35,000^{^}
Brazil (Pro-Música Brasil)	Gold	30,000^{‡}
Canada (Music Canada)	Gold	40,000^{*}
^{*} Sales figures based on certification alone.^{^} Shipments figures based on certification alone.^{‡} Sales+streaming figures based on certification alone.

== Release history ==
Release dates for "Live It Up"
Country	Date	Format	Label
France	May 8, 2013	Digital download	Universal
Finland	May 8, 2013	Digital download	Universal
Germany	May 8, 2013	Digital download	Universal
Italy	May 8, 2013	Digital download	Universal
Luxembourg	May 8, 2013	Digital download	Universal
Netherlands	May 8, 2013	Digital download	Universal
New Zealand	May 8, 2013	Digital download	Universal
Norway	May 8, 2013	Digital download	Universal
Spain	May 8, 2013	Digital download	Universal
Sweden	May 8, 2013	Digital download	Universal
Switzerland	May 8, 2013	Digital download	Universal
Canada	May 14, 2013	Digital download	Universal
United States	May 14, 2013	Digital download	2101; Capitol
United States	May 21, 2013	Contemporary hit radio	2101; Capitol
Ireland	May 24, 2013	Digital download	Capitol
United Kingdom	May 26, 2013	Digital download	Capitol

== See also ==
- List of number-one dance singles of 2013 (U.S.)
