= Get It Started =

Single by Pitbull featuring Shakira

from the album Global Warming (Deluxe Edition)
- Released: June 25, 2012
- Recorded: 2012
- Studio: Casa Campo (La Romana, Dominican Republic); RG Studios (Gdansk, Poland)
- Genre: Dance-pop; Eurodance
- Length: 4:05
- Label: Mr. 305; Polo Grounds; RCA
- Songwriters: Armando C. Pérez; Durrell Babbs; Urales Vargas; Sidney Samson; Marc Kinchen; Bigram Zayas; Shakira; Kris Stephens
- Producers: Sidney Samson; Marc Kinchen; Develop; DJ Buddha

Pitbull singles chronology
"Beat on My Drum" (2012)	"Get It Started" (2012)	"Bad (Remix)" (2012)

Shakira singles chronology
"Addicted to You" (2012)	"Get It Started" (2012)	"Dançando" (2013)

Music video
- "Get It Started" on YouTube

"Get It Started" is a song by American recording artist Pitbull from his seventh studio album Global Warming. It was released on June 25, 2012, as the second single from the album by RCA Records. The song features guest vocals from Colombian singer-songwriter Shakira, marking the third time they have collaborated on a song together, the others being an official remix to the Spanish version of "Did it Again", "Lo Hecho Está Hecho", and the English version of "Rabiosa". The artists co-wrote the song with its producers, DJ Buddha, Sidney Samson, Marc Kinchen, Develop, with additional writing from Durrell "Tank" Babbs and Kris Stephens. It is a dance-pop song that "blends a dance beat and up-tempo verses with a slowed-down, piano-driven pop chorus".

Commercially, the song fared well, notably reaching the top ten in the Czech Republic, Hungary and Lebanon. (Note: See #Charts)

== Background and release ==
Pitbull and Shakira first collaborated with each other in 2010 from her seventh studio album Sale el Sol (2010), Shakira enlisted Pitbull to co-write the English and Spanish versions of the songs "Loca" and "Rabiosa". Pitbull appears on the English version of the latter.

In June 2011 Pitbull revealed that he had reached out to Shakira to appear on his single "Give Me Everything". Shakira declined his offer, citing personal issues, but stated that she would be open to a collaboration with him in the future, but "not now". Pitbull then sent the verse he offered to Shakira song to Ne-Yo, who recorded it and "knocks it out of the park". Pitbull then reached out to Shakira once again, stating that: "I think this is really going to be a monster, I would love for you to be a part of it, if not cool". She declined the second verse offered to her, and it went to Nayer.

On October 7, 2011, the RCA Music Group announced it was disbanding J Records along with Arista Records and Jive Records. With the shutdown, Pitbull (and all other artists previously signed to these three labels) will release his future material on the RCA Records brand. Pitbull revealed in March 2012 that he and Shakira had recorded a new song together. He stated that the song was "a follow up to what we have going on with the 'Men in Black(III)'." He concluded by stating that: "I look forward to anything I have to do with Shakira". Shakira recorded her vocals for the song in Barcelona, while Pitbull recorded his in the Dominican Republic. The song was leaked online on June 25, 2012.

Pitbull performed this during the MDA Show of Strength on September 2, 2012, with video footage of Shakira in the background.

== Composition ==
"Get It Started"
A 21-second sample of "Get It Started", displaying the chorus and "heart-wrung hook" as sung by Shakira over a dance-pop beat.

"Get It Started" is a dance-pop and Eurodance song with a duration of four minutes and five seconds. It was written by Pitbull, Bigram Zayas, Durrell Babbs, Kris Stephens, Marc Kinchen, Sidney Samson, Urales Vargas, and Shakira, and produced by DJ Buddha, Marc Kinchen, Develop and Sidney Samso. The song's composition "blends a dance beat and up-tempo verses with a slowed-down, piano-driven pop chorus", with "a pummeling synth instrumental to back the Latin-rap heavyweight’s high-energy verses." After each chorus, there is a eurodance beat.

Shakira provides the "heart-wrung hook" on "Get It Started", "emoting as the beat breaks off into a subtle stomp" before quickly "returning in full force seconds later". in the chorus, she sings: "Everytime I look into your eyes / I feel like I could stare in them for a lifetime / we can get started for life." On the song, Pitbull talks about "his passports and his world travels", singing: "To these rappers I apologize, I know it ain’t fair / Only ball I drop, New Year’s Times Square / The world is mine / Sixth sense, I see the seven signs / Now baby, let’s get started for life." He also names Tom Cruise on the lyrics, although in a way "that would have Cruise’s lawyers come knocking on his door", in reference to his past legal issues with Lindsay Lohan.

== Music video ==
The music video was first released onto Pitbull's official VEVO channel on August 2, 2012, and was directed by David Rosseau. Shakira shot her part of the video in Barcelona, Spain, while Pitbull shot his part in Madrid, Spain. The music video has scenes that cut between the two and has them separately on top of a clock tower. After the line "don't start what you can't finish", it shows Pitbull driving very fast in traffic before the outro, where he is on stage performing the song. The video has received over 76 million views.

== Formats and track listings ==
Digital download

1. "Get It Started" (feat. Shakira) – 4:05
2. "Back in Time" (Play-n-Skillz Remix) - 3:38

CD single

1. "Get It Started" (feat. Shakira) – 4:06
2. "I Like (The Remix)" (feat. Enrique Iglesias and Afrojack) – 3:37

== Credits and personnel ==
- Armando C. Perez – vocals, songwriter
- Durrell Babbs – songwriter
- Kris Stephens – songwriter
- Marc Kinchen – songwriter, record producer
- Sidney Samson – songwriter, record producer
- Urales "DJ Buddha" Vargas – songwriter, record producer
- Shakira – vocals, songwriter
- Develop – songwriter, record producer

== Charts ==
Chart (2012)	Peak position
Australia (ARIA)	31
Austria (Ö3 Austria Top 40)	17
Belgium (Ultratip Bubbling Under Flanders)	5
Belgium (Ultratip Bubbling Under Wallonia)	8
CIS Airplay (TopHit)	183
Brazil (Billboard Hot 100 Airplay)	22
Brazil (Billboard Hot Pop Songs)	1
Canada Hot 100 (Billboard)	42
Canada CHR/Top 40 (Billboard)	36
Czech Republic Airplay (ČNS IFPI)	7
Finland (Suomen virallinen lista)	14
France (SNEP)	57
Germany (GfK)	31
Global Dance Tracks (Billboard)	27
Honduras (Honduras Top 50)	12
Hungary (Single Top 40)	2
Italy (Musica e Dischi)	44
Lebanon (The Official Lebanese Top 20)	7
Mexico (Billboard Mexican Airplay)	22
Romania (Romanian Top 100)	59
Slovakia Airplay (ČNS IFPI)	18
South Korea (Gaon Chart)	13
Spain (Promusicae)	14
Sweden (Sverigetopplistan)	47
Switzerland (Schweizer Hitparade)	32
UK Singles (OCC)	64
US Billboard Hot 100	89
US Dance Club Songs (Billboard)	7
US Hot Latin Songs (Billboard)	48
US Pop Airplay (Billboard)	34
US Rhythmic Airplay (Billboard)	37

== Certifications ==
Region	Certification	Certified units/sales
Australia (ARIA)	Gold	35,000^{‡}
Brazil (Pro-Música Brasil)	Gold	30,000^{‡}
Canada (Music Canada)	Gold	40,000^{*}
Mexico (AMPROFON)	Gold	30,000^{*}
Streaming
Denmark (IFPI Danmark)	Gold	900,000^{†}
^{*} Sales figures based on certification alone.^{‡} Sales+streaming figures based on certification alone.^{†} Streaming-only figures based on certification alone.

== Release history ==
Region	Date	Format	Label
United States	July 10, 2012	Rhythmic radio	Mr.305 / Polo Grounds Music / RCA
United States	July 17, 2012	Top 40/Mainstream radio	Mr.305 / Polo Grounds Music / RCA
United Kingdom	September 17, 2012	Digital download	Mr.305 / Polo Grounds Music / RCA
Germany	September 28, 2012	CD single	Mr.305 / Polo Grounds Music / RCA
United States	November 25, 2013	Digital download	RCA / Sony
