= Outta Nowhere =

Single by Pitbull featuring Danny Mercer

from the album Global Warming
- Released: May 28, 2013
- Recorded: 2012
- Genre: Pop rock; rap rock
- Length: 3:26
- Label: Mr. 305; Polo Grounds; RCA
- Songwriters: Armando C. Perez; Danny Mercer; James T. Huy
- Producer: Danny Mercer

Pitbull singles chronology
"Live It Up" (2013)	"Outta Nowhere" (2013)	"Habibi I Love You" (2013)

Music video
- "Outta Nowhere (The Global Warming Listening Party)" on YouTube

"Outta Nowhere" is a song by Cuban-American rapper Pitbull featuring Colombian-American recording artist Danny Mercer, taken from the former's seventh studio album Global Warming. The song was released on May 28, 2013 by Mr. 305, Polo Grounds Music, and RCA Records as the second promotional single from the album. "Outta Nowhere" was written by Armando C. Perez, Danny Mercer and James T. Huy while production was handled by Danny Mercer.

== Music video ==
The music video was filmed in July 2013 by director Jessy Terrero, however, for unknown reasons, Pitbull decided to cancel the upload of the music video.

== Production ==
The song was initially recorded by Nicole Scherzinger, and a video of her recording the track can be found in her VH1 Behind the Music interview. The song was then turned over to Nick Wells, whom recorded his version with Danny Murk before being sent over to Pitbull for the final product.

== Track listing and formats ==
- Digital download
1. "Outta Nowhere" (featuring Danny Mercer) – 3:26
- Promo CD
1. "Timber" (featuring Kesha) – 3:24
2. "Outta Nowhere" (featuring Danny Mercer) – 3:26

== Credits and personnel ==
Credits adapted from the single's official liner notes.

- Armando C. Perez – vocals, songwriter
- Danny Mercer – vocals, songwriter, record producer

== Charts ==
Chart (2013)	Peak position
Austria (Ö3 Austria Top 40)	19
Belgium (Ultratip Bubbling Under Flanders)	20
Canada CHR/Top 40 (Billboard)	46
Germany (GfK)	67
Lebanon (The Official Lebanese Top 20)	14
Netherlands (Dutch Top 40)	34
Slovakia Airplay (ČNS IFPI)	77
US Pop Airplay (Billboard)	32

== Release history ==
Region	Date	Format
United States	May 28, 2013	Mainstream radio
United States	June 18, 2013	Rhythmic radio
Italy	June 21, 2013	Mainstream radio
