= Echa Pa'lla (Manos Pa'rriba) =

Single by Pitbull featuring Papayo

from the album Global Warming (deluxe edition) and Armando
- Released: July 16, 2012
- Recorded: 2012
- Genre: Latin pop
- Length: 3:16
- Label: Mr. 305; Polo Grounds; RCA
- Songwriters: Perez; Gregor Salto; Manuel Corao; Vargas; Tzvetin Todorov
- Producers: DJ Buddha; Gregor Salto; Todorov

Pitbull singles chronology
"I'm Off That" (2012)	"Echa Pa'lla (Manos Pa'rriba)" (2012)	"Everybody Fucks (featuring Akon and David Rush)" (2012)

"Echa Pa'lla (Manos Pa'rriba)" [Shortening of Echa Para Allá (Manos Para Arriba)] (English version known as "Go Away (Hands Up)") is a Latin Grammy award-winning song by American recording artist Pitbull for his seventh studio album Global Warming. The song features guest vocals from Papayo and was released on July 16, 2012. It was produced by Gregor Salto, Todorov and Urales "DJ Buddha" Vargas. "Echa Pa'lla" achieved moderate chart success and found its way in Billboard Top Latin Songs. The song peaked number 5 on the Billboard Tropical Songs Chart. It was also the official Miss Teen USA 2012 theme song. "Echa Pa'lla" won the Latin Grammy Award for Best Urban Performance. At the 2014 Lo Nuestro Awards, it won the award for Urban Song of the Year at the 26th Lo Nuestro Awards.

== Track listing ==
Digital download

1. "Echa Pa'lla (Manos Pa'rriba)" – 3:16
2. "Echa Pa'lla (Manos Pa'rriba)" [Single Version] – 3:19
3. "Echa Pa'lla (Manos Pa'rriba) [English Version]" – 3:19

== Credits and personnel ==
Credits and personnel for the track includes:

- Armando C. Perez – vocals, songwriter
- Manuel Corao – songwriter
- Urales "DJ Buddha" Vargas – songwriter, record producer
- Tzvetin Todorov – songwriter, producer

== Charts ==
Chart (2012)	Peak position
US Hot Latin Songs (Billboard)	2
US Latin Pop Airplay (Billboard)	6
US Latin Rhythm Airplay (Billboard)	1

== Certifications ==
Region	Certification	Certified units/sales
Spain (Promusicae)	Gold	30,000^{‡}
United States (RIAA)	Gold	500,000^{‡}
^{‡} Sales+streaming figures based on certification alone.
