= Global Warming (Pitbull album) =

Studio album by Pitbull
- Released: November 16, 2012
- Recorded: 2012
- Genres: Pop rap; EDM; dance-pop
- Length: 40:58
- Labels: Mr. 305; Polo Grounds; RCA Records
- Producers: Armando Perez; Afrojack; Bigram Zayas; Durrell Babbs; soFLY & Nius; Kris Stephens; Adam Messinger; Nasri; Sir Nolan; DJ Buddha; DJ Spydr; Marc Kinchen; DJ Class; Sidney Samson

Pitbull chronology
Planet Pit (2011)	Global Warming (2012)	Globalization (2014)

Singles from Global Warming
- 1. "Back in Time" Released: March 27, 2012; 2. "Get It Started" Released: June 25, 2012; 3. "Don't Stop the Party" Released: September 25, 2012; 4. "Feel This Moment" Released: February 22, 2013

Global Warming is the seventh studio album recorded by Cuban-American rapper Pitbull. It was released on November 16, 2012 through Mr. 305, Polo Grounds and RCA Records. A teaser for the release was first released onto Pitbull's official Facebook and YouTube channel on September 17, 2012. The production on the album was handled by multiple producers including TJR, Afrojack, Sir Nolan, DJ Buddha, Adam Messinger and Nasri. The album also features guest appearances by Christina Aguilera, Usher, Kesha, Chris Brown, Enrique Iglesias, Jennifer Lopez and Shakira among others.

Global Warming was supported by four singles: "Don't Stop the Party", "Get It Started", "Feel This Moment" and "Back in Time" which was the theme to the 2012 film Men In Black 3. The album received generally positive reviews from music critics and was a commercial success. It debuted at number 14 on the US Billboard 200, selling 64,000 copies in its first week. It was also certified double platinum by the Recording Industry Association of America (RIAA) in October 2020.

== Background ==
On October 7, 2011, RCA Music Group announced it was disbanding J Records along with Arista Records and Jive Records. With the shutdown, Pitbull, and all other artists previously signed to these three labels, will instead release future material on the RCA Records brand. In April 2012, it was announced that his seventh studio album would be titled Global Warming. Pitbull announced in May 2012, via Facebook, that the album would be released on November 19, 2012. It was also announced that the lead single from the album would be attached to the Men in Black 3 soundtrack. "Back in Time", which samples "Love Is Strange" by Mickey & Sylvia, was released on March 27, 2012. The second single, "Get It Started" featuring singer Shakira, was released in June 2012. A tour promoting the album in the United States began in August 2012.

In October, Pitbull confirmed that Shakira, Christina Aguilera, Chris Brown, Jennifer Lopez, The Wanted, Enrique Iglesias and Havana Brown would all be featured on the album. The song "Last Night" was originally intended for Paris Hilton, and Nicole Scherzinger had recorded a demo of "Outta Nowhere" in 2012. Complex named the album cover the second worst of 2012. "Feel This Moment" was included in the Emoji Movie score; "Do It" from the Meltdown EP was included in the soundtrack for the movie Step Up: All In.

== Singles ==
The album spawned four singles from its songs. The first single, "Back in Time" was released as the album's lead single on March 27, 2012. The song was released as the main theme from Men in Black 3, appearing over the end credits of the film. The song eventually peaked at number 11 on the US Billboard Hot 100, number 3 in France, number 4 in Canada, number 4 in Australia and number 5 in Germany. The second single, "Get It Started" was released on June 25, 2012. The song features guest vocals from Colombian singer, plus songwriter Shakira. It peaked at number 89 on the US Billboard Hot 100. The third single, "Don't Stop the Party" was released on September 25, 2012. The song contains a sample of the song "Funky Vodka" performed by TJR. The single peaked at number 17 on the US Billboard Hot 100, number seven in the UK and number nine in Canada. The fourth and final single, "Feel This Moment" was released on January 18, 2013. The song features guest vocals from the American recording artist Christina Aguilera. The song features a re-created (not sampled) melody from "Take On Me" performed by A-ha. It eventually peaked at number eight on the US Billboard Hot 100, number one in Spain, number four in Canada, number five in the UK, number six in Australia and number 9 in Germany.

=== Promotional singles ===
"Echa Pa'lla (Manos Pa'rriba)" featuring Papayo was released on July 16, 2012 as the album's first promotional single.

"Outta Nowhere" was released as the album's second promotional single on May 28, 2013. The song features Colombian-American recording artist Danny Mercer. The music video was shot and filmed during July 2013, however, Pitbull decided not to release it.

== Critical reception ==
Professional ratings
Aggregate scores
Source	Rating
Metacritic	63/100
Review scores
Source	Rating
AllMusic	3.5/5 stars
Entertainment Weekly	(A−)
The Lantern	(A−)
Los Angeles Times	2.5/4 stars
Spin	4/10

At Metacritic, which assigns a normalised rating out of 100 to reviews from mainstream critics, it received an average score of 63, based on 8 reviews indicating "Generally favorable reviews". Ray Rahman of Entertainment Weekly gave the album an A− rating stating that the: "highlight may be the Christina Aguilera collab" while also giving a nod to the Havana Brown collaboration "Last Night" as the other "best track". Sam Lansky of the website Idolator stated the music and large range of featured artists are "mostly what fans of his clubby hip-pop have come to expect, so don't be surprised when it's blasting at your local mall for the next year." He noted Pitbull's collaboration with Jennifer Lopez, "Drinks for You (Ladies Anthem)" to be one of the album's stand-out tracks.

== Commercial performance ==
Global Warming debuted at number 14 on the US Billboard 200, selling 64,000 copies in its first week. The album also debuted at number one on the US Top Rap Albums chart. As of December 2013, the album has sold 355,000 copies in the US. On September 19, 2025, the album was certified triple platinum by the Recording Industry Association of America (RIAA) for combined sales and album-equivalent units of over three million units in the United States.

== Track listing ==
Global Warming – Standard edition
No.	Title	Writer(s)	Producer(s)	Length
1.	"Global Warming" (featuring Sensato)	Armando C. Perez; William Reyna; Urales Vargas; Jean-Christoph Ritter; Özgur Yelmen; Antonio Monge; Rafael Ruiz	Bass ill Euro; Perez; DJ Buddha	1:25
2.	"Don't Stop the Party" (featuring TJR)	Perez; TJ Rozdilsky; José García; Jorge Gomez Martinez; Warwick Lyn; Frederick Hibbert	TJR; Chris Lake^{[a]}	3:26
3.	"Feel This Moment" (featuring Christina Aguilera)	Perez; Nasri Atweh; Adam Messinger; Nolan Lambroza; Vargas; Christina Aguilera; Pal Waaktaar; Morten Harket; Magne Furuholmen	Messinger; Nasri; Sir Nolan; DJ Buddha	3:49
4.	"Back in Time" (featured in Men in Black 3)	Perez; Vargas; Marc Kinchen; Adrian Trejo; Ralph Thane; Mickey Baker; Sylvia Robinson; Ellas McDaniel	Kinchen; DJ Spydr; DJ Big Syphe; DJ Buddha	3:27
5.	"Hope We Meet Again" (featuring Chris Brown)	Perez; Atweh; Messinger; Lambroza; Vargas; Chris Brown	Messinger; Nasri; Sir Nolan	3:41
6.	"Party Ain't Over" (featuring Usher and Afrojack)	Perez; Jamal Jones; Nick van de Wall; Usher Raymond IV; Vargas; Earl Hayes	Polow da Don; Afrojack; DJ Buddha	4:03
7.	"Drinks for You (Ladies Anthem)" (featuring Jennifer Lopez)	Perez; Jennifer Lopez; Daniel Woodis; Vargas; Monica Rustgi	DJ Class; DJ Buddha	3:16
8.	"Have Some Fun" (featuring The Wanted and Afrojack)	Perez; van de Wall; Vargas; Daniel Murcia; David Baerwald; Bill Bottrell; Wyn Cooper; Sheryl Crow; Kevin Gilbert	Afrojack; DJ Buddha	4:04
9.	"Outta Nowhere" (featuring Danny Mercer)	Perez; Murcia; Huy	Danny Mercer	4:53
10.	"Tchu Tchu Tcha" (featuring Enrique Iglesias)	Perez; Raphaël Judrin; Pierre-Antoine Melki; Enrique Iglesias; Shylton Fernandes	soFLY & Nius	3:25
11.	"Last Night" (featuring Havana Brown and Afrojack)	Perez; van de Wall; Vargas; Anthony Preston	Afrojack; DJ Buddha	3:39
12.	"I'm Off That" (featuring Afrojack)	Perez; van de Wall; RL Grime; Vargas; Trejo; Martinez; García; Frank Rodriguez	RL Grime; Perez; Van de Wall	3:17
Total length:				40:58

Global Warming – Deluxe edition (bonus tracks)
No.	Title	Writer(s)	Producer(s)	Length
13.	"Echa Pa'lla (Manos Pa'rriba)" (featuring Papayo)	Perez; Gregor Salto; Manuel Corrao; Vargas; Tzvetin Todorov	Salto; Todorov; DJ Buddha	3:16
14.	"Everybody Fucks" (featuring Akon and David Rush)	Perez; Salto; Murcia; Jencarlos Canela; Aliaune Thaim; Vargas; Todorov; Kizzo	Salto; Todorov; DJ Buddha	4:17
15.	"Get It Started" (featuring Shakira)	Perez; Durrell Babbs; Vargas; Sidney Samson; Kinchen; Bigram Zayas; Shakira; Kris Stephens	Samson; Kinchen; DVLP; DJ Buddha	4:05
16.	"11:59" (featuring Vein)	Perez; Gravriel Aminov	Vein	3:37
Total length:				56:13

Global Warming – International deluxe edition (bonus disc)
No.	Title	Writer(s)	Producer(s)	Length
1.	"Rain Over Me" (featuring Marc Anthony)	Pérez; RedOne; Marc Anthony; Bilal "The Chef" Hajji; AJ Janussi; Rachid Aziz	RedOne; David Rush; Jimmy Joker	3:52
2.	"International Love" (featuring Chris Brown)	Pérez; Carsten Shack; Peter Biker; Sean Hurley; Claude Kelly	Soulshock & Biker; Sean Hurley	3:49
3.	"Hotel Room Service"	John Reid; Marc Kinchen; Mark Ross; David Hobbs; Nile Rodgers; Hugh Brankin; Perez; Graham Wilson; Ross Campbell; James Scheffer; Bernard Edwards; Luther Campbell; Christopher Wongwon	Jim Jonsin	3:59
4.	"Give Me Everything" (featuring Ne-Yo, Afrojack and Nayer)	Pérez; van de Wall; Shaffer Smith	Afrojack	4:16
5.	"Hey Baby (Drop It to the Floor)" (featuring T-Pain)	Pérez; Faheem Najm; Sandy Wilhelm	Sandy Vee	3:56
6.	"DJ Got Us Fallin' in Love" (Usher featuring Pitbull)	Max Martin; Shellback; Savan Kotecha; Pérez	Max Martin, Shellback	3:42
7.	"Dance Again" (Jennifer Lopez featuring Pitbull)	RedOne; Enrique Iglesias; Bilal "The Chef"; AJ Junior; Pérez	RedOne	3:57
Total length:				27:29

Global Warming: Meltdown – (bonus tracks)
No.	Title	Writer(s)	Producer(s)	Length
13.	"Timber" (featuring Kesha)	Perez; Kesha Sebert; Lukasz Gottwald; Priscilla Hamilton; Jamie Sanderson; Stanley Isaac; Henry Walter; Pebe Sebert; Lee Oskar; Keri Oskar; Greg Errico	Dr. Luke; Cirkut; Sermstyle; Nick Seeley	3:24
14.	"That High" (featuring Kelly Rowland)	Perez; Mikkel S. Eriksen; Tor Hermansen; Benjamin Levin; Shellback; Ester Dean	Stargate; Benny Blanco	3:14
15.	"Do It" (featuring Mayer Hawthorne)	Perez; Jacob Dutton; Andrew Cohen; Omar Tavarez; Samuel Wishkoski	Tuxedo	3:40
16.	"Sun in California" (featuring Mohombi and PLAYB4CK)	Perez; Ivar Lisinski; Mohombi Moupondo; Olle Olmås; Bruno Lopez	Lisinski; Olmås	3:00
17.	"All the Things" (featuring Inna)	Perez; Burns; Calvin Harris; Bebe Black	Burns; Calvin Harris; Sean Combs	3:25
Total length:				57:41

Notes

- ^{^[a]} signifies an additional producer
- ^{^[b]} signifies a co-producer
- The clean version of "Tchu Tchu Tcha" is used for the explicit version of Global Warming on iTunes.
- There is another version of "Outta Nowhere" featuring a verse from Jamie Drastik, a New York emcee who is a protégé and former artist of Pitbull.

Sample credits

- "Global Warming" contains a portion of the composition from "Macarena" written by Antonio Monge and Rafael Ruiz.
- "Don't Stop the Party" contains a sample from "Funky Kingston" written by Frederick Hibbert, as performed by Toots & The Maytals.
- "Feel This Moment" contains a portion of the composition "Take On Me", written by Pål Waaktaar, Morten Harket, and Magne Furuholmen, as performed by A-ha.
- "Back in Time" contains a sample from "Love is Strange", written by Mickey Baker, Sylvia Robinson, and Ellas McDaniel, as performed by Mickey & Sylvia.
- "Have Some Fun" contains a portion of the composition "All I Wanna Do", written by David Baerwald, Bill Bottrell, Wyn Cooper, Sheryl Crow, and Kevin Gilbert, as performed by Sheryl Crow.
- "Tchu Tchu Tcha" contains a portion of the composition "Eu Quero Tchu, Eu Quero Tcha", written by Shylton Fernandes, as performed by João Lucas & Marcelo.
- "I'm Off That" contains a sample from "Pacha on Acid", written by Nick van de Wall, as performed by Afrojack.
- "Timber" contains a portion of the composition "San Francisco Bay", written by Lee Oskar, Keri Oskar, and Greg Errico; as well as a sample of one of Pitbull's own songs, "11:59" featuring Vein.

== Charts ==
=== Weekly charts ===
Chart (2012)	Peak position
Australian Albums (ARIA)	14
Austrian Albums (Ö3 Austria)	12
Belgian Albums (Ultratop Flanders)	46
Belgian Albums (Ultratop Wallonia)	43
Canadian Albums (Billboard)	12
Dutch Albums (Album Top 100)	89
French Albums (SNEP)	43
German Albums (Offizielle Top 100)	21
Hungarian Albums (MAHASZ)	31
Irish Albums (IRMA)	59
Italian Albums (FIMI)	54
New Zealand Albums (RMNZ)	38
Spanish Albums (Promusicae)	38
Swedish Albums (Sverigetopplistan)	54
Swiss Albums (Schweizer Hitparade)	15
Taiwanese Albums (Five-Music)	13
US Billboard 200	14
US Top Rap Albums (Billboard)	1

Chart (2025–2026)	Peak position
Lithuanian Albums (AGATA)	26
Norwegian Albums (VG-lista)	36

=== Year-end charts ===
Chart (2013)	Position
Canadian Albums (Billboard)	49
US Billboard 200	78
US Top Rap Albums (Billboard)	13

== Certifications ==
Region	Certification	Certified units/sales
Australia (ARIA) Global Warming: Meltdown	Gold	35,000^{^}
Canada (Music Canada)	Platinum	80,000^{^}
Denmark (IFPI Danmark)	Platinum	20,000^{‡}
Germany (BVMI)	Gold	100,000^{‡}
Hungary (MAHASZ)	2× Platinum	12,000^{‡}
Italy (FIMI)	Gold	25,000^{‡}
Mexico (AMPROFON)	Platinum	60,000^{‡}
New Zealand (RMNZ) Global Warming: Meltdown	2× Platinum	30,000^{‡}
Poland (ZPAV) Global Warming: Meltdown	Platinum	20,000^{*}
Sweden (GLF)	Gold	20,000^{‡}
United Kingdom (BPI)	Gold	100,000^{‡}
United States (RIAA)	3× Platinum	3,000,000^{‡}
^{*} Sales figures based on certification alone.^{^} Shipments figures based on certification alone.^{‡} Sales+streaming figures based on certification alone.

== Release history ==
Region	Date	Label(s)	Formats
Germany	November 16, 2012	Sony Music	Digital download, CD
United States	November 19, 2012	RCA Records	Digital download, CD, LP
United Kingdom	December 3, 2012	RCA Records	Digital download, CD, LP
