= Dançando =

Single by Ivete Sangalo featuring Shakira

from the album Real Fantasia
- Released: 16 January 2013
- Recorded: September 2012
- Genre: Axé; latin pop
- Length: 3:16
- Label: Universal
- Songwriters: Dan Kambaiah; Davi Salles; Shakira Ripoll; Joel Antonio López Castro
- Producer: Alexandre Lins

Ivete Sangalo singles chronology
"No Brilho Desse Olhar" (2012)	"Dançando" (2013)	"Vejo o Sol e a Lua" (2013)

Shakira singles chronology
"Get It Started" (2012)	"Dançando" (2013)	"Can't Remember to Forget You" (2014)

Music video
- "Dançando" on YouTube

"Dançando" is a song by the Brazilian recording artist Ivete Sangalo from her seventh studio album Real Fantasia. The song, composed by Dan Kambaiah and Davi Salles, was released as second single of the album on 16 January 2013. A second version featuring the Colombian singer Shakira, was released on 30 January 2013. However, the duet does not integrate the album in the physical version, because the authorization for the commercialization of the recording did not arrive in a timely manner for the insertion of the duet in the physical edition of the disc. Once authorized, the recording was used by Universal Music as "bonus track" in the digital version of the album.

"Dançando" is the first Brazilian song to be placed on the Just Dance 2014 track list, the fifth game in the Just Dance series, developed by Ubisoft.

== Background and release ==
In August 2012, it was announced that Ivete Sangalo would record a song by the singer of Psycho, Márcio Victor, on his next CD, Real Fantasia. According to the columnist Telma Alvarenga of Correio da Bahia newspaper, Ivete recorded a song composed by his friend in partnership with Filipe Escandurras and Tierry. According to the note, the leader of the Psycho would already be, including recording the percussive part of the song, which is initially called "Dançando". Soon after, it was announced that the song was part of the album.

On 7 November the song won its first television appearance on the TV show Domingão do Faustão, along with six other songs from the album. On 7 November was the talk show Agora É Tarde, by Danilo Gentili, where Ivete went through an interview and finished singing "Dead Skin Mask" by progressive rock band Slayer. Ivete played the track on Caldeirão do Huck show on 10 November, where she talked about the music video for the song, which would not have featured Shakira, thus contradicting the rumors. At the time the singer also presented the first single, "No Brilho Desse Olhar". The next day, 11 November, the song was also featured on the TV show Eliana, by the host with the same name. On 17 November, Ivete was in the TV show Legendários, by Marcos Mion, also playing several other songs from the album. On 22 November, she was in the Programa do Jô for the song's release. On 24 November it was the turn of the program TV Xuxa to receive a presentation of the song.

The singer also recorded the program O Melhor do Brasil, with Rodrigo Faro, for the 22 December special, playing the track along with "Easy". Finishing the marathon of dissemination of the song of the year of 2012 Ivete presented it in the traditional Show da Virada. In addition Sangalo also recorded the song for the Mais Você, Adriane Galisteu program that was canceled and had the video never released, and for the Programa Raul Gil, which was not shown in 2012.

== Reception ==
=== Critical ===
The song received mixed reviews. Yhuru Nukui from the Dressing Room was positive, saying "The song has a simple composition, a very Latin arrangement, and promises to make carnival lovers dance until the sun rises. If the Colombian singer sang in Spanish, the music could even be released in Latin America - maybe, from the sides of Europe and North America - but it only rages in Portuguese and should stay here for Brazil itself." For Julio César Biar of the DiverCidade website, "the incredible verses of 'Dançando', like 'O ritmo me consome/ Vive em meu abdômen', sound embarrassing even to those who are accustomed to having the crowd take their feet off the ground in their enthusiastic presentations."

Deivson Prescovia of Audiogram said that the song "disappoints," pointing out that "The lyrics are weak and meaningless (Mamãe vai fazer, papai vai fazer/Dançando, dançando, dançando/Dan, dan, dan, dan, dan, dançando)," Comparing it to songs from É o Tchan!. Even so, he praised the melody of the song, saying that it "should be praised for the simple fact that we do not have the (damn) timbau and the like, showing well one of the most striking features of Real Fantasia: chewing gum songs."

== Music video ==
On 28 November 2012, Ivete announced that she would record the video of the song live two days later, on 30 November, during the premiere of the Real Fantasia tour. At the time the singer also stated that the song would bring a choreography originally created for the track, bringing back this famous artifice at the beginning of his career. It was speculated that Ivete would record a video clip in studio for the version with Shakira of the song, but soon was denied by the singer during the tv show Caldeirão do Huck.

== Credits and personnel ==
Personnel

- Ivete Sangalo – vocals
- Shakira – vocals and composer
- Joel Antonio López Castro – composer
- Dan Kambaiah – composer
- Davi Salles – composer
- Alexandre Lins – producer

== Charts ==
Chart (2012/13)	Peak position
Billboard (Brasil Hot 100 Airplay)	16
Billboard (Brasil Regional Recife Hot Songs)	1
Billboard (Brasil Regional Salvador Hot Songs)	1
