= Pause (Pitbull song) =

Promotional single by Pitbull

from the album Planet Pit
- Released: June 7, 2011
- Genre: Hip hop; EDM
- Length: 3:01
- Label: Polo Grounds; J; RCA; Mr. 305
- Songwriters: Armando C. Perez; Adrian Santalla; Abdesamad Ben Abdelouahid; Ari Affect Kalimi; Urales Vargas
- Producers: Drop; Affect; DJ Buddha

"Pause" is a song from American rapper Pitbull's sixth studio album, Planet Pit. The song was written by Armando C. Perez, Adrian Santalla, Abdesamad Ben Abdelouahid, Ari Affect Kalimi and Urales Vargas, and it was produced by DJ Buddha. The song peaked at number 33 on the New Zealand Singles Chart.

"Pause" was used to promote the Zumba fitness program. It is also the theme song of the video game Zumba Fitness 2.

== Track listing ==
- Album version
1. "Pause" – 3:01
- Single version
1. "Pause (Zumba Mix)" – 3:00

== Credits and personnel ==
- Lead vocals – Pitbull
- Producers – Dj Buddha
- Lyrics – Armando C. Perez, Adrian Santalla, Abdesamad Ben Abdelouahid, Ari Kalimi, Urales Vargas
- Label: Polo Grounds, J Records, RCA Records, Mr. 305

== In other media ==
- The song was played in the 2014 DreamWorks Animation film Mr. Peabody & Sherman

== Charts ==
Chart (2011)	Peak position
Austria (Ö3 Austria Top 40)	73
Canada (Canadian Hot 100)	44
New Zealand (Recorded Music NZ)	33
Spain (Promusicae)	42
US Billboard Hot 100	73

== Certifications ==
Region	Certification	Certified units/sales
United States (RIAA)	Gold	500,000^{‡}
^{‡} Sales+streaming figures based on certification alone.
