= Shake Señora =

Promotional single by Pitbull featuring T-Pain and Sean Paul

from the album Planet Pit
- Released: August 8, 2011
- Recorded: 2010
- Genre: Pop rap; reggae fusion; electro; calypso
- Length: 3:34 (album version); 4:12 (remix featuring Ludacris)
- Label: Polo Grounds; J; RCA; Mr. 305
- Songwriter(s): Faheem Najm; Sean Paul Henriques; William Grigahcine; Steve Samuel; Gabriel Oller; Ralph de Leon; Clinton Sparks; Harry Belafonte
- Producer(s): Clinton Sparks; DJ Snake

Deluxe version remix single cover

"Shake Señora" is a song by American rapper Pitbull from his sixth studio album Planet Pit (2011). The song features vocals from American singer T-Pain and Jamaican dancehall musician Sean Paul, and was produced by Clinton Sparks and DJ Snake. "Shake Señora" heavily samples "Jump in the Line (Shake, Senora)", composed in 1946 by Lord Kitchener and popularized in 1961 by Harry Belafonte. It was released as a digital single in July 2011 and subsequently peaked at number 69 on the Billboard Hot 100. A remix of the song featuring fellow American rapper Ludacris was also released. The song was featured in the official trailer for Hotel Transylvania 3: Summer Vacation.

== Track listing ==
- Album version
1. "Shake Señora" (featuring T-Pain and Sean Paul) (Original Version) – 3:34
2. "Shake Señora" (featuring T-Pain, Sean Paul and Ludacris) (Original Remix) – 4:12

== Credits and personnel ==
Credits adapted from Planet Pit album liner notes.

- Harry Belafonte – songwriting ("Jump in the Line" sample)
- Ralph de Leon – songwriting
- William Grigahcine – songwriting
- Sean Paul Henriques – lead vocals, songwriting
- Faheem Najm – lead vocals, songwriting
- Gabriel Oller – songwriting
- Armando C. Perez – lead vocals, songwriting
- Steve Samuel – songwriting
- Clinton Sparks – production, songwriting

== Charts ==
Chart (2011–12)	Peak position
Belgium (Ultratip Bubbling Under Flanders)	48
Canada (Canadian Hot 100)	33
Canada CHR/Top 40 (Billboard)	46
New Zealand (Recorded Music NZ)	40
US Billboard Hot 100	69
US Hot Latin Songs (Billboard)	42
US Latin Pop Airplay (Billboard)	17

== Certifications ==
Region	Certification	Certified units/sales
New Zealand (RMNZ)	Gold	15,000^{‡}
United States (RIAA)	Platinum	1,000,000^{‡}
^{‡} Sales+streaming figures based on certification alone.
