= Back in Time (Pitbull song) =

Single by Pitbull

from the album Global Warming
- Released: March 27, 2012
- Recorded: 2011
- Genre: Dance; dubstep
- Length: 3:25
- Label: Polo Grounds; RCA; Mr. 305
- Songwriters: Armando C. Pérez; Urales Vargas; Marc Kinchen; Big Syphe; Mickey Baker; Sylvia Robinson; Ellas McDaniel
- Producers: Marc Kinchen; Big Syphe; DJ Buddha

Pitbull singles chronology
"I Like (The Remix)" (2012)	"Back in Time" (2012)	"Dance Again" (2012)

Men in Black singles chronology
"Black Suits Comin' (Nod Ya Head)" (2002)	"Back in Time" (2012)

Music video
- "Back in Time" on YouTube

"Back in Time" is a song by the American rapper Pitbull. While originally released as the lead single from the soundtrack of sci-fi film Men in Black 3, it is not featured on the album. Instead, it was released as the lead single from Pitbull's seventh studio album, Global Warming. The single was released via download on March 27, 2012, before being issued physically in Germany on May 25.

The song contains a sample from "Love Is Strange", written by Mickey Baker, Sylvia Robinson, and Ellas McDaniel, as performed by Mickey & Sylvia. The single was a commercial success, peaking at number 11 on the US Billboard Hot 100. To date, it has sold over 1.3 million copies digitally in the US. The single was also successful outside of the US, peaking at number one in Austria, Honduras and Poland, and within the top ten in Australia, Belgium, Canada, France, Germany, Hungary, New Zealand and Switzerland.

Remixes of this song were released by R3hab, Play-N-Skillz, Quintino, Gregor Salto and Alvaro.

== Music video ==
The music video begins with Pitbull in a locked room when a girl named Barbara Alba (his girlfriend at the time) comes in and frees him. They have dinner at a restaurant (based on the scenes in the movie). Then, an alien attacks the restaurant and the girl shoots the alien with her gun and she and Pitbull leave the restaurant. The video switches back and forth with Pitbull and his girlfriend at a party to the clips of the film. Pitbull uses the Neuralyzer to end the video with the sign "PIT/MIB".

The clip is available on the DVD and Blu-ray releases of the film. Madai also appeared in this video. As of 2024, the video has received over 63 million views on YouTube.

== Chart performance ==
The single debuted at number 79 on the US Billboard Hot 100, on the week of April 14, 2012. In the following week, the song fell off the chart. Two weeks later, the song re-entered the chart at number 83, on the week of April 28. After climbing the chart for seven more weeks, the single reached its peak at number 11 on the chart dated June 16. As of August 2012, the single had sold over 1.3 million copies digitally. On October 16, 2020, the single was certified double platinum by the Recording Industry Association of America (RIAA) for combined sales and streaming equivalent units of over two million units in the United States.

== Track listing ==
- Download
1. "Back in Time" – 3:27
2. "Back in Time" (Single Version) – 3:25
- CD single
1. "Back in Time" – 3:25
2. "Back in Time" (Extended Mix) – 3:41

== Charts ==
=== Weekly charts ===
Chart (2012–2013)	Peak position
Australia (ARIA)	4
Austria (Ö3 Austria Top 40)	1
Belgium (Ultratop 50 Flanders)	8
Belgium Dance (Ultratop Flanders)	5
Belgium Urban (Ultratop Flanders)	17
Belgium (Ultratop 50 Wallonia)	9
Belgium Dance (Ultratop Wallonia)	3
Canada (Canadian Hot 100)	4
Canada CHR/Top 40 (Billboard)	5
Czech Republic Airplay (ČNS IFPI)	2
Denmark (Tracklisten)	21
Finland (Suomen virallinen latauslista)	21
France (SNEP)	3
Germany (GfK)	5
Global Dance Tracks (Billboard)	1
Honduras (Honduras Top 50)	1
Hungary (Dance Top 40)	2
Hungary (Rádiós Top 40)	6
Ireland (IRMA)	15
Japan Hot 100 (Billboard)	18
Luxembourg Digital Songs (Billboard)	1
Mexico (Billboard Mexican Airplay)	41
Mexico Anglo (Monitor Latino)	13
Netherlands (Single Top 100)	84
New Zealand (Recorded Music NZ)	10
Romania (Romanian Top 100)	15
Poland Airplay (ZPAV)	1
Poland (Video Chart)	1
Spain (Promusicae)	35
Switzerland (Schweizer Hitparade)	6
UK Singles (Official Charts)	21
UK Hip Hop/R&B (Official Charts)	5
Ukraine Airplay (TopHit)	91
US Billboard Hot 100	11
US Dance Airplay (Billboard)	16
US Hot Latin Songs (Billboard)	26
US Hot Rap Songs (Billboard)	20
US Pop Airplay (Billboard)	14
US Rhythmic Airplay (Billboard)	14

=== Year-end charts ===
Chart (2012)	Position
Australia (ARIA)	39
Austria (Ö3 Austria Top 40)	4
Belgium (Ultratop 50 Flanders)	53
Belgium Dance (Ultratop Flanders)	39
Belgium (Ultratop 50 Wallonia)	31
Belgium Dance (Ultratop Wallonia)	18
Brazil (Crowley)	88
Canada (Canadian Hot 100)	32
France (SNEP)	19
Germany (Media Control AG)	24
Hungary (Rádiós Top 40)	27
Switzerland (Schweizer Hitparade)	30
Ukraine Airplay (TopHit)	122
UK Singles (Official Charts Company)	200
US Billboard Hot 100	62
US Billboard Digital Songs	60

=== All-time charts ===
Chart	Position
Switzerland (Schweizer Hitparade)	795

== Certifications ==
Region	Certification	Certified units/sales
Australia (ARIA)	3× Platinum	210,000^{^}
Austria (IFPI Austria)	Platinum	30,000^{*}
Canada (Music Canada)	4× Platinum	320,000^{*}
Germany (BVMI)	Platinum	300,000^{^}
Mexico (AMPROFON)	Platinum+Gold	90,000^{*}
Switzerland (IFPI Switzerland)	Platinum	30,000^{^}
United States (RIAA)	2× Platinum	2,000,000^{‡}
Streaming
Denmark (IFPI Danmark)	Gold	900,000^{†}
^{*} Sales figures based on certification alone.^{^} Shipments figures based on certification alone.^{‡} Sales+streaming figures based on certification alone.^{†} Streaming-only figures based on certification alone.

== Release history ==
Country	Date	Format
Worldwide	March 27, 2012	Digital download
United States	April 3, 2012	Mainstream airplay
Germany	May 25, 2012	CD single
