= TJR (DJ) =

American DJ and music producer (born 1983)

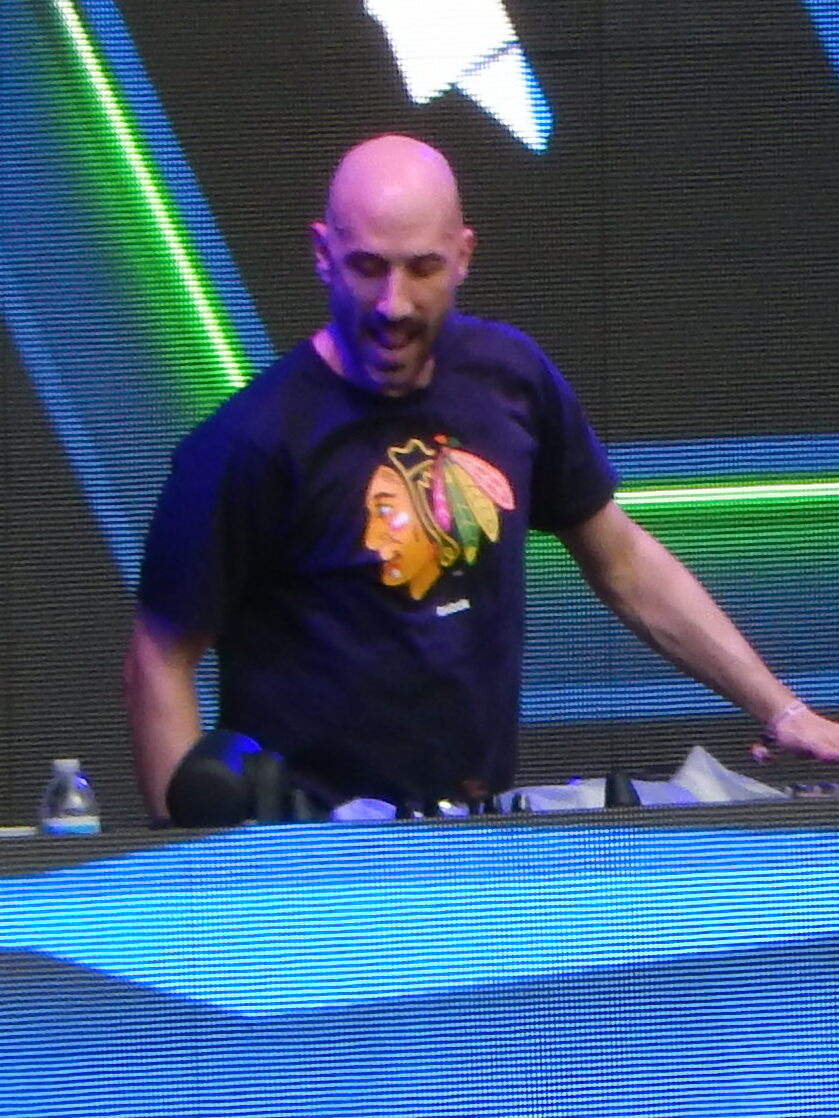
- TJR at the 2015 Spring Awakening Music Festival

Background information
- Also known as: TJ Rozdilsky, Rozski
- Born: Thomas Joseph Rozdilsky; March 15, 1983 (age 43); Danbury, Connecticut, United States
- Genres: Melbourne bounce, electro house, moombahton, Dutch house
- Occupations: Music producer, DJ, remixer, musician
- Instruments: Keyboards, mixer, synthesizer
- Years active: 2005–present
- Labels: Spinnin' Records, Rising Music, Mad Decent, Boysnoize Records
- Website: www.iamtjr.com

Thomas Joseph Rozdilsky (born March 15, 1983), better known as TJR, is an American DJ and music producer.

== Background ==
Thomas Joseph Rozdilsky was born in Danbury, Connecticut. Hesitating between a golfing career or music, TJR decided to become a DJ in 2004 after attending multiple raves. TJR has built a catalogue of original tracks and remixes since arriving on the scene in 2008. He is known for the hits "Ode to Oi" and the certified platinum "Don't Stop the Party" with Pitbull.

== Discography ==
=== Charting singles ===
Year	Title	Peak chart positions												Album
Year	Title	AUS	AUT	BEL (Vl)	BEL (Wa)	FRA	GER	IRL	NLD	SPA	SWI	UK	US	Album
2012	"Don't Stop the Party" (Pitbull featuring TJR)	15	10	22	39	174	23	20	85	16	59	7	17	Global Warming
2013	"Ode to Oi"	—	—	86^{[A]}	—	108	—	—	—	—	—	—	—	Non-album singles
2013	"What's Up Suckaz"	—	—	16^{[B]}	6^{[B]}	—	—	—	—	—	—	—	—	Non-album singles
2014	"Bounce Generation" (with Vinai)	—	—	62^{[A]}	—	—	—	—	—	—	—	—	—	Non-album singles
"—" denotes a recording that did not chart or was not released in that territory.
