= Danny Mercer =

Colombian-American songwriter and producer

Danny Murcia
- Born: Daniel Murcia; Bogotá, Colombia
- Origin: Colombian, naturalized American
- Occupations: Songwriter; record producer; A&R; singer
- Label: Columbia

Danny Mercer (born Daniel Murcia in Bogotá, Colombia) is a Colombian American recording artist, songwriter, and producer. Signed to Columbia Records, Murcia has worked with Afrojack, Akon, Celine Dion, Frankie J, Nicole Scherzinger, Pitbull, The Wanted, and will.i.am.

== Career ==
Mercer was born Daniel Murcia in Bogotá, Colombia, and moved to the US when he was 6 months old. He grew up in Weston, Florida. Having shown an interest for music from an early age, he picked up a guitar at the age of 7 and started writing songs at 14. As a teenager growing up in Fort Lauderdale, Murcia studied with jazz pianist Alex Darqui at Lynn University, who expanded Murcia's musical horizons into jazz and fusion. While a freshman at Columbia University, Murcia began to produce and write songs in their dorm room, eventually sparking the attention of established pop songwriters and producers such as The Messengers and Kara DioGuardi.

Mercer made his commercial songwriting debut in 2012 with the release of Pitbull's Global Warming, to which he contributed several songs including "Have Some Fun" and "Outta Nowhere". In 2013, they penned Frankie J's single "No Te Quiero Ver Con Él", in addition to collaborating with will.i.am and Sandy Vee to write Nicole Scherzinger's comeback single "Boomerang," which debuted at number 6 on the UK charts. They also wrote and co-produced the track "Save Your Soul" on Celine Dion's 2013 album, Loved Me Back to Life. They performed on the television show Katie with Pitbull.

Murcia is currently working on their debut EP in addition to writing for other artists.

On May 31, 2013, Murcia performed live on Good Morning America with Pitbull, and again on June 17, 2013, on The Tonight Show.
