= DJ Buddha =

American DJ and record producer

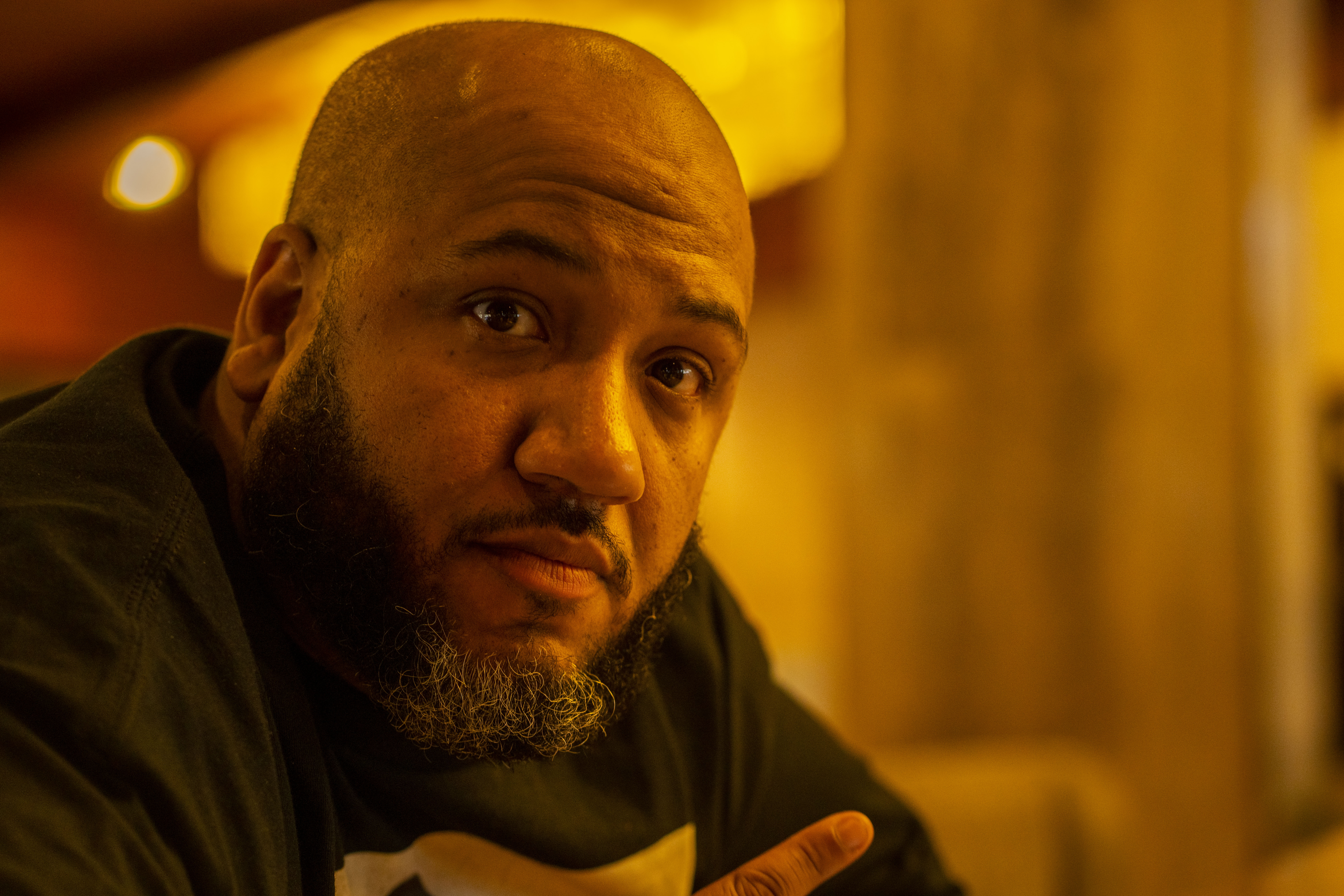

Background information
- Born: Urales Vargas; March 15, 1980 (age 46)
- Genres: Hip hop; house; dancehall; reggae; soca; Latin; merengue; reggaeton; bachata
- Occupations: Disc jockey; record producer; songwriter; A&R; music publisher; radio personality; record executive
- Instruments: Turntables; drum machine; Logic Pro X; Pro Tools; Ableton Live
- Label: Therapist Music

Urales Vargas (born March 15, 1980), known professionally as DJ Buddha, is an American DJ, record producer, radio personality, music publisher, and record executive from Lawrence, Massachusetts.

== Career ==
DJ Buddha has been associated with the team La Favela in the form of a mixtape and a movement called "Caribbean Connection", which delivered a mix of dancehall reggae and reggaetón. Along with the "Caribbean Connection" and "Tropical Heat" series, he has created hundreds of mixtapes which were critically acclaimed. DJ Buddha has also recently released a mix album titled Ultra.Latino which hit #2 on iTunes Latin within the 1st week of its release date.

== Collaborations ==
DJ Buddha has worked alongside reggae artist Mighty Mystic and has created records and collaborated with other reggae artists such as Mr. Easy, Tantro Metro & Devonte, Mr. Vegas, Red Rat, and T.O.K., the latter of whom he worked with as their official DJ for roughly six years. While on the road with T.O.K., Buddha created the remix for "Gal Yuh A Lead", featuring T.O.K., Beenie Man, & Nina Sky, which was one of his first songs to gain major airplay. He also created two different promotional mixtape samplers of T.O.K and Lady Saw for reggae indie label VP Records.

He has worked on remixes with other artists like Pitbull, Daddy Yankee, Machel Montano, Lil Jon, N.O.R.E., etc. In 2004 Daddy Yankee's "Gasolina" was remixed by DJ Buddha, featuring Cuban-American rapper, Pitbull and N.O.R.E., and first appeared on Caribbean Connection Volume 2. Later that summer, Lil Jon mixed his own vocals to the remix, which was featured on his Crunk Juice album. In 2005 he teamed up with Pitbull again on "She's Hotter Remix" featuring T.O.K. He later became Pitbull's official DJ and joined him on the road for the next six years.

Buddha has been a part of the 25th anniversary of Michael Jackson's Bad album, doing the 2012 edit of "Bad" with Afrojack & Pitbull. He also co-produced with Marc Kinchen & Big Syphe the theme song for the Men In Black 3 film, titled "Back In Time". In 2013, Buddha won a Grammy award for his work on the song "Echa Pa'lla (Manos Pa'rriba)".

== In recent years ==
In 2012, Buddha started a record label (Therapist Music) & publishing company (Therapist Music Publishing). He was inducted into the Boys & Girls Club of Lawrence (Mass.) Alumni Hall of Fame on Nov. 19, 2015.

In 2016, he was credited as a music supervisor on Nick Cannon’s feature King of the Dancehall (premiered at TIFF 2016).

In 2025, Buddha was nominated for a Premio Lo Nuestro 2025 37th Crossover Collaboration of the Year & 2 nominations at 2025 Premios Juventud 2025 nominations for Mejor Dance Track & Tropical Mix.

== Discography ==
Mixtape

- Tropical Heat Vol. 1 – Vol. 25 (Dancehall, Reggae & Soca)
- Caribbean Connection Vol. 1 – Vol. 7 (Dancehall Meets Reggaeton)
- Pitbull : Free Agent
- International Takeover: The United Nations
- Mr. Worldwide

Tracks (produced, written or remixed)

- Afrojack - Faded
- Afrojack Ft. Ally Brooke - All Night
- Afrojack Ft. Chris Brown - As Your Friend
- Afrojack Ft. Matthew Koma - Keep Our Love Alive
- Afrojack Ft. Shirazi - Mexico
- Afrojack Ft. Snoop Dogg - Dynamite
- Afrojack Ft. Sting - Catch Tomorrow
- Afrojack Ft. Ty Dolla $ign - Gone
- Afrojack Ft. Tyler Glenn - Born To Run
- Afrojack Ft. Wiz Khalifa and Kevin Cruise - Too Wild
- Alcover, Jhoni The Voice & Joell - Bomba
- Alcover Ft. Nachho - Menu
- Ally Brooke x Matoma - Higher
- Ally Brooke Ft. Afrojack - What Are We Waiting For?
- Amanda Reifer - Give Way
- Amara La Negra - Now That You're Gone
- Amara La Negra - Tare
- Amara La Negra Ft. Messiah - Celebra
- Anahí Ft. Zuzuka Poderosa- Boom Cha
- Ananya Birla - Disappear
- Ananya Birla Ft. WurlD & Vector - Blackout
- Angela Hunte - Big Drum Beat
- Angela Hunte - Love Me Some Him
- Angela Hunte - Make Me Go
- Angela Hunte - Me
- Angela Hunte - Mon Bon Ami
- Angela Hunte & Machel Montano - Party Done
- Angela Hunte & Machel Montano Ft. Gregor Salto & Dj Buddha - Like So
- Arianna Ft. Pitbull - Sexy People (The Sexy Song)
- Baha Men - Let's Go
- Beatriz Luengo Ft. Shaggy - Lengua
- Becky G Ft. Pitbull - Can't Get Enough
- Blaiz Fayah & Tribal Kush Ft. Randy Nota Loca & Kafu Banton - Bad (Latin Remix)
- Bright Lights Ft. Fito Blanko - Gringa
- C. Tangana Ft.Cromo X - Traicionero
- Cezar Ft. Sizzla - Morning In Gideon (Remix)
- Chris Brown Ft. Jhené Aiko & R. Kelly - Juicy Booty
- Christian Alicea - Aroma
- Christian Alicea - Corbarde
- Christian Alicea - El Swing
- Christian Alicea - Hello, What's Up
- Christian Alicea - Me Lo Gozo
- Christian Alicea - Sube Tela
- Christian Alicea - Vuelve
- Christian Alicea Ft. Jowell y Randy & Dj Buddha - Carrusel
- Christian Alicea Ft. Luis Figueroa, Luis Vazquez & Moa Rivera - El Swing 2.0
- Cierra Ramirez Ft. Bulova - Charlie
- Clinton Sparks Ft. T.I.- UV Love
- Daddy Yankee Ft. Pitbull, N.O.R.E. & Lil Jon – Gasolina (Dj Buddha Remix)
- Dj Buddha x Angela Hunte - Speaker
- Dj Buddha Ft. Christian Alicea - Que Rica
- Dj Buddha Ft. Munga - WAAR
- Dj Buddha, Cutty Ranks & Shermanology Ft. Steve Andreas - Money House
- Dj Delano & Dj Buddha Ft. Beenie Man - The Keys (Steve Andreas Mix)
- Dj Nelson - Que Pasa Aqui
- Dj Nelson & Alejandro Armes Ft. Christian Alicea - Se Le Nota
- Dyland & Lenny Ft. Pitbull & Beatriz Luengo - Sin Ti (Don't Want To Miss a Thing)
- Frankie J Ft. Pitbull - Beautiful
- Jason Derulo Ft. Pitbull - Fire
- Juan Magan Ft. Pitbull & El Cata - Bailando Por El Mundo (2013 Latin Grammy Nomination)
- Kreesha Turner Ft. T.O.K - Sexy Gal
- Kirstin Maldonado - Bad Weather
- Leikeli47 - Bubble Gum
- Lil Jon Ft. Daddy Yankee & Pitbull – What U Gon' Do (Latino Remix)
- Machel Montano & Pitbull - Defense
- Machel Montano - Human
- Mad Skillz - In A Minute
- Maffio, Angela Hunte & DJ Buddha - Ella Baila
- Maffio Ft. Ky-Mani Marley, Veronica Vega & Itawe - Loco Con Ella
- Maffio Ft. Nicky Jam & Akon - Uchi Walla
- Mariel Jacoda - insodeep
- Michael Jackson Ft. Pitbull - Bad (Afrojack Remix) [DJ Buddha Edit]
- Michel Telo & Pitbull - Ai Se Eu Te Pego (If I Get Ya) (Worldwide Remix)
- Mohombi - Turn It Up
- Mohombi Ft. Machel Montano & Pitbull - Bumpy Ride (Soca Remix)
- Mx Prime Ft. Dj Buddha - Turn On
- Nick Cannon - Looking For a Dream
- Nick Cannon - F n Awesome
- Nick Cannon Ft. DJ Class & FatMan Scoop - F*** Your Birthday
- Nick Cannon Ft. Polow Da Don & Amba Shepherd - OJ
- Olga Tañon Ft. Christian Alicea - Vamos A Ser Feliz
- OYE!!! Ft. Angela Hunte - Voices
- OYE!!! & Kassiano Ft. Craigy-T & Gregor Salto - Keep Calm
- OYE!!! & Kassiano Ft. Angela Hunte & Cutty Ranks - Stay Down Low
- Paris Hilton - Good Time
- Patoranking - Temperature
- Paulina Rubio Ft. Pitbull - Ni Rosas Ni Juguetes (Remix)
- Pee Wee - Oh Donna (Come Back To Me)
- Pitbull - Back in Time
- Pitbull - Maldito Alcohol
- Pitbull - Pause
- Pitbull, Ne-Yo & Afrojack Ft. Dj Buddha - 2 The Moon
- Pitbull Ft. Akon & David Rush - Everybody Fucks
- Pitbull Ft. Christina Aguilera - Feel This Moment
- Pitbull Ft. Don Omar - Fuego (Dj Buddha Remix) (as appeared on Madden NFL 08)
- Pitbull Ft. Enrique Iglesias & Afrojack - I Like - The Remix
- Pitbull Ft. Havana Brown & Afrojack - Last Night (Never Happen)
- Pitbull Ft. Jennifer Lopez - Drinks for You (Ladies Anthem)
- Pitbull Ft. Lil Jon, Mr. Vegas, Wayne Marshall, Red Rat, T.O.K & Kardinal Offishall – Toma (Dj Buddha Remix)
- Pitbull Ft. Lil Jon, Sensato, Black Point & El Cata - Watagatapitusberry Remix
- Pitbull Ft. Machel Montano - Alright
- Pitbull Ft. Ne-Yo, Nayer & Afrojack - Give Me Everything
- Pitbull Ft. Papayo - Echa Pa'lla (Manos Pa'rriba) (Grammy Nomination)'(Grammy Winner)'
- Pitbull Ft. Sensato - Global Warming Intro
- Pitbull Ft. Shakira - Get It Started
- Pitbull Ft. Usher & Afrojack - Party Ain't Over
- Pitbull Ft. Vein, David Rush & RedFoo of LMFAO - Took My Love
- Pitbull Ft. The Wanted & Afrojack - Have Some Fun
- Quincy - Aye Yo
- Quincy Ft. Shaggy & Patoranking - Aye Yo (Dj Buddha Remix)
- Rupee Ft. Daddy Yankee – Tempted To Touch (RMX)
- Samantha J Ft. Dej Loaf- League Of My Own
- Sensato Ft. Pitbull & Sak Noel - Crazy People (Grammy Nomination)
- T.O.K Ft. Pitbull – She's Hotter
- Veronica Vega Ft. Lil Wayne & Jeremih - Wave
- Veronica Vega Ft. Pitbull - Wicked
- Will.I.Am Ft. Afrojack - Hello
- 3Ball MTY Ft. Becky G- Quiero Bailar
- 3Ball MTY Ft. Cowboy Troy- Vaquero Electro

Albums (appeared on or produced)

- Crunk Juice - Lil Jon & the East Side Boyz
- Crunk Hits Vol. 2 - Various Artists
- Money Is Still A Major Issue - Pitbull
- Unknown Language - T.O.K.
- N.O.R.E. y la Familia...Ya Tú Sabe - N.O.R.E.
- The Boatlift - Pitbull
- Flame On - Machel Montano
- Rebelution - Pitbull
- 34 - Machel Montano
- Armando- Pitbull
- Ultra.Latino - DJ Buddha
- Planet Pit - Pitbull
- Bad 25 - Michael Jackson
- Global Warming - Pitbull
- Vive2Life - Pee Wee
- My World 2 - Dyland & Lenny
- Faith, Hope, y Amor - Frankie J (Grammy Nomination)
- Plat It Again EP - Becky G
- White People Party Music - Nick Cannon
- Tattoos - Jason Derulo
- Global - 3Ball MTY
- Forget the World - Afrojack
- Caribbean Beats Vol. 1 (Instrumental) - Various Artists
- Raw - Angela Hunte
- Yo - Christian Alicea
- Yo Deluxe - Christian Alicea
- Mango - Angela Hunte
- Swingkete Vol.1 - Maratón - Christian Alicea

== Publications ==
- The New York Times (2004)
- The Boston Globe (2004)
- Boston Herald (2005)
- Philadelphia Daily News (2004)
- Miami Herald (2005)
- The Village Voice (2004)
- The Source Magazine (2004)
- Fader Magazine (2004) & (2005)
- Ozone Magazine (2004) & (2005)
- Riddims Magazine (’04)
- MTV.com/Mixtape Mondays (3 times)
- LatinRapper.com (2004)
- Billboard.com (2010)
