= Planet Pit =

- Standard edition cover. Deluxe edition features a brown color scheme.

Studio album by Pitbull
- Released: June 17, 2011
- Recorded: 2009–2011
- Genres: Dance-pop; pop rap; hip-hop; hip house
- Length: 42:43
- Labels: Mr. 305; Polo Grounds; J; Sony
- Producers: DJ Buddha; Affect; Afrojack; Apster; Benny Blanco; Clinton Sparks; David Guetta; DJ Frank E; DJ Snake; Dr. Luke; Drop; Jacob Luttrell; Jason Perry; Jim Jonsin; Jimmy Joker; Marc Kinchen; Ne-Yo; Nicola Fasano; Polow da Don; Redfoo; RedOne; Rush; Sandy Vee; Sean Hurley; Vein

Pitbull chronology
Armando (2010)	Planet Pit (2011)	Global Warming (2012)

Singles from Planet Pit
- 1. "Hey Baby (Drop It to the Floor)" Released: September 14, 2010; 2. "Give Me Everything" Released: March 17, 2011; 3. "Rain Over Me" Released: June 8, 2011; 4. "International Love" Released: November 1, 2011

Planet Pit is the sixth studio album by American rapper Pitbull. It was released on June 17, 2011, through Polo Grounds Music, Mr. 305 Entertainment, Sony Music, and J Records. The production on the album was handled by a variety of pop and hip-hop producers including David Guetta, RedOne, Dr. Luke, Jim Jonsin, Benny Blanco, Soulshock, Afrojack, DJ Snake and Polow da Don. The album also features guest appearances by Ne-Yo, Afrojack, Nayer, Marc Anthony, T-Pain, Enrique Iglesias, Sean Paul, Chris Brown, Kelly Rowland, Jamie Drastik, Redfoo, Jamie Foxx, David Guetta, Akon, DJ Frank E, Ludacris, Nelly, Machel Montano and more. The album was created with the goal that every song on the album could serve as one single. The album is influenced by Pitbull's childhood years listening to merengue, freestyle, cha-cha-cha, Miami bass, hip hop and dancehall.

Planet Pit was supported by four singles: "Hey Baby (Drop It to the Floor)", "Rain Over Me", "International Love" and the US number one hit "Give Me Everything". The album received generally positive reviews from music critics and was a commercial success. The album debuted at number seven on the US Billboard 200, with first-week sales of 55,000 copies in the United States. This was Pitbull's final album for the J Records label, since the label would be discontinued during the summer of 2011.

== Singles ==
Planet Pit spawned four singles from the album's songs. The first single, "Hey Baby (Drop It to the Floor)" featuring T-Pain, was released on September 14, 2010. The song peaked at number seven on the US Billboard Hot 100, and number ten in Canada and Australia. The song was also used in the So Kodak advertising campaign by American technology company Kodak. The second single, "Give Me Everything" featuring Ne-Yo, Afrojack and Nayer, was released on March 17, 2011. The single peaked at number one on the US Billboard Hot 100, becoming Pitbull's first US number one single. The single also peaked at number one on the charts in the UK and Canada, at number two in Germany, France, Spain and Australia, and number four in Italy. The third single, "Rain Over Me" featuring Marc Anthony, was released on June 8, 2011. The song peaked at number 30 on the US Billboard Hot 100, number one in Spain, number two in France, number seven in Germany and Canada, and number nine in Australia. The final single, "International Love" featuring Chris Brown, was released on November 1, 2011. The song peaked at number 13 on the US Billboard Hot 100, number three in Spain, number six in France, and number ten in the UK and Canada.

=== Promotional singles ===
"Pause" was released on June 7, 2011, as the album's first promotional single. The track was used to promote the Zumba fitness program via a video contest. The song debuted and peaked at number 73 on the US Billboard Hot 100.

"Shake Señora" was released on August 11, 2011, as the album's second promotional single. The song peaked at number 69 on the US Billboard Hot 100 and number 33 on the Canadian Hot 100.

=== Other songs ===
"Oye Baby" featuring Nicola Fasano was released on February 8, 2012.

"Alright" featuring Michael Montano was released on April 13, 2010. While the song was featured on the album Mr. Worldwide in the United States, the Japan exclusive version of Planet Pit consisted of the track.

== Critical reception ==
Professional ratings
Aggregate scores
Source	Rating
Metacritic	70/100
Review scores
Source	Rating
AllMusic	4/5 stars
Club Fonograma	(48/100)
Digital Spy	2/5 stars
Entertainment Weekly	(A−)
HipHopDX	3.5/5
Us Magazine	3/5 stars
Rolling Stone	3/5 stars
Slant Magazine	1/5 stars
The New York Times	(positive)
The Washington Post	(favorable)

The album received generally positive reviews from critics. On Metacritic, which assigns a normalized rating out of 100 to reviews from mainstream critics, the album received an average score of 70, based on twelve reviews, which indicates "Generally favorable reviews". Allison Stewart of The Washington Post gave Planet Pit a favorable review writing, "His new disc, “Planet Pit,” dispenses with the idea that pop albums should consist of a few celebrity-packed singles topped off with filler. Every song here is a superstar/super-producer collaboration, every song a banger" and referring to the album as "its own future Greatest Hits package." In his review for Us Magazine, Ian Drew gave the album three out of five stars and commented, "If you want a huge pop hit these days, get Pitbull to rap on it". He concluded, "So naturally, the Cuban MC, 30, calls in his own big A-list favors for his latest CD, comprised entirely of (what else?) pulsating club bangers." Robert Copsey of Digital Spy gave the album two out five stars, saying that "with another impressive rosta of guest vocalists and knob-twiddling boffs on board, there are a few - albeit, minor - sparks of joy to be found here", and concluded that "Planet Pit for the most part remains the usual mix of headache-inducing house-hip-hop and sleazy chat-up lines."

Rolling Stone's Jody Rosen gave the album three out of five stars, writing "There are guest spots by R&B stars (Chris Brown) and Latin lovers (Enrique Iglesias). There are baldfaced rewrites of the Black Eyed Peas' "I Gotta Feeling" ("Give Me Everything") and Eminem's "Love the Way You Lie" ("Castle Made of Sand"). But there's something charming about Pitbull's enthusiasm - he sounds most like himself when he's promoting his brand." David Jeffries of AllMusic gave the album four out of five stars writing, "Solid hooks, polished production, cutting-edge tricks, and a star-studded guest list makes this a blockbuster thrill ride, but the reason Planet Pit retains its sense of fun through repeated listens is the man’s cool charisma and cheeky attitude" and concluding, "This is a hip-hop-flavored club effort of Elephunk proportions and another high-water mark for the don of pop-rap's glitter dome." The New York Times critic Jon Caramanica gave the album a positive review, calling the album the completion of Pitbull's "long transformation from crunk-era curio to dance-rap star", stating: "The music is ambitious and appealing, surrendering any claim to dignity in favor of huge, swelling progressions and stomping tempos. [...] It also serves as a warning for pop producers, who can now see that megaclub-friendly dance music — once held at arms length as a scourge of the Europeans — can be home for major American stars in a variety of genres".

== Commercial performance ==
Planet Pit debuted at number seven on the US Billboard 200 chart, selling 55,000 copies in its first week. This became Pitbull's second US top-ten debut and his highest-charting album in the US. In its second week, the album dropped to number 14 on the chart, selling an additional 28,000 copies. As of September 2012, the album has sold 477,000 copies in the US. On October 16, 2020, the album was certified double platinum by the Recording Industry Association of America (RIAA) for combined sales and album-equivalent units of over two million units in the United States.

== Track listing ==
Standard edition
No.	Title	Writer(s)	Producer(s)	Length
1.	"Mr. Worldwide (Intro)" (featuring Vein)	Armando C. Perez; Michaela "Mickey" Shiloh; Gavriel Aminov	Vein; José García; IAmChino	1:24
2.	"Give Me Everything" (featuring Ne-Yo, Afrojack and Nayer)	Perez; Nick van de Wall; Shaffer Smith	Afrojack	4:12
3.	"Rain Over Me" (featuring Marc Anthony)	Perez; Nadir Khayat; Marc Anthony; Bilal "The Chef" Hajji; AJ Janussi; Rachid Aziz	RedOne; Rush; Jimmy Joker	3:51
4.	"Hey Baby (Drop It to the Floor)" (featuring T-Pain)	Perez; Sandy Wilhelm; Faheem Najm	Sandy Vee	3:54
5.	"Pause"	Perez; Abdesamad Ben Abdelouahid; Adrian Santalla; Ari Kalimi; Urales Vargas	Apster; DJ Buddha; Affect; Drop	3:00
6.	"Come n Go" (featuring Enrique Iglesias)	Perez; Lukasz Gottwald; Benjamin Levin; Max Martin; Enrique Iglesias	Dr. Luke; Benny Blanco	3:50
7.	"Shake Señora" (featuring T-Pain and Sean Paul)	Perez; Clinton Sparks; William Grigahcine; Najm; Sean Paul Henriques; Ralph de Leon; Harry Belafonte; Gabriel Oller; Steve Samuel	DJ Snake; Sparks	3:34
8.	"International Love" (featuring Chris Brown)	Perez; Carsten Shack; Peter Biker; Sean Hurley; Claude Kelly	Soulshock; Biker; Hurley	3:47
9.	"Castle Made of Sand" (featuring Kelly Rowland and Jamie Drastik)	Perez; Justin Franks; Jacob Luttrell; Julie Frost; Kelly Rowland; James Huy	DJ Frank E; Luttrell; Rico Love	3:48
10.	"Took My Love" (featuring Redfoo, Vein and David Rush)	Perez; Stefan Kendal Gordy; Gravriel Aminov; Vargas; David Mauricio Bowen-Petterson; Neal Conway; Crystal Waters	Redfoo	4:29
11.	"Where Do We Go" (featuring Jamie Foxx)	Perez; James Scheffer; Marc Kinchen; Danny Morris; Leroy Sanchez; Jamie Foxx	Jim Jonsin; MK	3:50
12.	"Something for the DJs (featuring Afrojack and David Guetta)"	Perez; David Guetta; van de Wall; Rico Love	Guetta; Afrojack	3:04
Total length:				42:43

UK edition
No.	Title	Writer(s)	Producer(s)	Length
13.	"I Know You Want Me (Calle Ocho)"	Perez; Edward Bello; Daniel Seraphine; David Wolinsky; Nicola Fasano; Paul Gonella; Stefano Bosco	Fasano; Pitbull	3:57
14.	"Hotel Room Service"	John Reid; Marc Kinchen; Mark Ross; David Hobbs; Nile Rodgers; Hugh Brankin; Perez; Graham Wilson; Ross Campbell; James Scheffer; Bernard Edwards; Luther Campbell; Christopher Wongwon	Jim Jonsin	3:58

Deluxe edition
No.	Title	Writer(s)	Producer(s)	Length
13.	"Mr. Right Now" (featuring Akon)	Perez; Justin Franks; Jacob Luttrell; Aliaune Thiam	DJ Frank E; Luttrell	3:07
14.	"Shake Señora (Remix)" (featuring T-Pain, Sean Paul and Ludacris)	Perez; Clinton Sparks; William Grigahcine; Najm; Sean Paul Henriques; Christopher Bridges; Ralph de Leon; Harry Belafonte; Gabriel Oller; Steve Samuel	DJ Snake; Sparks	4:12
15.	"Oye Baby" (Pitbull vs. Nicola Fasano)	Perez; Nicola Fasano; Stefano Bosco; Massimiliano Moroldo; Airto Moreira	Fasano	2:55
16.	"My Kinda Girl" (featuring Nelly)	Perez; Jamal Jones; Cornell Haynes; Jason Perry; Donnie Scantz	Polow da Don; Perry	3:40
Total length:				56:37

Japanese Deluxe Edition
No.	Title	Writer(s)	Producer(s)	Length
17.	"Alright" (featuring Machel Montano)	Perez; Kinchen; Vargas; Machel Montano; Jason Nutron Carter	MK	3:55
Total length:				1:00:32

Sample credits

- "Pause" contains a sample from "Bubble Gutz", as written by Abdesamad Ben Abdelouahid and performed by Apster.
- "Took My Love" contains a portion of the composition "Gypsy Woman (She's Homeless)", as written by Neal Conway and Crystal Waters and performed by Crystal Waters.
- "Oye Baby" contains a replayed sample from "Tombo in 7/4", as written by Airto Moreira.

== Charts ==
=== Weekly charts ===
2011 weekly chart performance for Planet Pit
Chart (2011)	Peak position
Australian Albums (ARIA)	5
Australian Urban Albums (ARIA)	2
Austrian Albums (Ö3 Austria)	3
Belgian Albums (Ultratop Flanders)	24
Belgian Albums (Ultratop Wallonia)	11
Canadian Albums (Billboard)	4
Czech Albums (ČNS IFPI)	33
Danish Albums (Hitlisten)	39
Dutch Albums (Album Top 100)	21
Finnish Albums (Suomen virallinen lista)	21
French Albums (SNEP)	13
German Albums (Offizielle Top 100)	6
Greek Albums (IFPI Greece)	27
Hungarian Albums (MAHASZ)	6
Irish Albums (IRMA)	17
Italian Albums (FIMI)	8
Mexican Albums (Top 100 Mexico)	12
New Zealand Albums (RMNZ)	10
Norwegian Albums (VG-lista)	30
Polish Albums (ZPAV)	12
Portuguese Albums (AFP)	24
Scottish Albums (Official Charts)	16
Spanish Albums (Promusicae)	5
Swiss Albums (Schweizer Hitparade)	2
South Korean International Albums (Circle)	6
UK Albums (Official Charts)	11
UK R&B Albums (Official Charts)	1
US Billboard 200	7
US Digital Albums (Billboard)	7
US Indie Store Album Sales (Billboard)	22
US Top R&B/Hip-Hop Albums (Billboard)	3
US Top Rap Albums (Billboard)	2

2025–2026 weekly chart performance for Planet Pit
Chart (2025–2026)	Peak position
German Hip-Hop Albums (Offizielle Top 100)	11
Lithuanian Albums (AGATA)	6
Norwegian Albums (VG-lista)	17
Portuguese Albums (AFP)	113
Swedish Albums (Sverigetopplistan)	24

=== Year-end charts ===
2011 year-end chart performance for Planet Pit
Chart (2011)	Position
Australian Albums (ARIA)	43
Austrian Albums (Ö3 Austria)	40
Canadian Albums (Billboard)	24
German Albums (Offizielle Top 100)	54
Hungarian Albums (MAHASZ)	56
Swiss Albums (Schweizer Hitparade)	28
US Billboard 200	124
US Top R&B/Hip-Hop Albums (Billboard)	35

2012 year-end chart performance for Planet Pit
Chart (2012)	Position
Australian Albums (ARIA)	75
Belgian Albums (Ultratop Flanders)	96
US Billboard 200	123
US Top R&B/Hip-Hop Albums (Billboard)	25

2024 year-end chart performance for Planet Pit
Chart (2024)	Position
Hungarian Albums (MAHASZ)	82

2025 year-end chart performance for Planet Pit
Chart (2025)	Position
Hungarian Albums (MAHASZ)	42
Swedish Albums (Sverigetopplistan)	69
Swiss Albums (Schweizer Hitparade)	71

== Certifications ==
Region	Certification	Certified units/sales
Australia (ARIA)	Platinum	70,000^{^}
Austria (IFPI Austria)	Gold	10,000^{*}
Canada (Music Canada)	Platinum	80,000^{^}
Denmark (IFPI Danmark)	2× Platinum	40,000^{‡}
France (SNEP)	Platinum	100,000^{*}
Germany (BVMI)	Platinum	200,000^{‡}
Hungary (MAHASZ)	4× Platinum	24,000^{‡}
Italy (FIMI)	Platinum	50,000^{‡}
Japan (RIAJ)	Gold	100,000^{^}
Mexico (AMPROFON)	Platinum+Gold	90,000^{‡}
New Zealand (RMNZ)	2× Platinum	30,000^{‡}
Poland (ZPAV)	2× Platinum	40,000^{‡}
Singapore (RIAS)	Gold	5,000^{*}
Sweden (GLF)	Platinum	40,000^{‡}
Switzerland (IFPI Switzerland)	Gold	15,000^{^}
United Kingdom (BPI)	Platinum	300,000^{‡}
United States (RIAA)	3× Platinum	3,000,000^{‡}
^{*} Sales figures based on certification alone.^{^} Shipments figures based on certification alone.^{‡} Sales+streaming figures based on certification alone.

== Release history ==
Country	Date	Format
Australia	June 17, 2011	CD, digital download
Germany	June 17, 2011	CD, digital download
Ireland	June 17, 2011	CD, digital download
Netherlands	June 17, 2011	CD, digital download
United Kingdom	June 20, 2011	CD, digital download
United States	June 21, 2011	CD, digital download
Denmark	June 22, 2011	CD, digital download
Brazil	June 30, 2011	CD, digital download
Poland	August 8, 2011	CD, digital download
United States	June 17, 2011	iTunes LP
