= Alan Bersten =

American professional dancer (born 1994)

- Born: May 26, 1994 (age 32); Minnetonka, Minnesota, U.S.
- Occupations: Dancer, choreographer
- Years active: 2001–present
- Height: 6 ft 0 in (183 cm)

Alan Bersten (born May 26, 1994) is an American professional Latin and ballroom dancer. He was a contestant in 2013 on the tenth season of So You Think You Can Dance and is currently a professional dancer and choreographer on Dancing with the Stars. He was the winner in 2019 of season 28 of Dancing with the Stars with his celebrity partner, The Bachelorette star Hannah Brown.

== Personal life ==
Bersten was born and raised in Minnesota on May 26, 1994. His family heritage is Russian Jewish. He started dancing at the age of 7 in 2001. He graduated from Hopkins High School in 2012.

In 2018, Bersten was on tour with Dancing with the Stars when he began to have severe stomach pain. A blood test showed he had symptoms of a tumor on one of his parathyroid glands called hyperparathyroidism. He underwent surgery the next day to remove his left parathyroid. Bersten returned to work after only a week of recovery.

As of April 2025, Bersten is in a relationship with fellow Dancing with the Stars member Emma Slater.

== Dancing with the Stars ==
=== Performances ===
Bersten started working on Dancing with the Stars in season 20 as a member of the troupe. He remained in that role for four more seasons until he made his debut as a professional partner in season 25.

During the second week of season 22, Bersten danced a salsa with Paige VanZant, as VanZant's regular partner, Mark Ballas, suffered a back injury during rehearsals. Bersten learned the entire dance routine on one day's notice and performed the dance for the live show the following day. In season 24, Bersten danced with Heather Morris for four weeks while Morris's regular partner, Maksim Chmerkovskiy, was recovering from an injury.

Bersten was promoted to a professional partner in season 25, where he was partnered with 1980s singer-songwriter and Broadway actress Debbie Gibson. They were eliminated in the second week and took 12th place. Bersten was also featured on the official promotional poster for the show that season alongside fellow cast member Sharna Burgess.

For season 26, Bersten was partnered with Olympic figure skater Mirai Nagasu. They were eliminated in the third week of competition, tying for 4th place with Chris Mazdzer and partner Witney Carson and Jennie Finch Daigle and partner Keo Motsepe.

For season 27, Bersten was partnered with model Alexis Ren. The couple reached the finals and took 4th place.

For season 28, Bersten was partnered with The Bachelorette star Hannah Brown. They reached the finals and were crowned the season's champions on November 25, 2019.

For season 29, Bersten returned to compete again and is paired with Disney Channel star Skai Jackson. They were eliminated week 10, finishing in 5th place.

For season 30, Bersten was partnered with The Talk co-host and dancer Amanda Kloots. They reached the finals and finished in 4th place.

For season 31, Bersten was partnered with country music singer Jessie James Decker. They were eliminated week 6, finishing in 10th place.

For season 32, Bersten was partnered with Zoey 101 actress and singer Jamie Lynn Spears. They were eliminated on the second week of competition and finished 13th.

For season 33, Bersten was partnered with Olympic rugby player Ilona Maher. They made it to the finale and finished as the runners-up on November 26, 2024.

For season 34, Bersten was partnered with actress Elaine Hendrix. The couple made it to the finals and finished in 5th place.

For season 35, Bersten was partnered with celebrity chef, Giada De Laurentiis. The couple was the third to be eliminated and finished in 14th place, Bersten's lowest placement to date.

| Season | Partner | Place |
|---|---|---|
| 25 | Debbie Gibson | 12th |
| 26 | Mirai Nagasu | 4th |
| 27 | Alexis Ren | 4th |
| 28 | Hannah Brown | 1st |
| 29 | Skai Jackson | 5th |
| 30 | Amanda Kloots | 4th |
| 31 | Jessie James Decker | 10th |
| 32 | Jamie Lynn Spears | 13th |
| 33 | Ilona Maher | 2nd |
| 34 | Elaine Hendrix | 5th |
| 35 | Giada De Laurentiis | 14th |

==== Season 25 ====
With celebrity partner Debbie Gibson

| Week | Dance | Song | Judges' score | | | Total | Result |
|---|---|---|---|---|---|---|---|
| Week | Dance | Song | Inaba | Goodman | Tonioli | Total | Result |
| 1 | Foxtrot | "Lost in Your Eyes" — Debbie Gibson | 6 | 5 | 6 | 17 | No Elimination |
| 2 | Quickstep | "This Is My Time" — Amy Stroup | 7 | 6 | 7 | 20 | Safe |
| 2 | Argentine tango | "Havana" — Camila Cabello, feat. Young Thug | 7 | 7 | 7 | 21 | Eliminated |

Bersten also performed with Vanessa Lachey the week after his elimination for "Guilty Pleasures Night", filling in for Maksim Chmerkovskiy, who had taken the week off due to a "personal matter".

| Week | Dance | Song | Judge's score | | | Total | Result |
|---|---|---|---|---|---|---|---|
| Week | Dance | Song | Inaba | Goodman | Tonioli | Total | Result |
| 3 | Jazz | "Girls Just Want to Have Fun" — Cyndi Lauper | 7 | 8 | 8 | 23 | No Elimination |

==== Season 26 ====
With celebrity partner Mirai Nagasu

| Week | Dance | Song | Judges' score | | | Total | Result |
|---|---|---|---|---|---|---|---|
| Week | Dance | Song | Inaba | Goodman | Tonioli | Total | Result |
| 1 | Salsa | "No Excuses" — Meghan Trainor | 7 | 8 | 8 | 23 | Safe |
| 2 | Foxtrot | "It's a Small World" — The O'Neill Brothers | 9 | 9 | 9 | 37 (Note: Mirai and Alan also received a score of 10 from guest judge Rashad Jennings) | Safe |
| 2 | Team Freestyle | "Instant Replay" — Dan Hartman | 9 | 9 | 9 | 37 (Note: The team freestyle also received a score of 10 from guest judge Rashad Jennings) | Safe |
| 3 (Semifinals) | Quickstep | "BO$$" — Fifth Harmony | 9 | 8 | 9 | 35 (Note: Mirai and Alan also received a score of 9 from guest judge David Ross) | Eliminated |
| 3 (Semifinals) | Jive Dance-off | "Johnny B. Goode" — Chuck Berry | —N/a | —N/a | —N/a | 0 (Note: Mirai and Alan received votes from David and Len, but lost the dance-off.) | Eliminated |

==== Season 27 ====
With celebrity partner Alexis Ren

| Week | Dance | Song | Judges' score | | | Total | Result |
|---|---|---|---|---|---|---|---|
| Week | Dance | Song | Inaba | Goodman | Tonioli | Total | Result |
| 1 | Jive | "Good Golly, Miss Molly" — Little Richard | 7 | 7 | 7 | 21 | Bottom Five |
| 1 | Jive | "Shake the Room" — Gamu | 7 | 8 | 8 | 23 | Safe |
| 2 | Argentine tango | "Swan Lake Suite" — Ray Chew | 8 | 9 | 8 | 25 | No Elimination |
| 2 | Salsa | "Booty" — Jennifer Lopez, feat. Iggy Azalea | 8 | 8 | 8 | 24 | Safe |
| 3 | Contemporary | "How to Save a Life" — Ray Chew | 9 | 8 | 9 | 26 | Safe |
| 4 | Trio Tango (Note: Joined by Maddie Ziegler) | "Move Your Body" — Sia | 8 | 8 | 9 | 25 | Safe |
| 5 | Foxtrot | "Just Around the Riverbend" — Judy Kuhn | 10 | 9 | 10 | 29 | No elimination |
| 6 | Jazz | "Candyman" — Christina Aguilera | 9 | 9 | 9 | 27 | Safe |
| 7 | Samba | "Ladies in the ’90s" — Lauren Alaina | 9 | 10 | 10 | 29 | Safe |
| 7 | Team Freestyle | "Country Girl (Shake It for Me)" — Luke Bryan | 9 | 8 | 9 | 26 | Safe |
| 8 (Semifinals) | Waltz | "Water" — Bishop Briggs | 9 | 9 | 10 | 28 | Safe |
| 8 (Semifinals) | Jive | "Yes" — Merry Clayton | 10 | 10 | 10 | 30 | Safe |
| 9 (Finals) | Argentine tango | "Swan Lake Suite" — Ray Chew | 9 | 9 | 9 | 27 | Fourth Place |
| 9 (Finals) | Freestyle | "Head Above Water" — Avril Lavigne | 10 | 10 | 10 | 30 | Fourth Place |

==== Season 28 ====
With celebrity partner Hannah Brown

| Week | Dance | Dance / Song | Judges' score | | | Total | Result |
|---|---|---|---|---|---|---|---|
| Week | Dance | Dance / Song | Inaba | Goodman | Tonioli | Total | Result |
| 1 | Cha-cha-cha | "I Wanna Dance with Somebody" — Whitney Houston | 7 | 7 | 6 | 20 | No Elimination |
| 2 | Viennese waltz | "Lover" — Taylor Swift | 8 | 8 | 8 | 24 | Safe |
| 3 | Rumba | "Hold On" — Wilson Phillips | 7 | 7 | 7 | 21 | Safe |
| 4 | Paso doble | "I Love It" — Icona Pop, feat. Charli XCX | 8 | 8 | 8 | 32 (Note: Hannah and Alan also received a score of 8 from guest judge Leah Remini) | Safe |
| 5 | Foxtrot | "A Whole New World" — Zayn & Zhavia Ward | 9 | 7 | 9 | 25 | No Elimination |
| 6 | Samba | "Southbound" — Carrie Underwood | 8 | 8 | 8 | 24 | Safe |
| 7 | Jazz | "Bad Girls" — Donna Summer | 8 | 9 | 8 | 25 | Safe |
| 7 | Team Freestyle | "Somebody's Watching Me" — Rockwell | 9 | 9 | 9 | 27 | Safe |
| 8 | Quickstep | "American Girl" — Elle King | 10 | 9 | 10 | 29 | Safe |
| 8 | Salsa Dance-off | "Rhythm Is Gonna Get You" — Gloria Estefan & Miami Sound Machine | —N/a | —N/a | —N/a | 2 (Note: Hannah and Alan were awarded two bonus points for winning the dance-off) | Safe |
| 9 | Salsa | "No Scrubs" — TLC | 8 | 8 | 8 | 32 (Note: Hannah and Alan also received a score of 8 from guest judge Joey Fatone) | Safe |
| 9 | Tango | "Boy with Luv" — BTS | 10 | 9 | 10 | 39 (Note: Hannah and Alan also received a score of 10 from guest judge Joey Fatone) | Safe |
| 10 (Semifinals) | Rumba | "Dancing with a Stranger" — Sam Smith & Normani | 9 | 9 | 9 | 27 | Safe |
| 10 (Semifinals) | Contemporary | "Lose You to Love Me" — Selena Gomez | 9 | 9 | 9 | 27 | Safe |
| 11 (Finals) | Viennese waltz | "Lover" — Taylor Swift | 10 | 9 | 9 | 28 | Winners |
| 11 (Finals) | Freestyle | "Girl on Fire" — Alicia Keys "Hollaback Girl" — Gwen Stefani | 10 | 10 | 10 | 30 | Winners |

==== Season 29 ====
With celebrity partner Skai Jackson

| Week | Dance | Song | Judges' score | | | Total | Result |
|---|---|---|---|---|---|---|---|
| Week | Dance | Song | Inaba | Hough | Tonioli | Total | Result |
| 1 | Tango | "Super Bass" — Nicki Minaj | 7 | 7 | 7 | 21 | No elimination |
| 2 | Samba | "Miss Independent" — Ne-Yo | 5 | 5 | 5 | 15 | Safe |
| 3 | Jive | "Almost There" — Anika Noni Rose | 6 | 6 | 6 | 18 | Safe |
| 4 | Foxtrot | "Ordinary People" — John Legend | 10 | 9 | 9 | 28 | Safe |
| 5 | Jazz | "The Power of Love" — Huey Lewis and the News | 8 | 8 | 8 | 24 | Safe |
| 6 | Cha-cha-cha | "Say So" — Doja Cat, feat. Nicki Minaj | 6 | 6 | 6 | 18 | Safe |
| 7 | Argentine tango | "Everything I Wanted" — Billie Eilish | 9 | 9 | 9 | 27 | Safe |
| 8 | Salsa | "Work It" — Missy Elliott | 8 | 9 | 8 | 25 | Bottom Two |
| 8 | Samba Relay | "Levitating" — Dua Lipa, feat. DaBaby | —N/a | —N/a | —N/a | 2 (Note: Skai and Alan were awarded two bonus points) | Bottom Two |
| 9 | Paso doble | "If" — Janet Jackson | 9 | 9 | 9 | 27 | Safe |
| 9 | Salsa Dance-off | "The Cup of Life" — Ricky Martin | —N/a | —N/a | —N/a | 2 (Note: Skai and Alan were awarded two bonus points for winning the dance-off) | Safe |
| 10 (Semifinals) | Cha-cha-cha | "Move Your Feet" — Junior Senior | 9 | 9 | 9 | 27 | Eliminated |
| 10 (Semifinals) | Viennese waltz | "Lonely" — Noah Cyrus | 10 | 10 | 10 | 30 | Eliminated |

==== Season 30 ====
With celebrity partner Amanda Kloots

| Week | Dance | Song | Judges' score | | | | Total | Result |
|---|---|---|---|---|---|---|---|---|
| Week | Dance | Song | Inaba | Goodman | Hough | Tonioli | Total | Result |
| 1 | Tango | "Dance Again" — Jennifer Lopez & Pitbull | 7 | 7 | 7 | 7 | 28 | No Elimination |
| 2 | Foxtrot | "It Had to Be You" — Ray Chew | 8 | 8 | 8 | 8 | 32 | Safe |
| 3 | Cha-cha-cha | "Circus" — Britney Spears | 8 | 8 | —N/a | 8 | 24 (Note: Due to Derek Hough's absence, scores were given on a 30-point scale) | Safe |
| 4 | Rumba | "You'll Be in My Heart" — Phil Collins | 8 | 8 | 8 | 8 | 32 | No Elimination |
| 4 | Paso doble | "Call Me Cruella" — Florence and the Machine | 9 | 9 | 9 | 9 | 36 | Safe |
| 5 | Viennese waltz | "Beauty School Dropout" — Frankie Avalon | 10 | 10 | 9 | 10 | 39 | Safe |
| 6 | Argentine tango | "Paint It Black" — Ciara | 9 | 9 | 10 | 10 | 38 | Safe |
| 7 | Jive | "Don't Stop Me Now" — Queen | 8 | 8 | 8 | 9 | 33 | Safe |
| 7 | Viennese waltz Relay | "We Are the Champions" — Queen | —N/a | —N/a | —N/a | —N/a | 1 (Note: Amanda and Alan received one point from Derek.) | Safe |
| 8 | Jazz | "Miss You Much" — Janet Jackson | 10 | 10 | 10 | 10 | 40 | Safe |
| 8 | Cha-cha-cha Dance-off | "Together Again" — Janet Jackson | —N/a | —N/a | —N/a | —N/a | 2 (Note: Amanda and Alan were awarded two bonus points for winning the dance-off) | Safe |
| 9 (Semifinals) | Tango | "Titanium" — David Guetta, feat. Sia | 9 | 10 | 10 | 10 | 39 | Bottom Three |
| 9 (Semifinals) | Contemporary | "Live Your Life" — Lenii | 10 | 10 | 10 | 10 | 40 | Bottom Three |
| 10 (Finals) | Viennese waltz & Paso doble Fusion | "Never Tear Us Apart" — Bishop Briggs | 9 | 10 | 9 | 10 | 38 | Fourth Place |
| 10 (Finals) | Freestyle | "A Sky Full of Stars" — Coldplay | 10 | 10 | 10 | 10 | 40 (Note: Due to Derek Hough's absence, Julianne Hough filled in on the judges' panel) | Fourth Place |

==== Season 31 ====
With celebrity partner Jessie James Decker

| Week | Dance | Song | Judges' score | | | | Total | Result |
|---|---|---|---|---|---|---|---|---|
| Week | Dance | Song | Inaba | Goodman | Hough | Tonioli | Total | Result |
| 1 | Cha-cha-cha | "Sweet Home Alabama" — Lynyrd Skynyrd | 5 | 5 | 5 | 5 | 20 | Safe |
| 2 | Foxtrot | "Trouble" — Elvis Presley | 7 | 6 | 6 | 6 | 25 | Safe |
| 3 | Rumba | "Goldfinger" — Shirley Bassey | 6 | 6 | 7 | 7 | 26 | Safe |
| 4 | Jive | "One Way Or Another" — Bette Midler, Sarah Jessica Parker & Kathy Najimy | 8 | 7 | 8 | 8 | 31 | Safe |
| 5 | Tango | "Blue Jeans" — Jessie James Decker | 7 | 7 | 8 | 7 | 29 | No Elimination |
| 5 | Viennese waltz | "Breakaway" — Kelly Clarkson | 8 | 8 | 8 | 8 | 32 | Safe |
| 5 | Hustle & Lindy Hop Marathon | "Hot Stuff" — Donna Summer "Jump, Jive an' Wail" — The Brian Setzer Orchestra | —N/a | —N/a | —N/a | —N/a | 11 (Note: Jessie & Alan received 11 points for winning the dance marathon.) | Safe |
| 6 | Salsa | "Come Dance with Me" — Michael Bublé | 8 | 8 | 8 | 8 | 41 (Note: Jessie and Alan also received a score of 9 from guest judge Michael Bublé) | Eliminated |

==== Season 32 ====
With celebrity partner Jamie Lynn Spears

| Week | Dance | Song | Judges' score | | | Total | Result |
|---|---|---|---|---|---|---|---|
| Week | Dance | Song | Inaba | Hough | Tonioli | Total | Result |
| 1 | Tango | "Don't Call Me Up (Zac Samuel Remix)" — Mabel | 5 | 5 | 5 | 15 | Safe |
| 2 | Cha-cha-cha | "Shake Señora" — Pitbull, feat. T-Pain & Sean Paul | 6 | 5 | 5 | 16 | Eliminated |

==== Season 33 ====
With celebrity partner Ilona Maher

| Week | Dance | Song | Judges' score | | | Total | Result |
|---|---|---|---|---|---|---|---|
| Week | Dance | Song | Inaba | Hough | Tonioli | Total | Result |
| 1 | Cha-cha-cha | "Man! I Feel Like a Woman!" — Shania Twain | 6 | 6 | 6 | 18 | No Elimination |
| 2 | Salsa | "(I've Had) The Time of My Life" — Bill Medley & Jennifer Warnes | 7 | 7 | 7 | 21 | Safe |
| 3 | Foxtrot | "Lady Marmalade" — Labelle | 8 | 7 | 7 | 30 (Note: Ilona and Alan also received a score of 8 from guest judge Rosie Perez) | Safe |
| 3 | Jive | "Cum On Feel the Noize" — Quiet Riot | 7 | 6 | 6 | 26 (Note: Ilona and Alan also received a score of 7 from guest judge Gene Simmons) | Safe |
| 4 | Rumba | "My Way" — Yseult | 8 | 8 | 8 | 32 (Note: Ilona and Alan also received a score of 8 from guest judge Mark Ballas) | Safe |
| 5 | Jazz | "Surface Pressure" — Jessica Darrow | 9 | 8 | 8 | 25 | Safe |
| 5 | Team Freestyle | "I 2 I" — Tevin Campbell & Rosie Gaines | 9 | 9 | 9 | 27 | Safe |
| 6 | Tango | "Psycho Killer" — Miley Cyrus | 8 | 8 | 8 | 24 | Safe |
| 6 | Cha-cha-cha Dance-off | "Ghostbusters" — Ray Parker Jr. | —N/a | —N/a | —N/a | 0 (Note: Ilona and Alan received zero bonus points for losing the dance-off) | Safe |
| 7 | Quickstep | "Chuck Berry" — Pharrell Williams | 10 | 9 | 9 | 28 | Safe |
| 7 | Salsa | "Da' Dip" — Freak Nasty | 8 | 8 | 8 | 24 | Safe |
| 8 (Semifinals) | Paso doble | "Unholy (Orchestral Version)" — Sam Smith & Kim Petras | 9 | 10 | 9 | 28 | No Elimination |
| 8 (Semifinals) | Viennese waltz | "Golden Hour" — Jvke | 10 | 9 | 10 | 29 | No Elimination |
| 9 (Finals) | Jive | "Shake a Tail Feather" — Ray Charles & the Blues Brothers | 9 | 9 | 9 | 27 | Runners-up |
| 9 (Finals) | Freestyle | "Femininomenon" — District 78 feat. Mona Rue | 10 | 10 | 10 | 30 | Runners-up |

==== Season 34 ====
With celebrity partner Elaine Hendrix

| Week | Dance | Song | Judges' score | | | Total | Result |
|---|---|---|---|---|---|---|---|
| Week | Dance | Song | Inaba | Hough | Tonioli | Total | Result |
| 1 | Cha-cha-cha | "Woman" — Kesha, feat. the Dap-Kings Horns | —N/a | 6 | 6 | 12 (Note: Due to Carrie Ann Inaba's absence, scores were given on a 20 point scale) | No elimination |
| 2 | Jive | "Hey Mickey" — Toni Basil | 7 | 7 | 7 | 21 | Safe |
| 3 | Tango | "Gnarly" — Katseye | 7 | 7 | 7 | 21 | Safe |
| 4 | Quickstep | "Space Mountain" | 8 | 8 | 8 | 24 | Safe |
| 5 | Foxtrot | "This Will Be (An Everlasting Love)" — Natalie Cole | 8 | 7 | 8 | 30 (Note: Elaine and Alan also received a score of 7 from guest judge Kym Johnson) | No elimination |
| 6 | Contemporary | "Defying Gravity" — Cynthia Erivo, feat. Ariana Grande | 9 | 9 | 9 | 36 (Note: Elaine and Alan also received a score of 9 from guest judge Jon M. Chu) | Safe |
| 7 | Argentine tango | "Bad to the Bone" — 2WEI & Bri Bryant | 8 | 8 | 8 | 32 (Note: Elaine and Alan also received a score of 9 from guest judge Cheryl Burke) | Safe |
| 7 | Hustle & Lindy Hop Marathon | "Murder on the Dancefloor" — Sophie Ellis-Bextor "A Little Party Never Killed Nobody (All We Got)" — Fergie, Q-Tip, & GoonRock | —N/a | —N/a | —N/a | 0 (Note: Elaine and Alan did not receive any points from the marathon due to her absence) | Safe |
| 8 | Viennese waltz | "What the World Needs Now is Love" — Dionne Warwick | 9 | 9 | 9 | 37 (Note: Elaine and Alan also received a score of 10 from guest judge Flavor Flav) | Safe |
| 8 | Team Freestyle | "Celebration" — Kool & the Gang | 9 | 10 | 9 | 38 (Note: The team dance also received a score of 10 from guest judge Flavor Flav) | Safe |
| 9 | Salsa | "It Takes Two" — Rob Base & DJ E-Z Rock | 9 | 9 | 9 | 36 (Note: Elaine and Alan also received a score of 9 from guest judge Tom Bergeron) | Safe |
| 9 | Quickstep Relay (Note: Elaine danced with season 24 winner Rashad Jennings for the relay.) | "I Get a Kick Out of You" — Michael Bublé | —N/a | —N/a | —N/a | 0 (Note: Elaine and Alan did not receive any bonus points for losing the relay round.) | Safe |
| | Foxtrot | "I Wanna Be Your Lover" — Prince | 9 | 9 | 9 | 27 | Safe |
| 10 | Paso doble | "When Doves Cry" — Prince | 10 | 10 | 10 | 30 | Safe |
| 11 | Rumba | "Take My Breath Away" — Jae Hall | 10 | 10 | 10 | 30 | Fifth Place |
| 11 | Quickstep | "You Can't Hurry Love" — The Supremes | 9 | 9 | 9 | 27 | Fifth Place |
| 11 | Freestyle | "I Hope I Get It" — District 78 (from A Chorus Line) | 10 | 10 | 10 | 30 | Fifth Place |

==== Season 35 ====
With celebrity partner Giada De Laurentiis

| Week | Dance | Song | Judges' score | | | Total | Result |
|---|---|---|---|---|---|---|---|
| Week | Dance | Song | Inaba | Hough | Tonioli | Total | Result |
| 1 | Tango | "Venus" — Shocking Blue | 6 | 5 | 5 | 16 | Safe |
| 2 | Salsa | "Bella Ciao" — Becky G | 4 | 4 | 4 | 12 | Eliminated |

Bersten is also set to perform with Jenna Dewan for the fifth week of competition, after Dewan's partner Val Chmerkovskiy was suspended earlier in the week after making inappropriate comments threatening judge Carrie Ann Inaba.

| Week | Dance | Song | Judges' score | | | Total | Result |
|---|---|---|---|---|---|---|---|
| Week | Dance | Song | Inaba | Hough | Tonioli | Total | Result |
| 5 | Viennese waltz | "Unchained Melody" — The Righteous Brothers | TBD | TBD | TBD | TBD | TBD |

==== Dancing with the Stars: Juniors ====
Bersten joined the first season of Dancing with the Stars spin-off series Dancing with the Stars: Juniors as a professional mentor. He formed Team Alan with junior professional dancer JT Church and 10-year-old professional skateboarder Sky Brown. Team Alan ended up winning the Juniors Mirrorball trophy on December 9, 2018.

| Week | Dance | Song | Judges' score | | | Total | Result |
|---|---|---|---|---|---|---|---|
| Week | Dance | Song | Chmerkovskiy | Moore | Rippon | Total | Result |
| 1 | Salsa | "Light It Up" — Major Lazer, featuring Nyla & Fuse ODG | 8 | 7 | 7 | 22 | Safe |
| 2 | Cha-cha-cha | "Just Dance" — Lady Gaga, featuring Colby O'Donis | 7 | 7 | 8 | 22 | Safe |
| 3 | Contemporary | "How Far I'll Go" — Auliʻi Cravalho | 8 | 8 | 8 | 24 | Safe |
| 4 | Jive | "Little Shop of Horrors" — Kidz Bop | 9 | 9 | 8 | 26 | Safe |
| 5 | Samba | "The Greatest" — Sia | 8 | 8 | 7 | 23 | Safe |
| 6 | Foxtrot | "Unconditionally" – Katy Perry | 9 | 10 | 10 | 29 | Safe |
| 7 | Charleston | "A Little Party Never Killed Nobody (All We Got)" — Fergie, featuring Q-Tip & GoonRock | 9 | 9 | 9 | 27 | Safe |
| 8 | Argentine tango | "Thunder" — Imagine Dragons | 10 | 9 | 10 | 29 | No elimination |
| 8 | Jive and Foxtrot Fusion (Note: Performed with Ariana Greenblatt & Artyon Celestine) | "369" — Rhett George | 10 | 9 | 9 | 28 | No elimination |
| 9 | Salsa | "Light it Up" — Major Lazer, featuring Nyla & Fuse ODG | 10 | 10 | 10 | 30 | Winners |
| 9 | Freestyle | "Underneath the Tree" — Kelly Clarkson | 10 | 10 | 10 | 30 | Winners |

== Awards and achievements ==
Awards and achievements
| Preceded by Bobby Bones & Sharna Burgess | Dancing with the Stars (US) winner Season 28 (Fall 2019 with Hannah Brown) | Succeeded by Kaitlyn Bristowe & Artem Chigvintsev |
| Preceded by N/A | Dancing with the Stars: Juniors (US) winner Season 1 (Fall 2018 with Sky Brown & JT Church) | Succeeded by N/A |
| Preceded by Jason Mraz & Daniella Karagach | Dancing with the Stars (US) runner-up Season 33 (Fall 2024 with Ilona Maher) | Succeeded by Alix Earle & Valentin Chmerkovskiy |
| Preceded by N/A; Justina Machado & Sasha Farber | Dancing with the Stars (US) fourth place Season 27 (Fall 2018 with Alexis Ren); Season 30 (Fall 2021 with Amanda Kloots) | Succeeded by Lauren Alaina & Gleb Savchenko; Shangela & Gleb Savchenko |
| Preceded by Danny Amendola & Witney Carson | Dancing with the Stars (US) fifth place Season 34 (Fall 2025 with Elaine Hendrix) | Succeeded by TBD |
| Preceded by Victoria Arlen & Valentin Chmerkovskiy; James Van Der Beek & Emma Slater | Dancing with the Stars (US) semi-finalist Season 26 (Spring 2018 with Mirai Nagasu); Season 29 (Fall 2020 with Skai Jackson) | Succeeded by Juan Pablo Di Pace & Cheryl Burke; Joe Amabile & Jenna Johnson; Suni Lee & Sasha Farber; Melora Hardin & Artem Chigvintsev |
