= Dancing with the Stars (American TV series) season 30 =

Dancing with the Stars
- Season 30
- Promotional poster, featuring host Tyra Banks
- Hosted by: Tyra Banks
- Judges: Carrie Ann Inaba; Len Goodman; Bruno Tonioli; Derek Hough
- Celebrity winner: Iman Shumpert
- Professional winner: Daniella Karagach
- No. of episodes: 11

Release
- Original network: ABC
- Original release: September 20 – November 22, 2021

Season chronology
- ← Previous; Season 29 Next → Season 31

Season thirty of Dancing with the Stars premiered on September 20, 2021, on the ABC network and streamed on Hulu and concluded on November 22, 2021. This was the final season to air solely on ABC before the series moved to Disney+ in 2022.

NBA shooting guard Iman Shumpert and Daniella Karagach were crowned the champions, while YouTube personality JoJo Siwa and Jenna Johnson finished in second place, Peloton instructor Cody Rigsby and Cheryl Burke finished in third place, and The Talk co-host Amanda Kloots and Alan Bersten finished in fourth.

== Cast ==
=== Couples ===
This season featured fifteen celebrity contestants. On August 26, 2021, during the virtual Television Critics Association summer press tour, it was revealed that Suni Lee and JoJo Siwa would be celebrity participants. On September 1, it was reported that Olivia Jade, Amanda Kloots, and Matt James would join them. Before the cast was officially revealed, TMZ reported that The Real Housewives of Atlanta star Kenya Moore, NBA player Iman Shumpert, and actor Brian Austin Green would also compete. Mike "The Miz" Mizanin, Jimmie Allen, and Christine Chiu were also reported to be competing. The full roster of celebrity participants were officially revealed on Good Morning America on September 8.

The season's fifteen professional dancers, announced on September 2, had all performed on the show before, with Lindsay Arnold and Witney Carson returning after pregnancies. The lineup dropped Peta Murgatroyd and Keo Motsepe, who had competed in the previous season. For the first time in the series' history, one of the couples was same-sex: celebrity participant JoJo Siwa and professional dancer Jenna Johnson.

On September 10, 2021, it was announced that Sofia Ghavami and Ezra Sosa would be joining the show as professional dancers. Both dancers were showcased as part of the competing couples' dances throughout the season as well as opening numbers, and were also prepared to step in if a pro were unable to compete.

On September 26, professional dancer Cheryl Burke announced that she had tested positive for COVID-19 before the season's second episode and had to stay home and quarantine for 10 days. In the episode, Burke and her celebrity partner Cody Rigsby were judged on rehearsal footage. Rigsby tested positive for COVID-19 a few days later, though the two continued to compete, dancing together via live feed in their respective homes during week three. As of October 6, Burke was cleared to return to the ballroom, and Rigsby returned in-person during the first "Disney Week" episode.

Celebrity	Notability	Professional partner	Status	Ref.
Martin Kove	Film & television actor	Britt Stewart	Eliminated 1st on September 27, 2021	
Christine Chiu	Bling Empire cast member	Pasha Pashkov	Eliminated 2nd on October 4, 2021	
Brian Austin Green	Television actor	Sharna Burgess	Eliminated 3rd on October 12, 2021	
Matt James	The Bachelor star	Lindsay Arnold	Eliminated 4th on October 12, 2021	
Melanie C	Spice Girls singer	Gleb Savchenko	Eliminated 5th on October 18, 2021	
Kenya Moore	The Real Housewives of Atlanta cast member	Brandon Armstrong	Eliminated 6th on October 25, 2021	
Mike "The Miz" Mizanin	WWE wrestler	Witney Carson	Eliminated 7th on November 1, 2021	
Olivia Jade	Social media personality	Valentin Chmerkovskiy	Eliminated 8th on November 8, 2021	
Jimmie Allen	Country singer	Emma Slater	Eliminated 9th on November 8, 2021	
Melora Hardin	Film & television actress	Artem Chigvintsev	Eliminated 10th on November 15, 2021	
Suni Lee	Olympic artistic gymnast	Sasha Farber	Eliminated 11th on November 15, 2021	
Amanda Kloots	The Talk co-host	Alan Bersten	Fourth place on November 22, 2021	
Cody Rigsby	Peloton instructor & fitness personality	Cheryl Burke	Third place on November 22, 2021	
JoJo Siwa	YouTube personality, dancer & singer	Jenna Johnson	Runners-up on November 22, 2021	
Iman Shumpert	NBA shooting guard	Daniella Karagach	Winners on November 22, 2021	

=== Hosts and judges ===
Alongside the season renewal announcement on March 30, 2021, it was revealed that Tyra Banks would return as host, with Len Goodman, Derek Hough, Carrie Ann Inaba, and Bruno Tonioli returning as judges. For this season, each of the four judges was allowed a single vote on which dancer they would like to save. In the event of a tie vote amongst the four judges, Len's vote was considered the tie-breaker. This rule change has caused some controversy in the way it's been explained on the show, as many saw this as Len having an unfair advantage in determining which dancer is eliminated. On November 16, a day after the semi-finals, Derek Hough announced that he tested positive with a breakthrough case of COVID-19. On November 22, 2021, it was announced Julianne Hough would fill in for her brother Derek as a guest judge for the finale.

== Episodes ==
No. overall	No. in season	Title	Rating (18–49)	Original release date	U.S. viewers (millions)
460	1	"Premiere"	0.92	September 20, 2021	5.47
461	2	"First Elimination"	0.72	September 27, 2021	4.88
462	3	"Britney Night"	0.72	October 4, 2021	4.74
463	4	"Heroes Night"	0.69	October 11, 2021	4.62
464	5	"Villains Night"	0.66	October 12, 2021	4.32
465	6	"Grease Night"	0.77	October 18, 2021	5.02
466	7	"Horror Night"	0.71	October 25, 2021	4.86
467	8	"Queen Night"	0.70	November 1, 2021	4.79
468	9	"Janet Jackson Night"	0.71	November 8, 2021	4.72
469	10	"Semifinals"	0.67	November 15, 2021	4.80
470	11	"Finale"	0.88	November 22, 2021	5.64

== Scoring chart ==
The highest score each week is indicated in bold green. The lowest score each week is indicated in italicized red.

Color key:

Winners
Runners-up
Third place
Fourth place
Bottom two or three
Eliminated

Dancing with the Stars (season 30) - Weekly scores
Couple	Pl.	Week												
Couple	Pl.	1	2	1+2	3 (Note: The couples were scored on a 30-point scale due to Derek Hough's absence.)	4			5	6	7	8	9	10
Couple	Pl.	1	2	1+2	3	Night 1	Night 2	1+2	5	6	7	8	9	10
Iman & Daniella	1st	21	25	46	19	30	33	63	28‡	**40**†	32+2=34	35	37+38=75	40+40=**80**† (Note: This couple finished in first place.)
JoJo & Jenna	2nd	**29**†	31	**60**†	**24**†	35	35	70	**40**†	**40**†	39 (Note: This couple was in the bottom two or three, but was not eliminated.)	39+2=41	40+40=**80**†	40+40=**80**† (Note: This couple finished in second place.)
Cody & Cheryl	3rd	24	24	48	18‡	27	31	58	32	36	34+2=36	38	35+36=71‡	36+40=76‡ (Note: This couple finished in third place.)
Amanda & Alan	4th	28	**32**†	**60**†	**24**†	32	36	68	39	38	33+1=34	40+2=**42**†	39+40=79	38+40=78 (Note: This couple finished in fourth place.)
Suni & Sasha	5th	28	28	56	21	33	35	68	36	36	33+1=34	40+2=**42**†	37+38=75 (Note: This couple was eliminated.)	
Melora & Artem	6th	26	27	53	23	**36**†	**37**†	**73**†	36	34	36+2=38	40+2=**42**†	36+36=72	
Jimmie & Emma	7th	22	27	49	20	30+2=32	35	67	34	38	38	32‡		
Olivia & Val	8th	25	27	52	**24**†	35	35	70	36	36	38+4=**42**†	36		
The Miz & Witney	9th	24	26	50	22	31	34	65	32	34	32‡			
Kenya & Brandon	10th	26	24	50	21	29	30	59	36	32‡				
Melanie & Gleb	11th	27	30	57	22	31	35	66	36					
Matt & Lindsay	12th	24	22	46	20	26	31	57						
Brian & Sharna	13th	24	23	47	19	25‡	27‡	52‡						
Christine & Pasha	14th	25	24	49	21									
Martin & Britt	15th	13‡	15‡	28‡										

== Weekly scores ==
Individual judges' scores in the charts below (given in parentheses) are listed in this order from left to right: Carrie Ann Inaba, Len Goodman, Derek Hough, Bruno Tonioli.

=== Week 1: Premiere ===
The official partnerships were revealed to the public during the live broadcast. Couples are listed in the order they performed.

Couple	Scores	Dance	Music
Melanie & Gleb	27 (7, 7, 6, 7)	Cha-cha-cha	"Wannabe" — Spice Girls
The Miz & Witney	24 (6, 6, 6, 6)	Cha-cha-cha	"Butter" — BTS
Iman & Daniella	21 (7, 4, 5, 5)	Jive	"Hey Ya!" — Outkast
Olivia & Val	25 (7, 6, 6, 6)	Salsa	"Juice" — Lizzo
Jimmie & Emma	22 (6, 5, 6, 5)	Tango	"The Way I Are" — Timbaland, feat. Keri Hilson
Melora & Artem	26 (7, 6, 7, 6)	Tango	"Simply Irresistible" — Robert Palmer
Suni & Sasha	28 (7, 7, 7, 7)	Jive	"Stay" — The Kid Laroi & Justin Bieber
Cody & Cheryl	24 (6, 6, 6, 6)	Tango	"Physical" — Dua Lipa
Amanda & Alan	28 (7, 7, 7, 7)	Tango	"Dance Again" — Jennifer Lopez & Pitbull
Martin & Britt	13 (4, 3, 3, 3)	Paso doble	"You're the Best" — Joe Esposito
Kenya & Brandon	26 (7, 6, 6, 7)	Foxtrot	"Kiss Me More" — Doja Cat, feat. SZA
Christine & Pasha	25 (6, 7, 6, 6)	Tango	"Glamorous" — Fergie & Ludacris
Matt & Lindsay	24 (6, 6, 6, 6)	Cha-cha-cha	"Give It to Me Baby" — Rick James
Brian & Sharna	24 (6, 6, 6, 6)	Foxtrot	"Skate" — Silk Sonic
JoJo & Jenna	29 (8, 7, 7, 7)	Quickstep	"Are You Gonna Be My Girl" — Jet

=== Week 2: First Elimination ===
The couples performed one unlearned dance, and are listed in the order they performed.

Cheryl Burke tested positive for COVID-19 the day before the live show. As a result, Cody & Cheryl did not dance live and were instead judged on their studio rehearsal footage.

Couple	Scores	Dance	Music	Result
Matt & Lindsay	22 (5, 5, 6, 6)	Samba	"Levitating" — Dua Lipa	Safe
Olivia & Val	27 (7, 6, 7, 7)	Viennese waltz	"Better Days" — Ant Clemons & Justin Timberlake	Safe
Kenya & Brandon	24 (6, 6, 6, 6)	Cha-cha-cha	"Hot Stuff" — Donna Summer	Safe
The Miz & Witney	26 (7, 5, 7, 7)	Tango	"Nothin' but a Good Time" — Poison	Safe
Brian & Sharna	23 (6, 5, 6, 6)	Rumba	"Say You Won't Let Go" — James Arthur	Safe
Christine & Pasha	24 (6, 6, 6, 6)	Salsa	"Despacito" — Daddy Yankee & Luis Fonsi	Bottom two
Jimmie & Emma	27 (7, 6, 7, 7)	Rumba	"Make Me Want To" — Jimmie Allen	Safe
Amanda & Alan	32 (8, 8, 8, 8)	Foxtrot	"It Had to Be You" — Ray Chew	Safe
JoJo & Jenna	31 (8, 8, 7, 8)	Cha-cha-cha	"Rain on Me" — Lady Gaga & Ariana Grande	Safe
Iman & Daniella	25 (7, 6, 6, 6)	Rumba	"U Know What's Up" — Donell Jones	Safe
Martin & Britt	15 (4, 3, 4, 4)	Cha-cha-cha	"Twist and Shout" — The Isley Brothers	Eliminated
Melora & Artem	27 (7, 6, 7, 7)	Rumba	"All by Myself" — Celine Dion	Safe
Cody & Cheryl	24 (6, 6, 6, 6)	Salsa	"Don't Go Yet" — Camila Cabello	Safe
Melanie & Gleb	30 (7, 7, 8, 8)	Foxtrot	"Here Comes the Sun" — The Beatles	Safe
Suni & Sasha	28 (7, 7, 7, 7)	Cha-cha-cha	"I Like It" — Cardi B, Bad Bunny & J Balvin	Safe

Judges' votes to save

- Derek: Christine & Pasha
- Bruno: Christine & Pasha
- Carrie Ann: Christine & Pasha
- Len: Did not vote, but would have voted to save Christine & Pasha

=== Week 3: Britney Night ===
Individual judges' scores in the chart below are listed in this order from left to right: Carrie Ann Inaba, Len Goodman, Bruno Tonioli.

The couples performed one unlearned dance to songs by pop artist Britney Spears. Couples are listed in the order they performed.

Due to both Cody Rigsby and Cheryl Burke testing positive for COVID-19 and being in quarantine, their dance was performed via live feed from their respective homes. Derek Hough also missed the live show "out of an abundance of caution" because he had a "possible COVID-19 exposure," although his test came back negative.

Couple	Scores	Dance	Britney Spears music	Result
Amanda & Alan	24 (8, 8, 8)	Cha-cha-cha	"Circus"	Safe
Iman & Daniella	19 (7, 6, 6)	Tango	"Piece of Me"	Safe
Christine & Pasha	21 (7, 7, 7)	Paso doble	"Stronger"	Eliminated
JoJo & Jenna	24 (8, 8, 8)	Argentine tango	"...Baby One More Time"	Safe
Kenya & Brandon	21 (7, 7, 7)	Tango	"Womanizer"	Bottom two
Brian & Sharna	19 (7, 6, 6)	Tango	"Till the World Ends"	Safe
Melora & Artem	23 (8, 7, 8)	Cha-cha-cha	"(You Drive Me) Crazy (The Stop! Remix)"	Safe
Melanie & Gleb	22 (7, 7, 8)	Tango	"Toxic"	Safe
Jimmie & Emma	20 (6, 6, 8)	Salsa	"Outrageous"	Safe
Olivia & Val	24 (8, 8, 8)	Tango	"Hold It Against Me"	Safe
Cody & Cheryl	18 (6, 6, 6)	Jazz	"Gimme More"	Safe
Suni & Sasha	21 (7, 7, 7)	Foxtrot	"I'm a Slave 4 U"	Safe
Matt & Lindsay	20 (7, 6, 7)	Tango	"Scream & Shout" (with will.i.am)	Safe
The Miz & Witney	22 (7, 7, 8)	Salsa	"Oops!... I Did It Again"	Safe

Judges' votes to save

- Bruno: Kenya & Brandon
- Carrie Ann: Kenya & Brandon
- Len: Did not vote, but would have voted to save Christine & Pasha

=== Week 4: Disney Week ===
The couples had to prepare two new dances to be performed on two consecutive nights. On Monday, they performed routines inspired by heroes of Disney films, and on Tuesday, they performed routines inspired by villains. Each couple was also given the Mickey Dance Challenge, where they had to incorporate dance moves that were given to them from Mickey Mouse. The judges decided at the end of the night who they thought incorporated the moves the best in their dance. The winners, Jimmie and Emma, were awarded two extra points. No elimination took place on the first night, but a double elimination occurred on the second night. Couples are listed in the order they performed.

Heroes Night

Couple	Scores	Dance	Music	Disney film
JoJo & Jenna	35 (9, 8, 9, 9)	Viennese waltz	"A Dream Is a Wish Your Heart Makes" — Ilene Woods	Cinderella
Melanie & Gleb	31 (7, 8, 8, 8)	Jazz	"Step in Time" — Dick Van Dyke	Mary Poppins
Matt & Lindsay	26 (6, 6, 7, 7)	Quickstep	"The Incredits" — Michael Giacchino	The Incredibles
Jimmie & Emma	30 (8, 7, 8, 7) + 2 (Note: Jimmie & Emma received two bonus points for winning the Mickey Dance Challenge.)	Paso doble	"I'll Make a Man Out of You" — Donny Osmond	Mulan
Amanda & Alan	32 (8, 8, 8, 8)	Rumba	"You'll Be in My Heart" — Phil Collins	Tarzan
Olivia & Val	35 (8, 9, 9, 9)	Samba	"I Just Can't Wait to Be King" — Jason Weaver, Rowan Atkinson & Laura Williams	The Lion King
The Miz & Witney	31 (8, 7, 8, 8)	Quickstep	"Friend Like Me" — Will Smith	Aladdin
Kenya & Brandon	29 (7, 7, 8, 7)	Contemporary	"How Far I'll Go" — Auliʻi Cravalho	Moana
Brian & Sharna	25 (6, 6, 7, 6)	Waltz	"Someday My Prince Will Come" — Ray Chew	Snow White and the Seven Dwarfs
Suni & Sasha	33 (8, 8, 9, 8)	Salsa	"Colombia, Mi Encanto" — Carlos Vives	Encanto
Melora & Artem	36 (9, 9, 9, 9)	Quickstep	"I Wan'na Be Like You" — Christopher Walken	The Jungle Book
Cody & Cheryl	27 (7, 6, 7, 7)	Jive	"Stand Out" — Tevin Campbell	A Goofy Movie
Iman & Daniella	30 (8, 6, 8, 8)	Foxtrot	"Let It Go" — Idina Menzel	Frozen

Villains Night

Couple	Scores	Dance	Music	Disney film	Result
Jimmie & Emma	35 (9, 8, 9, 9)	Jazz	"Bad Guy" — Billie Eilish	Peter Pan	Safe
Cody & Cheryl	31 (8, 7, 8, 8)	Viennese waltz	"Gaston" — Jesse Corti & Richard White	Beauty and the Beast	Safe
Melanie & Gleb	35 (9, 8, 9, 9)	Viennese waltz	"Once Upon a Dream" — Lana Del Rey	Maleficent	Safe
JoJo & Jenna	35 (8, 9, 9, 9)	Paso doble	"Ways to Be Wicked" — Dove Cameron, Sofia Carson, Cameron Boyce & Booboo Stewart	Descendants 2	Safe
Kenya & Brandon	30 (7, 7, 8, 8)	Viennese waltz	"Dangerous Woman" — Ariana Grande	Snow White and the Seven Dwarfs	Bottom three
Iman & Daniella	33 (9, 7, 9, 8)	Argentine tango	"Arabian Nights" — Bruce Adler	Aladdin	Safe
Melora & Artem	37 (9, 10, 9, 9)	Jazz	"Mother Knows Best" — Melora Hardin	Tangled	Safe
The Miz & Witney	34 (9, 8, 9, 8)	Argentine tango	"Be Prepared" — Chiwetel Ejiofor	The Lion King	Safe
Brian & Sharna	27 (7, 6, 7, 7)	Paso doble	"He's a Pirate" — Klaus Badelt & Hans Zimmer	Pirates of the Caribbean	Eliminated immediately
Matt & Lindsay	31 (8, 7, 8, 8)	Paso doble	"Jungle" — X Ambassadors & Jamie N Commons	The Jungle Book	Eliminated by judges’ votes
Olivia & Val	35 (8, 9, 9, 9)	Jazz	"Remember Me" — Benjamin Bratt	Coco	Safe
Suni & Sasha	35 (9, 8, 9, 9)	Viennese waltz	"I Put a Spell on You" — Annie Lennox	Hocus Pocus	Safe
Amanda & Alan	36 (9, 9, 9, 9)	Paso doble	"Call Me Cruella" — Florence and the Machine	Cruella	Safe

Judges' vote to save

- Bruno: Matt & Lindsay
- Derek: Kenya & Brandon
- Carrie Ann: Matt & Lindsay
- Len: Kenya & Brandon (Since the other judges were not unanimous, Len, as head judge, made the final decision to save Kenya & Brandon.)

=== Week 5: Grease Night ===
The couples performed one unlearned dance to songs from the musical Grease. Couples are listed in the order they performed.

Couple	Scores	Dance	Music from Grease	Result
Olivia & Val	36 (9, 9, 9, 9)	Foxtrot	"Summer Nights" — John Travolta & Olivia Newton-John	Bottom two
Melora & Artem	36 (9, 9, 9, 9)	Viennese waltz	"Look at Me, I'm Sandra Dee" — Stockard Channing, Didi Conn, Dinah Manoff & Jamie Donnelly	Safe
Iman & Daniella	28 (7, 7, 7, 7)	Viennese waltz	"Hopelessly Devoted to You" — Olivia Newton-John	Safe
The Miz & Witney	32 (8, 8, 8, 8)	Jive	"Greased Lightnin'" — John Travolta & Jeff Conaway	Safe
Amanda & Alan	39 (10, 10, 9, 10)	Viennese waltz	"Beauty School Dropout" — Frankie Avalon	Safe
Suni & Sasha	36 (9, 9, 9, 9)	Charleston	"Born to Hand Jive" — Sha Na Na	Safe
Jimmie & Emma	34 (8, 8, 9, 9)	Foxtrot	"Sandy" — John Travolta	Safe
Kenya & Brandon	36 (9, 9, 9, 9)	Rumba	"There Are Worse Things I Could Do" — Stockard Channing	Safe
JoJo & Jenna	40 (10, 10, 10, 10)	Foxtrot	"Look at Me, I'm Sandra Dee (Reprise)" — Olivia Newton-John	Safe
Melanie & Gleb	36 (9, 9, 9, 9)	Quickstep	"You're the One That I Want" — John Travolta & Olivia Newton-John	Eliminated
Cody & Cheryl	32 (8, 8, 8, 8)	Quickstep	"We Go Together" — John Travolta & Olivia Newton-John	Safe

Judges' votes to save

- Derek: Olivia & Val
- Carrie Ann: Melanie & Gleb
- Bruno: Melanie & Gleb
- Len: Olivia & Val (Since the other judges were not unanimous, Len made the final decision to save Olivia & Val.)

=== Week 6: Horror Night ===
The couples performed one unlearned dance inspired by a horror film or television series. Couples are listed in the order they performed.

Couple	Scores	Dance	Music	Horror film/show	Result
The Miz & Witney	34 (9, 8, 9, 8)	Paso doble	"Wicked Games" — RAIGN	Hellraiser	Safe
Kenya & Brandon	32 (8, 8, 8, 8)	Argentine tango	"Take My Breath" — The Weeknd	Arachnophobia	Eliminated
JoJo & Jenna	40 (10, 10, 10, 10)	Jazz	"Anything Goes" — District 78, feat. Patrice Covington	It	Safe
Cody & Cheryl	36 (9, 9, 9, 9)	Cha-cha-cha	"There Will Be Blood" — Kim Petras	American Psycho	Safe
Jimmie & Emma	38 (10, 9, 10, 9)	Contemporary	"Say Something" — Daniel Jang	A Quiet Place	Safe
Olivia & Val	36 (9, 9, 9, 9)	Paso doble	"Beggin'" — Måneskin	The Purge	Safe
Melora & Artem	34 (8, 9, 8, 9)	Jive	"Hound Dog" — Elvis Presley	Cujo	Safe
Iman & Daniella	40 (10, 10, 10, 10)	Contemporary	"I Got 5 on It (Tethered Mix)" — Luniz, feat. Michael Marshall	Us	Safe
Suni & Sasha	36 (9, 9, 9, 9)	Tango	"Bad Habits" — Ed Sheeran	The Vampire Diaries	Bottom two
Amanda & Alan	38 (9, 9, 10, 10)	Argentine tango	"Paint It Black" — Ciara	Saw	Safe

Judges' votes to save

- Carrie Ann: Suni & Sasha
- Derek: Suni & Sasha
- Bruno: Suni & Sasha
- Len: Did not vote, but would have voted to save Suni & Sasha

=== Week 7: Queen Night ===
The couples performed one unlearned dance, and a dance relay with two other couples for extra points, to songs by Queen. Couples are listed in the order they performed.

Couple	Scores	Dance	Queen music	Result
Amanda & Alan	33 (8, 8, 8, 9)	Jive	"Don't Stop Me Now"	Safe
Olivia & Val	38 (10, 8, 10, 10)	Quickstep	"Fat Bottomed Girls"	Safe
Iman & Daniella	32 (9, 7, 8, 8)	Paso doble	"Another One Bites the Dust"	Safe
Jimmie & Emma	38 (9, 9, 10, 10)	Viennese waltz	"Somebody to Love"	Safe
The Miz & Witney	32 (8, 8, 8, 8)	Foxtrot	"Radio Ga Ga''	Eliminated
JoJo & Jenna	39 (10, 9, 10, 10)	Tango	"Body Language"	Bottom two
Suni & Sasha	33 (8, 8, 8, 9)	Paso doble	"We Will Rock You"	Safe
Cody & Cheryl	34 (8, 8, 9, 9)	Foxtrot	"You're My Best Friend"	Safe
Melora & Artem	36 (9, 9, 9, 9)	Foxtrot	"Killer Queen"	Safe
The Miz & Witney	0	Jive; Relay	"Crazy Little Thing Called Love"	
Iman & Daniella	2 (Note: Iman & Daniella received points from Carrie Ann and Derek.)	Jive; Relay	"Crazy Little Thing Called Love"	
Cody & Cheryl	2 (Note: Cody & Cheryl received points from Len and Bruno.)	Jive; Relay	"Crazy Little Thing Called Love"	
JoJo & Jenna	0	Foxtrot; Relay	"Under Pressure" (with David Bowie)	
Olivia & Val	4 (Note: Olivia & Val received points from all four judges.)	Foxtrot; Relay	"Under Pressure" (with David Bowie)	
Jimmie & Emma	0	Foxtrot; Relay	"Under Pressure" (with David Bowie)	
Amanda & Alan	1 (Note: Amanda & Alan received one point from Derek.)	Viennese waltz Relay	"We Are the Champions"	
Suni & Sasha	1 (Note: Suni & Sasha received one point from Carrie Ann.)	Viennese waltz Relay	"We Are the Champions"	
Melora & Artem	2 (Note: Melora & Artem received points from Len and Bruno.)	Viennese waltz Relay	"We Are the Champions"	

Notes

Judges' votes to save

- Bruno: JoJo & Jenna
- Carrie Ann: JoJo & Jenna
- Derek: JoJo & Jenna
- Len: Did not vote, but would have voted to save JoJo & Jenna

=== Week 8: Janet Jackson Night ===
The couples performed one unlearned dance, and a dance-off for two extra points, to songs by Janet Jackson. Two couples were sent home at the end of the night in a double elimination. Couples are listed in the order they performed.

Couple	Scores	Dance	Janet Jackson music	Result
Jimmie & Emma	32 (8, 8, 8, 8)	Cha-cha-cha	"Escapade"	Eliminated by judges’ votes
Suni & Sasha	40 (10, 10, 10, 10)	Samba	"All for You"	Safe
Melora & Artem	40 (10, 10, 10, 10)	Paso doble	"If"	Bottom three
Olivia & Val	36 (9, 9, 9, 9)	Argentine tango	"Any Time, Any Place"	Eliminated immediately
Cody & Cheryl	38 (10, 10, 9, 9)	Paso doble	"Black Cat"	Safe
Amanda & Alan	40 (10, 10, 10, 10)	Jazz	"Miss You Much"	Safe
Iman & Daniella	35 (9, 8, 9, 9)	Cha-cha-cha	"Rhythm Nation"	Safe
JoJo & Jenna	39 (10, 9, 10, 10)	Salsa	"Feedback"	Safe

Dance-offs
Couple	Judge	Dance	Janet Jackson music	Result
Suni & Sasha	Bruno Tonioli	Salsa	"Made for Now (Latin version)" (with Daddy Yankee)	Winners
Jimmie & Emma	Bruno Tonioli	Salsa	"Made for Now (Latin version)" (with Daddy Yankee)	Losers
JoJo & Jenna	Carrie Ann Inaba	Rumba	"That's the Way Love Goes"	Winners
Olivia & Val	Carrie Ann Inaba	Rumba	"That's the Way Love Goes"	Losers
Melora & Artem	Derek Hough	Foxtrot	"Again"	Winners
Iman & Daniella	Derek Hough	Foxtrot	"Again"	Losers
Amanda & Alan	Len Goodman	Cha-cha-cha	"Together Again"	Winners
Cody & Cheryl	Len Goodman	Cha-cha-cha	"Together Again"	Losers

Judges' votes to save

- Derek: Melora & Artem
- Bruno: Melora & Artem
- Carrie Ann: Melora & Artem
- Len: Did not vote, but would have voted to save Melora & Artem

=== Week 9: Semifinals ===
During the first round, the couples performed a redemption dance to a new song that was coached by one of the four judges. In the second round, they performed one unlearned dance. Two couples were sent home at the end of the night in a double elimination. Couples are listed in the order they performed.

Couple	Judge	Scores	Dance	Music	Result
Cody & Cheryl	Bruno Tonioli	35 (9, 9, 8, 9)	Salsa	"Danza Kuduro" — Don Omar & Lucenzo	Safe
Cody & Cheryl	Bruno Tonioli	36 (9, 9, 9, 9)	Argentine tango	"La cumparsita" — Forever Tango	Safe
Melora & Artem	Len Goodman	36 (8, 10, 9, 9)	Rumba	"I Don't Want to Wait" — Paula Cole	Eliminated immediately
Melora & Artem	Len Goodman	36 (9, 9, 9, 9)	Contemporary	"Thunder" — Imagine Dragons	Eliminated immediately
Suni & Sasha	Carrie Ann Inaba	37 (10, 9, 9, 9)	Foxtrot	"Haven't Met You Yet" — Michael Bublé	Eliminated by judges' votes
Suni & Sasha	Carrie Ann Inaba	38 (10, 9, 10, 9)	Contemporary	"Gravity" — Sara Bareilles	Eliminated by judges' votes
JoJo & Jenna	Len Goodman	40 (10, 10, 10, 10)	Argentine tango	"Santa María (del Buen Ayre)" — Gotan Project	Safe
JoJo & Jenna	Len Goodman	40 (10, 10, 10, 10)	Contemporary	"Before You Go" (piano version) — Lewis Capaldi	Safe
Iman & Daniella	Derek Hough	37 (9, 9, 10, 9)	Tango	"Telephone" — Martynas	Safe
Iman & Daniella	Derek Hough	38 (10, 9, 10, 9)	Jazz	"Dark Fantasy" — Kanye West	Safe
Amanda & Alan	Len Goodman	39 (9, 10, 10, 10)	Tango	"Titanium" — David Guetta, feat. Sia	Bottom three
Amanda & Alan	Len Goodman	40 (10, 10, 10, 10)	Contemporary	"Live Your Life" — Lenii	Bottom three

Judges' votes to save

- Carrie Ann: Amanda & Alan
- Derek: Amanda & Alan
- Bruno: Amanda & Alan
- Len: Did not vote, but would have voted to save Amanda & Alan

=== Week 10: Finale ===
Individual judges' scores in the chart below are listed in this order from left to right: Carrie Ann Inaba, Len Goodman, Julianne Hough, Bruno Tonioli.

During the first round, the couples performed a fusion dance of two dance styles. In the second round, the couples performed their freestyle routine. Couples are listed in the order they performed.

Because Derek Hough tested positive for COVID-19, Julianne Hough filled in as guest judge.

Couple	Scores	Dance	Music	Result
Amanda & Alan	38 (9, 10, 9, 10)	Paso doble & Viennese waltz	"Never Tear Us Apart" — Bishop Briggs	Fourth place
Amanda & Alan	40 (10, 10, 10, 10)	Freestyle	"A Sky Full of Stars" — Coldplay	Fourth place
Cody & Cheryl	36 (9, 9, 9, 9)	Cha-cha-cha & Paso doble	"Free Your Mind" — En Vogue	Third place
Cody & Cheryl	40 (10, 10, 10, 10)	Freestyle	"Symphony No. 5" — Ludwig van Beethoven & "Nails, Hair, Hips, Heels (Just Dance version)" — Todrick Hall	Third place
JoJo & Jenna	40 (10, 10, 10, 10)	Cha-cha-cha & Tango	"I Love It" — Icona Pop, featuring Charli XCX	Runners-up
JoJo & Jenna	40 (10, 10, 10, 10)	Freestyle	"Born This Way" — Lady Gaga	Runners-up
Iman & Daniella	40 (10, 10, 10, 10)	Cha-cha-cha & Foxtrot	"September" — Earth, Wind & Fire	Winners
Iman & Daniella	40 (10, 10, 10, 10)	Freestyle	"Lose Control" — Missy Elliott, feat. Ciara & Fat Man Scoop & "Bounce" — DJ Clent	Winners

== Dance chart ==
The couples performed the following each week:

- Week 1: One unlearned dance
- Week 2: One unlearned dance
- Week 3: One unlearned dance
- Week 4 (Night 1): One unlearned dance
- Week 4 (Night 2): One unlearned dance
- Week 5: One unlearned dance
- Week 6: One unlearned dance
- Week 7: One unlearned dance & dance relay
- Week 8: One unlearned dance & dance-off
- Week 9 (Semifinals): One dance & redemption dance
- Week 10 (Finale): Fusion dance & freestyle

Dancing with the Stars (season 30) - Dance chart
Couple	Week														
Couple	1	2	3	4		5	6	7		8		9		10	
Couple	1	2	3	Night 1	Night 2	5	6	7		8		9		10	
Iman & Daniella	Jive	Rumba	Tango	Foxtrot	Argentine tango	Viennese waltz	Contemp.	Paso doble	Jive	Cha-cha-cha	Foxtrot	Tango	Jazz	Cha-cha-cha & Foxtrot	Freestyle
JoJo & Jenna	Quickstep	Cha-cha-cha	Argentine tango	Viennese waltz	Paso doble	Foxtrot	Jazz	Tango	Foxtrot	Salsa	Rumba	Argentine tango	Contemp.	Cha-cha-cha & Tango	Freestyle
Cody & Cheryl	Tango	Salsa	Jazz	Jive	Viennese waltz	Quickstep	Cha-cha-cha	Foxtrot	Jive	Paso doble	Cha-cha-cha	Salsa	Argentine tango	Cha-cha-cha & Paso doble	Freestyle
Amanda & Alan	Tango	Foxtrot	Cha-cha-cha	Rumba	Paso doble	Viennese waltz	Argentine tango	Jive	Viennese waltz	Jazz	Cha-cha-cha	Tango	Contemp.	Paso doble & Viennese waltz	Freestyle
Suni & Sasha	Jive	Cha-cha-cha	Foxtrot	Salsa	Viennese waltz	Charleston	Tango	Paso doble	Viennese waltz	Samba	Salsa	Foxtrot	Contemp.		
Melora & Artem	Tango	Rumba	Cha-cha-cha	Quickstep	Jazz	Viennese waltz	Jive	Foxtrot	Viennese waltz	Paso doble	Foxtrot	Rumba	Contemp.		
Jimmie & Emma	Tango	Rumba	Salsa	Paso doble	Jazz	Foxtrot	Contemp.	Viennese waltz	Foxtrot	Cha-cha-cha	Salsa				
Olivia & Val	Salsa	Viennese waltz	Tango	Samba	Jazz	Foxtrot	Paso doble	Quickstep	Foxtrot	Argentine tango	Rumba				
The Miz & Witney	Cha-cha-cha	Tango	Salsa	Quickstep	Argentine tango	Jive	Paso doble	Foxtrot	Jive						
Kenya & Brandon	Foxtrot	Cha-cha-cha	Tango	Contemp.	Viennese waltz	Rumba	Argentine tango								
Melanie & Gleb	Cha-cha-cha	Foxtrot	Tango	Jazz	Viennese waltz	Quickstep									
Matt & Lindsay	Cha-cha-cha	Samba	Tango	Quickstep	Paso doble										
Brian & Sharna	Foxtrot	Rumba	Tango	Waltz	Paso doble										
Christine & Pasha	Tango	Salsa	Paso doble												
Martin & Britt	Paso doble	Cha-cha-cha													
