= Cody Rigsby =

American fitness instructor and television show contestant

- Born: June 8, 1987 (age 39); California, US
- Education: University of North Carolina at Greensboro
- Occupation: Fitness instructor
- Employer: Peloton Interactive, Inc.

Cody Rigsby (born June 8, 1987) is an American fitness instructor, dancer, and television personality.

== Early life ==
Rigsby was born in California but raised in Greensboro, North Carolina. In his freshman year of college at the University of North Carolina at Greensboro, he began attending ballet classes at a community theatre. He travelled to New York City after a friend told him about an internship at a dance school.

Rigsby returned to Greensboro in the fall, where he came out as gay to his peers. He permanently moved to New York City in 2009.

== Career ==
After graduating from college, Rigsby danced for multiple night clubs and gay bars; he also worked for Katy Perry, Pitbull, and Saturday Night Live. He danced backup for Nicki Minaj during the 2011 Victoria's Secret Fashion Show.

While working at The Box Manhattan, a burlesque club, a choreographer told him about Peloton, a fitness company that was looking to hire performers. Rigsby sent in an application and was hired shortly after. Rigsby established an international following, which includes former British PM Rishi Sunak.

In 2021, Rigsby competed on the 30th season of Dancing with the Stars and was paired with professional dancer Cheryl Burke. Rigsby and Burke ultimately placed third.

== Personal life ==
Rigsby is openly gay.
