= Amanda Kloots =

American television personality, dancer and fitness instructor

- Born: March 19, 1982 (age 44); Canton, Ohio, U.S.
- Other name: Amanda Kloots-Larsen
- Occupations: Television personality; dancer; model; fitness instructor
- Years active: 2000-present
- Height: 1.78 m (5 ft 10 in)
- Spouses: David Larsen (divorced) Nick Cordero (m. 2017; died 2020)
- Children: 1
- Website: amandakloots.com

Amanda Kloots (born March 19, 1982) is an American television personality, dancer, model, actress, and fitness instructor. From 2021 to 2024, she was a co-host of the daytime talk show The Talk.

== Early life ==
Kloots is the second youngest of five children. She attended GlenOak High School in Plain Township, Stark County, Ohio.

== Career ==
Kloots performed as part of the ensemble in several musicals on Broadway, including Good Vibrations, Follies, Young Frankenstein, and Bullets Over Broadway. She is a former member of the dance company the Rockettes.

In 2020, Kloots launched a digital fitness brand, which includes exercise videos taught by her. That same year, she served as a guest co-host on the CBS daytime talk show The Talk. Kloots joined The Talk as a permanent co-host in January 2021. She released a memoir, co-authored with her sister, titled Live Your Life, in June 2021. Later that year, she participated as one of the celebrities competing on season 30 of the competition series Dancing with the Stars, ultimately placing fourth.

== Personal life ==
Kloots was married to actor David Larsen for six years. She met actor Nick Cordero while working on Bullets Over Broadway. They were married from 2017 until his death from COVID-19 in 2020. She received attention for documenting Cordero's struggle and death from COVID-related complications on Instagram. The couple had a son born 10 June 2019 via C-section. Kloots lives in Los Angeles.

Kloots endorsed Joe Biden in the 2020 United States presidential election.

== Filmography ==
=== Film ===
Year	Title	Role	Notes
2015	Ted 2	Dancer	Uncredited
2019	The Irishman	Golddigger Dancer	
2022	Fit for Christmas	Audrey	Television film Also executive producer

=== Television ===
Year	Title	Role	Notes	Ref.
2020–2024	The Talk	Herself / co-host	Talk show	
2021	Dancing with the Stars	Herself / Contestant	Season 30	
2023	The Neighborhood	Herself	Episode: "Welcome to the Milestone"	
2024	The Bold and the Beautiful	Lucy	2 episodes	
2024	Blue Bloods	Deanne	Episode “Entitlement”	
2026	Let's Marry Harry	Herself		

=== Awards and nominations ===
Year	Award	Category	Nominated work	Result
2023	Daytime Emmy Awards	Outstanding Daytime Talk Series Host (shared with the other hosts)	The Talk	Nominated
2024	Daytime Emmy Awards	Outstanding Daytime Talk Series Host (shared with the other hosts)	The Talk	Nominated

== Theatre credits ==
Year	Title	Role	Venue	Ref.
2014	Bullets Over Broadway	Ensemble (credited as Amanda Kloots-Larsen)	St. James Theatre	
2011	Follies	Ensemble	Marquis Theatre	
2008	Young Frankenstein	Ensemble (replacement)	Lyric Theatre	
2005	Good Vibrations	Bikini Girl/Ensemble	Eugene O'Neill Theatre	

Media offices
Preceded by Marie Osmond	The Talk co-host 2021-2024	Incumbent
