= Cheryl Burke =

American dancer, model and television host (born 1984)

- Burke in 2013
- Born: Stephanie Burke; May 3, 1984 (age 42); San Francisco, California, U.S.
- Occupations: Dancer; model; television host
- Years active: 1988–present
- Spouse: Matthew Lawrence (m. 2019; div. 2022)

Cheryl Stephanie Burke (born Stephanie Burke; May 3, 1984) is an American professional dancer, model, and television host. She is best known for her appearances on the ABC competition series Dancing with the Stars, which she performed on for twenty-six seasons. Burke is the first female pro to win the series, as well as the first pro to win two consecutive seasons.

Outside of Dancing with the Stars, Burke finished in second place on the NBC series I Can Do That (2015). She later replaced Abby Lee Miller as the main dance coach on Dance Moms (2017).

== Early life ==
Stephanie Burke was born on May 3, 1984, in San Francisco, California, to Stephen Louis Burke (1950–2018) and Sherri Burke, a nurse and entrepreneur. Her father was Ashkenazi Jewish, while her mother is Filipina. When Burke was still an infant, her parents divorced and her father eventually moved to Thailand. Her mother later remarried and established a healthcare company. Burke legally changed her name to Cheryl in middle school after she was bullied by a classmate who shared her birth name. She later attended Menlo-Atherton High School.

== Dancing with the Stars ==
Burke joined Dancing with the Stars in its second season and won her first mirror ball trophy with 98 Degrees member Drew Lachey. She won her second championship with retired football star Emmitt Smith in the third season. Burke returned on March 19, 2007, for season four, partnered with actor Ian Ziering. She and Ziering were eliminated in the semifinals on May 15, 2007.

Burke participated in a 38-city Dancing with the Stars tour from December 19, 2006, to February 11, 2007. She also joined the second summer tour, which visited 24 cities between June 20, 2007, in Austin, Texas, and July 24, 2007, in Vancouver, British Columbia. Lachey was her celebrity partner for each tour. Burke competed on season 5 with Las Vegas entertainer Wayne Newton. They were the third couple eliminated from the competition, on October 9, 2007.

Burke participated with both Lachey and Newton in the Dancing with the Stars winter tour that began on December 18, 2007, in Seattle, Washington. The tour ended in Philadelphia on February 10, 2008. Burke competed on season 6 with actor Cristián de la Fuente. They trained at the Paramount Ballroom in Palm Beach, Florida. They made it to the finals and on May 20, 2008, placed third.

Burke returned to the show for season 7 with partner Maurice Greene. They were eliminated in week 8 on November 11, 2008, and finished in fifth place. She returned to the show's eighth season with actor Gilles Marini. They finished as runners-up, losing to Shawn Johnson and Mark Ballas. Burke competed on the ninth season with former U.S. House of Representatives Majority Leader Tom DeLay. On October 6, 2009, they withdrew from the competition because DeLay had stress fractures in both feet.

For Toy Story 3, Burke choreographed the paso doble with Tony Dovolani and did a performance accompanied by the Gipsy Kings live. She also made a fitness video based on Latin dances with Maksim Chmerkovskiy as co-instructors.

In season ten, she was partnered with Chad Ochocinco. They were eliminated in the semi-finals and came in fourth place. Rick Fox was partnered with Burke in the show's eleventh season. They were eliminated in the seventh week of the competition and came in sixth place. For the twelfth season, she was partnered with wrestler Chris Jericho. They were eliminated in the sixth week of the competition. In the thirteenth season, Burke was partnered with reality star Rob Kardashian. They came in second place, losing to J. R. Martinez and Karina Smirnoff. In the fourteenth season, Cheryl Burke was partnered with actor William Levy. The couple made it to the finals and finished in third place.

In season 15, Burke returned with former partner and season 3 Champion, Emmitt Smith for a chance to win another mirrorball trophy. They were eliminated in the semi-finals. For season 16, Burke was partnered with comedian D. L. Hughley, finishing in ninth place after being eliminated in the fifth week of competition. During week 8, she danced a Paso Doble with Jacoby Jones and Karina Smirnoff in the trio challenge. For season 17, she was partnered with media personality Jack Osbourne. Osbourne's struggle with multiple sclerosis was a source of inspiration to Burke. They made it to the finals and came in third place.

For season 18, she was paired with game show host and actor Drew Carey. They were eliminated on week 6 and ended in eighth place. For season 19, she was paired with soap star Antonio Sabàto Jr. The couple was eliminated on week 7 and finished in eighth place. After season 19, Burke chose to leave DWTS for some time after her contract expired to pursue other projects.

On August 30, 2016, it was announced that Burke would be returning to the show to compete on season 23. She was partnered with Olympic swimmer Ryan Lochte. After a season off, Burke again returned for season 25, her 20th season as a pro. She was paired with former NFL wide receiver Terrell Owens and finished in sixth place. After taking another season off, she returned once again for season 27 where she was paired with actor Juan Pablo Di Pace. Despite having earned five perfect scores and holding the highest average of the season, they were eliminated in the semi-finals.

Burke returned again for season 28 where she was partnered with former NFL linebacker Ray Lewis. However, on week 3, the couple withdrew from the competition due to Lewis suffering a torn tendon in his foot. For season 29, she was partnered with Backstreet Boys singer AJ McLean, coming in seventh place. For season 30, Burke was partnered with Peloton instructor Cody Rigsby, they reached the finals and were placed third. She was partnered with Good Morning America meteorologist Sam Champion for season 31. On November 20, 2022, it was announced that Burke would retire as a pro dancer on the show after season 31 finale. On October 28, 2025, Burke returned as a guest judge on Halloween Night during season 34.

Season	Partner	Place	Average Score
2	Drew Lachey	1st	27.73
3	Emmitt Smith	1st	26.80
4	Ian Ziering	4th	24.83
5	Wayne Newton	10th	17.30
6	Cristián de la Fuente	3rd	25.21
7	Maurice Greene	5th	22.91
8	Gilles Marini	2nd	28.06
9	Tom DeLay	13th	16.33
10	Chad Ochocinco	4th	22.23
11	Rick Fox	6th	22.77
12	Chris Jericho	7th	22.33
13	Rob Kardashian	2nd	25.13
14	William Levy	3rd	27.47
15	Emmitt Smith	4th	26.75
16	D.L. Hughley	9th	16.60
17	Jack Osbourne	3rd	26.06
18	Drew Carey	8th	22.00
19	Antonio Sabàto Jr.	8th	21.47
23	Ryan Lochte	7th	21.75
25	Terrell Owens	6th	22.82
27	Juan Pablo Di Pace	5th	27.55
28	Ray Lewis	11th	15.00
29	AJ McLean	7th	22.89
30	Cody Rigsby	3rd	24.06
31	Sam Champion	13th	18.00

=== Performances ===
==== Season 2: Celebrity Partner Drew Lachey ====
- Average: 27.7
- Placed: 1st

Week #	Dance/Song	Judges' score			Total	Result
Week #	Dance/Song	Inaba	Goodman	Tonioli	Total	Result
1	Cha-cha-cha/ "She Bangs"	8	8	8	24	Safe
2	Quickstep/ "Neutron Dance"	9	9	9	27	Safe
3	Jive/ "Crazy Little Thing Called Love"	9	9	9	27	Safe
4	Paso Doble/ "Thriller"	9	9	10	28	Safe
5	Samba/ "Dirrty"	9	9	9	27	Safe
6	Tango/ "Shut Up"	10	10	10	30	Safe
7 Semi-finals	Foxtrot/ "It Had to Be You"	9	9	8	55 (26 + 29	Safe
7 Semi-finals	Rumba/ "Total Eclipse of the Heart"	10	9	10	55 (26 + 29	Safe
8 Finals	Paso Doble/ "Thriller"	10	10	10	87 (30 + 30 + 27)	WON
8 Finals	Freestyle/ "Save a Horse (Ride a Cowboy)"	10	10	10	87 (30 + 30 + 27)	WON
8 Finals	Jive/ "Hound Dog"	9	9	9	87 (30 + 30 + 27)	WON

==== Season 3: Celebrity Partner Emmitt Smith ====
- Average: 26.8
- Placed: 1st

Week #	Dance/Song	Judges' score			Result	Total
Week #	Dance/Song	Inaba	Goodman	Tonioli	Result	Total
1	Cha-cha-cha/ "Son of a Preacher Man"	8	8	8	24	Safe
2	Quickstep/ "Black Horse and the Cherry Tree"	8	8	8	24	Safe
3	Tango/ "Simply Irresistible"	7	6	6	19	Safe
4	Paso Doble/ "España cañí"	8	8	8	24	Safe
5	Samba/ "Cha Cha"	9	9	9	27	Safe
6	Jive/ "Lewis Boogie Blues"	8	8	9	25	No Elimination
7	Waltz/ "Hushabye Mountain"	10	9	9	57 (28 + 29)	Safe
7	Mambo/ "Que Bueno Baila Usted"	10	10	9	57 (28 + 29)	Safe
8	Foxtrot/ "Witchcraft"	8	8	9	54 (25 + 29)	Safe
8	Rumba/ "Spooky"	9	10	10	54 (25 + 29)	Safe
9 Semi-finals	Waltz/ "At This Moment"	9	10	10	59 (29 + 30)	Bottom Two
9 Semi-finals	Cha-Cha-Cha/ "Dance to the Music"	10	10	10	59 (29 + 30)	Bottom Two
10; Finals	Samba/ "Sir Duke"	10	10	10	89 (30 + 30 + 29)	WON
10; Finals	Mambo/ "Que Bueno Baila Usted"	10	10	10	89 (30 + 30 + 29)	WON
10; Finals	Freestyle/ "U Can't Touch This"	10	10	9	89 (30 + 30 + 29)	WON

==== Season 4: Celebrity Partner Ian Ziering ====
- Average: 24.8
- Placed: 4th

Week #	Dance/Song	Judges' score			Result	Total
Week #	Dance/Song	Inaba	Goodman	Tonioli	Result	Total
1	Cha-cha-cha/ "Mony Mony"	7	7	7	21	No elimination
2	Quickstep/ "Don't Get Me Wrong"	7	8	7	22	Safe
3	Jive/ "Hard Headed Woman"	8	8	8	24	Safe
4	Waltz/ "He Was Beautiful"	7	9	8	24	Safe
5	Samba/ "Dance Like This"	8	8	8	24	Safe
6	Paso Doble/ "Waiting for Tonight"	8	8	8	24	Safe
7	Tango/ "Holding Out for a Hero"	9	9	9	54 (27+ + 27)	Safe
7	Mambo/ "Gimme the Light"	9	9	9	54 (27+ + 27)	Safe
8	Foxtrot/ "Baby, It's Cold Outside"	8	7	7	47 (22 + 25)	Safe
8	Rumba/ "Imagine"	8	8	9	47 (22 + 25)	Safe
9 Semi-finals	Tango/ "Maneater"	9	10	9	58 (28 + 30)	Eliminated
9 Semi-finals	Jive/ "All Shook Up"	10	10	10	58 (28 + 30)	Eliminated

==== Season 5: Celebrity Partner Wayne Newton ====
- Average: 17.3
- Placed: 10th

Week #	Dance/Song	Judges' score			Result	Result
Week #	Dance/Song	Inaba	Goodman	Tonioli	Result	Result
1	Cha-cha-cha/ "You're the First, the Last, My Everything"	6	7	6	19	Safe
2	Quickstep / "Viva Las Vegas"	5	5	5	15	Bottom two
3	Tango / "La Cumparsita"	6	6	6	18	Eliminated

==== Season 6: Celebrity Partner Cristián de la Fuente ====
- Average: 25.2
- Placed: 3rd

Week #	Dance/Song	Judges' score			Result	Total
Week #	Dance/Song	Inaba	Goodman	Tonioli	Result	Total
1	Cha-cha-cha/ "Bang Bang"	7	7	7	21	No Elimination
2	Quickstep/ "Americano"	7	6	7	20	Last To Be Called Safe
3	Jive/ "Don't Stop Me Now"	8	8	9	25	Safe
4	Paso Doble/ "La Virgen de la Macarena"	9	8	9	26	Safe
5	Rumba/ "If You're Not the One"	7	8	8	23	Bottom Two
6	Foxtrot/ "Come Fly with Me"	9	9	9	27	Safe
7	Viennese Waltz/ "I'll Make Love to You"; Samba/ "Sobe Son"	8; 7	8; 7	9; 7	46 (25 + 21)	Safe
8	Tango/ "Beat It"; Mambo/ "Saca Tu Mujer"	10; 10	9; 9	9; 10	57 (28 + 29)	Safe
9 Semi-finals	Viennese Waltz/ "Satellite"; Samba/ "Sweetheart From Venezuela"	9; 10	9; 9	9; 10	56 (27 + 29)	Last To Be Called Safe
10; Finals	Cha-Cha-Cha/ "Dancing on the Ceiling"; Freestyle/ "Suavemente"	8; 9	9; 8	9; 9	52 (26 + 26)	Third Place

==== Season 7: Celebrity Partner Maurice Greene ====
- Average: 22.9
- Placed: 5th

Week #	Dance/Song	Judges' score			Result	Total
Week #	Dance/Song	Inaba	Goodman	Tonioli	Result	Total
1	Foxtrot/ "Doing it to Death"	6	6	6	39 (18 + 21)	Safe
1	Mambo/ "I Do the Jerk"	7	7	7	39 (18 + 21)	Safe
2	Rumba/ "Mercy Mercy Me"	7	6	6	19	Safe
3	Jive/ "Rock Around the Clock"	8	8	8	24	Safe
4	Samba/ "That's the Way (I Like It)"	6	7	7	20	Safe
5	Salsa/ "Everything I Can't Have"	9	9	9	27	Safe
6	Viennese Waltz/ "Gravity"	7	7*	7	21	Safe
7	Cha-cha-cha/ "Cupid Shuffle"	8	9	8	54 (25 + 29)	Safe
7	Team Paso Doble/ "Rocks"	10	9	10	54 (25 + 29)	Safe
8	Quickstep/ "Puttin' on the Ritz"	8	8	8	{48 (24 + 24)	Eliminated
8	Paso Doble/ "Let It Rock"	8	8	8	{48 (24 + 24)	Eliminated

- Score was awarded by stand in judge Michael Flatley.

==== Season 8: Celebrity Partner Gilles Marini ====
- Average: 28.1
- Placed: 2nd

Week #	Dance/Song	Judges' score			Result	Total
Week #	Dance/Song	Inaba	Goodman	Tonioli	Result	Total
1	Cha-cha-cha/ "Addicted to Love"	8	8	8	24	No elimination
2	Quickstep/ "Kryptonite"	9	9	9	27	Safe
3	Samba/ "El Matador"	9	9	9	27	Safe
4	Argentine Tango/ "Assassin's Tango"	10	10	10	30	Safe
5	Paso Doble/ "Habanera"	10	9	10	29	Safe
6	Jive/ "Dance, Dance"	9	8	9	26	Safe
7	Viennese Waltz/ "I Go to Sleep"	9	9	9	27	Safe
8	Lindy Hop/ "Go Daddy-O"	9	9	9	55 (27 + 28)	Safe
8	Team Tango/ "Womanizer"	9	9	10	55 (27 + 28)	Safe
9	Foxtrot/ "Fever"	10	9	10	56 (29 + 27)	Safe
9	Rumba/ "Sexual Healing"	9	9	9	56 (29 + 27)	Safe
10; Semi-finals	Waltz/ "Come Away with Me"	10	10	10	60 (30 + 30)	Safe
10; Semi-finals	Salsa/ "I Know You Want Me (Calle Ocho)"	10	10	10	60 (30 + 30)	Safe
11; Finals	Paso Doble/ "So What"	10	10	10	88 (30 + 28 + 30)	Second Place
11; Finals	Freestyle/ "Flashdance (What a Feeling)"	9	10	9	88 (30 + 28 + 30)	Second Place
11; Finals	Argentine Tango/ "Assassin's Tango"	10	10	10	88 (30 + 28 + 30)	Second Place

==== Season 9: Celebrity Partner Tom DeLay ====
- Average: 16.3
- Placed: 13th

Week #	Dance/Song	Judges' score			Total	Result
Week #	Dance/Song	Inaba	Goodman	Tonioli	Total	Result
1	Cha-Cha-Cha/"Wild Thing"	6	5	5	20 (16 + 4)	Safe
1	Viennese Waltz Relay/"I Am Your Man"	Awarded	4	Points	20 (16 + 4)	Safe
2	Tango/"Por una Cabeza"	6	6*	6	18	Safe
3	Samba/"Why Can't We Be Friends?"	6	4	5	15	Withdrew

- Score was awarded by stand in judge Baz Luhrmann.

==== Season 10: Celebrity Partner Chad Ochocinco ====
- Average: 22.2
- Placed: 4th

Week #	Dance/Song	Judges' score			Total	Result
Week #	Dance/Song	Inaba	Goodman	Tonioli	Total	Result
1	Cha-Cha-Cha/"It's Just Begun"	6	6	6	18	No Elimination
2	Foxtrot/"100 Years"	6	5	5	16	Safe
3	Paso Doble/"Cancion Del Mariachi"	7	6	7	20	Safe
4 (Technique Score + Performance Score)	Rumba/"Try Sleeping with a Broken Heart"	7	6	8	44 (21 + 23)	Safe
4 (Technique Score + Performance Score)	Rumba/"Try Sleeping with a Broken Heart"	8	7	8	44 (21 + 23)	Safe
5	Quickstep/"The Bare Necessities"	6	6	6	18	Safe
6	Argentine Tango/"El Sonido De La Milonga"	8	8	8	31 (24 + 7)	Safe
6	Swing Marathon/"In The Mood"	Awarded	7	Points	31 (24 + 7)	Safe
7	Viennese Waltz/"Sparks"; Team Cha-Cha-Cha/"Telephone"	8	9	8	52 (25 + 27)	Safe
7	Viennese Waltz/"Sparks"; Team Cha-Cha-Cha/"Telephone"	9	9	9	52 (25 + 27)	Safe
8	Tango/"Sweet Dreams"	7	7	7	45 (21 + 24)	Last To Be Called Safe
8	60s' Jive/"Love Man"	8	8	8	45 (21 + 24)	Last To Be Called Safe
9 Semi-finals	Waltz/"If You Don't Know Me By Now"	9	9	9	52 (27 + 25)	Eliminated
9 Semi-finals	Samba/"Alejandro"	8	8	9	52 (27 + 25)	Eliminated

==== Season 11: Celebrity Partner Rick Fox ====
- Average: 22.3
- Placed: 6th

Week #	Dance/Song	Judges' score			Total	Result
Week #	Dance/Song	Inaba	Goodman	Tonioli	Total	Result
1	Viennese Waltz/"Crazy"	8	7	7	22	Safe
2	Jive/"Tush"	7	7	7	21	Safe
3	Samba/"Whine Up"	8	8	8	24	Safe
4 (Technique Score + Performance Score)	Argentine Tango/"Violentango"	6	7	6	39 (19 + 20)	Safe
4 (Technique Score + Performance Score)	Argentine Tango/"Violentango"	6	7	7	39 (19 + 20)	Safe
5	Rumba/"Hill Street Blues Theme"	8	8	8	24	Last to be called safe
6	Tango/"You Really Got Me"	8	8	8	30 (24 + 6)	Safe
6	Rock N' Roll marathon/"La Grange"	Awarded	6	Points	30 (24 + 6)	Safe
7	Team Cha-Cha-Cha/"Workin' Day and Night"	8	8	8	61 (24 + 37)	Eliminated
7	Quickstep/"Hey Pachuco"	9	9; 10*	9	61 (24 + 37)	Eliminated

- Score was awarded by stand in judge Hélio Castroneves.

==== Season 12: Celebrity Partner Chris Jericho ====
- Average: 22.3
- Placed: 7th

Week #	Dance/Song/Musician(s)	Judges' score			Total	Result
Week #	Dance/Song/Musician(s)	Inaba	Goodman	Tonioli	Total	Result
1	Cha-Cha-Cha/"Should I Stay or Should I Go"	7	6	6	19	No Elimination
2	Quickstep/"I Got Rhythm"	8	7	8	23	Safe
3	Rumba/"Let It Be"	7	7	7	21	Last to be called safe
4	Paso Doble/"In the Hall of the Mountain King"	8	7	8	23	Safe
5	Viennese Waltz/"America The Beautiful"	9	8	9	26	Last to be called safe
6	Tango/"Don't Stop Believin'"	7	8	7	22	Eliminated

==== Season 13: Celebrity Partner Rob Kardashian ====
- Average: 25.1
- Placed: 2nd

Week #	Dance/Song/Musician(s)	Judges' score			Total	Result
Week #	Dance/Song/Musician(s)	Inaba	Goodman	Tonioli	Total	Result
1	Viennese Waltz/ "Lake Michigan"	6	5	5	16	Safe
2	Jive/"Surfin' Safari"	7	7	7	21	Safe
3	Foxtrot/"Fly Me to the Moon"	8	8	8	24	Safe
4	Paso Doble/"Theme from Superman"	8	8	8	24	Last to be called Safe
5	Rumba/"Hello"	9	8	8	25	Safe
6	Cha-Cha-Cha/"Walk Like a Man"	8	7	7	22	Safe
7	Tango/"Theme from The Addams Family"	9	8	8	51 (25 + 26)	Safe
7	Team Paso Doble/"Bring Me to Life"	9	8	9	51 (25 + 26)	Safe
8	Quickstep/"Take On Me"	9	9	9	51 (27 + 24)	Last to be called Safe
8	Jive/"Maneater"	8	8	8	51 (27 + 24)	Last to be called Safe
9	Samba/"I Go to Rio"	10	9	9	65 (28 + 27 + 10)	Safe
9	Argentine Tango/"Libertango"	9	9	9	65 (28 + 27 + 10)	Safe
9	Cha-Cha-Cha Relay/"I Like How It Feels"	Awarded	10	Points	65 (28 + 27 + 10)	Safe
10	Waltz/"It Is You (I Have Loved)"	9	9	9	113 (27 + 30 + 26 + 30)	Runner-Up
10	Freestyle/"Minnie the Moocher"	10	10	10	113 (27 + 30 + 26 + 30)	Runner-Up
10	Foxtrot/"Fly Me To The Moon"	9	8	9	113 (27 + 30 + 26 + 30)	Runner-Up
10	Samba/"Shake Your Bon-Bon"	10	10	10	113 (27 + 30 + 26 + 30)	Runner-Up

==== Season 14: Celebrity Partner William Levy ====
- Average: 27.5
- Placed: 3rd

Week #	Dance/Song/Musician(s)	Judges' score			Total	Result
Week #	Dance/Song/Musician(s)	Inaba	Goodman	Tonioli	Total	Result
1	Cha Cha Cha/ "International Love"	8	8	8	24	No Elimination
2	Quickstep/ "Nice Work If You Can Get It"	9	7	9	25	Safe
3	Salsa/ "La Vida es un Carnaval"	9	9	10	28	Safe
4	Jive/ "We're Not Gonna Take It"	7	7	8	22	Safe
5	Argentine Tango/ "Buttons"	10	9	10	29	Safe
6	Rumba/ "Being with You"	9	8	10	36 (27 + 9)	Safe
6	Motown Marathon / "Nowhere to Run"	Awarded	9	Points	36 (27 + 9)	Safe
7	Viennese Waltz/ "Ave Maria"	9	9	9	53 (27 + 26)	Safe
7	Team Paso Doble/ "O Fortuna"	9	8	9	53 (27 + 26)	Safe
8	Foxtrot/ "Stray Cat Strut"	10	10	10	57 (30 + 27)	Safe
8	Paso Doble (Trio Challenge)/ "Diablo Rojo"	9	9	9	57 (30 + 27)	Safe
9 Semi-finals	Tango/ "Sweet Dreams (Are Made of This)"	9	9	10	58 (28 + 30)	Safe
9 Semi-finals	Samba/ "Magalenha"	10	10	10	58 (28 + 30)	Safe
10; Finals	Cha Cha Cha/ "Raise Your Glass"	10	10	10	89 (30 + 29 + 30)	Third Place
10; Finals	Freestyle/ "Objection (Tango)"	10	9	10	89 (30 + 29 + 30)	Third Place
10; Finals	Instant Salsa / "Juventud de Presente"	10	10	10	89 (30 + 29 + 30)	Third Place

==== Season 15: Celebrity Partner Emmitt Smith ====
- Average: 26.7
- Placed: 4th

Week #	Dance/Song/Musician(s)	Judges' score			Total	Result
Week #	Dance/Song/Musician(s)	Inaba	Goodman	Tonioli	Total	Result
1	Cha Cha Cha/ "Chain of Fools"	8	8.5	8	24.5	Safe
2	Quickstep/ "A Cool Cat In Town"	7.5	7.5	7.5	22.5	Safe
3	Paso Doble/ "Canción Del Mariachi"	8.5	8	8.5	25	Safe
4	Bolero/ "Better in Time"	9	9; 9*	9	36	Safe
5	Samba/ "Copacabana"	9.5	9.5	10	56 (29 + 27)	No Elimination
5	Team Freestyle (Gilles)/ "Gangnam Style"	9	9	9	56 (29 + 27)	No Elimination
6	Foxtrot/ "Islands in the Stream"	8.5	8.5	9.5	26.5	Safe
7 Fusion Dances	Rumba & Samba/ "Fine By Me"	8.5	9.5	9.5	34.5 (27.5 + 7)	No Elimination
7 Fusion Dances	Swing Marathon/ Do Your Thing	Awarded	7	Points	34.5 (27.5 + 7)	No Elimination
8	Viennese Waltz/ "Love Letters"	9	9.5	9.5	58 (28 + 30)	Safe
8	Salsa (Trio Challenge)/ "Mr. Saxobeat"	30	30	30	58 (28 + 30)	Safe
9 Semi-Finals	Lindy Hop/ "Secret Agent Man"	9	9	9	54 (27 + 27)	Eliminated
9 Semi-Finals	Tango/ "Leave Me Alone"	9	9	9	54 (27 + 27)	Eliminated

- Score was awarded by guest judge Paula Abdul.

==== Season 16: Celebrity partner D.L. Hughley ====
- Average: 16.6
- Place: 9th

Week #	Dance/Song/Musician(s)	Judges' score			Total	Result
Week #	Dance/Song/Musician(s)	Inaba	Goodman	Tonioli	Total	Result
1	Cha Cha Cha/ "Low"	4	4	4	12	No Elimination
2	Quickstep/ "It Don't Mean a Thing"	5	5	6	16	Safe
3	Salsa / "Get Up (I Feel Like Being a) Sex Machine"	6	5	5	16 (16 + 0)	Safe
3	Group Freestyle / "The Rockafeller Skank"	Awarded	0	Points	16 (16 + 0)	Safe
4	Foxtrot / "I Just Want to Make Love to You"	7	7	7	21	Safe
5	Tango / Love Letter	6	6	6	18	Eliminated

==== Season 17: Celebrity partner Jack Osbourne ====
- Average score: 26.1
- Placed: 3rd

Week #	Dance/Song/Musician(s)	Judges' score			Total	Result
Week #	Dance/Song/Musician(s)	Inaba	Goodman	Tonioli	Total	Result
1	Foxtrot/"Pack Up"	8	8	7	23	No Elimination
2	Rumba/"Mad World"	8	8	8	24	Safe
3	Cha-cha-cha/"Hollywood Swinging"	7	7	8	22	Safe
4	Quickstep/"Man Like That"	8	8	8	24	Safe
5	Waltz/"I'm Kissing You"	9	9	9	27	Safe
6	Paso Doble/"Conquest"	8	9	8	27 (25 + 2)	No Elimination
6	Switch-Up Challenge/Various	Awarded	2	Points	27 (25 + 2)	No Elimination
7	Jive/"Going Up the Country"	10	8	9	57 (27 + 30)	Safe
7	Team Freestyle/"The Fox (What Does the Fox Say?)"	10	10	10	57 (27 + 30)	Safe
8	Tango/"The Beat Goes On"	9	9	9	30 (27 + 3)	Last to be called Safe
8	Disco Dance-Off/"Song for the Lonely"	Awarded	3	Points	30 (27 + 3)	Last to be called Safe
9	Viennese Waltz/"Let Me Go"	10	10	9	54 (29 + 25)	Safe
9	Trio Samba /"I Wan'na Be Like You"	8	8	9	54 (29 + 25)	Safe
10; Semi-finals	Jazz/"Roxanne"	8	8; 9*	8	71 (33 + 38)	Safe
10; Semi-finals	Argentine Tango/"Roxanne" (acoustic version)	10	9; 9*	10	71 (33 + 38)	Safe
11; Finals	Jive/"Going Up the Country"	8	8	8	84 (24 + 3 + 30 + 27)	Third Place
11; Finals	Samba Relay/"No Scrubs"	Awarded	3	Points	84 (24 + 3 + 30 + 27)	Third Place
11; Finals	Freestyle/"Top Hat, White Tie and Tails"	10	10	10	84 (24 + 3 + 30 + 27)	Third Place
11; Finals	Paso Doble & Salsa Fusion /"Sexy People (The Fiat Song)"	9	9	9	84 (24 + 3 + 30 + 27)	Third Place

- Score was awarded by stand in judge Maksim Chmerkovskiy.

==== Season 18: Celebrity partner Drew Carey ====
- Average: 22.0
- Place: 8th

Week #	Dance/Song	Judges' score				Total	Result
Week #	Dance/Song	Inaba	Goodman	Tonioli	Guest Judges	Total	Result
1	Foxtrot / "Money (That's What I Want)"	7	7	7	N/A	21	No Elimination
2	Jive / "You Can't Sit Down"	7	7	7	N/A	21	Safe
3	Waltz / "Fade into You"	7	7	8	8^{1}	30	Safe
4^{2}	Cha-cha-cha / "Sugarfoot"	8	8	8	9^{3}	33	No Elimination
5	Quickstep / "Friend Like Me"	7	7	7	7^{4}	28	Safe
6	Tango / "Super Freak"	8	7	8	9^{5}	32	Eliminated

With James Maslow (Switch-Up)

Week #	Dance/Song	Judges' score				Total	Result
Week #	Dance/Song	Inaba	Goodman	Tonioli	Guest Judges	Total	Result
4^{2}	Tango / "Dark Horse"	9	8	9	9^{3}	35	No Elimination

^{1}Score by guest judge Robin Roberts.

^{2}For this week only, as part of the "Partner Switch-Up" week, Drew Carey did not perform with Burke and instead performed with Witney Carson. Burke performed with James Maslow.

^{3}Score by guest judge Julianne Hough.

^{4}Score by guest judge Donny Osmond.

^{5}Score by guest judge Redfoo.

==== Season 19: Celebrity partner Antonio Sabàto Jr. ====
- Average: 28.6
- Placed: 8th

Week #	Dance/Song	Judges' score				Total	Result
Week #	Dance/Song	Inaba	Goodman	J. Hough	Tonioli	Total	Result
1	Cha-cha-cha / "Tonight (I'm Lovin' You)"	6	6	6	7	25	Safe
2	Rumba / "Adorn"	8	7	8	8	31	Safe
3	Foxtrot / "Ain't No Mountain High Enough"	7	7^{1}	7	8	29	Safe
4	Samba / "Love Will Never Do (Without You)"	7	8^{2}	7	7	29	Safe
5^{3}	Bollywood / "1,2,3,4 Get on the Dance Floor"	8	6^{4}	7	7	28	No Elimination
6	Salsa / "Bailando"	7	7^{5}	7	7	28	Safe
7	Viennese Waltz / "I Put a Spell on You"	6	7	7	7	59 (27 + 32)	Eliminated
7	Team Freestyle / "Time Warp"	8	8	8	8	59 (27 + 32)	Eliminated

With Alfonso Ribeiro (Switch-Up)

Week #	Dance/Song	Judges' score				Total	Result
Week #	Dance/Song	Inaba	Goodman	J. Hough	Tonioli	Total	Result
5^{3}	Flamenco / "Angelica"	8	9^{4}	9	8	34	No Elimination

^{1}Score given by guest judge Kevin Hart in place of Goodman.

^{2}The American public scored the dance in place of Goodman with the averaged score being counted alongside the three other judges.

^{3}This week only, for "Partner Switch-Up" week, Sabàto Jr. performed with Allison Holker instead of Burke while she performed with Alfonso Ribeiro.

^{4}Score given by guest judge Jessie J in place of Goodman.

^{5}Score given by guest judge Pitbull in place of Goodman.

==== Season 23: Celebrity partner Ryan Lochte ====
- Average: 28.9
- Placed: 7th

Week #	Dance/Song	Judges' score				Total	Result
Week #	Dance/Song	Inaba	Goodman	J. Hough	Tonioli	Total	Result
1	Foxtrot / "Call Me Irresponsible"	6	6	6	6	24	No Elimination
2	Quickstep / "The Muppet Show Theme"	6	6	6	6	24	Last to be called safe
3	Cha-cha-cha / "If It Ain't Love"	6	7	6	6	25	Safe
4	Viennese Waltz / "Jeux d'Eau"	7	—	7	8	22	Safe
5	Contemporary / "A Song for You"	8	—	8	8	24	No Elimination
6	Salsa / "La Negra Tiene Tumbao"	7	8^{1}	8	7	30	Safe
7	Rumba / "I Don't Wanna Miss a Thing"; Team Freestyle / "The Skye Boat Song"	7	7	7	7	66 (28 + 38)	Safe
7	Team Freestyle / "The Skye Boat Song"	10	9	9	10	66 (28 + 38)	Safe
8	Tango / "Howlin' for You"	7	—	8	8	26 (23 + 3)	Eliminated
8	Cha-cha-cha Dance-Off / "Can't Feel My Face"	Awarded	3	Extra	Points	26 (23 + 3)	Eliminated

^{1} Score given by guest judge Pitbull.

==== Season 25: Celebrity partner Terrell Owens ====
- Average: 22.8
- Place: 6th

Week #	Dance/Song/Musician(s)	Judges' score			Total	Result
Week #	Dance/Song/Musician(s)	Inaba	Goodman	Tonioli	Total	Result
1	Cha-cha-cha / "Ain't Too Proud to Beg"	5	5	5	15	No Elimination
2A	Foxtrot / "Pillowtalk"	7	6	7	20	Last to be called safe
2B	Samba / "Hot in Herre"	6	6	7	19	Safe
3	Salsa / "The Breaks"	7	7	7	21	No Elimination
4	Viennese Waltz / "I Have Nothing"	8	8	8	24	Safe
5	Quickstep / "I Just Can't Wait to Be King"	9	8	8	25	Safe
6	Jive / "Feel It Still"	9	9/ 10^{1}	9	37	Last to be called safe
7	Tango / "Super Freak"	8	8	9	49 (25 + 24)	Last to be called safe
7	Team Freestyle / "Monster Mash"	8	8	8	49 (25 + 24)	Last to be called safe
8	Charleston / "Bad Boy Good Man"	9	9	9	51 (27 + 24)	Eliminated
8	Trio Rumba / "Slow Hands"	8	8	8	51 (27 + 24)	Eliminated

^{1} Score given by guest judge Shania Twain.

==== Season 27: Celebrity partner Juan Pablo Di Pace ====
- Average: 27.5
- Place: 5th

Week #	Dance/Song/Musician(s)	Judges' score			Total	Result
Week #	Dance/Song/Musician(s)	Inaba	Goodman	Tonioli	Total	Result
1	Salsa / "Dinero"	7	7	8	22	Safe
2	Quickstep / "42nd Street"	9	8	9	52 (26 + 26)	Safe
2	Foxtrot / "Why Don't You Do Right?"	9	8	9	52 (26 + 26)	Safe
3	Samba / "Ni Tú Ni Yo"	10	10	10	30	Safe
4	Trio Cha-cha-cha / "Wavey"	8	8	8	24	Safe
5	Viennese Waltz / "Gaston"	10	9	10	29	No Elimination
6	Jive / "Dead Man's Party"	10	10	10	30	Safe
7	Charleston / "One Shot"	10	10	10	56 (30 + 26)	Safe
7	Team Freestyle / "Country Girl (Shake It for Me)"	9	8	9	56 (30 + 26)	Safe
8 Semi-finals	Argentine Tango / "Libertango"	10	10	10	60 (30 + 30)	Eliminated
8 Semi-finals	Salsa / "Tu Sonrisa"	10	10	10	60 (30 + 30)	Eliminated

==== Season 28: Celebrity partner Ray Lewis ====
- Average: 15.0
- Place: 11th

Week #	Dance/Song/Musician(s)	Judges' score			Total	Result
Week #	Dance/Song/Musician(s)	Inaba	Goodman	Tonioli	Total	Result
1	Salsa / "Hot in Herre"	5	5	5	15	No Elimination
2	Foxtrot / "September"	5	5	5	15	Bottom two
3	Cha-cha-cha / "Twist and Shout"	Did	Not	Perform	N/A	Withdrew

==== Season 29: Celebrity partner AJ McLean ====
- Average: 22.9
- Place: 7th

Week #	Dance/Song/Musician(s)	Judges' score			Total	Result
Week #	Dance/Song/Musician(s)	Inaba	D. Hough	Tonioli	Total	Result
1	Jive / "Blinding Lights"	6	6	6	18	No Elimination
2	Foxtrot / "Ain't That a Kick in the Head?"	7	6	6	19	Safe
3	Quickstep / "Prince Ali"	7	7	7	21	Safe
4	Cha-cha-cha / "Larger Than Life"	8	8	8	24	Safe
5	Waltz / "Open Arms"	8	8	8	24	Safe
6	Samba / "Mi Gente"	9	9	9	27	Safe
7	Tango / "Psycho"	9	8	9	26	Safe
8	Rumba / "Way Down We Go"	8	8	8	27 (24 + 3)	Safe
8	Samba Relay / "Levitating"	Awarded	3	points	27 (24 + 3)	Safe
9	Viennese waltz / "Somebody to Love"	7	8	8	25 (23 + 2)	Eliminated
9	Jive Dance-Off / "Wake Me Up Before You Go Go"	Awarded	2	points	25 (23 + 2)	Eliminated

==== Season 30: Celebrity partner Cody Rigsby ====
- Average: 32.1
- Place: 3rd

Week #	Dance/Song	Judges' score				Total	Result
Week #	Dance/Song	Inaba	Goodman	D. Hough	Tonioli	Total	Result
1	Tango / "Physical"	6	6	6	6	24	No Elimination
2	Salsa / "Don't Go Yet"	6	6	6	6	24	Safe
3	Jazz / "Gimme More"	6	—	6	6	18	Safe
4	Jive / "Stand Out"	7	6	7	7	58 (27 + 31)	Safe
4	Viennese waltz / "Gaston"	8	7	8	8	58 (27 + 31)	Safe
5	Quickstep / "We Go Together"	8	8	8	8	32	Safe
6	Cha-cha-cha / "There Will Be Blood"	9	9	9	9	36	Safe
7	Foxtrot / "You're My Best Friend"	8	8	9	9	36 (34 + 2)	Safe
7	Jive relay / "Crazy Little Thing Called Love"	Awarded	2	extra	points	36 (34 + 2)	Safe
8	Paso Doble / "Black Cat"	10	10	9	9	38 (38 + 0)	Safe
8	Cha-cha-cha Dance-off - "Together Again"	No	Extra	Points	Awarded	38 (38 + 0)	Safe
9 Semi-finals	Salsa / "Danza Kuduro"	9	9	8	9	71 (35 + 36)	Safe
9 Semi-finals	Argentine Tango / "La cumparsita"	9	9	9	9	71 (35 + 36)	Safe
10; Finals	Paso Doble and Cha Cha / "Beethoven's Fifth"	9	9	9; 10^{1}	9	76 (36 + 40)	Third Place
10; Finals	Freestyle / "Nails, Hair, Hips, Heels"	10	10	10; 10^{1}	10	76 (36 + 40)	Third Place

^{1} Score given by standing judge Julianne Hough.

==== Season 31: Celebrity partner Sam Champion ====
- Average: 24.0
- Place: 13th

Week #	Dance/Song	Judges' score				Total	Result
Week #	Dance/Song	Inaba	Goodman	D. Hough	Tonioli	Total	Result
1	Foxtrot / "Hold Me Closer"	5	5	5	5	20	Safe
2	Viennese waltz / "Heartbreak Hotel"	6	6	7	7	26	Safe
3	Samba / "Los Muertos Vivos Están"	6	6	6	7	25	Bottom two
4	Paso Doble / "The Greatest Show"	7	6	6	6	25	Eliminated

== Other television appearances ==
Burke had a guest role on the Disney Channel series The Suite Life of Zack & Cody, in the episode "Loosely Ballroom" along with fellow DWTS professionals Louis van Amstel, Ashly DelGrosso, and Lacey Schwimmer. She portrayed Shannon, a nurse attending to the ensemble cast during a dance contest at the series setting, The Tipton Hotel. In the final round of the competition, Burke's character volunteers to replace an ill competitor (Carey). She and her partner, Esteban, go on to win the competition.

She finished in second place on the first season of I Can Do That, losing to Nicole Scherzinger on the final three-person-super-group performance, having led the competition since week 2. She replaced Abby Lee Miller on Dance Moms in 2017. She took over the ALDC Elite competition team while on the show. The team was then named "The Irreplaceable's", in which Miller would call them "replaceable".

Burke appeared on Hell's Kitchen as a VIP guest diner in the ninth episode of Season 17.

In January 2025, Burke appeared on season 28 of Worst Cooks in America, a celebrity edition in which she competed on Jeff Mauro's "Heroes" team. She was the first contestant eliminated, in the second episode; she received $2,500 for the mental health charity Better You. Most recently, she had signed a deal with ABC.

== Awards and honors ==
- 2005 World Cup Professional Rising Star Latin Champion
- 2005 San Francisco Latin Champion
- 2005 Ohio Star Ball Rising Star Latin Champion
- UK Championships
- 4th in the U.S. in the "Under 21s."
- Two-time Dancing with the Stars champion – Season 2 with Drew Lachey, Season 3 with Emmitt Smith
- Primetime Emmy 2006, Outstanding Choreography
- On October 20, 2007, Cheryl won the Role Model Award at the 7th Annual Filipino/American Library Gala.
- On the 2008 Asian Excellence Awards, she won the Viewer's Choice award for Favorite TV Personality.

== Personal life ==
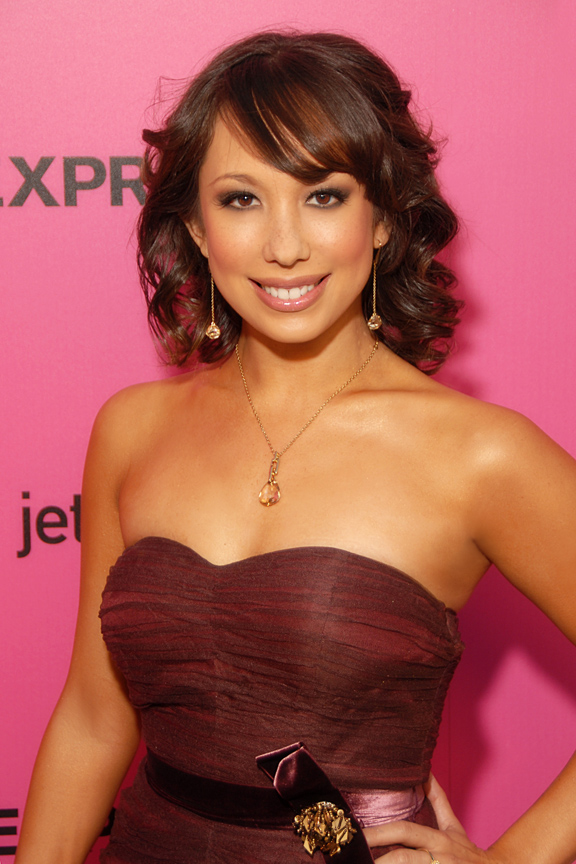
Burke in 2009

Burke has done numerous promotions outside of Dancing with the Stars which include Depend Silhouette briefs, Impress Nails and Sargento Cheese. Her partnership with these companies has raised a lot of money including $50,000 that Depend donated to Dress for Success. She opened her first dance studio in April 2008 and created her own line of activewear the following year.

In 2011, Burke released her autobiography, Dancing Lessons. The book addresses topics Cheryl experienced in her youth, such as childhood abuse and body shaming. She describes how at age 5 she was molested by a handyman who worked for her family; he repeatedly fondled her. Her sister was also abused by the same man, later identified as Gerry Depaula. At the time she believed it was wrong behavior but wanted to gain his affection. Burke testified against Depaula at age 6, leading to him being sentenced to 24 years in prison. He was released in 2008.

In 2017, People and Us Weekly reported Burke was dating actor Matthew Lawrence. The two first met in 2006, when Lawrence's brother, Joey, was a contestant on DWTS. Burke and Lawrence previously dated from 2007 to 2008. Lawrence proposed to Burke on May 3, 2018, which was her 34th birthday. On May 23, 2019, she married Lawrence in San Diego, California. On February 23, 2022, it was reported that Burke filed for divorce. The divorce was finalized on September 19, 2022.

Burke suffers from tendinitis. She says that Transcendental Meditation and therapy have helped her through a lot, including her recent divorce from Matthew Lawrence.
