= The Talk (talk show) =

American talk show (2010–2024)

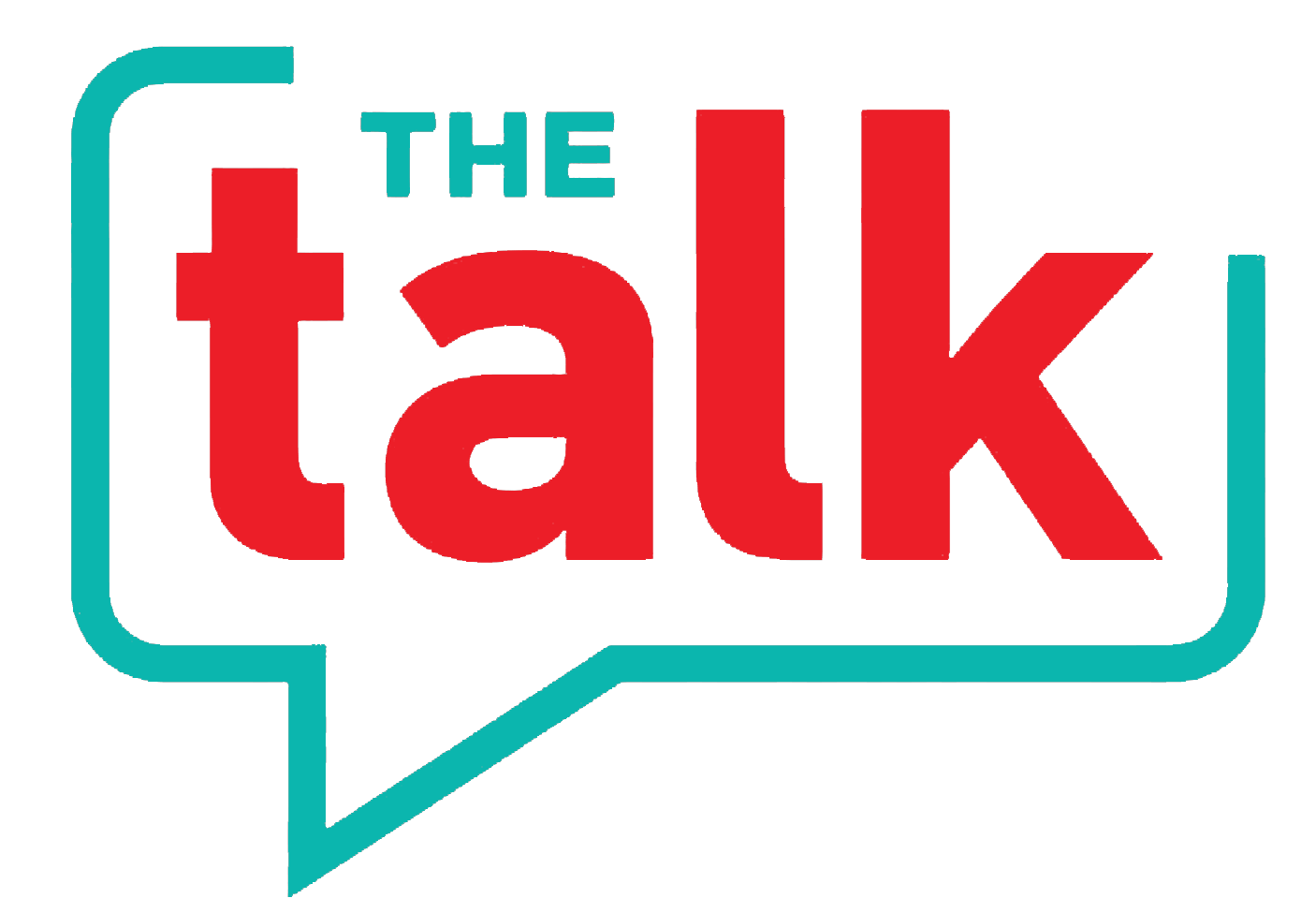
- Genre: Talk show
- Created by: Sara Gilbert
- Presented by: Julie Chen; Sara Gilbert; Sharon Osbourne; Marissa Jaret Winokur; Leah Remini; Holly Robinson Peete; Aisha Tyler; Sheryl Underwood; Eve; Carrie Ann Inaba; Marie Osmond; Amanda Kloots; Elaine Welteroth; Jerry O'Connell; Akbar Gbajabiamila; Natalie Morales
- Theme music composer: Gregg Wattenberg; Andy Grammer
- Country of origin: United States
- Original language: English
- No. of seasons: 15
- No. of episodes: 2,993

Production
- Executive producers: Sara Gilbert (2010–19); Brad Bessey (2010–2011); Susan Winston (2011); John Redmann (2010–2020); Heather Gray (2020–2022); Kristin Matthews (2020–2023); Rob Crabbe (2023–2024)
- Producer: Carrie Ann Inaba (2019–2021)
- Production locations: Radford Studio Center; Los Angeles, California
- Camera setup: Multi-camera
- Running time: 42 minutes
- Production company: CBS Studios (Note: Credited as CBS Television Studios until 2020)

Original release
- Network: CBS
- Release: October 18, 2010 – December 20, 2024

The Talk is an American talk show that aired on CBS from October 18, 2010, to December 20, 2024. The show was developed by actress and host Sara Gilbert, who served as a co-host for the first nine seasons.

The show's final panel of hosts consisted of Sheryl Underwood, Amanda Kloots, Jerry O'Connell, Akbar Gbajabiamila, and Natalie Morales (who served as moderator). They discussed the latest headlines, current events, and human-interest stories while engaging in open conversation. The original concept theme focused on motherhood, and over time evolved into a broader platform.

The Talk was broadcast before a live studio audience at the CBS Studio Center in Studio City, California, each Monday through Friday at 11:00 a.m. Pacific Time Zone, and aired live on most CBS owned-and-operated station and network affiliates in the Eastern and Central United States at 2:00 p.m. Eastern Time Zone. The show was on a broadcast delay elsewhere from the Mountain Time Zone westward. The Friday shows were recorded on Thursday afternoons at 1:00 pm PT for broadcast the next day. Friday shows were taped before the same studio audience in attendance for the earlier live Thursday broadcast.

After years of declining ratings, on April 12, 2024, CBS announced that The Talk's 15th season would be its last season. Three days later, a new soap titled Beyond the Gates was greenlit by CBS. The final episode aired on December 20, 2024. 2,993 episodes were produced.

== Format ==
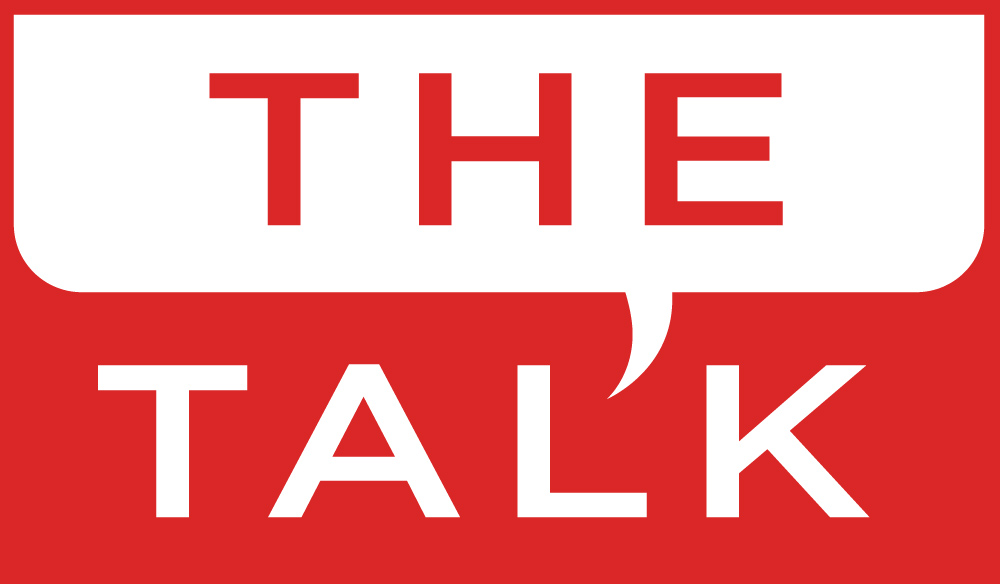
The Talk logo (2010–2020)

The Talk has a format similar in style to ABC's The View. The opening segment of the broadcast is known as "Everybody Talks" and usually runs a combined 12 to 25 minutes. The panel discusses current news items, typically focusing on tabloid headlines, offbeat stories, and celebrity news. The program also actively incorporates social media to allow viewers to provide their opinions on the stories discussed through Twitter (using the hashtag #EverybodyTalks, or alternately the abbreviated #EVBT). In season five, the program began allowing viewers to use Instagram to record and upload videos using the aforementioned hashtags, with one or two videos being selected to air on the live broadcasts.

On most editions, the "Top Talker" joins the panel on the final segment of the topical discussion, featuring a rotating set of contributors – most of whom are correspondents/hosts of entertainment-related newsmagazine programs or magazines or hosts of local or syndicated radio programs – providing detailed analysis of a single trending, usually celebrity-related, story. Following the "Everybody Talks" segment, the panel interviews one or two featured celebrity guests; most of these interviews are conducted at the set's roundtable. Musical performances are also occasionally included.

The show also regularly has a cooking segment two to four times each week, with two of the panelists assisting in the preparation of the featured recipes with the guest chef. Product giveaways are also done once per week, as part of an advertorial segment showcasing fashion/beauty products and electronics that are given away to studio audience members for attending the show, and are often tied into online deal of the day where the viewing audience can purchase the products offered at a reduced price.

For the first nine seasons, each episode signed off with one of the co-hosts, primarily the moderator, saying "Remember, it's always the right time to have The Talk!". With the start of season 10, the sign-off was changed to "Let’s talk tomorrow,” (on Fridays or into hiatuses) "Let’s talk soon,” or "Tune in to see what we're talking about right here on The Talk."

== Development ==
In December 2009, CBS announced the cancellation of As the World Turns after 54 years, and was looking for a program to replace the long-running soap opera in its time slot. Sara Gilbert approached CBS about producing a pilot that would feature six women talking about the day's headlines with opinions told through "the eyes of mothers."

On July 21, 2010, CBS announced that it had picked up the show (by then, given the title The Talk), beating out several other contenders, including a cooking show featuring Emeril Lagasse; Say It Now, a talk show featuring Valerie Bertinelli and Rove McManus; and a revamped version of the classic game show Pyramid, hosted by Andy Richter.

In the four weeks prior to the show's debut, new episodes of The Price Is Right and Let's Make a Deal, as well as repeats of The Young and the Restless, aired in the timeslot vacated by As the World Turns.

== Co-hosts ==
=== Timeline ===
Co-hosts timeline of The Talk
Co-host	Years	Seasons														
Co-host	Years	1	2	3	4	5	6	7	8	9	10	11	12	13	14	15
Julie Chen	2010–2018															
Sara Gilbert	2010–2019															
Sharon Osbourne	2010–2021															
Leah Remini	2010–2011															
Holly Robinson Peete	2010–2011															
Marissa Jaret Winokur	2010															
Aisha Tyler	2011–2017															
Sheryl Underwood	2011–2024															
Eve	2017–2020															
Carrie Ann Inaba	2019–2021															
Marie Osmond	2019–2020															
Elaine Welteroth	2021															
Amanda Kloots	2021–2024															
Jerry O'Connell	2021–2024															
Akbar Gbajabiamila	2021–2024															
Natalie Morales	2021–2024															

=== Season 1 ===
The original panel consisted of Sara Gilbert, known for her role on the TV series Roseanne; Holly Robinson Peete, known for her roles on the TV series 21 Jump Street and Hangin' with Mr. Cooper; Leah Remini, known for her role as Carrie Heffernan in the 1998–2007 CBS sitcom The King of Queens; Big Brother host Julie Chen; and former talk show hostess/The X Factor judge Sharon Osbourne, the wife of the British rocker Ozzy Osbourne. Marissa Jaret Winokur was featured in an out-of-the studio position as the "mother on the street," dealing with issues like taking her toddler on an airplane, talking with kids about sex, talking to parents about the "child development stages" and other parental issues.

On January 14, 2011, Winokur reported that she would not be returning to the show in 2011. In an exclusive statement to People, original executive producer Brad Bessey said of Winokur's departure, "We think the world of Marissa as a creative talent, on-air personality and super mom. This is a mutual decision based on time, not talent."

When America's Got Talent resumed filming on March 2, 2011, Osbourne's daughter Kelly Osbourne began filling in for her on a substitute basis, as the show's first substitute host.

On August 26, 2011, it was announced that original co-host Remini had been released from the show. On September 2, 2011, it was confirmed that Peete had also been released from the show. Osbourne eventually gave opinion on their dismissals in December 2011 on The Howard Stern Show, stating: "Some people don't really know who they are, and you have to know who you are when you're in something like this. You can't pretend to be something you're not. You have to know your brand. You can't be all things to everyone."

=== Seasons 2–6 ===
On August 26, 2011, CBS announced that comedian Sheryl Underwood would join the panel as a co-host at the start of its second season, replacing Remini; Underwood was officially added to the program on September 6, 2011, beginning with that season's premiere episode.

Molly Shannon served as the (guest) co-host during the month of September 2011. Actress and comedian Aisha Tyler's addition to the panel was announced on October 23, 2011, replacing Peete.

On October 12, 2016, The Talk featured special tributes to CBS' current soap operas The Young and the Restless and The Bold and the Beautiful and past serials As the World Turns and Guiding Light as part of the network's celebration of its then-30-year streak as the top-rated American broadcast network in daytime.

=== Seasons 7–10 ===
On June 15, 2017, Tyler announced she would leave the series following the completion of the series' seventh season. She said she would return as a guest host and to promote her various projects. Her last show aired on August 4, 2017. The current hosts of The Talk auditioned women on air as "dates" to fill in Tyler's seat. At the start of the eighth season, the guest hosts included Wayne Brady, Shemar Moore, Eric Christian Olsen, Wilmer Valderrama, Chris O'Donnell, Garcelle Beauvais, Tyler, Sabrina Soto, Vanessa Lachey, Vanessa Marcil, Pat Harvey, Roselyn Sanchez, Carrie Ann Inaba, Michelle Williams, Eve, Carnie Wilson, Jack Osbourne, Paula Abdul, Grant Show, and Sasheer Zamata. Hip-hop rapper Eve was announced as the fifth permanent co-host on November 14, 2017.

In a promo for the ninth season, it was revealed that all five co-hosts would return to the panel. However, Chen did not return to the show for the ninth-season premiere amid sexual misconduct allegations against her husband Les Moonves. Chen officially announced her departure from the talk show in a pre-taped message on Tuesday, September 18, 2018. Guest hosts included Jodie Sweetin, Inaba, Wilson, Valerie Bertinelli, Tyler, Anjelica Huston, Jack Osbourne, Sheila E, Leeza Gibbons, Sanchez, Lisa Ling, Constance Marie, Ricki Lake, Camila Alves, Katherine Schwarzenegger, Brenda Song, Meredith Vieira, Salt-N-Pepa, Soledad O'Brien, Arsenio Hall, Catt Sadler, Robin Thede, Rita Moreno, Sara Evans, Lachey, Robin McGraw, Paris Hilton, Ayesha Curry, and Sean Hayes. On December 6, 2018, Variety announced that Inaba had been chosen to join the show as a permanent co-host and moderator, with a projected January 2019 debut. Inaba officially joined the show on January 2, 2019.

During the April 9, 2019 episode, Gilbert announced she would depart the talk show at the conclusion of its ninth season; she cited acting opportunities and her desire to produce other projects as the reason for her departure; her final episode aired on August 2, 2019.

The tenth season premiered on September 9, 2019, with Marie Osmond replacing Gilbert as co-host. In addition to Osmond's addition, a new set was unveiled. In March 2020, the show was scheduled to broadcast without an audience due to the COVID-19 pandemic in the United States, but CBS later decided to stop the show altogether out of an abundance of caution. The show was quickly revamped as The Talk @Home and began broadcast using Zoom, featuring each host from their own homes. Osmond departed the show in September 2020, before the 11th-season premiere.

=== Season 11 ===
Season 11 of the show premiered on September 21, 2020, with the hosts returning to a new set redesigned to promote social distancing between the hosts due to the continuing global pandemic by removing the table that the hosts previously sat behind the previous seasons. Inaba, Osbourne and Underwood had a chair on the stage while Eve used a monitor screen to broadcast from London due to the travel restrictions between the US and the UK. Originally, Osbourne was scheduled to return to be in the studio on the day of the premiere but (due to a diagnosis that revealed that the daughter of her son Jack had tested positive for COVID-19 just before the premiere), Osbourne had to be placed in quarantine, and thus would be appearing for the first two weeks of the season via Zoom call with a similar screen to the one Eve used. Additionally, when Osbourne was cleared to return to the studio and be on set, Inaba had to broadcast via Zoom call for a day due to feeling under the weather and because her autoimmune disorder increases the risk of her contracting COVID-19. On December 11, Inaba would inform her fans via social media that she had tested positive for the virus which caused her to be unable to be part of the final episodes of the year before the holiday hiatus (which included Eve's farewell episode) and on December 15 Osbourne revealed that she too had tested positive for the virus as well but was quarantining away from her husband Ozzy.

On November 2, 2020, Eve announced she would leave the show in December 2020, due to COVID-19 travel restrictions, an impending lockdown in London, and her desire to expand her family. On December 1 of the same year, it was announced Amanda Kloots and Elaine Welteroth were chosen to join the panel; they made their first appearances as co-hosts on January 4, 2021, as all five were hosting from their respective homes as a precautionary measure due to a high spike in COVID infections in the LA area. After a week of remote episodes, they returned to the studio on January 11.

On April 26, 2021, Inaba announced she would take a leave of absence from the show.

==== Sharon Osbourne termination ====
On March 10, 2021, Osbourne and Underwood got into a heated debate when discussing critical remarks that British journalist Piers Morgan had made the day before on Good Morning Britain about Meghan Markle. (The backlash to those remarks caused him to quit the program later that day). Osbourne, who is friends with Morgan, defended his right to express his opinion, adding that she didn't agree with charging him as "racist" for his opinion. Underwood countered that Morgan's remarks were racist, and that Osbourne was thus giving "validation or safe haven" to racism; Osbourne forcefully denied this charge. The show took a hiatus for the next few days while the network investigated the altercation.

During that time, former The Talk co-hosts Remini and Peete both took to social media to reproach Osbourne over her behaviors against Underwood, also stating that they along with other cast members of the show had been treated similarly by Osbourne. Peete and Remini additionally charged Osbourne with other forms of misconduct, including bullying and discrimination. Osbourne responded with threats of defamation lawsuits against both women, though ultimately she did not sue.

On March 26, 2021, it was announced that Osbourne had been fired from the show after allegations of racism.

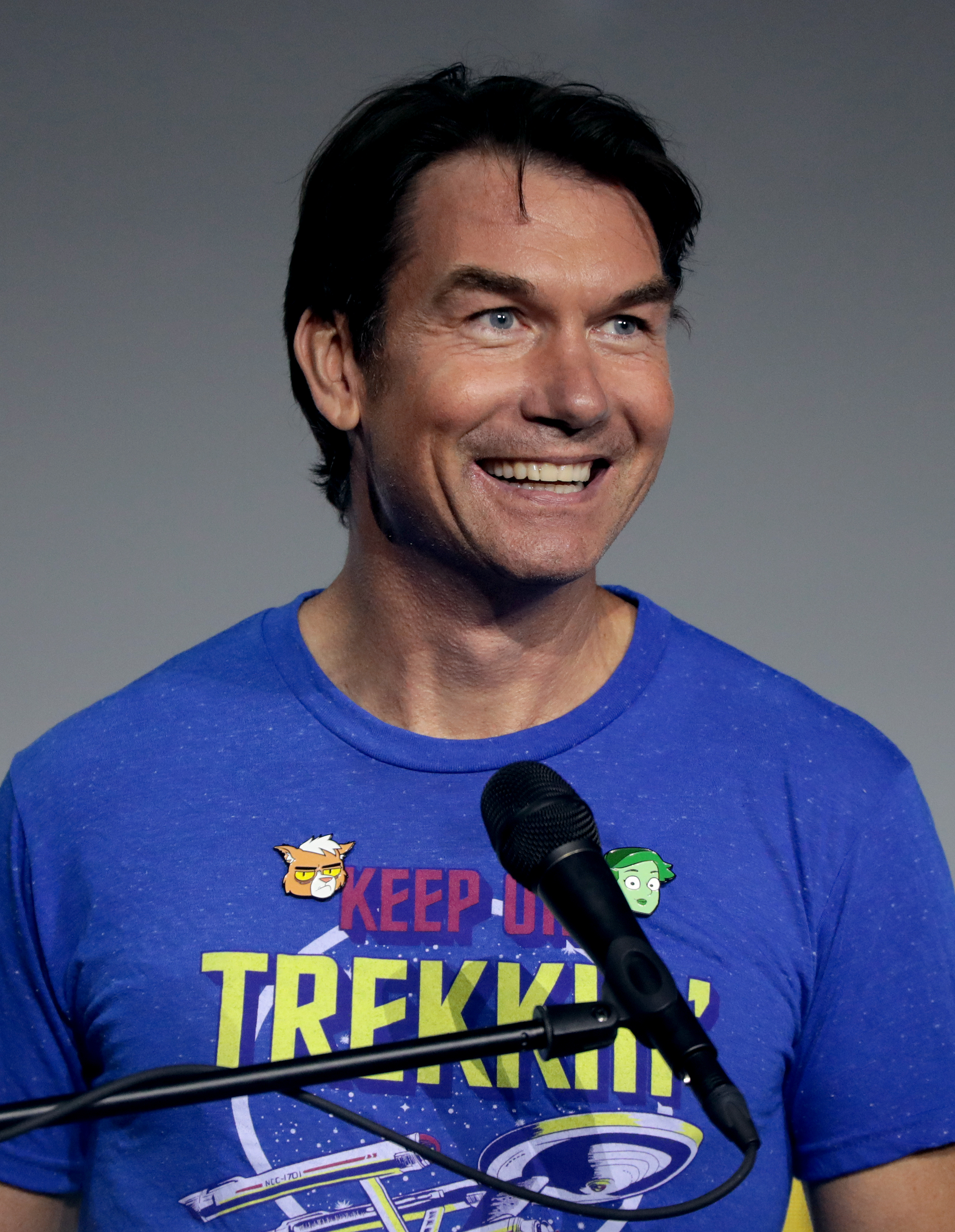
Jerry O'Connell was brought in as a replacement following Sharon Osbourne's firing.

On July 14, 2021, it was announced that Jerry O'Connell would be joining the show as a permanent co-host, replacing Osbourne. O'Connell became the first full-time male co-host on the show.

=== Seasons 12–15 ===
On August 20, 2021, it was confirmed that Inaba would not be returning to the show for the upcoming season. Shortly after, it was confirmed that Welteroth would also not be returning to the show.

On September 2, 2021, it was announced that Akbar Gbajabiamila would join the show as a co-host, replacing Welteroth, and the second full-time male co-host on the show.

On October 4, 2021, it was confirmed that Natalie Morales would join the show as a permanent co-host and moderator, replacing Inaba. Morales joined the show on October 11, 2021.

On April 18, 2022, CBS renewed The Talk for a thirteenth season with Underwood, Kloots, O'Connell, Gbajabiamila and Morales all set to return.

On May 2, 2023, it was announced that the show would go on hiatus due to the Writers Guild of America strike. On September 11, the show was reported to be planning to resume filming, with it being confirmed two days later with a rehearsal filmed that same day. On September 17, production for the show was suspended and the premier on September 18 was postponed. The show fully resumed production upon completion of the strike on September 27, with the fourteenth season premiered on October 9, 2023.

On April 12, 2024, CBS announced that The Talk's 15th season would be its final season, and its final episode aired on December 20, 2024. On April 15, 2024, a new soap titled Beyond the Gates was greenlit by CBS.

== Notable episodes ==
=== Season premieres ===
The first week of shows featured several celebrity guests, including model Christie Brinkley, singer/actress Jennifer Lopez, actress/director Chandra Wilson, actress/author Jamie Lee Curtis, and former South Carolina first lady Jenny Sanford.

The third-season premiere (aired on September 10, 2012) featured all five co-hosts, as well as members of the studio audience, without their make-up and dressed in robes during the broadcast; all of the co-hosts were also shown beside pictures of themselves with make-up. The guests for that edition, who also participated in the stunt, were Jamie Lee Curtis; Michelle Stafford and Melody Thomas Scott of The Young and the Restless; and Katherine Kelly Lang of The Bold and the Beautiful.

The premiere weeks of the fourth and fifth seasons (September 9 to 13, 2013 and September 8 to 12, 2014) featured "The Talk Tells All", a daily feature on the season's first week of shows in which the co-hosts revealed never-before-disclosed personal secrets on-air.

Season six premiered on September 14, 2015, with a slightly new set design featuring three new large monitors with backdrops including palm trees and the Los Angeles skyline. Season seven premiered on September 12, 2016, with the same set. The hosts kicked off premiere week by unveiling answers to the viewers' biggest questions with a theme they called "The 7 Wonders of The Talk."

=== On-location editions ===
The show made two trips to New York City during its second season, broadcasting live for one week on each trip. The Talk has done week-long broadcasts from New York City twice per season since then (usually during the February and May Nielsen ratings periods and in December), with the Thursday and Friday episodes being recorded on the same day as the Tuesday and Wednesday live broadcasts. The program's first set of New York City episodes in the third season (from December 10 to 14, 2012), featured a partnership with Toys for Tots, asking all guests and audience members to bring a new unwrapped toy to donate to the charity.

During the third season, The Talk broadcast a week of episodes from New Orleans, Louisiana – site of Super Bowl XLVII - from January 28, 2013, to February 1, 2013, to help promote CBS's coverage of the National Football League championship game.

=== The Talk After Dark ===
From January 12–16, 2015, The Talk aired a week of special late-night episodes, billed as The Talk After Dark. Recorded each afternoon that week before the studio audience in attendance for the earlier live daytime broadcasts, the episodes featured a separate lineup of guests and topics from the daytime editions. They also included a house band led by musician Linda Perry, wife of series creator and co-host Gilbert. The episodes were broadcast in the 12:37 a.m ET timeslot normally occupied by The Late Late Show, as part of the transitional period between Craig Ferguson's departure from the program in December 2014, and the premiere of The Late Late Show with James Corden (which was otherwise filled by a cycle of guest hosts).

=== The Talk: Keep Talking ===
From March 15 to 16, 2018, The Talk aired two exclusive episodes on their Facebook page entitled Keep Talking as CBS broadcast the NCAA Division I men's basketball tournament games on the aforementioned dates. This special edition featured all five co-hosts communicating with their Facebook fans asking them personal questions and advice for their own personal problems. Unlike a normal episode the topics were decided entirely by the fans. Both episodes were around four minutes.

=== The Talk: @Home ===
Inaba announced on the March 12, 2020 episode that due to the COVID-19 pandemic, The Talk would broadcast without an audience. Afterwards CBS halted the in-studio production of The Talk. Once CBS forced the production to shut down, Inaba began hosting a daily Instagram live from her own home during the stay-at-home order. CBS greenlit Inaba's show while including all five co-hosts under a new format titled The Talk: Chat Room which aired via Instagram Live. On March 30, 2020, the show began using Zoom, allowing the show's hosts (and guests) to broadcast from their homes. The format of the show remained the same starting with discussions from trending current events, host discussions, and having guests join who were also using the same video platform. The show continued to use the @Home format until September 14, 2020, when the show returned to the newly reconfigured studio for the Season 11 premiere.

- All of The Talk hosts (including Chen, Gilbert, and Tyler) made a cameo appearance on the Supergirl episode "Falling" (a show which started on CBS that season then moved to The CW the next), which aired on March 14, 2016. In the episode, Cat Grant (played by Calista Flockhart) makes a guest appearance on the Arrowverse's iteration of The Talk.
- All of the then-hosts, again playing themselves, appeared on the episode "Chapter Seventy-Four" of Jane the Virgin (directed by Gina Rodriguez), which aired on February 9, 2018.

== Reception ==
=== Ratings ===
The debut episode of The Talk was number one in its timeslot in 20 of the 56 markets. As of October 2011, The Talk averaged 1.83 million viewers per episode, a 25% decrease from As the World Turns' ratings the previous year.

By June 2012, The Talk averaged 1.7/6 in households, 2.29 million viewers, 1.1/7 in women 25–54 and 0.8/5 in women 18–49. The women 25–54 rating was The Talk's highest since the week ending February 17, while the women 18–49 rating was the best since the week ending May 4. Compared to the same week last year, The Talk was up +21% in households (from 1.4/4), +24% in viewers (from. 1.85m), +38% in women 25–54 (from 0.8/5) and +33% in women 18–49 (from 0.6/4).

=== Criticism ===
In reference to a news story about Catherine Kieu, a woman who cut off her husband's penis and put it in the garbage disposal because he asked for a divorce, Sharon Osbourne said, "However, I do think it is quite fabulous", prompting laughter from the other panelists. When Sara Gilbert argued that "if somebody cut a woman's breast off, nobody would be sitting laughing", Osbourne replied: "It's different." CBS received a number of complaints, and during a subsequent show, Osbourne said "she was sorry she offended people" and that she "did not condone genital mutilation".

The failure to disclose on-air why co-hosts Remini and Robinson Peete were released, or even to mention them, prompted criticism from some viewers, with some fans of the two stars protesting their dismissals.

Just weeks before the start of the 11th season it was announced that Osmond would leave the show, stating her desire to pursue new projects.

In a taped episode on March 10, 2021, a heated discussion between Osbourne and Underwood concerning Piers Morgan’s comments about Meghan, Duchess of Sussex following the broadcast of Oprah with Meghan and Harry received significant criticism from viewers. Osbourne apologized on Twitter. The interaction on the program led to an internal review conducted by CBS with the show not being broadcast on March 15 and 16. Sometime later in the day on March 16, it was announced that the show would be going into an extended hiatus, following news reports of former co-host Remini accusing Osbourne of saying racist and homophobic slurs about fellow former co-hosts Robinson Peete, Chen, and Gilbert. Later that month on March 26, it was announced that Osbourne had been officially terminated from her position on the series and that the show would return after an extended hiatus on April 12. Osbourne was the last of the six original hosts from the premiere to no longer be a part of the show moving forward.

=== Awards and nominations ===
Year	Association	Category	Recipients	Result
2012	Daytime Emmy Awards	Daytime Emmy Award for Outstanding Talk Show Entertainment		Nominated
2013	Daytime Emmy Awards	Daytime Emmy Award for Outstanding Talk Show Entertainment		Nominated
2014	Daytime Emmy Awards	Daytime Emmy Award for Outstanding Talk Show Entertainment		Nominated
2014	Daytime Emmy Awards	Daytime Emmy Award for Outstanding Entertainment Talk Show Host	Chen, Gilbert, Osbourne, Tyler, Underwood	Nominated
2015	Daytime Emmy Awards	Outstanding Talk Show/Entertainment		Nominated
2015	Daytime Emmy Awards	Outstanding Entertainment Talk Show Host	Chen, Gilbert, Osbourne, Tyler, Underwood	Nominated
2016	Daytime Emmy Awards	Outstanding Talk Show/Entertainment		Won
2016	Daytime Emmy Awards	Outstanding Entertainment Talk Show Host	Chen, Gilbert, Osbourne, Tyler, Underwood	Nominated
2016	People's Choice Awards	Favorite Daytime TV Hosting Team	Chen, Gilbert, Osbourne, Tyler, Underwood	Won
2017	Daytime Emmy Awards	Outstanding Talk Show/Entertainment		Nominated
2017	Daytime Emmy Awards	Outstanding Entertainment Talk Show Host	Chen, Gilbert, Osbourne, Tyler, Underwood	Won
2018	Daytime Emmy Awards	Outstanding Talk Show/Entertainment		Won
2018	Daytime Emmy Awards	Outstanding Entertainment Talk Show Host	Chen, Gilbert, Osbourne, Tyler, Underwood	Nominated
2019	Daytime Emmy Awards	Outstanding Talk Show/Entertainment		Nominated
2019	Daytime Emmy Awards	Outstanding Entertainment Talk Show Host	Chen, Eve, Gilbert, Carrie Ann Inaba, Osbourne, Underwood	Nominated
2020	Daytime Emmy Awards	Outstanding Talk Show/Entertainment		Nominated
2020	Daytime Emmy Awards	Outstanding Entertainment Talk Show Host	Eve, Gilbert, Inaba, Osbourne, Marie Osmond, Underwood	Nominated
2023	Daytime Emmy Awards	Outstanding Technical Team, Camera Work, Video		Nominated
2023	Daytime Emmy Awards	Outstanding Art Direction/Set Decorating/Scenic Design		Nominated
2024	Daytime Emmy Awards	Outstanding Entertainment Talk Show Host	Gbajabiamila, Kloots, Morales, O'Connell, Underwood,	Nominated
2024	Daytime Emmy Awards	Outstanding Live Sound Mixing and Sound Editing		Nominated

== International broadcasts ==
- In Australia, The Talk began broadcasting on August 6, 2012, on Network 10, as a replacement for controversially axed local talk show The Circle. The Talk rates lower than the former local offering, achieving just 29,000 viewers on August 15 compared to the axed show's 39,000 two months earlier, and well below rival programs Seven Network's The Morning Show and Nine Network's Today Extra which rated 200,000 and 119,000 viewers respectively. In 2017, CBS Corporation purchased Ten Network Holdings, the parent company of Network Ten. Currently it airs against the main breakfast programmes on Seven and Nine, as a lead-out from CBS Mornings.
- In Canada, The Talk airs simultaneously on the Global Television Network and on CJON-DT in Newfoundland and Labrador.
- In the United Kingdom, The Talk began being broadcasting on July 4, 2011, on Diva TV.
- In South Africa, The Talk began broadcasting on April 1, 2011, in the 1 pm timeslot on M-Net.
- In the Philippines, the program was formerly aired on Solar News Channel, but they discontinued airing in September 2013 after season 4 is aired. Season 5 is aired of March 2015 on CT.
- In the Czech Republic, The Talk airs on Prima Love.
- In New Zealand, The Talk began broadcasting on January 23, 2012, on TV3.
- In the Arab world, The Talk airs on MBC 4.

== See also ==
- The View
- Loose Women
- The Other Half
- The Real
- The Social
