= BHB (album) =

Studio album by Ballas Hough Band
- Released: March 10, 2009
- Genre: Pop rock
- Length: 38:59
- Label: Hollywood

BHB is the debut and only album from pop music group Ballas Hough Band formed by Dancing with the Stars professional dancers Derek Hough and Mark Ballas. The album was released on March 10, 2009, via Hollywood Records.

On the chart week of March 28, 2009, the album made its chart debut at #98 on the U.S. Billboard 200. The album's first single, "Do It for You", failed to chart, as well as the second single "Do You Love Me".

== Critical reception ==
Professional ratings
Review scores
Source	Rating
Allmusic —	3/5 stars

Allmusic reviewer Matt Collar resulted that "the resulting sound is definitely more rock-informed than one might expect and should draw favorable comparisons to such similarly inclined outfits as Maroon 5 and the Jonas Brothers. Collar also listed "Do You Love Me", "Fall", and "Do It for You" as the album's stand-out tracks.

== Track listing ==
1. "Do You Love Me" (Kevin Kadish, John O'Brien) — 2:45
2. "Devastated" (Martin Briley, Dana Calitri, Nina Ossoff) — 3:12
3. "Closer" (Mark Ballas, Derek Hough, John Fields, Dan Wilson) — 3:04
4. "She Was the One" (Ryan Lindsey, Wilson) — 4:00
5. "Longing For" (Ballas) — 4:29
6. "Birthday" (Ballas) — 3:39
7. "Fall" (Ballas, Hough, Emily Grace, Sam Marder, Joanna Pacitti, Harry Sullivan) — 3:26
8. "Do It for You" (Kara DioGuardi, Marty James, Ari Levine) — 3:27
9. "Break Through" (Ballas, Hough, Andy Dodd, Adam Watts) — 3:05
10. "Together Faraway" (Ballas) — 3:46
11. "Underwater" (Ballas) — 4:11
12. "Turnin' Me On (Bonus Track)" (Dan Wilson) - 3:00

== Personnel ==
- Jim Anton – bass
- Mark Ballas – guitar, vocals
- Tommy Barbarella – organ, synthesizer, effects
- Ken Chastain – percussion, keyboards, programming
- Bradley Cook – engineer
- Andy Dodd – guitar, keyboards, programming, producer, mixing
- John Fields – bass, guitar, keyboards, programming, producer, engineer, mixing, synthesizer bass
- Serban Ghenea – mixing
- Emily Grace – keyboards, vocals
- Paul David Hager – mixing
- David Ryan Harris – guitar
- Derek Hough – guitar, vocals
- Marty James – vocals
- Ari Levine – keyboards, programming, producer
- Stephen Lu – strings
- Sam Marder – bass
- Dave McNair – mastering
- Aaron Patzner – violin
- Lewis Patzner – cello
- Marc Pfafflin – beats
- Tim Pierce – guitar
- Nic Rodriguez – production assistant, pro-tools
- Jamie Seyberth – mixing assistant
- David Snow – creative director
- Harry Sullivan – drums
- Gavin Taylor – art direction, design
- Adam Watts – keyboards, programming, producer, mixing
- Geoffrey Weiss – A&R
- Lincoln Wheeler – marketing
- Dan Wilson – piano

== Chart performance ==
Chart (2009)	Peak position
U.S. Billboard 200	98
