= Ballas Hough Band =

American pop rock band

- Also known as: Almost Amy
- Origin: London, England
- Genres: Pop rock
- Years active: 2005–2010
- Labels: Hollywood Records (2008–2010); Morey Management (2010)
- Members: Mark Ballas; Derek Hough; Emily Grace; Sam Marder; Harry Sullivan

The Ballas Hough Band was an American pop rock fronted by Mark Ballas and Derek Hough, both of whom played lead guitar and sang lead vocals. The band's other members were Sam Marder (bass guitar), Harry Sullivan (drums) and Emily Grace (keyboards, background vocals). The name for the band is a combination of the two lead singers' last names.

They released their self-titled, debut album, BHB, on March 10, 2009, via Hollywood Records. The album debuted and peaked at No. 98 on the U.S. Billboard 200. On November 3, 2009, the group performed for the first time on Dancing with the Stars. They performed their single, "Move", the lead-off single to their planned untitled second studio album.

The band left Hollywood Records in 2010 and, according to a post on their then active MySpace page, switched to Morey Management. While they never officially released a statement on the matter, the band parted ways to focus on their individual careers.

== History ==
Prior to the band's foundation, Derek Hough and sister Julianne performed as professional dancers. They and Mark Ballas competed on the ABC television series Dancing with the Stars. Before joining the roster of professional dancers of Dancing With The Stars, Mark and Derek first met when Derek's parents sent him to live in London with Corky and Shirley Ballas, Mark's parents when he was 12 years old. A few months later, Julianne joined her brother in London and the three of them attended the Italia Conti Academy of Theatre Arts.

The three had previously been members of the musical team 2B1G, whose name stood for "Two Boys, One Girl." After Julianne left this team, Mark and Derek formed another band, which they called Almost Amy, and which also included Sam Marder, Harry Sullivan and Emily Grace. This band was renamed Ballas Hough Band a short while after its members relocated to Los Angeles, California. Although they did not disclose it to their fans, in 2010 the Ballas Hough Band broke up and its members focused on their individual pursuits.

=== Debut album: BHB (2008–2009) ===
Ballas Hough Band was signed to Hollywood Records in 2008 and released its debut album, BHB, on March 10, 2009. The album spent one week on the U.S. Billboard 200, peaking at No. 98 on that chart. But its two singles, "Do It for You" and "Do You Love Me," both failed to chart. On June 21, 2009, the band announced on their MySpace page that they would be signing with Morey Management.

=== Departure from Hollywood: (2009) ===
The band appeared on the November 3, 2009 episode of Dancing With The Stars results show, on which they performed their new single, "Move." The song was intended to be the lead-off single to a second studio album. However, after the single failed to chart, they parted ways with Hollywood Records in March 2010, and the planned new album was never released. No news of any plans for another new album were available as of August 2017.

=== Current pursuits: (2010–present) ===
Derek Hough has won Dancing with the Stars a record number of six times and received the Primetime Emmy Award for Outstanding Choreography twice. Hough starred in the film Make Your Move (film) and played the role of Corny Collins in NBC's TV-production of Hairspray Live!. Hough is currently a judge on the NBC dance competition World of Dance (TV series) as well as Dancing with the Stars, and he recently signed a deal with ABC.

Mark Ballas focused on his solo career following BHB's breakup. Along with winning three times on Dancing with the Stars, Ballas performed in Broadway shows including Jersey Boys and Kinky Boots (musical). Ballas released a solo CD in 2011 (titled HurtLoveBox) and in 2015, he became part of a music duo named Alexander Jean. This duo is producing music today and also includes BC Jean, whom Ballas wed in 2016.

Emily Grace continued to pursue music, touring as a keyboardist and background singer for various artists, such as Demi Lovato, Christina Perri, and Brynn Elliott.

Sam Marder began playing bass guitar for the Irish pop folk band, Keywest, after BHB split. After playing with Keywest for several years, Marder ended up leaving the band.

Harry Sullivan played drums for the band Westar, and in 2012 he joined Marder to play for Keywest. He still plays with the Dublin-based band today, who has gained fame and recognition throughout Ireland and Europe.

== Discography ==
=== Studio albums ===
Title	Album details	Peak positions
Title	Album details	US
BHB	Release date: March 10, 2009; Label: Hollywood Records; Formats: CD, music download	98

=== Singles ===
Year	Single	Album
2009	"Do It for You"	BHB
2009	"Do You Love Me"	BHB
2009	"Move"	Non-album song
