= George Ballas =

American entrepreneur and inventor

- Born: George Charles Ballas; June 28, 1925; Ruston, Louisiana, U.S.
- Died: June 25, 2011 (aged 85); Houston, Texas, U.S.
- Occupation: Entrepreneur
- Known for: Founder of Weed Eater
- Spouse: Maria Marulanda (m. 1951)
- Children: 5, including Corky Ballas
- Relatives: Mark Ballas (grandson); Shirley Ballas (daughter-in-law)
- Military career
- Allegiance: United States
- Branch: United States Army
- Service years: 1942–1953
- Commands: Bombardier and Second Lt. and OSI Agent
- Conflicts: World War II; Korean War

George Charles Ballas Sr. (June 28, 1925 – June 25, 2011) was an American entrepreneur. He invented the first string trimmer, known as the Weed Eater in 1971. He was the father of ballroom dancer Corky Ballas and grandfather of professional dancer Mark Ballas of Dancing with the Stars.

== Early life ==
Ballas was born in Ruston, Louisiana. He was the son of Karolos ("Charles") Ballas and Maria (née Lymnaios), who were Greek immigrants that ran a restaurant. His brother is Peter Ballas.

He enlisted in the United States Army at the age of 17 in 1942 during World War II and was a bombardier. Ballas later served in the Korean War.

== Family ==
He married Maria Marulanda who was of Mexican and Spanish descent in 1951.

He had five children, including Corky Ballas.

His grandson Mark Ballas is a dancer in Dancing with the Stars. He had six other grandchildren.

== Inventor ==
Ballas got the idea for the trimmer while driving through an automatic car wash, where the rotating brushes gave him an idea. Using a tin can laced with fishing line and an edge trimmer, he tried out his idea, which worked. After some refinements, he shopped it around to several tool makers, who all rejected his invention. He went on to develop the garden tool himself. The first year, sales were over a half million dollars. By 1977 they were $80 million, and Ballas sold his company the following year to Emerson Electric Company.
