= Weedeater (disambiguation) =

A weedeater is a powered handheld device that uses a flexible monofilament line instead of a blade for cutting grass and other plants near objects.

Weedeater may also refer to:

- Weed Eater, an agricultural machinery manufacturer
- Weedeater (band), an American sludge metal band
