= Corky Ballas =

American ballroom dancer

- Born: Mark Alexander Ballas; December 25, 1960 (age 65); Houston, Texas, U.S.
- Occupation: Dancer
- Years active: 1978–1996; 2008–present
- Spouse: Shirley Rich (m. 1985; div. 2007)
- Children: Mark Ballas
- Parent(s): George Ballas; Maria Marulanda

Mark Alexander "Corky" Ballas Sr. (born December 25, 1960) is an American retired competitive ballroom dancer who holds several Latin dance championship titles. His son, Mark Ballas, is a professional dancer on Dancing with the Stars. His father was George Ballas, who invented the Weed Eater lawn-trimming device.

== Personal life ==
Ballas was born in Houston, Texas. He is the son of Greek-Americans Maria Marulanda and George Ballas, the inventor of the Weed Eater lawn-trimming device. His paternal grandparents, Karolos ("Charles") Ballas and Maria Lymnaos were immigrants to the United States from Greece. He has three sisters, Michelle, Maria, and Lillian, and one brother, George.

He has one son, Mark Ballas. Corky and Shirley Ballas also trained and assisted in raising Julianne Hough and Derek Hough.

Corky now teaches dancing in San Antonio via his dancing studio, and his website. His plans for the future include more television performances as well as an online interactive dance instruction via hundreds of videos.

== Career ==
Corky and Shirley were 1996 Open to the World International Champions, 1995–1996 Open to the World British Champions, twice British National Champions, Star - World Cup - UK - Champions, and seven times undefeated United States International Latin Champions.

Ballas judges professional competitions and teaches. He is based in Los Angeles, California and Houston, Texas.

=== Dancing with the Stars ===
Ballas has trained many of Dancing with the Stars' professionals including Karina Smirnoff, Julianne Hough, Derek Hough, Tony Dovolani, Edyta Sliwinska, Alec Mazo, Brian Fortuna, Jonathan Roberts, Anna Trebunskaya, Jessie DeSoto and, his son, Mark Ballas.

On August 25, 2008, the show's producers announced Corky himself would compete as a pro on season 7, alongside his son and former pupils. He was partnered with 82-year-old actress Cloris Leachman.

For season 11, Ballas was partnered with Florence Henderson. They were eliminated in Week 5 of the competition.

== Performances ==
=== with Cloris Leachman ===
Week	Dance	Song	Judges' score			Total	Result
Week	Dance	Song	Inaba	Goodman	Tonioli	Total	Result
1	Foxtrot	"I Wish I Were in Love Again" — Frank Sinatra	6	5	5	16	No Elimination
1	Mambo	"Coconut Woman" — Harry Belafonte	6	5	5	16	Safe
2	Paso doble	"Boléro" — Maurice Ravel	5	5	5	15	Safe
3	Jive	"The Girl Can't Help It" — Little Richard	6	5	5	16	No Elimination
4	Tango	"The Big Date" — Marc Shaiman	8	7	7	22	Bottom Two
5	Salsa	"Tres Deseos" — Gloria Estefan	7	7	7	21	Safe
6	Cha-cha-cha	"Come See About Me" — The Supremes	5	5 (Note: Michael Flatley filled in as a guest judge in Len Goodman's spot.)	5	15	Eliminated

=== with Florence Henderson ===
Week	Dance	Song	Judges' score			Total	Result
Week	Dance	Song	Inaba	Goodman	Tonioli	Total	Result
1	Cha-cha-cha	"Kiss Me, Honey Honey, Kiss Me" — Shirley Bassey	6	6	6	18	Safe
2	Quickstep	"Suddenly I See" — KT Tunstall	7	6	6	19	Safe
3	Waltz	"Edelweiss" — Vince Hill	7	6	7	20	Safe
4	Rumba	"Yesterday" — The Beatles	6	6	5	17 (Note: Couples were awarded two scores week 4. Florence & Corky received a 17 as their technical score, and an 18 for their performance score.)	Safe
4	Rumba	"Yesterday" — The Beatles	6	6	6	18 (Note: Couples were awarded two scores week 4. Florence & Corky received a 17 as their technical score, and an 18 for their performance score.)	Safe
5	Tango	"The Brady Bunch Theme" — Peppermint Trolley Company	7	7	7	21	Eliminated

== See also ==
- U.S. National Dancesport Champions (Professional Latin)
