= Dancing with the Stars (American TV series) season 11 =

Dancing with the Stars
- Season 11
- Promotional poster, featuring the celebrity cast
- Hosted by: Tom Bergeron; Brooke Burke
- Judges: Carrie Ann Inaba; Len Goodman; Bruno Tonioli
- Celebrity winner: Jennifer Grey
- Professional winner: Derek Hough
- No. of episodes: 20

Release
- Original network: ABC
- Original release: September 20 – November 23, 2010

Season chronology
- ← Previous; Season 10 Next → Season 12

Season eleven of Dancing with the Stars premiered on September 20, 2010, on the ABC network.

Several changes were introduced this season, including an "Acoustic Week," in which couples performed either the rumba or the Argentine tango while the audience was brought closer to the dance floor which was elevated and made circular. Contestants from previous seasons also came back as guest judges when the current contestants attempted re-created memorable routines in the 200th episode. These guest judges were Hélio Castroneves, Kelly Osbourne, Emmitt Smith, Drew Lachey, Gilles Marini, and Mel B. Kristi Yamaguchi and Apolo Ohno also served as team captains for team dances. There was also a week dubbed "Instant Choreography," in which the couples practiced their routines for a week, but only received the music for their Latin dances 45 minutes before their live performances.

Actress Jennifer Grey and Derek Hough were crowned the champions, while actor Kyle Massey and Lacey Schwimmer finished second, and Bristol Palin and Mark Ballas finished third.

== Cast ==
=== Couples ===
This season featured twelve celebrity contestants. The cast was announced during the August 30 episode of Bachelor Pad during a live press conference that included a Q&A session with host Tom Bergeron and co-host Brooke Burke and the new cast. The pairs were announced on September 1; however, Bristol Palin and Mark Ballas had been announced the day before by way of a Good Morning America interview.

Celebrity	Notability	Professional partner	Status
David Hasselhoff	Actor & singer	Kym Johnson	Eliminated 1st on September 21, 2010
Michael Bolton	Singer-songwriter	Chelsie Hightower	Eliminated 2nd on September 28, 2010
Margaret Cho	Stand-up comedian	Louis van Amstel	Eliminated 3rd on October 5, 2010
The Situation	Jersey Shore cast member	Karina Smirnoff	Eliminated 4th on October 12, 2010
Florence Henderson	The Brady Bunch actress	Corky Ballas	Eliminated 5th on October 19, 2010
Audrina Patridge	The Hills cast member	Tony Dovolani	Eliminated 6th on October 26, 2010
Rick Fox	NBA small forward	Cheryl Burke	Eliminated 7th on November 2, 2010
Kurt Warner	NFL quarterback	Anna Trebunskaya	Eliminated 8th on November 9, 2010
Brandy	Singer & actress	Maksim Chmerkovskiy	Eliminated 9th on November 16, 2010
Bristol Palin	Activist, author & daughter of Sarah Palin	Mark Ballas	Third place on November 23, 2010
Kyle Massey	Disney Channel actor & rapper	Lacey Schwimmer	Runners-up on November 23, 2010
Jennifer Grey	Film & television actress	Derek Hough	Winners on November 23, 2010

Future appearances

Bristol Palin returned for the All-Stars season, where she was again paired with Mark Ballas.

=== Host and judges ===
Tom Bergeron and Brooke Burke returned as co-hosts, while Carrie Ann Inaba, Bruno Tonioli, and Len Goodman returned as judges.

== Scoring chart ==
The highest score each week is indicated in bold green with a dagger (†), while the lowest score each week is indicated in italicized red with a double-dagger (‡).

Color key:

Winners
Runners-up
Third place
Eliminated

Dancing with the Stars (season 11) - Weekly scores
Couple	Pl.	Week										
Couple	Pl.	1	2	3	4 (Note: Each couple each couple received two scores from the judges this week: one for technical and one for performance.)	5	6	7	8	9	10	
Couple	Pl.	1	2	3	4	5	6	7	8	9	Night 1	Night 2
Jennifer & Derek	1st	**24**†	**24**†	24	27+29=**56**†	25	20+9=29	27+37=**64**†	27+30=**57**†	30+30=**60**†	30+30=**60**†	+30+28=**118**† (Note: This couple finished in first place.)
Kyle & Lacey	2nd	23	22	23	18+22=40	20	23+7=30	24+35=59	27+29=56	29+29=58	27+29=56	+26+28=110 (Note: This couple finished in second place.)
Bristol & Mark	3rd	18	22	19	18+14=32	18‡	23+5=28	24+33=57‡	24+23=47‡	27+26=53‡	27+25=52‡	+25+27=104‡ (Note: This couple finished in third place.)
Brandy & Maks	4th	23	21	24	22+26=48	**27**†	26+10=**36**†	27+37=**64**†	29+28=**57**†	27+30=57 (Note: This couple was eliminated.)		
Kurt & Anna	5th	19	21	23	15+19=34	24	18+4=22‡	27+34=61	24+24=48			
Rick & Cheryl	6th	22	21	24	19+20=39	24	24+6=30	24+37=61				
Audrina & Tony	7th	19	23	**26**†	24+22=46	23	24+8=32					
Florence & Corky	8th	18	19	20	17+18=35	21						
The Situation & Karina	9th	15‡	18	20	12+16=28‡							
Margaret & Louis	10th	15‡	18	18‡								
Michael & Chelsie	11th	16	12‡									
David & Kym	12th	15‡										

== Weekly scores ==
Individual judges' scores in the charts below (given in parentheses) are listed in this order from left to right: Carrie Ann Inaba, Len Goodman, Bruno Tonioli.

=== Week 1: First Dances ===
Each couple performed either the cha-cha-cha or the Viennese waltz. Couples are listed in the order they performed.

Couple	Scores	Dance	Music	Result
Audrina & Tony	19 (6, 7, 6)	Cha-cha-cha	"California Gurls" — Katy Perry, feat. Snoop Dogg	Safe
Kurt & Anna	19 (7, 5, 7)	Viennese waltz	"This Ain't a Love Song" — Bon Jovi	Safe
Kyle & Lacey	23 (8, 7, 8)	Cha-cha-cha	"My First Kiss" — 3OH!3, feat. Ke$ha	Safe
Rick & Cheryl	22 (8, 7, 7)	Viennese waltz	"Crazy" — Aerosmith	Safe
Margaret & Louis	15 (5, 5, 5)	Viennese waltz	"We Are the Champions" — Queen	Safe
Brandy & Maks	23 (7, 8, 8)	Viennese waltz	"Cry Me Out" — Pixie Lott	Safe
Bristol & Mark	18 (6, 6, 6)	Cha-cha-cha	"Mama Told Me (Not to Come)" — Tom Jones, feat. Stereophonics	Safe
Florence & Corky	18 (6, 6, 6)	Cha-cha-cha	"Kiss Me, Honey Honey, Kiss Me" — Shirley Bassey	Safe
Michael & Chelsie	16 (6, 5, 5)	Viennese waltz	"Life After You" — Daughtry	Safe
The Situation & Karina	15 (5, 5, 5)	Cha-cha-cha	"Break Your Heart" — Taio Cruz	Safe
Jennifer & Derek	24 (8, 8, 8)	Viennese waltz	"These Arms of Mine" — Otis Redding	Safe
David & Kym	15 (5, 5, 5)	Cha-cha-cha	"Sex Bomb" — Tom Jones	Eliminated

=== Week 2: Top 11 ===
Each couple performed either the jive or the quickstep. Couples are listed in the order they performed.

Couple	Scores	Dance	Music	Result
Rick & Cheryl	21 (7, 7, 7)	Jive	"Tush" — ZZ Top	Safe
Florence & Corky	19 (7, 6, 6)	Quickstep	"Suddenly I See" — KT Tunstall	Safe
Brandy & Maks	21 (7, 7, 7)	Jive	"Magic" — B.o.B, feat. Rivers Cuomo	Safe
Michael & Chelsie	12 (4, 5, 3)	Jive	"Hound Dog" — Elvis Presley	Eliminated
Audrina & Tony	23 (8, 8, 7)	Quickstep	"Love Machine" — Girls Aloud	Safe
Jennifer & Derek	24 (8, 8, 8)	Jive	"Shake It" — Metro Station	Safe
Margaret & Louis	18 (6, 6, 6)	Jive	"Dreaming" — Blondie	Safe
Kyle & Lacey	22 (8, 7, 7)	Quickstep	"(If You're Wondering If I Want You To) I Want You To" — Weezer	Safe
Kurt & Anna	21 (7, 7, 7)	Jive	"Danger Zone" — Kenny Loggins	Safe
The Situation & Karina	18 (6, 6, 6)	Quickstep	"Americano" — The Brian Setzer Orchestra	Safe
Bristol & Mark	22 (7, 8, 7)	Quickstep	"You Can't Hurry Love" — The Supremes	Safe

=== Week 3: Story Week ===
Each couple performed either the samba or the waltz. Couples are listed in the order they performed.

Couple	Scores	Dance	Music	Result
Jennifer & Derek	24 (8, 8, 8)	Samba	"A Little Respect" — Erasure	Safe
Florence & Corky	20 (7, 6, 7)	Waltz	"Edelweiss" — Vince Hill	Safe
Kurt & Anna	23 (8, 8, 7)	Foxtrot	"Bad Day" — Daniel Powter	Safe
Margaret & Louis	18 (6, 6, 6)	Samba	"Copacabana" — Barry Manilow	Eliminated
Audrina & Tony	26 (8, 9, 9)	Waltz	"Let It Be Me" — Ray LaMontagne	Safe
Bristol & Mark	19 (6, 6, 7)	Foxtrot	"Just the Way You Are" — Bruno Mars	Safe
Brandy & Maks	24 (8, 8, 8)	Samba	"Put It in a Love Song" — Alicia Keys, feat. Beyoncé	Safe
Kyle & Lacey	23 (8, 7, 8)	Waltz	"Falling in Love at a Coffee Shop" — Landon Pigg	Safe
The Situation & Karina	20 (7, 6, 7)	Foxtrot	"Boom Boom Pow" — The Black Eyed Peas	Safe
Rick & Cheryl	24 (8, 8, 8)	Samba	"Whine Up" — Kat DeLuna, feat. Elephant Man	Safe

=== Week 4: Acoustic Week ===
Each couple performed either the Argentine tango or the rumba. Couples are listed in the order they performed.

Couple	Technical scores	Performance scores	Dance	Music	Result
Kurt & Anna	15 (5, 5, 5)	19 (7, 6, 6)	Rumba	"Drops of Jupiter (Tell Me)" — Train	Safe
Brandy & Maks	22 (7, 8, 7)	26 (9, 8, 9)	Rumba	"This Woman's Work" — Kate Bush	Safe
Rick & Cheryl	19 (6, 7, 6)	20 (6, 7, 7)	Argentine tango	"Violentango" — Astor Piazzolla	Safe
Kyle & Lacey	18 (6, 6, 6)	22 (8, 7, 7)	Rumba	"Nothin' on You" — B.o.B, feat. Bruno Mars	Safe
The Situation & Karina	12 (4, 4, 4)	16 (6, 5, 5)	Argentine tango	"Sweet Dreams (Are Made Of This)" — Tanghetto	Eliminated
Florence & Corky	17 (6, 6, 5)	18 (6, 6, 6)	Rumba	"Yesterday" — The Beatles	Safe
Jennifer & Derek	27 (9, 9, 9)	29 (10, 9, 10)	Argentine tango	"La Cumparsita" — Gerardo Matos Rodríguez	Safe
Bristol & Mark	18 (6, 6, 6)	14 (4, 5, 5)	Rumba	"Umbrella" — Rihanna, feat. Jay-Z	Safe
Audrina & Tony	24 (8, 8, 8)	22 (8, 7, 7)	Argentine tango	"Somebody to Love" — Jefferson Airplane	Safe

=== Week 5: TV Week ===
Couples are listed in the order they performed.

Couple	Scores	Dance	Music	Television show	Result
Brandy & Maks	27 (9, 9, 9)	Quickstep	"I'll Be There for You" — The Rembrandts	Friends	Safe
Florence & Corky	21 (7, 7, 7)	Tango	"The Brady Bunch Theme" — Peppermint Trolley Company	The Brady Bunch	Eliminated
Kurt & Anna	24 (8, 8, 8)	Quickstep	"Bewitched Theme" — The Hit Crew	Bewitched	Safe
Audrina & Tony	23 (7, 8, 8)	Rumba	"Unwritten" — Natasha Bedingfield	The Hills	Safe
Kyle & Lacey	20 (8, 5, 7)	Foxtrot	"Charlie's Angels Theme" — The Hit Crew	Charlie's Angels	Safe
Rick & Cheryl	24 (8, 8, 8)	Rumba	"Hill Street Blues" — Larry Carlton	Hill Street Blues	Safe
Bristol & Mark	18 (6, 6, 6)	Jive	"(Theme From) The Monkees" — The Monkees	The Monkees	Safe
Jennifer & Derek	25 (8, 8, 9)	Foxtrot	"Love and Marriage" — Frank Sinatra	Married... with Children	Safe

=== Week 6: Rock Week ===
Each couple performed either the paso doble or the tango, plus a rock and roll dance marathon for extra points. Couples are listed in the order they performed.

Couple	Scores	Dance	Music	Result
Audrina & Tony	24 (8, 8, 8)	Paso doble	"Another One Bites the Dust" — Queen	Eliminated
Kyle & Lacey	23 (8, 7, 8)	Tango	"If I Had You" — Adam Lambert	Safe
Jennifer & Derek	20 (6, 7, 7)	Paso doble	"So What" — Pink	Safe
Rick & Cheryl	24 (8, 8, 8)	Tango	"You Really Got Me" — The Kinks	Safe
Bristol & Mark	23 (8, 7, 8)	Tango	"According to You" — Orianthi	Safe
Kurt & Anna	18 (6, 6, 6)	Paso doble	"The Final Countdown" — Europe	Safe
Brandy & Maks	26 (8, 9, 9)	Tango	"Holding Out for a Hero" — Bonnie Tyler	Safe
Kurt & Anna	4	Rock and roll Marathon	"La Grange" — ZZ Top	
Bristol & Mark	5	Rock and roll Marathon	"La Grange" — ZZ Top	
Rick & Cheryl	6	Rock and roll Marathon	"La Grange" — ZZ Top	
Kyle & Lacey	7	Rock and roll Marathon	"La Grange" — ZZ Top	
Audrina & Tony	8	Rock and roll Marathon	"La Grange" — ZZ Top	
Jennifer & Derek	9	Rock and roll Marathon	"La Grange" — ZZ Top	
Brandy & Maks	10	Rock and roll Marathon	"La Grange" — ZZ Top	

=== Week 7: 200th Episode Week ===
Couples are listed in the order they performed.

Couple	Team captain	Scores	Dance	Music
Bristol & Mark Kyle & Lacey Rick & Cheryl	Kristi Yamaguchi	24 (8, 8, 8)	Cha-cha-cha	"Workin' Day and Night" — Michael Jackson
Brandy & Maks Jennifer & Derek Kurt & Anna	Apolo Anton Ohno	27 (9, 9, 9)	Cha-cha-cha	"Bust a Move" — Young MC

Individual judges' scores in the chart below (given in parentheses) are listed in this order from left to right: Guest judge, Carrie Ann Inaba, Len Goodman, Bruno Tonioli

Couple	Guest judge	Scores	Dance	Music	Result
Kyle & Lacey	Mel B	35 (10, 9, 8, 8)	Paso doble	"Free Your Mind" — En Vogue	Safe
Kurt & Anna	Emmitt Smith	34 (10, 8, 8, 8)	Tango	"Simply Irresistible" — Robert Palmer	Safe
Bristol & Mark	Kelly Osbourne	33 (9, 8, 8, 8)	Viennese waltz	"Trouble" — Ray LaMontagne	Safe
Rick & Cheryl	Hélio Castroneves	37 (10, 9, 9, 9)	Quickstep	"Hey! Pachuco!" — Royal Crown Revue	Eliminated
Brandy & Maks	Gilles Marini	37 (9, 9, 10, 9)	Foxtrot	"Fever" — Peggy Lee	Safe
Jennifer & Derek	Drew Lachey	37 (10, 9, 9, 9)	Tango	"Shut Up" — The Black Eyed Peas	Safe

=== Week 8: Instant Choreography Week ===
Couples are listed in the order they performed.

Couple	Scores	Dance	Music	Result
Kyle & Lacey	27 (9, 9, 9)	Viennese waltz	"Breathe (2 AM)" — Anna Nalick	Safe
Kyle & Lacey	29 (10, 9, 10)	Jive	"Good Golly Miss Molly" — Little Richard	Safe
Jennifer & Derek	27 (9, 9, 9)	Quickstep	"Let's Face the Music and Dance" — Nat King Cole	Safe
Jennifer & Derek	30 (10, 10, 10)	Instant Rumba	"Waiting for a Girl Like You" — Foreigner	Safe
Kurt & Anna	24 (8, 8, 8)	Waltz	"Take It to the Limit" — The Eagles	Eliminated
Kurt & Anna	24 (8, 8, 8)	Instant Cha-cha-cha	"Hella Good" — No Doubt	Eliminated
Bristol & Mark	24 (8, 8, 8)	Argentine tango	"Buttons" — Pussycat Dolls	Safe
Bristol & Mark	23 (7, 8, 8)	Instant Samba	"Mas que Nada" — Sérgio Mendes, feat. The Black Eyed Peas	Safe
Brandy & Maks	29 (9, 10, 10)	Waltz	"Dark Waltz" — Hayley Westenra	Safe
Brandy & Maks	28 (9, 9, 10)	Instant Cha-cha-cha	"Teenage Dream" — Katy Perry	Safe

=== Week 9: Semifinals ===
Couples are listed in the order they performed.

Couple	Scores	Dance	Music	Result
Brandy & Maks	27 (9, 9, 9)	Paso doble	"Firework" — Katy Perry	Eliminated
Brandy & Maks	30 (10, 10, 10)	Argentine tango	"Taquito Militar" — Mariano Mores	Eliminated
Jennifer & Derek	30 (10, 10, 10)	Cha-cha-cha	"Mercy" — Duffy	Safe
Jennifer & Derek	30 (10, 10, 10)	Waltz	"Way Over Yonder" — Carole King	Safe
Bristol & Mark	27 (9, 9, 9)	Paso doble	"Gimme More" — Britney Spears	Safe
Bristol & Mark	26 (8, 9, 9)	Waltz	"Mary Goes to Jesus" — from The Passion of the Christ	Safe
Kyle & Lacey	29 (10, 9, 10)	Samba	"She's Got Me Dancing" — Tommy Sparks	Safe
Kyle & Lacey	29 (10, 9, 10)	Argentine tango	"Jai Ho! (You Are My Destiny)" — A. R. Rahman & The Pussycat Dolls	Safe

=== Week 10: Finals ===
On the first night, the three couples performed two dances: a redemption dance selected by one of the judges, which was a style they had already performed earlier in the competition, and their freestyle routine. On the second night, each couple performed their favorite dance and then competed in a cha-cha-cha relay. Couples are listed in the order they performed.

Night 1

Couple	Judge	Scores	Dance	Music
Kyle & Lacey	Len Goodman	27 (9, 9, 9)	Foxtrot	"Feeling Good" — Nina Simone
Kyle & Lacey	Len Goodman	29 (10, 9, 10)	Freestyle	"Tootsee Roll" — 69 Boyz
Bristol & Mark	Bruno Tonioli	27 (9, 9, 9)	Jive	"Move (You're Steppin' on My Heart)" — from Dreamgirls
Bristol & Mark	Bruno Tonioli	25 (8, 9, 8)	Freestyle	"Cell Block Tango" — from Chicago
Jennifer & Derek	Carrie Ann Inaba	30 (10, 10, 10)	Paso doble	"Habanera" — Charlotte Church
Jennifer & Derek	Carrie Ann Inaba	30 (10, 10, 10)	Freestyle	"Do You Love Me?" — The Contours

Night 2

Couple	Scores	Dance	Music	Result
Kyle & Lacey	26 (9, 8, 9)	Tango	"If I Had You" — Adam Lambert	Runners-up
Bristol & Mark	25 (8, 9, 8)	Tango	"According to You" — Orianthi	Third place
Jennifer & Derek	30 (10, 10, 10)	Viennese waltz	"These Arms of Mine" — Otis Redding	Winners
Kyle & Lacey	28 (9, 9, 10)	Cha-cha-cha; Relay	"Raise Your Glass" — Pink	
Jennifer & Derek	28 (9, 9, 10)	Cha-cha-cha; Relay	"Raise Your Glass" — Pink	
Bristol & Mark	27 (9, 9, 9)	Cha-cha-cha; Relay	"Raise Your Glass" — Pink	

== Dance chart ==
The couples performed the following each week:

- Week 1: One unlearned dance (cha-cha-cha or Viennese waltz)
- Week 2: One unlearned dance (jive or quickstep)
- Week 3: One unlearned dance (samba or waltz)
- Week 4: One unlearned dance (Argentine tango or rumba)
- Week 5: One unlearned dance
- Week 6: One unlearned dance (paso doble or tango) & rock and roll marathon
- Week 7: Team dance & one unlearned dance
- Week 8: One unlearned dance & instant dance
- Week 9 (Semifinals): Two unlearned dances
- Week 10 (Finals, Night 1): Judge's choice & freestyle
- Week 10 (Finals, Night 2): Favorite dance & cha-cha-cha relay

Dancing with the Stars (season 11) - Dance chart
Couple	Week																
Couple	1	2	3	4	5	6		7		8		9		10			
Couple	1	2	3	4	5	6		7		8		9		Night 1		Night 2	
Jennifer & Derek	Viennese waltz	Jive	Samba	Argentine tango	Foxtrot	Paso doble	Rock and roll Marathon	Team; Cha-cha-cha	Tango	Quickstep	Rumba	Cha-cha-cha	Waltz	Paso doble	Freestyle	Viennese waltz	Cha-cha-cha; Relay
Kyle & Lacey	Cha-cha-cha	Quickstep	Waltz	Rumba	Foxtrot	Tango	Rock and roll Marathon	Team; Cha-cha-cha	Paso doble	Viennese waltz	Jive	Samba	Argentine tango	Foxtrot	Freestyle	Tango	Cha-cha-cha; Relay
Bristol & Mark	Cha-cha-cha	Quickstep	Foxtrot	Rumba	Jive	Tango	Rock and roll Marathon	Team; Cha-cha-cha	Viennese waltz	Argentine tango	Samba	Paso doble	Waltz	Jive	Freestyle	Tango	Cha-cha-cha; Relay
Brandy & Maks	Viennese waltz	Jive	Samba	Rumba	Quickstep	Tango	Rock and roll Marathon	Team; Cha-cha-cha	Foxtrot	Waltz	Cha-cha-cha	Paso doble	Argentine tango				
Kurt & Anna	Viennese waltz	Jive	Foxtrot	Rumba	Quickstep	Paso doble	Rock and roll Marathon	Team; Cha-cha-cha	Tango	Waltz	Cha-cha-cha						
Rick & Cheryl	Viennese waltz	Jive	Samba	Argentine tango	Rumba	Tango	Rock and roll Marathon	Team; Cha-cha-cha	Quickstep								
Audrina & Tony	Cha-cha-cha	Quickstep	Waltz	Argentine tango	Rumba	Paso doble	Rock and roll Marathon										
Florence & Corky	Cha-cha-cha	Quickstep	Waltz	Rumba	Tango												
The Situation & Karina	Cha-cha-cha	Quickstep	Foxtrot	Argentine tango													
Margaret & Louis	Viennese waltz	Jive	Samba														
Michael & Chelsie	Viennese waltz	Jive															
David & Kym	Cha-cha-cha																

== Ratings ==
Week	Viewers (in millions)	
Week	Performance Show	Results Show
1	21	18.31
2	21.341	17.338
3	19.889	16.695
4	19.526	16.079
5	19.330	15.530
6	20.412	15.931
7	19.934	16.932
8	19.952	16.963
9	20.679	17.22
10	23.702	24.19
