= Weed Eater =

American agricultural machinery manufacturer

- Trade name: Weed Eater
- Industry: Agricultural
- Founded: 1971
- Founder: George C. Ballas, Sr.
- Headquarters: Houston, Texas
- Website: www.weedeater.com

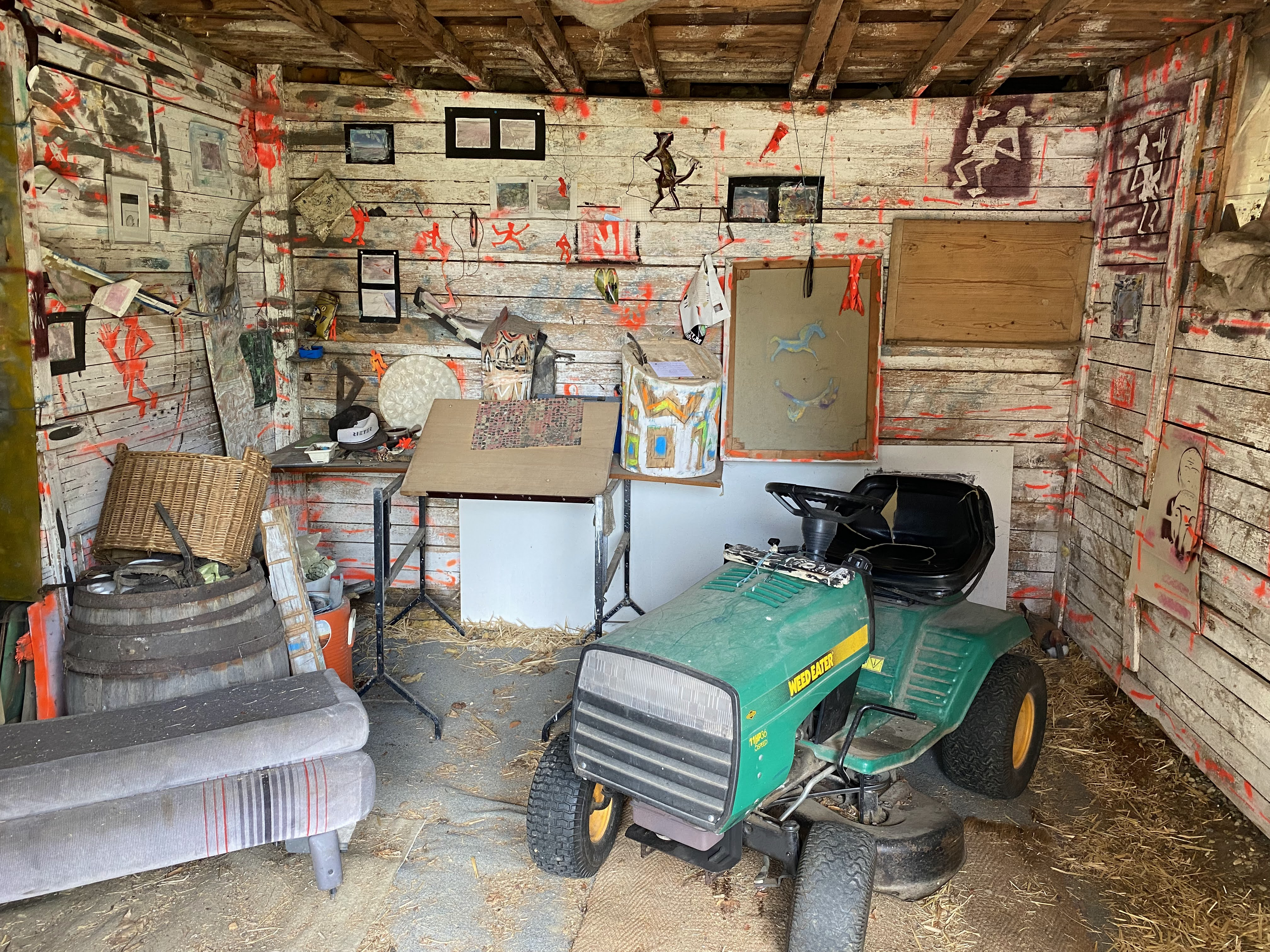
Weed Eater in Schupen

Weed Eater is a string trimmer company founded in 1971 in Houston, Texas by George C. Ballas, Sr., the inventor of the device.

The idea for the Weed Eater trimmer came to him from the spinning nylon bristles of an automatic car wash. He thought that he could come up with a similar technique to protect the bark on trees that he was trimming around. His company was eventually bought by Emerson Electric and merged with Poulan. Poulan/Weed Eater was later purchased by Electrolux, which spun off the outdoors division as Husqvarna AB in 2006. Husqvarna revived the Weed Eater brand in the US in 2023 and Canada in 2024.

Ballas was the father of champion ballroom dancer Corky Ballas and the grandfather of Dancing with the Stars dancer Mark Ballas. He died on June 25, 2011.
