= Mark Ballas =

American professional dancer and musician (born 1986)

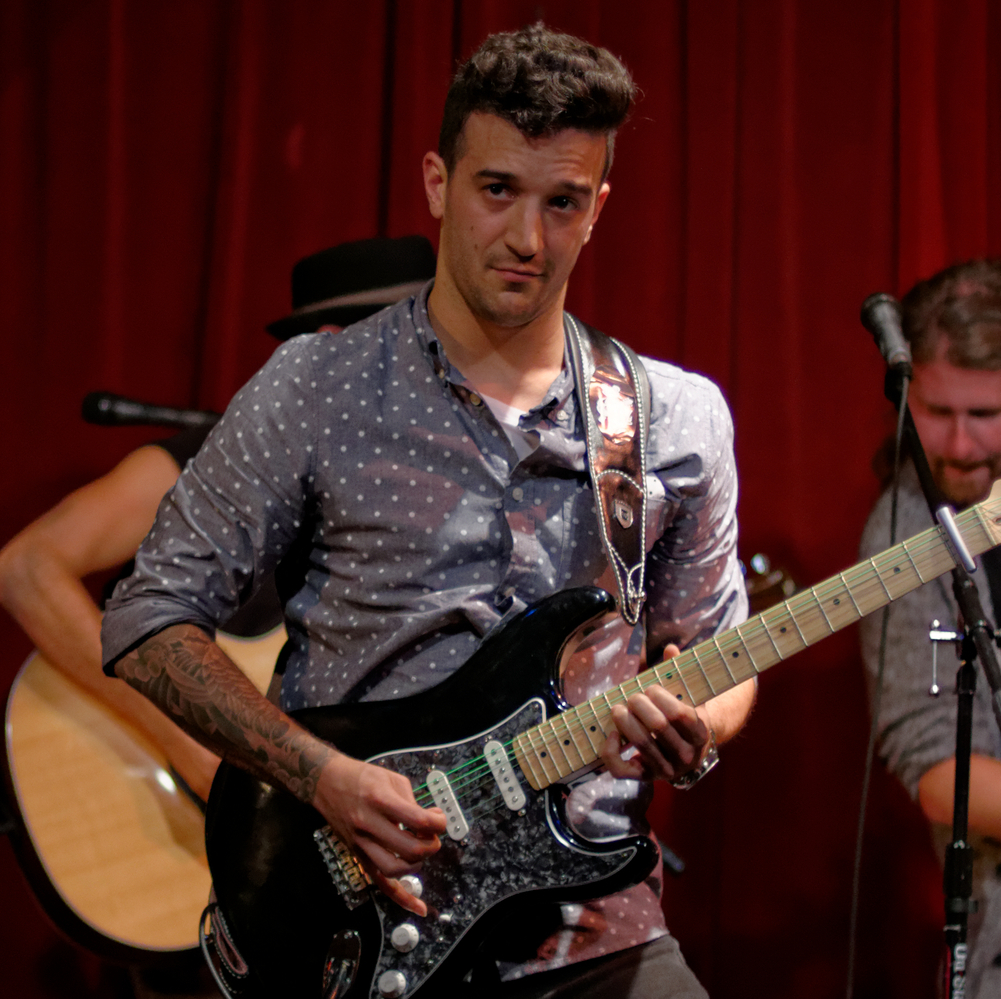
- Ballas performing in June 2014
- Born: Mark Alexander Ballas Jr. May 24, 1986 (age 40); Houston, Texas, U.S.
- Occupations: Dancer; choreographer; singer-songwriter; musician; actor
- Years active: 2005–present
- Television: Dancing with the Stars
- Spouse: BC Jean (m. 2016)
- Children: 1
- Parent(s): Corky Ballas (father); Shirley Ballas (mother)
- Relatives: George Ballas (paternal grandfather)
- Musical career
- Instruments: Vocals; guitar
- Labels: HitPlay; Hollywood
- Member of: Alexander Jean
- Formerly of: Ballas Hough Band

Mark Alexander Ballas Jr. (born May 24, 1986) is a British-American professional Latin and ballroom dancer, choreographer, musician, and actor. Since 2007, he has appeared as a pro on the ABC reality competition program Dancing with the Stars, winning the series three times. He earned a nomination for a Primetime Emmy Award for Outstanding Choreography for his work on the show.

== Early Life ==
Mark Alexander Ballas Jr. was born on May 24, 1986, in Houston, Texas. He is the only child of professional ballroom dancers Corky Ballas and Shirley Ballas (née Rich); his father is an American of Greek ancestry, and his mother is British with predominantly English ancestry and distant Irish and Cape Coloured heritage. His paternal grandfather, George Ballas, was the inventor of the Weed Eater lawn-trimming device.

Ballas attended Rosemead Preparatory School in South London. At the age of 11, he earned a full-time slot at the Italia Conti Academy of Theatre Arts in London, as well as earning a full scholarship. In 2005, he was awarded "Performer of the Year".

== Career ==
=== Competitive dancing ===
Ballas won championships at The British Open to the World, The US Open to the World, and The International Open to the World. With his former partner Julianne Hough, he won the Junior Latin American Dance Championship and the gold medal at the Junior Olympics.

=== Acting ===
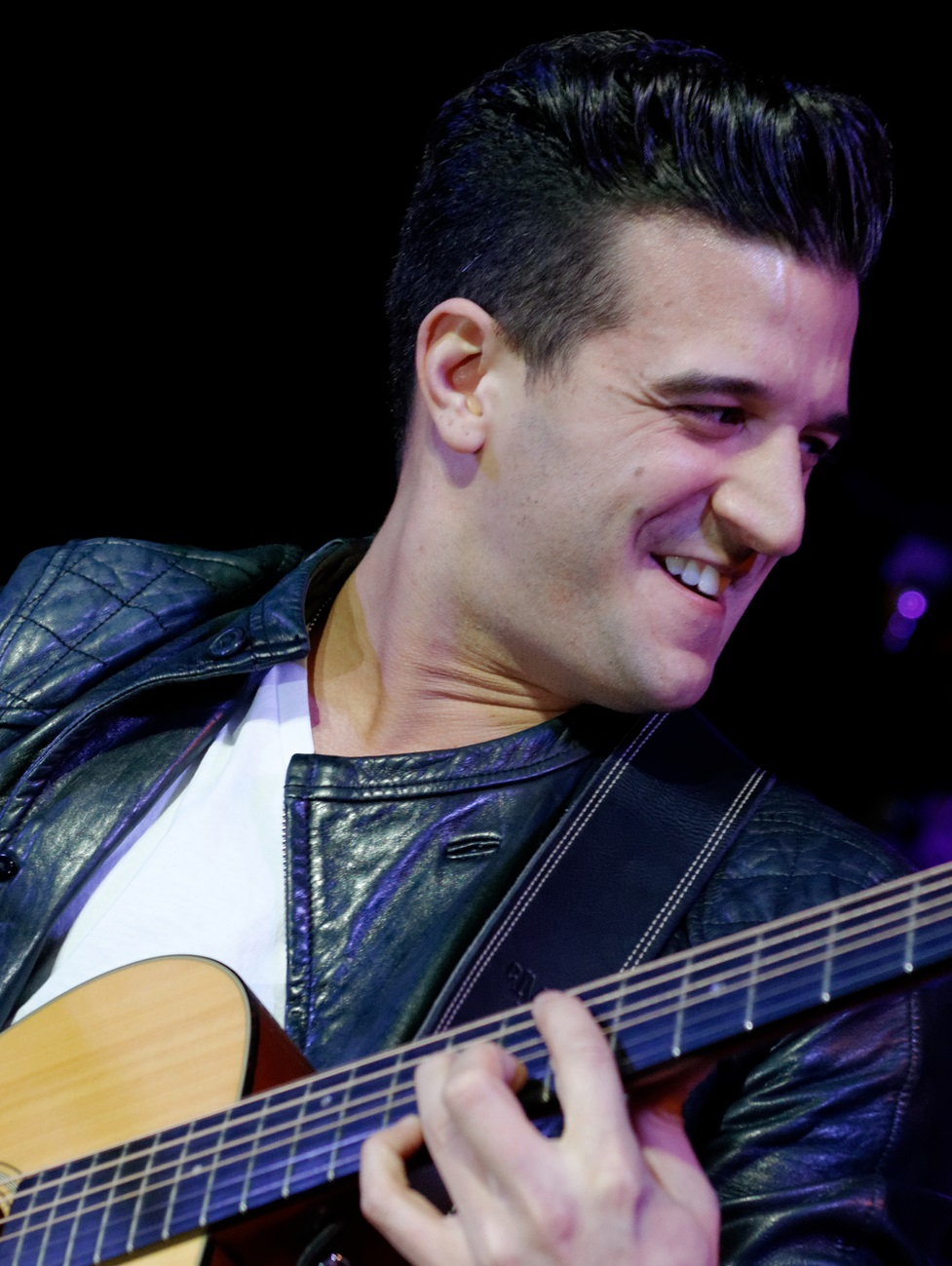
Ballas in 2013

As an actor, Ballas played the lead role of Tony in the musical Copacabana and was the lead dancer in the UK national tour of the Spanish musical Maria de Buenos Aires. He was also the understudy for the role of Ritchie Valens in the UK national tour of Buddy, The Buddy Holly Story. Ballas played an extra in Harry Potter and the Sorcerer's Stone as part of the Hufflepuff House. In October 2008, Ballas made a guest appearance on the season premiere of Samantha Who.

On September 6, 2016, it was announced that Ballas would be the final actor to portray the role of Frankie Valli in the Broadway cast of Jersey Boys before it closes in 2017. On May 26, 2018, it was announced that he would play the role of the Teen Angel in the 2018 Toronto revival of Grease in a limited engagement from June 7–10. From September 11, 2018, to November 18, 2018, Ballas portrayed Charlie Price in the musical Kinky Boots on Broadway. In July 2022, he appeared as Harry in the Hollywood Bowl production of the same show.

=== Dancing with the Stars ===
On the fifth season of Dancing with the Stars, Ballas was partnered with Cheetah Girls star Sabrina Bryan. On October 30, 2007, the pair was voted off the show. They have been the only couple invited back for an exhibition dance.

Ballas's partner for season 6 of Dancing with the Stars was Olympic Gold Medal-winning figure skater Kristi Yamaguchi. They won the season.

On August 25, 2008, ABC announced the cast of the seventh season of Dancing with the Stars, with Ballas paired with reality television star Kim Kardashian. They were the third couple eliminated, finishing in eleventh place, on September 30, 2008.

For the eighth season of Dancing with the Stars, Ballas was paired with Olympic gold-medal winning gymnast Shawn Johnson, winning that season's competition on May 19, 2009.

He was partnered with actress Melissa Joan Hart for the show's ninth season. They were voted off in week six and came in 9th place.

For season 10, Ballas was partnered with actress Shannen Doherty. They were the first couple eliminated, on March 30, 2010. Despite that, Shannen & Mark hold a higher average than a few celebrities who lasted longer than they did.

For season 11, Ballas was partnered with Bristol Palin, daughter of former Alaska governor and U.S. Vice-Presidential candidate Sarah Palin. They made it to the finale and finished in third place.

For season 12, Ballas was partnered with Disney Channel star Chelsea Kane. They made it to the finals where they finished in third place. For his choreography with Kane, specifically the Jive ("I Write Sins Not Tragedies"), Viennese Waltz ("Hedwig's Theme") and Waltz ("My Love") dances, Ballas was nominated for that year's Primetime Emmy Award for Outstanding Choreography.

For season 13, Ballas was partnered with reality star Kristin Cavallari where they were the 3rd couple eliminated finishing in 10th place. In spite of this, they retained a higher average than a few couples that easily outlasted them, including Nancy Grace & Tristan MacManus, the quarter-finalists of the season.

For season 14, he was partnered with Classical Singer Katherine Jenkins. They made it to the finale where they finished as the runners-up, losing to Donald Driver & Peta Murgatroyd.

For season 15, he returned with season 11 partner, Bristol Palin before being eliminated in week 4. In week 7, he danced with his former partner Shawn Johnson because her partner, Derek Hough suffered a neck injury.

He was paired with two-time Olympic champion Aly Raisman for season 16. Since season 16 had four couples reach the finals for the first time, Aly and Mark were able to become finalists. On May 21, however, they were eliminated at the beginning of the show landing them in fourth place.

For season 17, he was paired with singer Christina Milian. They were the 4th couple eliminated despite receiving the first 10 of the season.

For season 18, he partnered with Full House actress Candace Cameron Bure. The couple made it to the finals and ended in third place.

For season 19, he partnered with Duck Dynasty star Sadie Robertson and finished in 2nd place behind Alfonso Ribeiro.

For season 20, he was paired with star of The Hunger Games film series Willow Shields. The couple was shockingly eliminated in week 7, finishing in seventh place despite receiving high scores throughout the season.

For season 21, he was partnered with actress Alexa PenaVega. They were shockingly eliminated in week 9 (despite having a perfect night) and finished the competition in 6th place.

For season 22, he was paired with UFC mixed martial artist Paige VanZant. Ballas and VanZant made it to the finals of the show and finished in second place. Ballas was not part of the season 23 & 24 cast.

Ballas returned as a professional dancer for season 25, and was paired with violinist Lindsey Stirling. Ballas and Stirling made it to the finals and finished in second place.

Ballas returned to the show for season 31. He was partnered with social media personality and dancer Charli D'Amelio. They won the competition, making this Ballas' third win on the show and his first win since Season 8.

Ballas returned to the show for season 34 after a two year break. He was partnered with The Secret Lives of Mormon Wives star Whitney Leavitt. Despite receiving the highest cumulative points in the season at the time, Ballas and Leavitt were eliminated during the semifinals on November 18, 2025, finishing in sixth place.

Ballas was paired for season 35 with model and fellow Traitors season 4 co-star Maura Higgins.

==== Celebrity partners ====
Season	Partner	Place	Average
5	Sabrina Bryan	7th	27.0
6	Kristi Yamaguchi	1st	28.33
7	Kim Kardashian	11th	18.0
8	Shawn Johnson	1st	26.94
9	Melissa Joan Hart	9th	21.17
10	Shannen Doherty	11th	19.0
11	Bristol Palin	3rd	22.59
12	Chelsea Kane	3rd	26.13
13	Kristin Cavallari	10th	21.67
14	Katherine Jenkins	2nd	27.87
15	Bristol Palin	9th	21.0
16	Alexandra Raisman	4th	26.71
17	Christina Milian	9th	25.0
18	Candace Cameron Bure	3rd	25.47*
19	Sadie Robertson	2nd	26.72*
20	Willow Shields	7th	25.50*
21	Alexa PenaVega	6th	25.75
22	Paige VanZant	2nd	27.13
25	Lindsey Stirling	2nd	27.06
31	Charli D'Amelio	1st	28.29*
34	Whitney Leavitt	6th	26.88*
35	Maura Higgins	TBD	TBD

==== Performance Record ====
- Season 5 with celebrity partner Sabrina Bryan (average: 27.0); placed 7th

Week #	Dance/Song	Judges' score			Result
Week #	Dance/Song	Inaba	Goodman	Tonioli	Result
2	Quickstep / "They're Red Hot"	9	8	9	Safe
3	Jive / "Shake, Rattle and Roll"	9	9	9	Safe
4	Paso Doble / "You Spin Me Round (Like a Record)"	10	10	10	Safe
5	Rumba / "Me and Mrs. Jones"	9	9	10	Safe
6	Foxtrot / "I'm a Woman"	9	8	8	Eliminated

- Season 6 with celebrity partner Kristi Yamaguchi (average: 28.33); placed 1st

Week #	Dance/Song	Judges' score			Result
Week #	Dance/Song	Inaba	Goodman	Tonioli	Result
1	Foxtrot / "The More I See You"	9	9	9	No Elimination
2	Mambo / "Hey Baby"	9	9	9	Safe
3	Tango / "Rio"	9	9	9	Safe
4	Paso Doble / "Blue Monday"	10	9	10	Safe
5	Rumba / "Say"	9	10	10	Safe
6	Jive / "Rip It Up"	10	10	10	Safe
7	Viennese Waltz / "I'm with You"; Cha-Cha-Cha / "Don't Stop the Music"	9; 10	8; 8	9; 10	Safe
8 Quarter-Finals	Quickstep / "Billy A Dick"; Samba / "Volare"	9; 8	10; 9	10; 9	Safe
9 Semi-finals	Tango / "Midnight Tango"; Jive / "Nutbush City Limits"	10; 9	9; 9	10; 10	Safe
10; Finals	Cha-Cha-Cha / "Dancing on the Ceiling"; Freestyle / "Workin' Day and Night"; Jive / "Rip It Up"	10; 10; 10	10; 10; 10	10; 10; 10	Won

- Season 7 with celebrity partner Kim Kardashian (average: 18.0); placed 11th

Week #	Dance/Song	Judges' score			Result
Week #	Dance/Song	Inaba	Goodman	Tonioli	Result
1	Foxtrot / "The Pink Panther Theme"	6	7	6	Last To Be Called Safe
1	Mambo / "Baby Got Back"	6	6	6	Safe
2	Rumba / "You Give Me Something"	6	6	5	Eliminated

- Season 8 with celebrity partner Shawn Johnson (average: 26.94); placed 1st

Week #	Dance/Song	Judges' score			Result
Week #	Dance/Song	Inaba	Goodman	Tonioli	Result
1	Waltz / "It is You (I Have Loved)"	8	8	7	No Elimination
2	Salsa / "Las Muchachas"	8	8	8	Safe
3	Foxtrot / "More Than This"	9	9	9	Safe
4	Lindy Hop / "Ready Teddy"	8	8	9	Safe
5	Viennese Waltz / "Ordinary Day"	9	8	9	Safe
6	Rumba / "Slow Dancing in a Burning Room"	8	9	9	Safe
7	Cha-Cha-Cha / "P.Y.T. (Pretty Young Thing)"	9	9	10	Safe
8	Samba / "Get Down on It"; Team Mambo / "Single Ladies (Put a Ring on It)"	10; 8	8; 8	9; 9	Safe
9 Quarter-Finals	Quickstep / "Friend Like Me"; Paso Doble / "Gotta Get thru This"	9; 10	9; 9	9; 10	Safe
10; Semi-finals	Argentine Tango / "Asi Se Baila El Tango"; Jive / "Reet Petite"	10; 9	10; 8	10; 9	Safe
11; Finals	Paso Doble / "So What"; Freestyle / "Do Your Thing"; Cha-Cha-Cha / "P.Y.T. (Pretty Young Thing)"	9; 10; 10	9; 10; 10	10; 10; 10	Won

- Season 9 with celebrity partner Melissa Joan Hart (average: 21.17); placed 9th

Week #	Dance/Song	Judges' score			Result
Week #	Dance/Song	Inaba	Goodman	Tonioli	Result
1	Viennese Waltz / "The Time of My Life"; Cha-Cha-Cha Relay / "Centerfold"	6 Awarded	6; 6	6 Points	Safe
2	Jive / "Long Tall Sally"	7	6^{1}	6	Safe
3	Samba / "Turn Me On"	6	6	7	Safe
4	Charleston / "Charleston"	9	9	10	Safe
5	Argentine Tango / "Tango Barbaro"	8	8	7	Safe
6	Waltz / "Only One Road"; Mambo Marathon / "Ran Kan Kan"	7 Awarded	7; 4	6 Points	Eliminated
^{1}Score from stand-in guest judge Baz Luhrmann

- Season 10 with celebrity partner Shannen Doherty (average: 19.0); placed 11th

Week #	Dance/Song	Judges' score			Result
Week #	Dance/Song	Inaba	Goodman	Tonioli	Result
1	Viennese Waltz / "The Killing Moon"	6	6	6	No Elimination
2	Jive / "Shake a Tail Feather"	7	6	7	Eliminated

- Season 11 with celebrity partner Bristol Palin (average: 22.59); placed 3rd

Week #	Dance/Song	Judges' score			Result
Week #	Dance/Song	Inaba	Goodman	Tonioli	Result
1	Cha-Cha-Cha / "Mama Told Me (Not to Come)"	6	6	6	Safe
2	Quickstep / "You Can't Hurry Love"	7	8	7	Safe
3	Foxtrot / "Just the Way You Are"	6	6	7	Last To Be Called Safe
4	Rumba / "Umbrella"	6/4	6/5	6/5	Last To Be Called Safe
5	Jive / "(Theme From) The Monkees"	6	6	6	Safe
6	Tango / "According To You"; Rock 'n Roll / "La Grange"	8 Awarded	7; 5	8 Points	Safe
7	Viennese Waltz / "Trouble"; Team Cha-Cha-Cha / "Workin' Day and Night"	9/8; 8	8; 8	8; 8	Safe
8 Quarter-Finals	Argentine Tango / "Buttons"; Samba / "Mas Que Nada"	8; 7	8; 8	8; 8	Safe
9 Semi-finals	Paso Doble / "Gimme More"; Waltz / "Mary Goes To Jesus"	9; 8	9; 9	9; 9	Last To Be Called Safe
10; Finals	Jive / "Move"; Freestyle / "Cell Block Tango"; Tango / "According to You"; Cha-Cha-Cha / "Raise Your Glass"	9; 8; 8; 9	9; 9; 9; 9	9; 8; 8; 9	3rd place

- Season 12 with celebrity partner: Chelsea Kane (average: 26.13); placed 3rd

Week #	Dance/Song	Judges' score			Result
Week #	Dance/Song	Inaba	Goodman	Tonioli	Result
1	Foxtrot / "King of Anything"	7	7	7	No Elimination
2	Jive / "I Write Sins Not Tragedies"	6	5	7	Safe
3	Cha-Cha-Cha / "Chelsea"	7	8	8	Safe
4	Viennese Waltz / "Hedwig's Theme"	9	8	9	Safe
5	Samba / "Party in the U.S.A."	9	8	9	Safe
6	Quickstep / "Walking on Sunshine"	10	9	9	Safe
7	Paso Doble / "Ghosts 'n' Stuff"; Team Cha-Cha-Cha / "Born This Way"	8^{1}/9; 8^{1}/8	8; 7	9; 7	Last To Be Called Safe
8 Quarter-Finals	Waltz / "My Love"; Salsa / "Get Busy"	10; 8	9; 9	10; 9	Safe
9 Semi-finals	Argentine Tango / "Assassin's Tango"; Rumba / "Eyes On Fire"; Cha-Cha-Cha / "Just Dance"	9; 10; Awarded	9; 10; 15	10; 10 points	Safe
10; Finals	Samba / "Hip Hip Chin Chin"; Freestyle / "Latinos"; Viennese Waltz / "Hedwig's Theme"	10; 10; 10	9; 10; 10	10; 10; 10	3rd place
^{1}Score from guest judge Donnie Burns

- Season 13 with celebrity partner: Kristin Cavallari (average: 21.67); placed 10th

Week #	Dance/Song	Judges' score			Result
Week #	Dance/Song	Inaba	Goodman	Tonioli	Result
1	Cha-Cha-Cha / "Dynamite"	7	6	6	Safe
2	Quickstep / "Diamonds Are a Girl's Best Friend"	8	7	7	Safe
3	Samba / "Crazy in Love"	8	8	8	Eliminated

- Season 14 with celebrity partner: Katherine Jenkins (average: 27.87); placed 2nd

Week #	Dance/Song	Judges' score			Result
Week #	Dance/Song	Inaba	Goodman	Tonioli	Result
1	Foxtrot / "The Show"	9	8	9	No Elimination
2	Jive / "Ain't Nothing Wrong With That"	9	8	9	Safe
3	Waltz / "To Where You Are"	10	9	10	Safe
4	Paso Doble / "Time Is Running Out"	8	8	8	Safe
5	Argentine Tango / "Tanguedia II"	10	9	10	Safe
6	Samba / "I Can't Get Next to You"; Motown Marathon / "Nowhere to Run"	10; Awarded	9; 10	10; Points	Safe
7	Rumba / "Canon in D Major"; Team Tango / "Toccata"	9; 10	9; 8	9; 9	Safe
8 Quarter-Finals	Viennese Waltz / "Kathleen"; Cha-Cha-Cha (Trio Challenge) / "She's a Lady"	8; 10	9; 9	9; 10	Safe
9 Semi-finals	Quickstep / "The Dirty Boogie"; Salsa / "Bananza (Belly Dancer)"	10; 9	9; 9	10; 9	Safe
10; Finals	Paso Doble / "España cañí" Freestyle / "Sing, Sing, Sing (With a Swing)"; Jive / "Splish Splash"	10; 10; 10	10; 10; 10	10; 10; 10	Runner-up

- Season 15 (All-Stars) with celebrity partner: Bristol Palin (average: 21.0); placed 9th

Week #	Dance/Song	Judges' score			Result
Week #	Dance/Song	Inaba	Goodman	Tonioli	Result
1	Cha-Cha-Cha / "Blow Me (One Last Kiss)"	6.5	6.5	6.5	Safe
2	Quickstep / "Redneck Woman"	6.0	6.0	6.0	Safe
3	Paso Doble / "Living on Video"	7.5	7.5	7.5	Safe
4	Rock n' Roll / "At the Hop"	8.0	8.0/8.0	8.0	Eliminated

- Season 16 with celebrity partner: Aly Raisman (average: 26.71); placed 4th

Week #	Dance/Song	Judges' score			Result
Week #	Dance/Song	Inaba	Goodman	Tonioli	Result
1	Cha-Cha-Cha / "Live While We're Young"	7	7	7	No Elimination
2	Quickstep / "Jumpin Jack"	8	8	8	Safe
3	Viennese Waltz / "Give Me Love"	7	8	8	Safe
4	Contemporary / "Titanium"	9	9	9	Safe
5	Samba / "Misery"	8	8	9	Safe
6	Foxtrot / "Isn't She Lovely"; Team Samba/ "Superstition"	9; 8	9; 9	9; 8	Safe
7	Salsa / "Echa Pa'lla (Manos Pa'rriba)"; Cha-cha-cha Dance-Off / "Brokenhearted"	10; Awarded	9; 3	10; Points	Safe
8 Quarter-finals	Argentine Tango / "Reflejo de Luna"; Jive (Trio Challenge) / "Hit the Road Jack"	9; 9	10; 9	10; 9	Safe
9 Semi-finals	Rumba / "When I Was Your Man"; Afro Jazz / "Azumba"	10; 10	10; 9	10; 10	Safe
10; Finals	Samba / "Hips Don't Lie"; Cha-Cha-Cha Relay / "Treasure"; Freestyle / "Icarus"	9 Awarded; 10	9; 3; 10	10; Points; 10	Eliminated

- Season 17 with celebrity partner: Christina Milian (average: 25.0); placed 9th

Week #	Dance/Song	Judges' score			Result
Week #	Dance/Song	Inaba	Goodman	Tonioli	Result
1	Contemporary / "Clarity"	7	7	7	No Elimination
2	Paso Doble / "Applause"	9	8	9	Safe
3	Charleston / "Let Me Drown"	9	8	9	Last to be called Safe
4	Foxtrot / "Sexy Silk"	8	8^{1}	8	Safe
5	Cha-Cha-Cha / "Forget You"	9	10	9	Eliminated
^{1}Score from guest judge Julianne Hough

- Season 18 with celebrity partner: Candace Cameron Bure (average: 25.47); placed 3rd

Week #	Dance/Song	Judges' score			Result
Week #	Dance/Song	Inaba	Goodman	Tonioli	Result
1	Contemporary / "Burn"	9	8	8	No Elimination
2	Rumba / "Say Something"	7	7	7	Safe
3	Jive / "Blue Suede Shoes"	8	8/8^{1}	8	Safe
4^{2}	Quickstep / "The Ballroom Blitz"	7	7/7^{3}	7	No Elimination
5	Samba / "Under the Sea"	8	9/9^{4}	9	Last to be called safe
6	Cha-Cha-Cha / "I Love It"	8	8^{5} / 8	8	Last to be called safe
7	Argentine Tango / "1977"; Team Freestyle / "Livin' la Vida Loca"	8; 10	9^{6} / 9; 10 / 9	9; 10	Safe
8	Foxtrot / "That's It, I Quit, I'm Movin' On"; Celebrity Dance Duel (Contemporary) / "Stay with Me"	9; 9	9/9^{7} 9/10	9; 10	Safe
9 Semi-finals	Viennese Waltz / "If I Knew"; Jazz / "Nasty"	8; 9	9/9^{8} 10/10	8; 9	Safe
10; Finals	Quickstep / "Umbrella"; Freestyle / "Canned Heat"; Samba & Quickstep Fusion / "Sir Duke"	9; 8; 9	9; 8; 9	9; 8; 9	Third place
^{1}Score from guest judge Robin Roberts^{2}For this week only, as part of the "Partner Switch-Up", Cameron Bure did not perform with Mark Ballas and instead performed with Tony Dovolani.^{3}Score from guest judge Julianne Hough.^{4}Score from guest judge Donny Osmond.^{5}Score from guest judge Redfoo.^{6}Scores from guest judge Ricky Martin.^{7}Score from guest judge Abby Lee Miller.^{8}Score from guest judge Kenny Ortega

- Season 19 with celebrity partner: Sadie Robertson (average: 35.63); placed 2nd

Week #	Dance/Song	Judges' score				Result
Week #	Dance/Song	Inaba	Goodman	Hough	Tonioli	Result
1	Cha-Cha-Cha / "Birthday"	8	8	9	9	Safe
2	Jazz / "She's Country"	8	7	8	8	Safe
3	Viennese Waltz / "Married Life"	8	8^{1}	8	8	Safe
4	Samba / "Hunter"	9	9^{2}	10	9	Safe
5^{3}	Charleston / "Crazy Stupid Love"	9	9^{4}	9	9	No Elimination
6	Rumba / "Diamonds"	9	10^{5}	8	8	Safe
7	Paso Doble / "Come with Me Now"; Team Freestyle / "Time Warp"	7; 8	7; 8	8; 8	8; 8	Safe
8	Contemporary / "Uninvited"; Cha-cha-cha Dance-Off / "Really Don't Care"	9 No	9 Extra	10; Points	10; Awarded	Safe
8	Jive / "1, 2, 3 Turnaround"; Trio Foxtrot / "Can't Take My Eyes Off You"	8; 10	9; 10	8; 10	8; 10	Last to be called safe
10; Semi-finals	Quickstep / "Problem"; Argentine Tango / "Problem" (acoustic version)	9; 9	10; 9	9; 10	9; 9	Last to be called safe
11; Finals	Samba / "Hunter"; Freestyle / "Super Mario Bros. Theme"; Samba & Quickstep Fusion / "Nitty Gritty"	10; 10; 10	9; 10; 10	10; 10; 10	9; 10; 10	Runner-up
^{1} Score given by guest judge Kevin Hart in place of Goodman.^{2}The American public scored the dance in place of Goodman with the averaged score being counted alongside the three other judges.^{3}This week only, for "Partner Switch-Up" week, Robertson performed with Derek Hough instead of Ballas. Ballas performed with Bethany Mota.^{4}Score given by guest judge Jessie J in place of Goodman.^{5}Score given by guest judge Pitbull in place of Goodman.

- Season 20 with celebrity partner Willow Shields (average: 34.0); placed 7th

Week #	Dance/Song	Judges' score				Result
Week #	Dance/Song	Inaba	Goodman	Hough	Tonioli	Result
1	Cha-Cha-Cha / "Lips Are Movin"	6	6	6	6	No elimination
2	Argentine Tango / "Somebody That I Used to Know"	8	8	8	9	Safe
3	Paso Doble / "Hanuman"	8	8	8	8	Safe
4	Contemporary / "Atlas"	10	9	10	10	Safe
5	Foxtrot / "Alice's Theme"	8	8	9	9	Safe
6	Salsa / "Tequila"; Team Freestyle / "Wipe Out"	9; 10	8; 9	8; 10	9; 10	Safe
7	Jazz /"Electric Feel"; Salsa Dance-Off / "Temperature"	9 Awarded	9; 2	9 Extra	10; Points	Eliminated

- Season 21 with celebrity partner Alexa PenaVega (average: 25.75); placed 6th

Week #	Dance/Song	Judges' score			Result
Week #	Dance/Song	Inaba	Hough	Tonioli	Result
1	Jive / "Whistle (While You Work It)"	7	7	8	No Elimination
2	Salsa / "Que Es Lo Que Quiere Esa Nena"; Rumba / "Somewhere in Time Theme"	8; 7	8; 7	8; 8	Safe
3	Jazz / "Breaking Bad Theme"	9	9^{1} / 9	9	Safe
4	Foxtrot / "Mama Said"	7	7	7	Safe
5^{2}	Tango / "Pompeii"	10	10 / 10^{3}	10	No Elimination
6	Cha-Cha-Cha / "I'm a Slave 4 U"	8	7 / 7^{4}	8	Last to be called safe
7	Paso Doble / "Hora Zero"; Team Freestyle / "Ghostbusters"	9; 9	9; 10	9; 9	Last to be called safe
8	Argentine Tango / "Viva la Vida"; Cha-Cha-Cha Dance-Off / "Fun"	9 Awarded	8; 2	8 Points	Safe
9	Contemporary / "Make It Rain"; Team-Up Dance (Charleston) / "All That Jazz" & "Hot Honey Rag"	10; 10	10; 10	10; 10	Eliminated
^{1}Score given by guest judge Alfonso Ribeiro^{2}This week only, for "Partner Switch-Up" week, PenaVega performed with Derek Hough instead of Ballas. Ballas performed with Paula Deen.^{3}Score given by guest judge Maksim Chmerkovskiy^{4}Score given by guest judge Olivia Newton-John

- Season 22 with celebrity partner Paige VanZant (average: 27.13); placed 2nd

Week #	Dance/Song	Judges' score			Result
Week #	Dance/Song	Inaba	Goodman	Tonioli	Result
1	Foxtrot / "Ain't Got Far to Go"	7	7	7	No Elimination
2^{1}	Salsa / "Danza Kuduro"	8	8	8	Safe
3	Paso Doble / "300 Violin Orchestra"	8	7	8	Safe
4	Quickstep / "You've Got a Friend in Me"	9	9/9^{2}	9	Safe
5^{3}	Rumba / "Perfect"	8	8/7^{4}	8	No Elimination
6	Jazz / "Soul Bossa Nova"	9	10	9	Last to be called safe
7	Jive / "Proud Mary"; Team Freestyle / "End of Time", "If I Were a Boy" & "Crazy in Love"	10; 8	10; 8	10; 9	Safe
8	Viennese Waltz / "Stone Cold"; Team-up Dance (Paso Doble) / "Everybody Wants to Rule the World"	10; 9^{5}	9; 10	9; 10	Safe
9 Semi-finals	Trio Samba / "Hip Hip Chin Chin"; Argentine Tango / "One Time"	10; 10	10; 9	10; 10	Last to be called safe
10; Finals	Salsa / "Fireball"; Freestyle / "Over the Rainbow"; Jive & Salsa Fusion / "Little Bitty Pretty One"	10; 10; 10	9; 10; 10	10; 10; 10	Runner-up
^{1} For this week, VanZant performed with troupe member Alan Bersten due to Ballas suffering a back injury during rehearsals.^{2} Score given by guest judge Zendaya.^{3} For this week only, as part of "America's Switch Up", VanZant performed with Sasha Farber instead of Ballas. Ballas performed with Ginger Zee.^{4} Score given by guest judge Maksim Chmerkovskiy.^{5} Due to Inaba being the judge coaching VanZant's team during the team-up dance, the viewers scored the dance in her place with the averaged score being counted alongside the remaining judges.

- Season 25 with celebrity partner Lindsey Stirling (average: 27.06); placed 2nd

Week #	Dance/Song	Judges' score			Result
Week #	Dance/Song	Inaba	Goodman	Tonioli	Result
1	Cha-Cha-Cha / "Don't Worry"	7	8	7	No Elimination
2	Quickstep / "Swing Set"; Salsa / "Mani Picao"	7; 8	7; 8	7; 8	Safe
3	Jive / "Wake Me Up Before You Go-Go"	9	9	9	No Elimination
4	Viennese Waltz / "Anchor"	9	8	9	Safe
5	Foxtrot / "When You Wish Upon a Star"	9	10	9	Safe
6	Argentine Tango / "Human"	10	10/10^{1}	10	Safe
7	Pasodoble / "Roundtable Rival"; Team Freestyle / "Monster Mash"	9; 8	9; 8	9; 8	Safe
8	Samba / "Morning Drums"; Jazz / "Let's Face the Music and Dance"	9; 10	8; 9	9; 9	Safe
9	Contemporary / "Head High"; Tango / "Feel So Close"	10; 9	9; 9	10; 10	Safe
10	Quickstep / "Barfiles at the Beach"; Freestyle / "Palladio"; Jive / "Wake Me Up Before You Go-Go"; Cha-Cha-Cha and Tango Fusion / "Hot2Touch"	10; 10; 10; 10	10/10^{2} 10/10^{2} 10; 10	10; 10; 10; 10	Runner-up
^{1}Score given by guest judge Shania Twain.
^{2}Score given by guest judge Julianne Hough.

- Season 31 with celebrity partner Charli D'Amelio (average: 37.71); placed 1st

Week #	Dance/Song	Judges' score				Result
Week #	Dance/Song	Inaba	Goodman	Hough	Tonioli	Result
1	Cha-Cha-Cha / "Savage (Major Lazer Remix)"	8	8	8	8	Safe
2	Quickstep / "Bossa Nova Baby"	8	8	8	8	Safe
3	Rumba / "No Time to Die"	8	8	8	9	Safe
4	Jazz / "The Simpsons Main Title Theme"	9	9	9	9	Safe
5A	Contemporary / "When the Party's Over"	10	9	10	10	No elimination
5B	Jive / "You Make My Dreams"; Hustle & Lindy Hop Marathon / "Hot Stuff" & "Jump, Jive an' Wail"	9 Awarded	10; 7	9 Extra	10; Points	Safe
6	Foxtrot /"Fever"	10	10	10^{1} / 10	10	Safe
7	Argentine Tango /"Tanguera"; Team Freestyle /"Heads Will Roll"	9; 10	10; 9	10; 10	10; 10	Safe
8	Tango /"Song 2"; Salsa Relay /"Ain't Gonna Hurt Nobody"	10; Awarded	10; 5	10; Extra	10; Points	Safe
9	Viennese Waltz /"Glimpse of Us"; Paso Doble /"España cañí"	10; 10	10; 10	10; 10	10; 10	Safe
10	Jive /"Grown"; Freestyle /"Us Again"	10; 10	10; 10	10; 10	10; 10	Won
^{1}Score given by guest judge Michael Buble.

- Season 34 with celebrity partner Whitney Leavitt (average: 26.88); placed 6th

Week #	Dance/Song	Judges' score			Result
Week #	Dance/Song	Inaba	Hough	Tonioli	Result
1	Tango / "Golden"	—N/a (Note: Whitney and Mark only received two judges's scores, as Carrie Ann Inaba was absent.)	7	8	No Elimination
2	Cha-Cha-Cha / "Play That Funky Music"	7	7	8	Safe
3	Samba / "Shake Ya Ass"	8	8	8	Safe
4	Foxtrot / "The Room Where It Happens"	9	8	8	Safe
5^{2}	Contemporary / "Heal"	9	8 / 8^{1}	8	No Elimination
6	Quickstep / "Popular"	10	9 / 10^{2}	10	Safe
7	Jazz / "Brain Stew"; Hustle & Lindy Hop; Marathon / "Murder on the Dancefloor" — Sophie Ellis-Bextor & "A Little Party Never Killed Nobody (All We Got)" — Fergie, Q-Tip, & GoonRock	9 Awarded	9 / 9^{3} 5 extra	10; Points	Safe
8	Paso doble / "No More Tears"; Freestyle (Team Chicago) / "Celebration"	9; 10	10 / 10^{4} 10 / 10^{4}	10; 10	Safe
9	Argentine tango / "Cell Block Tango" (Dance relay)	10; Immune and	10 / 10^{5} awarded two	10 extra points	Safe
10	Cha-cha-cha / "1999"; Viennese Waltz / "Slow Love"	9; 9	10; 10	10; 10	Eliminated
^{1}Score given by guest judge Kym Johnson^{2}Score given by guest judge Jon M. Chu^{3}Score given by guest judge Cheryl Burke^{4}Score given by guest judge Flavor Flav^{5}Score given by guest judge Tom Bergeron

=== Other Reality TV Appearances ===
Alongside fellow Dancing with the Stars pro Derek Hough, Mark starred in Mark and Derek's Excellent Flip on HGTV in 2015. The show's only season focused on the pair flipping a Southern California house.

In 2025, it was announced Mark Ballas would join the cast of season 4 of The Traitors.

=== Other media ===
Alexander Jean is a duo formation made up of Mark Ballas and his wife BC Jean. They worked as a husband-wife American pop rock duo starting 2015. Their debut single was "Roses and Violets". The single reached the Top 20 on Billboard's Hot 100 "Bubbling Under" chart. They had success with "Waiting for You" and were nominated Elvis Duran's Artist of the Month in November 2018.

== Personal life ==
Ballas began dating singer-songwriter BC Jean in 2012. The couple formed the music duo Alexander Jean in 2015 and became engaged in November of that year. They were married on November 25, 2016, in Malibu, California. Their son was born on November 5, 2023.

== Discography ==
=== Studio albums ===
List of studio albums with album details
Title	Album details
HurtLoveBox	Released: April 12, 2011; Label: Hit Play, RED; Formats: CD, digital download

=== Extended plays ===
List of extended plays with album details
Title	Album details
Kicking Clouds	Released: September 16, 2014; Label: Weed Eater; Formats: Digital download
