= Derek Hough =

American dancer, choreographer, actor, singer (born 1985)

Derek Bruce Hough
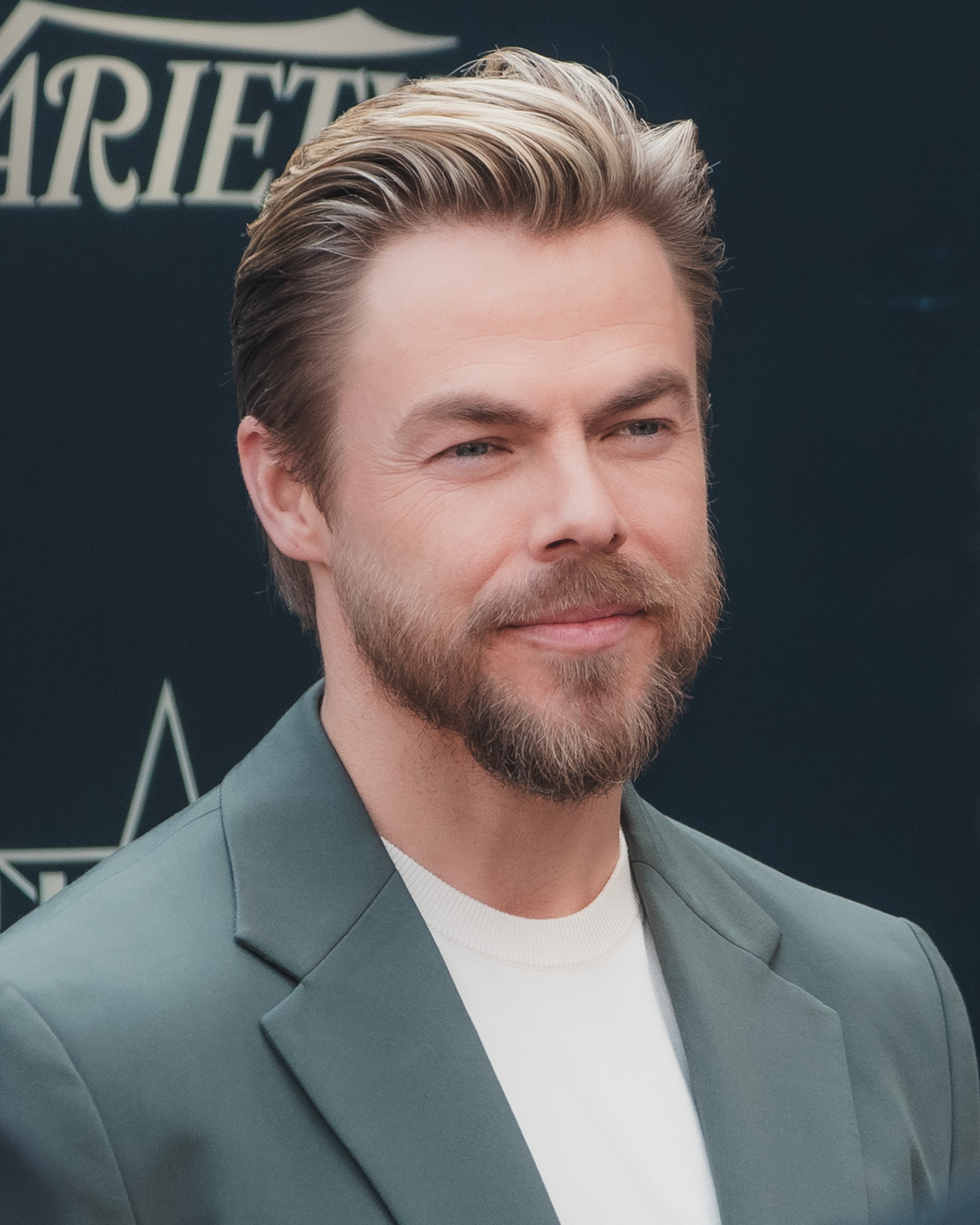
- Hough in 2026
- Born: Derek Grace Hough; May 17, 1985 (age 41); Salt Lake City, Utah, U.S.
- Education: Italia Conti Academy of Theatre Arts
- Occupations: Dancer; choreographer; singer; television personality
- Years active: 2001–present
- Spouse: Hayley Erbert (m. 2023)
- Children: 1
- Relatives: Julianne Hough (sister)
- Awards: Primetime Emmy Award for Outstanding Choreography: Dancing with the Stars (2013, 2015, 2021, 2023)

Derek Bruce Hough (/ˈhʌf/; born May 17, 1985) is an American professional Latin and ballroom dancer, choreographer, singer, and television personality. From 2007 to 2016, Hough was a professional dancer on the ABC dance competition series Dancing with the Stars, winning the show a record-breaking six times with his celebrity partners. For his work, Hough received 14 nominations for the Primetime Emmy Awards for Outstanding Choreography, winning the award 4 times. Hough later became a judge on the series beginning with its 29th season.

From 2017 to 2020, Hough was a judge on the NBC dance competition series World of Dance. Since September 2025, Hough has been hosting Extra beginning with its 32nd season.

== Early life ==
Hough grew up the fourth of five children in a Latter-day Saint family in the Salt Lake City suburb of Sandy, Utah. He is the son of Marianne and Bruce Hough, who was twice chairman of the Utah Republican Party and ran for Utah's 2nd congressional district in 2023, and has four sisters, Sharee, Marabeth, Katherine, and Julianne. All of his grandparents were dancers, and his parents met while on a ballroom dancing team in college in Idaho. He is the second cousin of musicians Riker, Rydel, Rocky, Ryland, and Ross Lynch from the band R5; their maternal grandmothers are sisters.

When Hough was 12, his divorcing parents sent him to London to live and study with dance coaches Corky and Shirley Ballas. Hough's sister Julianne joined him in London several months later. Originally intending to stay for three months, Hough remained in London for ten years (Julianne returned after five years). The Ballases helped tutor the two Hough children alongside their own son, Mark Ballas, schooling them at the Italia Conti Academy of Theatre Arts. They received training in singing, theater, gymnastics and many forms of dance, including jazz, ballet and tap. The three children formed their own pop music trio 2B1G ("2 Boys, 1 Girl") and performed at dance competitions in the UK and the U.S., and showcased UK television shows. Whilst at Italia Conti Academy of Theatre Arts he made his first cameo appearance in the 2001 movie Harry Potter and the Philosopher's Stone. Hough subsequently taught at the Italia Conti Academy of Theatre Arts. As well as being trained in many forms of dance, Hough can also play the piano, guitar, drums and bass.

== Career ==
=== Competitive dancing and choreography ===
Hough won the IDSF World Latin U-21 Championship in 2002, and the Blackpool U-21 Latin title with Aneta Piotrowska in 2003. He has won the LA Outstanding Dancer of the Year and New York Dance Alliance Outstanding Dance awards.

=== Dancing with the Stars ===
Hough made his first appearance on Dancing with the Stars in season four (week 6) as a guest instructor with Julianne and Apolo Anton Ohno. He then joined the cast of professional instructors in season five and was paired with Jennie Garth. Hough and Garth were eliminated in the semi-finals finishing the competition in fourth place. For season six, Hough was paired with actress Shannon Elizabeth. They were eliminated from the show on April 29, 2008, finishing the competition in sixth place. For season seven, Hough was partnered with model/TV host Brooke Burke. In rehearsal on October 4, 2008, Hough tripped and fell, hitting his head on the floor and momentarily blacked out. He was sent to the hospital, but sustained no injuries. Hough and Burke earned the mirror ball trophy and won season seven on November 25, 2008.

For season eight, Hough was paired with rapper Lil' Kim. They were eliminated on May 5, 2009, from the show finishing in fifth place. For season nine, Hough was partnered with model Joanna Krupa. They were eliminated during week nine, the semi-finals, on November 17, 2009, finishing fourth. For season ten, Hough was partnered with Nicole Scherzinger, the lead singer from the singing group The Pussycat Dolls and former member of Eden's Crush. The couple reached the finals and won the competition on May 25, 2010. That was the second win for Hough. For season eleven, Hough won for the third time with actress Jennifer Grey, known for her film roles on Dirty Dancing and Ferris Bueller's Day Off, on November 23, 2010. Hough did not participate in season 12 in order to be a part of the film COBU 3D (later renamed to Make your Move 3D).

For season 13, he was partnered with actress and TV host Ricki Lake, known for playing the original Tracy Turnblad in Hairspray. Lake scored consistently high the whole season and ended up in third place. For season 14, Hough partnered with television personality Maria Menounos. In week seven, the couple earned the first 30 of the season and topped the leader board the first time in the season. The couple made it to the semi-finals but were eliminated after they finished at the top of the leader board. For season 15 (All Stars), Hough was paired with season eight champion, Shawn Johnson. They were runners-up to Melissa Rycroft and Tony Dovolani.

On July 27, 2012, Hough announced that season 15 would be his last. A few months later, on February 22, 2013, Hough announced that he would be back for season 16, stating on his Twitter account, "Wasn't sure if I was able to do this season because of my other projects, but worked it out so I can do both. #pumped.". He was partnered with country singer and former American Idol contestant, Kellie Pickler. On May 21, 2013, Pickler was crowned season 16 champion, marking the fourth time Derek won the Mirror Ball trophy, and made him the only pro to have won four Mirror Balls. On August 2, 2013, Hough confirmed that he would be back for season 17 via an interview with Access Hollywood. The cast for season 17 was announced on September 4, 2013. Hough's partner for season 17 was Glee star Amber Riley. Riley was crowned season 17 champion, historically marking the fifth time Hough has won the Mirror Ball trophy, and made him once again the only pro to have won five Mirror Balls.

For season 18, Hough was paired with paralympic snowboarder, Amy Purdy. In the finale on May 20, 2014, the couple was runner-up for the season, behind Meryl Davis and her partner Maksim Chmerkovskiy. On August 13, 2014, ABC announced that Hough would be back for the season 19 and in September, it was announced that he would be paired with YouTube personality Bethany Mota. The couple made it to the first night of the finals, finishing in fourth place. On February 24, 2015, Hough was announced as one of the returning professional dancers on season 20 despite previously reporting he would not be taking part in this season. He was partnered with gymnast Nastia Liukin. They made it to the semi-finals, but were subsequently eliminated on May 12, finishing in fourth place.

For season 21, he was paired with wildlife conservationist Bindi Irwin. The couple made it to the finals and won the competition on November 24, 2015, marking Hough's sixth win on the show. Hough did not return for Season 22. On August 30, 2016, it was revealed that Hough would once again return as a professional dancer for season 23. He was paired with actress Marilu Henner. They were eliminated on November 7, 2016, finishing in 6th place which is tied for his lowest finish.

On September 8, 2020, it was revealed, after much speculation, that Hough would replace longtime DWTS judge Len Goodman. Due to the travel restrictions between England and the United States during the coronavirus pandemic, Goodman was unable to return for season 29. He returned as a judge for its 30th and 31st seasons and after the retirement and death of Goodman, he was named interim head judge for season 32.

==== Celebrity partners ====
Season	Partner	Place	Average score
5	Jennie Garth	4th	25.67
6	Shannon Elizabeth	6th	24.38
7	Brooke Burke	1st	27.06
8	Lil' Kim	5th	25.82
9	Joanna Krupa	4th	25.46
10	Nicole Scherzinger	1st	27.53
11	Jennifer Grey	1st	27.18
13	Ricki Lake	3rd	26.67
14	Maria Menounos	4th	26.75
15	Shawn Johnson	2nd	27.93
16	Kellie Pickler	1st	27.4
17	Amber Riley	1st	27.75
18	Amy Purdy	2nd	27.87
19	Bethany Mota	4th	27.2
20	Nastia Liukin	4th	27.44
21	Bindi Irwin	1st	27.93
23	Marilu Henner	6th	23.75

==== Performance Record ====
Season 5: celebrity partner Jennie Garth; average: 25.7; placed: 4th

Week #	Dance / Song	Judges' scores			Result
Week #	Dance / Song	Inaba	Goodman	Tonioli	Result
1	Cha-cha-cha / "Uptown Girl"	7	7	7	Safe
2	Quickstep / "Suddenly I See"	7	7	7	Safe
3	Tango / "Cite Tango"	9	8	9	Safe
4	Paso doble / "Because We Can"	8	10	9	Safe
5	Samba / "Cosmic Girl"	8	9	8	Safe
6	Mambo / "Mambo Baby"	9	9	9	Safe
7	Viennese Waltz / "Runaway"; Rumba / "Fallen"	8; 9	8; 9	9; 10	Last to be called safe
8	Jive / "It Takes Two"; Foxtrot / "I've Got You Under My Skin"	8; 9	8; 9	8; 8	Last to be called safe
9 Semifinals	Tango / "The Take Over, The Breaks Over"; Cha-cha-cha / "Mustang Sally"	9; 10	10; 10	9; 10	Eliminated

Season 6: celebrity partner: Shannon Elizabeth; average: 24.4; placed: 6th

Week #	Dance / Song	Judges' scores			Result
Week #	Dance / Song	Inaba	Goodman	Tonioli	Result
1	Cha-cha-cha / "Shut Up and Drive"	7	7	7	No elimination
2	Quickstep / "Swing with Me"	8	8	8	Safe
3	Jive / "Goody Two-Shoes"	8	8	8	Safe
4	Viennese Waltz / "Keep Holding On"	9	10	9	Safe
5	Samba / "Pon de Replay"	8	8	7	Safe
6	Rumba / "True Colors"	8	8	8	Safe
7	Tango / "Tanguedia III"; Mambo / "Ain't Nothing Wrong With That"	9; 8	9; 8	9; 8	Eliminated

Season 7: celebrity partner: Brooke Burke; average: 27.1; placed: 1st

Week #	Dance / Song	Judges' scores			Result
Week #	Dance / Song	Inaba	Goodman	Tonioli	Result
1	Cha-cha-cha / "Are You My Woman (Tell Me So)"	7	8	8	Safe
2	Quickstep / "Lover, Come Back to Me"	9	8	9	Safe
3	Paso doble / "Palladio, First Movement"	8	8	8	Safe
4	Viennese waltz / "Daughters"	9	10	9	Safe
5	Samba / "Hip Hip Chin Chin"	9	8	9	Safe
6	Jitterbug / "Don't Be Cruel"	10	9	10	Safe
7	Rumba / "No Air"	8	10^{1}	8	Safe
8	Foxtrot / "Lullaby of Birdland"; Group Paso doble / "Rocks"	10; 10	10; 9	10; 10	Safe
9	Tango / "Tango Diabolo"; Mambo / "Cuban Mambo"	10; 9	8; 9	10; 9	Safe
10; Semifinals	Jive / "The House is Rockin'"; Salsa / "Barbarabatiri"	7; 9	7; 10	7; 9	Safe
11; Finals	Samba / "Blame It On the Boogie"; Freestyle / "You're the One That I Want"; Viennese waltz / "Daughters"	9; 10; 10	9; 10; 10	10; 10; 10	Won
^{1}Due to Len Goodman's absence in week six the 9 was awarded by stand-in guest judge Michael Flatley

Season 8: celebrity partner: Lil' Kim; average: 25.8; placed: 5th

Week #	Dance / Song	Judges' scores			Result
Week #	Dance / Song	Inaba	Goodman	Tonioli	Result
1	Cha-cha-cha / "Nasty"	7	7	7	No elimination
2	Quickstep / "Diamonds Are a Girl's Best Friend"	8	7	8	Safe
3	Samba / "Remedio P'al Corazon"	8	8	9	Safe
4	Argentine Tango / "Taquito Militar"	9	8	10	Safe
5	Viennese Waltz / "I'll Be"	9	8	9	Safe
6	Jive / "Jailhouse Rock"	10	8	10	Safe
7	Rumba / "Lost Without U"	9	8	9	Safe
8	Paso doble / "El Gato Montes"; Team tango / "Womanizer"	9; 9	9; 9	10; 10	Safe
9	Waltz / "When I Need You"; Salsa / "Por Arriba, Por Abajo"	8; 9	9; 9	8; 9	Eliminated

Season 9: celebrity partner: Joanna Krupa; average: 25.5; placed: 4th

Week #	Dance / Song	Judges' scores			Result
Week #	Dance / Song	Inaba	Goodman	Tonioli	Result
1	Salsa / "Meddle"; Foxtrot / "The Best Is Yet to Come"	8 Awarded	8; 10	8 points	Safe
2	Jive / "What I Like About You"	6	7^{1}	7	Safe
3	Samba / "La Bomba"	7	8	8	Safe
4	Lambada / "Dançando Lambada"	9	8	9	Safe
5^{2}	Argentine Tango / "Whatever Lola Wants"	8	8	8	Safe
6	Waltz / "Be Here To Love Me"; Mambo / "Ran Kan Kan"	8 Awarded	9; 10	9 points	Safe
7	Rumba / "The Look of Love"; Team tango / "You Give Love a Bad Name"	9; 9	9; 9	9; 10	Safe
8	Quickstep / "Valerie"; Paso doble / "Living on Video"	8; 9	7; 10	8; 10	Safe
9 Semifinals	Viennese Waltz / "Hallelujah"; Cha-cha-cha / "Can't Get You Out of My Head"; Salsa / "Lal Luz Del Ritmo"	9; 9; 9	9; 9; 9	9; 9; 9	Eliminated
^{1}Due to Len Goodman's absence in week two the 7 was awarded by stand-in guest judge Baz Luhrmann.^{2}Due to illness, Hough was unfortunately unable to perform that night. Krupa performed this dance and the Group Hustle with stand-in partner Maksim Chmerkovskiy.

Season 10: celebrity partner: Nicole Scherzinger; average: 27.5; placed: 1st

Week #	Dance / Song	Judges' scores			Result
Week #	Dance / Song	Inaba	Goodman	Tonioli	Result
1	Viennese Waltz / "Hold You In My Arms"	9	7	9	No elimination
2	Jive / "SOS"	10	8	10	Safe
3	Quickstep / "Anything Goes"	8	6	9	Safe
4^{1}	Rumba / "The First Time Ever I Saw Your Face"	9; 8	8; 8	8; 9	Safe
5	Tango / "Oh, Pretty Woman"	10	9	10	Safe
6	Samba / "María"; Swing Marathon / "In the Mood"	9 Awarded	7; 10	10 points	Safe
7	Waltz / "You Light Up My Life"; Team GaGa / Cha-cha / "Telephone"	9; 9	9; 9	9; 9	Safe
8	Foxtrot / "Haven't Met You Yet"; Paso doble / "Spanish Guitar"	10; 10	9; 10	10; 10	Safe
9 Semifinals	Argentine tango / "El Capitalismo Foraneo"; Cha-cha-cha / "Kiss"	10; 10	10; 9	10; 10	Safe
10; Finals	Rumba / "The Lady in Red"; Freestyle / "A Little Less Conversation"; Argentine tango / "El Capitalismo Foraneo"; Jive / "Proud Mary"	9; 9; 10; 10	9; 9; 10; 10	10; 9; 10; 10	Won
^{1}This week's dance received two scores from the judges; one for its technical execution and one for the performance.

Season 11: celebrity partner: Jennifer Grey; average: 27.2; placed: 1st

Week #	Dance / Song	Judges' scores			Result
Week #	Dance / Song	Inaba	Goodman	Tonioli	Result
1	Viennese Waltz / "These Arms of Mine"	7	8	8	Safe
2	Jive / "Shake It"	8	8	8	Safe
3	Samba / "A Little Respect"	8	8	8	Safe
4^{1}	Argentine tango / "La Cumparsita"	9; 10	9; 9	9; 10	Safe
5	Foxtrot / "Love and Marriage"	8	8	9	Safe
6	Paso doble / "So What"; Rock 'n' Roll Marathon / "La Grange"	7 Awarded	7; 9	7 points	Safe
7	Tango / "Shut Up"; Team Apollo (Cha-cha-cha) / "Bust A Move"	10^{2}/9; 9	9; 9	9; 9	Safe
8	Quickstep / "Let's Face the Music and Dance"; Rumba / "Waiting for a Girl Like You"	9; 10	9; 10	9; 10	Safe
9 Semifinals	Cha-cha-cha / "Mercy"; Waltz / "Way Over Yonder"	10; 10	10; 10	10; 10	Safe
10; Finals	Paso doble / "Habanera"; Freestyle / "Do You Love Me (Now That I Can Dance)"; Viennese Waltz / "These Arms of Mine"; Instant cha-cha-cha/"Raise Your Glass"	10; 10; 10; 9	10; 10; 10; 9	10; 10; 10; 10	Won
^{1}This week's dance received two scores from the judges; one for its technical execution and one for the performance.^{2}Score from guest judge Drew Lachey. Notes: Hough and Grey hold the most perfect scores in all 16 seasons with six perfect 30s. They won season 11 on November 23, 2010, and this season marked Hough's third win, making him the first pro to win three times.

Season 13: celebrity Partner: Ricki Lake; Average: 26.7; Placed: 3rd

Week #	Dance / Song	Judges' scores			Result
Week #	Dance / Song	Inaba	Goodman	Tonioli	Result
1	Viennese Waltz / "This Year's Love"	7	6	7	Safe
2	Jive / "Hey Ya!"	8	7	8	Safe
3	Rumba / "Gravity"	9	9	9	Safe
4	Tango / "Theme from Psycho"	10	9	10	Safe
5	Foxtrot / "Easy Lover"	8	8	8	Safe
6	Quickstep / "Luck Be a Lady"	10	9	10	Safe
7	Paso doble / "Sweet Dreams"; Team paso doble / "Bring Me to Life"	9; 9	9; 8	9; 9	Safe
8	Waltz / "You Make Me Feel"; Instant Jive / "Land of a Thousand Dances"	9; 8	9; 8	10; 8	Safe
9 Semifinals	Samba / "Jump in the Line"; Argentine tango / "Allerdings"; Cha-cha-cha relay / "I Like How It Feels"	10; 9 Awarded	10; 10; 8	10; 10 points	Safe
10; Finals	Cha-cha-cha / "Yeah 3x" Freestyle / "Can't Touch It"; Tango / Theme from Psycho	9; 9; 10	9; 9; 10	9; 9; 10	Third place

Season 14: celebrity partner: Maria Menounos; average: 26.8; placed: 4th

Week #	Dance / Song	Judges' scores			Result
Week #	Dance / Song	Inaba	Goodman	Tonioli	Result
1	Cha-cha-cha / "Stronger (What Doesn't Kill You)"	7	7	7	No elimination
2	Quickstep / "Sexy Sexy"	8	8	9	Safe
3	Rumba / "Material Girl"	9	9	9	Safe
4	Tango / "School's Out"	9	8	9	Safe
5	Salsa / "The Cup of Life"	9	9	9	Safe
6	Foxtrot / "Jimmy Mack"; Motown Marathon / "Nowhere to Run"	8 Awarded	9; 4	9 points	Safe
7	Paso doble / "Montagues and Capulets"; Team tango / "Toccata"	10; 10	10; 8	10; 9	Safe
8	Viennese Waltz / "A Thousand Years" (Trio Challenge)^{1} Samba / "Mama Do the Hump"	10; 9	8; 7	10; 9	Safe
9 Semifinals	Argentine tango / "La Yumba"; Jive / "Tightrope"	10; 10	10; 9	10; 10	Eliminated
^{1}The dancer Hough and Menounos chose for the Trio Challenge was Henry Byalikov.

Season 15: celebrity partner: Shawn Johnson; average: 27.9; Placed: 2nd

Week #	Dance / Song	Judges' scores			Result
Week #	Dance / Song	Inaba	Goodman	Tonioli	Result
1	Foxtrot / "Good Time"	8	6.5	7.5	Safe
2	Jive / "The Nicest Kids in Town"	8.5	8	8.5	Safe
3	Quickstep / "Hey Pachuco"	9	8	9.5	Safe
4	Mambo / "Paro los Rumberos"	10	9.5	10^{1}/10	Safe
5	Rumba / "My Heart Will Go On"; Group freestyle / "Call Me Maybe"	9; 9.5	8; 10	10; 10	No elimination
6	Cha-cha-cha / "She Thinks My Tractor's Sexy"	9.5	8.5	10	Safe
7^{2}	Tango & Paso doble / "Livin' On A Prayer"; Swing Marathon / "Do Your Thing"	10; Awarded	10; 8	10 points	No elimination
8	Viennese Waltz / "Angel" (Trio Challenge)^{3} Samba / "Jungle Jazz"	10; 10	9.5; 7	10; 9	Safe
9 Semifinals	Bhangra "Knight Rider" / "Mundian to Bach Ke"; Argentine tango / "Bad"	10; 9	10; 10	10; 10	Safe
10; Finals	Quickstep / "Hey Pachuco"; Freestyle / "Carnival de Paris"; Instant Cha-cha-cha / "Respect	9; 10; 10	8.5; 10; 10	9.5; 10; 10	Runner-up
^{1}Score from guest judge Paula Abdul^{2}During Week seven, Mark Ballas danced with Shawn Johnson in place of Hough, due to Hough having an injury in his neck.^{3}The dancer Hough and Johnson chose for the Trio Challenge was Mark Ballas.

Season 16: Celebrity partner: Kellie Pickler; average: 27.4; placed: 1st

Week #	Dance / Song	Judges' scores			Result
Week #	Dance / Song	Inaba	Goodman	Tonioli	Result
1	Cha-cha-cha / "Domino"	7	7	7	No elimination
2	Jazz / "Lights"	9	8	9	Safe
3	Jive / "Footloose"	8	9	8	Safe
4	Rumba / "Say I Do"	9	8	9	Safe
5^{1}	Foxtrot / "It Had to Be You"	9	9	9	Safe
6	Quickstep / "Part-Time Lover"; Team Samba / "Superstition"	9; 8	10; 9	10; 8	Safe
7	Samba / "Shake Your Bon-Bon"	9	10	10	Safe (Immunity)
8	Viennese Waltz / "Fade Into You"; Paso doble (trio challenge)^{2} / "Unstoppable"	9; 10	9; 7	10; 10	Safe
9 Semifinals	Argentine tango / "Para Te"; Flamenco / "The Pirate That Should Not Be"	10; 9	10; 10	10; 9	Safe
10; Finals	Quickstep / "Peppy and George"; Cha-cha-cha relay / "Treasure"; Freestyle / "Beneath Your Beautiful"; Instant jive / "Keep A-Knockin'"	10; Awarded; 10; 10	10; 4; 10; 10	10 points 10; 10	Won
^{1}Hough and Pickler chose Henry Byalikov and Anna Trebunskaya to dance with them on the "Side-By-Side" Challenge.^{2}The dancer Hough and Pickler chose for the Trio Challenge was Tristan MacManus. Note: This season was Derek's fourth win, making him the only pro with four mirrorball trophies.

Season 17: Celebrity partner: Amber Riley; average: 27.8; placed: 1st

Week #	Dance / Song	Judges' scores			Result
Week #	Dance / Song	Inaba	Goodman	Tonioli	Result
1	Cha-cha-cha / "Wings"	9	9	9	No elimination
2	Jive / "Reet Petite"	8	7	8	Safe
3	Charleston / "Bang Bang"	8	8	8	Safe
4	Tango / "Love Lockdown"	9	9^{1}	9	Safe
5	Foxtrot / "Try a Little Tenderness"	9	8	10	Safe
6	Samba / "Get It Right"; Switch-Up Challenge / Various	10; Awarded	8; 4	10 points	No elimination
7	Paso doble / "Diablo Rojo"; Group Freestyle / "The Fox (What Does the Fox Say?)"	10; 10	10; 10	9; 10	Safe
8	Rumba / "If I Could Turn Back Time"	9	9^{2}	10	Safe (Immunity)
9	Quickstep / "That's It!"; Salsa (Trio challenge)^{3} / "Que Viva la Vida"	8; 9	8; 9	8; 9	Safe
10; Semifinals	Jazz / "Locked Out of Heaven"; Viennese Waltz / "Locked Out of Heaven" (acoustic version)	10; 10	10/9^{4} 10/10^{4}	10; 10	Safe
11; Finals	Charleston / "Bang Bang"; Samba relay / "No Scrubs"; Freestyle / "Can You Do This"	10; Awarded; 10	10; 4; 10	10 points 10	Safe
11; Finals	Quickstep & Samba Fusion / "(Your Love Keeps Lifting Me) Higher and Higher"	10	10	10	Won
^{1}In week four, judge Len Goodman was absent and guest judge Julianne Hough filled in for him.^{2}In week eight, judge Len Goodman was absent and guest judge Cher filled in for him.^{3}The dancer Hough and Riley chose for the Trio Challenge is Mark Ballas.^{4}Score from guest judge Maksim Chmerkovskiy. Note: This season was Derek's fifth win, making him the only pro with five mirrorball trophies and the first to have two back-to-back wins.

Season 18: Celebrity partner: Amy Purdy; average: 27.9; placed: 2nd

Week #	Dance / Song	Judges' scores			Result
Week #	Dance / Song	Inaba	Goodman	Tonioli	Result
1	Cha-cha-cha / "Counting Stars"	8	8	8	No elimination
2	Swing / "Swing Set"	8	8	8	Safe
3	Contemporary / "Human"	9	9/9^{1}	9	Safe
4^{2}	Salsa / "Brand New"	9	8/8^{3}	9	No elimination
5	Waltz / "So This Is Love"	9	9/10^{4}	9	Safe
6	Jive / "Shout"	9	10^{5}/9	10	Safe
7	Rumba / "Light My Fire"; Team Loca (Freestyle) / "Livin' la Vida Loca"	9; 10	9^{6}/9; 10^{6}/9	9; 10	Safe
8	Argentine tango / "Heart Upon My Sleeve"; Celebrity Dance Duel (Jive) / "Ain't Nothing Wrong with That"	10; 9	10/10^{7} 10/10	10; 10	Safe
9 Semifinals	Quickstep / "You Can't Hurry Love"; Jazz / "Too Darn Hot"	10; 9	9/10^{8} 10/10	10; 10	Safe
10; Finals	Salsa / "Ran Kan Kan"; Freestyle / "Dare You"; Argentine tango & Cha-cha-cha fusion / "Rather Be"	10; 10; 10	10; 9; 10	10; 10; 10	Runner-up
^{1}Score from guest judge Robin Roberts^{2}For this week only, as part of the "Partner Switch-Up", Purdy did not perform with Derek Hough and instead performed with Mark Ballas.^{3}Score from guest judge Julianne Hough.^{4}Score from guest judge Donny Osmond.^{5}Score from guest judge Redfoo.^{6}Scores from guest judge Ricky Martin.^{7}Score from guest judge Abby Lee Miller.^{8}Score from guest judge Kenny Ortega.

Season 19: Celebrity partner: Bethany Mota average: 36.3; placed: 4th

Week #	Dance / Song	Judges' scores				Result
Week #	Dance / Song	Inaba	Goodman	J. Hough	Tonioli	Result
1	Jive / "Shake It Off"	8	8	8	8	Safe
2	Foxtrot / "All About That Bass"	8	9	8	8	Safe
3	Jazz / "Singin' in the Rain"	10	10^{1}	10	10	Safe
4	Rumba / "Try"	8	9^{2}	8	8	Safe
5^{3}	Hip-Hop / "She Came to Give It to You"	8	8^{4}	8	8	No elimination
6	Tango / "Jealous (I Ain't with It)"	9	9^{5}	9	9	Safe
7	Paso doble / "Run Boy Run"; Team freestyle / "Black Widow"	10; 9	9; 9	10; 9	10; 9	Safe
8	Salsa / "Babalu"; Cha-cha-cha dance-off / "Really Don't Care"	9 Awarded	9; 3	9 extra	10 points	Safe
9	Viennese Waltz / "Say You Love Me"; Trio Argentine tango / "Jungle"	9; 9	9; 10	9; 10	9; 9	Safe
10; Semi-finals	Samba / "I Want You Back"; Contemporary / "I Want You Back" (acoustic version)	9; 10	9; 10	9; 10	9; 10	Safe
11; Finals	Jive / "Shake It Off"; Freestyle / "Revolution (District 78 Remix)"	9; 10	9; 10	9; 10	9; 10	Fourth place
^{1} Score given by guest judge Kevin Hart in place of Goodman.^{2}The American public scored the dance in place of Goodman with the averaged score being counted alongside the three other judges.^{3}This week only, for "Partner Switch-Up" week, Mota performed with Mark Ballas instead of Hough. Hough performed with Sadie Robertson.^{4}Score given by guest judge Jessie J in place of Goodman.^{5}Score given by guest judge Pitbull in place of Goodman.

Season 20: Celebrity partner: Nastia Liukin average: 36.6; placed: 4th

Week #	Dance / Song	Judges' scores				Result
Week #	Dance / Song	Inaba	Goodman	J. Hough	Tonioli	Result
1	Foxtrot / "New York, New York"	8	7	8	8	No Elimination
2	Rumba / "Thinking Out Loud"	8	8	8	9	Safe
3	Samba / "Chillando Goma""	9	8	9	8	Safe
4	Argentine tango / "Variations on Dark Eyes"	9	8	9	10	Safe
5	Jazz / "Love Is an Open Door"	9	9	10	10	Safe
6	Tango / "Summer"; Team freestyle / "Wipe Out"	9; 10	8; 9	8; 10	9; 10	Safe
7^{1}	Charleston / "Honey, I'm Good"	10	9	9	10	Safe (Immunity)
8^{1}	Paso doble / "Centuries"; Trio Jive / "Diane Young"	9; 10	9; 10	9; 10	9; 10	Safe
9^{1} (Semi-finals)	Quickstep / "Feeling Good"; Viennese Waltz / "Fall for You"	10; 10	10; 10	10; 10	10; 10	Eliminated
^{1}Nastia Liukin performed with Sasha Farber as Derek Hough was unable to perform due to an injury. Despite this, Hough choreographed and participated in the dance, but remained limited. For week nine, however, Liukin performed her Quickstep with Farber and her Viennese Waltz with Hough.

Season 21: celebrity partner Bindi Irwin; average: 37.2; placed: 1st

Week #	Dance / Song	Judges' scores				Result
Week #	Dance / Song	Inaba	Goodman	J. Hough	Tonioli	Result
1	Jive / "Crocodile Rock"	8	8	8	8	No elimination
2	Tango / "You Shook Me All Night Long"; Waltz / "Only a Man"	8; 8	8; 8	8; 8	8; 8	Safe
3	Quickstep / "Movin' on Up"	8	8^{1}	8	8	Safe
4	Contemporary / "Every Breath You Take"	9	9	9	10	Safe
5^{2}	Cha-cha-cha / "Hold My Hand"	9	10^{3}	9	9	No elimination
6	Rumba / "(I've Had) The Time of My Life"	10	10^{4}	10	10	Safe
7	Argentine Tango / "Cry Little Sister"; Team Freestyle / "Ghostbusters"	10; 9	10; 9	10; 10	10; 9	Safe
8	Foxtrot / "Grace Kelly"	10	10	9	9	Safe
8	Jive Dance-off / "Travelin' Band"	No	extra	points	awarded	Safe
9	Viennese Waltz / "Roses and Violets"; Team-up dance (Charleston) / "All That Jazz" & "Hot Honey Rag"	10; 10	10; 10	10; 10	10; 10	Safe
10; Semi-finals	Salsa / "You're Never Fully Dressed Without a Smile"; Trio Jazz / "Resolve"	9; 10	9; 10	9; 10	9; 10	No elimination
10; Semi-finals	Samba Dance-off / "Lean On"	3	extra	points	awarded	No elimination
11; Finals	Quickstep / "Dr. Bones"; Freestyle / "Footprints in the Sand"; Argentine Tango & Cha-cha-cha Fusion / "All the Way"	10; 10; 10	10; 10; 10	10; 10; 10	10; 10; 10	Won
^{1} Score given by guest judge Alfonso Ribeiro.^{2} This week only, for "Partner Switch-Up" week, Irwin performed with Valentin Chmerkovskiy instead of Hough. Hough performed with Alexa PenaVega.^{3} Score given by guest judge Maksim Chmerkovskiy.^{4} Score given by guest judge Olivia Newton-John.

Season 23: Celebrity partner: Marilu Henner average: 31.7; placed: 6th

Week #	Dance / Song	Judges' scores				Result
Week #	Dance / Song	Inaba	Goodman	J. Hough	Tonioli	Result
1	Jive / "Can't Stop Dancing"	7	7	7	7	No Elimination
2	Foxtrot / "Angela"	7	7	7	7	Safe
3	Tango / "Battle Cry"	7	7	7	7	Safe
4	Paso Doble / "Battlefield"	7	7	7	7	Safe
5	Viennese Waltz / "Surprise Yourself"	9	9	9	9	No Elimination
6	Cha-cha-cha / "Echa Pa'Lante"	8	9^{1}	9	8	Safe
7	Charleston / "Never Forget You"; Team Freestyle / "Embrace"	7; 8	7; 9	8; 9	7; 9	Safe
8	Argentine Tango / "Sweet Dreams (Are Made of This)"; Cha-cha-cha Dance-Off / "Can't Feel My Face"	7 No	8 Extra	8 Points	8 Awarded	Safe
9	Samba / "December, 1963 (Oh, What a Night)"; Team-up dance (Jazz) / "Big Noise from Winnetka"	9; 9	9^{2} 9^{2}	9; 9	9; 9	Eliminated
^{1} Score given by guest judge Pitbull.^{2} Score given by guest judge Idina Menzel

On September 22, 2013, for the first time, the category for Outstanding Choreography for the Emmy Awards was moved to the Primetime Live Show, and all of the nominees in the category were to create and perform a number with the host of the show, Neil Patrick Harris. Hough, who was nominated for Dancing with the Stars, was part of that number, along with the other nominees. Ken Ehrlich, the executive producer of the show, stated, "It's definitely going to be an original number, something that hasn't been done before. It's going to utilize the talents of all of them to put this number together as choreographers." Hough then went on to win the Emmy Award for Outstanding Choreography. On September 12, 2015, Hough won his second Emmy Award for Outstanding Choreography, alongside Julianne Hough and Tessandra Chavez. This was both Julianne Hough's and Chavez's first Emmy win for outstanding choreography. Including the two nominations that he went on to win, Hough has been nominated for nine Emmy Awards for choreography.

=== Move Live on Tour ===
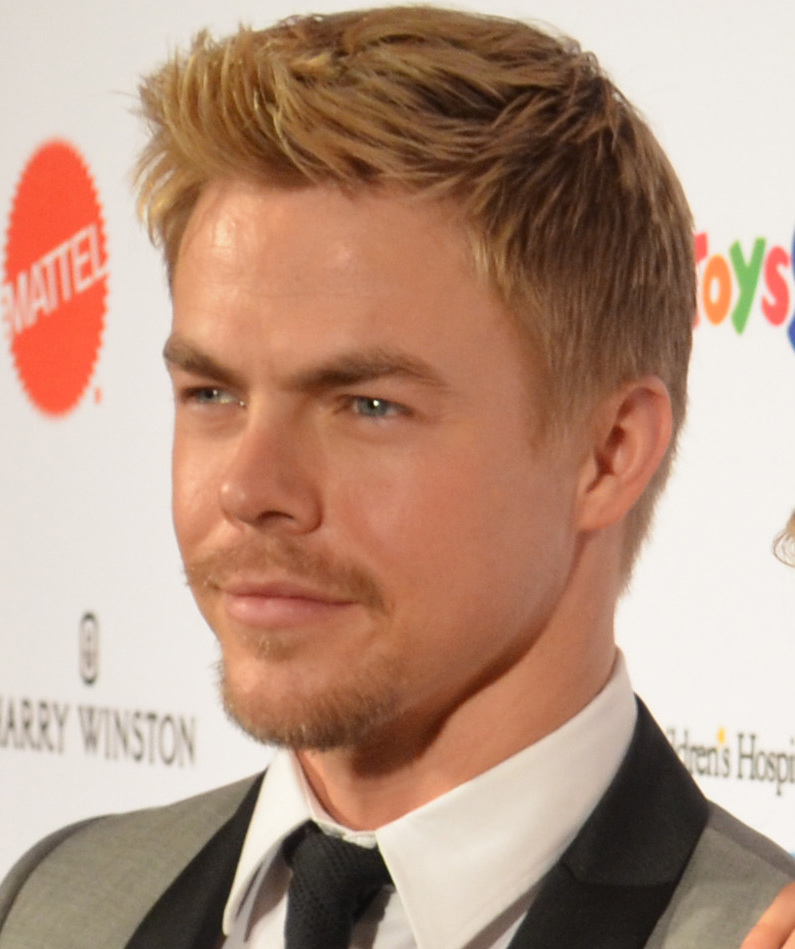
Hough in 2014

In 2014, Hough, along with his sister, Julianne, went on a summer tour starting in Park City, Kansas and ending in Los Angeles. For the tour choreography, the Hough siblings collaborated with Nappytabs.

A reprise was the "Move Live on Tour" in the summer of 2015.

=== Other media ===
In 2011, Hough took one season break from Dancing with the Stars to star in his first movie Make Your Move (original title Cobu 3D) that premiered three years later, on March 31, 2014, in Los Angeles. Hough's first book Taking the Lead: Lessons from a Life in Motion came out on August 5, 2014 and managed to enter The New York Times Best Seller list on August 24, 2014.

In September 2019, Hough hosted an NBC special Return to Downton Abbey: A Grand Event. In September 2020, he signed a wide-ranging deal with ABC Entertainment.

== Personal life ==
Hough married fellow dancer Hayley Erbert on August 26, 2023 in Monterey County, California. They began dating in 2015 after meeting during the Move Live on Tour in 2014. In July 2025, the couple announced they were expecting their first child. On December 29, 2025, Erbert and Hough welcomed a daughter whom they named Everley Capri.

== Filmography ==
=== Television ===
Year	Title	Role	Notes
2007	DanceX	Himself	Panelist; BBC One channel
2007–2016; 2020–present	Dancing with the Stars	Himself	6-time winner; 2-time Emmy winner; Judge (season 29–present)
2011	When I Was 17	Himself	MTV series; season 2, episode 35
2013	Family Dance Off	Host	Special
2015	Mark & Derek's Excellent Flip	Himself	HGTV series; all 4 episodes
2015, 2018	Lip Sync Battle	Himself	Episodes: "Derek Hough vs Julianne Hough", "Shania Twain Tribute"
2016, 2020–22	Disney Parks Magical Christmas Celebration	Himself / Lead co-Host	Special
2017–2020	World of Dance	Judge	NBC Reality dance competition
2017	American Ninja Warrior	Himself	Red Nose Day special
2018	Running Wild with Bear Grylls	Himself	
2019	Holiday with the Houghs	Himself	
2021	Kennedy Center Honors	Himself	Paid tribute to actor Dick Van Dyke, an honoree for the 43rd Kennedy Center Honors TV special event which aired on CBS in June 2021.
2022	Step into the Movies with Derek and Julianne Hough	Himself	
2023	Dick Van Dyke 98 Years of Magic	Himself	
2025	Celebrity Wheel of Fortune	Himself	Contestant
As actor
2011	Better with You	Philip	Episode: "Better with Dancing"
2014–2016	Nashville	Noah West	Recurring role
2016	Jane the Virgin	Salsa Dancer	Episode: "Chapter 40"
2016	Hairspray Live!	Corny Collins	NBC live musical
2021	High School Musical: The Musical: The Series	Zack	Recurring role (Season 2)

== Theater ==
Year	Title	Role	Notes	Ref.
2004	Jesus Christ Superstar	Jesus	Amateur production at Millfield Theatre	
2005	Chitty Chitty Bang Bang	Ensemble	West End debut London Palladium	
2006	Footloose: The Musical	Ren McCormack	UK national tour and West End at Novello Theatre	
2010	Burn the Floor	Replacement Dancer	Longacre Theatre	
2015	New York Spring Spectacular	Jack	Radio City Music Hall; March 26 – May 3	

== Awards and honors ==
Hough is a four-time Emmy winner for Outstanding Choreography and has earned fourteen Emmy Award nominations in total for his work on Dancing with the Stars.

On April 10, 2014, Hough and his sister, Julianne, were honored at Mattel Children's Hospital UCLA's second annual Kaleidoscope Ball with the Kaleidoscope Award, an award that is given to people of the entertainment industry who bring light and laughter into the lives of children through their professional achievements and personal humanitarianism.

On October 17, 2014, GLSEN, during its annual Respect Awards, honored Hough with the year's Inspiration Award.

Association	Year	Category	Nominated work	Result	Ref.
GLSEN	2014	Inspiration Award	Himself	Nominated	
Industry Dance Awards	2015	America's Favorite Choreographer	Himself	Won	
Industry Dance Awards	2015	America's Favorite TV/Film Performance	"Elastic Heart" (with Julianne Hough & Tessandra Chavez)	Won	
Industry Dance Awards	2016	America's Favorite Performance	"Footprints In The Sand" / "Grace Kelly" / "Cry Little Sister"	Nominated	
Industry Dance Awards	2016	Favorite Dance Idol	Himself	Nominated	
Primetime Emmy Awards	2009	Outstanding Choreography	"Great Balls of Fire" (with Julianne Hough)	Nominated	
Primetime Emmy Awards	2010	Outstanding Choreography	"Living on Video" / "Anything Goes"	Nominated	
Primetime Emmy Awards	2010	Outstanding Choreography	"Malagueña" (with Chelsie Hightower)	Nominated	
Primetime Emmy Awards	2013	Outstanding Choreography	"Hey Pachuco" / "Para Los Rumberos" / "Walking on Air"	Won	
Primetime Emmy Awards	2013	Outstanding Choreography	"Stars" / "Heart Cry" (with Allison Holker)	Nominated	
Primetime Emmy Awards	2014	Outstanding Choreography	"Human" / "Too Darn Hot" / "Ameksa"	Nominated	
Primetime Emmy Awards	2015	Outstanding Choreography	"Elastic Heart" (with Julianne Hough & Tessandra Chavez)	Won	
Primetime Emmy Awards	2016	Outstanding Choreography	"Footprints In The Sand" / "Grace Kelly" / "Cry Little Sister"	Nominated	
Primetime Emmy Awards	2017	Outstanding Choreography	"Kairos"	Nominated	
Primetime Emmy Awards	2021	Outstanding Choreography	"Jingle Bells"	Nominated	
Primetime Emmy Awards	2021	Outstanding Choreography	"Paso Doble - Uccen", "Tap Dance - Let's Fall in Love for the Night"	Won	
Primetime Emmy Awards	2022	Outstanding Choreography	"Moulin Rouge - Roxanne" (with Tessandra Chavez)	Nominated	
Primetime Emmy Awards	2023	Outstanding Choreography	"Higher"	Won	
Reality Television Awards	2016	Outstanding Performance	Derek and Amy Purdy	Nominated	
Teen Choice Awards	2015	Choice Dancer	Himself	Nominated	
Teen Choice Awards	2016	Choice Dancer	Himself	Nominated	
Teen Choice Awards	2017	Choice Dancer	Himself	Nominated	
The Dizzy Feet Foundation's Celebration of Dance Gala	2016	Inspiration Award	Derek and Julianne Hough	Nominated	
UCLA	2014	Kaleidoscope Award	Derek and Julianne Hough	Nominated	
World Choreography Awards	2015	Television Live Performance	"MKTO's Classic" (with Christopher Scott); Hough listed as co-choreographer	Won	
World Choreography Awards	2016	Television Reality Show/Competition	"Elastic Heart" (with Julianne Hough & Tessandra Chavez)	Nominated	
World Choreography Awards	2020	Music Video	"A Star Is Born"	Won	
World Choreography Awards	2021	Television Reality Show/Competition	"Paso Doble"	Won	
World Choreography Awards	2022	Television Reality Show/Competition	""Tango of the Dead"	Won	
World Choreography Awards	2023	Television Reality Show/Competition	"Higher"	Won	
World Choreography Awards	2023	Music Video	"Higher"	Won	
World of Dance Industry Awards	2016	Best Choreography on TV	"Elastic Heart" (with Julianne Hough & Tessandra Chavez)	Nominated	
Young Hollywood Awards	2014	Hottest Body	Himself	Won	
Young Hollywood Awards	2014	Best Bromance	Derek and Mark Ballas	Nominated	

=== Dancing with the Stars achievements ===
Awards and achievements
Preceded by Kristi Yamaguchi & Mark Ballas; Donny Osmond & Kym Johnson; Melissa Rycroft & Tony Dovolani; Rumer Willis & Val Chmerkovskiy	Dancing with the Stars (US) winner Season 7 (Fall 2008 with Brooke Burke); Season 10 (Spring 2010 with Nicole Scherzinger); Season 11 (Fall 2010 with Jennifer Grey); Season 16 (Spring 2013 with Kellie Pickler); Season 17 (Fall 2013 with Amber Riley); Season 21 (Fall 2015 with Bindi Irwin)	Succeeded by Shawn Johnson & Mark Ballas; Hines Ward & Kym Johnson; Meryl Davis & Maksim Chmerkovskiy; Nyle DiMarco & Peta Murgatroyd
Preceded by Katherine Jenkins & Mark Ballas; Corbin Bleu & Karina Smirnoff	Dancing with the Stars (US) runner-up Season 15 (Fall 2012 with Shawn Johnson); Season 18 (Spring 2014 with Amy Purdy)	Succeeded by Zendaya & Val Chmerkovskiy; Sadie Robertson & Mark Ballas
Preceded by Chelsea Kane & Mark Ballas	Dancing with the Stars (US) third place contestant Season 13 (Fall 2011 with Ricki Lake)	Succeeded by William Levy & Cheryl Burke
