= Shirley Ballas =

English ballroom dancer (born 1960)

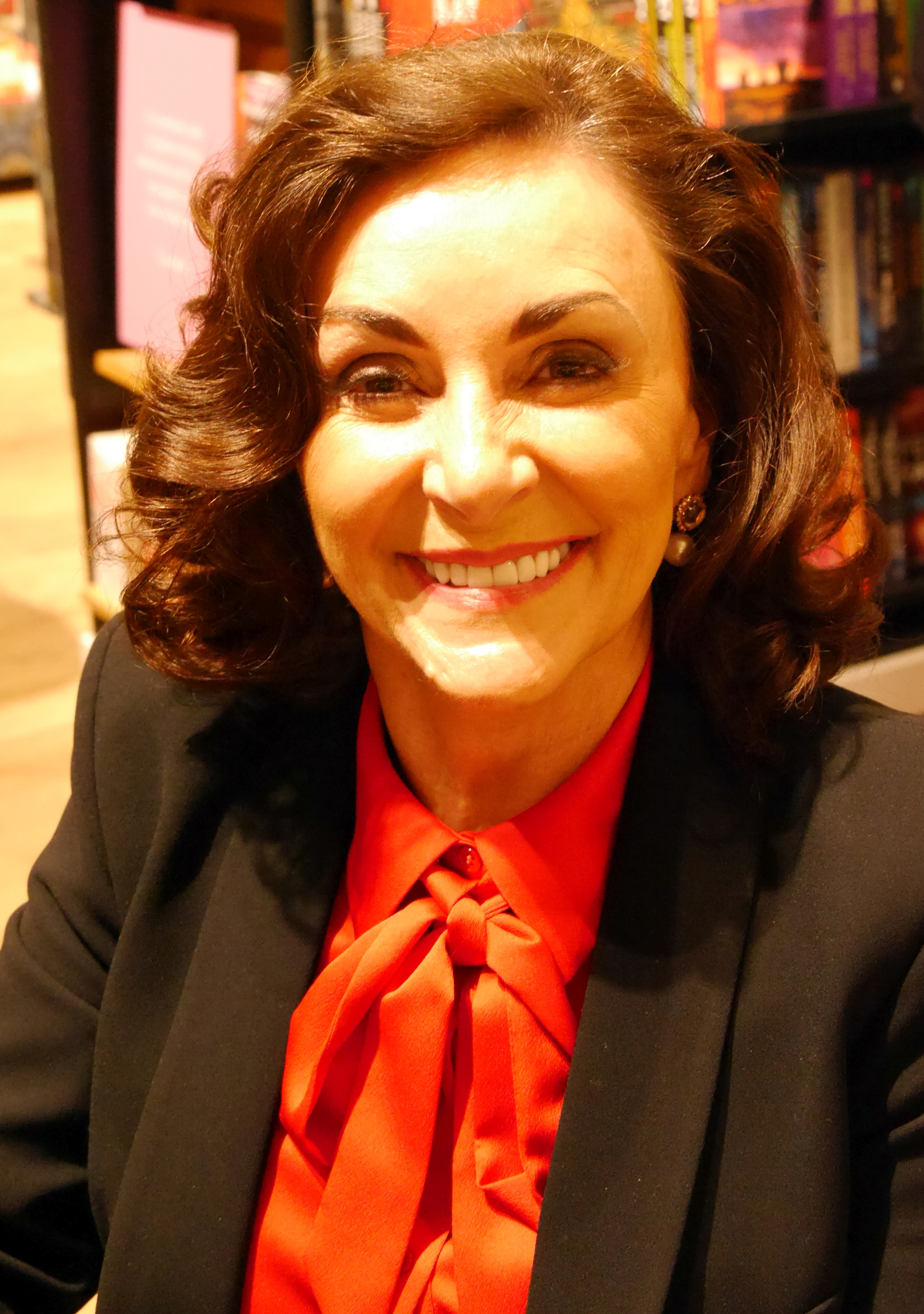
- Ballas at Waterstones, London in 2024
- Born: Shirley Annette Rich; 6 September 1960 (age 66); Wallasey, England
- Occupations: Dancer; television personality
- Spouses: Sammy Stopford (m. 1980; div. 1984) Corky Ballas (m. 1985; div. 2007)
- Children: Mark Ballas

Shirley Annette Ballas (née Rich, formerly Stopford; born 6 September 1960) is an English dancer and television personality. She specialises in the International Latin division, where she won several championship titles which earned her the nickname "the Queen of Latin". Since 2017, Ballas has served as head judge on the BBC One dancing competition show Strictly Come Dancing.

== Early life ==
Ballas was born as Shirley Annette Rich on 6 September 1960 and was raised in Wallasey, Cheshire (now Merseyside), England, with brother David and mother Audrey. The children's father left the family when Shirley was 2 years old. She began dancing at age 7, and began performing competitively the following years. In 2018, Ballas discovered, when appearing on Who Do You Think You Are?, that she was descended from an enslaved Muslim woman from Madagascar. Her paternal great-grandfather was from Cape Town, South Africa.

== Career ==
=== Dancing and marriages ===
At the age of 15, Ballas moved to Shipley, West Yorkshire to live with the family of new partner, British Ballroom Champion, Nigel Tiffany, which she described as "a difficult time". Two years later, she moved with Tiffany to London, where their partnership ended after dance teacher Nina Hunt persuaded her to audition to partner with dancer Sammy Stopford. The two married when Ballas was 18, with the relationship ending five years later. As dance partners, their best result was winning Professional Latin at Blackpool Dance Festival in 1983.

In 1985, she married American ballroom dancer Corky Ballas. Together their best results were winning Professional Latin at Blackpool Dance Festival in 1995 and 1996 The pair moved to Houston, Texas to compete in the US. Their only child, professional ballroom dancer Mark Ballas, was born in 1986. The couple divorced in 2007.

Ballas stopped competing in dance competitions in 1996, becoming a dance coach and judge for ballroom and Latin American competitions.

In December 2023, Ballas was the guest for BBC Radio 4's Desert Island Discs, where her choices included "Smells Like Teen Spirit" by Nirvana, "Moon River" by Frank Sinatra, "Highs and Lows" by Alexander Jean.

=== Television ===
Ballas has appeared on Dancing with the Stars, giving master classes and commentating on the show.

Following a selection process which attracted many candidates, on 9 May 2017, she was officially announced as the replacement for Len Goodman as head judge of Strictly Come Dancing. She made her first appearance on the panel four months later - at the launch show of series 15 on 9 September that year.

In January 2024, Ballas participated in the fifth series of The Masked Singer UK as the character "Rat". She was eliminated and unmasked in the third episode.

== Advocacy ==
Ballas's brother David took his own life, aged 44, in 2003. Ballas was "absolutely devastated" and now works with mental health charity the Campaign Against Living Miserably (CALM). In August 2023, Ballas completed the zip wire challenge at Zip World at Penrhyn Quarry in Gwynedd, and planned a 700 ft wing walk and 15,000 ft skydive, to raise money for the charity.

== Personal life ==
In November 2024, it was reported that Ballas had parted from her fiancé Danny Taylor, after six years together. Ballas revealed that she had "changed her mind" about marriage after going through two divorces.

In February 2025, at Liverpool Crown Court, a 37-year-old man pleaded guilty to a charge of stalking Ballas and causing her "serious harm or distress", between August 2017 and November 2023. It was reported that the man's actions had a "substantial adverse effect" on Ballas's day-to-day life.

== Filmography ==
Year	Title	Role	Notes
2017–present	Strictly Come Dancing	Head judge	Series 15–present
2018	Loose Women	Guest panelist	
2018	Who Do You Think You Are?	Participant	
2019	Our School Summer	Narrator	
2020	The Great British Sewing Bee	Participant	
2020	The Wheel	Celebrity expert	
2021	Taskmaster	Participant	Special - Winner
2021	Saturday Kitchen	Participant	
2024	The Masked Singer UK	Participant	Unmasked as Rat.
2024	Doctor Who	Dancer	1 episode ("The Devil's Chord")
2025	Celebrity Bear Hunt	Herself (contestant)	Series 1
2026	Dancing with the Stars: The Next Pro	Judge	
2026	Dancing with the Stars	Guest Judge	Season 35; week 7

== Books ==
- Behind the Sequins: My Life (BBC Books, October 2020) ISBN 9781785945113
- Murder on the Dance Floor (The Sequin Mysteries #1) (HQ Books, October 2023) ISBN 9780008558000
- Dance to the Death (The Sequin Mysteries #2) (HQ Books, October 2024) ISBN 9780008558079
- Best Foot Forward: Life Lessons from the World of Dance (BBC Books, September 2025) ISBN 9781785949784
