= Dancing with the Stars (American TV series) season 12 =

Dancing with the Stars
- Season 12
- Promotional poster, featuring former pro dancers Cheryl Burke and Dmitry Chaplin
- Hosted by: Tom Bergeron; Brooke Burke
- Judges: Carrie Ann Inaba; Len Goodman; Bruno Tonioli
- Celebrity winner: Hines Ward
- Professional winner: Kym Johnson
- No. of episodes: 19

Release
- Original network: ABC
- Original release: March 21 – May 24, 2011

Season chronology
- ← Previous; Season 11 Next → Season 13

Season twelve of Dancing with the Stars premiered on March 21, 2011, on the ABC network.

Pittsburgh Steelers wide receiver Hines Ward and Kym Johnson were the winners of the competition, while actress Kirstie Alley and Maksim Chmerkovskiy finished second, and Disney star Chelsea Kane and Mark Ballas finished third.

== Cast ==
=== Couples ===
This season featured eleven celebrity contestants. The cast was revealed on February 28, 2011, during The Bachelor, and the professional partners were revealed on March 2. Hip-hop artist Romeo, who had been slated to appear on season 2 before he had to withdraw due to an injury, was one of the contestants to compete this season. This was also the first season to feature a dance troupe, which consisted of six dancers: Oksana Dmytrenko, Tristan MacManus, Peta Murgatroyd, Kiki Nyemchek, Nicole Volynets, and Ted Volynets.

Celebrity	Notability	Professional partner	Status
Mike Catherwood	Radio personality	Lacey Schwimmer	Eliminated 1st on March 29, 2011
Wendy Williams	Talk show host & author	Tony Dovolani	Eliminated 2nd on April 5, 2011
Sugar Ray Leonard	Professional boxer	Anna Trebunskaya	Eliminated 3rd on April 12, 2011
Petra Němcová	Supermodel	Dmitry Chaplin	Eliminated 4th on April 19, 2011
Chris Jericho	Professional wrestler and Musician	Cheryl Burke	Eliminated 5th on April 26, 2011
Kendra Wilkinson	Model & reality television personality	Louis van Amstel	Eliminated 6th on May 3, 2011
Romeo	Rapper & actor	Chelsie Hightower	Eliminated 7th on May 10, 2011
Ralph Macchio	Film actor	Karina Smirnoff	Eliminated 8th on May 17, 2011
Chelsea Kane	Disney Channel actress	Mark Ballas	Third place on May 24, 2011
Kirstie Alley	Film & television actress	Maksim Chmerkovskiy	Runners-up on May 24, 2011
Hines Ward	NFL wide receiver	Kym Johnson	Winners on May 24, 2011

Future appearances

Kirstie Alley returned for the All-Stars season, where she was again paired with Maksim Chmerkovskiy.

=== Host and judges ===
Carrie Ann Inaba, Bruno Tonioli, and Len Goodman returned to the show as judges, while Tom Bergeron and Brooke Burke returned as co-hosts.

== Scoring chart ==
The highest score each week is indicated in bold green with a dagger (†), while the lowest score each week is indicated in italicized red with a double-dagger (‡).

Color key:

Winners
Runners-up
Third place
Eliminated

Dancing with the Stars (season 12) - Weekly scores
Couple	Pl.	Week											
Couple	Pl.	1	2	1+2	3	4	5	6	7	8	9	10	
Couple	Pl.	1	2	1+2	3	4	5	6	7	8	9	Night 1	Night 2
Hines & Kym	1st	21	**23**†	44	**25**†	25	**27**†	27	30+36=**66**†	28+26=54	30+30=60	29+30=**59**†	+30=**89**† (Note: This couple finished in first place.)
Kirstie & Maks	2nd	23	20	43	21	22	23	26	30+30=60‡	28+25=53	27+27=54	27+27=54‡	+30=84‡ (Note: This couple finished in second place.)
Chelsea & Mark	3rd	21	18	39	23	**26**†	26	**28**†	30+34=64	29+26=**55**†	28+30+15=**73**†	29+30=**59**†	+30=**89**† (Note: This couple finished in third place.)
Ralph & Karina	4th	**24**†	21	**45**†	21	25	22‡	24	30+36=**66**†	25+21=46‡	25+23=48‡ (Note: This couple was eliminated.)		
Romeo & Chelsie	5th	19	**23**†	42	20	23	26	**28**†	30+30=60‡	27+25=52			
Kendra & Louis	6th	18	19	37	23	18‡	22‡	25	30+31=61				
Chris & Cheryl	7th	19	**23**†	42	21	23	26	22‡					
Petra & Dmitry	8th	18	18	36	**25**†	23	22‡						
Sugar Ray & Anna	9th	17	17‡	34	20	21							
Wendy & Tony	10th	14	17‡	31	15‡								
Mike & Lacey	11th	13‡	17‡	30‡									

== Weekly scores ==
Individual judges' scores in the charts below (given in parentheses) are listed in this order from left to right: Carrie Ann Inaba, Len Goodman, Bruno Tonioli.

=== Week 1: First Dances ===
The couples danced either the cha-cha-cha or foxtrot. Couples are listed in the order they performed.

Couple	Scores	Dance	Music
Chelsea & Mark	21 (7, 7, 7)	Foxtrot	"King of Anything" — Sara Bareilles
Wendy & Tony	14 (5, 4, 5)	Cha-cha-cha	"I'm Every Woman" — Chaka Khan
Hines & Kym	21 (7, 7, 7)	Cha-cha-cha	"Club Can't Handle Me" — Flo Rida, feat. David Guetta
Petra & Dmitry	18 (6, 6, 6)	Foxtrot	"Don't Know Why" — Norah Jones
Romeo & Chelsie	19 (7, 6, 6)	Cha-cha-cha	"Romeo" — Basement Jaxx
Sugar Ray & Anna	17 (6, 5, 6)	Foxtrot	"The Power of Love" — Huey Lewis & the News
Kendra & Louis	18 (6, 6, 6)	Cha-cha-cha	"When Love Takes Over" — David Guetta, feat. Kelly Rowland
Ralph & Karina	24 (8, 8, 8)	Foxtrot	"Ain't That a Kick in the Head?" — Dean Martin
Chris & Cheryl	19 (7, 6, 6)	Cha-cha-cha	"Should I Stay or Should I Go" — The Clash
Mike & Lacey	13 (5, 4, 4)	Foxtrot	"Cooler Than Me" — Mike Posner
Kirstie & Maks	23 (8, 7, 8)	Cha-cha-cha	"Forget You" — Cee Lo Green

=== Week 2: First Elimination ===
The couples danced either the jive or quickstep. Couples are listed in the order they performed.

Couple	Scores	Dance	Music	Result
Sugar Ray & Anna	17 (6, 5, 6)	Jive	"Sweet Soul Music" — Arthur Conley	Safe
Kendra & Louis	19 (7, 6, 6)	Quickstep	"Gotta Work" — Amerie	Safe
Chelsea & Mark	18 (6, 5, 7)	Jive	"I Write Sins Not Tragedies" — Panic! at the Disco	Safe
Chris & Cheryl	23 (8, 7, 8)	Quickstep	"I Got Rhythm" — Judy Garland	Safe
Petra & Dmitry	18 (6, 6, 6)	Jive	"Crazy Little Thing Called Love" — Queen	Safe
Kirstie & Maks	20 (7, 6, 7)	Quickstep	"Black Horse and the Cherry Tree" — KT Tunstall	Safe
Mike & Lacey	17 (6, 5, 6)	Jive	"The Boys Are Back in Town" — Thin Lizzy	Eliminated
Romeo & Chelsie	23 (7, 8, 8)	Quickstep	"You're the One That I Want" — John Travolta & Olivia Newton-John	Safe
Wendy & Tony	17 (6, 5, 6)	Quickstep	"Do Your Thing" — Basement Jaxx	Safe
Ralph & Karina	21 (7, 7, 7)	Jive	"Nobody But Me" — The Human Beinz	Safe
Hines & Kym	23 (8, 7, 8)	Quickstep	"Part-Time Lover" — Stevie Wonder	Safe

=== Week 3: Personal Story Week ===
The couples performed one unlearned dance. Couples are listed in the order they performed.

Couple	Scores	Dance	Music	Result
Wendy & Tony	15 (5, 5, 5)	Foxtrot	"Last Night a D.J. Saved My Life" — Indeep	Eliminated
Chelsea & Mark	23 (7, 8, 8)	Cha-cha-cha	"Chelsea" — The Summer Set	Safe
Chris & Cheryl	21 (7, 7, 7)	Rumba	"Let It Be" — The Beatles	Safe
Kendra & Louis	23 (8, 7, 8)	Rumba	"You and Me" — Musiq Soulchild	Safe
Romeo & Chelsie	20 (7, 6, 7)	Rumba	"I'll Be There" — The Jackson 5	Safe
Hines & Kym	25 (9, 8, 8)	Samba	"Fantasy" — Earth, Wind and Fire	Safe
Petra & Dmitry	25 (8, 9, 8)	Waltz	"You Raise Me Up" — Josh Groban	Safe
Sugar Ray & Anna	20 (7, 6, 7)	Paso doble	"My Prerogative" — Bobby Brown	Safe
Kirstie & Maks	21 (7, 7, 7)	Rumba	"Over the Rainbow" — Israel Kamakawiwo'ole	Safe
Ralph & Karina	21 (7, 7, 7)	Rumba	"Stay Gold" — Stevie Wonder	Safe

=== Week 4: Classical Week ===
The couples performed one unlearned dance. Couples are listed in the order they performed.

Couple	Scores	Dance	Classical Music	Result
Romeo & Chelsie	23 (7, 8, 8)	Paso doble	"Palladio" — Karl Jenkins	Safe
Kendra & Louis	18 (6, 6, 6)	Viennese waltz	"Con te partirò (Time to Say Goodbye)" — Katherine Jenkins	Safe
Sugar Ray & Anna	21 (7, 7, 7)	Viennese waltz	"Waltz of the Flowers" — Pyotr Ilyich Tchaikovsky	Eliminated
Petra & Dmitry	23 (8, 7, 8)	Paso doble	"March of the Toreadors" — Georges Bizet	Safe
Ralph & Karina	25 (8, 8, 9)	Waltz	"Romeo and Juliet" — Nino Rota	Safe
Hines & Kym	25 (9, 8, 8)	Paso doble	"Explosive / Adagio for Strings" — Bond	Safe
Chelsea & Mark	26 (9, 8, 9)	Viennese waltz	"Hedwig's Theme" — John Williams	Safe
Chris & Cheryl	23 (8, 7, 8)	Paso doble	"I Dovregubbens Hall" — Edvard Grieg	Safe
Kirstie & Maks	22 (7, 7, 8)	Waltz	"The Flower Duet" — Katherine Jenkins	Safe

=== Week 5: American Week ===
The couples performed one unlearned dance. Couples are listed in the order they performed.

Couple	Scores	Dance	Music	Result
Ralph & Karina	22 (8, 7, 7)	Samba	"Sweet Home Alabama" — Lynyrd Skynyrd	Safe
Chris & Cheryl	26 (9, 8, 9)	Viennese waltz	"America the Beautiful" — Whitney Houston	Safe
Petra & Dmitry	22 (7, 7, 8)	Quickstep	"Viva Las Vegas" — Elvis Presley	Eliminated
Romeo & Chelsie	26 (9, 8, 9)	Foxtrot	"New York, New York" — Frank Sinatra	Safe
Hines & Kym	27 (9, 9, 9)	Rumba	"God Bless The USA" — Lee Greenwood	Safe
Kirstie & Maks	23 (8, 7, 8)	Foxtrot	"American Woman" — The Guess Who	Safe
Kendra & Louis	22 (8, 7, 7)	Foxtrot	"Yankee Doodle Dandy(The Yankee Doodle Boy)" — James Cagney	Safe
Chelsea & Mark	26 (9, 8, 9)	Samba	"Party in the U.S.A." — Miley Cyrus	Safe

=== Week 6: Guilty Pleasure Week ===
The couples performed one unlearned dance. Couples are listed in the order they performed.

Couple	Scores	Dance	Music	Result
Kirstie & Maks	26 (8, 9, 9)	Samba	"Baby One More Time" — Britney Spears	Safe
Chris & Cheryl	22 (7, 8, 7)	Tango	"Don't Stop Believin'" — Journey	Eliminated
Romeo & Chelsie	28 (10, 9, 9)	Waltz	"My Heart Will Go On" — Celine Dion	Safe
Chelsea & Mark	28 (10, 9, 9)	Quickstep	"Walking on Sunshine" — Katrina and the Waves	Safe
Kendra & Louis	25 (8, 8, 9)	Samba	"Livin' la Vida Loca" — Ricky Martin	Safe
Hines & Kym	27 (9, 9, 9)	Viennese waltz	"End of the Road" — Boyz II Men	Safe
Ralph & Karina	24 (8, 8, 8)	Paso doble	"Gonna Make You Sweat (Everybody Dance Now)" — C+C Music Factory	Safe

=== Week 7: Ballroom Greats Week ===
Individual judges scores in the chart below (given in parentheses) are listed in this order from left to right: Donnie Burns, Carrie Ann Inaba, Len Goodman, Bruno Tonioli.

The six couples were divided into two teams to perform a cha-cha-cha team dance, and each couple also performed one unlearned dance. Couples are listed in the order they performed.

Couple	Scores	Dance	Music	Result
Chelsea & Mark Ralph & Karina Romeo & Chelsie	30 (8, 8, 7, 7)	Team; Cha-cha-cha	"Born This Way" — Lady Gaga	
Hines & Kym Kendra & Louis Kirstie & Maks	30 (7, 7, 8, 8)	Team; Cha-cha-cha	"We R Who We R" — Ke$ha	
Chelsea & Mark	34 (8, 9, 8, 9)	Paso doble	"Ghosts 'N Stuff" — Deadmau5, feat. Rob Swire	Safe
Kendra & Louis	31 (8, 8, 7, 8)	Tango	"Jalousie" — Billy Fury	Eliminated
Kirstie & Maks	30 (9, 7, 6, 8)	Jive	"La Bamba" — Ritchie Valens	Safe
Ralph & Karina	36 (10, 9, 8, 9)	Quickstep	"Pencil Full Of Lead" — Paolo Nutini	Safe
Hines & Kym	36 (9, 9, 8, 10)	Tango	"Tango Misterioso" — Pedro Gomez	Safe
Romeo & Chelsie	30 (7, 8, 7, 8)	Samba	"Say Hey (I Love You)" — Michael Franti & Spearhead	Safe

=== Week 8: Instant Choreography Week ===
Each couple performed two dances. Couples are listed in the order they performed.

Couple	Scores	Dance	Music	Result
Chelsea & Mark	29 (10, 9, 10)	Waltz	"My Love" — Sia	Safe
Chelsea & Mark	26 (8, 9, 9)	Instant Salsa	"Get Busy" — Sean Paul	Safe
Hines & Kym	28 (9, 9, 10)	Foxtrot	"This Will Be (An Everlasting Love)" — Natalie Cole	Safe
Hines & Kym	26 (9, 9, 8)	Instant Jive	"Chantilly Lace" — Jerry Lee Lewis	Safe
Romeo & Chelsie	27 (9, 9, 9)	Tango	"Hold It Against Me" — Britney Spears	Eliminated
Romeo & Chelsie	25 (8, 9, 8)	Instant Salsa	"Tequila" — Xavier Cugat	Eliminated
Ralph & Karina	25 (8, 8, 9)	Viennese waltz	"Maybe I Maybe You" — Scorpions	Safe
Ralph & Karina	21 (7, 7, 7)	Instant Cha-cha-cha	"Stuck in the Middle With You" — Stealers Wheel	Safe
Kirstie & Maks	28 (9, 9, 10)	Argentine tango	"Cité Tango" — Ástor Piazzolla	Safe
Kirstie & Maks	25 (8, 9, 8)	Instant Salsa	"Cobrastyle" — Teddybears, feat. Mad Cobra	Safe

=== Week 9: Semifinals ===
Each couple performed two unlearned dances, plus competed in a "winner takes all" cha-cha-cha dance relay. Two couples faced off against each other, with the winners from each match competing against each other for fifteen bonus points. Couples are listed in the order they performed.

Couple	Scores	Dance	Music	Result
Ralph & Karina	25 (8, 9, 8)	Argentine tango	"Violentango" — Astor Piazzolla	Eliminated
Ralph & Karina	23 (8, 7, 8)	Salsa	"I Know You Want Me (Calle Ocho)" — Pitbull	Eliminated
Kirstie & Maks	27 (9, 9, 9)	Viennese waltz	"One and Only" — Adele	Safe
Kirstie & Maks	27 (9, 9, 9)	Paso doble	"White Room" — Cream	Safe
Chelsea & Mark	28 (9, 9, 10)	Argentine tango	"Assassin’s Tango" — John Powell	Safe
Chelsea & Mark	30 (10, 10, 10)	Rumba	"Eyes On Fire" — Blue Foundation	Safe
Hines & Kym	30 (10, 10, 10)	Argentine tango	"Perhaps, Perhaps, Perhaps" — Doris Day	Safe
Hines & Kym	30 (10, 10, 10)	Salsa	"Hello" — The Cat Empire	Safe

"Winner Takes All" Cha-cha-cha
Couple	Dance	Music	Result
Hines & Kym	Cha-cha-cha	"Boogie Shoes" — KC and the Sunshine Band	Winners
Ralph & Karina	Cha-cha-cha	"Mustang Sally" — Wilson Pickett	Losers
Chelsea & Mark	Cha-cha-cha	"Makes Me Wonder" — Maroon 5	Winners
Kirstie & Maks	Cha-cha-cha	"Walkin' On The Sun" — Smash Mouth	Losers
Chelsea & Mark	Cha-cha-cha	"Just Dance" — Lady Gaga, feat. Colby O'Donis	Winners
Hines & Kym	Cha-cha-cha	"Just Dance" — Lady Gaga, feat. Colby O'Donis	Losers

=== Week 10: Finals ===
On the first night, the three couples performed two dances: a redemption dance selected by one of the judges, which was a style they had already performed earlier in the competition, and their freestyle routine. On the second night, each couple performed their favorite dance. Couples are listed in the order they performed.

Night 1

Couple	Judge	Scores	Dance	Music
Chelsea & Mark	Carrie Ann Inaba	29 (10, 9, 10)	Samba	"Hip Hip Chin Chin" — Club des Belugas
Chelsea & Mark	Carrie Ann Inaba	30 (10, 10, 10)	Freestyle	"Latinos" — Proyecto Uno
Kirstie & Maks	Bruno Tonioli	27 (9, 9, 9)	Samba	"Magalenha" — Sérgio Mendes, feat. Carlinhos Brown
Kirstie & Maks	Bruno Tonioli	27 (9, 9, 9)	Freestyle	"Perfect" — Pink
Hines & Kym	Len Goodman	29 (10, 9, 10)	Quickstep	"Puttin' On The Ritz" — Irving Berlin
Hines & Kym	Len Goodman	30 (10, 10, 10)	Freestyle	"Dancing Machine" & "I Want You Back" — The Jackson 5

Night 2

Couple	Scores	Dance	Music	Result
Chelsea & Mark	30 (10, 10, 10)	Viennese waltz	"Hedwig's Theme" — John Williams	Third place
Kirstie & Maks	30 (10, 10, 10)	Cha-cha-cha	"Forget You" — Cee Lo Green	Runners-up
Hines & Kym	30 (10, 10, 10)	Samba	"Fantasy" — Earth, Wind, and Fire	Winners

== Dance chart ==
The couples performed the following each week:

- Week 1: One unlearned dance (cha-cha-cha or foxtrot)
- Week 2: One unlearned dance (jive or quickstep)
- Week 3: One unlearned dance
- Week 4: One unlearned dance
- Week 5: One unlearned dance
- Week 6: One unlearned dance
- Week 7: One unlearned dance & team dance
- Week 8: One unlearned dance & instant dance
- Week 9 (Semifinals): Two unlearned dances & cha-cha-cha dance-off
- Week 10 (Finals, Night 1): Judge's choice dance & freestyle
- Week 10 (Finals, Night 2): Favorite dance of the season

Dancing with the Stars (season 12) - Dance chart
Couple	Week															
Couple	1	2	3	4	5	6	7		8		9			10		
Couple	1	2	3	4	5	6	7		8		9			Night 1		Night 2
Hines & Kym	Cha-cha-cha	Quickstep	Samba	Paso doble	Rumba	Viennese waltz	Team; Cha-cha-cha	Tango	Foxtrot	Jive	Argentine tango	Salsa	Cha-cha-cha; Dance-off	Quickstep	Freestyle	Samba
Kirstie & Maks	Cha-cha-cha	Quickstep	Rumba	Waltz	Foxtrot	Samba	Team; Cha-cha-cha	Jive	Argentine tango	Salsa	Viennese waltz	Paso doble	Cha-cha-cha; Dance-off	Samba	Freestyle	Cha-cha-cha
Chelsea & Mark	Foxtrot	Jive	Cha-cha-cha	Viennese waltz	Samba	Quickstep	Team; Cha-cha-cha	Paso doble	Waltz	Salsa	Argentine tango	Rumba	Cha-cha-cha; Dance-off	Samba	Freestyle	Viennese waltz
Ralph & Karina	Foxtrot	Jive	Rumba	Waltz	Samba	Paso doble	Team; Cha-cha-cha	Quickstep	Viennese waltz	Cha-cha-cha	Argentine tango	Salsa	Cha-cha-cha; Dance-off			
Romeo & Chelsie	Cha-cha-cha	Quickstep	Rumba	Paso doble	Foxtrot	Waltz	Team; Cha-cha-cha	Samba	Tango	Salsa						
Kendra & Louis	Cha-cha-cha	Quickstep	Rumba	Viennese waltz	Foxtrot	Samba	Team; Cha-cha-cha	Tango								
Chris & Cheryl	Cha-cha-cha	Quickstep	Rumba	Paso doble	Viennese waltz	Tango										
Petra & Dmitry	Foxtrot	Jive	Waltz	Paso doble	Quickstep											
Sugar Ray & Anna	Foxtrot	Jive	Paso doble	Viennese waltz												
Wendy & Tony	Cha-cha-cha	Quickstep	Foxtrot													
Mike & Lacey	Foxtrot	Jive														

== Ratings ==
Dancing with the Stars tied with Modern Family, a sitcom which also airs on ABC, for the season's No. 5 spot in the age 18–49 demographic of viewers, and placed at No. 3 on the rankings of the overall season.
