= Chelsea Kane =

American actress and singer (born 1988)

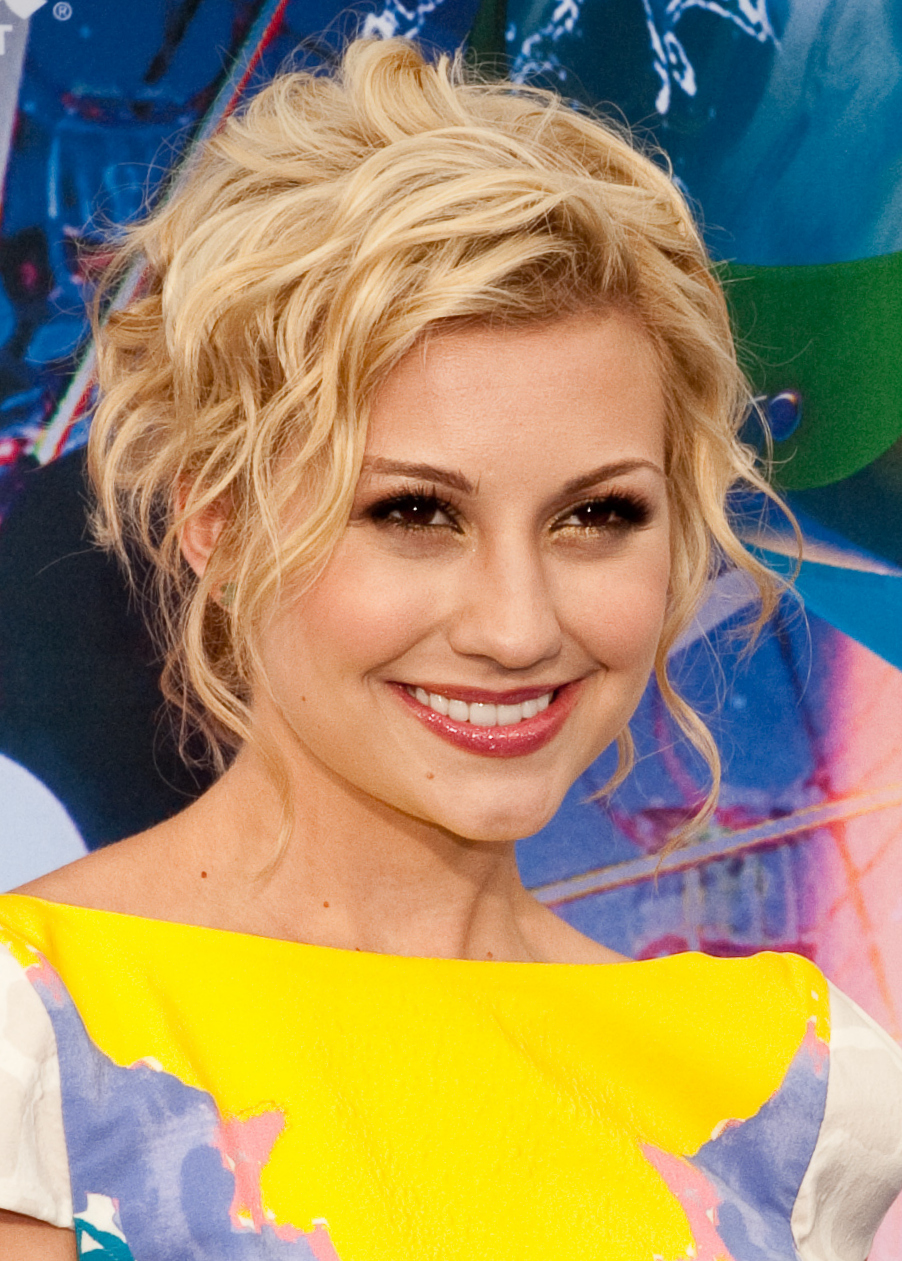
- Kane at the World of Color premiere at the Disney California Adventure Park in June 2010
- Born: Chelsea Kane Staub; September 15, 1988 (age 37); Phoenix, Arizona, U.S.
- Occupations: Actress, singer
- Years active: 2001–present
- Spouse: Miguel Marques (m. 2025)
- Children: 1
- Website: chelseakane.com

Chelsea Kane Staub (born September 15, 1988) is an American actress and singer. She is best known for her role as Stella Malone in the Disney Channel sitcom television series Jonas and the role of Riley Perrin in the Freeform sitcom, Baby Daddy. She also voiced Bea Goldfishberg in the Disney Channel animated sitcom Fish Hooks.

== Early life ==
Chelsea Kane Staub was born in Phoenix, Arizona on September 15, 1988. Kane is the only child of John and Becky Staub. She worked at Valley Youth Theatre.

== Career ==
Kane made her professional acting debut in the 2001 short film Failure of Pamela Salt. She went on to guest star in the television series Cracking Up, Listen Up, the pilot episode of Summerland, and the 2004 direct-to-video film Arizona Summer.

In 2007, Kane starred in her first theatrical film role as Meredith Baxter Dimly, in the film Bratz, playing the film's antagonist. She also performed two of the songs on the film's soundtrack.

In 2008, she starred in Minutemen as Stephanie Jameson. She also appeared in one episode of Wizards of Waverly Place (the episode, "The Supernatural") and she starred in the Disney Channel original film Starstruck (2010). She played the role of Stella Malone, the stylist and longtime best friend of the band J.O.N.A.S., in the Disney Channel series Jonas. The series aired from 2009 to 2010. From 2010 to 2014, Kane co-starred in the Disney Channel animated series Fish Hooks, voicing the role of Bea Goldfishberg.

In 2010, Kane filmed a web series called "The Homes" written and directed by John Cabrera. The series premiered on January 27, 2011, on Lockerz.com. Kane was one of the celebrity contestants in season 12 on the American ballroom competition Dancing with the Stars. Her professional partner was Mark Ballas, a two-time champion of the series. She made it to the season finale, but finished in third place behind Hines Ward and Kirstie Alley.

In 2011, Kane joined the cast of the final season of The CW's One Tree Hill in a recurring role. She played a character named Tara, who is a love interest for Kane's real life ex-boyfriend Stephen Colletti's character, Chase. From 2012 to 2017, Kane co-starred as Riley Perrin in the Freeform sitcom Baby Daddy.

== Personal life ==
In 2009, Kane was in a relationship with musician Brian Logan Dales, lead vocalist of the band The Summer Set. Their song "Chelsea" was written about her.

In July 2025, Kane announced her marriage to Miguel Marques. Kane quietly gave birth to their son, Alonzo Lua, later that same year.

== Filmography ==
=== Film ===
Year	Title	Role	Notes
2004	Arizona Summer	Carol	Direct-to-video film
2007	Bratz	Meredith Baxter Dimly	First theatrical role
2008	Minutemen	Stephanie Jameson	Disney Channel original film
2010	Starstruck	Alexis Bender	Disney Channel original film
2013	Lovestruck: The Musical	Harper Hutton/Debbie Hayworth	ABC Family original film
2014	Pop Fan	Ava Pierce	Main role; Lifetime original film

=== Television ===
Year	Title	Role	Notes
2004	Listen Up	Young girl	Episode: "Grandmaster of the Wolfhunt"
2004	Summerland	Sharon	Pilot episode
2004	Cracking Up	Nora Jones	Episodes: "Grudge Match", "Learning Disability"
2008	Wizards of Waverly Place	Kari Langsdorf	Episode: "The Supernatural"
2008	The Bill Engvall Show	Erica	Episode: "Pineblock Derby"
2008	Disney Channel Games	Herself	5 episodes
2008	Jonas Brothers: Living the Dream	Herself	Episode: "Hello Hollywood"
2009–2010	Jonas	Stella Malone	Main role; Disney Channel original series
2010–2014	Fish Hooks	Bea Goldfishberg (voice)	Main role; Disney Channel original series
2011	Dancing with the Stars	Herself/contestant	Season 12; placed third
2011	So Random!	Herself	Episode: "Chelsea Kane Staub and Hot Chelle Rae"
2011	The Homes	Annie Holmes	Main role; web series
2012	One Tree Hill	Tara Richards	Recurring role, 5 episodes
2012	CSI: Crime Scene Investigation	Brooke Casidy	Episode: "Trends with Benefits"
2012	Drop Dead Diva	Paige McBride	Episode: "Jane's Getting Married"
2012–2017	Baby Daddy	Riley Perrin	Main role; ABC Family original series
2015	Rick and Morty	Arthricia (voice)	Episode: "Look Who's Purging Now"
2015–2016	Regular Show	Chrissy, various voices (voice)	2 episodes
2018–2019	Hot Streets	Jen Sanders (voice)	Main role
2018	A Christmas for the Books	Joanna Moret	Hallmark Movies & Mysteries Channel Television Film
2018	Trolls: The Beat Goes On!	Pow (voice)	Episode: "Party Crashed"
2019–2021	Archibald's Next Big Thing	Loy (voice)	Main role
2019	Robot Chicken	Butterbear, Ellen Ripley (voice)	Episode: "Musya Shakhtyorov in: Honeyboogers"
2020	The Expanding Universe of Ashley Garcia	Ava Germaine	Recurring role, 4 episodes
2020	DC Super Hero Girls	Rose Wilson (voice)	Episode: "Dinner for Five"
2022–2026	9-1-1	Kameron Riley	Season 6: 4 episodes; Season 9: 1 episode

=== Music videos ===
Year	Title	Artist	Notes
2009	"U Can't Touch This"	Daniel Curtis Lee and Adam Hicks	Cameo appearance
2009	"Chelsea"	The Summer Set	Herself
2011	"Hotwire"	Mark Ballas	Herself

=== Video games ===
Year	Title	Role	Notes
2024	Batman: Arkham Shadow	Barbara Gordon	Voiceover role

== Discography ==
Year	Song	Album
2007	"It's All About Me" (feat. Malese Jow and Anneliese van der Pol)	Bratz: Motion Picture Soundtrack
2007	"Fabulous"	Bratz: Motion Picture Soundtrack
2011	"When Everything Falls Back Down" (with Action Item)	The Stronger The Love

== Awards and nominations ==
Year	Association	Category	Nominated work	Result
2009	Teen Choice Awards	Choice TV Breakout Star Female	Jonas L.A.	Nominated
2012	Teen Choice Awards	Summer TV Star: Female	Baby Daddy	Nominated
2013	Teen Choice Awards	Summer TV Star: Female	Baby Daddy	Nominated

== Dancing with the Stars performances ==
Chelsea Kane's partner was Mark Ballas.

Week #	Dance / Song	Judges' score			Result
Week #	Dance / Song	Inaba	Goodman	Tonioli	Result
1	Foxtrot / "King of Anything"	7	7	7	No elimination
2	Jive / "I Write Sins Not Tragedies"	6	5	7	Safe
3	Cha-cha-cha/ "Chelsea"	7	8	8	Safe
4	Viennese Waltz/ "Hedwig's Theme"	9	8	9	Safe
5	Samba / "Party in the U.S.A."	9	8	9	Safe
6	Quickstep / "Walking on Sunshine"	10	9	9	Safe
7	Cha-cha-cha / "Born This Way"; Paso Doble / "Ghosts 'n' Stuff"	8*/8; 8*/9	7; 8	7; 9	Safe
8	Waltz /"My Love"; Salsa / "Get Busy"	10; 8	9; 9	10; 9	Safe
9	Argentine Tango / "Assassin's Tango"; Rumba / "Eyes On Fire"; Cha-cha-cha / "Just Dance"	9; 10; Awarded	9; 10; 15	10; 10 points	Safe
10	Judge's Pick Samba / "Hip Hip Chin Chin"; Freestyle / "Latinos"; Viennese Waltz / "Hedwig's Theme"	10; 10; 10	9; 10; 10	10; 10; 10	Third place

- In week 7, Donnie Burns was the guest judge and scored the dances.
- On the finale, Chelsea Kane received third place despite tying for the top of the leaderboard, topping the leaderboard for 6 other dances throughout the season, and having the second highest average in the season.
