= Color (disambiguation) =

Color or colour is the visual perceptual property corresponding in humans to the categories called red, yellow, blue, green, etc.

Color(s), The Color(s), Colour(s) and The Colour(s) may also refer to:

== Science ==
- Color charge, in particle physics, a property of quarks and gluons
- Color index, in astronomy, a simple numerical expression that determines the color of an object
- Color temperature, the temperature of a radiating black body corresponding to a given color of light
- Color vision, the ability of an organism or machine to distinguish objects based on light wavelength
- Colorimetry, the mathematical science of the measurement and perception of color
- Colors of noise, the descriptions of noises based on the shape of their spectral densities
- Dye, a colored substance that has an affinity to the substrate to which it is being applied
  - Food coloring, any substance added to food to change its color
- Pigment, solid colored particles, used in paints
  - Biological pigment, colored substances in living organisms
- Primary color, a color belonging to a set of three that can be combined to make a gamut of colors

== Arts, entertainment, and media ==
=== Films ===
- Colors (1988 film), starring Sean Penn and Robert Duvall
- Colours (2009 film), an Indian Malayalam film

=== Games ===
- Colors (video game), a cancelled video game for the Gizmondo GPS console
- Colours (solitaire), a card game
- Colors!, a Nintendo DS homebrew program
- Sonic Colors, a 2010 video game for the Wii

=== Literature ===
- The Colour (novel), 2003, by Rose Tremain
- Color, a 1925 poetry collection by Countee Cullen

=== Theater ===
- The Colours (play), 2019, by Harriet Madeley

=== Music ===
==== Groups ====
- Color (band), a Japanese punk band
- Colour, a defunct British math pop band formerly signed to Big Scary Monsters Recording Company
- The Colour, a defunct American band whose guitarist now fronts the band The Romany Rye
- The Color (band), Canadian Christian music group

==== Albums ====
===== Color(s) =====
- Color (NEWS album), 2008
- Color (Katie Gately album), 2016
- Colors (Beck album), 2017
- Colors (Between the Buried and Me album), 2007
- Colors (CNBLUE album), 2015
- Colors (Laleh album), 2013
- Colors (Ken Nordine album), 1966
- Colors (Kyuhyun album), 2024
- Colors (House of Heroes album), 2016
- Colors (Rina Aiuchi album), 2010
- Colors (mixtape), 2022, by YoungBoy Never Broke Again
- Color (EP), by Kwon Eun-bi, 2022
- Colors (EP), by Miss A, 2015
- The Color (album), by Yellowbirds, 2011
- Colors, by Mari Hamada, 1990
- Colors, by Raul de Souza, 1974
- Color, EP by Girugamesh, 1974

===== Colour(s) =====
- Colour (Andy Hunter album), 2008
- Colour (The Christians album), 1990
- Colours (Adam F album), 1997
- Colours (Ayumi Hamasaki album), 2014
- Colours (Baccara album), 1979
- Colours (Christopher album), 2012
- Colours (1972 Donovan album)
- Colours (1987 Donovan album)
- Colours (1991 Donovan album)
- Colours (Eloy album), 1980
- Colours (Graffiti6 album), 2010
- Colours (Mark Norman album), 2007
- Colours (Michael Learns to Rock album), 1993
- Colours (Nadia Oh album), 2011
- Colours (Resurrection Band album), 1980
- Colours (Stone album), 1990
- Colours (EP), by Solar, 2024
- Colours, 1999, by The Ten Tenors
- Colours, a 2014 EP by PartyNextDoor
- Colours, a 2019 EP by Pixey

==== Songs ====
===== Color(s) =====
- "Colors" (Broiler song), 2013
- "Colors" (Flow song), 2006
- "Colors" (Halsey song), 2016
- "Colors" (Hikaru Utada song), 2003
- "Colors" (Ice-T song), 1988
- "Colors" (Jason Derulo song), 2018
- "Colors" (Morandi song), 2009
- "Color", 2010, by The Maine from Black & White
- "Color", 2016, by Todrick Hall from Straight Outta Oz
- "Color", 2017, by Carly Pearce from Every Little Thing
- "Colors", 1990, by Iced Earth from Iced Earth
- "Colors", 2004, by Crossfade from Crossfade
- "Colors", 2007, by The Rocket Summer from Do You Feel
- "Colors (Into Nothing)", 2012, by Code Orange from Love Is Love/Return to Dust
- "Colors", 2015, by Hardwell from United We Are
- "Colors", 2016, by Eric Saade from Saade
- "Colors", 2016, by OneRepublic from Oh My My
- "Colors", 2016, by Stella Jang from the EP of the same name
- "Colors", 2017, by Beck from Colors
- "Colors", 2017, by Day6 from Moonrise (Day6 album)
- "Colors", 2018, by Iz*One from Color*Iz
- "Colors", 2019, by Black Pumas from Black Pumas
- "Colors", 2019, by Loona from X X
- "Colors", 2021, by Lauren Jauregui
- "Colors", 2022, by Gryffin from Alive

===== Colour(s) =====
- "Colours" (Donovan song), 1965
- "Colours" (Grouplove song), 2011
- "Colour", 1998, by Seal from Human Being
- "Colours", 2013, by Age of Consent from The Music of Grand Theft Auto V
- "Colours", 2007, by Calvin Harris from I Created Disco
- "Colours", 2006, by Hot Chip from The Warning
- "Colours", 1989, by Phil Collins from ...But Seriously
- "Colours", 2012, by The Chevin from Borderland
- "Colours", 2009, by The Prodigy from Invaders Must Die
- "Colours", 1989, by The Sisters of Mercy from Floodland
- "Colours", 2019, by Keiino
- "Colours", 2019, by Pixey

==== Other uses in music ====
- Tone color, or timbre
- Color, in medieval music theory, a sequence of repeated notes in the cantus firmus tenor of a composition, in isorhythm
- Coloration, in medieval music theory, a technique of marking notes, in mensural notation

=== Television shows and episodes ===
- "Color", an episode of the Adult Swim television series Off the Air
- "Colours", an episode of the TV series Pocoyo

=== Visual art ===
- Color analysis (art), a process of determining the colors that best suit an individual's natural coloring
- Color code, a system for displaying information by using different colors
- Color photography
- Color theory, the art of color mixing and the visual impact of color combinations
- Color wheel or color circle, a logical arrangement of colors around a circle for artistic or scientific purposes
- Color, in typography, the overall density and balance between white space and print in a page layout

=== Television channels and stations ===
- Colors TV, an Indian television channel
- Color Visión, a Dominican television network
- Colours (TV channel), a defunct Philippine satellite television channel
- Telecolor, a defunct Cuban television station

=== Other uses in arts, entertainment, and media ===
- Color (manga), a 1999 Japanese manga
- Color commentary, or color, in a sporting event broadcast, supplemental information offered between play-by-play calls
- Colors (magazine), a multilingual quarterly magazine
- COLORS, or ColorsxStudios, a German live performance media company and YouTube channel

== Computing and technology ==
- Color (software), a color-grading application for Apple's Final Cut Studio video production suite
- Color Labs, a former social photo and video broadcasting smartphone application, also known as color.com

== Finance and law ==
- Color of law, a legal term meaning "pretense or appearance of" some right
- Color, also known as gamma decay, the derivative of gamma with respect to time

== Insignia and groups ==
- Colors (motorcycling), club insignia
- Military colours, flags of a regiment, battalion, etc.
- Gang colors, colors or insignia worn by gang members
- Political colour, colors associated with a political party or ideology
- Sporting colours, a form of recognition for sporting prowess at a university; known in many places as a Blue
- Color Health, a population health company that provides genetic tests
- Colors (symbolic), representative of institutions

== Skin color, ethnicity, or race ==
- Colored, a potentially offensive term used in the U.S. to refer to people of certain ethnicities
- Coloureds, a term in Southern Africa for people of mixed ethnic origin
- Human skin color, human skin pigmentation
- Person of color, a term used primarily in the U.S. for a person who is not white
- Race (human categorization), as defined when conflated with skin color

== Other ==
- Colors (restaurant), in New York City
- R-colored vowel, vowels with ⟨r⟩-like acoustic quality

== See also ==
- The Color (disambiguation)
- Animal coloration
- Colorful (disambiguation)
- Coloring (disambiguation)
- In Color (disambiguation)
- Coulours, a commune in the Yonne department in Bourgogne-Franche-Comté in north-central France
- List of colors
