= Color code (disambiguation) =

Color code or color coding may refer to:

- Color code, standardized mappings from systems of colors to meanings, as in traffic lights
- Color coding technology for visualization, methods of choosing meanings for colors in information visualization
- Color-coding, a technique for speeding up pattern matching algorithms by randomly assigning colors to objects
- Color-code (band), a Japanese all-female music group
- Colour Coding, an Australian indie pop band
- Color Code Personality Profile, a classification of people's motivations into four types associated with four colors
- Color-coding, formally called Unified Vehicular Volume Reduction Program, a system restricting when cars can drive in Metro Manila
- Gender color-coding, the stereotyped association of color with gender in some cultures
- Electronic color code, the color code used to identify electronic parts
- Web colors, defined with a hexadecimal triplet code

== See also ==
- Coloring (disambiguation)
- Blue code
- Code Red (disambiguation)
- Gold code
- Gray code
