= In Color =

In Color or In Colour may refer to:

- In Color (Cheap Trick album), 1977
- "In Color" (song), a song by Jamey Johnson
- In Colour (The Concretes album), 2006
- In Colour (Jamie xx album), 2015
- ...In Color, a 2008 EP by The Summer Set

== See also ==
- Color photography
- Film colorization
- Color television
- Color (disambiguation)
