= Colorful (disambiguation) =

Colorful refers to the quality of possessing prominent and varied colors.

Colorful or Colourful may also refer to:

== Film ==
- Colorful (2000 film), a Japanese supernatural fantasy drama film
- Colourful, an Indian Malayalam-language film of 2006
- Colorful (2010 film), a Japanese animated film by Keiichi Hara
- Rangeela (1995 film) (lit. Colourful), an Indian film by Ram Gopal Varma

== Music ==
- "Colorful" (9nine song), 2013
- "Colorful" (ClariS song), 2013
- "Colorful" (Jun Shibata song), 2007
- "Colourful", a song by the Parlotones from Radiocontrolledrobot, 2005
- "Colorful", a song by Rocco DeLuca and the Burden from I Trust You to Kill Me, 2006
- "Colorful", a song by the Verve Pipe from Underneath, 2001
- Colourful Records, a Japanese record label

== Other uses ==
- Colorful (manga), a 1998–2000 manga by Torajirō Kishi and an adapted 1999 anime series
- Colorful, a 1998 children's novel by Eto Mori, basis for the 2010 film
- Colourful Radio, a commercial radio station in London

== See also ==
- Colorfulness, a concept referring to the perceived intensity of a specific color
- Color (disambiguation)
