= Everything's Fine (The Summer Set album) =

Studio album by The Summer Set
- Released: July 19, 2011
- Genre: Emo pop; pop; pop punk; pop rock; power pop; reggae pop
- Length: 38:07
- Label: Razor & Tie
- Producer: John Fields

The Summer Set chronology
| Love Like This (2009) | Everything's Fine (2011) | Legendary (2013) |

Professional ratings
Review scores
| Source | Rating |
|---|---|
| AbsolutePunk | 8.1/10 |
| AllMusic | 3/5 stars |
| Consequence of Sound | D |
| PopMatters | 6/10 stars |
| Sputnikmusic | 2.5/5 |
| theMusic | Favorable |

Everything's Fine is the second studio album by American rock band The Summer Set. Released on July 19, 2011, the album charted at number 65 on the Billboard 200. In October and November 2012, the band went on The Rockshow at the End of the World Tour in the US, alongside All Time Low, the Downtown Fiction and Hit the Lights.

== Track listing ==
1. "About a Girl" – 3:54
2. "When We Were Young" – 3:47
3. "Someone Like You" – 3:22
4. "Back to the Start" – 3:51
5. "Must Be the Music" – 3:17
6. "Thick as Thieves" – 3:05
7. "Mannequin" – 3:40
8. "Mona Lisa" – 2:32
9. "Begin Again" – 3:16
10. "Love to You" – 3:02
11. "Don't Let Me Go" – 4:16

Japanese bonus track

1. "Let the Walls Come Down" – 3:58

== Charts ==
Chart performance for Everything's Fine
| Chart (2011) | Peak position |
|---|---|
| US Billboard 200 | 65 |
| US Independent Albums (Billboard) | 10 |
| US Top Alternative Albums (Billboard) | 14 |
| US Top Rock Albums (Billboard) | 17 |
