= Legendary (The Summer Set album) =

Studio album by The Summer Set
- Released: April 16, 2013
- Recorded: 2013
- Genre: Emo pop; pop; pop rock
- Length: 44:41
- Label: Fearless
- Producer: Dan Book; Alexei Misoul; Mighty Mike; Ian Kirkpatrick; Emily Wright; Andrew Dawson; Matt Rad; Will McCoy

The Summer Set chronology
Everything's Fine (2011)	Legendary (2013)	Stories for Monday (2016)

Singles from Legendary
- 1. "Boomerang" Released: March 12, 2013

Professional ratings
Review scores
Source	Rating
AbsolutePunk	9/10 stars
AllMusic	2/5 stars
Alternative Press	3.5/5 stars
idobi	4/5 stars

Legendary is the third studio album by pop rock band The Summer Set.

In February 2013, the band supported All Time Low on their tour of the UK. In February and March, the band went on a headlining US tour, dubbed Wake Up & Be Awesome Tour, with support from We Are the In Crowd, Go Radio, For the Foxes and Paradise Fears. Legendary was released on April 16, 2013. In June 2015, the group supported Sleeping with Sirens on their acoustic tour, dubbed the We Like It Quiet Tour.

== Chart performance ==
The album peaked at number 53 on the US Billboard 200 chart and reached number 12 on the Billboard Independent Albums chart.

== Track listing ==
No.	Title	Length
1.	"Maybe Tonight"	3:34
2.	"Jukebox (Life Goes On)"	3:44
3.	"Boomerang"	3:31
4.	"Lightning in a Bottle"	4:07
5.	"Heart on the Floor" (featuring Dia Frampton)	3:50
6.	"Fuck U Over"	3:44
7.	"Happy for You"	3:44
8.	"The Way We Were"	3:06
9.	"7 Days"	3:48
10.	"Someday"	3:23
11.	"Rescue"	3:25
12.	"Legendary"	5:09
Total length:		44:41

Deluxe edition bonus tracks
No.	Title	Length
13.	"One Night"	4:17
14.	"Welcome to the World"	3:27
15.	"Slip Away"	3:51
16.	"Accidental Billionaires"	3:38
17.	"Lightning in a Bottle" (alternate version)	4:06
Total length:		64:00

== Charts ==
Chart performance for Legendary
Chart (2013)	Peak position
UK Albums (OCC)	145
US Billboard 200	53
US Independent Albums (Billboard)	12
