= Redcode =

Redcode may refer to:

- The programming language used in the simulation game Core War
- REDCODE, a video codec used in RED Digital Cinema cameras

== See also ==
- Code Red (disambiguation)
