= The Summer Set =

American rock band

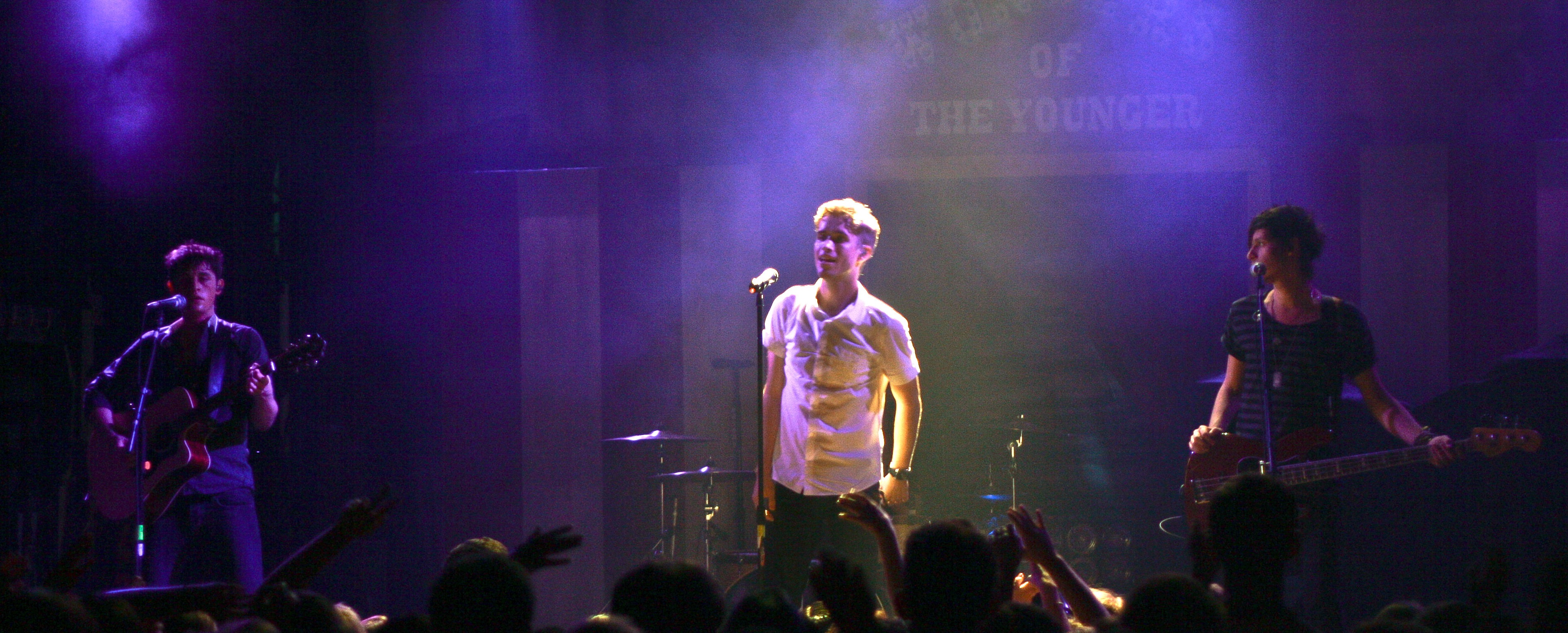
- The Summer Set in 2011

Background information
- Origin: Scottsdale, Arizona, U.S.
- Genres: Pop rock; pop-punk; pop; alternative rock; emo pop; neon pop-punk (early)
- Years active: 2007–2017; 2021–present; (hiatus: 2017–2021)
- Labels: The Militia Group; Razor & Tie; Fearless; LAB
- Spinoff of: Last Call For Camden
- Members: Brian Logan Dales; Jess Bowen; Stephen Gomez; John Gomez
- Past members: Dillon Morris; Josh Montgomery
- Website: thesummerset.com

The Summer Set is an American pop rock band from Scottsdale, Arizona. The band consists of lead vocalist Brian Logan Dales, guitarist John Gomez, bass guitarist Stephen Gomez, and drummer Jess Bowen. The Summer Set was signed to The Militia Group in 2008, Razor & Tie from 2009 to 2011, and to Fearless Records from 2012 to 2017. The Summer Set has released four full-length studio albums: Love Like This (2009), Everything's Fine (2011), Legendary (2013), Stories for Monday (2016), and Meet Me at the Record Store (2025). The band toured with numerous musical acts, including the Cab, We Are the In Crowd, Mayday Parade, Sleeping with Sirens, All Time Low, the Downtown Fiction, and Action Item. The band was on hiatus from October 2017 to August 2021.

The Summer Set's musical style has been regarded as pop rock, pop-punk, alternative rock, emo pop, pop music, synth-pop heavy, and power pop.

== History ==
=== Early years ===
Prior to the formation of the Summer Set, Jess Bowen and brothers Stephen and John Gomez played in a band called Last Call for Camden, along with Kennedy Brock of The Maine and Weston Michl. Last Call for Camden released one album, Keep Your Feet On the Ground, before disbanding.

The Summer Set was formed in 2007, when John Gomez, Stephen Gomez, Jess Bowen, and Brian Logan Dales began writing and performing music. Josh Montgomery joined the band as a guitarist in 2008. The Summer Set self-released their first EP, Love the Love You Have, in November 2007. In April 2008, the band signed its first record deal with The Militia Group. The band recorded and released their EP …In Color on June 24, 2008. In November 2008, The Summer Set recorded a pop punk cover of Usher's hit song " Love in This Club".

In December 2008, the band released their third EP, Meet Me on the Left Coast, which featured two new tracks and a cover of "Love in This Club" as an iTunes bonus track. The band also appeared on the Punk Goes Classic Rock album released on April 27, 2010, by Fearless Records, covering "Rock and Roll All Nite" by Kiss.

On the April 5, 2011, episode of Dancing with the Stars, actress Chelsea Kane and partner Mark Ballas danced a Cha-Cha-Cha set to the Summer Set's "Chelsea". In a behind-the-scenes package shown prior to the dance, Kane revealed that the song was written for her by Brian Logan Dales, who she had been dating at that time.

=== Love Like This ===
The Summer Set's debut full-length album, Love Like This, was released on October 13, 2009.

On July 6, 2010, the Summer Set released an expanded version of their debut album, Love Like This, titled Love Like Swift, which featured five live Taylor Swift cover songs (recorded at The Hoodwink at the 2010 Bamboozle Festival).

=== Everything's Fine ===
Everything's Fine is the Summer Set's second full-length album, released on July 19, 2011, through Razor & Tie.

The group wrote with Paul Doucette of Matchbox Twenty and Mike Daly of Whiskeytown in Nashville. They recorded the album with producer John Fields. "He pushed us hard and he brought so much out of us", said Brian Logan Dales. "We had some early demos that sounded like our last record, but when we were done, everything sounded so new and different".

Everything's Fine presented a departure from the Summer Set's previous sound, featuring slower tempos and solemn themes. "The title is a bit sarcastic", said Stephen Gomez of the record.

On May 6, 2011, the band launched a crowd-sourced lyric video for "Someone Like You". The video featured live recordings of the band taken by fans during the Dirty Work Tour with All Time Low.

=== Legendary ===
Over the summer of 2012, members of the Summer Set rented a house together in Tempe, Arizona, where they wrote songs for their upcoming full-length album Legendary. The band stated that living communally that summer inspired the lyrical content of their third album, and sparked the fun-loving energy of the album cycle that ensued.

The Summer Set released Legendary on April 16, 2013, through Fearless Records. The lead single "Boomerang" was released in March of that year. The music video for the second single "Lightning in a Bottle" was released on April 8, 2014.

In late 2013, the Summer Set took part in the Macy's iHeartRadio Rising Star competition. After the contest's six million online votes were tallied, the Summer Set was announced 2013's Rising Stars. As the winners, the band performed at the iHeartRadio Music Festival, as well as Macy's Glamorama events with Sheryl Crow and the Backstreet Boys. On November 28, 2013, the Summer Set took part in the Macy's Thanksgiving Day Parade. Their performance of "Lightning in a Bottle" was featured on the television broadcast.

=== Stories for Monday ===
The Summer Set's fourth studio album, Stories for Monday, was released on April 1, 2016. Singles from the album include "Figure Me Out", "Missin' You", and "Jean Jacket", which were all released prior to the album's release date. The Summer Set released a music video for the song "Wasted" on April 1, 2016.

On April 4, 2016, the Summer Set played at a Bernie Sanders rally in Milwaukee, Wisconsin, along with 3OH!3.

=== Hiatus ===
In early 2017, Brian Logan Dales announced that he had been working on a separate project called DALES with producer and guitarist Matt Beckley since 2014. On April 30, 2017, DALES released its first single "Young for the Summer". DALES released additional singles throughout 2017. Since then, Brian Logan Dales has appeared multiple times for surprise DJ sets at Emo Nite in Los Angeles.

On October 17, 2017, the Summer Set announced on Twitter that they were going on an indefinite hiatus. Brian Logan Dales confirmed the announcement in separate posts on his private Tumblr and Twitter accounts.

=== Return and Blossom ===
On August 23, 2021, the band announced via Instagram that they were reuniting, minus former member Josh Montgomery. They released a new single on August 27, 2021, called "Street Lightning". They released another single on December 3, 2021, titled "Back Together". They released the third single on June 16, 2022, called "Teenagers" featuring Chrissy Costanza of Against the Current. The following day, June 17, 2022, the band announced that they would be putting out a two-part album called Blossom, the first part of which was set to be released on September 9, 2022. The fourth single off the album was released on August 12, 2022, called "Hard Candy". They released the final single, called "FTS" featuring Travie McCoy, on September 2, 2022, a week before the album's release date. The album was officially released worldwide on September 9, 2022.

=== Meet Me at the Record Store ===
In early 2025, the band began teasing new music and a new upcoming album release via their Instagram. On April 11, 2025, they announced their sixth studio album, Meet Me at the Record Store, would release on August 15, 2025. The album's first and lead single, "ADIDAS", released the same day. The album's second single, "What I'm Made Of", released on May 16, 2025.

== Tours ==
In 2009, the Summer Set played at Alternative Press's AP Tour, touring with bands such as the Cab, Never Shout Never, Hey Monday, and Every Avenue. Following the AP Tour, the Summer Set toured with Cartel.

In 2010, the band went on to play several festivals including The Bamboozle festival and the Vans Warped Tour.

In 2011, the Summer Set participated in the free OurZone Magazine Tour, which took place over seven dates in the United Kingdom in May 2011. The band was also part of the Dirty Work Tour, which included All Time Low, Yellowcard, and Hey Monday. The Dirty Work Tour ran from March to May in 2011, covering most of the United States.

In 2013, the Summer Set performed on the Vans Warped Tour 2013 on the Kia Forte Stage and Tilly's Stage.

In 2014, the Summer Set toured in the United Kingdom with Paradise Fears and William Beckett on a string of dates after touring with We Are the In Crowd, Sleeping with Sirens, and Mayday Parade in Europe. The Summer Set also completed an acoustic tour for Legendary in the United States. The band also participated in the Vans Warped Tour for the second year in a row.

In 2015, the Summer Set traveled across the United States, performing twelve acoustic shows on the "We like It Quiet Tour".

The Summer Set played shows throughout the United States and United Kingdom from April to June in 2016 on the Stories for Monday Tour. The Stories for Monday tour opened with Handsome Ghost, Karizma, and Royal Teeth. That summer, the Summer Set played the final two weeks of the Vans Warped Tour. In August 2016, the band announced the Made for You Tour, where fans were allowed to select cities in which the shows would be played. During the Made for You Tour, the band performed shows across the United States throughout October and early November 2016.

Following their return, the band played at Chain Fest 2021, as well as some intimate shows in December. They then played a headliner show at the 8123 Fest in Phoenix, Arizona, as well as the main show.

The Summer Set toured in the United Kingdom in June 2022, after which they performed at Sad Summer Fest. The band performed a show celebrating 15 years of the Summer Set and their new album on November 3, 2022, in Los Angeles.

== Members ==
Current line-up

- Brian Logan Dales – lead vocals (2007–present)
- Jess Bowen – drums (2007–present)
- John Gomez – lead guitar, piano, backing vocals (2007–present)
- Stephen Gomez – bass guitar (2007–present)

Past members

- Dillon Morris – rhythm guitar (2007)
- Josh Montgomery – rhythm guitar (2008–2017)

== Discography ==
=== Studio albums ===
List of studio albums, with selected chart positions
Title	Album details	Peak chart positions				
Title	Album details	US	US Rock	US Alt	US Indie	UK
Love Like This	Released: October 13, 2009; Label: Razor & Tie; Format: CD, DL, LP	173	—	—	28	—
Everything's Fine	Released: July 19, 2011; Label: Razor & Tie; Format: CD, DL, LP	65	17	14	10	—
Legendary	Released: April 16, 2013; Label: Fearless; Format: CD, DL, LP	53	—	—	12	145
Stories for Monday	Released: April 1, 2016; Label: Fearless; Format: CD, DL, LP	84	12	8	8	—
Blossom	Released: September 9, 2022; Label: Self-released; Format: DL, LP	—	—	—	—	—
Meet Me at the Record Store	Released: August 15, 2025; Label: LAB; Format: CD, DL, LP	—	—	—	—	—
"_" denotes a release that did not chart.

=== Extended plays ===
- Love the Love You Have (self-released, November 30, 2007)
- ...In Color (The Militia Group, June 24, 2008)
- Meet Me on the Left Coast (The Militia Group, December 12, 2008)
- What Money Can't Buy (self-released, November 28, 2011)

=== Singles ===
List of singles as lead artist, with selected chart positions
Title	Year	Peak chart positions				Sales	Album
Title	Year	US	US Rock Digital	JPN	UK	Sales	Album
"Chelsea"	2009	—	—	38	—		Love Like This
"About a Girl"	2011	—	—	—	—		Everything's Fine
"Someone Like You"	2011	—	—	—	—		Everything's Fine
"Mannequin"	2012	—	—	—	—		Everything's Fine
"When We Were Young"	2012	—	—	—	—		Everything's Fine
"Fuck U Over"	2012	—	—	—	—		Legendary
"Maybe Tonight"	2013	—	—	—	—		Legendary
"Boomerang"	2013	—	—	—	—	US: 10,000	Legendary
"Lightning in a Bottle"	2014	—	—	—	—		Legendary
"Figure Me Out"	2016	—	31	—	—		Stories for Monday
"Street Lightning"	2021	—	—	—	—		Blossom
"Back Together"	2021	—	—	—	—		Blossom
"Teenagers" (featuring Chrissy Costanza of Against the Current)	2022	—	—	—	—		Blossom
"Hard Candy"	2022	—	—	—	—		Blossom
"FTS" (featuring Travie McCoy)	2022	—	—	—	—		Blossom
"ADIDAS"	2025	—	—	—	—		Meet Me at the Record Store
"What I'm Made Of"	2025	—	—	—	—		Meet Me at the Record Store
"—" denotes a recording that did not chart or was not released in that territory.
