= Colors! =

Series of digital painting applications

Colors!; Colors! 3D; Colors Live; Colors Live 2
- Original author: Jens Andersson
- Developer: Collecting Smiles
- Release: 2007
- Platform: Colors!: Nintendo DS, PlayStation Vita, Android, iOS; Colors! 3D: Nintendo 3DS; Colors Live: Nintendo Switch
- Type: Raster graphics editor
- Website: colorslive.com

Colors! is a series of digital painting applications for handheld game consoles and mobile devices. Originally created as a homebrew application for Nintendo DS (as Colors!), which was since officially distributed on PlayStation Vita, Android, and iOS, the project eventually evolved into an officially licensed application for Nintendo 3DS (as Colors! 3D), Nintendo Switch (as Colors Live) and Nintendo Switch 2 (as Colors Live 2).

== History ==
=== Colors! ===
Colors! was originally released in June 2007 as a simple homebrew painting application for the Nintendo DS. It was developed by Jens Andersson, a programmer and designer on sabbatical from the games industry who wanted to experiment with the potential of the new handheld platform. Shortly after, Rafał Piasek created an online gallery where users could upload paintings made with the program.

Colors! quickly became one of the best-known homebrew applications on the Nintendo DS, and in September 2008, it was also released for the iPhone and iPod Touch. As of August 2010, it had been downloaded almost half a million times. It was voted the most popular homebrew application on the Nintendo DS by readers of the R4 for DS blog.

Development of Colors! DS homebrew officially ended in December 2010 although the official gallery still accepted submissions from DS users until 2020 when Colors! Gallery was discontinued.

=== Colors! 3D ===
Colors! 3D is a successor to the application Colors! for the Nintendo 3DS. It was released as an officially licensed application for the Nintendo eShop in North America on April 5, 2012, and in the PAL region on April 19, 2012. It was later released in Japan on August 21, 2013, published by Arc System Works.

Colors! 3D allows users to draw on five layers, each on their own stereoscopic 3D plane. Drawing is done on the bottom screen, while the top screen displays the painting in 3D. While drawing, players can use the various controls on the Nintendo 3DS to change layers, zoom and pan, and alter the pressure of their brush. Pressing the L button allows users to access a menu to change brush type, size, and opacity, modify the layers, use the camera to provide references, and more. When the user finishes their painting, they can export it to the SD card for viewing in the Nintendo 3DS Camera application. Users can also upload their finished creations to an online gallery, viewed on the 3DS or the official website. Gallery features include hashtags and the ability to follow artists and post comments. Each painting also features a replay feature that allows viewers to see how it was drawn. The application also features local multiplayer, allowing several people to work cooperatively on a painting.

In April 2024, the developers of Colors! 3D collaborated with the Pretendo Network project to officially add support for the application, meaning Colors! 3D will continue to operate as normal when using Pretendo Network.

==== Reception ====
IGN gave the application a score of 9.0 and an Editor's Choice award, praising its simple interface and tutorials. Destructoid gave the app a 9.0, calling it "a simple and incredibly fun tool with an amazing community of artists proudly displaying their beautiful and funny 3D images." Nintendo Life gave the app a 9/10, stating, "Though lacking in any structured play, Colors! 3D’s robust free drawing system and unique ability to let anyone create their own three-dimensional artwork more than make up for this."

=== Colors Live ===
A Nintendo Switch successor called Colors Live (stylised as Colors L!ve) was released in 2020 after being funded via a Kickstarter campaign. This expanded upon the features of previous installments by adding new brushes, increasing the maximum number of layers to ten, and introducing blend modes. A new game mode called Colors Quest was also included. A pressure-sensitive pen called the Colors SonarPen was developed in collaboration with GreenBulb to facilitate drawing on the Nintendo Switch, and comes pre-bundled with physical copies of the game. A sequel named Colors Live 2 was announced on September 25, 2026, for the Nintendo Switch 2.

==== Colors Quest ====
This new mode acts as a story-driven adventure wherein players are given a daily drawing challenge with a specific theme and certain stipulations that must be fulfilled. Once the drawing is complete, players must anonymously score other players' submissions, these scores are then aggregated to produce a personal ranking that measures the improvement in the player's art skills over time.
