= Hines Ward =

American football player and coach (born 1976)

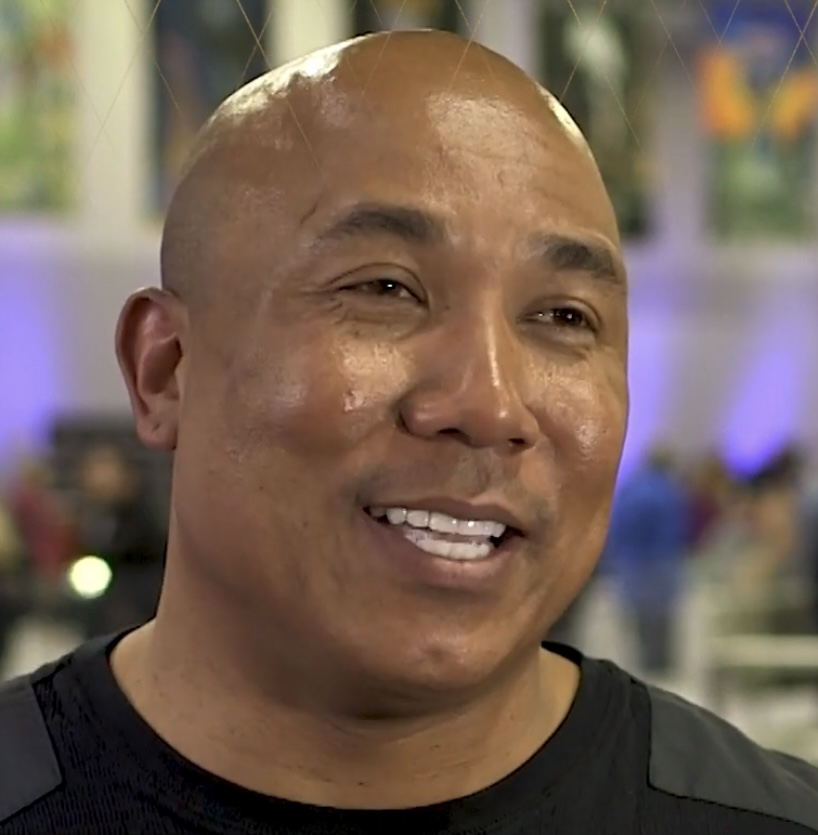
- Ward in 2019

Arizona State Sun Devils
- Title: Associate head coach / Wide receivers coach

Personal information
- Born: March 8, 1976 (age 50); Seoul, South Korea
- Listed height: 6 ft 0 in (1.83 m)
- Listed weight: 205 lb (93 kg)

Career information
- Position: Wide receiver (No. 86)
- High school: Forest Park (Forest Park, Georgia, U.S.)
- College: Georgia (1994–1997)
- NFL draft: 1998: 3rd round, 92nd overall pick

Career history

Playing
- Pittsburgh Steelers (1998–2011)

Coaching
- Pittsburgh Steelers (2017) Intern; New York Jets (2019–2020) Offensive assistant; Florida Atlantic (2021) WR coach; San Antonio Brahmas (2023) Head coach; Arizona State (2024) WR coach; Arizona State (2025–present) Associate HC / WR coach

Operations
- Alliance of American Football (2019) Head of football development

Awards and highlights
- 2× Super Bowl champion (XL, XLIII); Super Bowl MVP (XL); 3× Second-team All-Pro (2002–2004); 4× Pro Bowl (2001–2004); Pittsburgh Steelers All-Time Team; Pittsburgh Steelers Hall of Honor; First-team All-SEC (1997); Second-team All-SEC (1996)

Career NFL statistics
- Receptions: 1,000
- Receiving yards: 12,083
- Receiving touchdowns: 85
- Stats at Pro Football Reference

Hines Edward Ward Jr. (born March 8, 1976) is a Korean-American American football coach and former player who is the wide receivers coach and associate head coach for Arizona State. He played as a wide receiver in the National Football League (NFL) after being selected by the Pittsburgh Steelers in the third round of the 1998 NFL draft. He played college football for the Georgia Bulldogs.

Ward played his entire professional career for the Steelers and he became the team's all-time leader in receptions, receiving yardage and touchdown receptions. Ward was voted MVP of Super Bowl XL and upon retirement was one of eleven NFL players to have at least 1,000 career receptions. Ward is often regarded as one of the best wide receivers of the 2000s, as well as one of key figures for the Steelers' success during the 2000s. Aside from his career in the NFL, Ward has appeared in various forms of film and television media, including the reality TV series Dancing with the Stars and brief cameos in the 2012 film The Dark Knight Rises and in the television series The Walking Dead. He was a studio analyst for NBC's Football Night in America from 2012 to 2015. Ward joined CNN and HLN in May 2016. He was the player relations executive of the Alliance of American Football. In 2019, Ward began his coaching career as an offensive assistant for the New York Jets, working with wide receivers coach Shawn Jefferson. In 2021, Ward was hired by Florida Atlantic as special assistant to the head coach.

Born in Seoul, South Korea to a Korean mother and African-American father, Ward grew up in the Atlanta area. He has become an advocate for the social acceptance of foreigners in Korea, especially blended or mixed race youth.

== Early life ==
Ward was born in Seoul, South Korea to a Korean mother, Kim Young-hee (Korean: 김영희), and African-American father, Hines Ward, on March 8, 1976. His family moved to Atlanta and East Point, Georgia, when Hines Jr. was one year old and Hines Sr. went to West Germany to serve a tour of duty. The next year, Ward's parents divorced, with Ward living with his mother and then with his paternal grandmother after Hines Sr. pleaded in family court that Kim could not easily raise Hines Jr. independently, as she did not speak English sufficiently. At the age of 7, Ward was reunited with his mother. For reasons not disclosed to the public, during this time, Ward Sr. did not support Ward with child support or visit him regularly. In 2006, Ward stated that he talked with his father about once every two years. That same year Ward stated that he had yet to reconcile with his father who left Hines Jr. when he was two years old. Ward Sr. died in 2024.

Under the guidance of coach Mike Parris at Forest Park High School in Forest Park, Georgia, Ward showcased his athletic skills as a quarterback and was two-time Clayton County Offensive Player of the Year. He also excelled in baseball and was selected by the Florida Marlins in the 73rd round (1,646th overall) of the 1994 MLB draft.

== Playing career ==
=== College ===
As a wide receiver for the University of Georgia Bulldogs (1994–1997), Ward's 149 career receptions for 1,965 yards placed him second in team history. He also played tailback and totaled 3,870 all-purpose yards, second only to Herschel Walker in Bulldogs history. In 1995, Ward played some quarterback his sophomore year. He holds Georgia bowl game records for pass attempts, pass completions, and passing yards in the 1995 Peach Bowl in which he completed 31 of 59 passes for 413 yards. Despite his performance at the quarterback position as a Sophomore, Ward primarily played receiver his final two years of college play only attempting a handful of passes during those seasons. In 1996, Ward had 52 receptions for 900 yards, and also ran 26 times for 170 yards. In 1997, he hauled in 55 passes for 715 yards and scored six touchdowns while, and also ran 30 times for 223 yards, getting All-SEC honors in the process.

When he came out of college, it was discovered that Ward was missing an anterior cruciate ligament (ACL) in his left knee, which he lost during a bicycle accident during childhood. According to a Yahoo! Sports article, Ward broke his kneecap in the fourth grade and the doctors never accounted for the ligament.

=== National Football League ===
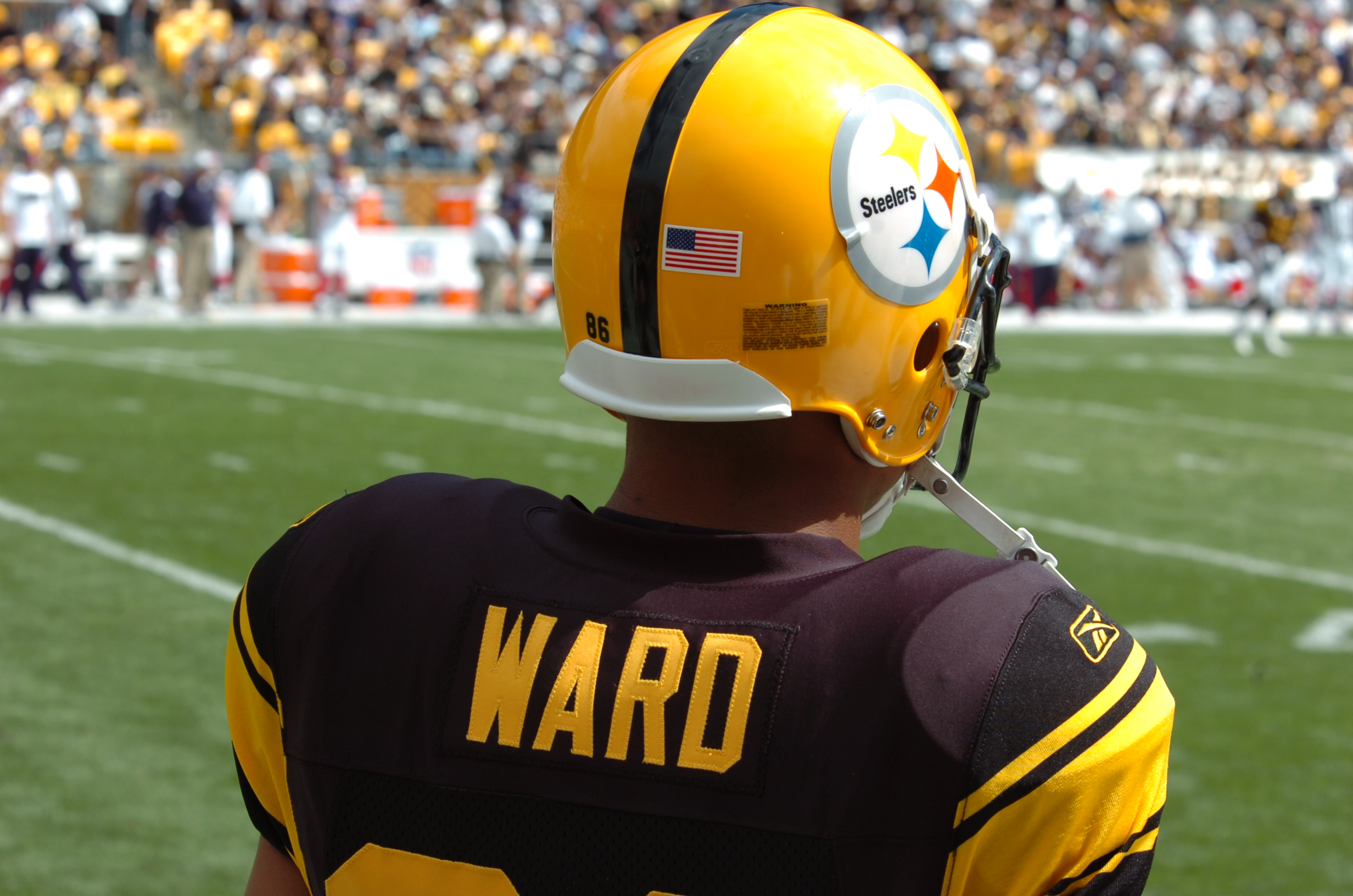
Ward in 2007 with the Steelers

Pre-draft measurables
| Height | Weight | Arm length | Hand span | 20-yard shuttle | Three-cone drill | Vertical jump |
|---|---|---|---|---|---|---|
| 5 ft 11 5/8 in (1.82 m) | 195 lb (88 kg) | 30 1/2 in (0.77 m) | 9 in (0.23 m) | 4.09 s | 7.09 s | 30.5 in (0.77 m) |
All values from NFL Combine

Coming out of the University of Georgia, Ward was regarded as one of the top five receivers in the 1998 NFL draft, along with Kevin Dyson and Randy Moss. He was projected to be selected at the end of the first round or beginning of the second. The Tampa Bay Buccaneers and Indianapolis Colts expressed major interest in him, visiting him multiple times to meet with him. After it was discovered Ward did not have an ACL in one of his legs, his value dropped. The Buccaneers chose to draft Jacquez Green (34th overall) and the Colts chose Jerome Pathon (32nd overall) instead, both wide receivers.

=== Pittsburgh Steelers ===
==== 1998 ====
Ward was selected by the Pittsburgh Steelers in the third round (92nd overall) of the 1998 NFL Draft.

On July 20, 1998, the Steelers signed him to a three-year, $885,000 contract. Ward contributed in a wide receiver group that included Courtney Hawkins, Charles Johnson, and Will Blackwell. He played in his first career game on September 6, 1998, against the Baltimore Ravens, catching a 12-yard pass from Kordell Stewart. During a Week 10 contest against the Green Bay Packers, he caught two passes for a season-high 56 yards. Although he appeared in every game during his first season, he finished with only 15 receptions for 246 receiving yards.

==== 1999 ====
In 1999, Ward saw more action after former starting wide receiver Charles Johnson departed for Philadelphia during the off-season. He began the season as the starting wide receiver in the season opener against the Cleveland Browns. Ward caught his first career touchdown from Mike Tomczak and finished the game with a total of three catches for 51 yards in the 43–0. On October 10, 1999, he had 6 receptions for 67 receiving yards, and caught a touchdown from Kordell Stewart against the Buffalo Bills in Week 5. In Week 12, he accounted for a season-high seven receptions and 89 receiving yards, and caught a 34-yard touchdown in a 20–27 loss to the Cincinnati Bengals. During the first quarter of a Week 14 matchup against the Ravens, Ward caught a 21-yard touchdown pass from Jerome Bettis. Ward finished his second season with 61 catches, 638 receiving yards, and seven touchdowns in 16 games and 14 starts.

==== 2000 ====
In a Week 7 15–0 win over Cincinnati, Ward accumulated a season-high 91 receiving yards on two catches, while scoring a 77-yard touchdown, his first of the season. In his last season under offensive coordinator Kevin Gilbride, Ward finished with a total of 48 receptions for 672 yards and four touchdowns.

==== 2001 ====
On September 8, 2001, Ward was signed to a four-year, $9.5 million contract extension.

In his first year under new offensive coordinator Mike Mularkey, Ward had his best season of his career to that point. Against the Jacksonville Jaguars in Week 10, Ward came away with nine receptions for 112 yards and scored a 28-yard touchdown in a 20–7 victory. This also marked his first game with over 100 receiving yards in his career. On December 9, 2001, against the New York Jets, Ward accumulated a season-high ten catches for 124 receiving yards in the 18–7 win. The 2001 season marked his first season with 16 starts and over 1,000 receiving yards, as he finished with 94 catches for 1,003 receiving yards and four touchdown catches. Along with Jerome Bettis, Kordell Stewart, Alan Faneca, Jason Gildon, and Kendrell Bell, he was voted to the 2001 Pro Bowl, making it the first of his career. He played in his first playoff game of his career in 2001, making three receptions for 37 yards in a 27–10 divisional win over the Ravens. The next week, as the Steelers played the New England Patriots in the AFC Championship, he caught six passes for 64 receiving yards in a 17–24 loss to the eventual Super Bowl XXXVI Champions.

==== 2002 ====
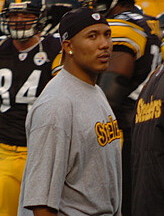
Ward achieved his only 100+ reception season in 2002

In Week 2 of the 2002 season, Ward caught seven passes for 92 receiving yards and two touchdowns in a 17–30 loss to the Oakland Raiders. It was his first game with more than a single touchdown in his career. In Week 4, a 16–13 overtime win over the Cleveland Browns, he had nine receptions of 104 yards. On November 10, 2002, Ward had his best game of the season, making a season-high 11 receptions, 139 receiving yards, and a touchdown during a 34–34 tie with the Atlanta Falcons. The following week, he caught 10 passes for a season-high 168 receiving yards and caught two touchdowns in a 23–31 loss to the Titans. It was his third game of the season with 2 touchdown receptions. He continued to dominate the next game against the Bengals, as he had 125 yards on 10 receptions, while also scoring a 64-yard touchdown during the 29–21 victory. This was Ward's third consecutive game with over 100 receiving yards and a touchdown. The Steelers finished the season 10–5–1 and made the playoffs for the second year in a row. On January 5, 2003, they played the Browns in the AFC Wild Card Round. Ward finished the game with 11 catches, 104 receiving yards, and also caught his first career postseason touchdown in the 36–33 victory. The following week, the Steelers played at Tennessee in the Divisional Round playoff game. Although they lost 31–34 in overtime, Ward finished with seven catches for 82 receiving yards and two touchdowns. Along with teammate Alan Faneca, Ward was selected to play in his second consecutive Pro Bowl. He finished his fifth season with 1,329 receiving yards, 112 receptions, and 12 touchdown receptions, all career-highs. This also was his only season with over 100 receptions.

==== 2003 ====
After having the best season of his career, Ward returned in 2003 to make nine catches for 91 receiving yards and two touchdowns in the season-opening win over the Ravens. The following game, he caught another nine passes for 146 yards in a 20–41 loss at the Kansas City Chiefs. On November 30, 2003, Ward caught a career-high 13 passes for 149 receiving yards and a touchdown in a loss to the Bengals. In 2003, the Steelers voted him their team MVP as he caught a total of 95 receptions for 1,163 yards and 10 touchdowns for the season. He was voted, along with Faneca, to his third consecutive Pro Bowl.

==== 2004 ====
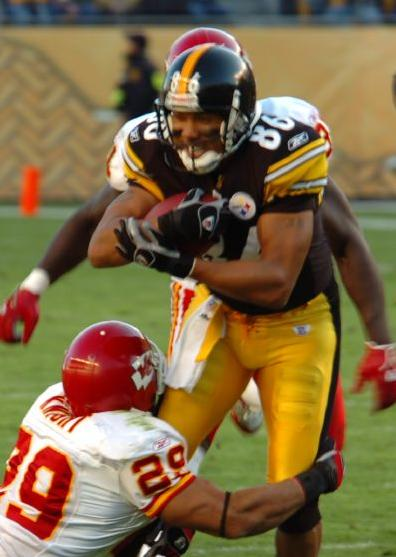
Ward attempts to break Sammy Knight's tackle during a game against the Kansas City Chiefs

After three successful years with Mike Mularkey, Ward began the season under new offensive coordinator Ken Whisenhunt and new wide receivers coach Bruce Arians. On September 19, 2004, he caught six passes for 151 receiving yards and a touchdown in a 13–30 loss at Baltimore. During the fourth quarter, starting quarterback Tommy Maddox was injured and replaced by rookie quarterback Ben Roethlisberger. After replacing Maddox, Roethlisberger threw a touchdown pass to Ward, making it the first one of their careers together. During a Week 3 contest at the Miami Dolphins, Ward caught 9 passes for 96 yards and a touchdown. After replacing Maddox, Roethlisberger led the Steelers to 14 wins in a row. On December 18, 2004, Ward made nine catches for a season-high 134 yards as Pittsburgh beat the Giants 33–30 for their 13th consecutive victory. After finishing the season 15–1, the Steelers played the Jets in the Divisional Round. During the 20–17 win, Ward racked up ten catches for 105 receiving yards and a touchdown. On January 23, 2005, the Steelers lost 27–41 to the eventual Super Bowl XXXIX Champions, the New England Patriots. In the AFC Championship, Ward pulled in five catches for 109 yards and a touchdown. For the fourth year in a row, he was voted to the Pro Bowl along with Alan Faneca. In the game, he had 63 receiving yards on three receptions and scored a touchdown. He finished the season having caught 80 passes for 1,004 receiving yards and four touchdowns. This also marked his fourth year with over 1,000 receiving yards.

==== 2005 ====
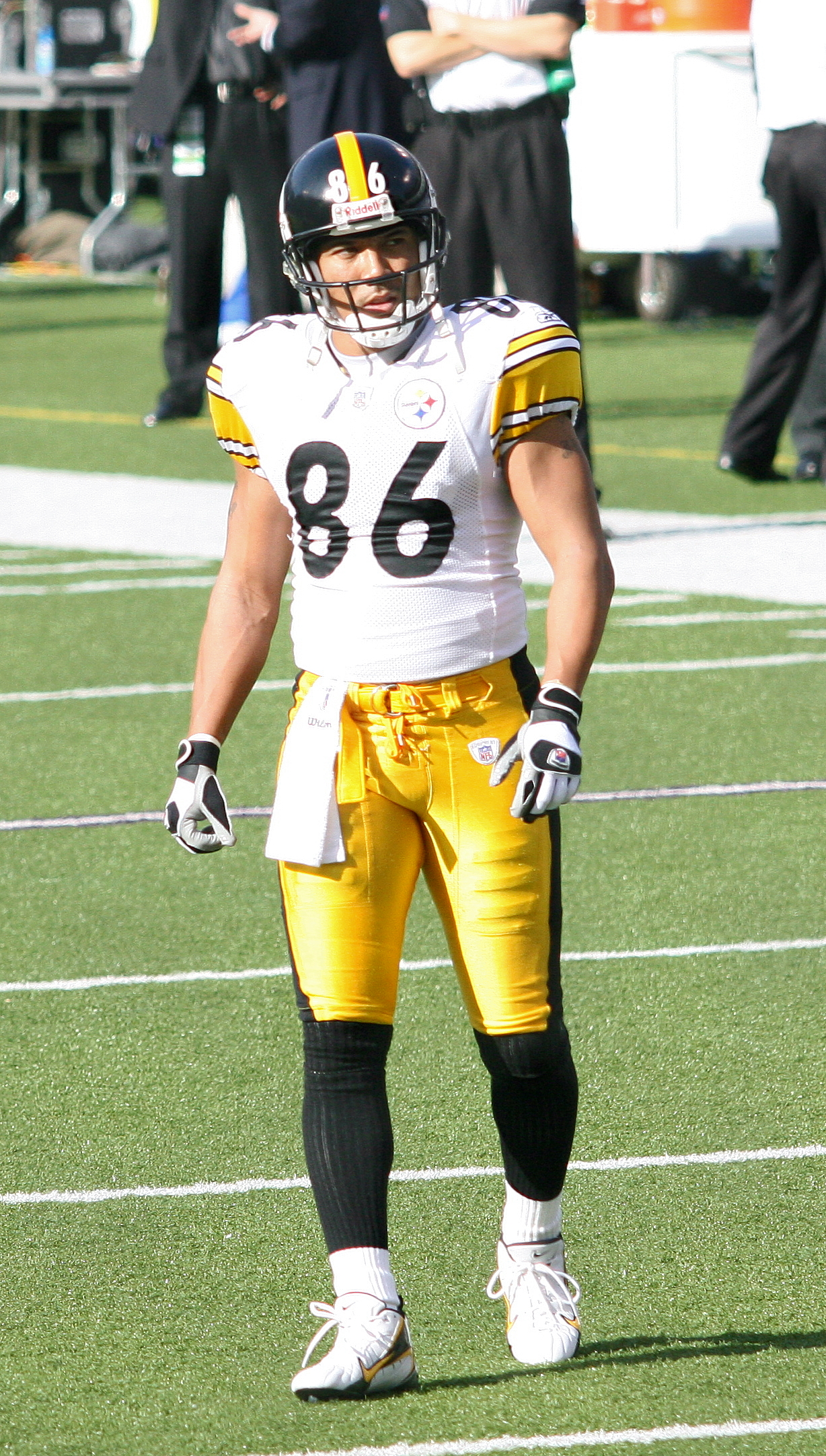
Ward won the title of Super Bowl MVP in Super Bowl XL at the end of the 2005 season

In 2005, Ward missed the first two weeks of training camp in a holdout for a contract extension that would increase his salary. Ward had considered holding out before camp in 2004, but had been persuaded after meeting with the Steelers' owner Dan Rooney and Jerome Bettis. He was told they could work out an extension during the year and he'd be paid fairly. With a great relationship with Dan Rooney, he conceded and eventually showed up on August 15, 2005, on the sidelines for Pittsburgh's first preseason game against the Philadelphia Eagles. That night, though, he did not play in the game. On September 5, 2005, the Steelers announced that they had reached an agreement on a four-year contract extension worth $25.83 million with Ward. On September 18, 2005, he caught six passes for 84 receiving yards and two touchdowns in a 27–7 victory over the Texans. The next week, Ward had four catches for 110 receiving yards and two touchdowns, including an 85-yard touchdown reception, against the Patriots. Although they lost to the defending Super Bowl Champions 20–23, this marked Ward's first back-to-back games with two touchdown receptions. After starting 88 consecutive games, Ward missed the game against the Jaguars on October 16.

On November 13, 2005, Ward became the Steelers' all-time leading receiver with his 538th catch against the Browns on ESPN Sunday Night Football surpassing John Stallworth's record. The Steelers won 34–21. In Week 13 against the Bengals, Ward hauled in a season-high nine receptions for 135 receiving yards and two touchdown receptions. He finished the 2005 season with 69 receptions for 975 yards and 11 touchdowns. After finishing the season 11–5, the Steelers played the Bengals in the AFC Wild Card Round on January 8, 2006. Ward finished the Steelers playoff victory over Cincinnati with only two catches for ten yards, and also scored a five-yard touchdown. The next week, he caught three passes for 68 receiving yards as the Steelers beat the Indianapolis Colts 21–18 in the Divisional Round. In the 2005 AFC Championship game at the Denver Broncos, he had 59 receiving yards on five receptions while also making a touchdown catch, as the Steelers won 34–17. On February 5, 2006, Ward played in his first career Super Bowl. In Super Bowl XL, he accumulated five receptions, 123 receiving yards, and caught a 43-yard touchdown reception from wide receiver Antwaan Randle El to seal the Steelers' 21–10 victory over the Seattle Seahawks. He was named the MVP in Super Bowl XL. This made him the second foreign-born player to earn the accolade. The Steelers also named Ward their co-MVP of the season along with Casey Hampton.

Immediately following Super Bowl XL, Ward was videotaped for the "I'm Going to Disney World!" television commercial, adding "...and I'm taking The Bus!" Ward and Steelers teammate Jerome "The Bus" Bettis appeared in a victory parade at the Magic Kingdom theme park on February 6 along with Emmitt Smith.

==== 2006 ====
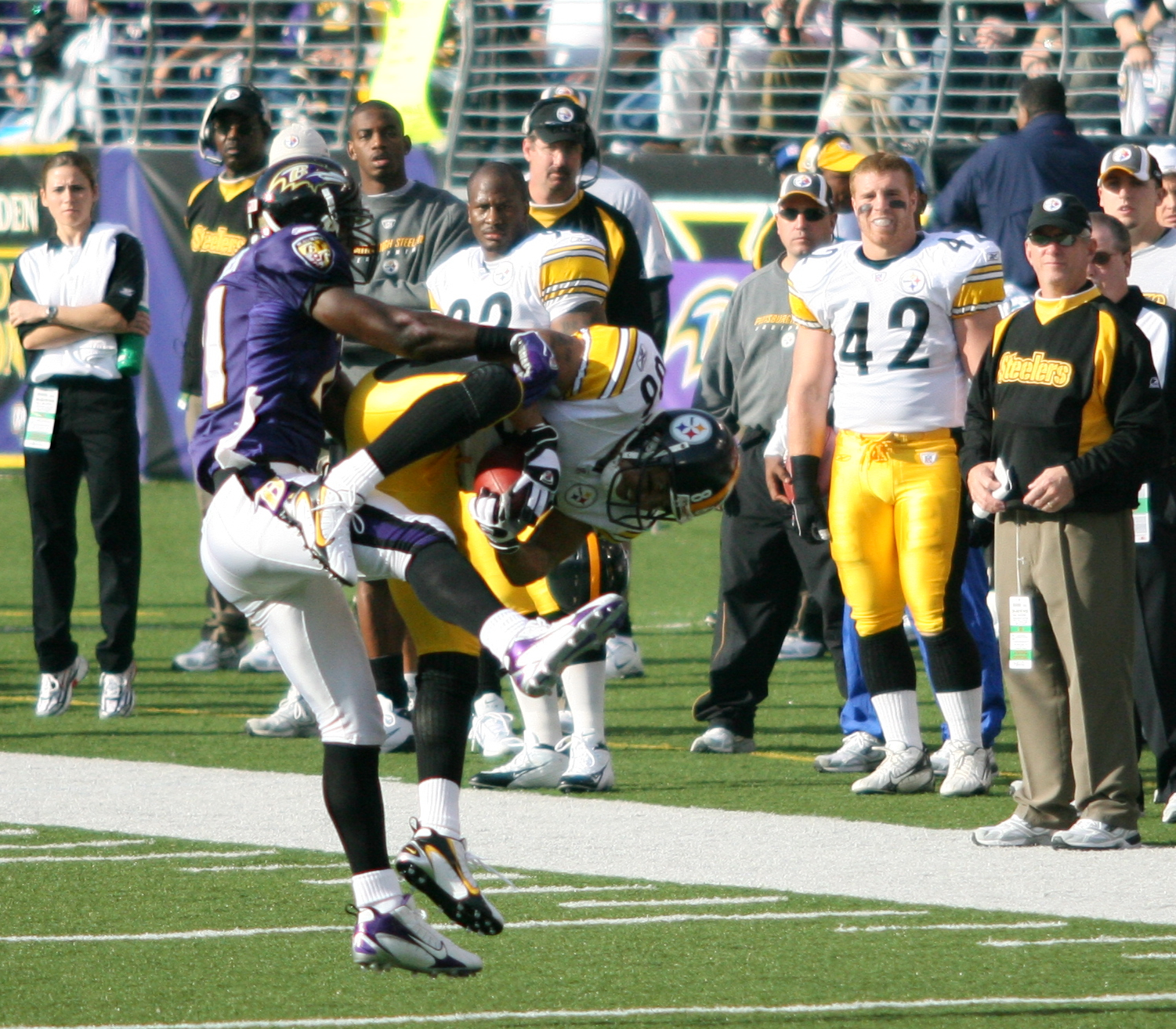
Ward makes a catch against the Baltimore Ravens in 2006.

In Week 7 of the 2006 season, Ward caught eight receptions for a career-high 171 receiving yards and caught three touchdowns for the first time in his career, as they lost 38–41 to the Atlanta Falcons. In Week 9, he had seven receptions for 127 yards in a 31–20 loss to the Denver Broncos. During the season, he missed Weeks 13 and 14 and only finished his second season in a row with exactly 975 receiving yards. After the Steelers finished 8–8 and missed the playoffs, Head Coach Bill Cowher announced he was retiring.

==== 2007 ====
After eight years under Bill Cowher, Ward had the second coach of his career, as the Steelers organization hired Minnesota Vikings defensive coordinator Mike Tomlin as their new head coach. This also marked his first season under offensive coordinator Bruce Arians, as Ken Whisenhunt left to become the Arizona Cardinals head coach. As the Steelers played the Bengals on October 28, 2007, Ward hauled in eight passes for 88 yards and two touchdowns. On December 2, 2007, he caught a season-high 11 passes for 90 receiving yards and two touchdown receptions during the 24–10 victory over the Bengals. The two touchdowns against the Bengals made Ward the Steelers' all-time touchdown receptions leader with his 64th touchdown reception. Then on December 20, 2007, Ward became the Steelers' all-time receiving yardage leader in a game against the St. Louis Rams.

In his first year under Mike Tomlin, the Steelers finished 10–6 and made the playoffs. Although they lost the AFC Wild Card Round matchup 29–31 to Jacksonville, Ward made ten receptions for 135 receiving yards. Ward finished his ninth season with 71 receptions, 732 receiving yards, and seven touchdowns. During the season, he missed Weeks 4, 5, and 17, making it the most games he missed in a single season.

==== 2008 ====
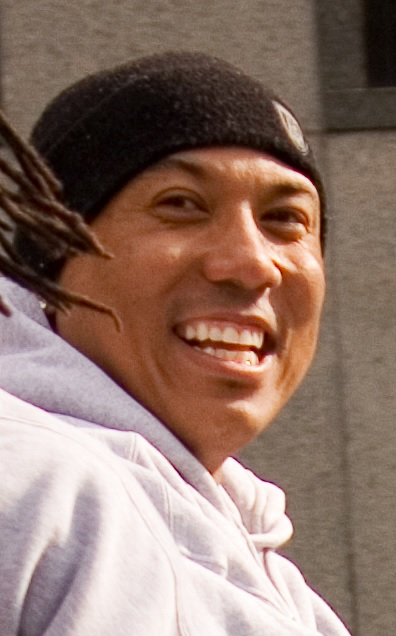
Ward in the Super Bowl parade after the Steelers Super Bowl XLIII victory

Ward began the 2008 NFL season with two touchdown catches in a 38–16 victory over the Houston Texans. On November 16, 2008, he caught a season-high 11 passes for 124 yards against the San Diego Chargers. During a Week 16 contest at the Tennessee Titans, Ward racked up a total of 7 receptions for 109 receiving yards and scored a touchdown as the Steelers lost 14–31. The next week on December 28, 2008, Ward caught his 800th NFL reception, extending his record for receptions by a Steelers receiver. Ward completed the season with 81 receptions, 1,043 receiving yards, and seven touchdown receptions.

The Steelers finished the 2008 regular season with a 12–4 record and made the playoffs. During the AFC Divisional Round game against the San Diego Chargers, Ward caught four passes for 70 yards. The following week in the AFC Championship, he made three receptions for 55 yards as they beat the Ravens 23–14 to go on to Super Bowl XLIII. On February 1, 2009, the Steelers played the Arizona Cardinals, led by the Steelers' former offensive coordinator Ken Whisenhunt. During the game, Ward played a supporting role behind Santonio Holmes, who was the game's MVP, but made two receptions for 43 yards, as the Steelers won 27–23 on a last-minute touchdown reception by Holmes. He played the game with a sprained right MCL.

==== 2009 ====
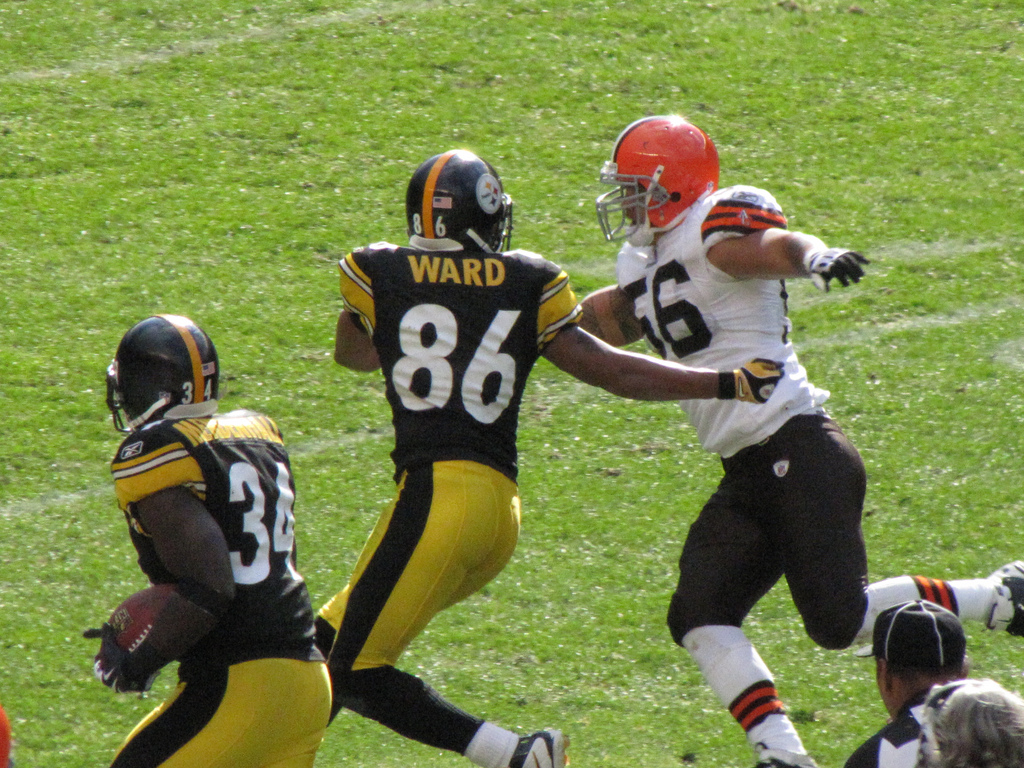
Ward blocking for Rashard Mendenhall during a game in 2009

On April 25, 2009, the Steelers signed Ward to a four-year, $22 million extension with a signing bonus of $3 million.

In the Steelers' home opener, he had 8 catches for 103 receiving yards in a 13–10 overtime win over the Tennessee Titans. On September 27, 2009, during a game against Cincinnati, Ward's four catches for 82 yards earned him 10,000 career receiving yards and made him the first wide receiver in Steelers' history to achieve that milestone. On third-and-two Ben Roethlisberger hit Ward for a 14-yard gain, giving Ward 10,001 career receiving yards. During a Week 6 contest against the Browns, Ward accumulated eight receptions, 159 receiving yards, and a touchdown.The game marked his third game of the season with over 100 receiving yards. He had his fourth game with over a hundred yards on November 22, as he had a season-high ten catches for 128 yards and a touchdown against the Kansas City Chiefs. On December 20, 2009, Ward caught seven passes for 126 receiving yards in a 37–36 victory over the Green Bay Packers. This was the first time Ward had five games with over 100 receiving yards in a single season.

Ward finished the 2009 season with 95 receptions for 1,167 yards and six touchdowns as the Steelers finished 9–7.

==== 2010 ====
After the Steelers drafted Mike Wallace in 2009 and Emmanuel Sanders and Antonio Brown in 2010, Ward began to have a decline in his receptions. In the 2010 home opener against the Falcons, Ward had six receptions for 108 receiving yards as the Steelers won 15–9. In the game against the Atlanta Falcons, Ward became the first player in Steelers history to surpass 11,000 receiving yards. He caught 108 yards worth of passes in that game to pass Hall of Fame Steelers receiver John Stallworth for the most 100-yard receiving games all-time for the Steelers with his 26th. His six catches against the Falcons gave him 901 for his career, making him only the 12th NFL player of all time to surpass 900 career receptions. On October 24, 2010, he had a season-high 131 receiving yards on seven receptions and scored a touchdown against the Miami Dolphins. In Week 14 against the Bengals, he hauled in a season-high eight passes for 115 yards. Ward's streak of 186 consecutive games with at least one reception came to an end in a 39–26 loss against the New England Patriots in Week 10 of the 2010 season. A short catch by Ward was knocked loose when he was tackled by safeties Patrick Chung and James Sanders, and was knocked out of the rest of the game; the Patriots challenged the call, and the pass was ruled incomplete on review, ending the streak. On January 15, 2011, the Steelers faced the Baltimore Ravens in the Divisional Round. Ward finished the contest with three receptions for 25 yards and a touchdown, as the Steelers won 31–24. The next week in the AFC Championship, he had two catches for 14 yards as the Steelers beat the New York Jets 24–19 to advance to Super Bowl XLV. On February 6, 2011, Ward appeared in his third Super Bowl with the Steelers against the Green Bay Packers. In his first career Super Bowl loss, he caught 7 passes for 78 receiving yards and a touchdown.

He finished the 2010 season with 59 receptions, 755 receiving yards, and five receiving touchdowns. He had not had a season below 60 catches since 2000.

==== 2011 ====
In Week 5, against the Tennessee Titans, Ward had seven catches for 54 receiving yards and two touchdown receptions. In this game, he caught the last touchdown of his career on an 8-yard touchdown pass from Ben Roethlisberger in the second quarter. On December 4, 2011, in a 35–7 home victory against the Cincinnati Bengals, Ward became the 19th player in NFL history to reach 12,000 receiving yards. On January 1, 2012, in a game against the Cleveland Browns, Ward caught his 1,000th reception, becoming the eighth player in NFL history to do so. He also caught his last career reception during the game. He appeared in his last game with the Steelers on January 8, 2012, as the Steelers lost 23–29 to the Denver Broncos in the AFC Wild Card Round. He finished his last season with a total of 46 receptions, 381 receiving yards, and two touchdowns in 15 games and nine starts.

On March 7, 2012, the Steelers announced their intention to cut and release Ward, which they did two days later.

On March 20, 2012, Ward announced his retirement from professional football stating, "Without the support over the past 14 years this game wouldn't be the same to me. It wouldn't be as fun for me. You guys meant the world to me. The city and this organization means the world to me. So today as sadly as it feels for me right now, I hope it will be a good day for everyone here."

Ward accumulated 76 receptions, 1,064 yards, and eight receiving touchdowns in 14 post-season appearances.

Although the Steelers have not officially retired Ward's #86, they have not reissued it since his retirement and it is understood that no Steeler will ever wear it again.

=== Legacy ===
Ward's versatility, hands, and willingness to block served him well as a professional wide receiver. Since being drafted by the Steelers in the third round of the 1998 NFL draft, he earned three team Most Valuable Player (MVP) selections. He was also a four-time NFL Pro Bowl selection (2001–2004). Ward also had a streak of 4 consecutive 1,000-yard seasons. The streak was broken in the 2005 NFL season during which he missed a game due to injury. In 2002, he set a Steelers franchise record for receptions (112) and touchdowns (12) (both since broken by Antonio Brown) and was named to his first of two consecutive All-NFL teams.

Although he was considered one of the best blocking receivers in the NFL, Ward often faced criticism for his style of blocking, particularly for his propensity to hit defenders on their blind side. During a game on October 19, 2008, Ward put a vicious downfield blindside block on rookie Cincinnati Bengals linebacker Keith Rivers. The impact of the block left Rivers with a broken jaw, and caused him to miss the remainder of the 2008 season. Ward was not penalized for this block, nor was he fined by the league as the hit was deemed legal. The league, however, later passed a new rule banning such hits. The so-called "Hines Ward Rule" made a blindside block illegal if the block came from the blocker's helmet, forearm or shoulder and lands to the head or neck area of a defender. In a Sports Illustrated poll of NFL players in 2009, he was voted the "dirtiest player in the NFL."

== NFL career statistics ==
Legend
| | Won the Super Bowl |
| | Super Bowl MVP |
| **Bold** | Career high |

=== Regular season ===
| Year | Team | GP | Receiving | | | | | | Fumbles | |
| Year | Team | GP | Rec | Yds | Avg | Lng | TD | FD | Fum | Lost |
|---|---|---|---|---|---|---|---|---|---|---|
| 1998 | PIT | 16 | 15 | 246 | **16.4** | 45 | 0 | 12 | 0 | 0 |
| 1999 | PIT | 16 | 61 | 638 | 10.5 | 42 | 7 | 31 | 1 | 0 |
| 2000 | PIT | 16 | 48 | 672 | 14.0 | 77 | 4 | 31 | 1 | 0 |
| 2001 | PIT | 16 | 94 | 1,003 | 10.7 | 34 | 4 | 52 | 1 | **1** |
| 2002 | PIT | 16 | **112** | **1,329** | 11.9 | 72 | **12** | **66** | 1 | **1** |
| 2003 | PIT | 16 | 95 | 1,163 | 12.2 | 50 | 10 | 60 | 0 | 0 |
| 2004 | PIT | 16 | 80 | 1,004 | 12.6 | 58 | 4 | 52 | 1 | 0 |
| 2005 | PIT | 15 | 69 | 975 | 14.1 | **85** | 11 | 53 | 0 | 0 |
| 2006 | PIT | 14 | 74 | 975 | 13.2 | 70 | 6 | 50 | **2** | **1** |
| 2007 | PIT | 13 | 71 | 732 | 10.3 | 25 | 7 | 47 | 0 | 0 |
| 2008 | PIT | 16 | 81 | 1,043 | 12.9 | 49 | 7 | 55 | 1 | 0 |
| 2009 | PIT | 16 | 95 | 1,167 | 12.3 | 54 | 6 | 56 | **2** | **1** |
| 2010 | PIT | 16 | 59 | 755 | 12.8 | 43 | 5 | 35 | 1 | **1** |
| 2011 | PIT | 15 | 46 | 381 | 8.3 | 31 | 2 | 20 | 1 | **1** |
| Career | | 217 | 1,000 | 12,083 | 12.1 | 85 | 85 | 620 | 12 | 6 |

=== Postseason ===
| Year | Team | GP | Receiving | | | | | | Fumbles | |
| Year | Team | GP | Rec | Yds | Avg | Lng | TD | FD | Fum | Lost |
|---|---|---|---|---|---|---|---|---|---|---|
| 2001 | PIT | 2 | 9 | 101 | 11.2 | 24 | 0 | 4 | 0 | 0 |
| 2002 | PIT | 2 | **18** | 186 | 10.3 | 21 | **3** | 11 | 0 | 0 |
| 2004 | PIT | 2 | 15 | 214 | 14.3 | 30 | 2 | **12** | 0 | 0 |
| 2005 | PIT | 4 | 15 | **260** | 17.3 | **45** | **3** | 11 | 0 | 0 |
| 2007 | PIT | 1 | 10 | 135 | 13.5 | 33 | 0 | 6 | 0 | 0 |
| 2008 | PIT | 3 | 9 | 168 | **18.7** | **45** | 0 | 7 | 0 | 0 |
| 2010 | PIT | 3 | 12 | 117 | 9.8 | 17 | 2 | 7 | 0 | 0 |
| 2011 | PIT | 1 | 0 | 0 | 0.0 | 0 | 0 | 0 | 0 | 0 |
| Career | | 18 | 88 | 1,181 | 13.4 | 45 | 10 | 0 | 0 | 0 |

== Coaching career ==
=== Pittsburgh Steelers ===
In August 2017, Ward served as an offensive intern with the Pittsburgh Steelers, working with their wide receivers.

=== New York Jets ===
In September 2019, Ward began his coaching career and was hired by the New York Jets as a full-time offensive assistant.

=== Florida Atlantic Owls ===
In 2021, the Florida Atlantic University Owls hired Ward as special assistant to the head coach. He also worked alongside wide receivers coach Joey Thomas. He was later promoted to the position of wide receivers coach.

=== San Antonio Brahmas ===
In June 2021, Ward was announced as one of the eight XFL head coaches. He was announced as head coach of the San Antonio Brahmas in July 2022 when team locations were revealed. On December 28, 2023, Ward resigned from the Brahmas after finishing with a 3–7 record in 2023, in response to a change in contract structure.

=== Arizona State Sun Devils ===
In April 2024, Ward became the wide receivers coach for the Arizona State Sun Devils, under second-year head coach Kenny Dillingham. After the season, Ward was promoted to associate head coach.

== Head coaching record ==
=== XFL ===
| Team | Year | Regular season | | | | Postseason | | | |
| Team | Year | Won | Lost | Win % | Finish | Won | Lost | Win % | Result |
|---|---|---|---|---|---|---|---|---|---|
| SA | 2023 | 3 | 7 | .300 | 3rd XFL South | — | — | — | — |
| Total | | 3 | 7 | .300 | | — | — | — | |

== Personal life ==
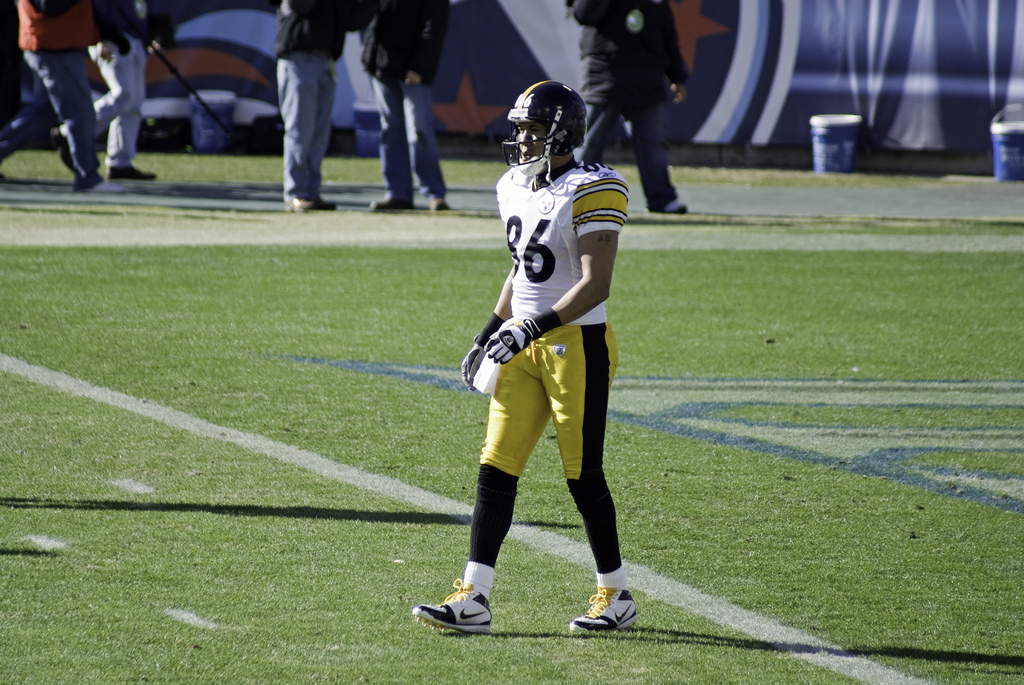
Ward prior to a game in 2008

Ward resides in Sandy Springs, Georgia, with his wife Lindsey Georgalas-Ward. They have one daughter, Londyn. Ward also has a son. On his upper right arm he has a tattoo of Mickey Mouse in the Heisman pose, just below a tattoo of his name in Korean.

=== Business and media enterprises ===
Ward co-owned a bar in Pittsburgh's South Side called The Locker Room. The bar sustained serious water damage in February 2007, due to flooding from a malfunctioning boiler, and it was closed for repairs until June of that year. The bar received an insurance settlement of $500,000, which subsequently became an issue during a legal dispute between the bar's owners.

On September 11, 2007, co-owner Nicholas Lettieri withdrew the entirety of the bar's funds, approximately $19,000, from a corporate account, causing it to miss a large number of scheduled payments. The company filed suit for the return of the money, and Lettieri subsequently justified his actions by claiming that the money was owed to him, also voicing the belief that the other co-owners, Ward and Kimberly Pitts, as well as Pitts' husband, Korry Pitts, had falsified invoices and diverted company funds to their own bank accounts. Company attorney Thomas Castello dismissed Lettieri's allegations as "baseless, ridiculous and unfounded", and the matter currently is before the court. The Locker Room reopened under the name South Side 86 (because of Ward's jersey number), and is owned entirely by Ward, who bought out his co-owners.

Ward hosted the Hines Ward Show on Pittsburgh CBS O&O KDKA-TV from 2006 to 2012. In 2012, shortly after announcing his retirement, it was announced that Ward had signed on with NBC Sports to be a football analyst, highlighted by his role on the Sunday Night Football pregame show Football Night in America.

He opened a restaurant called Table 86 and a wine bar named Vines in Seven Fields with Howard A Shiller from Fort Lauderdale in August 2015. The restaurant closed in March 2019 due to a lawsuit surrounding the partnership dispute for the businesses.

Ward joined CNN and HLN in May 2016. He is a current CNN studio analyst.

In 2018, he joined the Alliance of American Football as the Player Relations Executive.

=== As a figure for social change ===
In 2006, Ward became the first Korean American to win the Super Bowl MVP award. This achievement threw him into the spotlight of media in South Korea.

From April 3 through May 30, 2006, Ward returned to his birthplace of Seoul for the first time since his parents moved to the United States when he was one year old. Ward used his celebrity status to arrange "hope-sharing" meetings with multiracial Korean children and to encourage social and political reform. At one hope-sharing meeting, he told a group of children, "If the country can accept me for who I am and accept me for being a Korean, I'm pretty sure that this country can change and accept you for who you are." On his final day in Korea, he donated US$1 million to create the Hines Ward Helping Hands Foundation, which the AP called "a foundation to help mixed-race children like himself in South Korea, where they have suffered discrimination." He was awarded honorary citizenship by the Seoul Metropolitan Government for his efforts to minimize discrimination in Korea against half-Koreans.

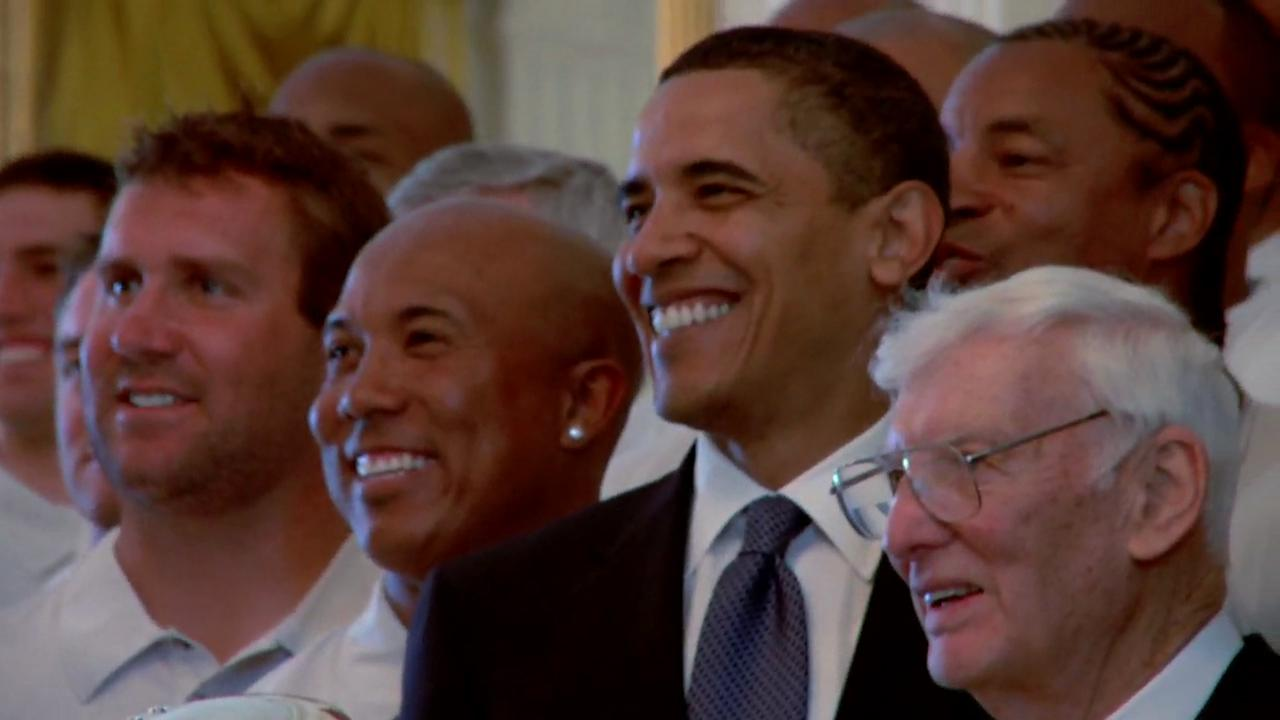
Ward and the Steelers with Barack Obama in 2009

In September 2010, President Barack Obama appointed Ward as a member of the President's Advisory Commission on Asian Americans and Pacific Islanders.

=== DUI arrest ===
On July 9, 2011, Ward was arrested for driving under the influence in DeKalb County, Georgia, after being witnessed by a MARTA police officer failing to maintain his lane and subsequently hitting a curb. An officer of the DeKalb County Police Department responded which led to the investigation and Ward's arrest. On February 22, 2012, the DUI charge was dropped as part of a plea agreement. Ward agreed to plead guilty to reckless driving and received a sentence of one year of probation, 80 hours of community service and a $2,000 fine.

=== Film and TV appearances ===
Ward made an appearance as a member of the fictional Gotham Rogues football team in the 2012 film The Dark Knight Rises, and was one of the members of "Team Rachael" in the second season of Food Network's Rachael vs. Guy: Celebrity Cook-Off. He appeared in the ninth episode of the third season of The Walking Dead, appearing as a walker. He also appeared on Celebrity Wife Swap.

== Other sporting appearances ==
=== Dancing with the Stars performance ===
On May 24, 2011, Ward and his partner Kym Johnson won the twelfth season of the American TV dance competition Dancing with the Stars.

| Week # | Dance/Song | Judges' score | | | Result |
| Week # | Dance/Song | Inaba | Goodman | Tonioli | Result |
| 1 | Cha-Cha-Cha/ "Club Can't Handle Me" | 7 | 7 | 7 | No Elimination |
| 2 | Quickstep/ "Part-Time Lover" | 8 | 7 | 8 | Safe |
| 3 | Samba/ "Fantasy" | 9 | 8 | 8 | Safe |
| 4 | Paso Doble/ "Explosive / Adagio for Strings" | 9 | 8 | 8 | Safe |
| 5 | Rumba/ "God Bless The USA" | 9 | 9 | 9 | Safe |
| 6 | Viennese Waltz/ "End of the Road" | 9 | 9 | 9 | Safe |
| 7 | Team Cha-Cha-Cha/ "We R Who We R"; Tango/ "La lección de Tango" | 7*/7; 9*/9 | 8; 8 | 8; 10 | Safe |
| 8 | Foxtrot/"This Will Be"; Jive/ "Chantilly Lace" | 9; 9 | 9; 9 | 10; 8 | Safe |
| 9 Semi-finals | Argentine Tango/ "Perhaps, Perhaps, Perhaps"; Salsa/"Hello"; Winner Take All Cha-Cha-Cha/ "Just Dance" | 10; 10; Awarded | 10; 10; 0 | 10; 10; Points | Safe |
| 10; Finals | Quickstep/"Puttin' On The Ritz"; Freestyle/"Dancing Machine" and "I Want You Back"; Samba/"Fantasy" | 10; 10; 10 | 9; 10; 10 | 10; 10; 10 | WON |

* In week 7, Donnie Burns was the guest judge and scored the dances as well (first score listed is Burns').

=== Triathlon ===
In 2012, Ward began training for the 2013 Ironman World Championships, enlisting the help of triathlon legend Paula Newby-Fraser. On June 9, 2013, he competed in the Ironman Kansas 70.3. His finish time was 5:53:18, which earned him the overall rank of 623. On October 12, 2013, Ward completed the Ironman World Championships. He finished with a time of 13:08:15. Upon completion, he told Mike Florio at NBC that he will "never" compete in another triathlon and that he was "one and done".

=== 2018 Winter Olympics Honorary Ambassador ===
Ward was named an honorary ambassador for the 2018 Winter Olympics in Pyeongchang.

Awards and achievements
| Preceded by Jennifer Grey & Derek Hough | Dancing with the Stars (US) winners Season 12 (Spring 2011 with Kym Johnson) | Succeeded by J. R. Martinez and Karina Smirnoff |
