= Code Red =

Code Red may refer to:

== Arts and entertainment ==
=== Television ===
- Code Red (American TV series), a 1981–82 American television series
- Code Red (Indian TV series), a 2015 Indian television show

=== Music ===
- Code Red (Cindy Blackman album), 1992
- Code Red (DJ Jazzy Jeff & the Fresh Prince album), 1993
- Code Red (Sodom album), 1999
- Code Red (Monica album), 2015
- Code Red (group), a 1990s British boy band
- "Code Red", a song by Jay Rock from the album Follow Me Home (2011)

== Computing ==
- Code Red (computer worm), a 2001 computer worm
  - Code Red II, a 2001 computer worm

== Other uses ==
- Code Red (medical), an emergency alert code used in hospitals
- Code Red DVD, an independent American home entertainment company specializing in retro grindhouse, exploitation, and horror films
- Code Rood, Dutch for "code red" and the name of a climate activist group in the Netherlands
- "Code Red", a US Marine hazing ritual dramatized in the 1989 play A Few Good Men and its 1992 film adaptation
- Mountain Dew Code Red, a cherry-flavored soft drink

== See also ==
- Red Alert (disambiguation)
- Redcode (disambiguation)
