= Color-code (band) =

Japanese pop group

color-code
- Origin: Japan
- Genres: Japanese Pop, Dance
- Years active: 2013–present
- Labels: Nippon Columbia (2014-2017); Dreamusic (2018-present)
- Members: Tsujikawa Nanami; Yasukawa Marisa; Moriyasu Mako
- Website: color-code.jp/

Color-code (stylized as color-code) is an all-female Japanese pop group formed by Italian-Japanese fashion director and editor, Nicola Formichetti.

== History ==
In 2013, Nicola Formichetti, a frequent collaborator with singer-songwriter Lady Gaga, teamed up with Nippon Columbia to hold the POP ICON PROJECT TOKYO. Auditions "to discover a Japanese version of Lady Gaga" were held and three members were selected, Tsujikawa Nanami and Moriyasu Mako, both from Osaka, and Yasukawa Marisa from Chiba.

They released their debut single "I Like Dat" on September 17, 2014. Follow up single, "Hands UP!" was released on May 20, 2015.

In 2018, color-code signed with a new label, Dreamusic, and released single "if ~kono-goe ga todokunara~". In 2020, they released their debut album "Re∂l"

== Discography ==
=== Albums ===
| Title | Album Details |
|---|---|
| Re∂l | Release: September 15, 2020; Label: Dreamusic Inc.; Formats: CD |

=== Singles ===
| Release | Title | Chart positions | | | Album |
| Release | Title | Oricon Singles Charts | Billboard Japan Hot 100 | RIAJ digital tracks* | Album |
|---|---|---|---|---|---|
| 2014 | I Like Dat | | | | Non-album single |
| 2015 | Hands UP! | | | | Non-album single |
| 2017 | Sakura ame | | | | Non-album single |
| 2017 | Re start | | | | Re∂l |
| 2017 | Parallel World | | | | Re∂l |
| 2017 | Better Days | | | | Non-album single |
| 2017 | keep it one love | | | | Re∂l |
| 2017 | this city | | | | Re∂l |
| 2018 | if ~kono-goe ga todokunara~ | | | | Non-album single |
| 2018 | Fuyu koi hanabi / SCRAP & BUILD | | | | Non-album single |
| 2019 | KAGEROU | | | | Re∂l |
| 2020 | THE MARCH | | | | Re∂l |
