= Coloring =

Coloring or colouring may refer to:

- Color, or the act of changing the color of an object
  - Coloring, the act of adding color to the pages of a coloring book
  - Coloring, the act of adding color to comic book pages, where the person's job title is Colorist
- Graph coloring, in mathematics
- Hair coloring
- Food coloring
- Hand-colouring of photographs
- Map coloring

== See also ==
- Color code (disambiguation)
- Color grading
