= Love Like This (The Summer Set album) =

Studio album by the Summer Set
- Released: October 13, 2009
- Genres: Alternative rock; pop punk; emo pop; pop; synth-pop; power pop; pop rock
- Length: 35:31
- Label: Razor & Tie
- Producer: Matt Grabe

The Summer Set chronology
Meet Me on the Left Coast (2008)	Love Like This (2009)	Everything's Fine (2011)

Professional ratings
Review scores
Source	Rating
AllMusic	2/5 stars
AbsolutePunk	(72%)

Love Like This is the debut studio album by the American pop rock band The Summer Set released on October 13, 2009, through Razor & Tie.

== Release ==
Released on October 13, 2009, the album was promoted on the band's tour with Cartel, This Providence, and the Bigger Lights. In January 2010, the group supported Every Avenue and Sparks the Rescue on their co-headlining US tour. In March 2010, the band appeared at the Extreme Thing festival. Between late June and early August, the band performed on Warped Tour. It was re-released on July 6, with a bonus Love Like Swift CD with five Taylor Swift song covers available only at Wal-Mart. From late March to early May 2011, the band supported All Time Low on their US tour. On April 11, UK-based independent record label LAB Records released Love Like This for the European market. In addition to the eleven tracks of the standard version, the release carried an acoustic rendition of "Chelsea" recorded at Hurley Studios, the five Swift cover songs performed at The Hoodwink New Jersey from 2010's Love Like Swift and another Swift cover, the iTunes-only bonus track "Fifteen." However, on this version tracks 1–11 are mastered from a lossy source, the audio quality thus being significantly inferior to the original U.S. release.

== Track listing ==
All lyrics by B. Dales, J. Gomez, J. Montgomery, S. Gomez and J. Bowen, except where noted.

1. "The Boys You Do (Get Back at You)" – 3:04
2. "Punch-Drunk Love" – 3:10
3. "Chelsea" – 2:40
4. "Young" – 3:20
5. "Take It Slow" – 2:55
6. "Can You Find Me?" – 3:09
7. "Love Like This" (B. Dales, J. Gomez, S. Hollander, D. Katz) – 3:26
8. "Girls Freak Me Out" – 2:45
9. "Passenger Seat" – 3:49
10. "This Is How We Live" – 2:47
11. "Where Are You Now?" – 4:26
  featuring Dia Frampton of Meg & Dia

iTunes bonus track
No.	Title	Length
12.	"Papercut"	4:16

The Militia Group bonus tracks
No.	Title	Length
12.	"Punch-Drunk Love" (acoustic)	3:09
13.	"Passenger Seat" (acoustic)	3:55

UK bonus tracks
No.	Title	Length
12.	"Chelsea" (acoustic)	2:44
13.	"You Belong with Me" (live)	4:31
14.	"Our Song" (live)	3:35
15.	"Forever and Always" (live)	3:47
16.	"I'm Only Me When I'm With You" (live)	3:58
17.	"Love Story (Ft. Brandon Wronski of Eye Alaska)" (live)	4:23
18.	"Fifteen" (live)	4:38

Bonus live CD – Love Like Swift (Walmart Exclusive) live at Bamboozle's Hoodwink Festival
No.	Title	Lyrics	Length
1.	"You Belong with Me"	Taylor Swift, Liz Rose
2.	"Our Song"	Taylor Swift
3.	"Forever and Always"	Taylor Swift
4.	"I'm Only Me When I'm With You"	Taylor Swift, Orrall, Petraglia
5.	"Love Story (Ft. Brandon Wronski of Eye Alaska)"	Taylor Swift

== Personnel ==
The Summer Set

- Brian Dales – vocals
- John Gomez – guitar
- Stephen Gomez – bass
- Josh Montgomery – guitar
- Jessica Bowen – drums

Production

- Produced and engineered by Matt Grabe
- Additional production by Matt Squire
- "Love Like This" produced by S*A*M and Sluggo

== Charts ==
Chart performance for Love Like This
Chart (2009)	Peak position
US Independent Albums (Billboard)	28
US Billboard 200	173
