= ...In Color =

EP by The Summer Set
- Released: June 24, 2008
- Genre: Indie pop; pop rock
- Label: The Militia Group

The Summer Set chronology
Love The Love You Have (2007)	...In Color (2008)	Meet Me on the Left Coast (2008)

Professional ratings
Review scores
Source	Rating
Alternative Press	2.5/5 stars
Melodic	3.5/5 stars

...In Color is the second studio EP by American rock band The Summer Set, that was released on June 24, 2008, by The Militia Group. It was completed shortly after the band decided to sign with The Militia Group record label. In July, the band went on tour with Anarbor and Eye Alaska. In October, the band supported Sherwood on their tour of the US.

== Track listing ==
1. "Cross Your Fingers"
2. "Seasons"
3. "She's Got The Rhythm"
4. "Close To Me"
5. "Lights'"
