= Hedwig's Theme =

Main theme tune for the Harry Potter films and the Wizard World franchise

Composition by John Williams

from the album Harry Potter and the Philosopher's Stone
- Released: October 30, 2001
- Recorded: August – September 2001
- Studio: Air Lyndhurst & Abbey Road Studios (London)
- Length: 5:08
- Label: Warner Sunset; Nonesuch; Atlantic
- Composer: John Williams

Audio sample
- The theme as it was first featured in Harry Potter and the Philosopher's Stone: file; help

"Hedwig's Theme" is an orchestral piece composed by John Williams. It serves as the main theme for the Harry Potter film series, based on the series of popular fantasy novels of the same name by author J. K. Rowling. The theme first appears in the opening credits of The Philosopher's Stone in the "Prologue" track, a shortened version of the full five-minute theme, which is not featured entirely until the closing credits. The track is named after Harry Potter's pet owl, Hedwig.

Since being featured in The Philosopher's Stone soundtrack, the piece's main theme was further developed by Williams for The Chamber of Secrets and The Prisoner of Azkaban, and by Patrick Doyle, Nicholas Hooper, and Alexandre Desplat for the remaining five Harry Potter films. The theme has also been featured in the Fantastic Beasts spin-off prequel films, various video games, and Universal theme park attractions. "Hedwig's Theme" has gained status as a signature theme of the Wizarding World franchise and is widely regarded as one of the greatest and most iconic film themes of all time.

== Background ==
Warner Bros. and Chris Columbus, director of the first film, initially wanted to get an idea of which composer was best suited to compose the film's score by giving different composers the task of creating a theme for a promotional short for the film. Williams, without having seen any footage from the film, composed the first draft of "Hedwig's Theme" for the short, which he presented to Columbus on piano.

But when I heard the Potter theme, John [Williams] played it for me on the piano. He just plunked out [hums Harry Potter Theme], and I thought, 'This is the guy'… It's one of those great geek moments for a guy who loves movies. I was like, 'Oh my God. I can't imagine what the rest of the score is gonna be like.' And then, the rest of the score was equally astounding.

— Chris Columbus, 2021 interview

== Composition ==
The piece in its entirety is in ternary form. The first section is the most recognizable and is built around the titular "Hedwig's Theme", which John Williams uses as a leitmotif to represent the magical world. The second section is built around the faster "Nimbus" theme, which Williams uses as a leitmotif to represent Harry's broomstick, the Nimbus 2000, and more generally, to represent fast-paced mischief and adventure. The third section restates part of "Hedwig's Theme" in a more intense manner than it was originally stated before leading into a coda that primarily uses material not already introduced in the piece.

=== First Section: "Hedwig's Theme" ===
The opening bars of the piece with the celesta playing the main theme

The first section is in 3/8 time with the tempo direction "Misterioso" and generally follows the key of E minor. The restrained triple meter, minor key, and dotted rhythms are characteristic of the siciliana style, with a particular similarity to Fauré's Sicilienne. "Hedwig's Theme" opens with a solo played on the celesta that introduces the main theme upon which the rest of the section is built. The introductory development of the main theme largely follows E minor, as indicated by the repeated E in the left hand, but in the sixth full measure, the theme momentarily enters D-sharp minor, with the left hand playing an A♯, the fifth of the chord. This creates tension that is then resolved in the seventh bar when the theme returns to E minor. The figure from the first two bars then repeats, this time leading into a series of chords — G minor, F minor, A minor and F♯7 — before resolving back to E minor.
