= RedOne production discography =

The following is a list of songs produced, co-produced and remixed by Swedish-Moroccan producer, songwriter and music executive RedOne.

== Productions ==
=== 1998–2006 ===
Year	Artist	Tracks	Album
1998	Popsie	"Funky"	Popsie
1998	Popsie	"Joyful Life"	Popsie
2000	Hanna	I Min Rosa Ballong	Non-album single
2000	Kinnda	"Freak You Out"	Kinnda
2000	Jill Johnson	"No One Else But You"	Daughter of Eve
2000	No Authority	"Here I Am"	No Authority
2001	Lia Andreen	"Mistreat Me (You'll Be Sorry)"	You Belong To Me
2001	A*Teens	"...To the Music"	Teen Spirit
2002	A*Teens	"Slam"	Pop 'til You Drop
2002	A*Teens	"Singled Out"	Pop 'til You Drop
2003	Kevin Lyttle	"Turn Me On" (dancehall version)	Kevin Lyttle
2004	Daniel Lindström	"Break Free"	Daniel Lindström
2004	Daniel Lindström	"My Love Won't Let You Down"	Daniel Lindström
2005	Carl Henry	"I Wish"	I Wish
2005	Carl Henry	"Little Mama"	I Wish
2005	Carl Henry	"One More Time (Encore Otra Vez)"	I Wish
2005	Ch!pz	"Rhythm of the World"	The World of Ch!pz
2005	Darin	"I Can See U Girl"	The Anthem
2005	Darin	"Encore, Otra Vez, One More Time"	The Anthem
2005	Darin	"What Is Love"	The Anthem
2005	Darin	"Move"	Darin
2005	Darin	"Step Up"	Darin
2005	Darin	"Laura"	Darin
2005	Darin	"B What U Wanna B"	Darin
2005	Darin	"U Don't Hear Me"	Darin
2006	3LW	"Bling Bling"	Point of No Return
2006	EliZe	"Itsy Bitsy Spider"	In Control
2006	Goleo VI	"Intro Bamboo"	Goleo VI presents His 2006 FIFA World Cup Hits
2006	Nora Dalal	"Cuz I Like It"	Non-album single
2006	Ola	"Cops Come Knocking"	Given to Fly
2006	Ola	"Go go Sweden"	Given to Fly
2006	RBD	"Wanna play"	Rebels
2006	RBD	"Cariño mio"	Rebels

=== 2007 ===
Artist	Tracks	Album
Kat DeLuna	"9 Lives"	9 Lives
Kat DeLuna	"Run the Show" (Feat. Shaka Dee or Busta Rhymes)	9 Lives
Kat DeLuna	"Am I Dreaming" (Feat. Akon)	9 Lives
Kat DeLuna	"Whine Up" (Feat. Elephant Man)	9 Lives
Kat DeLuna	"Feel What I Feel"	9 Lives
Kat DeLuna	"Love Me, Leave Me"	9 Lives
Kat DeLuna	"In the End"	9 Lives
Kat DeLuna	"Love Confusion"	9 Lives
Kat DeLuna	"Animal"	9 Lives
Kat DeLuna	"Be Remembered" (Feat. Shaka Dee)	9 Lives
Kat DeLuna	"Enjoy Saying Goodbye"	9 Lives
Kat DeLuna	"How We Roll" (Feat. Shaka Dee)	9 Lives
Kat DeLuna	"You Are Only Mine"	9 Lives
The Cheetah Girls	"Crash"	TCG

=== 2008 ===
Artist	Tracks	Album
Akon	"Against the Grain" (Feat. Ray Lavender)	Freedom
Akon	"Sunny Day" (Feat. Wyclef Jean)	Freedom
Brandy	"True"	Human
Darin	"Breathing Your Love" (Feat. Kat DeLuna)	Flashback
Darin	"Dance"	Flashback
Darin	"Girl Next Door"	Flashback
Darin	"See U at the Club"	Flashback
Darin	"Brought Me Back"	Flashback
Enrique Iglesias	"Takin' Back My Love" (Feat. Ciara)	Greatest Hits
Lady Gaga	"Just Dance" (Feat. Colby O'Donis)	The Fame
Lady Gaga	"LoveGame"	The Fame
Lady Gaga	"Poker Face"	The Fame
Lady Gaga	"Money Honey"	The Fame
Lady Gaga	"Boys Boys Boys"	The Fame
Lady Gaga	"Paper Gangsta"	The Fame
New Kids on the Block	"Big Girl Now" (Feat. Lady Gaga)	The Block
New Kids on the Block	"Dirty Dancing"	The Block
New Kids on the Block	"Summertime" (Redone Remix)	The Block
New Kids on the Block	"Sexify My Love"	The Block
New Kids on the Block	"Full Service" (Feat. New Edition)	The Block
New Kids on the Block	"Put It on My Tab" (Feat. Akon)	The Block
New Kids on the Block	"Looking Like Danger"	The Block
Tami Chynn	"Frozen" (Feat. Akon)	Non-album single
Tami Chynn	"Watch Me Wine" (featuring Voicemail)	Non-album single
Tiffany Evans	"Again"	Tiffany Evans

=== 2009 ===
Artist	Tracks	Album
Alexandra Burke	"What happens on the Dancefloor feat. Cobra Starship"	Overcome (Deluxe)
Alexandra Burke	"The Silence"	Overcome
Alexandra Burke	"Broken Heels"	Overcome
Alexandra Burke	"Dumb"	Overcome
Backstreet Boys	"Straight Through My Heart"	This Is Us
Backstreet Boys	"All of Your Life (Need Love)"	This Is Us
Cinema Bizarre	"I Came 2 Party" (Feat. Space Cowboy)	ToyZ
Colby O'Donis	"I Wanna Touch You"	Non-album single
Flipsyde	"When It Was Good"	State of Survival
Flipsyde	"A Change"	State of Survival
Flipsyde	"Green Light"	State of Survival
Jada	"American Cowboy"	Non-album single
Kat DeLuna	"Put It On" (featuring Lil Wayne)	Non-album single
Lady Gaga	"Bad Romance"	The Fame Monster
Lady Gaga	"Alejandro"	The Fame Monster
Lady Gaga	"Monster"	The Fame Monster
Lady Gaga	"So Happy I Could Die"	The Fame Monster
Lady Gaga	"Fashion"	Confessions of a Shopaholic (soundtrack)
Lil Jon	"Give It All U Got" (Feat. Kee or Tinchy Stryder)	Non-album single
Little Boots	"Remedy"	Hands
Pixie Lott	"Here We Go Again"	Turn It Up
Pixie Lott	"Rolling Stone"	Turn It Up
Sean Kingston	"Fire Burning"	Tomorrow
Space Cowboy	"Just Play That Track" (Feat. Natalia Kills)	Digital Rock Star
Space Cowboy	"Falling Down" (Feat. Chelsea from Paradiso Girls)	Digital Rock Star
Space Cowboy	"I Came 2 Party" (Feat. Cinema Bizarre)	Digital Rock Star
Space Cowboy	"Boyfriends Hate Me"	Digital Rock Star
Space Cowboy	"Party Like Animal" (Feat. Kee And Vistoso Bosses)	Digital Rock Star
Space Cowboy	"I'ma Be Alright (Rent Money)"	Digital Rock Star
Varsity	"Zero"	Club De Fans
Various Artists	"Fashion" (Lady Gaga)	Confessions of a Shopaholic Soundtrack
Various Artists	"Calling You" (Kat DeLuna)	Confessions of a Shopaholic Soundtrack
Various Artists	"Unstoppable" (Kat DeLuna)	Confessions of a Shopaholic Soundtrack

=== 2010 ===
Artist	Tracks	Album
Alexandra Burke	"Start Without You" (Feat. Laza Morgan)	Overcome (Deluxe Edition)
Alexandra Burke	"What Happens on the Dancefloor" (Feat. Cobra Starship)	Overcome (Deluxe Edition)
Artists for Haiti	"We Are the World 25 for Haiti"	We Are the World 25 for Haiti
Cassie	"Lets Get Crazy" (Feat. Akon)	Non-album single
Colby O'Donis	"Texting Flirtation"	Non-album single
Enrique Iglesias	"I Like It" (Feat. Pitbull)	Euphoria
Enrique Iglesias	"One Day at a Time" (Feat. Akon)	Euphoria
Enrique Iglesias	"Dirty Dancer" (with Usher)	Euphoria
Enrique Iglesias	"Why Not Me?"	Euphoria
Kat DeLuna	"Party O'Clock"	Inside Out (EU Edition)
Kat DeLuna	"Push Push feat. Akon"	Inside Out (EU Edition)
Kat DeLuna	"Oh Yeah (La La La)" (Feat. Elephant Man)	Inside Out (EU Edition)
Kat DeLuna	"All in My Head"	Inside Out (EU Edition)
Kat DeLuna	"Rock the House"	Inside Out (EU Edition)
Kat DeLuna	"Calling You"	Inside Out (EU Edition)
Kat DeLuna	"Unstoppable" (Feat. Lil Wayne)	Inside Out (EU Edition)
Livvi Franc	"Automatik"	Non-album single
Mary J. Blige	"Whole Lotta Love"	Stronger with Each Tear
Mylène Farmer	"Oui mais... non"	Bleu Noir
Mylène Farmer	"Lonely Lisa"	Bleu Noir
Nicole Scherzinger	"Poison"	Killer Love
Orianthi	"Addicted to Love"	Believe (II)
Quincy Jones	"Sanford and Son" (Feat. T.I., B.o.B, Prince Charlez & Mohombi)	Q Soul Bossa Nostra
Sibel	"The Fall" (Feat. Lazee)	Non-album single
Sugababes	"About a Girl"	Sweet 7
Usher	"Dirty Dancer" (with Enrique Iglesias)	Raymond v. Raymond
Usher	"More"	Raymond v. Raymond

=== 2011 ===
Artist	Tracks	Album
Alexey Vorobyov	"Get You"	Non-album single
Cher	"The Greatest Thing"	Unreleased
Cher Lloyd	"Playa Boi"	Sticks + Stones
Cher Lloyd	"Over the Moon"	Sticks + Stones
Enrique Iglesias	"I Like How It Feels" (Feat. Pitbull & The WAV.s)	Sex and Love
Havana Brown	"We Run The Night"	When the Lights Go Out
Jason Derulo	"Fight for You"	Future History
Jennifer Lopez	"On the Floor" (Feat. Pitbull)	Love?
Jennifer Lopez	"Papi"	Love?
Jennifer Lopez	"Invading My Mind"	Love?
Jennifer Lopez	"Charge Me Up"	Love?
Jean-Roch	"I'm Alright (Feat. Flo Rida & Kat DeLuna)	Music Saved My Life
JLS	"She Makes Me Wanna"	Jukebox
Kat DeLuna	"Muevete Muevete (Ola Ola)"	Inside Out (International Version)
Kat DeLuna	"Can You Love Me"	Inside Out (Japanese Version)
Kelly Rowland	"Down for Whatever" (Feat. The WAV.s)	Here I Am
KMC	"Everybody Jump" (Feat. Jamtech Foundation)	
Lady Gaga	"Judas"	Born This Way
Lady Gaga	"Hair"	Born This Way
Lady Gaga	"Highway Unicorn (Road to Love)"	Born This Way
Lady Gaga	"Scheiße"	Born This Way
Lionel Richie	"All Night Long (2011 Mix)" (Feat. Guy Sebastian)	Non-album single
Love Generation	"Love Generation"	Non-album single
Love Generation	"Dance Alone"	Non-album single
Midnight Red	"One Club at a Time"	One Club At A Time - EP
Midnight Red	"Step by Step“	One Club At A Time - EP
Mohombi	"Bumpy Ride"	MoveMeant (EU Edition)
Mohombi	"Dirty Situation" (Feat. Akon)	MoveMeant (EU Edition)
Mohombi	"Coconut Tree" (Feat. Nicole Scherzinger)	MoveMeant (EU Edition)
Mohombi	"Love in America"	MoveMeant (EU Edition)
Mohombi	"Miss Me" (Feat. Nelly)	MoveMeant (EU Edition)
Mohombi	"Sex Your Body"	MoveMeant (EU Edition)
Mohombi	"Lovin"	MoveMeant (EU Edition)
Mohombi	"Do Me Right"	MoveMeant (EU Edition)
Mohombi	"Match Made in Heaven"	MoveMeant (EU Edition)
Mohombi	"Maraca"	Universe
Nayer	"Suave (Kiss Me)" (Feat. Pitbull & Mohombi)	Non-album single
Nicole Scherzinger	"Poison"	Killer Love
Nicole Scherzinger	"Killer Love"	Killer Love
Nicole Scherzinger	"Say Yes"	Killer Love
Nicole Scherzinger	"Club Banger Nation"	Killer Love
Nicole Scherzinger	"Desperate"	Killer Love
Nicole Scherzinger	"Everybody"	Killer Love
NKOTBSB	"All in My Head"	NKOTBSB
One Direction	"Save You Tonight"	Up All Night
One Direction	"Another World"	Up All Night
Paulina Rubio	"Me Gustas Tanto"	Brava!
Paulina Rubio	"All Around the World"	Brava!
Paulina Rubio	"Heat of the Night"	Brava!
Pitbull	"Rain Over Me" (Feat. Marc Anthony)	Planet Pit
Porcelain Black	"This Is What Rock N’ Roll Looks Like" (Feat. Lil Wayne)	Mannequin Factory
Porcelain Black	"Naughty Naughty"	Mannequin Factory
Porcelain Black	"How Do You Love Someone?"	Mannequin Factory
Taio Cruz	"There She Goes" (Feat. Pitbull)	TY.O

=== 2012 ===
Artist	Tracks	Album
7Lions	"Born 2 Run"	Born 2 Run - EP
7Lions	"Emergency"	Born 2 Run - EP
7Lions	"Taking Over"	Born 2 Run - EP
7Lions	"One More Time"	Born 2 Run - EP
Akon	"Americas Most Wanted"	Stadium
Cali y El Dandee	"No Hay 2 Sin 3 (Gol)" (Feat. David Bisbal)	3 AM
Dive Bella Dive	"Jack the Ripper"	TBD
Dive Bella Dive	"Spend the Night Living"	TBD
Dive Bella Dive	"Animal"	TBD
Far East Movement	"Live My Life" (feat. Justin Bieber)	Dirty Bass
Havana Brown	"City of Darkness"	Non-album single
Havana Brown	"Spread a Little Love"	When The Lights Go Out
Havana Brown	"You'll Be Mine"	When The Lights Go Out
Jean-Roch	"Name of Love" (Feat. Pitbull & Nayer)	Music Saved My Life
Jennifer Lopez	"Dance Again" (Feat. Pitbull)	Dance Again... the Hits
K'naan	"The Sound of My Breaking Heart"	Country, God, or the Girl
Khaled	"C'est La Vie"	C'est La Vie
Khaled	"Hiya Hiya" (Feat. Pitbull)	C'est La Vie
Khaled	"Encore Une Fois"	C'est La Vie
Khaled	"Ana Âacheck"	C'est La Vie
Khaled	"Dima Labess" (Feat. Mazagan)	C'est La Vie
Khaled	"Laila"(Feat. Marwan)	C'est La Vie
Khaled	"Bab Jenna"	C'est La Vie
Khaled	"Wili Wili"	C'est La Vie
Khaled	"Samira"	C'est La Vie
KMC	"Mash Up the Place" (Feat. Jamtech Foundation)	Non-album single
Love Generation	"Just a Little Bit"	Non-album single
Midnight Red	"Body Talk"	Hell Yeah - EP
Midnight Red	"Hell Yeah"	Hell Yeah - EP
Midnight Red	"Rock Star Lover"	Hell Yeah - EP
Mohombi	"The World Is Dancing"	MoveMeant (UK Edition)
Nicki Minaj	"Starships"	Pink Friday: Roman Reloaded
Nicki Minaj	"Pound the Alarm"	Pink Friday: Roman Reloaded
Nicki Minaj	"Whip It "	Pink Friday: Roman Reloaded
Nicki Minaj	"Automatic"	Pink Friday: Roman Reloaded
Paulina Rubio	"Boys Will Be Boys"	Brava! Reload and Bravísima!
Paulina Rubio	"Say the Word"	Brava! Reload and Bravísima!
Paulina Rubio	"Loud"	Brava! Reload and Bravísima!
Porcelain Black	"Swallow My Bullet"	Mannequin Factory
Priyanka Chopra	"In My City" (Feat. will.i.am)	TBA
Rwapa Crew	"Feels So Right" (Feat. Babel)	TBA
Rye Rye	"DNA" (Feat. Porcelain Black)	Go! Pop! Bang!
Ying Yang Twins	"Fist Pump Jump Jump" (Feat. Greg Tecoz)	All Around the World
Zander Bleck	"Temptation"	Monument
Zander Bleck	"City of Light"	Monument
Zander Bleck	"Stormy Seas"	Monument

=== 2013 ===
Artist	Tracks	Album
Ahmed Chawki	"Habibi I Love You" (Feat. Pitbull)	TBD
Austin Mahone	"What About Love"	The Secret
Colette Carr	"Who Do You Think You Are"	Skitszo
Colette Carr	"I Don't Wanna Go"	Skitszo
Colette Carr	"Told You So" (Feat. Porcelain Black)	Skitszo
Colette Carr	"Mes Amis (We Can Party)"	Skitszo
Dizzee Rascal	"Arse Like That" (Feat. Sean Kingston)	The Fifth
Dizzee Rascal	"Heart of a Warrior" (Feat. Teddy Sky)	The Fifth
Dizzee Rascal	"Love This Town" (Feat. Teddy Sky)	The Fifth
Dizzee Rascal	"We Don't Play Around" (Feat. Jessie J)	The Fifth
Havana Brown	"Flashing Lights"	Flashing Lights
Jason Derulo	"Love Before I Die"	Tattoos
Jason Derulo	"Stupid Love"	Tattoos
Jennifer Lopez	"Live It Up" (Feat. Pitbull)	Non-album single
John Mamann	"Laissons Les Rêver"	Love Life
John Mamann	"Love Life"	Love Life
Katia	"Boom Sem Parar" (Feat. Wildboyz)	TBD
Blue	"Sing For Me"	Roulette
Katy Tiz	"Red Cup"	Far Away
Kika	"Guess It's Alright"	Alive
Kika	"Alive"	Alive
Kika	"Can't Feel Love Tonight" (Feat. Andreas Wijk)	Alive
Kika	"Love Life" (Feat. John Mamann)	Alive
KMC	"My Island"	TBD
Marc Anthony	"Vivir Mi Vida" (Versión Pop)	3.0
Midnight Red	"Take Me Home"	Midnight Red - EP
Midnight Red	"Miss Firestarter"	Midnight Red - EP
Midnight Red	"Where Did U Go?"	Midnight Red - EP
Midnight Red	"Nothing Lasts Forever"	Midnight Red - EP
Porcelain Black	"Mannequin Factory"	Mannequin Factory
Porcelain Black	"Mama Forgive Me"	Mannequin Factory
Porcelain Black	"One Woman Army"	Mannequin Factory
Porcelain Black	"Pretty Little Psycho"	Mannequin Factory
Porcelain Black	"Rich Boi"	Mannequin Factory
Priyanka Chopra	"Exotic" (Feat. Pitbull)	TBD
Sean Kingston	"Smoke Signals"	Back 2 Life
The Dolly Rockers	"One More"	Non-album single
Talkback	"Laugh Laugh"	Non-album single
Zander Bleck	"Dirty Love Song"	Monument

=== 2014 ===
Artist	Tracks	Album
Austin Mahone	"Till I Find You"	The Secret
Austin Mahone	"Next to You"	The Secret
Austin Mahone	"Secret"	The Secret
Austin Mahone	"Can't Fight This Love"	The Secret
Austin Mahone	"The One I've Waited For"	The Secret
Austin Mahone	"Shadow (Acoustic)"	The Secret
Chawki	"Come Alive" (Feat. RedOne)	TBD
Chawki	"Time of Our Lives"	TBD
Chawki	"It's My Life" feat. Dr. Alban	TBD
Isac Elliot	"Baby I"	Follow Me
Kenza Farah	"Briser Les Chaines"	KARiSMATIK
Kenza Farah	"Marseille Je T'aime"	KARiSMATIK
Kenza Farah	"Mi Amor"	KARiSMATIK
Kika	"Vai Portugal!"	Non-album single
Magic System	"Magic in the Air" (featuring Chawki)	Africainement Votre
Mohombi	"Movin'" (Feat. Birdman, KMC & Caskey)	Universe
Mohombi	"Maraca"	Universe
Molly Sandén	"Freak"	TBA
Sophia Del Carmen	"Lipstick" (Feat. Pitbull) [Interpolates "A-Ricky-Kee"]	TBA
Wayne Beckford	"Too Many Girls"	TBA
Zander Bleck	"Morning"	Monument

=== 2015–present ===
Year	Artist	Tracks	Album
2015	The Band Perry	"Live Forever"	Non-album single
2015	Emilie Esther	"I N E S C A P A B L E"	R A R E
2015	Ericka Guitron	"Nobody"	TBD
2015	Prince Royce	"Seal It With a Kiss"	Double Vision
2015	Roya	"Lie"	TBD
2015	Skylar Stecker	"Bring Me to Life" (Feat. Kalin and Myles)	This Is Me
2016	Akon	"Warrior"	Bilal soundtrack
2016	Álvaro Soler	"Sofia"	Eterno Agosto
2016	Kaya Stewart	"16 Dollars" (Feat. Brooke Candy)	Kaya Stewart
2016	Kaya Stewart	"Free Fall"	Kaya Stewart
2016	Kaya Stewart	"Gold Digger"	Kaya Stewart
2016	Kaya Stewart	"Need U2B Mine"	Kaya Stewart
2016	Kaya Stewart	"Sleepover"	Kaya Stewart
2016	Kaya Stewart	"So You Care Now"	Kaya Stewart
2016	Kaya Stewart	"With Your Love"	Kaya Stewart
2016	Spencer Ludwig	"Diggy"	TBD
2016	Spencer Ludwig	"Diggy" (Feat. Sofia Reyes) (Spanish Version)	TBD
2016	Roya	"Fighting for 2" (Feat.Maître Gims)	TBD
2017	Marcus & Martinus	"Make You Believe in Love"	Moments
2017	Matt Terry	"Original" (With. RedOne)	Trouble
2017	Samantha J	"Baby Love" (Feat. R. City)	TBD
2017	SonReal	"Repo Man"	One Long Dream
2017	SonReal	"Can I Get A Witness"	One Long Dream
2017	SonReal	"No Warm Up"	One Long Dream
2017	Stanaj	"The Way I Love Her"	TBD
2017	Now United	"Summer In The City"	Non-album single
2018	Now United	"What Are We Waiting For"	Non-album single
2018	Now United	"Who Would Think That Love?"	Non-album single
2018	Now United	"All Day"	Non-album single
2018	Now United	"How We Do It"	Non-album single
2018	Alex Sparrow	"Again and Again"	Non-album single
2018	Álvaro Soler	"La Cintura"	Mar de colores
2018	Faudel	"All Day All Night" (feat. RedOne)	Non-album single
2018	Jordan Smith	"Only Love"	Only Love
2018	Mansionair	"Violet City"	Shadowboxer
2018	RedOne & All stars	#HappyBirthdaySidna	Non-album single
2018	Roya	"Bad"	Non-album single
2018	Sophie Beem	"Glow" (featuring RedOne)	Non-album single
2019	Guru Randhawa	"Slowly Slowly" (Feat. Pitbull)	Non-album single
2019	Sherefa	"Is It Love?"	Non-album single
2020	Ava Max	"Kings & Queens"	Heaven & Hell
2020	Now United	"Better"	Non-album single
2021	LunchMoney Lewis	"Money Dance"	Non-album single
2021	Spencer Ludwig	"Rock The Bottom"	From The Vault
2021	Sirusho	"Let It Out"	Non-album single
2022	Sebastián Yatra	"Ulayeh" (Feat. Nouamane Belaiachi)	Non-album single
2022	Various Artists	"Arhbo" (Ozuna, Maître Gims, RedOne)	FIFA World Cup Qatar 2022 (Official Soundtrack)
2022	Various Artists	"Dreamers" (Jungkook)	FIFA World Cup Qatar 2022 (Official Soundtrack)
2022	Various Artists	"Hayya Hayya (Better Together)" (Trinidad Cardona, Davido, AISHA)	FIFA World Cup Qatar 2022 (Official Soundtrack)
2022	Various Artists	"Light The Sky" (Nora Fateh, Balqees, Rahma Riad, RedOne)	FIFA World Cup Qatar 2022 (Official Soundtrack)
2023	Tones and I	"Bring It On" (feat. Bia and Diarra Sylla)	Non-album single
2023	Bebe Rexha	"It's On"	Non-album single
2024	Enrique Iglesias	"Como Yo"	FINAL (Vol.2)
2024	Carol Doche	"Montego" (feat. Wiz Khalifa)	Non-album single
2025	Lil Wayne	"The Days" (with Bono)	Tha Carter VI

=== Additional production credits ===
- 2006: "Move It (FIFA 2006 RedOne Mix)" (Sophie)
- 2008: "Fashion" (Heidi Montag)
- 2009: "Would If I Could" (recorded by Menudo)
- 2009: "Obvious" (recorded by Menudo)
- 2009: "She's Bad" (recorded by Menudo)
- 2009: "Piece of Me" (recorded by Varsity Fanclub)
- 2010: "007 on You" (co-written by Lady Gaga; recorded by Esmée Denters)
- 2010: "Dance-O-Holic" (recorded by Quincy Jagher)
- 2010: "Fanatik" (recorded by Quincy Jagher)
- 2010: "Summer's Not Hot" (recorded by Selena Gomez & the Scene)
- 2011: "Hypnotico" (recorded by Jennifer Lopez)
- 2011: "Say Jambo" (recorded by Mohombi)
- 2011: "Starships" (Mohombi)
- 2013: "Live Our Life" (recorded by ZO)
- 2013: "Take Me Away" (recorded by Ki Fitzgerald)
- 2013: "Gypsy" (recorded by Lady Gaga)
- 2013: "Merry Christmas, Happy Holidays" (recorded by Midnight Red; NSYNC cover)
- 2014: "It's My Life" (recorded by Ahmed Chawki)
- 2014: "We Are One (Ole Ola)" (recorded by Pitbull, Jennifer Lopez and Claudia Leitte)
- 2014: "Expertease (Ready Set Go)" (recorded by Jennifer Lopez)
- 2015: Whitney (film score)
- 2015: "Hold The Line" (recorded by Rod Stewart)
- 2016: "Angel Down (Work Tape)" (recorded by Lady Gaga)

== Remixes ==
- 2004: Kevin Lyttle - "Turn Me On (Dance-Pop Remix)" (co-produced with Nely)
- 2005: Darin - "Step Up (RedOne Remix)" [featuring Jay-Json]
- 2006: Christina Milian - "L.O.V.E." (RedOne Remix)
- 2006: Shakira - "Hips Don't Lie/Bamboo (2006 World Cup Mix)" [featuring Wyclef Jean]
- 2007: Christina Aguilera - "Candyman (RedOne Ultimix)"
- 2008: Robyn - "Handle Me (RedOne Remix)"
- 2008: New Kids on the Block - "Summertime (RedOne Remix)" [featuring Jadakiss]
- 2008: New Kids on the Block - "Dirty Dancing (RedOne Mix)"
- 2008: The Clique Girlz - "Smile (RedOne Remix)"
- 2008: Lady Gaga - "Just Dance (RedOne Remix)" [featuring Kardinal Offishall]
- 2009: Enrique Iglesias - "Takin' Back My Love (Alternate Mix)" [featuring Sarah Connor]
- 2009: Sugababes - "About A Girl (Radio Mix)"
- 2010: Far East Movement - "Like a G6 (RedOne Remix)" [featuring Mohombi, The Cataracs and Dev]
- 2010: Nicole Scherzinger - "Poison (New Main/Alternate Radio Version)"
- 2010: Usher - "More (RedOne/Jimmy Joker Remix)" / "(RedOne/Jimmy Joker Extended Remix)"
- 2011: 2NE1 - "I Don't Care (RedOne Remix)"
- 2011: Enrique Iglesias - "Dirty Dancer (Single Version)" [with Usher featuring Lil Wayne]
- 2011: Enrique Iglesias - "Dirty Dancer (Remix)" [with Usher featuring Lil Wayne and Nayer]
- 2011: Havana Brown - "We Run the Night (US Radio Edit, Remix)" [featuring Pitbull]
- 2011: Mohombi - "Bumpy Ride (Soca Remix)" [featuring Pitbull and Machel Montano]
- 2013: Emeli Sandé - "My Kind of Love (RedOne and Alex P Remix)"
- 2013: Priyanka Chopra - "Exotic (Alternate Edit)" [featuring Pitbull]
- 2018: Alvaro Soler - "La Cintura (Remix)" [featuring Flo Rida and TINI]
- 2019: Goo Goo Dolls - "Over And Over (RedOne & T.I. Jakke Remix)"
- 2020: Ava Max - "Kings & Queens (Part 2)" [featuring Lauv and Saweetie]

=== Other-language versions ===
- 2007: Kat DeLuna - "Whine Up (Spanish)" [featuring Elephant Man]
- 2007: Kat DeLuna - "Run The Show (Spanish)" [featuring Shaka Dee/Don Omar]
- 2007: Kat DeLuna - "Como Un Sueño (Am I Dreaming's Spanish Version)"
- 2009: Enrique Iglesias - "Sans L'Ombre D'Un Remord (Takin' Back My Love's French Version)" [featuring Tyssem]
- 2011: Jennifer Lopez - "Ven A Bailar (On The Floor's Spanish Version)" [featuring Pitbull]
- 2011: Kat DeLuna - "Move Your Body (English version of "Muevete Muevete")"
- 2011: Mohombi - "Bumpy Ride (French)"
- 2011: Mohombi - "Dirty Situation (French)" [Feat. Akon] "
- 2012: Jennifer Lopez - "Bailar Nada Más (Dance Again's Spanish Version)"
- 2013: Ahmed Chawki - "Habibi I Love You" [featuring {Do(Dutch) / Kenza Farah(French) / Fani Drakopoulou(Greek) / Mandinga(Romanian) / Sophia Del Carmen(Spanish)} and Pitbull] "
- 2014: Chawki - "Notre Moment (Time Of Our Lives's French Version)"
- 2014: Chawki - "C'est Ma Vie (It's My Life's French Version)" [featuring Dr. Alban]
- 2014: Midnight Red - "Take Me Home (Spanglish)"
- 2014: Midnight Red - "Contigo (Take Me Home's Spanish Version)"
- 2014: Mohombi - "Movin' (French)" [featuring Birdman, KMC and Caskey]
- 2014: Mohombi - "Muevelo (Movin' 's Spanglish Version)" [featuring Alexis & Fido, KMC and Birdman]
- 2015: John Mamann - "Love Life (French)" [featuring Kika]
- 2016: RedOne - "Don't You Need Somebody" [featuring Enrique Iglesias, R. City, Aseel and Shaggy]
- 2022: Trinidad Cardona, Davido, AISHA - "Hayya Hayya (Better Together) (Spanish Version)"
