= Mohombi discography =

- Studio albums: 2
- Singles: 14

The discography of Swedish-Congolese R&B singer-songwriter and dancer Mohombi consists of two studio albums and Fourteen singles.

Mohombi collaborated with Swedish rapper Lazee on "Do It", which was released in Sweden on 31 May 2010. It debuted at number nine on the Swedish Singles Chart. In Los Angeles, Mohombi was introduced through friends to producer RedOne, whose own background is Swedish-Moroccan. The singer's debut single, "Bumpy Ride" is the first release on RedOne's label 2101 Records, a joint venture with Universal. It was released in the United States on 24 August 2010. Mohombi released "Miss Me" as his debut single in the United Kingdom on 31 October 2010. It features American rapper Nelly. His third single called "Dirty Situation" was released in Europe on 11 November and features R&B singer Akon. "Dirty Situation" is played at the beginning and then again later on in the middle of the music video for "Miss Me". Mohombi's debut album, MoveMeant was released in Europe Monday 28 February 2011 and was scheduled to be released in the US by the end of 2011. Mohombi features on track "Hula hoop" of the 2011 release of Stella Mwangi album "Kinanda". Mohombi's single, "Coconut Tree" features Nicole Scherzinger.

On 2 September 2011 Mohombi released another single called "Maraca" on iTunes in Sweden. Mohombi also recorded the song "Suave (Kiss Me)" with Pitbull & Nayer. He was nominated for Best Swedish Act at the 2011 European Music Awards in Belfast. This Must Be Pop listed him 7th in their Top 10 of 2012. In 2014, he released "I Need Your Love" with Shaggy, Faydee and Costi.

== Albums ==
Title	Album details	Peak chart positions			
Title	Album details	BEL	FRA	CAN	SWE
MoveMeant	Released: 28 February 2011; Label: 2101, Interscope, Cherrytree, Island; Format: CD, digital download	69	79	34	43
Universe	Released: 16 July 2014; Label: Universal; Format: CD, digital download	—	—	—	—
"—" denotes a title that did not chart, or was not released in that territory.

== Singles ==
=== As lead artist ===
Title	Year	Peak chart positions										Certifications	Album
Title	Year	BEL	CAN	FIN	FRA	NLD	NOR	SWE	ESP	SWI	UK	Certifications	Album
"Bumpy Ride" (solo or featuring Pitbull or Machel Montano)	2010	7	32	2	3	1	3	6	17	41	—	DEN: Platinum; SWE: 2× Platinum	MoveMeant
"Miss Me" (featuring Nelly)	2010	123	—	—	—	—	—	—	—	—	66		MoveMeant
"Dirty Situation" (featuring Akon)	2010	16	94	9	28	67	—	54	—	—	—		MoveMeant
"Coconut Tree" (featuring Nicole Scherzinger)	2011	13	80	—	75	—	9	8	11	—	—	SWE: Platinum	MoveMeant
"Maraca"	2011	—	—	—	—	—	—	14	—	—	—		Universe
"In Your Head"	2012	26 (Ultratip)	—	—	77	—	—	—	31	—	—		MoveMeant
"Movin'" (featuring Birdman, K.M.C. and Caskey)	2014	—	—	—	—	—	—	—	—	—	—		Universe
"Summertime"	2014	—	—	—	—	—	—	—	—	—	—		Universe
"Universe"	2014	—	—	—	—	—	—	—	—	—	—		Universe
"Infinity"	2016	—	—	—	—	—	—	—	—	—	—		Universe
"We On Fire" (featuring D Kullus)	2017	—	—	—	—	—	—	—	—	—	—		Non-album singles
"Radio"	2017	—	—	—	—	—	—	—	—	—	—		Non-album singles
"Mr. Loverman"	2018	—	—	—	—	—	—	—	—	—	—		Non-album singles
"Hello"	2019	—	—	—	—	—	—	3	—	—	—		Melodifestivalen 2019
"Winners"	2020	—	—	—	—	—	—	24	—	—	—		Melodifestivalen 2020
"The One" (with Klara Hammarström)	2020	—	—	—	—	—	—	—	—	—	—		Non-album singles
"Plus Fortes (Mama)"	2020	—	—	—	—	—	—	—	—	—	—		Non-album singles
"Chocola" (featuring Bayanni, Dawda)	2023	—	—	—	—	—	—	—	—	—	—		Non-album singles
"—" denotes items that did not chart or were not released.

=== As featured artist ===
Title	Year	Peak chart positions									Album
Title	Year	AUT	BEL	CAN	FRA	NLD	SWE	ESP	SVK	US	Album
"Do It" (Lazee featuring Mohombi)	2010	41	—	—	—	—	9	—	—	—	Cartes sur Table
"Sexy" (Les Jumo featuring Mohombi)	2011	—	—	—	—	—	—	—	—	—	Cartes sur Table
"Suave (Kiss Me)" (Nayer featuring Mohombi and Pitbull)	2011	—	—	34	49	—	—	—	5	—	Non-album release
"Love 2 Party" (Celia featuring Mohombi)	2012	—	—	—	—	—	—	—	—	—	
"Crazy4u" (Remix) (Karl Wolf featuring Mohombi)	2012	—	—	—	—	—	—	—	—	—	
"Addicted" (DJ Assad featuring Mohombi / Craig David / Greg Parys )	2012	—	—	—	97	—	—	—	—	—	
"I Don't Wanna Party Without You" (PLAYB4CK vs. SuperMartxe featuring Mohombi)	2013	—	—	—	—	—	—	—	—	—	
"I Found A Way" (Werrason featuring Mohombi)	2013	—	—	—	—	—	—	—	—	—	
"I Need Your Love" (Shaggy featuring Mohombi, Faydee, Costi)	2014	—	38 (Ultratip)	74	147	8	—	25	—	66	Non-album release
"Baddest Girl in Town" (Pitbull featuring Wisin and Mohombi)	2015	—	—	—	—	—	—	—	—	—	Dale
"Tatuaje" (Elvis Crespo featuring Mohombi)	2015	—	—	—	—	—	—	—	—	—	
"Hasta Que Salga El Sol" (DJ Chino featuring Mohombi and Farruko)	2015	—	—	—	—	—	—	—	—	—	
"Vive La Vida" (Nicole Cherry featuring Mohombi)	2015	—	—	—	—	—	—	—	—	—	
"Bottoms Up" (Alexandra Joner featuring Mohombi)	2016	—	—	—	—	—	—	—	—	—	
"Pretty Lady" (DJ Valdi featuring Mohombi)	2016	—	—	—	—	—	—	—	—	—	
"Turn Me On" (DJ Polique featuring Mohombi)	2016	—	—	—	—	—	—	—	—	—	
"Balans" (Alexandra Stan featuring Mohombi)	2016	—	—	—	—	—	—	—	—	—	Alesta
"Animals" (Lin C featuring Joey Montana and Mohombi)	2016	—	—	—	—	—	—	—	—	—	
"Let Me Love You" (DJ Rebel and Mohombi featuring Shaggy)	2016	—	—	—	—	—	—	—	—	—	
"Kiss Kiss" (DJ R'AN featuring Mohombi, Willy William and Big Ali)	2016	—	—	—	—	—	—	—	—	—	
"Picky" (Remix) (Joey Montana featuring Akon and Mohombi)	2016	—	—	—	—	—	—	—	—	—	Picky Back to The Roots
"Rockonolo" (Remix) (Lumino featuring Mohombi, Diamond Platnumz and Franko)	2017	—	—	—	—	—	—	—	—	—	
"Se Fue" (Arash featuring Mohombi)	2017	—	—	—	—	—	—	—	—	—	Non-album release
"Another Round" (Nicola Fasano and Alex Guesta featuring Mohombi and Pitbull)	2018	—	—	—	—	—	—	—	—	—	
"Baila" (Aines Christian featuring Mohombi)	2018	—	—	—	—	—	—	—	—	—	
"African Crew: La Magie" (Akuma, Hanane, Jaylann and Mohombi)	2018	—	—	—	—	—	—	—	—	—	
"Claro Que Sí" (Juan Magán featuring Hyenas, Mohombi and Yasiris)	2019	—	—	—	—	—	—	—	—	—	
"Chocola" (Bayanni, Dawda)	2023	—	—	—	—	—	—	—	—	—	
"—" denotes items that did not chart or were not released.

== Guest appearances ==
List of non-single songs with guest appearances by Mohombi
Title	Year	Album	Artist
"Do It"	2010		Lazee
"Like A G6" (Red One Remix)	2010		Far East Movement, Dev, The Cataracs
"She Owns the Night"	2010	Free Wired	Far East Movement
"Sanford and Son"	2010	Q: Soul Bossa Nostra	Quincy Jones, T.I., B.o.B., Prince Charlez
"Hula Hoop"	2011	Kinanda	Stella Mwangi
"Hold Yuh" (Remix)	2012	Pink Friday: Roman Reloaded	Nicki Minaj, Gyptian
"Sun in California"	2012	Global Warming	Pitbull, Playb4ck
"Mi Gente" (Pitbull Worldwide Remix)	2017		J Balvin, Willy William, Pitbull
"Kwangu Njoo"	2018	Money Mondays	Vanessa Mdee
"Come Closer"	2018		Roberto Zambia
"Coconut Lover"	2018	Silver Eller Bly (Plata O Plomo)	Dogge Doggelito, Anthony Sky

=== Writing discography ===
List of written songs, artist, album name and the co-writers
Title	Year	Artist(s)	Album	Co-written with
"Life Speaks to Me"	2021	Basshunter	Non-album single	Basshunter; Mohombi; Lucky Luke; Alexandru Cotoi
