= AJ Junior =

Achraf Janussi (AJ Junior)
- Also known as: AJ Junior, AJ Janussi, A Janussi, AJ Jannusi
- Born: Achraf Janussi
- Occupations: Songwriter, Producer
- Years active: 2002–present

Achraf Janussi, better known as AJ Junior, and also known as AJ Janussi, is a songwriter and music producer based in Sweden. The credits may also use A Janussi, Ashraf Janussi or sometimes Jannusi. He closely cooperates with record producer RedOne and often also with Bilal Hajji.

Janussi wrote hits for the A-Teens in 2002, and co-produced the American singer Vanessa Hudgens's album V in 2006, the German pop group No Angels and the British X Factor winner Shayne Ward's album Breathless in 2007 and co-wrote the song "Tell Him" for Ward. He also technically assisted on 4 tracks in Westlife 2007 album Back Home.

He later on concentrated on songwriting, writing or co-writing many charting hits that appeared on the official charts in many countries. Notable artists include Jennifer Lopez and Pitbull in "On the Floor", "Dance Again" and "Live It Up", as well as for Mohombi, Cher Lloyd, Nicole Scherzinger, Shayne Ward, JLS, Taio Cruz, Khaled, One Direction, Paulina Rubio, Havana Brown and Skitszo. AJ Junior also co-wrote the 2013 qualifying song for Russia by Alexey Vorobyov entitled "Get You".

== Discography ==
(Selective - songs written or co-written)

2002

- A-Teens - "Slam" / "Singled Out"

2006

- Vanessa Hudgens - Whatever Will Be (co-producer)

2007

- No Angels - Destiny (Co-produced album)
- Shayne Ward - Breathless (Co-produced album)
- Westlife - Back Home (Technical credit for 4 tracks)

2008

- Jessi Malay - "Booty Bangs"
- Shayne Ward - "Tell Him"

2009

- Jeanette - "Solitary Rose"

2010

- Alexandra Burke feat. Cobra Starship - "What Happens on the Dancefloor"
- Mohombi - "Bumpy Ride"
- Mohombi feat. Akon - "Dirty Situation"
- Mohombi feat. Nelly - "Miss Me"
- Mohombi feat. Nicole Scherzinger - "Coconut Tree"

2011

- Alex Vorobyov - "Get You" (Eurovision 2011 song for Russia)
- Jennifer Lopez - "Papi" / "Invading My Mind" / "Charge Me Up"
- Jennifer Lopez feat. Pitbull - "On the Floor" / "Ven a bailar (On The Floor)"
- JLS - "She Makes Me Wanna"
- Love Generation - "Dance Alone" (Melodifestivalen 2011)
- Mohombi feat. Nicole Scherzinger - "Coconut Tree"
- Nicole Scherzinger - "Everybody" / "Killer Love" / "Poison"
- Pitbull featuring Marc Anthony - "Rain Over Me"
- Paulina Rubio - "All Around the World" / "Heat of the Night"
- Taio Cruz feat. Pitbull - "There She Goes"

2012

- Cher Lloyd - "Playa Boi" / "Over the Moon"
- Havana Brown feat. R3hab - "You'll Be Mine"
- Havana Brown feat. R3hab & Prophet - "Big Banana"
- Jennifer Lopez feat. Pitbull - "Dance Again"
- Khaled - "C'est la vie" / "Encore une fois"
- One Direction - "Another World" / "Save You Tonight"
- Taio Cruz feat. Pitbull - "There She Goes"

2013

- Jennifer Lopez feat. Pitbull - "Live It Up"
- Colette Carr - "I Don't Wanna Go" / "Told You So" featuring Porcelain Black
