= In Your Head =

2011 single by Mohombi

Single by Mohombi

from the album MoveMeant (UK Edition)
- Released: December 3, 2011
- Recorded: 2011
- Genre: Pop, R&B
- Length: 3:12
- Label: 2101, Island
- Songwriter(s): Dolores O'Riordan, Lucas Secon, Andreas Romdhane, Josef Larossi, Mohombi
- Producer(s): Quiz & Larossi, Lucas Secon

Mohombi singles chronology
"Maraca" (2011)	"In Your Head" (2011)	"Movin'" (2014)

"In Your Head" is a song by Swedish-Congolese singer-songwriter Mohombi. It was released on December 3, 2011 as a digital download in Sweden and it was released worldwide in January 2012. The song's chorus interpolates The Cranberries' "Zombie", as written by Dolores O'Riordan. "In Your Head" was written by Lucas Secon, Quiz & Larossi and Mohombi, and it was produced by Quiz & Larossi & Lucas Secon. The track's video is listed in the library of showcased singles of National Geographic Music India.

== Music video ==
A music video to accompany the release of "In Your Head" was first released onto YouTube on December 2, 2011 and has received over 31 Million views at a total length of three minutes and seventeen seconds. The video was shot in New York City. It is licensed by UMG (on behalf of Universal-Island Records Ltd.).

== Track listing ==
Digital download
No.	Title	Length
1.	"In Your Head"	3:12
2.	"In Your Head (ft. Sway & Ice Prince) (TJM Remix)"	3:48
3.	"In Your Head (CASSETTi Remix)"	5:01
4.	"In Your Head (High Level Club Mix)"	6:28

== Charts ==
=== Weekly charts ===
Chart (2011–12)	Peak position
Belgium (Ultratip Bubbling Under Flanders)	26
Belgium (Ultratip Bubbling Under Wallonia)	9
Czech Republic (Rádio – Top 100)	42
France (SNEP)	77
Hungary (Rádiós Top 40)	2
Spain (Airplay Chart)	31

=== Year-end charts ===
Chart (2012)	Position
Hungary (Rádiós Top 40)	14

== Release history ==
Region	Date	Format	Label
Spain	November 30, 2011	Digital download	2101 Records, Island Records
Belgium	December 3, 2011	Digital download	2101 Records, Island Records
Sweden	December 3, 2011	Digital download	2101 Records, Island Records
United Kingdom	February 15, 2012	Digital download	2101 Records, Island Records
