= It's All About You (EP) =

EP by Rebecca F. & The Memes
- Released: 2006
- Recorded: c. 2006
- Genre: Pop/rock

It's All About You is a four-song EP written and produced by singer, songwriter, and Chicago musician Rebecca F.

Rebecca F.'s interest in the meme — "an idea, behavior, or style that spreads from person to person within a culture" — led to the band name "Rebecca F. & The Memes." In a 2006 interview, she said: "A meme is a cultural gene. [W]e humans by consensus determine what cultural information is valuable enough to pass from one generation to the next. The question is: What memes are we passing on in the modern world?"

From 2000 to 2002 Rebecca F. was contracted to a development deal by R. Kelly for his vanity label Rockland Records during which time she recorded and produced her own songs.

== Track listing ==
No.	Title	Length
1.	"Under the Big White Star"	4:43
2.	"Juda"	2:47
3.	"Derek"	4:12
4.	"The Girl"	5:20

== "Judas" plagiarism lawsuit ==
The song "Juda", released on this album, was written by Rebecca F. and copyrighted in 1999.

=== Lady Gaga and "Judas" ===
In August 2011, Rebecca F., born Rebecca Francescatti, filed a lawsuit in Illinois Northern District Court's Chicago Office known as Francescatti v. Germanotta et al. The complaint alleges: "Lady Gaga, her music labels, and one of the musicians who allegedly wrote 17 of Gaga's songs for her Born This Way album are sued for copyright infringement, accused by Chicago composer and performing artist Rebecca Francescatti of using her 1999 copyright-protected work "Juda" in Gaga's 'Judas', purportedly via defendant Gaynor."

Brian Joseph Gaynor, a member of DJ White Shadow, LLC, "collaborated with Lady Gaga in writing and producing 17 of 20 songs recorded" on "Born This Way." Gaynor was the recording engineer and mixer for Rebecca F.'s album "It's All About You," which included the song "Juda."

=== "Judas" and Jennifer Lopez's "Invading My Mind" ===
Francescatti's law team entered evidence in December 2012 that Gaga used an additional unlicensed sample in "Judas" and then incorporated it into "Invading My Mind". They claimed that Lady Gaga asked Jennifer Lopez for a credit on "Invading My Mind" to "cover her tracks", suggesting that she did not even contribute to the song.

Francescatti's team claimed to "uncover text messages between Gaga and RedOne proving that she had stolen the sample loop used in both 'Judas' and 'Invading My Mind'".

=== Summary judgment ===
In June 2014, Federal Judge Marvin Aspen (b. 1934) dismissed the lawsuit without trial through an award of Summary Judgment for lacking "ordinary observer" qualities:

The differences [between the two songs] so outweigh the purported similarities between the melodies that they cannot be said to be even remotely similar ... We agree with Defendants that the songs do not have common lyrics, the themes are different, and they do not sound at all alike musically ... Thus, we find the similarity of expression to be, quite clearly, ‘totally lacking.’ The (two songs) are so utterly dissimilar that reasonable minds could not differ as to a lack of substantial similarity between them.

Judge Aspen ruled for the Plaintiff (Francescatti) that a reasonable juror could find that Germanotta had access to Francescatti's work. The judge described this "channel of communication" between the parties as a "nexus". He concludes that bassist Brian Gaynor worked on Francescatti's song before collaborating with Lady Gaga:

Although the parties dispute that Gaynor ever came into direct contact with Gaga, it is undisputed that Gaynor worked on the Francescatti Song ["Juda"] before he collaborated with Blair on material for Gaga's Born This Way album and that Gaynor and Blair received credit for contributions to the same album.

Therefore Judge Aspen denied Germanotta et al.'s argument that there was no access between the parties.

Judge Aspen concluded that certain elements of the Plaintiff's song that were alleged and argued to be points of infringement actually constituted evidence that Lady Gaga independently created Judas. Judge Aspen wrote:

Even if the expressions were similar, they are not protectable. First, the title of the Francescatti Song is not protectable. ...The word "Juda" is found in 243 song titles, and the word "Judas" is found in 2,139 song titles ... Moreover, the evidence suggests independent creation. ... The title "Juda" reflects Francescatti's relationship with an acquaintance and the betrayal of her father whereas "Judas" was inspired by Gaga's feelings toward a former boyfriend... Second, repetition of the songs' respective titles in the lyrics is unprotectable. ... ("Repetition is ubiquitous in popular music.") ... Many musicians have repeated a title lyric, and in particular "Juda" and "Judas," in songs that predate the two songs at issue here. ... In fact, Gaga herself on prior occasions has repeated her titles in her lyrics [e.g. in Alejandro, Poker Face and Bad Romance ]. ... Where an allegedly copied element of a work appears in the defendant's prior works, the presumption is that the defendant copied that element from herself, not the plaintiff.... Repetition of the titles in the songs' lyrics is therefore an unoriginal, unprotectable element."

=== Responses to dismissal ===
One of the attorneys for Lady Gaga made the following statement:

Lady Gaga and her team are pleased that the court concluded, after a thorough analysis, that the lawsuit lacked any basis in law or fact."

In a statement following Judge Aspen's ruling, Francescatti said her plight had been a "David versus Goliath struggle".

Though I’m disappointed, I’m proud that I stood up for federally protected rights as a songwriter. Unfortunately this particular judge did not agree with my position. ... Throughout history, it’s been very difficult for individuals to go up against corporations and corporate interests. However I remain firm in my belief that I was correct to exercise my right to copyright protection afforded me in this fine country.

Rolling Stone music writer Daniel Kreps observed:

Whenever music copycat cases like this land in the courtroom, it's extremely rare for the judge to side with the plagiarized party.

== Lady Gaga sues Rebecca F. for $1.4 million ==
In September 2014 Lady Gaga filed court documents to collect $1.4 million from Rebecca Francescatti (Rebecca F.). The singer "claim[s] back close to $1.4 million that she paid her lawyers over the course of the three year case" and "has requested Rebecca foot the staggering bill."

Rebecca F.'s response to the lawsuit, "Why You Should Care that Lady Gaga is Suing Me for $1.4 Million Dollars" elucidates her copyright infringement allegations for the first time. In November 2014 she was forced to remove the essay from her website.

== Harassment ==
Harassment of the "Juda" songwriter has been ongoing since August 2011. In response, Rebecca F. wrote and posted the YouTube single "I Don't Believe In Monsters" featuring snapshots of bullying comments, including death threats.

In an interview for her four-song self-released EP "It's All About You," F. said:

"Looking around, I sometimes feel like our current culture is built on exclusion. One group of people is "cool" or "hot" precisely because it does not include another group of people. Needless to say, I think that since we're all humans, we belong in the same group. I like the idea of inclusion, so maybe that's what you're hearing in the lyrics.
