= Jada (group) =

American female vocal group

- Jada singing the national anthem at a Boston Celtics game. From left to right: April Forrest, Elle Wine, Jacyn Tremblay and Lauren O'Keefe

Background information
- Origin: Boston, Massachusetts, U.S.
- Genres: Pop; R&B
- Years active: 2002–2012
- Label: Universal Motown
- Past members: Lauren O'Keefe; Jacyn Tremblay; April Forrest; Elle Wine
- Website: jadamusic.com

Jada were an American pop and R&B female vocal group from Boston, Massachusetts. They are known for their mix of pop, soul, dance, and R&B styling, and their gospel-inspired harmonies. Jada was signed by Universal Motown Records president Sylvia Rhone in October 2006. Jada won "Outstanding Pop/R&B Music Act of the Year" at the 2008 Boston Music Awards. Jada is managed by Laura Poulin Management/ Bristol Entertainment. Through Universal Motown, Jada released their first major label single, "American Cowboy" (written and produced by Akon and RedOne) in the spring of 2009. This was followed by their second major label single, "Break Up Song" (written and produced by Wayne Wilkins, Andrew Frampton, and Savan Kotecha) in the fall of 2009. Jada's song "Model That" was featured on the November 17, 2009, episode of the MTV television show The City. "American Cowboy" was featured on the Fox drama House on Monday, April 27, 2009. They released a song and music video for "This Party's on Fire" (written and produced by Rio, video directed by Vassili Shields) on October 4, 2011. Their most recent EP, named Supersonique, was released on January 24, 2011, and included 5 songs with 2 remixes, including "Supersonique", "This Party's on Fire", "Mercy Killing", "Can't Let Go", and "Goodbye".

== Life and career ==
=== Early years ===
In January 2006, Jada worked in New York with Grammy-nominated producer/songwriter Toby Gad (Fergie, Beyoncé, Natasha Bedingfield). Jada worked with Gad to co-write the ballad, "Is It Love". Jada traveled to studios all over the country, from New York City and Atlanta to Miami and Los Angeles, collaborating with such superstars as RedOne, Akon, Danja, Wyclef Jean, Swizz Beatz and J.R. Rotem. They also worked with Jordan Omley from production/songwriting team The Jam (production team) (Leona Lewis, Jennifer Hudson, Jordin Sparks) yielded "The Problem with Love", "If You Wanna" (written by Ryan Tedder of OneRepublic)" and the inspirational "Hold On". An alliance with UK team Wayne Wilkins, Andrew Frampton, and Savan Kotecha (Natasha Bedingfield, Carrie Underwood) resulted in the mid tempo "Break Up Song" and club track "Play a Playa", while New York City hit-makers Sturken & Rodgers (Christina Aguilera, Rihanna) contributed the ballad, "Shattered". Later, "Can't Let Go" was co-written by Jada and Ric Poulin. In 2006, the group signed to Universal Motown.

Their song "I'm That Chick" (produced by JR Rotem) was featured on the Bring It On: In It to Win It mini soundtrack in late 2007. In February 2008, Jada appeared with R&B singer JoJo at the Ultimate Prom event. In 2008, the writing team, The Clutch and producer Danja, wrote and produced a song with Jada called "Denial", which they performed live on NECN.

Jada won "Outstanding Pop/R&B Music Act of the Year" at the 2008 Boston Music Awards. The Boston Phoenix official dispatch from the 2008 Boston Music Awards said of Jada, "Being that they're signed to Motown, these local divas had some hype to live up to. And they did; homegirls look hotter in person than in press shots (one even has a little Jess Alba thing going on), and, unlike manufactured hoaxes like Destiny's Child, every last one of them can belt and grind."

In 2008, Jada worked with producer RedOne (Lady Gaga, Brandy) at Jada's homebase, Bristol Recording Studios in Boston. The sessions yielded "Model That" and the group's debut single, "American Cowboy" (co-written and produced by Akon), which was released to iTunes on March 31. Jada toured many Top 40 radio stations across the country promoting their song and video release of "American Cowboy". The video was directed by Ray Kay (Lady Gaga) and released on April 25. Jada's second single, the mid-tempo "Break Up Song", written and produced by Wayne Wilkins, Andrew Frampton, and Savan Kotecha, was released to Top 40 Radio, iTunes and Amazon.com in September 2009. The same creative team wrote and produced Jada's song "Model That", which was featured on the MTV television show The City on November 17, 2009. Some of the popular Top 40 Radio Stations across the country visited by Jada during their tours for "American Cowboy" and "Break Up Song" include KIIS LA (Los Angeles, CA), WXKS KISS 108 (Boston, MA), WKSE (Buffalo, NY), WBHT (Wilkes-Barre, PA), WIOQ Q102 (Philadelphia, PA), WKCI KC101.3 (New Haven, CT), KWNZ 93.7 (Reno, NV), and WWHT Hot 107 (Syracuse, NY).

=== Recent ===
In 2010, Jada performed at the National Association for Campus Activities (NACA) in the northeast convention in Philadelphia and in the west convention in Los Angeles. Their song "This Party's on Fire" recently played on the Top 40 radio station, KISS 108 Boston. Jada also sang the national anthem for various sporting events, such as the 2010 NBA Playoffs for the Boston Celtics first playoff game at the TD Garden, and at the HBO Welterweight Boxing Championship at Madison Square Garden in New York. Jada also performed at the Boston Nightlife Awards and the annual Faneuil Hall Tree Lighting Ceremony.

Jada's "American Cowboy" aired on the Fox sitcom, House on Monday, April 27, 2010. Jada also performed at the nationally televised wedding of Cynthia Bailey and Peter Thomas of the Bravo TV show Real Housewives of Atlanta in season 3.

In 2011, Jada was celebrity judges at the Hard Rock Cafe Battle of the Bands representing the non-profit organization, Music Drives Us Foundation, led by Ernie Boch Jr.

In May 2011, Jada performed at the 2011 New England Urban Music Awards.

In June 2011, Jada performed live on television for Fox Providence's "The Rhode Show".

In October 2011, Jada launched a new single and music video for their new song "This Party's on Fire".

In January 2012, Jada launched a five-song EP called Supersonique, with the songs "Supersonique, This Party's on Fire", "Mercy Killing", "Can't Let Go", "Goodbye", a remix of "This Party's on Fire", a remix of "Mercy Killing".

In November 2012, Jada released the song "Stop My Heart" on Jay Dabhi's The WeekEND album as part of Soltrenz Records/ Strictly Rhythm.

Jacyn currently performs throughout New England in several bands on the Wilson Stevens Agency, produces Muse: A Salute to Divas, and is a featured vocalist with notable orchestras like Boston Pops, New England Philharmonic, Merrimack Valley Symphony, Hillyer Festival Orchestra and more.

April is now recording her EP "Electric Love" and is set to debut at the House of Blues in Los Angeles April 17, 2015. She released her single "Believe" on March 6, 2015, to iTunes. April released her first album "Electric Love" to iTunes and several other music outlets on March 5, 2017. April now sings with Northeastern Country Band Sage and Whiskey.

== Artistry ==
=== Musical style and influences ===
Jada is known for their mix of pop music, soul, dance, and R&B styling, and their gospel-inspired harmonies. Each singer has her own individual style, such as Jacyn's tastes of pop and rock from Pink (singer) to Paramore, April's hip-hop and urban sound and fashion from T.I. and Timbaland, Lauren's suburban Philadelphia influences in neo-soul legends like Jill Scott and Musiq Soulchild, and Elle's unique style from Rascal Flatts and John Legend to Lady Gaga.

=== Performances ===
Jada has performed at numerous fairs, festivals, parks, concerts, colleges and televised events across the country. Jada has shared the stage with The Black Eyed Peas, Ciara, Akon, Sean Kingston, Boyz II Men, JoJo, Ashanti, Flo Rida, All American Rejects, Plain White T's, Jesse McCartney, Soulja Boy, Hall and Oates, Susan Tedeschi, The Rascals and others. Jada has toured with Simon Mall (Simon Property Group) D'Tour Live, Radio Disney Summer Concert Series, National Radio Concert Tour Spring/Summer 09 including WXKS-FM (KISS 108 FM) Concert at the Comcast Center Boston, WBHT Concert, WKSZ Concert, WKGS KISS 106.7 Concert and more. Jada has performed the national anthem at Gillette Stadium for the New England Patriots, at Fenway Park for the Boston Red Sox, at The TD Garden for the Boston Celtics NBA Playoffs for the 2008, 2009, and 2010 seasons, for the Boston Bruins at The TD Garden, and at the 2010 HBO Welterweight Boxing Championship at Madison Square Garden. Other live performances include: Teen Vogue and Seventeen Magazine events, Disney Pleasure Island, Six Flags, Hersheypark, Hard Rock Cafe, Day of the Child Concert at Santa Monica Airport, Radio Disney, the 2010 Boston Nightlife Awards, Boston Music Awards, Miami Winter Music Conference, the Viper Room at John Garabedian "Open House Party" at the 47th Annual Grammy Awards, the National Association for Campus Activities (NACA), and Bravo's (Bravo (US TV channel)) Real Housewives of Atlanta (season 3).

== Media appearances ==
- Fox (Fox Broadcasting Company) television show, House (TV Series)

Jada's debut single "American Cowboy" (written and produced by Akon and RedOne) was featured on the April 27, 2010, episode of the Fox (Fox Broadcasting Company)television show "House (TV Series)" in Season 5 Episode 22 'House Divided'. Scene appears 30 minutes into the episode: http://www.fox.com/house/recaps/season-5/episode-22.htm

- MTV television show, The City (MTV series)

"Model That" was featured on the November 17, 2009, episode of the MTV television show "The City (MTV series)" in Season 1 Episode 121 'Forget About Boys': http://www.mtv.com/shows/the-city/season_1/episode.jhtml?episodeID=161303

- John Garabedian "Open House Party"

Jada performed for John Garabedian "Open House Party" in The Viper Room at the 47th Annual Grammy Awards: http://www.bristolstudios.com/news/summer05.html

- Other Top 40 radio station interviews and appearances include:

East: WXKS KISS108 (Boston, MA), WFHN (New Bedford, MA), WKCI (New Haven, CT), WFLY (Albany, NY), WKKF (Albany, NY), WWHT (Syracuse, NY), WPXY (Rochester, NY), WKGS (Rochester, NY), WKSE (Buffalo, NY), WBHT (Wilkes-Barre, PA), WKRZ (Wilkes-Barre, PA), WHKF (Harrisburg, PA), and WSTW (Wilmington, DE)

West: KIIS (Los Angeles, CA), KDND (Sacramento, CA), KSXY (Santa Rosa, CA), KWYL 102.9 (Reno, NV), KHOP 95.1 (Modesto, CA), KWNZ 93.7 (Reno, NV), KHTS (San Diego, CA), KZZP (Phoenix, AZ), KRQQ (Tucson, AZ), KSME (Denver, CO), KKMG (Denver, CO), KVUU (Denver, CO), KPTT (Denver, CO), KONN (Denver, CO), KZHT (Salt Lake City, UT), KYMV (Salt Lake City, UT), and KUDD (Salt Lake City, UT)

South: WFLZ (Tampa, FL), WXXL (Orlando, FL), WBVD (Melbourne, FL), WHYI (Miami, FL), WPOW (Miami, FL), WBZW (Pittsburgh, PA), WKST (Pittsburgh, PA), WAKS (Independence, OH), WNCI (Columbus, OH), WDJX (Louisville, KY), and WZKF (Louisville, KY).

== Non-profit organization affiliations ==
Jada was the first Ambassador for Ernie Boch Jr.'s, Music Drives Us Foundation. Jada has made many appearances as part of this foundation, such as guest judges at the 2010 and 2011 Hard Rock Cafe Battle of the Bands.

== Discography ==
=== Singles ===
- 2007: I'm that Chick (produced by JR Rotem, soundtrack movie, Bring It On: In It to Win It)
- 2009: American Cowboy, (produced by Akon, RedOne, soundtrack for television show, "House (TV Series) Season 5 Episode 22 'House Divided'")
- 2009: Break Up Song (produced by Wayne Wilkins, Andrew Frampton, Savan Kotecha)
- 2011: This Party's on Fire (produced by RIO)
- 2012: Supersonique (produced by RIO, written by Jada and RIO)
- 2012: Mercy Killing (produced by RIO)
- 2012: Can't Let Go (produced by RIO)
- 2012: Goodbye (produced by RIO)

=== Other songs ===
- 2008: Is It Love (produced by Toby Gad and Jada)
- 2008: Denial (produced by Danja)
- 2008: Girl Just Do Your Thing (produced by Toby Gad and Jada)
- 2008: If You Wanna (produced by Ryan Tedder)
- 2008: Kiss and Tell (produced by The Insomniax)
- 2009: Play a Playa (produced by Wayne Wilkins, Andrew Frampton, Savan Kotecha)
- 2009: Shattered (produced by Sturken & Rodgers)
- 2009: Model That (produced by Danja)
- 2009: The Problem with Love (produced by Jordan Omley from The Jam)

== Music videos ==
| Year | Song | Director |
|---|---|---|
| 2009 | American Cowboy | Ray Kay |
| 2011 | This Party's On Fire | Vassili Shields |

== Awards ==
| Year | Presenter | Awards | Result |
|---|---|---|---|
| 2008 | Boston Music Awards | Outstanding Pop/R&B Act Of The Year | Won |
