= Rain Over Me =

2011 single by Pitbull

Single by Pitbull featuring Marc Anthony

from the album Planet Pit
- Released: June 8, 2011
- Recorded: 2010
- Studio: Henson Recording, Los Angeles; Al Burna, Miami, Florida
- Genre: Dance-pop; Eurodance
- Length: 3:51
- Label: Polo Grounds; J; Mr. 305
- Songwriters: Armando C. Perez; RedOne; Marc Anthony; Bilal "The Chef" Hajji; AJ Janussi; Rachid "Rush" Aziz
- Producers: RedOne; Rush; Jimmy Joker

Pitbull singles chronology
"Boomerang" (2011)	"Rain Over Me" (2011)	"Suave (Kiss Me)" (2011)

Marc Anthony singles chronology
"La Fuerza del Destino" (2011)	"Rain over Me" (2011)	"Cautivo de Este Amor" (2012)

Music video
- "Rain Over Me" on YouTube

Audio sample
- file; help

"Rain Over Me" is a song by Cuban-American rapper Pitbull from his sixth studio album, Planet Pit. It features vocals from Puerto Rican-American singer Marc Anthony. Both artists also co-wrote it, alongside RedOne, Bilal "The Chef" Hajji, AJ Janussi and Rachid "Rush" Aziz. It was also produced by RedOne, Rush and Jimmy Joker. It was released on June 10, 2011, as the third promotional single from the album and received a full release as the album's third official single on June 8, 2011.

It charted at number 30 on the US Billboard Hot 100. The song also became Pitbull's second number one single on the Billboard Hot Latin Songs chart as well his first number-one single on the Tropical Songs. In addition, it is Marc Anthony's sixth number-one single on the Hot Latin Songs and twentieth number-one single on the Tropical Songs, reclaiming his position as having the artist with the most number-one Tropical Songs chart after a two-year tie with Víctor Manuelle. The music video was directed by David Rosseau, who also directed a previous Pitbull single, "I Know You Want Me (Calle Ocho)" in 2009. The song is featured on the dance rhythm game, Just Dance 2020.

== Background and composition ==
"Rain Over Me" is a dance song produced by RedOne, David Rush and Jimmy Joker. It contains dramatic "disco-rave" synths. According to Robert Copsey of Digital Spy the song is "a step outside his [Pitbull's] usual robotic sound. Bill Lamb of About.com noted that both Pitbull and Marc Anthony are of Latin Caribbean descent, referring to the song as a "superstar Latin Caribbean duet".

This song also marks the second collaboration between the two artists, following their guest appearances on their 2010 single Armada Latina alongside hip hop group Crypress Hill.

== Music video ==
The music video was released onto Pitbull's official Vevo channel on July 22, 2011. The video was directed by David Rousseau. It features both Pitbull and Marc Anthony in the desert along with actress Natalie Martinez, with many water effects.

On April 13, 2020, the video surpassed the 1 billion views mark, thus making it in the first 200 YouTube videos to reach this milestone. This is the third and second video to accomplish this feat for Pitbull and Marc Anthony in that order respectively.

== Track listing ==
- Digital download
1. "Rain Over Me" (featuring Marc Anthony) – 3:51
- German maxi CD single
1. "Rain Over Me" (Album Version) (featuring Marc Anthony)
- Other remixes
1. "Rain Over Me" (Benny Benassi Remix) – 5:16
2. "Rain Over Me" (Jorge Duran Remix) – 2:53
3. "Rain Over Me" (Laidback Luke Remix) — 6:15

== Credits and personnel ==
- Pitbull – songwriter, vocals
- RedOne – songwriter, producer, instruments, programming and vocal editing
- Marc Anthony – songwriter, lead vocals and backing vocals
- Bilal "The Chef" Hajji – songwriter
- AJ Janussi – songwriter, vocal editing and recording
- Rachid "Rush" Aziz – songwriter producer, instruments and programming
- Jimmy Joker – producer, instruments and programming
- Trevor Muzzy – vocal editing, recording and mixing
- Al Burna – Pitbull vocal recording
- Tom Coyne – mastering

Credits adapted from Planet Pit album liner notes.

== Charts ==
=== Weekly charts ===
Chart (2011)	Peak position
Australia (ARIA)	9
Austria (Ö3 Austria Top 40)	5
Belgium (Ultratop 50 Flanders)	8
Belgium (Ultratop 50 Wallonia)	2
Bulgaria (IFPI)	2
Canada Hot 100 (Billboard)	7
Canada CHR/Top 40 (Billboard)	13
Czech Republic Airplay (ČNS IFPI)	4
Denmark (Tracklisten)	2
Finland (Suomen virallinen lista)	2
France (SNEP)	2
Germany (GfK)	7
Global Dance Tracks (Billboard)	5
Greece Digital Songs (Billboard)	4
Hungary (Rádiós Top 40)	2
Hungary (Dance Top 40)	2
Iceland (Lagalistinn)	27
Ireland (IRMA)	16
Israel (Media Forest)	6
Italy (FIMI)	20
Lebanon (The Official Lebanese Top 20)	3
Luxembourg (Billboard)	6
Mexico (Billboard Mexican Airplay)	6
Mexico Anglo (Monitor Latino)	5
Netherlands (Dutch Top 40)	16
Netherlands (Single Top 100)	17
New Zealand (Recorded Music NZ)	7
Norway (VG-lista)	2
Poland (Polish Airplay TV)	1
Poland Dance (ZPAV)	1
Romania (Romanian Top 100)	1
Romania TV Airplay (Media Forest)	1
Russia Airplay (TopHit)	4
Scotland Singles (Official Charts)	20
Slovakia Airplay (ČNS IFPI)	1
Spain (Promusicae)	1
Spanish Airplay Chart (Promusicae)	3
Sweden (Sverigetopplistan)	12
Switzerland (Schweizer Hitparade)	3
Switzerland (Media Control Romandy)	1
UK Singles (Official Charts)	28
Ukraine Airplay (TopHit)	13
US Billboard Hot 100	30
US Hot Latin Songs (Billboard)	1
US Pop Airplay (Billboard)	20
US Hot Rap Songs (Billboard)	25
US Rhythmic Airplay (Billboard)	20

Chart (2012)	Peak position
Spain Airplay (Promusicae)	33

2025–2026 weekly chart performance for "Rain Over Me"
Chart (2025–2026)	Peak position
Lithuania (AGATA)	13
Poland (Polish Streaming Top 100)	100

=== Year-end charts ===
Chart (2011)	Position
Australia (ARIA)	62
Austria (Ö3 Austria Top 40)	36
Belgium (Ultratop Flanders)	65
Belgium (Ultratop Wallonia)	51
Canada (Canadian Hot 100)	56
France (SNEP)	10
Germany (Official German Charts)	63
Greece (IFPI)	79
Hungary (Dance Top 40)	24
Hungary (Rádiós Top 40)	29
Netherlands (Dutch Top 40)	97
Polish Dance Singles Chart	18
Romanian Top 100	22
Russia Airplay (TopHit)	78
Spain (PROMUSICAE)	8
Sweden (Sverigetopplistan)	61
Switzerland (Schweizer Hitparade)	15
Ukraine Airplay (TopHit)	75
US Hot Latin Songs (Billboard)	37

Chart (2012)	Position
Hungary (Dance Top 40)	76
Poland (ZPAV)	26
Spain (PROMUSICAE)	39

== Certifications ==
Region	Certification	Certified units/sales
Australia (ARIA)	2× Platinum	140,000^{^}
Austria (IFPI Austria)	Gold	15,000^{*}
Belgium (BRMA)	Gold	15,000^{*}
Canada (Music Canada)	2× Platinum	160,000^{*}
Denmark (IFPI Danmark)	Gold	15,000^{^}
Finland (Musiikkituottajat)	Gold	7,920
Germany (BVMI)	Gold	150,000^{^}
Italy (FIMI)	Platinum	30,000^{‡}
Mexico (AMPROFON)	2× Platinum	120,000^{*}
New Zealand (RMNZ)	Platinum	15,000^{*}
Norway (IFPI Norway)	5× Platinum	50,000^{*}
Spain (Promusicae)	Platinum	40,000^{*}
Sweden (GLF)	2× Platinum	80,000^{‡}
Switzerland (IFPI Switzerland)	2× Platinum	60,000^{^}
United Kingdom (BPI)	Silver	200,000^{‡}
United States (RIAA)	2× Platinum	2,000,000^{‡}
Streaming
Denmark (IFPI Danmark)	Platinum	900,000^{†}
^{*} Sales figures based on certification alone.^{^} Shipments figures based on certification alone.^{‡} Sales+streaming figures based on certification alone.^{†} Streaming-only figures based on certification alone.

== Release history ==
Country	Date	Format
United States	June 10, 2011	Digital download — promotional single
Australia	July 4, 2011	Contemporary hit radio
United States	July 19, 2011	Mainstream radio airplay
France	September 5, 2011	CD single
Germany	October 21, 2011	CD single

== See also ==
- List of number-one Billboard Top Latin Songs of 2011
- List of number-one Billboard Hot Tropical Songs of 2011
- List of Romanian Top 100 number ones of the 2010s
