= Dirty Situation =

2010 single by Akon and Mohombi

Single by Mohombi featuring Akon

from the album MoveMeant
- Released: November 22, 2010
- Genre: Dancehall
- Length: 3:39
- Label: Island Records
- Songwriter(s): RedOne, AJ Junior, Mohombi, Bilal "The Chef"
- Producer(s): RedOne

Mohombi singles chronology
"Miss Me" (2010)	"Dirty Situation" (2010)	"Coconut Tree" (2011)

"Dirty Situation" is a song by Swedish-Congolese singer-songwriter Mohombi featuring vocals from Senegalese American R&B recording artist and songwriter Akon from his debut album MoveMeant. It was released on November 22, 2010 as a Digital download in Sweden. The song was written by RedOne, AJ Junior, Mohombi, Bilal "The Chef" and was produced by RedOne. It peaked to number 54 on the Swedish Singles Chart.

== Music video ==
A music video to accompany the release of "Dirty Situation" was first released onto YouTube on December 9, 2010 at a total length of four minutes and twenty-five seconds.

== Track listing ==
Digital download
No.	Title	Length
1.	"Dirty Situation"	3:39

== Chart performance ==
Chart (2011)	Peak position
Belgium (Ultratop 50 Flanders)	16
Belgium (Ultratop 50 Wallonia)	26
Canada (Canadian Hot 100)	94
Finland (Suomen virallinen lista)	9
France (SNEP)	28
Netherlands (Single Top 100)	67
Sweden (Sverigetopplistan)	54

== Release history ==
Region	Date	Format	Label
Spain	November 19, 2010	Digital download	Island Records
Sweden	November 22, 2010	Digital download	Island Records
