= MoveMeant =

Studio album by Mohombi
- Released: 28 February 2011
- Recorded: 2010
- Studio: Cosmos, Stockholm, Sweden; FC Walvisch, Amsterdam, Netherlands; AIR, London, UK; Henson, Hollywood, California
- Genre: Electro-Pop
- Length: 37:08
- Label: 2101; Universal
- Producer: RedOne (also exec.); BeatGeek; Jimmy Joker; Giorgio Tuinfort; KNOCDOWN; Polow da Don

Mohombi chronology
MoveMeant (2011)	Universe (2014)

Singles from MoveMeant
- 1. "Bumpy Ride" Released: 24 August 2010; 2. "Miss Me" Released: 31 October 2010; 3. "Dirty Situation" Released: 11 November 2010; 4. "Coconut Tree" Released: 4 April 2011; 5. "In Your Head" Released: 15 February 2012

MoveMeant is the debut studio album by Swedish-Congolese R&B recording artist Mohombi. It was released on 28 February 2011 on RedOne's joint venture with Universal, 2101 Records. It was preceded by the lead single, "Bumpy Ride" on 24 August 2010. Mohombi has described the sound of the album as R&B music with African influences.

== Track listing ==
No.	Title	Writer(s)	Producer(s)	Length
1.	"Bumpy Ride"	Nadir Khayat; Bilal "The Chef" Hajji; Achraf "AJ Junior" Jannusi; Ilya Salmanzadeh	RedOne	3:46
2.	"Dirty Situation" (featuring Akon)	Khayat; Hajji; Jannusi; Salmanzadeh	RedOne	3:40
3.	"Coconut Tree" (featuring Nicole Scherzinger)	Khayat; BeatGeek; Hajji; Jannusi; Salmanzadeh	RedOne; BeatGeek; Jimmy Joker	3:38
4.	"Love in America"	Khayat; Hajji; Jannusi; Giorgio Tuinfort; Kinda "Kee" Hamid; Mohombi	RedOne; Giorgio Tuinfort	4:42
5.	"Miss Me" (featuring Nelly)	Khayat; Mohombi Moupondo; Cornell Haynes, Jr.; Salmanzadeh	RedOne; KNOCDOWN (co.)	3:21
6.	"Sex Your Body"	Khayat; Polow da Don; Jannusi; Hajji; Martin Kierszenbaum; Mohombi	RedOne; Polow da Don	3:58
7.	"Say Jambo"	Jimmy Joker; Jannusi; Hajji; Mohombi	RedOne; BeatGeek	3:14
8.	"Lovin'"	Khayat; Jimmy Joker; Mohombi	RedOne; Jimmy Joker	3:20
9.	"Do Me Right"	Khayat; Jannusi; Mohombi	RedOne	3:10
10.	"Match Made in Heaven"	Khayat; Tuinfort; Hamid; Mohombi	RedOne; Giorgio Tuinfort	4:19

French bonus tracks
No.	Title	Writer(s)	Producer(s)	Length
11.	"Bumpy Ride" (french version)	Khayat; Hajji; Jannusi; Salmanzadeh	RedOne	3:45
12.	"Dirty Situation" (french version)	Khayat; Hajji; Jannusi; Salmanzadeh	RedOne	3:40
13.	"Bumpy Ride" (featuring Pitbull)	Khayat; Hajji; Jannusi; Salmanzadeh	RedOne	3:45

UK edition
No.	Title	Writer(s)	Producer(s)	Length
1.	"In Your Head"	Dolores O'Riordan; Lucas Secon; Andreas Romdhane, Josef Larossi; Mohombi	Lucas Secon; Quiz & Larossi	3:12
2.	"Bumpy Ride" (featuring Pitbull)	RedOne; Bilal "The Chef" Hajji; Achraf "AJ Junior" Jannusi; Mohombi	RedOne	3:46
3.	"Dirty Situation" (featuring Akon)	Khayat; Hajji; Jannusi; Mohombi	RedOne	3:40
4.	"Coconut Tree" (featuring Nicole Scherzinger)	RedOne; BeatGeek; Jimmy Joker; Hajji; Jannusi	RedOne; BeatGeek (co.); Jimmy Joker (co.)	3:38
5.	"Love in America"	RedOne; Hajji; Jannusi; Giorgio Tuinfort; Kinnda "Kee" Hamid; Mohombi	RedOne; Giorgio Tuinfort	4:42
6.	"Miss Me" (featuring Nelly)	RedOne; Mohombi; Cornell Haynes, Jr.; Ilya Salmanzadeh	RedOne; KNOCDOWN (co.)	3:21
7.	"Sex Your Body"	RedOne; Polow da Don; Jannusi; Hajji; Martin Kierszenbaum; Mohombi	RedOne; Polow da Don	3:58
8.	"Say Jambo"	Jimmy Joker; Jannusi; Hajji; Mohombi	Jimmy Joker; BeatGeek (co.)	3:14
9.	"Lovin'"	RedOne; Jimmy Joker; Mohombi	RedOne; Jimmy Joker	3:20
10.	"Do Me Right"	RedOne; Jannusi; Mohombi	RedOne	3:10
11.	"Match Made in Heaven"	RedOne; Tuinfort; Hamid; Mohombi	RedOne; Giorgio Tuinfort	4:19
12.	"The World Is Dancing"	RedOne; BeatGeek; Hajji; Jannusi; Mohombi	RedOne	4:03
13.	"The Power of the Cocktail" (featuring Machel Montano)	Santiago Rodriguez; Ivar Lisinski; Bruno Lopez; Mohombi	Ivar Lisinski; Bruno Lopez; Mohombi	3:27

== Personnel ==
Credits adapted from the liner notes of MoveMeant.

- RedOne – engineer (tracks 1–4, 6–9), vocal arrangement (tracks 1, 2, 4, 6–10), vocal editing (tracks 1–4, 6–8), background vocals (tracks 1, 2, 4, 6)
- Mohombi – vocal arrangement (track 5), background vocals (tracks 1, 2, 4–7, 10)
- AJ Junior – engineer (tracks 5, 7–9), vocal editing (tracks 5, 7), background vocals (tracks 4, 6, 7)
- Bilal "The Chef" Hajji – background vocals (tracks 4, 6, 7)
- Jimmy Joker – background vocals (track 7)
- Kinnda "Kee" Hamid – background vocals (track 10)
- Giorgio Tuinfort – vocal arrangement, vocal editing, piano (track 10)
- Trevor Muzzy – engineer (tracks 1–3, 5, 6, 8, 10), vocal editing (tracks 1–3, 5–8)
- BeatGeek – engineer (track 7)
- Johnny Powers – vocal editing (track 9)
- Robert Orton – mixing (tracks 1–9)
- Rutger "Rutti" Kroese – mixing (track 10)
- Amit and Naroop – photography

== Charts ==
Chart performance for MoveMeant
Chart (2011)	Peak position
Belgian Albums (Ultratop Flanders)	69
Canadian Albums (Nielsen SoundScan)	34
French Albums (SNEP)	79
Japanese Albums (Oricon)	20
Swedish Albums (Sverigetopplistan)	43

== Certifications ==
Certifications for MoveMeant
Region	Certification	Certified units/sales
Denmark (IFPI Danmark)	Gold	10,000^{‡}
Sweden (GLF)	Gold	20,000^{‡}
^{‡} Sales+streaming figures based on certification alone.

== Release history ==
Release history for MoveMeant
Region	Date	Label	Ref.
Spain	25 February 2011	Universal Music	
France	28 February 2011	Universal Music	
Denmark	28 March 2011	Universal Music	
Netherlands	1 April 2011	Universal Music	
Canada	23 May 2011	Universal Music	
Japan	27 July 2011	Universal Music	
United Kingdom	6 April 2012	Universal Music	
