= Coconut Tree (song) =

2011 single by Mohombi

Single by Mohombi featuring Nicole Scherzinger

from the album MoveMeant
- Released: April 15, 2011
- Length: 3:38
- Label: Island
- Songwriters: Mohombi; RedOne; Bilal "The Chef"; AJ Junior; BeatGeek; Jimmy Thörnfeldt as Jimmy Joker
- Producer: RedOne

Mohombi singles chronology
"Dirty Situation" (2010)	"Coconut Tree" (2011)	"Suave" (2011)

Nicole Scherzinger singles chronology
"Don't Hold Your Breath" (2011)	"Coconut Tree" (2011)	"Right There" (2011)

Music video
- "Coconut Tree" on YouTube

"Coconut Tree" is a song by Swedish-Congolese singer-songwriter Mohombi from his debut album MoveMeant, and featuring vocals from American singer Nicole Scherzinger. It was released on April 15, 2011, as a digital download in Sweden. The song was written by RedOne, AJ Junior, Mohombi, Bilal "The Chef", Jimmy Joker, and Beatgeek and was produced by RedOne. It peaked at number 8 on the Swedish Singles Chart.

== Music video ==
A music video to accompany the release of "Coconut Tree" was first released onto YouTube on May 31, 2011, and the video is directed by Director X.

== Track listing ==
- Digital download
1. "Coconut Tree" – 3:38

== Chart performance ==
=== Weekly charts ===
Chart (2011–12)	Peak position
Belgium (Ultratop 50 Flanders)	13
Belgium (Ultratip Bubbling Under Wallonia)	2
Canada Hot 100 (Billboard)	80
France (SNEP)	75
Greece Digital Songs (Billboard)	6
Norway (VG-lista)	9
Romania (Romanian Top 100)	25
Slovakia Airplay (ČNS IFPI)	17
Spain (Promusicae)	11
Sweden (Sverigetopplistan)	8

=== Year-end charts ===
Chart (2011)	Position
Belgium (Ultratop Flanders)	60
Sweden (Sverigetopplistan)	28

== Certifications ==
Region	Certification	Certified units/sales
Sweden (GLF)	Platinum	40,000^{‡}
^{‡} Sales+streaming figures based on certification alone.

== Release history ==
Region	Date	Format	Label
Spain	April 15, 2011	Digital download	Island Records
Sweden	April 15, 2011	Digital download	Island Records
