= Miss Me (Mohombi song) =

2010 single by Nelly and Mohombi

Single by Mohombi featuring Nelly

from the album MoveMeant
- Released: 28 October 2010
- Genre: Pop, R&B
- Length: 3:21
- Label: Island Records
- Songwriters: Nadir Khayat, AJ Junior, Cornell Haynes, Ilya, Mohombi
- Producers: RedOne, Ilya

Mohombi singles chronology
"Bumpy Ride" (2010)	"Miss Me" (2010)	"Dirty Situation" (2010)

"Miss Me" is a song by Swedish-Congolese singer-songwriter Mohombi featuring vocals from Grammy Award-winning American recording artist, actor and entrepreneur Nelly from his debut album MoveMeant. It was released on 28 October 2010 as a Digital download in the United Kingdom. RedOne, AJ Junior, Mohombi, Ilya, Cornell Haynes Jr. and was produced by RedOne. It peaked at number 66 on the UK Singles Chart.

== Music video ==
A music video to accompany the release of "Miss Me" was first released onto YouTube on 1 February 2011 at a total length of four minutes and sixteen seconds.

== Track listing ==
Digital download
No.	Title	Length
1.	"Miss Me" (feat. Nelly)	3:21
2.	"Miss Me" (Future Freakz Remix)	5:49
3.	"Miss Me" (Wizzy Wow Remix)	3:09
4.	"Miss Me" (Future Freakz Edit)	2:46

== Chart performance ==
Chart (2010)	Peak position
UK Singles (The Official Charts Company)	66

== Release history ==
Region	Date	Format	Label
United Kingdom	28 October 2010	Digital download	Island Records
