= Name of Love (Jean-Roch song) =

Single by Jean-Roch featuring Pitbull and Nayer

from the album Music Saved My Life
- Released: February 10, 2012
- Genre: Electro house; dance-pop
- Length: 3:25
- Label: John-Roch Records
- Songwriter(s): Jean-Roch Pedri; RedOne; John Mamann; Armando C. Perez; Jean Claude Sindres; Bilal "The Chef" Hajji; Teddy Sky; Yohan Simon
- Producer(s): RedOne

Jean-Roch singles chronology
"I'm Alright" (2011)	"Name of Love" (2012)

Pitbull singles chronology
"Rock the Boat" (2011)	"Name of Love" (2012)	"I Like (The Remix)" (2012)

Nayer singles chronology
"Suave (Kiss Me)" (2011)	"Name of Love" (2012)	"Mi Cuerpo / My Body" (2015)

Music video
- "Name of Love" on YouTube

Audio sample
- "Name Of Love": file; help

"Name of Love" is a song by French DJ Jean-Roch with vocals by Cuban-American artists Pitbull and Nayer. It was released on February 10, 2012 on the label named "John-Roch Records". This song was produced by RedOne.

== Music video ==
The music video was released onto Jean-Roch's official VEVO channel on March 25, 2012. It features Jean-Roch, Pitbull and Nayer on a boat.

The video has received over 700.000 views.

== Track listing ==
Digital download

1. "Name of Love" (Original Version) – 3:25

== Credits and personnel ==
- Jean-Roch – producer, songwriter, vocals
- Armando C. Perez – vocals, songwriter
- Nayer - vocals
- RedOne - producer
- John Mamann - songwriter
- Jean Claude Sindre - songwriter
- Yohan Simon - songwriter
- Teddy Sky - songwriter
