= Suave (Kiss Me) =

Single by Nayer featuring Mohombi and Pitbull
- Released: August 2, 2011
- Genre: Dance-pop
- Length: 3:42
- Label: Mr. 305; 2101
- Songwriters: Elvis Crespo; Nadir Khayat; Bilal Hajji; Achraf Jannusi; Armando Pérez; Teddy Sky; Jimmy Joker
- Producers: RedOne; Jimmy Joker

Nayer singles chronology
"Dirty Dancer (Remix)" (2011)	"Suave (Kiss Me)" (2011)	"Name of Love" (2012)

Mohombi singles chronology
"Coconut Tree" (2011)	"Suave (Kiss Me)" (2011)	"Maraca" (2011)

Pitbull singles chronology
"Rain Over Me" (2011)	"Suave (Kiss Me)" (2011)	"Pass at Me" (2011)

Music video
- "Suave (Kiss Me)" on YouTube

"Suave (Kiss Me)" is a song by American singer Nayer featuring Swedish-Congolese singer-songwriter Mohombi and American rapper Pitbull. It was released on August 2, 2011 by Mr. 305 and 2101 Records (Universal Music). Produced by RedOne and Jimmy Joker, the song interpolates elements from the 1998 Elvis Crespo song "Suavemente". It follows Pitbull's Billboard Hot 100 number-one single, "Give Me Everything" which featured additional vocals by Nayer. The song has charted at number 34 on the Canadian Hot 100.

== Music video ==
The official music video was released onto Nayer's official VEVO channel on October 31, 2011.

It features Nayer in black dress, with Mohombi, in a white dress, with Pitbull. It also features an island themed style, and with Mohombi in sleeveless shirts, Nayer in a black catsuit, and Pitbull in white suit. It also features some scenes in black and white. A cave scene was filmed at the end, with Nayer and Mohombi dancing in it.

As of June 2020, the video has received over 53 million views.

== Track listing ==
- Digital download
1. "Suave (Kiss Me)" – 3:42

== Charts ==
Chart (2011)	Peak position
Belgium (Ultratip Bubbling Under Wallonia)	27
Canada (Canadian Hot 100)	34
France (SNEP)	49
Romania (Romanian Top 100)	22
Slovakia (IFPI)	5

== Release history ==
Region	Date	Format	Label
Spain	August 2, 2011	Digital download	Mr. 305, 2101 Records
United States	August 2, 2011	Digital download	Mr. 305, 2101 Records
United Kingdom	August 2, 2011	Digital download	Mr. 305, 2101 Records
