= Invading My Mind =

Song by Jennifer Lopez

from the album Love?
- Released: April 29, 2011
- Studio: Cove Studios (New York City, NY); Henson Recording Studios (Los Angeles, CA)
- Genre: Dance
- Length: 3:20
- Label: Island
- Songwriters: RedOne; AJ Junior; BeatGeek; Teddy Sky; Bilal "The Chef"; Jimmy Joker
- Producers: RedOne; Jennifer Lopez; Lady Gaga; BeatGeek; Jimmy Joker; Kuk Harrell

Audio video
- "Invading My Mind" on YouTube

"Invading My Mind" is a song recorded by American entertainer Jennifer Lopez for her seventh studio album Love? (2011). It was written by RedOne, AJ Junior, BeatGeek, Teddy Sky, Bilal "The Chef", Jimmy Joker and produced by RedOne, Lopez, Lady Gaga, BeatGeek, Jimmy Joker and Kuk Harrell. "Invading My Mind" is an uptempo song that speaks of being overcome with a feeling that's "attacking, invading my mind".

"Invading My Mind" received generally positive reviews from music critics, who thought of the song to be single-worthy. The song drew comparisons to Ace of Base's 1995 single "Beautiful Life" and to the music of Kylie Minogue. It additionally was compared to Lopez's own single "On the Floor", but with "more of a groove feel". Upon the release of Love?, "Invading My Mind" debuted at number ten on the South Korea Gaon International Chart.

== Production and composition ==
"Invading My Mind" (2011)
A twenty second sample of "Invading My Mind", a dance song that has been compared to the music of Kylie Minogue.

"Invading My Mind" was written by RedOne, AJ Junior, BeatGeek, Teddy Sky, Bilal The Chef, Jimmy Joker and produced by RedOne, Lopez, Lady Gaga, BeatGeek and Joker. Lopez's vocals for the song were arranged and produced by RedOne. The vocals were recorded by Jim Annunziato, Josh Gudwin and Kuk Harrell at Cove Studios in New York City, New York and Henson Recording Studios in Los Angeles, California. RedOne, Chris "Tek" O'Ryan and Trevor Muzzy handled audio engineering of "Invading My Mind", while RedOne and O'Ryan were in charge of vocal editing. RedOne, BeatGeek and Joker provided instruments for the song and also programming for them. The song was later mixed by Trevor Muzzy.

"Invading My Mind" is an uptempo song, with a length of three minutes and twenty seconds (3:20). Melinda Newman of HitFix described "Invading My Mind" as being a "fast-paced, Euro-tinged, robotic dance thumper", while Swagata Panjari of Radio and Music called it a "groovy club banger" with "high energy beats". The song contains an almost "duplicate rhythm" to "On the Floor", but with "more prominent" electro keys and breaks that have "more of a groove feel" to them. The song received comparisons to Ace of Base's 1995 single "Beautiful Life" and to the music of Kylie Minogue. While working with RedOne, Lopez insists that he "brought the best out of her", something she credits to his Moroccan, Swedish and American heritage. Lopez stated that: "He's awesome. He's one of the nicest people and has a beautiful spirit. He can create something the whole world will love and that is probably to do with his international background. Some people can do dance, others can do urban or pop, but Nadir does it all and understand what makes a hit on every level".

== Critical response ==
"Invading My Mind" received generally positive reviews from music critics. Tim Stack of Entertainment Weekly awarded the song a B+ rating, stating that: "Remember when the thought of Jennifer Lopez releasing good music was as likely as a sequel to Angel Eyes? Well, our bad. The American Idol judge shot up the charts with the cheesetastic Ibiza chant 'On the Floor'. Now she unites with Gaga pal RedOne for this appropriately named piece of pop pleasure: Once the club banger hits your ears, good or bad, you won't be able to get it out of your head." Tanner Stransky, also of Entertainment Weekly, gave a positive review of the song, stating that between "On the Floor" and "Invading My Mind" Lopez is "really made a glittery return to her extreme club/'Waiting for Tonight' roots". She continued by stating: "Sure, '[Invading My] Mind' may be shallower than the kiddie pool, but this one is up from the first second... and never goes down".

Monica Herrera from Billboard stated that on "Invading My Mind" RedOne and Lady Gaga bring the "hit potential", while Lopez "brings the heat". She continued by stating that the song is an "irresistible '80s euphoria and release". Digital Spy's Robert Copsey, who although stated that the song isn't anything "we haven't heard before," it is worthy of a standalone release. Shane Phoenix of Hot Spots disagreed, stating that "the lyrics are a little repetitive to be a feature single", but it could, however, be a "great follow up to 'On the Floor' if you want to listen back to back and keep dancing". Sal Cinquemani of Slant Magazine said that "Lopez shines" on the Love? album cuts which clock at and above 120 bpm, except for what he said was the "throwaway" song "Invading My Mind". Cinquemani mockingly called the song's lyrics "poetry", referring to the line: "freezing cold, steaming hot, sweaty drip, drip, drop".

== Plagiarism allegations ==
In August 2011, Rebecca Francescatti, a Chicago-based singer, filed a lawsuit against Lady Gaga claiming that she had plagiarized elements of her 1999 recording "Juda" (from Francescatti's album It's All About You) for Gaga's 2011 single "Judas". Francescatti noted that the similarities of the two songs could stem from the fact that her former bass player, Brian Gaynor, was now working for a company who wrote several tracks for Gaga's second album Born This Way (2011). A year later, Francescatti's lawyer claimed in that Gaga used an additional unlicensed sample in "Judas" and then incorporated it into "Invading My Mind". It was alleged that Gaga asked Lopez for a credit on "Invading My Mind" to "cover her tracks", with Francescatti's lawyer claiming that she did not even contribute to the song. The lawsuit claimed to have uncovered text messages between Gaga and RedOne proving that she had stolen the sample loop used in both "Judas" and "Invading My Mind".

== Credits and personnel ==
Credits adapted from the liner notes of Love?.

- RedOne – Vocal arrangement, vocal editor, instruments, instruments programmer, record producer, vocal producer, recording engineer
- Teddy Sky – Backing vocals
- Chris "Tek" O'Ryan – Vocal editor, recording engineer
- Kuk Harrell – Vocal editor, vocal producer, vocal recording engineer
- BeatGeek – Instruments, instruments programmer, record producer
- Jimmy Joker – Instruments, instruments programmer, record producer
- Trevor Muzzy – Mixing, recording engineer
- Jennifer Lopez – Record producer, vocals
- Lady Gaga – Record producer, vocals
- Jim Annunziato – Vocal recording engineer
- Josh Gudwin – Vocal recording engineer

== Charts ==
Chart (2011)	Peak position
South Korea (Gaon International Digital Chart)	43
