= Laila Aziz =

Dutch fashion designer (born 1981)

Laïla Aziz
- Born: 1 May 1981 (age 45); Netherlands
- Occupation: Fashion designer
- Years active: 2009–present
- Label: Kayat
- Spouse: RedOne (m. 2009)
- Website: kayatdesign.com

Laïla Aziz (born 1 May 1981) is a Dutch fashion designer. She is the founder and creative designer of the fashion brand Kayat based in Los Angeles.

== Biography ==
Laïla Aziz was born and raised in the Netherlands to a Moroccan family. She studied law, and then married the Moroccan record producer, singer and songwriter RedOne in 2009. The couple moved to New York City where Aziz took a one year course in fashion and started working as a stylist.

Aziz launched the fashion brand Kayat in Los Angeles in 2008. Her collections were featured in Vogue's 2018 "Autumn/Winter Ready-To-Wear" collection. Kayat's Summer-Spring collection was included in 2020 Arab Fashion Week.
