= Universe (Mohombi album) =

Album by Mohombi

Studio album by Mohombi
- Released: 2014
- Genre: R&B, dancehall, reggae fusion
- Label: Universal Music

Mohombi chronology
MoveMeant (2011)	Universe (2014)

Singles from Universe
- 1. "Maraca" Released: 2 September 2011; 2. "Movin'" Released: 2 June 2014; 3. "Summertime" Released: 2 June 2014; 4. "Universe" Released: 15 October 2014

Universe is the second studio album of Swedish singer Mohombi, released in 2014, on Universal Music, following his debut album, MoveMeant, released in 2011. The first single, "Maraca", was released on 2 September 2011. The second single, "Movin'", featuring Birdman, Caskey and KMC, was released on 2 June 2014.

== Release ==
The song "Maraca" was written by RedOne, Mohombi, Teddy Sky and Jimmy Joker, and it was produced by RedOne, Sky and Joker. It was released on 2 September 2011 as a digital download in Sweden. It has peaked to number fourteen on the Swedish Singles Chart.

Another single, "Movin'", features Birdman, Caskey from Cash Money Records, and KMC. The song is produced by RedOne and was released on 2 June 2014. Birdman wrote the introduction for the song, Caskey wrote the third rap verse and KMC wrote the melody section. The music video for the song was released on 6 June 2014 on Mohombi official account. It features the lead artist and the guests on the TV.

The remix of "Movin'" features Puerto Rican duo Alexis & Fido instead of Caskey, and released as "Muevelo", the official Spanglish remix of the single. The remix was released on 23 October 2014.

== Track listing ==
No.	Title	Length
1.	"Movin'" (featuring Birdman, Caskey and KMC)	3:21
2.	"Just Like That"	3:10
3.	"Universe"	3:49
4.	"Save Me"	3:46
5.	"Turn It Up"	3:28
6.	"Lose It" (featuring Big Ali)	3:12
7.	"Real Love"	3:08
8.	"Dreamers"	3:38
9.	"The Sound" (featuring Didrick)	3:24
10.	"Summertime"	3:16
11.	"Grow Old With You" (featuring Geneva)	3:46
12.	"End of the Day"	3:03
13.	"Maraca"	3:41

== Charts ==
=== Weekly charts ===
Chart (2011)	Peak position
Sweden (Sverigetopplistan)	14

=== Year-end charts ===
Chart (2011)	Position
Sweden (Sverigetopplistan)	94
