= Bilal Hajji =

- Also known as: The Chef, Bilal "The Chef" Hajji
- Born: Bilal Hajji
- Occupations: Songwriter, Producer
- Years active: 2005–present

Bilal Hajji, sometimes also known as The Chef (at times Bilal "The Chef" or Bilal "The Chef" Hajji) is a Moroccan-Swedish songwriter and record producer. Based in Sweden, of Moroccan origin, he has worked with many worldwide artists and celebrities, such as Jennifer Lopez, Lady Gaga, Pitbull, Enrique Iglesias, Akon, One Direction, Nicki Minaj, Nicole Scherzinger, and Maher Zain. He has written or co-written many charting hits on the music charts in many International countries. His early success came through co-writing songs for Alexandra Burke, Lady Gaga, Sean Kingston, Kat DeLuna and Swedish acts Darin Zanyar and Mohombi. He achieved recognition for his work in 2005, firstly with the Darin song "Step Up", which reached No. 1 in Sweden and later won him both a Swedish Grammy and Scandinavian Song of the Year award.

Later hits written or co-written by him include songs for Jennifer Lopez, Pitbull, Enrique Iglesias, Nicole Scherzinger, Akon, One Direction, Nicki Minaj, Khaled amongst others.

== Discography ==
=== Albums ===
(Selective - significant involvement in album)

- 2005: Darin - Darin
- 2007: RBD - Hecho En España
- 2009: Maher Zain - Thank You Allah
- 2011: Mohombi - MoveMeant
- 2011: Paulina Rubio - Brava!
- 2011: Porcelain Black - Mannequin Factory

=== Singles / Songs ===
(selective - written or co-written)

2005

- Darin - "Step Up" / "Move" / "Be What You Wanna Be" / "You Don't Hear Me"

2007

- RBD - "Wanna Play" / "Cariño mio"

2008

- Darin feat. Kat DeLuna - "Breathing Your Love"
- Lady Gaga - "Money Honey"

2009

- Alexandra Burke - "Broken Heels" / "Dumb" / "The Silence"
- Backstreet Boys - "Straight Through My Heart"
- Cassie feat. Akon - "Let's Get Crazy"
- Lil Jon feat. Kee - "Give It All U Got"
- Maher Zain - "Always Be There"
- Pixie Lott - "Rolling Stone"
- Sean Kingston - "Fire Burning"

2010

- Alexandra Burke feat. Cobra Starship - "What Happens On The Dancefloor"
- Kat DeLuna - "Oh Yeah (La La La)" / "Party O'Clock"
- Mohombi - "Bumpy Ride"
- Mohombi feat. Akon - "Dirty Situation"
- Usher - "More" (Remix)

2011

- Alex Vorobyov - "Get You" (Eurovision 2011 song for Russia)
- Cher Lloyd - "Over The Moon" / "Playa Boi"
- Enrique Iglesias feat. Pitbull and The WAV.s - "I Like How It Feels"
- Jennifer Lopez - "Invading My Mind" / "On the Floor" / "Ven a bailar (On The Floor)" / "Papi"
- Kelly Rowland feat. The WAV.s - "Down for Whatever"
- Love Generation - "Dance Alone" (Melodifestivalen 2011)
- Melissa Nkonda - "I Dance Alone" - "Mes aventures"
- Mohombi feat. Nicole Scherzinger - "Coconut Tree"
- Mohombi feat. Pitbull - "Bumpy Ride"
- Nayer feat. Mohombi & Pitbull - "Suave (Kiss Me)"
- Nicole Scherzinger - "Club Banger Nation" / "Everybody" / "Killer Love" / "Poison"
- One Direction - "Another World" / "Save You Tonight"
- Pitbull feat. Marc Anthony - "Rain Over Me"
- Porcelain Black feat. Lil Wayne - "This Is What Rock n' Roll Looks Like" - "Naughty Naughty"
- Taio Cruz feat. Pitbull - "There She Goes"

2012

- Darin - "Nobody Knows"
- Dimitri Vegas & Like Mike & The WAV.s feat. Kelis - "Tomorrow Changed Today (Tomorrowland Anthem 2012)"
- Far*East Movement feat. Justin Bieber - "Live My Life"
- Havana Brown feat. R3hab - "You'll Be Mine"
- Havana Brown feat. R3hab & Prophet - "Big Banana"
- Jean-Roch feat. Pitbull & Nayer - "Name of Love"
- Jennifer Lopez feat. Pitbull - "Dance Again"
- Khaled - "C'est la vie" / "Encore une fois" / "Ana âacheck" / "Bab jenna" / "Samira" etc....
- Khaled feat. Pitbull - "Hya hya"
- Love Generation - "Just a Little Bit" (Melodifestivalen 2012)
- Maher Zain - "Number One For Me"
- Nicki Minaj - "Pound the Alarm" / "Starships" / "Whip It"
- Paulina Rubio - "Boys Will Be Boys"
- Pitbull feat. Enrique Iglesias & Afrojack - "I Like"

2013

- Austin Mahone - "What About Love"
- Jennifer Lopez feat. Pitbull - "Live It Up"
- Marc Anthony - "Vivir Mi Vida"
- Colette Carr - "I Don't Wanna Go"
- Colette Carr feat. Porcelain Black - "Told You So"

2015

- Pitbull feat. Gente de Zona - "Piensas"

2020

- Khaled feat. Gashi - "Delali"
- Basshunter - "Angels Ain't Listening"
