= Lazee =

- Born: Mawuli Kulego; October 22, 1985 (age 40)
- Origin: Malmö, Sweden
- Genre: Hip hop
- Occupations: Rapper; singer
- Years active: 2005 – present
- Label: Timeless Music

Mawuli Kulego (better known by his stage name Lazee) is a Swedish rapper from the Malmö suburb Lindängen.

== Biography ==
Lazee was born in Malmö, Sweden, to parents of Ghanaian origin. His passion for music grew at a young age and he was heavily influenced by the musical tastes of his father who was a DJ. He introduced Lazee to soul, R&B and reggae. Lazee first became interested in Hip Hop when he was seven years old and wrote his first rhyme at the age of ten.

Just before 13th birthday his mother sent him to England where she believed he could "be someone". He attended Elliott School in Putney, Greater London. Whilst still a teenager at school heard the song "Players Anthem" by The Notorious B.I.G. and describes it as a "turning point" in his life. Together with Marcus Nzaku Curtis he started writing lyrics and rap battling with other students. continued to listen to Hip Hop and began work on his first mixtape until he eventually moved back to Sweden in 2004, where he attended John Bauergymnasiet High School in his native Malmö.

== Career ==
He released his first major work as a mixtape entitled It Is What It Is with the help of New York DJ Kayslay; the mixtape was a free sample given to 5000 members of the Swedish urban underground from which Lazee gained critical acclaim and notoriety. The mixtape included tracks like "Top Notch" and "Bigga *****" and there are two music videos for the tracks as well. Things became serious for in 2007 when he moved to Stockholm and began working with producer iSHi. The collaboration gave birth to debut single "Rock Away" on his new label 2Stripes and major label Sony BMG which was released across Scandinavia in 2008. The single was met with high regard across Scandinavia and wider Europe with some critics giving it 9/10. Since then has released several critically acclaimed songs including "Drop Bombs", "Pusherman, featuring Swedish rapper J-Son" and his current hit single "Hold On" featuring Neverstore, a Swedish punk rock band and the song has been a featured single on UK radio stations including Radio 1 and Kiss100 receiving listeners choice selects and ranking highly in song request tables.

== Discography ==
=== Albums ===
- 2008: Setting Standards
- 2011: Supposed II Happen

=== Mixtapes ===
- 2006: It Is What It Is
- 2008: Back for the 1st Time
- 2009: First Class Five Stars
- 2009: First Class Five Stars Season 2
- 2011: One Way Ticket

=== Compilations ===
- 2011: Global Attack Mixtape, Vol. 2

=== Singles ===
- 2009: "Hold On" (feat. Neverstore) (#46 United Kingdom)
- 2010: "Just Like That" (feat. Danny Saucedo)
- 2010: "Do It" (feat. Mohombi)
- 2010: "Young n Restless" (feat. Eric Turner and Adam Tensta)
- 2010: "Calling Out" (feat. Apollo Drive)
- 2011: "Gotta Go"
- 2011: "Do It"
- 2011: "TAG" (feat. Madcon and Julimar) (Remixes)

=== Guest appearances ===
- 2009: "Gå Loss" (Kartellen feat. Lazee, Adam Tensta, J-Son, Glaciuz, Eboi and Mofo the Maverick)
- 2009: "Creamy Girls" (Mathieu Sanders feat. Lazee and Anonis)
- 2010: "Stronger" (Lazee feat. Dead by April)
- 2012: "Shake That Ass" (Danny Saucedo feat. Lazee)
- 2017: "Get Lit" (DJ Cruze feat. Mawuli and Idrise)
