= Bumpy Ride =

Single by Mohombi

from the album MoveMeant
- Released: 24 August 2010
- Recorded: Cosmos Studios, Stockholm, Sweden
- Genre: Soca; dancehall; reggae fusion, Electropop
- Length: 3:44
- Label: 2101; Cherrytree; Interscope; Island
- Songwriters: Nadir Khayat; Bilal Hajji; Achraf Jannusi; Ilya Salmanzadeh; Mohombi Moupondo
- Producer: RedOne

Mohombi singles chronology
"Bumpy Ride" (2010)	"Miss Me" (2010)

Music video
- "Bumpy Ride" on YouTube

"Bumpy Ride" is a soca song by Swedish-Congolese R&B singer-songwriter Mohombi from his debut studio album, MoveMeant (2011). It was released as his debut single in the United States on 24 August 2010. Written by RedOne, Bilal "The Chef" Hajji, AJ Junior, and Mohombi, and produced by RedOne, it is the first release on RedOne's label 2101 Records, a joint venture with Universal Music. He also released a popular bilingual French/English version for the Francophone markets. The song became a number-one hit in The Netherlands, and a top ten hit in Belgium, Czech Republic, Denmark, Finland, France, Norway, Poland, Slovakia, and Sweden.

== Critical reception ==
Paul Lester of The Guardian described the song as a "popped-up dancehall affair wherein Mohombi promises to 'rock' the female subject of his affections 'like a rodeo'."

== Track listing ==
- US digital download
1. "Bumpy Ride" – 3:44
- German digital download
1. "Bumpy Ride" – 3:45
2. "Bumpy Ride" (Chuckie Remix) – 6:23
- French digital download
1. "Bumpy Ride" – 3:45
2. "Bumpy Ride" (French Version) – 3:45

== Personnel ==
- Songwriting – RedOne, Bilal "The Chef" Hajji, AJ Junior, Mohombi
- Production, instruments, programming and vocal arrangement – RedOne
- Recording, engineering and vocal editing – RedOne, Trevor Muzzy
- Backing vocals – RedOne, Mohombi

== Charts and certifications ==
=== Weekly charts ===
Chart (2010)	Peak position
Belgium (Ultratop 50 Flanders)	7
Belgium (Ultratop 50 Wallonia)	10
Canada (Canadian Hot 100)	32
Czech Republic Airplay (ČNS IFPI)	3
Denmark (Tracklisten)	8
European Hot 100 Singles	10
Finland (Suomen virallinen lista)	2
France (SNEP)	3
Netherlands (Dutch Top 40)	1
Netherlands (Single Top 100)	2
Norway (VG-lista)	3
Poland (Polish Airplay New)	4
Romania (Romanian Top 100)	14
Russia Airplay (TopHit)	9
Slovakia Airplay (ČNS IFPI)	3
Spain (Promusicae)	17
Spain (Airplay Chart)	7
Sweden (Sverigetopplistan)	6
Switzerland (Schweizer Hitparade)	41
Ukraine Airplay (TopHit)	30

2026 weekly chart performance
Chart (2026)	Peak position
Finland Airplay (Radiosoittolista)	79

=== Year-end charts ===
Chart (2010)	Position
Belgium (Ultratop Flanders)	47
European Hot 100 Singles	63
France (SNEP)	21
Netherlands (Dutch Top 40)	12
Netherlands (Single Top 100)	27
Sweden (Sverigetopplistan)	19
Chart (2011)	Position
Canada (Canadian Hot 100)	97
France (SNEP)	81
Romania (Romanian Top 100)	55
Russia Airplay (TopHit)	36
Ukraine Airplay (TopHit)	90

=== Certifications ===
Region	Certification	Certified units/sales
Denmark (IFPI Danmark)	2× Platinum	180,000^{‡}
Spain (Promusicae)	Gold	30,000^{‡}
Sweden (GLF)	2× Platinum	80,000^{‡}
^{‡} Sales+streaming figures based on certification alone.

== Release history ==
Region	Date	Label	Format
United States	24 August 2010	Interscope Records, Cherrytree Records, 2101 Records	Digital download
Germany	3 September 2010	Universal Music	Digital download
Germany	5 November 2010	Universal Music	CD single
