= KMC (musician) =

Trinidadian musician (born 1971)

- Origin: Rio Claro, Trinidad, Trinidad and Tobago
- Genres: Soca
- Occupations: Singer, producer, composer, arranger
- Labels: Sequence Records, 2101 Records

Ken Marlon Charles, shortened to KMC, is a soca musician from Trinidad. He is known for songs such as "Soul on Fire," "Soca Bashment," and "Bashment to Carnival."

== Career ==
As a child, KMC listened to local bands in his village. He began playing the drums around age seven and later learned to play melodic instruments.

KMC began his musical career as a dancehall artist and released sixteen recordings before shifting toward soca in 1998. That year, he produced several soca tracks, including "Kaya," "Bashment to Carnival," and "Soca Bashment."

He has independently released more than ten soca albums and compilations, including Voodoo, Drunk Man, Concubine, Party Alliance, Thunderbirds, X-Out, Stinging Nettle, and Tear Drop Riddims. He also produced songs for soca performers such as Machel Montano, Bunji Garlin, Maximus Dan, Destra Garcia, Denise Belfon, and Jungle. His catalog includes tracks such as “Doh Want to Know”, “Carnival Rags”, “Rough Wine”, “First Experience”, “Flopping Up”, “Cyah X Me Out”, and “Animal”.

In April 2005, KMC signed with the American music label Sequence Records. His debut album on the label was titled Soul on Fire, named after the album's first single. The album entered the Billboard 200 at number 84 and sold approximately 285,000 copies worldwide. Toledo Blade described the album as "an acquired taste".

The single "Soul on Fire" was the first track released from the album in June 2005. The song's remix featured Jamaican dancehall artist Beenie Man and American disc jockey Fat Man Scoop. The music video for "Soul on Fire" was filmed in Tobago and featured the Tobagonian-born Trinidadian model Teri Bovell.

In October 2005, KMC joined Beenie Man on his US "King of the Dancehall" tour.

== Discography ==
=== Albums ===
- 1996: Street Life
- 2002: Get Better
- 2005: Soul on Fire
- 2020: Somebody To Touch Me
