= Mohombi =

Congolese-Swedish singer-songwriter

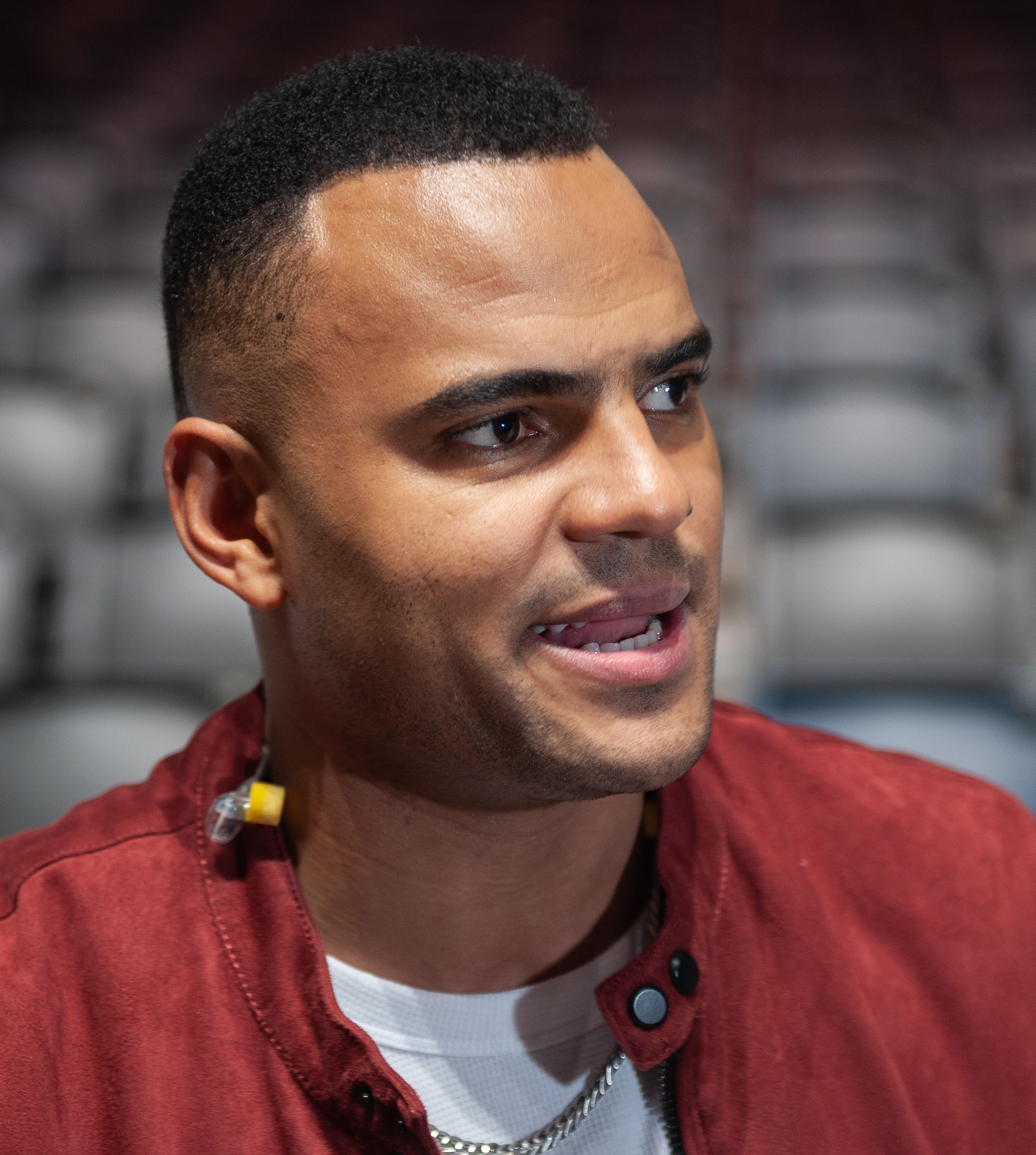
- Mohombi in 2019

Background information
- Born: Mohombi Nzasi Moupondo; 17 October 1986 (age 39); Kinshasa, Zaire (now the Democratic Republic of the Congo)
- Origin: Stockholm, Sweden
- Genres: Pop; R&B; dancehall; urban pop; dance-pop; Afropop
- Occupations: Singer; songwriter; dancer
- Instruments: Vocals; guitar
- Years active: 1999–present
- Labels: 2101; Island; Universal Republic; Interscope; Cherrytree; Cash Money; La Clique; Cat Music
- Website: mohombi.com

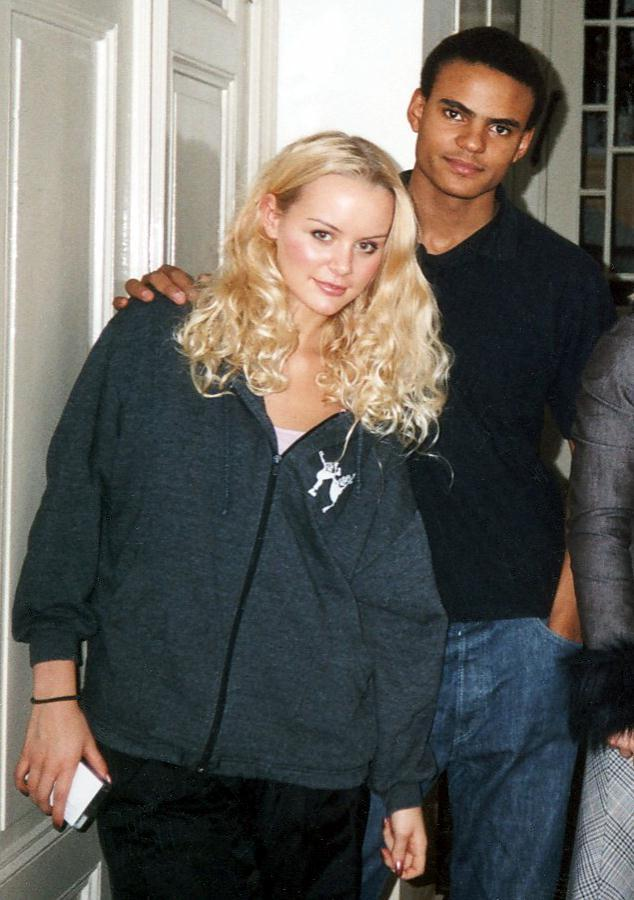
Early on, Helena Mattsson and Mohombi were in the same cast of Wild Side Story.

Mohombi Nzasi Moupondo (born 17 October 1986) is a Congolese-Swedish singer, songwriter and dancer. He grew up in Norsborg and Kista near Stockholm. Mohombi was RedOne's first signing to 2101 Records in joint venture with Universal Music Group. From 2000 to 2008, Mohombi was part of the Swedish hip hop group Avalon with his brother Djo Moupondo. Mohombi released his debut solo single "Bumpy Ride" in August 2010. The single became a worldwide hit, and charted in the top-ten in several countries, and was followed by his debut studio album MoveMeant in February 2011.

== Biography ==
=== Early life ===
Mohombi was born to a Swedish mother and a Congolese father. He has 14 siblings. Mohombi and his family left the war-torn Congo and emigrated to Stockholm, Sweden in 1999 when Mohombi was 13. When he turned 20 years old, Mohombi rented a room in Radio 1 UAE's Simon B's childhood house just to get to know him better. His parents regularly exposed him to varied musical influences from early on in his childhood Mohombi studied at Rytmus Musikgymnasium in Stockholm and appeared early on stage, in 2002 in the Swedish revival of Wild Side Story. He graduated with a bachelor's degree in music from the Royal College of Music, Stockholm. He speaks English, French, Lingala, Spanish, Swahili and Swedish.

=== In duo Avalon ===
In Stockholm, Mohombi and his brother Djo Moupondo, a local club DJ known as DJ Djo formed the group Avalon combining the dancehall and hip hop of the time with the distinctive African beats on which they were raised. From 2004 to 2008 the group sold over half a million records and won the All African Kora Awards, an African equivalent of the Grammy for the category Best Group – Diaspora Europe/Caribbean category, while Mohombi became a prolific songwriter in his own right. At this point, music was only a part-time job, and looking for something more, Mohombi headed to Los Angeles to delop further his career. In 2005, Avalon participated in the Melodifestivalen, in a bid to qualify for Eurovision Song Contest 2005 representing Sweden with English and French multilingual song "Big Up" that also included an intro in Lingala language. Also in 2005, the duo Avalon participated in the show "sthlm", an annual music festival organized at Lava Kulturhuset.

On 2 June 2007, Avalon participated in Hoodsfredsfestivalen in Kista. And on 21 December 2007, Avalon also launched its studio album Afro-Viking destined mainly for the African market. Avalon has also collaborated with artists / songwriters such as Bob Sinclar, Million Stylez, Mohaamed Lamine, Silver Room, Alexander Papadimas and many others.

=== 2010–2012 ===
Mohombi collaborated with Swedish rapper Lazee on "Do It", which was released in Sweden on 31 May 2010. It debuted at number nine on the Swedish Singles Chart. In Los Angeles, Mohombi was introduced through friends to the Swedish-Moroccan producer RedOne. The singer's debut single, "Bumpy Ride" was the first release on RedOne's label 2101 Records, a joint venture with Universal. It was released in the United States on 24 August 2010. Mohombi released "Miss Me" as his debut single in the United Kingdom on 31 October 2010. It features American rapper Nelly. His third single called "Dirty Situation" was released in Europe on 11 November and features R&B singer Akon. "Dirty Situation" is played at the beginning and then again later on in the middle of the music video for "Miss Me". Mohombi's debut album, MoveMeant was released in Europe Monday 28 February 2011 and in the US by the end of 2011. Mohombi features on the track "Hoola Hoop", a track on the 2011 Stella Mwangi album Kinanda. Mohombi's single, "Coconut Tree" featured vocals by Nicole Scherzinger. In 2011, Mohombi made his first annual appearance at the MAD Video Music Awards, in Athens, Greece, duetting with Katerina Stikoudi, on a joint version of "Coconut Tree (Coconut Tree Make Me Stay)".

On 2 September 2011, Mohombi released another single called "Maraca" on iTunes in Sweden. Mohombi also recorded the song "Suave (Kiss Me)" with Nayer & Pitbull. He was nominated for Best Swedish Act at the 2011 European Music Awards in Belfast. This Must Be Pop listed him 7th in their Top 10 of 2012. On 16 December 2011, he appeared as musical guest on season 1 of The Voice of Romania.

=== Later work ===
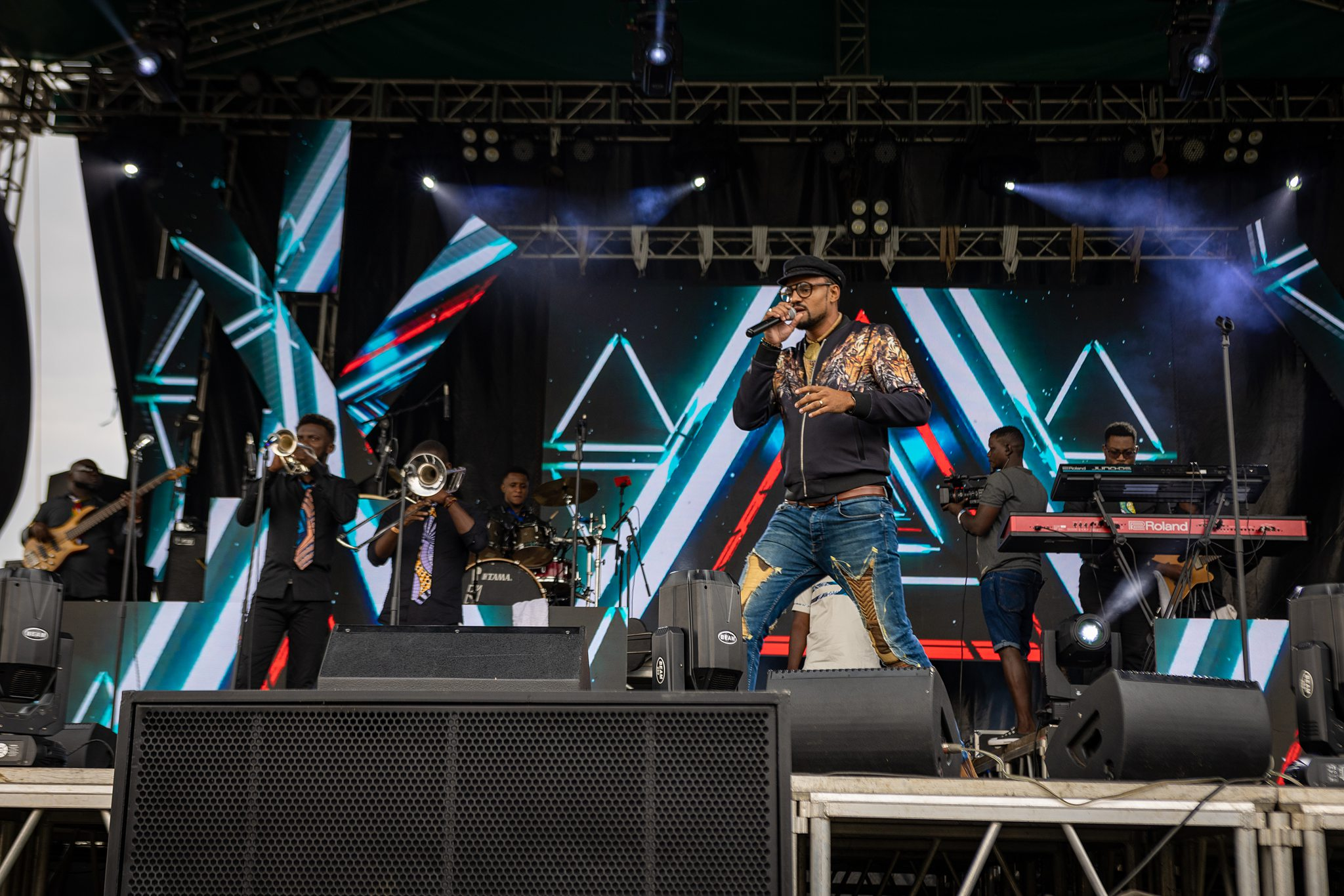
Mohombi at the Amani Festival in 2022

In 2014, Mohombi decided to abandon Universal Music and form his own music label, La Clique Music, releasing his album Universe. Mohombi was invited in July 2015 to represent his country's youth at a summit organized by the United Nations in New York City. He was also a jury member of the 2015 Best of the Best All Stair season, the biggest talent show in the Democratic Republic of Congo. In 2015 Mohombi participated with Pitbull on "Baddest Girl in Town" with wisin. In 2016 Mohombi participated with Joey Montana on Picky (remix) with Akon. Also In 2016, Mohombi co-won a Grammy Award for his participation on the Pitbull album Dale for the category: Best album of the year.

He participated in Melodifestivalen 2019 with the song "Hello", where he made it to the final finishing in fifth place. In 2020, he participated in Melodifestivalen 2020 with the song "Winners". He reached the finale, in which he finished in twelfth place, scoring a total of 26 points.

On 8 December 2022, Mohombi announced his candidacy for the 2023 presidential election in the DRC as an independent candidate. @Mohombi (8 December 2022). "Mohombi Moupondo - Candidat Independent | Élections 2023 !" (Tweet) – via Twitter.

== Awards and nominations ==
- Melodifestivalen 2005.
- At the Kora Awards:
  - Kora All African Music Awards 2003
  - Kora All African Music Awards 2004
- 2008/2009: Kora All African Music Awards Nominee 2009/2010 – Best African Artist/Group.
- MTV European Music Awards 2011 – Nomination: Best Singer Swedish of the Year.
- 2011: nominated for Swedish Grammis for Bumpy Ride.
- Latin Italian Music Awards 2015 – Mohombi wins a Latin Italian Music Awards for his participation on Pitbull's album DALE.
- U.S Grammy Award 2016 – Best Latin Album. Mohombi wins a grammy for his participation on Pitbull's album DALE.
- Billboard Music Award 2016 – Mohombi wins a Billboard Award for his participation on Pitbull's album DALE.
- Big Apple Music Award 2017 – Best African Act Awards.
- In 2018: Mohombi is nominated for the Daf Bama Music Awards in the category of Best African Artist of the Year.
- In 2018: Mohombi is nominated for the Latin Grammy Awards as a composer of J Balvin album Vibras.
- Melodifestivalen 2019.
- 2019: Mohombi wins an award in the BMI Award 2019, in the category: contemporary Latin song of the year to be composer on the title Mi Gente of J Balvin.
- Melodifestivalen 2020.

== Discography ==
- MoveMeant (2011)
- Universe (2014)
- Rumba 2.0 (2020)
