= RedOne =

Moroccan-Swedish musician and producer (born 1972)

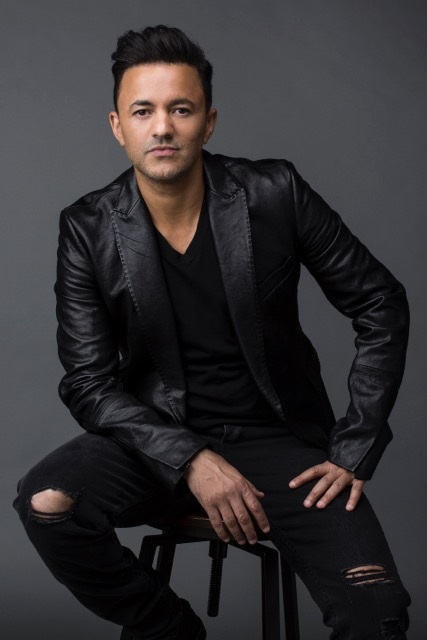
- RedOne in 2017
- Born: Nadir Khayat; 9 April 1972 (age 54); Tétouan, Morocco
- Occupations: Record producer; record executive; singer; songwriter
- Years active: 1991–present
- Spouse: Laila Aziz (m. 2009)
- Musical career
- Genres: Pop; dance; hip-hop; Arabic music
- Instruments: Keyboards; guitar; drums; vocals
- Labels: RedOne; Warner; Cash Money; Interscope; Universal Republic; Island; Warner Bros.; Rotana; Universal

Nadir Khayat (Arabic: نادر خياط, Nādir Ḵayyāṭ; born 9 April 1972), better known by his stage name RedOne, is a Moroccan-Swedish record producer, record executive, singer and songwriter. He has worked in production for high-profile recording artists including Lady Gaga, Jennifer Lopez, Enrique Iglesias, Pitbull, One Direction, Jung Kook, Kat Deluna, Nicki Minaj, and Usher, among others. He also produced many songs for artists that were ranked among the best-selling songs list. His credits include several hit songs on Billboard and international charts; pop, rock, R&B, house, hip hop, and dance music are his frequented musical genres. He established his namesake record label in 2010.

RedOne has won three Grammy Awards out of eight nominations and one Latin Grammy Award nomination. He also won Producer of the Year at the 2011 Grammis Award, a Swedish music award instituted as a regional equivalent to the Grammy Awards. In 2009, he was the number one producer on the Billboard Hot 100, ranking number three as a songwriter and winning BMI's Songwriter of the Year. Outside of music, he has held the position of Creative Entertainment Executive at FIFA since 2021.

== Biography ==
=== Early life ===
RedOne was born as Nadir Khayat in Tétouan, Morocco. In an interview, he said he was the ninth and youngest child in his family. In 1991, age 19, he emigrated to Sweden to pursue a career as a musician. In an interview with HitQuarters website, he said his moving to Sweden was because, "there was so much good music coming from there" mentioning ABBA, Europe, and Roxette as among the most influential on him.

=== 1991–2006: Career in Sweden ===
In 1995, he changed directions by opting to produce and write songs for other artists. Instrumental in helping him make this transition was Rami Yacoub, another fellow ex-rock musician. Yacoub, a Palestinian-Swedish songwriter/producer already enjoyed considerable success and was a well-established producer. Inviting RedOne to work with him in the studio, he taught RedOne about "programming and how the software works" and the pair co-wrote a number of songs together. During this period of cooperation, RedOne worked with the successful Swedish girl band Popsie writing their songs "Funky" and "Joyful Life" co-written and co-produced by Yacoub and RedOne (and where RedOne was credited on Popsie's 1998 self-titled album as songwriter and producer Nadir K). He chose the alias 'RedOne', a pseudonym of the name of a friend of his, Redouan. Redouan introduced Rami to Max Martin, Yacoub was asked some time later to join Cheiron Studios and the two parted company with Yacoub working extensively with huge names like Backstreet Boys, Britney Spears, Westlife and Céline Dion, amongst others.

RedOne then moved on to produce various Swedish and European pop acts. In 2001–2002, he co-produced A*Teens, originally an ABBA teen tribute band that already had a huge hit with The ABBA Generation. RedOne co-produced two of their follow-up albums, Teen Spirit in 2001 and Pop 'Til You Drop in 2002 with some original songs like "...to the Music", "Slam" co-written with Flame, Hortlund, and J. Boogie and "Singled Out" co-written with AJ Junior, Dhani, Sara, Savan Kotecha, and ShawnDark in a bid to launch them as "more than just a cover band".

After years of struggling, RedOne finally began to achieve recognition for his work in 2005. He wrote two songs for Daniel Lindström's self-titled chart-topping album, "Break Free" and "My Love Won't Let You Down". RedOne then had his first number one on Sverigetopplistan with Darin Zanyar's "Step Up". The song, co-written by RedOne, Darin, and RedOne's frequent collaborator Bilal Hajji, won them a Swedish Grammy and "Scandinavian Song of the Year". He went on to co-produce Darin's two albums The Anthem and self-titled album Darin alongside well-known producers like Ghost, Jörgen Elofsson, Arnthor Birgisson and George Samuelson.

RedOne had crossover success with the Canadian singer and Juno Award Carl Henry with hits "I Wish" and "Little Mama". In the ensuing period, he went on to produce a number of Swedish and European pop acts. These included the Dutch pop band Ch!pz (2005), two songs Cariño Mio and Wanna Play by the Mexican teen group RBD for the album Rebels (2006), American Christina Milian in a remix of her track "L.O.V.E." as "L.O.V.E. (RedOne remix)" from her album Best Of, the Dutch singer EliZe in "Itsy Bitsy Spider" and Swedish Idol contestant and popular singer Ola Svensson in "Cops Come Knocking" and "Go Go Sweden", the latter in support of the Sweden national team, all in 2006. In 2005, he also worked with pop singer Britney Spears and songwriter Michelle Bell on a track titled "Money Love and Happiness" for her scrapped studio album "Original Doll", but the track remained unreleased until 2012, when Bell leaked the track in full online.

=== 2006–2009: International breakthrough and move to the United States ===
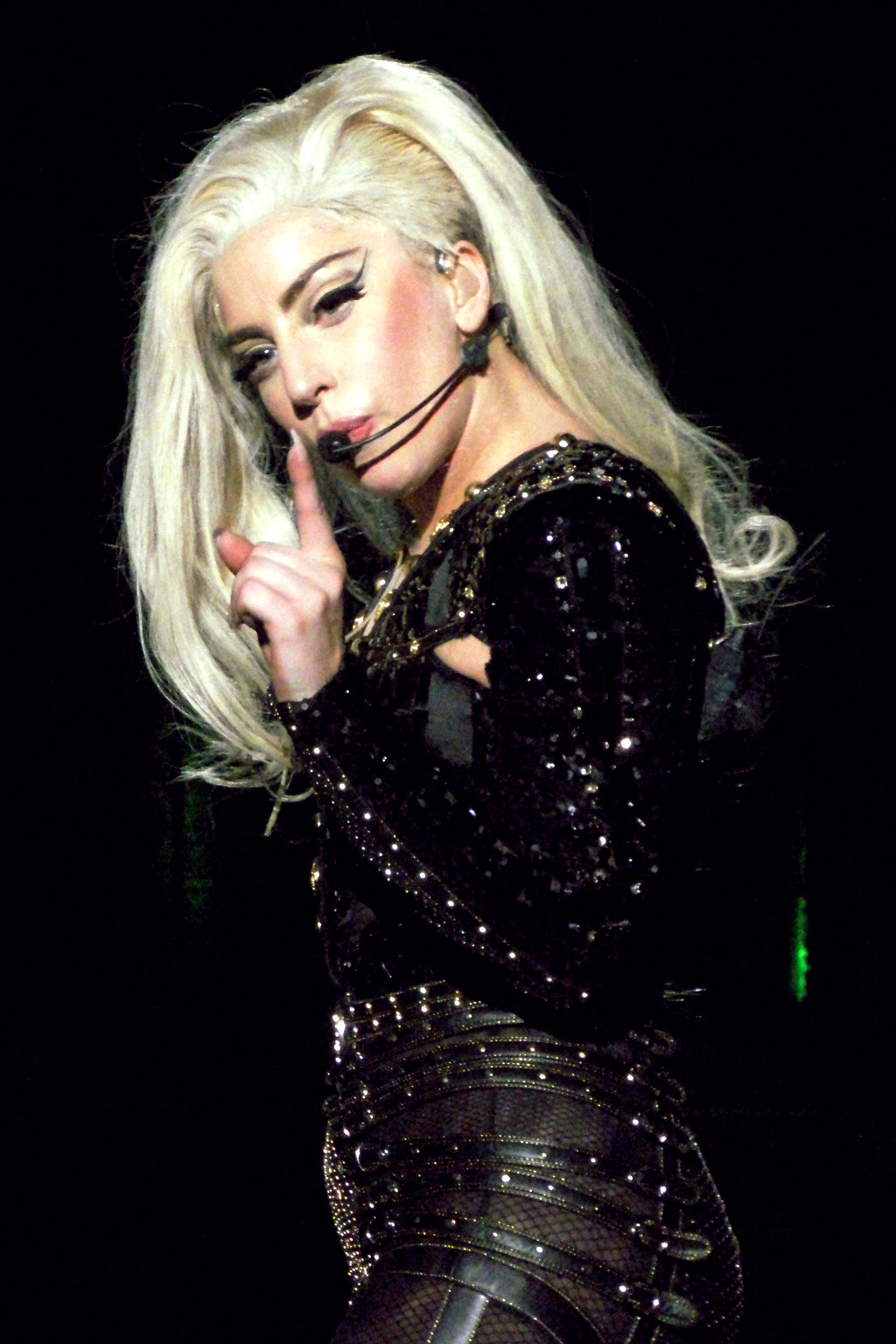
Lady Gaga and RedOne produced songs such as "Poker Face", "Bad Romance" and "Just Dance" during their partnership.

In 2006, RedOne produced the single "Bamboo" that was named an "Official Melody" for the 2006 FIFA World Cup. "Bamboo" was featured for the branding and promotion of the event during television broadcasts and advertising campaigns, branded cross-promotions, and as a part of the World Cup Official Music Program, gaining him much audio exposure. In addition, The Fédération Internationale de Football Association (FIFA) made him the main producer and songwriter for the 2006 World Cup Official Music Program.

RedOne also produced a "mash-up" remix of Shakira's "Hips Don't Lie" featuring Wyclef Jean and RedOne's "Bamboo". The remix was performed by Shakira and Wyclef Jean ahead of the World Cup final in Berlin to an estimated worldwide television audience of more than 1.2 billion.

Although "Bamboo" helped establish him as a notable producer in the global marketplace, RedOne himself claimed that the song didn't have the impact he thought it would, saying: "It was a good thing for me as a personal achievement but in terms of business or attracting labels to get more work, it didn't have a big impact, especially not in the US. It opened a few doors that closed quickly after." It was then that he decided to move to the United States with the aim of breaking his career there.

In 2007, RedOne decided to move to Jersey City, New Jersey with his wife for better career opportunities, believing this to be his "now or never opportunity". Initially the move proved unsuccessful; he struggled to secure even a single production and lost all of his money in the process. Penniless and sleeping on an air mattress with his wife, he was ready to move back to Sweden. He says in an interview with Global Post: "I was really depressed, I told my wife, 'We gotta go back'. She said we should borrow money and try for a few more months and then really give up if nothing good happens".

His American breakthrough came when he met with Epic Records to present a song for Kat DeLuna, on an upcoming debut album of hers. RedOne started playing songs in front of the marketing team and label president Charlie Walk. After playing the song "Whine Up", RedOne says, "Walk interrupted me and said, "Stop, you're a genius!" I couldn't believe it. We spent the rest of the time playing music and dancing, it was surreal". A subsequent meeting led to RedOne being given a Jennifer Lopez song to remix followed by a couple of demos for Menudo. RedOne was also entrusted the production role on Kat DeLuna's debut album 9 Lives (2007).

In 2007, Alan Melina and Laurent Besencon, of New Heights Entertainment, the management company for Lady Gaga and RedOne, were introduced to each other. RedOne co-wrote and co-produced Gaga's debut studio album The Fame (2008), and its reissue The Fame Monster (2009), including the top five singles "Just Dance", "Poker Face", "LoveGame", and "Bad Romance".

=== 2010–present: Continued success and RedOne Records ===
RedOne penned many of the songs sung by Alexey Vorobyov (also known as Alex Sparrow), who represented Russia in the Eurovision Song Contest of 2011 and eventually recruited the singer to his record label.

In 2010, RedOne founded 2101 Records, a record label, as a joint venture with Universal Music Group. 2101 Songs on the other hand is a publishing company affiliated with 2101 Records and administered by Sony ATV Songs (BMI). Main acts signed to the label are Jennifer Lopez, Mohombi, Havana Brown, Midnight Red, Porcelain Black and 7Lions.

RedOne continued to work with Gaga on her second studio album, Born This Way (2011). RedOne produced and co-wrote four songs for Nicki Minaj's second album, Pink Friday: Roman Reloaded (2012), including the Billboard Hot 100 top-20 hits "Starships" and "Pound the Alarm".

In the beginning of 2014, RedOne decided to change his record label 2101 Records into RedOne Records. Main acts signed to the label are Midnight Red, Porcelain Black, Ahmed Chawki, Sophia Del Carmen, Kika and Wayne Beckford. RedOne Records also promotes SuperMartXé events productions.

In 2015, RedOne announced that he is working on his debut album entitled RedOne Presents. He declared that he would like to collaborate with Lady Gaga, Enrique Iglesias, Stevie Wonder, and Lionel Richie for the album. Also in 2015, he started working in country music by co-writing and co-producing The Band Perry's song "Live Forever", the first single off their upcoming third studio album.

RedOne signed a recording contract with Warner Bros. Records in January 2016. His first single with Warner Bros., "Don't You Need Somebody" was released on 20 May 2016 and features Enrique Iglesias, R. City, Serayah, and Shaggy. On his transition from producer to being an artist RedOne has said: "I thought that to be a performer, you had to stick to a single sound, and I loved too many kinds of music to do that. But now I find myself wanting to get back to singing and playing, and friends like Enrique have encouraged me to do so. I want to be an artist in a new way, rather than the traditional one. I'm going to do it the RedOne way, which is creating different sounds with different people, doing the records I want to do". On 15 May 2018, Social Media Sensation Saad Abid helped RedOne Support Morocco's bid for the 2026 FIFA World Cup under the #Maymkench2026. In the same year, he produced the song "Festival" where he collaborated with the Mexican YouTuber group Los Polinesios.

In December 2021, he was appointed Creative Entertainment Executive of FIFA, producing the official soundtrack for the 2022 FIFA World Cup in Qatar. He also went on to produce the 2022 FIFA Club World Cup official song entitled "Welcome to Morocco", that took place in Morocco. He wrote and produced the official anthem for the COP28 Summit that took place in Dubai in December 2023.

In June 2014, RedOne was appointed by Florentino Pérez to produce the new anthem for Real Madrid.

== Production and songwriting ==
RedOne continued writing and producing with Gaga and a host of other artists. His international production credits include Lady Gaga, Britney Spears, Pitbull, Enrique Iglesias, Nicki Minaj, and through his own label 2101 Records Jennifer Lopez, Porcelain Black, Havana Brown, Mohombi, 7Lions.

In addition, he has written for and produced for various artists, in alphabetical order: Akon, Marc Anthony, Justin Bieber, Birdman, Zander Bleck, Mary J. Blige, Brandy, Alexandra Burke, Cassie, Cheb Khaled, Cher, Cross Gene, Taio Cruz, Kat DeLuna, Jason Derulo, Jade Ewen, Mylène Farmer, Livvi Franc, Sirusho, Selena Gomez, Ayumi Hamasaki, Enrique Iglesias, Inna, Jean-Roch, Jung Kook, K'naan, Katia, Kika, Sean Kingston, KMC, Little Boots, Cher Lloyd, Pixie Lott, Austin Mahone, MIKA, Nicki Minaj, Mohombi, Nayer, Orianthi, Lionel Richie, Kelly Rowland, Paulina Rubio, Nicole Scherzinger, Space Cowboy, Usher, and Lil Wayne.

Bands include: RBD, Backstreet Boys, Cheetah Girls, Dive Bella Dive, Far East Movement, Flipsyde, Jada, JLS, Love Generation, Midnight Red, New Kids on the Block, One Direction, Sugababes, Now United, Talkback, Ying Yang Twins, amongst others.

== Philanthropy ==
In 2011, RedOne created 2101 Foundation, a non-profit organization committed to helping disadvantaged youth and to inspire and motivate young people to pursue their passion in life through music, arts and education.

He is also involved with A Place Called Home, a safe haven in South Central Los Angeles where underserved youth are empowered to take ownership of the quality and direction of their lives through programs in education, arts, and well-being and are inspired to make a meaningful difference in their community and the world.

== Discography ==
=== Singles ===
Year	Title	Peak positions				Album
Year	Title	SWE	FRA	SPN	SWI	Album
2016	"Don't You Need Somebody" (featuring Enrique Iglesias, R. City, Serayah and Shaggy)	7	150	18	19	Non-album singles
2017	"Boom Boom" (with Daddy Yankee, French Montana and Dinah Jane)	—	170	33	90	Non-album singles
2018	"One World" (featuring Adelina and Now United)	—	—	—	—	Non-album singles
2019	"We Love Africa" (featuring Inna Modja and Aminux)	—	—	—	—	Non-album singles
2025	"Bil Amal" (RedOne, Leiyla & Fares Fairooz)	ー	ー	ー	ー	Non-album singles
2026	"Stay Up High Morocco" (with Toofan)	ー	ー	ー	ー	Non-album singles
"—" denotes a recording that did not chart or was not released in that territory.

=== Other appearances ===
Year	Title	Peak positions									Album
Year	Title	AUT	BEL (Fl)	BEL (Wa)	FRA	GER	ITA	NED	SPN	SWI	Album
2010	"Kick Ass (We Are Young)" (Mika vs. RedOne)	54	8	5	—	54	5	—	—	56	Kick-Ass: Music from the Motion Picture
2012	"Knockin' on Heaven's Door" (featuring Nabil Khayat)	—	—	—	—	—	—	—	—	—	Chimes of Freedom
2014	"A-Ricky-Kee" (SuperMartXé vs. RedOne)	—	—	—	—	—	—	—	—	—	Non-album singles
2014	"¡Hala Madrid! ...y nada más" (Real Madrid featuring RedOne)	—	—	—	143	—	—	—	1	—	Non-album singles
2016	"La Roja Baila (Himno Oficial de la Selección Española)" (Sergio Ramos, Niña Pastori & RedOne)	—	—	—	—	—	—	—	3	—	Non-album singles
2017	"Voy a Bailar" (Ali B featuring Boef, Rolf Sanchez & RedOne)	—	—	—	—	—	—	13	—	—	Non-album singles
2017	"Love Is All That Matters" (Aleksey Vorobev & RedOne)	—	—	—	—	—	—	—	—	—	Non-album singles
2018	"Festival" (Los Polinesios & RedOne)	—	—	—	—	—	—	—	—	—	Non-album singles
2018	"Nos Fuimos Lejos (Arabic Version)" (Descemer Bueno, Enrique Iglesias & Hatim Ammor featuring El Micha & RedOne)	—	—	—	—	—	—	—	—	—	Non-album singles
2021	"Sahra Sabahi" (Saad Lamjarred & Saber Rebai & RedOne)	—	—	—	—	—	—	—	—	—	Non-album singles
2021	"Gaw Elbanat" (Mohamed Ramadan x RedOne x Nouamane Belaiachi)	—	—	—	—	—	—	—	—	—	Non-album singles
2025	We Will Rock You (2025 FIFA Club World Cup Theme Song) (Pitbull x RedOne)	ー	ー	ー	ー	ー	ー	ー	ー	ー	Non-album singles
2026	Follow Me (French Montana x JIHYO x LUDMILLA x Adriana C x RedOne)	ー	ー	ー	ー	ー	ー	ー	ー	ー	Non-album singles
"—" denotes a recording that did not chart or was not released in that territory.											

== Honors and awards ==
Moroccan Royal Award

After the Grammy Awards, RedOne was awarded the Moroccan Royal Award for "Intellectual Excellence" and was decorated officially by King Mohamed VI of Morocco in an official ceremony held in Tangier in 2011.

Grammy Awards

Year	Nominee / work	Award	Result
2009	"Just Dance"	Best Dance Recording	Nominated
2010	The Fame	Best Dance/Electronic Album	Won
2010	The Fame	Album of the Year	Nominated
2010	"Poker Face"	Best Dance Recording	Won
2010	"Poker Face"	Record of the Year	Nominated
2010	"Poker Face"	Song of the Year	Nominated
2011	The Fame Monster	Best Pop Vocal Album	Won
2011	The Fame Monster	Album of the Year	Nominated
2011	RedOne	Producer of the Year, Non-Classical	Nominated
2012	Born This Way	Album of the Year	Nominated

Latin Grammy Awards

Year	Nominee / work	Award	Result
2011	Euphoria	Album of the Year	Nominated

Swedish Music Publishers Association

In 2010 the Swedish Music Publishers Association awarded RedOne composer of the year, song of the year (for Bad Romance), and most played song of the year (also for Bad Romance).

== Personal life ==
Khayat is married to Laila Aziz, currently a creative designer at Kayat, a brand jointly owned by both.
