= Havana Brown discography =

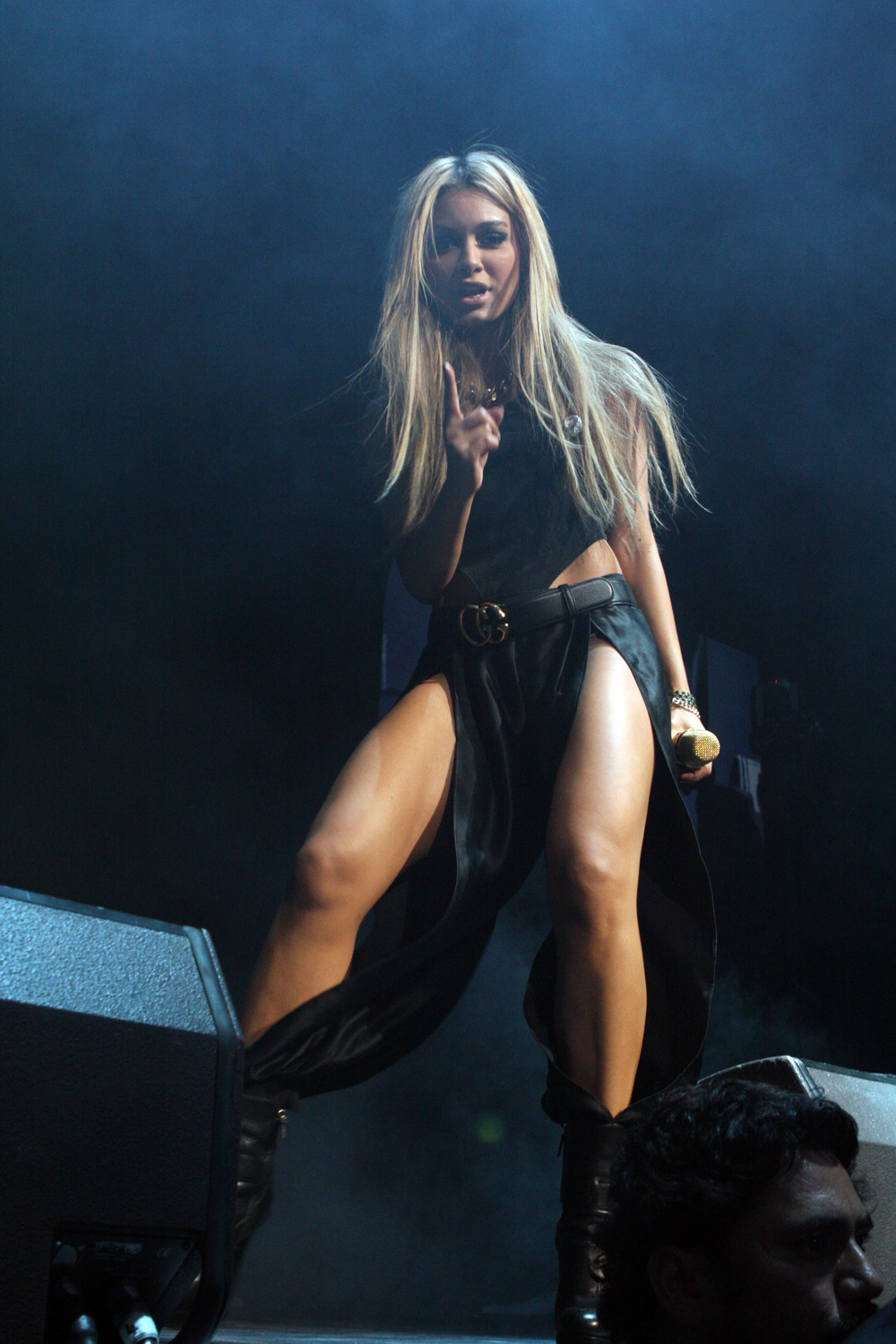
- Studio albums: 1
- Extended plays: 1
- Compilation albums: 14
- Singles: 22
- Music videos: 11

The discography of Australian recording artist and DJ Havana Brown consists of one studio album, fourteen compilation albums, one extended play, twenty-two singles (three as a featured artist) and eleven music videos. Brown, originally a DJ, began performing at small venues around Melbourne and worked with promoters around Australia in her early 20s. In 2008, she was approached by Island Records Australia to see if she was interested in creating compilation albums for the label. Brown has since produced nine albums in a series entitled, Crave, which have all charted within the ARIA Compilation Albums Chart top ten.

In April 2011, Brown released her debut single "We Run the Night", which peaked at number five on the ARIA Singles Chart and was certified triple platinum by the Australian Recording Industry Association (ARIA), for selling 210,000 copies. In September 2011, Brown signed with Universal Republic Records via producer RedOne's label 2101 Records. "We Run the Night" was later remixed by the producer and featured guest vocals by American rapper Pitbull. In the United States, the remix peaked at number 26 on the Billboard Hot 100 chart, and number one on the Hot Dance Club Songs chart. Brown's debut EP When the Lights Go Out was released in July 2012, which contains five songs.

== Albums ==
=== Studio albums ===
List of studio albums, with selected chart positions and certifications
Title	Details	Peak chart positions	
Title	Details	AUS	JPN
Flashing Lights	Released: 11 October 2013; Label: Island, Universal; Formats: CD, digital download	6	74

=== Compilation albums ===
Title	Details	Peak chart positions			Certifications
Title	Details	AUS Comp.	AUS Dance	AUS Urban	Certifications
Crave	Released 1 November 2008 (AU); Label: Universal; Formats: 2×CD, digital download	9	–	5	
Crave – The Love Edition	Released 13 February 2009 (AU); Label: Universal; Formats: 2×CD, digital download	—	–	5	
Crave Vol.2	Released: 12 June 2009 (AU); Label: Universal; Formats: 3×CD, digital download	4	3	4	
Crave Vol.3	Released: 30 October 2009 (AU); Label: Universal; Formats: 3×CD, digital download	7	–	3	
Crave Vol 4	Released: 4 June 2010 (AU); Label: Universal; Formats: 3×CD, digital download	2	–	2	
Crave Vol 5	Released: 29 October 2010 (AU); Label: Universal; Formats: 3×CD, digital download	2	–	1	ARIA: Gold
Crave Vol.6	Released: 28 October 2011 (AU); Label: Universal; Formats: 3×CD, digital download	3	–	1	ARIA: Gold
Crave – Club Edition	Released: 25 May 2012 (AU); Label: Universal; Formats: 2×CD, digital download	6	4	–	
Crave Vol. 7	Released: 26 October 2012 (AU); Label: Universal; Formats: 3×CD, digital download	3	–	1	
Crave – Club Edition V.2	Released: 7 June 2013 (AU); Label: Universal; Formats: 2×CD, digital download	5	—	4	
Crave Vol 8	Released: 1 November 2013 (AU); Label: Universal; Formats: 2×CD, digital download	2	3	—	
Crave – Club Edition V.3	Released: 6 June 2014 (AU); Label: Universal; Formats: 2×CD, digital download	7	5	—	
Crave Vol 9	Released: 17 October 2014 (AU); Label: Universal; Formats: 2×CD, digital download	10	4	—	
Club Mix	Released: 6 August 2014 (JP); Label: Universal; Formats: CD, digital download	—	—	—	
Club Mix (Best Mega Hits)	Released: 1 July 2015 (JP); Label: Universal; Formats: CD, digital download	—	—	—	
Crave Vol. 10: The Diamond Edition	Released: 6 November 2015 (AU); Label: Universal; Formats: 4×CD, digital download	6	2	—	
Club Mix (Super Hyper Hits)	Released: 27 May 2016 (JP); Label: Universal; Formats: CD, digital download	—	—	—	
"—" denotes items which were not released in that country or failed to chart.

== Extended plays ==
Title	Details	Peak chart positions		Certifications
Title	Details	AUS	US Heat	Certifications
When the Lights Go Out	Released: 17 July 2012 (AU); Label: Island, Universal; Formats: CD, digital download	16	50	ARIA: Platinum

== Singles ==
=== As lead artist ===
Title	Year	Peak chart positions										Certifications	Album
Title	Year	AUS	BEL (WA)	CAN	CZH	FRA	NOR	NZ	SVK	US	US Dance	Certifications	Album
"We Run the Night"	2011	5	45	—	—	37	—	5	—	—	—	ARIA: 6× Platinum; RMNZ: Platinum	Non-album single
"Get It"	2011	38	—	—	—	—	—	—	—	—	—	ARIA: Gold	Non-album single
"We Run the Night (Remix)" (featuring Pitbull)	2011	—	—	48	53	—	17	—	16	26	1	RIAA: Platinum	When the Lights Go Out
"You'll Be Mine" (featuring R3hab)	2012	— (Note: In Australia, When the Lights Go Out appeared on the ARIA Singles Chart. Sales of songs on the EP, including "You'll Be Mine", went toward the sales tallies of When the Lights Go Out and therefore could not chart separately.)	—	—	—	—	—	—	—	—	—	ARIA: Platinum	When the Lights Go Out
"Big Banana" (featuring R3hab & Prophet)	2012	18	— (Note: Although "Big Banana" did not chart on the Belgian Singles Chart (Wallonia), it peaked at number 25 on the Belgian Tip Chart (Wallonia).)	—	84	—	—	—	—	—	1	ARIA: Platinum	When the Lights Go Out
"Spread a Little Love"	2013	—	—	—	—	—	—	—	—	—	—		When the Lights Go Out
"Flashing Lights"	2013	68	—	—	—	—	—	—	—	—	1		Flashing Lights
"Warrior"	2013	11	—	—	—	—	—	—	—	—	1	ARIA: 3× Platinum	Flashing Lights
"Whatever We Want"	2014	35	—	—	—	—	—	—	—	—	—		Non-album single
"Better Not Said"	2014	79	—	—	—	—	—	—	—	—	—		Non-album single
"No Ordinary Love" (Walden vs. Havana Brown)	2015	—	—	—	—	—	—	—	—	—	—		Non-album single
"Bullet Blowz" (Havana Brown & Kronic (DJ))	2015	—	—	—	—	—	—	—	—	—	—		Non-album single
"Battle Cry" (featuring Bebe Rexha & Savi)	2015	59	—	—	—	—	—	—	—	—	—		Non-album single
"Ba*Bing"	2015	46	—	—	—	—	—	—	—	—	—		Flashing Lights
"Like Lightning" (featuring Dawin)	2016	—	—	—	—	—	—	— (Note: "Like Lightning" did not enter the NZ Top 40 Singles Chart, but peaked at number six on the NZ Heatseeker Singles Chart.)	—	—	—		Non-album single
"Glimpse" (featuring Rich the Kid)	2018	—	—	—	—	—	—	—	—	—	—		Non-album single
"Cookie" (featuring Veronica Vega)	2019	—	—	—	—	—	—	—	—	—	—		Non-album single
"All Day"	2019	—	—	—	—	—	—	—	—	—	—		Non-album single
"Forever Young"	2023	—	—	—	—	—	—	—	—	—	—		Non-album single
"—" denotes a recording which was not released in that territory or failed to chart.

=== As featured artist ===
Title	Year	Album
"Chasing Shadows" (Jamie Drastik featuring Pitbull and Havana Brown)	2013	—N/a
"Turn It Up" (Spicy Chocolate featuring AK-69 and Havana Brown)	2013	Shibuya Ragga Sweet Collection 3
"House of Glass" (KONO featuring Havana Brown)	2017	—N/a

=== Promotional singles ===
Title	Year	Peak chart positions	Album
Title	Year	AUS	Album
"City of Darkness"	2012	—	Non-album single
"White Flag" (featuring Ashley Wallbridge)	2015	—	Non-album single
"—" denotes items which failed to chart.

== Other appearances ==
Title	Year	Album
"Last Night" (Pitbull featuring Havana Brown and Afrojack)	2012	Global Warming

== Music videos ==
=== As lead artist ===
Title	Year	Director(s)
"We Run the Night"	2011	Benn Jae and Tony Prescott
"Get It"	2011	Ryan Pallotta
"We Run the Night" (featuring Pitbull)	2012	Ryan Pallotta and Ray Kay
"You'll Be Mine" (featuring R3hab)	2012	Anna Mastro
"Big Banana" (featuring R3hab and Prophet)	2013	Einar Egilsson
"Spread a Little Love"	2013	Einar Egilsson
"Warrior"	2013	Einar Egilsson
"Ba*Bing"	2014	The Squared Division
"Better Not Said"	2014	Marc Furmie
"Battle Cry" (featuring Bebe Rexha and Savi)	2015	The Squared Division
"Like Lightning" (featuring Dawin)	2016	The Squared Division

=== As featured artist ===
Title	Year	Director(s)
"Turn It Up" (Spicy Chocolate featuring AK-69 and Havana Brown)	2013	
