= Lightning (disambiguation) =

Lightning is a discharge of atmospheric electricity.

Lightning or Lightnin' may also refer to:

== Arts, entertainment and media ==
=== Film and television ===
- Lightnin' (1925 film), a comedy by John Ford
- Lightning (1925 film), a German silent drama film
- Lightning (1927 film), an American film of 1927
- Lightnin' (1930 film), an American Pre-Code comedy film
- Lightning (1952 film), a film by Mikio Naruse
- Damini – Lightning, a 1993 Indian courtroom drama film by Rajkumar Santoshi
- Lightning (dog), a German shepherd who appeared in various 1930s films
- Lightning (Tom and Jerry), an orange cat in the Tom and Jerry cartoons
- Lightning McQueen, a character in Cars and its sequels, played by Owen Wilson
- Lightning, a character from the fourth season of Battle for Dream Island, an animated web series
- Lightning, a bloodhound in Racing Stripes
- Lightning, a BBC Two television quiz show hosted by comedian Zoe Lyons

=== Literature ===
- Lightning (Koontz novel), a 1988 thriller novel by Dean Koontz
- Lightning (Steel novel), a 1995 romance novel by Danielle Steel
- Lightning (Lutz novel), a 1996 detective novel in the Fred Carver series by John Lutz
- Lightning (Hunter novel), a 1984 87th Precinct novel by Evan Hunter as Ed McBain
- Lightnin' (play), 1918
- Lightning (comics), a list of comics characters
  - Lightning (DC Comics) (Jennifer Pierce), a DC Comics superhero
  - Lightning, one of the superpowered brothers Thunder and Lightning
  - Lightning, a member of the Tower Comics T.H.U.N.D.E.R. Agents

=== Music ===
==== Albums ====
- Lightning (Borut Kržišnik album), 2013
- Lightning (Matt and Kim album), 2012
- Lightning, by J, 2021
- Lightning, an EP by Cash Cash, or the title song, 2014

==== Songs ====
- "Lightning" (The Wanted song), 2011
- "Lightning" (Cash Cash song), 2014
- "Lightning", by Bag Raiders, 2019
- "Lightning", by Charli XCX from Crash, 2022
- "Lightning", by Counting Crows, one of the "Flying Demos", 1991
- "Lightning", by Eric Church from Sinners Like Me, 2006
- "Lightning", by Jessie Ware from That! Feels Good!, 2023
- "Lightning", by Little Mix from Get Weird, 2015
- "Lightning", by Mitski from Nothing's About to Happen to Me, 2026
- "Lightning", by State Champs from Living Proof, 2018
- "Lightning", by Supernaut from the B-side of "I Like It Both Ways", 1976

==== Labels ====
- Lightning Records (Belgium), defunct parent label of Bonzai Records
- Lightning Records (UK label), a record label founded in the 1970s

=== Other uses in arts, entertainment and media ===
- Lightning (Entertainment City), a roller coaster at Entertainment City in Kuwait
- Lightning (Revere Beach), a roller coaster that formerly operated at Revere Beach in Revere, Massachusetts
- Lightning (Final Fantasy), the female protagonist from Final Fantasy XIII
- Lightning, a game mode in Bejeweled 3
- Lightning, the horse of the mythical American cowboy Pecos Bill

== Computing ==
- Lightning (connector), a power and data bus for Apple iPhone, iPod, and iPad products
- Lightning (software), an extension that adds calendar and scheduling functionality to the Mozilla Thunderbird e-mail client
- GNU lightning, a library for just-in-time compilation
- Lightning Network, the blockchain payment protocol
- Lightning, a public front end to the Salesforce.com platform

== Firearms ==
- M1869 Werder, a Bavarian/German Peabody-pattern rifle, designated as the "Lightning" model
- Colt Lightning Carbine, a rifle manufactured between 1884 and 1904
- AMT Lightning pistol
- AMT Lightning 25/22 rifle

== People ==
=== Nickname ===
- Lightnin' Chance (1925–2005), American session musician Floyd Chance
- Lightnin' Hopkins (1912–1982), American country blues singer, songwriter, and guitarist Sam John Hopkins
- Lightnin' Slim (1913–1974), African-American blues musician Otis V. Hicks
- René Hall (1911–1988), nicknamed Lightnin', American jazz banjoist
- Steve Krulevitz (born 1951), American tennis player
- Usain Bolt, (born 1986), Jamaican sprinter

=== Stage name and ring name ===
- Jeff Farmer (wrestler) or Lightning, American professional wrestler
- Lightning (Gladiators) or Kim Betts (born 1971), English bodybuilder and a star of the UK version of Gladiators
- Lightning (wrestler), Puerto Rican professional wrestler
- Lightning, professional wrestler from the Gorgeous Ladies of Wrestling

=== Surname ===
- Cody Lightning (born 1986), Cree Native American actor
- Crystle Lightning (born 1981), American/Canadian actress and musician
- Georgina Lightning, Canadian First Nations film director, screenwriter and actress, mother of Crystle and Cody Lightning
- Royston Lightning, Australian rugby league player
- Charlie Lightening, British filmmaker

== Places ==
- Lightning (Atlanta), a former neighborhood of Atlanta, Georgia, US
- Lightning Peak (disambiguation), several mountain peaks in Canada and the US
- Lightning Lake, British Columbia, Canada

== Sports ==
=== Australia ===
- Adelaide Lightning, a Women's Basketball League team
- Lightning Stakes, a thoroughbred horse race
- Pine Hills Lightning, a Greater Brisbane League baseball club

=== Ireland ===
- Drogheda Lightning, a defunct American football team (2010–2015)
- Leinster Lightning, a provincial cricket team

=== United Kingdom ===
- Lancashire Lightning, the name for the Lancashire County Cricket Club during one-day matches
- Lightning (women's cricket), a women's cricket team based in the East Midlands
- Loughborough Lightning (disambiguation), several teams in Loughborough, Leicestershire

=== United States ===
- Buffalo Lightning, former name (1998-2005) of the Buffalo Jr. Sabres Junior "A" ice hockey team from Buffalo, New York
- Carolina Lightnin', a defunct American Soccer League team (1981–1984)
- Colorado Lightning, a Professional Arena Soccer League founded in 2008
- Dallas Lightning, a defunct United Soccer Leagues W-League team (1993–1996)
- Detroit Lightning, a Major Indoor Soccer League franchise for the 1979–1980 season
- Los Angeles Lightning, a professional basketball team in the Independent Basketball Association
- Louisville Lightning, a Professional Arena Soccer League team founded in 2008
- Minnesota Lightning, a women's United Soccer Leagues W-League team
- Oklahoma City Lightning, a full-contact American football team in the Women's Spring Football League
- Rockford Lightning, a defunct Continental Basketball League franchise
- Stockton Lightning, a defunct indoor football team (2006–2010)
- Tampa Bay Lightning, a National Hockey League ice hockey franchise

=== Other countries ===
- London Lightning, a Canadian professional basketball team based in London, Ontario
- Tel Aviv Lightning, an Israel Baseball League franchise

== Transportation and military ==
=== Aircraft ===
- Beechcraft Lightning, an experimental civilian turboprop aircraft
- English Electric Lightning, a supersonic British fighter aircraft of the Cold War era
- Lockheed P-38 Lightning, an American fighter aircraft of World War II
- Lockheed Martin F-35 Lightning II, a US/UK fighter aircraft, the Joint Strike Fighter
- Sport Copter Lightning, American autogyro

=== Automotive ===
- Lightning Car Company, a British company that builds electric sports cars
  - Lightning GT, the flagship vehicle of the aforementioned car company
- Ford Lightning (disambiguation), three pickup trucks made by Ford Motor Company
- BSA Lightning, a motorcycle produced by BSA between 1965 and 1972

=== Rail ===
- Lightning Route, an early tram service in Montgomery, Alabama, US
- Lightning, a GWR Iron Duke Class locomotive on the Great Western Railway from 1847 to 1878
- Lightning, one of the GWR 3031 Class locomotives built for and run on the Great Western Railway between 1891 and 1915

=== Ships and boats ===
- Lightning (clipper), a clipper ship built by Donald McKay in 1854
- Lightning (dinghy), a 19-foot one-design sloop-rigged sailing dinghy designed in 1938 for three-man class racing
- HMS Lightning, the name of several Royal Navy ships

== Other uses ==
- Lightning, the mascot of Middle Tennessee State University
- Advising Platform Lightning, a military base in Afghanistan operated by NATO
- 78th Infantry Division (United States) or Lightning

== See also ==
- Greased Lightning (disambiguation)
- Inazuma (disambiguation)
- Lightning Comics (disambiguation)
- Like Lightning (disambiguation)
- Operation Lightning (disambiguation)
- Litening, a targeting pod for attack aircraft
