= Flashing Lights (Havana Brown song) =

Single by Havana Brown

from the album Flashing Lights
- Released: 23 August 2013
- Genre: Dance-pop; disco
- Length: 4:21
- Label: Island Records Australia
- Songwriter(s): Angelique Meunier, Nadir Khayat, John Mamann, Jean Claude Sindres, Yohanne Simon, Teddy Sky
- Producer(s): RedOne

Havana Brown singles chronology
"Spread a Little Love" (2011)	"Flashing Lights" (2013)	"Warrior" (2013)

Lyric video
- "Flashing Lights" on YouTube

"Flashing Lights" is a song by Australian DJ and recording artist Havana Brown for her first studio album of the same name (2013). The recording was written by Brown, Nadir Khayat, John Mamann, Jean Claude Sindres, Yohanne Simon and Teddy Sky and produced by RedOne. It was released as the album's lead single on 23 August 2013 by Island Records Australia as a digital download. Official remixes were digitally released on 13 September 2013. The theme of the "Flashing Lights" is about a toxic relationship.

"Flashing Lights" peaked at number sixty-eight on the Australian ARIA Singles Chart. It peaked at number one on the US Hot Dance Club Songs chart, becoming her third number one hit atop that chart.

== Background and composition ==
In July 2012, Havana Brown released her debut EP When the Lights Go Out. The recording was preceded by the release of her debut single "We Run the Night" which peaked at number five in Australia and certified triple platinum. It also charted at 26 on the US Billboard Hot 100 and attained a platinum certification. Her third single, "Big Banana", also gained platinum status in Australia and, along with "We Run the Night", peaked at number one on the US Hot Dance Club Songs charts.

"Flashing Lights" is a downtempo, dance-pop and disco song, written by Brown together with RedOne, John Mamann, Jean Claude Sindres, Yohanne Simon and Teddy Sky, with RedOne producing the track. In an interview with The Herald Sun, Brown described the theme of "Flashing Lights": "It's about sexual kryptonite and intense passion". In the chorus Brown sings, “In the flashing lights / Looking for some love tonight / You know I love the way you lie / I wanna do it and do it / and do it again.” She elaborated on the lyrics with the Australian Recording Industry Association (ARIA), saying "Its about that sort of a relationship where you... try and break up, and you get back together cause you think it's love but really it's just, you know, a chemistry". A writer for Homorazzi.com enjoyed the recording, commenting that it has a "Kylie Minogue feel" to it.

== Release ==
Brown announced the release of "Flashing Lights" by posting a video message on her official Instagram page, accompanied by two remixes by Richard Vission and Razor n' Guido. The recording was released digitally via iTunes Stores on 23 August 2013, as the lead single from the album of the same name. An accompanying lyric video was published on Vevo on the same day. Official remixes of the song was serviced to iTunes on 13 September 2013. "Flashing Lights" debuted on the Australian ARIA Singles Chart at its peak, number sixty-eight on 31 August 2013 spending only two weeks in the top 100. In the United States, the track debuted at number forty-nine on the US Hot Dance Club Songs chart, and peaked at number one, becoming her third hit atop that chart.

== Formats and track listings ==
Digital download
No.	Title	Length
1.	"Flashing Lights"	4:21

Official remixes
No.	Title	Length
1.	"Flashing Lights" (Razor n' Guido Club Remix)	7:05
2.	"Flashing Lights" (Dave Audé Extended Remix)	7:54
3.	"Flashing Lights" (Richard Vission Remix)	4:53
4.	"Flashing Lights" (Redial Remix)	5:52
5.	"Flashing Lights" (DJLW Remix)	6:33
6.	"Flashing Lights" (Kayzo Remix)	4:41

== Charts ==
=== Weekly charts ===
Chart (2013)	Peak position
Australia (ARIA)	68
US Dance Club Songs (Billboard)	1
US Hot Dance/Electronic Songs (Billboard)	23

=== Year-End charts ===
Chart (2013)	Position
US Dance Club Songs (Billboard)	13
US Hot Dance/Electronic Songs (Billboard)	74

== Release history ==
Region	Date	Format	Version	Label
Australia	23 August 2013	Digital download	Single	Island Records Australia
Australia	13 September 2013	Digital download	Official remixes	Island Records Australia

== See also ==
- List of number-one dance singles of 2013 (U.S.)
