= Flashing Lights (disambiguation) =

"Flashing Lights" is a 2007 song by Kanye West.

Flashing Lights may also refer to:

== Music ==
- The Flashing Lights, a Canadian musical group
- Flashing Lights (album), an album by Havana Brown
- "Flashing Lights" (Chase & Status and Sub Focus song), 2011
- "Flashing Lights" (Havana Brown song), 2013
- "Flashing Lights", a song by Hawkshaw Hawkins, 1954
- "Flashing Lights", a song by Kenny Gardner, 1979
- "Flashing Lights", a song by Lord Sutch, 1972
- "Flashing Lights", a song by Tyvek, 2008

== Other uses ==
- Emergency vehicle lighting
- Headlight flashing
- Landing lights
- Navigation light
