= Lightning (comics) =

Lightning, in comics, may refer to:

- Lightning (DC Comics), a DC Comics character
- Lightning, one of the duo Thunder and Lightning
- Lightning, a member of the T.H.U.N.D.E.R. Agents
- Lightning, one of several aliases of DC Comics superhero Max Mercury

It may also refer to:

- Well-Spoken Sonic Lightning Flash, a DC Comics character, one of the new forever people.

== See also ==
- Lightning Comics (disambiguation)
- Lightning (disambiguation)
