= List of Billboard number-one dance songs of 2013 =

Billboard magazine compiled the top-performing dance songs in the United States during 2013 on three main charts: the Dance/Electronic Songs, the Dance Club Songs, and the Dance/Mix Show Airplay. The Dance Club Songs was first published in 1976, ranking the most popular songs on dance club based on reports from a national sample of club DJs. The Dance/Mix Show Airplay was first published in 2003, ranking the songs based on dance radio airplay and mix-show plays on top 40 radio and select rhythmic radio as measured by Mediabase. Premiered on January 26, 2013, the Dance/Electronic Songs is a multi-metric chart ranking songs based on streaming, sales, and airplay from radio stations of all formats.

== Chart history ==
Key
†	Indicates top-performing song of 2013.

Chart history
Issue date	Dance/Electronic Songs			Dance Club Songs			Dance/Mix Show Airplay		
Issue date	Song	Artist(s)	Ref.	Song	Artist(s)	Ref.	Song	Artist(s)	Ref.
January 5	Not issued			"Finally Found You"	Enrique Iglesias featuring Sammy Adams		"Don't You Worry Child"	Swedish House Mafia featuring John Martin	
January 12	Not issued			"Gold"	Neon Hitch featuring Tyga		"Sweet Nothing" †	Calvin Harris featuring Florence Welch	
January 19	Not issued			"Big Banana"	Havana Brown featuring R3hab		"Don't You Worry Child"	Swedish House Mafia featuring John Martin	
January 26	"Scream & Shout"	will.i.am and Britney Spears		"I Found You"	The Wanted		"Sweet Nothing" †	Calvin Harris featuring Florence Welch	
February 2	"Scream & Shout"	will.i.am and Britney Spears		"Catch My Breath"	Kelly Clarkson		"Don't You Worry Child"	Swedish House Mafia featuring John Martin	
February 9	"Scream & Shout"	will.i.am and Britney Spears		"Beauty and a Beat"	Justin Bieber featuring Nicki Minaj		"Sweet Nothing" †	Calvin Harris featuring Florence Welch	
February 16	"Scream & Shout"	will.i.am and Britney Spears		"The Lucky Ones"	Kerli		"Don't You Worry Child"	Swedish House Mafia featuring John Martin	
February 23	"Scream & Shout"	will.i.am and Britney Spears		"Clarity"	Zedd featuring Foxes		"Don't You Worry Child"	Swedish House Mafia featuring John Martin	
March 2	"Harlem Shake" †	Baauer		"We Are Young"	Vassy		"Don't You Worry Child"	Swedish House Mafia featuring John Martin	
March 9	"Harlem Shake" †	Baauer		"Flavor"	Tori Amos		"Don't You Worry Child"	Swedish House Mafia featuring John Martin	
March 16	"Harlem Shake" †	Baauer		"I Could Be the One"	Avicii vs. Nicky Romero		"Don't You Worry Child"	Swedish House Mafia featuring John Martin	
March 23	"Harlem Shake" †	Baauer		"Oh Mama Hey"	Chris Cox and DJ Frankie featuring Crystal Waters		"Sweet Nothing" †	Calvin Harris featuring Florence Welch	
March 30	"Harlem Shake" †	Baauer		"Mama Mia"	Mayra Verónica		"Sweet Nothing" †	Calvin Harris featuring Florence Welch	
April 6	"Harlem Shake" †	Baauer		"As Your Friend"	Afrojack featuring Chris Brown		"Sweet Nothing" †	Calvin Harris featuring Florence Welch	
April 13	"Harlem Shake" †	Baauer		"Beam Me Up (Kill-Mode)"	Cazzette		"Sweet Nothing" †	Calvin Harris featuring Florence Welch	
April 20	"Harlem Shake" †	Baauer		"Heaven"	Depeche Mode		"Sweet Nothing" †	Calvin Harris featuring Florence Welch	
April 27	"Feel This Moment"	Pitbull featuring Christina Aguilera		"Hold Me"	Ono featuring Dave Audé		"Sweet Nothing" †	Calvin Harris featuring Florence Welch	
May 4	"Gentleman"	Psy		"Closer"	Tegan and Sara		"Alive"	Krewella	
May 11	"Feel This Moment"	Pitbull featuring Christina Aguilera		"I Need Your Love"	Calvin Harris featuring Ellie Goulding		"Alive"	Krewella	
May 18	"I Love It"	Icona Pop featuring Charli XCX		"Acid Rain"	Alexis Jordan		"Alive"	Krewella	
May 25	"I Love It"	Icona Pop featuring Charli XCX		"Next to Me" †	Emeli Sandé		"I Love It"	Icona Pop featuring Charli XCX	
June 1	"Get Lucky"	Daft Punk featuring Pharrell Williams		"Let There Be Love"	Christina Aguilera		"Get Lucky"	Daft Punk featuring Pharrell Williams	
June 8	"Get Lucky"	Daft Punk featuring Pharrell Williams		"Get Lucky"	Daft Punk featuring Pharrell Williams		"Get Lucky"	Daft Punk featuring Pharrell Williams	
June 15	"Get Lucky"	Daft Punk featuring Pharrell Williams		"Get Lucky"	Daft Punk featuring Pharrell Williams		"Get Lucky"	Daft Punk featuring Pharrell Williams	
June 22	"Get Lucky"	Daft Punk featuring Pharrell Williams		"Hold On"	NERVO		"Get Lucky"	Daft Punk featuring Pharrell Williams	
June 29	"Get Lucky"	Daft Punk featuring Pharrell Williams		"People Like Us"	Kelly Clarkson		"Get Lucky"	Daft Punk featuring Pharrell Williams	
July 6	"Get Lucky"	Daft Punk featuring Pharrell Williams		"Heart Attack"	Demi Lovato		"Get Lucky"	Daft Punk featuring Pharrell Williams	
July 13	"Get Lucky"	Daft Punk featuring Pharrell Williams		"Come & Get It"	Selena Gomez		"Get Lucky"	Daft Punk featuring Pharrell Williams	
July 20	"Get Lucky"	Daft Punk featuring Pharrell Williams		"Live It Up"	Jennifer Lopez featuring Pitbull		"Get Lucky"	Daft Punk featuring Pharrell Williams	
July 27	"Get Lucky"	Daft Punk featuring Pharrell Williams		"Body Party"	Ciara		"Get Lucky"	Daft Punk featuring Pharrell Williams	
August 3	"Get Lucky"	Daft Punk featuring Pharrell Williams		"Alive"	Empire of the Sun		"Get Lucky"	Daft Punk featuring Pharrell Williams	
August 10	"Get Lucky"	Daft Punk featuring Pharrell Williams		"Woman's World"	Cher		"Get Lucky"	Daft Punk featuring Pharrell Williams	
August 17	"Get Lucky"	Daft Punk featuring Pharrell Williams		"Right Now"	Rihanna featuring David Guetta		"Summertime Sadness"	Lana Del Rey	
August 24	"Get Lucky"	Daft Punk featuring Pharrell Williams		"Need U (100%)"	Duke Dumont featuring A*M*E		"Summertime Sadness"	Lana Del Rey	
August 31	"Applause"	Lady Gaga		"Wake Me Up!"	Avicii		"Summertime Sadness"	Lana Del Rey	
September 7	"Applause"	Lady Gaga		"Wake Me Up!"	Avicii		"Wake Me Up"	Avicii featuring Aloe Blacc	
September 14	"Applause"	Lady Gaga		"Skirt"	Kylie Minogue		"Summertime Sadness"	Lana Del Rey	
September 21	"Applause"	Lady Gaga		"Turn the Night Up"	Enrique Iglesias		"Summertime Sadness"	Lana Del Rey	
September 28	"Applause"	Lady Gaga		"Slow Down"	Selena Gomez		"Wake Me Up"	Avicii featuring Aloe Blacc	
October 5	"Applause"	Lady Gaga		"Applause"	Lady Gaga		"Wake Me Up"	Avicii featuring Aloe Blacc	
October 12	"Applause"	Lady Gaga		"Walking on Thin Ice 2013"	Ono		"Wake Me Up"	Avicii featuring Aloe Blacc	
October 19	"Applause"	Lady Gaga		"Live for the Night"	Krewella		"Wake Me Up"	Avicii featuring Aloe Blacc	
October 26	"Applause"	Lady Gaga		"Roar"	Katy Perry		"Wake Me Up"	Avicii featuring Aloe Blacc	
November 2	"Applause"	Lady Gaga		"Lose Yourself to Dance"	Daft Punk featuring Pharrell Williams		"Wake Me Up"	Avicii featuring Aloe Blacc	
November 9	"Applause"	Lady Gaga		"Flashing Lights"	Havana Brown		"Wake Me Up"	Avicii featuring Aloe Blacc	
November 16	"Applause"	Lady Gaga		"What Now"	Rihanna		"Wake Me Up"	Avicii featuring Aloe Blacc	
November 23	"Applause"	Lady Gaga		"Electricity & Drums (Bad Boy)"	Audé featuring Akon and Luciana		"Wake Me Up"	Avicii featuring Aloe Blacc	
November 30	"Applause"	Lady Gaga		"Youth"	Foxes		"Thinking About You"	Calvin Harris featuring Ayah Marar	
December 7	"Applause"	Lady Gaga		"Stay the Night"	Zedd featuring Hayley Williams		"Stay the Night"	Zedd featuring Hayley Williams of Paramore	
December 14	"Applause"	Lady Gaga		"Animals"	Martin Garrix		"Stay the Night"	Zedd featuring Hayley Williams of Paramore	
December 21	"Applause"	Lady Gaga		"All Night"	Icona Pop		"Stay the Night"	Zedd featuring Hayley Williams of Paramore	
December 28	"Applause"	Lady Gaga		"MacArthur Park 2013"	Donna Summer		"Stay the Night"	Zedd featuring Hayley Williams of Paramore	

== See also ==
- 2013 in American music
- List of Billboard Hot 100 number ones of 2013
