= Ba*Bing =

Single by Havana Brown

from the album Flashing Lights
- Released: 6 November 2015
- Genre: Tribal house, electropop
- Length: 3:40
- Label: Island Records Australia
- Songwriter(s): Angelique Meunier, Luciana Caporaso, Nick Clow, Carl Ryden
- Producer(s): Nick Clow

Havana Brown singles chronology
"Battle Cry" (2015)	"Ba*Bing" (2015)	"Like Lightning" (2016)

Music video
- "Ba*Bing" on YouTube

"Ba*Bing" is a song performed by Australian DJ and recording artist Havana Brown from her debut studio album Flashing Lights (2013). It was released as a promotional single from the album on 13 September 2013. The single was released on 6 November 2015 as the third single from Flashing Lights.

The recording, which takes its name from Brown's dog, was written by Brown, Luciana Caporaso, Carl Ryden and Nick Clow, with Clow producing the track. "Ba*Bing" debuted, and peaked, at number forty-six on the Australian ARIA Singles Charts in 2013.

== Background and reception ==
"Ba*Bing" was written by Havana Brown, together with Luciana Caporaso, Nick Clow and Carl Ryden, with Clow handling production. The track, which Brown notes as one of her favourites, is named after Brown's yorkshire terrier, who would often be in the studio with her during recording sessions. The song, which incorporates a bhangra beat, was described by Mike Wass from Idolator as "sexy" and "spin bone-rattling", and a writer for Take40 Australia called it "a quirky dance track".

"Ba*Bing" was released digitally on 13 September 2013, as a promotional single from her debut album Flashing Lights (2013). "Ba*Bing" debuted on the Australian ARIA Singles Chart at number forty-six on 24 September 2013, becoming her third song to chart within the top one hundred. The recording only spent one week on the charts. "Ba*Bing" also appeared on the ARIA Dance Charts, spending two weeks in the top twenty, and peaking at number nine.

The single was officially released on 6 November 2015.

== Video ==
Despite "Ba*Bing" not being released as an official single, a video clip premiered on Brown's VEVO account on Monday 8 September 2014, almost a year after it was first digitally released. The video was included on the single "Better Not Said", which was released in Australia on 12 September 2014.

== Track listings ==
Digital download
No.	Title	Length
1.	"Ba*Bing"	3:40

== Charts ==
=== Weekly charts ===
Chart (2013)	Peak position
Australia (ARIA)	46
Australian Artist Singles (ARIA)	6
Australia Dance (ARIA)	9

== Release history ==
Region	Type	Date	Format	Label
Australia	13 September 2013	Promotional Single	Digital download	Island Records Australia
Australia/ New Zealand	6 November 2015	Official Single	Digital download	Universal Music Australia
