= Flashing Lights (album) =

Studio album by Havana Brown
- Released: 11 October 2013
- Recorded: 2011–2013
- Genre: Pop; dance-pop; house; EDM; electropop
- Label: Island, Universal
- Producer: Niclas Kings, RedOne, Havana Brown, R3hab, Carl Ryden, Paul Harris, Darkchild, Afrojack, DJ Buddha

Havana Brown chronology
When the Lights Go Out (2012)	Flashing Lights (2013)

Singles from Flashing Lights
- 1. "Flashing Lights" Released: 23 August 2013; 2. "Warrior" Released: 27 September 2013; 3. "Ba*Bing" Released: 6 November 2015

Flashing Lights is the debut studio album by Australian recording artist Havana Brown. It was released on 11 October 2013 by Island Records Australia in Australia and New Zealand. The album was preceded by the singles "Flashing Lights" and "Warrior". The album debuted at number six ARIA Albums Chart and spent five weeks in the top 50.

== Background ==
Brown has been recording songs since 2011 and released an EP When the Lights Go Out with singles "We Run the Night", "You'll Be Mine" and "Big Banana" all being released from the EP.

== Release and promotion ==
=== Singles ===
The album's title track, "Flashing Lights" was released on 23 August 2013 as the album's lead single. It peaked at number 68 on the ARIA Singles Chart and number five on the US Hot Dance Club Songs chart. "Warrior" was released as the second single on 27 September 2013. It debuted on the ARIA Singles Chart at number 32 and peaked at number 11.

"Ba*Bing" was released on iTunes as the first promotional single from Flashing Lights on 13 September 2013. The song was released in November 2015 as the album's third single.

=== Oz Tour ===
Oz Tour
- Concert by Havana Brown
- Location: Australia, United States and Canada
- Associated album: Flashing Lights
- Start date: 26 October 2013
- End date: 1 January 2014
- No. of shows: 12

Brown embarked on her Oz Tour in October 2013 which included 12 shows in Australia, Canada and the United States. The tour concluded in Brisbane on 1 January 2014.

Date	City	Country	Venue
26 October 2013	Sydney	Australia	Marquee Nightclub
2 November 2013	Toorak	Australia	Trak Centre
9 November 2013	Atlantic City	United States	Haven Nightclub
15 November 2013	Miami Beach	United States	Mynt Lounge
16 November 2013	Santa Clara	United States	Taste Nightclub
23 November 2013	Uncasville	United States	Avalon
7 December 2013	Miami Beach	United States	Mynt Lounge
21 December 2013	Atlantic City	United States	Haven Nightclub
22 December 2013	Edmonton	Canada	YEG Dance Club
31 December 2013	Melbourne	Australia	RIVA
31 December 2013	Sydney	Australia	Sydney Harbour
1 January 2014	Brisbane	Australia	Eatons Hill Hotel

== Track listing ==
No.	Title	Writer(s)	Producer(s)	Length
1.	"Warrior"	Jonas Saeed; Niclas Kings; Luciana Caporaso; Nick Clow; Sabi	Kings	3:46
2.	"We Run the Night" (featuring Pitbull)	Cassie Davis; Snob Scrilla; RedOne; John Mamann; Yohanne Simon; Jean Claude Sindres	RedOne	3:48
3.	"Big Banana" (featuring R3hab & Prophet)	Brown; R3hab; AJ Junior; Rivington; Hajji; Lenssen; Rabon Brunings	Brown; R3hab	3:08
4.	"Ba*Bing"	Brown; Caporaso; Clow; Carl Ryden	Carl Ryden	3:40
5.	"Naughty"	Brown; Caporaso; Clow; Ryden; Paul Harris	Ryden; Harris	3:35
6.	"Flashing Lights"	Brown; RedOne; John Mamann; Sindres; Simon; Teddy Sky	RedOne	4:20
7.	"Any1"	Rodney Jerkins; Francesco Burali-Forti; Alicia Renee Williams	Darkchild	3:48
8.	"Someone to Love"	Ryden; Clow; Caporaso; Kenneth Karlin	Ryden	4:05
9.	"One More Time" (featuring Cave Kings)	Brown; Clow; Caporaso; Saeed; Kings	Kings	3:27
10.	"No Tomorrow"	Jerkins; Clow; Caporaso; Williams; Greg Morgan	Darkchild	3:29
11.	"Last Night" (Pitbull featuring Havana Brown & Afrojack)	Armando C. Perez; Urales Vargas; Anthony Preston	Afrojack; DJ Buddha	3:39
12.	"You'll Be Mine" (featuring R3hab)	RedOne; Hajji; Junior; R3hab; Fabian Lenssen; Addy Van Der Zwan; M.J. Lyrical; Mark Simmons	Brown; RedOne; R3hab	4:10

The Overdose Mix — Deluxe edition
No.	Title	Length
1.	"Flashing Lights"
2.	"Big Banana"
3.	"Spread a Little Love"
4.	"You'll Be Mine"
5.	"Get It"
6.	"We Run the Night"
Total length:		49:35

== Charts ==
=== Weekly charts ===
Chart (2013–14)	Peak position
Australian Albums (ARIA)	6
Japanese Albums (Oricon)	74

=== Year-end charts ===
Chart (2013)	Position
Australian Artist Albums Chart	41

== Release history ==
Country	Date	Format	Edition(s)	Label	Catalogue
Australia	11 October 2013	CD; digital download	Standard; deluxe	Island Records Australia	3755801 (standard)
New Zealand	11 October 2013	CD; digital download	Standard; deluxe	Island Records Australia	3755801 (standard)
Japan	12 March 2014	CD; digital download	Standard; deluxe	Island Records Australia	—N/a
