= Like Lightning (disambiguation) =

"Like Lightning" is a 2019 song by Foals.

Like Lightning may also refer to:

- "Like Lightning", a 2016 song by Havana Brown, featuring Dawin
- "Like Lightning", a 2016 song by Idina Menzel from her album Idina

== See also ==
- Lightning (disambiguation)
