= Billy Van (disambiguation) =

Billy Van (1934–2003) was a Canadian comedian, actor, and singer.

Billy Van may also refer to:

- Billy B. Van (1870–1950), American vaudeville entertainer
- Billy Van Heusen (born 1946), American former AFL- and NFL player
- Billy Van (musician), American DJ and music producer
- Billy Van Pelt (born 1966), American retired Dirt Modified racing driver
- Billy Van Zandt (born 1957), American playwright, actor, and author
