= You'll Be Mine (Havana Brown song) =

- R3hab Extended cover art

Single by Havana Brown featuring R3hab

from the album When the Lights Go Out and Flashing Lights
- Released: 17 July 2012
- Genre: Electro house
- Length: 4:10; 3:39 (radio edit)
- Label: Island, 2101 Records
- Songwriter(s): RedOne; Bilal "The Chef" Hajji; AJ Junior; R3hab; Fabian Lenssen; Addy Van Der Zwan; M.J. Lyrical; Mark Simmons
- Producer(s): Havana Brown; RedOne; R3hab

Havana Brown singles chronology
"Get It" (2012)	"You'll Be Mine" (2012)	"Big Banana" (2012)

Music video
- "You'll Be Mine" on YouTube

"You'll Be Mine" is a song by Australian DJ and recording artist, Havana Brown featuring Dutch DJ R3hab. It was released in July 2012 as the second single from her When the Lights Go Out EP. The song failed to impact the ARIA Singles Chart as sales counted towards the When the Lights Go Out EP.

An extended mix of the track, as well as a remix by R3hab and ZROQ was digitally released exclusively to Beatport on 21 September 2012 and was later released on Spotify.

== Song information ==
The pop/rock recording is an up-tempo song set in common time. It is written in the key of E major and moves at 127 beats per minute.

Brown described the inspiration behind "You'll Be Mine" saying, "when you're naive; when you don't necessarily know too much about someone, but you have a crush on them and in your mind you're dreaming about dating them, marrying them, having children, and you believe that they're perfect."

== Track listing ==
Official remixes
No.	Title	Length
1.	"You'll Be Mine" (R3hab Extended Mix)	5:42

== Certifications ==
Certifications for "You'll Be Mine"
Region	Certification	Certified units/sales
Australia (ARIA)	Platinum	70,000^{‡}
^{‡} Sales+streaming figures based on certification alone.
