= Whatever We Want =

Single by Havana Brown
- Released: 27 March 2014
- Recorded: Los Angeles
- Genre: Dance, EDM
- Length: 3:27
- Label: Island Records Australia
- Songwriter(s): Havana Brown, Richard Vission, Luciana Caporaso, Nick Clow, Ricky Luna and Myah Langston
- Producer(s): Richard Vission

Havana Brown singles chronology
"Warrior" (2013)	"Whatever We Want" (2014)	"Better Not Said" (2014)

Lyric video
- "Whatever We Want" on YouTube

"Whatever We Want" is a song by Australian DJ and recording artist Havana Brown.

"Whatever We Want" was released digitally on 27 March 2014. In Australia, the track debuted and peaked at number thirty-five on the ARIA Singles Chart, and thirteen on the ARIA Dance Singles Chart.

== Background and reception ==
"Whatever We Want" was written by Brown together with Richard Vission, Luciana Caporaso, Nick Clow, Ricky Luna and Myah Langston. Vission also produced the recording and Trevor Muzzy was responsible for the song's mixing. Recorded in Los Angeles during her tour in the United States, "Whatever We Want" samples Basement Jaxx's 2001 song "Where's Your Head At", which itself samples Gary Numan's track "M.E.". "Whatever We Want" was released digitally via iTunes Stores on 27 March 2014, as a stand-alone single.

On the week of 3 April 2014, "Whatever We Want" was the number one most added track on Australian radio. The single debuted and peaked on the Australian ARIA Singles Chart at number thirty-five on 7 April 2014, making it her eighth song to enter the top 100 and sixth top 40 chart appearance. The recording also debuted on the Australian ARIA Dance Chart at its peak, number thirteen.

== Formats and track listings ==
Digital download
No.	Title	Length
1.	"Whatever We Want"	3:27

== Charts ==
=== Weekly charts ===
Chart (2014)	Peak position
Australia (ARIA)	35
Australia Dance (ARIA)	13

== Release history ==
Region	Date	Format	Version	Label
Australia	27 March 2014	Digital download	Single	Island Records Australia/Universal Music Australia
