= Single White Female =

1992 film directed by Barbet Schroeder

- Theatrical release poster
- Directed by: Barbet Schroeder
- Screenplay by: Don Roos
- Based on: SWF Seeks Same by John Lutz
- Produced by: Barbet Schroeder
- Starring: Bridget Fonda; Jennifer Jason Leigh; Steven Weber; Peter Friedman
- Cinematography: Luciano Tovoli
- Edited by: Lee Percy
- Music by: Howard Shore
- Distributed by: Columbia Pictures
- Release date: August 14, 1992
- Running time: 108 minutes
- Country: United States
- Language: English
- Budget: $16 million
- Box office: $84.1 million

Single White Female is a 1992 American psychological erotic thriller film produced and directed by Barbet Schroeder from a screenplay by Don Roos. It is based on the 1990 novel SWF Seeks Same by John Lutz. The film stars Bridget Fonda and Jennifer Jason Leigh. It follows recently estranged Allison Jones (Fonda), who begins to rent an apartment room to Hedra Carlson (Leigh). After she reconciles with her ex-boyfriend, she begins to find strange patterns of behavior in her tenant.

Single White Female was released in the United States on August 14, 1992, by Columbia Pictures and was a box office success, grossing $84.1 million against a $16 million production budget. The film received mixed reviews from critics, although both Fonda and Leigh received praise for their performances. It was also successful in the home video market, finishing in the top 20 video rentals of 1993 in the United States. Released during the "golden age" of the erotic thriller, it became a cultural touchstone for later thrillers.

== Plot ==
New York City software designer Allison "Allie" Jones is engaged to Sam Rawson. Sam's ex-wife calls, and when it is revealed that he slept with her recently, Allie throws him out, breaking off their engagement. Her neighbor, aspiring actor Graham Knox, comforts her. The next morning, Allie attends a business lunch with Mitchell Myerson, a fashion house owner looking to buy her revolutionary new program. He pressures her into significantly reducing the price; as he is her first and only client, she accepts.

Allie advertises for a new roommate and settles on Hedra Carlson, whom she nicknames "Hedy," and they become friends. Hedy explains that her twin was stillborn and she is alone in the world. Hedy erases Sam's voicemail asking Allie to reconcile with him and buys a puppy named Buddy to console Allie, but becomes jealous when Sam wins Allie back and they seek a new apartment for themselves. Perceiving Allie as having rejected her, Hedy is upset and becomes further frustrated when Buddy does not come to her even when she coaxes him. Allie and Sam later find Buddy's corpse on the ground below her apartment's window. Returning to the apartment, Allie sees that the window was open with a gap wide enough for Buddy to get through. Hedy claims that Buddy's death was an accident because she had thought the bars outside the window had been fixed.

As Allie prepares for an evening meeting at Mitchell's company, she discovers that Hedy has bought copies of much of Allie's clothing. After the meeting, Mitchell tries to coerce Allie into performing sexual acts upon completing their deal, threatening to warn off future clients and not pay her, but she fights back and escapes. Seeing how distraught Allie is, Hedy calls Mitchell and threatens him. To comfort Allie, Hedy takes her to get a haircut, but after Hedy reveals that she has gotten a haircut and coloring to perfectly match Allie's, Allie is unnerved. That night, Allie follows Hedy to an underground sex club and witnesses Hedy using her name. Allie finds a shoebox containing letters addressed to Ellen Besch – Hedy's real name – along with a letter from Sam to Allie and a newspaper clipping on the drowning of Hedy's twin sister Judy when she was nine.

Disturbed by Hedy's behavior, Allie goes to Graham's apartment to seek advice. While she tells him the truth about Hedy, they are unaware that Hedy is listening. Hedy sneaks into Graham's apartment and, after Allie leaves, attacks Graham. When Sam returns the following night, Hedy goes to his hotel room, impersonates Allie, and performs oral sex on him. She begs him to leave Allie alone, but he refuses and insists on telling Allie the truth. Furious, Hedy kills him by stabbing him in the eye with her stiletto heel.

The following morning, Hedy is cleaning the apartment and moving her belongings out. Seeing a news report on Sam's death and finding the bloody stilettos, Allie realizes what has happened and tries to leave, but Hedy takes her hostage at gunpoint, explaining that everyone will believe Allie killed Sam. She reveals her intention to destroy Allie's reputation and force her to accept a role as Hedy’s new "sister."

Mitchell discovers that his accounting files are being erased by Allie's computer program and rushes to find Allie. He finds her bound and gagged with duct tape, but while he attempts to free her, Hedy shoots and kills him. She orders Allie to kill herself by swallowing pills, but Allie resists and fights back while trying to flee Graham's apartment. Graham regains consciousness and attacks Hedy before collapsing. Hedy shoots Allie in the shoulder, chases her, and seemingly strangles her to death in the elevator. She plans to dispose of the body in the basement incinerator, but Allie, having faked her death, tricks Hedy with a decoy before fatally stabbing her; Hedy collapses at Allie's feet and dies. In an epilogue, Allie narrates that she has finally moved on. She forgives Hedy for killing Sam and tries to forgive herself for the death of Hedy.

== Cast ==
- Bridget Fonda as Allison "Allie" Jones, a software designer
- Jennifer Jason Leigh as Hedra "Hedy" Carlson / Ellen Besch, Allie's roommate
  - Tiffany Mataras as young Ellen in the film's opening sequence
- Steven Weber as Sam Rawson, Allie's fiancé
- Peter Friedman as Graham Knox
- Stephen Tobolowsky as Mitchell Myerson
- Frances Bay as Elderly Neighbor
- Jessica Lundy as Talkative Applicant
- Renée Estevez as Perfect Applicant
- Ken Tobey as Desk Clerk
- Krystle Mataras as Judy Besch, Ellen's twin sister.

== Production ==
The Ansonia on New York City's Upper West Side was used for the exterior shots of the apartment block.

Following a poor test screening, the ending was reshot.

== Reception ==
=== Box office ===
Single White Female debuted at No. 2 at the US box office on its opening weekend behind Unforgiven, and grossed $48 million at the box office in the United States and Canada, while it grossed $36 million overseas, for a worldwide total of $84 million.

=== Critical response ===
On review aggregator Rotten Tomatoes, Single White Female holds an approval rating of 53% based on 49 reviews, with an average rating of 5.30/10. The site's critics consensus states "Single White Female benefits from a pair of outstanding leads, neither of whom are well served by a storyline that wavers between thrillingly tense and utterly ridiculous." Metacritic, which uses a weighted average, assigned the film a score of 63 out of 100, based on 25 critics, indicating "generally favorable" reviews. Audiences polled by CinemaScore gave the film an average grade of "B−" on an A+ to F scale.

Roger Ebert gave the film three stars out of four with the comment, "No genre is beyond redemption or beneath contempt, and here the slasher genre is given its due with strong performances and direction."

Hal Hinson of The Washington Post wrote:

Though Schroeder consciously evokes Hitchcock's Vertigo and Polanski's Rosemary's Baby, the movie conjures up less noble precursors as well, in particular The Hand That Rocks the Cradle, Basic Instinct and other recent psycho femme thrillers. What's remarkable, though, is how engrossing the marriage of these high- and low-brow elements turns out to be. The tension between its content and its trashy form is precisely the key to its vitality. If it were any less cheap, it wouldn't have the same edgy, gut-twisting jolt.

Jack Garner of Gannett News Service praised the film's visual appeal:

The cinematography of Luciano Tovoli plays evocatively with shadows and light, and the production design of Milena Canonero adds an important element to the mix – the large somewhat spooky New York apartment building that is as much a part of Single White Female as the Dakota was in Rosemary's Baby.

Bill Cosford of The Miami Herald wrote that the film largely depends on thriller genre conventions, "from she's-not-who-she-says-she-is to the venerable evil twin," and that "everyone winds up the victim of circumstance." Cosford notes that it matters little because both Fonda and Leigh "are so engrossing to watch," writing that Leigh "draws her character's psychopathology out slowly, inexorably, and winds up scaring the hell out of us," and that Fonda "is nearly as good in the harder part—she's straight woman to Leigh's frothing harpy—and utterly convincing as a savvy New Yorker."

Jennifer Jason Leigh won an MTV Movie Award for Best Villain, and was also nominated for a Chicago Film Critics Association Award for Best Actress.

The character of Hedy has been cited as an example of borderline personality disorder. She suffers from a markedly disturbed sense of identity, and tries to remedy it by adopting the wholesome attributes of her roommate. It is implied that she feels a deep-seated emptiness, while her fear of abandonment leads to drastic measures.

== Home media ==
Single White Female was released on VHS and LaserDisc on January 27, 1993, from Columbia TriStar Home Video, and eventually on DVD in February 1998. The film was released on Blu-ray from Scream Factory on November 13, 2018, featuring new interviews with director Barbet Schroeder, actors Steven Weber and Peter Friedman and screenwriter Don Roos, an audio commentary from Schroeder, editor Lee Percy and associate producer Susan Hoffman, and a theatrical trailer.

== Franchise ==
=== Sequel ===
The film was followed by a 2005 direct to video sequel, Single White Female 2: The Psycho, starring Kristen Miller, Allison Lange and Brooke Burns.

=== Remake ===
In March 2025, it was reported that a remake of the 1992 film is being produced by Sony Pictures and 3000 Pictures. Jenna Ortega and Taylor Russell were set to star and produced the remake. The following year, Sarah DeLappe is set to write and was produced by Stacey Sher and Marisa Paiva, with the film is now titled as Single Female.

=== Television series ===
In December 2016, NBC was developing a television adaptation of the film. As of March 2026, no further announcements has been made.

=== Related films ===
In India, a film titled Apartment was released in 2010, and is loosely based on the film. Another film titled The Roommate was released in 2011, starring Leighton Meester and Minka Kelly. This film served as a unofficial remake of the 1992 film. The television film titled Single Black Female, premiered on Lifetime in 2022, which was also inspired by the film. It is spawned two sequels, Single Black Female 2: Simone's Revenge in 2024, and Single Black Female 3: The Final Chapter in 2025.

=== Stage adaptation ===
A stage adaptation based on the film was adapted by Rebecca Reid and directed by Gordon Greenberg. It opened at Theatre Royal, Brighton in the United Kingdom on 9 January 2026 before embarking on a UK tour. It starred Lisa Faulkner and Kym Marsh as Allie and Hedy respectively.

== See also ==
- List of films featuring home invasions
