= When the Lights Go Out (EP) =

When the Lights Go Out EP

EP by Havana Brown
- Released: 17 July 2012
- Genres: EDM; pop
- Length: 17:56
- Labels: Island, Universal
- Producers: Chico Bennett; Havana Brown; Deekay; DJ Vice; Alex P; RedOne; R3hab; Sgt Slick; Richard Vission

Havana Brown chronology
| When the Lights Go Out EP (2012) | Flashing; Lights (2013) |

Singles from When the Lights Go Out
- 1. "We Run the Night" Released: 27 September 2011; 2. "You'll Be Mine" Released: 17 July 2012; 3. "Big Banana" Released: 4 December 2012; 4. "Spread a Little Love" Released: 7 June 2013

When the Lights Go Out EP is a five-song EP by Australian DJ and recording artist Havana Brown. It was released for digital download on 17 July 2012 by Island Records Australia as Brown's first EP. The Australian version of the EP includes five new songs, while the US version includes the international remix of "We Run the Night" featuring American rapper Pitbull. The track, being Brown's debut single, written by Cassie Davis and Snob Scrilla, and produced by RedOne, was released in September 2011 and became her first US top 40 hit, reaching number 26 on the Billboard Hot 100. The EP peaked at number 16 on the ARIA Singles Chart and was certified platinum.

== Background ==
In 2008, Havana Brown signed a recording deal with Universal Music Australia and began releasing her Crave compilation series through the label. Throughout 2008 and 2009, Brown toured as a supporting act for Rihanna, The Pussycat Dolls, Lady Gaga and Britney Spears during the Australian legs of their tours. By the end of 2009, Brown commenced working on Australian radio providing mixes for the Party People programme every Saturday night on the Today Network. Prior to the release of When the Lights Go Out, Brown released her debut single "We Run the Night" in 2011. The track peaked at number five in Australia and was certified triple platinum by the Australian Record Industry Association (ARIA) denoting 210,000 shipped copies. The song also charted in other countries including the United States where it peaked at number 26 on the Billboard Hot 100 and certified platinum by the Recording Industry Association of America (RIAA).

== Composition ==
The EP opens with "You'll Be Mine", a track inspired by a crush one feels towards another. The pop/rock recording is an up-tempo song set in common time. It is written in the key of E major and moves at 127 beats per minute. The song was written by AJ Junior, Addy Zwan, Bilal "The Chef" Hajji, Fabian Lenssen, M.J. Lyrical, Mark Simmons, R3hab and RedOne, with Brown, R3hab and RedOne handling production. Brown described the inspiration behind "You'll Be Mine" saying, "when you're naive; when you don't necessarily know too much about someone, but you have a crush on them and in your mind you're dreaming about dating them, marrying them, having children, and you believe that they're perfect." The next, "Spread a Little Love", is about negativity in the media, and how an act of kindness can positively affect someone. The electronic dance recording moves at 128 beats per minute and was written by RedOne, AJ Junior, Alex Papaconstantinou and Björn Djupström.

The third track on the EP, "One Way Trip", is about the unspoken connection with another person. The down-tempo r&b-dubstep song samples Robert Miles' 1995 single "Children". The EP's fourth track, "Big Banana", objectifies males in the same way they place "unrealistic shallow expectations" placed on girls by asking men if they have a "big banana". Brown cites "Short Dick Man" by 20 Fingers as an inspiration behind the song. The final track on the EP, "Wonderland (La Da Da Da Di)", samples "It's a Fine Day" by Miss Jane. On the international version of the EP, "We Run the Night" appears as the first track and "Wonderland (La Da Da Da Di)" is omitted.

== Reception ==
=== Critical response ===
When the Lights Go Out professional ratings
Review scores
| Source | Rating |
|---|---|
| ARTISTdirect | 5/5 stars |
| Only iPlus | 6/10 stars |
| Homorazzi | favourable |

The EP received favourable reviews. Rick Florino from ARTISTdirect, gave the EP five stars out of five, claiming the EP "shimmering dance floor ecstasy with stadium-size pop flare more seamlessly than any of her peers" and that "Brown has effectively bridged the gap between the club world and the mass market". David from Feed Limmy was more negative, stating he could only find one average song on the EP, this being "Big Banana", calling the other songs "rubbish". Josh from Only iPlus gave the EP six out of ten stars, stating the first tracks are better than the last two (Australian edition), praising the vocals but dishing the production and lyrics.

=== Chart performance ===
In Australia, When the Lights Go Out debuted at number 64 on the ARIA Singles Chart on 30 July 2012, and peaked at number 16 on 20 August 2012. It was certified platinum by the Australian Recording Industry Association (ARIA), denoting sales of 70,000 copies. In the United States, the EP debuted at number 50 on the Billboard Top Heatseekers chart issued 4 August 2012.

== Singles ==
The RedOne remix of "We Run the Night", featuring American rapper Pitbull, was released digitally in the United States on 27 September 2011 and elsewhere from 14 November 2011, as the lead single from When the Lights Go Out. The remix peaked at number one on the US Hot Dance Club Songs chart, number 15 on the US Pop Songs chart, and at number 26 on the US Billboard Hot 100 chart. "We Run the Night" was certified platinum by the Recording Industry Association of America (RIAA), denoting sales of 1,000,000 copies. The remix also appeared on singles charts in Canada, Czech Republic, Norway, and Slovakia.

"You'll Be Mine" was serviced to Australian radio stations on 17 July 2012 as the second single, and peaked at number 18 on the Australian National Radio Airplay chart. An extended mix of the track, as well as a remix by R3hab and ZROQ was digitally released exclusively to Beatport on 21 September 2012. The song failed to impact the ARIA Singles Chart because Universal Music Australia allowed When the Lights Go Out to appear on that chart, making all paid downloads of "You'll Be Mine" count towards the total sales of the EP. Anna Mastro directed the accompanying music video, which depicts Brown walking through streets in LA, throwing shoes on electrical wires in order to get her love interest to find her, eventually leading him to a roof top party.

"Big Banana", featuring R3hab and Prophet, was released as the third single on 4 December 2012. It peaked at number one on the US Hot Dance Club Songs chart, and at number 15 on the US Dance/Electronic Songs chart. In Australia, "Big Banana" peaked at number 18 on the ARIA Singles Chart, and at number three on the ARIA Dance Singles Chart. The song was certified gold by the Australian Recording Industry Association (ARIA), denoting sales of 35,000 copies. "Spread a Little Love" was released digitally via iTunes Stores on 7 June 2013 as a remix single, featuring remixes by Uberjak'd, Reece Low and Ed Coleman. An accompanying music video was directed by Einar Egilsson, who had previously worked with Brown on "Big Banana". As with "You'll Be Mine", sales for "Spread a Little Love" counted towards When the Lights Go Out, and therefore could not chart separately.

== Track listing ==
Australian edition
| No. | Title | Writer(s) | Producer(s) | Length |
|---|---|---|---|---|
| 1. | "You'll Be Mine" (featuring R3hab) | RedOne; Bilal "The Chef" Hajji; AJ Junior; R3hab; Fabian Lenssen; Addy Van Der Zwan; M.J. Lyrical; Mark Simmons | Havana Brown; RedOne; R3hab | 4:10 |
| 2. | "Spread a Little Love" | RedOne; AJ Junior; Alex Papaconstantinou; Björn Djupström | Brown; Alex P; RedOne | 3:52 |
| 3. | "One Way Trip" | Brown; Robert Miles; Richard Vission; Nick Clow; Luciana Caporaso; Eric Aguirre; Andrew Ramanauskas; Henry Olortegui | DJ Vice; Vission; Chico Bennett (co); Sgt Slick (co) | 3:23 |
| 4. | "Big Banana" (featuring R3hab and Prophet) | Brown; R3hab; AJ Junior; Rivington; Hajji; Lenssen; Rabon Brunings | Brown; R3hab | 3:09 |
| 5. | "Wonderland (La Da Da Da Di)" | Brown; Lars Halvor Jensen; Johannes Joergensen; Owain Barton | Deekay | 3:24 |
| Total length: | | | | 17:56 |

International edition
| No. | Title | Writer(s) | Producer(s) | Length |
|---|---|---|---|---|
| 1. | "We Run the Night" (featuring Pitbull) | Cassie Davis; Snob Scrilla; RedOne; John Mamann; Yohanne Simon; Jean Claude Sindres | RedOne | 3:48 |
| 2. | "You'll Be Mine" | RedOne; Hajji; AJ Junior; R3hab; Lenssen; Van Der Zwan; Lyrical; Simmons | Brown; RedOne; R3hab | 4:10 |
| 3. | "Spread a Little Love" | RedOne; AJ Junior; Papaconstantinou; Djupström | Brown; Alex P; RedOne | 3:52 |
| 4. | "One Way Trip" | Brown; Miles; Vission; Clow; Caporaso; Aguirre; Ramanauskas; Olortegui | DJ Vice; Vission; Bennett (co); Sgt Slick (co) | 3:23 |
| 5. | "Big Banana" (featuring R3hab and Prophet) | Brown; R3hab; AJ Junior; Rivington; Hajji; Lenssen; Brunings | Brown; R3hab | 3:09 |
| Total length: | | | | 18:22 |

== Charts and certifications ==
=== Weekly charts ===
| Chart (2012) | Peak position |
|---|---|
| ARIA Singles Chart | 16 |
| ARIA Dance Singles Chart | 2 |
| US Billboard Heatseekers Albums | 50 |

=== Year-end charts ===
| Chart (2012) | Position |
|---|---|
| Australian Artist Singles Chart | 15 |
| ARIA Dance Singles Chart | 20 |

=== Certifications ===
Certifications for When the Lights Go Out
| Region | Certification | Certified units/sales |
|---|---|---|
| Australia (ARIA) | Platinum | 70,000^{^} |
^{^} Shipments figures based on certification alone.

== Release history ==
| Region | Date | Format | Label |
|---|---|---|---|
| Japan | 16 July 2012 | Digital download | Island |
| Austria | 16 July 2012 | Digital download | Island |
| Belgium | 16 July 2012 | Digital download | Island |
| Finland | 16 July 2012 | Digital download | Island |
| France | 16 July 2012 | Digital download | Island |
| Germany | 16 July 2012 | Digital download | Island |
| Luxembourg | 16 July 2012 | Digital download | Island |
| Netherlands | 16 July 2012 | Digital download | Island |
| Portugal | 16 July 2012 | Digital download | Island |
| Australia | 17 July 2012 | Digital download | Island |
| Canada | 17 July 2012 | Digital download | Island |
| New Zealand | 17 July 2012 | Digital download | Island |
| Mexico | 17 July 2012 | Digital download | Island |
| United States | 17 July 2012 | Digital download | Island |
