= Greased Lightning =

Greased Lightning or Greased Lightnin' may refer to:

== Arts and entertainment ==
- Greased Lightning (1919 film), a silent comedy
- Greased Lightning (1928 film), an American silent Western
- Greased Lightning (1977 film), a biographical film about Wendell Scott
- "Greased Lightnin'" (song), from the musical Grease

== Other uses ==
- NASA GL-10 Greased Lightning, a 2014 unmanned aircraft
- Greased Lightning 150, 2007 American NASCAR race series
- Greased Lightning (professional wrestling), former name of tag team Pretty Deadly
- Greased Lightnin' or Greezed Lightnin', three separate installations of the Shuttle Loop roller coaster

== See also ==
- Lightning (disambiguation)
