= Warrior (Havana Brown song) =

Single by Havana Brown

from the album Flashing Lights
- Released: 27 September 2013
- Genre: Dance; electropop; techno; eurobeat; trap
- Length: 3:46; 3:18 (radio edit)
- Label: Island Records Australia
- Songwriters: Jonas Saeed, Niclas Kings, Luciana Caporaso, Nick Clow, Sabi
- Producers: Jonas Saeed & Niclas Kings

Havana Brown singles chronology
"Flashing Lights" (2013)	"Warrior" (2013)	"Whatever We Want" (2014)

Music video
- "Warrior" on YouTube

"Warrior" is a song by Australian DJ and recording artist Havana Brown. It is the second single from her debut studio album Flashing Lights (2013). The song peaked at number 11 on the ARIA Singles Chart and at number 3 on the Australia Dance chart. "Warrior" was certified double platinum by the Australian Recording Industry Association for sales of 140,000 copies. It also was a hit in the United States, peaking at number one on the US dance charts.

== Background and composition ==
"Warrior" was written by Jonas Saeed, Niclas Kings, Luciana Caporaso, Nick Clow and Sabi, Jonas Saeed & Niclas Kings also serving as the producer of the song. Discussing the theme of the song with Andrea Simpson from Celebuzz, Brown described "Warrior" as, "about fighting for what you want even if the odds are against you... Pushing forward when others who fear you are trying to bring you down". "Warrior" was released digitally via the iTunes Store on 27 September 2013, as the second single from Flashing Lights. The track was serviced to radio on 14 October 2013. Lyrically, Brown is asserting her toughness and dominance, stating "I am a fighter, it's in my DNA/step by step, and brick by brick, nobody stopping me...Strike like a tiger/I stand like a soldier, yeah/march like a champion!"

== Chart performance ==
"Warrior" debuted on the Australian ARIA Singles Chart at number 32 on 12 October 2013. After spending eleven weeks on the charts, the track peaked at number 11, staying there for one week. "Warrior" also appeared on the ARIA Dance Singles Chart, peaking at number three in the top twenty. The recording was certified triple platinum by the Australian Record Industry Association (ARIA), denoting 210,000 equivalent units sold in Australia. The song later peaked at number 1 on the US Hot Dance Club Songs chart (Billboard), becoming her fourth number one on that chart.

== Promotion ==
=== Music video ===
Brown leads her dancers in the music video for "Warrior."

The music video for "Warrior" was uploaded to YouTube on November 5, 2013. It features Brown and her backup dancers dancing in various warlike soldier costumes, including one seen in which Brown is wearing what resembles Ancient Greek battlements. The video also flashes back and forth between Brown and her dancers and a close-up shot of a beating drum, accompanied by the lines "Gonna feel my blood running wild and young; Gonna dance, dance, dance to the beat of my drum/Like a warrior."

=== Live performances ===
In 2013, Brown performed "Warrior" on The X Factor Australia and Dancing with the Stars Australia to support sales on the iTunes charts. Brown also performed the song when she embarked on her Oz Tour in October 2013 which included 12 shows in Australia, Canada and the United States. The tour concluded in Brisbane on 1 January 2014.

== Formats and track listings ==
Digital download
No.	Title	Length
1.	"Warrior"	3:46
2.	"Warrior" (Cave Kings Remix)	5:05
3.	"Warrior" (Extended Version)	5:00

Remixes
No.	Title	Length
1.	"Warrior" (Borgeous Remix)	4:42
2.	"Warrior" (Dave Aude Remix)	5:50
3.	"Warrior" (Urban Mix)	3:30
4.	"Warrior" (Fluke Remix)	5:43
5.	"Warrior" (Kronic Remix)	3:54
6.	"Warrior" (Ashley Wallbridge Remix)	6:25
7.	"Warrior" (Razor N Guido Remix)	6:53

== Charts ==
=== Weekly charts ===
Chart (2013)	Peak position
Australia (ARIA)	11
Australia Dance (ARIA)	3

Chart (2014)	Peak position
US Hot Dance Club Songs (Billboard)	1

=== Year-end charts ===
Chart (2013)	Position
ARIA Singles Chart	83
ARIA Dance Singles Chart	14
Australian Artist Singles Chart	11

Chart (2014)	Position
ARIA Dance Singles Chart	38
Australian Artist Singles Chart	42
US Dance Club Songs (Billboard)	40

== Certifications ==
Certifications for "Warrior"
Region	Certification	Certified units/sales
Australia (ARIA)	3× Platinum	210,000^{‡}
^{‡} Sales+streaming figures based on certification alone.

== Release history ==
Region	Date	Format	Label
Australia	27 September 2013	Digital download	Island Records Australia

== See also ==
- List of number-one dance singles of 2014 (U.S.)
