= John Lutz (mystery writer) =

American mystery writer (1939–2021)

- Born: John Thomas Lutz; September 11, 1939; Dallas, Texas, U.S.
- Died: January 9, 2021 (aged 81); Chesterfield, Missouri, U.S.
- Occupations: Novelist; short-story writer
- Spouse: Barbara Jean Bradley (m. 1958)
- Children: 3
- Writing career
- Years active: 1966–2019
- Genres: Mystery fiction; crime fiction; thriller
- Notable work: SWF Seeks Same
- Notable awards: Edgar Award; Shamus Award
- Website: www.johnlutzonline.com

John Thomas Lutz (September 11, 1939 – January 9, 2021) was an American author of mystery, crime and suspense fiction. During a career spanning more than fifty years, he published at least fifty books and approximately 250 short stories. His fiction ranged from private-eye and police-procedural stories to psychological thrillers and espionage novels.

Lutz was best known for SWF Seeks Same, adapted as the 1992 film Single White Female, and for series featuring the private investigators Alo Nudger, Fred Carver and Frank Quinn. He served as president of both the Mystery Writers of America (MWA) and the Private Eye Writers of America (PWA). His honors included an Edgar Award, two competitive Shamus Awards, the PWA's lifetime-achievement award and the Short Mystery Fiction Society's Golden Derringer for lifetime achievement.

== Early life ==
Lutz was born in Dallas to photographer John Peter Lutz and his wife, Jane. His family moved to St. Louis when he was four. He graduated from Southwest High School in 1957 and later attended Meramec Community College.

At age thirteen, Lutz read Ray Bradbury's short story "A Sound of Thunder" and became interested in how fiction could convey more than information. As a young adult, he worked as a theater usher, construction laborer, warehouseman, truck driver and civilian switchboard operator for the St. Louis Metropolitan Police Department. He later said that listening to police officers call in reports helped him understand how they thought.

== Writing career ==
=== Short fiction and early novels ===
Lutz spent several years submitting stories before selling "Thieves' Honor" to Alfred Hitchcock's Mystery Magazine, which published it in December 1966. His stories subsequently appeared in that magazine, Ellery Queen's Mystery Magazine, Mike Shayne Mystery Magazine and other periodicals. His first novel, The Truth of the Matter, was published in 1971. After being laid off from a truck-driving job in 1973, he became a full-time writer.

His work covered numerous branches of mystery and suspense writing, including private-eye fiction, police procedurals, psychological suspense, espionage, humor and the occult. Critics particularly associated him with tightly plotted stories and with protagonists and antagonists given detailed motives and personalities.

Lutz's office files included FBI material on serial killers and crime trends. He kept notes on police uniforms, patrol cars and city streets to use as background for his books.

=== Series and adaptations ===
Lutz introduced the St. Louis private investigator Alo Nudger in Buyer Beware (1976). He later created the disabled former police officer Fred Carver, whose cases were set in Florida, and the former New York homicide detective Frank Quinn. His final series followed intelligence operative Thomas Laker. Lutz continued writing stand-alone suspense novels alongside the series; his final novel, The Havana Game, was published in 2019.

Lutz's 1990 novel SWF Seeks Same was adapted as Single White Female, directed by Barbet Schroeder and starring Bridget Fonda and Jennifer Jason Leigh. The Ex (1996) became a 1997 HBO film, and Lutz co-wrote its screenplay with Larry Cohen. He also wrote narratives used in mystery-themed jigsaw puzzles.

He also invented the mystery board game Double Cross. By 1991, it had sold 40,000 copies.

=== Professional service and honors ===
Lutz served as president of both the Mystery Writers of America and the Private Eye Writers of America. The MWA gave him the 1986 Edgar Award for Best Short Story for "Ride the Lightning". He received the Shamus Award for Best P.I. Short Story for "What You Don't Know Can Hurt You" in 1983 and the Shamus Award for Best P.I. Hardcover Novel for Kiss in 1989. The PWA presented him and Robert B. Parker with its Eye lifetime-achievement award in 1995.

The French mystery association 813 honored the translated edition of Better Mousetraps in 1989. The Short Mystery Fiction Society gave Lutz its Golden Derringer for lifetime achievement in 2001, and the University of Missouri awarded him an honorary degree in 2007.

== Personal life and death ==
Lutz met Barbara Jean Bradley while both worked at a St. Louis movie theater. They married in 1958 and had three children. The family lived for many years in Webster Groves, Missouri, and Lutz and his wife later divided their time between the St. Louis area and Sarasota, Florida.

Friends and colleagues described Lutz as unpretentious, generous and fond of understated humor.

During the final eight years of his life, Lutz had dementia with Lewy bodies with symptoms of Parkinson's disease. He died from COVID-19 at a nursing home in Chesterfield, Missouri, on January 9, 2021, at age 81.

== Selected awards and nominations ==
The following list includes Lutz's major competitive awards and selected nominations.

Year	Work	Award	Result
1981	"Until You Are Dead"	Edgar Award for Best Short Story	Finalist
1983	"What You Don't Know Can Hurt You"	Shamus Award for Best P.I. Short Story	Won
1985	Nightlines	Shamus Award for Best P.I. Novel	Finalist
1986	"Ride the Lightning"	Edgar Award for Best Short Story	Won
1987	Tropical Heat	Anthony Award for Best Novel	Finalist
1988	Ride the Lightning	Shamus Award for Best P.I. Novel	Finalist
1989	Kiss	Shamus Award for Best P.I. Hardcover Novel	Won
1989	Better Mousetraps	Trophée 813 for best translated mystery-story collection	Won
1995	Career achievement	PWA Eye lifetime-achievement award	Honoree
2001	Career achievement	Golden Derringer lifetime-achievement award	Honoree
2003	The Night Watcher	Edgar Allan Poe Award for Best Paperback Original	Finalist
2010	Urge to Kill	International Thriller Writers Award for Best Paperback Original	Finalist
2011	Mister X	Shamus Award for Best Paperback Original	Finalist
2012	Serial	Shamus Award for Best Paperback Original	Finalist
2013	Pulse	Shamus Award for Best Paperback Original	Finalist

== Bibliography ==
Lutz wrote more than fifty novels. The lists below identify his principal series and a selection of his other novels and story collections.

=== Series ===
Series	Novels
Alo Nudger	Buyer Beware (1976); Nightlines (1984); The Right to Sing the Blues (1986); Ride the Lightning (1987); Dancer's Debt (1988); Time Exposure (1989); Diamond Eyes (1990); Thicker Than Blood (1993); Death by Jury (1995); Oops! (1998)
Fred Carver	Tropical Heat (1986); Scorcher (1987); Kiss (1988); Flame (1990); Bloodfire (1991); Hot (1992); Spark (1993); Torch (1994); Burn (1995); Lightning (1996)
Frank Quinn	Darker Than Night (2004); In for the Kill (2007); Night Kills (2008); Urge to Kill (2009); Mister X (2010); Serial (2011); Pulse (2012); Twist (2013); Frenzy (2014); Slaughter (2015)
Thomas Laker	The Honorable Traitors (2018); The Havana Game (2019)

=== Selected other novels ===
Year	Title	Notes
1971	The Truth of the Matter	First novel
1977	Bonegrinder	
1979	Lazarus Man	
1980	Jericho Man	
1981	The Shadow Man	
1982	Exiled	With Steve Greene
1984	The Eye	With Bill Pronzini
1988	Shadowtown	
1990	SWF Seeks Same	Reissued as Single White Female
1992	Dancing with the Dead	
1996	The Ex	Adapted as The Ex
1998	Final Seconds	With David August
2001	The Night Caller	
2002	The Night Watcher	
2003	The Night Spider	Later reissued as Night Victims
2005	Fear the Night	
2006	Chill of Night	

=== Short-story collections ===
- Better Mousetraps: The Best Mystery Stories of John Lutz, edited by Francis M. Nevins (St. Martin's Press, 1988)
- Shadows Everywhere (Mystery Scene Press, 1994)
- Until You Are Dead (Five Star, 1998)
- The Nudger Dilemmas (Five Star, 2001)
- Endless Road, and Other Stories (Five Star, 2003)
