= Better Not Said =

Single by Havana Brown
- Released: 12 September 2014
- Recorded: Los Angeles
- Genre: Dance, EDM
- Length: 3:38
- Label: Island Records Australia
- Songwriters: Havana Brown, Luciana Caporaso, Nick Clow, Lazonate Franklin, Niclas Kings, Jonas Saeed
- Producer: Richard Vission

Havana Brown singles chronology
"Whatever We Want" (2014)	"Better Not Said" (2014)	"No Ordinary Love" (2015)

Music video
- "Better Not Said" on YouTube

"Better Not Said" is a song by Australian DJ and recording artist Havana Brown.

Brown said the song has multiple meanings; “A lot of things are better not said,” she explained. “It is when you can keep control of a situation, from relationships to the bedroom to work. It is everything. Sometimes things are better on your own, doing it yourself.”

"Better Not Said" was released digitally on 12 September 2014. In Australia, the track debuted and peaked at number 79 on the ARIA Singles Chart.

== Background ==
"Whatever We Want" was written by Brown together with Richard Vission, Luciana Caporaso, Nick Clow, Lazonate Franklin, Niclas Kings and Jonas Saeed who had worked with Brown on her "Better Not Said" single.

== Music video ==
A music video to accompany the release of "Better Not Said" was first released on YouTube on 18 September 2014 at a total length of three minutes and forty-one seconds.

== Track listing ==
Digital download
No.	Title	Length
1.	"Better Not Said"	3:38
2.	"Better Not Said" (Toneshifterz Remix)	4:21
3.	"Better Not Said" (Timmy Trumpet Remix)	3:38
4.	"Ba*Bing" (video)	3:42

== Charts ==
"Better Not Said" debuted at No.81 and rose to its peak of No.79 the following week.

=== Weekly charts ===
Chart (2014)	Peak position
Australia (ARIA)	79

== Release history ==
Region	Date	Format	Version	Label
Australia	12 September 2014	Digital download	Single	Island Records Australia/Universal Music Australia
