= The Ex (1996 film) =

- Theatrical release poster
- Directed by: Mark L. Lester
- Screenplay by: Larry Cohen
- Based on: The Ex by John Lutz
- Produced by: Dana Dubovsky; Mark L. Lester
- Starring: Yancy Butler; Nick Mancuso; Suzy Amis
- Cinematography: Richard Leiterman
- Edited by: David Berlatsky
- Music by: Paul Zaza
- Production companies: American World Pictures (AWP); Lions Gate Films
- Distributed by: LIVE Entertainment
- Release dates: 10 October 1996 (Germany); 22 April 1997 (U.S. video)
- Running time: 87 minutes
- Countries: Canada; United States
- Language: English

The Ex is a 1996 psychological thriller film directed by Mark L. Lester and starring Yancy Butler, Nick Mancuso and Suzy Amis. It is based on the 1996 novel by John Lutz. The film was released on direct-to-video in Germany on October 10, 1996 and United States on April 22, 1997.

== Premise ==
Deidre Kenyon (Yancy Butler) is David Kenyon's (Nick Mancuso) ex-wife and intends to stalk him and wreck his family. She goes to extreme lengths to do this.

== Cast ==
- Yancy Butler as Deidre Kenyon
- Suzy Amis Cameron as Molly Kenyon
- Nick Mancuso as David Kenyon
- Hamish Tildesley as Michael Kenyon
- John Novak as Miles Endicott
- Roger Barnes as Sam Beltzer
- Babz Chula as Dr. Lillian Jonas
- Barry W. Levy as Frank
- Claire Riley as Detective Lang
- Tom Pickett as Kenyon's Doorman
- Allison Warren as Hotel Clerk
- Arlene Belcastro as Next Door Neighbor
- Barry 'Bear' Horton as Biker

== Production ==
Filming took place in Vancouver and Richmond, British Columbia as well as Toronto, Ontario.

Lester said the film "is one of my favorite movies I've made because it has a real European sensibility: really good characters and the scenes between the characters are really well developed. It's an exciting movie and there's lots of suspense."
