= SWF Seeks Same =

1990 thriller novel by John Lutz

- First edition cover
- Author: John Lutz
- Genre: Thriller
- Publisher: St. Martin's Press
- Publication date: October 1, 1990
- ISBN: 0-795-31022-6

SWF Seeks Same (1990; later retitled Single White Female) is a thriller novel by American writer John Lutz. The story concerns a woman whose new roommate seems perfect until the roommate starts copying her, eventually seeking to take over her life and identity completely.

== Plot summary ==
Allie Jones is a freelance "computer programmer consultant" who lives in an apartment building in Manhattan that strictly forbids subleasing and apartment sharing. She has been in a serious relationship with Sam Rawson for six months. He moved in with Allie two months ago, but they need to hide their living arrangement from the other tenants.

Allie is hired by Mike Mayfair to set up a computer system for his business. Soon after, Allie discovers that Sam has been unfaithful and breaks up with him. Unable to afford the rent by herself, she places an ad in the classifieds: "SWF seeks same".

Graham Knox is a playwright who pays the bills by working as a waiter. He lives above Allie and can hear everything that goes on in her apartment through the ductwork. On the day she places her roommate ad, Allie eats lunch in the restaurant where Graham works, and he introduces himself as her upstairs neighbour.

Allie ends up choosing Hedra Carlson as her new roommate. Their roommate relationship is smooth, except that Allie is uncomfortable with the way that Hedra openly idolises her. A few weeks after Hedra moves in, Allie receives the first obscene phone call. Graham and Allie strike up a friendship, and Graham accidentally admits that he knows about Allie's secret roommate. Allie tentatively reconciles with Sam.

Allie comes home crying after Mayfair propositions her. He hired Allie with the intention of coercing her into having sex with him by withholding the full payment. Allie refuses him, but she is worried about the lost income. Hedra comforts her. Allie discovers her I.D. and credit cards missing, which—in addition to the obscene phone calls—she reports to the police. In the process, she meets Detective Sergeant Kennedy.

Allie notices that Hedra is now also imitating the way she walks and moves, not just the way she dresses. When Allie finds a wig that matches her hairstyle in Hedra's room, she decides to ask Hedra to move out. Before she leaves, Hedra learns that Graham knows Hedra has been living with Allie. A few days after Sam moves back in, Allie comes home early from work and catches Sam and Hedra having sex in Allie's bed. Sam has replaced Allie with Hedra. Allie tells Sam to leave.

A while later, Hedra telephones, sounding strange. Allie becomes scared for Sam's safety, finds Sam dead, and realises Hedra intends to frame Allie for Sam's murder. Allie hides from the police. The next day, Allie steals some valuables from Mike Mayfair to sell for cash, and reads in the newspaper that Graham is dead. Allie calls Kennedy and tells him about Hedra. A few days later, Allie is found and charged with murder.

Hedra, thinking she has gotten away with Sam's murder, moves into Allie's old apartment. Later, Hedra comes home and finds Allie and Kennedy waiting on her sofa. Kennedy reveals that a woman named Meredith Hedra Carlson had been murdered six months ago and that Graham had started writing a new play based on notes he kept about what he heard through the ductwork.

After Hedra is arrested, Allie leaves New York and returns to Illinois.

== Film adaptation ==
The novel was the basis for the film Single White Female in 1992. The film added the "twin sister" motive, which does not appear in the book.

== Publication history ==
Originally published in 1990 as SWF Seeks Same, the title was changed in 1992 to match the title of the film adaptation: Single White Female. The retitled novel, using the movie poster as the cover art, was then released as a movie tie-in edition.

The novel was re-released as an e-book in September 2011.
