= John Mamann =

French singer, songwriter and composer (born 1978)

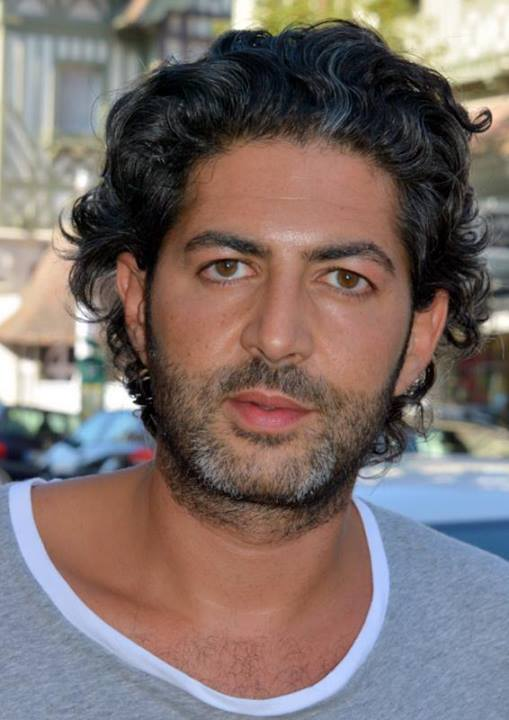
- John Mamann (2013)

Background information
- Born: Jonathan Maman; 29 September 1978 (age 47); France
- Genres: Chanson, pop
- Occupations: Singer, songwriter, musician, record producer
- Years active: 2009 – present
- Label: AZ
- Website: www.johnmamann.com

Jonathan Maman (French pronunciation: [ʒɔnatɑ̃ mamɑ̃]; born September 29, 1978), better known by his stage name John Mamann (French: [maman]), is a French singer, songwriter and composer who is signed to AZ, part of Universal Music. He has released three albums, Mister Joe in 2010, self-titled Joe Mamann in 2012 and Love Life in 2013. The title track from the last album "Love \ Life", a duo with Portuguese singer Kika, has charted on French Singles Chart.

== Career ==
At age 18, John Mamann left for Canada and later on to the States (Miami, Florida) to pursue a musical career. His father, a musician and relatively successful singer, with Moroccan descent, had great impact on him. Returning to France, his debut single was "Pas jaloux". He was more successful with composing particularly after his success in 2008 with writing and producing Louisy Joseph and finding chart success with the latter's song "Assis par terre". He released his own album Mister Joe with all materials composed by him with lyrics from Elodie Hesme, François Welgryn, Lionel Florence et Florian Gazan.

Mamann has also written to a number of artists including Johnny Hallyday (in two songs "Autoportrait" and "Devant toi"), for Florent Pagny, Natasha St-Pier, Luce, Jean-Roch, Havana Brown and others. He has collaborated with producer RedOne. In 2011, he co-wrote and co-produced "Il nous faut", a big hit for French singer Elisa Tovati and Belgian The X Factor runner-up Tom Dice. The single reached number 1 on both Belgian Flanders and Wallonia Singles Charts.

He also co-composed with David Hallyday, Fred Château, Mathieu Mendès, Corneille, Shaka Ponk, Coyle Girelli and Stanislas, music for the 2013 French musical production Robin des Bois.

== In popular culture ==
- He was part of Collectif Paris-Africa, and contributed to the album Paris-Africa and one of the artists featured on "Des Ricochets", the main charity single for UNICEF from the album.
- In 2012, he also took in the 8th edition of the annual event Concert pour la tolérance in Agadir, Morocco.
- In 2012, in season 1 of the French singing competition The Voice: la plus belle voix, Florent Pagny one of the four judges and mentors in the series chose John Mamann to help him mentor his team of contestants during the "Musical Battles" round.

== Personal life ==
His father, Maurice Mamann is a musician and singer who performed under the stage name Maurice Mann.

== Discography ==
=== Albums ===
Year	Album	Peak positions	
Year	Album	FR	BEL (Wa)
2010	Mister Joe	149	–
2012	John Mamann	85	192
2013	Love Life	103	TBA

=== Singles ===
Year	Single	Peak positions			Album
Year	Single	FR	BEL (Wa)	SWE	Album
2010	"15h du matin" (with Grand Corps Malade)	50	—	—	
2013	"Love \ Life" (feat. Kika)	28	3* (Ultratip)	59	Love Life
2017	"Tu la regardes" (feat. Maître Gims)	67	—	—	

*Did not appear in the official Belgian Ultratop 50 charts, but rather in the bubbling under Ultratip charts.

Others

- 2009: "Pas jaloux"
- 2009: "Donnez-moi le sens"
- 2010: "On est tous comme ça"
- 2012: "Fais pas la gueule John"
- 2012: "Allez viens"

== Compositions and music productions ==
(Selective listing. Contains individual as well as co-composing and co-producing)

- 2008: Louisy Joseph – La Saison des amours (album production) + singles "Mes insomnies" and "Assis par terre"
- 2008: Natasha St-Pier – Natasha St-Pier (6 tracks including single "Embrasse-moi")
- 2010: Florent Pagny – "8e merveille", "J'ai arrêté de rêver"
- 2011: Johnny Hallyday – "Autoportrait"
- 2011: Luce feat. Orelsan – "La Machine"
- 2011: Elisa Tovati & Tom Dice – "Il nous faut"
- 2012: Love Generation – "Just a Little Bit"
- 2012: Jean-Roch featuring Pitbull and Nayer – "Name of Love"
- 2012: Johnny Hallyday – "Devant toi"
- 2012: Far East Movement featuring Justin Bieber – "Live My Life"
- 2013: Khaled – "Laila"
- 2013: Havana Brown – "Flashing Lights"
- 2013: Havana Brown feat. Pitbull – "We Run the Night"
- 2013: Robin des Bois (a French musical)
- 2014: Ayumi Hamasaki - "XOXO"
