= Lightning Peak =

Lightning Peak may refer to:

- Lightning Peak (British Columbia)
- Lightning Peak (Bonner County, Idaho)
- Lightning Peak (Valley County, Idaho)
- Lightning Peak (Lincoln County, Montana)
- Lightning Peak (Mineral County, Montana)
- Lightning Peak in Mineral County, Montana
- Lightning Peak (Utah)
- Lightning Peak (Washington)
