= Lightning (Lutz novel) =

1996 novel by John Lutz

- Author: John Lutz
- Language: English
- Genre: Detective fiction
- Publisher: Henry Holt and Company
- Publication date: June 1, 1996
- Publication place: United States
- Pages: 288
- ISBN: 0-8050-4379-9
- Preceded by: Burn

Lightning is a 1996 detective novel by American mystery writer John Lutz, the 10th novel in his Fred Carver series. When the reporter Beth Jackson, who was carrying the titular private detective's child, is injured in a bombing at an abortion clinic, Carver suspects that the true culprit is not the anti-abortion fanatic that was arrested following the official investigation, and works to solve the mystery while dealing with the grief of his stillborn child.

== Plot ==
Beth Jackson, an African-American reporter in a relationship with former police officer and current private detective Fred Carver, finds out she is pregnant. She initially plans to get an abortion, but when she later decides against it she visits the clinic in-person to cancel her appointment. Just as she arrives she is injured by a bomb that kills a doctor, a patient, and her unborn child. A member of an anti-abortion group known as "Operation Alive" is arrested for the crime after an investigation by the police and the FBI. They vocally support the act of the bombing but deny being the one who did it themselves, and although the official investigators believe they have solved the case, Carver does not believe that they are the true or sole culprit. Later, another clinic is destroyed by a bomb, while Jackson and Carver are targeted by an unknown religious fanatic.

== Publication history ==
Lightning was first published by Henry Holt and Company on June 1, 1996, and in audiobook by Books on Tape. It is the 10th novel in John Lutz's Fred Carver detective novel series, preceded by Burn, and the final novel in the series.

== Reception ==
Lightning received generally positive reviews. Critics praised how it covered the "higly flammable" topic of abortion and the surrounding social issues in the United States. The plot was generally well received and seen as fast moving and engaging, especially at its climax, although Kirkus Reviews considered the mystery to be largely back-loaded. Publishers Weekly praised the depth of the characters and their emotions, referring to the officer heading the investigation, William McGregor, as "one of the most unsavory police officers in the genre", while also praising the emotional depth present in Carver and Jackson dealing with the emotional loss of their child.

Reviewing the audiobook from Books on Tape, the St. Louis Post-Dispatch's Dick Richmond praised the story but was critical of the reading itself, writing that the narrator had "the emotional range of a cardboard box".
