= Get It (Havana Brown song) =

Single by Havana Brown
- B-side: "We Run The Night (RedOne Remix)"
- Released: 9 September 2011
- Genre: Electro house; dance; electropop
- Length: 3:40
- Label: Island
- Songwriters: Cassie Davis; Snob Scrilla
- Producer: More Mega

Havana Brown singles chronology
"We Run the Night" (2011)	"Get It" (2011)	"You'll Be Mine" (2012)

Music video
- "Get It" on YouTube

"Get It" is a song by Australian DJ and recording artist Havana Brown. It was written and produced by Cassie Davis and Snob Scrilla of production duo More Mega, and was released digitally on 9 September 2011.

== Background and release ==
"Get It" was co-written and produced by Cassie Davis and Snob Scrilla of production duo More Mega, who had worked on Havana Brown's previous single "We Run the Night". In an interview with Jonathon Moran of the Daily Telegraph, Brown described the central theme of the track as a: "feel-good, party song... about going out there and having a good time", likening it to a "Las Vegas anthem". "Get It" was released digitally via iTunes Stores on 9 September 2011, as a non-album single. A digital extended play was also released via iTunes, featuring remixes of "Get It" and the RedOne remix of "We Run the Night". The recording debuted and peaked on the ARIA Singles Chart at number 38 on 25 September 2011. "Get It" also appeared on the ARIA Dance Singles Chart, peaking at number six.

== Music video ==
Brown said that the music video for "Get It" was toned down, elaborating "The final edit is extremely tame compared to the footage filmed. It was very raunchy and I like that."

== Track listing ==
- Digital download
1. "Get It" – 3:40
- Digital EP
1. "Get It" (Bombs Away Remix) – 5:57
2. "We Run the Night" featuring Pitbull (RedOne remix) – 3:48
3. "Get It" (Rave Radio Remix) – 5:18
4. "Get It" (Krunk Remix) – 5:11
- Other official remixes
1. "Get It" featuring Lil Jon (Remix) – 3:42
2. "Get It" featuring Lil Jon (Remix Extended Edit) – 4:07
3. "Get It" (Extended Edit) – 4:29
4. "Get It/We Run The Night" (Mashup) – 2:57

== Charts ==
Chart (2011)	Peak position
Australia (ARIA)	38
Australia Dance (ARIA)	6

== Certifications ==
Region	Certification	Certified units/sales
Australia (ARIA)	Gold	35,000^{^}
^{^} Shipments figures based on certification alone.

== Release history ==
Region	Date	Format	Label
Australia	9 September 2011	Digital download	Universal Music Australia
Australia	7 October 2011	Digital EP	Universal Music Australia
