= Lightning (Atlanta) =

Coordinates: 33.760°N 84.400°W

Lightning was a neighborhood just west of Downtown Atlanta, Georgia, north of the former extension of Magnolia Street, south of Simpson St. (now Joseph E. Boone Blvd.) and east of Northside Drive (US 41). It was razed to make way mostly for the expansion of the Georgia World Congress Center as well as the Georgia Dome, and the area later became home to Mercedes-Benz Stadium .

As of 1975, east-west streets in Lighting were, from north to south: Simpson St. (northern border), Tyler St., Rock St., Mayes St., Thurmond St. Newton St., Foundry St., Magnolia Street (southern border) North-south streets in Lightning were, from west to east: Northside Dr. (western border), Haynes St., Mangum St., Elliott St. (eastern border).
