= Loughborough Lightning =

Loughborough Lightning may refer to one of three women's sports teams based at Loughborough University:

- Loughborough Lightning (netball)
- Loughborough Lightning (cricket)
- Loughborough Lightning (rugby union)
