= Operation Lightning =

Operation Lightning may refer to one of the following military operations:

- A full-scale amphibious landing by the 74th Indian Brigade of the British Indian Army and the 3rd Commando Brigade of the British Army in Burma during the Second World War.
- Operation Barak (lit. lightning), a Jewish operation in the 1947–1948 Palestine War
- A coalition counter-insurgency operation in Baghdad in the Iraq War (see List of coalition military operations of the Iraq War)
