= Billy Van (musician) =

- Origin: Bloomington, Indiana
- Genres: Dubstep, drum and bass, electro house, glitch hop, moombahton
- Occupations: Music producer, DJ
- Years active: 2009–present
- Website: billyvanmusic.com

Billy Van is an American DJ and music producer from Bloomington, Indiana, where he studied recording arts at Indiana University. The Billy Van MashUps! was Billy Van's introduction as a mixer and producer. These tracks consisted of taking pop hits and reconstituting them together "harmonically and lyrically," with new vocals and his own production.

Billy Van released an EP featuring remixes of LMFAO, Breathe Carolina, Chris Brown, Lights, and Eiffel 65, entitled The Cardigan EP. Partnering with BitTorrent and uTorrent, Billy Van released this EP along with its instrumental-only counterpart as a featured media bundle, downloadable for free. This promotion campaign resulted in a total of over 7 million downloads.

Billy Van released his first full-length album, Retro Punch, in October 2012. Retro Punch debuted at number 61 in the iTunes Top 100 Dance Charts. Prior to releasing the album, Billy Van released his first single "Can't Explain," with an official music video.

== Discography ==
=== Albums & EPs ===
- The Cardigan EP - Fact Music Group - February 28, 2012
- Retro Punch - Fact Music Group - October 23, 2012
