= Big Banana (song) =

Single by Havana Brown featuring R3hab and Prophet

from the album When the Lights Go Out and Flashing Lights
- Released: 4 December 2012
- Genre: Electro house
- Length: 3:09
- Label: Island, 2101 Records
- Songwriters: Havana Brown; Rabon Brunings; Mika Guillory; Bilal "The Chef" Hajji; AJ Junior; Fabian Lenssen; R3hab; Rivington
- Producers: Havana Brown; R3hab

Havana Brown singles chronology
"You'll Be Mine" (2012)	"Big Banana" (2012)	"Spread a Little Love" (2013)

Music video
- "Big Banana" on YouTube

"Big Banana" is a song by Australian DJ and recording artist Havana Brown featuring Dutch DJ R3hab and rapper Prophet. It was released in December 2012 as her fourth single overall, the second from her When the Lights Go Out EP. The song peaked at number one on the US Hot Dance Club Songs chart, and at number 18 on the Australian ARIA Singles Chart.

== Song information ==
=== Background ===
In an interview, Brown stated the concept behind the song "Big Banana" as a way to objectify men after the "unrealistic shallow expectations" placed on girls, whereas she counters that in "Banana" by asking if the male has "a big banana." She added that the song was "a fun song for the girls and the gay boys." In an early March 2013 radio interview with Nova, Brown stated she was inspired by the 20 Fingers 1994' hit single "Short Dick Man", and that was the base of her creating the idea of recording "Big Banana."

=== Reception ===
The song was met with mixed reviews from music critics. David from Feed Limmy stated he could only find one average song on the When the Lights Go Out EP, this being "Big Banana", calling the other songs "rubbish". "Big Banana" debuted at number 33 on the US Hot Dance Club Songs chart dated 15 December 2012, and peaked at number one in the issue dated 19 January 2013. In Australia, the track debuted on the ARIA Singles Chart at number 72 in the week of 4 March 2013 and moved up to number 38 the following week. It peaked at number 18 on 8 April 2013. "Big Banana" also entered the ARIA Dance Singles Chart at number 16 on 4 March 2013, and peaked at number two on 22 April 2013. It was certified platinum by the Australian Recording Industry Association (ARIA) for sales of 70,000 copies. One analyst described the song as promoting the objectification of men with macrophallism.

== Music video ==
The music video for "Big Banana" was shot on 20 February 2013 at the Encino Hills in Los Angeles, United States. The video was directed by Icelandic software developer Einar Egilsson. Brown spoke about the music video: "The clip reflects everything about the song - it's fun, upbeat, tongue-in-cheek; it's dirty but fun at the same time." American model and actor Nick Baga plays her love interest in the music video. The music video premiered on 15 March 2013 on V-Music.

== Track listing ==
Digital Remix EP
No.	Title	Length
1.	"Big Banana" (R3hab Remix)	3:33
2.	"Big Banana" (Dave Audé Remix)	7:28
3.	"Big Banana" (Dave Audé Dub)	7:13
4.	"Big Banana" (J-Trick vs Havana Brown Remix)	4:52

Other official remixes
No.	Title	Length
1.	"Big Banana" (Extended Mix)	4:30
2.	"Big Banana" (No Rap Extended Mix)	4:30
3.	"Big Banana" (Dave Audé Radio Mix)	3:39
4.	"Big Banana" (Dave Audé Mixshow)	6:06

== Charts and certification ==
=== Weekly charts ===
Chart (2012–13)	Peak position
Australia (ARIA)	18
Australia Dance (ARIA)	2
Belgium (Ultratip Bubbling Under Wallonia)	25
US Hot Dance Club Songs (Billboard)	1

=== Year-end charts ===
Chart (2013)	Position
ARIA Dance Singles Chart	24
Australian Artist Singles Chart	17
US Hot Dance Club Songs (Billboard)	50

== Certifications ==
Region	Certification	Certified units/sales
Australia (ARIA)	Platinum	70,000^{^}
^{^} Shipments figures based on certification alone.

== Release history ==
Region	Date	Format	Version	Label
Australia	4 December 2012	Digital download	Remixes EP	Universal Republic Records
United States	18 December 2012	Digital download	R3hab Extended Mix	Universal Republic Records
United States	18 December 2012	Digital download	Dave Audé Radio Mix	Universal Republic Records

== See also ==
- List of number-one dance singles of 2013 (U.S.)
