= Lightning Comics =

Lightning Comics may refer to:

- Lightning Comics (1940-1942), an Ace Magazines comic starring Lash Lightning
- Lightning Comics (1967), a defunct comic book company
- Lightning Comics (1990s), an independent comic book company
