= We Run the Night =

- Cover for the main single version

Single by Havana Brown

from the album When the Lights Go Out and Flashing Lights
- Released: 29 April 2011 (original release) 27 September 2011 (re-release for Pitbull) 17 December 2011 (international release)
- Recorded: 2011
- Genre: Dance-pop; Dutch house
- Length: 3:36
- Label: Island
- Songwriters: Cassie Davis; Sean Ray "Snob Scrilla" Mullins
- Producer: More Mega

Havana Brown singles chronology
"We Run the Night" (2011)	"Get It" (2011)

Pitbull singles chronology
"U Know It Ain't Love" (2011)	"We Run the Night" (2011)	"Rock the Boat" (2011)

Music videos
- "We Run the Night" on YouTube; "We Run the Night" (remix) on YouTube

"We Run the Night" is a song by Australian DJ and recording artist Havana Brown, written and produced by Cassie Davis and Snob Scrilla of production duo More Mega. It was released for digital download on by Island Records (Universal Music Australia) as Brown's debut single. The song was included on the EP When The Lights Go Out as well as Brown's debut studio album Flashing Lights.

"We Run the Night" received a mixed to positive reception from critics. The song peaked at number five on the ARIA Singles Chart and the Official New Zealand Music Chart and was certified triple platinum by the Australian Recording Industry Association (ARIA). The RedOne remix of the song, featuring American rapper Pitbull, peaked at number 26 on the US Billboard Hot 100 and number one on the US Hot Dance Club Songs chart. "We Run the Night" was certified platinum by the Recording Industry Association of America (RIAA), denoting sales of 1,000,000 copies. The remix also appeared on singles charts in Canada, Czech Republic, Norway, and Slovakia.

The accompanying music video for "We Run the Night" was directed by Benn Jae and Tony Prescott, and premiered on Vevo on 1 June 2011. The music video for the RedOne remix premiered on Vevo on 7 March 2012.

== Background and composition ==
"We Run the Night"
A 25-second sample from the RedOne remix of Havana Brown's "We Run the Night."

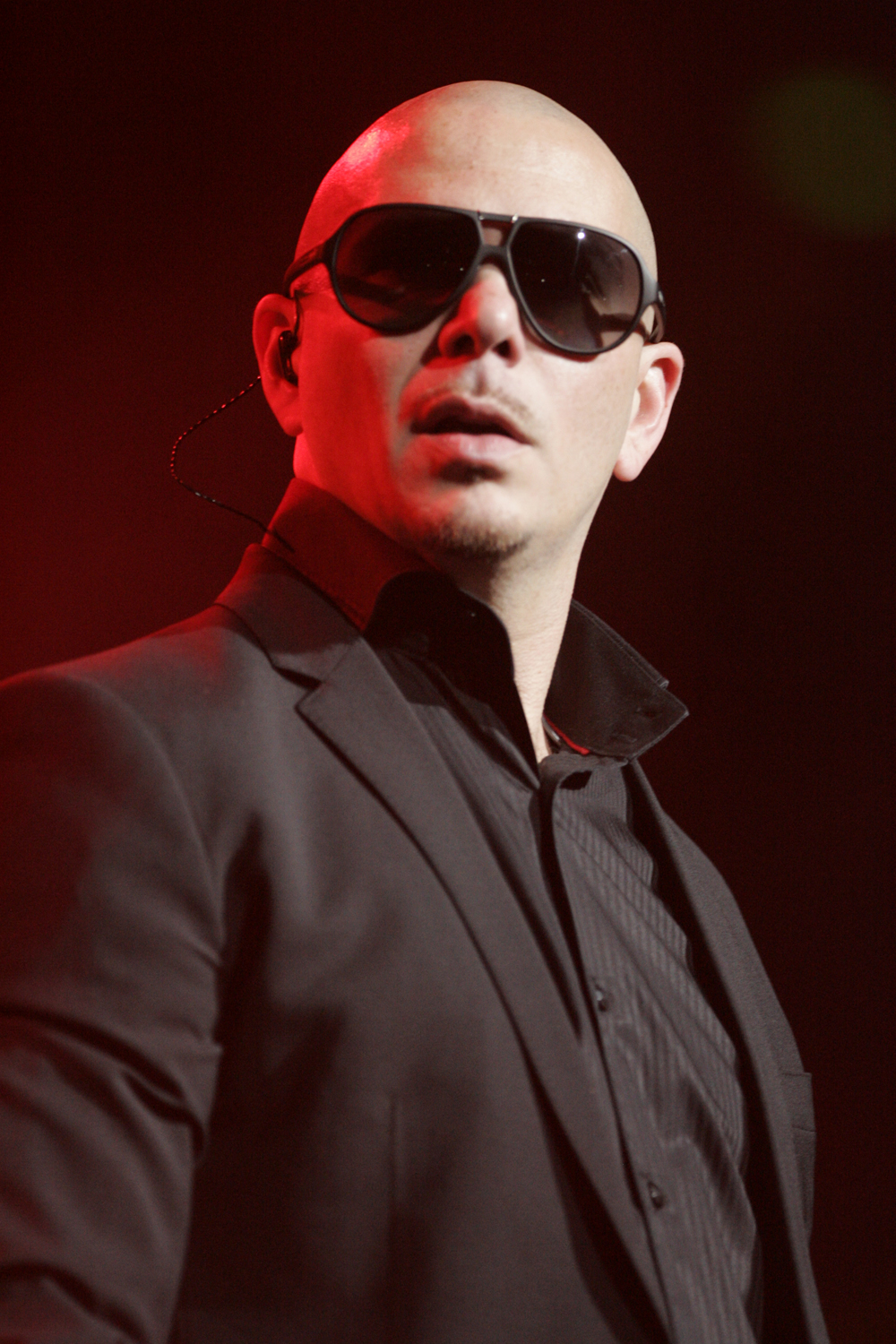
Pitbull is featured on the RedOne remix of "We Run the Night."

In 2008, Havana Brown signed a recording deal with Universal Music Australia, and began releasing her Crave compilation series through the label. Throughout 2008 and 2009, Brown toured as a supporting act with Rihanna, The Pussycat Dolls, Lady Gaga and Britney Spears during the Australian legs of their tours. By the end of 2009, Brown commenced working on Australian radio, providing mixes for the Party People programme every Saturday night on the Today Network. In 2010, Brown continued to tour and began the process of recording material for her debut album. Discussing the process of creating "We Run the Night", Brown said that she wanted a pop record with a Dutch breakdown after each chorus. Brown spoke of trying to find a producer to make the record, and eventually working with production duo More Mega, saying: "I wanted a certain kind of sound and I could hear it in my head. Some people were telling me it was too "pop" or that it was too "club". Fortunately, I was able to work with a duo here who totally got both worlds."

""I wanted to combine the club and commercial worlds in one song [...] I wanted to make something that I could play in my DJ sets and on my radio show… RedOne was perfect. We were trying to mix two types of music together."

— Havana Brown, ahead of the release of "We Run the Night" in the United Kingdom, speaking of the RedOne remix's composition.

After the initial success of the More Mega production, Moroccan-Swedish producer RedOne reached out to Brown via Twitter asking if he could contact her. Having heard "We Run the Night" through Enrique Iglesias, with whom Brown had performed "Heartbeat" (replacing Nicole Scherzinger, the original featured artist) on The X Factor, RedOne expressed his interest in making his own version of the track. RedOne played his remix of "We Run the Night" to American rapper Pitbull, who liked the song and recorded a rapped verse for it. In an interview with the Huffington Post, Brown commented on her collaboration with Pitbull, "He is one of my favorite people. He's generous and loyal. He is a great person to be around and always a lot of fun. I love how hard he works! He really loves what he does. I was playing his music for about 8 yrs before it was commercially successful. So I'm a long time fan. He's just an all around awesome guy."

"We Run the Night" was written and produced by Cassie Davis and Snob Scrilla of production duo More Mega. The recording is an up-tempo dance-pop and Eurodance song that is set in common time. It is written in the key of C major and moves at a moderate 127 beats per minute.

== Reception ==
=== Critical response ===
Nic Maher of Luna magazine called the song "quite catchy" and wrote, "autotune saves this femme fatale from what would otherwise be a disastrous release." Layla Clarke of The AU Review wrote, "We Run the Night is as epic as it is euphoric, with an insanely infectious breakdown that's guaranteed to throw the crowd into overdrive." After listening to the song, a writer for Beat magazine felt Brown should stick to being a DJ because "a singer she is not!". Amanda Hooton from The Sydney Morning Herald praised Brown and the song, commenting, "Brown can hold a tune, she looks amazing in music clips and, most of all, she knows what gets a crowd moving. "We Run The Night" was one of those songs you hear for the first time and think you know: the lean-in beat, the hands-up chorus, the "Dutch break" locking down like a sports car changing gears."

In an interview with Brown, Reyne Haines, media personality for the Huffington Post, commented "I loved the song "We Run the Night" the very first time I heard it on the radio. It's now reached over 31 million views on YouTube and landed in the #1 spot on the Billboard charts. It had to be such a rush to work with a mega star [Pitbull]".

=== Chart performance ===
"We Run the Night" debuted at number seven on the ARIA Singles Chart on 19 January 2012 serving as the highest debuting single of that week. It also became the first single from an Australian artist to debut within the top-ten in 2011. The following week, the song fell down three spots to number ten. In its fifth week on the chart, "We Run the Night" moved from number seven to number five, where it peaked. It was certified sextuple platinum by the Australian Recording Industry Association (ARIA), for selling 420,000 equivalent unit. In New Zealand, "We Run the Night" debuted at number thirty on the NZ Top 40, on 12 March 2014. One week later, the recording made a big leap reaching its peak at number five, where it stayed for three non-consecutive weeks. It was certified platinum by Recorded Music NZ (RMNZ) for sales of 15,000 copies of the single.

The RedOne remix peaked at number one on the US Billboard Hot Dance Songs chart. Brown became the first Australian recording artist to reach that spot since Kylie Minogue topped the chart with her song "Put Your Hands Up (If You Feel Love)". On the week of 7 April 2012, "We Run the Night" made its debut on the Billboard Hot 100 at number 99 and peaked at number 26. On the Mainstream Top 40 charts, "We Run the Night" completed the longest climb to the chart's upper half in fourteen years and the third-longest overall, after Edwin McCain's song "I'll Be" which took 22 weeks in 1998, and the Melissa Etheridge track "Come to My Window" taking 20 weeks in 1994. It also peaked at number 48 in Canada. As of September 2012, the song has sold 1,000,000 digital copies in the US.

Robert Copsey from Digital Spy marveled at the single's worldwide commercial success, "The track - which has had over 18 million hits on YouTube - has already entered the charts all over the world, peaking at number five in Australia and number 26 on the Billboard Hot 100."

== Music video ==
Two different videos were made for the song. One was for the original Australian release and used the More Mega version. The other was for the international release and used the RedOne remix featuring Pitbull.

=== Synopsis ===
The music video for the RedOne remix is set at a dance club party and revolves around shots of Havana Brown singing, dancing, and posing. In some shots, she sits on a red throne while half-naked bodies dance around her, as if to worship her. Some frames show close-ups of Brown in a tight gold dress as she flirts with featured artist Pitbull, during which she sings the opening verse: "When the sun goes down, down, down, down / Boy are you afraid of the dark, dark? / And when the lights go out, out, out, out / Tell me, do you know where to start, start? / And when the bass gets loud, loud, loud / That is when I feel a part / And when the world sleeps sound, sound, sound / The sound is the key to my heart". Pitbull is well-dressed in a suit with a red coat and he flirts with Havana Brown. Brown then enters the DJ booth and begins to play music for a dance party, and at the end of the video she uses a hammer to smash the booth as if to truly "run the night."

=== Reception ===
Scott Shetler from WQSH in Albany, New York, commented that in the video, "the pair [Havana Brown and Pitbull] back up their claim [to run the night] by owning the dance club in the song’s music video." He also noted, "When the always well-dressed Pitbull enters the picture for his verse, Mr. 305 gets up close and personal with Brown and teases, "Let me tickle it, baby". Brown enters the DJ booth to crank up the party even more, reminding viewers that she's more than just a pretty face." Shetler concludes, "All the smiling faces and hands in the air make us wish we were at this party!"

== Live performances ==
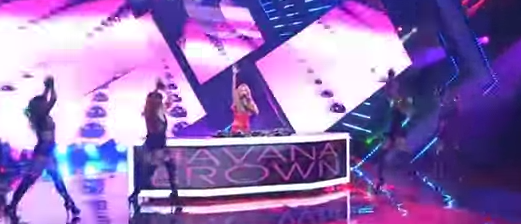
Havana Brown performing "We Run the Night" live at the ABU TV Song Festival 2012.

On 18 July 2012, Brown appeared as a musical guest on America's Got Talent and performed "We Run the Night". She also performed the track, with "Big Banana", on American television show Oh Sit! in April 2013. In Australia, the track was performed on the third series of the Australian version of The X Factor as a medley with "Get It" on 1 November 2011.

In August 2012, Brown became a supporting act, alongside Timomatic and Taio Cruz, for Pitbull's Australian leg of his Planet Pit World Tour where she also performed the song. Brown represented Australia at the first ABU TV Song Festival 2012, which took place at the KBS Concert Hall in Seoul, South Korea on 14 October 2012 and performed "We Run the Night" to millions of viewers.

== Track listing ==
- Digital download – Main Single
1. "We Run the Night" – 3:36
- Digital download – RedOne Remix
1. "We Run the Night" (Explicit Version) (featuring Pitbull) – 3:48
2. "We Run the Night" (Edited Version) (featuring Pitbull) – 3:48
- Digital download – Redial Remix
1. "We Run the Night" – 4:48
- Digital download – Dr Chong Remix
1. "We Run the Night" – 4:47
- Digital download – Angger Dimas Remix
1. "We Run the Night" – 5:50
- Digital download – Static Revenger Remix
1. "We Run the Night" – 7:44
- Australian CD EP – Limited Edition
1. "We Run the Night" – 3:36
2. "We Run the Night" (Angger Dimas Remix) – 5:50
3. "We Run the Night" (Redial Remix) – 4:48
4. "We Run the Night" (Dr Chong Remix) – 4:47
5. "We Run the Night" (Matt GC Remix) – 3:57
6. "We Run the Night" (J-Trick Remix) – 3:19
- US CD EP – Limited Edition
1. "We Run The Night" (featuring Pitbull) – 3:48
2. "We Run The Night" (More Mega Version) – 3:36
3. "We Run The Night" (Congorock Remix) – 5:38
4. "We Run The Night" (DJ Vice Remix) – 5:57
5. "We Run The Night" (Proper Villains Remix) – 4:07

== Charts ==
=== Weekly charts ===
==== Original release (2011) ====
Chart (2011–2012)	Peak position
Australia (ARIA)	5
Australia Dance (ARIA)	1
Belgium (Ultratop 50 Wallonia)	45
France (SNEP)	37
New Zealand (Recorded Music NZ)	5
Romania (Romanian Top 100)	50

Chart (2011 - 2012)	Peak position
Canada (Canadian Hot 100)	48
Czech Republic Airplay (ČNS IFPI)	53
Mexican Airplay Chart (Billboard International)	44
Norway (VG-lista)	17
Russia Airplay (TopHit)	28
Slovakia (IFPI)	16
US Billboard Hot 100	26
US Dance Club Songs (Billboard)	1
US Dance Airplay (Billboard)	11
US Pop Airplay (Billboard)	15

Chart (2022)	Peak position
Australia (ARIA)	38

=== Year-end charts ===
Chart (2011)	Position
Australia (ARIA)	40
Chart (2012)	Position
France (SNEP)	171
US Billboard Hot 100	90
US Dance Club Songs (Billboard)	40
US Dance/Mix Show Airplay (Billboard)	28

2013 year-end chart performance for "We Run the Night"
Chart (2013)	Position
Russia Airplay (TopHit)	130

== Certifications ==
Region	Certification	Certified units/sales
Australia (ARIA)	6× Platinum	420,000^{‡}
New Zealand (RMNZ)	Platinum	15,000^{*}
United States (RIAA)	Platinum	1,000,000^{*}
^{*} Sales figures based on certification alone.^{‡} Sales+streaming figures based on certification alone.

== Release history ==
Region	Date	Format	Version	Label
Australia	29 April 2011	Digital download	Main Single	Island
Austria	29 April 2011	Digital download	Main Single	Island
Belgium	29 April 2011	Digital download	Main Single	Island
Denmark	29 April 2011	Digital download	Main Single	Island
Finland	29 April 2011	Digital download	Main Single	Island
France	29 April 2011	Digital download	Main Single	Island
Italy	29 April 2011	Digital download	Main Single	Island
Netherlands	29 April 2011	Digital download	Main Single	Island
New Zealand	29 April 2011	Digital download	Main Single	Island
Norway	29 April 2011	Digital download	Main Single	Island
Sweden	29 April 2011	Digital download	Main Single	Island
Switzerland	29 April 2011	Digital download	Main Single	Island
Australia	13 May 2011	Digital download	Dr Chong Remix	Island
Australia	24 May 2011	Digital download	Redial Remix	Island
Australia	6 June 2011	Digital download	Angger Dimas Remix	Island
United States	27 September 2011	Digital download	RedOne Remix	Universal; 2101
Austria	19 December 2011	Digital download	RedOne Remix	Universal; 2101
Belgium	19 December 2011	Digital download	RedOne Remix	Universal; 2101
Denmark	19 December 2011	Digital download	RedOne Remix	Universal; 2101
France	19 December 2011	Digital download	RedOne Remix	Universal; 2101
Germany	19 December 2011	Digital download	RedOne Remix	Universal; 2101
Netherlands	19 December 2011	Digital download	RedOne Remix	Universal; 2101
Sweden	19 December 2011	Digital download	RedOne Remix	Universal; 2101
Switzerland	19 December 2011	Digital download	RedOne Remix	Universal; 2101
United States	31 January 2012	Mainstream airplay	RedOne Remix	Universal; 2101
Canada	26 March 2012	Digital download	RedOne Remix (Edited version)	Universal; 2101
United States	26 March 2012	Digital download	RedOne Remix (Edited version)	Universal; 2101
United Kingdom	1 June 2012	Digital download	Static Revenger Remix	Universal; 2101
United Kingdom	14 October 2012	Digital download	Remix EP	Universal; 2101

== In other media ==
“We Run The Night” appeared in the opening montage of Canadian sports channel RDS’ broadcast of the National Hockey League game between the Montreal Canadiens and the Florida Panthers on March 27, 2012.

== See also ==
- List of number-one dance singles of 2011 (Australia)
- List of number-one dance singles of 2012 (U.S.)
