= Havana Brown (musician) =

Australian DJ, singer, and songwriter

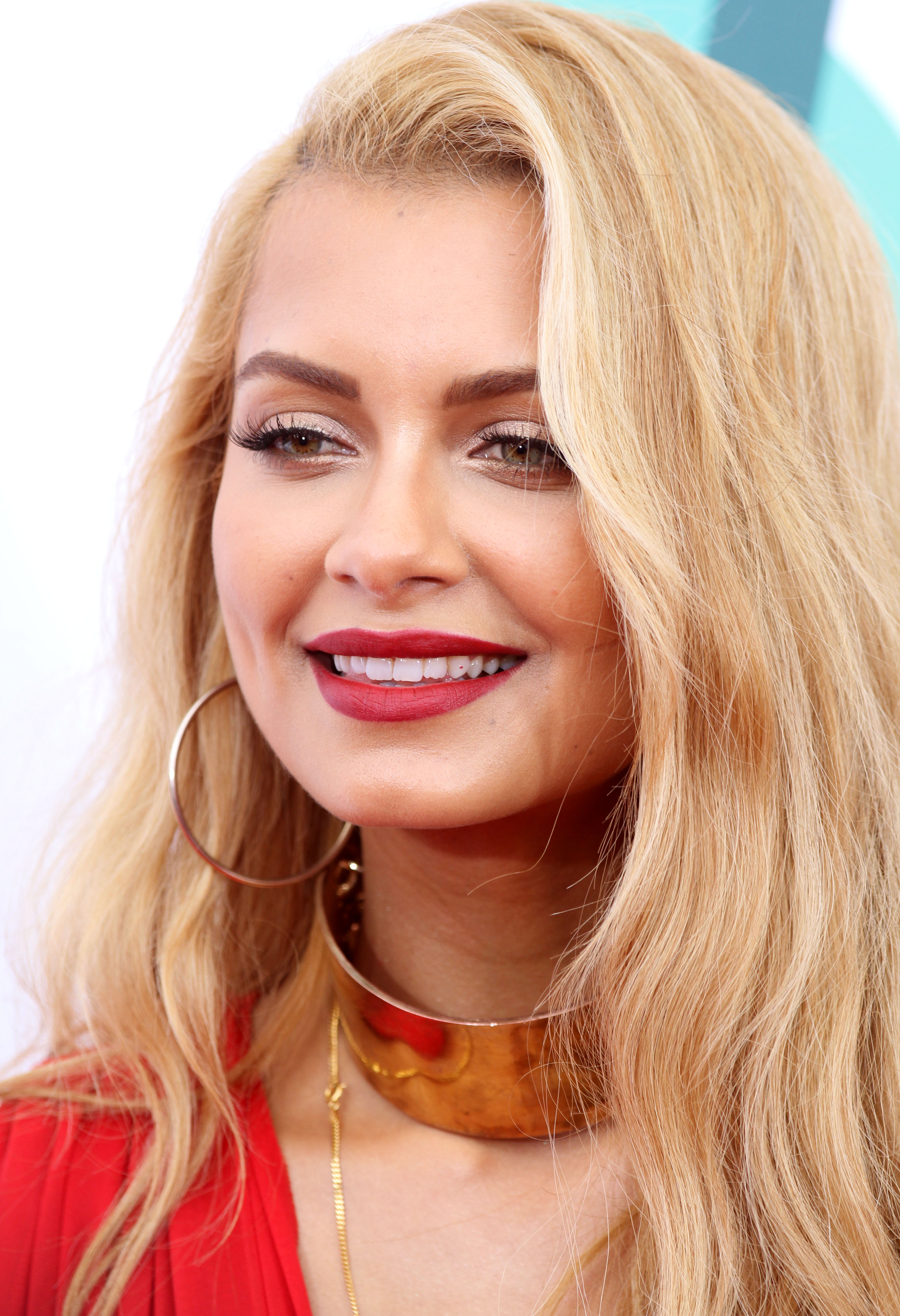
- Brown at the 2014 ARIA Music Awards

Background information
- Born: Angelique Frances Meunier; 14 February 1985 (age 41); Melbourne, Victoria, Australia
- Genres: Dance-pop; Electro house
- Occupations: DJ; singer; songwriter; record producer; dancer; actress
- Years active: 2008–present
- Labels: Island; Republic; 2101 (US)
- Website: djhavanabrown.com.au

Angelique Frances Meunier (born 14 February 1985), known professionally as Havana Brown or DJ Havana Brown, is an Australian DJ, singer, songwriter, record producer and dancer. In 2008, Brown signed with Island Records Australia as a DJ for the record company and began releasing her Crave compilation album series, which featured remixes of songs from other artists. This led to her touring with international artists, including Britney Spears, Rihanna, the Pussycat Dolls, Chris Brown and Enrique Iglesias.

Brown made her debut as a recording artist in 2011, with the single "We Run the Night", which reached No.5 on the Australian ARIA Singles Chart and was certified triple platinum by the Australian Recording Industry Association (ARIA). The single earned Brown two ARIA Music Award nominations for Breakthrough Artist Single and Highest Selling Single. Following this success, Brown signed a US record deal with Universal Republic via producer RedOne's label 2101 Records. A remix of "We Run the Night", featuring American rapper Pitbull was produced by RedOne and released in the United States. It reached No.1 on the US Hot Dance Club Songs chart and No.26 on the US Billboard Hot 100 chart. The remix was included on Brown's first EP, When the Lights Go Out, which was released in July 2012.

Brown was one of the contestants in the second season of the Australian version of the TV series, I'm a Celebrity...Get Me Out of Here! in 2016, where she came 6th. In 2024 she teamed up with her friend Stephanie Wood to compete on The Amazing Race Australia (celebrity edition), where she placed 7th.

Brown has been engaged since 2015 to former Young Talent Time star Vince Del Tito.

== Life and career ==
=== Early life and career beginnings ===
Brown was born in Melbourne, Australia to Mauritian parents of French descent from the island of Rodrigues and grew up in both Australia and Rodrigues, which she used to visit frequently. Before she started to DJ, she was signed to a record label in the United Kingdom with a group called Fishbowl. They were about to release their first single under the label, but the group broke up and Brown turned to DJing. She then began performing at venues around Melbourne and worked with promotions around Australia.

=== 2008–09: Crave and touring ===
In 2008, Brown signed to Island Records Australia after being approached by a boss of the label who asked her if she was interested in doing a compilation album. She released her Crave compilation series through the label. In October 2008, Brown supported Rihanna on the Australian leg of her Good Girl Gone Bad Tour. In May 2009, she served as a support act for the Pussycat Dolls during the Australian leg of their Doll Domination Tour. Brown also supported Britney Spears during the European leg of her 2009 Circus Tour. She earned the same support role for the Australian leg of the tour in November 2009.

Since December 2009, Brown has provided mixes every Saturday night on Party People, a radio show that broadcasts across Australia by the Today Network.

=== 2011–2013: Breakthrough and When The Lights Go Out ===
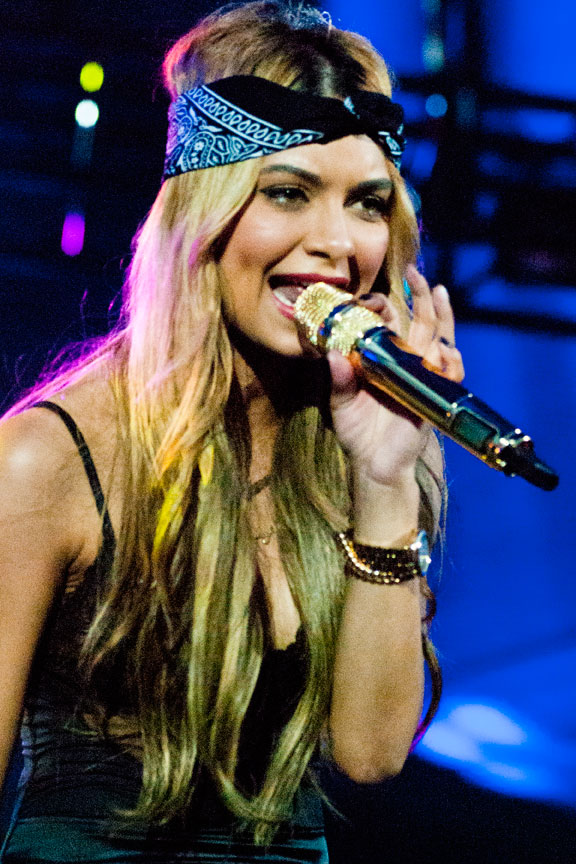
Brown performing at the B96 Summerbash in Chicago on 16 June 2012.

In April 2011, Brown was a supporting act for Chris Brown's Australian leg of his F.A.M.E. Tour. On 29 April 2011, Brown released her debut single "We Run the Night", which was written and produced by Cassie Davis and Snob Scrilla of the production duo More Mega. The song peaked at No.5 on the ARIA Singles Chart and was certified triple platinum by the Australian Recording Industry Association (ARIA), for selling 210,000 copies. On 4 September 2011, Brown told The Daily Telegraph that she had signed a US recording contract with Universal Republic Records via producer RedOne's label 2101 Records. The official remix of "We Run the Night", featuring additional production by RedOne and a rap verse by American rapper Pitbull, was released in the United States on 27 September 2011. It peaked at No.1 on the US Hot Dance Club Songs chart. Brown's second single "Get It" was released on 9 September 2011, and peaked at No.38 on the ARIA Singles Chart. On 20 April 2012, Brown released a promotional single titled "City of Darkness".

Brown's debut EP When the Lights Go Out was released on 17 July 2012. The Australian version of the EP included five new songs, while the US version included the RedOne remix of "We Run the Night". On 18 July 2012, she appeared as a musical guest on America's Got Talent. In August 2012, Brown became a supporting act, alongside Timomatic and Taio Cruz, for Pitbull's Australian leg of his Planet Pit World Tour. Brown represented Australia at the first ABU TV Song Festival 2012, which took place at the KBS Concert Hall in Seoul, South Korea, on 14 October 2012. "Big Banana", featuring R3hab and Prophet of 7Lions, was released as the third single from When the Lights Go Out on 4 December 2012. It was Brown's second single to peak at No.1 on the US Hot Dance Club Songs chart. It also peaked at No.15 on the US Dance/Electronic Songs chart. In Australia, "Big Banana" peaked at No.18 on the ARIA Singles Chart, and at No.2 on the ARIA Dance Singles Chart. The song was certified gold by the Australian Recording Industry Association (ARIA), denoting sales of 70,000 copies. "Spread a Little Love" was released as the fourth single from the EP but failed to chart.

=== 2013–2022: Flashing Lights and subsequent releases ===
Brown's debut studio album Flashing Lights was released on 11 October 2013, which debuted at No.6 on the ARIA Albums Chart. It features collaborations with RedOne, R3hab, Cassie Davis, Snob Scrilla and Afrojack. Flashing Lights also features previously released tracks "We Run the Night", "Big Banana" and "You'll Be Mine". The album was in the process of creation from 2011 when "We Run the Night" was released (which sold over one million copies in the United States and charted across the globe). Brown spent 2012 and 2013 primarily based in the US working on the album. The lead single "Flashing Lights" was released on 23 August 2013 and peaked at No.68 on the ARIA Singles Chart. "Flashing Lights" peaked at No.1 on the Hot Dance Club Songs chart marking it her third No.1 in the US on that chart. The second single "Warrior" was released on 27 September 2013, and debuted at No.32 before peaking at No.11 and was certified platinum for sales of over 70,000 copies. On 14 October 2013, Brown performed "Warrior" on season five of The X Factor Australia.

On 27 March 2014, Brown released the single "Whatever We Want", which peaked at No.35 on the ARIA Singles Chart. Brown's next single "Better Not Said" was released on 9 September 2014, and peaked at No.79. In January 2015, she released her eleventh lead single "No Ordinary Love", which is a dance version of Sade's song of the same name.

On 24 July 2015, Brown released her new single entitled "Battle Cry", featuring guest vocals from Bebe Rexha and Savi.

In 2018, Brown released the Hip hop influenced single "Glimpse" (feat. Rich the Kid). The single was originally the lead single from her then upcoming EP, with "Cookie" (feat. Veronica Vega) released on 10 May 2019 as the second single from the proposed EP. However the EP was subsequently scrapped due to damage to the original masters.

On 18 October 2019, Brown released the single "All Day", which has Pop music and R&B influenced sound.

=== 2023 ===
In October 2023, Brown released "Forever Young". Her first new single in four years and first under new label Havana Brown Entertainment (HBE).

In 2024, Brown along with her best friend Steph competed on Network 10's The Amazing Race Australia 8, where they have been eliminated fifth.

== Influences ==
Brown claimed Janet Jackson as her biggest influence, stating "She's my idol" and "I want to be Janet Jackson! But the DJ-slash-Janet Jackson—I want to be able to put on big shows, I want dancers, I want fireworks, I want it all."

== Discography ==
Studio albums

- Flashing Lights (2013)

EPs

- When the Lights Go Out (2012)

== Tours ==
Headlining

- Oz Tour (2013–14)

Supporting act

- Rihanna's Good Girl Gone Bad Tour: Australian leg (2008)
- The Pussycat Dolls Doll Domination Tour: Australian leg (2009)
- Britney Spears's Circus Tour: Europe and Australia legs (select dates) (2009)
- Chris Brown's F.A.M.E. Tour: Australian leg (2011)
- Enrique Iglesias's Euphoria Tour: Australian leg (2011)
- Pitbull's Planet Pit World Tour: Australian leg (2012)
- Bruno Mars's The Moonshine Jungle Tour: Las Vegas (2014)

== Filmography ==
=== Film ===
Year	Title	Role	Ref
2019	Tell Me I Love You	DJ Phillipa	
2022	Wog Boys Forever	Sapphire	

=== Television ===
Year	Title	Role	Notes	Ref.
2000	Neighbours	Cheyenne Rivers	11 episodes, credited as Angelique Meunier	

== Awards and nominations ==
=== ARIA Music Awards ===
The ARIA Music Awards is an annual ceremony presented by Australian Recording Industry Association (ARIA), which recognises excellence, innovation and achievement across all genres of the music of Australia. The awards commenced in 1987.

Year	Nominee / work	Award	Result	Ref.
2011	"We Run the Night"	Highest Selling Single	Nominated	
2011	"We Run the Night"	Breakthrough Artist – Single	Nominated	
2012	When the Lights Go Out	Best Dance Release	Nominated	
2014	"Warrior"	Song of the Year	Nominated	

=== APRA Awards ===
The APRA Awards are held in Australia and New Zealand by the Australasian Performing Right Association to recognise songwriting skills, sales and airplay performance by its members annually.

Year	Nominee / work	Award	Result	Ref.
2012	"We Run the Night" (Cassie Davis, Sean Mullins)	Dance Work of the Year	Nominated	

=== Channel V Awards ===
The Channel V Oz Artist of the Year was an annual award presented by Channel V Australia and is voted by the Australian public from 1997 to 2014.

Year	Nominee / work	Award	Result	Ref.
2013	herself	Channel V Oz Artist of the Year	Nominated	

=== MTV Europe Music Awards ===
The MTV Europe Music Awards are awards presented by Paramount International Networks to honour artists and music in pop culture.

Year	Nominee / work	Award	Result	Ref.
2014	herself	Best Australia Act	Nominated	

=== Poprepublic.tv IT List Awards ===
Year	Nominee / work	Award	Result	Ref.
2011	herself	Australian Female Artist	Nominated	
2011	herself	Favourite DJ of 2011	Won	
2011	herself	Breakthrough Artist of 2011	Won	
2012	herself	Favourite Australian Female Artist	Nominated	
2012	herself	Favourite DJ of 2012	Won	

=== World Music Awards ===
The World Music Awards is an international award show and presents awards to the world's best-selling artists in a number of categories from each major territory. They were last held in 2014.

Year	Nominee / work	Award	Result	Ref.
2014	herself	World's Best Female Artist	Nominated	
2014	herself	World's Best Live Act	Nominated	
2014	herself	World's Best Entertainer of the Year	Nominated	
2014	"Warrior"	World's Best Song	Nominated	

Awards and achievements
Preceded by None	Australia in the ABU TV Song Festival; 2012 with "We Run the Night"	Succeeded by Justice Crew with "Boom Boom & Everybody" _{Mashup}
