= Island Records Australia =

Australian record label; imprint of Universal Music Australia

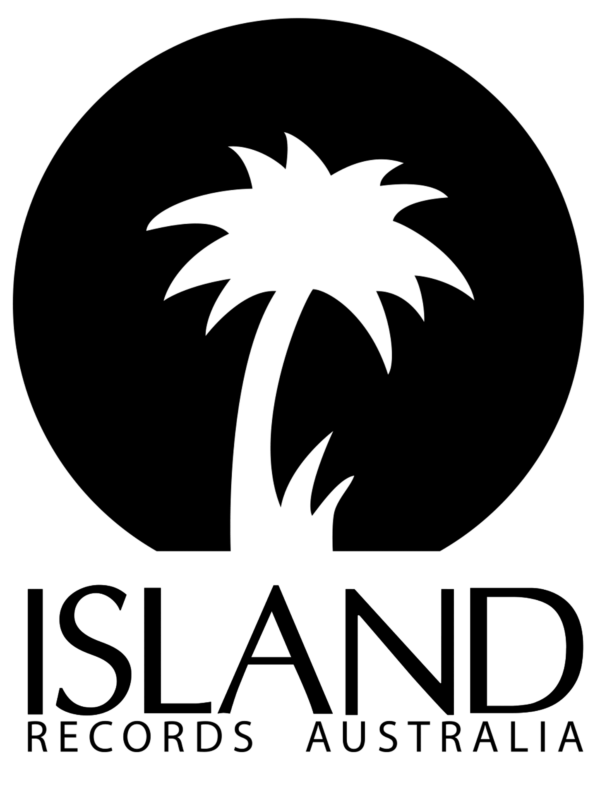
- Parent company: Universal Music Australia, Universal Music Group
- Founded: 2007
- Founder: Michael Taylor
- Distributor: Universal Music Australia
- Genre: Various
- Country of origin: Australia
- Location: Sydney, Australia
- Official website: islandrecordsaustralia.com

Island Records Australia is an Australian record label that was launched in 2007 by Michael Taylor. It is part of the Universal Music Group and is the Universal Music Australia variant of Island Records. Taylor described "Island Australia (as) a home for artists who cut their own path, who start from the left, and who, in time, come into the mainstream on their own artistic terms". Island Records Australia is now headed by Nicole Richards.

Island Records Australia is the label home for established artists Hilltop Hoods, Peach PRC, Baker Boy, Vera Blue, Matt Corby, Broods, Briggs, and more.

In 2020, Island Records Australia had the #1 streaming Australian artist with Hilltop Hoods, won 5x ARIAs including Album of the Year with Tame Impala, and hit 5 billion streams with Dean Lewis' debut album, A Place We Knew. In March 2020, during the COVID-19 lockdown, Island Records Australia launched their Live From The Island livestreaming series where a number of artists on the roster performed their music live online for fans, and hosted trivia nights and live painting sessions.

== Songwriting Invitationals ==
Island Records Australia is a co-sponsor of The Invitational Group's 'Bali Songwriting Invitational', and 'Tuscany Songwriting Invitational' – 10-day song-writing events for artists, songwriters and producers held in private villas in Ubud, Bali and Camporgiano, Italy. Attendees at past events include; Nick Jonas, Kesha, Demi Lovato, Noah Cyrus, Oak Felder, Steve Lillywhite, Cathy Dennis, Taylor Parx, and Brian Lee. Other co-sponsors include APRA AMCOS and Milk & Honey Music Management.

== Current artists ==
- A.B. Original
- Adrian Eagle
- Alice Skye (via Bad Apples Music)
- Baker Boy
- Barkaa (via Bad Apples Music)
- Bella Mackenzie
- Ben Swissa
- BIG NOTER
- Briggs
- Broods
- Brooke McClymont & Adam Eckersley
- Charlie Collins
- Charlie Pittman
- Clare Bowditch
- Heleina Zara
- Hellcat Speedracer
- Hilltop Hoods
- Jack Gray
- Jarryd James
- Kobie Dee (via Bad Apples Music)
- Lachie Gill
- Luca George
- Matt Corby
- Peach PRC
- Rachael Fahim
- REDD.
- Seth Sentry
- Shane Nicholson (via Lost Highway Records)
- The Mcclymonts
- Tori Forsyth
- trials
- Ukiyo
- Vera Blue
- Yorke
- ZPLUTO

== See also ==
- List of record labels
