= Kat DeLuna discography =

- Studio albums: 3
- Singles: 26
- Music videos: 27
- Featured singles: 5

This is the discography of pop/R&B singer Kat DeLuna. DeLuna first rose to fame in 2007, when she released her debut single "Whine Up". The single became one of the most played songs on pop radio that summer, and achieved major success worldwide, reaching the top ten in countries such as Belgium and France. The single also became a smash hit in the US, peaking inside the top forty of the Hot 100 single chart, as well as topped the Hot Dance Club Play chart. The single led to the release of DeLuna's debut album, 9 Lives in the Fall of 2007. The album was met to generally positive critical reception. The album debuted at number 58 in the US, and charted within the top twenty of countries such as Belgium and Poland.

In 2008, DeLuna began work on her second studio album. The album spawned several official and promotional singles. The first of these was "Unstoppable", which became a minor hit in Canada. The song was featured in the film Confessions of a Shopaholic, as well as its accompanying soundtrack. It was followed by the second promotional single "Dance Bailalo", which became a major hit on the US Hot Dance Club Play chart. DeLuna's second album, titled Inside Out later spawned the official singles "Push Push", "Party O'Clock" and "Dancing Tonight". After much delay, Inside Out was released in Belgium on November 5, 2010. It received commercial success, reaching the top twenty of the Belgium album chart. The album is currently released only in some European markets (Belgium, France, Poland). Inside Out was also released in Japan on July 13, 2011. A third studio album, Loading appeared in 2016, a deluxe edition as EP Loading (Japanese Edition) has arrived in the same year.

== Albums ==
=== Studio albums ===
List of albums, with selected chart positions
Title	Album details	Peak chart positions						Certifications
Title	Album details	US	AUT	BEL	FIN	FRA	SWI	Certifications
9 Lives	Released: August 7, 2007; Label: Epic; Formats: CD, digital download	58	31	16	15	26	24	
Inside Out	Released: November 5, 2010; Label: Universal Motown; Formats: CD, digital download	—	—	16	—	114	—	
Loading	Released: August 5, 2016; Label: Entertainment One Music; Formats: CD, digital download	—	—	—	—	—	—	
"—" denotes a title that did not chart, or was not released in that territory.

=== Mixtapes ===
List of albums, with selected details
Title	Album details
Inside Out: The Mixtape	Released: September 10, 2010; Label: Universal Motown; Format: Digital download

== Extended plays ==
Title	Details
Loading (Japanese Version)	Released: October 7, 2016; Label: Cape Republic; Format: Digital download

== Singles ==
=== As lead artist ===
List of singles, with selected chart positions
Title	Year	Peak chart positions										Album
Title	Year	US	US Dance	US Tropic	BEL	CAN	FIN	FRA	GER	SWI	UK	Album
"Whine Up" (featuring Elephant Man)	2007	29	1	14	6	15	—	9	24	49	—	9 Lives
"Am I Dreaming"^{[A]}	2007	—	—	24	—	—	—	—	—	—	—	9 Lives
"Run the Show"^{[A]} (featuring Busta Rhymes or Don Omar)	2008	—^{[B]}	2	38	5	—	2	6	73	29	41	9 Lives
"In the End"	2008	—	—	—	31	—	—	—	—	—	—	9 Lives
"Unstoppable" (featuring Lil Wayne)	2009	—	—	—	—	80	—	—	—	—	—	Inside Out
"Push Push" (featuring Akon)	2010	—	—	—	15	84	—	9	—	—	—	Inside Out
"Party O'Clock"	2010	—	—	—	17	—	—	76	—	—	—	Inside Out
"Dancing Tonight" (featuring Fo Onassis)	2011	—	1	—	15	—	—	—	—	—	—	Inside Out
"Drop It Low"	2011	—	27	—	12	—	—	—	—	—	—	Inside Out
"Boom Boom (Tequila)"	2011	—	—	—	—	—	—	—	—	—	—	Inside Out
"Wanna See U Dance (La La La)"	2012	—	—	—	—	—	—	188	—	—	—	Loading
"Sobredosis" (featuring El Cata)	2012	—	32	—	—	—	—	—	—	—	—	Loading
"Wild Girl" (featuring DJ Yass Carter)	2013	—	—	—	—	—	—	—	—	—	—	Loading
"Stars"	2013	—	2	2	—	—	—	—	—	—	—	Loading
"Bum Bum" (featuring Trey Songz)	2015	— (Note: "Bum Bum" did not enter the Billboard Hot 100, but peaked at No. 32 on the Rhythmic Songs chart.)	—	—	71	—	—	—	—	—	—	Loading
"What a Night" (featuring Jeremih)	2016	— (Note: "What a Night" did not enter the Billboard Hot 100, but peaked at No. 30 on the Rhythmic Songs chart.)	—	—	—	—	—	—	—	—	—	Loading
"Forever" (featuring Natel)	2016	—	—	—	—	—	—	—	—	—	—	Loading
"Waves"	2016	—	—	—	—	—	—	—	—	—	—	Loading
"Nueva Actitud" (featuring Arcangel)	2018	—	—	—	—	—	—	—	—	—	—	Non-album singles
"Last Night in Miami"	2019	—	—	—	—	—	—	—	—	—	—	Non-album singles
"Only One"	2019	—	—	—	—	—	—	—	—	—	—	Non-album singles
"Hottie with a Body"	2023	—	—	—	—	—	—	—	—	—	—	Non-album singles
"O Holy Night"	2023	—	—	—	—	—	—	—	—	—	—	Non-album singles
"Kruela"	2024	—	—	—	—	—	—	—	—	—	—	Non-album singles
"Mala Mía"	2026	—	—	—	—	—	—	—	—	—	—	Non-album singles
"Move Your Cadera"	2026	—	—	—	—	—	—	—	—	—	—	Non-album singles
"—" denotes a title that did not chart, or was not released in that territory.

=== As featured artist ===
List of singles, with selected chart positions
Title	Year	Peak chart positions					Album
Title	Year	US	BEL	FIN	FRA	SWE	Album
"Cut Off Time" (Omarion featuring Kat DeLuna)	2007	—^{[C]}	—	—	—	—	Feel the Noise
"Breathing Your Love" (Darin featuring Kat DeLuna)	2008	—	—	13	—	2	Flashback
"Somos El Mundo 25 Por Haiti" (Artists for Haiti)	2010	—	—	—	—	—	non-album single
"I'm Alright" (Jean-Roch featuring Flo Rida & Kat DeLuna)	2011	—	—	—	33	—	Music Saved My Life
"Tonite" (Nicola Fasano featuring Kat DeLuna)	2011	—	—	—	—	—	non-album single
"Dame" (Shaggy featuring Kat DeLuna)	2012	—	—	—	—	—	Summer in Kingston
"She Said Her Name Was VODKA" (Fo Onassis featuring Kat DeLuna, Fatman Scoop, & David S.)	2012	—	—	—	—	—	non-album single
"I Had a Dream" (David Latour featuring Kat DeLuna & Fo Onassis)	2012	—	47	—	—	—	non-album single
"Shake It" (Dam'Edge featuring Kat DeLuna & Fatman Scoop)	2012	—	61	—	—	—	non-album single
"Always on My Mind" (Kat DeLuna featuring Costi)	2013	—	—	—	—	—	non-album single
"Last Call" (The Bello Boys featuring Kat DeLuna)	2014	—	—	—	—	—	non-album single
"Nobody" (Faydee featuring Kat DeLuna & Leftside)	2016	—	—	—	—	—	non-album single

=== Promotional singles ===
List of singles, with selected chart positions
Title	Year	Peak chart positions		Album
Title	Year	US Tropic	US Dance	Album
"Dale Duro" (featuring Jae Millz)	2006	—	—	Non-album single
"Dance Bailalo"	2009	34	—	Inside Out: The Mixtape
"Close My Eyes"	2016	—	–	Loading
"Dímelo"	2025	—	–	Non-album single

== Other appearances ==
Year	Title	Album
2007	"Body Talk" (Elephant Man featuring Kat DeLuna & Jha Jha)	Let's Get Physical
2008	"You're My Baby" (Hollowpoint featuring Kat DeLuna)	Reggae Dancehall Nature (Jah Snowcone)
2008	"Right Now (Na Na Na) (Remix)" (Akon featuring Kat DeLuna)	non-album single
2008	"Curiosity" (Andy Hilfiger featuring Kat DeLuna, Zieme & Nani)	Made in Harlem
2009	"Calling You"	Confessions of a Shopaholic
2009	"Shake It Up" (Big Ali featuring Kat DeLuna)	Louder
2009	"Whine Up (Johnny Vicious Spanish Mix)" (Kat DeLuna featuring Elephant Man)	Bring It On: Fight To The Finish
2017	"Right Now" (Yemi Alade featuring Kat DeLuna)	Black Magic

== Music videos ==
Year	Song	Director
2007	"Whine Up" (English & Spanish Version) (featuring Elephant Man)	Gil Green
2007	"Am I Dreaming"	Jessy Terrero
2007	"Cut Off Time" (Omarion featuring Kat DeLuna)	—N/a
2008	"Run the Show" (featuring Busta Rhymes)	Ray Kay
2008	"Run the Show" (Spanish Version) (featuring Don Omar)	Ray Kay
2008	"Breathing Your Love" (Darin featuring Kat DeLuna)	Marcus Lundin
2008	"In the End"	Ray Kay
2009	"Unstoppable" (featuring Lil Wayne)	Tyrone Edmond
2010	"Push Push" (featuring Akon)	Sarah Chatfield
2010	"Party O'Clock"	Jake Realisatur
2011	"Dancing Tonight" (featuring Fo Onnasis)	Tyrone Edmond
2011	"I'm Alright" (Jean-Roch featuring Flo Rida & Kat DeLuna)	Arno Bani
2011	"Drop It Low"	Tyrone Edmond
2011	"Tonite" (Nicola Fasano featuring Kat DeLuna)	Gianluca Calu Montesano
2011	"Tonite" (Steve Forest & Nicola Fasano Remix) (Nicola Fasano featuring Kat DeLuna)	Gianluca Calu Montesano
2012	"I Had a Dream" (David Latour featuring Kat DeLuna & Fo Onassis)	Justin Purser
2012	"Wanna See U Dance (La La La)"	Tyrone Edmond
2012	"Wild Girl" (featuring DJ Yass Carter)	—N/a
2012	"Shake It" (Dam'Edge featuring Kat DeLuna & Fatman Scoop)	—N/a
2013	"Always on My Mind" (featuring Costi)	—N/a
2013	"Always on My Mind" (Caribbean Version) (featuring Costi)	—N/a
2015	"Bum Bum" (featuring Trey Songz)	Tyrone Edmond
2016	"What a Night" (featuring Jeremih)	Tyrone Edmond
2016	"Nobody" (Faydee featuring Kat DeLuna & Leftside)	—N/a
2018	"Nueva Actitud" (featuring Arcangel)	Lanz Pierce
2019	"Last Night In Miami"	Tyrone Edmond
2019	"Only One"	Tyrone Edmond
2023	"Hottie With A Body"	Alfredo Flores
2024	"Kruela"	Tyrone Edmond
2026	"Mala Mía"	Tyrone Edmond
2026	"Move Your Cadera"	—N/a

=== Guest appearances ===
Year	Song	Director
2007	"Sexy Lady" (Yung Berg featuring Junior)	—N/a
2010	"Somos El Mundo 25 Por Haiti" (Artists for Haiti)	—N/a
2012	"8 Days a Week" (Jean-Roch featuring Timati)	—N/a

== Notes ==
- A Not released in the US.
- B "Run the Show" did not enter the Billboard Hot 100 but peaked on the Bubbling Under Hot 100 Singles chart at number seventeen.
- C "Cut Off Time" did not enter the Billboard Hot 100 but peaked on the Bubbling Under Hot 100 Singles chart at number twenty-three.
