= Stars (Kat DeLuna song) =

Single by Kat DeLuna

from the album Loading
- Released: May 15, 2013
- Genre: Dance, Pop
- Length: 3:46
- Label: eOne; Manhattan Recordings, Global Music Brand
- Songwriters: Kat DeLuna, Ashley Rose Collier
- Producers: Jordan "Trackstorm" Houyez; Djibril Gibson Kagni; Tyrone Edmond

Kat DeLuna singles chronology
"Wild Girl" (2012)	"Stars" (2013)	"Bum Bum" (2015)

"Stars" is a song by American singer Kat DeLuna. It was released on May 15, 2013, in the US and elsewhere on August 27, 2013. It was originally recorded to appear on DeLuna's planned third studio album, "Viva Out Loud" and was marketed as the third single from the project. It was eventually featured on her 2016 compilation album "Loading". It was written by DeLuna and Ashley Rose Collier and was produced by Jordan "Trackstorm" Houyez, Djibril Gibson Kagni and Tyrone Edmond. Commercially, the song charted on the US Billboard Dance Club Songs and Hot Dance/Electronic Songs.

== Background and production ==
"Stars" was written by DeLuna and Ashley Rose Collier and was produced by Jordan "Trackstorm" Houyez, Djibril Gibson Kagni and Tyrone Edmond. It was recorded at the Blue Jay Studio in Florida. It was created for DeLuna's planned third studio album, "Viva Out Loud". It was originally released in the US as a promotional single. Following its success, "Stars" was marketed as an international single and the second official single released in Japan. "Viva Out Loud" was planned to be her sophomore release in the US, which DeLuna viewed as "a long time coming". She told a reporter from Adelante Magazine that she worked hard on the album and described it as "a musical experience the same as a growth experience." "Stars" served as the projects overall third single, following the release of "Wanna See U Dance (La La La)" and "Wild Girl", which were also dance tracks.

"Stars" is stylised as a dance track that features elements related to the electronic dance music that had become popular again. DeLuna's record label in Japan, Manhattan Recordings promoted "Stars" as a dance song that blends into a "catchy and tearful melody".

By October 2014, DeLuna indicated via her official website that she still planned to release "Viva Out Loud". "Stars" was eventually featured on both the International and Japanese versions of DeLuna's 2016 compilation album, "Loading".

== Critical reception ==
Brad Stern from MTV included "Stars" in the brand's "5 must-hear pop songs of the week" feature. He praised the single with the opener "there are three guarantees in life: death, taxes, and Kat DeLuna bangas." Stern opined that in a fashion "typical" of DeLuna, the song is "yet another scorcher full of energetic four-to-the-floor beat blasts, infectious post-chorus chanting, and that signature DeLuna fiya, sure to please any bona fide Lunatic." He concluded that the song was similar to the energy created via DeLuna's previous single, "Party O'Clock". Vojtěch Drobík from Musicserver.cz described "Stars" as a "proper mainstream rhyme" that became addictive with listening. Drobík believed that the production team could have been inspired by the Armin van Buuren song "In and Out of Love" when they created "Stars". He concluded that "Stars" had the potential to become a "hit" song for DeLuna.

== Commercial performance ==
DeLuna debuted the song and official lyric video for "Stars" via her YouTube channel on May 8, 2013. DeLuna's previous singles from the planned album failed to chart it in the US. Though "Stars" debuted on the US Dance Club Songs (Billboard) chart on June 29, 2013 entering at number forty-six. It peaked at number two on the week of August 24, 2013. It spent a total of fourteen weeks on the chart. On the week commencing 20 July 2013, "Stars" peaked at number forty-eight on the US Hot Dance/Electronic Songs Billboard chart.

== Track listing and formats ==
- Digital download
1. "Stars" – 3:46
- South East Asia Digital EP
1. "Stars" – 2:56
2. "Stars" (KAPPA Remix Radio) – 3:30
3. "Stars" (KAPPA Remix Extended) – 7:26

== Credits and personnel ==
Credits adapted from "Loading" CD album liner notes.

- Kat DeLuna - vocals
- Kathleen DeLuna – writer
- Ashley Rose Collierr – writer
- Jordan "Trackstorm" Houyez – producer, instruments
- Djibril Gibson Kagni – producer, instruments
- Tyrone Edmond – producer
- James Zaner – recorder
- Felipe Tichauer - mastering
- Keith Ross - mixer
- Blue Jay Studio – mixing location

== Charts ==
Chart (2013)	Peak position
US Dance Club Songs (Billboard)	2
US Hot Dance/Electronic Songs (Billboard)	48

== Release history ==
Country	Release date	Format
US	May 15, 2013	Digital download
Japan	May 15, 2013	Digital download
Asia	August 27, 2013	Digital download
