= Inside Out: The Mixtape =

Inside Out:The Mixtape

Mixtape by Kat DeLuna
- Released: September 10, 2010
- Recorded: 2009–2010
- Genres: Dance-pop; R&B
- Length: 36:52
- Label: Universal Motown
- Producer: RedOne

Inside Out: The Mixtape is the first official mixtape by American singer and songwriter Kat DeLuna. In September, during her mini promo tour in Belgium and then in France, DeLuna signed a new contract Universal Music Belgium. It was DeLuna's only release with the label.

The mixtape was released for fans on September 10, 2010.

== Track listing ==
No.	Title	Writer(s)	Producer(s)	Length
1.	"Push Push" (featuring Akon)	Kat DeLuna, Tiwa Savage, T. Johnson, N. Atweh, A. Thiam	Radio	3:09
2.	"Dance Bailalo"	DeLuna, Tasleema Yasin, Andras Vleminckx	Andras Vleminckx	3:27
3.	"Unstoppable" (featuring Lil Wayne)	Nadir Khayat, Dwayne Carter, Jr.	RedOne	3:49
4.	"Calling You"	Khayat, DeLuna, Frankie Storm	RedOne	3:47
5.	"Be There"	DeLuna, Hamid, Heather Bright	Andras Vleminckx	3:57
6.	"Club On Smash"	DeLuna, Hamid	RedOne	4:39
7.	"Party O'Clock"	Nadir Khayat, Bilal Hajji, DeLuna, Kee Hamid	RedOne	3:35
8.	"Everybody Dance" (featuring Elephant Man)	Khayat, DeLuna, Hamid	RedOne	4:58
9.	"New York City Gurls" (featuring Onasis)	Khayat, DeLuna, Frankie Storm		3:48
10.	"Turn Me Up"	DeLuna, Hamid, Bright		3:44
11.	"Put It On" (featuring Lil Wayne)	Khayat, Hamid, Carter	RedOne	4:49
12.	"Make Love" (featuring Akon)	Khayat, Hamid, Bright	RedOne	3:47
13.	"Need You Now"	Khayat, Hamid	RedOne	4:49
14.	"A Change (Tribute to Haiti)"	Khayat, Hamid, Bright	RedOne	3:46

- "New York City Gurls" samples "California Gurls" by Katy Perry.
