= Loading (Kat DeLuna album) =

2016 compilation album by Kat DeLuna

Compilation album by Kat DeLuna
- Released: August 5, 2016
- Recorded: 2011–2016
- Genres: Pop; R&B; dance-pop; tropical music
- Length: 34:50 (standard); 77:28 (deluxe)
- Label: Entertainment One
- Producers: Tyrone Edmond; Robin Henriquez; Da Beat Freakz; Andras Vleminckx; Jonas Jeberg; Djibril Gibson Kagni; Jordan Houyez; Lynx

Kat DeLuna chronology
| Inside Out (2010) | Loading (2016) | Loading (Japanese Version) - EP (2016) |

Singles from Loading
- 1. "Drop It Low" Released: May 10, 2011; 2. "Wanna See U Dance (La La La)" Released: July 11, 2012; 3. "Sobredosis" Released: September 26, 2012; 4. "Wild Girl" Released: April 23, 2013; 5. "Stars" Released: August 27, 2013; 6. "Bum Bum" Released: March 30, 2015; 7. "What a Night" Released: February 26, 2016; 8. "Forever" Released: August 19, 2016; 9. "Waves" Released: September 23, 2016

Loading is the third studio album by American singer Kat DeLuna. It was released on August 5, 2016, through Entertainment One. Conceived as a transition project for her then-upcoming album Viva Out Loud, it is a compilation of previously released singles and new songs. Loading is a pop and R&B record with dance, house and Latin influences.

Loading was supported by several singles which were moderate hits in Europe. Upon release, the album received negative reviews for being too diverse and mixing too many genres, making DeLuna lose her artistic direction.

A deluxe edition was exclusively released in Japan with five additional songs that were later released as a Japan-exclusive EP.

== Background ==
DeLuna released her sophomore album Inside Out (2010) in selected European countries and Japan through Universal Motown and Manhattan Recordings respectively. The album was described as her sophomore European album before releasing her sophomore American one.

Tentatively named Viva Out Loud, the album was announced with the release of then-first single "Drop It Low" on May 10, 2011. Ultimately, the song ended up being the lead single of the Japanese edition of Inside Out, which was released on July 13, 2011.

In 2012, DeLuna released "Wanna See U Dance (La La La)", the new lead single from Viva Out Loud. A series of standalone singles were then released to promote the album, including "Sobredosis", "Wild Girl" and "Stars". In 2015, DeLuna released "Bum Bum" featuring American singer Trey Songz as the new lead single from the album. However, the single "What a Night" featuring Jeremih was released on February 26, 2026 and was described as the first single from the project.

After years of postponing, DeLuna decided to compile the previously released singles as a full-length album to thank her fans for waiting so long and giving them access to songs that had been sitting unreleased.

== Conception ==
"It’s been a while since I’ve come out with an album here in the United States. So to introduce the new sound that I have would maybe be too abrupt. So what we wanted to do was give a compilation of songs that I’ve done in the near past and include a few new songs that have the same style that I’m working on now."

— DeLuna, explaining the concept of the album

Before releasing Loading, DeLuna and her team got the idea of giving fans a taste of what they could expect from her next album. Explaining the title, DeLuna said the compilation was a teaser loading up to Viva Out Loud, as when "you log into a website and you click on a link to go to the other page and it just starts to load and you see the actual loading sign".

She described the album as composed of old songs with updated production and brand new songs, saying "Loading is going to include a compilation of a few colors of me from before and a few new colors. [...] It’s going to introduce everyone to VIVA."

== Music and lyrics ==
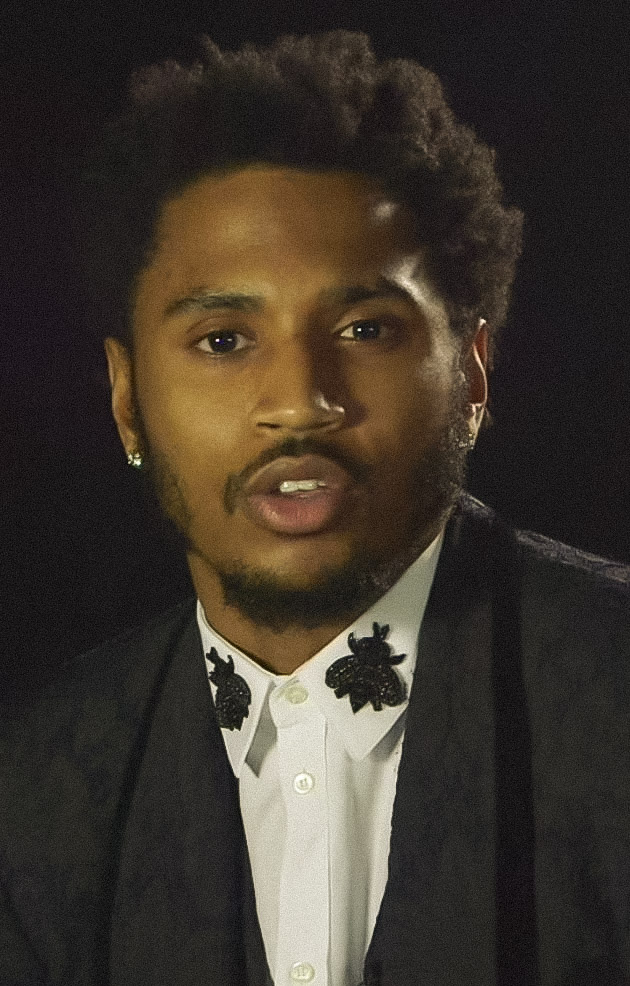
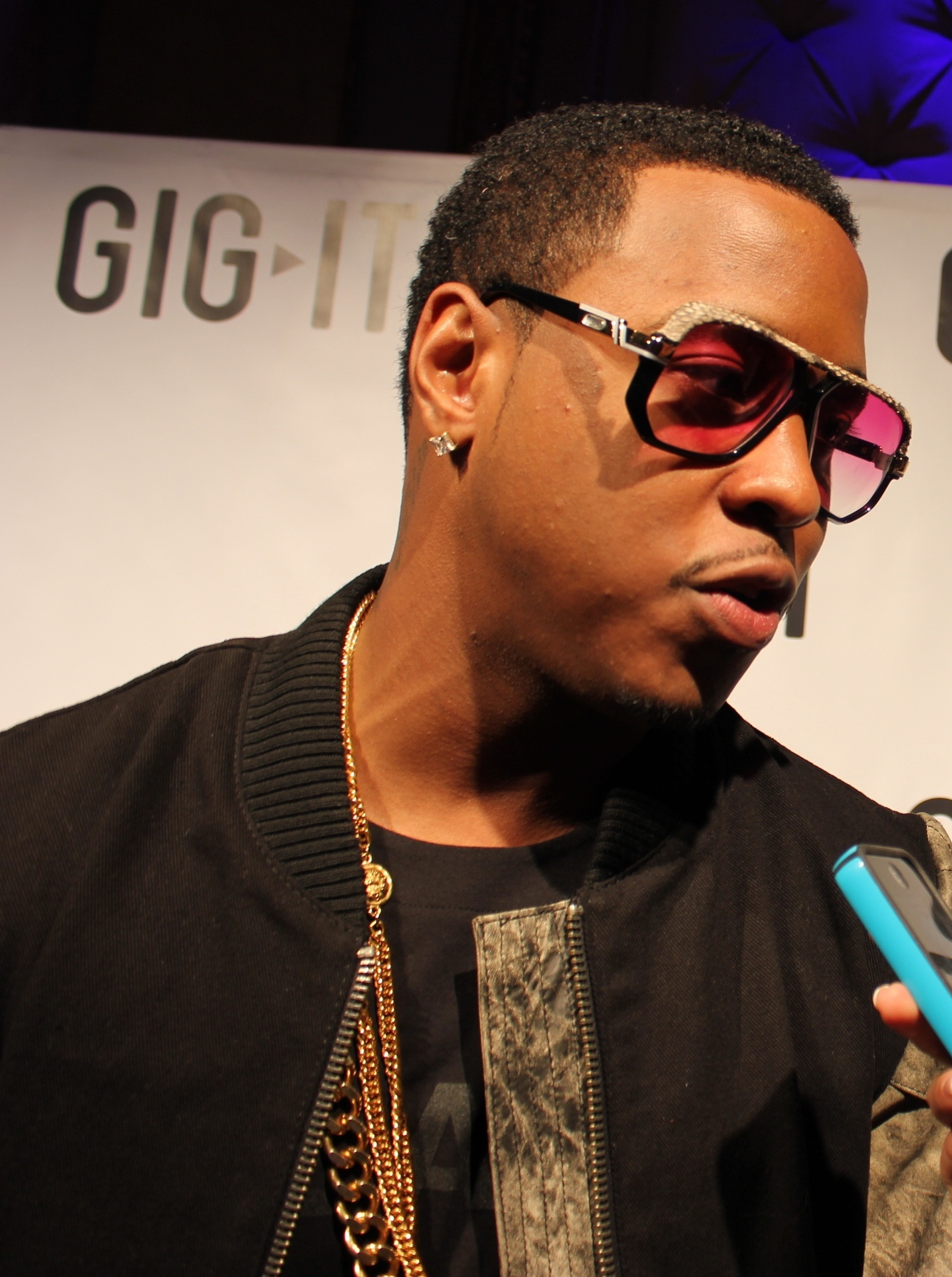
Trey Songz (left) and Jeremih (right) featured on DeLuna's singles.

Loading is a pop album which incorporates R&B and dance elements with influences of Latin music. Andy Kellman of AllMusic described the album as "a stylistic patchwork […] that includes Jamaican, Latin, Southern U.S., and European flavorings". Several songs on the project contain samples and interpolations.

The opening track, "Close My Eyes", is a romantic mid-tempo R&B/pop ballad with reggae and Caribbean influences who sees DeLuna missing someone deeply and feeling connected to them, even when they are not physically present. The lyrics focus on memories, desires and imagning being reunited with a loved one. A demo version of the song featuring Jamaican rapper Shaggy leaked in 2013. "Betting On Love" is an R&B song with tropical and Latin-pop influences about taking an emotional risk and gambling on a relationship and choosing to believe in love despite uncertainty. The third track "What A Night", is a retro-inspired dance-pop/R&B song that blends modern club production with a soul-pop feel, built around the hook from "December, 1963 (Oh, What a Night)" by American rock band The Four Seasons. It contains lyrics about capturing a memorable night out and the feeling that a particular moment could become unforgettable. "Drop It Low" is a club-oriented dance-pop song with electro and reggaeton influences, driven by electronic synths and Latin rhythmic elements. The track is about letting loose on the dance floor, showing confidence and moving to the rhythm. The fifth track, "Paradise", is a dreamy tropical dance-pop song with R&B and reggae influences and island-inspired rhythms that features themes of love and escapism. The lyrics describe turning a relationship into a personal paradise and being transported somewhere beautiful through love and attraction. An early version of the song was leaked in 2011. "Wanna See U Dance (La La La)" is a dance-pop song that fuses Latin pop, Brazilian samba and electro-house. It is built around samba-inspired percussions with an electronic dance production and a big chant-like “la la la” hook which is incorporated from "Tombo in 7/4" by Brazilian musician Airto Moreira. The track is an invitation to dance and let go of inhibitions. The seventh song, "Getaway", is an intimate pop/R&B ballad about wanting to leave everyday life with someone special and create a private world together. The idea of a “getaway” works as both a physical escape and an emotional one—a relationship becoming a place of comfort and freedom. The eight track, "Bum Bum", features American singer Trey Songz and is a reggae/dancehall-influenced pop song which samples and interpolates "Bam Bam" by Jamaican singer Sister Nancy and Shaggy and Rikrok's "It Wasn't Me". The song themes deal with sexual confidence, physical attraction, seduction and being comfortable showing off and embracing their body. "Stars" is a dreamy, romantic pop song with electronic and dance-pop touches about believing that two people are meant to find each other. The song uses the imagery of stars and the night sky to express hope and romance. "Sobredosis" is a Latin tropical-pop song, featuring Dominican singer El Cata with merengue and bachata influences using Latin percussion, tropical rhythms and dance-oriented production. The lyrics finds DeLuna “overdosing” on love, kisses and the feeling of being addicted to someone’s affection. “Wild Girl“ is a high-energy pop-dance collaboration with DJ Yass Carter with lyrics celebrating independence and flirtation where the "wild" label is a statement of identity.

"Make Me Sweat" is a sensual, tropical dance-pop song with lyrics focusing on longing for a partner's touch and the excitement of reconnecting after being apart. "Waves" is a tropical-house pop song about being completely swept away by someone's love, using ocean imagery (currents, sinking) to portray the feeling of losing control when you're attracted by someone. "No Another Me" is a pop-R&B track seeing DeLuna singing about self-worth and refusing to be replaced in a relationship. "Over You", featuring Nigerian singer Yemi Alade, is a breakup-and-healing pop-R&B track with lyrics about finally detaching from someone who’s been emotionally draining and no longer reciprocates love. "Forever" is a pop-dance song featuring Jamaican singer Natel centered on commitment, lasting love and wanting a relationship that endures beyond time.

== Critical reception ==
Upon its release, Loading received negative reviews from critics. Andy Kellman of Allmusic called the album "a stylistic patchwork that comes across as diverse to the point of desperation, like neither DeLuna nor anyone in her camp knows which direction she should take". He described "What a Night" as a "bounding DJ Mustard knockoff" and "Bum Bum" as a "boilerplate reggae-pop fusion that does its best to ruin the Sister Nancy classic "Bam Bam" for everyone". However, Kellman complimented "Sobredosis", stating it's "the album's most energized and powerful cut".

== Track listing ==
Standard edition
| No. | Title | Writer(s) | Producer(s) | Length |
|---|---|---|---|---|
| 1. | "Close My Eyes" | Kat DeLuna; Tyrone Edmond; O.G. Black; Robin Henriquez | Henriquez | 3:53 |
| 2. | "Betting On Love" | DeLuna; Shaina Steitz; Adolfo Ramirez Bruno; Kristen Lasala; Henriquez | Henriquez | 4:00 |
| 3. | "What a Night" (featuring Jeremih) | Jeremy Felton; Edmond; George M. Ladkani; Samuel Jean; Da Beat Freakz; RG | Da Beat Freakz; RG | 3:04 |
| 4. | "Drop It Low (Fatman Scoop Mix)" | DeLuna; Edmond; Andras Vleminckx | Vleminckx | 3:42 |
| 5. | "Paradise" | DeLuna; Christian German Batista; Henriquez; Edmond | Henriquez | 3:20 |
| 6. | "Wanna See U Dance (La La La)" | DeLuna; Kalenna Harper; Henriquez | Edmond; Lynx | 3:10 |
| 7. | "Getaway" | DeLuna; Edmond; Atosa Scherezad Ghasripoor; Henriquez | Henriquez | 3:26 |
| 8. | "Bum Bum" (featuring Trey Songz) | DeLuna; Sam Hook; Shaun Pizzonia; Braun Thompson; Orville Burrell; Rickardo Ducent; Ophlin Russell-Myers | Alex "A-Wall" Reversion | 3:07 |
| 9. | "Stars" | Ashley Rose Collier; Djibril Kagni; Jordan Houyez; Hannon Lane | Kagni; Houyez; Edmond | 2:55 |
| 10. | "Sobredosis" (featuring El Cata) | DeLuna; Richard Peña; Edward Bello Pou | Peña; Bello Pou | 3:47 |
| Total length: | | | | 34:50 |

Japan Deluxe Edition
| No. | Title | Writer(s) | Producer(s) | Length |
|---|---|---|---|---|
| 1. | "Waves" | Allison Kaplan; Rhian Laura Allison; Clinton Sparks; Matthew Tishler; Andrew Underberg | — (not publicly verified) | 3:49 |
| 2. | "What a Night" (featuring Jeremih) | Jeremy Felton; Edmond; Ladkani; Jean; Da Beat Freakz; RG | Da Beat Freakz; RG | 3:04 |
| 3. | "Make Me Sweat" | DeLuna; Daniel Mizrahi; Rachael Leon Yelena; Joel David Santos Aguiar; Aurora Joan Pfeiffer | Mantra | 3:51 |
| 4. | "Forever" (featuring Natel) | DeLuna; Ramirez Bruno | — (not publicly verified) | 3:23 |
| 5. | "Wild Girl" (featuring DJ Yass Carter) | Alex Joerg Christensen; James John Abrahart Jr.; Richard Oscar Seibold; Houyez; Kagni | Yacine Baki | 3:58 |
| 6. | "Over You" (featuring Yemi Alade) | DeLuna; Yemi Eberechi Alade; Uche Ebele; Obi Ebele; Herald Aitatus; Giovanni Casu; Skylar Mones; Oceana Mahlmann; Hamza Haimami | Da Beat Freakz | 3:12 |
| 7. | "Close My Eyes" | DeLuna; Edmond; O.G. Black; Henriquez | Henriquez | 3:53 |
| 8. | "Bum Bum" (featuring Trey Songz) | DeLuna; Hook; Pizzonia; Thompson; Burrell; Ducent; Russell-Myers | A-Wall | 3:07 |
| 9. | "No Another Me" | — (not publicly verified) | — (not publicly verified) | 4:07 |
| 10. | "Stars" | Collier; Kagni; Houyez; Lane | Kagni; Houyez; Edmond | 2:55 |
| 11. | "Getaway" | DeLuna; Edmond; Ghasripoor; Henriquez | Henriquez | 3:26 |
| 12. | "Wanna See U Dance (La La La)" | DeLuna; Harper; Henriquez | Edmond; Lynx | 3:10 |
| 13. | "Drop It Low (Fatman Scoop Mix)" | DeLuna; Edmond; Vleminckx | Vleminckx | 3:42 |
| 14. | "What a Night" (DBB “Tropical” Remix featuring Jeremih) | Jeremy Felton; Edmond; Ladkani; Jean; Da Beat Freakz; RG | Da Beat Freakz; RG | 3:56 |
| 15. | "What a Night" (2WISTED Remix featuring Jeremih) | Jeremy Felton; Edmond; Ladkani; Jean; Da Beat Freakz; RG | Da Beat Freakz; RG | 5:53 |
| 16. | "Waves" (DJ FUMI★YEAH! Remix) | Kaplan; Allison; Sparks; Tishler; Andrew Underberg | — (not publicly verified) | 3:33 |
| Total length: | | | | 77:28 |

Notes

- "What A Night" contains an interpolation of "December, 1963 (Oh, What a Night)" by The Four Seasons
- "Wanna See U Dance (La La La)" contains a sample from "Tombo in 7/4" Airto Moreira
- "Bum Bum" contains an interpolation of "Bam Bam" by Sister Nancy and "It Wasn't Me" by Shaggy and Rikrok

== Release history ==
Release history and formats for Loading
| Region | Date | Format(s) | Label | Ref. |
|---|---|---|---|---|
| Various | August 5, 2016 | CD; digital download | Entertainment One | |
| Japan | October 7, 2016 | CD; digital download | Manhattan Recordings | |
