= Sebastian Jones =

Sebastian Jones may refer to:

- Sebastian Jones (television producer), American television producer and writer
- Sebastian Graham Jones (1947–2014), British actor and director
- Sebastian LaMar Jones (born 1986), American record producer, songwriter and DJ
- Sebastian Jones (filmmaker), American film director, screenwriter, and editor
