= What a Night (Kat DeLuna song) =

Single by Kat DeLuna featuring Jeremih

from the album Loading
- Released: February 26, 2016
- Recorded: 2016
- Genre: R&B, club
- Length: 3:04
- Label: eOne
- Songwriters: Jeremih Felton; George M. Ladkani; Samuel Jean; Tyrone Edmond; Da Beat Freakz, RG
- Producers: Da Beat Freakz, RG

Kat DeLuna singles chronology
"Bum Bum" (2015)	"What a Night" (2016)	"Waves" (2016)

Jeremih singles chronology
"Body" (2016)	"What a Night" (2016)	"Enemiez" (2016)

"What a Night" is a song by American singer Kat DeLuna featuring Jeremih. It was released on February 26, 2016, and appeared on DeLuna's compilation album Loading (2016). The song was written by Jeremih, George M. Ladkani, Samuel Jean, Tyrone Edmond, and the duo Da Beat Freakz. A remix featuring English rapper Stefflon Don was released on August 26, 2016.

The song contains a sample of "December, 1963 (Oh, What a Night)" by American pop rock band The Four Seasons.

== Music video ==
The music video for "What a Night" premiered on March 1, 2016, on DeLuna's Vevo channel. It was directed by Haitian-born model Tyrone Edmond.

== Charts ==
Chart (2016)	Peak position
US Rhythmic Airplay (Billboard)	25

== Certifications ==
Certifications for What a Night"
Region	Certification	Certified units/sales
New Zealand (RMNZ)	Gold	15,000^{‡}
^{‡} Sales+streaming figures based on certification alone.
