= Welcome to St. Tropez =

2011 single by DJ Antoine and Timati

Single by DJ Antoine vs Timati featuring Kalenna

from the album 2011
- Released: 6 May 2011
- Recorded: 2010
- Genre: Electro house; hip hop
- Length: 3:15
- Label: Houseworks
- Songwriters: Fabio Antoniali; Djibril Gibson Kagni; Antoine Konrad; Kalenna Harper; Timur Yunusov; Theron Thomas

DJ Antoine singles chronology
"S'Beschte" (2009)	"Welcome to St. Tropez" (2011)	"Sunlight" (2011)

Music video
- "Welcome to St. Tropez (DJ Antoine vs Mad Mark Remix)" on YouTube

"Welcome to St. Tropez" (/ˌsæn troʊˈpeɪ/ SAN troh-PAY) is a song by Swiss DJ and record producer DJ Antoine taken from his studio album 2011. It features vocals by Russian rapper Timati and American singer-songwriter Kalenna. Originally, the song is by Timati and Russian singer Blue Marine. The song became a top-ten hit in Austria, France, Germany, the Netherlands, Poland, Romania and Switzerland.

== Music video ==
There are two versions of the music video. Kalenna does not appear in either versions. In the first version DJ Antoine is on stage wearing a red velvet jumpsuit and throwing different colored pairs of sunglasses into the audience, while clapping and waving around his hands in St. Tropez, singing at some clubs and doing several activities such as riding a horse bareback. There are several scenes showing people laughing. The second version features additional scenes with DJ Antoine driving a Ferrari dressed in a clown costume.

== Chart performance ==
=== Weekly charts ===
2009 weekly chart performance for original version by Timati
Chart (2009)	Peak position
Ukraine Airplay (TopHit)	63

2011 weekly chart performance for original version by Timati
Chart (2011)	Peak position
CIS Airplay (TopHit)	20
Russia Airplay (TopHit)	14
Switzerland (Schweizer Hitparade)	45
Ukraine Airplay (TopHit)	170

DJ Antoine version

Weekly chart performance for DJ Antoine version
Chart (2011–2014)	Peak position
Austria (Ö3 Austria Top 40)	4
Belgium (Ultratop 50 Flanders)	9
Belgium (Ultratop 50 Wallonia)	17
Brazil Billboard Hot 100 Airplay	11
Czech Republic Airplay (ČNS IFPI)	2
Czech Republic Singles Digital (ČNS IFPI)	73
France (SNEP)	7
Germany (GfK)	3
Hungary (Dance Top 40)	3
Hungary (Rádiós Top 40)	5
Hungary (Single Top 40)	3
Luxembourg (Billboard)	1
Netherlands (Dutch Top 40)	7
Netherlands (Single Top 100)	10
Poland Dance (ZPAV)	1
Romania (Romanian Top 100)	1
Romania TV Airplay (Media Forest)	1
Russia (Russian Music Charts)	21
Slovakia Airplay (ČNS IFPI)	6
Spain (Promusicae)	16
Switzerland (Schweizer Hitparade)	2

=== Year-end charts ===
2011 year-end chart performance for DJ Antoine version
Chart (2011)	Position
Austria (Ö3 Austria Top 40)	12
Belgium (Ultratop Flanders)	50
Belgium (Ultratop Wallonia)	84
France (SNEP)	43
Germany (Official German Charts)	21
Hungary (Dance Top 40)	30
Hungary (Rádiós Top 40)	76
Netherlands (Dutch Top 40)	40
Netherlands (Single Top 100)	51
Poland (Dance Top 50)	2
Romania (Romanian Top 100)	17
Switzerland (Schweizer Hitparade)	6

2012 year-end chart performance for DJ Antoine version
Chart (2012)	Position
Hungary (Dance Top 40)	36
Hungary (Rádiós Top 40)	99
Italy (FIMI)	94

== Certifications ==
Certifications for "Welcome to St. Tropez"
Region	Certification	Certified units/sales
Germany (BVMI)	2× Platinum	600,000^{‡}
Italy (FIMI)	Platinum	30,000^{*}
Switzerland (IFPI Switzerland)	3× Platinum	90,000^{^}
^{*} Sales figures based on certification alone.^{^} Shipments figures based on certification alone.^{‡} Sales+streaming figures based on certification alone.

== See also ==
- 2011 in music
- List of top 100 singles of 2011 (France)
- List of Romanian Top 100 number ones of the 2010s
