= Inside Out (Kat DeLuna album) =

Studio album by Kat DeLuna
- Released: November 5, 2010
- Length: 38:33
- Labels: Universal Motown, ARS Entertainment, Manhattan Recordings
- Producers: Tyrone Edmond; Troy "Radio" Johnson; RedOne; Andras Vleminckx

Kat DeLuna chronology
9 Lives (2007)	Inside Out (2010)	Loading (2016)

Singles from Inside Out
- 1. "Push Push" Released: 16 April 2010; 2. "Party O'Clock" Released: 22 October 2010; 3. "Dancing Tonight" Released: 22 February 2011; 4. "Drop It Low" Released: 10 May 2011; 5. "Boom Boom (Tequila)" Released: 5 July 2011

Inside Out is the second studio album by American singer Kat DeLuna. It was released exclusively to Belgium, France, Poland and Japan between November 5, 2010 and July 13, 2011. DeLuna released a buzz single, "Unstoppable", before the lead single of the album, "Push Push". It was officially released on April 16, 2010. The album was commercially successful in Belgium, debuting and peaking at number 16 on the official album's chart. The second single, "Party O'Clock" was released before November 5, 2010. A third single, "Dancing Tonight", was released on February 22, 2011 and became the #1 record on the Billboard Dance Charts in the United States. DeLuna released the fifth single from the album, "Drop It Low". "Boom Boom (Tequila)" was released as the sixth and final single from the album, It was exclusively released in Japan only.

== Background and development ==
In 2007, DeLuna released her debut album 9 Lives through Epic Records. Blending contemporary contemporary R&B, pop, Latin, and dancehall influences, an eclectic sound she described as "electro dance," it was primarily produced by RedOne and spawned three singles, including "Whine Up featuring Elephant Man, which became her breakthrough hit, reaching the top ten in Belgium in France, while also peaking at number 29 on the US Billboard Hot 100 and topping the Hot Dance Club Play. Although the album debuted at number 58 on the US Billboard 200 and underperformed commercially in the United States, it achieved stronger results internationally, reaching the top 20 in several European markets and earning a silver certification in France.

In October 2008, DeLuna announced her departure from Epic Records and commenced work on a follow-up to 9 Lives, initially scheduled for release in mid-2009 through Universal Motown. For the project, DeLuna was approached by 18-year-old Belgian producer Andras Vleminckx who initially contacted her via Twitter and was later granted a backstage meeting during one of her performances in Belgium. After presenting her with a CD of original beats, he secured her interest and was subsequently enlisted to collaborate on the album. The pair continued to develop the project remotely during her tour, working together through sessions conducted via Skype. Apart from Vleminckx, DeLuna reteamed with RedOne to work on several songs for Inside Out, with Tyrone Edmond and Troy "Radio" Johnson also contributing.

DeLuna announced the album would be titled "Inside Out" in February 2009. She revealed that it was originally intended to feature "over-the-top" ballads and pop music. DeLuna released "Unstoppable", which featured the rapper Lil Wayne and was originally marketed as the project's lead single. The song marked a departure from DeLuna's latin inspired songs featured on her debut album. "Unstoppable" made use of heavy auto-tune and guitar instrumentals. DeLuna revealed that the remainder of the planned songs for "Inside Out" would not rely as heavily on auto-tune, explaining "it's still very musical. It's still pop. It's very fun." DeLuna added that she was excited to show her audience more about herself and her experience in the music industry via the album.

In May 2009, DeLuna released "Dance Bailalo" as the second single from the project. DeLuna also detailed other songs planned to be featured on "Inside Out", via her official MySpace account. These included the title track "Inside Out" which was a song channelling heartbreak and vulnerability, the Lil Wayne collaboration, "Put it On" which employed a middle-eastern theme with tambourine and glass shattering sound affects. "Calling You", which was later featured on the Japanese edition of "Inside Out" was described as a "light-hearted club-banger".

DeLuna collaborated with singer, Akon for the single, "Push Push". She had previously worked with him on the 2007 song, "Am I Dreaming". Discussing working with him again, DeLuna told Ed Condran from Asbury Park Press that she was "fortunate" to work with "an amazing singer" who is "very talented" again.

In May 2010, it was reported that "Inside Out" was still scheduled to be released in the US during July 2010. On 13 July 2011, "Inside Out" was released in Japan via Manhattan Recordings with an alternate tracklist, which included the songs "Drop It Low", "Boom Boom (Tequila)" and "Move Your Body".

The single "Dancing Tonight" was released 22 February 2011. it reached number one on the US Dance Club Songs chart in May 2011.

== Singles ==
- "Unstoppable" – the first and only promotional single, released 22 January 2009.
- "Push Push" – the lead single, released 16 April 2010.
- "Party O'Clock" – the third single, released 22 October 2010.
- "Dancing Tonight" – the fourth single, released 22 February 2011.
- "Drop It Low" – First single from the Japanese version of the album, released 10 May 2011.
- "Boom Boom (Tequila)" – Second single from the Japanese version of the album, released 5 July 2011.

== Commercial performance ==
Inside Out attained moderate chart success in select European territories, though it performed notably below the commercial levels of her previous album, 9 Lives. The album was first released in Europe on November 5, 2010, Universal Motown. It achieved its strongest performance in the Flemish region of Belgium, peaking at number 16 on the Ultratop Flanders albums chart. In the Walloon region, it reached number 76 on the Ultratop Wallonia chart. The album also entered the French Albums Chart, where it attained a peak position of number 114. In Japan, Inside Out was released on July 13, 2011, by Mahattan Recordings and peaked at number 47 on the Oricon Albums Chart.

== Track listing ==
Inside Out track listing
No.	Title	Writer(s)	Producer(s)	Length
1.	"Push Push" (featuring Akon)	Kat DeLuna; Tiwa Savage; Troy Johnson; Nasri Atweh; Aliaune Thiam; Giorgio Tuinfort	RedOne	3:10
2.	"Party O’Clock"	DeLuna; Nadir Khayat; Bilal Hajji; Kee Hamid	RedOne	3:35
3.	"Dancing Tonight" (featuring Fo Onassis)	Sebastian LaMar Jones; Dallas Diamond; Andras Vleminckx; Deekly	Vleminckx; Tyrone Edmond	3:27
4.	"Be There"	DeLuna; Hamid; Heather Bright; Andras Vleminckx	Vleminckx; Edmond	3:52
5.	"Oh Yeah (La La La)"	DeLuna; Khayat; Hajji; Hamid	RedOne	3:35
6.	"One Foot Out of the Door"	DeLuna; Hamid; Vleminckx	Vleminckx; Edmond	3:42
7.	"All in My Head"	DeLuna; Khayat; Hamid	RedOne	3:40
8.	"Rock the House"	DeLuna; Khayat; Hamid	RedOne	2:55
9.	"Calling You"	DeLuna; Khayat; Frankie Storm	RedOne	3:14
10.	"Be There" (Ballad Version)	DeLuna; Hamid; Bright; Vleminckx	Vleminckx	3:44
11.	"Unstoppable" (featuring Lil Wayne)	Khayat; Hamid; Dwayne Carter, Jr.	RedOne	3:48
Total length:				38:33

International version
No.	Title	Writer(s)	Producer(s)	Length
10.	"Unstoppable" (featuring Lil Wayne)	Khayat; Hamid; Carter	RedOne	3:47
11.	"No Me Olvides"	DeLuna		3:43
12.	"Muevete Muevete"	DeLuna; Vleminckx		3:27

Japanese Version
No.	Title	Writer(s)	Length
1.	"Push Push" (featuring Akon)	DeLuna; Tiwa Savage; T. Johnson; N. Atweh; Thiam; G. Tuinfort	3:09
2.	"Dancing Tonight" (featuring Fo Onassis)	Jones; Dallas Diamond	4:04
3.	"Boom Boom (Tequila)"	DeLuna; C. Liggio; E. Serrano; P. Ortelli; L. DeGregorio; J. Biancale; M. Versini	3:38
4.	"Drop It Low" (featuring Fatman Scoop)	DeLuna; Andras Vleminckx	3:42
5.	"Oh Yeah (La La La)" (featuring Elephant Man)	Khayat; Hajji; DeLuna; Hamid	3:38
6.	"Party O’Clock"	Khayat; Hajji; DeLuna; Hamid	3:35
7.	"One Foot Out of the Door"	DeLuna; Hamid; Andras Vleminckx	3:44
8.	"Be There"	DeLuna; Hamid; Bright; Andras Vleminckx	3:51
9.	"Rock the House"	Khayat; DeLuna; Hamid	2:55
10.	"Unstoppable" (featuring Lil Wayne)	Khayat; Hamid; Carter, Jr.	3:51
11.	"Can You Love Me"	DeLuna; Khayat; Storm	3:08
12.	"Calling You"	Khayat; DeLuna; Storm	3:17
13.	"All in My Head"	Khayat; DeLuna; Hamid	3:42
14.	"Be There (Ballad Version)"	DeLuna; Hamid; Bright; Andras Vleminckx	3:45

Japanese Limited Edition
No.	Title	Writer(s)	Length
15.	"Move Your Body" (Hidden Track)	DeLuna	3:31

== Charts ==
Weekly chart performance for Inside Out
Chart (2010–11)	Peak position
Belgian Albums (Ultratop Flanders)	16
Belgian Albums (Ultratop Wallonia)	76
French Albums (SNEP)	114
Japanese Albums (Oricon)	47

== Release history ==
Release history and formats for Inside Out
Region	Date	Format(s)	Label	Ref.
Belgium	November 5, 2010	CD; digital download	Universal Motown; ARS Entertainment Belgium	
France	January 21, 2011	CD; digital download	Universal Motown; ARS Entertainment Belgium	
Poland	February 18, 2011	CD; digital download	Magic Records	
Japan	July 13, 2011	CD; digital download	Manhattan Recordings	
