= Enemiez =

Single by Keke Palmer featuring Jeremih
- Released: March 4, 2016
- Genre: Pop
- Length: 3:30
- Label: Island
- Songwriters: Jonas Jeberg; Sam Watters; David D. Brown; Jeremih Felton
- Producer: Jonas Jeberg

Keke Palmer singles chronology
"I Don't Belong to You" (2015)	"Enemiez" (2016)	"Wind Up" (2017)

Jeremih singles chronology
"What a Night" (2016)	"Enemiez" (2016)	"Pass Dat" (2016)

"Enemiez" is a song recorded by American singer Keke Palmer. It was released on March 4, 2016 by Island Records. The song, produced by Jonas Jeberg, features American singer Jeremih. "Enemiez" was written by Jeberg, Sam Watters, David D. Brown and Jeremih.

== Release ==
The song premiered online on March 3, 2016, and the next day was released as a single in the iTunes Store. Talking about the track, Palmer told Complex, "Sharing this first single off my upcoming album with Island is something I have been looking forward to for a long time!." The song was sent to US rhythmic radio on March 22, 2016.

== Critical reception ==
Rap-Up praised the song's production and wrote that Palmer "isn’t afraid to get raunchy". Idolator's Mike Wass described the song as a "slinky urban-pop jam that falls somewhere between ’90s Janet Jackson and modern day Ciara". According to Brennan Carley of Spin, the track showcases Palmer’s "brawny vocals" and "takes her to more mature ground as an entertainer". Madeline Roth from MTV wrote that both the song and the video have "major Aaliyah and Michael Jackson vibes".

== Music video ==
The music video for "Enemiez" was shot in Los Angeles, California, and was directed by Carly Cussen. It premiered on Palmer's VEVO channel on March 4, 2016.

The music video begins when a feud breaks out between two rival gangs and Keke Palmer breaks up a fight between them. While both groups run in opposite directions, Keke Palmer glances at the leader of the rival gang, and it's revealed that the video is related to Romeo and Juliet. Keke Palmer then starts to sing and begins dancing around an old warehouse. When Jeremih sings his verse, the leader of the rival gang is driving his car with plane tickets in his hand. Keke Palmer abandons the group and tries to run away but the leader runs after her. Keke Palmer does a dance number ending with her hand around his neck in an attempt to choke him, and she continues to run to the nearest exit. The video ends with her hugging the rival gang leader.

== Release history ==
Region	Date	Format	Label
United States	March 3, 2016	Digital download; streaming	Island
Worldwide	March 4, 2016	Digital download; streaming	Island
United States	March 22, 2016	Rhythmic adult contemporary	Island
