= Oh Africa =

Single by Akon featuring Keri Hilson
- Released: January 31, 2010
- Recorded: November 2009
- Genre: R&B; worldbeat
- Length: 3:21
- Label: Konvict; UpFront; SRC; Universal Motown
- Songwriters: Timothy Thomas; Theron Thomas
- Producers: Alexander "PrettyBoiFresh" Parhm, Jr

Akon singles chronology
| "Shut It Down" (2009) | "Oh Africa" (2010) | "Push Push" (2010) |

Keri Hilson singles chronology
| "Million Dollar Girl" (2010) | "Oh Africa" (2010) | "Got Your Back" (2010) |

Music video
- "Akon - Oh Africa (Official Video)" on YouTube

"Oh Africa" is a song performed by the artist Akon featuring Keri Hilson. The song is a charity single and was released to raise funds for Akon's charity 'Konfidence' to aid underprivileged children in Africa. The song was released as a digital download on 52nd Grammy Awards night, January 31, 2010, along with the video. The Soweto Gospel Choir and young singers from many countries are also featured on the single. The footballers Thierry Henry, Didier Drogba, Kaká, Fernando Torres, Lionel Messi, Frank Lampard, Michael Ballack and Andrei Arshavin make cameo appearances in the music video.

== Release ==
The song is the third song performed by these two artists, the first being "Change Me" featured on Keri's debut album In a Perfect World..., and the non-album track "Mic Check", the latter of which was produced by Timbaland. Pepsi has announced this as one of the official 2010 World Cup Theme Songs.

== Music video ==
A music video has been filmed and was released on Grammy Awards night on 31 January 2010. Directed by Gil Green, it starts off by showing a colourful room with a map of Africa, which then shows 4 people appearing playing drums with dust shooting up from them. They also appear wearing body paint with the same pattern as the wall. Akon then starts singing as more scenes of the drum players is shown. Keri starts singing as the screen is shown being decorated with moving paint in front of her. Akon shows up again with a young African choir, singing with a sunset background. Other various people are also shown. Then scene skips to the body paint room were different people are shown with their face painted, a different country for each as they sing along. Akon is also shown dancing with Keri in the room with the moving paint between scenes. More Keri shows as she sings as the choir scene comes up variously. A scene also shows Keri with the choir. The Footballers Thierry Henry, Didier Drogba, Kaká, Fernando Torres, Lionel Messi, Frank Lampard, Michael Ballack and Andrei Arshavin then are shown kicking water ballon like footballs hitting the wall as images appear of them, with similar body paint found on the single cover. Images of other scenes are also shown e.g. The African choir and Keri lying on a Zebra pattern like cover. The end shows a wall with the footballers cheering. VFX for "Oh Africa" were created by Baked FX.

== Track listing ==
1. "Oh Africa"
2. "Oh Africa" (Instrumental)
3. "Oh Africa" (Video)
4. "Oh Africa" (Making Of The Commercial)
5. "Oh Africa" (Making Of The Song)

== Charts ==
| Chart (2010) | Peak position |
|---|---|
| Denmark (Tracklisten) | 8 |
| Hungary (Single Top 40) | 4 |
| Switzerland (Schweizer Hitparade) | 52 |
| UK Singles (Official Charts) | 56 |

== Release history ==
| Region | Date | Format | Label |
|---|---|---|---|
| Worldwide | January 31, 2010 | Digital Download, CD single | Interscope, Universal |
