= Andras Vleminckx =

- Born: Andras Lars Vleminckx
- Origin: Belgium
- Genres: Pop, EDM, hip-hop
- Occupation: Record producer
- Instruments: Keyboard, Logic Pro, sampler
- Years active: 2008–present

Andras Vleminckx is a Belgian music producer, songwriter and audio engineer. He has produced songs for artists like Kat Deluna("Drop it Low", "Dancing Tonight"), Taio Cruz ("Positive"), and Tara McDonald ("Give Me More"). "Dancing Tonight" reached the #1 spot on the US Billboard Dance Chart.

== Writing and production credits ==
Title	Year	Artist(s)	Album	Writer(s)	Producer(s)	ref
"Cheat on you"	2008	Kaye Styles ft. Black Cherry	Main Event	Andras Vleminckx, Kaye Styles	Andras Vleminckx	
"Dance Bailalo"	2009	Kat Deluna		Kat Deluna, Andras Vleminckx, Tasleema Yasin	Andras Vleminckx	
"Dancing Tonight"	2011	Kat Deluna	Inside Out (Kat DeLuna album)	Kat Deluna, Andras Vleminckx, Jérôme Riouffreyt, Sebastian LaMar Jones, Dallas Diamond	Andras Vleminckx, Jérôme Riouffreyt	
"Lucky Day"	2011	Nicola Roberts	Cinderella's Eyes	Martina Sorbara, Dragonette, Nicola Roberts, Andras Vleminckx, Jérôme Riouffreyt	Andras Vleminckx, Jérôme Riouffreyt	
"Positive"	2011	Taio Cruz		Taio Cruz, Andras Vleminckx, Jérôme Riouffreyt	Taio Cruz, Andras Vleminckx, Jérôme Riouffreyt	
"LoveLife (Kate Ryan song)"	2010	Kate Ryan	Electroshock (Kate Ryan album)	Wolfgang Schrödl, Paul Drew, Greig Watts, Pete Barringer, Georgie Dennis	Anders Hansson, Felix Persson, Märta Grauers, Andras Vleminckx, Jérôme Riouffreyt)	
"Broken (Kate Ryan song)"	2010	Kate Ryan	Electroshock (Kate Ryan album)	Anders Hansson, Kate Ryan, Negin Djafari, Bernard Ansong	Anders Hansson, Felix Persson, Märta Grauers, Andras Vleminckx, Jérôme Riouffreyt)	
"Give me more"	2012	Tara McDonald	I like this beat	Tara McDonald, Luciana Caporaso, Andras Vleminckx, Jérôme Riouffreyt, Nick Clow, Maegan Cottone	Andras Vleminckx, Jérôme Riouffreyt	
"Fix of you"	2012	Tara McDonald	I like this beat	Tara McDonald, Maegan Cottone, Andras Vleminckx, Jérôme Riouffreyt	Andras Vleminckx, Jérôme Riouffreyt	
"Drop It Low (Kat DeLuna song)"	2011	Kat Deluna ft Fatman Scoop	Inside Out (Kat DeLuna album)	Kat Deluna, Andras Vleminckx	Andras Vleminckx	
"Drop It Low (remix)"	2011	Ace Hood ft Kat Deluna		Kat Deluna, Ace Hood, Andras Vleminckx	Andras Vleminckx	
"8 days a week"	2012	Jean-Roch ft Timati	Music saved my life	Jean-Roch, Timati, Andras Vleminckx, Jérôme Riouffreyt, Maegan Cottone	Andras Vleminckx, Jérôme Riouffreyt	
"Can U Feel It"	2012	Jean-Roch ft Tara McDonald	Music saved my life	Jean-Roch, Tara McDonald, Bill Conti, Andras Vleminckx, Jérôme Riouffreyt, Maegan Cottone	Andras Vleminckx, Jérôme Riouffreyt	
"Be there"	2011	Kat Deluna	Inside Out (Kat DeLuna album)	Kat Deluna, Andras Vleminckx, Hamid, Heather Bright	Andras Vleminckx	
"Be there (ballad version)"	2011	Kat Deluna	Inside Out (Kat DeLuna album)	Kat Deluna, Andras Vleminckx, Hamid, Heather Bright	Andras Vleminckx	
"One foot out of the door"	2011	Kat Deluna	Inside Out (Kat DeLuna album)	Kat Deluna, Andras Vleminckx, Hamid,	Andras Vleminckx	
"Muevete Muevete (ola ola)"	2011	Kat Deluna	Inside Out (Kat DeLuna album)	Kat Deluna, Andras Vleminckx	Andras Vleminckx	
"Hollywood"	2013	Mitchell Niemeyer		Andras Vleminckx, Jérôme Riouffreyt, Jonathan Mendelsohn	Andras Vleminckx, Jérôme Riouffreyt	
"RIOT"	2013	Nicolaz ft. Angelika Vee		Andras Vleminckx, Jérôme Riouffreyt, Fabian Lenssen, Angelika Vee	Andras Vleminckx, Jérôme Riouffreyt, Fabian Lenssen	
"Papaoutai (NICOLAZ official REMIX)"	2013	Stromae	"Papaoutai - EP"	Andras Vleminckx, Jérôme Riouffreyt	Andras Vleminckx, Jérôme Riouffreyt	
"Move (Deekly & Eightysix official remix)"	2013	Little Mix	Move (Remixes) - EP	Andras Vleminckx, Jérôme Riouffreyt	Andras Vleminckx, Jérôme Riouffreyt	
"Move (OVER XPSR official remix)"	2013	Little Mix	Move (Remixes) - EP	Andras Vleminckx, Jérôme Riouffreyt	Andras Vleminckx, Jérôme Riouffreyt	
"Not Alone"	2014	Kate Ryan		Kate Ryan, Benoît Mansion, Jérôme Riouffreyt, Gino Barletta, Andras Vleminckx, Angelica Vasilcov, Bert Elliott, Brett McGaulin	Andras Vleminckx, Jérôme Riouffreyt	
"Don't you dare"	2014	Taio Cruz		Taio Cruz, Andras Vleminckx, Jérôme Riouffreyt	Taio Cruz, Andras Vleminckx, Jérôme Riouffreyt	
"Runaway (Smalltown Boy)"	2015	Kate Ryan		Steve Bronski, Jimmy Somerville, Larry Steinbachek	Andras Vleminckx	
"Fading Away"	2015	LIMITS		Andras Vleminckx	Andras Vleminckx	
"Keep On"	2016	LIMITS		Andras Vleminckx, Jasper Publie	Andras Vleminckx	
"Fallin'"	2017	LIMITS		Andras Vleminckx, Domien Cnockaert	Andras Vleminckx	
"Acid ft. Romeo Elvis'"	2017	Ulysse		Arnaud Duynstee, Benoît Do Quang, Julien Gathy	Rec : Jean Vanesse @ GreenHouse Studio, Andras Vleminckx & L'Oeil Ecoute Laboratoire Mix : Jean Vanesse @ GreenHouse Studio & Andras Vlemnickx	
"Wrong Turn"	2018	Blanche_(singer)		Pierre Dumoulin, Andras Vleminckx, Ellie Delvaux	Patrick Wimberly	
"Moment"	2018	Blanche_(singer)		Pierre Dumoulin, Andras Vleminckx, Rich Cooper, Ellie Delvaux, Gilles Vogt, Liam Roth	Rich Cooper	
"Bring Me Down"	2018	Kate Ryan		Kate Ryan, Matthew James Humphrey, Franck Sanders, Tanika Tabitha	Andras Vleminckx	
"Falling"	2019	Tessa Dixson		Tessa Dixson, Joseph Hamill, Andras Vleminckx	Reinhard Vanbergen	
"Losing Our Connection"	2019	Promis3	Like Trying to Land on a Cloud - EP	Andras Vleminckx, Brent Dielen	Andras Vleminckx	
"Losing Our Connection (LIMITS remix)"	2019	Promis3		Andras Vleminckx, Brent Dielen	Andras Vleminckx	
"Chasing Waterfalls"	2019	Promis3	Like Trying to Land on a Cloud - EP	Andras Vleminckx, Brent Dielen	Andras Vleminckx	
"Chasing Waterfalls (LIMITS remix)"	2019	Promis3	Chasing Waterfalls (Remixes) - EP	Andras Vleminckx, Brent Dielen	Andras Vleminckx	
"Angels"	2019	Promis3	Like Trying to Land on a Cloud - EP	Andras Vleminckx, Brent Dielen	Andras Vleminckx	
"ICONS"	2019	Promis3	Like Trying to Land on a Cloud - EP	Andras Vleminckx, Brent Dielen	Andras Vleminckx	
"BLUE"	2019	Promis3	BLUE	Andras Vleminckx, Brent Dielen	Andras Vleminckx	
"Joan"	2019	Emma Bale	Joan	Jeroen De Pessemier, Ozan Bozdag, Kris Buckle, Emma Bale	Andras Vleminckx	
"Simulated Paradise"	2020	Promis3	Simulated Paradise	Brent Dielen, Andras Vleminckx	Andras Vleminckx	
