= Push Push (Kat Deluna song) =

Single by Kat DeLuna featuring Akon

from the album Inside Out
- Released: April 16, 2010
- Recorded: 2010
- Genre: Eurodance; electropop; EDM
- Length: 3:09
- Label: Universal Motown, Mercury Records, Universal Music France
- Songwriters: Kat DeLuna; Tiwa Savage; T. Johnson; N. Atweh; A. Thiam; G. Tuinfort
- Producer: RedOne

Kat DeLuna singles chronology
"Unstoppable" (2009)	"Push Push" (2010)	"Party O'Clock" (2010)

Akon singles chronology
"Oh Africa" (2010)	"Push Push" (2010)	"Body Bounce" (2010)

"Push Push" is a song by American singer and songwriter Kat DeLuna. It was released as the lead single from her second solo studio album, "Inside Out", on April 16, 2010. The song features American singer Akon and it was recorded and promoted both in English and Spanish. "Push Push" was written by DeLuna, Akon, Tiwa Savage, Nasri Atweh, T. Johnson and Giorgio Tuinfort and it was produced and recorded by Radio. DeLuna had previously worked with Akon on her 2007 single, "Am I Dreaming". Akon pitched the song to DeLuna after meeting her in a recording studio. She recalled going "crazy" for the song upon hearing it. "Push Push" is the only track on "Inside Out" to have a featured guest artist and DeLuna credited it as making the album feel "whole".

DeLuna filmed a music video for "Push Push", directed by Sarah Chatfield and it was released on June 16, 2010. DeLuna incorporated a dance routine for the video and it went viral on the internet. She was also styled in attire by Christian Siriano in the visual. DeLuna supported the release with live performances on US and Flemish television and radio shows, as well as music festivals and concerts. "Push Push" received label support in the form of official remixes from Claude Njoya and Richard Bahericz and it had a physical CD release in France. "Push Push" received positive reviews from critics and commercially it charted in Canada, Belgium and France and also charted on the latter two's year-end charts.

== Background ==
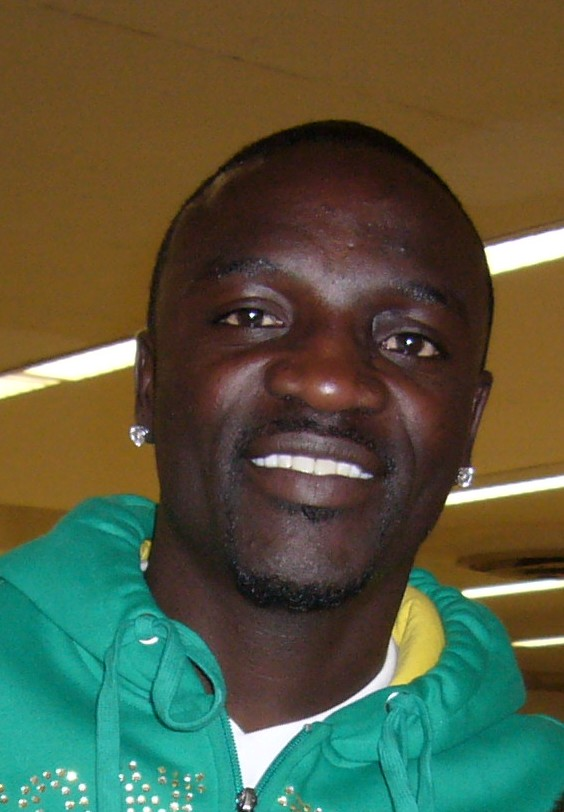
Featured artist, Akon (pictured) originally pitched "Push Push" to DeLuna in a recording studio.

"Push Push" features the American singer, Akon and it occurred after a chance meeting in a recording studio. Akon approached DeLuna and pitched the song to her. DeLuna recalled that "he played the beat and I went crazy." The Akon feature marked the second time DeLuna had worked with him, following their 2007 collaboration "Am I Dreaming". Discussing working with him again, DeLuna told Ed Condran from Asbury Park Press that "he's an amazing singer. He's also a very talented artist. I'm fortunate to work with someone like him." In another interview with Thibault Raoult, DeLuna revealed she was friends with Akon and praised his efforts adding, "he's incredible and, musically, he's a genius!" "Push Push" was written by DeLuna, Akon, Tiwa Savage, Nasri Atweh, T. Johnson and Giorgio Tuinfort and it was produced and recorded by Radio at Pulse Recording in Los Angeles.

The song was released as the lead single from her second album, "Inside Out". "Push Push" is the only song included on the album with a featured artist. DeLuna told a reporter from New York Daily News that the song made her album feel "whole", adding "The album was fantastic, but I just needed that one song. It's like '9 Lives', but taken to the next level." "Push Push" received a physical CD release in France and Belgium via Mercury Records and Universal Music France. It was also included as a B-side track on the vinyl release of DeLuna's single, "Dancing Tonight" in Japan. DeLuna also released official remixes of "Push Push" featuring Claude Njoya and Richard Bahericz.

== Music video ==
The music video for "Push Push" was directed by Sarah Chatfield and also features Akon. The visual was recorded on May 2, 2010, in Atlanta, Georgia. Prior to the video's release, DeLuna released a dance tutorial video for fans to learn her dance routines for the song. The dance routine went viral on the internet and DeLuna explained that "if you add a dance step to a song, it's gonna work." The official music video premiered June 16, 2010. DeLuna explained the concept behind the video:

[The] concept is basically having people look at me through a kaleidoscope as I show a more mature, fun side of me. And it contains a lot of beauty scenes while keeping the viewers and me on a very personal level because I'm literally focusing on singing to them and inviting them into my world.

In the video, DeLuna she wears attire designed by Christian Siriano, the winner of Project Runway season four. Siriano had also consulted with DeLuna about fashion visuals for "Inside Out" and her tour. In the video, DeLuna is stylised in one scene wearing a black body suit accessorised with crystals. DeLuna described her outfits in the visual as "colourful, dreamy clothing that is supposed to represent the freedom of the ocean."

== Critical reception ==
A critic from Seventeen described the song as a "addictive, soon-to-be dance club anthem". They assessed that DeLuna had a "funky new look" in the music video and stated they were "loving" her crystal themed bodysuit. They concluded that if DeLuna's future style was by comparison to the "Push Push" video, she would have "some amazing styles". A writer from New York Daily News branded "Push Push" as "a hyper-catchy collaboration" and believed the accompanying dance routine was key to its success. The result is a simple, fun and insanely catchy song with a multilayered oh-oh-oh refrain by DeLuna, a solid contribution from Akon on the bridge and a thumping beat that's sure to bring the house down at the club.

== Commercial performance ==
"Push Push" debuted on the Canadian Hot 100 at number eighty-four on the week commencing May 1, 2010. The song peaked at number fifty-nine on the Pistacubana ranking system for the most played songs on Cuban radio and television for the week commencing October 9, 2010.

== Live performances ==
DeLuna performed "Push Push" live on stage at Knott's Berry Farm on April 24, 2010. She performed the track live at the annual Puerto Rican Day Parade on June 13, 2010. She performed it live on Univision's Sábado Gigante television show on July 11, 2010. Also in July 2010, DeLuna performed the song on a yacht during a taping of Descontrol on Telemundo. She sang it during her set at 103.5 KTU's Beatstock event at the PNC Bank Arts Center in Holmdel, New Jersey on August 7, 2010. In September 2010, DeLuna performed "Push Push" at Loft Metropolis in Paris, France.

On November 12, 2011 she performed the song at Qmusic radio studios in Vilvoorde, Belgium to celebrate the radio station's tenth anniversary. DeLuna performed the song live on Alexis Valdés' talk-show "Esta Noche Tu Night" via Mega TV. She performed the official remix of "Push Push" live on-stage with Bahericz at the StarFloor 2010 music festival, which was held at the Palais Omni-Sports de Paris-Bercy arena on October 30, 2010. The song was subsequently included on the Universal Music France compilation album, "Starfloor - L'Album Dancefloor De L'Année". November 7, 2010, DeLuna performed "Push Push" and her follow up single, Party O'Clock on the Benelux series So You Think You Can Dance. On October 5, 2011, DeLuna performed "Push Push" for Latina magazine's 15th-anniversary at the Globe Theatre in Los Angeles.

== Track listings ==
Digital download

1. "Push Push" - 3:09

CD Single

1. "Push Push" - 3:10
2. "Push Push (Spanish Version)" - 3:15

Push Push Remixes

1. "Push Push Remix (Radio Edit)" - 3:38
2. "Push Push Remix (Electro Club Mix)" - 5:14

== Credits and personnel ==
Credits adapted from "Inside Out" CD album liner notes and Apple Music.

- Kat DeLuna – vocals
- Akon – vocals
- K. DeLuna – writer
- Tiwa Savage – writer
- T. Johnson – writer
- N. Atweh – writer
- A. Thiam – writer
- G. Tuinfort – writer
- Radio – producer, recording engineer
- Vlado Mellor – mastering engineer
- Jaycen Joshua – mixing engineer
- Mark "Exit" Goodchild – assistant recording engineer
- Pulse recording – recording location

== Charts ==
=== Weekly charts ===
Chart (2010)	Peak position
Belgium (Ultratop 50 Flanders)	15
Belgium (Ultratop 50 Wallonia)	25
Canada Hot 100 (Billboard)	84
France (SNEP)	9

=== Year-end charts ===
Chart (2010)	Position
Belgium (Ultratop Flanders)	82

Chart (2011)	Position
France (SNEP)	99

== Release history ==
Region	Date
United States (Spanish version)	April 13, 2010
United States	April 16, 2010
France	November 2, 2010
