= Bum Bum =

2015 single by Kat Deluna featuring Trey Songz

Single by Kat DeLuna featuring Trey Songz

from the album Loading
- Released: March 30, 2015
- Length: 3:04
- Label: eOne
- Songwriters: Tremaine Neverson; Sam Hook; Shaun Pizzonia; Braun Thompson; Orville Burrell; Ricardo Ducent; Ophlin Russell-Myers

Kat DeLuna singles chronology
"Wanna See U Dance (La La La)" (2012)	"Bum Bum" (2015)	"What a Night" (2016)

Trey Songz singles chronology
"Slow Motion" (2015)	"Bum Bum" (2015)

"Bum Bum" is a song by American singer Kat DeLuna featuring Trey Songz, released by eOne as a standalone single on March 30, 2015. A dance song, it samples and interpolates Sister Nancy's "Bam Bam" (1982) and Shaggy and Rikrok's "It Wasn't Me" (2000). The instrumental has reggae influences and the lyrics are about sex. The song was included on DeLuna's compilation album Loading (2016). Critics had a mixed response to "Bum Bum", which peaked at number 32 on the Rhythmic Billboard chart. The song was promoted with a music video released on June 16, 2015. In it, DeLuna dances and appears nude. Noise Cans and Frank Delour released remixes for the single.

== Composition and lyrics ==
"Bum Bum" was written by Thomas Allen, Harold Brown, Orville Burrell, Morris "B.B." Dickerson, Rickardo Ducent, Leroy Jordan, Charles Miller, Lee Oskar, Shaun Pizzonia, Winston Delano Riley, Howard Scott, and Brian Thompson. A Vibe writer described it as a dance song with reggae influences and "island vibes". Mike Wass of Idolator called it a slow jam and contrasted its "soft and mellow" sound with DeLuna's past music, which was frequently uptempo club music.

"Bum Bum" samples and interpolates of Sister Nancy's 1982 song "Bam Bam" and Shaggy and Rikrok's 2000 single "It Wasn't Me". DeLuna said that Hook chose the samples. As part of a press release, she described the sample as "evidence that music transcends generations" and said "Bam Bam" had "left [a] musical imprint culturally". The Fader's Rawiya Kameir cited "Bum Bum" as a possible indicator of dancehall's resurgence in mainstream media.

Throughout the song, DeLuna gives instructions to a lover, such as: "We can do it in the shower / We can do it on the floor / You can get it every hour, there's so much more." She teases her partner: "Go hard but don’t break it". Trey Songz's verses include "Shawty came in and she caught me red handed staring at her butt"; Kameir said he acts like a "charming lothario". According to HotNewHipHop's Trevor Smith, "Bum Bum" was one of several singles about butts released in 2015.

== Release ==
"Bum Bum" was uploaded to DeLuna's YouTube channel on March 30, 2015. The same day, it was released only as a digital download on iTunes and DeLuna's official website. The song was included on the compilation album Loading (2016). Wass considered "Bum Bum" to be DeLuna's return to US radio after primarily promoting her music in Europe. On May 20, 2015, Caribbean producer Noise Cans uploaded a remix on his SoundCloud account; it replaces the samples with a different instrumental. Producer Frank Delour also released a remix, featuring a faster tempo and a "more sunny and tropical" sound.

DeLuna said the cover art was inspired by Roman and Greek statues of nude women and Helmut Newton's photography of nude figures. She connected the artwork with women's empowerment, saying that she wanted to "bring the essence of empowering women". She said: "It's empowering to have your body be a piece of art rather than a sex symbol. I want women to know that their flesh and soul are a symbol of power and beauty."

== Reception ==
"Bum Bum" received mixed responses from critics. Wass praised it as "a hip-dipping slow jam that celebrates women and makes you want to move". Criticizing the title as "juvenile" and the song for having an "overarching silliness", Smith commended DeLuna and Songz for "hold[ing] down the reggae-tinged record with winking glee". AllMusic's Andy Kellman dismissed "Bum Bum" as "boilerplate reggae-pop fusion".

Commercially, "Bum Bum" reached number 32 on the Rhythmic Billboard chart on June 27, 2015. It remained on the chart for five weeks.

== Music video ==
The music video was uploaded to DeLuna's YouTube channel on June 16, 2015. Throughout it, DeLuna "shakes, winds, jiggles, pats, rubs, pops, and drops her butt"; Songz is not included in the video. DeLuna appears nude in certain scenes; she said it was a commentary on power and not intended to be purely sexual. Kameir believed the video would get a continuation due to a "mysterious title screen" at the end. Wass described the video as "eye-popping" and one of the most "outrageous" released in 2015, and Kameir said that it "proves that subtlety is passé".

== Charts ==
Chart (2015)	Peak position
US Rhythmic Airplay (Billboard)	32
