= Wanna See U Dance (La La La) =

Single by Kat DeLuna

from the album Loading
- Released: July 11, 2012
- Recorded: 2012
- Genre: Dance
- Length: 3:07 (original version); 3:28 (video version)
- Label: eOne; Mass Appeal Entertainment; ARS Entertainment Belgium; Manhattan Recordings; Universal Music
- Songwriters: Kat DeLuna; Kalenna Harper; Robin Henriquez
- Producers: Lynx; Tyrone Edmond

Kat DeLuna singles chronology
"Drop It Low" (2011)	"Wanna See U Dance (La La La)" (2012)	"Sobredosis" (2012)

"Wanna See U Dance (La La La)" is a song by American singer Kat DeLuna. It was released on July 11, 2012, in Japan and elsewhere on August 23, 2012. It was originally recorded to appear on DeLuna's planned third studio album, "Viva Out Loud", as the project's first single. It was eventually featured on her 2016 compilation album "Loading". It was written by DeLuna, Kalenna Harper and Robin Henriquez and was produced by Lynx and Tyrone Edmond. The song contains a sample of "Tombo in 7/4" by Brazilian singer Airto Moreira. The song incorporates DeLuna's often used Latin pop sound mixed with dub step and Brazilian-esque themes.

A music video for the song was filmed and premiered on August 24, 2012. It features DeLuna performing Samba style dance routines in a rain forest setting, attempting to seduce a potential lover. DeLuna had to learn how to dance the samba in preparation for the video shoot. The song was re-released on May 28, 2014, under the title "Wanna See U Dance 2014" in Japan. It formed part of a digital EP and CD single that contained additional remixes of the song. The song charted in Belgium and France.

== Background and production ==
"Wanna See U Dance (La La La)" was originally recorded for DeLuna's planned third studio album titled "Viva Out Loud", which was intended to be her sophomore US album. The song was marketed as the first official single for the album. "Viva Out Loud" was supposed to be released in late 2012 or early 2013. Of the album's title and contents, DeLuna explained to Joycelyn Rubin from RyanSeacrest.com "that's how I live. You have to live loud. It’s amazing. It's very musical because it has new sounds. I have ballads, but infused with crazy dub step. And then again, I’m giving you guys the hard core pop, Latin, dance infused dance songs, but with something new."

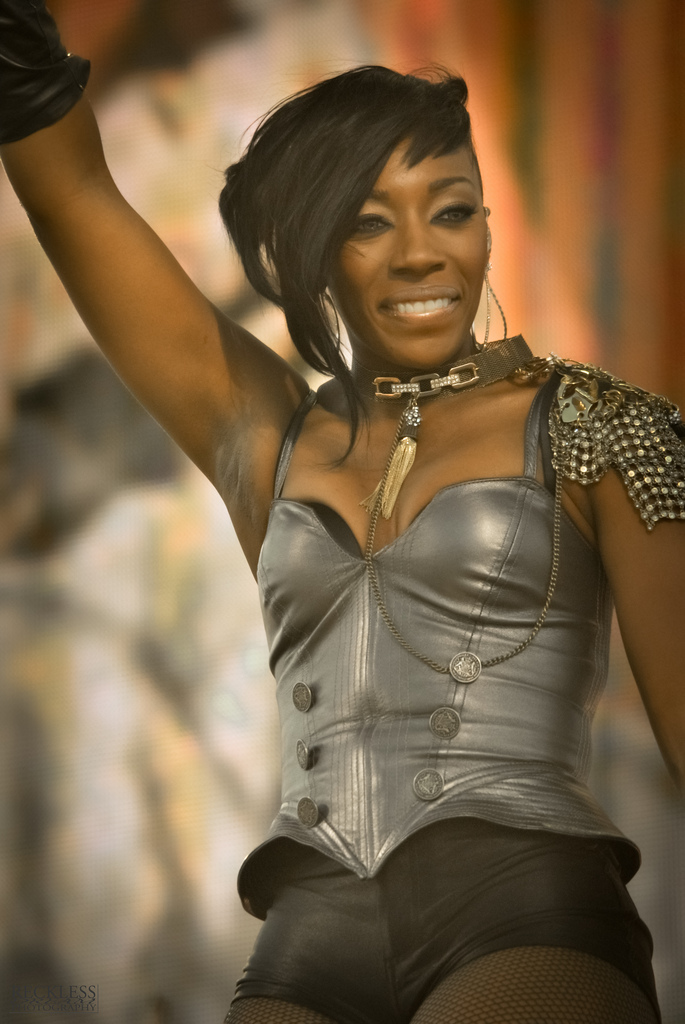
Kalenna Harper (pictured) co-wrote "Wanna See U Dance (La La La)" with Robin Henriquez and Kat DeLuna.

"Wanna See U Dance (La La La)" was written by DeLuna, Kalenna Harper and Robin Henriquez. It was produced by Lynx and Tyrone Edmond. DeLuna co-wrote the song with one of her best friends. She stated that international music inspired her during the creative process, but the song still retained her trademark sound of "Latin infused with pop". The track's bridge incorporates elements of dub step. DeLuna described it as a "new form of dub step" inspired by British music releases from that time. She added that "Wanna See U Dance (La La La)" also has "a little bit of Brazilian-esque music" as its influence. The song also has elements of modern samba sounds, pop music and euphoric dance hooks.

The song contains a sample of "Tombo in 7/4" by Brazilian singer Airto Moreira. Universal Music revealed in a press release that DeLuna purposely included the sample following its sampled success in the song "Samba de Janeiro" by the German group Bellini. Describing the song, DeLuna stated "I live my life loud and direct: my music is meant to motivate people, inspire them and ultimately serve as the soundtrack to their lives. This song is clearly a call for everyone to finally get on the dance floor."

The song was first released in Japan on July 11, 2012, via Manhattan Recordings. It was released in the US on August 23, 2012, via Entertainment One Music and Mass Appeal Entertainment. The song was eventually featured on both the US and Japanese editions of DeLuna's compilation album, "Loading", in 2016.

The song was re-released on May 28, 2014, under the title "Wanna See U Dance 2014", exclusively to the Japanese market as a digital download EP and also received a physical CD release. It contained new remixes of the song and received a promotional trailer in Japan. The EP included remixes from Australian DJ Kronic and Japanese artist DJ FUMI★YEAH!.

== Music video ==
The music video for "Wanna See U Dance (La La La)" premiered on August 24, 2012, on Ryanseacrest.com. It was also added to DeLuna's Vevo channel. A writer for the official German Universal Music Group website stated that the video fitted the dance pop sound that "Wanna See U Dance (La La La)" has. It was directed by Edmond. The video features DeLuna performing dance routines in a rain forest setting. She tries to win the affections of a male featured in the video. DeLuna is styled with a short blonde bob hairstyle and performs various dance routines, with one culminating routine in a rain scene. Of the male model featured, DeLuna stated "you have to see the guy in my music video, he's so hot!"

To prepare for the video's choreography, DeLuna learned how to perform samba dance routines. She recalled that she was under pressure not to fall over, performing a samba on a wet floor. The video also features a love scene, which was a first in her music videography. She told Rubin that "I thanked God that the water was cold because the guy was hot. He looked like Leonardo DiCaprio. He's like a hot top model, so that was fun."

== Critical reception ==
Andrew Martin from Complex believed the song's accompanying music video made it "likely that the love will keep on coming" for the song. He described her a getting "a lil' wild in a rain forest". The song was selected as the "pick of the week" track for KIIS FM 102.7's "Just Jared Music Monday", where it was branded a "hot new song". Emily Laurence writing for Seventeen described "Wanna See U Dance (La La La)" as "a must for a party playlist" because "it really makes you want to dance". She branded the accompanying visuals a "super hot new music video" and labelled DeLuna as "a crazy talented dancer" who "doesn't hold back" in the video.

Rubin, from RyanSeacreast.com described the song as a natural successor to her debut single, "Whine Up". She believed it had the potential to return her to the top of the Billboard dance/club song chart. Nadine Cheung from KKLS-FM described the video as a "steamy clip", "sexy" and noted DeLuna looked "so hot" in it as she "naturally" demonstrates her dance skills.

== Track listing and formats ==
- Digital download
1. "Wanna See U Dance (La La La)" – 3:07
- Japan Digital EP
1. "Wanna See U Dance 2014" (DJ FUMI★YEAH! version) – 5:12
2. "Wanna See U Dance 2014" (Kronic version) – 4:05
3. "Wanna See U Dance 2014" (DJ Ryo version) – 5:43
4. "Wanna See U Dance (La La La)" [Original version] – 3:10
- Japan CD
1. "Wanna See U Dance 2014" (Kronic version) – 4:07
2. "Wanna See U Dance 2014" (DJ FUMI★YEAH! version) – 5:14
3. "Wanna See U Dance 2014" (DJ Ryo version) – 5:45
4. "Wanna See U Dance (La La La)" [Original version] – 3:12
5. "Wanna See U Dance (La La La)" [Original instrumental] – 3:10

== Credits and personnel ==
Credits adapted from "Loading" CD single liner notes.

- Kat DeLuna - vocals
- Kathleen DeLuna – writer
- Kalenna Harper – writer
- Robin Henriquez – writer
- Airto Moreira – writer
- Lynx – producer
- Tyrone Edmond – writer, producer
- James Zaner – recorder
- Blue Jay Studio – mixing location

== Charts ==
Chart (2012)	Peak position
Belgium (Ultratop 50 Flanders)	15
Belgium (Ultratop 50 Wallonia)	4
Bulgaria (BAMP)	18
France (SNEP)	188

== Release history ==
Country	Release date	Format
Japan	July 11, 2012	Digital download
US	August 23, 2012	Digital download
Belgium	August 23, 2012	Digital download
France	August 23, 2012	Digital download
Germany	October 19, 2012	Digital download
Japan	May 28, 2014	Digital EP, CD single
