= Dancing Tonight =

Single by Kat DeLuna featuring Fo Onassis

from the album Inside Out
- Released: February 22, 2011
- Recorded: 2011
- Genre: Dance-pop; Europop
- Length: 3:40
- Label: Universal Motown
- Songwriters: Sebastian LaMar Jones; Dallas Diamond; Andras Vleminckx
- Producers: Andras Vleminckx; Deekly

Kat DeLuna singles chronology
"Party O'Clock" (2010)	"Dancing Tonight" (2011)	"Drop it Low" (2011)

"Dancing Tonight" is a single by American singer Kat DeLuna, the fourth single from her second studio album Inside Out. The original title of the song was in fact "We'll Be Dancing", with the original top-line conceptualized and written by Sebastian La'Mar Jones. Jones then brought aboard Dallas Diamond, a then college student and friend enrolled at Full Sail University, to help finish the record. "Dancing Tonight" was produced by EightySix.

== Background ==
DeLuna released the song digitally in the US on March 22, 2011. It reached number one on the US Dance Club Songs chart in May 2011. In the "Dancing Tonight" music video, DeLuna is stylised with custom made eye patches that she wears as a head accessory.

== Track listings ==
Digital download

1. "Dancing Tonight" - 3:25

Promo CD

1. "Dancing Tonight" - 3:25
2. "Bailando" - 3:25
3. "Dancing Tonight" (86 & Soundset Remix) - 4:15
4. "Bailando" (86 & Soundset Remix) - 4:30

Dancing Tonight (iTunes Remixes)

1. "Dancing Tonight" (Radio Edit) - 3:23
2. "Dancing Tonight (feat. Fo Onassis)" (Main) - 3:22
3. "Bailando" (Radio Edit) - 4:21
4. "Dancing Tonight" (Richard Bahericz & Claude Njoya Electro Club Remix) - 5:21
5. "Dancing Tonight" (Latin Mix byEffect-O) - 3:36
6. "Bailando" (Effect-O Latin Mix) - 3:36

Dancing Tonight (Ralphi Rosario Remixes) - EP

1. "Dancing Tonight" (Ralphi Rosario Radio Edit) - 3:36
2. "Dancing Tonight" (Ralphi Rosario Club Mix) - 6:58
3. "Dancing Tonight" (Bugout & Carcione Remix) - 7:40
4. "Bailando" (Ralphi Rosario Club Mix) - 6:34

== Charts ==
Chart (2011)	Peak position
Belgium (Ultratip Bubbling Under Wallonia)	15
US Dance Club Songs (Billboard)	1
Billboard Global Dance Songs	24

=== End of year charts ===
Year	Country	Chart	Ranking
2011	U.S.	U.S. Billboard Hot Dance Club Songs	1

== See also ==
- List of number-one dance singles of 2011 (U.S.)
