= Drop It Low (Kat DeLuna song) =

Single by Kat DeLuna

from the album Inside Out
- Released: May 10, 2011
- Recorded: 2011
- Genre: House; reggaeton; dance-pop
- Length: 3:50
- Label: Universal Motown
- Songwriter(s): Kat DeLuna; Tyrone Edmond; Andras Vleminckx
- Producer(s): Andras Vleminckx

Kat DeLuna singles chronology
"Dancing Tonight" (2011)	"Drop It Low" (2011)	"Wanna See U Dance (La La La)" (2012)

"Drop It Low" is a song by American singer Kat DeLuna. It was released as the fifth single from her second studio album Inside Out. It was featured in the Zumba Fitness Core video game.

== Music video ==
The video is set in an intimidating room surrounded by a chain link fence. At first it feels like a Gladiator-style environment, with large groups of people sizing each other up, but it turns out they’re all here for an informal dance battle.

As DeLuna sings, “Shake your booty, make it pow, pow, pow / Turn around, keep it coming for more-a,” she does exactly that, showing off her assets in Daisy Dukes and a tight red swimsuit. She also leads a group of dancers in a black and white dance sequence that looks like a homage to Beyoncé.

At different points in the five-minute clip, DeLuna sports an American flag sarong, a sequin dress, leather pants, a red motorcycle helmet and a colorful, tropical-looking button-down shirt.

When DeLuna gets her turn in the center of the floor, ‘Drop It Low’ is replaced by more fast-paced Latin music. Then back comes the familiar sound of ‘Drop It Low,’ and the dancing resumes. It looks like the party might go all night, and the video fades out with the words, “To be continued in São Paulo.”

== Track listings ==
Digital download

1. "Drop It Low" - 3:46

Drop It Low - EP

1. "Drop It Low" (Main Mix)- 3:46
2. "Drop It Low" (Fatman Scoop Remix) - 3:42
3. "Drop It Low" (Jumpsmokers Remix) - 4:17
4. "Drop It Low" (Disco Fries Remix) - 6:11

Drop It Low (feat. Fatman Scoop)

1. "Drop It Low" (Radio Edit) - 3:39
2. "Drop It Low" (Club Version) - 3:39
3. "Drop It Low" (Richard Bahericz & Claude-Njoya) - 4:46

Drop It Low (Amazon Remixes)

1. "Drop It Low" (Radio Edit)- 3:46
2. "Drop It Low" (Fatman Scoop Mix) - 3:46
3. "Drop It Low" (Jump Smokers Remix) - 4:17
4. "Drop It Low" (Disco Fries Remix) - 3:36

== Charts ==
=== Weekly charts ===
Chart (2011)	Peak position
Belgium (Ultratop 50 Flanders)	12
Belgium Dance (Ultratop Flanders)	16
Belgium (Ultratop 50 Wallonia)	7
Belgium Dance (Ultratop Wallonia)	25

=== Year-end charts ===
Charts (2011)	Position
Belgium (Ultratop 50 Flanders)	85
Belgium (Ultratop 50 Wallonia)	95
