= Lanz Pierce =

American singer (born 1989)

- Born: Alana Michelle Josephs; November 23, 1989 (age 36); Forest Hills, New York
- Genres: Hip hop
- Occupations: Rapper, Singer
- Years active: 2004–present
- Labels: Innovators & Aviators
- Website: http://lanzpierce.com

Alana Michelle Josephs (born November 23, 1989), better known under her stage name Lanz Pierce, is an American rapper, singer, songwriter and recording artist. She was born in Queens, New York and raised in New Jersey.

== Early life ==
Born in Queens, New York to parents Andrea Josephs, an insurance broker, and Michael Josephs, an attorney, her path towards hip-hop was shaped by her parents' acrimonious divorce when she was six years old. At age 11, she began composing rhymes, influenced by male role models in the industry such as Tupac Shakur, Eminem, DMX, and Nas. Her female influences include Missy Elliott and Lil Kim. Pierce dropped out of school at age 14 and fought for recognition on stage through the underground hip-hop scene. In 2003, Pierce called Quad Studios in Midtown Manhattan numerous times, eventually appearing at its office in person. After impressing the manager with her rhymes, she received an internship but remained an unsigned artist.

== Career ==
In February 2006, Pierce signed with Interscope, following an acclaimed performance in Chicago at Lollapalooza on the BMI showcase stage. As a songwriter, she contributed to the works of Three 6 Mafia, Focus, Stargate, JR Rotem, Organized Noize, Emile and Syience.

In March 2013, Pierce released first independent EP released her first album, Point of No Return on her own independent label, Innovators&Aviators, which was distributed by Empire.

== Discography ==
Albums

- Los City (2017)
- Editors Eye (2015)

Eps

- Point of No Return (2013)
