= Sobredosis (Kat DeLuna song) =

Single by Kat DeLuna featuring El Cata

from the album Loading
- Language: Spanish
- Released: September 4, 2012
- Genre: Latin pop
- Length: 3:47
- Label: eOne, Global Music Brand, Mass Appeal Entertainment
- Songwriters: Kat DeLuna, Richie Pena, El Cata
- Producers: El Cata; Richie Pena; Polo Para

Kat DeLuna featuring El Cata singles chronology
"Wanna See U Dance (La La La)" (2012)	"Sobredosis" (2012)	"Wild Girl" (2012)

"Sobredosis" (transl. "Overdose") is a song by American singer Kat DeLuna. It was released on September 4, 2012, in the US and elsewhere on September 26, 2012. "Sobredosis" is a Spanish language song and it features the Dominican singer, El Cata. It was originally recorded to appear on DeLuna's planned third studio album, "Viva Out Loud" and was marketed as a single from the project. It was eventually featured on her 2016 compilation album "Loading". It was written by DeLuna, Richie Pena and El Cata and was produced by Pena, El Cata and Polo Para. Commercially, the song charted on the US Billboard Tropical Airplay and Latin Digital Song Sales charts.

== Background and production ==
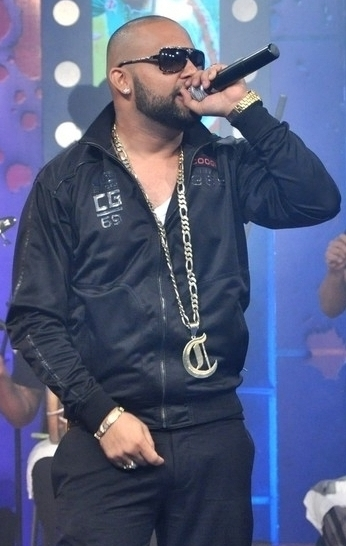
Featured artist, El Cata who also co-wrote and produced "Sobredosis".

"Sobredosis" is a Spanish language song and it features the Dominican singer, El Cata. The song title, "Sobredosis" translates to "Overdose" in English. "Sobredosis" was written by Kat DeLuna, Richie Pena and El Cata and was produced by Pena, El Cata and Polo Para. It was recorded at the Blue Jay Studio in Florida. DeLuna premiered the song via her YouTube channel on July 11, 2012. It was first released commercially in the US on September 4, 2012 via the eOne, Global Music Brand and Mass Appeal Entertainment record labels.

"Viva Out Loud" was planned to be her sophomore release in the US, which DeLuna viewed as "a long time coming". She told a reporter from Adelante Magazine that she worked hard on the album and described it as "a musical experience the same as a growth experience."

By October 2014, DeLuna indicated via her official website that she still planned to release "Viva Out Loud". "Sobredosis" was eventually featured on the International version DeLuna's 2016 compilation album, "Loading" but it was not included on the Japanese album release.

== Critical reception ==
Madeleine Smither from The Monitor assessed that DeLuna releasing "Sobredosis" "broadened her repertoire". In October 2016, "Sobredosis" was featured in the Cuban show "Que suene la música" and was voted number one in the show.

== Commercial performance ==
DeLuna's previous singles from the planned album failed to chart it in the US. Though "Sobredosis" debuted on the US Tropical Airplay (Billboard) chart on October 6, 2012. It peaked at number thirty-two on the week commencing October 10, 2012 and spent four weeks on the chart. "Sobredosis" also debuted and peaked at number eleven on the US Latin Digital Song Sales (Billboard) on the week commencing October 13, 2012 and spent a total of three weeks on the chart.

== Live performances ==
DeLuna performed "Sobredosis" at San Jose Pride on August 19, 2012.

== Track listing and formats ==
- Digital download
1. "Sobredosis" – 3:47

== Credits and personnel ==
Credits adapted from "Loading" CD album liner notes.

- Kat DeLuna - vocals
- Kathleen DeLuna – writer
- El Cata - producer, writer
- Richie Pena - producer, writer
- Polo Para - producer, mixer
- James Zaner – recorder
- Blue Jay Studio – mixing location

== Charts ==
Chart (2012)	Peak position
US Tropical Airplay (Billboard)	32
US Latin Digital Song Sales (Billboard)	11

== Release history ==
Country	Release date	Format
US	September 4, 2012	Digital download
Argentina	September 26, 2012	Digital download
Asia	September 26, 2012	Digital download
