= Djibril Gibson Kagni =

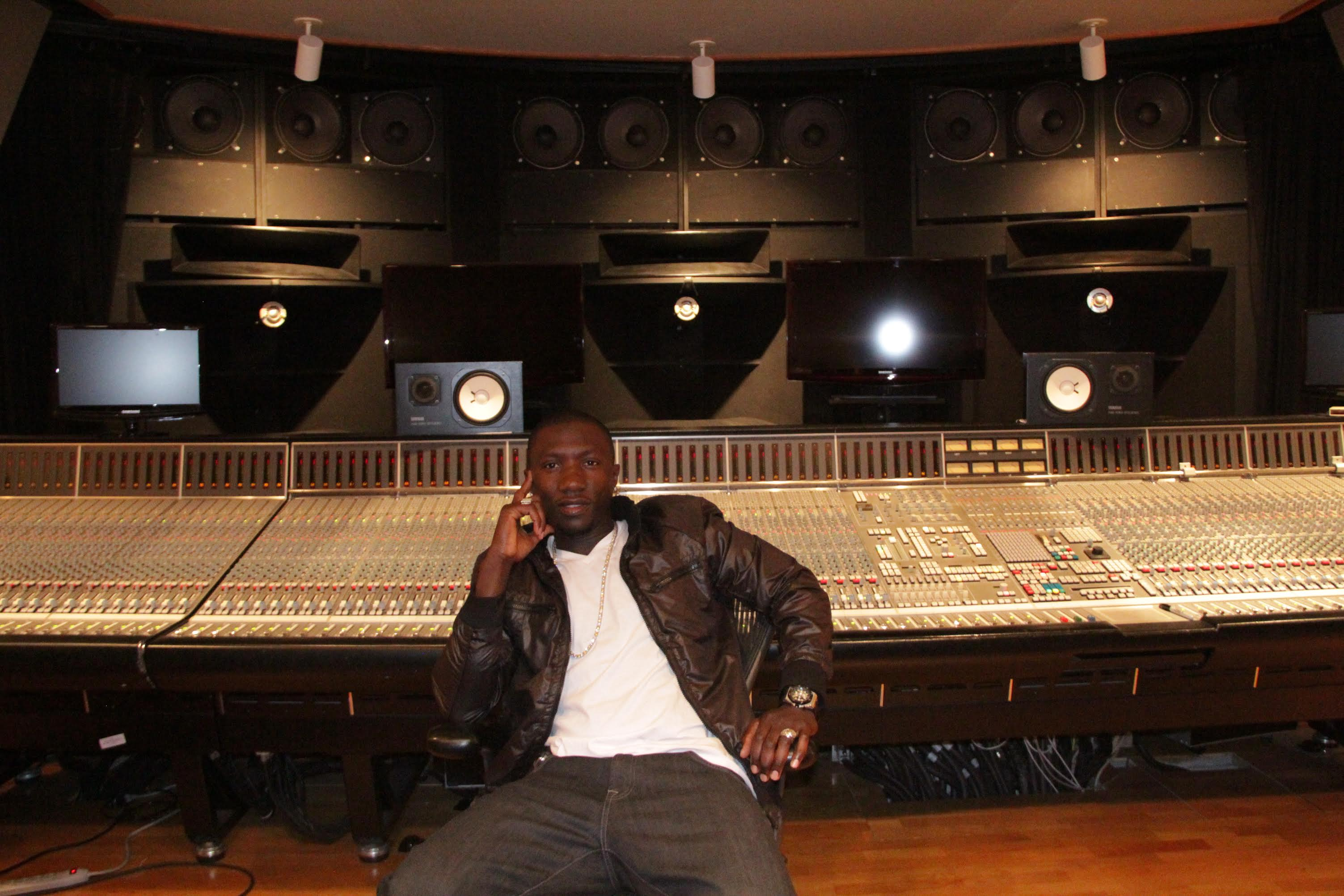
- Kagni at a 2014 recording session

Background information
- Born: Djibril Gibson Kagni; October 13, 1977 (age 48); Dakar, Senegal
- Genres: house; hip hop; Pop; R&B
- Occupations: Record producer, songwriter
- Years active: 2004–present
- Labels: Konvict Muzik; Universal Music Group; G production

Djibril Gibson Kagni (born October 13, 1977) is a record producer and songwriter. Gibson's first full credit production work was in 2004 on Trouble (Akon album) for American rapper Akon.

In 2007, Gibson started working with Russian artist Timati. Timati was already a popular face in Russia, but not internationally. Gibson and Timati made the hit "Welcome to St. Tropez" together.

== Early life ==
Gibson graduated from Howard University. Then he decided to join his cousin, Akon, on the Konvict Muzik label.

== Music career ==
=== 2004–2005 ===
Trouble Gibson has worked closely with Akon from the beginning of Akon's career in 2004 and has been a member of Konvict Muzik.

=== 2006–2008 ===
Konvicted Gibson's work on Akon's album Konvicted was success

=== 2008–2009 ===
Freedom Gibson's production on the album began in May 2008 and ended in late of the same year. It was released as a download on December 1, 2008, and in stores December 2, 2008. The album debuted at number 7 on the Billboard 200 with 110,600 copies sold in its first week.

== List of Gibson's work on studio albums for Timati ==
- The Boss (2009)
- SWAGG (2012)
- 13 (2013)
- Audiokapsula (2014)
- Olimp (2016)

== G Production ==
After Gibson's first tour he did in 2004 with Akon's first album, Trouble. Later he created G-Production Muzik Group.

=== Gibson's production ===
List of singles as Gibson produced for Timati, with selected chart positions and certifications, showing year released and album name
Year	Title	Peak chart positions							Certifications	Album
Year	Title	AUT	BEL	FRA	GER	NED	SPA	SWI	Certifications	Album
"Groove On" (featuring Snoop Dogg)	2009	–	21	–	62	88	—	—		The Boss
"Welcome to St. Tropez" (featuring Blue Marine)	2010	–	–	–	–	–	–	45		The Boss
"Welcome to St. Tropez" (DJ Antoine vs. Timati featuring Kalenna)	2011	4	9	7	3	7	16	2	IFPI SWI: 3× Platinum; BVMI: Platinum	2011
"I'm on You" (featuring P. Diddy, Dirty Money and DJ Antoine)	2012	–	–	–	50	–	–	62		SWAGG
"Not All About The Money" (with La La Land featuring Timbaland and Grooya)	2012	32	–	–	29	–	–	7		SWAGG
"Sex in the Bathroom" (featuring Craig David)	2012	–	—	—	—	—	—	—		SWAGG

== Production work for recording artists ==
Gibson work with many A-list artists and here is production work that Gibson did:

- Timati - Ключи от рая (The keys to paradise / Kljuchi ot raja) 2016 (produced by Gibson Kagni)
- Timati feat Egor Kreed - Где ты, где я (Where are you, where am I) 2016 (produced by Gibson Kagni)
- Timati feat Keti Topuria - Маленький принц (A little prince / Malen'kij princ) 2016 (produced by Gibson Kagni)
- Timati - О последней любви на земле (About the last love on Earth / O poslednej ljubvi na zemle) 2016 (produced by Gibson Kagni)
- Timati - Давай (Come on / Davaj) 2016 (produced by Gibson Kagni)
- Timati - Новая русская мечта (New Russian dream / Novaja russkaja mechta) 2016 (produced by Gibson Kagni)
- Hardwell feat Jason Derulo - "Follow Me" from album United We Are 2015 (produced by Gibson Kagni)
- Pitbull - "Drive you crazy" from album Globalization 2014 (produced by Gibson Kagni)
- The Game - " Gangsta party " (produced by Gibson Kagni)
- Booba - "King" (produced by Gibson Kagni)
- Booba - "Salads tomate ognion" (produced by Gibson Kagni)
- Winter Gordon - "All my life " (produced by Gibson Kagni)
- School Gylrs - "Something like a party" (produced by Gibson Kagni)
- Timati feat P Diddy – "I’m on you" (produced by Gibson Kagni)
- Timati feat Busta Rhymes – "Love you" (produced by Gibson Kagni)
- Timati feat Snoop Dogg – "Groove On" (produced by Gibson Kagni)
- Timati feat Eve – "Money in the bank" (produced by Gibson Kagni)
- Shontelle - " Love shop" (produced by Gibson Kagni)
- Ja Rule - " To the top" (produced by Gibson Kagni)
