= Sebastian LaMar Jones =

American record producer, songwriter, DJ

Sebastian La'Mar Jones
- Born: October 22, 1986 (age 39); St. Louis, Missouri, United States
- Genres: Dance, pop, country, hip-hop
- Occupations: DJ, songwriter, record producer
- Years active: 2009–present
- Labels: Basement Club Sound, Sound Label Group

Sebastian La'Mar Jones (born October 22, 1986), also known simply as Sebastian Jones, is an American record producer, songwriter and DJ. Born in St. Louis, Missouri, United States his credits include charting at No. 1 on the Billboard Dance/Hot Club Play Chart in the United States, Belgium and Japan in 2011.

== Songwriting and production ==
In 2010 Sebastian began writing several records for Kat DeLuna's second album Inside Out. He scored his debut on the Billboard charts, with her second single, "Dancing Tonight" as the No. 35 Hot Shot Debut and the No. 1 Breakout Record on the Dance/Club Play Chart in 2011. Famed producer RedOne executive produced the album and it was released via Universal Music Group. "Dancing Tonight" later became the No. 1 Billboard Dance record in the United States and landed at No. 36 on the 2011 Billboard Year End Dance Chart edging more popular tunes by superstars Beyoncé, Britney Spears and Lady Gaga. The music video charted on Yahoo Music at No. 8. Sebastian has gone on to write and produce songs that have appeared on networks such as NBC, ABC, FOX, MTV and Telemundo appearing on shows such as Dancing With the Stars, The Firm, So You Think You Can Dance and La Voz Kids.

== Discography ==
Year	Artist	Album	Track	Charting	Credit
2011	Kat DeLuna	Inside Out, iTunes Remixes, Ralphi Rosario Remixes, Le Son Dancefloor 2011- Vol.2, Lato Bravo Hits	Dancing Tonight featuring Fo Onassis	No. 1 US Billboard Dance Chart, No. 1 Japan R&B Chart, No. 15 Belgian Singles Chart	Co-Writer
2011	Kat DeLuna	Viva Out Loud	Drop It Low	No. 27 US Billboard Dance Chart	Co-Writer
2011	Kat DeLuna	Dancing Tonight EP	Bailando		Co-Writer
2012	Jash	Non-Album Single	If Only (feat. Sebastian Jones)		Co-Producer
