= Unstoppable (Kat DeLuna song) =

Single by Kat DeLuna featuring Lil Wayne

from the album Inside Out and Confessions of a Shopaholic soundtrack
- Released: January 22, 2009
- Recorded: 2008
- Genre: Electropop; dance-rock; hip hop
- Length: 3:49
- Label: Universal Motown; Konvict Muzik
- Songwriters: Nadir Khayat; Dwayne Carter, Jr.; Kinda "Kee" Hamid
- Producer: RedOne

Kat DeLuna singles chronology
"In the End" (2008)	"Unstoppable" (2009)	"Push Push" (2010)

"Unstoppable" is a single by American singer Kat DeLuna which was included on her sophomore studio album, "Inside Out" and featured on the soundtrack to the 2009 film, Confessions of a Shopaholic. It was released on January 22, 2009 via Universal Motown and Konvict Muzik. It was released to American radio stations on March 24, 2009. The single version features rapper Lil Wayne. The single has been featured in frequent WNBA commercials. "Unstoppable" was produced by RedOne, who worked with DeLuna on her debut studio album, 9 Lives.

== Background ==
"Unstoppable" was released as a single following the announcement of DeLuna's sophomore studio album, "Inside Out". "Unstoppable" was produced by RedOne, who worked with DeLuna on her debut studio album, 9 Lives. The song includes the use of auto-tune on DeLuna's vocals and incorporates a guitar in the instrumental. The song is a departure from the musical style DeLuna explored on her debut album. DeLuna explained that "it's more of an anthem. It's just about making a statement. I'm not really trying to sing in it, it's just to feel good, to say nothing can put a stop to you and your dreams. At the end of the day, that is who I really am." The official single release features the rapper, Lil Wayne. DeLuna chose to work with because of his commercial success at the time. DeLuna explained that she viewed Lil Wayne as "unstoppable" in the music industry at the time and believed he suited the record well. She enjoyed collaborating with him, branding him "humble" and "nice". She added "I knew that he would add a rock-star vibe to it. He just makes it." DeLuna revealed that "Unstoppable" would be different to the other songs she had recorded for "Inside Out" because they sound not "as auto-tune-ish".

"Unstoppable" was made available for radio airplay in February 2009. The song was released to mainstream American radio stations on March 24, 2009.

An alternate solo version of "Unstoppable" was also produced, which was included on the "Confessions of a Shopaholic soundtrack".

DeLuna performed the song live on the "gay tour", which toured US gay clubs in 2009.

== Music video ==
The music video for "Unstoppable" premiered on DeLuna's Myspace profile on January 23, 2009. The video features DeLuna styled with a new jet-black hairstyle. It includes scenes with DeLuna and Lil Wayne riding on a motorcycle.

== Critical reception ==
Joey Guerra from Houston Chronicle opined that "Unstoppable" was a reintroduction to DeLuna and a "departure" from her previous releases. He assessed that she "put a decidedly darker spin on things" with the song. He likened "Unstoppable" to the song, "Disturbia" by Barbadian singer, Rihanna. Guerra believed the song was helped by using "music's current kingpin" Lil Wayne.

== Charts ==
Chart (2009)	Peak position
Bulgaria (BAMP)	8
Canada Hot 100 (Billboard)	80
