= Party O'Clock (Kat DeLuna song) =

Single by Kat DeLuna

from the album Inside Out
- Released: November 5, 2010
- Genre: Electropop; dance-pop; R&B
- Length: 3:34
- Label: Universal Motown
- Songwriters: Nadir Khayat; Bilal Hajji; Kat DeLuna; Kee Hamid
- Producer: RedOne

Kat DeLuna singles chronology
"Push Push" (2010)	"Party O'Clock" (2010)	"Dancing Tonight" (2011)

"Party O'Clock" is a single by American singer Kat DeLuna. It is the third single from her second studio album Inside Out.

== Live performances ==
November 7, 2010, DeLuna performed a megamix of "Party O'Clock" and her previous single, "Push Push" on the Benelux series So You Think You Can Dance.

== Controversies ==
Shortly after Jennifer Lopez released her single "On the Floor" on February 22, 2011, many of DeLuna's fans, as well as critics, claimed that "On the Floor" plagiarised DeLuna's 2010 single "Party O'Clock". In a statement issued to the New York Daily News, DeLuna said "It's cool that artists like J.Lo are inspired by my musical sound and style. ... Jennifer helped pave the way for Latinas like myself. I love her", and insisted that there was not an issue.

Following previews of the music video for "On the Floor," DeLuna changed her mind about how she felt with the claims of copying. In another interview with the New York Daily News, several days after the first, she said "I've seen this before, where the more established artist tries to take the vision and artistic ideas away from an emerging artist, and assumes no one will notice because of their bigger shadow,... Luckily, my loyal fans and the power of the Internet have let the 'Kat' out of the bag". DeLuna had previously said she was inspired by Lopez, and saw her as someone who opened doors for people like her to sing.

When Lopez was asked about the issue on the Latin-American entertainment program Despierta America, she replied, "What? Really? I'm not aware of that...," and when asked a second time, she insisted she had not heard about the comparisons. It was alleged that "J.Lo's camp specifically requested that nothing about the Deluna debacle be brought up during the interview."

Both the DeLuna and Lopez singles were produced and co-written by RedOne.

== Music video ==
The music video was shot in Paris, France at the VIP Room Theatre on November 16, 2010. The first snippet Kat showed was on 10 November 2010. The snippet highlights her dance scene with four backing dancers. In one scene, she is snapped dressing up ala "Bollywood" and doing belly dancing of some kind. In another she opts for a red dress and struts her stuff in front of a giant clock. There are also images of her stripping down to nothing but a tight bustier, black panties and fishnet stockings.

The director of music video is a Jake Realisatur. The video premiered on YouTube channel on December 15, 2010.

== Track listings ==
Digital download

1. "Party O'Clock" - 3:34

CD Single Belgium

1. "Party O'Clock" - 3:34
2. "Party O'Clock" (Instrumental) - 3:35
3. "Party O'Clock" (Acapella) - 3:29

== Charts ==
Chart (2010)	Peak position
Belgium (Ultratop 50 Flanders)	17
Belgium (Ultratip Bubbling Under Wallonia)	4
European Single Chart	222
France (SNEP)	76
