= Tyrone Edmond =

Haitian-born model

- Born: Enoch Edmond; Cap-Haïtien, Haiti
- Occupations: Supermodel, CEO of GMB Records
- Years active: 1997-present

Tyrone Edmond (born Enoch Edmond in Cap-Haïtien, Haiti) is a Haitian-born model.

== Early life ==
In Haiti, Edmond lived a difficult childhood, struggling day-to-day in a highly impoverished situation in the shantytowns of Cap-Haïtien and Port-au-Prince, where he grew up. Early in his childhood, Tyrone attended a Seventh-day Adventist school of Carrefour in the capital. At the age of nine, Edmond's mother died resulting in him being adopted by an American missionary family and eventually emigrating to the United States at age fifteen.

== Modeling career ==
Edmond is one of the premier male models to gain international fame from the island country being compared with icons such as Tyson Beckford (whom he slightly resembles). The Haitian native's modeling career actually began through his encounter with Tommy Hilfiger in 1997. Ever since then, Edmond has become a feature model for fashion designer labels such as Ralph Lauren, Kenneth Cole, and Donna Karan.

== Name origin ==
Edmond's best friend, a young man named Tyrone (from whom Edmond adopted his name) who was afflicted with AIDS, died leading to Edmond's further involvement in socio-economic affairs and the fight in the AIDS/HIV epidemic.

== Music career ==
Also involved in the music industry, Edmond has received some public attention as of recently due to rising Dominican American singer Kat DeLuna, who is signed to Edmond's music label, GMB (Global Music Brand). He ran the production company with good friend Greg Maurice. He just signed a producer in Belgium by the name of EightySix. He also started the fashion line Royal Laundry. According to a brief interview DeLuna granted on HaitiXchange.com, she stated that she first met Tyrone when she was only 14 years old, who was then scouting for talent. Kat and Tyrone have become good friends ever since. He directed the music video of Kat Deluna's first single "Unstoppable" featuring Lil Wayne of her second album. Outside of modeling, he is involved in charities
