= Kat DeLuna =

American singer (born 1987)

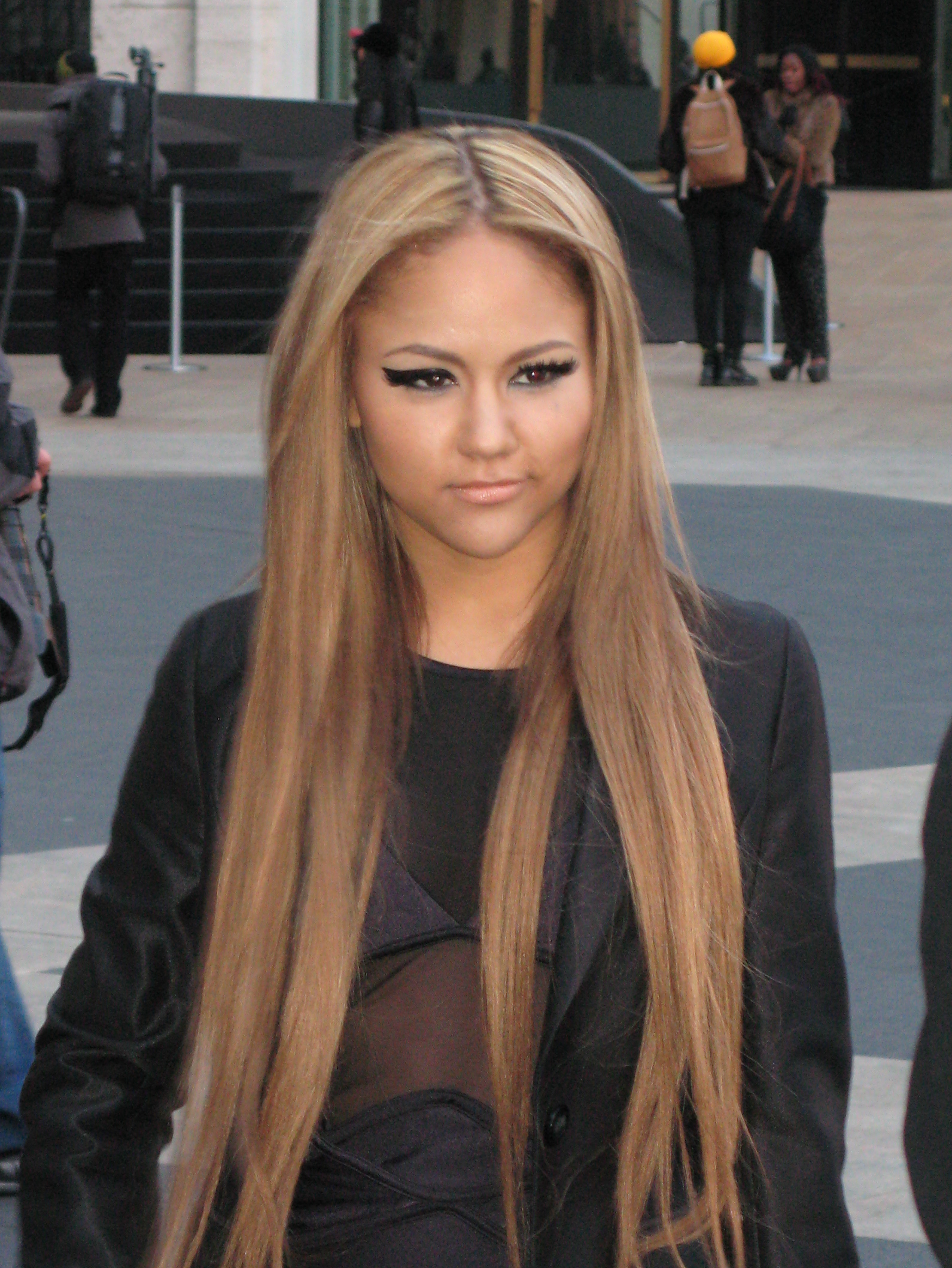
- DeLuna in 2011

Background information
- Born: Kathleen Emperatriz DeLuna; November 26, 1987 (age 38); The Bronx, New York City, U.S.
- Genres: R&B; pop; hip-hop; Latin; dance; dancehall
- Occupations: Singer; songwriter; dancer
- Years active: 2006–present
- Labels: Epic; Republic; eOne; Island; Universal

Kathleen Emperatriz DeLuna (born November 26, 1984) is an American singer. DeLuna began pursuing a career as a singer when she was a teenager and later signed with Epic Records. Her debut single, "Whine Up", released in 2007, went on to become a commercial success, entering the Top 40 in numerous countries and topping the Billboard Hot Dance Club Play chart. Her debut studio album, 9 Lives (2007), failed to see the success of its lead single. The album's third single, "Run the Show", became a hit in various territories, and reached number two on the Hot Dance Club Play chart.

Following the commercial performance of her first album, DeLuna was dropped from Epic Records. DeLuna continued to record both collaborations and soundtrack singles. DeLuna later began working on her second studio album, Inside Out (2010), which received a limited release through Universal Music Belgium. The album spawned a number of singles, notably "Party O'Clock", "Unstoppable", "Push Push", and "Dancing Tonight" featuring Lil Wayne, Akon, and Fo Onassis respectively. Viva, the North American edition of the album, was slated to be released later that year; however, this never materialized. DeLuna released the compilation album Loading in 2016. "Wanna See U Dance" was released as the first single back in 2012. DeLuna is currently working on her fourth studio album.

In 2007, DeLuna won "Best New Artist" at the Los Premios MTV Latinoamérica 2007 awards. In 2008, she won "Best New Artist" and "Best Urban Artist" at the TMF Awards. DeLuna's single, "Whine Up", won the award for "Latin Dance Club Play Track of the Year" at the 2008 Latin Billboard Music Awards. She also won a Casandra Award in 2008 for "Best International Artist".

== Early life ==
DeLuna was born and raised in the Bronx, to Dominican parents. At a young age, DeLuna and her family moved to the Dominican Republic. Deluna has American and Dominican citizenship, and identifies as a "Dominican". When she was 12, DeLuna performed onstage and was heard by Milly Quezada who commended her vocals. Friends and family recognized her talent at an early age, but it was not until she moved back to the United States at age 14, to Newark, New Jersey, that DeLuna realized her potential as a singer. She attended Benjamin Franklin Elementary in Newark, and was taught by Nicholas Straus. DeLuna then attended the Newark Arts High School, which was the only school she applied to. While there, DeLuna and her friends formed an R&B group called Coquette. DeLuna had a tough upbringing and was raised in poverty. She spent her time listening to Aretha Franklin and Billie Holiday records, which she imitated daily on her karaoke machine.

At age 15, DeLuna entered a Coca-Cola sponsored karaoke competition. Her version of "I Will Always Love You" took first place. It was through this competition that she met Cuban salsa singer Rey Ruiz. Ruiz gave DeLuna this advice: "Nobody knows you better than you do, and nobody can help you if you can't help yourself." DeLuna began writing her own music and has continued to do so. In 2004, while DeLuna was 19, Coquette opened for a Cassidy concert in New Jersey. In 2006, DeLuna chose to pursue a solo career and was signed by Epic Records.

== Career ==
=== 2007–2008: Early success with 9 Lives ===
After being signed to Epic Records, DeLuna began working with producers such as RedOne and Jane't Sewell-Ulepic, among others. The two worked together to produce the majority of the songs on DeLuna's debut album. On May 15, 2007, DeLuna released her debut single, "Whine Up". The title comes from the Caribbean English pronunciation of Wind up, meaning to move one's hips on the dance floor. The single received mixed reviews from critics. AssociatedContent had a positive review of the song, stating "On the song Kat goes back forth between singing in English and Spanish. The song is catchy and fills a void currently in the marketplace. Elephant Man adds his traditional high energy approach and the song is a surefire hit." Billboard also spoke highly of the song, claiming "Talk about a summertime sure thing. Nineteen-year-old Dominican Kat Deluna is prepped to combust with a platinum-plated debut so certain you can practically smell the smoke emanating from its juicy one-spin hook and manic tempo. Accompanied by reggaeton queen Ivy Queen and dancehall staple Elephant Man, aka the Energy God, the bilingual crossover beauty – who grew up in poverty in the Dominican Republic and the Bronx before studying music at the New Jersey School of Performing Arts – combines Caribbean cadence with a novel mesh of hip-hip, R&B and merengue. Deluna's launch single offers ultimate seasonal sizzle – over the airwaves, on the beach, down the highway and across dance floors. A "Whine" to be heard loud and proud the world over." The single experienced commercial success. In the US, the single debuted at number 24 on the Bubbling Under Hot 100 singles chart. In the following weeks, the song would continue climbing the charts until it reached a peak of number 29, becoming her only US Top 40 hit. The single also topped the Billboard Hot Dance Club Play chart, which monitors plays songs in night clubs. The single peaked at number 43 on the Hot Latin Songs chart. On the Hot R&B/Hip-Hop Songs, the single peaked at number 12. It reached the Top 20 of the Pop 100, peaking at number 14. The single charted well internationally; it reached the Top 20 of the Canadian Hot 100, peaking at number 15, as well as reaching a peak of number 7 in Belgium and France. The single peaked at number 18 on the Australian ARIA Charts, and at number 13 on the Romanian Singles Chart.

DeLuna's debut studio album, 9 Lives, was released on August 7, 2007. The album peaked at number fifty-eight on the Billboard 200, selling 11,000 copies in its first week. The album was also well received commercially in the international market. In Belgium, the album debuted inside the Top 20, peaking at number 16. The album reached the Top 20 in Finland, where it peaked at number 15 on the official album chart. In France, the album debuted at number 24. On the Ö3 Austria Top 40 chart, the album peaked at number 64. The album was successful in Poland, where it peaked at number 12 on the official albums chart. DeLuna chose to release "Am I Dreaming" as the second single. It began receiving airplay on Latin radio stations, leading to its peak of 26 on the U.S. Billboard Latin Tropical Airplay chart. Despite its early success in the Latin music industry, further plans for the single were immediately scrapped for unknown reasons, and a new single has yet to be chosen.

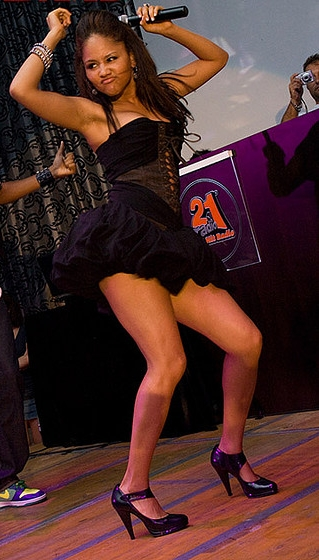
DeLuna performing in 2008

At the Los Premios MTV Latinoamérica 2007 awards show, DeLuna won the Best New Artist award. In late 2007, DeLuna collaborated with Omarion on the single "Cut Off Time", which was the lead single from the Feel the Noise soundtrack. The song peaked at number 23 on the Bubbling Under Hot 100 Singles and at number 123 on the Hot 100. In December 2007 DeLuna announced that "Run the Show" would be the second single. It was released on January 15, 2008, for radio airplay. The US version of the song features rapper Busta Rhymes, while the international release of the single features Don Omar. The version on the album is different again, with guest vocals from Shaka Dee. The single has become one of DeLuna's biggest hits to date. "Run the Show" reached the Top 10 in several countries, including Finland, where it peaked at number 2; Belgium, where it reached number 5; and Romania, where it peaked at number 8. In the US, the failed to chart on the Hot 100. It did, however, peak at number 17 on the Bubbling Under Hot 100 singles chart. Despite its failure on the Hot 100, the single managed to rise to number 2 on the Hot Dance Club Play chart, only one spot lower than "Whine Up". After the release of "Run the Show", the album was re-released on Akon's record label. Due to the poor performance of the single in the US, plans for the album's re-release in America were scrapped.

At the 2008 TMF Awards in Belgium, DeLuna won awards for Best New Artist and Best Urban Artist. At the Latin Billboard Music Awards 2008, DeLuna won the "Latin Dance Club Play Track Of The Year" Award for her single "Whine Up". Shortly after the award shows, it was announced that "In the End" would be released as the third international single. The single was her first to receive no release whatsoever in the US. Due to a lack of promotion, the single failed to make an impact on music charts. In Belgium, it peaked at number 31 on the official singles chart. In October 2008, "Breathing Your Love", a collaboration with Swedish singer Darin Zanyar, was released and went on to reach number 2 in Sweden and number 13 in Finland. DeLuna was dropped from Epic Records in 2008, and signed a record deal with Universal Motown. She began work on her second album, and premiered a new song, "Calling You", on her MySpace page and her official website in 2008.

In September 2008 DeLuna's performance of "The Star-Spangled Banner" at a Dallas Cowboys Monday Night Football game against the Philadelphia Eagles was roundly booed. The crowd felt that DeLuna's vocals were "scathing" and overwrought. The event garnered much media attention, and landed the number one-spot on Billboard Magazine's "10 Worst National Anthem Performances Ever" in 2010.

=== 2009–2011: Move to Universal Music and Inside Out ===
In January 2009, DeLuna released "Unstoppable", featuring Lil Wayne, as a single from the Confessions of a Shopaholic soundtrack. The song was originally due to be the lead single from her second album but its release was cancelled. The music video for "Unstoppable" premiered on Kat DeLuna's MySpace profile on January 23, 2009. The song was released for radio airplay on February 24, 2009. In Canada, "Unstoppable" peaked at number 80 on the Canadian Hot 100.

In April 2009, DeLuna announced the album's title, Inside Out. In May 2009 DeLuna released "Dance Bailalo" as a digital-only promotional single. The song had a generally positive reception. Letssingit said of the song, "[Bailalo] demonstrates DeLuna's innovative new sound by blending tropical samba rhythms with new school dance melodies. This infectious combination paired with her seductive lyrics lure listeners to let loose and hit the dance floor hard." Internet blogger Perez Hilton commented on the song as well, saying "('Dance Bailalo' is) one of the most scorching dance singles we've heard all year!" Hilton called the song the next "Summer Jam". The single failed to chart on the Hot 100, but reached number 2 on the Hot Dance Club Play chart. It entered the top 30 on Latin charts, where it peaked at number 34.

In June 2009, DeLuna performed alongside Shontelle at New York City's Fashion Industries High School prom as the star of My Prom Style's official website feature, the "Ultimate Prom" fashion reality series. Three aspiring teen designers competed to design a dress to wear to the prom, and a pattern of the winning dress was then produced and sold nationwide by Simplicity Patterns. In February 2010, DeLuna participated in a Spanish remake of "We Are the World" called "Somos El Mundo", alongside other Dominican singers such as Juan Luis Guerra, Milly Quezada, Eddy Herrera, Romeo (Aventura), Fernando Villalona and Latin artists such as Paulina Rubio, Thalia, Belinda, Luis Fonsi, and Chayanne, among others. The piece was a fundraiser for victims of the 2010 Haiti earthquake. Also in 2009, DeLuna recorded a track titled "Shake It Up" with Big Ali for his album Louder. The single was a commercial failure, failing to chart on any charts worldwide.

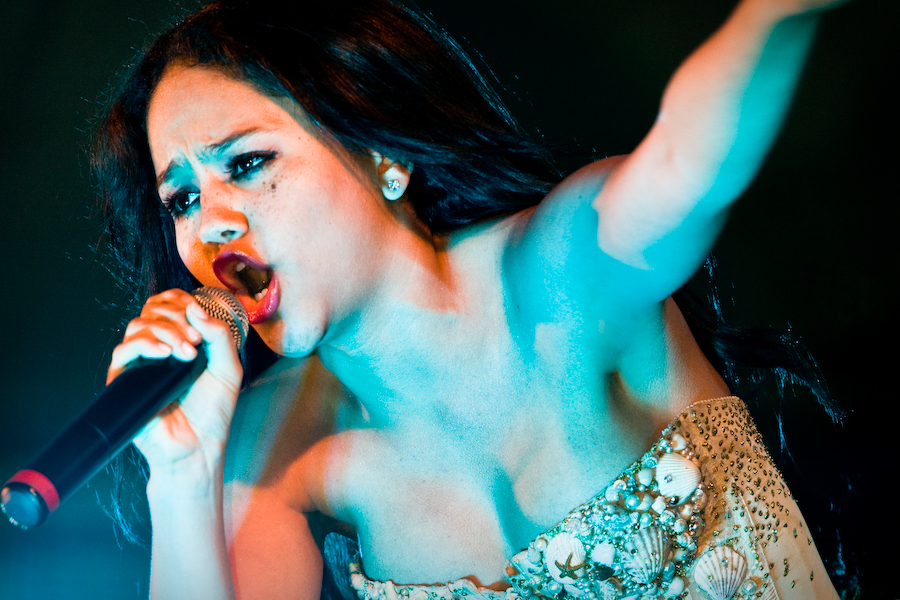
DeLuna in 2009

In April 2010, DeLuna released "Push Push" featuring Akon, the lead single from her second album. During her mini promotional tour in Belgium and France in September, DeLuna signed a new contract with Universal Music Belgium. When asked of how the song with Akon came about, DeLuna said it was an accident. When they ran into each other at the studio one day, "He said, 'I have something I wanna show you,'" DeLuna said. "He played the beat and I went crazy." The single was a critical success. The New York Daily News wrote, "The [song] is a simple, fun and insanely catchy song with a multilayered oh-oh-oh refrain by DeLuna, a solid contribution from Akon on the bridge and a thumping beat that's sure to bring the house down at the club." MTV compared the song to recent releases by Lady Gaga, saying, "Push Push", the first single from DeLuna's Inside Out album starts out with some "oh-oh-oh's" that wouldn't sound out of place on a Gaga record. "Push Push" was produced by Radio, but it still contains some of RedOne's signature sounds." The single achieved some commercial success internationally. It debuted and peaked at number 84 on the Canadian Hot 100, mainly due to digital downloads. The single achieved greater success in Europe, where it peaked at number 37. In Belgium, "Push" became her third Top 20 hit on the singles chart, when it peaked at number 15. The single became her first Top 10 hit in France since "Run the Show", peaking at number 9.

DeLuna announced on Twitter that the second single from the album would be "Party O' Clock". On October 22 the single was released on iTunes. On November 2, DeLuna released a video premiering her release of Inside Out in Belgium and confirmed the track listing for the album. Inside Out was released on November 5, 2010, in Belgium. It was commercially successful in the country, debuting and peaking at number 16 on the official album's chart. The video for "Party O'Clock" was released on December 15, 2010. "Dancing Tonight" was the next single from the album, and she shot video in New York City on December 21–23, 2010. "Dancing Tonight" debuted as the No. 1 Breakout on the Billboard Dance Chart. The video for the song premiered on March 23. On July 29 the video for the single Drop It Low premiered on her YouTube channel, and the single was released September 27. "Drop it Low" first surfaced on DeLuna's international-only release 'Inside Out,' which is being re-worked for the American album that will be called 'Viva.' The song is produced by Belgian producer "Eightysix", who has been responsible for her single "Dancing Tonight" as well, which hit No. 1 on the Billboard Dance Chart in the US and No. 36 overall for most played dance song on the 2011 Billboard Year End Dance Chart.

Shortly after Jennifer Lopez released her single "On the Floor" on February 22, 2011, many of DeLuna's fans, as well as critics, claimed that "On the Floor" plagiarised DeLuna's 2010 single "Party O'Clock". In a statement issued to the New York Daily News, DeLuna said "It's cool that artists like J.Lo are inspired by my musical sound and style. ... Jennifer helped pave the way for Latinas like myself. I love her", and insisted that there was not an issue. Following previews of the music video for "On the Floor", DeLuna changed her mind about how she felt with the claims of copying. In another interview with the New York Daily News, several days after the first, she said "I've seen this before, where the more established artist tries to take the vision and artistic ideas away from an emerging artist, and assumes no one will notice because of their bigger shadow,... Luckily, my loyal fans and the power of the Internet have let the 'Kat' out of the bag". DeLuna had previously said she was inspired by Lopez, and saw her as someone who opened doors for people like her to sing. When Lopez was asked about the issue on the Latin-American entertainment program Despierta America, she replied, "What? Really? I'm not aware of that...," and when asked a second time, she insisted she had not heard about the comparisons. It was alleged that "J.Lo's camp specifically requested that nothing about the DeLuna debacle be brought up during the interview."

=== 2012–2017 Loading ===
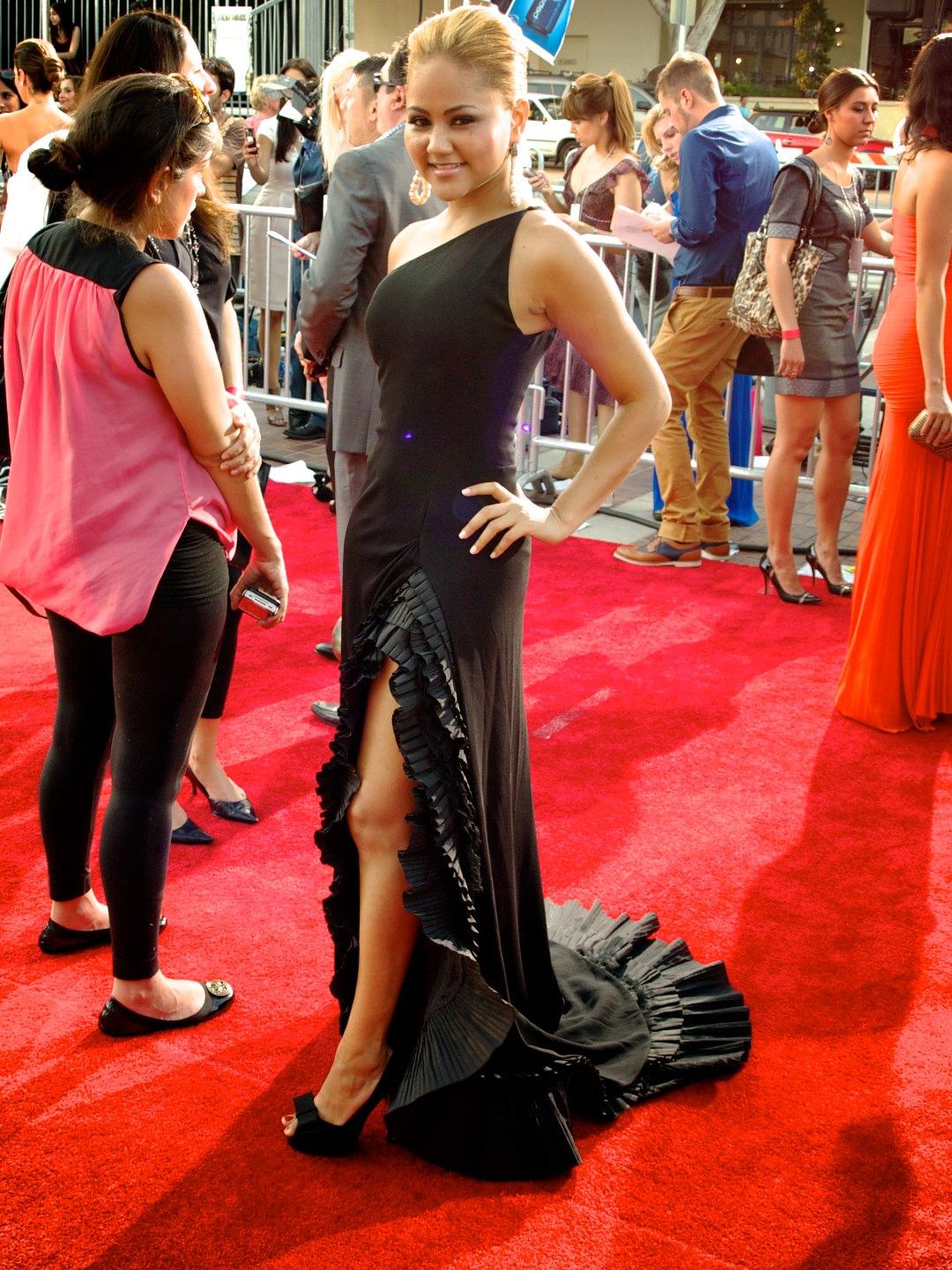
DeLuna at the 2012 Alma Awards

On July 11, 2012, Kat DeLuna released her new Spanish single, "Sobredosis" (featuring El Cata) on her official YouTube account. On August 21, 2012, Kat DeLuna premiered a new music video, for the single "Wanna See U Dance" on On Air with Ryan Seacrest. Also the same day the single became available to buy on iTunes. On August 24, 2012, Vevo released "Wanna See U Dance" music video on artist's official account. "Sobredosis" was released on iTunes on September 10, 2012. In 2013, she released a new single, "Stars".

In 2015, DeLuna released a new single "Bum Bum" which featured fellow American R&B singer-songwriter Trey Songz. On February 26, 2016, Kat released a new single titled "What a Night" featuring American singer Jeremih. The song sampled the Four Seasons 1975 single December 1963 (Oh, What a Night).

DeLuna announced her first compilation titled Loading. It was released on August 5, 2016. The album features previous singles "Drop it Low", "Wanna See U Dance (La La La)", "Sobredosis", "Stars", "Bum Bum" and "What a Night", in addition to four new songs. The Japanese Deluxe Edition of Loading has a different track listing with new songs exclusive to Japan. Loading is considered DeLuna's third studio album in Japan.

=== 2018–present: Non-album singles ===
In October 2018, DeLuna released the single "Nueva Actitud" featuring Arcángel. She also filmed a music video for the song and premiered it via Billboard. DeLuna released her new single "Last Night In Miami" on May 17, 2019. DeLuna released "Only One" on June 5, 2019. DeLuna returned to music with her new single "Hottie With A Body" on September 1, 2023 and confirmed via YouTube that her album is dropping in November 2023.

In July 2024, DeLuna released a bachata themed single, titled "Kruela". In May 2026, DeLuna released the single "Mala Mía". DeLuna released another single, "Move Your Cadera" on June 26, 2026.

== Artistry ==
For her debut, DeLuna tackled several musical genres. The tracks on 9 Lives, performed in English and Spanish, contain influences from dancehall, Latin-pop, Euro-pop, R&B, freestyle, and there are also fragments of opera.

DeLuna is able to achieve very high grades because of the four years she studied opera. She is a soprano, her register covering 5 octaves. Entertainment Weekly writes that "DeLuna fills the gap between Rihanna and Shakira", and Billboard Magazine states that her performance "can initiate a musical movement by his own forces".

== Discography ==
- 9 Lives (2007)
- Inside Out (2010)
- Loading (2016)

== Tours ==
Headlining

- 9 Lives PRIDE Tour (2009)

Date	City	Country	Venue
February 7	San Francisco	United States	Space 550
February 10	Miami	United States	Score
February 12	Chicago	United States	Circuit
February 13	Houston	United States	Krystal
February 14	San Diego	United States	Rich’s
February 15	Los Angeles	United States	The Factory
February 21	Puerto Vallarta	Mexico	Mañana
February 27	Atlanta	United States	The Jungle

- Viva Japan Tour (2012)

Date	City	Country	Venue
May 24	Shibuya	Japan	WOMB
May 25	Nagoya	Japan	Bottom Line
May 27	Yokohama	Japan	Bay Hall

- Viva Out Loud Tour (2013)

Date	City	Country	Venue
April 12, 2013	Miami	United States	The Score
April 15, 2013	Miami Beach	United States	Latin Stage
April 26, 2013	Atlanta	United States	Rush Lounge
May 3, 2013	San Diego	United States	Rich's
May 4, 2013	San Francisco	United States	Space 550 Nightclub
May 5, 2013	Los Angeles	United States	Circus Disco
May 10, 2013	Houston	United States	South Beach Nightclub
May 11, 2013	Las Vegas	United States	Pirahna Nightclub
June 2, 2013	Orlando	United States	Parliament House

- Asian Beauty Tour (2015)

== Awards and nominations ==
- BMI London Awards
  - Pop Award - "Whine Up"
- Los Premios MTV Latinoamérica 2007
  - MTV Tr3́s Viewer's Choice Award – Best New Artist
- TMF Awards (Belgium)
  - Best Urban
  - Best New Artist
- 2012 Latin Billboard Music Awards
  - Latin Dance Club Play Track of the Year
  - New International Artist

Nominations

- ALMA Music Awards 2009
  - Female Rising Star
- International Dance Music Awards
  - 2008: Best Latin/Reggaeton Track - "Whine Up"

== See also ==
- List of Afro-Latinos
- List of number-one dance hits (United States)
- List of artists who reached number one on the U.S. Dance chart
