= Omarion discography =

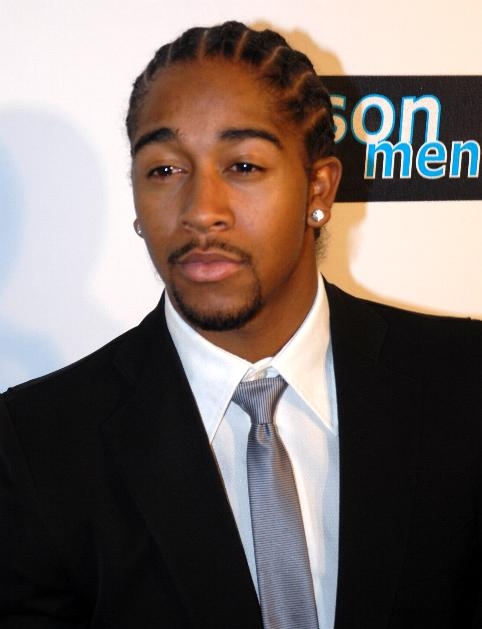
- Omarion in 2007
- Studio albums: 9
- Extended plays: 5
- Compilation albums: 2
- Singles: 30
- Music videos: 27
- Mixtapes: 1

American singer Omarion has released nine studio albums, three collaborative albums, two extended plays (EPs), one mixtape and thirty-seven singles (including thirteen as a featured artist).

== Albums ==
=== Studio albums ===
List of studio albums, with selected chart positions, sales figures and certifications
| Title | Album details | Peak chart positions | | | | | Sales | Certifications |
| Title | Album details | US | US R&B | AUS | CAN | UK | Sales | Certifications |
|---|---|---|---|---|---|---|---|---|
| O | Released: February 22, 2005; Label: Epic, Sony; Formats: CD, digital download | 1 | 1 | 83 | 75 | 129 | US: 765,000 | RIAA: Gold |
| 21 | Released: December 26, 2006; Label: Epic, RCA, Sony; Format: CD, digital download | 1 | 1 | — | — | 24 | US: 390,000 | |
| Face Off (with Bow Wow) | Released: December 6, 2007; Label: Columbia, RCA, Sony BMG; Formats: CD, digital download | 11 | 2 | — | — | — | | RIAA: Gold |
| Ollusion | Released: January 8, 2010; Label: StarWorld, EMI, MusicWorks; Format: CD, digital download | 19 | 7 | — | — | — | US: 78,000 | |
| Sex Playlist | Released: December 2, 2014; Label: Maybach, Atlantic; Format: LP, digital download | 49 | 2 | — | — | — | US: 43,000 | |
| The Kinection | Released: October 30, 2020; Label: Omarion Worldwide, Warner; Format: Digital download, streaming | — | — | — | — | — | | |
| Full Circle: Sonic Book One | Released: May 5, 2023; Label: Omarion Worldwide; Format: Digital download, streaming | — | — | — | — | — | | |
| Full Circle: Sonic Book Two | Released: December 15, 2023; Label: Omarion Worldwide; Format: Digital download, streaming | — | — | — | — | — | | |
| 02 - Part 1 | Released: June 26, 2026; Label: Omarion Worldwide; Format: Digital download, streaming | — | — | — | — | — | | |

=== Compilation albums ===
List of collaborative albums, with selected chart positions, sales figures and certifications
| Title | Album details | Peak chart positions | | | | | Sales |
| Title | Album details | US | US R&B | US Rap | CAN | FRA | Sales |
|---|---|---|---|---|---|---|---|
| Self Made Vol. 2 (with Maybach Music Group) | Released: June 22, 2012; Label: Maybach Music Group, Warner Bros.; Formats: CD, digital download | 4 | 1 | 1 | 37 | — | US: 216,000 |
| Self Made Vol. 3 (with Maybach Music Group) | Released: September 17, 2013; Label: Maybach Music Group, Atlantic; Format: CD, digital download | 4 | 1 | 1 | — | 182 | |

=== Extended plays ===
List of extended plays with selected details
| Title | Album details |
|---|---|
| Care Package | Released: November 29, 2012; Label: Maybach Music Group, Warner Bros.; Formats: Digital download |
| Care Package 2 | Released: November 5, 2013; Label: Maybach Music Group, Warner Bros.; Formats: Digital download |
| Care Package 3 | Released: November 12, 2015; Label: Maybach Music Group, Atlantic, Art Club; Formats: Digital download |
| Care Package 4 | Released: November 17, 2017; Label: Maybach Music Group, Atlantic, Omarion Worldwide; Formats: Digital download |
| With A Little Help From My Friends | Released: January 28, 2022; Label: Oro Music, Omarion Worldwide; Formats: Digital download |
| SexSonics | Released: March 29, 2024; Label: Omarion Worldwide; Formats: Digital download, streaming |

=== Mixtapes ===
List of mixtapes with selected details
| Title | Album details |
|---|---|
| The Awakening | Released: May 11, 2011; Label: StarWorld Entertainment; Hosted by DJ Drama |

=== DVDs ===
List of DVDs with selected chart positions, sales figures and certifications
| Title | DVD details | Certifications |
|---|---|---|
| Scream Tour IV (with Bow Wow) | Released: December 13, 2005; Label: Sony Urban Music, Columbia, Epic; Formats: DVD, digital download | RIAA: Gold |

== Singles ==
=== As lead artist ===
List of singles as lead artist, with selected chart positions and certifications, showing year released and album name
| Title | Year | Peak chart positions | | | | | | | | | Certifications | Album |
| Title | Year | US | US R&B/HH | AUS | CAN | DEN | GER | IRE | NZ | UK | Certifications | Album |
|---|---|---|---|---|---|---|---|---|---|---|---|---|
| "O" | 2004 | 27 | 12 | — | — | — | — | — | 14 | 47 | RIAA: Gold | O |
| "Touch" | 2004 | 94 | 35 | — | — | — | — | — | — | — | | O |
| "I'm Tryna" | 2005 | — | 53 | — | — | — | — | — | — | — | | O |
| "Entourage" | 2006 | 78 | 25 | — | — | — | — | — | 30 | 58 | | 21 |
| "Ice Box" (featuring Timbaland) | 2006 | 12 | 5 | 36 | 94 | 14 | 40 | 42 | 10 | 14 | RIAA: Gold; BPI: Silver; RMNZ: Platinum | 21 |
| "Cut Off Time" (featuring Kat DeLuna) | 2007 | — | — (Note: "Cut Off Time" did not enter the Hot R&B/Hip-Hop Songs chart, but peaked at number 23 on the Bubbling Under R&B/Hip-Hop Singles chart.) | — | — | — | — | — | — | — | | Feel the Noise soundtrack |
| "Girlfriend" (with Bow Wow) | 2007 | 33 | 20 | — | — | — | — | — | 7 | 182 | RMNZ: Gold | Face Off |
| "Hey Baby (Jump Off)" (with Bow Wow) | 2007 | — (Note: "Hey Baby (Jump Off)" did not enter the Billboard Hot 100, but peaked at number two on the Bubbling Under Hot 100 Singles chart.) | — | — | — | — | — | — | 25 | — | RMNZ: Gold | Face Off |
| "I Get It In" (featuring Gucci Mane) | 2009 | 83 | 20 | — | — | — | — | — | — | — | | Ollusion |
| "Speedin'" | 2010 | — (Note: "Speedin'" did not enter the Billboard Hot 100, but peaked at number five on the Bubbling Under Hot 100 Singles chart.) | 26 | — | — | — | — | — | — | — | | Ollusion |
| "Last Night (Kinkos)" (featuring Snoop Dogg) | 2010 | — | 78 | — | — | — | — | — | — | — | | Ollusion |
| "Cut a Rug" | 2011 | — | — | — | — | — | — | — | — | — | | The Awakening |
| "Let's Talk" (featuring Rick Ross) | 2012 | — | 30 | — | — | — | — | — | — | — | | Self Made Vol. 2 |
| "Paradise" | 2013 | — | — | — | — | — | — | — | — | — | | Non-album single |
| "Know You Better" (featuring Pusha T and Fabolous) | 2013 | — | — (Note: "Know You Better" did not enter the Hot R&B/Hip-Hop Songs chart, but peaked at number four on the Bubbling Under R&B/Hip-Hop Singles chart.) | — | — | — | — | — | — | — | | Self Made Vol. 3 |
| "You Like It" | 2014 | — | — | — | — | — | — | — | — | — | | Sex Playlist |
| "Post to Be" (featuring Chris Brown and Jhené Aiko) | 2014 | 13 | 5 | 79 | 49 | — | — | — | — | 74 | RIAA: 6× Platinum; BPI : Platinum; RMNZ: 3× Platinum | Sex Playlist |
| "I'm Up" (featuring Kid Ink and French Montana) | 2015 | — (Note: "I'm Up" did not enter the Billboard Hot 100, but peaked at number nine on the Bubbling Under Hot 100 Singles chart.) | 41 | — | — | — | — | — | — | — | RMNZ: Gold | Non-album single |
| "I'm Sayin'" (featuring Rich Homie Quan) | 2015 | — | — | — | — | — | — | — | — | — | | Care Package 3 |
| "Okay Ok" (featuring C'Zar) | 2016 | — | — | — | — | — | — | — | — | — | | Non-album singles |
| "Distance" | 2017 | — | — (Note: "Distance" did not enter the Hot R&B/Hip-Hop Songs chart, but peaked at number 39 on the Mainstream R&B/Hip-Hop chart, which is an airplay only component.) | — | — | — | — | — | — | — | RMNZ: Platinum | Non-album singles |
| "Can You Hear Me?" (featuring T-Pain) | 2020 | — | — | — | — | — | — | — | — | — | | The Kinection |
| "Involved" | 2020 | — | — | — | — | — | — | — | — | — | | The Kinection |
| "EX" (featuring Bow Wow and Soulja Boy) | 2021 | — | — | — | — | — | — | — | — | — | | Non-album single |
"—" denotes a recording that did not chart or was not released in that territory.

=== As featured artist ===
List of singles as featured artist, with selected chart positions and certifications, showing year released and album name
| Title | Year | Peak chart positions | | | | Certifications | Album |
| Title | Year | US | US R&B/HH | AUS | UK | Certifications | Album |
|---|---|---|---|---|---|---|---|
| "After Party" (Young Rome featuring Omarion and Marques Houston) | 2004 | — | 58 | — | — | | Food for Thought |
| "Wake Up Everybody" (with Various Artists) | 2004 | — | 69 | — | — | | Wake Up Everybody |
| "Let Me Hold You" (Bow Wow featuring Omarion) | 2005 | 4 | 2 | 14 | 27 | RIAA: Platinum; BPI : Silver; RMNZ: 2× Platinum | Wanted |
| "Betterman" (K. Smith featuring Omarion) | 2007 | — | — | — | — | | Non-album single |
| "We Get It On" (Red Café featuring Omarion) | 2011 | — | 95 | — | — | | Above the Cloudz |
| "What You Want" (Rich Rick featuring Omarion) | 2011 | — | — | — | — | | Non-album singles |
| "Restraint" (M$ney featuring Omarion) | 2012 | — | — | — | — | | Non-album singles |
| "Army" (Sultan + Ned Shepard and NERVO featuring Omarion) | 2013 | — | — | — | — | | Non-album singles |
| "Gon Get It" (LoveRance featuring Omarion) | 2013 | — | — | — | — | | Freak of the Industry |
| "Cry" (La Fouine featuring Omarion) | 2014 | — | — | — | — | | Non-album singles |
| "Fakin" (Diggy Simmons featuring Ty Dolla Sign and Omarion) | 2015 | — | — | — | — | | Non-album singles |
| "When You Say" (Jay 305 featuring Omarion) | 2017 | — | — | — | — | | Taking All Bets |
| "Tell Me" (Anatii featuring Omarion) | 2018 | — | — | — | — | | Artiifact |
"—" denotes a recording that did not chart or was not released in that territory.

=== Promotional singles ===
List of promotional singles, showing year released and album name
| Title | Year | Album |
|---|---|---|
| "Hood Star" (with Bow Wow) | 2007 | Face Off |
| "Hoodie" (featuring Jay Rock) | 2010 | Ollusion |
| "Work" | 2014 | Sex Playlist |
| "Sweet Anita'" | 2015 | Non-album single |
| "I Ain't Even Done" (featuring Ghostface Killah) | 2016 | The Kinection |
| "It's Whatever" | 2016 | Non-album singles |
| "BDY On Me" | 2017 | Non-album singles |

== Other charted songs ==
List of songs, with selected chart positions, showing year released and album name
| Title | Year | Peak chart positions | | Album |
| Title | Year | US | US R&B/HH | Album |
|---|---|---|---|---|
| "Damn" (featuring Young Rome) | 2004 | — | 75 | Non-album single |
| "M.I.A." (featuring Wale) | 2012 | — | 50 | Self Made Vol. 2 |
| "Screwin" (Summer Walker featuring Omarion) | 2021 | 73 | 33 | Still Over It |

== Guest appearances ==
List of non-single guest appearances, with other performing artists, showing year released and album name
| Title | Year | Other artist(s) | Album |
|---|---|---|---|
| "Alone" | 2003 | Marques Houston | MH |
| "Bria's Interlude" | 2009 | Drake | So Far Gone |
| "Arch Yo Back" | 2011 | Crazy Cousinz | none |
| "Pleasure & Pain" | 2011 | Kevin McCall | Un-Invited Guest |
| "Still My Baby" | 2011 | Wolfgang Gartner | Weekend in America |
| "Slow" | 2012 | Koda Kumi | Japonesque |
| "Restraint" | 2012 | M$ney Bags | Alter Ego |
| "Star" | 2012 | D&D | Unforgettable Mixtape |
| "Formula." | 2012 | D&D | Unforgettable Mixtape |
| "M.I.A." | 2012 | Wale | Self Made Vol. 2 |
| "Ice Cold" | 2012 | Rick Ross | God Forgives, I Don't |
| "Bag of Money" (Extended Remix) | 2012 | Wale, Rick Ross, T-Pain, Yo Gotti, Lil Wayne, French Montana, Black Cobain, Trina, Rockie Fresh, Tyga | Self Made 2 |
| "Million Dolla Chillin" | 2012 | The Rej3ctz | CR33ZTAPE |
| "Gon Get It" | 2013 | LoveRance | Freak of the Industry |
| "Army" | 2013 | Sultan & Shepard, NERVO | none |
| "Switch Positions" | 2013 | Joe Budden | No Love Lost |
| "Step It Up" | 2013 | Problem, Iamsu!, Short Dawg | Million Dollar Afro |
| "Soldier Cries" | 2013 | Lonny Bereal, Anthony Hamilton, John P. Kee, Jamie Foxx, Dave Hollister, Tyrese | none |
| "Put It On U" | 2013 | TeeFlii, Fat Box | Fireworks |
| "Paris" | 2013 | Stalley, Rockie Fresh | Self Made 3 |
| "Give Her What She Wants" | 2014 | Young Breed | Seven Tre Chevrolet |
| "Cry" | 2014 | La Fouine | Capitale du crime volume 4 |
| "Team" | 2014 | Truth Denerio, KNS Tha Engineer | none |
| "No One" | 2015 | Kid Cali | Kid Cali |
| "90's Interlude" | 2015 | Los | God, Money, War |
| "Know It" | 2015 | Problem | Mollywood 3: The Relapse (Side B) |
| "Summer in the Winter" | 2015 | Kid Ink | Summer in the Winter |

== Music videos ==
| Song | Year | Artist(s) | Director(s) |
|---|---|---|---|
| "After Party" | 2004 | Young Rome featuring Omarion and Marques Houston | none |
| "O" | 2004 | Omarion | Chris Stokes |
| "Touch" | 2004 | Omarion | Chris Stokes |
| "I'm Tryna" | 2004 | Omarion | Chris Stokes |
| "Let Me Hold You" | 2005 | Bow Wow featuring Omarion | Bryan Barber |
| "Entourage" | 2006 | Omarion | Chris Stokes |
| "Ice Box" | 2006 | Omarion featuring Timbaland | Anthony Mandler |
| "Betterman" | 2007 | K. Smith featuring Omarion | none |
| "Cut Off Time" | 2007 | Omarion featuring Kat DeLuna | none |
| "Girlfriend" | 2007 | Bow Wow and Omarion | Chris Stokes |
| "Hey Baby (Jump Off)" | 2007 | Bow Wow and Omarion | Chris Stokes |
| "I Get It In" | 2009 | Omarion featuring Gucci Mane | Omarion |
| "Hoodie" | 2009 | Omarion featuring Jay Rock | Chris Stokes and Kevin Shulman |
| "Speedin'" | 2010 | Omarion | Chris Stokes and Kevin Shulman |
| "We Get It On" | 2011 | Red Café featuring Omarion | Ramon Cruz |
| "Come n Fuck Wit Me" | 2011 | Omarion | Yolande Geralds |
| "Battle" | 2011 | Omarion featuring Red Café | Yolande Geralds |
| "Cut a Rug" | 2011 | Omarion | Yolande Geralds |
| "Arch Your Back" | 2011 | Crazy Cousinz featuring Omarion | Yolande Geralds |
| "What You Want" | 2011 | Rich Rick featuring Omarion | Evan Romoff |
| "Let's Talk" | 2012 | Omarion featuring Rick Ross | Spiff TV |
| "M.I.A." | 2012 | Omarion featuring Wale | Topshelf Junior |
| "Ice Cold" | 2013 | Rick Ross featuring Omarion | DREFilms |
| "Admire" | 2013 | Omarion featuring Tank and Problem | Topshelf Junior |
| "Paradise" | 2013 | Omarion | Topshelf Junior |
| "Know You Better" | 2013 | Omarion featuring Pusha T and Fabolous | Topshelf Junior |
| "Leave You Alone" | 2013 | Omarion | Topshelf Junior |
| "Work" | 2014 | Omarion | Topshelf Junior |
| "Post to Be" | 2015 | Omarion featuring Chris Brown and Jhene Aiko | Jay Ahn and Omarion |
| "I'm Up" | 2015 | Omarion featuring Kid Ink and French Montana | Jay Ahn and Omarion |
| "Summer in the Winter" | 2016 | Kid Ink featuring Omarion | Mike Ho |
| "Okay Ok" | 2016 | Omarion featuring C'Zar | Omarion and Deji LaRay |
| "BDY On Me" | 2017 | Omarion | Omarion and Deji LaRay |
| "Distance" | 2017 | Omarion | Omarion and Deji LaRay |
| "The Reasons" | 2017 | Omarion | Omarion and Deji LaRay |
| "W4W (Word 4 Word)" | 2017 | Omarion | Omarion and Deji LaRay |
| "When You Say" | 2017 | Jay 305 featuring Omarion | A Plus Filmz |
| "Nudes" | 2018 | Omarion | Omarion |
| "Tell Me" | 2018 | Anatii featuring Omarion | Omarion |
| "Get It Now" (Remix) | 2018 | Tiwa Savage featuring Omarion | Meji Alabi |
| "Open Up" | 2018 | Omarion | Omarion and Deji LaRay |
| "Lovely Day" | 2020 | Omarion | none |
| "Can You Hear Me" | 2020 | Omarion featuring T-Pain | Omarion |
| "Involved" | 2020 | Omarion | Omarion and Deji LaRay |
| "Do You Well | 2020 | Omarion | Omarion and Deji LaRay |
| "Mutual" | 2020 | Omarion featuring Wale | Omarion |

== See also ==
- B2K discography
