= 9 Lives (Kat DeLuna album) =

Studio album by Kat DeLuna
- Released: August 7, 2007
- Genre: Latin hip-hop; dancehall; R&B
- Length: 49:55
- Label: Epic
- Producer: RedOne

Kat DeLuna chronology
9 Lives (2007)	Inside Out (2010)

Singles from 9 Lives
- 1. "Whine Up" Released: May 15, 2007; 2. "Am I Dreaming" Released: August 28, 2007; 3. "Run the Show" Released: February 5, 2008; 4. "In the End" Released: October 30, 2008

9 Lives is the debut studio album by American singer Kat DeLuna. It was released in the United States on August 7, 2007. The album is a mix of R&B, pop, latin and dancehall influences. The album is mainly produced by RedOne, who at the time was unknown. Many of the songs on the album have a Hispanic feel, mainly the track Am I Dreaming. The album features guest appearances by artists such as Shaka Dee, Don Omar, Elephant Man and American rapper Busta Rhymes. DeLuna would later collaborate with Elephant Man yet again on her 2010 album, Inside Out.

9 Lives saw the release of three singles. The first of these, "Whine Up" featuring Elephant Man serving as a guest vocals, and has become DeLuna's biggest hit to date. It is, so far, her only single to chart on the Billboard Hot 100 in the US, where it peaked at number 29. In that country, the song became a smash hit over the Summer, topping the Hot Dance Club Play chart, as well as receiving heavy airplay on radio stations. It was also met with success in countries foreign to DeLuna, reaching the top 10 in France and Belgium. The single also had a large amount of success in countries such as Germany and Australia, peaking inside the Top 20 of both countries.

"Run the Show" was released as the second official single. The US version featured rapper Busta Rhymes, however, the international version featured Don Omar instead. The single has become one of DeLuna's highest-charting singles, as well as her first to enter the charts in the United Kingdom. Although it failed to chart on the Hot 100 in the United States, the single proved to be a big dance hit, peaking at number 2 on the Hot Dance Club Play chart. The final single from the album was "In the End", which was only released in certain territories, excluding the US and UK.

It debuted at number 58 on the US Billboard 200, selling 11,000 copies in its first week. It served better in foreign countries, reaching the top 20 in Belgium, Poland and Finland. In France, the album reached a peak of number 26, and later received a silver certification in the country.

== Background ==
At age 15, DeLuna entered a Coca-Cola sponsored karaoke competition. Her version of "I Will Always Love You" took first place. It was through this competition that she met Cuban salsa singer Rey Ruiz. Ruiz gave DeLuna this advice: "Nobody knows you better than you do, and nobody can help you if you can't help yourself." DeLuna began writing her own music and has continued to do so. In 2004, while DeLuna was 17, Coquette opened for a Cassidy concert in New Jersey. In 2006, DeLuna chose to pursue a solo career and was signed by Epic Records. After signing with the label, DeLuna met with producer RedOne, and the two would later collaborate on the majority of the album's tracks. DeLuna also met rapper Don Omar, who lent his vocals to the track, Run the Show. Shaka Dee and Busta Rhymes also collaborated on Run the Show, with the Don Omar version being released in the European edition of the album, the Shaka Dee version being released in Spanish territories, and the Busta Rhymes version being released in the United States. DeLuna also teamed up with Elephant Man on the track Whine Up, which received a worldwide release. The Konvict Musik Edition of the album also features Akon on the song, Am I Dreaming, which was originally performed as a solo song by DeLuna.

== Composition ==
The music found on the album is generally R&B and pop as well as dancehall, latin and hip hop. Throughout the album, Spanish influences are seen in the majority of the tracks. The album opens up with an intro, before proceeding into the next song. Following the intro is the album's second single, Run the Show. The version on the original release of the album features DeLuna singing the song by herself, however, there are multiple versions of the song which were released in various countries. The track sees DeLuna singing about commanding the dance floor. The following song is Am I Dreaming, which was initially going to be the album's second single. The song differs greatly from the dance nature of the previous track, with a more tropical beat taking over the song. The song sees DeLuna asking herself if she is dreaming, because the person she loves is so perfect. The fourth track on the album is the lead single, Whine Up. The dancehall track has DeLuna singing about a dance move, called the whine up. Both the album version and single version feature Elephant Man rapping a verse on the track. The fifth track on the album is Feel What I Feel. The song is more similar to Am I Dreaming, in the sense that both feature a soothing tropical melody. The track is mid-tempo, being one of the slowest songs on the album. Love Me or Leave Me is the sixth song on the album. The pop-ballad features DeLuna singing over a piano based beat, speaking of how one of the best to happen in her life was her ex leaving her.

The seventh song on the album is In the End, which also serves as the album's third and final single in certain European countries. The beat of the song is more edgy, featuring a guitar in the background. The track speaks of DeLuna having nothing left except for the one that she loves. Love Confusion is the eighth track on the album. The song has a trance-like beat, as DeLuna sings about being confused by the love she feels for someone. Animal serves as the ninth track on the album. The song is similar in tune to Whine Up, however, features heavy Spanish influence. Be Remembered, the tenth song on the album, features Shaka Dee on guest vocals. The mid-tempo dance track also sees DeLuna showing off her vocal skills. The song mainly speaks of everyone having their chance to shine, and be remembered. Enjoy Saying Goodbye is the eleventh song on the album, and final English song. The song begins as a ballad, however, slowly transitions into a more upbeat dance track. The final three tracks on the album are all Spanish versions of previously heard songs. The Spanish version of Whine Up is the twelfth song on the album, and is followed by Como Un Sueño, translating to Am I Dreaming in English. The fourteenth and final track is the Spanish version of Run the Show.

== Release ==
After the success of 9 Lives lead single, Whine Up, the album was quickly rushed for release. The album was first released in the United States and Canada, where it simultaneously was released on August 7, 2007 by Epic Records and Sony Music Entertainment. The following day, the album received a Japanese release, by Sony Music Japan. Due to DeLuna changing record labels, the album was not released in 2007 in any other territories. However, throughout the spring and summer of 2008, the album was released by Akon's music label Konvict Music. To make way for this edition in the United States, planned for July 29, 2008, the original album was removed from the U.S. and Japanese iTunes Stores. Due to the lackluster performance of "Run the Show", however, the re-release in the US never materialized. The original version remained also in Canada, while the Konvict Music Edition was released across Europe as well as in Australia, New Zealand and Japan (where both versions were released).

== Critical reception ==
Professional ratings
Review scores
Source	Rating
Allmusic	3.5/5 stars
Entertainment Weekly	B
PopMatters	8/10 stars
USA Today	2.5/4 stars
The Washington Post	B

Associated Press noted that "unlike most summer sizzlers who fizzle with the arrival of fall, Kat DeLuna should survive the season's dog days and beyond, thanks to her debut album 9 Lives. Songs such as "Am I Dreaming" and "Feel What I Feel" reveal what "Whine Up" only hints at: The bubbling, full voice of an artist with a pretty impressive singing range." PopMatters editor Matt Cibula found that with 9 Lives "DeLuna is not supposed to be any kind of big critical favorite. She’s not trying to impress us with her depth, her indie cred, or her awesome record collection. In fact, it actually seems like she and producer RedOne are only interested in turning good hooks and memorable choruses into pop songs for teenagers and other people who like their music to be "fun". Well, count me in. I love hooks, I love fun pop songs, and I love this record a whole freakin' lot."

AllMusic editor Andy Kellman rated the album three and a half ouf five stars. He found that 9 Lives "features credible streaks of dancehall, Latin pop, Euro-pop, modern R&B, freestyle, and yes, (albeit to a much lesser extent) opera as well. To DeLuna (who co-wrote everything) and her producer RedOne's credit, the album never quite sounds calculated or unnatural. While appealing multicultural/genre-crossing pop is nothing new, and a few tracks here are boilerplate and lack bite, DeLuna's controlled exuberance, ability to adapt to numerous styles, and considerable vocal ability keep it all afloat." Chris Richards, writing for The Washington Post, felt that DeLuna' "debut album packs as many sweets as a boardwalk concession stand. The singer's sweetest stuff harks back to the feel-good pop of Lisa Lisa." Entertainment Weekly's Jonathan Bernstein called the album a "surprisingly solid debut, which makes room for both dance-floor exhortations and bubblegum confections [and] singles out DeLuna as a more vocally gifted descendant of the Latin freestyle divas of the late '80s."

== Track listing ==
=== Original release ===
All songs are produced by RedOne.

No.	Title	Writer(s)	Length
1.	"9 Lives" (Intro)	Kat DeLuna; Nadir Khayat	1:06
2.	"Run the Show" (featuring Shaka Dee)	DeLuna; Khayat; Jane't Sewell-Ulepic; Shaka Dee	3:31
3.	"Am I Dreaming"	DeLuna; Khayat; Sewell-Ulepic	4:14
4.	"Whine Up" (featuring Elephant Man)	DeLuna; Tyrone Edmond; Khayat; Sewell-Ulepic	3:25
5.	"Feel What I Feel"	DeLuna; Khayat; Sewell-Ulepic	4:04
6.	"Love Me, Leave Me"	DeLuna; Maher Zain; Claude Kelly; Khayat	4:11
7.	"In the End"	DeLuna; Kelly; Khayat	3:23
8.	"Love Confusion"	DeLuna; Kelly; Khayat	4:02
9.	"Animal"	DeLuna; Khayat; Sewell-Ulepic	3:23
10.	"Be Remembered" (featuring Shaka Dee)	DeLuna; Khayat; Sewell-Ulepic; Dee	3:37
11.	"Enjoy Saying Goodbye"	DeLuna; Andrea Martin; Khayat	4:05
12.	"Whine Up" (Spanish Version; featuring Elephant Man) (bonus track)	DeLuna; Edmond; Khayat; Sewell-Ulepic	3:25
13.	"Como un Sueño" (Spanish Version of "Am I Dreaming") (bonus track)	DeLuna; Khayat; Sewell-Ulepic	3:59
14.	"Aqui Estoy" (Spanish Version of "Run the Show"; featuring Don Omar) (bonus track)	DeLuna; Khayat; Sewell-Ulepic; Dee	3:30
Total length:			49:55

Japanese bonus tracks
No.	Title	Length
15.	"How We Roll" (featuring Shaka Dee)	3:41
16.	"You Are Only Mine"	3:30
Total length:		52:39

=== Konvict Musik edition ===
No.	Title	Writer(s)	Length
1.	"9 Lives" (Intro)		1:08
2.	"Run the Show" (featuring Busta Rhymes)		3:31
3.	"Am I Dreaming" (featuring Akon)		3:58
4.	"Feel What I Feel"		4:04
5.	"Whine Up" (featuring Elephant Man)		3:25
6.	"Love Me, Leave Me"		4:11
7.	"In the End"		3:23
8.	"Love Confusion"		4:02
9.	"Animal"		3:23
10.	"You Are Only Mine"		3:30
11.	"Enjoy Saying Goodbye"		4:05
12.	"Whine Up" (En Español; featuring Elephant Man) (bonus track)		3:25
13.	"Aqui Estoy" (Spanish Version of "Run the Show"; featuring Don Omar) (bonus track)	DeLuna; Khayat; Sewell-Ulepic; Dee	3:30
14.	"Como un Sueño" (Spanish Version of "Am I Dreaming") (bonus track)	DeLuna; Khayat; Sewell-Ulepic	3:59

Japanese bonus track
No.	Title	Length
15.	"Cut Off Time" (Omarion featuring Kat DeLuna)	3:25

Japanese limited edition bonus DVD
No.	Title	Length
1.	"Run the Show" (music video; featuring Busta Rhymes)
2.	"Whine Up" (music video; featuring Elephant Man)

== Charts ==
=== Weekly charts ===
Weekly chart performance for 9 Lives
Chart (2007–08)	Peak position
Austrian Albums (Ö3 Austria)	64
Belgian Albums (Ultratop Flanders)	16
Belgian Albums (Ultratop Wallonia)	22
Finnish Albums (Suomen virallinen lista)	15
French Albums (SNEP)	26
German Albums (Offizielle Top 100)	73
Polish Albums (ZPAV)	12
Swiss Albums (Schweizer Hitparade)	49
US Billboard 200	58

=== Year-end charts ===
Year-end chart performance for 9 Lives
Chart (2008)	Position
Belgian Albums (Ultratop Flanders)	55
French Albums (SNEP)	128

== Release history ==
Release history and formats for 9 Lives
Region	Date	Label	Edition(s)
United States	August 7, 2007	Epic Records	Standard edition
Canada	August 7, 2007	Sony Music Entertainment	Standard edition
Japan	August 8, 2007	Sony Music Japan	Standard edition
France	April 21, 2008	Universal Music Group	Konvict Musik Edition
Singapore	May 1, 2008	Universal Music Group	Konvict Musik Edition
Germany	July 25, 2008	Universal Music Group	Konvict Musik Edition
[Australia	September 29, 2008	Universal Music Group	Konvict Musik Edition
Poland	September 8, 2008	Universal Music Group	Konvict Musik Edition
