= Whine Up =

2007 Single by Kat DeLuna featuring Elephant Man

Single by Kat DeLuna featuring Elephant Man

from the album 9 Lives
- Released: May 15, 2007
- Length: 3:25
- Label: Epic
- Songwriters: Kat DeLuna; Nadir Khayat; Jane't Sewell-Ulepic; O'Neil Bryan; Tyrone Edmond
- Producer: RedOne

Kat DeLuna singles chronology
| "Whine Up" (2007) | "Am I Dreaming" (2007) |

Elephant Man singles chronology
| "Five-O" (2007) | "Whine Up" (2007) | "Willie Bounce" (2007) |

"Whine Up" is the debut single by American singer Kat DeLuna, released from her debut album, 9 Lives. The song features Elephant Man. It was believed that Puerto Rican rapper Ivy Queen was featured, but DeLuna herself provided the rap. The song earned DeLuna a Billboard Latin Music Award for "Latin Dance Club Play Track Of The Year." The title comes from the Caribbean English (West Indian) pronunciation of wind up meaning to move one's hips on the dance floor. The song became a top 10 hit in France and Romania.

== Music video ==
DeLuna had asked fans that live in the New York City area to send in a video of them dancing on her song so they might win the opportunity to be featured in the music video for the song.

The video (directed by Gil Green) premiered via her MySpace page. It starts with DeLuna singing the introduction of Dulcissime, from Carl Orff's Carmina Burana for her friend, when she is suddenly interrupted by the tune of her song, at which point she performs the song and dances. The song is accompanied by her dance, The Whine Up. The video premiered on MTV's TRL on July 26, 2007 and was on the countdown for 31 days, peaking at #2. The video features future Dance Central choreographer Marcos Aguirre who later choreographed the same song as DLC for its sequel.

== Chart performance ==
The song was released to mainstream radio in the United States on May 15, 2007. The song debuted at number 24 on Billboard's Bubbling Under Hot 100 Singles chart and went on to peak at number 29 on the Hot 100. The song has had over 500,000 legal downloads in the U.S. and was certified Gold on February 13, 2008. "Whine Up" peaked at number nine on the French charts.

== Promotions and performances ==
DeLuna performed "Whine Up", alongside two back-up dancers, at the Miss Teen USA 2007 pageant which aired August 24, 2007 on NBC. Her performance accompanied the top 15 swimsuit competition.

DeLuna recorded a version of "Whine Up" for the 2007 New York Mets and performed this version at Shea Stadium, home field for the Mets.

== Other song performances and versions ==
The song was used as the theme music for WWE's SummerSlam 2007 pay-per-view wrestling event.

The song has been featured in or associated with two films: It was featured in the trailer for the film Feel the Noise (2007) starring Omarion, and was included on the soundtrack for the direct-to-video film Bring it On: Fight to the Finish (2009).

Actor/U.S. Army Iraq War Veteran J.R. Martinez and professional dancer Karina Smirnoff, winners of the 13th U.S. version of Dancing with the Stars, received a perfect score (30/30) for their freestyle dance that was set to "Whine Up". Their choreography was centered around Afro-Cuban reggaeton rhythms and associated with dance moves.

== Track listing and formats ==
French CD single

1. English Album Version 3:25
2. Johnny Vicious Club Drama Mix 7:30

French CD promo single

1. Whine Up 3:25

German CD maxi-single

1. English Album Version 3:25
2. Johnny Vicious Club Drama Mix 7:30

German enhanced CD maxi-single

1. Whine Up 3:25
2. Vicious Radio Mix 3:21
3. Johnny Vicious Club Drama Mix 7:30
4. Video

Australian CD maxi-single

1. Whine Up 3:25
2. Vicious Radio Mix 3:21
3. Johnny Vicious Club Drama Mix 7:30
4. Video

U.S. CD ringle

1. Album Version 3:25
2. En Español 3:25
3. Johnny Vicious Mix Show 5:13

U.S. CD maxi-single

1. En Español 3:25
2. English Version 3:25
3. Bilingual Version 3:25

U.S. CD promo maxi-single

1. Whine Up 3:22

U.S. CD promo single (remixes)

1. Party Club Drama 4:26
2. Party Mixshow Drama 5:31
3. Warehouse Mix Acid Dub 4:21
4. Club Mix Spanish Vocals 4:26
5. Party Radio 3:18
6. Radio Mix Spanish Vocals 3:18

U.S. EP

1. Johnny Vicious Club Drama Mix 7:30
2. Johnny Vicious Mix Show 5:34
3. Johnny Vicious Warehouse Acid Dub Mix 7:26
4. Album Version 3:25
5. Johnny Vicious Spanish Mix 3:17

== Release history ==
| Region | Date | Format(s) | Label | Ref. |
|---|---|---|---|---|
| United States | May 1, 2007 | Rhythmic radio | Epic | |
| United States | May 15, 2007 | Contemporary hit radio | Epic | |
| United States | November 6, 2007 | Ringle | Epic | |
| France | November 24, 2007 | Digital download | Sony BMG | |
| France | November 26, 2007 | CD single | Sony BMG | |
| Australia | February 4, 2008 | CD single | Sony BMG | |

== Charts ==
=== Weekly charts ===
| Chart (2007–08) | Peak position |
|---|---|
| Australia (ARIA) | 18 |
| Austria (Ö3 Austria Top 40) | 65 |
| Belgium (Ultratop 50 Flanders) | 6 |
| Belgium (Ultratop 50 Wallonia) | 7 |
| Canada Hot 100 (Billboard) | 15 |
| CIS Airplay (TopHit) | 55 |
| France (SNEP) | 9 |
| Germany (GfK) | 24 |
| Netherlands (Single Top 100) | 71 |
| Romania (Romanian Top 100) | 4 |
| Switzerland (Schweizer Hitparade) | 49 |
| US Billboard Hot 100 | 29 |
| US Dance Club Songs (Billboard) | 1 |
| US Hot Latin Songs (Billboard) | 43 |
| US Pop Airplay (Billboard) | 14 |

=== Year-end charts ===
| Chart (2007) | Position |
|---|---|
| US Dance Club Songs (Billboard) | 41 |

| Chart (2008) | Position |
|---|---|
| Belgium (Ultratop 50 Flanders) | 35 |
| Belgium (Ultratop 50 Wallonia) | 20 |
| France (SNEP) | 76 |

=== Certifications ===
| Region | Certification | Certified units/sales |
|---|---|---|
| Canada (Music Canada) Ringtone | Gold | 20,000^{*} |
| United States (RIAA) | Gold | 500,000^{*} |
^{*} Sales figures based on certification alone.

== See also ==
- Number-one dance hits of 2007 (USA)
- Phonological history of wh
