= Speeding (disambiguation) =

Speeding refers to exceeding the speed limit

Speedin' may refer to:

- Speeding (album), an album by Allday
- "Speeding", a song by Steve Vai from the album Mystery Tracks – Archives Vol. 3
- "Speeding", a song by Lights from the album Little Machines
- "Speedin'", song by The Medallions 1955
- Speedin', song by Rick Ross 2007
- Speedin' (Omarion song)
