= Run the Show =

Single by Kat DeLuna featuring Busta Rhymes or Don Omar

from the album 9 Lives
- Released: January 15, 2008
- Genre: Hip hop; reggaeton; R&B
- Length: 3:35
- Label: Epic
- Songwriters: Kat DeLuna; Nadir Khayat; Jane't Sewell-Ulepic; Shaka Dee
- Producer: RedOne

Kat DeLuna singles chronology
"Cut Off Time" (2007)	"Run the Show" (2008)	"Breathing Your Love" (2008)

Busta Rhymes singles chronology
"Hurt" (2007)	"Run the Show" (2007)	"Don't Touch Me (Throw da Water on 'Em)" (2008)

Don Omar singles chronology
"Canción De Amor" (2007)	"Run the Show" (2007)	"Virtual Diva" (2009)

"Run the Show" is a song by American singer Kat DeLuna from her debut studio album 9 Lives. It was released as the second worldwide single off her debut album. While the album version features vocals from Shaka Dee, the single version features a new rap from Busta Rhymes. It was officially sent to big radio stations on January 15, 2008. The Spanish version features reggaeton artist Don Omar.

== Chart performance ==
The song was being rotated on U.S. radio stations in the week from December 5–11 and debuted at number 182 of the most played songs in American radios. Currently it has peaked at number 45. It debuted on z100 December 20, 2007, and has received considerable airplay. The song debuted at #88 on the Pop 100 and #50, and on the Pop 100 Airplay. The song was released digitally in the United States on February 5, 2008. The Spanish single version was later released on March 11, 2008.

The song was released on March 17, 2008 in France.

On June 2, 2008, the single debuted at #41 on the UK Singles Chart on downloads alone. For a time it had regular airplay on UK music channels and radio stations but the song failed to chart any higher than number 41 due to a lack of promotion.

The song was released in Germany on October 31, 2008.

== Music video ==
The music video for "Run the Show" featuring Busta Rhymes premiered on Thursday, March 13, 2008 at her website, while the video featuring Don Omar premiered on Friday, March 21, 2008 at Mun2 on Pepsi Musica. Both videos were directed by Ray Kay.

== Critical reception ==
"Run the Show" was voted 972 in TOPradio's "Dance Top 1000" songs.

== Covers and Samples ==
Britney Spears sampled the song in her single "Break the Ice" as video interlude during her 2009 The Circus Starring: Britney Spears tour.

== Track listings ==
Digital download

1. "Run the Show" - 3:33

Promo CD

1. "Run the Show" - 3:33
2. "Run the Show" (Instrumentall) - 3:35

Run the Show (iTunes Digital Remixes) - EP

1. "Run the Show (Radio Mix)" - 3:41
2. "Run the Show" (Club Vocal Up) - 8:16
3. "Run the Show" (Club Dub) - 7:26
4. "Run the Show" (Ashanti Boyz remix) - 3:35
5. "Run the Show" (Warehouse Mix) - 6:46

== Charts ==
=== Weekly charts ===
Chart (2008)	Peak position
Belgium (Ultratop 50 Flanders)	5
Belgium (Ultratop 50 Wallonia)	5
Finland (Suomen virallinen lista)	2
France (SNEP)	6
Germany (GfK)	73
Hungary (Editors' Choice Top 40)	33
Ireland (IRMA)	26
Romania (Romanian Top 100)	15
Switzerland (Schweizer Hitparade)	29
Sweden (Sverigetopplistan)	18
UK Singles (Official Charts)	41
US Bubbling Under Hot 100 (Billboard)	17
US Dance Club Songs (Billboard)	2
US Pop 100 (Billboard)	63

=== Year-end charts ===
Charts (2008)	Position
Belgium (Ultratop 50 Flanders)	32
Belgium (Ultratop 50 Wallonia)	52
France (SNEP)	27

== Sales and certifications ==
Certifications for Run the Show
Region	Certification	Certified units/sales
Finland (Musiikkituottajat)	Gold	5,113

== Release history ==
Region	Date	Format(s)	Version(s)	Label	Ref.
United States	January 15, 2008	Mainstream radio; rhythm/crossover radio	Busta Rhymes	Epic	
United States	March 11, 2008	Digital download	Don Omar	Epic	
United States	April 14, 2008	Digital download	Remixes	Epic	
United Kingdom	May 19, 2008	Digital download	Busta Rhymes	Sony BMG	
United Kingdom	June 2, 2008	Digital download	A cappella	Sony BMG	
Germany	October 24, 2008	Digital download	Busta Rhymes; Instrumental	Sony BMG	
Germany	October 31, 2008	CD single	Busta Rhymes; Instrumental	Sony BMG	
