= In the End (Kat DeLuna song) =

Single by Kat DeLuna

from the album 9 Lives
- Released: October 30, 2008
- Genre: Dance-pop; R&B
- Length: 3:24
- Label: Epic, Sony BMG
- Songwriters: Kat DeLuna; Claude Kelly; Nadir Khayat
- Producer: RedOne

Kat DeLuna singles chronology
"Breathing Your Love" (2008)	"In the End" (2008)	"Unstoppable" (2009)

"In the End" is a song by American singer and songwriter Kat DeLuna. It was released as the fourth single from her debut solo studio album, "9 Lives", on October 30, 2008.

== Background ==
"In the End" was included on DeLuna's debut album, "9 Lives". It was produced by RedOne and was written by DeLuna, RedOne and Claude Kelly.

== Music video ==
The music video was filmed in mid-2008 and was released via her official YouTube page on October 31, 2008. It depicts DeLuna singing and dancing in front of a white and stripped background, wearing various outfits. The video is intercut with scenes of her performing the song with a microphone.

== Track listings ==
Digital download

1. "In the End" - 3:23

== Credits and personnel ==
Credits adapted from "9 Lives" CD album liner notes.

- Kat DeLuna - vocals, writer
- RedOne – producer, writer, guitars, instruments and programming
- Claude Kelly – writer
- Orlando Calzada - mixer
- AUMStudios – mixing location

== Charts ==
Chart (2008)	Peak position
Belgium (Ultratop 50 Flanders)	31
Belgium (Ultratip Bubbling Under Wallonia)	2
