= BET Awards 2005 =

American entertainment awards ceremony

5th BET Awards
- Date: June 28, 2005
- Location: Kodak Theatre, Los Angeles, California
- Presented by: Black Entertainment Television
- Hosted by: Will Smith; Jada Pinkett Smith
- Most wins: Kanye West (2)
- Most nominations: Ciara (4)

Television/radio coverage
- Network: BET

The 5th BET Awards took place at the Kodak Theatre in Los Angeles, California on June 28, 2005. The awards recognized Americans in music, acting, sports, and other fields of entertainment over the past year. Actors Will Smith and Jada Pinkett Smith hosted the event for the first time.

American singer Ciara led the nominations with four, followed by John Legend, Kanye West and Destiny's Child with three nominations each. Gladys Knight was honored with the Lifetime Achievement Award, and actor Denzel Washington and his wife Pauletta Pearson received the Humanitarian Award.

During the ceremony, it was also reported by BET News that R&B singer Luther Vandross died at 11pm.

== Presenters ==
- Halle Berry - presented Best Group
- Terrence Howard & Eva Pigford - presented Best Male R&B Artist
- Nelly & Gabrielle Union - presented Best New Artist
- Tom Cruise - presented Best Actor
- Queen Latifah & Anthony Anderson - presented Best Male R&B Artist
- Mario, Nick Cannon & Amerie - presented Best Male Hip-Hop Artist
- Wu Tang Clan - Paid tribute to ODB
- Henry Simmons & Meagan Good - presented Best Actress
- Tito Jackson
- Steve Harvey - presented Gladys Knight tribute with Faith Evans and Toni Braxton
- Alicia Keys - presented Gladys Knight with the Lifetime Achievement Award
- Isaiah Washington - Paid tribute to Ossie Davis
- Teena Marie - Paid tribute to Rick James

== Performances ==
- The Fugees - "Ready or Not", "Fu-Gee-La", and "Killing Me Softly"
- Missy Elliott featuring Ciara and Fatman Scoop - "Lose Control"
- The Game featuring Mary J. Blige - "Dreams" and "Hate It or Love It"
- Destiny's Child - "Cater 2 U"
- John Legend ft. Stevie Wonder - "Ordinary People" and "My Cherie Amour"
- T.I. featuring P$C and Sheila E. - "U Don't Know Me" and "Bring Em Out"
- Mariah Carey - "We Belong Together"
- Gladys Knight Lifetime Achievement Tribute:
  - Faith Evans - "Love Overboard"
  - Toni Braxton - "Save the Overtime (For Me)" and "Best Thing That Ever Happened to Me"
- Gladys Knight - Lifetime Achievement Award performance: "If I Were Your Woman", "Neither One of Us (Wants to Be the First to Say Goodbye)" and "Midnight Train to Georgia"
- Omarion - "O" and "Touch"
- Ciara ft. Ludacris - "Oh" and "1, 2 Step"
- Mike Jones featuring Slim Thug and Paul Wall - "Back Then" and "Still Tippin'"
- Stevie Wonder - "So What the Fuss" and "Happy Birthday"

== Awards and nominations ==
All nominees are listed below, and the winners are listed in bold.

Video of the Year

- **Kanye West for "Jesus Walks"**
  - Amerie for "1 Thing"
  - Jay Z for "99 Problems"
  - John Legend for "Ordinary People"
  - Snoop Dogg for "Drop It Like It's Hot" featuring Pharrell Williams

Viewer's Choice

- **Omarion for "O"**
  - Destiny's Child for "Soldier" featuring Lil Wayne and T.I.
  - Ciara for "1, 2 Step" featuring Missy Elliott
  - Mario for "Let Me Love You"
  - Terror Squad for "Lean Back" featuring Fat Joe and Remy Ma
  - T.I. for "U Don't Know Me"

Best Collaboration

- **Ciara for "1, 2 Step" featuring Missy Elliott**
  - Usher for "My Boo" featuring Alicia Keys
  - Snoop Dogg for "Drop It Like It's Hot" featuring Pharrell Williams
  - Jadakiss for "Why" featuring Anthony Hamilton
  - The Game for "Hate It or Love It" featuring 50 Cent
  - Destiny's Child for "Soldier" featuring Lil Wayne and T.I.

Best New Artist

- **John Legend**
  - Fantasia
  - The Game
  - Ciara
  - Omarion

Best Group

- **Destiny's Child**
  - 112
  - Terror Squad
  - Lil Jon and the East Side Boyz
  - The Roots

Best Gospel Artist

- **Donnie McClurkin**
  - Ruben Studdard
  - Fred Hammond
  - CeCe Winans
  - Kanye West

Best Female Hip-Hop Artist

- **Remy Ma**
  - Jacki-O
  - Miri Ben-Ari
  - Shawnna

Best Male Hip-Hop Artist

- **Kanye West**
  - 50 Cent
  - Jay Z
  - Ludacris
  - Snoop Dogg
  - T.I.

Best Female R&B Artist

- **Alicia Keys**
  - Jill Scott
  - Amerie
  - Mariah Carey
  - Ciara
  - Fantasia

Best Male R&B Artist

- **Usher**
  - Anthony Hamilton
  - John Legend
  - Mario
  - Prince

Best Actress

- **Regina King**
  - Queen Latifah
  - Kimberly Elise
  - Gabrielle Union
  - Halle Berry

Best Actor

- **Jamie Foxx**
  - Morgan Freeman
  - Mos Def
  - Don Cheadle
  - Will Smith

Best Female Athlete of the Year

- **Serena Williams**
  - Gail Devers
  - Lisa Leslie
  - Venus Williams
  - Laila Ali

Best Male Athlete of the Year

- **Shaquille O'Neal**
  - Tiger Woods
  - LeBron James
  - Donovan McNabb
  - Allen Iverson

Lifetime Achievement Award

- **Gladys Knight**

Humanitarian Award

- **Denzel Washington and Pauletta Washington**
