= Cut Off Time =

Single by Omarion featuring Kat DeLuna

from the album Feel the Noise
- Released: September 11, 2007
- Recorded: 2007
- Genre: Hip hop; dance; R&B
- Length: 4:43
- Label: Epic
- Songwriters: Tim Mosley; John Spivery; Solomon Logan; Keri Hilson; Ezekiel Lewis; Patrick Smith
- Producers: Timbaland; The Royal Court

Omarion singles chronology
"Ice Box" (2006)	"Cut Off Time" (2007)	"Girlfriend" (2007)

Kat DeLuna singles chronology
"Am I Dreaming" (2007)	"Cut Off Time" (2007)	"Run the Show" (2008)

"Cut Off Time" is a single by American R&B singer Omarion featuring American singer Kat DeLuna. Omarion had recorded a track with Kat DeLuna, which later became added in the soundtrack for the 2007 film Feel the Noise.

== Track listings ==
Digital download

1. "Cut Off Time" – 3:24

Promo CD

1. "Cut Off Time" – 3:24
2. "Cut Off Time" (a cappella) – 3:23
3. "Cut Off Time" (instrumental) – 3:27

== Charts ==
Chart (2007)	Peak position
US Bubbling Under R&B/Hip-Hop Singles	23

== Release history ==
Region	Date
United States	September 11, 2007
