= Am I Dreaming (Kat DeLuna song) =

2007 single by Kat DeLuna

Single by Kat DeLuna

from the album 9 Lives
- Released: 28 August 2007
- Recorded: 2007
- Genre: Bachata; reggae; R&B
- Length: 4:14 (Album version); 3:58 (Single edit); 3:58 (Spanish version)
- Label: Epic
- Songwriters: Kat DeLuna; Nadir Khayat; Jane't Sewell-Ulepic
- Producer: RedOne

Kat DeLuna singles chronology
"Whine Up" (2007)	"Am I Dreaming" (2007)	"Cut Off Time" (2007)

Akon singles chronology
"Sweetest Girl (Dollar Bill)" (2007)	"Am I Dreaming" (2007)	"Hypnotized" (2007)

"Am I Dreaming" is a song recorded by American singer Kat DeLuna. It was officially released on August 28, 2007, as the second single from DeLuna's debut studio album, 9 Lives (2007). The music video for "Am I Dreaming" was filmed in the Zona Colonial district of Dominican Republic. "Am I Dreaming" incorporates the styles of bachata and reggae, while showcasing DeLuna's soprano abilities. The official remix features the singer Akon. "Am I Dreaming" was produced by RedOne and written by DeLuna, RedOne and Jane't Sewell-Ulepic.

== Background ==
"Am I Dreaming" was written by Kat DeLuna, RedOne and Jane't Sewell-Ulepic. RedOne also produced the song and DeLuna recorded it at 333 Studios in New York City. The song was produced for DeLuna's debut album 9 Lives and was promoted as the second single from the album. Senegalese-American singer Akon features on a remixed version of the song. DeLuna later recalled that she was "fortunate" to work with a musician of his calibre.

"Am I Dreaming" incorporates the bachata music style that originated from the Dominican Republic, where DeLuna grew up. DeLuna told Yanuarys Lopez from The Palm Beach Post that along with bachata, includes elements of reggae and opera. DeLuna wanted to include elements of opera in the song because she is a soprano singer. She added that she was unique being the first soprano, pop and dance music artist. "Am I Dreaming" received an official release on 12-inch vinyl which was released on August 28, 2007.

== Music video ==
The official music video for "Am I Dreaming" was filmed in Zona Colonial in Santo Domingo, the singer's Caribbean hometown. In the video DeLuna performs some bachata dance routines for her fans to learn. She told Diego Graglia from New York Daily News that "I wanna show people how to dance bachata." On August 23, 2007, DeLuna announced that the video was nearly completed and was supposed to be released thereafter.

== Critical reception ==
Melanie Sims from The Times and Democrat opined that "Am I Dreaming" and "Feel What I Feel" showcased DeLuna's vocal abilities. She added it displayed "the bubbling voice of an artist with a pretty impressive singing range." New York Daily News's Graglia stated that bachata "tinges" the track and gave it a "romantic Caribbean hue". Steve Jones from The Times branded the track a "merengue-tinged ballad". In a review on 9 Lives printed in the Daily Record, "Am I Dreaming" was chosen as one of the album's two best tracks to download. Elysa Gardner from Gannett News branded "Am I Dreaming" as one of the album's "standout tracks". Joey Guerra from Sony Music described it as a "buoyed by a lilting, beach-kissed groove."

== Track listings ==
Digital download

1. "Am I Dreaming" – 4:17

Remix digital download

1. "Am I Dreaming" (Feat. Akon) – 3:58

12-inch vinyl

1. "Am I Dreaming" (Album Version) – 4:14
2. "Como Un Sueno" (Am I Dreaming) En Espanol – 3:58
3. "Am I Dreaming" (Instrumentalla) – 3:58
4. "Am I Dreaming" (Acapella) – 3:59

== Credits and personnel ==
Credits adapted from "9 Lives" CD album liner notes.

- Kat DeLuna - vocals, writer
- RedOne – producer, background vocals, writer, instruments and programming
- Jane't Sewell-Ulepic – writer
- Maher – background vocals
- Eric Rivera – guitars
- Orlando Calzada - mixer
- AUMStudios – mixing location

== Charts ==
Chart performance for "Am I Dreaming"
Chart (2017)	Peak position
US Tropical Songs (Billboard)	26

== Release history ==
Release history and formats for "Am I Dreaming"
Region	Date	Format	Label	Ref.
United States	August 28, 2007	LP	Epic	
