= The Millennium Tour =

2019–21 concert tour by B2K

- Tour by Omarion
- Location: North America • Canada • United Kingdom
- Start date: March 8, 2019
- End date: May 4, 2025 (2025 dates)
- Legs: 8
- No. of shows: 236 in North America; 11 in Canada; 2 in The United Kingdom; 249 in total (Note: All numbers, including North America dates, Canada dates, United Kingdom dates, and total dates are counting the planned dates for the 2025 leg.)
- Box office: over $28 million (Note: The total grossing amount for every leg is unknown. The only amount that has ever been released was for the 1st leg of the tour (2019) which brought in $28 million.)

The Millennium Tour is a recurring concert tour headlining some of the early 2000s hottest artists. The tour, which comes around once a year, is known to have multiple guest performers; most notably Omarion (2019-present), Bobby V (2019; 2022-present), and Bow Wow (2019-present).

== 2019 ==
When 2019 dates were announced they were promoted as B2K being the main headliner with Mario, Pretty Ricky, Lloyd, Bobby V, Ying Yang Twins and Chingy as an opening acts for different dates. The tour became one of the year’s most successful new concert experiences grossing over $28 million.

== 2020-2021 ==
However, in 2020 new dates were announced and all members of B2K had removed from the lineup except Omarion. It was later announced that Omarion would be continuing The Millennium Tour without his bandmates and with Bow Wow as the new co-headliner. Other acts including Ashanti, Sammie and Soulja Boy being added to 2020 dates as opening acts.

Zeus Network later announced a partnership with Omarion to release The Millennium Tour Live Concert featuring B2K. The Millennium Tour Live was set to premiere on Sunday, April 12, 2020 at 8PM EST / 5PM PST exclusively on the Zeus Network. However, in August 2020, controversy surrounding the documentary arose. It was reported that Omarion filed a lawsuit against the company accusing them of withholding unaired footage from the film.

The group was nominated for Top R&B Tour at the 2020 Billboard Music Awards.

The tour was postponed due to the COVID-19 pandemic and plans were set for continued performance dates in 2021 scheduled for October 1.

The tour resumed as planned on October 1, 2021 and was later nominated for another award in the category of Best R&B Tour at the 33rd Pollstar Awards. Following the death of Young Dolph, G-Squared Events announced that it has dropped Soulja Boy from the Millennium Tour stops in Memphis and St. Louis following their backlash online on his comments about Young Dolph.

== 2022 ==
The Millennium Tour earned two more nominations at the 2022 Billboard Music Awards for "Top R&B Tour" and "Top Rap Tour", winning the latter alongside Bow Wow.

On July 11, 2022, it was announced that a United Kingdom tour date from 2021 had been rescheduled and updated to August 10, 2022 at The O2 London.

On August 12, 2022, North American tour dates were announced under the new moniker The Millennium Tour: Turned Up! with the lineup consisting of Bow Wow, Mario, Keri Hilson as headliners along with Lloyd, Pleasure P, Bobby V, Sammie, Ying Yang Twins, Chingy, Dem Franchise Boyz, Lil Scrappy, Travis Porter, Crime Mob and Trillville joining. A Day 26 reunion was also announced. The tour is scheduled to commence on October 7 in Hampton, Virginia, and conclude November 27 in Oakland.

=== Reception ===
Darlene White of Detroit Metro Times praised Bow Wow for overcoming the odds of technical difficulties and reflected by repping the Air Jordan 2s during the Detroit stop, quoted that, "it was a blast from the past and a night to remember how old you really are."

== 2025 ==
In November 20, 2024, it was announced that The Millennium Tour would be returning in 2025 with Omarion, Bow Wow and Trey Songz co-headlining.

Other confirmed acts include Plies, Boosie and Ying Yang Twins. Supergroup RSVP (featuring Ray J, Sammie, Bobby V and Pleasure P) will also perform, along with Nivea and special guest Rick Ross.

The tour is scheduled to kick off March 7 in Louisville, Kentucky at KFC Yum! Center.
