= BDY On Me =

Promotional single by Omarion
- Released: February 3, 2017
- Length: 3:41
- Label: Atlantic
- Songwriters: Christopher Dotson; Lynniah Herron
- Producers: J Maine; Cisco

"BDY On Me" (meaning "Body On Me") is a song by American R&B recording artist Omarion. The record is produced by J Maine and co-produced by Cisco. It was released online February 3, 2017.

== Background ==
Omarion first previewed the song on his Instagram account in February 2017. The pre-chorus of the song interpolates "Too Close" by the group Next.

== Music video ==
The music video premiered on February 3, 2017 on YouTube and was shot in Cape Town, South Africa.
