= Shaka Dee =

Shaka Dee hails from the country of Trinidad & Tobago. Prior to starting his music career, he played soccer in his native country. In 2002 she made a big hit called run the show featuring Busta Rhymes in North Carolina. Then in 2005, Shaka Dee, Kat DeLuna and Jay Millz collaborated on the single "Dale Duro". It was ranked number one throughout Europe and Japan. With the success of the single, Shaka became the opening act at shows in the United Kingdom, Germany, Netherlands and Italy. He began a series of collaborations, most recently with Kat DeLuna.

"Run the Show" and "To Be Remembered", which debuted on 8 August 2007. He appeared in Kat DeLuna's first official music video Whine Up. Shaka is working on his new single with producer Mark Holiday also known as "Trendsetter".
