= Girlfriend (Bow Wow and Omarion song) =

Single by Bow Wow and Omarion

from the album Face Off
- Released: October 12, 2007
- Recorded: 2007
- Genre: Hip hop, R&B
- Length: 4:44
- Label: Sony BMG Music Entertainment
- Songwriter(s): Joel Bowles, Omari Grandberry, Shad Gregory Moss, Terius Nash, John Hosea Williams
- Producer(s): Don Vito, Cheese

Bow Wow and Omarion singles chronology
"Let Me Hold You" (2005)	"Girlfriend" (2007)	"Hey Baby (Jump Off)" (2007)

Bow Wow singles chronology
"Easy" (2007)	"Girlfriend" (2007)	"Hey Baby (Jump Off)" (2008)

Omarion singles chronology
"Cut Off Time" (2007)	"Girlfriend" (2007)	"Hey Baby (Jump Off)" (2008)

"Girlfriend" is the first single from the collaborative album Face Off by rapper Bow Wow and R&B singer Omarion. The music video for "Girlfriend" starts off with a song titled "Can't Get Tired" playing in the background before "Girlfriend" begins. "Can't Get Tired" is also from their album Face Off.

The single was released to iTunes on October 30. The single debuted on the Billboard Hot 100 at number 82 and peaked at number 33.

This is the second song under the name "Girlfriend" that Omarion has recorded, following his previous song from 2003 as a member of B2K.

== Remix ==
The official remix to the song features Swizz Beatz, Cassidy and Soulja Boy Tell 'Em with production by Swizz Beatz & the Individualz.

== Charts ==
=== Weekly charts ===
Chart (2007)	Peak position
US Billboard Hot 100	33
US Hot R&B/Hip-Hop Songs (Billboard)	20
US Rhythmic (Billboard)	6

=== Year-end charts ===
Chart (2008)	Position
US Hot R&B/Hip-Hop Songs (Billboard)	77

== Certifications ==
Certification for "Girlfriend"
Region	Certification	Certified units/sales
New Zealand (RMNZ)	Gold	15,000^{‡}
^{‡} Sales+streaming figures based on certification alone.
