= Ringle =

CD music format

In music publishing, a ringle was an attempt to revitalize the CD market by bundling a song in both full single form and a shortened ringtone version on the same disc.

Conceived by Sony BMG Music Entertainment, a 'ringle' consisted of three songs, including the advertised single along with a remix or possibly another song from the same artist, as well as a mobile phone ringtone and a program allowing the purchaser to transfer the ringtone to their mobile phone. Sony BMG stated that 50 ringles would be released between October and November 2007 in the USA, while Universal Music Group would release up to 20. Bloggers at the time likened the move to "re-arranging the deck chairs on the Titanic", while the Sydney Morning Herald stated the concept "could be a case of too little, too late."
