= Scream Tour IV =

2005 concert tour

The Scream Tour IV (also referred to as Scream Tour IV: The HeartThrobs) was a summer 2005 concert tour featuring Bow Wow, Omarion, Marques Houston, B5, Pretty Ricky and Bobby Valentino. It was an installment in the Scream Tour series, sponsored by BET. Performances by Pretty Ricky were considered by many online critics to be oversexualized, with the members in erotic positions and during some performances in their underwear. Footage from this show was filmed and released on DVD as a live album titled Scream Tour IV: Heartthrobs Live.

== Tour dates ==
Date	City	Country	Venue
July 20, 2005	Trenton	United States	Sovereign Bank Arena
July 21, 2005	Bridgeport	United States	Arena at Harbor Yard
July 23, 2005	Hampton	United States	Hampton Coliseum
July 24, 2005	Baltimore	United States	1st Mariner Arena
July 27, 2005	Cleveland	United States	Wolstein Center
July 28, 2005	Columbus	United States	Value City Arena
July 29, 2005	Detroit	United States	Cobo Arena
July 30, 2005	Champaign	United States	Assembly Hall
July 31, 2005	St. Louis	United States	Savvis Center
August 3, 2005	Las Vegas	United States	Orleans Arena
August 4, 2005	Los Angeles	United States	Gibson Amphitheatre
August 6, 2005	Oakland	United States	Oakland Arena
August 8, 2005	Greenwood Village	United States	Coors Amphitheatre
August 10, 2005	Kansas City	United States	Kemper Arena
August 12, 2005	Houston	United States	Toyota Center
August 13, 2005	New Orleans	United States	New Orleans Arena
August 14, 2005	Grand Prairie	United States	Nokia Live at Grand Prairie
August 17, 2005	Greenville	United States	BI-LO Center
August 18, 2005	Nashville	United States	Gaylord Entertainment Center
August 19, 2005	Birmingham	United States	BJCC Arena
August 20, 2005	Memphis	United States	FedExForum
August 21, 2005	Atlanta	United States	Philips Arena
August 24, 2005	New York City	United States	Madison Square Garden
August 25, 2005	Philadelphia	United States	Wachovia Center
August 26, 2005	Washington, D.C.	United States	MCI Center
August 27, 2005	Greensboro	United States	Greensboro Coliseum
September 1, 2005	Jacksonville	United States	Jacksonville Veterans Memorial Arena
September 2, 2005	Tampa	United States	St. Pete Times Forum
September 3, 2005	Orlando	United States	TD Waterhouse Centre
September 4, 2005	Miami	United States	Miami Arena
