= I Get It In (Omarion song) =

Single by Omarion featuring Gucci Mane

from the album Ollusion
- Released: November 24, 2009
- Recorded: 2009
- Genre: R&B; hip hop
- Length: 3:08
- Label: EMI
- Songwriters: Omari Grandberry, J. Valentine, Durrell "Tank" Babbs, Radric Davis, Jerry "Texx" Franklin, Robert Newt
- Producer: Song Dynasty

Omarion singles chronology
| "Hey Baby (Jump Off)" (2007) | "I Get In It" (2009) | "Speedin'" (2010) |

Gucci Mane singles chronology
| "Spotlight" (2009) | "I Get It In'" (2009) | "Lemonade" (2009) |

"I Get It In" is a song by American singer Omarion, released on November 24, 2009, by EMI as the first single from his third studio album, Ollusion (2010). It contains a guest appearance from American rapper Gucci Mane. It was produced by Song Dynasty, a production outfit formed by R&B singers Tank and J. Valentine, among others.

While signed to Young Money Entertainment, Omarion recorded the song with label founder Lil Wayne, who provided a guest verse. According to the label's then-president Mack Maine, the unauthorized leak of the original song led Omarion to be dropped from the label. Wayne, however, said that Omarion left the group due to other opportunities he received.

== Remix ==
In October 2008, a remix of the song was released featuring an additional verse from American rapper Red Café.

== Chart performance ==
"I Get It In" debuted at number 99 on the Billboard Hot 100 for the week of November 14, 2009, but left the next week. It reappeared on the chart at number 98 the week of November 28 and peaked at number 83 the week of December 19, staying on the chart for seven weeks.

== Music video ==
A music video for "I Get It In" was released on November 9, 2009. Omarion stated that it was dedicated to Michael Jackson. Talking about the video, he said, "When I pull up, I’m getting out the car, we start choreography and then it keeps going until the end of the video. I’m telling you right now, this is probably one of the dopest videos you’ve seen in a long time because it’s a concept".

== Charts ==
| Chart (2009) | Peak position |
|---|---|
| US Billboard Hot 100 | 83 |
| US Hot R&B/Hip-Hop Songs (Billboard) | 20 |

== Controversy ==
Filipino rapper Skusta Clee released a plagiarised version of "I Get It In", titled "Ako'y Bitin", prior to rising to fame.
