= Hey Baby (Jump Off) =

Single by Bow Wow and Omarion

from the album Face Off
- Released: December 25, 2007
- Recorded: 2007
- Genre: R&B, hip hop
- Length: 3:08
- Label: Columbia, Sony BMG
- Songwriters: S. Moss, O. Granberry, S. Elise, R. Lang, K. Mack, L. Owens, R. Rubin, JT Smith, M. Sasek
- Producer: Koolade

Bow Wow singles chronology
"Girlfriend" (2007)	"Hey Baby (Jump Off)" (2007)	"I'm Grown" (2008)

Omarion singles chronology
"Girlfriend" (2007)	"Hey Baby (Jump Off)" (2007)	"I Get It In" (2009)

Bow Wow & Omarion singles chronology
"Girlfriend" (2007)	"Hey Baby (Jump Off)" (2007)

"Hey Baby (Jump Off)" is a song rapper Bow Wow and R&B singer Omarion, released on Christmas Day 2007 as the second single from their collaborative album, Face Off. Released by Sony BMG, the song samples "Going Back to Cali" by LL Cool J.

The song originally featured rapper Lil Wayne, however, he was cut from the final version for reasons unknown. His verse later leaked under the title "Santa Clause".

== Music video ==
The video was aired on Wednesday, December 26, 2007, on BET's Access Granted. The video is the conclusion to "Girlfriend". At the end of the video for "Girlfriend", Bow Wow tells Omarion he was going to take him to the "jump off" spot giving the viewer a hint of the next video. In the beginning Bow Wow and Omarion are in the Aston Martin on their way to the club. When they get to the club, Bow Wow and Omarion go into their signature sign rooms. Bow Wow enters a room with a dog paw, and Omarion enters a room with an O with a crown on it. At the end of the video both Bow Wow and Omarion are trying to get with two girls when their "girlfriends" from the "Girlfriend" video show up and then they leave.

The video includes a cameo appearance from KPWR("POWER 106")/Los Angeles air personality DJ Felli Fel.

== Other media ==
The duo also performed this song in the Ugly Betty episode "Zero Worship," which aired January 10, 2008.

== Release history ==
Country	Date
United States	December 25, 2007
United Kingdom	March 31, 2008
Japan	May 29, 2008

== Chart positions ==
Chart (2008)	Peak Position
New Zealand (Recorded Music NZ)	25
US Bubbling Under Hot 100 (Billboard)	2
US Billboard Rap Songs	24
US Billboard Pop 100	70
US Rhythmic Airplay (Billboard)	29
