= O (Omarion song) =

Single by Omarion

from the album O
- Released: August 17, 2004
- Recorded: 2004
- Length: 4:40 (album); 4:10 (radio)
- Label: Epic/Sony
- Songwriters: Harvey Mason, Jr.; Damon Thomas; Durrell Babbs; Antonio Dixon; Eric Dawkins
- Producers: The Underdogs; Tank (co-producer)

Omarion singles chronology
"O" (2004)	"Touch" (2005)

Music video
- "O" on YouTube

"O" is a song by American singer Omarion. It was released on August 17, 2004, as the lead single from his debut album of the same name. "O" was the first choice for Omarion's debut single in the UK and was picked over "Touch", which was the original choice for his first UK single. The song was Omarion's first hit as a solo artist, peaking at number 27 on the US Billboard Hot 100. It also reached numbers 12 and 24 on both the Hot R&B/Hip-Hop Songs and Mainstream Top 40 charts respectively. The song also charted in New Zealand and the UK, peaking at numbers 18 and 47 respectively.

== Chart performance ==
"O" debuted at number 68 on the Billboard Hot 100 the week of January 22, 2005. Eight weeks later, it peaked at number 27 the week of March 19, 2005 and stayed there for two weeks. It stayed on the chart for twenty weeks.

== Music video ==
Directed by Chris Stokes (who previously directed Omarion in the 2004 film You Got Served), the video features Omarion going over to a girl's house and getting intimate with her. Intercut are scenes of Omarion dancing on the roof of an apartment with his friends, a woman or by himself. The video won the BET Award for Viewer's Choice at the BET Awards 2005.

== Live performances ==
Omarion first performed "O" and "Touch" at the 2005 BET Awards on July 28, 2005. The performance was military-themed with Omarion and the dancers dressed in Army outfits. He performed the song again at the 2005 American Music Awards on November 22, 2005, as part of a medley with Bow Wow and Ciara's "Like You" and "Let Me Hold You".

== Awards and nominations ==
The song was nominated for Choice Music: Make-Out Song at the 2005 Teen Choice Awards, losing to "Oh" by Ciara featuring Ludacris.

== Track listing ==
UK - CD: 1

1. "O" (album version)
2. "O" (Jiggy Joint remix)

UK - CD: 2

1. "O" (album version)
2. "O" (Jiggy Joint remix)
3. "O" (Urban clean remix) (featuring Ray Cash)
4. "O" (video)
- Includes a poster

== Credits and personnel ==
Credits are adapted from the liner notes of O.

Recording

- Recorded and mixed at The Underlab, Los Angeles

Personnel

- The Underdogs – producer
- Tank – co-producer, background vocals
- Dave "Natural Love" Russell – recording, editing, mixer
- Dabling "Hobby Boy" Harward – editing
- Kevin Mahoney – assistant engineer
- Eric Dawkins – background vocals

== Charts ==
=== Weekly charts ===
Chart (2005)	Peak position
New Zealand (Recorded Music NZ)	14
Scotland Singles (OCC)	75
UK Singles (OCC)	47
UK Hip Hop/R&B (OCC)	7
US Billboard Hot 100	27
US Hot R&B/Hip-Hop Songs (Billboard)	12
US Pop Airplay (Billboard)	24
US Rhythmic Airplay (Billboard)	14

=== Year-end charts ===
Chart (2005)	Position
UK Urban (Music Week)	38
US Billboard 100	91
US Hot R&B/Hip-Hop Songs (Billboard)	31

== Certifications ==
Region	Certification	Certified units/sales
United States (RIAA)	Gold	500,000^{^}
^{^} Shipments figures based on certification alone.

== Release history ==
Region	Date	Format(s)	Label(s)	Ref.
United States	November 22, 2004	Rhythmic contemporary · urban contemporary radio	Epic	
United States	February 1, 2005	Contemporary hit radio	Epic	
