= Face Off (Bow Wow and Omarion album) =

Studio album by Bow Wow and Omarion
- Released: December 11, 2007
- Recorded: 2007
- Genres: R&B, hip-hop
- Length: 48:20
- Label: Columbia
- Producers: Chris Stokes; Jim Jonson; Don Vito.Blade.; Koolade; Cheeze; Infinity; L.T. Hutton; J.U.S.T.I.C.E. League; Marques Houston; Jermaine Dupri; No I.D.; Calvo da Gr8; Lil Ronnie; Blaq; Ricky "Ric Rude" Lewis; Stereotypes; T-Pain

Bow Wow chronology
The Price of Fame (2006)	Face Off (2007)	New Jack City II (2009)

Omarion chronology
21 (2006)	Face Off (2007)	Ollusion (2010)

Singles from Face Off
- 1. "Girlfriend" Released: October 12, 2007; 2. "Hey Baby (Jump Off)" Released: December 25, 2007

Professional ratings
Review scores
Source	Rating
AllMusic	3/5 stars
Billboard	(favorable)
Rolling Stone	2.5/5 stars
DJBooth.net	3.5/5 stars

Face Off is a collaborative album by American rapper Bow Wow and American singer Omarion. The album was released on December 11, 2007 through Columbia Records. The production on the album was handled by Jermaine Dupri, Jim Jonsin, Stereotypes, T-Pain, No I.D. and Lil Ronnie among others.

Face Off was supported by two singles: "Girlfriend" and "Hey Baby (Jump Off)." The album also received generally positive reviews from music critics and was a moderate commercial success. The album debuted at number 11 on the US Billboard 200 chart, selling 107,000 copies in the first week.

== Singles ==
The first single from the album was "Girlfriend". The single was released on October 12, 2007 and was produced by Don Vito and Cheeze. The single debuted at number 82 on the US Billboard Hot 100 chart on the week of November 11, 2007. After climbing the charts for six weeks, on the week of December 29, 2007, the single entered the top-40 and reached its peak at number 33 on the chart.

The second single from the album "Hey Baby (Jump Off)." The single was released on December 25, 2007 and was produced by Croatian producer Koolade. The single failed to appear on the Hot 100 chart but managed to peak at number 24 on the US Hot Rap Songs chart on the week of March 15, 2008.

== Commercial performance ==
Face Off debuted at number 11 on the US Billboard 200 chart, selling 107,000 copies in the first week. This became Omarion's first release to miss the top-ten and Bow Wow's first since his 2001 release Doggy Bag. On February 13, 2008, the album was certified gold by the Recording Industry Association of America (RIAA) for sales of over 500,000 copies in the United States.

== Track listing ==
No.	Title	Writer(s)	Producer(s)	Length
1.	"Face Off"	Omari Grandberry, Rahman Lang, Rufus Moore, Shad Moss, Kevin Perry	Multi Muzic, Kevin Perry	2:10
2.	"Hood Star"	Darhyl Camper, Grandberry, Moore, Moss, Jordan Suecof	Full Scale	3:17
3.	"Girlfriend"	Grandberry, Moss, Terius Nash, Rodney Richard, J.H. Williams	Don Vito, Cheeze	4:44
4.	"Hey Baby (Jump Off)"	Sonya Elise, Grandberry, Lang, K. Mack, Moss, L. Owens, Rick Rubin, Matko Šašek, James Todd Smith	Koolade, Multi Muzic	3:08
5.	"He Ain't Gotta Know"	Charleston Davis, Grandberry, Franchesco Romano, Faheem Najm	T-Pain	3:56
6.	"Bachelor Pad"	Calvin David Kenon, Grandberry, Lang, Moore, Moss	Calvo Da Gr8	3:19
7.	"Listen"	Grandberry, Ronnie Jackson, Moss, Jayshawn Smith	Lil Ronnie	4:57
8.	"Can't Get Tired of Me"	Jhené Chilombo, Grandberry, Brandon Howard, Rick Lewis, Moore, Moss	Ric "Rude" Lewis, Rufus Blaq	4:10
9.	"Number Ones"	Grandberry, Earl Wilbert Klugh Jr., Micayle McKinney, Moore, Moss, Jeremy Reeves, Jonathan Yip	The Stereotypes, Rufus Blaq	2:52
10.	"Baby Girl"	Grandberry, Marques Houston, L. T. Hutton, Moss, Chris Stokes	L. T. Hutton	3:57
11.	"Take Off Your Clothes"	Grandberry, Jackson, Moss, J. Smith	Lil Ronnie	3:31
12.	"Another Girl"	Grandberry, James Scheffee, Lang, Moore, Moss, Tremaine Neverson	Jim Jonsin	3:25

Japanese bonus tracks
No.	Title	Producer(s)	Length
13.	"Lights, Camera, Action"	Lil Ronnie	3:23
14.	"Let Me Hold You"	Jermaine Dupri, No I.D.	4:08

Samples credits

- "Hey Baby (Jump Off)" contains a sample of "Going Back to Cali" as performed by LL Cool J
- "Let Me Hold You" contains a sample of "If Only for One Night" as performed by Luther Vandross
- "Number Ones" contains a sample of "Mobimientos del Alma (Rhythms of the Soul)" written by Earl Wilbert Klugh Jr.

== Charts ==
=== Weekly charts ===
Chart (2007)	Peak position
UK R&B Albums (Official Charts)	27
US Billboard 200	11
US Top R&B/Hip-Hop Albums (Billboard)	1
US Top Rap Albums (Billboard)	1

=== Year-end charts ===
Chart (2008)	Position
US Billboard 200	120
US Top R&B/Hip-Hop Albums (Billboard)	35

== Certifications ==
Region	Certification	Certified units/sales
United States (RIAA)	Gold	500,000^{^}
^{^} Shipments figures based on certification alone.
