= O (Omarion album) =

Studio album by Omarion
- Released: February 22, 2005
- Recorded: 2004
- Studios: Larrabee Sound Studios (Hollywood); The Record Plant (Los Angeles); The Underlab (Los Angeles); The Grind Factory (Los Angeles); Maddhouse Recording Studios (Los Angeles); Head Up Recording Studios (New Jersey)
- Genres: R&B; hip hop
- Length: 52:31
- Labels: T.U.G.; Epic; Sony Urban
- Producers: Allstar; Exchange Student; Tha Corna Boyz; Lenton Hutton; Kenneth "K Young" Pratt; Rodney "Darkchild" Jerkins; Sean "The Pen" Garrett; Gil Smith II; Kowan "Q" Paul; Marques Houston; The Neptunes; The Underdogs; Antonio Dixon; Tank

Omarion chronology
O (2005)	21 (2006)

Singles from O
- 1. "O" Released: August 17, 2004; 2. "Touch" Released: February 11, 2005; 3. "I'm Tryna" Released: April 6, 2005

O is the debut solo studio album by American R&B singer Omarion, released on February 22, 2005 via Epic Records and Sony Urban Music. Despite featuring explicit language, the album doesn't have a Parental Advisory label on the cover. It features three singles: the title track, "Touch" and "I'm Tryna." The album entered at number one on the Billboard 200, and has sold more than 750,000 copies in the United States as of November 2008. O went on to be certified Gold by the Recording Industry Association of America (RIAA) and was nominated for a Grammy Award for Best Contemporary R&B Album at the 48th Grammy Awards.

== Critical reception ==
Professional ratings
Review scores
Source	Rating
AllMusic	2.5/5 stars
Blender	3/5 stars
Common Sense Media	3/5 stars
Entertainment Weekly	B
MTV Asia	4/10

The album received mixed reviews by critics. Billboard contributor Gail Mitchell praised the collaboration between Omarion and his producers for delivering "a healthy helping of repeat-worthy songs." Jem Aswad of Entertainment Weekly said of the record, "[T]he ballads on this solo debut have way too much whipped cream, but there are some surprisingly tough touches of funk and crunk ("Drop That Heater," the Missy-esque "Take It Off")." AllMusic editor Andy Kellman said that the album works best when the tracks are "lighthearted, summery funk ("Never Gonna Let You Go (She's a Keepa)") and have production done by the Neptunes ("Touch") and Rodney Jerkins ("Drop That Heater") instead of being overly sexual, concluding that "Had Omarion been less concerned with street credibility, realizing that it might be better to allow his young fan base to mature along with him, this debut would've been more than satisfactory." Kathi Kamen Goldmark of Common Sense Media also found the content overdone in its musings of sexual imagery, saying that it sounds "more jarring than seductive", concluding that "[T]here's a lot of potential here, if the artist can come up with some better, more subtly sexy material."

== Commercial performance ==
The album debuted at number one on the US Billboard 200 chart, selling 182,000 copies in its first week of release. In its second week, the album dropped to number eight on the chart, selling an additional 77,000 copies. In its third week, the album fell to number 12 on the chart, selling 45,030 more copies. On March 31, 2005, the album was certified gold by the Recording Industry Association of America (RIAA) for sales of over 500,000 copies in the United States. As of April 2012, the album has sold 765,000 copies in the United States.

== Track listing ==
No.	Title	Writer(s)	Producer(s)	Length
1.	"I Wish"	Richard Butler; Pierre Medor; Dwayne Nesmith	Tha Corna Boyz	3:57
2.	"Touch"	Pharrell Williams	The Neptunes	3:23
3.	"O"	Durrell Babbs; Eric Dawkins; Antonio Dixon; Harvey Mason, Jr.; Damon Thomas	The Underdogs; Tank^{[a]}	4:40
4.	"I'm Tryna"	J. Valentine; Babbs; Dixon; Mason; Thomas	The Underdogs; Dixon^{[b]}; Tank^{[b]}	4:22
5.	"Drop That Heater"	Rodney Jerkins; Sean Garrett	Rodney "Darkchild" Jerkins; Garrett^{[a]}	4:53
6.	"Growing Pains"	Omari Grandberry; Chris Stokes; Marques Houston	Houston	4:13
7.	"Take It Off" (featuring Mila J)	Grandberry; Cory Bold; Stokes; Houston	Stokes; Bold; Houston; Omarion	3:22
8.	"Never Gonna Let You Go (She's a Keepa)" (featuring Big Boi)	J. J. Jennings; Claydes Charles Smith; Antwan Patton; Charles Mack; Robert Bell; Joel Campbell; Anthony Garner; Ronald Bell; George Brown, Richard Westfield, Robert Mickens; Allen Gordon	Allstar	3:34
9.	"I Know"	Grandberry; Chris "Rawdog" Denson; Houston; Stokes	Ra.W	3:36
10.	"I'm Gon' Change"	Butler; Medor; Nesmith	Tha Corna Boyz	4:19
11.	"In the Dark"	Grandberry; Houston; Stokes; Kenny Washington	Kenny "The Wizard" Washington; Stokes^{[a]}; Houston^{[a]}; Omarion^{[a]}	4:17
12.	"Slow Dancin'"	Gil Smith II; Derric "dm1" Nimmers; Devin "dm2" Nimmers; Nate Walton; Kowan Paul	Smith II; Kowan "Q" Paul	4:25
13.	"Fiening You"	Lenton Hutton; Kenneth "K Young" Pratt	L. T. Hutton	4:10

Notes

- ^{^[a]} signifies a co-producer
- ^{^[b]} signifies an additional producer
- "I Wish" featured background vocals by Omarion and Quintin Aney.
- "O" featured background vocals by Tank and Eric Dawkins.
- "I'm Tryna" featured background vocals by Tank and Dawkins.
- "Drop That Heater" featured background vocals by Omarion and Sean Garrett.
- "Never Gonna Let You Go (She's a Keepa)" featured background vocals by Charles "Charlie" Crawford and Jamie Vick.
- "I'm Gon' Change" featured background vocals by Omarion, One Chance and Pierre Medor.

Sample credits

- "Never Gonna Let You Go (She's a Keepa)" contains a replay of "Electric Frog (Part II)" as written by Richard Westfield, George Brown, Robert Bell, Ronald Bell, Claydes Smith and Robert Mickens.

== Personnel ==
Adapted from the O media notes.

- Joel Campbell – bass, keyboard
- Carey Drisdom – bass
- Bryan Tate – trumpet
- Ryan Tate – trombone
- Percy Richard, Omarion Grandberry, Marques Houston, Henley Regisford Jr., Chris Stokes – executive producers
- Pharrell, Darkchild, Chris Stokes, Tank, The Underdogs, Sean Garrett, Corna Boyz, AllStar, L.T. Hutton, Paul "Scooby" Smith – producers
- Sean Garrett, Pierre Medor – vocal producers
- Quintin Aney, Durrell Babbs, Charles "Charlie" Crawford, Eric Dawkins, One Chance, Sean Garrett, Pierre Medor – vocal assistance
- David Ashton, Andrew Coleman, Brian Garten, Jaymz Hardy Martin III, Dabling Harward, Sam Lobue II, Chris 'TEK' O'Ryan, Angelo Quaglia, Dave Russell, Brian Summer, Wassim Zreik – engineers
- Kevin Mahoney – assistant engineer
- Kevin "KD" Davis, Jean-Marie Horvat, Dave Russell, Dexter Simmons, Phil Tan – mixing
- Justin Shtuntz, Rob Skipworth – mixing assistance
- Herb Powers – mastering
- Ellen To – art direction
- Kimo Easterwood, Jonathan Mannion, Joaquin Palting – photography

== Charts ==
=== Weekly charts ===
Weekly chart performance
Chart (2005)	Peak position
Australian Albums (ARIA)	83
Australian Urban Albums (ARIA)	16
Canadian Albums (Nielsen SoundScan)	75
UK Albums (Official Charts)	129
UK R&B Albums (Official Charts)	12
US Billboard 200	1
US Top R&B/Hip-Hop Albums (Billboard)	1

=== Year-end charts ===
Year-end chart performance
Chart (2005)	Position
US Billboard 200	96
US Top R&B/Hip-Hop Albums	27

== Certifications ==
Certifications
Region	Certification	Certified units/sales
United States (RIAA)	Gold	500,000^{^}
^{^} Shipments figures based on certification alone.

== See also ==
- List of Billboard 200 number-one albums of 2005
- List of Billboard number-one R&B albums of 2005
