= Touch (Omarion song) =

Single by Omarion

from the album O
- Released: February 11, 2005
- Recorded: 2004
- Genre: Post-disco; R&B
- Length: 3:21
- Label: Epic; Sony Urban
- Songwriter: Pharrell Williams
- Producer: The Neptunes

Omarion singles chronology
"O" (2004)	"Touch" (2005)	"I'm Tryna" (2005)

Music video
- "Touch" on YouTube

"Touch" is a song by American R&B singer Omarion. It was released on February 11, 2005, as the second single off his 2005 debut album O. The song was written by Pharrell Williams and includes his background vocals on the song's bridge. The song was produced by The Neptunes. "Touch" was originally planned to be the first single from O in the UK. However, it was eventually decided that as in the US, "O" would be the first single from the album there as well.

The song was not a hit in the US, only peaking at number 94 on the Billboard Hot 100 and number 35 on the Hot R&B/Hip-Hop Songs chart.

== Chart performance ==
"Touch" debuted at number 99 on the Billboard Hot 100 the week of June 25, 2005. It moved to number 98 the week after before leaving the chart. It re-entered the chart and peaked at number 94 the week of July 30, 2005.

== Music video ==
The music video of "Touch" was directed by Diane Martel and choreographed by Shane Sparks and Blake Anthony; with Rasheed Musbah as co-choreographing consultant. At the beginning of the video, Omarion sees a sexy girl (Danielle Polanco) outside a club. Omarion showcases some elaborate choreography. They dance their way down the street until the girl's friends drive by and Omarion ducks into a store. When they leave, he comes out and they continue their dance to her apartment. The video ends with her putting a stopper in the door, inviting him in.

== Live performance ==
Omarion performed "Touch" along with "O" at the 2005 BET Awards on July 28, 2005. The performance was Military-themed with Omarion and the dancers dressed in Army outfits. For the "Touch" section, Danielle Polanco (who appeared in the song's video) came out on stage and danced with Omarion.

== Awards and nominations ==
The song was nominated for Choice Music: R&B/Hip-Hop Track at the 2005 Teen Choice Awards, losing to "1, 2 Step" by Ciara featuring Missy Elliott.

== Track listing ==
US 12"

1. "Touch" (Album Version)
2. "Touch" (Instrumental W/Background Vocals)
3. "O" (Urban Clean Mix) (featuring Ray Cash)
4. "O" (Urban Instrumental Mix)

== Credits and personnel ==
Credits are adapted from the liner notes of O.

Recording

- Recorded at The Record Plant, LA
- Mixed at Right Track and Silent Sound Studios

Personnel

- The Neptunes – producer
- Andrew Coleman – recording
- Brian Garten – recording
- Phil Tan – mixer
- Justin Shturtz – assistant engineer
- Rob Skipworth – assistant engineer

== Charts ==
Chart (2005)	Peak position
US Billboard Hot 100	94
US Hot R&B/Hip-Hop Songs (Billboard)	35
