= Ollusion =

Studio album by Omarion
- Released: January 12, 2010
- Length: 38:08
- Label: StarrWorld; MusicWorks
- Producer: 253; Battle Roy; Detail; Marques Houston; King Solomon Logan; MaddScientist; Naruto's Melody's; Song Dynasty

Omarion chronology
Face Off (2007)	Ollusion (2010)	Sex Playlist (2014)

Singles from Ollusion
- 1. "I Get It In" Released: November 24, 2009; 2. "Speedin'" Released: January 12, 2010; 3. "Last Night (Kinkos)" Released: May 11, 2010

Ollusion is the third studio album by American R&B singer Omarion. It was released on January 12, 2010, by MusicWorks and his own label StarrWorld Entertainment through EMI Label Services. The album sold 21,200 copies its first week of sales.

== Background ==
In early 2009, after two albums releases with Sony Urban Music, Omarion asked for a release from Epic Records. Timbaland was originally set to produce and release his next project under his Interscope Records-distributed Mosley Music Group, but hardly found any time to get involved in the creative process. In mid-August, he was announced to have joined the roster of rapper Lil Wayne's record label Young Money Entertainment. After rumors surfaced that he was dropped for leaking the song "I Get It In" later that week, it was proven to be false as an interview with Lil Wayne who stated that it was "just business," and that Omarion himself had asked for the release. He ultimately released Ollusion on his own imprint, StarrWorld Entertainment, having struck a new deal with EMI by late September 2009.

== Promotion ==
"I Get It In" featuring rapper Gucci Mane, was released as the lead single from Ollusion on November 24, 2009. The song was co-written by American singer-songwriter Tank, in collaboration with Omarion and J. Valentine, and produced under their production moniker Song Dynasty. Initially recorded with Lil Wayne, it was re-recorded and released featuring Gucci Mane after Ormarion had left Wayne's record label Young Money Entertainment. "I Get It In" peaked at number 83 on the US Billboard Hot 100 chart, and number 20 on the US Hot R&B/Hip-Hop Songs chart. Original version of the song peaked at number 89 on the US Billboard Hot 100 chart.

"Speedin'" was released January 12, 2010 as Ollusion's second single. The midtempo song was written by Omarion and Derek "D.C." Clark, Michael "M.I." Cole, Emmanuel "Peanut" Frayer and Chris "Breez" Fuller of 253, while production was also helmed by the four-person production team. The song debuted at number 73 on the US Hot R&B/Hip-Hop Songs and number 5 on the US Bubbling Under Hot 100 Singles. "Last Night (Kinkos)", produced Detail, was released May 11, 2010 as Ollusion' third and final single. It debuted at number 88 on the US Hot R&B/Hip-Hop Songs. The song's official remix features West Coast rapper Snoop Dogg.

== Critical reception ==
Professional ratings
Aggregate scores
Source	Rating
Metacritic	71/100
Review scores
Source	Rating
AllMusic	4/5 stars
Billboard	3.5/5 stars

Ollusion received generally positive reviews from contemporary music critics. At Metacritic, which assigns a normalised rating out of 100 to reviews from mainstream critics, the album received an average score of 71, which indicates "generally favorable reviews," based on 4 reviews. Allmusic's editor Andy Kellman found it "Almost all of these beats would be classified as snapping, slapping, or smacking before banging, flecked with details yet simultaneously somewhat half-assed-sounding. Given the number of partially detached vocals, filled with android-in-heat impersonations, clipped-phrase drop-ins, and messing around, it's as if Omarion wanted to make a concerted attempt to downplay his vocal ability, which only adds to the album's weird, teasing charm."

Monica Herrera of Billboard magazine wrote that the album "the set come off more like a bid for street cred than maturation. Lyrics full of hip-hop bravado over dirty, and distortion-heavy beats. But when Omarion reaches for the high notes, he shines like a seasoned star." Kyle Jarmon from Parlé magazine remarked that Ollusion "that offers a decisive mix of upbeat club bangers and tailored chill ballads that complement the former B2K vocalist’s modern sound." He found that the album "comes off as a more developed project than that of previous efforts. Each of the songs does invite a sense that Omarion is trying to be a cut above the rest, but they contrive a safe appeal, making it less noteworthy than 21 or O." Jon Caramanica of The New York Times wrote that "clunky lyrics are everywhere, undoing some of the progress Omarion has made. The otherwise lovely "Speedin'," Omarion's most convincing song here."

== Commercial performance ==
Ollusion debuted at number 19 on the US Billboard 200 and number seven on the US Billboard Top R&B/Hip-Hop Albums chart, with first-week sales of 19,300 copies in the United States, far below his previous solo album 21, which had also debuted at number one with 188,000 copies. By May 2012, Ollusion had sold 78,000 copies in the United States, according to Nielsen Soundscan.

== Track listing ==
Ollusion track listing
No.	Title	Writer(s)	Producer(s)	Length
1.	"I Get It In" (featuring Gucci Mane)	Omari Grandberry; Durrell Babbs; Johnnie Valentine; Bob Newt; Radric Davis; Jerry Franklin	Song Dynasty	3:08
2.	"Last Night (Kinkos)"	Grandberry; Noel Fisher	Detail; Drummaz^{[a]}	3:08
3.	"Hoodie" (featuring Jay Rock)	Grandberry; Derek "D.C." Clark; Michael "M.I." Cole; Emmanuel "Peanut" Frayer; Chris "Breez" Fuller; Johnny McKenzie; Chris Stokes	253	3:35
4.	"What Do You Say"	Grandberry; Roy Battle; Chris Brown; Lonny Bereal; Beat Syndicate	Battle Roy; Bereal^{[a]}	3:39
5.	"Speedin'"	Grandberry; Clark; Cole; Frayer; Fuller; Stokes	253	4:24
6.	"Temptation"	Grandberry; Clark; Cole; Frayer; Fuller; Stokes	253	3:40
7.	"Sweet Hangover"	Grandberry; Fisher; Mitch Cohn	Detail; Catalyst^{[a]}	3:23
8.	"Thee Interlude" (with Marques Houston)	Grandberry; Houston; Stokes	Houston	1:09
9.	"Wet"	Grandberry; Houston; Stokes	Houston; Naruto's Melody's	5:40
10.	"I Think My Girl is Bi"	Grandberry; Bereal; James Rayshawn Smith; Terry Thomas	MaddScientist	4:04
11.	"Code Red"	Grandberry; Clark; Cole; Frayer; Fuller; Stokes	253	2:32
Total length:				38:08

iTunes Store bonus track
No.	Title	Writer(s)	Producer(s)	Length
12.	"On My Grind" (featuring Tank)	Grandberry; Babbs; Valentine; Newt	Song Dynasty	3:26
Total length:				41:34

Japanese bonus tracks
No.	Title	Writer(s)	Producer(s)	Length
12.	"On My Grind" (featuring Tank)	Grandberry; Babbs; Valentine; Newt	Song Dynasty	3:26
13.	"Ollusion"	Grandberry; James Fauntleroy; King Solomon Logan	Logan	3:00
Total length:				44:34

Notes

- ^{^[a]} denotes co-producer(s)

== Personnel ==
Credits for Ollusion adapted from Allmusic.

- 253 Music, Inc. – producer, background vocals
- Elvis Aponte – engineer, mixing
- Ayeesha – hair stylist
- Lonny Bereal – producer
- Claudio Cueni – engineer, mixing, producer
- Eric Eylands – assistant engineer
- Drum Up – producer
- Noel "Detail" Fisher – engineer, mixing, producer
- Brian "Big Bass" Gardner – mastering
- Gucci Mane – featured artist
- Marques Houston – featured artist, primary artist, producer
- Naima Jamal – make-up
- Harvey Mason, Jr. – mixing
- Naruto's Melodys – producer
- Omarion – creative director, executive producer, primary artist
- Jay Rock – featured artist
- Battle Roy – musician, producer
- Nicki Saglimbeni – photography
- Chris Stokes – A&R, creative director, executive producer
- J. Valentine – engineer
- Eric Weaver – assistant engineer

== Charts ==
=== Weekly charts ===
Weekly chart performance for Ollusion
Chart (2010)	Peak position
US Billboard 200	19
US Top R&B/Hip-Hop Albums (Billboard)	7
US Independent Albums (Billboard)	2

=== Year-end charts ===
Year-end chart performance for Ollusion
Chart (2010)	Position
US Top R&B/Hip-Hop Albums (Billboard)	76
US Independent Albums (Billboard)	46
