= Distance (Omarion song) =

Single by Omarion
- Released: February 10, 2017
- Recorded: 2016
- Genre: Dancehall; R&B
- Length: 3:03
- Label: Maybach Music; Atlantic
- Songwriters: Lyrica Anderson: Floyd Bentley; Arin Ray Camp; Christopher Dotson; Nick Fouryn; Omari Ishmael Grandberry; Samuel David Jimenez; Melvin Ray Moore; Gabriel Tavarez; Christian J. Ward

Omarion singles chronology
"Okay Ok" (2016)	"Distance" (2017)	"Can You Hear Me?" (2020)

Music video
- "Distance" on YouTube

"Distance" is a song by American singer Omarion. It was released on February 10, 2017, as a standalone single.

== Release ==
The song premiered on February 9, 2017, and was released for digital download as a single on the next day. In an interview with Noisey, Omarion called the song "a clash of culture and sound". The official remix by VICE was released on May 12, 2017.

== Music video ==
The music video for the song premiered via Omarion's YouTube channel on February 9, 2017. It was filmed in South Africa.

== Track listing ==
- Digital download
1. "Distance" – 3:03
- Digital download (VICE Remix)
1. "Distance (VICE Remix)" – 3:27

== Charts ==
Chart (2017)	Peak position
US Mainstream R&B/Hip-Hop (Billboard)	39
UK BBC 1Xtra Airplay Chart	24

== Certifications ==
Certification for "Distance"
Region	Certification	Certified units/sales
New Zealand (RMNZ)	Platinum	30,000^{‡}
^{‡} Sales+streaming figures based on certification alone.
