= Speedin' (Omarion song) =

"Speedin"

Single by Omarion

from the album Ollusion
- Released: January 12, 2010
- Recorded: 2009
- Genre: R&B, hip hop
- Length: 4:24
- Label: EMI
- Songwriters: Chris Fuller, Derek Clark, Emmanuel Frayer, Michael Cole, Jr., Omarion Grandberry
- Producer: 253

Omarion singles chronology
"I Get It In" (2009)	"Speedin" (2010)	"Post to Be" (2014)

"Speedin'" is the second single from Omarion's third studio album Ollusion (2010). The song, produced by 253, debuted at number 73 on the US Hot R&B/Hip-Hop Songs chart.

== Concept ==
To Rap-Up, he recently explained about the concept of the song 'Speedin' itself. "The concept of the song is that I'm racing to get to my girl because I love her and I care about her," He gushed. "It has so many meanings too, not just racing time. We're racing like whether or not we're gonna be together."

== Music video ==
The music video, was thought to be a continuation of Omarion's previous music video 'Hoodie', which ends with the title 'to be continued'. The idea of the video is speeding back to love, a lost love, in the video his fiance` is shown packing her bags and telling him that she has to leave, she then leaves him with her engagement ring and his thoughts. Later in the video Omarion is seen speeding on the highway in a Lamborghini Gallardo Spyder as he races against time to be together with the girl he loves. She then walks out of the house, at the exact time that Omarion walks in but the two never see each other. His love interest is portrayed by his longtime best friend, actress Malika Haqq, which caused some to speculate that the two were more than best friends and had been secretly dating for a long time. The director of the music video is Chris Stokes and co-director is Kevin Shulman.

== Charts ==
=== Weekly charts ===
Chart (2010)	Peak position
US Bubbling Under Hot 100 (Billboard)	5
US Hot R&B/Hip-Hop Songs (Billboard)	26

=== Year-end charts ===
Chart (2010)	Position
US Hot R&B/Hip-Hop Songs (Billboard)	93
