= Feel the Noise =

- Theatrical release poster
- Directed by: Alejandro Chomski
- Written by: Albert Leon
- Produced by: Simon Fields; Sofia Sondervan; Jennifer Lopez
- Starring: Omarion Grandberry; Zulay Henao; James McCaffrey; Kellita Smith; Malik Yoba; Melonie Diaz; Victor Rasuk; Giancarlo Esposito
- Cinematography: Zoran Popovic
- Edited by: Bill Pankow; Suzy Elmiger; Nico Sarudiansky
- Music by: Jennifer Lopez; Andres Levin
- Production companies: TriStar Pictures; Sony BMG Film; Nuyorican Productions
- Distributed by: Sony Pictures Releasing
- Release date: October 5, 2007
- Running time: 86 minutes
- Country: United States
- Language: English
- Box office: $6.4 million

Feel the Noise is a 2007 American drama film written by Albert Leon, directed by Alejandro Chomski and produced by Jennifer Lopez. It was released on October 5, 2007 and stars Omarion, Giancarlo Esposito, Victor Rasuk and James McCaffrey.

== Plot ==
After a run-in with local thugs to raise money for a chance at a record deal, a Harlem born aspiring rapper of an African American mother and Puerto Rican father, Rob flees to Puerto Rico, seeks refuge with a Puerto Rican father he never knew, and finds his salvation in Reggaeton, a spicy blend of hip-hop, reggae and Latin beats. Puerto Rico, the spiritual home of Reggaeton, inspires Rob and his step-brother Javi to pursue their dream of becoming Reggaeton stars. Together with a dancer named C.C., they learn what it means to stay true to themselves and each other, while overcoming obstacles in love, greed and pride, all culminating in an explosive performance at New York's Puerto Rican Day Parade.

== Cast ==
- Omarion as Rob
- Giancarlo Esposito as Roberto
- Victor Rasuk as Javier "Javi"
- Zulay Henao as Carol "C.C." Reyes
- James McCaffrey as Jeffrey Skyler
- Melonie Diaz as Mimi
- Meredith Ostrom as Noelia
- Rosa Arredondo as Marivi
- Alexis Garcia as Peter
- Notch as himself
- Pras as "Electric"
- Charles Duckworth as "Nodde"
- Cisco Reyes as Pito
- Kellita Smith as Tanya
- Malik Yoba as The Mayor
- Jerome Jones as himself
- Vico C as himself
- Julio Voltio as himself
- Jennifer Lopez as herself

== Critical reception ==
On the review aggregator website Rotten Tomatoes, 12% of 26 critics' reviews are positive. The website's consensus reads: "Despite the different musical genre, Feel the Noise is as generic as any music-themed film that has come before it." Metacritic, which uses a weighted average, assigned the film a score of 36 out of 100, based on 9 critics, indicating "generally unfavorable" reviews.

At the U.S. box office, since its release it has grossed $5,898,393, and $552,713 from foreign markets.
