= Omarion =

American singer (born 1984)

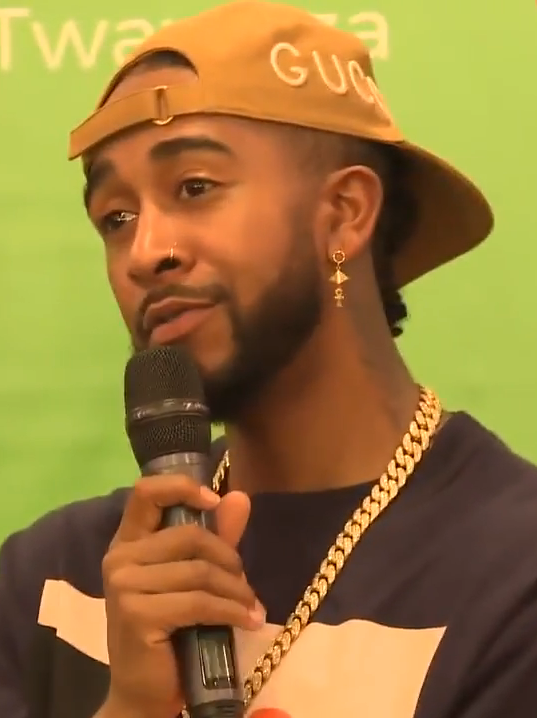
- Omarion in 2018

Background information
- Also known as: O
- Born: Omari Ishmael Grandberry; November 12, 1984 (age 42); Inglewood, California, U.S.
- Genres: R&B; pop
- Occupations: Singer; songwriter; dancer; actor
- Works: Omarion discography
- Years active: 1998–present
- Labels: Omarion Worldwide; Warner; Atlantic; Maybach Music; Columbia; EMI; Epic; Sony Urban Music
- Member of: B2K
- Children: 2
- Website: omarionworldwide.com

Omari Ishmael Grandberry (born November 12, 1984), better known by his stage name Omarion, is an American R&B and pop singer, songwriter, dancer, and actor. He rose to prominence as lead vocalist of the boy band B2K, which was formed in 1998 and managed by record executive Chris Stokes. The group achieved success in the early 2000s with their singles "Gots ta Be", "Uh Huh", "Girlfriend", and the Billboard Hot 100-number one hit "Bump, Bump, Bump" (featuring P. Diddy).

After the group's 2004 disbandment, Omarion promptly embarked on a solo career. He signed with Epic Records to release his first two studio albums, O (2005) and 21 (2006), both of which debuted atop the Billboard 200. The former was led by the Billboard Hot 100-top 40 single "O" and was nominated for Best Contemporary R&B Album at the 48th Annual Grammy Awards, while the latter spawned the single "Ice Box", which remains his highest-charting song on the Billboard Hot 100, peaking at number 12. Omarion guest appeared on Bow Wow's 2005 single "Let Me Hold You", which peaked at number four on the chart; the artists released the collaborative album, Face Off (2007), followed by Omarion's third studio album, Ollusion (2010), both of which received moderate commercial response. He signed with Rick Ross' record label Maybach Music Group to release his fourth album, Sex Playlist (2014). It was preceded by the single "Post to Be" (featuring Chris Brown and Jhené Aiko), which peaked at number 13 on the Billboard Hot 100 and received sextuple platinum certification by the Recording Industry Association of America (RIAA).

Omarion has also ventured into acting, with appearances in films such as You Got Served, Fat Albert, Somebody Help Me and The Proud Family Movie. As a solo artist, he has received a BET Award, a Billboard Music Award, and a Soul Train Music Award.

== Life and career ==
=== 1984–1998: Early life and career beginnings ===
Omarion was born Omari Ishmael Grandberry on November 12, 1984, in Inglewood, California to Leslie Burrell and Trent Grandberry. His younger brother, O'Ryan, is also a singer. He appeared in commercials for both Kellogg's Corn Pops and McDonald's. He started his dancing career as a background dancer for the R&B girl group Before Dark and appeared in their music videos. Omarion soon began pursuing a career in music and would go on to become the lead singer of the boy band B2K. Omarion also attended Alexander Hamilton High School in Los Angeles.

=== 1998–2004: B2K ===
Omari joined the group B2K in 1998 and took the stage name Omarion. The group named themselves B2K, an acronym for "Boys of The New Millennium". They began touring with Lil Bow Wow and eventually released their debut single, "Uh Huh", in 2001. They soon after released their debut album, the self-titled B2K, on March 12, 2002. The album peaked at No. 2 on the Billboard 200 and No. 1 on the Top R&B/Hip-Hop albums chart. They followed the album up in December with their second album, Pandemonium!, supported by their most successful single, "Bump, Bump, Bump" featuring P. Diddy. The single peaked at No. 1 on the Billboard Hot 100. This would prove to be the group's last album, as they would disband in early 2004.

=== 2004–2008: O, 21, and Face Off ===
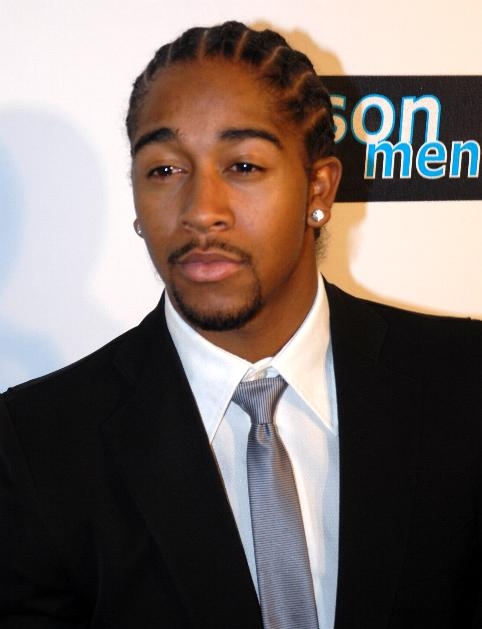
Omarion in 2007

In early 2004, Omarion appeared in several films, most notably You Got Served, in which he starred alongside Marques Houston, as well as his former B2K bandmates. The movie centered on a group of friends in a hip hop dance crew who take part in underground dance competitions. That same year, he played the role of the school bully "Reggie" in the comedy Fat Albert, based on the animated series Fat Albert and the Cosby Kids. On February 22, 2005, Omarion released his debut solo album, O. The album debuted at No. 1 on the Billboard 200 and Top R&B/Hip-Hop Albums charts. The first single from the album was "O". The single peaked at No. 27 on the Billboard Hot 100 chart. The second single, "Touch", peaked at No. 94 on the Billboard Hot 100. The album received a third and final release with "I'm Tryna". O has sold over 758,000 copies in the United States since its release. Omarion received a Grammy nomination for the album at the 48th Annual Grammy Awards for Best Contemporary R&B Album. On December 26, 2006, Omarion released his second album, 21. The album debuted at No. 1 on the Billboard 200 and Top R&B/Hip-Hop Albums charts. The first single from the album was "Entourage". The second single, "Ice Box", produced by Timbaland, peaked at No. 12 on the Billboard Hot 100 and is Omarion's most successful solo single to date, reaching gold certification by the RIAA. 21 has sold over 390,000 copies in the United States since its release.

Towards the end of 2007, he displayed his acting skills in the thriller Somebody Help Me. This movie was released exclusively on DVD and aired on BET in celebration of Halloween. Omarion has also made several appearances in a number of TV shows, including One on One. Omarion also played the voice of Fifteen Cent in The Proud Family Movie. His portrayal of a rapper who gets involved with thugs in the movie Feel the Noise, which he co-produced, received mixed reviews from critics. In late 2007, Omarion and Bow Wow recorded a collaboration album titled Face Off. The album sold over 100,000 copies in its first week and went on to sell over 500,000 copies, reaching gold certification by the RIAA. The first single from the album was "Girlfriend", followed up by "Hey Baby" as the second single.

=== 2009–2010: EMI and Ollusion ===
On March 30, 2009, Lil Wayne confirmed that Omarion was affiliated (though not officially signed) with Young Money Entertainment. Four months later, he parted ways with the label; both Lil Wayne and Omarion confirmed that his departure had been for business reasons. Omarion then signed with EMI and created his own label, StarrWorld Entertainment. He later re-released the single "I Get It In" with Lil Wayne replaced by Gucci Mane. In January 2010, Omarion released his second single, "Speedin'". That same month, he released his third studio album, Ollusion, which sold 19,400 copies in its first week. Omarion also became a judge on the fifth season of America's Best Dance Crew, replacing former judge Shane Sparks. He left after Season 5 to focus on his music career.

=== 2011–2017: Sex Playlist ===
In early 2011, Omarion worked on his first mixtape presented by DJ Drama, titled The Awakening. Originally set to be released on April 27, 2011, the mixtape was instead released on May 11, 2011. In November 2011, Omarion was seen on set with Japanese star Koda Kumi. On December 6, 2011, it was revealed that he collaborated with the star on the song "Slow" for her 2012 album Japonesque and appeared in the music video. On May 2, 2012, Omarion signed with Rick Ross label Maybach Music Group and Warner Bros. Records. He then appeared on Self Made Vol. 2, which made the Top 10 on the Billboard 200. Also in 2012, Omarion signed to Jay-Z's Roc Nation Management. On November 29, 2012, he released his debut EP, Care Package. September 2013 saw the release of Self Made Vol. 3 featuring Omarion, which also reached the Top 10 on Billboard 200 at number 4. Care Package 2, his second EP, was released on November 5, 2013.

On February 14, 2014, he released "You Like It", the first single in promotion of his fourth studio album, Sex Playlist. On August 18, Omarion was cast to be a part of Love & Hip Hop: Hollywood along with his mother, and girlfriend Apryl Jones while awaiting the arrival of their first child. In November 2014, he released a second single, "Post to Be", featuring Chris Brown and Jhené Aiko. Sex Playlist was released on December 2, 2014. "Post to Be" gained substantial commercial success, reaching No. 13 on the Billboard Hot 100. The song peaked in the top ten on the Urban Radio chart, the Rhythmic chart, and the Hot R&B/Hip-Hop Songs chart, reaching gold status by the RIAA in May 2015. The song also won him a Soul Train Music Award for Best Collaboration.

In June 2015, Omarion stated in an interview that he wanted to open his own dance studio by the end of the year. He released his third EP, Care Package 3 on November 12, 2015. November 2017 was met with the release of the fourth EP, Care Package 4. Omarion released the song "Distance" in 2017, for which he filmed a music video in South Africa.

=== 2018–2023: The Millennium Tour and The Kinection ===
In 2018, he was featured on the track "Tell Me" from Anatii's album Artiifact. That same year, he also appeared in the "Get It Now" remix music video by Tiwa Savage as a featured artist.

In 2019, B2K briefly reformed to go on The Millennium Tour; joined by supporting acts Mario, Ying Yang Twins, Chingy, Pretty Ricky, Bobby V and Lloyd. The tour kicked off on March 8 in Pittsburgh, Pennsylvania and wrapped up on April 28 in Louisville, Kentucky. It was later announced that Omarion would be continuing The Millennium Tour without his bandmates and with Bow Wow and other acts added to the lineup for 2020 dates. The group was nominated for Top R&B Tour at the 2020 Billboard Music Awards.

In 2020, Omarion released the single "Can You Hear Me?" featuring a guest verse from T-Pain. The single was announced as the lead song from Omarion's fifth album, The Kinection. On October 29, Omarion presents Thriller Night premiered on YouTube in celebration of the album release. The event included Prince Jackson live from Michael Jackson's Hayvenhurst Estate. Omarion released The Kinection on October 30, 2020.

In 2021, Omarion competed in season five of The Masked Singer as the wild card contestant "Yeti". Certain performances have the Yeti's feet swapped out with different footwear. He finished in fourth place.

On May 31, 2021, "We Will Never Forget" with Omarion, Lalah Hathaway, and Kierra Sheard was released by being featured in the documentary film, Dreamland: The Burning of Black Wall Street which was executive produced by LeBron James, with all proceeds going to Color of Change.

Omarion headlined The Millennium Tour in the fall of 2021 and concurrently released a single with Soulja Boy and Bow Wow titled "EX" from his forthcoming album Sex Playlist 2, which he announced through Songtrust. He was nominated for Top R&B Tour and Top Rap Tour at the 2022 Billboard Music Awards, winning the latter award alongside Bow Wow. On June 23, 2022, he did a Verzuz on season 2 with Mario. He soon after announced his new book, Unbothered: The Power Of Choosing Joy, his second book after 2005's O, which was published by MTV. He also announced a new 5-part docuseries called, Omega: The Gift and the Curse, set for pay-per-view release on July 21, 2022 via the website Omarion Worldwide. In March 2023, the documentary was aired in a five part event on both We TV and Allblk after 2020's partnership with Zeus Network to premiere the film fell through due to the company allegedly withholding unaired footage.

=== 2023–present: Full Circle Sonic Book One & Two and further acting ===
In April 2023, Omarion released the single "Serious" from his album Full Circle: Sonic Book 1. A video for the song, dedicated to men who had been wrongfully incarcerated, premiered on October 20. “Serious” gained popularity on social media, reaching the number one spot on iTunes’ R&B/Soul Singles and Amazon’s R&B Best Sellers charts. Omarion’s follow-up single, “Taking Off”, featuring singer BJRNCK, from his album Full Circle: Sonic Book 2, reached No. 28 on Billboard’s Adult R&B Airplay chart dated March 30, becoming his second song in four months to debut on the chart, following "Serious" which debuted during the week of November 11, 2023, and peaked at No. 18 in January.

In February 2024, Omarion announced his Vbz on Vbz Tour, which was set to kick off April 5 but was later canceled.

In October 2024, it was announced that Omarion would star as the title character "Rose" in a series that he executive-produced for ALLBLK called Wild Rose, which debuted on March 12, 2026.

== Personal life ==
Omarion has two children, a son, Megaa Omari, born in 2014 and a daughter, A'mei Kazuko, born in 2016, with ex-girlfriend Apryl Jones, whom he dated from 2012 to 2016. Their relationship was chronicled on Love & Hip Hop: Hollywood.

Omarion has spoken about his experiences with celibacy, stating that he once had been celibate for three years. "I did it for three years. Now I look back, I be like, sheesh....Cause I love women. I love women in all [their] splendor, friendships, best friends, lovers, all that."

== Discography ==
Studio albums

- O (2005)
- 21 (2006)
- Ollusion (2010)
- Sex Playlist (2014)
- The Kinection (2020)
- Full Circle: Sonic Book One & Two (2023)
- O2 - Part 1 (2026)

Collaboration albums

- B2K (with B2K) (2002)
- Pandemonium! (with B2K) (2002)
- Face Off (with Bow Wow) (2007)

== Filmography ==
=== Film ===
Year	Title	Role	Notes
2004	You Got Served	David	
2004	Fat Albert	Reggie	
2005	The Proud Family Movie	Fifteen Cent (voice)	TV movie
2007	Feel the Noise	Rob	
2007	Somebody Help Me	Darryl Jennings	Video
2010	Wrong Side of Town	"Stash"	Video
2010	Somebody Help Me 2	Darryl Jennings	Video

=== Television ===
Year	Title	Role	Notes
2001–2005	Soul Train	Himself	Guest Cast: Season 30 & 33-34
2002	All That	Himself	Episode: "B2K"
2003–2005	Punk'd	Himself	Guest Cast: Season 2 & 4
2004–2005	The Bernie Mac Show	Shonte	Guest Cast: Season 3-4
2004–2006	One on One	Darius / Nytmare	Guest Cast: Season 3 & 5
2005–2006	Cuts	Darius	Guest: Season 1, Recurring Cast: Season 3
2005–2007	Showtime at the Apollo	Himself	Guest Cast: Season 18 & 20
2006	So You Think You Can Dance	Himself	Episode: "Top 6 Results"
2006–2007	SBC Blue Room	Himself	Guest Cast: Season 2-3
2008	Free Radio	Himself	Episode: "Lance Gets a Bodyguard"
2008	Ugly Betty	Himself	Episode: "Zero Worship"
2009	Kourtney and Khloe Take Miami	Himself	Episode: "Models Don't Skateboard"
2010	America's Best Dance Crew	Himself / Judge	Main Judge: Season 6
2012	Let's Stay Together	Julian	Episode: "The Choice is Yours"
2014–2015	Love & Hip Hop: Hollywood	Himself	Main Cast: Season 1-2
2017	Wild 'n Out	Himself / Team Captain	Episode: "Omarion/Safaree"
2019	Song Association	Himself	Episode: "B2K"
2021	The Masked Singer	Himself / Yeti	Main Cast: Season 5
2021–2023	A Black Lady Sketch Show	Himself	Guest Cast: Season 2 & 4
2022	Criss Angel's Magic with the Stars	Himself	Episode: "Amystika Chair"
2023	Omega: The Gift & The Curse	Himself	Main Cast
2023	Grown-ish	Himself	Episode: "Family Feud"
2026	Wild Rose	Rose	Main Cast; Actor/Executive Producer
2026	The Varnell Hill Show	Himself / Musical Guest	Episode: "Pay the Piper"

== Tours ==
Headlining

- Scream Tour I (2001)
- Scream Tour II (2002)
- Scream Tour III (2003)
- Scream Tour IV (2005-2006)
- Scream Tour V (2006)
- The Millennium Tour (2019-2021)
- Omarion Presents: VBZ on VBZ Tour (2024; canceled)
- The Millennium Tour (2025)
- Boys 4 Life Tour (2026)

Supporting

- One Hell of a Nite Tour (with Chris Brown) (2015)

== Awards and nominations ==
- African Muzik Magazine Awards

Year	Nominee / work	Award	Result
2018	Diamond Platnumz Feat Omarion - "African Beauty"	Best Collaboration	Won

- African Entertainment Awards

Year	Nominee / work	Award	Result
2018	Diamond Platnumz Feat Omarion - "African Beauty"	Best Collaboration	Won

- American Music Awards

Year	Nominee / work	Award	Result
2005	Himself	Favorite Soul/R&B Male Artist	Nominated

- BET Awards

Year	Nominee / work	Award	Result
2005	Himself	Best New Artist	Nominated
2005	"O"	Viewer's Choice	Won

- Billboard Music Awards

Year	Nominee / work	Award	Result
2016	"Post to Be" (Featuring Chris Brown & Jhene Aiko)	Top R&B Song	Nominated
2020	The Millennium Tour (with B2K)	Top R&B Tour	Nominated
2022	The Millennium Tour (alongside Bow Wow)	Top Rap Tour	Won
2022	The Millennium Tour (alongside Bow Wow)	Top R&B Tour	Nominated

- Urban Music Awards

Year	Nominee / work	Award	Result
2007	Himself	Most Inspiring Act	Won

- NAACP Image Awards

Year	Nominee / work	Award	Result
2006	Himself	Outstanding New Artist	Nominated
2008	Omarion with Bow Wow	Outstanding Duo or Group	Nominated

- Grammy Awards

Year	Nominee / work	Award	Result
2006	O	Best Contemporary R&B Album	Nominated

- iHeartRadio Music Awards

Year	Nominee / work	Award	Result
2016	"Post to Be" (featuring Chris Brown & Jhene Aiko)	R&B Song of the Year	Nominated

- MTV Movie Awards

Year	Nominee / work	Award	Result
2004	You Got Served	Best Male Breakthrough Performance	Nominated
2004	You Got Served	Best Dance Sequence with Marques Houston	Nominated

- Soul Train Music Awards

Year	Nominee / work	Award	Result
2015	"Post to Be" (Featuring Chris Brown & Jhene Aiko)	Best Collaboration	Won

- Teen Choice Awards

Year	Nominee / work	Award	Result
2004	You Got Served	Choice Breakout Movie Star – Male	Nominated
2005	"O"	Choice Music: Make-Out Song	Nominated
2005	Himself	Choice Music: R&B Artist	Nominated
2005	"Touch"	Choice Music: R&B Track	Nominated
2008	"Hey Baby (Jump Off)" w/ Bow Wow	Choice Music: R&B Track	Nominated
