= List of awards and nominations received by Pitbull =

Pitbull awards and nominations
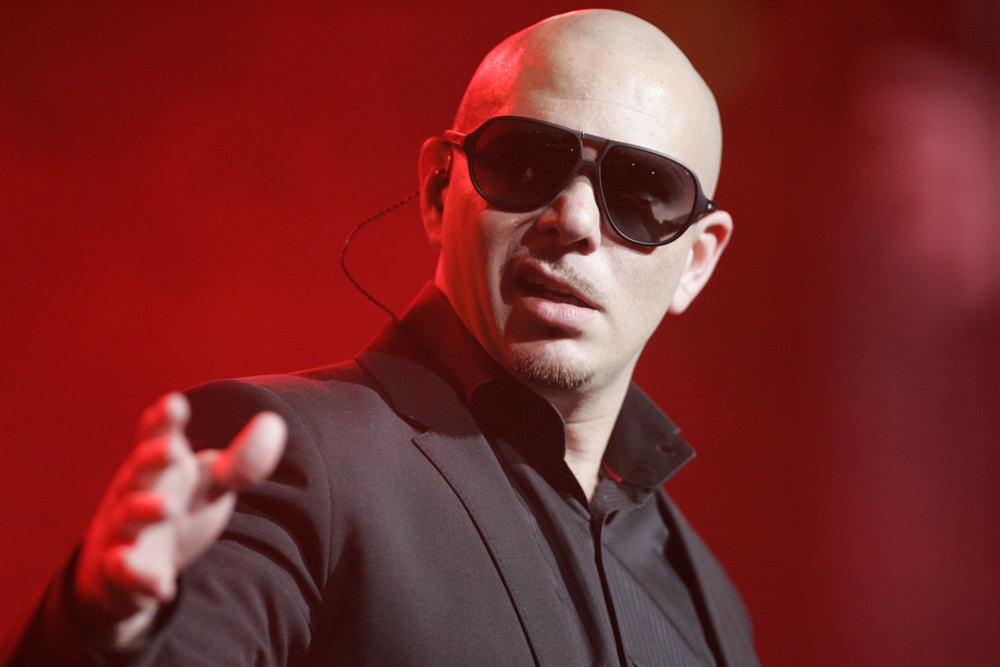
- Pitbull in 2012
Awards and nominations
Award	Wins	Nominations
American Music Awards	0	4
Billboard	2	11
Grammy	1	1
Teen Choice	0	19
Premios 40 Principales	4	9
Premios 40 Principales America	4	1
Alma Awards	2	3
Premios Tu Mundo	3	2
Latin American Music Awards	1	5
Billboard Latin Music Awards	9	35
BMI Latin Awards	3	3
International Dance Music Awards	2	1
Latin Grammy Awards	1	5
Los Premios MTV	4	3
MP3 Music Awards	3	2
MTV Video Music Awards	3	8
MTV Europe Music Awards	3	6
MuchMusic Video Awards	2	3
NRJ Music Awards	3	3
People's Choice Awards	1	2
Premio Lo Nuestro	3	3
Premios Juventud	11	15

Totals (Note: Certain award groups do not simply award one winner. They acknowledge several different recipients, have runners-up, and have third place. Since this is a specific recognition and is different from losing an award, runner-up mentions are considered wins in this award tally. For simplification and to avoid errors, each award in this list has been presumed to have had a prior nomination.)
- Wins: 46
- Nominations: 143

Armando Christian Pérez (born January 15, 1981), better known by his stage name Pitbull, is a Grammy award-winning rapper, songwriter, and record producer.

== American Music Awards ==
Year	Nominee / work	Award	Result
2011	Pitbull	Favorite Pop/Rock Male Artist	Nominated
2011	Pitbull	Favorite Latin Artist	Nominated
2012	Pitbull	Favorite Pop/Rock Male Artist	Nominated
2012	Pitbull	Favorite Latin Artist	Nominated

== ALMA Awards ==
Year	Nominee / work	Award	Result
2009	Pitbull	Best of the Year in Music	Nominated
2011	Pitbull	Favorite Male Music Artist	Won
2012	Pitbull	Favorite Male Music Artist	Won

== Billboard Music Awards ==
Year	Nominee / work	Award	Result
2011	Pitbull	Top Latin Artist	Nominated
2011	"Bon, Bon"	Top Latin Song	Won
2012	Pitbull	Top Latin Artist	Nominated
2012	"Give Me Everything"	Top Radio Song	Won
2012	"Give Me Everything"	Top Rap Song	Nominated
2012	"Give Me Everything"	Top Hot 100 Song	Nominated
2012	"Bon, Bon"	Top Latin Song	Nominated
2013	Pitbull	Top Rap Artist	Nominated
2013	"Bailando Por El Mundo" (with Juan Magan)	Top Latin Song	Nominated
2014	Pitbull	Top Rap Artist	Nominated
2014	"Timber"	Top Rap Song	Won

== Billboard Latin Music Awards ==
Year	Nominee / work	Award	Result
2009	Pitbull	Latin Digital Download Artist of the Year	Won
2010	Pitbull	Latin Rhythm Airplay Artist of the Year, Solo	Nominated
2010	"I Know You Want Me (Calle Ocho)"	Latin Rhythm Airplay Song of the Year	Nominated
2011	Pitbull	Social 50	Nominated
2011	Pitbull	Latin Rhythm Airplay	Nominated
2011	Pitbull	Latin Rhythm Albums	Nominated
2011	"Bon, Bon"	Latin Digital Download of the Year	Nominated
2011	"Bon, Bon"	Latin Rhythm Airplay	Nominated
2011	"Armando"	Latin Rhythm Albums	Nominated
2011	"I Like It" (with Enrique Iglesias)	Hot Latin Song of the Year, Vocal Event	Won
2012	Pitbull	Songs Artist of the Year, Male	Won
2012	Pitbull	Latin Rhythm Song Solo Artist of the Year	Won
2012	Pitbull	Latin Rhythm Album Solo Artist of the Year	Nominated
2012	Pitbull	Latin Pop Songs Solo Artist of the Year	Nominated
2012	"Give Me Everything"	Latin Pop Song of the Year	Nominated
2012	"Give Me Everything"	Vocal Event Song of the Year	Nominated
2012	"Give Me Everything"	Song of the Year	Won
2012	"Give Me Everything"	Airplay Song of the Year	Nominated
2012	"Armando"	Latin Rhythm Album of the Year	Nominated
2012	"Bon, Bon"	Digital Song of the Year	Nominated
2013	Pitbull	Song Artist of the Year, Male	Nominated
2013	Pitbull	Streaming Artist of the Year	Nominated
2013	Pitbull	Social Artist of the Year	Nominated
2013	Pitbull	Latin Rhythm Song of the Year, Solo	Nominated
2013	Pitbull	Latin Rhythm Album of the Year, Solo	Nominated
2013	"Bailando Por El Mundo" (with Juan Magan)	Song of the Year	Won
2013	"Bailando Por El Mundo" (with Juan Magan)	Vocal Event Song of the Year	Nominated
2013	"Bailando Por El Mundo" (with Juan Magan)	Airplay Song of the Year	Nominated
2013	"Bailando Por El Mundo" (with Juan Magan)	Latin Rhythm Song of the Year	Nominated
2014	Pitbull	Social Artist of the Year	Nominated
2016	Pitbull	Latin Rhythm Albums Artist of the Year, Solo	Won
2016	Pitbull & Enrique Iglesias	Tour of the Year	Nominated
2016	"Dale"	Latin Rhythm Album of the Year	Won
2017	Pitbull	Latin Rhythm Albums Artist of the Year, Solo	Nominated
2017	“El Taxi” (with Sensato, Lil Jon & Osmani Garcia)	Digital Song of the Year	Nominated
2018	Pitbull & Enrique Iglesias	Tour of the Year	Won
2026	Pitbull	Tour of the Year	Pending

== BMI Awards ==
Year	Nominee / work	Award	Result
2012	Pitbull	President's Award	Honored
2012	I Like It" (with Enrique Iglesias)	Latin Songwriter of the Year	Won
2012	I Like It" (with Enrique Iglesias)	BMI Latin Award – Winning Song	Won

== Grammy Awards ==
Year	Nominee / work	Award	Result
2016	Dale	Best Latin Rock, Urban or Alternative Album	Won

== iHeartRadio Music Awards ==
Year	Nominee / work	Award	Result
2015	"Timber" ft. Kesha	Best Collaboration	Won
2016	Himself	Latin Artist of the Year	Won
2017	"Ay Mi Dios" ft. IAmChino, Yandel and El Chacal	Latin Song of the Year	Nominated

== Latin American Music Awards ==
Year	Nominee / work	Award	Result
2015	"Como Yo le Doy" ft. Don Miguelo	Favorite Collaboration	Nominated
2015	"Back It Up" ft. Jennifer Lopez & Prince Royce	Favorite Dance Song	Nominated
2016	"Dale	Album of the Year	Nominated
2016	"Dale	Favorite Urban Album	Nominated
2017	Himself	Dick Clark Achievement Award	Won

== Latin Music Italian Awards ==
Year	Nominee / work	Award	Result
2012	"Dance Again" ft. Jennifer Lopez	Best Latin Song of the Year	Won
2012	Pitbull	Best Latin Male Artist of the Year	Won
2013	"Feel This Moment" ft. Christina Aguilera	Best Latin Song of the Year	Won
2014	"We Are One (Ole Ola)" ft. Jennifer Lopez & Claudia Leitte	Best Latin Song of the Year	Nominated
2014	"Timber" ft. Kesha	Best Latin Male Video of the Year	Won
2014	"Love You Te Quiero" ft. Belinda	Best Latin Female Video of the Year	Nominated
2014	"Love You Te Quiero" ft. Belinda	Best Latin Dance of the Year	Nominated
2014	"Fireball"	Best Latin Dance of the Year	Nominated
2014	"I’m a Freak" ft. Enrique Iglesias	Best Latin Dance of the Year	Won
2014	"Can’t Get Enough" ft. Becky G	Best Latin Collaboration of the Year	Nominated
2014	"Yo quiero" ft. Gente De Zona	Best Latin Tropical Song of the Year	Nominated
2014	Pitbull	Best Latin Male Artist of the Year	Nominated
2015	"Time Of Our Lives" ft. Ne Yo	Best Latin Dance of the Year	Nominated
2015	"Back It Up" ft. Jennifer Lopez & Prince Royce	Best Latin Dance of the Year	Nominated
2015	"Back It Up" ft. Jennifer Lopez & Prince Royce	Best Latin Male Video of the Year	Nominated
2015	"Back It Up" ft. Jennifer Lopez & Prince Royce	Best Latin Song of The Year	Nominated
2015	"Back It Up" ft. Jennifer Lopez & Prince Royce	Best Latin Collaboration of the Year	Nominated
2015	"El Taxi" ft. Osmani Garcia, Sensato	Best Latin Collaboration of the Year	Nominated
2015	"El Taxi" ft. Osmani Garcia, Sensato	Best Latin Urban Song of the Year	Won
2015	"Dale	Best Latin Male Album of The Year	Won
2015	Pitbull	Best Latin Male Artist of the Year	Nominated
2016	"Ay Mi Dios" ft. IMChino, Yandel, Chacal	Best Latin Urban Song of The Year	Nominated
2016	"Greenlight" ft. Flo Rida	Best Latin Dance of the Year	Nominated
2016	Pitbull	Best Latin Male Artist of the Year	Nominated
2016	Pitbull	Artist Saga	Nominated
2017	"Hey Ma" ft. Camila Cabello & J Balvin	Best Latin Collaboration of the Year	Nominated

== Latin Grammy Awards ==
Year	Nominee / work	Award	Result
2011	"Armando"	Best Urban Music Album	Nominated
2011	"Bon, Bon"	Best Urban Song	Nominated
2012	"Crazy People" (with Sensato)	Best Urban Song	Nominated
2013	Echa Pa'lla (Manos Pa'rriba)	Best Urban Performance	Won
2017	"Hey Ma (Spanish Version)" (with J Balvin & Camila Cabello)	Best Urban Song	Nominated

== Los Premios MTV ==
Year	Nominee / work	Award	Result
2009	Pitbull	Best MTV Tr3's Artist	Nominated

== MP3 Music Awards ==
Year	Nominee / work	Award	Result
2009	"I Know You Want Me (Calle Ocho)"	Best Latin Song	Won

== MTV Video Music Awards ==
Year	Nominee / work	Award	Result
2010	I Like It	Best Electronic Dance Video	Nominated
2011	Give Me Everything	Best Collaboration	Nominated
2011	Give Me Everything	Best Pop Video	Nominated
2012	Pitbull	Best Latino Artist	Nominated
2013	Pitbull	Best Latino Artist	Nominated
2013	Feel This Moment	Best Collaboration	Nominated
2014	Timber	Best Collaboration	Nominated

== MTV Europe Music Awards ==
Year	Nominee / work	Award	Result
2011	Pitbull	Best Hip Hop	Nominated
2011	"On the Floor" (with Jennifer Lopez)	Best Song	Nominated
2012	Pitbull	Best Male	Nominated
2012	International Love	Best Song	Nominated

== MTV Video Music Awards Japan ==
Year	Nominee / work	Award	Result
2013	Back in Time	Best Video from a Film	Nominated
2014	"Live It Up" (with Jennifer Lopez)	Best Collaboration Video	Nominated

== MuchMusic Video Awards ==
Year	Nominee / work	Award	Result
2011	"On the Floor" (with Jennifer Lopez)	International Video of the Year	Nominated
2011	"DJ Got Us Fallin' in Love" (with Usher)	Most Watched Video	Nominated
2012	Give Me Everything (with Ne-Yo)	International Video of the Year	Nominated

== Nickelodeon Kids' Choice Awards ==
Year	Nominee / work	Award	Result
2014	Pitbull	Favorite Male Singer	Nominated

=== Nickelodeon Kids' Choice Awards Colombia ===
Year	Nominee / work	Award	Result
2017	"Hey Ma"	Favorite Collaboration	Won

=== Nickelodeon Kids' Choice Awards México ===
Year	Nominee / work	Award	Result
2017	"Hey Ma"	Favorite Collaboration	Nominated

=== Meus Prêmios Nick ===
The Meus Prêmios Nick is an annual awards show that awards entertainers with a blimp trophy, as voted by kids on internet.

Year	Nominee / work	Award	Result	Ref.
2017	"Hey Ma"	Favorite Collaboration	Won	

== NRJ Music Awards ==
Year	Nominee / work	Award	Result
2010	"I Know You Want Me (Calle Ocho)"	International Song of the Year	Nominated
2012	Pitbull	International Artist of the Year	Nominated
2013	Pitbull	International Artist of the Year	Nominated

== People's Choice Awards ==
Year	Nominee / work	Award	Result
2012	Pitbull	Favorite Hip Hop Artist	Nominated
2013	Pitbull	Favorite Hip Hop Artist	Nominated

== Premio Lo Nuestro ==
Year	Nominee / work	Award	Result
2011	Pitbull	Urban & General Artist of the Year	Won
2012	Pitbull	Favorite Hip-Hop Artist	Won
2012	Armando	Best Album of the Year	Won
2013	"Bailando Por El Mundo" (with Juan Magan)	Urban Song of The Year	Nominated
2013	"Bailando Por El Mundo" (with Juan Magan)	Collaboration of the Year	Nominated
2014	Pitbull	Urban Artist of the Year	Won
2014	"Echa Pa'lla (Manos Pa'rriba)"	Urban Song of the Year	Won
2017	"Ay Mi Dios" (with IamChino and Yandel)	Urban Collaboration of the Year	Won
2020	"No Lo Trates" (with Daddy Yankee and Natti Natasha)	Urban Song of the Year	Nominated
2020	"No Lo Trates" (with Daddy Yankee and Natti Natasha)	Urban Collaboration of the Year	Nominated
2021	"Me Quedaré Contigo" (with Ne-Yo)	Urban/Pop Song of the Year	Nominated
2021	"Me Quedaré Contigo" (with Ne-Yo)	Crossover Collaboration of the Year	Nominated
2021	"Súbelo (Further Up)" (with Static & Ben El Tavori)	Crossover Collaboration of the Year	Nominated
2023	"Hot" (with Daddy Yankee)	Urban Dance/Pop Song of the Year	Nominated
2024	"Jumpin" (with Lil Jon)	Crossover Collaboration of the Year	Nominated
2024	"Café con Leche"	Urban Dance/Pop Song of the Year	Nominated
2025	"Freak 54 (Freak Out)" (with Nile Rodgers)	Pop-Urban/Dance Song Of The Year	Nominated
2025	"2 the Moon" (with Ne-Yo, Afrojack and DJ Buddha)	Crossover Collaboration of the Year	Nominated
2025	Trackhouse	Pop-Urban Album Of The Year	Nominated
2026	Pitbull	Pop – Male Artist of the Year	Pending
2026	"Now Or Never" (with Bon Jovi)	Crossover Collaboration of the Year	Pending
2026	"Tamo Bien" (with Enrique Iglesias)	Pop/Urban – Collaboration of the Year	Pending

== Premios Juventud ==
Year	Nominee / work	Award	Result
2009	"Ay Chico (Lengua Afuera)"	My Favorite Ringtone	Nominated
2010	Pitbull	The Best Dressed Award	Won
2011	Pitbull	Best Urban Artist	Won
2011	Pitbull	Best Moves	Nominated
2011	"I Like It" (with Enrique Iglesias)	The Perfect Combo	Nominated
2011	On the Floor" (with Jennifer Lopez)	The Perfect Combo	Nominated
2011	"Bon, Bon"	Best Song	Won
2011	"Bon, Bon"	Best Ringtone	Won
2012	Pitbull	Best Urban Artist	Won
2012	Pitbull	All Over the Dial	Nominated
2012	Pitbull	Best Moves	Nominated
2012	"Euphoria" (with Enrique Iglesias)	My Favorite Concert	Won
2012	Planet Pit	Everything I touch it	Nominated
2012	"International Love"	The Perfect Combination	Nominated
2012	"International Love"	Best Ringtone	Nominated
2013	Pitbull	Best Urban Artist	Won
2013	Pitbull	All Over the Dial	Nominated
2013	Pitbull	Best Moves	Nominated
2013	Planet Pit World Tour	My Favorite Concert	Nominated
2013	"Feel This Moment"	Favorite Hit	Nominated
2014
2014	Pitbull	Best Urban Artist	Won
2014	Pitbull	Idolo de la Juventud	Won
2015
2015	Pitbull	Best Urban Artist	Won
2015	Pitbull	Tour of the Year (with Enrique Iglesias & J Balvin)	Won
2016	"Back it Up" (with Jennifer Lopez & Prince Royce)	The Perfect Combination	Nominated
2017	"Hey Ma" (with Camila Cabello & J Balvin)	Best Song For Dancing	Nominated
2020	"I believe that we will win"	The Quarentune Song	Nominated
2020	"Me quedaré contigo" (with Ne-Yo, Lenier & El Micha)	The Traffic Jam	Nominated
2023	"Café con Leche"	Best Urban Track	Nominated
2023	"Me quedaré contigo" (with Ne-Yo ft. Lenier & El Micha)	The Traffic Jam	Nominated
2024	"Freak 54 (Freak Out)" (with Nile Rodgers)	OMG Collaboration	Nominated
2025	"Now Or Never" (with Bon Jovi)	OMG Collaboration	Nominated
2025	"2 The Moon" (with Ne-Yo, Afrojack, DJ Buddha)	Best Dance Track	Nominated
2025	"Tamo Bien" (with Enrique Iglesias)	Best Pop/Rhythmic Song	Nominated
2026	"Damn I Love Miami" (with Lil Jon)	OMG Collaboration	Nominated

== Los Premios 40 Principales ==
Year	Nominee / work	Award	Result
2010	Pitbull	Best Latin Artist	Nominated
2011	Pitbull	Best International Artist	Won
2011	"Give Me Everything"	Best International Song	Nominated
2011	"On the Floor" (with Jennifer Lopez)	Best International Song	Nominated
2011	"Bailando Por El Mundo" (with Juan Magan)	Best Dance Act	Nominated
2011	"Bailando Por El Mundo" (with Juan Magan)	Best Song	Nominated
2012	Pitbull	Most Influential Latin Artist and Producer	Won
2012	Pitbull	Best Latin Artist	Nominated
2012	Pitbull	Best Spanish Language International Artist	Nominated

== Premios 40 Principales America ==
Year	Nominee / work	Award	Result
2012	Pitbull	Best Urban Artist	Won

== Premios Tu Mundo ==
Year	Nominee / work	Award	Result
2012	"International Love"	Party Song	Nominated
2012	"Bailando Por El Mundo" (with Juan Magan)	Party Song	Nominated
2013	"Sin Ti" (with Dyland y Lenny)	Presents Best Music Video	Nominated
2013	Pitbull	I'm Sexy & I Know It	Nominated
2013	Pitbull (Epic)	Film Presents: Latino Pride In Hollywood	Nominated

== Teen Choice Awards ==
Year	Nominee / work	Award	Result
2008	"The Anthem"	Rap/Hip-Hop Track	Nominated
2009	Pitbull	Rap Artist	Nominated
2009	"I Like It" (with Enrique Iglesias)	Hook Up	Nominated
2010	Pitbull	Rap Artist	Nominated
2010	"I Know You Want Me"	Rap/Hip-Hop Track	Nominated
2011	Pitbull	R&B/Hip-Hop Artist	Nominated
2011	Pitbull	Summer Music Star: Male	Nominated
2011	"Give Me Everything"	Single	Nominated
2012	Pitbull	Male Artist	Nominated
2012	Pitbull	R&B/Hip-Hop Artist	Nominated
2012	Pitbull	Summer Music Star: Male	Nominated
2013	Pitbull	Male Artist	Nominated
2013	Pitbull	Hip-Hop/Rap Artist	Nominated
2013	Pitbull	Music Star: Male	Nominated
2013	"Feel This Moment" (ft Christina Aguilera)	Choice Single: Male Artist	Nominated
2014	Pitbull	Choice Male Artist	Nominated
2014	"Mmm Yeah" (with Austin Mahone)	Choice Single: Male Artist	Nominated
2015	Pitbull	Choice Male Artist	Nominated
2016	"Hey Ma" ft. Camila Cabello & J Balvin	Choice Latin Song	Nominated

== American Academy of Achievement ==
In 2019, he received the Golden Plate Award of the American Academy of Achievement during the International Achievement Summit in New York City.

Year	Nominee/Work	Award	Result
2019	Arts and Philanthropy	Golden Plate Award	Won

== San Diego International Film Festival ==
Ceremony was on October 18, 2019. Previous winners include Kenny Loggins.

Year	Nominee/Work	Award	Result
2019	Life's Work	Music Icon Award	Won
