= Tu Cuerpo =

Single by Pitbull featuring Jencarlos

from the album Armando
- Released: February 15, 2011
- Genre: Latin pop
- Length: 4:04
- Label: Mr. 305; Sony Music Latin
- Songwriters: Armando Pérez; Jencarlos Canela; David Miranda
- Producers: Jencarlos; David "D-Minor" Miranda

Pitbull singles chronology
"On the Floor" (2011)	"Tu Cuerpo" (2011)	"Give Me Everything" (2011)

Jencarlos singles chronology
"Buscame" (2010)	"Tu Cuerpo" (2011)	"Mi Corazón" (2011)

Music video
- "Tu Cuerpo" on YouTube

Audio sample
- "Tu Cuerpo": file; help

"Tu Cuerpo" (English: "Your Body") is a song by American rapper Pitbull, released on February 15, 2011, as the fourth official single from his fifth studio album, Armando (2010). It features vocals from American singer Jencarlos. It combines hip hop and "Latin Pop-style theatricality".

== Music video ==
The music video was released onto Pitbull's official VEVO channel on March 10, 2011. It features Pitbull, Jencarlos and a girl that dances.

The video has received over 33 million views.

== Background and composition ==
Following "Bon, Bon", "Tu Cuerpo" is the fourth single from Pitbull's fifth studio album Armando, but this song released after first single on sixth studio album Planet Pit on February 15, 2011.

== Track listing ==
- Digital download
1. "Tu Cuerpo" (featuring Jencarlos) – 4:04

== Credits and personnel ==
Adapted from the album credits.

- Armando C. Perez – songwriter
- Jencarlos Canela – songwriter, producer
- David "D-Minor" Miranda – producer

== Chart performance ==
Chart (2011)	Peak position
US Latin Rhythm Airplay (Billboard)	25

== Release history ==
Country	Date	Format
United States	November 12, 2010	Digital download – Promo Single
United States	February 15, 2011	Mainstream radio
