= Armando (album) =

Studio album by Pitbull
- Released: November 2, 2010
- Recorded: 2009–2010
- Genre: Pop rap
- Length: 38:11 (standard); 45:36 (deluxe)
- Label: Mr. 305 Inc.; Sony Latino
- Producer: The Agents; Afrojack; Clubzound Mix; DCUP; DJ Alvaro; DJ Antoine; DJ Buddha; DJ Class; DJ Laz; DJ Snake; DropDeadBeats; Eddy García; Jencarlos; Marc Kinchen; Mad Mark; David "D-Minor" Miranda; Rocco Did It Again!; Clinton Sparks; Yolanda Be Cool

Pitbull chronology
Pitbull Starring in Rebelution (2009)	Armando (2010)	Planet Pit (2011)

Singles from Armando
- 1. "Watagatapitusberry" Released: March 9, 2010; 2. "Maldito Alcohol" Released: May 11, 2010; 3. "Bon, Bon" Released: August 27, 2010; 4. "Tu Cuerpo" Released: February 15, 2011

Professional ratings
Review scores
Source	Rating
AllMusic	4/5 stars
HipHopDX	2.8/5

Armando is the first Spanish album and fifth studio album by Cuban-American rapper Pitbull. It was released on November 2, 2010, through Mr. 305 Inc. and Sony Latino. The album features production by multiple producers including Afrojack, DJ Buddha, DJ Antoine, Clinton Sparks and DJ Snake.

Armando spawned four singles: "Watagatapitusberry", "Maldito Alcohol", "Bon, Bon" and "Tu Cuerpo". The singles received airplay on Spanish radio and in Latin American countries. "Guantanamera (She's Hot)" would be reissued nearly fifteen years later on Trackhouse (Daytona 500 Edition) given a spike in popularity as a result of a TikTok trend. According to a review by Allmusic, the album is named after Pitbull's father (and also, his real name). Armando won the Lo Nuestro Award for Urban Album of the Year.

== Track listing ==
Standard edition
No.	Title	Writer(s)	Producer(s)	Length
1.	"Armando (Intro)" (The Agents featuring Papayo)	Armando Pérez; Manuel Corao; Omar Tavarez; Urales Vargas	The Agents	0:43
2.	"Maldito Alcohol" (Pitbull vs. Afrojack)	Pérez; Agustín Ribot; Nick van de Wall	Afrojack; DJ Buddha	3:21
3.	"Esta Noche" (DJ Antoine vs. Mad Mark and Clubzound Mix)	Pérez; Alejandro Almeida	DJ Antoine; Mad Mark; Clubzound Mix	3:02
4.	"Mujeres"	Pérez; Adam Horovitz; Rick Rubin	Marc Kinchen	3:06
5.	"Bon, Bon"	Pérez; Renato Carosone; Duncan MacLennan; Sylvester Martinez; Johnson Peterson; Nicola Salerno	Yolanda Be Cool; DCUP; DJ Alvaro	3:35
6.	"Guantanamera (She's Hot)"	Pérez; José Fernández Diaz; Kinchen	DJ Buddha; Kinchen	3:25
7.	"Tu Cuerpo" (featuring Jencarlos)	Pérez; Jencarlos Canela; David Miranda	Jencarlos; David "D-Minor" Miranda	4:04
8.	"Vida 23" (featuring Nayer)	Pérez; William Grigahcine; Clinton Sparks	DJ Snake; Sparks	3:20
9.	"Amorosa" (featuring Papayo and MC Marcinho)	Pérez; Corao; Kinchen; Lazaro Mendez; Vargas	Kinchen; DJ Laz	3:32
10.	"Watagatapitusberry" (remix; featuring Sensato del Patio, Black Point, Lil Jon, and El Cata)	Pérez; Edward Bello; Jonás Ortiz Alberto; William Reyna; Jonathan Smith; Vargas; Daniel Woodis Jr.	DJ Class	3:41
11.	"Orgullo"	Pérez; Scott Rosser; Paul Spencer; Stephen Spencer; Rocco Valdes	Rocco Did It Again!	3:17
12.	"Preguntale"	Pérez; Andrés García; Lionel De La O; Adrian Santalla	DropDeadBeats; García	3:05
Total length:				38:11

Deluxe edition
No.	Title	Length
13.	"Yo Quiero (Mi Alma Se Muere Remix)" (featuring Fuego and Omega)	4:04
14.	"Blanco (Spanish Remix)" (featuring Pharrell)	3:21
Total length:		45:36

== Charts ==
=== Weekly charts ===
Chart (2010)	Peak position
US Billboard 200	65
US Latin Rhythm Albums (Billboard)	1
US Top Latin Albums (Billboard)	2
US Top Rap Albums (Billboard)	6

=== Weekly charts ===
Chart (2011)	Peak position
US Latin Rhythm Albums (Billboard)	3
US Top Latin Albums (Billboard)	13

== Certifications ==
Region	Certification	Certified units/sales
United States (RIAA)	Gold (Latin)	50,000^{^}
^{^} Shipments figures based on certification alone.

== See also ==
- List of number-one Billboard Latin Rhythm Albums of 2010
