= El Cata =

Dominican singer

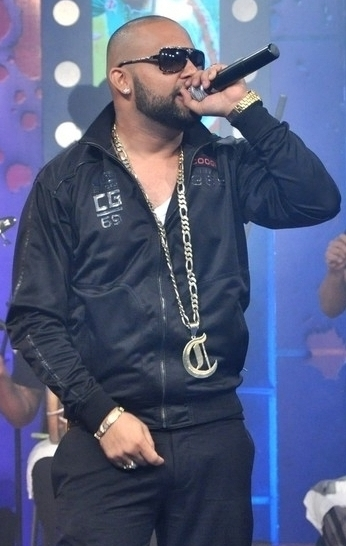
- El Cata in 2018

Background information
- Also known as: El Tigre; El Malo; El Patrón; El Padrino
- Born: Edward E. Bello Pou; Barahona, Dominican Republic
- Genres: Latin music; merengue; hip hop
- Occupations: Singer; songwriter; rapper
- Instrument: Vocals
- Years active: 1999–present
- Labels: Independent-Los Dueños Del Negocio; Lula Records; Ratata Music; Planet (Sony); Farandula Records
- Website: elcatamusic.com (in Spanish)

Edward E. Bello Pou, better known by his stage name El Cata, is a Dominican singer and songwriter, who emerged in the music scene in 1999, born and raised in Barahona, Dominican Republic.

== Early life ==
Bello is the second son of Maria Luisa Pou Betances. He has four sisters. Aged five, he emigrated from the Dominican Republic to Puerto Rico and a year later from PR to Miami, Florida where he lived until he graduated from Miami Beach Senior High School. While at school, Bello spent most of his time in class writing and composing songs. He would walk down the hallways singing the songs that he would write during class.

After high school, Bello moved with his family to New York, where he studied music at the Bronx Community College. While in New York he also worked at a furniture store, as well at the Medicare department for the state, and for HSBC and City bank.

After living in the United States for over 20 years, he returned to the Dominican Republic to make music for the world.

== Career ==
In 1999 he released his first album as an independent artist and label, but these records are not considered officials because they are no longer available. In 2009 he released his official debut studio album El Malo, through Allegro/Planet Records, which includes the singles, "Loca Con Su Tiguere", "Pa' la Esquinita" and "El Que Brilla Brilla" Rabiosa, among others. At the same year he also recorded a remix of "Loca Con Su Tiguere", featuring Julio Voltio and Ñejo & Dalmata, also the remix of "Ella Quiere Coro Conmigo" featuring Yenz, and shared credits on Pitbull's smash single "I Know You Want Me (Calle Ocho)" as co-writer of the song. As of 2010, he collaborated in the remix of "Watagatapitusberry" from Pitbull's album Armando. The song also featured Rapper record-producer Lil Jon, Sensato and Black Point. Also collaborated with Gloria Estefan, Yuri-Mexico, Wyclef J; Kat de Luna, Vakero, Ñejo y Dalmata, Julio Voltio, Secreto EFB; Gente De Zona, Drake, Elvis Crespo, Osmani Garcia, Chacal, Juan Magan, Dylan & Lenny, among others.. (SoundCloud and YouTube for ElCata) This young talent has brought out to market his own line of watches name brand "El Cata" and not only that he also appears as an actor in some movies filmed in the Dominican Republic.

In 2010, Colombian singer-songwriter Shakira covered his single as "Loca", in which he also raps. He is also featured on the Spanish version of the track "Rabiosa" from Shakira's album Sale el Sol.

El Cata is a pioneer of the genre electro-mambow a fusion of merengue with hip-hop. His repertoire has more than one hundred and thirty (130) songs, where about ten (10) of these are hits that have obtained nominations in the international awards for the industry.

== Discography ==
=== Studio albums ===
List of albums, with selected details
Title	Album details
El Malo	Released: October 20, 2009; Label: Allegro/Planet Records; Format: Digital download
El Representante Del Género	Released: To be released; Label: Mr. 305 Inc; Format: Digital download, CD
El Tigre/Chillin-Singles by Singles	Released: To be released; Label: Los Duenos Del Negocio Inc

=== Singles ===
List of singles, with selected chart positions and certifications, showing year released and album name
Year	Single	Peak chart positions		Album
Year	Single	US	US LATIN	Album
2008	"Loca Con Su Tiguere"	—	—	El Malo
2009	"Pa' la Esquinita"	—	—	El Malo
2009	"El Que Brilla Brilla"	—	—	El Malo
2011	"Colesterol de Amor"	—	—	El Representante Del Género
2012-13-14-15 and 16	"No Me Duele" "Como Te Olvido" "Ella Quiere" "Burlao-Rap" "No Me Duele" "Chokala" "Flow Montana"	—	—	El Tigre
2018-24	"Foto De perfil", "CUENTALE", " El Bizcochito"			

=== Featured singles ===
List of featured singles, with selected chart positions and certifications, showing year released and album name
Year	Single	Peak chart positions				Certifications	Album
Year	Single	US	US LATIN	SPA	SWI	Certifications	Album
2009	"Loca Con Su Tigre" (original version) "Rabiosa" "I know you want me (toy pa' ti) among others by El Cata	—	30	—	—	—	Non-album single
2010	"Watagatapitusberry" (Pitbull featuring Lil Jon, Sensato del Patio, Black Point and El Cata)	—	—	—	—	—	Armando
2010	"Loca" (Shakira featuring El Cata)	32	1	1	1	SPA: 2× Platinum; SWI: Platinum	Sale el Sol
2011	"Rabiosa" (Shakira featuring El Cata)	110	8	1	3	—	Sale el Sol
2011	"Wanna be Yours" (PW featuring El Cata)	—	—	—	—	—	Non-album single
2012	"Sobredosis" (Kat DeLuna + El Cata)	—	—	—	—	—	Viva Out Loud
2013	"Con La Ropa Puesta" (Gente De Zona + El Cata)	—	—	—	—	—	
2013-14	"Bailando Por El Mundo" (Juan Magan + El Cata)	—	—	—	—	—	
