= DJ Class =

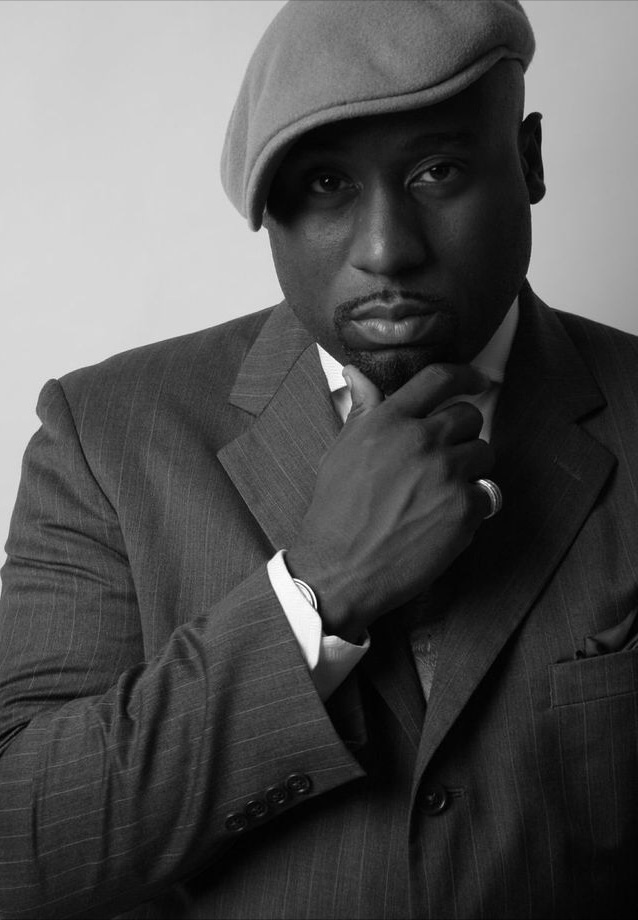

Background information
- Also known as: D. Class
- Born: Daniel Woodis; Baltimore, Maryland
- Genres: Baltimore club, hip hop
- Years active: 1991–2009
- Labels: Unruly Records, Universal Republic Records
- Website: djclass.net

Daniel Woodis, better known by his stage name DJ Class, is an American DJ from Baltimore, Maryland. A veteran of the Baltimore club scene, he started his career in the early 1990s and gained attention with his Unruly Records releases, including the local hit "Tear da Club Up". In 2009, DJ Class scored his most commercially successful single to date with "I'm the Shit", which was remixed by several artists and subsequently became a top 40 Billboard chart hit upon being re-released by Universal Republic Records.

== Musical career ==
=== Early productions ===
Born in Baltimore, Maryland, DJ Class debuted as a DJ and producer in the early 1990s and became closely associated with the emerging Baltimore club scene. He released his debut single in 1991, gaining underground fame with his productions for the Baltimore club label Unruly Records. Among his notable releases at that time were "Wuz Up Baby" (1995) and "Tear da Club Up" (1999), the latter of which became a Baltimore club staple years following its release.

=== Hiatus and commercial success ===
In 2000, DJ Class produced music for the soundtrack to the film Cecil B. Demented. After releasing the single "Next to You" in 2001, Class took a break from producing club music. During this period, he produced a gospel hip hop album entitled The Book of Daniel under the name D. Class. In November 2008, Class re-emerged with a new club single entitled "I'm the Shit" (entitled "I'm the Ish" in censored form). Prior to its release, he had e-mailed the track to Unruly Records owner Shawn Caesar, who responded favorably. The single initially gained airplay solely on Baltimore radio, but later crossed over to radio stations outside of the city. In December 2009, R&B singer Trey Songz and hip hop producer Jermaine Dupri released a remix of the song. The single's success eventually led to DJ Class and Unruly Records signing a deal with Universal Republic Records in January 2009. Rapper Lil Jon, a fan of DJ Class, recorded a remix of the song with him in Atlanta, Georgia, and another remix featuring Kanye West was recorded in Hawaii. Other artists who have contributed to remixes of the song include Pitbull, Estelle, Paula Campbell, Mullyman and PenDragon.

In April 2009, Universal Republic Records released "I'm the Shit" digitally to the iTunes Store. The same month, the Lil Jon remix entered the Billboard Hot Rap Songs chart, where it peaked at number 22 and remained for three weeks. It also peaked at number 26 on the Billboard Rhythmic singles chart. Class was later named the Best Club Music Producer of the year by the Baltimore City Paper and followed "I'm the Shit" with the singles "Dance Like a Freak" and "I Don't Give a Fuck". In 2010, he produced the Pitbull single "Watagatapitusberry"; the following year, he was featured on the single "Favorite DJ" by record producer Clinton Sparks.

== Discography ==
=== Singles ===
List of singles, with selected chart positions, showing year released and album name
| Title | Year | Peak chart positions | | | | Album | | | | | |
| Title | Year | US | US R&B | US Rap | US Rhy. | Album | | | | | |
|---|---|---|---|---|---|---|---|---|---|---|---|
| "Class Is in Session" | 1992 | — | — | — | — | Non-album singles | | | | | |
| "2 Niggas" | 1996 | — | — | — | — | Non-album singles | "The Love Theme" | — | — | — | — |
| "Come Quick See" | — | — | — | — | | Non-album singles | | | | | |
| "Tear da Club Up" | 1999 | — | — | — | — | Non-album singles | | | | | |
| "I'm the Shit" | 2009 | 120 (Note: "I'm the Shit" did not enter the Billboard Hot 100, but peaked at number 20 on the Bubbling Under Hot 100 Singles chart, which acts as an extension to the Hot 100.) | 104 (Note: "I'm the Shit" did not enter the Hot R&B/Hip-Hop Songs chart, but peaked at number four on the Bubbling Under R&B/Hip-Hop Singles chart, which acts as an extension to the R&B/Hip-Hop Songs chart.) | 22 | 26 | Non-album singles | | | | | |
| "Dance Like a Freak" | 2010 | — | — | — | — | Non-album singles | | | | | |
| "I Don't Give a Fuck" | 2010 | — | — | — | — | Non-album singles | | | | | |
| "The Situation" (with Mike "The Situation" Sorrentino, Fatman Scoop and The Disco Fries) | 2010 | — | — | — | — | Non-album singles | | | | | |
| "Favorite DJ" (Clinton Sparks featuring DJ Class and Jermaine Dupri) | 2011 | — | — | — | — | Non-album singles | | | | | |
| "Magic City Christmas" (MC Magic featuring Abrina, DJ Class and Eli Fresh) | 2012 | — | — | — | — | Non-album singles | | | | | |
| "—" denotes a recording that did not chart or was not released in that territory. | | | | | | Non-album singles | | | | | |
