= Maldito Alcohol =

Single by Pitbull featuring Afrojack

from the album Armando
- Language: Spanish
- Released: May 11, 2010
- Recorded: 2009
- Genre: Latin hip hop
- Length: 3:27
- Label: Mr. 305
- Songwriters: Armando Pérez; Nick van de Wall; Urales Vargas
- Producers: Afrojack; DJ Buddha

Pitbull singles chronology
"Watagatapitusberry" (2010)	"Maldito Alcohol" (2010)	"All Night Long" (2010)

Music video
- "Maldito Alcohol" on YouTube

"Maldito Alcohol" (Spanish for Damned Alcohol) is a song by Cuban-American rapper Pitbull from his fifth studio album, Armando. It was released as the album's second official single on October 25, 2010 as a CD single and digital download. It was produced by Afrojack and DJ Buddha.

== Music video ==
The music video was released onto Pitbull's official VEVO channel on December 17, 2010. It has received over 22 million views.

== In popular culture ==
The single was featured in the 2011 game, Saints Row: The Third.

== Charts ==
Chart (2010)	Peak position
US Latin Pop Songs (Billboard)	21

== Release history ==
Region	Date	Format	Label
United States	March 16, 2010	Digital Download	Mr. 305 Records
