= Clinton Sparks =

American DJ and record producer

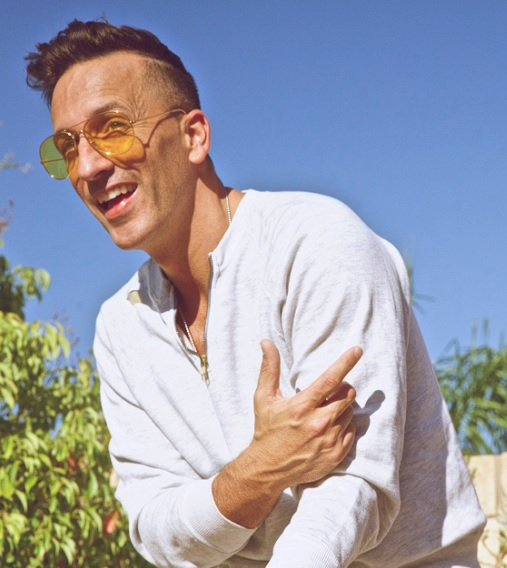
- Sparks in 2018

Background information
- Also known as: DJ Clinton Sparks
- Born: Clinton Charls Sparks; September 18, 1979 (age 47); Boston, Massachusetts, U.S.
- Genres: Hip hop; EDM; pop; rock
- Occupations: DJ; record producer; singer; songwriter; radio personality
- Years active: 1999–present
- Labels: Interscope; Island Def Jam; Photo Finish; Republic; Koch; Fastlife; Compound
- Website: clintonsparks.com

Clinton Charls Sparks (born September 18, 1979) is an American DJ and record producer from Boston, Massachusetts. He initially started his career as a rapper, dancer, producer, and DJ who gained notoriety by making bootleg remixes and mixtapes and parlayed that into hosting radio shows on Boston's Hot 97.7, Baltimore's 92Q, Hartford's Hot 93.7, and Sirius XM's Shade 45 (among others). He was the long-time host of a worldwide syndicated radio show called SmashTime Radio (also referred to as Get Familiar with Clinton Sparks). He is the current host and owner of the national hip hop radio station Get Familiar Radio on Dash Radio, a digital radio platform for which he was vice president from 2016 to 2019.

In 2012, he was nominated for a Grammy for his production work on Lady Gaga's Born This Way. That year, he also won a BMI songwriting award for writing Pitbull's "Shut It Down" and has since won several ASCAP Awards with DJ Snake as part of his Get Familiar Music publishing company. He has written and produced songs for a number of notable acts, including Akon, Ludacris, 2 Chainz, Ty Dolla Sign, Lil Uzi Vert, Big Sean, and numerous others. Sparks has also made music of his own, including the 2005 album, Maybe You Been Brainwashed, and the 2014 EP, ICONoclast. He was featured on the song "Saturday Night," which was featured on the soundtrack for the 2016 stand-up comedy film, Kevin Hart: What Now?.

Additionally, Sparks co-founded the mixtape database, MixUnit.com; was music correspondent for the E! series, The Daily 10 and E! News; and has held executive positions at a variety of companies including Karmaloop, FaZe Clan, Islide, PingTank, IC Realtech, and Dash Radio. In July 2020, Sparks co-founded and became the chief business development officer of the newly formed XSET, an esports and lifestyle gaming organization. He also hosts the Twitch show, Win Big with Clinton Sparks, and authored his first book, How to Win Big in the Music Business, in 2020.

== Early life and education ==
Sparks was born and raised largely in the Dorchester neighborhood of Boston, Massachusetts. His parents got divorced when he was around 4 years old, and he lived with his mother for most of his childhood. He began using his mother's stereo as a turntable at age 10 and began manipulating his favorite parts of recordings to create new songs. When he was 12, he stole his first set of actual turntables and started making music for his groups and local artists. Sparks was a rapper and a dancer who, with his entourage, would win local talent shows.

Around that time, he and his mother moved to the Hyde Park neighborhood in Boston. Run-ins with the law throughout his youth prompted his mother to send him to live with his father in Jr high school, who struggled with alcoholism, in Randolph, Massachusetts. He graduated from Randolph High School.

After high school at age 19, he got a job with UPS and moved back to Dorchester. Eventually, he moved back in to his mother's home and built a recording studio in her basement where he would make original mixtapes and travel up and down the East Coast to hand them out. An injury sustained while working for UPS required Sparks to undergo spinal surgery, severely limiting his ability to perform manual labor. He began focusing more earnestly on music in the aftermath.

== Career ==
=== 1999–2005: Career beginnings with mixtapes, radio shows, and first album ===
From his basement studio at his mother's house, Sparks was able to convince major record labels that he ran a successful online radio show. Around the year 2000, he conducted interviews there with acts like Eminem, Common, Sean Kingston, Talib Kweli, the Wu-Tang Clan, Mobb Deep, the Clipse, and others. He ran the interviews on the radio station where he worked, Boston's Hot 97.7. Sparks was also able to accumulate freestyle raps and performances (usually over his own beats) from these artists that he would put into mixtapes. In 2002, he won the award for New Mixtape DJ of the Year at the Justo Mixtape Awards. By 2004, Sparks was hosting weekly radio shows on Hot 97.7, Baltimore's 92Q, and Hartford, Connecticut's Hot 93.7. He also hosted a syndicated hip hop show, SmashTime Radio, through SupeRadio that aired in 40 cities. That year, he was also named the Radio DJ of the Year at the Mixshow Power Summit Awards.

Also in 2004, Sparks co-founded MixUnit.com, an online mixtape marketplace that ultimately became one of the largest hubs for mixtapes on the internet. He often released his own mixtapes and bootlegs on the site, including a series dubbed SmashTime Blends and several Get Familiar volumes. Acts featured on his tapes have included, The Game, Snoop Dogg, Destiny's Child, T.I., Usher, Ciara, Fat Joe, Cam'ron, Kanye West, Jim Jones, Amerie, Ashanti, Ja Rule, Fabolous, and numerous others. The site helped mixtape DJs like DJ Drama and DJ Khaled accumulate a following. In 2005, Sparks produced the Re-Up Gang's We Got It 4 Cheap mixtapes (both Volume 1 and Volume 2). The Re-Up Gang was composed of both members of the Clipse (Pusha T and No Malice) and two other rappers (Ab-Liva and Sandman). Volume 2 is widely considered a classic, and it also popularized Sparks' vision of the "mixtape-as-album" format.

That year, Sparks began hosting a show on Eminem's Sirius satellite radio channel, Shade 45, and added another weekly show in North Carolina. He also produced The Notorious B.I.G.'s song "Hold Ya Head" featuring Bob Marley off Biggie's posthumous final studio album, Duets: The Final Chapter. In April 2005, Sparks released his own studio album, Maybe You Been Brainwashed, on Koch Records. The lead single, "Run This City," featured P. Diddy and Miri Ben-Ari. Other featured acts on the album included Busta Rhymes, Kardinal Offishall, Jadakiss, Mobb Deep, the Clipse, and others.

=== 2006–2010: Worldwide syndication, The Daily 10 on E!, and further production work ===
In March 2006, Sparks signed a worldwide syndication deal with SupeRadio that took his SmashTime Radio show to Canada, Australia, and Europe. Later that year, he was named a member of the Pepsi DJ Division, a group of DJs who would be brand ambassadors and influencers for the company. In October 2006, he was named Diddy's official tour DJ for his Press Play tour. The two also released an accompanying mixtape entitled Don't Call It A Comeback. In 2007, Sparks produced, co-wrote, and provided vocals for the Akon song, "Sorry, Blame It on Me," which would eventually be certified platinum.

Also in 2007, he was hired by Ben Lyons to become a music correspondent for the E! network series, The Daily 10 and E! News. He also began hosting a weekly "SmashTime Party" presented by E! at the Las Vegas nightclub, Body English located inside the Hard Rock Hotel and Casino. In 2008, he provided production work on Ludacris' "Call Up The Homies" and on the Colby O'Donis album, Colby O. He also co-wrote Beyoncé's "Forever to Bleed" (originally titled "Inevitably"). The song was supposed to appear on her album, I Am... Sasha Fierce, but was kept off after it leaked on the internet.

In 2009, he was featured alongside Jadakiss and Diddy on the Chester French song, "Cîroc Star," becoming an official brand ambassador for the vodka. He would also enter into a promotional partnership with Boston-based online apparel retailer, Karmaloop, a company for which he was director of marketing from 2010 to 2014. Sparks continued writing and producing songs in 2009, including Pitbull's "Shut It Down," for which he won a BMI Songwriting Award. He also worked with T-Pain and Leighton Meester and moved his weekly Las Vegas DJ sets to the newly opened Vanity nightclub in the Hard Rock Hotel. In 2010, Sparks released his first single as lead vocalist entitled "Favorite DJ" featuring DJ Class and Jermaine Dupri. The song was featured on the video game, DJ Hero 2.

=== 2011–2014: New focus as recording artist and ICONoclast ===
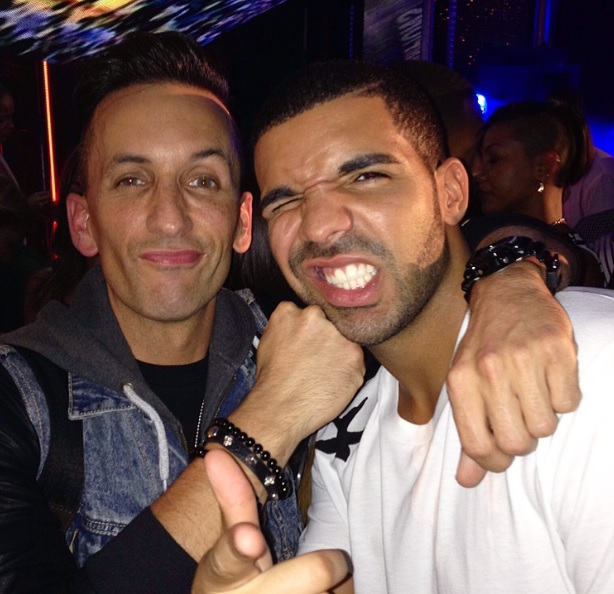
Sparks (left) with Drake

In 2011, he released the single "Sucks to be You" featuring JoJo and LMFAO, started a new weekly residency ("My Awesome Party") at the Moon nightclub in the Palms Casino Resort, and released a new series of mixtapes entitled, My Awesome Mixtape, which featured an introduction from Samuel L. Jackson. He also signed a record deal with Interscope Records and changed the name of his syndicated radio show to My Awesome Radio Show. At the grand opening of his "Awesome Party," Sparks made his entrance by being lowered from a helicopter through the retractable roof of the hotel onto his DJ set. In 2012, he began working on an album with his band, UGHmerica. He also released the song "Watch You" featuring Pitbull on the Strictly Rhythm record label. He received his first Grammy nomination for his production work on Lady Gaga's "Bloody Mary" which appeared on the album, Born This Way.

In 2013, he filmed a music video for his song "Boston Bass" (a bootleg remix of the Dropkick Murphys song, "I'm Shipping Up to Boston") at a Dorchester boxing club. In May of that year, he also released the single, "Gold Rush," featuring 2 Chainz, Macklemore, and D. A. Wallach. The song was accompanied by two videos: an actual video featuring the artists and a spoof "1849 Edition" featuring actors Nick Swardson and Simon Rex. It was the first song he had released after signing to Photo Finish/Island Def Jam. Later that year, he was featured with Teddy Riley on the Bad Rabbits song, "Dance With You," and released another original song, "Turnt Up" featuring RiFF RAFF, 2 Chainz, and Waka Flocka Flame.

In March 2014, he launched a new monthly event called "The Greatest Party On Earth" at the 1 OAK Nightclub in The Mirage. In early 2014, he released the song "Stay With You Tonight" again featuring RiFF RAFF and Lil Debbie. He followed that up with releases of "Shut Up and Go" and "Geronimo" featuring Sage the Gemini, T-Pain, and Ty Dolla Sign before releasing his debut major label EP, ICONoclast, on September 9, 2014. He also went on a mini-tour in support of the album. The EP featured six songs, including the aforementioned "Gold Rush" and "Geronimo" along with "UV Love" featuring T.I. During this time, Sparks also was the Head of Entertainment for the online custom slide retailer, Islide.

=== 2015–present: Business ventures, new singles, and Dash Radio ===
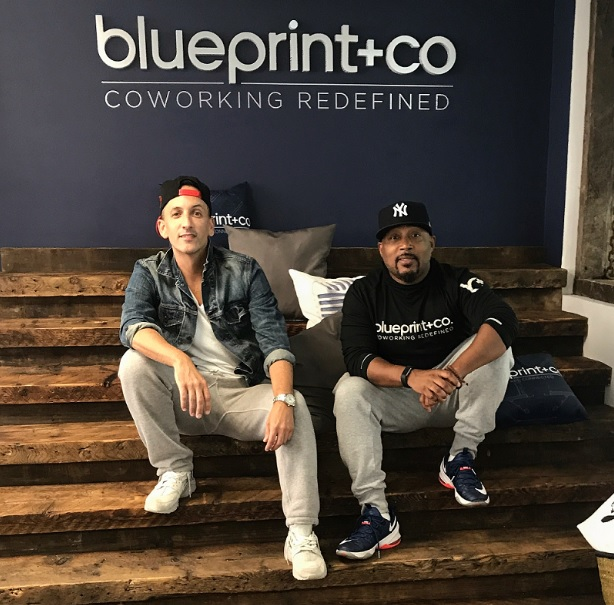
Sparks with Daymond John at blueprint+co

In March 2015, Sparks was named president of PingTank, a tech startup with an app that created animations to layer over photos and videos. He left that company in June to become the CCO and creative director of IC Realtech, a security and surveillance solutions company. In July 2015, he opened a club called "blue" in Marina Bay. He also formed the music publishing company, Get Familiar Music. He is credited with discovering and signing French DJ and producer, DJ Snake, who has won several ASCAP Pop Awards with songs published by Get Familiar. Other acts Sparks has discovered and signed include Tchami, Joey Bandz, and pineappleCITI. In August 2016, he and Joey Bandz were featured on the Chocolate Droppa (Kevin Hart's musical pseudonym) song "Saturday Night". The song would eventually be featured on the soundtrack for the stand-up comedy film, Kevin Hart: What Now?.

In 2017, Sparks began his own branded party ("Get Familiar Fridays") and residency at Club Shrine inside the Foxwoods Resort Casino in Connecticut. In June of that year, Sparks announced that he would start his own station and weekly radio show, Clinton Sparks Radio, on the digital radio platform, Dash Radio. The show and station were later renamed Get Familiar Radio. In September 2017, pineappleCITI—an artist Sparks manages and is credited with discovering—released her self-titled album that featured the Sparks-produced track, "Check On You," which also appeared on her February 2019 studio album, neonBLUE. In October 2017, Sparks released a new single, "Hit My Line," featuring Joey Bandz. In September, he released the single "Think About You" featuring Marc E. Bassy. In 2016, he was named the vice president of business development at Dash Radio and helped the company close an $8.8-million funding round in 2018.

In 2018, Sparks began as director of business development for the esports team, FaZe Clan. As part of his work with FaZe Clan, Sparks helped bring hip hop stars like Yo Gotti, DJ Paul, Pitbull, Swae Lee, and Offset into the esports and gaming sphere as investors and participants. In July 2020, he left FaZe Clan to become the chief business development officer at XSET, a separate gaming organization that he co-founded with Greg Selkoe, Wil Eddins, and Marco Mereu. With XSET, he is responsible for recruiting artists as investors and ambassadors. Swae Lee became the first artist to invest in the company in October 2020.

Also in October 2020, he started a music and business show on Twitch called Win Big with Clinton Sparks. He released his first book, How to Win Big in the Music Business, which features a foreword by Daymond John. The book was originally given away for free as an ebook on its website. In January 2021, Sparks joined Esports Technologies as a strategic advisor.

=== Video games ===
In 2010, he was featured as one of the in-game DJ's in the music video game DJ Hero 2, where his mixes were included alongside other prominent DJ's, providing players with diverse range of hip-hop and electronic music tracks.

Sparks lent his voice to the 2006 action-adventure video game Scarface: The World Is Yours, which is based on the 1983 film Scarface. His involvement added to the game's immersive experience by contributing to its rich audio landscape. He also provided voice work for Saints Row: The Third, the 2011 open-world action game developed by Volition. His participation in the game contributed to its eclectic soundtrack and vibrant in-game radio stations enhancing the overall player experience.

In 2020, he co-founded XSET, an esports and gaming lifestyle organization, where he is the Chief Business Development Officer. Through XSET, Sparks aims to bridge the gap between music, gaming and culture fostering a diverse and inclusive community within the gaming world.

In 2024, he became the CEO of the Global Gaming League, where he focuses on expanding opportunities for gamers worldwide and promoting growth of esports as a mainstream form of entertainment.

== Selected discography ==
=== Studio albums ===
List of studio albums with selected album details
Title	Details
Maybe You Been Brainwashed	Released: March 22, 2005 (US); Label: Koch; Formats: CD, digital download

=== EPs ===
List of EPs with selected album details
Title	Details
Iconoclast	Released: September 9, 2014 (US); Label: Photo Finish, Island Def Jam; Formats: CD, digital download

=== Singles ===
==== As lead artist ====
List of singles as lead artist, with selected chart positions, showing year released and album name
Title	Year	Peak chart positions	Album
Title	Year	US R&B/HH Dig.	Album
"Run This City" (featuring P. Diddy and Miri Ben-Ari)	2005	—	Maybe You Been Brainwashed
"Favorite DJ" (featuring DJ Class and Jermaine Dupri)	2010	—	Non-album singles
"Sucks to Be You" (featuring JoJo and LMFAO)	2011	—	Non-album singles
"Watch You" (featuring Pitbull)	2012	—	Non-album singles
"Gold Rush" (featuring 2 Chainz, Macklemore, and D.A.)	2013	46	Iconoclast
"Stay With You Tonight" (featuring Riff Raff)	2014	—	Non-album singles
"Hit My Line" (featuring Joey Bandz)	2017	—	Non-album singles
"Think About You" (featuring Marc E. Bassy)	2018	—	Non-album singles
"—" denotes a single that did not chart or was not released in that territory.

==== As featured artist ====
List of singles as featured artist showing year released and album name
Title	Year	Album
"Cîroc Star" (Chester French featuring Diddy, Jadakiss, and Clinton Sparks)	2009	Non-album singles
"Dance with You" (Bad Rabbits featuring Clinton Sparks and Teddy Riley)	2013	Non-album singles
"Saturday Night" (Chocolate Droppa featuring Clinton Sparks and Joey Bandz)	2016	Kevin Hart: What Now? (The Mixtape Presents Chocolate Droppa)

=== Songwriting and production ===
Selected production and songwriting credits
Song	Year	Artist	Album	Role	Notes
"Hold Ya Head"	2005	The Notorious B.I.G. (feat. Bob Marley)	Duets: The Final Chapter	Producer	
Various songs	2005	Re-Up Gang	We Got It 4 Cheap Volume 1 and Volume 2	Producer	
"Sorry, Blame It on Me"	2007	Akon	Konvicted	Writer	US #7, Platinum
"Down in tha Dirty"	2007	Ludacris (feat. Bun B and Rick Ross)	Non-album single	Producer	
"Don't Turn Back"	2008	Colby O'Donis	Colby O	Producer	
"Sophisticated Bad Girl"	2008	Colby O'Donis	Colby O	Producer	
"Follow You"	2008	Colby O'Donis	Colby O	Producer	
"Thinkin' Bout Ya"	2008	Colby O'Donis	Colby O	Producer	
"II Trill"	2008	Bun B (feat. Z-Ro and J. Prince)	II Trill	Producer	
"Call Up the Homies"	2008	Ludacris (feat. The Game and Willy Northpole)	Theater of the Mind	Writer	
"Take Me Away"	2009	Tyrese	Non-album single	Producer	
"Shut It Down"	2009	Pitbull (feat. Akon)	Pitbull Starring in Rebelution	Writer, producer	US #42
"She Got It Made"	2010	Plies	Goon Affiliated	Writer, producer	US R&B #30
"Vida 23"	2010	Pitbull (feat. Nayer)	Armando	Writer, producer	
"Boom"	2010	Soulja Boy	The DeAndre Way	Writer, producer	
"She Crazy"	2010	Rick Ross (feat. Aaliyah and Ne-Yo)	Ashes to Ashes	Writer, producer	
"Shake Señora"	2011	Pitbull (feat. T-Pain and Sean Paul)	Planet Pit	Writer, producer	US #69
"Bloody Mary"	2011	Lady Gaga	Born This Way	Producer	
"One More Night"	2011	Jordan Knight	Unfinished	Writer, producer	
"I'm Good"	2015	The Mowgli's	Kids in Love	Writer, producer	
"Check on You"	2017	pineappleCITI	neonBLUE	Producer	

== Nominations and awards ==
Year	Award	Category	Nominee(s)	Result	Ref.
2002	Justo Mixtape Awards	New Mixtape DJ of the Year	Clinton Sparks	Won	
2004	Mixshow Power Summit Awards	Radio DJ of the Year	Clinton Sparks	Won	
2005	Mixshow Power Summit Awards	Satellite Radio DJ of the Year	Clinton Sparks	Won	
2006	Mixshow Power Summit Awards	Syndicated Radio Show of the Year	SmashTime Radio	Won	
2006	Justo Mixtape Awards	Best Club DJ	Clinton Sparks	Won	
2009	Boston Music Awards	Producer of the Year – Pop/R&B	Clinton Sparks	Nominated	
2009	Boston Music Awards	DJ/Electronic Act of the Year	Clinton Sparks	Nominated	
2012	Grammy Award	Album of the Year	Born This Way	Nominated	
2012	BMI Latin Music Awards	Top Latin Songwriter	Clinton Sparks for writing "Shut It Down"	Won	
2013	Boston Music Awards	Producer of the Year	Clinton Sparks	Won	
2014	Boston Music Awards	Producer of the Year	Clinton Sparks	Nominated	
2016	Boston Music Awards	Pop Artist of the Year	Clinton Sparks	Nominated	
2016	ASCAP Pop Music Awards	Pop Song of the Year	DJ Snake for producing "Lean On" (published by Get Familiar Music)	Won	
2016	ASCAP Pop Music Awards	Pop Song of the Year	DJ Snake for producing "You Know You Like It" (published by Get Familiar Music)	Won	
2017	ASCAP Pop Music Awards	Pop Song of the Year	DJ Snake for writing "Let Me Love You" (published by Get Familiar Music)	Won	
2018	ASCAP Pop Music Awards	Pop Song of the Year	DJ Snake for writing "Let Me Love You" (published by Get Familiar Music)	Won	
