= Watagatapitusberry =

2010 single by Pitbull featuring various artists

Single by Pitbull featuring Sensato del Patio, Black Jonas Point, Lil Jon and El Cata

from the album Armando
- Released: March 9, 2010
- Genre: Latin hip hop
- Length: 3:41
- Label: Mr. 305; Sony Music Latin
- Songwriters: Jonas Ortiz Alberto; William Reyna; Edward Bello; Armando Perez; Jonathan Smith; Urales Vargas; William Reynolds
- Producers: K.O El Mas Completo; DJ Class

Pitbull singles chronology
"Armada Latina" (2010)	"Watagatapitusberry" (2010)	"Maldito Alcohol" (2010)

Sensato del Patio singles chronology
"Watagatapitusberry" (2010)	"Latino in Paris" (2011)

El Cata singles chronology
"Ella Quiere Coro Conmigo" (2009)	"Watagatapitusberry" (2010)	"Loca" (2010)

Lil Jon singles chronology
"Give It All U Got" (2009)	"Watagatapitusberry" (2010)	"Ms. Chocolate" (2010)

Music video
- "Watagatapitusberry" on YouTube

"Watagatapitusberry" is a collaborative effort by Black Jonas Point with American recording artist Pitbull, released on March 9, 2010 as the lead single from his fifth studio album, Armando (2010). The song features guest appearances from Dominican rappers Sensato del Patio, El Cata and Black Point, along with Lil Jon. It combines hip hop and "Latin pop-style theatricality".

== Background and composition ==
After the release of Pitbull's then previous album Rebelution (2009), Pitbull released his first Spanish-language album, titled Armando. The first single from this album was "Watagatapitusberry". This song was produced by K.O El Mas Completo & DJ Class . The song is a remix, with the original belonging to Dominican hip hop recording artists Sensato del Patio y Zawezo Junto a Black Point.The Original song was written by Sensato y Zawezo and Black Point.

== Music video ==
The music video was released onto Pitbull's official VEVO channel on March 10, 2010, and has received over 10 million views as of June 2021.

== Credits and personnel ==
- Armando C. Perez – songwriter
- Edward Bello Po – songwriter
- Lil Jon – songwriter
- Daniel Woodis Jr. – songwriter
- Alexis Garcia – songwriter
- William Reyna – songwriter
- DJ Class – producer
- K.O El Mas Completo – producer

== Charts ==
Chart (2010)	Peak position
US Hot Latin Songs (Billboard)	30
US Latin Pop Songs (Billboard)	24
US Latin Digital Songs (Billboard)	4
US Tropical Songs (Billboard)	13

== Release history ==
Country	Date	Format
United States	March 9, 2010	Digital download (promo single)
United States	March 24, 2010	Mainstream radio
