= Vida 23 =

Song by Pitbull featuring Nayer

from the album Armando
- Genre: Latin pop
- Length: 3:20
- Label: Mr. 305; Sony Music Latin
- Songwriters: Clinton Sparks; William Grigahcine; Armando Pérez
- Producers: Clinton Sparks; DJ Snake

"Vida 23" is a song from American rapper Pitbull's fifth studio album, Armando. The song was written by Clinton Sparks, William Grigahcine, Armando Pérez, and it was produced by Clinton Sparks and DJ Snake. The song was solely created for Pitbull's campaign with Dr. Pepper.

== Track listing ==
- Album version
1. "Vida 23" – 3:20

== Credits and personnel ==
- Pitbull – songwriter, vocals
- Nayer - vocals
- Clinton Sparks – songwriter, producer, arranger, instrumentation, recording and mixing
- DJ Snake – producer, arranger and instrumentation
- William Grigahcine – songwriter, keyboards and additional production

== Release history ==
Region	Date	Format	Label
United States	November 2, 2010	Digital Download	Sony Latino, Mr. 305
