= Sensato del Patio =

Dominican rapper

Sensato
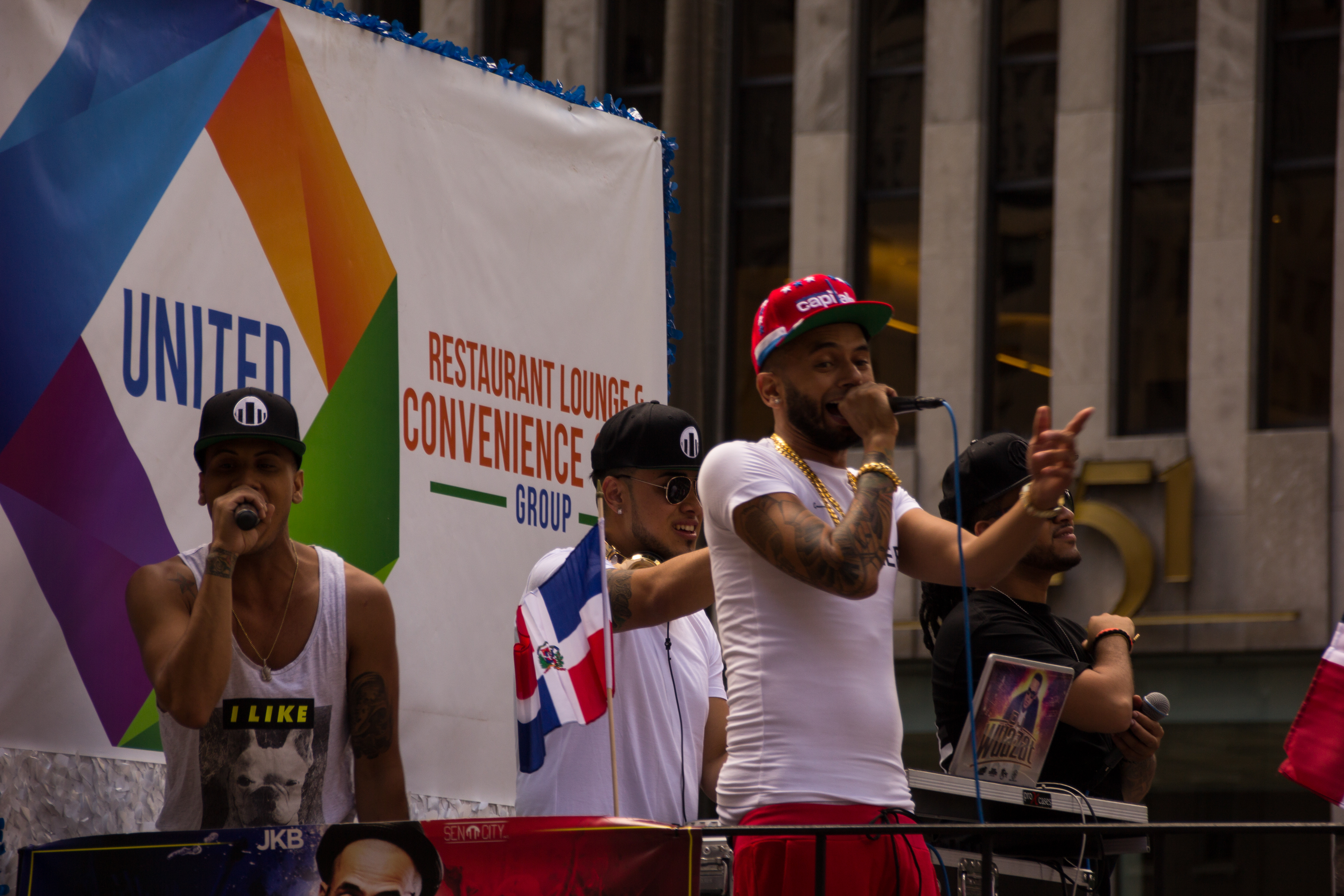
- Left to right: Nikolodian, DJ Wuazat, Sensato del Patio and El Tal Mickey at the Dominican Day Parade (2015)

Background information
- Also known as: Sensato del Patio; El Anunaki; Papa Sensato; Senswagger; SenCity
- Born: William Reyna; March 5, 1984 (age 42); San Cristóbal, Dominican Republic
- Origin: New York City, U.S.
- Genres: Hip hop; Latin
- Occupations: Rapper; songwriter
- Years active: 2004–present
- Website: sensatodelpatio.com

William Reyna (born March 5, 1984), better known by his stage name Sensato del Patio or simply Sensato, is a Dominican rapper based in New York City. He is perhaps best known for collaborating with fellow Caribbean musicians such as Pitbull, Fuego, Black Point and Mozart La Para. He first gained major recognition in 2010, when he released the single "Watagatapitusberry" featuring Black Point and Pitbull.

== Career ==
At the age of 13, William Reyna moved to New York as part of the Dominican diaspora. It was then, in the early 2000s, that he met Zawezo (Alex Garcia) on a basketball court. Discovering that they both shared a huge passion for street rap, they decided to join forces and form the duo Del Patio.

The group began to gain respect in the New York underground scene due to Sensato's versatility with fast rhymes and Zawezo's raw style. Signed by Tiburon Records, a major turning point in their early career occurred when they performed and won a talent competition on the legendary show "Sábado Gigante" with Don Francisco, broadcast on Univision. This massive television exposure opened doors for them internationally.

In 2009, they released their first and only album La Gran Mazana. In the same year, the group created a track originally in the Dominican Republic titled "Watagatapitusberry," a song with a catchy rhythm, purely Dominican slang, and a comedic-urban style that quickly went viral in the streets and nightclubs.The song's fame reached the ears of international rapper Pitbull and crunk producer Lil Jon. Seeing its massive potential, Sensato coordinated and recorded a global remix with Pitbull, Lil Jon, and Black Point. The track exploded on the Billboard charts in 2010, catapulting Sensato to worldwide fame.

The song's massive success also marked the end of the duo. Zawezo publicly stated that irreconcilable differences arose because Sensato put together and negotiated the international remix without notifying or fairly including him and other collaborators on the original concept. Following the remix's release, the relationship completely broke down, and the duo dissolved. Zawezo also claimed to be the creator of Del Patio's essence and to have invested his own money in financing their projects, which led to his separation from Sensato and Tiburon Records.

After the split, Sensato became Pitbull's protégé under his label, Mr. 305 Inc., and experienced his golden age as a solo artist in the international market, characterized by collaborations. He recorded global hits such as "Crazy People" with Pitbull and Sak Noel, "Tu No Lo Sabe" with Melymel and Padrino, "El Mari'o de tu Mujer" with Don Miguelo, "Oh Oh", with Shadow Blow and participated iconically in the massive remix of "El Teke Teke" by Crazy Design and Carlitos Wey. He also worked closely with artists like Fuego, Mozart La Para, and De La Ghetto. He released the album We Ain't Even Supposed 2 B Here (2012), which included hits like "Booty Booty" and "Plata o Plomo" experimenting not only with hip-hop but also with rhythms like street merengue, bachata, and salsa. To maintain his streetwise essence and please his underground audience, he simultaneously released the famous El 28 mixtape trilogy and another mixtapes. In the midst of his success and constant touring.

Sensato's career suffered a drastic pause due to serious health problems. Sensato had suffered from liver problems since his youth and, in 2016, had to undergo a delicate emergency liver transplant in New York, followed by a second surgery due to complications that kept him in critical condition for months. Despite doctors giving him little chance of survival, the rapper miraculously recovered. Although his activity in the industry slowed considerably after this event, he returned to music with more sporadic and nostalgic releases, embracing his status as a pioneering legend who helped globalize the sound of Dominican neighborhoods long before the current dembow and trap boom.

== Discography ==
=== Studio albums ===
- La Gran Manzana: The Album (with Zawezo as Del Patio) (2009)
- We Ain't Even Supposed 2 B Here (with Pitbull) (2013)

=== Mixtapes ===
- El 28: The Mixtape (hosted by DJ Scuff) (2011)
- El 28 Vol. 2: The Mixtape (hosted by Anunaki Game) (2012)
- Senswagger (2013)
- La Parte 3 del 28: The Mixtape (hosted by DJ Danny S) (2014)
- SenCity (2015)
- Me Dieron De Alta Mixtape (2017)

=== Compilations ===
- Probando (2015)
- Proban2: Compilation Vol. 2 (2015)

=== Singles ===
- "Romo Romo" (2010)
- "Golpe De Estado" (2011)
- "Back In Business" (2012)
- "Party" (featuring Sak Noel) (2012)
- "La Confesion" (featuring Pitbull) (2013)
- "Booty Booty" (featuring Pitbull) (2013)
- "Ponte Sensato" (featuring Los Gambinos) (2013)
- "Remember" (featuring Pitbull) (2013)
- "Is This Love" (featuring Papayo & Dynasty) (2013)
- "Plata O Plomo" (featuring Fuego & Jiggy Drama) (2013)
- "Guacamole" (with 8ky 6lu) (2016)
- "Figure It Out" (with 8ky 6lu) (2016)
- "Gloria A Dios"
- "Que Vivan Lo Tiger"
- "Tu No Lo Sabe"
- "El Mario De Tu Mujer"
- "No Me Niegue"
- "Chapiadora"
- "Bello"
- "Back In Business"
- "Racheta"
- "No Te Hagas" (with Pitbull)

=== Featured singles ===
- "Watagatapitusberry – (featuring Pitbull, Black Point, El Cata & Lil Jon) (2010)
- "Que Buena Tu Ta (DR Remix)" – Fuego (featuring Sensato Del Patio, Black Point, Mozart La Para, Los Pepes, Monkey Black & Villanosam) (2010)
- "El Taxi" – Pitbull (Feat. Sensato Del Patio) (2011)
- "Crazy People" – Pitbull (Feat. Sensato & Sak Noel) (2012) (Remix of Noel's 2011 single "Loca People")
- "Global Warming" – Pitbull (Feat. Sensato) (2012)
- "Salud" – Sky Blu (Feat. Sensato, Wilmer Valderrama & Reek Rude) (2013)

=== Guest appearances ===
- "El Sapito" – Villanosam &Mozart La Para (Feat. Sensato Del Patio) (2010)

=== Awards and nominations ===
- Latin Grammy Award – Best Urban Song: "Crazy People" – Nomination
- Billboard Latin Music Award – Digital Song: "El Taxi" – Nomination
