= IAmChino =

Cuban-American DJ (born 1986)

- Born: José Carlos García; 29 March 1986 (age 40); Cuba
- Occupations: DJ, producer, songwriter

José García (born March 29, 1986), better known as IAmChino, is a Cuban-American DJ, record producer, composer and artist known for his contributions to the Latin music scene. Born in Havana in 1986, he caught the attention of Pitbull's manager in 2005. Since then, Garcia has collaborated with various artists, released the album Todo El Tiempo, and songs "Ay Mi Dios" and "Pepas." His album The Most Winning won the Urban Collaboration of the Year at the Premios Lo Nuestro Awards in 2017.

== Early life ==
Jose Garcia was born on March 29, 1986, in Havana, Cuba, and later relocated to the United States.

In 2005, he met Pitbull's manager, Mike Calderón. Calderón was impressed by IamChino's skills. IAmChino expressed his own desire to be part of Calderón's team. The meeting led to his DJ'ing at private events and he started getting attention. Later, he was asked to run the decks at large parties, festivals, and concerts. He began collaborating with several artists and officially joined Pitbull's crew in 2011

== Career ==
He made his debut in the music industry with "Ay Mi Dios" in 2016, featuring Pitbull and Yandel, which topped Billboard's Latin Airplay chart. In 2017, he released his first album Todo El Tiempo, in which he collaborated with Major Lazer, Akon, and Farruko. Since then, he has released several albums and singles. In 2021, he co-produced Pepas, which scaled the Billboard charts in a short duration.

In 2018 Chino collaborated with Daddy Yankee to release “La Rompe Corazones”. The single reached number 1 on Billboard’s Latin Airplay chart. He also released “Mala Mia” featuring Maluma and “Sola” with Becky G under his label D'Leon Records/Sony Music Latin. He also collaborated with Jacob Forever for the song “Hasta Que Se Seque El Malecon” which has been streamed over 150 million times on Spotify. His discography also includes albums Legacy (2018), La Nueva Religion (2020), and El Futuro (2021).

His album titled 'The Most Winning' was featured on Spotify's 'New York City New Music Friday,' Billboard's playlist, 'New Music Worldwide,' and Apple Music's 'New Music Daily Cover.'

- Discoteca (2022)
- Pepas (2021)
- El Incomprendido (2021)

== Awards and nominations ==
=== iHeartRadio Music Awards ===
Year	Work	Award	Result	Ref.(s)
2017	"Ay Mi Dios"	Latin Song of the Year	Nominated	
2017		Best New Latin Artist	Nominated	

Lo Nuestro Award for Collaboration of the Year

Year	Work	Award	Result	Ref.(s)
2017	"Ay Mi Dios"	Urban Collaboration of the Year	Winner	

Premios Monitor Latino

Year	Work	Award	Result	Ref.(s)
2022		Productor Latino Americano	Nominated	

Premios Lo Nuestro

Year	Work	Award	Result	Ref.(s)
2022		DJ of the Year	Nominated	
