= Bon, Bon =

Single by Pitbull

from the album Armando
- Released: August 27, 2010
- Genre: Latin hip hop
- Length: 3:35
- Label: Mr. 305; Sony Music Latin; Ultra Music
- Songwriters: Nicola Salerno; Renato Carosone; Armando Christian Perez; Matthew Handley; Andrew Stanley; Duncan MacLellan
- Producers: Yolanda Be Cool; DCUP; DJ Alvaro

Pitbull singles chronology
"DJ Got Us Fallin' in Love" (2010)	"Bon, Bon" (2010)	"Hey Baby (Drop It to the Floor)" (2010)

Music video
- "Bon, Bon" on YouTube

"Bon, Bon" is a song by Cuban-American rapper Pitbull from his fifth studio album, Armando. It was released as the album's third official single on August 27, 2010. It heavily samples the song "We No Speak Americano" by Yolanda Be Cool & DCUP, which itself samples the 1956 Italian song "Tu vuò fà l'americano" by Renato Carosone, a hit earlier in the year, but it was later known that the version of "We No Speak Americano" used was a bootleg remix done by DJ Alvaro. Pitbull later gave credit to Alvaro and promised that they were looking forward to making more songs together. The single peaked at number 61 on the US Billboard Hot 100 and number three on the US Top Latin Songs.

== Music video ==
The official music video was released onto Pitbull's official Vevo channel on March 22, 2011. It features Pitbull with model Shanna Corrina and special guest stars like Nayer, Sophia Del Carmen and Sagia Castañeda who appeared in the "I Know You Want Me (Calle Ocho)" music video. Madai makes a cameo appearance in the video. The video has received over 177 million views.

== Australian legal dispute ==
In 2012, Pitbull sued DJ Suave from Perth, Western Australia for streaming a remixed version of "Bon, Bon" on his website featuring an audio drop in which Pitbull says "Mr. 305 and I am putting it right down with DJ Suave." The drop was recorded to promote a 2008 Australian tour that ultimately did not go ahead, and Pitbull argued that when used out of context this was damaging to his reputation by implying that DJ Suave was a subject of the song. DJ Suave was simultaneously attempting to sue Pitbull in the NSW Supreme Court for cancelling the 2008 tour, which Pitbull's promoter said he did because he was not paid in full on time. Pitbull and his legal team were successful in the Federal Magistrates Court of Australia and DJ Suave was ordered to pay $12,312 in damages. The case is notable as a rare example of the enforcement of moral rights in Australian copyright law. DJ Suave's simultaneous attempt to sue Pitbull for cancelling the tour was not successful. In 2016, DJ Suave was fatally stabbed during an argument over an misplaced envelope of cocaine. A jury determined this had occurred in self-defence.

== Track listing ==
1. "Bon, Bon" (Album Version) – 3:35
2. "Bon, Bon" (Radio Edit) – 3:06
3. "Bon, Bon" (English Version) – 3:36

== Credits and personnel ==
- Armando C. Perez – songwriter
- Nicola Salerno - songwriter, arranger, instrumentation, recording and mixing
- DJ Alvaro - producer, keyboards, arranger, instrumentation, recording and mixing
- Andrew Stanley - songwriter
- Matthew Handley - songwriter
- Duncan MacLellan - songwriter

== Charts ==
=== Weekly charts ===
Chart (2010–11)	Peak position
Austria (Ö3 Austria Top 40)	36
Germany (GfK)	39
Israel International Airplay (Media Forest)	8
Poland (Dance Top 50)	38
Spain (Promusicae)	38
Switzerland (Schweizer Hitparade)	47
US Billboard Hot 100	61
US Hot Latin Songs (Billboard)	3
US Latin Pop Airplay (Billboard)	3
US Latin Rhythm Airplay (Billboard)	2

=== Year-end charts ===
Chart (2011)	Position
US Hot Latin Songs (Billboard)	12

== Certifications ==
Region	Certification	Certified units/sales
Mexico (AMPROFON)	Gold	30,000^{*}
United States (RIAA)	Gold	500,000^{‡}
^{*} Sales figures based on certification alone.^{‡} Sales+streaming figures based on certification alone.
