= Black Jonas Point =

Dominican rapper (born 1989)

- Born: Jonás Joaquín Ortiz Alberto; January 24, 1989 (age 37); Santo Domingo, Dominican Republic
- Genre: Hip hop
- Occupations: Rapper; singer; songwriter; record producer
- Instruments: Vocals; piano
- Years active: 2000–present
- Label: Orfanato Music Group

Jonás Joaquín Ortiz Alberto (born 1989), is better known by his stage name Black Jonas Point (credited as Black Jonas Point) is a Dominican rapper, songwriter and producer from Santo Domingo.

== Music career ==
Ortiz, along with Del Patio, wrote and performed on the Pitbull song "Watagatapitusberry", which reached number 30 in the US Billboard Latin Songs chart and number 13 in the US Billboard Tropical Songs chart.

Ortiz performed during the 2010 Puerto Rican Day Parade in New York City.

== Discography ==
=== Singles ===
- 2010 - Watagatapitusberry

=== Mixtape ===
- 2010 - Te Dio Pa Eso
