= I Know You Want Me (Calle Ocho) =

Single by Pitbull

from the album Pitbull Starring in Rebelution
- Language: English; Spanish
- Released: February 24, 2009
- Recorded: 2008
- Genre: Hip hop; Eurodance
- Length: 3:57; 3:41 (Radio Edit); 2:44 (Short Radio Edit)
- Label: The Orchard; Ultra; J; Polo Grounds; Mr. 305
- Songwriters: Armando Peréz; Edward Bello; Daniel Seraphine; David Wolinski; Nicola Fasano; Patrick Gonella; Stefano Bosco
- Producers: Fasano; Pitbull

Pitbull singles chronology
"Shooting Star (Party Rock Remix)" (2009)	"I Know You Want Me (Calle Ocho)" (2009)	"Blanco" (2009)

Music video
- "I Know You Want Me (Calle Ocho)" on YouTube

"I Know You Want Me (Calle Ocho)" is a song by American rapper and singer Pitbull released as the second single from his fourth album, Pitbull Starring in Rebelution. The song samples "75, Brazil Street" by Nicola Fasano and Pat Rich, which itself samples the opening horns riff from "Street Player" by Chicago. The core is from a song by Dominican rappers El Cata and Omega. The title is a reference to Calle Ocho, a street in Miami's Little Havana neighborhood.

The song premiered on the Miami radio station WPOW. It has also been featured in Dance Central, the Xbox 360 Kinect-based dancing game, Dance Dance Revolution X2 for PlayStation 2, the PlayStation 3 PlayStation Move-based dancing game SingStar Dance, and in the pilot of Suburgatory. It received a nomination a Latin Rhythm Airplay Song of the Year at the 2010 Latin Billboard Music Awards.

== Composition ==
""I Know You Want Me (Calle Ocho)""
30-second sample of "I Know You Want Me (Calle Ocho)" featuring the chorus

"I Know You Want Me (Calle Ocho)" is an uptempo syncopated hip hop groove with clear vocals on the chorus and a pop hook, within a tribal house-oriented beat. The song is set in common time with a moderate tempo of 128 beats per minute and is written in the key of D minor. Pitbull's vocal range spans from C_{4} to Bb_{4}. The song is a vocal mix of "75, Brazil Street" by Nicola Fasano Vs Pat-Rich, which itself samples "Street Player" by Chicago.

== Critical reception ==
The song received mixed reviews with Billboard.com editor Michael Menachem giving the single a favorable review:

"Pitbull delivers some Little Havana to the club scene with "I Know You Want Me (Calle Ocho)." The clever meshing of reggaetón with Euro dance music signals what looks like a multiformat smash. At the core is an acoustic guitar and a sizzling rhythm, with hot horns in the form of a sample that just keeps on giving: Chicago's "Street Player," which appeared in the '90s techno hit "The Bomb" by the Bucketheads. Mainstream radio missed out on Pitbull's previous single "Krazy," featuring Lil Jon, but "Calle Ocho" is already on the top half of the Billboard Hot 100, and the temperature on the street and in the clubs is rising".

Fraser McAlpine of the BBC also favored it. He said it was meant to be sexy given how Pitbull performed the verses, but is fun and 'more gigglesome than wrigglesome', and wondered if its effect would vary between listeners of different genders:

"I don't know if it has a different effect on The Ladies, but I'm basically fine with a pumped up dance version of a very familiar piece of music, with a funny man on the top shouting about how aroused he is and occasionally counting on his fingers."

== Chart performance ==
"I Know You Want Me (Calle Ocho)" is Pitbull's first single to become an international hit. The single peaked at number two on the US Billboard Hot 100 for one week, on the week of June 20, 2009. The song was Pitbull's highest-peaking single until "Give Me Everything" hit number one; it also became his third top-ten hit. The song also reached number one on the French Singles Chart and number four on the US Mainstream Top 40 radio. On November 11, 2009, the single was certified double platinum by the Recording Industry Association of America (RIAA) for sales of over two million digital copies. As of June 2011, the song has sold 3.2 million digital copies in the United States.

In the United Kingdom, the single debuted at number 53 then raising to number 28 the following week; in the third week it reached number 13 and in the fourth week, it reached number nine giving Pitbull his first top-ten single in the UK. The following week it moved up again to number seven, peaking at number four a week later. In Australia, the song peaked at number six on the Australian Singles Chart, making it his first song to hit the top 10 there, while in Spain the song reached number one and has been certified triple platinum with sales of over 120,000 units. In New Zealand, the song peaked at number three and was certified platinum, selling over 15,000 copies.

== Music video ==
The music video was first released to YouTube on March 9, 2009, by Ultra Music and was directed by David Rousseau and produced by Alexandra Sdoucos. It features Pitbull, Nayer (wearing a peaked cap), and Miami-based models Sagia Castañeda, Angelica Casañas and New Jersey-based Maria Milian. It has received over 286 million views even though this particular upload is not available for worldwide viewership due to licensing restrictions in certain countries.

"I Know You Want Me (Calle Ocho)" was the number one most viewed music video on YouTube in 2009. The video received 82 million views, easily beating out the second and third most viewed videos both by Disney star (at the time) Miley Cyrus, "The Climb" (64 million views) and "Party in the U.S.A." (54 million views).

The official music video version (without Ultra Music identifiers) was released onto Pitbull's official Vevo channel on May 25, 2011. It received over 3 million views even though this particular upload was not available for worldwide viewership, again due to licensing restrictions in certain countries. The video has since been removed from YouTube.

== Charts ==
=== Weekly charts ===
Chart (2009–2010)	Peak position
Australia (ARIA)	6
Austria (Ö3 Austria Top 40)	3
Belgium (Ultratop 50 Flanders)	1
Belgium (Ultratop 50 Wallonia)	1
Canada Hot 100 (Billboard)	2
Canada CHR/Top 40 (Billboard)	1
CIS Airplay (TopHit)	2
Croatia International Airplay (HRT)	5
Czech Republic Airplay (ČNS IFPI)	2
Denmark (Tracklisten)	6
European Hot 100 Singles (Billboard)	1
Finland (Suomen virallinen lista)	2
France (SNEP)	1
Germany (GfK)	8
Global Dance Tracks (Billboard)	2
Hungary (Rádiós Top 40)	4
Ireland (IRMA)	5
Israel International Airplay (Media Forest)	1
Italy (FIMI)	6
Italy Airplay (EarOne)	30
Luxembourg Digital Song Sales (Billboard)	2
Mexico Anglo Airplay (Monitor Latino)	1
Netherlands (Dutch Top 40)	1
Netherlands (Single Top 100)	2
New Zealand (Recorded Music NZ)	3
Norway (VG-lista)	5
Perú (UNIMPRO)	4
Poland Dance (ZPAV)	16
Romania (Romanian Top 100)	1
Russia Airplay (TopHit)	2
Romania Airplay (Media Forest)	1
Romania TV Airplay (Media Forest)	1
Scottish Singles Sales (Official Charts)	3
Slovakia Airplay (ČNS IFPI)	23
Spain (Promusicae)	1
Sweden (Sverigetopplistan)	3
Switzerland (Schweizer Hitparade)	2
Ukraine Airplay (TopHit)	36
UK Singles (Official Charts)	4
US Billboard Hot 100	2
US Hot Latin Songs (Billboard)	6
US Hot R&B/Hip-Hop Songs (Billboard)	86
US Hot Rap Songs (Billboard)	4
US Digital Song Sales (Billboard)	2
US Dance Club Songs (Billboard)	27
US Pop Airplay (Billboard)	4
US Rhythmic Airplay (Billboard)	5

Chart (2026)	Peak position
Lithuania (AGATA)	46

=== Monthly charts ===
Chart (2009)	Position
Brazil (Brasil Hot 100 Airplay)	78

=== Year-end charts ===
Chart (2009)	Position
Australia (ARIA)	21
Austrian Singles Chart	18
Belgium (Flanders) Singles Chart	13
Belgium (Wallonia) Singles Chart	19
Brazil (Crowley)	83
Canadian Hot 100	7
Croatia International Airplay (HRT)	38
Dutch Singles Chart	23
Dutch Singles Top 100	18
France (SNEP)	7
German Singles Chart	37
Hungary (Rádiós Top 40)	28
Italy (FIMI)	26
New Zealand Singles Chart	20
Russia Airplay (TopHit)	20
Spanish Singles Chart	3
Swedish Singles Chart	24
Swiss Singles Chart	11
UK Singles Chart	59
US Billboard Hot 100	17
US Hot Latin Songs (Billboard)	20
US Mainstream Top 40 (Billboard)	27
US Rhythmic (Billboard)	11
Chart (2010)	Position
Hungarian Airplay Chart	55
Russia Airplay (TopHit)	78

=== Decade-end charts ===
Decade-end chart performance for "I Know You Want Me (Calle Ocho)"
Chart (2000–2009)	Position
Russia Airplay (TopHit)	152

== Certifications ==
Region	Certification	Certified units/sales
Australia (ARIA)	Platinum	70,000^{^}
Belgium (BRMA)	Gold	
Canada (Music Canada)	4× Platinum	320,000^{‡}
Denmark (IFPI Danmark)	Platinum	90,000^{‡}
Germany (BVMI)	Gold	150,000^{^}
Italy (FIMI)	Platinum	100,000^{‡}
Netherlands (NVPI)	Gold	10,000^{^}
New Zealand (RMNZ)	2× Platinum	60,000^{‡}
Spain (Promusicae)	3× Platinum	120,000^{*}
Spain (Promusicae) Since 2015	Gold	30,000^{‡}
Switzerland (IFPI Switzerland)	Gold	15,000^{^}
United Kingdom (BPI)	Platinum	600,000^{‡}
United States (RIAA)	2× Platinum	2,500,000
^{*} Sales figures based on certification alone.^{^} Shipments figures based on certification alone.^{‡} Sales+streaming figures based on certification alone.

== See also ==
- List of best-selling Latin singles
