= Pitbull (rapper) =

American rapper (born 1981)

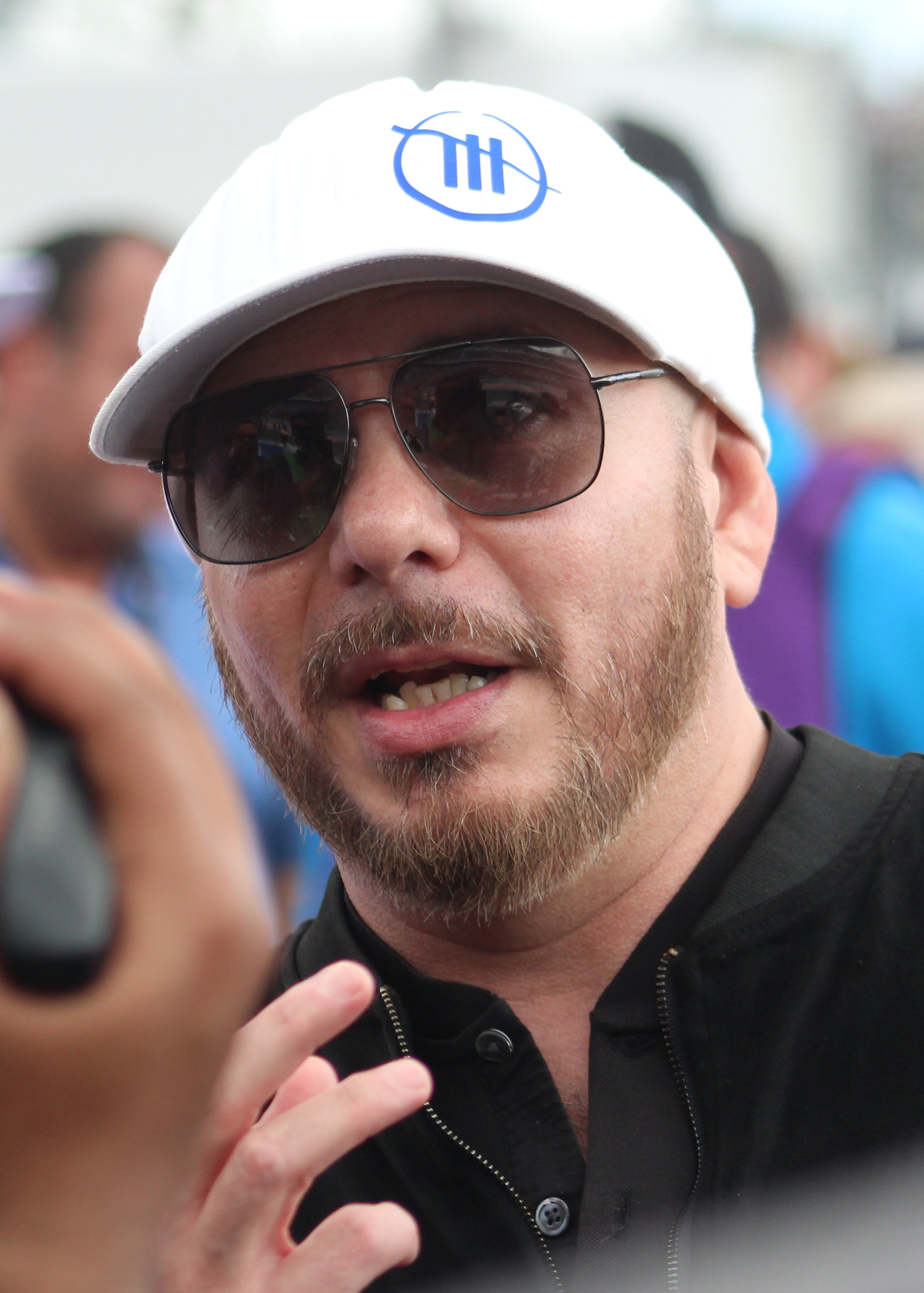
- Pitbull in 2023
- Born: Armando Christian Pérez; January 15, 1981 (age 45); Miami, Florida, U.S.
- Other names: Mr. 305; Mr. Worldwide
- Occupations: Rapper; singer; songwriter; businessman; actor
- Years active: 1998–present
- Works: Discography
- Awards: Full list
- Musical career
- Genres: Hip-hop; Latin hip-hop; reggaeton; pop rap; pop; crunk (early)
- Instrument: Vocals
- Labels: RCA; Polo Grounds; Mr. 305 Inc.; Sony Latin; Radical by The Orchard; Poe Boy; Bad Boy Latino; Ultra; J; TVT; Luke
- Website: pitbullmusic.com

Armando Christian Pérez (born January 15, 1981), known professionally as Pitbull, is an American rapper, singer, songwriter, and actor. He began his career in the early 2000s as a reggaeton, Latin hip-hop, and crunk performer, and signed with TVT Records to release his debut album, M.I.A.M.I. (2004). Executive produced by Lil Jon, the album entered the Billboard 200 along with his second and third albums, El Mariel (2006) and The Boatlift (2007). His fourth album, Pitbull Starring in Rebelution (2009), yielded his mainstream breakthrough, spawning the singles "I Know You Want Me (Calle Ocho)" and "Hotel Room Service"—which peaked at numbers two and eight on the U.S. Billboard Hot 100, respectively.

After rebranding himself as a pop artist, Pitbull's sixth and seventh albums, Planet Pit (2011) and Global Warming (2012) were both met with continued commercial success; the former spawned his first Billboard Hot 100-number one single "Give Me Everything" (featuring Ne-Yo, Afrojack and Nayer), while the latter spawned the top ten hit "Feel This Moment" (featuring Christina Aguilera). His 2013 single, "Timber" (featuring Kesha), became his second song to peak the chart, and did so in 18 other countries. His 2014 single, "Time of Our Lives" (with Ne-Yo), peaked within the chart's top ten and led his eighth album, Globalization (2014). That same year, he performed the song "We Are One (Ole Ola)" (with Jennifer Lopez and Claudia Leitte), which served as the official theme of the 2014 FIFA World Cup. Meanwhile, Pitbull made numerous guest appearances on a number of hit songs, including the Billboard Hot 100-top four singles "I Like It" by Enrique Iglesias, "DJ Got Us Fallin' in Love" by Usher, and "On the Floor" by Jennifer Lopez.

Dale (2015), Pitbull's ninth album and first Spanish-language album in almost five years, won the Grammy Award for Best Latin Rock, Urban or Alternative Album in 2016. His eleventh album and first independent release, Libertad 548 (2019) focused on Latin hip-hop and was led by the singles "No Lo Trates" (with Daddy Yankee and Natti Natasha) and "Me Quedaré Contigo" (featuring Ne-Yo). His twelfth album, Trackhouse (2023), delved further into Latin influences.

Pitbull has sold over 25 million studio albums and over 100 million singles worldwide. He has over 15 billion views on YouTube as of May 2020. He was ranked by Billboard as the 45th Top Artist of the 2010s and the 24th Top Latin Artist of the 2010s. Pitbull's other ventures include brand ambassadorship and for various entities, activism and philanthropy in Latino American communities, a radio station—Pitbull's Globalization—on Sirius XM Radio, and ownership of the Trackhouse Racing NASCAR team. As of 2026, Pitbull has also won a Latin Grammy Award, two Billboard Music Awards, and nine Billboard Latin Music Awards.

== Early life and background ==
Armando Christian Pérez was born on January 15, 1981, in Miami, Florida, to Cuban immigrant parents. While growing up, he was strongly encouraged by his family to "take advantage" of the privilege of living in America, and the opportunities that came with it. His family has a history of fighting against the Castro regime in Cuba. When he was three, he could recite the works of Cuban national hero and poet José Martí in Spanish. He learned English by watching Sesame Street as a child.

His father was largely absent from his childhood; his parents separated when he was young, and he was raised mostly by his mother, later stating: "my mom is my father and my mother." He briefly stayed with a foster family in Roswell, Georgia. His parents struggled with substance abuse; as a teenager, he was also involved with drug use and dealing, which eventually led to him getting kicked out of the family house.

He attended South Miami Senior High School and Miami Coral Park High School. One of his teachers, Hope Martinez, noticed his talent and got him an invitation to a DMX video shoot. He credits her for his success and says she changed his life. While growing up, he was influenced by the Miami bass genre of pop music and has cited Celia Cruz and Willy Chirino as sources of inspiration, in addition to rappers such as Nas, Jay-Z, and Snoop Dogg. He stated that Miami's melting pot characteristics exposed him to various cultures which influenced his artistry and himself as a person.

It's a melting pot. [...] I've grown up in good neighborhoods, bad neighborhoods, worse neighborhoods. But growing up around so many cultures, it's always allowed me to think out of the box and try new sounds and try new things. You learn something new from every culture, just like I learn something new from every record.

— Pitbull in 2019

== Career ==
=== 1998–2003: Luke Records and TVT Records ===
He said he chose his stage name of Pitbull because the dogs "bite to lock. The dog is too stupid to lose. And they're outlawed in Dade County. They're basically everything that I am. It's been a constant fight". Around the age of seventeen, Pitbull met manager Irv Gotti and was advised to go from only freestyle rapping to writing records.

In 2001, Pitbull was signed to Luther Campbell's Luke Records by Jullian Boothe, then the label's vice-president of A&R. Pitbull worked with Uncle Luke during his early career, being featured on Luke's 2001 album Somethin' Nasty, including the single "Lollipop" along with Lil' Zane. In 2001, Pitbull was introduced to Robert Fernandez of Famous Artist Music & Management, an independent label and management company specializing in developing artists, by the Diaz Brothers, a producer duo signed to the company. Fernandez "saw the eagerness and hunger he had" and, with the Luke Records deal ending, began working to develop Pitbull. Together they focused on creating a more radio-friendly sound. Fernandez later told HitQuarters: "At that time his music had a lot of verses and took a long time to get into the hook, and so we took time in getting the songs catchier and less on the rap side."

Fernandez introduced Pitbull to Lil Jon in Miami, hoping to secure the rapper a small guest intro spot on Lil Jon's upcoming album Kings of Crunk. According to Fernandez, Jon took a liking to Pérez and offered him a track on the album; it is called "Pitbull's Cuban Ride Out". This track helped raise the young rapper's profile. Pitbull was featured on Lil Jon and the East Side Boyz' album Kings of Crunk in 2002. Pitbull's song "Oye" was featured on the soundtrack to the film 2 Fast 2 Furious the following year. In addition, Pitbull released several mixtapes, composed of freestyles and remixes of popular rap music.

=== 2004–2005: M.I.A.M.I. ===
In 2004, Pitbull released his debut album M.I.A.M.I., with the lead single being "Culo" produced by Lil Jon and the Diaz Brothers. It peaked at No. 32 on the Billboard Hot 100 chart and No. 11 on the Hot Rap Tracks chart. Other singles included "Dammit Man", "Back Up", "Toma", and "That's Nasty" (both featuring Lil Jon). He joined the Anger Management Tour, the 2000 hip-hop concert tour headlined by Eminem and 50 Cent. Pitbull also appeared on the Ying Yang Twins' single "Shake", which peaked at No.41 on the Hot 100 and No.12 on the rap chart, Adassa's chart topping single "Kamasutra" & Twista's "Hit the Floor" (#94 Hot 100, No. 20 Rap). The remix album Money Is Still a Major Issue was released in November 2005; it included new track "Everybody Get Up", a duet with hip-hop/R&B group Pretty Ricky.

TVT Records, Pitbull's label at the time, and Slip-n-Slide Records disputed over the release of Welcome to the 305, an unreleased album by Slip-n-Slide that Pitbull recorded in 2001. A Miami judge ruled that Slip-n-Slide had a legal right to release the album as it was recorded when Pitbull was a Slip-N-Slide artist, and prior to him signing with TVT Records. A US District Court judge affirmed the decision further. TVT was then ordered in March 2007 to pay Slip-n-Slide $9.1 million for attempting to block the album's release to record stores and digital download entities.

In 2005, Pitbull and rapper Sean "Diddy" Combs co-founded Bad Boy Latino, a subsidiary of Combs's Bad Boy Records label. It primarily focuses on Latin hip-hop, Latin soul, Latin pop and other tropical music and has offices in New York and Miami. Along with co-founding it, Pérez currently heads the A&R division of the label.

=== 2006–2007: El Mariel and The Boatlift ===
In January 2006, Pitbull guest-starred in UPN's South Beach. Pitbull recorded "Nuestro Himno" in collaboration with Wyclef Jean, Carlos Ponce, and Olga Tañón. On Listennn... the Album, the debut album by Terror Squad member and Miami radio personality DJ Khaled, Pitbull performed on three singles: "Holla at Me" and "Born-N-Raised" alongside other Southern-based rappers.

He dedicated the album to his father, who died in May that year. Along with the usual party-oriented tracks, Pitbull also included politically themed tracks in El Mariel. The album was released on October 31, 2006, and included singles "Bojangles", "Ay Chico (Lengua Afuera)", "Fuego", and duet with Puerto Rican singer Ken-Y, "Dime (Remix)". El Mariel topped the Billboard independent albums chart and peaked at No. 17 on the Billboard 200 and No. 2 on the rap chart. In 2011, a "Bojangles" remix was released featuring DJ Lady Tribe, who he toured with at the 2005, Hot Import Nights tour.

Pitbull's third album, titled The Boatlift, was released on November 27, 2007, spawned by the single "Secret Admirer" featuring Lloyd on the chorus. Earlier, Pitbull announced that this album would have a more gangsta rap edge than his earlier albums. Subsequent singles included "Go Girl" featuring Trina, and "The Anthem" featuring and produced Lil Jon, that song sampling the hook from the song "El Africano" by Wilfrido Vargas and the beat from the song "Calabria" by Rune RK. "Go Girl" peaked at No. 80 on the Billboard Hot 100 and No. 36 on the Hot Rap Tracks chart; "The Anthem" No. 36 on the Hot 100 and No.11 on the Hot Rap Tracks.

His variety show, Pitbull's La Esquina, debuted May 2007 and ran through 2009 on the mun2 cable network.

Pitbull also appeared on DJ Laz' "Move Shake Drop" and DJ Felli Fel's "Feel It".

=== 2008–2010: Pitbull Starring in Rebelution and Armando ===
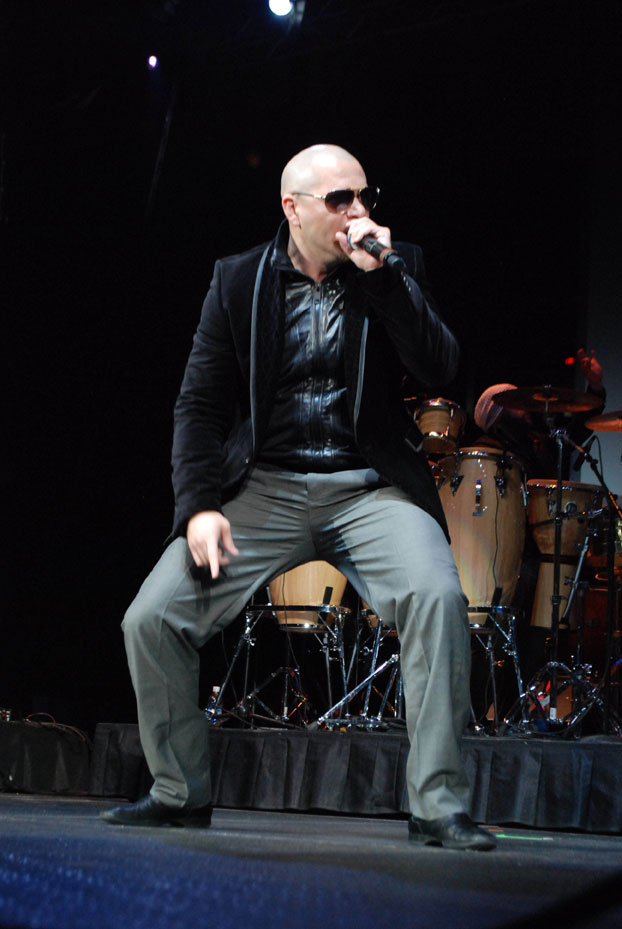
Pitbull performing at the Allstate Arena, B96 Jingle Bash, Chicago

For his fourth studio album Pitbull Starring in Rebelution, Pitbull released "I Know You Want Me (Calle Ocho)" through Ultra Records after his former label TVT Records went out of business. "Krazy" peaked at No. 30 on the Hot 100 and No. 11 on the Hot Rap Tracks charts. "I Know You Want Me" peaked at No. 2 on the Hot 100 and peaked within the top ten spots of charts in the United Kingdom, Canada, Italy, and the Netherlands. The song reached No. 1 in France and the European Hot 100 in the week ending August 29, 2009, according to Billboard magazine. "I Know You Want Me" ended at position 17 on the Billboard Year-End Hot 100 singles of 2009. He later signed with Polo Grounds Music through Sony Music and created his own label Mr. 305 Inc. The single "Hotel Room Service", which samples "Push the Feeling On", peaked at No. 9 on the Hot 100. The album went on to sell over 7.5 million worldwide digital singles and albums combined.

On their second collaboration since "Go Girl", Pitbull appeared on the debut single of rapper David Rush (formerly Young Bo$$), "Shooting Star", also with Kevin Rudolf and LMFAO. An amateur video of Pitbull punching a disruptive audience member at a Colorado concert leaked onto the Internet in late May 2009. Pitbull explained to MTV News that it was because the fan kept throwing cash around the stage, and after Pitbull pulled him up to the stage, he threw a stash of money right in Pitbull's face.

He was tapped by the Miami Dolphins to work alongside T-Pain and Jimmy Buffett to release a new fight song for the Dolphins. The city of Miami granted Pitbull a "Key to the City" honor on August 19, 2009. Another popular single from 2009 was "Blanco", featuring Pharrell Williams of The Neptunes from the soundtrack to the movie Fast & Furious. Pitbull recorded a remix with Mexican pop diva Paulina Rubio for her single "Ni Rosas Ni Juguetes" in November 2009.

In 2010, Pitbull performed the rap section in the Haiti benefit song "Somos El Mundo", a Spanish version of "We Are the World", that included a huge group of Latin artists led by Emilio and Gloria Estefan. He was also a featured guest on Janet Jackson's "Heart, Beat, Love" in addition to "Armada Latina", the fourth single off the album Rise Up by Latin rap legends, Cypress Hill. The song was produced by Jim Jonsin and also features American salsa singer Marc Anthony. Pitbull then collaborated with Alexandra Burke on the single "All Night Long". He was also featured on "DJ Got Us Fallin' in Love" by Usher.

Pitbull released his full-length debut Spanish-language album titled Armando on November 2, 2010. He was also one of the most nominated artists of the 2011 Billboard Latin Music Awards. He garnered seven nominations for "Latin Rhythm Airplay, Song of the Year" for "Bon, Bon"; "Latin Rhythm Airplay, Artist of the Year, Solo Artist"; "Latin Rhythm Albums, Album of the Year" for Armando; "Latin Rhythm Albums, Artist of the Year, Solo Artist"; "Social 50, Latin Artist of the Year"; "Latin Digital Download of the Year" for "Bon, Bon" and "Hot Latin Song of the Year, Vocal Event" for the song "I Like It" alongside Enrique Iglesias. He also won Telehit's award for "Most Popular Artist".

=== 2011: Planet Pit ===
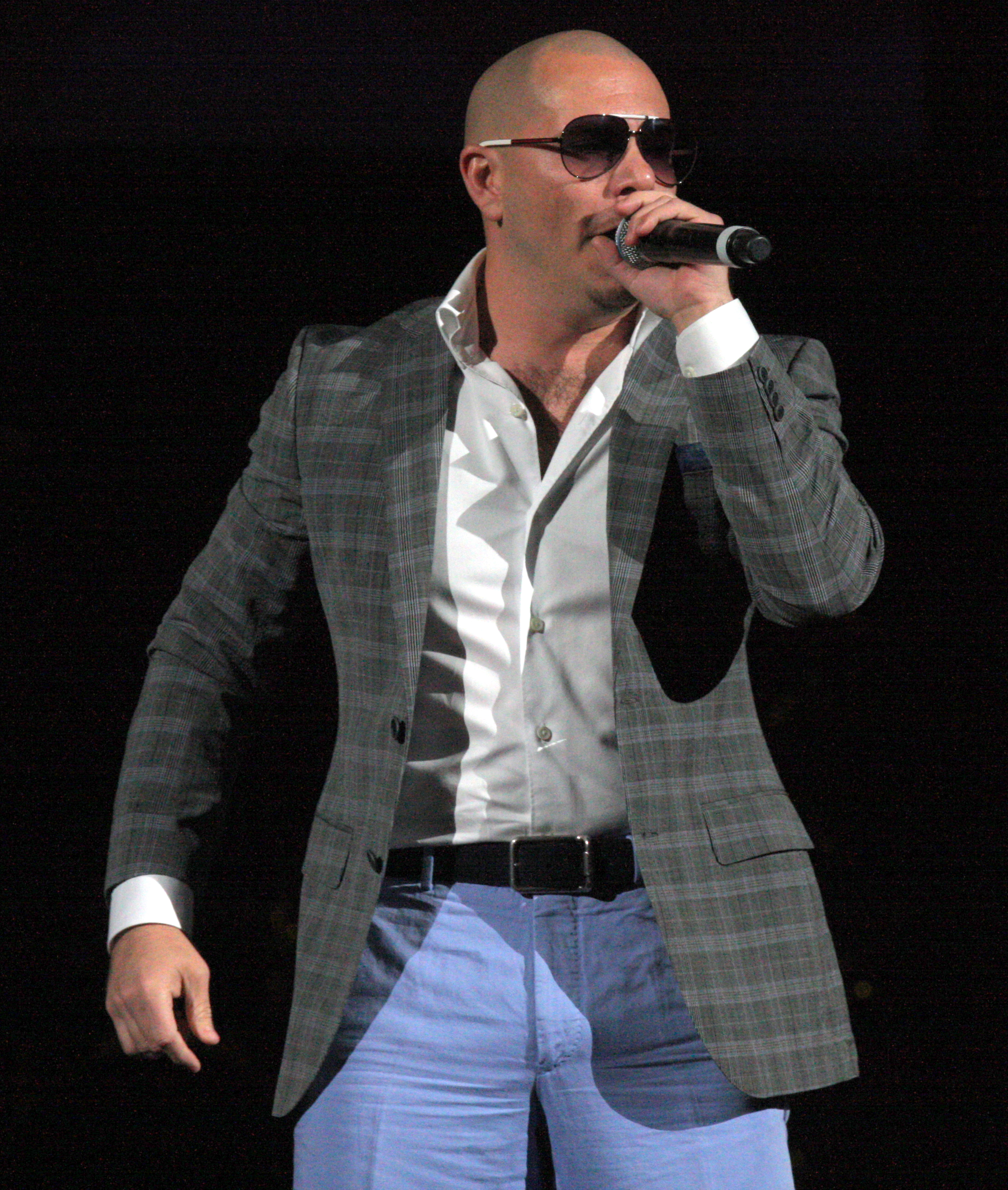
Pitbull performing in 2011

In April 2011, Jennifer Lopez released Love?, which featured Pitbull on two singles. "Fresh Out the Oven" did not meet with critical or popular success, but the second cut, "On the Floor", was a certified hit. The single went on to make its Billboard Hot 100 debut at number nine, becoming the highest debuting Hot 100 single of Lopez's career.

Pitbull released Planet Pit on June 17, 2011. Pitbull collaborated with T-Pain on its first single, which became a moderate hit; "Hey Baby (Drop It to the Floor)", which peaked at No. 7 on the Hot 100.

On March 22, 2011, Pitbull released his second single, "Give Me Everything", which features American singers Ne-Yo and Nayer as well as Dutch DJ Afrojack, who also produced the song and co-wrote it with Matt Howard, Pitbull himself and Ne-Yo.; three months later, the song became Pitbull's first single to top the Billboard Hot 100. It was ranked No. 5 on the 2011 Billboard Year-End Chart.

In August 2011, Lindsay Lohan sued Pitbull, Ne-Yo and Afrojack in response to the song's lyrics referencing her name, "I've got it locked up like Lindsay Lohan." Lohan objected to the negative connotation of the line and claimed that she should have been compensated for the use of her name in the song. The case was dismissed by a federal judge, who ruled the tune's lyrics are protected by the First Amendment, which covers freedom of speech and creative expression.

=== 2012–2013: Global Warming, Meltdown & Men in Black 3 ===
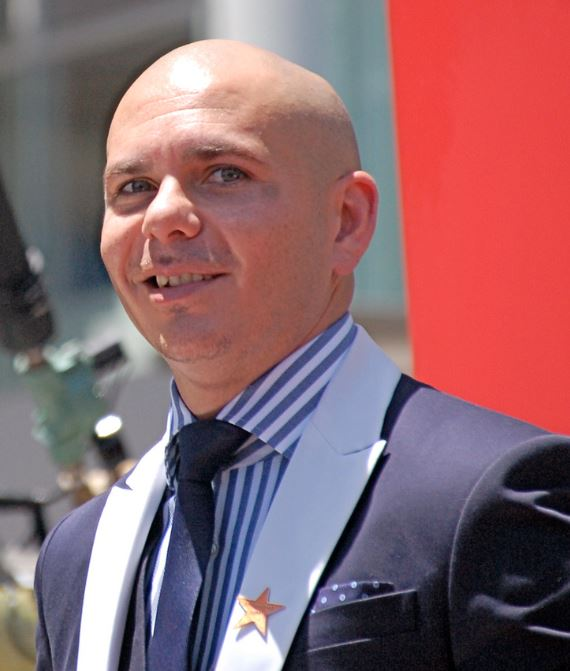
Pitbull in 2013

On October 7, 2011, RCA Music Group announced it was disbanding J Records along with Arista Records and Jive Records. With the shutdown, Pitbull (and all other artists previously signed to these three labels) would release future material on the RCA Records brand.

On May 8, 2012, he collaborated with the Italian DJ Gabry Ponte for the song "Beat on My Drum".

Pitbull's seventh studio album was titled "Global Warming" and released on November 16, 2012. Pitbull explained that the title reflected the fact that, much like the phenomenon of global warming, he has been around for a while but all of a sudden, people are paying attention. The lead single from the album was "Get It Started" featuring singer Shakira. The third single was "Feel This Moment" featuring Christina Aguilera.

The second single, entitled "Back in Time", was for the film Men in Black 3. It was the first lead single for the Men in Black franchise not performed by Will Smith. The song, which plays during the end credits but is not featured on the soundtrack album, samples "Love Is Strange" by Mickey & Sylvia. Pitbull supported the album with a world tour in the summer of 2013.

In 2013, Pitbull released a diss track towards Lil Wayne called "Welcome 2 Dade County" shortly after Lil Wayne's rant on the Miami Heat. Pitbull made his film debut in Epic with a voice role of the character "Bufo". He embarked on the North American/Australian Summer Tour with Kesha to promote both their albums, which extends from May to November.

In April 2013, Pitbull released "Open Letter (Freestyle)" in response to the controversy surrounding Jay-Z and Beyoncé's trip to Cuba, using the track to voice support for the couple while engaging with Cuban-American political identity and taking aim at Senator Marco Rubio's criticism of the visit.

He released his song "Feel This Moment" featuring Christina Aguilera on January 18, 2013, and they performed it live at the 2013 Billboard Music Awards, as well as on the fourth season of The Voice. The song was a commercial success, peaking at No. 8 on the Billboard Hot 100. Later he released the final single from his Global Warming album, Outta Nowhere featuring Danny Mercer, in late May. At the 2013 Latin Grammy Awards, Pitbull won the award for Best Urban Performance for his song "Echa Pa'lla (Manos Pa'rriba)".

Pitbull announced via Twitter that he would release the extended play to his studio album Global Warming, named Global Warming: Meltdown on November 25, featuring guest appearances from Kesha, Kelly Rowland, Inna, Mohombi and Mayer Hawthorne. The lead single, "Timber", featuring recording artist and tourmate Kesha, was released on October 7. The song peaked at No. 1 on the Billboard Hot 100 in 18 countries.

Pitbull was featured on the early summer single "Live It Up", marking his third collaboration with Jennifer Lopez and Redone. Lopez and Pitbull performed the song at the Billboard Music Awards, American Idol and Premios Juventud. He also made album appearances for Priyanka Chopra, Flo Rida, Jessica Mauboy, Belinda, Jason Derulo and other artists. Pitbull provided the post-race concert at the Formula 1 United States Grand Prix at Circuit of the Americas on November 17, 2013. Pitbull hosted the 2013 American Music Awards on November 24, 2013.

=== 2014–2015: Globalization and Dale ===
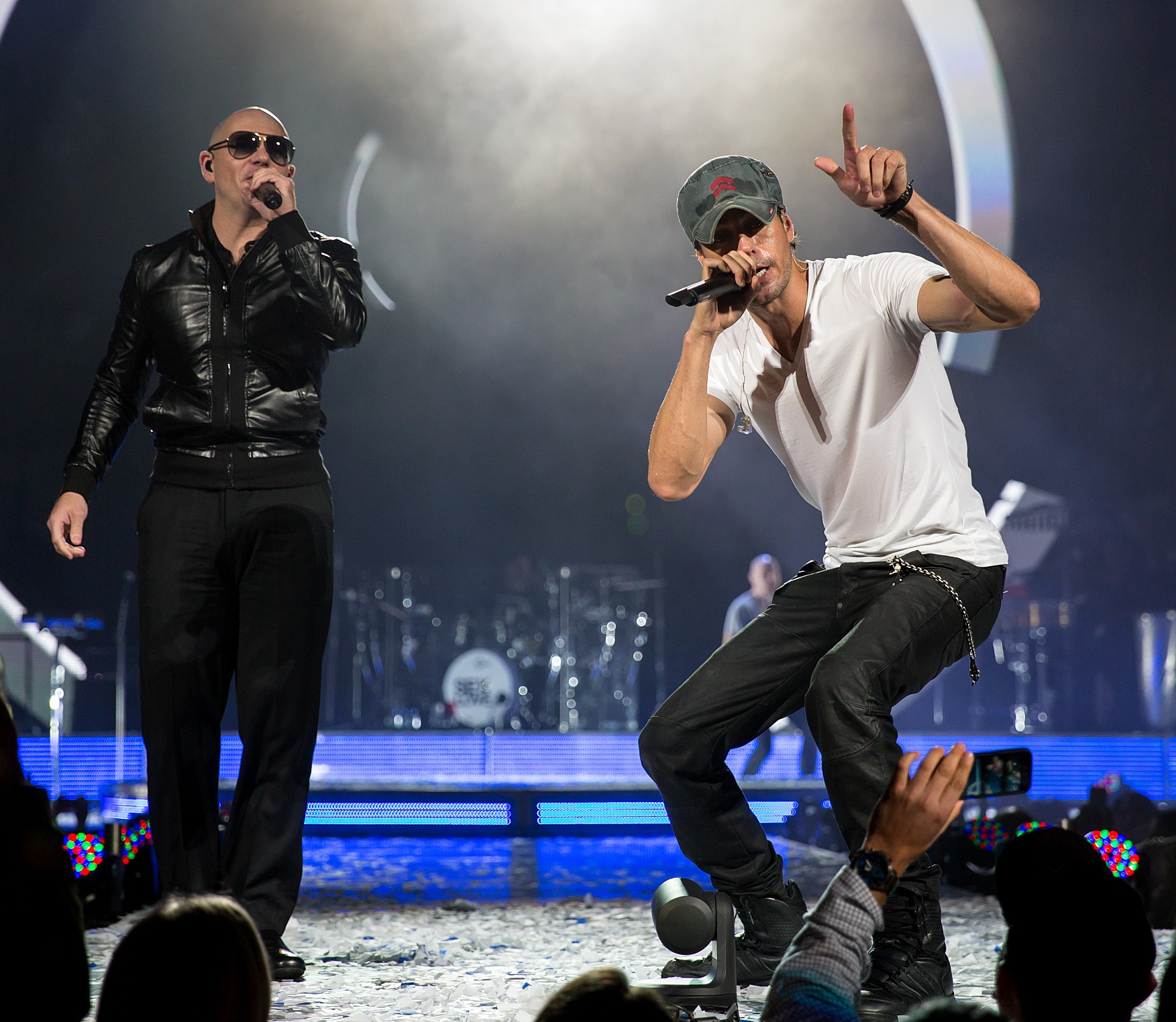
Pitbull performing with Enrique Iglesias at the Frank Erwin Center in Austin, Texas, 2015

Pitbull, Jennifer Lopez and Claudia Leitte performed the song "We Are One" at the opening ceremony of the 2014 World Cup.

On February 25, 2014, Pitbull released a new single titled "Wild Wild Love" featuring recording artist group G.R.L. It has peaked at number 30 on the Billboard Hot 100.

On April 15, 2014, Pitbull released a single featuring Jennifer Lopez and Claudia Leitte called "We Are One (Ole Ola)" from the compilation album for the FIFA 2014 World Cup One Love, One Rhythm.

In May 2014, it was announced that Pitbull would host and co-produce a live New Year's Eve concert special from Miami for Fox, Pitbull's New Year's Revolution, on December 31, 2014.

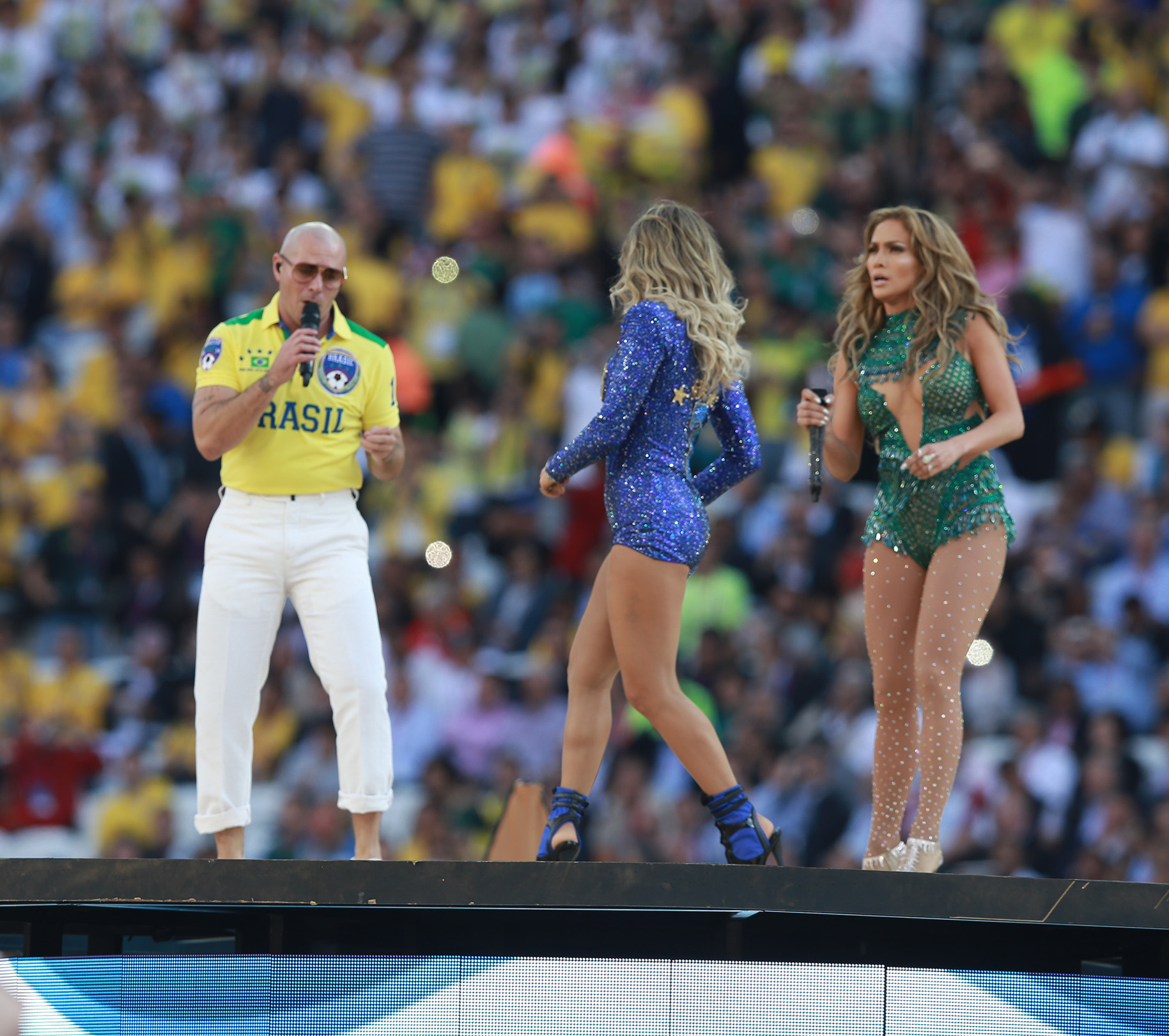
Pitbull (left) with Claudia Leitte and Jennifer Lopez performing at the 2014 FIFA World Cup opening ceremony

On June 12, 2014, Pitbull performed at the Arena de São Paulo as part of the 2014 FIFA World Cup opening ceremony. This performance saw him joined by Jennifer Lopez and Claudia Leitte to perform the tournament's official song "We Are One (Ole Ola)".

The song drew some controversy for not being a good enough representation of Brazil, which was the host country of the World Cup that year. Critics condemned the song's lyrical content for being filled with cliches about Brazilian culture, as well as for not containing enough lyrics in Portuguese. Others called it a "bad, boring, replaceable pop song."

In June 2014, it was announced that Pitbull would be receiving a star on the Hollywood Walk of Fame.

On July 8, 2014, Pitbull released a Spanish-language single titled "Como Yo Le Doy" featuring Don Miguelo. On July 23, 2014, Pitbull released another single titled "Fireball", which features singer John Ryan Produced by Honua Music. Around the same time, he announced his eighth studio album Globalization, which was released on November 21, 2014.

On October 18, 2014, Pitbull released another single titled "Celebrate" which was included on the Penguins of Madagascar soundtrack and later included on the album Globalization. Globalization was released alongside single "Time of Our Lives", which was Pitbull's first top ten hit since "Timber", peaking at #9 on the Hot 100. It also topped the Hot Dance Club Songs, Hot Rap Songs, and Rhythmic charts. On November 20, 2014, Pitbull released another Spanish-language single titled "Piensas (Dile la Verdad)" featuring Gente de Zona.

On April 21, 2015, Pitbull released his sixth single on the Globalization album titled "Fun" featuring Chris Brown and peaked at number 40 on the Hot 100. On May 8, 2015, Pitbull released a teaser video on Twitter of his upcoming second Spanish studio album and ninth studio album overall titled Dale. The album was officially released on July 17, 2015, and included the singles "Como Yo Le Doy", "Piensas (Dile la Verdad)", "El Taxi", and "Baddest Girl in Town". The album led to Pitbull winning his Grammy Award in the category of Best Latin Rock, Urban or Alternative Album.

=== 2015–2018: Climate Change, Greatest Hits, and Gotti ===
On October 26, 2015, Pitbull released a new single titled "Free.K", which samples Adina Howard's "Freak like Me" in the chorus. The song was set to be the first single off his tenth studio album titled Climate Change. On January 7, 2016, Pitbull premiered the second single from his new album titled "Freedom", which also samples The Rolling Stones song "I'm Free" in the chorus. To coincide with the release of the single, the artist also teased a 2017 Norwegian party cruise. There is a campaign that launched in January 2016 in support of the cruise that is expected to last until later in the year.

That same month, Pitbull recorded a song for the movie Ride Along 2 titled "I'm 'Bout That". The song is unavailable on music platforms for unknown reasons.

On February 14, 2017, Pitbull announced that Climate Change would be released on March 17, with pre-orders starting on February 17.

Pitbull collaborated with American girl group Fifth Harmony on "Por Favor" (released October 27, 2017) before announcing his 5th compilation album, titled Pitbull Greatest Hits. The thirteen track album features eleven of Pitbull's most successful leading artist songs, accompanied by "Jungle (with Stereotypes featuring Abraham Mateo and E-40)" and "Locas (featuring Lil Jon)", two brand new Pitbull songs. The deluxe edition of the album released exclusively in Japan featured a 14th track, "Celebrate". The compilation album was released worldwide on December 1, 2017.

Pitbull released his first full-length soundtrack album for the film Gotti alongside Jorge Gómez on June 16, 2018. Pitbull is featured on two tracks on the album, "So Sorry" and "Amore" (featuring Leona Lewis).

=== 2019–2020: YouTube history and Libertad 548 ===
Pitbull collaborated with Indian singer-songwriter Guru Randhawa on the song "Slowly Slowly", released by T-Series on April 19, 2019. The song's music video received 38 million views on YouTube within 24 hours, becoming one of the world's all-time most-viewed music videos in 24 hours.

Pitbull's eleventh studio album, Libertad 548, was released on September 27, 2019. The album included the Spanish hit single "No Lo Trates" featuring Daddy Yankee and Natti Natasha, which is RIAA Latin certified 6× Platinum (360,000+ sales). The album's second single "3 to Tango" went viral for John Travolta's surprise guest appearance in the song's official music video. The album's third single "Me Quedaré Contigo" was premiered at the 2019 Latin American Music Awards, and peaked at #1 on the Latin Airplay and Latin Rhythm Airplay Billboard charts in the United States. The album's first promotional single, "Winning" featuring Yomil y El Dany, is a part of the Boost Mobile "Dale Más" advertising campaign.

The album's fourth single "Get Ready" featuring Blake Shelton, which was premiered live by Pitbull at the Super Bowl LIV Tailgate Tropicale pre-game show, was later added to the "Dale Más" advertising campaign for a series of pre-game Super Bowl commercials for Super Bowl LIV, and a remixed version of the single serves as the official theme song for the 2020 NASCAR Cup Series. The album's second promotional single, "Cinco de Mayo" with Lil Jon featuring Chesca, was released on May 5, 2020. The promotional single was performed live at the Premio Lo Nuestro 2020. The performance gained over 2 million views on YouTube as of July 2020.

The album's fifth single, "Mueve La Cintura" featuring Tito El Bambino and Guru Randhawa, was released on June 8, 2020. An accompanying music video, which was filmed in 2019 and directed by David Rousseau, was also premiered on that same date. On July 17, 2020, the remix of "Mala", the original of which is found on Libertad 548, was released as a single. The song, titled "Mala (Remix)", features Becky G and additional guest vocals from De La Ghetto.

In 2020, amid the COVID-19 pandemic, LiveXLive launched a partnership with Pitbull, which would grant the platform exclusive rights to concerts, behind-the-scenes, videos and more from Pitbull to be streamed to LiveXLive's premium subscribers. On August 14, 2020, Pitbull released a new single, titled "Te Quiero Baby (I Love You Baby)" with Latin pop singer Chesca and American singer Frankie Valli. The single serves as a Latin interpolation of the original Frankie Valli & The Four Seasons 1967 smash hit single "Can't Take My Eyes Off You".

=== 2021–2024: Returning to touring and Trackhouse ===
On June 22, 2021, Pitbull announced across all of his official social media platforms the I Feel Good Tour, named after his single of the same name, and his first dedicated tour since 2017's Enrique Iglesias and Pitbull Live! North American tour. The 32 city tour featured special guest Iggy Azalea and began on August 20, 2021, in Clarkston, Michigan and spanned across the United States through October 13, 2021, in Tampa, Florida. On February 24, 2022, Pitbull performed with IAMCHINO and DJ Deorro on the live-debut of their late-2021 single, "Discoteca", at the 2022 Premio Lo Nuestro awards. The song samples "Around the World (La La La La La)" by Eurodance group ATC.

On April 11, 2022, Pitbull announced the Can't Stop Us Tour with Iggy Azalea and Sean Paul. This marks the second consecutive year Pitbull has toured with Iggy Azalea. Pitbull and Sean Paul have previously collaborated on their hit song, "Shake Señora", from Pitbull's sixth studio album, Planet Pit (2011). The tour began on July 28, 2022, in Raleigh, North Carolina and concluded in Hollywood, Florida on October 19, 2022.

On April 20, 2023, Pitbull performed a medley of his songs "Let's Take a Shot", "Me Pone Mal" and "Jumpin" with Vikina, Omar Courtz and Lil Jon at the 2023 Latin American Music Awards.

On October 6, 2023, Pitbull released his long-awaited twelfth studio album Trackhouse, featuring guest appearances from T-Pain, El Micha, Lil Jon, Elvis Crespo, Vikina, Omar Courtz, Nile Rodgers, Gipsy Kings and Zac Brown. It entered number one on the U.S. iTunes Latin Album Charts.

On July 20, 2024, Pitbull performed at the half-time show of the 2024 WNBA All-Star Game. On November 14, he went on stage with Jon Bon Jovi at the 25th Annual Latin Grammy Awards to perform "Now or Never", a remix of Bon Jovi's 2000 hit single "It's My Life".

=== 2025–present: Guinness World Records and a new focus on music ===
On August 29, 2025, Pitbull released his thirteenth studio album Underdogs, collaborating with IAmChino. The album was a dedication to "hardworking people who never throw in the towel". Four singles would be spawned over 5 months, with the first being released on March 5, 2025 ("Tamo Bien"), and the final one releasing on August 28, 2025 ("Borracho y Loco"). The album would fail to enter any major charts.

2026 is proving to be a busy year for Pitbull, releasing 7 singles since the start of the year, whilst also performing at his "I'm Back" tour in collaboration with Lil Jon. During the tour, on July 10, 2026, Pitbull broke the Guinness World Records for the largest gathering of people wearing bald caps at a BST concert at Hyde Park, London, where over 22,141 people wore bald caps at the concert. On August 12, 2026, Pitbull would announce his fourteenth studio album Pitcoin. The album would already have 10 singles released, including most of his 2026 singles and singles dating back to 2024. While the title is a parody of bitcoin, the album is not officially associated with any cryptocurrency, although several unofficial memecoins did appear on the market following the album's announcement.

== Product endorsements ==
In 2010, Pitbull took part in the "So Kodak" campaign for the Kodak brand with Drake, Rihanna, and Trey Songz. He also launched a partnership with the soft drink giant Dr Pepper as part of the campaign "Vida 23" for which he recorded a song that featured on his album Armando. Pitbull also announced he has become the spokesperson for Voli Vodka, in which he holds a majority equity stake, and Budweiser has chosen Pitbull to promote its Bud Light line of beer. The commercials currently highlight Pitbull dancing and gyrating on stage holding up a bottle of Bud Light. Pitbull has also purchased an equity stake in Miami Subs Pizza and Grill.

In 2012, Pitbull was involved in an advertising campaign with Walmart, in which the Walmart store that received the most Facebook "likes" from June 18 to July 15, 2012, would have Pitbull visit and put on a show there. An orchestrated campaign entitled "#exilepitbull" started by Boston Phoenix reporter David Thorpe and SomethingAwful.com writer Jon Hendren urged people to vote for the Walmart in Kodiak, Alaska, one of the most remote cities in the country. In an email to the Associated Press, Walmart confirmed that Kodiak was the winning location. Pitbull visited Kodiak on July 30, where he received a key to the city from Mayor Patricia Branson and performed. David Thorpe, who had started the "#exilepitbull" campaign, was invited to attend and showed up.

In November 2013, he started a fragrance with Jacavi Worldwide and Parlux Ltd.

On May 19, 2015, Pitbull launched a new radio channel on Sirius XM Radio, called Pitbull's Globalization Radio, which is centered around Rhythmic, Dance/EDM, and R&B/Hip-Hop product from artists from around the world. The artist celebrated the channel's debut with a private concert at New York City's Apollo Theater. In addition to launching his customized radio station, Pitbull also plans to launch a pair of projects with Endemol for digital television.

In 2019, Pitbull joined Boost Mobile to create a series of advertisements to expand Boost Mobile to Spanish communities. The promotional single "Winning" featuring Yomil y El Dany from Pitbull's 2019 album "Libertad 548" was used in the Boost Mobile "Dale Más" advertising campaign that has been actively rolling out advertisements starring Pitbull and his backup dance group The Most Bad Ones. The song "Get Ready" by Pitbull featuring Blake Shelton was later added to the advertising campaign, also from the Pitbull album Libertad 548.

On February 2, 2020, Pitbull was featured in a Super Bowl commercial for Super Bowl LIV, alongside Jennifer Lopez, DJ Khaled, Alex Rodriguez, and Steven Van Zandt. The commercial was produced to promote Hard Rock and its affiliations; the commercial premiered during the 2nd quarter of Super Bowl LIV. The commercial showcases the Seminole Hard Rock Hotel & Casino, which is also where the music video for "Get Ready" by Pitbull featuring Blake Shelton was filmed. The music video was released on February 10, 2020.

== Business activities ==
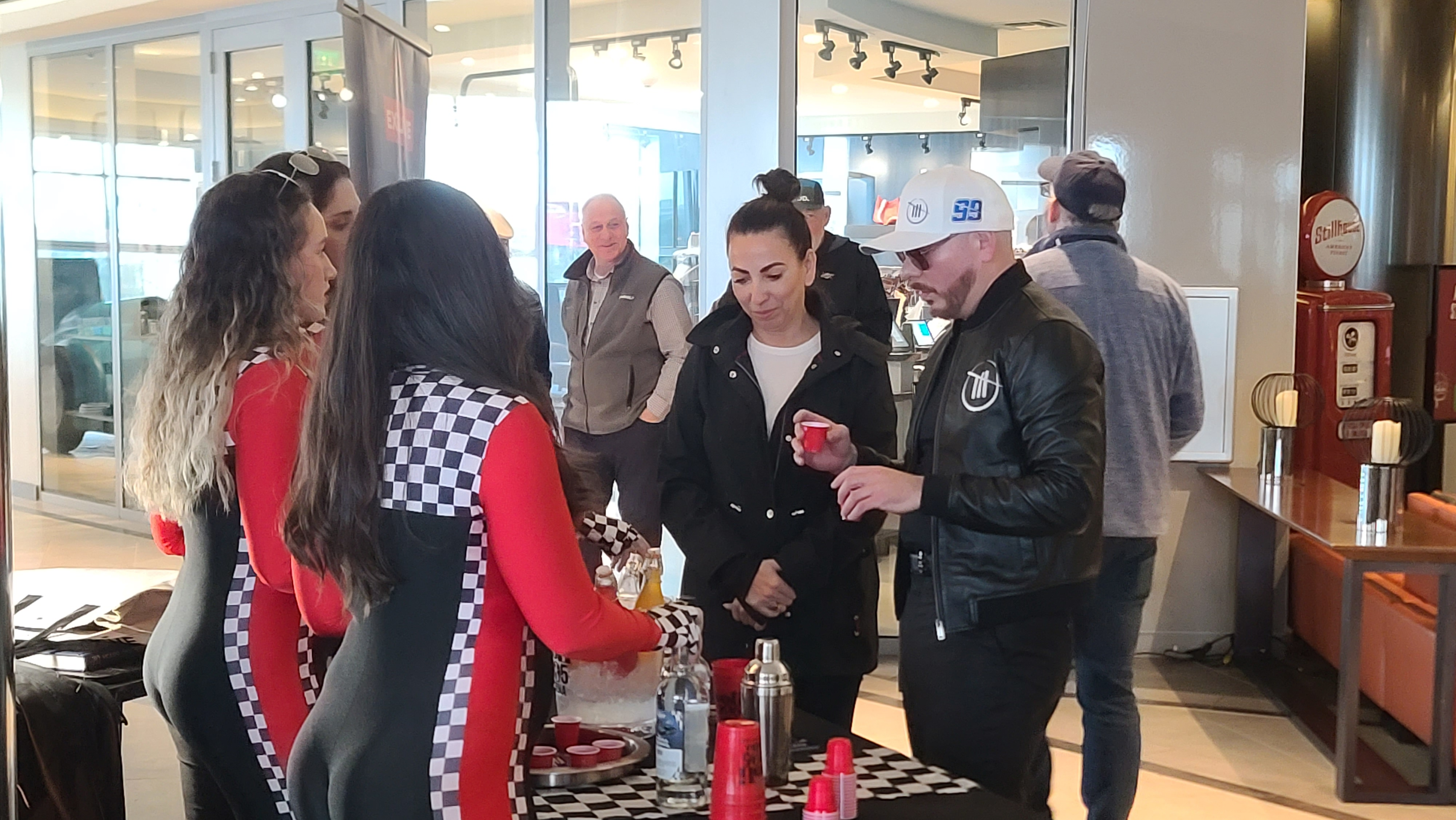
Pitbull samples Voli 305 Vodka at The Daytona hotel prior to the 2024 Daytona 500.

In 2011, Pitbull signed an equity partnership deal with Voli Vodka. In 2016, ‍he assumed ownership of the company, which rebranded as Voli 305 Vodka, with "305" being an ode to Pitbull's nickname, Mr. 305, and Miami's main area code.

On January 15, 2021, it was announced that Pitbull became a co-owner of the NASCAR Cup Series team Trackhouse Racing. On February 14, 2025, Pitbull announced he ended his partnership with Trackhouse Racing.

On August 15, 2023, it was announced that Pitbull became an investor of the restaurant chain Cilantro Taco Grill.

== Impact and activism ==
Determined to help the Latino community in his hometown, Pitbull's social impact focus for the last decade has been closing the poverty gap through educational initiatives. He helped start a Tuition-Free Public charter for middle and high school called Sports Leadership and Management (SLAM!), which opened in 2013 in Miami's Little Havana, the neighborhood where Pitbull grew up. SLAM! now operates nationwide, including in Miami, Las Vegas and Atlanta, with a 96 percent graduation rate. The school will be run by the non-profit Mater Academy.

In response to the destruction caused by Hurricane Maria, Pitbull announced he will use his private plane to bring cancer patients from Puerto Rico to the mainland United States for treatment.

On April 13, 2020, Pitbull released a single titled "I Believe That We Will Win (World Anthem)" (which samples the "I believe that we will win!" chant) during the COVID-19 pandemic. The song aims to inspire those affected by the COVID-19 outbreak to "face everything and rise". An accompanying music video was released on May 7, 2020, on YouTube, and made its television debut on MTV. Pitbull is donating all proceeds from song sales, streaming and views to Feeding America and the Anthony Robbins Foundation.

Pitbull is a vocal critic of communism and the Cuban government, having called on world leaders to support the 2021 protests against the Communist Party of Cuba.

On December 31, 2020, Pitbull performed for a crowd of first responders in Times Square during the COVID-19 pandemic for New Year's Eve.

Pitbull has also been the subject of criticism for the way women are depicted in some of his music, which has been called sexist. For example, song lyrics such as "I like that when you fight back" have generated discussion about whether or not they could be contributing to the "legitimization" of rape.

== Discography ==
- M.I.A.M.I. (2004)
- El Mariel (2006)
- The Boatlift (2007)
- Pitbull Starring in Rebelution (2009)
- Armando (2010)
- Planet Pit (2011)
- Global Warming (2012)
- Globalization (2014)
- Dale (2015)
- Climate Change (2017)
- Libertad 548 (2019)
- Trackhouse (2023)
- Underdogs (with IAmChino) (2025)
- Pitcoin (2026)

== Concert tours ==
- 2009–2011: Rebelution Tour
- 2012: Planet Pit World Tour
- 2013: North American Tour 2013 (with Kesha)
- 2015: Pitbull Live in Hong Kong
- 2016: The Bad Man Tour (with Prince Royce and Farruko)
- 2017: Enrique Iglesias and Pitbull Live! (with Enrique Iglesias)
- 2021: I Feel Good Tour (with Iggy Azalea)
- 2022: Can't Stop Us Now Tour (with Iggy Azalea and Sean Paul)
- 2023: The Trilogy Tour (with Enrique Iglesias and Ricky Martin)
- 2024: The Trilogy Tour The Party Continues (with Enrique Iglesias and Ricky Martin)
- 2024: Party After Dark Tour
- 2026: I'm Back Tour (with Lil Jon)

=== Opening act ===
- 2014–2015: Enrique Iglesias – Sex and Love Tour
- 2018: Britney Spears – Piece of Me Tour

=== Residencies ===
- 2015–2019: Pitbull: Time of Our Lives
- 2020 PPD: Pitbull: Get Ready Vegas

=== LiveXLive Virtual Concert Series ===
- 2020: Pitbull: Live & Timeless

== Filmography ==
=== Film ===
Year	Film	Role	Notes
2012	La Gasolina: Reggaeton Explosion	Himself	Documentary
2012	Blood Money	Himself	Feature film directed by Gregory McQualter
2013	Epic	Bufo	Voice
2019	UglyDolls	Ugly Dog	Voice (original English and Spanish dubs)
2021	Get Ready - Trackhouse Documentary	Team Owner	Documentary

=== Television ===
Year	Title	Role	Notes
2006	South Beach	Himself	2 episodes
2007	Punk'd	Himself	Episode: "Episode #8.7"
2007–2008	La Esquina	Himself	2 episodes; executive producer and writer
2010	When I Was 17	Himself	1 episode; with Vanessa Minnillo & Chris Paul
2012	Shark Tank	Himself	Special guest star
2012–2019	Dancing with the Stars	Himself	6 episodes; Guest Judge and Musical guest
2014–2017	Pitbull's New Year's Revolution	Himself	TV special; Host
2015	Empire	Himself	Episode: "Fires of Heaven"
2023	Superfan	Himself	1 episode; Musical guest
