= Pitbull discography =

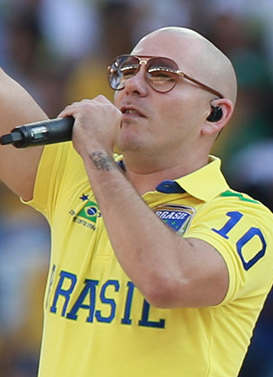
- Pitbull in 2014
- Studio albums: 13
- Extended plays: 4
- Soundtrack albums: 1
- Compilation albums: 4
- Singles: 300+
- Music videos: 200+
- Official mixtapes: 4
- Collaborative albums: 1

Cuban-American rapper Pitbull has released thirteen studio albums, four compilation albums, one collaborative album, one soundtrack album, four official mixtapes, and 9 underground mixtapes, over 300 singles (including features), over 1,000 songs (in total), and over 200 music videos.

M.I.A.M.I., Pitbull's debut album, was released on August 24, 2004, on TVT Records. It peaked at number fourteen on the US Billboard 200 albums chart. The album's lead single, "Culo", peaked at No. 32 on the US Billboard Hot 100, becoming his first entry on the chart. The album spawned an additional four singles: "That's Nasty", "Back Up", "Toma", and "Dammit Man". Money Is Still a Major Issue, a remix album of content from M.I.A.M.I., was released on November 15, 2005. El Mariel, Pitbull's second studio album, was released on October 30, 2006, and spawned four singles: "Bojangles", "Ay Chico (Lengua Afuera)", a remix of "Dime", and "Be Quiet".

The Boatlift, Pitbull's third studio album, was released on November 27, 2007. The album's second single, "The Anthem", peaked at No. 36 on the Billboard Hot 100, becoming his most successful entry on the chart at the time since "Culo". The single also garnered commercial success in several European territories. Helmed by the success of the single, The Boatlift became his first album to garner commercial success outside of the United States, peaking on the national album charts of France, Spain, and Switzerland. The album also spawned three singles: "Secret Admirer", "Go Girl", and "Sticky Icky". It also features collaborations with Twista, Jason Derulo, Lil Jon and more.

Pitbull Starring in Rebelution, Pitbull's fourth studio album, was released on September 1, 2009. It was his first album to be released by the Polo Grounds/J Records label, following his signing to the label through his own imprint, Mr. 305. The album was preceded by three singles: "Krazy", "I Know You Want Me (Calle Ocho)", and "Hotel Room Service". "I Know You Want Me (Calle Ocho)" became Pitbull's breakout into international success, peaking at number two on the Billboard Hot 100 and reaching the top ten in several European territories. "Hotel Room Service" and the subsequent single "Shut It Down" also achieved significant commercial success. The album also spawned a fifth single, "Can't Stop Me Now". Armando, Pitbull's fifth studio album, was released on November 2, 2010. It was his first primarily Spanish album and spawned four singles: "Watagatapitusberry", "Maldito Alcohol", "Bon, Bon", and "Tu Cuerpo". "Guantanamera (She's Hot)" would be reissued nearly fifteen years later on Trackhouse (Daytona 500 Edition) given a spike in popularity as a result of a TikTok trend.

Planet Pit, Pitbull's sixth studio album, was released on June 17, 2011. It has become his most commercially successful album to date, peaking at number seven on the Billboard 200 and peaking in the top ten on the national album charts of several territories. The album was preceded by two singles, the international hits "Hey Baby (Drop It to the Floor)", which peaked at No. 7 on the Billboard Hot 100, and "Give Me Everything", which peaked at number one on the Billboard Hot 100 as well as in the United Kingdom. It became his first number-one single in both countries. The album's subsequent singles, "Rain Over Me" and "International Love", also garnered significant commercial success. The Pitbull song "Back in Time" was released in 2012 as the lead single from the soundtrack to the film Men in Black 3, peaking at No. 11 on the Billboard Hot 100. His seventh studio album, Global Warming, was released on November 16, 2012, and produced the hit singles "Get It Started", "Don't Stop the Party", and "Feel This Moment". On October 7, 2013, he released a song with Kesha, named "Timber" which was followed by the Meltdown EP. Pitbull later released Global Warming: The Meltdown which combined Global Warming and the Meltdown EP.

On November 21, 2014, Pitbull released his eighth studio album that was titled Globalization. The album was preceded by the singles "Wild Wild Love", "We Are One (Ole Ola)", "Fireball" and "Time of Our Lives". The album also features the lead single from the 2014 animated film, Penguins of Madagascar, titled "Celebrate". Pitbull later released the single "Fun" with American R&B recording artist Chris Brown.

Pitbull released his ninth studio album and second Spanish album Dale in 2015. It won Pitbull his first Grammy Award. He followed this with his tenth studio album, Climate Change, on March 17, 2017. Pitbull's fourth compilation album, Greatest Hits, was released on December 1, 2017, and features two new recordings.

Pitbull released his first full-length soundtrack album for the film Gotti alongside Jorge Gómez on June 16, 2018. Pitbull's vocals are featured on two tracks on the album, "So Sorry" and "Amore" (featuring Leona Lewis), both of which were released as singles following the album's release.

Pitbull released his eleventh album Libertad 548 on September 27, 2019. The album includes the RIAA Latin 9× Platinum hit single "No Lo Trates" featuring Daddy Yankee and Natti Natasha. The album spawned RIAA Latin Platinum single "Me Quedaré Contigo" with frequent collaborator Ne-Yo, and was certified RIAA Latin Platinum on January 28, 2021.

Pitbull's twelfth studio album, Trackhouse, was released digitally on October 6, 2023. The album features collaborations with T-Pain, Lil Jon, Elvis Crespo, Vikina, Omar Courtz, Nile Rogers of Chic, Gipsy Kings, and Zac Brown of Zac Brown Band. Pitbull is an owner of the NASCAR team of the same name, Trackhouse Racing. Similar to its preceding album, the album features songs in both English and Spanish language. To promote the Daytona 500 race, a follow-up EP titled Trackhouse (Daytona 500 Edition) was released digitally on February 16, 2024. Pitbull's first EP in over ten years (2013's Meltdown), it features new collaborations with Tim McGraw and Dolly Parton and brings back Vikina and Nile Rogers for new tracks.

Pitbull has sold over 25 million studio albums and over 100 million singles worldwide. He has over 15 billion views on YouTube as of May 2020. Pitbull was ranked by Billboard as the 45th Top Artist of the 2010s and the 24th Top Latin Artist of the 2010s.

== Albums ==
=== Studio albums ===
List of studio albums, with selected chart positions, sales figures and certifications
Title	Album details	Peak chart positions										Sales	Certifications
Title	Album details	US	US Rap	AUS	AUT	CAN	GER	NZ	SPA	SWI	UK	Sales	Certifications
M.I.A.M.I.	Released: August 24, 2004 (US); Label: TVT; Format: CD, LP, digital download	14	2	—	—	—	—	—	—	—	—	US: 644,000	RIAA: Gold
El Mariel	Released: October 30, 2006 (US); Label: TVT, Bad Boy Latino; Format: CD, LP, digital download	17	2	—	—	—	—	—	—	—	—	US: 214,000	
The Boatlift	Released: November 27, 2007 (US); Label: TVT, Poe Boy, Bad Boy Latino; Format: CD, LP, digital download	50	5	—	42	—	96	—	74	23	—	US: 131,000	
Pitbull Starring in Rebelution	Released: August 28, 2009 (US); Label: J, Ultra, Bad Boy Latino, Orchard, Mr. 305, Polo Grounds; Format: CD, LP, digital download	8	1	54	20	3	34	—	90	8	142	US: 500,000	RIAA: Platinum; RMNZ: Platinum
Armando	Released: November 2, 2010 (US); Label: Mr. 305, Sony Latino; Format: CD, digital download	65	6	—	—	—	—	—	—	91	—	US: 30,000	RIAA: Gold (Latin)
Planet Pit	Released: June 21, 2011 (US); Label: J, Mr. 305, Polo Grounds; Formats: CD, digital download	7	2	5	3	4	6	10	5	2	11	US: 2,000,000	RIAA: 3× Platinum; ARIA: Platinum; BPI: Platinum; BVMI: Platinum; IFPI AUT: Gold; IFPI SWI: Gold; MC: Platinum; RMNZ: 2× Platinum
Global Warming	Released: November 16, 2012 (US); Label: RCA, Mr. 305, Polo Grounds; Formats: CD, digital download	14	1	14	12	12	21	38	38	15	111	US: 2,000,000	RIAA: 3× Platinum; ARIA: Gold; BPI: Gold; BVMI: Gold; MC: Platinum; RMNZ: 2× Platinum
Globalization	Released: November 21, 2014 (US); Label: RCA, Mr. 305, Polo Grounds; Formats: CD, digital download	18	3	60	—	15	—	—	—	34	—	US: 1,000,000	RIAA: 2× Platinum; BPI: Silver; RMNZ: 2× Platinum
Dale	Released: July 17, 2015 (US); Label: Mr. 305, Sony Latino; CD, digital download	97	9	—	—	—	—	—	62	71	—		RIAA: 3× Platinum (Latin)
Climate Change	Released: March 17, 2017 (US); Label: RCA, Mr. 305, Polo Grounds; Formats: CD, digital download	29	12	74	—	20	—	—	—	69	—		RMNZ: Gold
Libertad 548	Released: September 27, 2019 (US); Label: Mr. 305, Orchard; Format: CD, digital download	—	—	—	—	—	—	—	—	—	—	US: 60,000	RIAA: 2× Platinum (Latin)
Trackhouse	Released: October 6, 2023 (US); Label: Mr. 305; Formats: Digital download	—	—	—	—	—	—	—	—	—	—		
Pitcoin	Released: October 9, 2026 (US); Label: Mr. 305; Formats: Digital download	—	—	—	—	—	—	—	—	—	—		
"—" denotes a recording that did not chart or was not released in that territory.

==== Reissues ====
List of reissues
Title	Album details
I Am Armando	Released: July 30, 2012 (US); Label: Mr. 305, Polo Grounds; Format: CD, digital download
Global Warming: Meltdown	Released: November 25, 2013 (US); Label: Mr. 305, RCA Records; Format: CD, digital download

=== Collaborative albums ===
List of collaborative albums
Title	Album details
Underdogs (with IAmChino)	Released: August 29, 2025 (US); Label: Mr. 305; Format: CD, digital download

=== Soundtrack albums ===
List of soundtrack albums
Title	Album details
Gotti (Original Motion Picture Soundtrack) (with Jorge Gómez)	Released: June 14, 2018 (US); Label: Gotti Release LLC, Mr. 305; Formats: CD, LP, digital download

=== Compilation albums ===
List of compilation albums, with selected chart positions
Title	Album details	Peak chart positions								Certifications
Title	Album details	US	US R&B	US Rap	AUS	BEL (FL)	BEL (WA)	CAN	UK	Certifications
Money Is Still a Major Issue	Released: November 15, 2005 (US); Label: TVT, Bad Boy Latino; Formats: CD, digital download	25	4	2	—	—	—	—	—	
Original Hits	Released: May 8, 2012 (US); Label: TVT, Bad Boy Latino; Formats: CD, digital download	134	19	13	—	144	189	—	—	
International Takeover	Released: July 9, 2013 (US); Label: Ultra; Formats: CD, digital download	—	—	—	—	—	—	—	—	
Greatest Hits	Released: December 1, 2017 (US); Label: Mr. 305; Formats: CD, digital download	54	—	—	6	—	—	13	18	ARIA: Platinum; BPI: Platinum
"—" denotes a recording that did not chart or was not released in that territory.

=== Mixtapes ===
List of mixtapes
Title	Album details
Free Agent (with DJ Buddha and DJ Noodles)	Released: September 3, 2008 (US); Format: Digital download
The Streets are Talking (with DJ Got Now and DJ Billy Ho)	Released: February 14, 2009 (US); Format: Digital download
International Takeover: The United Nations (with DJ Buddha and DJ Noodles)	Released: November 5, 2009 (US); Format: Digital download
Mr. Worldwide (with DJ Buddha and DJ Noodles)	Released: April 20, 2010 (US); Format: Digital download

== EPs ==
List of extended plays, with selected chart positions
Title	Details	Peak chart positions	
Title	Details	US	US Rap
Bojangles	Released: July 11, 2006 (US); Label: TVT; Formats: Digital download	—	—
Unreleased	Released: January 4, 2010 (US); Label: Luke; Formats: Digital download	—	—
Meltdown	Released: November 25, 2013 (US); Label: RCA, Mr. 305, Polo Grounds; Formats: CD, Digital download	95	9
Trackhouse (Daytona 500 Edition)	Released: February 16, 2024 (US); Label: Mr. 305; Formats: Digital download	—	—
"—" denotes a recording that did not chart or was not released in that territory.

== Singles ==
=== As lead artist ===
List of singles as lead artist, with selected chart positions and certifications, showing year released and album name
Title	Year	Peak chart positions										Certifications	Album
Title	Year	US	US Latin	AUS	AUT	CAN	GER	NZ	SPA	SWI	UK	Certifications	Album
"Culo" (featuring Lil Jon)	2004	32	—	—	—	—	—	—	—	—	—		M.I.A.M.I.
"That's Nasty" (featuring Lil Jon and Fat Joe)	2004	—	—	—	—	—	—	—	—	—	—		M.I.A.M.I.
"Back Up"	2004	—	—	—	—	—	—	—	—	—	—		M.I.A.M.I.
"Toma" (featuring Lil Jon)	2004	— (Note: "Toma" did not enter the Billboard Hot 100, but peaked at number 8 on the Bubbling Under Hot 100 Singles chart.)	21	—	—	—	—	—	—	—	—		M.I.A.M.I.
"Dammit Man" (featuring Piccallo)	2004	— (Note: "Dammit Man" did not enter the Billboard Hot 100, but peaked at number 19 on the Bubbling Under Hot 100 Singles chart, which acts as an extension to the Hot 100.)	—	—	—	—	—	—	—	—	—		M.I.A.M.I.
"Everybody Get Up" (featuring Pretty Ricky)	2005	—	—	—	—	—	—	—	—	—	—		Money Is Still a Major Issue
"Bojangles"	2006	91	—	—	—	—	—	—	—	—	—		El Mariel
"Ay Chico (Lengua Afuera)"	2006	92	—	—	—	—	—	—	—	—	—		El Mariel
"Dime" (Remix) (featuring Frankie J and Ken-Y)	2006	— (Note: "Dime" (Remix) did not enter the Billboard Hot 100, but peaked at number 16 on the Bubbling Under Hot 100 Singles chart, which acts as an extension to the Hot 100.)	4	—	—	—	—	—	—	—	—		El Mariel
"Be Quiet"	2007	—	—	—	—	—	—	—	—	—	—		El Mariel
"Go Girl" (featuring Trina and Young Boss)	2007	83	—	—	—	—	—	—	—	—	—		The Boatlift
"The Anthem" (featuring Lil Jon)	2007	36	24	—	—	—	72	—	—	64	—		The Boatlift
"Sticky Icky" (featuring Jim Jones)	2007	—	—	—	—	—	—	—	—	—	—		The Boatlift
"Secret Admirer" (featuring Lloyd)	2007	—	—	—	—	—	—	30	—	—	—		The Boatlift
"Krazy" (featuring Lil Jon)	2008	30	—	—	—	70	—	—	—	59	—	RIAA: Gold	Pitbull Starring in Rebelution
"I Know You Want Me (Calle Ocho)"	2009	2	6	6	3	2	8	3	1	2	4	RIAA: 2× Platinum; ARIA: Platinum; BPI: Platinum; BVMI: Gold; IFPI SWI: Gold; MC: 4× Platinum; PROMUSICAE: 3× Platinum; RMNZ: 2× Platinum	Pitbull Starring in Rebelution
"Hotel Room Service"	2009	8	26	11	22	7	22	29	15	11	9	RIAA: 5× Platinum; ARIA: Platinum; BPI: Platinum; BVMI: Platinum; MC: 2× Platinum; RMNZ: 2× Platinum	Pitbull Starring in Rebelution
"Shut It Down" (featuring Akon)	2009	42	44	18	35	23	30	25	—	41	33	RIAA: Gold; MC: Platinum	Pitbull Starring in Rebelution
"Watagatapitusberry" (featuring Sensato, El Cata, Black Point and Lil Jon)	2010	—	—	—	—	—	—	—	—	—	—		Armando
"Maldito Alcohol" (vs. Afrojack)	2010	—	—	—	—	—	—	—	—	—	—		Armando
"Bon, Bon"	2010	61	3	—	36	—	39	—	38	47	—	RIAA: Gold	Armando
"Hey Baby (Drop It to the Floor)" (featuring T-Pain)	2010	7	26	10	22	10	24	23	—	21	38	RIAA: 5× Platinum; ARIA: 2× Platinum; BPI: Gold; BVMI: Gold; IFPI AUT: Gold; IFPI SWI: Gold; MC: 3× Platinum; RMNZ: Platinum	Planet Pit
"Tu Cuerpo" (featuring Jencarlos)	2011	—	—	—	—	—	—	—	—	—	—		Armando
"Give Me Everything" (featuring Ne-Yo, Afrojack and Nayer)	2011	1	1	2	1	1	1	1	2	1	1	RIAA: 11× Platinum (Diamond); ARIA: 6× Platinum; BPI: 4× Platinum; BVMI: 2× Platinum; IFPI AUT: Platinum; IFPI SWI: 2× Platinum; MC: 7× Platinum; PROMUSICAE: 2× Platinum; RMNZ: 6× Platinum	Planet Pit
"Rain Over Me" (featuring Marc Anthony)	2011	30	1	9	5	7	7	7	1	3	28	RIAA: 2× Platinum; ARIA: Platinum; BPI: Silver; BVMI: Gold; IFPI AUT: Gold; IFPI SWI: 2× Platinum; MC: 2× Platinum; PROMUSICAE: Platinum; RMNZ: Platinum	Planet Pit
"International Love" (featuring Chris Brown)	2011	13	9	15	8	10	21	7	3	13	10	RIAA: 5× Platinum; ARIA: 3× Platinum; BPI: Platinum; BVMI: Gold; IFPI AUT: Gold; IFPI SWI: Platinum; MC: 3× Platinum; PROMUSICAE: Platinum; RMNZ: 2× Platinum	Planet Pit
"I Like (The Remix)" (featuring Enrique Iglesias and Afrojack)	2012	—	—	—	—	—	—	—	—	—	—		Non-album single
"Back in Time"	2012	11	26	4	1	4	5	10	35	6	21	RIAA: 2× Platinum; ARIA: 3× Platinum; BVMI: Platinum; IFPI AUT: Platinum; IFPI SWI: Platinum; MC: 4× Platinum	Global Warming
"Get It Started" (featuring Shakira)	2012	89	48	31	17	42	31	—	14	32	64	MC: Gold	Global Warming
"Don't Stop the Party" (featuring TJR)	2012	17	—	15	10	8	23	23	16	59	7	RIAA: 3× Platinum; ARIA: 2× Platinum; BPI: Platinum; MC: 3× Platinum; RMNZ: Platinum	Global Warming
"Feel This Moment" (featuring Christina Aguilera)	2013	8	—	6	2	4	9	5	1	7	5	RIAA: 6× Platinum; ARIA: 3× Platinum; BPI: Platinum; BVMI: Platinum; IFPI AUT: Platinum; IFPI SWI: Platinum; MC: 4× Platinum; PROMUSICAE: Platinum; RMNZ: 2× Platinum	Global Warming
"Outta Nowhere" (featuring Danny Mercer)	2013	—	—	—	19	—	67	—	—	—	—		Global Warming
"Timber" (featuring Kesha)	2013	1	—	4	1	1	1	3	5	3	1	RIAA: 12× Platinum (Diamond); ARIA: 5× Platinum; BPI: 4× Platinum; BVMI: Diamond; IFPI AUT: Platinum; IFPI SWI: Platinum; MC: 7× Platinum; PROMUSICAE: 3× Platinum; RMNZ: 6× Platinum	Meltdown
"Wild Wild Love" (featuring G.R.L.)	2014	30	—	10	—	22	—	25	—	—	6	RIAA: Platinum; ARIA: Platinum; BPI: Silver; MC: Platinum; RMNZ: Gold	Globalization
"We Are One (Ole Ola)" (featuring Jennifer Lopez and Claudia Leitte)	2014	59	—	—	6	51	6	20	4	2	29	RIAA: Platinum; BPI: Silver; BVMI: Gold; IFPI SWI: Gold; PROMUSICAE: Gold*	Globalization
"Fireball" (featuring John Ryan)	2014	23	—	26	12	16	22	—	6	51	49	RIAA: 5× Platinum; ARIA: Gold; BPI: Platinum; BVMI: Gold; MC: Platinum; PROMUSICAE: Platinum; RMNZ: 2× Platinum	Globalization
"Como Yo Le Doy" (featuring Don Miguelo)	2014	— (Note: "Como Yo Le Doy" did not enter the Billboard Hot 100, but peaked at number 1 on the Billboard Bubbling Under Hot 100 Singles chart.)	14	—	40	—	—	—	3	—	—	PROMUSICAE: 3× Platinum	Dale
"El Taxi" (featuring Osmani García and Sensato)	2014	—	13	—	—	39	—	99	2	—	—	RIAA: Gold; RIAA: Platinum (Latin); PROMUSICAE: 2× Platinum	Dale
"Celebrate"	2014	— (Note: "Celebrate" did not enter the Billboard Hot 100, but peaked at number 1 on the Billboard Bubbling Under Hot 100 Singles chart.)	—	—	—	—	—	35	—	—	—		Globalization
"Time of Our Lives" (with Ne-Yo)	2014	9	—	12	26	10	22	12	25	35	27	RIAA: 8× Platinum; ARIA: Platinum; BPI: 2× Platinum; BVMI: Platinum; PROMUSICAE: Platinum; RMNZ: 7× Platinum	Globalization
"Piensas (Dile la Verdad)" (featuring Gente de Zona)	2014	—	11	—	—	—	—	—	21	—	—	PROMUSICAE: Platinum	Dale
"Fun" (featuring Chris Brown)	2015	40	—	—	44	29	36	—	78	50	68	RIAA: Platinum; RMNZ: Gold	Globalization
"Baddest Girl in Town" (featuring Mohombi and Wisin)	2015	—	12	—	—	—	—	—	36	—	—		Dale
"Drive You Crazy" (featuring Jason Derulo and Juicy J)	2015	—	—	—	—	—	—	—	—	—	—		Globalization
"Messin' Around" (featuring Enrique Iglesias)	2016	64	—	—	—	80	—	—	49	—	—	RIAA: Platinum	Climate Change
"Greenlight" (featuring Flo Rida and LunchMoney Lewis)	2016	95	—	—	—	77	90	—	—	—	—	RIAA: Platinum; BPI: Silver; MC: Gold	Climate Change
"Options" (featuring Stephen Marley)	2017	—	—	—	—	—	—	3	—	—	—	RMNZ: 3× Platinum	Climate Change
"Hey Ma" (with J Balvin featuring Camila Cabello)	2017	— (Note: "Hey Ma" did not enter the Billboard Hot 100, but peaked at number 8 on the Billboard Bubbling Under Hot 100 Singles chart.)	5	—	95	64	—	52	6	—	—	RIAA: Gold; PROMUSICAE: 3× Platinum	The Fate of the Furious: The Album
"Better On Me" (featuring Ty Dolla Sign)	2017	—	—	—	—	—	—	—	—	—	—		Climate Change
"Por Favor" (with Fifth Harmony)	2017	—	15	—	—	—	—	—	19	—	—		Fifth Harmony
"Jungle" (with Stereotypes featuring E-40 and Abraham Mateo)	2017	—	—	—	—	—	—	—	—	—	—		Greatest Hits
"Amore" (featuring Leona Lewis)	2018	—	—	—	—	—	—	—	—	—	—		Gotti
"So Sorry"	2018	—	—	—	—	—	—	—	—	—	—		Gotti
"Dame Tu Cosita" (with El Chombo and Karol G featuring Cutty Ranks)	2018	—	1	—	—	—	—	—	—	—	—	RIAA: 7× Platinum (Latin)	Non-album singles
"Quiero Saber" (featuring Prince Royce and Ludacris)	2018	—	—	—	—	—	—	—	—	—	—		Non-album singles
"Ocean to Ocean" (featuring Rhea)	2018	—	—	—	—	—	—	—	—	—	—		Aquaman
"No Lo Trates" (with Natti Natasha and Daddy Yankee)	2019	—	15	—	—	—	—	—	60	74	—	RIAA: 11× Platinum (Latin); PROMUSICAE: Gold	Libertad 548
"3 to Tango"	2019	—	—	—	—	—	—	—	—	—	—		Libertad 548
"Me Quedaré Contigo" (with Ne-Yo featuring Lenier and El Micha)	2019	—	15	—	—	—	—	—	—	74	—	RIAA: 2× Platinum (Latin)	Libertad 548
"Get Ready" (featuring Blake Shelton)	2020	—	—	—	—	—	—	—	—	—	—		Libertad 548
"I Believe That We Will Win (World Anthem)"	2020	—	—	—	—	—	—	—	—	—	—		Non-album single
"Mueve La Cintura" (featuring Tito El Bambino and Guru Randhawa)	2020	—	—	—	—	—	—	—	—	—	—		Libertad 548
"Mala (Remix)" (featuring Becky G and De La Ghetto)	2020	—	—	—	—	—	—	—	—	—	—		Non-album singles
"Moviéndolo (Remix)" (with Wisin & Yandel and El Alfa)	2020	—	—	—	—	—	—	—	—	—	—		Non-album singles
"Que Rica (Tocame)" (with Sak Noel and Salvi)	2020	—	—	—	—	—	—	—	—	—	—		Non-album singles
"Se La Vi" (with IAmChino and Papayo)	2020	—	—	—	—	—	—	—	—	—	—		Libertad 548
"Winning" (featuring Yomil y El Dany)	2020	—	—	—	—	—	—	—	—	—	—		Libertad 548
"Tell Me Again" (featuring Prince Royce and Ludacris)	2020	—	—	—	—	—	—	—	—	—	—		Libertad 548
"Cantare" (featuring Lenier)	2021	—	—	—	—	—	—	—	—	—	—		Libertad 548
"Ten Cuidado" (with Farruko and IAmChino featuring El Alfa and Omar Courtz)	2021	—	50	—	—	—	—	—	—	—	—	RIAA: Platinum (Latin)	Non-album singles
"I Feel Good" (featuring Anthony Watts and DJWS)	2021	—	—	—	—	87	—	—	—	—	—		Non-album singles
"Can't Stop Us Now" (with Zac Brown)	2022	—	—	—	—	—	—	—	—	—	—		Trackhouse
"Café Con Leche"	2022	—	—	—	—	—	—	—	—	—	—		Trackhouse
"Party of a Lifetime" (with Play-N-Skillz)	2022	—	—	—	—	—	—	—	—	—	—		Non-album singles
"Mamasota"	2022	—	—	—	—	—	—	—	—	—	—		Non-album singles
"Right or Wrong (Hypnosis)" (with AYYBO and ero808)	2023	—	—	—	—	—	—	—	—	—	—		Non-album singles
"Mami"	2023	—	—	—	—	—	—	—	—	—	—		Trackhouse
"Me Pone Mal" (featuring Omar Courtz)	2023	—	—	—	—	—	—	—	—	—	—		Trackhouse
"Jumpin" (with Lil Jon)	2023	—	—	—	—	—	—	—	—	—	—		Trackhouse
"Freak 54 (Freak Out)" (with Nile Rodgers)	2023	—	—	—	—	—	—	—	—	—	—		Trackhouse
"2 the Moon" (featuring Ne-Yo and Afrojack)	2024	—	—	—	—	—	—	—	—	—	—		Non-album single
"Now or Never" (with Bon Jovi)	2024	—	—	—	—	—	—	—	—	—	—		Pitcoin
"Bhool Bhulaiyaa 3 Title Track" (with Diljit Dosanjh and Neeraj Shridhar)	2024	—	—	—	—	—	—	—	—	—	—		Bhool Bhulaiyaa 3
"Tamo Bien" (with Enrique Iglesias and IAmChino)	2025	—	—	—	—	—	—	—	—	—	—		Underdogs and Pitcoin
"No Te Hagas" (with Sensato)	2025	—	—	—	—	—	—	—	—	—	—		Non-album single
"Soy Así" (with IAmChino and Victor Cardenas)	2025	—	—	—	—	—	—	—	—	—	—		Underdogs
"Damn I Love Miami" (with Lil Jon)	2025	76	—	—	—	86	—	—	—	—	—		Bad Boys for Life and Pitcoin
"Pretty Woman (All Around the World)" (with Azteck and Gabry Ponte)	2025	—	—	—	—	—	—	—	—	—	—		Non-album single
"Yeehaw" (with Filmore)	2025	—	—	—	—	—	—	—	—	—	—		Atypical and Pitcoin
"Soy Así 2" (with IAmChino and Wiz Khalifa featuring Victor Cardenas)	2026	—	—	—	—	—	—	—	—	—	—		Pitcoin
"Pa' Los Envidiosos" (with Lenier)	2026	—	—	—	—	—	—	—	—	—	—		Pitcoin
"Work"	2026	—	—	—	—	—	—	—	—	—	—		Pitcoin
"Satalanaaa" (with Lil Jon)	2026	—	—	—	—	—	—	—	—	—	—		Pitcoin
"Privacy" (with Jason Derulo)	2026	—	—	—	—	—	—	—	—	—	—		Pitcoin
"—" denotes a recording that did not chart or was not released in that territory.

=== As featured artist ===
List of singles as featured artist, with selected chart positions and certifications, showing year released and album name
Title	Year	Peak chart positions										Certifications	Album
Title	Year	US	AUS	AUT	CAN	FRA	GER	NZ	SPA	SWI	UK	Certifications	Album
"Shake" (Ying Yang Twins featuring Pitbull)	2005	41	—	—	—	—	—	—	—	—	49		U.S.A. (United State of Atlanta)
"Hit the Floor" (Twista featuring Pitbull)	2005	94	—	—	—	—	—	—	—	—	—		The Day After
"Kamasutra" (Adassa featuring Pitbull)	2005	—	—	—	—	—	—	—	—	—	—		Kamasutra
"Get Freaky" (Play-N-Skillz featuring Pitbull)	2006	—	—	—	—	—	—	—	—	—	—		Non-album single
"Holla at Me" (DJ Khaled featuring Lil Wayne, Paul Wall, Fat Joe, Rick Ross and Pitbull)	2006	59	—	—	—	—	—	—	—	—	—		Listennn... the Album
"Born-N-Raised" (DJ Khaled featuring Trick Daddy, Rick Ross and Pitbull)	2006	—	—	—	—	—	—	—	—	—	—		Listennn... the Album
"Crazy" (Lumidee featuring Pitbull)	2007	—	—	65	—	53	35	—	—	—	74		Unexpected
"Mi Alma Se Muere" (Fuego featuring Omega and Pitbull)	2008	—	—	—	—	—	—	—	—	—	—		Chosen Few III soundtrack
"Move Shake Drop" (DJ Laz featuring Flo Rida, Casely and Pitbull)	2008	56	—	—	—	—	—	—	—	—	—		Category 6
"Swing" (Remix) (Savage featuring Pitbull)	2008	—	—	—	—	—	—	—	—	—	—		Savage Island
"Feel It" (DJ Felli Fel featuring T-Pain, Sean Paul, Flo Rida and Pitbull)	2009	—	—	—	—	—	—	—	—	—	—		Non-album single
"Shooting Star" (Party Rock Remix) (David Rush featuring Pitbull, Kevin Rudolf and LMFAO)	2009	—	—	—	66	—	—	—	—	—	—		Feel the Rush Vol. 1
"Take Me on the Floor" (Remix) (The Veronicas featuring Pitbull)	2009	—	—	—	—	—	—	—	—	—	—		Non-album single
"Now I'm That Bitch" (Livvi Franc featuring Pitbull)	2009	— (Note: "Now I'm That Bitch" did not enter the Billboard Hot 100, but peaked at number 14 on the Bubbling Under Hot 100 Singles chart.)	—	—	—	—	—	—	—	—	40		Underground Sunshine
"Outta Control" (Baby Bash featuring Pitbull)	2009	— (Note: "Outta Control" did not enter the Billboard Hot 100, but peaked at number 12 on the Bubbling Under Hot 100 Singles chart.)	—	—	—	—	—	—	—	—	—		Non-album singles
"Patron Tequila" (Vanguards Remix) (Paradiso Girls featuring Pitbull and Lil Jon)	2009	—	—	—	—	—	—	—	—	—	—		Non-album singles
"Future Love" (Kristina DeBarge featuring Pitbull)	2009	— (Note: "Future Love" did not enter the Billboard Hot 100, but peaked at number 25 on the Bubbling Under Hot 100 Singles chart.)	—	—	—	—	—	—	—	—	—		Exposed
"Now You See It (Shake That Ass)" (Honorebel featuring Pitbull and Jump Smokers)	2009	—	—	—	—	—	—	—	—	—	—		Club Scene
"Ni Rosas Ni Juguetes" (Mr. 305 Remix) (Paulina Rubio featuring Pitbull)	2009	—	—	—	—	—	—	—	—	—	—		Non-album single
"Egoísta" (Belinda featuring Pitbull)	2010	—	—	—	—	—	—	—	—	—	—		Carpe Diem
"Armada Latina" (Cypress Hill featuring Marc Anthony and Pitbull)	2010	— (Note: "Armanda Latina" did not enter the Billboard Hot 100, but peaked at number 6 on the Bubbling Under Hot 100 Singles chart.)	—	—	96	—	—	—	—	—	—		Rise Up
"All Night Long" (Alexandra Burke featuring Pitbull)	2010	—	—	—	—	—	60	—	—	—	4	BPI: Silver	Overcome
"I Like It" (Enrique Iglesias featuring Pitbull)	2010	4	2	6	1	2	10	7	4	6	4	RIAA: 4× Platinum; ARIA: 4× Platinum; BPI: Platinum; BVMI: Gold; IFPI SWI: Gold; MC: 3× Platinum; PROMUSICAE: Platinum; RMNZ: Platinum	Euphoria
"I Wanna" (Honorebel featuring Pitbull)	2010	—	—	—	—	—	—	—	—	—	—		Club Scene
"Get to Know Me Better" (Naughty by Nature featuring Pitbull)	2010	—	—	—	—	—	—	—	—	—	—		Anthem Inc.
"Oye Baby" (Nicola Fasano featuring Pitbull)	2010	—	—	—	—	—	—	—	—	—	—		Planet Pit
"DJ Got Us Fallin' in Love" (Usher featuring Pitbull)	2010	4	3	5	2	3	5	4	11	4	7	RIAA: 8× Platinum; ARIA: 6× Platinum; BPI: 2× Platinum; BVMI: 2× Platinum; IFPI AUT: Gold; IFPI SWI: Platinum; MC: 2× Platinum; RMNZ: 4× Platinum	Versus
"One Thing Leads to Another" (Ray J featuring Pitbull)	2010	—	—	—	—	—	—	—	—	—	—		Raydiation 2
"On the Floor" (Jennifer Lopez featuring Pitbull)	2011	3	1	1	1	1	1	2	1	1	1	RIAA: 8× Platinum; ARIA: 4× Platinum; BPI: 3× Platinum; BVMI: 7× Gold; IFPI SWI: 4× Platinum; MC: 5× Platinum; PROMUSICAE: 3× Platinum; RMNZ: 4× Platinum	Love?
"Rabiosa" (Shakira featuring Pitbull)	2011	— (Note: "Rabiosa" did not enter the Billboard Hot 100, but peaked at number 10 on the Bubbling Under Hot 100 Singles chart.)	—	6	38	6	26	—	1	3	—	IFPI SWI: Gold; PROMUSICAE: Platinum	Sale el Sol
"Boomerang" (DJ Felli Fel featuring Akon, Pitbull and Jermaine Dupri)	2011	—	—	—	—	—	—	—	—	—	—		Non-album singles
"Bumpy Ride" (Remix) (Mohombi featuring Pitbull and Machel Montano)	2011	—	—	—	—	—	—	—	—	—	—		Non-album singles
"Fired Up (Fuck the Recession)" (Shaggy featuring Pitbull)	2011	—	—	—	—	—	—	—	—	—	—		Summer in Kingston
"Suave (Kiss Me)" (Nayer featuring Mohombi and Pitbull)	2011	—	—	—	34	49	—	—	—	—	—		Non-album singles
"Throw Your Hands Up (Dançar Kuduro)" (Qwote featuring Pitbull and Lucenzo)	2011	—	—	—	—	—	—	29	—	—	—	ARIA: 3× Platinum	Non-album singles
"Pass at Me" (Timbaland featuring Pitbull)	2011	— (Note: "Pass at Me" did not enter the Billboard Hot 100, but peaked at number 4 on the Bubbling Under Hot 100 Singles chart.)	—	—	—	100	27	—	—	—	40		Non-album singles
"I Like How It Feels" (Enrique Iglesias featuring Pitbull and The WAV.s)	2011	74	—	—	11	—	—	19	14	—	135	ARIA: Gold; MC: Platinum; RMNZ: Gold	Sex and Love
"Bailando Por El Mundo" (Juan Magan featuring Pitbull and El Cata)	2011	— (Note: "Bailando Por El Mundo" did not enter the Billboard Hot 100, but peaked at number 9 on the Bubbling Under Hot 100 Singles chart.)	—	—	—	—	—	—	22	15	—		The King of Dance
"U Know It Ain't Love" (R.J. featuring Pitbull)	2011	—	—	52	—	185	49	—	—	43	—		Non-album single
"Crazy People" (Sensato featuring Pitbull and Sak Noel)	2011	—	—	—	—	—	—	—	—	—	164		Crazy Society Trilogy
"Rock the Boat" (Bob Sinclar featuring Pitbull, Dragonfly and Fatman Scoop)	2011	—	—	51	99	22	45	—	21	20	—		Disco Crash
"Raise the Roof" (Hampenberg and Alexander Brown featuring Pitbull, Fatman Scoop and Nabiha)	2012	—	—	—	—	—	—	—	—	—	—		Non-album single
"Name of Love" (Jean-Roch featuring Pitbull and Nayer)	2012	—	—	—	—	49	—	—	—	—	—		Music Saved My Life
"Richest Man" (Play-N-Skillz featuring Pitbull)	2012	—	—	—	—	—	—	—	—	—	—		Alter Egos
"Bedroom" (Redd featuring Pitbull and Qwote)	2012	—	—	39	—	—	40	—	—	41	—		Non-album single
"Dance Again" (Jennifer Lopez featuring Pitbull)	2012	17	—	8	4	15	14	12	4	14	11	RIAA: Platinum; BPI: Silver; BVMI: Platinum; ARIA: Platinum; MC: Platinum; PROMUSICAE: Gold	Dance Again... the Hits
"There She Goes" (Taio Cruz featuring Pitbull)	2012	—	—	8	65	65	5	—	—	2	12	BVMI: 3× Gold; IFPI SWI: Gold	TY.O
"Beat on My Drum" (Gabry Ponte and Sophia Del Carmen featuring Pitbull)	2012	—	—	—	—	—	—	—	—	—	—		Non-album single
"I'm All Yours" (Jay Sean featuring Pitbull)	2012	85	13	57	53	107	40	22	—	—	—	ARIA: 2× Platinum	Neon
"Letting Go (Cry Just a Little)" (Qwote featuring Mr. Worldwide)	2012	—	—	—	—	—	—	—	—	—	—		Ultra Dance 14
"Ai Se Eu Te Pego (If I Get Ya)" (Mr. Worldwide Remix) (Michel Teló featuring Pitbull)	2012	—	—	—	—	—	—	—	—	—	—		Non-album single
"Sin Ti (I Don't Want to Miss a Thing)" (Dyland & Lenny featuring Pitbull and Beatriz Luengo)	2012	—	—	—	—	—	—	—	—	—	—		My World 2
"Bad" (Afrojack Remix) (Michael Jackson featuring Pitbull)	2012	—	—	45	—	—	—	—	—	—	—		Bad 25
"Hiya Hiya" (Khaled featuring Pitbull)	2012	—	—	—	—	—	—	—	—	—	—		C'est la vie
"Sexy People (The Fiat Song)" (Arianna featuring Pitbull)	2013	97	—	—	—	—	—	—	—	—	—		Non-album singles
"Spring Love 2013" (Stevie B featuring Pitbull)	2013	—	—	—	—	—	87	—	—	—	—		Non-album singles
"Live It Up" (Jennifer Lopez featuring Pitbull)	2013	60	—	23	16	67	36	27	10	33	17	ARIA: Gold; MC: Gold	Non-album singles
"Chasing Shadows" (Jamie Drastik featuring Pitbull and Havana Brown)	2013	—	—	—	—	—	—	—	—	—	—		Non-album singles
"Habibi I Love You" (Ahmed Chawki featuring Pitbull)	2013	—	—	—	—	153	—	—	—	—	—		Non-album singles
"Exotic" (Priyanka Chopra featuring Pitbull)	2013	—	—	—	74	—	—	—	—	—	—		Non-album singles
"Can't Believe It" (Flo Rida featuring Pitbull)	2013	— (Note: "Can't Believe It" did not enter the Billboard Hot 100, but peaked at number 2 on the Bubbling Under Hot 100 Singles chart.)	8	16	—	—	4	36	—	19	—	ARIA: Gold	Non-album singles
"Sopa de Caracol - Yupi" (Note: "Sopa de Caracol - Yupi" did not enter the Billboard Hot 100, but peaked at number 96 on the Billboard Hot Latin Songs.) (Elvis Crespo featuring Pitbull)	2013	—	—	—	—	—	—	—	—	—	—		One Flag
"Seize the Night" (Honorebel featuring Pitbull)	2013	—	—	—	—	—	—	—	—	—	—		Non-album singles
"FCK" (Gary Caos featuring Pitbull and Snow Tha Product)	2013	—	—	—	—	—	—	—	—	—	—		Non-album singles
"Get on the Floor (Vamos Dançar)" (Carolina Márquez featuring Pitbull and Dale Saunders)	2013	—	—	—	—	—	—	—	—	—	—		Non-album singles
"I'm a Freak" (Enrique Iglesias featuring Pitbull)	2014	—	—	39	52	—	56	—	17	—	4	BPI: Silver	Sex and Love
"I Love You... Te Quiero" (Belinda featuring Pitbull)	2014	—	—	—	—	—	—	—	—	—	—		Catarsis
"Mmm Yeah" (Austin Mahone featuring Pitbull)	2014	49	—	57	51	—	72	—	35	62	34	RIAA: Platinum; ARIA: Gold	The Secret
"Can't Get Enough" (Becky G featuring Pitbull)	2014	— (Note: "Can't Get Enough" did not chart on the Billboard Hot 100, though did peak at number 1 on the Latin Rhythm Airplay chart.)	—	—	—	—	—	—	—	—	—		Play It Again
"Drink to That All Night" (Remix) (Jerrod Niemann featuring Pitbull)	2014	—	—	—	—	—	—	—	—	—	—		High Noon
"Good Time" (Inna featuring Pitbull)	2014	—	—	—	—	—	—	—	—	—	—		Party Never Ends and Body and the Sun
"Yo Quiero (Si Tú Te Enamores)" (Gente de Zona featuring Pitbull)	2014	—	—	—	—	—	—	—	—	—	—		Visualízate, Dale
"Booty" (Jennifer Lopez featuring Pitbull)	2014	18	—	—	11	93	78	30	—	—	—	RIAA: Platinum	A.K.A.
"Mr. Put It Down" (Ricky Martin featuring Pitbull)	2015	—	91	—	—	—	—	—	—	—	—		Non-album single
"Back It Up" (Prince Royce featuring Jennifer Lopez and Pitbull)	2015	92	—	—	56	—	—	—	40	—	—		Double Vision
"Shake That" (Samantha Jade featuring Pitbull)	2015	—	—	—	—	—	—	—	—	—	—		Nine
"Lady" (Austin Mahone featuring Pitbull)	2016	—	—	—	—	—	—	—	—	—	—		ForMe+You
"All of the Girls" (Cris Cab featuring Pitbull)	2017	—	—	—	—	—	—	—	—	—	—		Non-album singles
"Loca!" (Adassa featuring Pitbull)	2017	—	—	—	—	—	—	—	—	—	—		Non-album singles
"Carnaval" (Claudia Leitte featuring Pitbull)	2018	—	—	—	—	—	—	—	—	—	—		Non-album singles
"Move to Miami" (Enrique Iglesias featuring Pitbull)	2018	—	—	—	—	—	—	—	91	81	—		Final
"Goalie Goalie" (Arash featuring Nyusha, Pitbull and Blanco)	2018	—	—	—	—	—	—	—	—	—	—		Non-album singles
"Body On My" (Loud Luxury featuring Brando, Pitbull and Nicky Jam)	2019	—	—	—	—	—	—	—	—	—	—		Non-album singles
"One Shot - Remix" (Bria Lee featuring Fat Joe and Pitbull)	2019	—	—	—	—	—	—	—	—	—	—		Non-album singles
"Yayo" (Papayo featuring Pitbull and Ky-Mani Marley)	2019	—	—	—	—	—	—	—	—	—	—		Non-album singles
"Slowly Slowly" (Guru Randhawa featuring Pitbull)	2019	—	—	—	—	—	—	—	—	—	—		Non-album singles
"Tocame" (Elettra Lamborghini featuring Pitbull and ChildsPlay)	2019	—	—	—	—	—	—	—	—	—	—		Twerking Queen
"Ay Ay Ay" (Kim Viera featuring Pitbull)	2019	—	—	—	—	—	—	—	—	—	—		Non-album singles
"Further Up (Na, Na, Na, Na, Na)" (Static & Ben El featuring Pitbull)	2020	—	—	—	—	—	—	—	—	—	—		Non-album singles
"Suda" (Melanie Pfirrman featuring Pitbull and IAmChino)	2020	—	—	—	—	—	—	—	—	—	—		Non-album singles
"Te Quiero Amar" (Akon featuring Pitbull)	2020	—	—	—	—	—	—	—	—	—	—		El Negreeto
"Te Quiero Baby (I Love You Baby)" (Chesca and Pitbull featuring Frankie Valli)	2020	—	—	—	—	—	—	—	—	—	—	RIAA: Gold (Latin)	Alter Ego
"Backpack" (TAG and Pitbull)	2020	—	—	—	—	—	—	—	—	—	—		Non-album singles
"Borracha (Pero Buena Muchacha)" (Vikina, Pitbull and IAmChino)	2020	—	—	—	—	—	—	—	—	—	—		Non-album singles
"Voodoo" (Mr. Mauricio featuring Pitbull, Jencarlos and Konshens)	2020	—	—	—	—	—	—	—	—	—	—		Non-album singles
"Give It to Me" (IAmChino featuring Pitbull and Yomil y El Dany)	2020	—	—	—	—	—	—	—	—	—	—		Non-album singles
"Cosita Linda" (Jencarlos and Pitbull)	2021	—	—	—	—	—	—	—	—	—	—		Non-album singles
"Where the Country Girls At" (Trace Adkins featuring Luke Bryan and Pitbull)	2021	—	—	—	—	—	—	—	—	—	—		Non-album singles
"Flavor" (Jimmie Allen, Pitbull and .teamwork featuring Vikina)	2021	—	—	—	—	—	—	—	—	—	—		Bettie James Gold Edition
"Discoteca" (IAmChino and Pitbull)	2021	—	—	—	—	—	—	—	—	—	—	RIAA: Gold (Latin)	The Most Winning
"Move to Miami" (Enrique Iglesias featuring Pitbull)	2021	—	—	—	—	—	—	—	—	—	—		Final (Vol. 1)
"Hot" (Daddy Yankee featuring Pitbull)	2022	—	—	—	—	—	—	—	61	—	—		Legendaddy
"USA" (Filmore featuring Pitbull)	2022	—	—	—	—	—	—	—	—	—	—		Non-album singles
"Que Se Joda" (Play-N-Skillz with Pitbull and Lil Jon)	2022	—	—	—	—	—	—	—	—	—	—		Non-album singles
"Bandida" (IAmChino featuring Pitbull and Yandel)	2022	—	—	—	—	—	—	—	—	—	—		The Most Winning
"—" denotes a recording that did not chart or was not released in that territory.

=== Promotional singles ===
List of promotional singles, with selected chart positions, showing year released and album name
Title	Year	Peak chart positions								Certifications	Album
Title	Year	US	US Dance	US Latin	AUT	CAN	NZ	SPA	UK	Certifications	Album
"No Llores" (Gloria Estefan featuring Pitbull)	2007	—	—	—	—	—	—	—	—		Non-album singles
"Fresh Out the Oven" (Lola featuring Pitbull)	2009	—	1	—	—	—	—	—	—		Non-album singles
"Blanco" (featuring Pharrell)	2009	—	—	—	—	—	—	—	—		Fast & Furious
"Pearly Gates" (featuring Nayer)	2010	—	—	—	—	—	—	—	—		Non-album singles
"Game On" (with TKZee and Dario G)	2010	—	—	—	—	—	—	—	—		Non-album singles
"Alright" (featuring Machel Montano)	2010	— (Note: "Alright" did not enter the Billboard Hot 100, but peaked at number 18 on the Bubbling Under Hot 100 Singles chart.)	—	—	—	—	—	—	—		Planet Pit (Japan edition)
"Pause"	2011	73	—	—	73	44	33	42	96	RIAA: Gold	Planet Pit
"Turn Around, Pt. 2" (Flo Rida featuring Pitbull)	2011	—	—	—	—	—	—	—	—		The Hangover Part II
"Shake Señora" (featuring T-Pain and Sean Paul)	2011	69	—	42	—	33	40	—	—		Planet Pit
"Echa Pa'lla (Manos Pa'rriba)" (featuring Papayo)	2012	—	—	2	—	—	—	—	—	RIAA: Gold	Global Warming
"Free.K"	2015	—	—	—	—	—	—	90	—		Climate Change
"Freedom"	2016	—	—	—	40	—	—	—	56		Climate Change
"Bad Man" (featuring Robin Thicke, Joe Perry and Travis Barker)	2016	—	—	—	—	—	—	46	—		Climate Change
"Mucho Booty" (featuring Farruko and Micha)	2017	—	—	—	—	—	—	—	—		Non-album singles
"Muévelo Loca Boom Boom"	2017	—	—	—	—	—	—	—	—		Non-album singles
"Free Free Free" (featuring Theron Theron)	2018	—	—	—	—	—	—	—	—		Non-album singles
"La Reina De Blanco" (featuring Chesca, Giorgio Moroder and Raney Shockne)	2019	—	—	—	—	—	—	—	—		Non-album singles
"Cinco de Mayo" (with Lil Jon featuring Chesca)	2020	—	—	—	—	—	—	—	—		Libertad 548
"Takes 3" (record pool release only) (with Vikina)	2022	—	—	—	—	—	—	—	—		Non-album single
"Let's Take a Shot" (with Vikina)	2023	—	—	—	—	—	—	—	—		Trackhouse
"Suave" (with Elvis Crespo)	2023	—	—	—	—	—	—	—	—		Trackhouse
"Lit in the City" (with T-Pain and El Micha)	2023	—	—	—	—	—	—	—	—		Trackhouse
"It Takes 3" (with Vikina)	2023	—	—	—	—	—	—	—	—		Trackhouse
"—" denotes a recording that did not chart or was not released in that territory.

== Other charted songs ==
List of songs, with selected chart positions, showing year released and album name
Title	Year	Peak chart positions								Album
Title	Year	US Latin	AUT	CAN	FRA	GER	NOR	NZ	UK	Album
"Superstar" (Jump Smokers featuring Pitbull and Qwote)	2010	—	41	—	—	—	—	—	—	Kings of the Dancefloor!
"Come n Go" (featuring Enrique Iglesias)	2011	—	—	76	—	—	—	—	—	Planet Pit
"Castle Made of Sand" (featuring Kelly Rowland and Jamie Drastik)	2011	—	—	—	—	—	—	37	—	Planet Pit
"Everybody Fucks" (featuring Akon and David Rush)	2012	—	—	—	—	—	19	—	—	Global Warming
"Pas touché" (Maître Gims featuring Pitbull)	2013	—	—	—	90	—	—	—	—	Subliminal
"Balada (Tche Tcherere Tche Tche)" (Gusttavo Lima featuring Alex Sensation, Pitbull, Sensato and David Zonarosa)	2013	2	—	—	—	—	—	—	—	Non-album single
"Fire" (Jason Derulo featuring Pitbull)	2013	—	—	—	—	91	—	—	162	Tattoos
"That High" (featuring Kelly Rowland)	2013	—	—	76	—	—	—	—	—	Meltdown
"—" denotes a recording that did not chart or was not released in that territory.

== Guest appearances ==
List of non-single guest appearances, with other performing artists, showing year released and album name
Title	Year	Other artist(s)	Album
"Suck This Dick"	2001	Luke, Cam'ron	Somethin' Nasty
"Lollipop"	2001	Luke, Lil' Zane	Somethin' Nasty
"Pitbull's Cuban Rideout"	2002	Lil Jon & the Eastside Boyz	Kings of Crunk
"Get Low" (Merengue Remix)	2003	Lil Jon & the Eastside Boyz, Ying Yang Twins	Part II
"Salt Shaker" (Extended Remix)	2004	Ying Yang Twins, Lil Jon, Murphy Lee, Fat Joe, Fatman Scoop, Jacki-O, Juvenile, B.G.	My Brother & Me
"Gasolina" (Remix)	2004	Daddy Yankee, N.O.R.E., Lil' Jon	—N/a
"Trees"	2005	Baby Bash, Angel Dust	Super Saucy
"Jump and Spread Out" (Reggaeton Remix)	2005	Miri Ben-Ari, Fatman Scoop, Zion & Lennox	The Hip-Hop Violinist
"Hit the Floor"	2005	Twista	The Day After
"Dance Floor" (Remix)	2005	T-Pain	Rappa Ternt Sanga
"Holla at Cha Homeboy"	2006	Luke, Petey Pablo	My Life & Freaky Times
"El Loco Soy Yo"	2006	Sinful	Behind 16 Bars
"Get To Poppin'" (Latino Remix)	2006	Sinful, Sick Jacken, Chino XL	Behind 16 Bars
"Talk Hard"	2006	Twista, E-40	Tailwinds, Vol. 2
"Money In Da Bank"	2007	B.o.B.	Cloud 9
"Tipper"	2007	B.o.B., Willie Joe	Cloud 9
"Show Stopper" (Remix)	2007	B.o.B.	Cloud 9
"Low" (Remix)	2008	Flo Rida, T-Pain	The Flo Rida Cash Cartel
"Stop Traffic"	2008	Trina	Still da Baddest
"Here I Am" (Remix)	2008	Avery Storm	Non-album single
"Defend Dade"	2008	DJ Khaled, Casely	We Global
"Bitch I'm From Dade County" (Remix)	2009	DJ Khaled, Trick Daddy, Trina, Rick Ross, Brisco, Flo Rida, C-Ride, Dre	none
"Yayo"	2009	Flo Rida, Brisco, Billy Blue, Ball Greezy, Rick Ross, Red Eyezz, Bred, Ace Hood	R.O.O.T.S.
"I'm In Miami Bitch" (Remix)	2009	LMFAO	I'm In Your City Trick
"I'm In Diego Bitch"	2009	LMFAO	I'm In Your City Trick
"Live Your Life" (Remix)	2009	T.I., Rihanna	non-album single
"Helpless"	2009	Backstreet Boys	This Is Us
"Pitbull Intro"	2010	Jamie Drastik	The Magnet
"All Day"	2010	Jamie Drastik	The Magnet
"Rep My City"	2010	DJ Khaled, Jarvis	Victory
"How Low" (Remix)	2010	Ludacris, Ciara	Battle of the Sexes
"Work It Out"	2010	Lil Jon	Crunk Rock
"Rock It Like It's Spring Break"	2010	Jump Smokers	Kings of the Dancefloor!
"Superstar"	2010	Jump Smokers, Qwote	Kings of the Dancefloor!
"Rock It Like It's Spring Break" (Reydon Remix)	2010	Jump Smokers	Kings of the Dancefloor!
"Take Ova"	2010	Shontelle	No Gravity
"Tonight (I'm Lovin' You)" (Remix)	2010	Enrique Iglesias	Tonight (I'm Lovin' You)
"Save Me"	2011	Jamie Drastik	Champagne and Cocaine
"One More Time"	2011	Jamie Drastik	Champagne and Cocaine
"Put It On Me"	2011	Benny Benassi	Electroman
"Danza Kuduro" (Throw Your Hands Up)	2011	Lucenzo, Qwote	Emigrante del Mundo
"Aleluya"	2011	Romeo Santos	Formula, Vol. 1 (Deluxe edition)
"There She Goes"	2011	Taio Cruz	TY.O
"It's Not You (It's Me)"	2011	T-Pain, Chuckie	Revolver
"Candy"	2012	Far East Movement	Dirty Bass
"Feel Alive"	2012	Fergie, DJ Poet	Step Up Revolution
"Can I Get"	2012	T-Pain	Stoic
"Gimme Dat Ass"	2012	Sidney Samson & Akon	—N/a
"Stronger" (Remix)	2012	Kanye West, Daft Punk	—N/a
"You're Ma Chérie"	2013	DJ Antoine	Sky Is the Limit
"Scream & Shout" (Motiff Trap Remix)	2013	will.i.am, Britney Spears	—N/a
"Beautiful"	2013	Frankie J	Faith, Hope y Amor
"Pas touché"	2013	Maître Gims	Subliminal
"I Love You... Te Quiero"	2013	Belinda	Catarsis
"Get Lucky" (Remix)	2013	Daft Punk, Pharrell Williams	—N/a
"Fire"	2013	Jason Derulo	Tattoos
"Kick Up Your Heels"	2013	Jessica Mauboy	Beautiful
"Dame Tu Amor (Gimme Your Love)"	2013	Pee Wee	Vive2Life
"Jam On It"	2013	Mr. Mauricio, Rick Ross, Fat Joe	—N/a
"Let Me Be Your Lover"	2014	Enrique Iglesias	Sex and Love
"3 Letters"	2014	Enrique Iglesias	Sex and Love
"Control"	2014	Wisin, Chris Brown	El Regreso del Sobreviviente
"America"	2014	Nick Cannon	White People Party Music
"Oye 2014"	2014	Santana	Corazón
"Booty"	2014	Jennifer Lopez	A.K.A.
"Don't Tell Em" (Remix)	2014	Jeremih	—N/a
"Blank Space" (Remix)	2015	Taylor Swift	—N/a
"Coco"	2015	J Balvin, O.T. Genasis, Coucheron	—N/a
"That's How I'm Feelin'"	2015	Ciara, Missy Elliott	Jackie
"Shake That"	2015	Samantha Jade	Nine
"Wicked" (Victor Magan & Salgado Remix)	2015	Veronica Vega, Victor Magan, Salgado	
"Get Loose"	2015	Cube 1, Qwote	
"She's My Summer"	2015	Honorebel, Lotus	
"If I Would Stay"	2015	MO.NO, Honorebel, Vassy	
"No Doubt About It"	2015	Jussie Smollett	Empire: Original Soundtrack Season 2 Volume 1
"Heaven Knows"	2015	Davis Redfield, Tash	non-album single
"SummerThing" (Remix)	2015	Afrojack, Mike Taylor	SummerThing
"When I'm With You"	2015	Lotus, Sonic Acoustic, A. Rose Jackson	—N/a
"Only Love"	2015	Shaggy, Gene Noble	non-album single
"Que Lo Que" (Remix)	2015	Sensato, Papayo, El Chevo	—N/a
"Asesina"	2015	Yandel	Dangerous
"Never Let You Go"	2015	Farruko	Visionary
"Mi Alma Se Muere" (Remix)	2015	Fuego, Omega	
"On Purpose" (Remix)	2015	Dougie F, 40 Cobras	
"Commas" (Remix)	2015	Messiah, Tali	
"The Water Dance" (Remix)	2015	Chris Porter	
"La Gozadera" (Mr. Worldwide Remix)	2015	Gente de Zona, Marc Anthony	La Gozadera
"Ay Mi Dios"	2016	IAmChino, Yandel, CHACAL	
"Killer Fiddle"	2016	Barnes	
"Sun Don't Let Me Down"	2016	Keith Urban	Ripcord
"When She Dances"	2016	Stephen Marley	Revelation Pt. 2 – The Fruit of Life
"In My Feelings" (Remix)	2017	Verse Simmonds, Akon, Ayo Jay	—N/a
"Mi Gente" (Worldwide Remix)	2017	J Balvin, Willy William, Mohombi	Mi Gente
"Stuck On U"	2018	DJ Antoine, ASF, David Rush	The Time Is Now
"Couldn't Be Better (Movie Version)"	2019	Kelly Clarkson, Uglydolls Cast	Uglydolls
"The Big Finale"	2019	Uglydolls Cast	Uglydolls
"Subelo (Further Up)"	2020	Static & Ben El, Chesca	Further Up (Na, Na, Na, Na, Na)
"Damn I Love Miami"	2020	Lil Jon	Bad Boys for Life
"Beside U"	2020	Monsta X	All About Luv
"Give It To Me (Remix)"	2021	IAmChino, Yomil y El Dany, Lary Over, La Perversa, Nino Freestyle	—N/a
"Bandida"	2022	IAmChino, Yandel	The Most Winning

== DVDs ==
Title	Details
Pitbull: Live at Rock in Rio	Released: November 26, 2012; Label: Polo Grounds, RCA, Mr. 305
