= Original Hits =

Compilation album by Pitbull
- Released: May 8, 2012
- Genre: Hip hop; Latin hip hop; reggaeton
- Length: 68:29
- Language: English; Spanish
- Label: The Orchard

Pitbull chronology
Money Is Still a Major Issue (2005)	Original Hits (2012)	International Takeover (2013)

Original Hits is a retrospective compilation album by Cuban artist Pitbull, spanning the 2004 to 2008 period of his career when he was signed to TVT Records (now-defunct). It was released in the United States on May 8, 2012, by The Orchard who bought all of the rights to TVT's assets and previous catalogs, and later that same month in Australia and the United Kingdom. Original Hits features several of Pitbull's guest appearances, remixes and some unreleased tracks. It does not contain any of his more recent hit singles.

Pitbull acknowledged that album at the time of its release by saying "I wouldn’t be where I am today without these songs. Each one represents a step on my journey from Mr. 305 to Mr. Worldwide. This album is a good introduction for newer fans and a reminder to longtime fans of how far we’ve come together." Despite not being promoted with any singles or marketing initiatives, Original Hits charted in the top-twenty on the U.S. Independent Albums, R&B Albums and Rap Albums charts, as published by Billboard. It also charted at number 136 on the main Billboard 200 albums chart.

== Critical reception ==
David Jeffries praised the choice of singles included from the 2004 to 2008 period of Pitbull's career, pick out "the spicy crunk anthem "The Anthem," the hypnotic reggaeton floor filler "Culo," and the raw, pounding "Bojangles," all of them sounding flashy, big, and like the start of a penthouse pool party where every beer has a lime on top." He also said that the choice of album tracks to complete the compilation were strong and that hardcore fans would appreciate the three bonus tracks, previously unreleased or from mixtapes.

== Track listing ==
No.	Title	Producer(s)	Length
1.	"The Anthem [Intro]" (featuring Lil Jon)	Mattos, Armando C. Perez	4:04
2.	"Culo" (featuring Lil Jon)	Smith, Perez	3:39
3.	"Go Girl" (featuring Trina and Young Bo$$)	Bowen-Petterson, Perez	3:49
4.	"Hey You Girl"	Jim Jonsin, Perez, Wilson	3:46
5.	"Dammit Man" (Remix) (featuring Lil' Flip)	Johnsin, Perez, Scheffer	3:46
6.	"Bojangles" (Remix) (featuring Ying Yang Twins and Lil Jon)	Holmes, Jackson, Perez	4:29
7.	"Midnight" (featuring Casely)	Jacob Aminov, Pérez	3:32
8.	"Ay Chico (Lengua Afuera)"	Mr. Collipark	3:25
9.	"Descarada (Dance)" (featuring Vybz Kartel)	Don "Vendetta" Bennett	3:02
10.	"Que Tu Sabes D'eso" (featuring Fat Joe & Sinful)	Oak, Andrew "Papa Justifi" Wansel	4:03
11.	"Come See Me"	DJ Toomp	3:07
12.	"Fuego"	Mr. Collipark	3:49
13.	"Voodoo"	Lil Jon	3:47
14.	"Toma" (featuring Lil Jon)	Perez, Smith	3:33
15.	"Shake" (Ying Yang Twins featuring Pitbull)	Mr. Collipark, Holmes, Jackson, Kranz, Perez, Scott	4:01
16.	"Lemonhead Delight" (featuring Vedo-No Shake & Bang) (bonus track)	Perez	4:45
17.	"Guilty By Association" (bonus track)	The Diaz Brothers	3:58
18.	"Se Acabó" (bonus track)	Perez	3:54

== Charts ==
Chart (2012–13)	Peak position
U.S. Billboard 200	134
U.S. Independent Albums (Billboard)	20
U.S. R&B Albums (Billboard)	19
U.S. Rap Albums (Billboard)	13

== Release history ==
Country	Date	Format	Label
United States	May 8, 2012	Compact disc (CD)	The Orchard
United States	May 8, 2012	Digital download	The Orchard
Australia	May 25, 2012	Compact disc (CD)	The Orchard
United Kingdom	May 29, 2012	Compact disc (CD)	The Orchard
United Kingdom	May 29, 2012	Digital download	The Orchard
