= Can't Stop Us Now =

Can't Stop Us Now may refer to

- "Can't Stop Us Now", a 2022 song by Pitbull and Zack Brown; see Pitbull discography
- "Can't Stop Us Now", a 2026 song by U2 from Carnaval de Luz
