= Category 6 (album) =

2008 album by DJ Laz

Studio album by DJ Laz
- Released: July 29, 2008
- Studio: Circle House Studios; Double R Studios; Limp-A-Lot Studios
- Genre: Hip hop; miami bass
- Length: 45:00
- Label: VIP Music; Federal Distribution
- Producer: DJ Laz; Hugo Diaz; Luis Diaz; Lionel Delao; Tha Otherz; The Blackout Movement

DJ Laz chronology
Pimpin (2000)	Category 6 (2008)

Singles from Category 6
- 1. "Move Shake Drop" Released: April 15, 2008

Category 6 is the sixth studio album by American miami bass producer DJ Laz. It was released on July 29, 2008, via VIP Music and Federal Distribution. The album features guest appearances from Flo Rida, Rick Ross, T-Pain, and Mims among others. The album peaked at number 49 on the Top R&B/Hip-Hop Albums chart, number 23 on the Top Rap Albums chart, and number 18 on the Heatseekers Albums chart. It spawned the only single, "Move Shake Drop", which also made it to the Billboard charts.

== Track listing ==
No.	Title	Length
1.	"Rich Bitch" (featuring Rick Ross)	5:14
2.	"Ready to Go"	3:35
3.	"Move Shake Drop Remix" (featuring Flo-Rida & Casely)	3:10
4.	"She Can Get It" (featuring Mims, Elijah & Odd Ballaz)	3:25
5.	"Block Party"	4:36
6.	"Girls"	3:17
7.	"So Fresh So Fly" (featuring Yungen)	3:24
8.	"Morena "08"" (featuring T-Pain)	2:48
9.	"Who Is DJ Laz" (featuring Red Rat)	3:59
10.	"Dale Candela" (featuring Sito Rocks)	3:13
11.	"My Baby" (featuring Elijah)	3:54
12.	"Bottom of the Map" (featuring Charles Sweeting, Dirty Red, J-Perk & U.B.)	4:19
Total length:		45:00

== Personnel ==
- Lazaro Mendez – main artist, producer
- Danny "Styles" Schofield – producer, engineer, mixing
- Winston Thomas – producer, engineer, mixing
- Lionel "Deadbeat" De La O – producer, engineer
- Luis Alejandro Diaz – producer
- Hugo Andres Diaz – producer
- Tha Otherz – producer
- Colin Michaels – engineer, mixing
- Carla Humphries – engineer
- Marcus Trotman – engineer
- Jose Blanco – mastering
- Elijah – featured artist (tracks: 4, 11)
- William Leonard Roberts II – featured artist (track 1)
- Wallace Whigfield Wilson – featured artist (track 9)
- Shawn Tapiwa Mims – featured artist (track 4)
- Tramar Lacel Dillard – featured artist (track 3)
- Faheem Rashad Najm – featured artist (track 8)
- Jean-Carlos Casely – featured artist (track 3)
- Charles Sweeting – featured artist (track 12)
- Dirt E Red – featured artist (track 12)
- J-Perk – featured artist (track 12)
- Odd Ballaz – featured artist (track 4)
- Sito Rocks – featured artist (track 10)
- U.B. – featured artist (track 12)
- Yungen – featured artist (track 7)

== Charts ==
Chart (2008)	Peak position
US Top R&B/Hip-Hop Albums (Billboard)	49
US Top Rap Albums (Billboard)	23
US Heatseekers Albums (Billboard)	18
