= Shooting Star (David Rush song) =

"Shooting Star (Party Rock Remix)"

Single by David Rush featuring Kevin Rudolf, LMFAO and Pitbull

from the album Feel the Rush Vol. 1
- Released: February 17, 2009
- Recorded: 2007–2008
- Genre: Hip house
- Length: 3:43
- Label: Universal Republic Records; Mr. 305 Inc.; Executive Board Music Group
- Songwriter(s): David Rush; Ali Noordin; Kevin Rudolf; Armando Christian Pérez; I. Asmar
- Producer(s): LMFAO

David Rush singles chronology
"Go Girl" (2007)	"Shooting Star (Party Rock Remix)" (2009)

LMFAO singles chronology
"Shooting Star (Party Rock Remix)" (2009)	"I'm in Miami Bitch" (2009)

Pitbull singles chronology
"Feel It" (2009)	"Shooting Star (Party Rock Remix)" (2009)	"I Know You Want Me (Calle Ocho)" (2009)

Kevin Rudolf singles chronology
"Welcome to the World" (2009)	"Shooting Star (Party Rock Remix)" (2009)	"N.Y.C." (2009)

Music video
- "Shooting Star" on YouTube

"Shooting Star" is the debut solo single of hip hop artist David Rush, from his debut release Feel the Rush Vol. 1. It features Kevin Rudolf, LMFAO, and rapper Pitbull. The single version of the song is the "Party Rock" remix of the original song, which features LMFAO.

== Music video ==
Universal Republic Records shot a music video for the song on late April 2009. It can be watched at YouTube, it shows in most part of the video a galaxy and outer space background, the video opens with LMFAO presenting David Rush, Kevin Rudolf and Pitbull. Directed by David Rosseau.

== In popular culture ==
The song was used at the 9th edition of the Miss Earth Pageant celebrated in Boracay, Philippines on November 22, 2009. It was also used in the final dance battle of the 2010 film Step Up 3D along with "Move Shake Drop" by DJ Laz.

== Official versions ==
- "Shooting Star" (Album version) featuring Kevin Rudolf & Pitbull

== Chart positions ==
Chart (2009)	Peak position
Canada (Canadian Hot 100)	66
US Billboard Pop 100	33
US Billboard Rhythmic Top 40	9
