= The Boatlift =

Studio album by Pitbull
- Released: November 27, 2007
- Recorded: 2006–2007
- Genres: Crunk; hip hop; hip house
- Length: 58:43
- Labels: TVT; Poe Boy
- Producers: Lil Jon; Mr. Collipark; Nitti; Soundz; Diaz Brothers; Play-n-Skillz

Pitbull chronology
El Mariel (2006)	The Boatlift (2007)	Pitbull Starring in Rebelution (2009)

Singles from The Boatlift
- 1. "Go Girl" Released: 2007; 2. "The Anthem" Released: March 4, 2007; 3. "Sticky Icky" Released: May 15, 2007; 4. "Secret Admirer" Released: November 27, 2007

The Boatlift is the third studio album by Cuban-American rapper Pitbull. It was released on November 27, 2007 through TVT and Poe Boy. The album features production by Lil Jon, Mr. Collipark, Nitti, Diaz Brothers and Sean "P. Diddy" Combs who served as executive producer with Pitbull. It also features guest appearances by Trick Daddy, Lil Jon, Twista, Jim Jones, Jason Derulo and Don Omar among others.

The Boatlift spawned four singles: "Go Girl", "The Anthem", "Secret Admirer", and "Sticky Icky". The album received generally positive reviews from music critics but received small commercial success despite critical acclaim. It debuted at number 50 on the US Billboard 200 chart, selling 22,398 copies in its first week.

== Critical reception ==
Professional ratings
Aggregate scores
Source	Rating
Metacritic	69/100
Review scores
Source	Rating
AllMusic	3/5 stars
DJBooth	3.5/5 stars
Okayplayer	4/5 stars
RapReviews	7.5/10
Slant Magazine	3/5 stars

The Boatlift garnered a positive reception from music critics. At Metacritic, which assigns a normalized rating out of 100 to reviews from mainstream critics, the album received an average score of 69, based on five reviews.

Patrick Taylor of RapReviews praised the album's versatile production for going beyond crunk music and showing depth in club anthems, concluding that "Pitbull continues to prove himself as an MC who is able to bridge Latin hip hop and Southern hip hop, creating a sound that should appeal to fans from both camps. He may not be the deepest lyricist on earth, and his attempts at bedroom music may fall flat, but he makes a mean soundtrack for a night out." DJBooth's Nathan Slavik praised Pitbull for exploring vastly different genres to create party tracks with a worldview appeal and doing them with a talented cast of featured artists and producers, saying that "The Boatlift isn’t going to expand your intellectual or spiritual horizons, but it is without question a go-to album for all your booty-shakin needs." Jose Davila of Vibe also praised the album's genre-hopping production mixing well with Pitbull's bilingual, charismatic flow, saying that it "solidifies Pitbull's position as one of the most diverse party MCs around. And little else."

Wilson McBee of Slant Magazine said that, "For better or worse, the story of Boatlift concerns more the production and song structures than Pitbull’s own rapping. It’s clear he’d rather be a chorus-shouter than a verse-spitter, or at least he believes that will help him sell more records." AllMusic's David Jeffries commended the production and lyrical hooks for being catchy but felt that it lacked a sense of personality and talent compared to El Mariel, saying to consider The Boatlift "a fun floor-filler, but just not up to Pitbull's usual standards." A writer for Music for America felt that Pitbull was wasting his talent throughout the record rhyming typical club tracks and party jams and would like to see him collaborate with artists like Little Brother, 2Mex, Deep Thinkers and Roots Manuva.

== Commercial performance ==
The Boatlift debuted at number 50 on the US Billboard 200 chart, selling 22,398 copies in its first week. In its second week, the album dropped to number 134 on the chart, selling an additional 9,686 copies. As of April 2009, the album has sold 131,000 copies in the United States.

== Track listing ==
The Boatlift track listing
No.	Title	Writer(s)	Producer(s)	Length
1.	"A Little Story (Intro)"	Armando C. Perez		1:08
2.	"Go Girl" (featuring Trina and Young Bo$$)	A. C. Pérez; David Bowen-Petterson; Kenneth Coby	Soundz	3:49
3.	"Dukey Love" (featuring Trick Daddy and Fabo)	A. C. Pérez; Michael Crooms; Lefabian Williams; Maurice Young	Mr. Collipark	3:45
4.	"I Don't See 'Em" (featuring Cubo & AIM)	A. C. Pérez; Brian Rodriguez; Esteban Trujillo; Frank Roman	Tru	3:59
5.	"Midnight" (featuring Casely)	A. C. Pérez; Gravriel Aminov	Vein	3:32
6.	"Ying & the Yang"	A. C. Pérez; LaMarquis Jefferson; Craig Love; Larry "Detroit" Nix; Jonathan Smith	Lil Jon; Keke & Amy (coordinators)	3:27
7.	"The Anthem" (featuring Lil Jon)	A. C. Pérezs; Calixto Ochoa; Wilfredo Martínez Matos; Rune Reilly Kölsch	Lil Jon; Albert Castillo; Rich "DJ Riddler" Pangilinan	4:05
8.	"The Truth (Interlude)"	A. C. Pérez		0:54
9.	"Candyman" (featuring Twista)	A. C. Pérez; Paul "Echo" Irizarry; Armando "Diesel" Rosario; Carl Mitchell	Brown Thugz; Diesel; Echo	3:11
10.	"Sticky Icky" (featuring Jim Jones)	A. C. Pérez; J. Smith; Joseph Jones II	Lil Jon	3:42
11.	"My Life" (featuring Jason Derulo)	A. C. Pérez; Lionel "Deadbeat" Delao; Adrian Santalla	Lionel "Deadbeat" Delao; Adrian Santalla	3:44
12.	"Secret Admirer" (featuring Lloyd)	A. C. Pérez; Carlton "Carl Mo" Mahone Jr.; Rodney Terry; Juan Salinas; Oscar Salinas	Play-N-Skillz	3:18
13.	"Get Up / Levantate"	A. C. Pérez; J. Salinas; O. Salinas; Robert Ford Jr.; James B. Moore III; Kurtis Walker; Larry Smith; Russell Simmons	Play-N-Skillz	3:17
14.	"Fuego (DJ Buddha Remix)" (featuring Don Omar)	A. C. Pérez; M. Crooms; William Landrón Rivera; Tony Butler	Mr. Collipark; Tom Slick	3:49
15.	"Stripper Pole (Remix)" (featuring Toby Love)	A. C. Pérez; Eddie Pérez; Rafael Martinez; Michael Pierre; Octavio Rivera	Eddie Perez	3:56
16.	"Un Poquito" (featuring Yung Berg)	A. C. Pérez; Matthew "110% Pure" Bradley; Christian Ward	110% Pure; Big Lo	3:42
17.	"Tell Me (Remix)" (featuring Frankie J & Ken-Y)	A. C. Perez; J. Smith; Francisco Bautista Jr.; Kenny Vasquez	Lil Jon	4:34
18.	"Mr. 305 (Outro)"	A. C. Pérez		0:45
Total length:				58:43

Sample credits

- "Go Girl" contains a sample of "Big Poppa" performed by The Notorious B.I.G., and "Party Like a Rockstar" performed by Trina.
- "The Anthem" contains a sample of "El Africano" performed by Wilfrido Vargas and "Calabria 2007"
- "Candyman" contains a sample of "Breathe In Breathe Out" performed by Kanye West featuring Ludacris performed by ENUR and Natasja.
- "Secret Admirer" contains a sample of "My Boo" performed by Ghost Town DJ's.
- "Fuego (DJ Buddha Remix)" – remix of "Fuego" from Pitbull's album El Mariel.
- "Stripper Pole (Remix)" – remix of the Toby Love song "Stripper Pole" performed with KP Da Moneymaker; original version appears on Toby Love's self-titled album.
- "Tell Me (Remix)" – remix of the Ken-Y song "Dime"; original version appears on the album Masterpiece.

== Personnel ==
- Pitbull – lead vocals
- AIM – guest vocals (4)
- Kori Anders – assistant audio mixing (16)
- Keith Bizz – audio mixing (5)
- Leslie Brathwaite – audio mixing (16)
- Reather Bryant – percussion (14)
- Al Burna – recording engineer (1, 5, 8–9, 14, 17–18)
- Josh Butler – recording engineer (12)
- Casely – additional vocals (5)
- Albert Castillo – recording engineer, audio mixing (7)
- Juan "Juan Ya" Chavis – background vocals (15)
- Steven Cruz – guitar (15)
- Cubo – guest vocals, recording engineer (4)
- Ryan Deaunovich – bongos
- Juan "John Q." DeJesus – background vocals (15)
- Miguel DeJesus – background vocals (15)
- DJ Buddha – remixing (14)
- DJ Ideal – recording engineer (4)
- Fabo – additional vocals (3)
- Steve Fisher – recording engineer (12)
- Jonathan "JaShell" Gelabert – background vocals (15)
- Adam Gomez – bass guitar (15)
- Danny Guira – guiro
- Eddie Hernandez – assistant audio mixing (2, 12, 14)
- LaMarquis Jefferson – bass guitar (6)
- Harold Jones – percussion (14)
- Julissa – background vocals (15)
- Dawin Lapache – guitar, bass guitar (15)
- Ari Levine – recording engineer (16)
- Lil Jon – audio mixing (6)
- Craig Love – guitar (6)
- Toby Love – vocal arrangement, background vocals (15)
- Jose "Jumanji Guira" Martinez – guiro (15)
- Rafael Martinez – background vocals (15)
- Ping "A. Fuegoski" Montana – bongos (15)
- Detroit Nix – keyboards (6)
- Steve Obas – recording engineer (2)
- Rich DJ Riddler Pangilinan – audio production, producer (7)
- Eddie "Scarlito" Perez – piano, all keyboards, vocal arrangement, recording engineer, audio mixing (15)
- Raulito – bongos
- Leroy S. Romans – piano, all keyboards, background vocals (15)
- Adrian "Drop" Santalla – recording engineer (2, 11, 13)
- Young Rico Scott – percussion (14)
- Ray Seay – audio mixing (2–3, 6, 9–12, 14, 17)
- Stephen Siravo Jr. – assistant audio mixing (15)
- Justin Trawick – assistant audio mixing (16)
- Trina – additional vocals (2)
- Yaharia Vargas – background vocals (15)
- Andrea Venezuela – additional vocals (16)
- Mark Vinten – recording engineer (6, 10, 17)

== Charts ==
Chart performance for The Boatlift
Chart (2007)	Peak position
US Billboard 200	50
US Independent Albums (Billboard)	7
US Top R&B/Hip-Hop Albums (Billboard)	13
US Top Rap Albums (Billboard)	2

== Bibliography ==
Baker, Geoff (2005), ""La Habana que no conoces": Cuban rap and the social construction of urban space", Ethnomusicology Forum, vol. 15, no. 2, pp. 215–246.

"Pitbull: El Capitan", Giant Magazine, New York City, New York, December 6, 2007, archived from the original on September 23, 2008.

Kalikwest Publication Group (March 24, 2005), "Pitbull On", MySpace Music.

"Who Is Pitbull: Biography", The Pitbull Official Site, March 24, 2005.
