= Secret admirer (disambiguation) =

Secret admirer may refer to:

- Secret admirer, an individual who has feelings of affection towards another person without revealing their identity to the object of their affection
- Secret Admirer (film), 1985 film directed by David Greenwalt starring C. Thomas Howell and Lori Loughlin
- Secret Admirer (soundtrack) for the 1985 film directed by David Greenwalt
- "Secret Admirer" (Frasier), the sixth episode in season six of American situation comedy Frasier
- Secret Admirer (song), a song by American rapper Pitbull
