= Get Ready (Pitbull song) =

Single by Pitbull featuring Blake Shelton

from the album Libertad 548
- Released: February 7, 2020
- Recorded: 2019
- Genre: Dance-pop, country rap
- Length: 3:35
- Label: Mr. 305
- Songwriters: José Carlos Garcia; Xenia Ghali; Jorge Gomez; Huddie Ledbetter; Armando C. Pérez; Blake Shelton; Jimmy Thörnfeldt; Fernando Zulueta
- Producers: IAmChino, Gomez, Jimmy Joker, Ghali

Pitbull singles chronology
"Suda" (2020)	"Get Ready" (2020)	"Te Quiero Amar" (2020)

Blake Shelton singles chronology
"Nobody but You" (2020)	"Get Ready" (2020)	"Tuesday I'll Be Gone" (2020)

"Get Ready" is a song recorded by American recording artist Pitbull for his eleventh studio album Libertad 548 (2019). The song features guest vocals from American country singer Blake Shelton, and the single version features additional guitar elements from Aerosmith band member Joe Perry. It was written by Pitbull, Shelton, José Carlos Garcia, Xenia Ghali, Jorge Gomez, Huddie Ledbetter, Jimmy Thörnfeldt, and Fernando Zulueta. It was released to American radio stations for airplay on February 7, 2020 as the album's fourth single.

"Get Ready" interpolates the 1977 song "Black Betty" by Ram Jam, and shares the instrumental to "Black Betty's Worldwide" by Xenia Ghali featuring Heymous Molly. Commercially, the song peaked on Billboard's Digital Songs charts in the United States and Canada, at positions 35 and 16, respectively. It also entered the Rap Digital Songs Sales chart at number 11.

== Super Bowl ==
On February 2, 2020, Pitbull was featured in a Super Bowl commercial for Super Bowl LIV, alongside Jennifer Lopez, DJ Khaled, Alex Rodriguez, and Steven Van Zandt. The commercial was produced to promote Hard Rock and its affiliations; the commercial premiered during the 2nd quarter of Super Bowl LIV. The commercial showcases the Seminole Hard Rock Hotel & Casino, which is also where the music video for "Get Ready" was filmed. The music video was released on February 10, 2020.

== Track listing and formats ==
- Album version (from the album Libertad 548 by Pitbull)

Track #6: "Get Ready" (featuring Blake Shelton) – 3:35

- Single
1. "Get Ready" (featuring Blake Shelton and Joe Perry) – 2:19
2. "Get Ready" (featuring Blake Shelton) – 3:35

== Charts ==
Chart performance for "Get Ready"
Chart (2020)	Peak position
Canada Digital Song Sales (Billboard)	16
US Digital Song Sales (Billboard)	35
US Rap Digital Song Sales (Billboard)	11
