= Be Quiet (song) =

Single by Pitbull

from the album El Mariel
- Released: October 31, 2006
- Genre: Crunk
- Length: 3:22
- Label: TVT
- Songwriter(s): Armando Pérez; Mario Antonio González
- Producer(s): Shakespeare

Pitbull singles chronology
"Dime/Tell Me (Remix)" (2006)	"Be Quiet" (2006)	"Holla at Me" (2006)

Music video
- "Be Quiet" on YouTube

"Be Quiet" is a song by American rapper Pitbull, released on October 31, 2006, as the fourth official single from his second studio album, El Mariel (2006). This song was produced by Shakespeare.

== Track listing ==
- Digital download
1. "Be Quiet" – 3:22

== Credits and personnel ==
- Armando C. Perez – songwriter
- Shakespeare - producer

== Release history ==
Region	Date	Format	Label
United States	October 31, 2006	Digital Download	TVT, Bad Boy Latino
