= Bad Boys for Life (soundtrack) =

2020 compilation soundtrack album

Bad Boys for Life: The Soundtrack

Soundtrack album by various artists
- Released: January 17, 2020
- Genre: Hip hop; reggaeton
- Length: 30:56
- Label: We the Best; Epic
- Producer: DJ Khaled (exec.); will.i.am; Beat Billionaire; Buju Banton; Daddy Yankee; Dawg; Dinuzzo; DJ Durel; Keith Harris; LASTNIGHT; Lil' Jon; Lloyd James, Jr.; OmArr; Papamitrou; Play-N-Skillz; Quavo; Rippa on the Beat; Scott Summers; Swede; Westen Weiss

Bad Boys chronology
Bad Boys II (2003)	Bad Boys for Life: The Soundtrack (2020)	Bad Boys: Ride or Die (2024)

Singles from Bad Boys for Life: The Soundtrack
- 1. "Ritmo (Bad Boys for Life)" Released: October 11, 2019; 2. "Muévelo" Released: January 8, 2020; 3. "Damn I Love Miami" Released: September 12, 2025

Professional ratings
Review scores
Source	Rating
HipHopDX	3.3/5
RapReviews	6.5/10

Bad Boys for Life is the soundtrack to Adil El Arbi and Bilall Fallah's 2020 film Bad Boys for Life. It was released on January 17, 2020 via We the Best Music Group/Epic Records, and consists of ten tracks. Its lead single, "Ritmo (Bad Boys for Life)" performed by the Black Eyed Peas and J Balvin, was released on October 11, 2019.

== Original score ==
Bad Boys for Life (Original Motion Picture Score)

Film score by Lorne Balfe
- Released: January 17, 2020
- Length: 24:46
- Label: Sony Classical
- Producer: Lorne Balfe

Lorne Balfe chronology
6 Underground (2019)	Bad Boys for Life (2020)	Songbird (2020)

Lorne Balfe composed the score for Bad Boys for Life. Sony Classical Records released the film's score album on January 17, 2020.

== Track listing ==
Bad Boys for Life track listing
No.	Title	Writer(s)	Producer(s)	Length
1.	"Uptown II" (Meek Mill featuring Farruko)	Robert Williams; Carlos Efrén Reyes Rosado; Franklin Martínez; Marcos Gerardo Pérez; Nikolas Papamitrou; Roberto Curti	Nick Papz; Swede	2:55
2.	"Money Fight" (City Girls)	Caresha Brownlee; Jatavia Johnson; Ricardo Toussaint; Antwaun Arnold; Lasana Smith; Kiari Cephus; Kirsnick Ball; Quavious Marshall	Rippa on the Beat	2:38
3.	"Ritmo" (Black Eyed Peas and J Balvin)	William Adams; Allan Pineda; José Balvin; Keith Harris; Annerley Gordon; Francesco Bontempi; Giorgio Spagna; Michael Gaffey; Pete Glenister	will.i.am	3:42
4.	"Future Bright" (Rick Ross featuring Bryson Tiller)	William Roberts II; Bryson Tiller; Shamann Cooke; Case Woodard; Darryl Young; Inga Marchand; J.B. Weaver Jr.; Kenny Kornegay; Mary J. Blige	Beat Billionaire	2:59
5.	"Bad Moves" (DJ Durel featuring Quavo and Rich the Kid)	Quavious Marshall; Daryl McPherson; Dimitri Roger; Westen Weiss; Ian Lewis	DJ Durel; Quavo; Westen Weiss	2:13
6.	"Muévelo" (Nicky Jam and Daddy Yankee)	Ramón L. Ayala; Nick Rivera Caminero; Juan "Play" Salinas; Oscar "Skillz" Salinas; Charles Chavez; Christopher Kenner; David Macías; Francisco Saldaña; Ini Kamoze; Juan Diego Medina; Kenton Nix; Rafael Aponte; Salaam Remi	Play-N-Skillz; Scott Summers; Daddy Yankee, Luny Tunes	3:15
7.	"Damn I Love Miami" (Pitbull and Lil Jon)	Armando C. Pérez; Jonathan H. Smith; Andrew Frampton; Breyan Isaac; Ernest Lobban-Bean; Luke Calleja	Lil' Jon; Dawg	2:41
8.	"The Hottest" (Jaden Smith)	Jaden Smith; Omarr Rambert; Kyle Edwards; Darrien Overton	OmArr; LASTNIGHT; Dinuzzo	3:21
9.	"Murda She Wrote" (Buju Banton)	Mark Anthony Myrie; Lloyd James, Jr.; Brandon Hess; Jermaine Reid	Buju Banton; Lloyd James, Jr.	3:23
10.	"Ritmo (Remix)" (Black Eyed Peas, J Balvin and Jaden Smith)	William Adams; Allan Pineda; José Balvin; Jaden Smith; Keith Harris; Annerley Gordon; Francesco Bontempi; Giorgio Spagna; Michael Gaffey; Pete Glenister	will.i.am; Keith Harris	3:49
Total length:				30:56

== Charts ==
=== Weekly charts ===
Chart performance for Bad Boys for Life
Chart (2020)	Peak position
UK Soundtrack Albums (OCC)	41
US Soundtracks Albums (Billboard)	3

=== Year-end charts ===
Year-end chart performance for Bad Boys for Life
Chart (2020)	Position
US Soundtrack Albums (Billboard)	25
