= Move Shake Drop =

2008 single by DJ Laz, Flo-Rida and Casely

Single by DJ Laz featuring Flo Rida, Casely and Pitbull

from the album Category 6
- Released: April 15, 2008
- Recorded: 2007
- Genre: Hip hop
- Length: 3:11 (album version); 3:49 (remix with Flo Rida, Casely and Pitbull)
- Label: VIP; Federal
- Songwriters: L. Diaz; H. Diaz; L. Mendez; A. Perez
- Producer: Diaz Brothers

DJ Laz singles chronology
"Facina" (2000)	"Move Shake Drop" (2008)	"She Can Get It" (2008)

Flo Rida singles chronology
"Elevator" (2008)	"Move Shake Drop" (2008)	"In the Ayer" (2008)

Pitbull singles chronology
"Secret Admirer" (2007)	"Move Shake Drop" (2008)	"Krazy" (2008)

"Move Shake Drop" is a song by American disc jockey DJ Laz, released as the first single from his 2008 studio album Category 6. It featured vocals from fellow Americans Flo Rida, Casely and Pitbull. The backing track was composed by production duo the Diaz Brothers, who helped to write the song alongside DJ Laz and Pitbull.

== Composition ==
The song samples the synth hook of Benny Benassi's track "Satisfaction", used as the main basis for the song. Following some disputes, another version with a similar but different melody in the hook was also produced.

== Chart performance ==
"Move Shake Drop" became DJ Laz's first song to appear on the US Billboard Hot 100, enterting the chart at number 86 and peaking at number 56, spending a total of five weeks on the chart. On the US Latin Songs and Rhythmic Top 40 charts, the song reached numbers 49 and 40 respectively; it also spent twelve weeks on the now defunct US Pop 100 chart, entering at number 97 and peaking at 42.

In the Philippines, it was a certified smash hit, and became a staple music of various dance competitions and showdowns in the country.

== Charts ==
Chart (2008)	Peak position
US Billboard Hot 100	56
US Hot Latin Songs (Billboard)	49
US Pop 100 (Billboard)	42
US Rhythmic Top 40 (Billboard)	40

== Release history ==
Country	Date	Format	Label
United States	April 15, 2008	Digital download	VIP Records
United States	June 3, 2008	Rhythmic contemporary radio	VIP Records, Republic Records
