= No Lo Trates =

Single by Pitbull, Natti Natasha and Daddy Yankee

from the album Libertad 548
- Language: Spanish
- English title: "Don't Try It"
- Released: April 26, 2019
- Genre: Reggaeton
- Length: 3:18
- Label: Mr. 305
- Songwriters: Armando C. Pérez; Natalia A. Gutiérrez; Ramón L. Ayala; José C. Jr. García; Jimmy P. Thornfeldt; Jorge G. Martinez; Edgardo A. Franco; Achraf Janussi; Bilal Hajji
- Producers: IAmChino; Jorge Gomez; Jimmy Joker

Pitbull singles chronology
"Slowly Slowly" (2019)	"No Lo Trates" (2019)	"3 to Tango" (2019)

Natti Natasha singles chronology
"Oh Daddy" (2019)	"No Lo Trates" (2019)	"Runaway" (2019)

Daddy Yankee singles chronology
"Soltera (Remix)" (2019)	"No Lo Trates" (2019)	"Runaway" (2019)

"No Lo Trates" (English: "Don't Try It") is an original song by El General, Panamanian artist, ft. Anayka, released in 2001 in the album “Back to the Original.” It has been recently covered by Cuban-American rapper and singer Pitbull, Dominican singer Natti Natasha and Puerto Rican rapper and singer Daddy Yankee. It was released as a single on April 26, 2019, through Pitbull's label Mr. 305 Records, and serves as the lead single from his eleventh studio album Libertad 548.

On January 11, 2020, the song surpassed 100 million streams on Spotify.

== Background ==
The song contains a sample of the chorus of the 1994 song "Rica y Apretadita" by Panamanian rapper El General featuring American singer Anayka.

== Promotion ==
Daddy Yankee shared the single's cover on social media a day before its release, as did Pitbull. Natti teased the fans with the release of photos from the set onto her Instagram stories

On May 6, 2019, the official music video was uploaded to Pitbull's official YouTube channel, and has gained over 210 million views as of May 2020.

The single was performed live by Pitbull, Daddy Yankee, and Natti Natasha at the 2019 Premios Juventud. The performance was uploaded to Pitbull's YouTube channel, and has gained over 1.5 million views as of May 2020.

== Charts ==
=== Weekly charts ===
Chart (2019)	Peak position
Argentina (Argentina Hot 100)	58
Bolivia (Monitor Latino)	11
Chile (Monitor Latino)	3
Ecuador (National-Report)	81
El Salvador (Monitor Latino)	10
Mexico (Billboard Mexican Airplay)	18
Nicaragua (Monitor Latino)	12
Peru (Monitor Latino)	8
Puerto Rico (Monitor Latino)	1
Spain (PROMUSICAE)	60
Switzerland (Schweizer Hitparade)	74
US Hot Latin Songs (Billboard)	15
US Latin Airplay (Billboard)	1
US Latin Rhythm Airplay (Billboard)	1
Venezuela (Monitor Latino)	4
Venezuela (National-Report)	5

=== Year-end charts ===
Chart (2019)	Position
US Hot Latin Songs (Billboard)	30

== Certifications ==
Region	Certification	Certified units/sales
Spain (Promusicae)	Gold	30,000^{‡}
United States (RIAA)	11× Platinum (Latin)	660,000^{‡}
^{‡} Sales+streaming figures based on certification alone.

== See also ==
- List of Billboard number-one Latin songs of 2019
