= Damn I Love Miami =

2025 single by Pitbull and Lil Jon

Single by Pitbull and Lil Jon

from the album Bad Boys for Life: The Soundtrack
- Released: September 12, 2025
- Genre: Hip hop
- Length: 2:41
- Label: Mr. 305 Inc.
- Songwriters: Armando Pérez; Jonathan Smith; Andrew Frampton; Breyan Isaac; Ernest Lobban-Bean; Luke Calleja
- Producers: Lil Jon; Dawg

Pitbull singles chronology
"Soy Así" (2025)	"Damn I Love Miami" (2025)	"Pretty Woman (All Around The World)" (2025)

Lil Jon singles chronology
"I Got Flavor" (2025)	"Damn I Love Miami" (2025)	"Get Down" (2025)

Music video
- "Damn I Love Miami" on YouTube

"Damn I Love Miami" is a song by American rappers Pitbull and Lil Jon from the soundtrack to the 2020 film Bad Boys for Life. It was released as the album's third single on September 12, 2025.

== Critical reception ==
Bernadette Giacomazzo of HipHopDX considered it the standout and "definitive song" from the Bad Boys for Life soundtrack, writing that it "sets the tone for both the rest of the album and the movie itself."

== Charts ==
Chart performance for "Damn I Love Miami"
Chart (2026)	Peak position
Canada Hot 100 (Billboard)	86
US Billboard Hot 100	76
US Pop Airplay (Billboard)	20
US Rhythmic Airplay (Billboard)	6
