= Greatest Hits (Pitbull album) =

Greatest hits album by Pitbull
- Released: December 1, 2017
- Length: 49:06
- Label: RCA

Pitbull chronology
| Climate Change (2017) | Greatest Hits (2017) | Libertad 548 (2019) |

Professional ratings
Review scores
| Source | Rating |
|---|---|
| AllMusic | 4/5 stars |

Greatest Hits is a greatest hits album by American rapper Pitbull. It was released on December 1, 2017, by RCA Records. The compilation consists of songs released between 2009 and 2014. In January 2026, the album peaked at number 54 on the US Billboard 200. The album contains eleven previously released singles and two new songs, "Jungle" and "Locas".

== Critical reception ==
In a review for AllMusic, Neil Yeung wrote: "Kicking off with his two highest-charting singles to date, Greatest Hits is a not-so-subtle reminder of just how deft Pitbull is at creating catchy, upbeat, and celebratory anthems."

Billboard's Tatiana Cirisano listed the album cover as one of the worst of 2017, calling it "a bit over-the-top".

== Commercial performance ==
On the Billboard 200 chart dated the week of July 11, 2024, Greatest Hits reached the milestone of spending 164 weeks on the chart. This became the first album by Pitbull to accomplish the rare feat.

== Track listing ==
Greatest Hits track listing
| No. | Title | Writer(s) | Length |
|---|---|---|---|
| 1. | "Give Me Everything" (featuring Ne-Yo, Afrojack and Nayer) | Armando Pérez; Nick van de Wall; Shaffer Smith | 4:12 |
| 2. | "Timber" (featuring Kesha) | Pérez; Kesha Sebert; Lukasz Gottwald; Priscilla Hamilton; Jamie Sanderson; Breyan Stanley Isaac; Henry Walter; Pebe Sebert; Lee Oskar; Greg Errico | 3:24 |
| 3. | "I Know You Want Me (Calle Ocho)" | Perez; Edward Bello; David Wolinski; Daniel Seraphine; Nicola Fasano; Stefano Bosco; Patrick Gonella | 3:57 |
| 4. | "Don't Stop the Party" (featuring TJR) | Perez; TJ Rozdilsky; José García; Jorge Gomez Martinez; Warwick Lyn; Frederick Hibbert | 3:25 |
| 5. | "Hotel Room Service" | Perez; James Scheffer; Nile Rodgers; Bernard Edwards; Luther Campbell; David Hobbs; Mark Ross; Christopher Wong Won; Hugh Brankin; Ross Campbell; John Reid; Graham Wilson | 3:58 |
| 6. | "Hey Baby (Drop It to the Floor)" (featuring T-Pain) | Perez; Sandy Vee; Faheem Najm | 3:54 |
| 7. | "Rain Over Me" (featuring Marc Anthony) | Perez; Nadir Khayat; Marc Anthony; Bilal "The Chef" Hajji; AJ Janussi; Rachid Aziz | 3:51 |
| 8. | "Time of Our Lives" (featuring Ne-Yo) | Pérez; Lukasz Gottwald; Henry Walter; Shaffer Smith; Stephan Taft; Al Burna | 3:49 |
| 9. | "International Love" (featuring Chris Brown) | Perez; Carsten Shack; Peter Biker; Sean Hurley; Claude Kelly | 3:48 |
| 10. | "Feel This Moment" (featuring Christina Aguilera) | Perez; Nasri Atweh; Adam Messinger; Nolan Lambroza; Vargas; Christina Aguilera; Pal Waaktaar; Morten Harket; Magne Furuholmen | 3:49 |
| 11. | "Fireball" (featuring John Ryan) | Perez; John Ryan; Andreas Schuller; Eric Frederic; Joe Spargur; Tom Peyton; Ilsey Juber | 3:55 |
| 12. | "Jungle" (featuring E-40 and Abraham Mateo) | Perez; Ray Charles McCullough II; Clarence Coffee, Jr.; Ray Romulus; John Ryan; Earl Stevens; Jonathan Yip | 3:29 |
| 13. | "Locas" (featuring Lil Jon) | Perez; Luke Calleja; Jonathan H. Smith | 3:35 |
| Total length: | | | 49:06 |

Greatest Hits Japanese edition track listing
| No. | Title | Writer(s) | Producer(s) | Length |
|---|---|---|---|---|
| 14. | "Celebrate" (from Penguins of Madagascar) (featuring DJ Frank E) | Pérez; Justin Franks; Isaac; Charlie Puth; Andrew Cedar; Ben Maddahi; Dino Fekaris; Nick Zesses | DJ Frank E; Cedar | 3:12 |
| Total length: | | | | 52:18 |

== Charts ==
=== Weekly charts ===
Weekly chart performance for Greatest Hits
| Chart (2017–2026) | Peak position |
|---|---|
| Australian Albums (ARIA) | 6 |
| Australian Hip Hop/R&B Albums (ARIA) | 1 |
| Canadian Albums (Billboard) | 13 |
| Greek Albums (IFPI) | 71 |
| Hungarian Physical Albums (MAHASZ) | 27 |
| Irish Albums (Official Charts) | 6 |
| UK Albums (Official Charts) | 18 |
| US Billboard 200 | 48 |

=== Year-end charts ===
2021 year-end chart performance for Greatest Hits
| Chart (2021) | Position |
|---|---|
| Australian Albums (ARIA) | 60 |
| Canadian Albums (Billboard) | 46 |
| Irish Albums (IRMA) | 43 |
| US Billboard 200 | 148 |

2022 year-end chart performance for Greatest Hits
| Chart (2022) | Position |
|---|---|
| Australian Albums (ARIA) | 50 |
| Canadian Albums (Billboard) | 32 |
| US Billboard 200 | 127 |

2023 year-end chart performance for Greatest Hits
| Chart (2023) | Position |
|---|---|
| Australian Albums (ARIA) | 50 |
| Canadian Albums (Billboard) | 32 |
| UK Albums (OCC) | 77 |
| US Billboard 200 | 132 |

2024 year-end chart performance for Greatest Hits
| Chart (2024) | Position |
|---|---|
| Australian Albums (ARIA) | 46 |
| Australian Hip Hop/R&B Albums (ARIA) | 10 |
| Canadian Albums (Billboard) | 32 |
| UK Albums (OCC) | 57 |
| US Billboard 200 | 107 |

2025 year-end chart performance for Greatest Hits
| Chart (2025) | Position |
|---|---|
| Australian Albums (ARIA) | 23 |
| Canadian Albums (Billboard) | 33 |
| UK Albums (OCC) | 35 |
| US Billboard 200 | 102 |

== Certifications ==
Certifications for Greatest Hits
| Region | Certification | Certified units/sales |
|---|---|---|
| Australia (ARIA) | Platinum | 70,000^{‡} |
| France (SNEP) | Platinum | 100,000^{‡} |
| United Kingdom (BPI) | 2× Platinum | 600,000^{‡} |
^{‡} Sales+streaming figures based on certification alone.
