= Sticky Icky =

Single by Pitbull featuring Jim Jones

from the album The Boatlift
- Released: May 15, 2007
- Recorded: 2006–07
- Genre: Hip house; crunk
- Length: 3:44 (Explicit Version) 3:58 (Clean Version)
- Label: TVT; Bad Boy Latino
- Songwriters: Armando C. Pérez; Jonathan Smith; Joseph Jones II
- Producer: Lil Jon

Pitbull singles chronology
"The Anthem" (2007)	"Sticky Icky" (2007)	"Crazy" (2007)

Jim Jones singles chronology
"Emotionless" (2007)	"Sticky Icky" (2007)	"Now I Can Do That" (2007)

"Sticky Icky" is a song by American hip hop recording artist Pitbull featuring vocals from fellow American rapper Jim Jones. It was released on May 15, 2007 as the third single from Pitbull's third studio album The Boatlift. The song was written by Armando C. Pérez, Jonathan Smith and Joseph G. Jones, while the production was handled by Lil Jon.

== Credits and personnel ==
- Lead vocals – Pitbull, Jim Jones
- Producers – Lil Jon
- Lyrics –Armando C. Perez, Jonathan Smith, Joseph G. Jones
- Label: TVT, Bad Boy Latino

== Release history ==
Region	Date	Format	Label
United States	May 15, 2007	Digital Download	TVT, Bad Boy Latino
