= Libertad 548 =

Studio album by Pitbull
- Released: September 27, 2019
- Recorded: 2018–2019
- Genre: Hip hop; reggaeton
- Length: 51:25
- Language: English; Spanish
- Label: Mr. 305; The Orchard
- Producer: IAmChino; Jorge Gomez; Jimmy Joker; Johnnyboy; G.Bliz; Johan Carlsson; Leo Brooks; Xenia Ghali; Ricky Luna

Pitbull chronology
Greatest Hits (2017)	Libertad 548 (2019)	Trackhouse (2023)

Singles from Libertad 548
- 1. "No Lo Trates" Released: April 26, 2019; 2. "3 to Tango" Released: August 2, 2019; 3. "Me Quedaré Contigo" Released: October 8, 2019; 4. "Get Ready" Released: February 7, 2020; 5. "Mueve La Cintura" Released: June 8, 2020; 6. "Se La Vi" Released: November 27, 2020; 7. "Winning" Released: December 4, 2020; 8. "Tell Me Again" Released: December 18, 2020; 9. "Cantaré" Released: January 4, 2021

Professional ratings
Review scores
Source	Rating
AllMusic	4/5 stars

Libertad 548 is the eleventh studio album by American rapper Pitbull. It was released on September 27, 2019, via Mr. 305 Records. The album also features guest appearances from El Micha, Lenier, Yomil y El Dany, Becky G, Blake Shelton, Chacal, Chesca, Daddy Yankee, Flo Rida, Guru Randhawa, IAmChino, Lil Jon, Ludacris, Natti Natasha, Ne-Yo, Papayo, Prince Royce, Sky Monroe, Tito El Bambino, and Wisin & Yandel.

Libertad 548 failed to enter any major chart in any territory. It debuted at number 12 on US Billboard Top Latin Albums and number 11 on the Latin Rhythm Albums chart selling a little over 3,000 album equivalent units in its first week.

== Singles ==
As the album's lead single, "No Lo Trates" with Daddy Yankee and Natti Natasha became RIAA Latin certified 6× platinum (360,000+ sales).

The album's second single "3 to Tango" went viral for John Travolta's surprise guest appearance in the song's official music video.

The album's third single "Me Quedaré Contigo" (with Ne-Yo featuring Lenier and El Micha) was premiered at the 2019 Latin American Music Awards, peaking at #1 on the Latin Airplay and Latin Rhythm Airplay Billboard charts in the United States.

The album's fourth single "Get Ready" featuring Blake Shelton, which was premiered live by Pitbull at the Super Bowl LIV Tailgate Tropicale pre-game show, was later added to the "Dale Más" advertising campaign for a series of pre-game Super Bowl commercials for Super Bowl LIV, and a remixed version of the single serves as the official theme song for the 2020 NASCAR Cup Series.

The album's fifth single, "Mueve La Cintura" featuring Tito El Bambino and Guru Randhawa was released on June 8, 2020. An accompanying music video, which was filmed in 2019 and directed by David Rousseau, was also premiered on that same date.

The album's sixth single, "Se La Vi" featuring IAmChino and Papayo, was released on November 27, 2020 (Black Friday). An accompanying music video, which was directed by David Rousseau, was also released on that same date. The release of this single from Libertad 548 gives the album the most singles out of any of the ten previous studio albums by Pitbull.

The album's seventh single, "Winning" featuring Yomil y El Dany, is a part of the Boost Mobile "Dale Más" advertising campaign. The official lyric video was released on December 4, 2020, on Pitbull's official YouTube channel.

The album's eighth single, "Tell Me Again" featuring Prince Royce and Ludacris, was released as a single on December 18, 2020. Accompanying the release was the official music video, directed by Gil Green in 2018. The music video primarily used excerpts from the "Quiero Saber" music video, but colorized and with additional scenes. "Tell Me Again" became the fifth single from Libertad 548 in 2020 alone, and the sixth single following the album's release in September 2019.

The album's ninth single, "Cantare" featuring Lenier, was released as a single on January 4, 2021. The song was Pitbull's first single of 2021, and was the first of the two album bonus tracks to be released as a single. The official music video, which was filmed in 2020, was released on Pitbull's official YouTube channel on that same date.

=== Promotional singles ===
The album's first and only promotional single, "Cinco de Mayo" with Lil Jon featuring Chesca, was released on May 5, 2020 (Cinco de Mayo). The promotional single was performed live with a surprise guest appearance by John Travolta at the Premio Lo Nuestro 2020 (accompanied by "3 to Tango" and "Get Ready"), accumulating over 5 million views on YouTube as of April 2022.

=== Other songs ===
"Mala" and "Moviéndolo" were released as singles in remix forms, adding new artists to the tracks. "Mala (Remix)" was released as a single on July 17, 2022, which featured De La Ghetto having his own verse. The release was later accompanied in September of the same year with a music video. "Moviéndolo (Remix)" was released as a single on October 21, 2020, adding El Alfa into the mix with his own tempo changing segue. The release was performed live by the artists at the Billboard Latin Music Awards 2020.

== Track listing ==
No.	Title	Writer(s)	Producer(s)	Length
1.	"Winning" (with Yomil y El Dany)	Armando C. Pérez; Roberto Borgendry Hidalgo Puente; Daniel Alejandro Munoz Borrego; Gabriel Blizman; José Carlos Garcia; Jorge Gomez; John Shullman	IAmChino; Gomez; Johnnyboy; G.Bliz	3:35
2.	"No Lo Trates" (with Daddy Yankee and Natti Natasha)	Pérez; Ramón Ayala; Natalia Gutiérrez; Al Burna; Garcia; El General; Gomez; Bilal Hajji; Rafael Pina Nieves; Jimmy Thörnfeldt	IAmChino; Gomez; Jimmy Joker	3:18
3.	"3 to Tango"	Pérez; Johan Carlsson; Garcia; Jorge Gomez; Ross Golan; Andreas Carlsson	J. Carlsson	3:42
4.	"Moviéndolo" (featuring Wisin & Yandel)	Pérez; Llandel Veguilla; Juan Luis Morera Luna; Manuel Corao; Yoel Luis Henriquez Emmanuelli; Garcia; Gomez; Thörnfeldt	IAmChino; Gomez; Jimmy Joker	2:51
5.	"Happy Mama Day" (featuring Chacal and Sky Monroe)	Pérez; Ramon Lavado Martinez; Cynthia Pareja; Leonardo Brooks; Garcia; Gomez; Thörnfeldt	IAmChino; Gomez; Jimmy Joker; Leo Brooks	2:56
6.	"Get Ready" (featuring Blake Shelton)	Pérez; Blake Shelton; Garcia; Xenia Ghali; Gomez; Huddie Ledbetter; Thörnfeldt; Fernando Zulueta	IAmChino; Gomez; Jimmy Joker; Ghali	3:34
7.	"Cinco de Mayo" (with Lil Jon featuring Chesca)	Pérez; Francesca Ramirez; Jonathan Smith; Garcia; Gomez; Hajji; Ricky Luna; Elvin Milan; Thörnfeldt	IAmChino; Gomez; Jimmy Joker; Luna	3:47
8.	"Mala" (with Becky G)	Pérez; Rebbeca Marie Gomez; Burna; Moses Davis; Fuego; Garcia; Gomez; Hajji; Steven Michael Marsden; Dean Mundy; Andrew O'Neil Thomas; Thörnfeldt	IAmChino; Gomez; Jimmy Joker	2:53
9.	"Mueve La Cintura" (with Tito El Bambino and Guru Randhawa)	Corao; Garcia; Gomez; Efrain Fines Nevares; Pérez; Guru Randhawa; Thörnfeldt	IAmChino; Gomez; Jimmy Joker	3:13
10.	"Me Quedaré Contigo" (with Ne-Yo featuring Lenier and El Micha)	Eliosbel Galarraga "Brujo"; Yosdany Jacob Carmenates; Garcia; Gomez; Albaro Lennier Mesa; Michel Fernando Sierra Miranda; Yarek Orsini; Pérez; Shaffer Smith; Thörnfeldt	IAmChino; Gomez; Jimmy Joker	3:46
11.	"Se La Vi" (featuring IAmChino and Papayo)	Garcia; Gomez; Pérez; Thörnfeldt	IAmChino; Gomez; Jimmy Joker	3:55
12.	"Tell Me Again" (featuring Ludacris and Prince Royce)	Blizman; Luther Campbell; Harry Casey; Garcia; Gomez; Juan Lopez; Chris Bridges; Pérez; Jean Rodríguez; Geoffrey Royce Rojas; Shullman; Michael Sterling; Thörnfeldt	IAmChino; Gomez; Jimmy Joker; Johnnyboy; G.Bliz	3:31
13.	"No Se Lleva Nada" (featuring El Micha)	Blizman; Garcia; Gomez; Pérez; Shullman	IAmChino; Gomez; Johnnyboy; G.Bliz	2:55
14.	"Ocupado" (featuring Flo Rida and Yomil y El Dany)	Blizman; Borrego; Corao; Tramar Dillard; Garcia; Gomez; Pérez; Puente; Shullman; Thörnfeldt	IAmChino; Gomez; Johnnyboy; G.Bliz	4:12
15.	"Cantaré" (featuring Lenier)	Brooks; Corao; Garcia; Gomez; Ricky Luna; Mesa; Francesco Migliacci; Domenico Modugno; Pérez; Thörnfeldt	IAmChino; Gomez; Jimmy Joker; Luna	3:05
Total length:				51:25

Notes

- "No Lo Trates" with Daddy Yankee and Natti Natasha interpolates "Rica y Apretadita" by El General featuring Anayca.
- "Happy Mama Day" featuring Chacal and Sky Monroe interpolates "Everybody Everybody" by Blackbox.
- "Get Ready" featuring Blake Shelton interpolates "Black Betty" by Ram Jam.
- "Tell Me Again" featuring Prince Royce and Ludacris interpolates "Lovers and Friends" by Lil Jon and the East Side Boyz featuring Usher and Ludacris.
- "Mala" featuring Becky G interpolates "Roomie" by Beenie Man.
- "Cantaré" featuring Lenier interpolates "Volare" by Domenico Modugno.

== Charts ==
=== Weekly charts ===
Chart (2019)	Peak position
US Latin Rhythm Albums (Billboard)	11
US Top Latin Albums (Billboard)	12

=== Year-end charts ===
Chart (2019)	Position
US Top Latin Albums (Billboard)	79
Chart (2020)	Position
US Top Latin Albums (Billboard)	87

== Certifications ==
Region	Certification	Certified units/sales
United States (RIAA)	2× Platinum (Latin)	120,000^{‡}
^{‡} Sales+streaming figures based on certification alone.

== Release history ==
Date	Format
September 27, 2019	Digital download
December 6, 2019	CD

== See also ==
- 2019 in hip hop music
