= Go Girl (Pitbull song) =

Single by Pitbull featuring Trina and Young Bo$$

from the album The Boatlift
- Released: 2007
- Genre: Hip house; crunk
- Length: 3:48
- Label: TVT
- Songwriters: Armando C. Pérez; David Mauricio Bowen-Petterson; Katrina Laverne Taylor; Kenneth C. Coby; Valentino Khan
- Producer: Soundz

Pitbull singles chronology
"Born-N-Raised" (2006)	"Go Girl" (2007)	"The Anthem" (2007)

Trina singles chronology
"Here We Go" (2005)	"Go Girl" (2007)	"Single Again" (2007)

Young Bo$ singles chronology
"Go Girl" (2007)	"Shooting Star" (2009)

Music video
- "Go Girl" on YouTube

"Go Girl" is a song by Pitbull, released in 2007 as the first single from the album The Boatlift. It features Trina and David Rush, who was at the time known as Young Bo$$. The single peaked at number 83 on the US Billboard Hot 100. A music video was made, featuring Pitbull, Trina and Young Bo$$ dancing in a club.

== Cultural references ==
Pitbull makes several pop culture references in the song. He makes reference to earlier 2007 songs, ones such as "Party Like a Rockstar" by the Shop Boyz and "Buy U a Drank (Shawty Snappin')" by T-Pain featuring Yung Joc. He also makes references to Myspace and the television network HBO.

The song also samples Trina's "Party Like a Rockstar (Remix)" on her 2007 mixtape Rockstarr, as well as lyrics from the Notorious B.I.G.'s 1994 single "Big Poppa".

A sample of the song was played during a dance break during shows of the K-pop SM Town Live '10 World Tour. Hyoyeon, Yoona, Yuri and Sooyoung of Girls' Generation and Luna of f(x) performed a choreographed dance to the song.

== Charts ==
Chart (2007–2008)	Peak position
US Billboard Hot 100	83
US Hot Rap Songs (Billboard)	25
US Pop 100 (Billboard)	64
US Rhythmic Airplay (Billboard)	30
