= The Anthem (Pitbull song) =

2007 single by Pitbull featuring Lil Jon

Single by Pitbull featuring Lil Jon

from the album The Boatlift
- Released: March 4, 2007
- Recorded: 2006–2007
- Genre: Reggae fusion
- Length: 4:05
- Label: TVT
- Songwriters: Armando Pérez; Michael Ochoa-Camp; Carlos Mattos; Rune Kölsch
- Producers: DJ Riddler; Albert Castillo; Lil Jon

Pitbull singles chronology
"Go Girl" (2007)	"The Anthem" (2007)	"Sticky Icky" (2007)

Lil Jon singles chronology
"Gangsta Gangsta" (2007)	"The Anthem" (2007)	"Get Buck in Here" (2007)

Music video
- "The Anthem" on YouTube

"The Anthem" is a song by Pitbull, released as the second single from his 2007 album The Boatlift. It features rapper Lil Jon. The intro line, as well as the song's main hook, is taken from the 1970s Latin hit "El Africano" by Sonora Dinamita. It samples the song "Calabria 2007" by Rune Reilly Kölsch featuring Natasja Saad.

== "Defense" (official remix to "The Anthem") ==
The official remix is entitled "Defense (The Anthem)"; it features Trinidadian soca singer Machel Montano with Pitbull and Lil Jon. The remix appears on Montano's album Flame On (Winning Season is the U.S. edition of the album). This song is notable because its primary beat is played by a synthesized saxophone, which covers a simple minor triad.

== Music video ==
The music video for the song was shot in Trinidad and Tobago, Miami and Atlanta and became a dedication to Natasja Saad.
E-40 made a cameo appearance.

== Charts ==
Chart (2007–2008)	Peak position
Belgium (Ultratip Bubbling Under Flanders)	12
Germany (GfK)	72
Switzerland (Schweizer Hitparade)	64
US Billboard Hot 100	36
US Hot Latin Songs (Billboard)	24
US Hot Rap Songs (Billboard)	8
US Pop 100 (Billboard)	36
US Rhythmic Airplay (Billboard)	10

Chart (2012)	Peak position
France (SNEP)	143
