= DJ Laz =

Cuban-American rapper and DJ from Miami, Florida

DJ laz
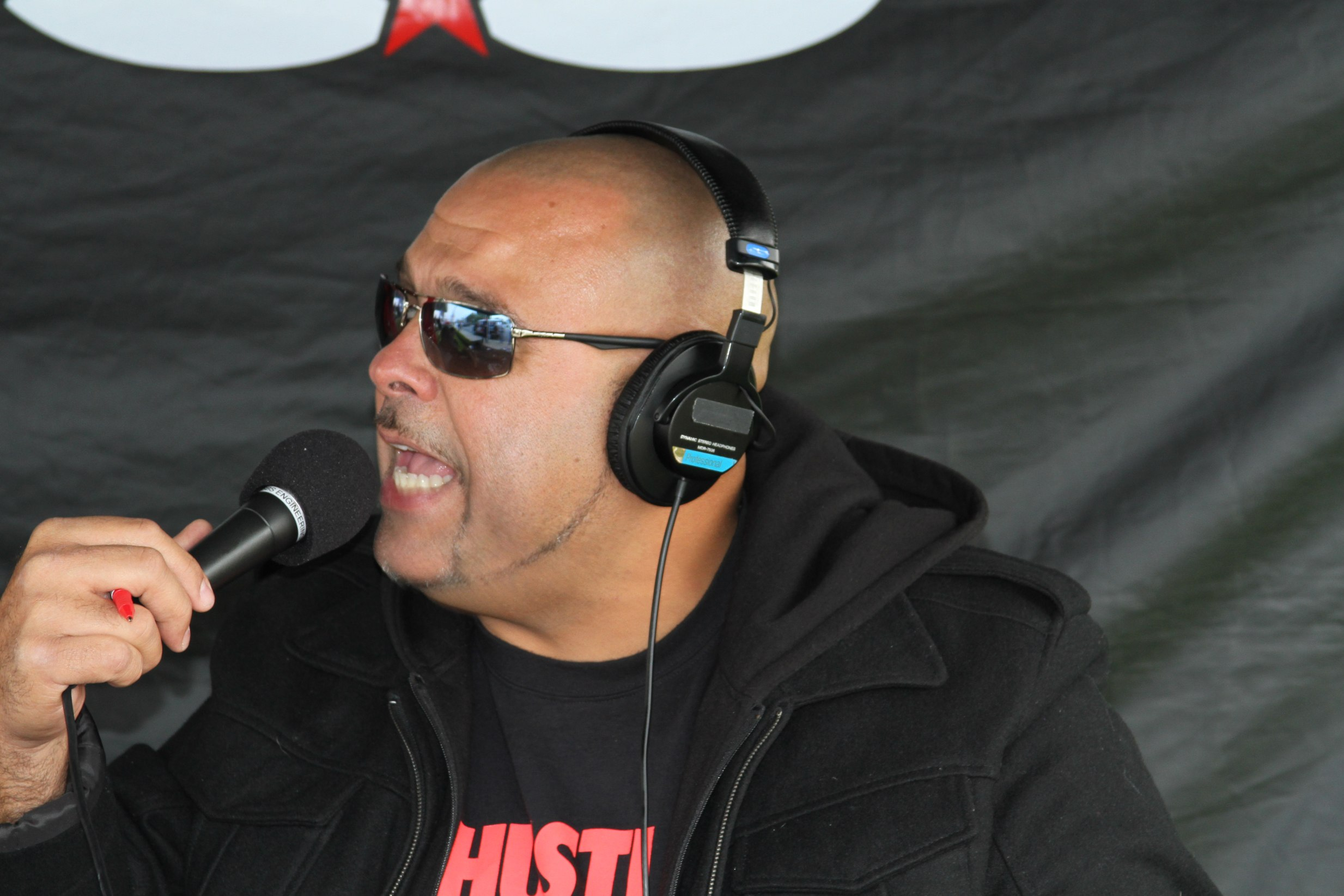

Background information
- Also known as: The Pimp with the Limp
- Born: Lazaro Mendez; December 2, 1971 (age 54)
- Origin: Miami, Florida, U.S.
- Genres: Hip hop; merengue; Miami bass
- Occupations: DJ; rapper
- Years active: 1990–present
- Labels: Pandisc Music Corp.; TVT Records; Collipark Music
- Website: djlaz.com

Lazaro Mendez, better known by his stage name DJ Laz (born December 2, 1971) is an American rapper and DJ. He hosted his weekday radio show in Miami on WPOW 96.5 FM, branded "Power 96", for 22 years until he left the company in April 2012. Beginning July 4, 2012, the new DJ Laz Morning Show began after arbitration on the newly reformatted WRMA DJ106.7 a bilingual dance/rhythmic formatted station.

He is best known for his limp which came from his childhood poliomyelitis. He is also known for albums DJ Laz and Category 6, which charted on U.S. Billboard album charts and the singles "Journey Into Bass" (1994) and "Move Shake Drop" (2008), which peaked at #56 on the Billboard Hot 100.

DJ Laz is also known for his show's prominent appearance on Fox's television show, Dish Nation.

On Tuesday, September 11, 2012, the DJ Laz Morning Show aired a pre-recorded interview with President Barack Obama. Many Obama critics quickly bashed Obama for making no mention to the September 11 attacks in 2001, despite the fact that the interview was pre-recorded. The White House later made it clear that the call was indeed pre-recorded and was supposed to have been played on Monday, September 10.

On May 5, 2014, DJ Laz was in command of a boat that was stuck on a sand bar in Biscayne Bay. When bystanders got out to push the boat, DJ Laz increased power to the engine and killed a 23-year-old man who had been trying to help, as he was caught by the boat's propeller. DJ Laz was never given a sobriety test and there was no further investigation.

DJ Laz hosted the Morning Show for 97.3 in Miami from August, 2014 until November, 2019. He left in advance of an acquisition, and can currently be found on Sirius XM on Pitbull's Globalization Channel 13.

In 2021, DJ Laz joined Miami's new 1990s station Totally 93.9, hosting weekday afternoons.

== Discography ==
Studio albums

Year	Title	Chart positions		
Year	Title	Top R&B/Hip-Hop Albums	Top Rap Albums	Heatseekers Albums
1991	D.J. Laz: Released: November 26, 1991; Label: Pandisc	86	—	—
1993	Journey Into Bass: Released: January 24, 1993; Label: Pandisc	—	—	—
1996	King Of Bass: Released: July 12, 1996; Label: Pandisc	—	—	46
1998	Cruzin': Released: February 24, 1998; Label: Pandisc	—	—	—
2000	Pimpin: Released: January 25, 2000; Label: Pandisc	—	—	—
2008	Category 6: Released: July 29, 2008; Label: VIP Music/Federal Distribution	49	23	18

Instrumental albums

- 1994: Bass XXX
- 1996: Bass XXX, Vol. II
- 2001: XXX Breaks

Compilation albums

- 2001: Greatest Hits
- 2004: The Latin Album

=== Charted singles ===
Title	Year	Peak chart positions				Album
Title	Year	Hot 100	Hot Rap Songs	Rhythmic	Hot Latin Songs	Album
"Journey into Bass"	1994	—	44	—	—	Journey Into Bass
"Move Shake Drop" (featuring Casely & Flo Rida)	2008	56	—	40	49	Category 6
"—" denotes a recording that did not chart or was not released in that territory.

Other singles

- 1991: "Mami El Negro"
- 1992: "Moments in Bass"
- 1992: "Latin Rhythm"
- 1992: "Hump All Night"
- 1995: "Shake It Up"
- 1996: "Esa Morena"
- 1998: "Sabrosura"
- 1998: "Negra Chula"
- 1999: "Get Your Ass Off Stage"
- 2000: "The Red Alert Project"
- 2000: "Ki Ki Ri Bu"
- 2000: "Facina"
- 2008: "She Can Get It"
- 2009: "I Made It to the U.S.A."
- 2010: "Alcoholic" (featuring Pitbull)
- 2011: "You Got Me Going" (featuring Vein)
