= David Rush (rapper) =

American rapper

- Also known as: Rush; Young Bo$$; Ranchid Aziz; PenGod
- Born: David Mauricio Bowen-Petterson; May 20, 1983 (age 42); Highland Park, New Jersey, U.S.
- Genres: Hip-hop
- Occupations: Rapper; singer; songwriter; record producer
- Years active: 2005–present
- Labels: WinsOnlyMusic; Mr. 305 Inc.; Universal Republic
- Website: davidrushonline.com

David Mauricio Bowen-Petterson (born May 20, 1983), better known by his stage name David Rush, is an American rapper. He signed a joint venture recording contract with Pitbull's Mr. 305 Inc. and Universal Republic Records to release his 2008 debut single, "Shooting Star." The song entered the Canadian Hot 100, Pop 100, and Rhythmic charts, and spawned a remix featuring EDM duo LMFAO and Pitbull. The year prior, Rush first guest featured alongside Trina on Pitbull's 2007 single "Go Girl," which entered the Billboard Hot 100. His following releases have failed to chart, and Rush ultimately became a record producer, having produced Jason Derulo's 2014 single "Stupid Love."

== Career ==
In 2007, under the moniker Young Bo$$, Rush scored his first big feature on the song "Go Girl", by fellow American rapper Pitbull, which peaked at No. 83 on the US Billboard Hot 100. Following this, he officially changed his stage name to David Rush and on September 18, 2008, released his debut mixtape, Feel the Rush Vol. 1. The mixtape features his biggest success to date, his commercial debut single, "Shooting Star", which features Pitbull and was produced by AYB. The single charted on the Canadian Hot 100 and also reached the top ten on the US Billboard Rhythmic Top 40 chart. "Shooting Star" was remixed featuring production from LMFAO and vocals from Kevin Rudolf. Rush collaborated with Pitbull again in the making of Pitbull's 2012 album Global Warming, where Rush was featured on a song titled "Everybody Fucks", alongside African-American R&B singer Akon.

== Discography ==
=== Mixtapes ===
- 2008: Feel the Rush Vol. 1
- 2016: The Alive Project
- 2016: GAWD, Get A Win Daily
- 2017: One Day From The Sun

=== Singles ===
Year	Song	US Pop	US Rhyt.	CAN	Album
2008	"Shooting Star (Party Rock Remix)" (featuring Kevin Rudolf, LMFAO and Pitbull)	33	9	66	Feel the Rush Vol. 1
2009	"Where You Wanna Go"	-	-	-	Feel the Rush Vol. 1

==== Featured singles ====
Year	Song	US	US Pop	NOR	Album
2007	"Go Girl" (Pitbull featuring Trina and Young Bo$$)	83	64	-	The Boatlift
2011	"Took My Love" (Pitbull featuring Redfoo, Vein & David Rush)	-	-	-	Planet Pit
2013	"Everybody Fucks" (Pitbull featuring Akon & David Rush)	-	-	19	Global Warming
2013	"All Night" (Pitbull featuring David Rush)	-	-	-	Non-album singles
