= El Mariel =

Studio album by Pitbull
- Released: October 31, 2006
- Recorded: April 2005–April 2006
- Genres: Hip hop; crunk
- Length: 70:55
- Label: TVT
- Producers: Diaz Brothers; Lil Jon; DJ Khaled; Mr. Collipark; Jim Jonsin; The Runners; Pharrell Williams; Gorilla Tek; DJ Rob-N; Taz Arnold

Pitbull chronology
Money Is Still a Major Issue (2005)	El Mariel (2006)	The Boatlift (2007)

Singles from El Mariel
- 1. "Bojangles" Released: May 2, 2006; 2. "Ay Chico (Lengua Afuera)" Released: October 30, 2006; 3. "Dime" Released: October 30, 2006; 4. "Be Quiet" Released: October 31, 2006

El Mariel is the second studio album by Cuban-American rapper Pitbull. It was released on October 31, 2006 through TVT Records. The album was leaked onto the internet on October 27, 2006, four days before the album was released. The album features production from Lil Jon, Diaz Brothers, DJ Khaled, Mr. Collipark, The Neptunes and Jim Jonsin. It also includes guest appearances from Fat Joe, Wyclef Jean, Lil Jon, Rick Ross and Trick Daddy among others. A Spanish-language version of the album was also released on October 31, 2006 featuring the three singles from the album, along with twelve Spanish-only tracks.

El Mariel was supported by four singles: "Bojangles", "Ay Chico (Lengua Afuera)", "Dime" and "Be Quiet". The album received generally mixed reviews from music critics and was a moderate commercial success. It debuted at number 17 on the US Billboard 200 chart, selling 48,000 copies in its first week.

== Critical reception ==
Professional ratings
Review scores
Source	Rating
AllMusic	4/5 stars
HipHopDX	2.5/5 stars
Los Angeles Times	3/4 stars
RapReviews	8.0/10
Rolling Stone	2.5/5 stars
The Situation	4/5
Stylus Magazine	B−
XXL	(L)

AllMusic's David Jeffries noted that the album's political aspects are misleading, but praised it for having catchy party music mixed with the serious tracks and Pitbull for showing a little depth in his lyrical repertoire, concluding that, "While it's hard to deny the more mature Pitbull is something that needs to be explored further, it's just as hard to deny the rump-shaking, trunk-rumbling stunners he drops all over the album." Steve 'Flash' Juon of RapReviews praised the album's reggaeton sound and Pitbull's improvement as a lyricist and musician, concluding that, "Hip-Hop in South Florida is now more universal than ever thanks in large part to Pitbull's infectious flow and machismo." Agustin Gurza of the Los Angeles Times praised the record for conveying an artist that carries multiple dimensions and facets of a lived life, saying "we meet a Pitbull who is even likable and vulnerable."

Jesús Triviño Alarcon of XXL, while praising the tracks that involved serious topics, felt the record was overhauled by a majority of the nondescript dance club tracks, concluding that "[T]he music may knock in the club, but Pitbull’s lack of diversity is a major issue." Evan Serpick of Rolling Stone was critical of Pitbull's flow throughout the album, saying that it works in the party tracks but the slower ones bring out lyricism that's limp, concluding that "his hot flow and ice-cold lyrics are better served in the club." Andres Tardio of HipHopDX said he saw potential based on the record's title and its serious tracks but felt it was wasted opportunity because of Pitbull not being able to stay on topic.

== Commercial performance ==
El Mariel debuted at number 17 on the US Billboard 200 chart, selling 48,000 copies in its first week. The album also debuted at number one on the US Top Independent Albums chart, becoming Pitbull's second number one on the chart. As of April 2007, the album has sold over a total of 214,000 copies in the United States.

== Track listing ==
El Mariel track listing
No.	Title	Writer(s)	Producer(s)	Length
1.	"Intro"		Donavan Knowles	1:56
2.	"Miami Shit"	Armando Perez; Tony Castillo; Brandon Hollemon	Gorilla Tek	3:22
3.	"Come See Me"	Perez; Willie Colón; Hector Lavoe; Aldrin Davis	DJ Toomp	3:07
4.	"Jealouso"	Pharrell Williams; Perez	Pharrell Williams	4:03
5.	"Qué Tú Sabes D'eso" (featuring Fat Joe and Sinful)	Perez; Joseph Cartagena; Rodrigo Navarra; Alex Francis; Jason Arthur Farmer; Clifford Harris; Gabriel Arillo; Davis; Donny Hathaway; Leroy Hutson; Curtis Mayfield; Billy Roberts	The Ghost Writers	4:03
6.	"Fademaster Skit"			0:37
7.	"Be Quiet"	Perez; Mario Antonio Gonzalez	Shakespeare	3:22
8.	"Ay Chico (Lengua Afuera)"	Perez; Michael Crooms; Agustín Ribot; Hansel Martinez; Raúl Alfonso	Mr. Collipark	3:25
9.	"Fuego"	Perez; Crooms; Tony Butler	Mr. Collipark; Tom Slick (co.)	3:49
10.	"Rock Bottom" (featuring Bun B and Cubo)	Perez; Ernst Dimanche; Frank Roman; Bernard Freeman	Taz	4:31
11.	"Amanda Diva Skit"			0:41
12.	"Blood Is Thicker Than Water" (featuring Redd Eyezz)	Perez; Michael Cipriano; James Pierre	Cip	4:05
13.	"Jungle Fever" (featuring Wyclef Jean and Oobie)	Perez; Wyclef Jean; Robin Garcia; Javier Gamboa	DJ Rob-N; Gamboa	4:02
14.	"Hey You Girl"	Perez; Jim Jonsin; Frederick Schneider; Ricky Wilson; Luther Campbell; David Hobbs; Mark Ross; Christopher Wong Won	Jim Jonsin	3:46
15.	"Raindrops" (featuring Anjuli Stars)	Luis Diaz; Hugo Diaz; Perez; Anjuli Stars	The Diaz Brothers	4:15
16.	"Voodoo"	Perez; Jonathan Smith; Craig Love; LaMarquis Jefferson	Lil Jon	3:47
17.	"Descarada (Dance)" (featuring Vybz Kartel)	Perez; Donavan Bennett; Adidja Palmer	Don "Vendetta" Bennett	3:02
18.	"Dime (Remix)" (featuring Ken-Y)	Perez; Smith; Kenny Vázquez	Lil Jon	5:07
19.	"Bojangles (Remix)" (featuring Lil Jon and Ying Yang Twins)	Perez; Smith; Eric Jackson; Deongelo Holmes	Lil Jon	4:29
20.	"Born-N-Raised" (DJ Khaled featuring Pitbull, Trick Daddy, and Rick Ross)	Andrew Harr; Jermaine Jackson; Johnny Mollings; Lenny Mollings; Perez	The Runners	4:16
21.	"Outro"			1:10
Total length:				70:55

iTunes bonus track
No.	Title	Producer(s)	Length
22.	"We Run This"	Ervin EP Pope	3:29

Best Buy Bonus DVD

1. The Making of El Mariel (directed by Bobby Viera)
2. "Bojangles" (remix) video
3. "Bojangles" live performance Video (directed by Bobby Viera)
4. La Esquina: Trading Races

Sample credits

- "Come See Me" contains a sample of "La Murga de Panama", written and performed by Willie Colón and Hector Lavoe.
- "Qué Tú Sabes D'eso" contains an interpolation of "What You Know", written by Clifford Harris, Gabriel Arillo, Aldrin Davis, Donny Hathaway, Leroy Hutson, Curtis Mayfield, and Billy Roberts.
- "Ay Chico (Lengua Afuera)" contains an interpolation of "Todo el Mundo Con la Lengua Afuera", written by Agustín Ribot, Hansel Martinez, and Raúl Alfonso.
- "Fuego" contains an interpolation of "When I Hear Music", written by Tony Butler.
- "Hey You Girl" contains:
  - a sample of "Rock Lobster", written by Frederick Schneider and Ricky Wilson; performed by the B-52's.
  - an interpolation of "One and One', written by Luther Campbell, David Hobbs, Mark Ross, and Christopher Wong Won.

== Charts ==
=== Weekly charts ===
Weekly chart performance for El Mariel
Chart (2006)	Peak position
US Billboard 200	17
US Independent Albums (Billboard)	1
US Top R&B/Hip-Hop Albums (Billboard)	5
US Top Rap Albums (Billboard)	2

=== Year-end charts ===
Year-end chart performance for El Mariel
Chart (2007)	Position
US Independent Albums (Billboard)	26
