= Ay Chico (Lengua Afuera) =

Single by Pitbull

from the album El Mariel
- Released: October 30, 2006
- Recorded: 2006
- Genre: Latin hip hop
- Length: 3:25
- Label: TVT
- Songwriter(s): Raúl Alfonso; Hansel Martinez; Agustín Ribont; Michael Croomsl; Armando Pérez
- Producer(s): Mr. Collipark

Pitbull singles chronology
"Bojangles" (2006)	"Ay Chico (Lengua Afuera)" (2006)	"Dime" (2006)

Music video
- "Ay Chico (Lengua Afuera)" on YouTube

"Ay Chico (Lengua Afuera)" (English: "Hey Boy (Tongue Out)") is the second single from the album El Mariel by American artist Pitbull. The single was produced by Mr. Collipark. It peaked at number 92 on the US Billboard Hot 100.

== Charts ==
Chart (2006–2007)	Peak position
US Billboard Hot 100	92
US Hot R&B/Hip-Hop Songs (Billboard)	99
US Hot Rap Songs (Billboard)	19
US Rhythmic (Billboard)	19
