= Secret Admirer (song) =

Single by Pitbull featuring Lloyd

from the album The Boatlift
- Released: November 27, 2007
- Recorded: 2006–07
- Genre: Hip house; crunk
- Length: 3:18
- Label: TVT; Bad Boy Latino
- Songwriter(s): Armando C. Pérez; Carlton Mahone Jr.; Juan Salinas; Oscar Salinas; Rodney Terry
- Producer(s): Play-N-Skillz

Pitbull singles chronology
"Crazy" (2007)	"Secret Admirer" (2007)	"Move Shake Drop" (2008)

Lloyd singles chronology
"Player's Prayer" (2007)	"Secret Admirer" (2007)	"How We Do It (Around My Way)" (2008)

Music video
- "Secret Admirer" on YouTube

"Secret Admirer" is a song by American rapper Pitbull featuring Lloyd. It was released on November 27, 2007, as single from Pitbull's third studio album The Boatlift. It has a riff to My Boo. The song was written by Pitbull, Oscar Salinas, Carl Mahone, Juan Salinas and David Terry and it was produced by Play-N-Skillz.

== Music video ==
This video was directed by David Rousseau. It features both Pitbull and Lloyd.

== Track listing ==
1. "Secret Admirer" (Album Version) – 3:18
2. "Secret Admirer" (Radio Edit) – 3:17

== Charts ==
Chart (2007–2008)	Peak position
New Zealand (Recorded Music NZ)	30
US Rhythmic (Billboard)	28

== Release history ==
Region	Date	Format	Label
United States	November 27, 2007	Digital Download	TVT, Bad Boy Latino
