= Bojangles (song) =

Single by Pitbull

from the album El Mariel
- Released: May 2006
- Genre: Crunk
- Length: 3:46 (single version); 4:29 (remix featuring Lil Jon and the Ying Yang Twins)
- Label: TVT
- Songwriters: De'Onjelo Homles; Erick Jackson; Armando Pérez; Jonathan Smith
- Producer: Lil Jon

Pitbull singles chronology
"Everybody Get Up" (2005)	"Bojangles" (2006)	"Ay Chico (Lengua Afuera)" (2006)

Music video
- "Bojangles (Remix)" on YouTube

"Bojangles" is a song by American rapper Pitbull. It was released in May 2006 as the lead single from his album El Mariel. It was produced by Lil Jon. The remix features Lil Jon and the Ying Yang Twins. It featured a controversial video featuring the featured artists. In 2011, a remix was released featuring DJ Lady Tribe.

== Content ==
The song references a line by one of the Ying Yang Twins, "a Bojangles is a girl with breast, legs and wings", in turn taking the name from the fast food chain Bojangles' Famous Chicken 'n Biscuits. Pitbull also references Jay-Z's 1996 album Reasonable Doubt in the song.

== Track listing ==
Triple Pack

1. "Bojangles"
2. "Shake" Ying Yang Twins feat. Pitbull & Elephant Man
3. "Culo" feat. Lil Jon & Ivy Queen

== Charts ==
Chart (2006)	Peak position
US Billboard Hot 100	91
US Hot R&B/Hip-Hop Songs (Billboard)	89
US Pop 100 (Billboard)	80
US Rhythmic Airplay (Billboard)	28
