= Dime (Pitbull song) =

Single by Pitbull featuring Ken-Y

from the album El Mariel
- Released: October 30, 2006
- Recorded: 2006
- Genre: Latin hip hop; R&B
- Length: 5:07
- Label: TVT
- Songwriters: Armando Pérez; Jonathan Smith; Francisco Javier Bautista, Jr.; Kenny Rúben Vázquez Félix
- Producer: Lil Jon

Pitbull singles chronology
"Ay Chico (Lengua Afuera)" (2006)	"Dime" (2006)	"Be Quiet" (2006)

R.K.M & Ken-Y singles chronology
"Dame Lo Que Quiero" (2006)	"Dime" (2006)	"Mis Días Sin Ti" (2007)

"Dime" is the third single from Cuban American rap artist Pitbull's album El Mariel. It is also labeled as "Tell Me" (Dime, translated in English). The album version features Ken-Y as the singer on the hook, while the radio edit has been redone with Frankie J. The original version of this song is by Ken-Y and is featured on his debut album as a part of the reggaeton duo R.K.M & Ken-Y: Masterpiece.

== Charts ==
=== Weekly charts ===
Chart (2006–2007)	Peak position
US Bubbling Under Hot 100 (Billboard)	16
US Hot Latin Songs (Billboard)	4
US Rhythmic Airplay (Billboard)	29

=== Year-end charts ===
Chart (2007)	Position
US Hot Latin Songs (Billboard)	39

== See also ==
- List of Billboard Latin Rhythm Airplay number ones of 2006
- List of Billboard Latin Rhythm Airplay number ones of 2007
