= Casely =

American singer (born 1985)

- Born: Jean-Carlos Casely; 30 November 1985 (age 40)
- Origin: Miami, Florida, U.S.
- Genres: R&B; hip hop; Miami bass
- Instruments: Vocals; guitar; piano; producer
- Years active: 2005–present
- Labels: Independent; Tuff Gong
- Website: https://www.casely21.com/

Casely (born Jean-Carlos Casely 30 November 1985) is an American (son of Trinidadian and Panamanian parents) singer from Miami, Florida. In 2005, he released his debut album I'll Be on the 1st Records label. The album caught the attention of the Diaz Brothers, who signed him to their own division of Epic Records in 2007. His second album, 1985, was in development in 2008 but never released; its lead-off single, "Emotional" (written/produced by Casely), was released in February 2008 and entered the Billboard Hot R&B/Hip-Hop Songs charts. He signed to Ultra Records in 2011–2012 with the release of his single "Neva Fall". In 2014, Casely and his band, Casely and the Jank, released their EP "Brick: the Collection 2014". In 2020, Casely released a series of singles, including "Nena" with Red Rat, "Hillbilly Drip", "1985" with D*L*P*, "Touch Me", "Time Flies", "George", and his recent double "Never Be Alone/Rude Boy Summer" with Braveboy.

== Discography ==
=== Albums ===
2005: I'll Be (debut album)
2008: 1985 (major label – unreleased)
2014: Brick: The Collection 2014 – Casely and the Jank (debut EP)

=== Solo singles ===
Year	Title	Chart positions		Album
Year	Title	U.S. R&B	U.S. Rap	Album
2008	"Emotional"	63	63	1985
2011	"Sweat" (featuring Lil Jon & Machel Montano)	—	—	1985
2011	"Neva Fall"	—	—	1985
2011	"Do What You Want"	—	—	
2011	"Good Time"	—	—	Good Time Christmas
2011	"O Holy Night"	—	—	Good Time Christmas
2011	"Last Christmas"	—	—	Good Time Christmas
2020	"Nena" (with Red Rat)	—	—	
2020	"Hillbilly Drip"	—	—	
2020	"1985" (with D*L*P*)	—	—	1985/Touch Me
2020	"Touch Me"	—	—	1985/Touch Me
2020	"Time Flies"	—	—	
2020	"George"	—	—	
2020	"Never Be Alone"	—	—	Never Be Alone/Rude Boy Summer
2020	"Rude Boy Summer" (with Braveboy)	—	—	Never Be Alone/Rude Boy Summer

== Featured songs ==
- Na Na (Baby Bash featuring Casely)
- Midnight (Pitbull featuring Casely)
- Defend Dade (DJ Khaled featuring Pitbull & Casely)
- Move, Shake, Drop (DJ Laz featuring Flo Rida, Casely & Pitbull)
- Emotional (Remix) (DJ Static & Casely featuring Pitbull & Flo Rida)
- Messy (B.Noza featuring Pitbull, Red Rat & Casely)
- Pump That Like This (J-Cool featuring Casely)
