= Course of Empire =

Course of Empire may refer to:

== Art ==
- The Course of Empire (paintings), a series of paintings created by Thomas Cole from 1833 to 1836
- The Course of Empire, an art exhibit by Edward Ruscha

== Literature ==
- The Course of Empire (history book), a 1952 American history book by Bernard DeVoto
- Course of Empire (novel), a 2003 science-fiction novel by Eric Flint and K.D. Wentworth
- The Course of Empire: The Arabs and Their Successors, a 1966 book by John Bagot Glubb

== Music ==
- Course of Empire (band), an American alternative/post-punk band
  - Course of Empire (album)
- The Course of Empire, a 2019 album by Atlantean Kodex

== See also ==
- Westward the Course of Empire Takes Its Way, an 1861 mural by Emanuel Leutze in the United States Capitol Building
