= 20 Fingers (album) =

Studio album by 20 Fingers
- Released: October 24, 1995
- Recorded: 1994–1995
- Genre: Pop, dance, hip hop
- Label: Zoo Entertainment/SOS Records
- Producer: Charlie Babie, Manny Mohr, J.J. Flores, Onofrio Lollino

20 Fingers chronology
| On the Attack and More (1995) | 20 Fingers (1995) |

Singles from 20 Fingers
- 1. "Sex Machine" Released: 1995; 2. "Holding on to Love" Released: 1995; 3. "Position #9" Released: 1995

Singles from L'Album
- 1. "She Won't Know" Released: 1995; 2. "I'm in Love" Released: 1995; 3. "Praying for an Angel" Released: 1995

Professional ratings
Review scores
| Source | Rating |
|---|---|
| AllMusic | 3/5 stars |

20 Fingers is the self-titled second and final studio album of American music group 20 Fingers. It has been released on October 24, 1995, under Zoo Entertainment/SOS Records, six months after the release of their debut album On the Attack and More.

== Background ==
In 1995, the group released their self-titled second studio album, called "20 Fingers" worldwide. The album has unlike the first studio album, where only two vocalists, Gillette on eleven tracks and Roula on one track, the peculiarity of featuring different vocalists for almost every song. In France, the album was released under the name L'album with an altered cover art and track list. Their first single, fifth overall, "Sex Machine" featuring Katrina (Roxanne Dawn) was released in 1995, which was another club hit but did not sell as well as its predecessors. It was the only single released of this album credited as "20 Fingers featuring Katrina", while further single releases were only credited under the name of the featured vocalist, such as Nerada's "Position #9", Dania's "She Won't Know", Rochelle's "Praying for an Angel" and "Holding on to Love" or A' Lisa B's "I'm in Love" with the addition "A 20 Fingers Production". Next to all new original material, some versions of this album also consist of three previously released 20 Fingers singles "Short Dick Man" and "Lick It", the remix of "Mr. Personality" called "Ugly" and the two previously released Max-A-Million singles "Take Your Time" and "Fat Boy" produced by 20 Fingers. In Fact that all previous 20 Fingers singles, in original or remixed form, are included on these album versions, they have been considered a compilation album and released under the title "The Best of 20 Fingers" in Asia.

== Track listing ==
=== 20 Fingers ===
1. "Sex Machine" (featuring Katrina) – 4:03
2. "Choke My Chicken" (featuring Ted Tubbacki & Booger) – 3:34
3. "Little Melody (That Damn Song)" (featuring Bongo Boys) – 3:57
4. "100% Woman" (featuring Vicki R.) – 4:09
5. "Cave Man" (featuring Bongo Boys) – 3:31
6. "Holding on to Love" (featuring Rochelle) – 3:59
7. "Position #9" (featuring Nerada) – 4:32
8. "Popsicle Love" (featuring Cassandra) – 4:01
9. "Electric Slide" (featuring Dance Factor) – 3:43
10. "Bring It on Bac" (featuring Bongo Boys) – 5:36
11. "The Raw" (featuring Bongo Boys) – 5:40

=== L'Album ===
See notes for further information. (Note: "L'Album" includes the bonus tracks "Round We Go" and "Putang Ina Mo", the previously released singles "Short Dick Man", "Lick It" and "Mr. Personality" (in remixed form), and the singles "She Won't Know", "I'm in Love" and "Praying for an Angel".)

1. "Sex Machine" (featuring Katrina) – 4:03
2. "Round We Go" (featuring Big Sister) – 3:59
3. "Electric Slide" (featuring Dance Factor) – 3:43
4. "She Won't Know" (featuring Dania) – 5:36
5. "100% Woman" (featuring Vicki R.) – 4:09
6. "Short Dick Man" (featuring Gillette) – 3:16
7. "Holding on to Love" (featuring Rochelle) – 3:59
8. "Position #9" (featuring Nerada) – 4:32
9. "Mr. Personality (Ugly Mix)" (featuring Gillette) – 4:04
10. "Lick It" (featuring Roula) – 3:34
11. "Popsicle Love" (featuring Cassandra) – 4:01
12. "Putang Ina Mo" – 4:11
13. "I'm in Love" (featuring A'lisa B)
14. "Praying for an Angel" (featuring Rochelle)

=== 20 Fingers compilation ===
See notes for further information. (Note: "20 Fingers Compilation" includes the bonus track "Work That Love", the previously released singles "Short Dick Man", "Lick It" and "Mr. Personality" (in remixed form), and two 20 Fingers-produced Max-A-Million singles, "Take Your Time" and "Fatboy".)

1. "Sex Machine" (featuring Katrina) – 4:03
2. "Round We Go" (featuring Big Sister) – 3:59
3. "Cave Man" (featuring Bongo Boys) – 3:31
4. "Electric Slide" (featuring Dance Factor) – 3:43
5. "Bring It on Bac" (featuring Bongo Boys) – 5:36
6. "Choke My Chicken" (featuring Ted Tubbacki & Booger) – 3:34
7. "100% Woman" (featuring Vicki R.) – 4:09
8. "The Raw" (featuring Bongo Boys) – 5:40
9. "Short Dick Man" (featuring Gillette) – 3:16
10. "Holding on to Love" (featuring Rochelle) – 3:59
11. "Position #9" (featuring Nerada) – 4:32
12. "Mr. Personality (Ugly Mix)" (featuring Gillette) – 4:04
13. "Lick It" (featuring Roula) – 3:34
14. "Take Your Time" (featuring Max-A-Million) – 3:40
15. "Work That Love" (featuring Jr. Flex) – 3:32
16. "Popsicle Love" (featuring Cassandra) – 4:01
17. "Fat Boy" (featuring Max-A-Million) – 3:34
18. "Putang Ina Mo" – 4:11
19. "Little Melody (That Damn Song)" (featuring Bongo Boys) – 3:57
