= Lick It =

Single by 20 Fingers featuring Roula

from the album On the Attack and More
- Released: February 13, 1995
- Recorded: 1995
- Genre: House; dance-pop
- Length: 3:35
- Label: ZYX; Zoo Entertainment; SOS
- Songwriters: Charlie Babie; Manny Mohr
- Producers: Charlie Babie; Manny Mohr

20 Fingers singles chronology
"Short Dick Man" (1994)	"Lick It" (1995)	"Mr. Personality" (1995)

Music video
- "Lick It" on YouTube

"Lick It" is a song recorded by American dance music group 20 Fingers featuring singer Roula, released in February 1995 by ZYX, Zoo Entertainment and SOS Records as the second single from their debut album, On the Attack and More (1994). It also appears on 20 Fingers' self-titled second studio album and peaked at number-one in Italy. The song contains explicit lyrics that refer to cunnilingus. Its black-and-white music video was directed by Jason A. Harmon and was A-listed on German music television channel VIVA in June 1995. In 2024, Time Out ranked "Lick It" number 13 in their list of "26 Best Oral Sex Songs Ever Made".

== Critical reception ==
Larry Flick from Billboard magazine wrote that a song like this "has lyrics that do not venture beyond adolescent humor and raunchy chatter, with slammin' grooves and contagious melodies serving as the real attention grabber". He added that it "has singer Roula cooing and giggling on the joys of oral gratification." James Hamilton from Music Week's RM Dance Update described it as a "deadpan girl chanted 'Short Dick Man' follow-up's jauntily throbbed 127bpm" track.

== Chart performance ==
The song achieved success in many European countries as well as in Canada. It topped the Italian singles chart and was a top-10 hit in five countries; Austria (10), Belgium (9), France (5), Germany (4) and Spain (4). On the Eurochart Hot 100, "Lick It" reached number six. On the US Billboard Hot 100 and Cash Box Top 100, the song peaked at numbers 72 and 83, respectively. In Canada, it went to number two on both The Record Retail Singles chart and the RPM Dance/Urban chart. In West Asia, it became a top-30 hit in Israel, peaking at number 25 on 14 February 1995. However, its sales were lower than 20 Fingers' previous hit "Short Dick Man". The success of "Short Dick Man" and "Lick It" earned 20 Fingers an award at the 1996 Dance d'Or Awards in France.

== Track listings ==
- CD maxi
1. "Lick It" (20 Fingers radio mix) – 3:34
2. "Lick It" (20 Fingers club mix) – 4:25
3. "Lick It" (a cappella) – 3:20
4. "Lick It" (J.J. 'S underground mix) – 5:14
5. "Lick It" (Onofrio club mix) – 6:34
6. "Lick It" (J.J. 'S bass radio mix) – 3:41
- CD maxi
1. "Lick It" (20 Fingers radio mix) – 3:34
2. "Lick It" (sanitized mix) – 3:34
3. "Lick It" (20 Fingers club mix) – 4:25
4. "Lick It" (J.J.'s underwear mix) – 5:14
5. "Lick It" (Onofrio club mix) – 6:34
6. "Lick It" (a cappella) – 3:20
7. "Lick It" (J.J. bass mix) – 3:34
- 12" maxi
1. "Lick It" (20 Fingers radio mix) – 3:34
2. "Lick It" (20 Fingers club mix) – 4:25
3. "Lick It" (a cappella) – 3:20
4. "Lick It" (J.J. 'S underground mix) – 5:14
5. "Lick It" (Onofrio club mix) – 6:34
6. "Lick It" (J.J. 'S bass radio mix) – 3:41
- 12" maxi
1. "Lick It" (J.J. brothers remix) – 4:21
2. "Lick It" (alternative remix) – 4:19
3. "Lick It" (20 Fingers club mix) – 4:25
4. "Lick It" (J.J.'s bass radio mix) – 3:34
- CD maxi - Remixes
1. "Lick It" (Evolution team radio edit) – 3:58
2. "Lick It" (Evolution team house mix) – 6:21
3. "Lick It" (Evolution team faster mix) – 5:47
4. "Lick It" (J.J. brothers remix) – 4:27
5. "Lick It" (Kamasutra remix) – 6:14
- 12" maxi – Remixes
1. "Lick It" (J.J. brothers remix) – 4:21
2. "Lick It" (alternative remix) – 4:19
3. "Lick It" (Kamasutra remix) – 6:15

== Charts ==
=== Weekly charts ===
Chart (1995)	Peak position
Australia (ARIA)	65
Austria (Ö3 Austria Top 40)	10
Belgium (Ultratop 50 Flanders)	14
Belgium (Ultratop 50 Wallonia)	9
Canada Retail Singles (The Record)	2
Canada Dance/Urban (RPM)	2
El Salvador (UPI)	5
Europe (Eurochart Hot 100)	6
Europe (European Dance Radio)	2
France (SNEP)	5
Germany (GfK)	4
Iceland (Íslenski Listinn Topp 40)	22
Israel (Israeli Singles Chart)	25
Italy (Musica e dischi)	1
Mexico (Notitas Musicales)	1
Netherlands (Dutch Top 40)	21
Netherlands (Single Top 100)	20
New Zealand (Recorded Music NZ)	38
Scotland (OCC)	35
Spain (AFYVE)	4
Switzerland (Schweizer Hitparade)	21
UK Singles (OCC)	48
UK Club Chart (Music Week)	26
UK Pop Tip Club Chart (Music Week)	22
US Billboard Hot 100	72
US Dance Club Play (Billboard)	24
US Maxi-Singles Sales (Billboard)	23
US Cash Box Top 100	83

=== Year-end charts ===
Chart (1995)	Position
Belgium (Ultratop 50 Wallonia)	58
Canada Dance/Urban (RPM)	19
Europe (Eurochart Hot 100)	48
France (SNEP)	49
Germany (Media Control)	46
Netherlands (Dutch Top 40)	199

== Certifications ==
Region	Certification	Certified units/sales
Germany (BVMI)	Gold	250,000^{^}
^{^} Shipments figures based on certification alone.

== Sampling ==
In 1995, the mashup "Don't Laugh But Lick It" was released as 20 Fingers & Winx featuring Roula, compromising "Lick It" with "Don't Laugh" by DJ Winx. In 2009, DJ Felli Fel heavily sampled "Lick It" in his song "Feel It" featuring T-Pain, Sean Paul, Flo Rida and Pitbull.

== Credits ==
- Written by Charlie Babie and Manny Mohr
- Produced by 20 Fingers
- Vocals by Roula
- Published by Tango Rose Music (ASCAP)
- Licensed from SOS Records
- J.J. 'S underground mix and J.J. 'S bass radio mix: remixed by JJ Flores
- Onofrio club mix: remixed by Onofrio Lollino
- J.J. brothers remix: remixed by J.J. Brothers
- Alternative remix: remixed by Piano, Trivellato, Sacchetto and J.J. Brothers
- Evolution team radio edit, Evolution team house mix and Evolution team faster mix: remixed by Evolution
- Kamasutra remix: remixed by Kamasutra
