= Another Minute (disambiguation) =

"Another Minute" is a 1992 song by Cause and Effect.

Another Minute may also refer to:

- Another Minute, a 1992 album by Cause and Effect
- Another Minute, a 2012 album by Sahaj
