= Happy Ending (Dogstar album) =

Studio album by Dogstar
- Released: July 7, 2000
- Genre: Alternative rock, grunge
- Length: 38:51
- Label: Ultimatum Music
- Producer: Michael Vail Blum, Richie Zito

Dogstar chronology
Our Little Visionary (1996)	Happy Ending (2000)	Somewhere Between the Power Lines and Palm Trees (2023)

Professional ratings
Review scores
Source	Rating
AllMusic	2.5/5 stars

Happy Ending is the second album by rock trio Dogstar. It was recorded at Titan Recorders in Sherman Oaks, Los Angeles.

== Track listing ==
1. "Halo" – 2:53
2. "Slipping Down" – 3:03
3. "Enemies" – 3:11
4. "Superstar" – 4:22 (Delaney & Bonnie)
5. "Cornerstore" – 4:15
6. "A Dreamtime" – 3:21
7. "Stagger" – 3:48
8. "Washington" – 4:11
9. "Alarming" – 3:51
10. "Swim" – 2:14
11. "Blown Away" – 4:12

== Personnel ==
Dogstar

- Bret Domrose – vocals, guitar
- Keanu Reeves – bass, backing vocals
- Robert Mailhouse – drums, percussion, backing vocals

with:

- Richie Kotzen, Michael Nightingale – backing vocals

Technical

- Richie Zito – producer on tracks 4, 5, 11, mixer on all tracks except 4 and 5
- Michael Vail Blum – producer on all other tracks
- Brian Reeves – mixer
