= Short Dick Man =

1994 single by 20 Fingers

- US release under the original title

Single by 20 Fingers featuring Gillette

from the album On the Attack and More and 20 Fingers
- Released: August 31, 1994
- Genre: House; novelty
- Length: 4:49; 3:21 (clean version)
- Label: Zoo Entertainment; SOS; Unidisc Music Incorporated
- Songwriters: Charlie Babie; Manny Mohr
- Producer: Charlie Babie

20 Fingers singles chronology
"Short Dick Man" (1994)	"Lick It" (1995)

Music video
- "Short Dick Man (Radio Mix)" on YouTube

Gillette singles chronology
"Short Dick Man" (1994)	"Mr. Personality" (1995)

Alternative cover
- US release under the censored title "Short Short Man"

"Short Dick Man" (also known as "Short, Short Man") is a song by American hip house group 20 Fingers featuring rapper Gillette. It was released in August 1994 on Zoo Entertainment and SOS Records as their debut single from their album, On the Attack and More (1994). The song also appears on 20 Fingers' second self-titled studio album and on Gillette's debut solo album, On the Attack (1994). It was written by Charlie Babie and Manny Mohr and produced by Babie.

"Short Dick Man" was a global success, particularly in El Salvador, France, Italy, and Mexico, where it reached number one. It additionally entered the top 10 in eight other countries and peaked at number 14 on the US Billboard Hot 100 chart. Its music video was directed by Daniel Zirilli. The success of "Short Dick Man" earned 20 Fingers an award at the 1996 Dance d'Or Awards in France.

== Background and release ==
This single, which involves women mocking the size of a man's penis, was also released in a censored version replacing the word "dick" with "short", along with rearranged lyrics (this version was also released under the censored title "Short Short Man"). Co-writer Manfred Mohr told the Los Angeles Times that the point of the song was to attract attention. "We figured there were all these songs by men bashing women and treating women like sex objects. So we decided a song that turned the tables on men might attract some attention." According to the vocalist Sandra Gillette, the point of the song is to "strike back at all the women-bashing songs in pop, especially in rap."

Some radio stations refused to play the song as it was deemed controversial. It received a daytime ban on London's Kiss FM, which was a setback for the song, which was tipped as a contender for the Christmas number one in the UK. Head of programming on Kiss FM, Lorna Clarke, told, "We've had people ringing up and writing in to us saying they disapprove of the record. We're so immersed in club culture that sometimes we forget certain parts of the public aren't so free thinking."

In 1995, Gillette performed the song live on the Brazilian children's music series Xuxa Hits, completely uncensored.

== Critical reception ==
Larry Flick from Billboard magazine described the song as a "goofy dance novelty single", adding that "comical female rants on the shortcomings of a lover are woven into a rigid groove. 'Clean' version has daintily been retitled 'Short short Man', bleeping out all blunt penis references." David Browne from Entertainment Weekly commented, "'Short Short Man' (also known as 'Short D — – Man'), with a hard, thumping beat and, er, a harder message: 'You need some tweezers to put that little thing away?' Gillette taunts. Ouch! If those jibes don't hurt enough, they're followed by synthesizer bleeps of mocking laughter."

Robbie Daw from Idolator said it "became a dance-crossover sensation — due, largely, to attention-grabbing lyrics like these: 'That has got to be the smallest dick I have ever seen in my whole life / Get the fuck outta here!'" He added, "In many ways, the song played at the time like the female response to hits by male artists that objectified women, such as 'Rump Shaker' and 'Bump N' Grind' — and the music-buying masses, er, grabbed on tightly, thanks to slightly-edited (read: cleaned up) version, 'Short short Man', being put into heavy rotation." Andy Beevers from Music Week rated it three out of five, adding that "this house track features a fiercely funny verbal assault that leaves little to imagination." He also concluded: "The track is not likely to get any radio play, but has been making up for it with plenty of club exposure."

James Hamilton from their Record Mirror Dance Update described it as a "hilarious bitchy comments prodded sparse bouncily jolting" song in his weekly dance column. Wendi Cermak from The Network Forty wrote that "a throbbing base line that's not bogged down by over-production complements the eloquent – and slightly politically incorrect – vocals." Pete Stanton from Smash Hits also gave it three out of five, saying, "Annoying beat, strange quirky noises, and the dodgiest lyrics in town. Let's just say it's about some girl complaining about some fella's tidgy widger." In March 2017, BuzzFeed ranked "Short Dick Man" number 54 in their list of "The 101 Greatest Dance Songs of the '90s".

== Chart performance ==
"Short Dick Man" proved to be successful on the charts all over the world, peaking at number two on the RPM Dance/Urban chart in Canada and number three on the Billboard Hot Dance Club Play chart in the United States. In Latin America, it became a number-one hit in El Salvador and Mexico and charted also in Brazil. In Europe, the single went to number-one in both France and Italy. It entered the top 10 also in Austria (6), Belgium (6), Germany (3) and the Netherlands (7), as well as on the Eurochart Hot 100, where it peaked at number seven. Additionally, "Short Dick Man" was a top 20 hit in Scotland (14) and the United Kingdom. In the latter, it peaked at number eleven in its second run at the UK Singles Chart, on September 24, 1995. But on the UK Dance Chart, it was an even bigger hit, reaching number three. In Oceania, the single charted at numbers four and seven in Australia and New Zealand, respectively. On the US Billboard Hot 100, it reached number 14, while on the Canadian The Record Retail Singles chart, it reached number six.

"Short Dick Man" earned a gold record in Germany and the US, with a sale of 250,000 and 500,000 singles, and a silver record in France, when 125,000 units were sold there.

== Music video ==
The accompanying music video for "Short Dick Man" was directed by Daniel Zirilli. It was A-listed on French and German music television channels MCM and VIVA in February 1995. The video was also a Box Top on British The Box from January same year.

== Cover versions ==
In 1995, the song was covered by Machito Ponce and Diamanda Turbin as "Short Dick Man (¡Ponte A Brincar!)". In 2007, the song was covered by Laurent Wolf, featuring Marilyn David. This 3:35 version is available on several compilations, such as Été 2007 and Contact Play & Dance vol. 4.

== Formats and track listings ==
- CD single
1. "Short Dick Man" (radio mix) – 3:16
2. "Short Dick Man" (J.J. energy mix radio edit) – 3:20
- CD maxi
1. "Short Dick Man" (Radio Mix) – 3:21
2. "Short Dick Man" (Bass Mix) – 4:54
3. "Short Dick Man" (Jazzy Mix) – 4:51
4. "Short Dick Man" (Accapella) – 4:23
5. "Short Dick Man" (Club Mix) – 4:50
6. "Short Dick Man" (J.J. Energy Mix) – 4:39
7. "Short Dick Man" (Insane Mix) – 5:07
8. "Short Dick Man" (Dub Mix) – 2:41
- 12-inch maxi
1. "Short Dick Man" (club mix) – 4:48
2. "Short Dick Man" (a cappella) – 4:17
3. "Short Dick Man" (bass mix) – 4:51
4. "Short Dick Man" (radio edit) – 3:16
- CD maxi – Italian remixes
1. "Short Dick Man" (heavy dick version) – 10:33
2. "Short Dick Man" (aladino remix) – 5:04
3. "Short Dick Man" (pagany "the sound" remix) – 6:10
4. "Short Dick Man" (Ti.Pi.Cal. planet remix) – 8:33
5. "Short Dick Man" (unity 3 bip remix) – 6:01
6. "Short Dick DJ" (Old Betsy – NoiseLab Crew remix) – 4:29

== Personnel ==
- Written by Charlie Babie and Manfred Mohr
- Vocals by Gillette
- Mastered by Mark Richardson, at Metropolis Mastering, Chicago
- Produced by Charlie Babie
- Mixed by Onofrio Lollino and J.J. Flores
- Published by Tango Rose Music (ASCAP)
- Distributed by ID Records, 1994

== Charts ==
=== Weekly charts ===
20 Fingers version

Chart (1994–1995)	Peak position
Australia (ARIA)	4
Austria (Ö3 Austria Top 40)	6
Belgium (Ultratop 50 Flanders)	10
Belgium (Ultratop 50 Wallonia)	6
Canada Retail Singles (The Record)	6
Canada Dance/Urban (RPM)	2
El Salvador (El Siglo de Torreón)	1
Europe (Eurochart Hot 100)	7
Europe (European Dance Radio)	3
France (SNEP)	1
Germany (GfK)	3
Iceland (Íslenski Listinn Topp 40)	11
Israel (Israeli Singles Chart)	5
Italy (Musica e dischi)	1
Mexico (Notitas Musicales)	1
Netherlands (Dutch Top 40)	7
Netherlands (Single Top 100)	9
New Zealand (Recorded Music NZ)	7
Scottish Singles Sales (Official Charts) "Short, Short Man"	14
UK Singles (Official Charts)	21
UK Singles (Official Charts) "Short, Short Man"	11
UK Dance (Official Charts)	3
UK Hip Hop/R&B (Official Charts)	38
UK Club Chart (Music Week)	4
US Billboard Hot 100	14
US Dance Club Play (Billboard)	3
US Maxi-Singles Sales (Billboard)	3
US Top 40/Rhythm-Crossover (Billboard)	28
US Cash Box Top 100	26

Machito Ponce version

Chart (1995)	Peak position
Spain (AFYVE)	2

=== Year-end charts ===
Chart (1994)	Position
Netherlands (Dutch Top 40)	120
Netherlands (Single Top 100)	63
UK Club Chart (Music Week)	56
US Dance Club Play (Billboard)	31
US Maxi-Singles Sales (Billboard)	13

Chart (1995)	Position
Australia (ARIA)	67
Austria (Ö3 Austria Top 40)	34
Belgium (Ultratop 50 Flanders)	99
Belgium (Ultratop 50 Wallonia)	18
Brazil (Crowley)	59
Canada Dance/Urban (RPM)	34
Europe (Eurochart Hot 100)	40
France (SNEP)	18
Germany (Media Control)	24
Netherlands (Dutch Top 40)	140
US Billboard Hot 100	76

== Certifications ==
Region	Certification	Certified units/sales
France (SNEP)	Gold	250,000^{*}
Germany (BVMI)	Gold	250,000^{^}
United States (RIAA) for Short, Short Man	Gold	500,000^{^}
^{*} Sales figures based on certification alone.^{^} Shipments figures based on certification alone.

== Release history ==
Region	Date	Format(s)	Label(s)	Ref.
Germany	August 31, 1994	CD	ZYX Music	
United Kingdom	November 14, 1994	12-inch vinyl; CD; cassette	Multiply	

== See also ==
- List of French number-one hits of 1995
