= Our Little Visionary =

Studio album by Dogstar
- Released: August 27, 1996
- Studio: A&M, Hollywood
- Genre: Rock
- Length: 40:58
- Label: Zoo
- Producer: Ed Stasium

Dogstar chronology
Quattro Formaggi (1996)	Our Little Visionary (1996)	Happy Ending (2000)

Our Little Visionary is the debut album by rock trio Dogstar. It was primarily distributed in Japan. It was recorded and mixed at A&M Studios in Hollywood, California, and mastered at Precision Mastering.

== Critical reception ==
Professional ratings
Review scores
Source	Rating
AllMusic	3/5 stars

The Colorado Springs Gazette-Telegraph noted that Reeves's "bass lines are easy, and with him as a distraction, Dogstar has gotten a little too much attention for its generic rock, which blends heavy Soul Asylum-style aggression with melodies that seem ripped out of the Gin Blossoms songbook."

== Track listing ==
1. "Forgive" – 1:59
2. "Our Little Visionary" – 3:03
3. "No Matter What" – 2:59 (Badfinger cover)
4. "Breathe Tonight" – 3:00
5. "Nobody Home" – 3:37
6. "History Light" – 6:03
7. "Honesty Anyway" – 3:20
8. "And I Pray" – 3:46
9. "Enchanted" – 3:14
10. "Bleeding Soul" – 3:47
11. "Goodbye" – 4:19
12. "Denial" – 1:51

== Personnel ==
Dogstar

- Bret Domrose – vocals, guitar
- Keanu Reeves – bass, backing vocals
- Robert Mailhouse – drums, percussion, backing vocals

Technical

- Ed Stasium – producer, mixer, backing vocals on track 3
- Tacia Domrose – backing vocals on track 3
- Stephen Marcussen – mastering
- Paul Hamingson – engineer
- John Aguto – engineer

Photography

- Sherry Etheredge (album cover)
- Marina Chavez (Dogstar)
