= Feel It (DJ Felli Fel song) =

Single by DJ Felli Fel featuring T-Pain, Sean Paul, Flo Rida and Pitbull

from the album Go DJ!
- Released: February 10, 2009
- Genre: Hip-hop, hip house
- Length: 3:49
- Label: So So Def; Island Def Jam
- Songwriter(s): James Reigart; Faheem Najm; Sean Henriques; Tramar Dillard; Armando Perez; Carlos Rosario; Manfred Mohr
- Producer(s): DJ Felli Fel

DJ Felli Fel singles chronology
"Finer Things" (2008)	"Feel It" (2009)	"Boomerang" (2011)

T-Pain singles chronology
"Hustler's Anthem '09" (2009)	"Feel It" (2009)	"All the Above" (2009)

Sean Paul singles chronology
"Come Over" (2008)	"Feel It" (2009)	"So Fine" (2009)

Flo Rida singles chronology
"Right Round" (2009)	"Feel It" (2009)	"Shone" (2009)

Pitbull singles chronology
"Krazy" (2008)	"Feel It" (2009)	"Shooting Star" (2009)

"Feel It" is a song by DJ Felli Fel released as his third single. The recording features T-Pain, Sean Paul, Flo Rida and Pitbull. The song samples 20 Fingers' 1994 hit song "Lick It". The single was released on February 10, 2009. There is also a version featuring Nelly.

== Charts ==
Chart (2009)	Peak position
Germany (Deutsche Black Charts)	9
US Billboard Pop 100	90
US Billboard Rap Airplay	25
