= Somewhere Between the Power Lines and Palm Trees =

Studio album by Dogstar
- Released: October 6, 2023
- Recorded: 2022
- Studio: Kingsize (Los Angeles)
- Genre: Rock
- Length: 39:58
- Label: QPrime
- Producer: Dave Trumfio

Dogstar chronology
Happy Ending (2000)	Somewhere Between the Power Lines and Palm Trees (2023)	All In Now (2026)

Somewhere Between the Power Lines and Palm Trees is the third studio album by American band Dogstar, released on October 6, 2023, through the band's label Dillon Street Records. The album is their first since Happy Ending in 2000, and follows their 2020 reformation. It was supported by the single "Everything Turns Around". The band toured in support of the album the same year.

== Background ==
Dogstar reunited for jam sessions in early 2020, after which they began writing together. In two and a half months, the band had written the songs for the album. It was crafted with the intention of playing it live, and the band stated that the lead single "Everything Turns Around" was intended to have "an uplifting message and a positive vibe that hopefully makes your day a little bit lighter". Most songs from the album were played live at the May 2023 BottleRock Napa Valley music festival.

== Track listing ==
All tracks are written by Bret Domrose, Keanu Reeves and Robert Mailhouse.

Somewhere Between the Power Lines and Palm Trees track listing
No.	Title	Length
1.	"Blonde"	3:18
2.	"How the Story Ends"	3:14
3.	"Everything Turns Around"	3:00
4.	"Overhang"	3:59
5.	"Dillon Street"	3:38
6.	"Lily"	2:44
7.	"Lust"	2:34
8.	"Glimmer"	4:43
9.	"Sunrise"	3:20
10.	"Sleep"	3:54
11.	"Upside"	2:50
12.	"Breach"	2:44
Total length:		39:58

== Personnel ==
Dogstar

- Bret Domrose – vocals, guitar, mixing, cover photo
- Robert Mailhouse – drums, percussion, mixing (all tracks), harmonica (track 5), backing vocals (12), band photography
- Keanu Reeves – bass guitar, mixing

Additional contributors

- Dave Trumfio – production, mixing, mastering, engineering, recording (all tracks); additional guitars (track 1)
- Rudyard Lee Cullers – engineering, recording
- Lawrence Azerrad – art direction, design
- Brian Bowen Smith – band photography, scenic photography
