= Powerful Pain Relief =

Studio album by Love Jones
- Released: 1995
- Genre: Lounge
- Label: Zoo
- Producers: Paul du Gré, Love Jones

Love Jones chronology
Here's to the Losers (1993)	Powerful Pain Relief (1995)

Powerful Pain Relief is the second album by the American band Love Jones, released in 1995. The band was considered part of the mid-1990s "Cocktail Nation" trend of retro cocktail lounge groups.

The first single from the album was "The Thing". Love Jones supported Powerful Pain Relief by opening for the Presidents of the United States of America on a North American tour.

== Production ==
The album was produced by Paul du Gré and Love Jones. The band downplayed the sillier lyrics of their first album and concentrated more on the groove of the songs. The conga player and vocalist Ben Daughtrey left the band after the completion of Powerful Pain Relief.

== Critical reception ==
Professional ratings
Review scores
Source	Rating
AllMusic	3/5 stars

Trouser Press thought that "better songwriting and fatter arrangements carry the ebullient opener, 'The Thing', into sly cuts like 'Vigilante' and the solipsistic 'Me'." CMJ New Music Monthly wrote that the album "shows the band as determinedly campy as ever, playing the kind of richly instrumental, overly opulent '70s jazz-pop that made the Association so famous." The Austin Chronicle concluded that "fans of pink elephants, shag carpeting, and swizzle sticks will sway their velvet-clad booties quite righteously to Powerful Pain Relief; everyone else will miss the point entirely."

The St. Louis Post-Dispatch said that "the tacky (not funny enough to be called kitschy) collection includes the title track, a phony-sounding, Dee-Lite-style love song; the insipid Sly Stone-ripoff, 'World of Summer'; and 'Vigilante', a laughable attempt at menacing, blaxploitation-film badness." The Colorado Springs Gazette-Telegraph deemed the album "a wildly funky brand of lounge music that contains more soul than anything Lawrence Welk ever did."

AllMusic wrote that "the band evolved their loungey sound away from a Combustible Edison bossa nova vibe to more rock but still created a smooth, cocktail mood."

== Track listing ==
No.	Title	Length
1.	"The Thing"	3:36
2.	"You Don't Know Me"	3:20
3.	"World of Summer"	5:12
4.	"Help Wanted"	3:39
5.	"Peepin'"	2:34
6.	"Stars"	2:33
7.	"Vigilante"	3:08
8.	"Roll-On"	3:53
9.	"Me"	3:03
10.	"Blue Sky"	3:59
11.	"Powerful Pain Relief"	5:00
