= Boomerang (DJ Felli Fel song) =

Single by DJ Felli Fel featuring Akon, Pitbull and Jermaine Dupri

from the album Go DJ!
- Released: March 27, 2011
- Recorded: 2011
- Genre: Hip house
- Length: 3:29
- Label: So So Def; Island Def Jam
- Songwriter(s): James Reigart; Aliaune Thiam; Armando Perez; Jermaine Mauldin; William Rappaport; Henri Lanz; Miguel De Vivo; Alexander Schwartz; Joseph Khajadourian
- Producer(s): DJ Felli Fel

DJ Felli Fel singles chronology
"Feel It" (2009)	"Boomerang" (2011)	"It's Your Birthday B!tch" (2012)

Akon singles chronology
"Who Dat Girl" (2011)	"Boomerang" (2011)	"Famous" (2011)

Pitbull singles chronology
"Rabiosa" (2011)	"Boomerang" (2011)	"Rain Over Me" (2011)

"Boomerang" is a song by DJ Felli Fel released as his fourth single in March 2011. It features Akon, Pitbull and Jermaine Dupri. The song peaked at number 34 on the Netherlands Singles Chart.

== Track listing ==
- Digital download
1. "Boomerang" (Original Version) (featuring Akon, Pitbull and Jermaine Dupri) - 3:29
2. "Boomerang" (Clean Version) (featuring Akon, Pitbull and Jermaine Dupri) - 3:29
3. "Boomerang" (Club Version) (featuring Akon, Pitbull and Jermaine Dupri) - 4:30
4. "Boomerang" (Instrumental Version) - 3:30

== Charts ==
Chart (2011)	Peak position
Netherlands (Dutch Top 40)	34
