= Course of Empire (album) =

Studio album by Course of Empire
- Released: November 1990
- Label: Carpe Diem Records; Zoo Entertainment (reissue)
- Producer: David Castell

Course of Empire chronology
| Course of Empire (1990) | Initiation (1994) |

Professional ratings
Review scores
| Source | Rating |
|---|---|
| AllMusic | 3/5 stars |

Course of Empire is the debut album by American rock band Course of Empire. All songs were written by Course of Empire and produced by David Castell (Blue October, Burden Brothers, Deep Blue Something, SouthFM). The following August, Zoo Entertainment signed the band and reissued their CD with distribution through BMG.

== Track listing ==
1. "Ptah" – 4:17
2. "Coming of the Century" – 4:04
3. "God's Jig" – 4:02
4. "Copious" – 3:34
5. "Cradle Calls" – 4:32
6. "Under the Skies" – 4:10
7. "Peace Child" – 5:43
8. "Sins of the Fathers" – 3:25
9. "Thrust" – 7:21
10. "Mountains of the Spoken" – 3:42
11. "Dawn of the Great Eastern Sun" – 6:37

=== Zoo Reissue ===
Zoo Entertainment remixed and remastered the album in January 1992, which resulted in significantly different track lengths.

1. "Ptah" – 3:14
2. "Coming of the Century" – 4:04
3. "God's Jig" – 4:02
4. "Copious" – 3:31
5. "Cradle Calls" – 4:03
6. "Under the Skies" – 4:08
7. "Peace Child" – 4:46
8. "Sins Of The Fathers" – 3:26
9. "Thrust" – 7:30
10. "Mountains of the Spoken" – 3:41
11. "Dawn of the Great Eastern Sun" – 6:39

== Personnel ==
- Vaughn Stevenson – vocals
- Mike Graff – guitar
- Paul Semrad – bass
- Chad Lovell – drums, programming
- Anthony Headley – drums, synthesizer
- Dave Abbruzzese – drums
- David Castell – keyboards, flute, string arrangement
- Tom Demer – viola
- Tom Shinness – cello
- Tom Head – tabla
- Robert Renfrow – keyboards
