= Love Jones (band) =

American band

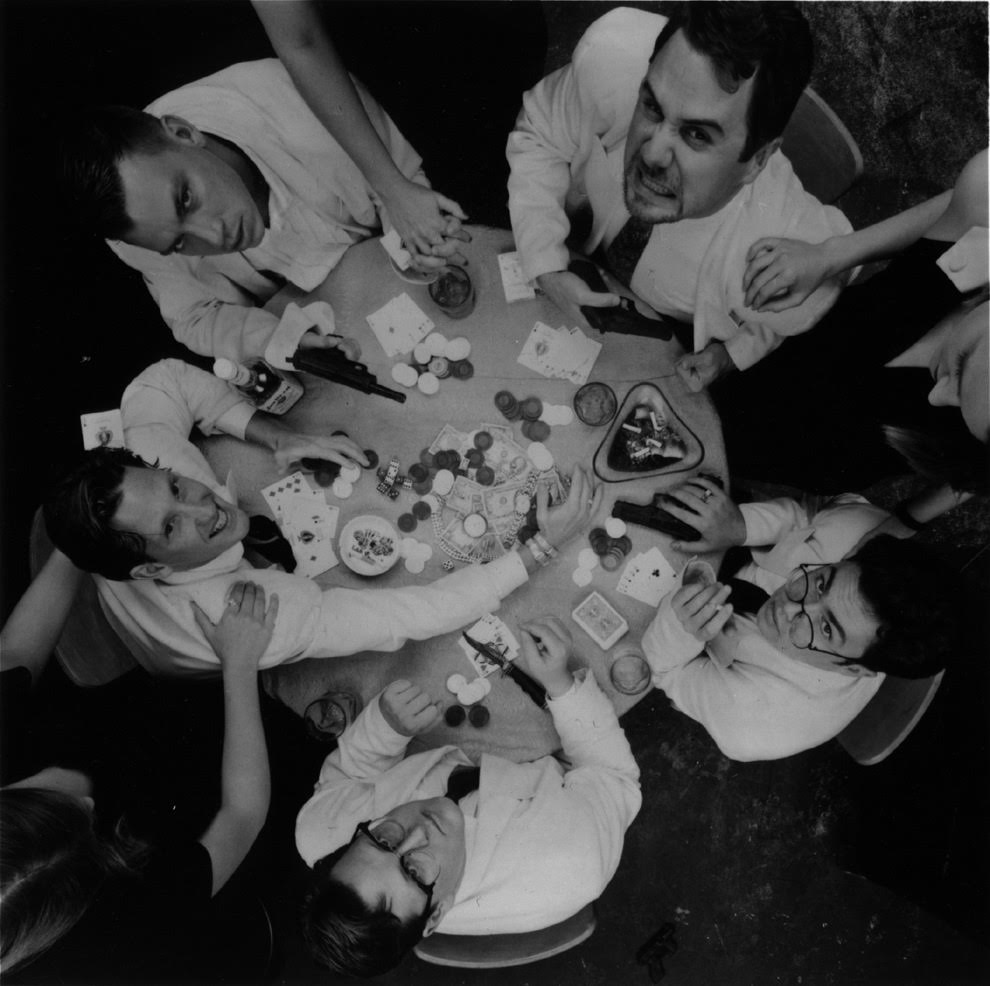
- Love Jones Promotional Picture 1993

Background information
- Origin: Louisville, Kentucky, U.S.
- Genres: Lounge, easy listening, traditional pop
- Years active: 1990–2019 2026
- Label: Zoo Entertainment
- Members: Ben Daughtrey; Barry Thomas; Chris Hawpe; Jonathan Palmer; Stuart Johnson
- Website: www.love-jones.com

Love Jones is an American band from Louisville, Kentucky formed in 1990 and consists of Ben Daughtrey (vocals, percussion), Barry Thomas (bass), Chris Hawpe (vocals, guitar), Jonathan Palmer (vocals), and Stuart Johnson (drums).

Love Jones was prominent among the "Cocktail Nation" groups of the early 1990s. The genre — which included Combustible Edison, The Coctails and Donkey — was a reaction to the grunge music of the early 1990s. Cocktail Nation bands celebrated the aesthetics and music of the 1950s and early 1960s — lounge jazz, crooning pop, and martinis. Love Jones played any sort of pop music that fit within that label: pop, blues, R&B, bossa nova, doo wop.

== History ==
Love Jones formed in 1990 in Louisville, Ky., along with bands like Slint and Palace Brothers, demonstrating the diversity of the city's music scene. In 1992, Love Jones moved to Los Angeles and staged a weekly residency show at the famed nightclub Largo. The show featured frequent guest performer Jon Brion, who appears on several Love Jones recordings.

In 1992 Love Jones signed with Zoo Entertainment/BMG shortly after releasing a single on Minty Fresh Records. The band was first brought to the attention of Zoo Entertainment/BMG by guitarist Adam Jones of Tool, who were with the label at the time. The band would eventually contribute the hidden track "Santa Monica and Orange" to Love Jones' debut album for Zoo, 1993's Here's to the Losers.

Here's to the Losers—co-produced by the band and Rod O'Brien—contains a wide mix of styles, including disco, Blaxploitation film soundtracks, samba, soul and funk. Key tracks include "Central Avenue," "Li'l Black Book," "Custom Van," "Drive-In," "Ohio River" and "Fragile." Jon Brion is featured on many tracks, playing piano and organ. Ben Daughtrey directed the music video for "Pineapple."

1995's Powerful Pain Relief—co-produced by the band and Paul duGré—reveals more of Love Jones' influences, including Isaac Hayes, early Chicago, Earth Wind & Fire and Chic. Key tracks include the title track, "World of Summer," "You Don't Know Me" and "The Thing." Jon Brion again contributes, playing various keyboards on several tracks. Liz Friedlander directed the music video for "The Thing."

2010's independent release Forever—co-produced by Love Jones and Matthew Libman—includes key tracks "Charm City" and "Hey California."

Love Jones' signature song "Paid For Lovin'" was featured in the film Swingers after the band developed a relationship with Jon Favreau and Vince Vaughn, who frequently attended Love Jones' shows. Love Jones bassist Barry Thomas was a Music Consultant on Swingers.

In addition to recorded works and live performances, Love Jones appeared in the films Since You've Been Gone directed by David Schwimmer, and French Exit (1995 film) starring Jonathan Silverman and Mädchen Amick. They also appeared in the 2002 Cameron Diaz film The Sweetest Thing as the wedding band. They can also be seen in the Pedro Zamora tribute episode of The Real World: San Francisco.

The band performed two songs on The Tonight Show Starring Jimmy Fallon on January 10, 2019, "Here's to the Losers" and "Ohio River", joined by Jimmy Fallon on the latter.

They reunited in 2026, releasing their fourth studio album The Greatest Show on Earth.

== Discography ==
Year	Title	Notes
1993	I Like Young Girls b/w Lil' Black Book	45 RPM Single on Minty Fresh Records
1993	Here's To The Losers	Track 4 is Tool covering "Paid For Loving"
1995	Powerful Pain Relief	Jon Brion plays keyboards
1995	Love Jones - Live In Hollywood	Vinyl only release on Classic Records
1996	Swingers soundtrack Certified GOLD	"Paid For Loving" (1993)
2010	Forever...	
2018	Here's To The Losers Vinyl - 25th Anniversary Reissue - 2 LPs	Track 4 is Tool covering "Paid For Loving"; Side 4 is previously unreleased material
