= Initiation (Course of Empire album) =

Studio album by Course of Empire
- Released: January 18, 1994
- Genre: Alternative rock, industrial rock
- Label: Zoo Entertainment
- Producer: David Castell

Course of Empire chronology
Course of Empire (1990)	Initiation (1994)	Telepathic Last Words (1998)

Professional ratings
Review scores
Source	Rating
AllMusic	link

Initiation is the second album by American rock band Course of Empire. All songs were written by Course of Empire and production by David Castell.

While many CDs of the same era contained a hidden track after the finish of the listed tracks, usually preceded by a span silence, Course of Empire and David Castell managed to fit three on Initiation. "Running Man" was hidden in the pregap of the CD, which nearly caused legal action when another producer/engineer claimed that he had patented the use of the pregap for audio information. The "Darwin Goodwin Mix" of the song "Infested" was hidden after "The Chihuahuaphile" (which was track 23 -the number of The Illuminati, after a cross fade that counted up the tracks between it and "Initiation"). And "Tomorrow" was buried inside the feedback noise of "The Gate" and only able to be heard if the stereo track was played over a Mono Music system.

== Track listing ==
pregap = "Running Man" – 6:49

1. "Hiss" – 4:34
2. "White Vision Blowout" – 3:58
3. "Gear" – 3:14
4. "Breed" – 4:38
5. "Apparition" – 5:05
6. "Infested!" – 6:19
7. "Invertebrate" – 4:11
8. "Sacrifice" – 3:51
9. "Minions" – 7:59
10. "Initiation" – 6:46

12–22 = either: a) The Gate which is a long guitar feedback soundscape, (in stereo speakers) or b) Tomorrow which is an acoustic number (heard via mono speakers only)

"The Chihuahuaphile" – 4:21
