= Dogstar (band) =

American rock band

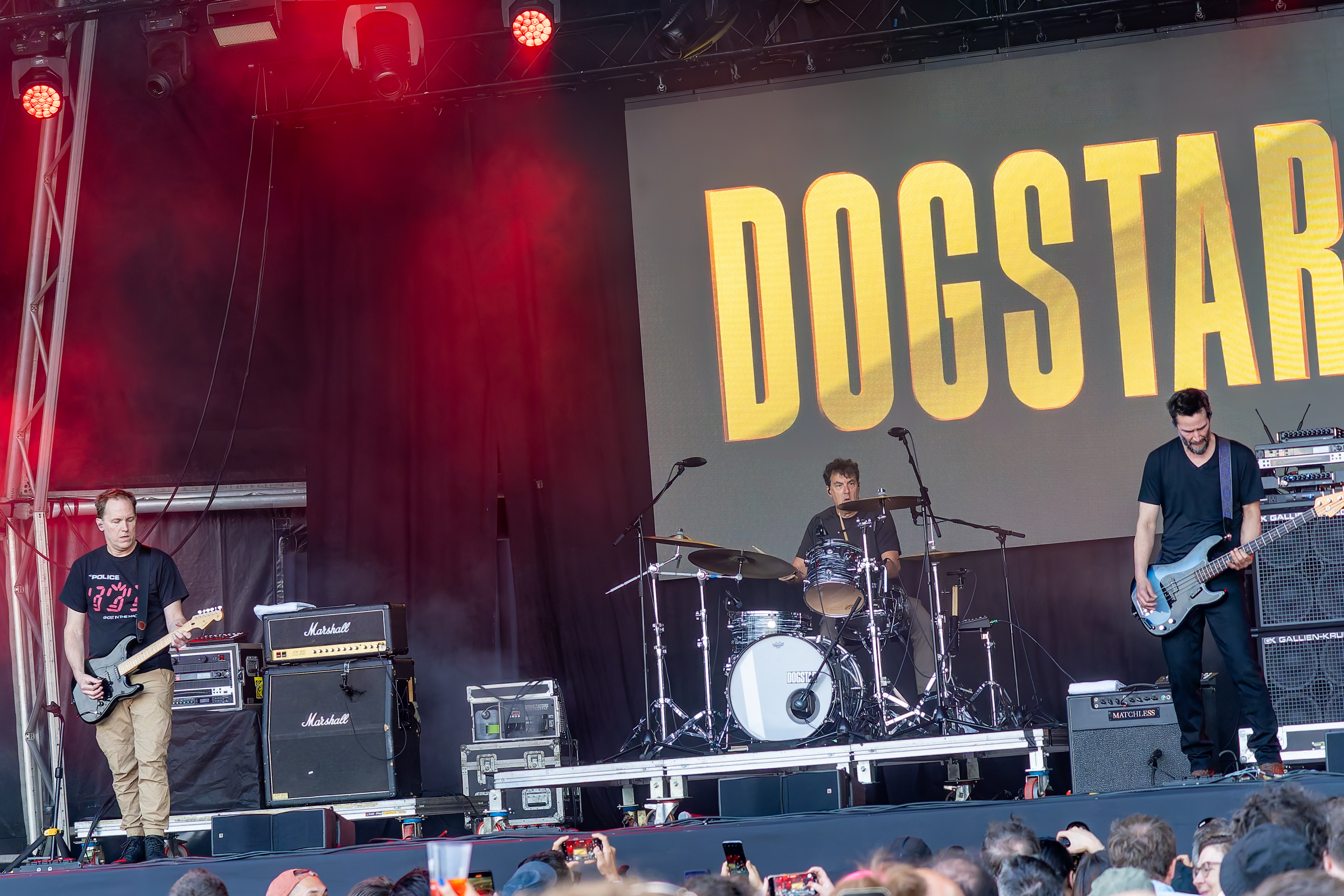
- Dogstar performing at Primavera Sound 2024 (from left to right): Bret Domrose, Robert Mailhouse, and Keanu Reeves

Background information
- Origin: Los Angeles, California, United States
- Genres: Alternative rock; grunge
- Years active: 1991–2002; 2020–present
- Labels: Zoo; Ultimatum Music; Dillon Street
- Members: Keanu Reeves; Robert Mailhouse; Bret Domrose
- Past members: Gregg Miller
- Website: www.dogstarofficial.com

Dogstar is an American alternative rock band formed in 1991 in Los Angeles, California. The band consists of drummer Robert Mailhouse, bassist Keanu Reeves and guitarist/lead vocalist Bret Domrose, who initially joined in 1994 and later replaced founding member Gregg Miller in 1995 to become the vocalist. They were active from the mid-1990s to the early 2000s, during which time the band found moderate success and garnered media attention due to Reeves' status as a Hollywood actor.

The group broke up in 2002 but continued to meet for jam sessions, eventually resuming songwriting in 2020. Their reunion was announced in 2022, followed by a new album in 2023. Their latest album, All In Now was released on May 29, 2026.

== Inception and name origin ==
The genesis of Dogstar was a chance encounter between Robert Mailhouse and Keanu Reeves in a supermarket in 1991. Mailhouse was wearing a Detroit Red Wings hockey sweater, and Reeves (an avid hockey fan and a keen player of the sport) asked if Mailhouse needed a goalie. As the two men formed a friendship, they began jamming together, and were joined by Gregg Miller as the original lead guitarist and singer in 1992. Reeves said that one thing led to another in the band's history:

You know, we started in a garage, and then you end up starting to write songs, and then you're like "Let's go out and play them!", and then you're like "Let's go on tour!", and then...you're playing

— Keanu Reeves in an interview with Jimmy Fallon

The band originally called themselves Small Fecal Matter, and then BFS (Big Fucking Shit, or Big Fucking Sound), before settling on Dogstar, after Mailhouse found the name in the book Sexus, written by Henry Miller.

== History ==
=== 1994–1999: Quattro Formaggi, Our Little Visionary and live performances ===
Dogstar was joined by Bret Domrose as an additional vocalist and guitarist in 1994. One year later, the band toured extensively throughout the U.S. and Asia, and opened for David Bowie at his 1995 Hollywood Palladium gig, where they covered a song by Pink Floyd, as well as for Bon Jovi on their 1995 These Days – Crossroads Tour in Australia and New Zealand. However, Miller left the band at the end of the tour. With Quattro Formaggi, they released their first disc, a four-track EP in 1996, via Zoo Entertainment, and followed this up with their debut album, Our Little Visionary, which was only distributed in Japan, even though Dogstar already had a worldwide fanbase at the time. The band also performed at the 1996 Zwemdokrock Festival in Lummen, Belgium, and the 1999 Glastonbury Festival in Pilton, Somerset, England.

=== 1999–2002: Happy Ending, breakup and post-Dogstar ===
Although the band members had other work commitments, a second album, Happy Ending, followed in 1999, produced by Michael Vail Blum and Richie Zito. Domrose called the music on this record more "pop-aggressive" than the band's earlier work. Their last performance of their initial run was in October 2002 in Japan, and the band broke up afterwards. Domrose went on to perform as a solo artist, briefly played guitar with the band Berlin and is currently writing music for film and television. Reeves and Mailhouse later performed together in a band called "becky".

=== 2020–present: rehearsals and reunion ===
In the years following the band's final performance in 2002, its three members occasionally met up for jam sessions at Mailhouse's home in Silver Lake. The beginning of the COVID-19 pandemic in March 2020 led the band members to spend more time together in quarantine. Eight-hour rehearsal days soon turned into songwriting sessions; within two and a half months, the band had written more than enough songs for a new album, which they enlisted Dave Trumfio to produce. In July 2022, a post on Dogstar's Instagram account declared, "We’re back".

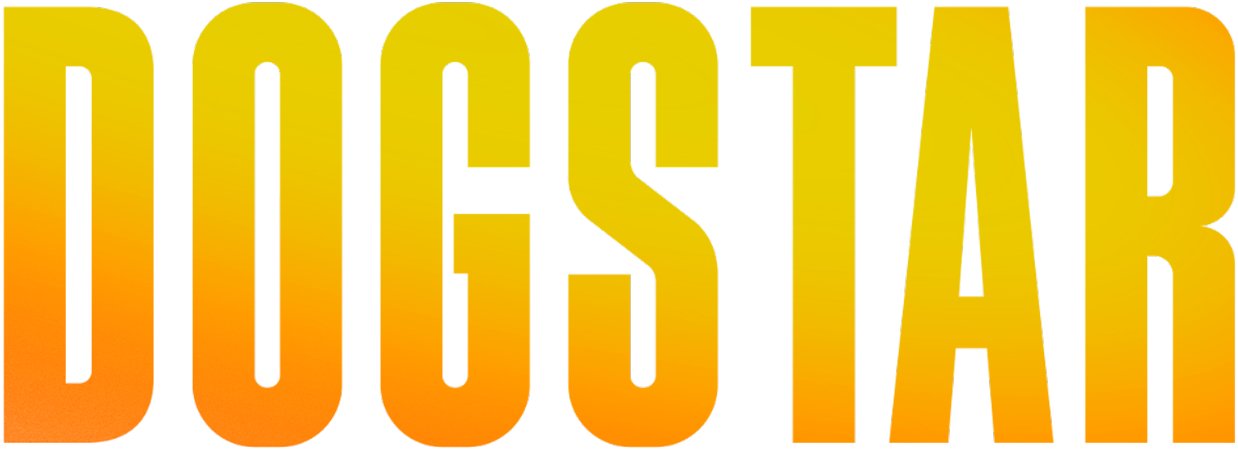
Band logo used since 2023

In May 2023, Dogstar gave its first public performance in over 20 years at the BottleRock Napa Valley music festival, after an invitation from the festival's organizers. The performance consisted of songs from the band's first two albums, alongside new music from their upcoming third album. Two months later, the band released the single "Everything Turns Around" and announced their third album, Somewhere Between the Power Lines and Palm Trees, released on October 6, 2023. The band also announced a 25-date tour in North America and Japan in support of the album, beginning August 10 in Hermosa Beach, California. In June 2024, the band announced their Summer Vacation Tour, with shows scheduled from August to September in the US and Canada in support of the album.

In March 2026, the band announced its album All In Now would release on May 29, 2026 and released its title track as a single.

== Appearances and influences ==
The band appeared in the 1999 road drama Me and Will, as well as the 2005 comedy-drama Ellie Parker.

Dogstar had several opening acts that went on to become notable, such as Rancid and Weezer (the latter's first gig was opening for Dogstar).

In 2010, singer-songwriter Rain Perry released a song called "Keanuville" about a Dogstar fan she met at one of their concerts.

== Band members ==
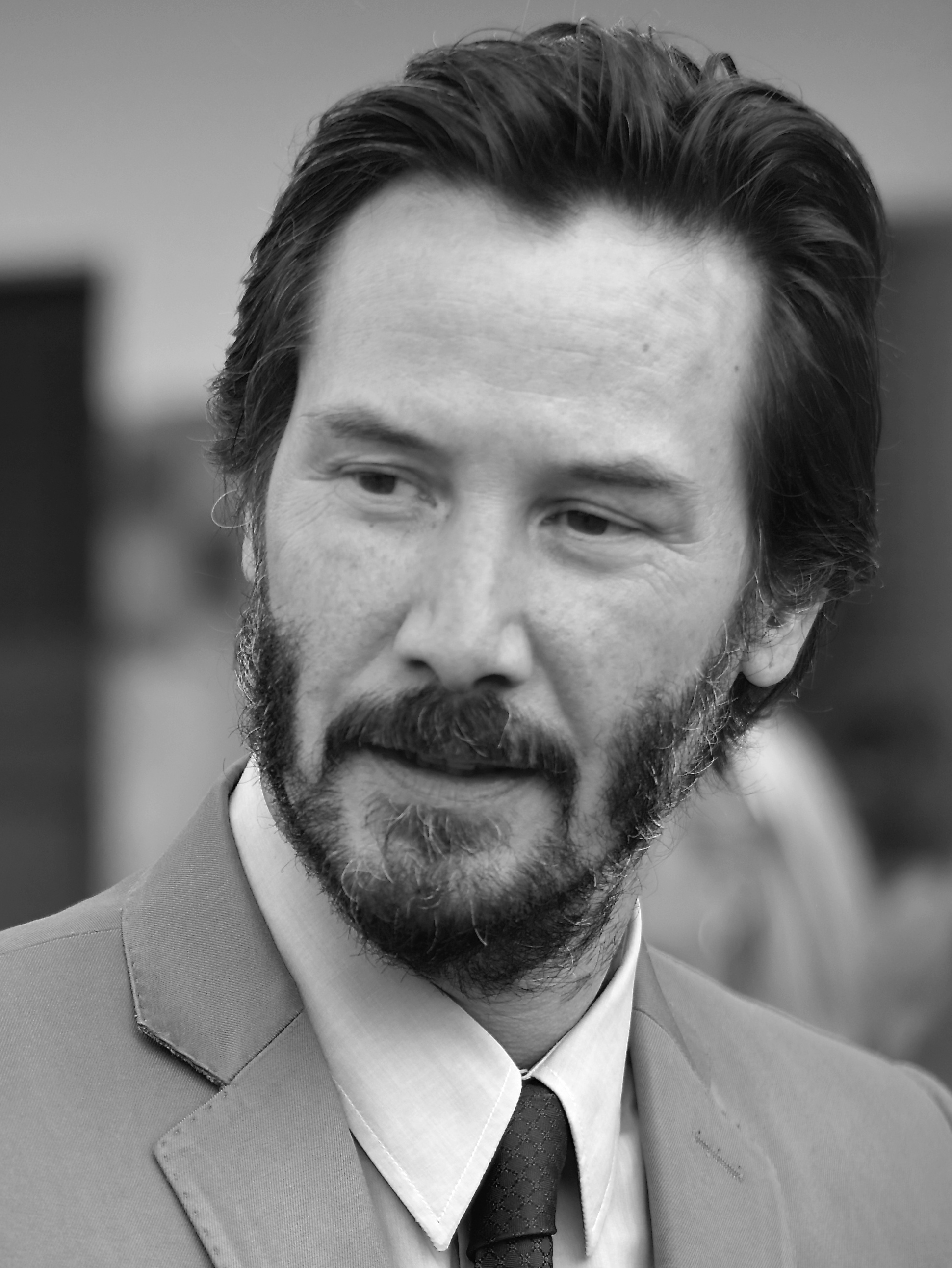
The bassist for Dogstar, Keanu Reeves, is better known for his roles in Hollywood films.

=== Current ===
- Keanu Reeves – bass, backing vocals (1991–2002, 2020–present)
- Robert Mailhouse – drums, backing vocals (1991–2002, 2020–present)
- Bret Domrose – guitar (1994–2002, 2020–present), lead vocals (1995–2002, 2020–present), backing vocals (1994–1995)

=== Former ===
- Gregg Miller – guitar, lead vocals (1991–1995)

== Discography ==
=== Albums ===
- Our Little Visionary (1996, Zoo Entertainment)
- Happy Ending (2000, Ultimatum Music)
- Somewhere Between the Power Lines and Palm Trees (2023, Dillon Street Records)
- All in Now (2026)

=== EPs ===
- Quattro Formaggi (1996, Zoo Entertainment)

=== Other ===
- "Shine" on the Mr. Big tribute album Influences & Connections – Volume One: Mr. Big (2004)

=== Singles ===
Year	Single	Peak chart positions			Album
Year	Single	US Alt	US Main.	US Rock Air.	Album
2026	"All In Now"	32	21	47	All In Now

=== Music videos ===
List of music videos, showing year released and director
Title	Year	Director(s)
"Everything Turns Out"	2023	Josh Oreck
"Breach"	2023	Josh Oreck
"All In Now"	2026	Carlos Garcia Medina
"Joy"	2026	Carlos Garcia Medina
"This Sphere"	2026	Carlos Garcia Medina
