= It's Over Now (Cause and Effect song) =

Single by Cause and Effect

from the album Trip
- B-side: "Words to Hold On To, Shakespeare's Sublimation"
- Released: May 23, 1994
- Recorded: London - Lilly Yard and Sarm West
- Genre: Synthpop
- Length: 4:09
- Label: BMG
- Songwriters: Rob Rowe & Keith Milo
- Producer: Martyn Phillips

Cause and Effect singles chronology
"Another Minute" (1991)	"It's Over Now" (1994)	"Alone" (1994)

"It's Over Now" is a song by the American synthpop band Cause&Effect. It was released as a single in 1994 and reached number 67 on the Billboard Hot 100 and number 7 on the Billboard Modern Rock chart in August 1994.

== Track listing ==
- 12" maxi-single Catalog #:72445 14138 1

A. "It's Over Now (It's Alright)" (Aborigine Mix) (7:02)
A. "It's Over Now (It's Alright)" (Combustion Mix) (6:21)
B. "It's Over Now (It's Alright)" (Outback Dub) (6:09)
B. "It's Over Now (It's Alright)" (Mood Mix) (5:03)

- CD maxi-single #1 Catalog #:72445 14130 2
1. "It's Over Now (It's Alright)" (7-inch Mix) (3:55)
2. "It's Over Now (It's Alright)" (Combustion Mix) (6:21)
3. "Shakespeare's Sublimation" (Liquid State Mix) (5:41)
4. "It's Over Now (It's Alright)" (Condensation Mix) (6:23)
5. "Words To Hold On To" (1/4 Mix) (4:19)
- CD maxi-single #2 Catalog #:72445 14145 2
1. "It's Over Now (It's Alright)" (7-inch Mix) (3:55)
2. "It's Over Now (It's Alright)" (Combustion Mix) (6:21)
3. "Shakespeare's Sublimation" (Liquid State Mix) (5:41)
4. "It's Over Now (It's Alright)" (Condensation Mix) (6:23)
5. "Words To Hold On To" (1/4 Mix) (4:19)
6. "It's Over Now (It's Alright)" (Aborigine Mix) (7:02)

== Charts ==
Chart (1994)	Peak position
US Billboard Hot 100	67
US Hot Dance Music-Club Play (Billboard)	40
US Cash Box Top 100	55
