= Finer Things (DJ Felli Fel song) =

Single by DJ Felli Fel featuring Kanye West, Jermaine Dupri, Fabolous and Ne-Yo

from the album Go DJ!
- Released: March 11, 2008
- Recorded: 2007–2008
- Genre: Hip-hop
- Length: 4:14
- Label: So So Def; Island Def Jam
- Songwriter(s): James Reigart; Kanye West; Jermaine Mauldin; John Jackson; Shaffer Smith
- Producer(s): DJ Felli Fel

DJ Felli Fel singles chronology
"Get Buck in Here" (2007)	"Finer Things" (2008)	"Feel It" (2009)

Kanye West singles chronology
"Homecoming" (2008)	"Finer Things" (2008)	"American Boy" (2008)

Jermaine Dupri singles chronology
"Baby Don't Go" (2007)	"Finer Things" (2008)	"Stepped on My J'z" (2008)

Fabolous singles chronology
"Baby Don't Go" (2007)	"Finer Things" (2008)	"Hi Hater (Remix)" (2008)

Ne-Yo singles chronology
"Bust It Baby Pt. 2" (2008)	"Finer Things" (2008)	"Closer" (2008)

"Finer Things" is a 2008 hip hop single by DJ Felli Fel. It features Kanye West, Jermaine Dupri, Fabolous, and Ne-Yo.

== Release ==
"Finer Things" was originally released as a song by Cyssero featuring Kanye West and Ne-Yo, as part of Cyssero's 2007 mixtape The 2nd Coming. When released as a single by DJ Felli Fel featuring Kanye West, Jermaine Dupri, Fabolous and Ne-Yo, it managed to chart at number 1 on the US Billboard Bubbling Under Hot 100.

== Track listing ==
CD single (US)

1. "Finer Things" (Clean) – 4:11
2. "Finer Things" (Dirty) – 4:11
3. "Finer Things" (Instrumental) – 4:11

Digital download (US)

1. "Finer Things" – 4:11

== Charts ==
Chart (2008)	Peak position
US Bubbling Under Hot 100 (Billboard)	1
US Hot R&B/Hip-Hop Songs (Billboard)	80
US Radio Songs (Billboard)	75
US Hot Rap Songs (Billboard)	8
