= 20 Fingers =

American music production team

- Origin: Chicago, Illinois, United States
- Genres: Dance, house
- Years active: 1994–1995 (as artist); 1996–present (as producers)
- Past members: Charlie Babie (Carlos Rosario); Manny Mohr (Manfred Mohr); J.J. Flores; Onofrio Lollino

20 Fingers is the name of an American production team consisting of producers and DJs Carlos "Charlie Babie" Rosario, Manfred "Manny" Mohr, J.J. Flores and Onofrio Lollino. They were popular in the mid-1990s for producing a series of pop, dance and rap songs, many of which were distinguished by their humorous or risqué lyrics.

== Musical career ==
=== 1993–1994: Formation and "Short Dick Man" ===
Originally consisting of producers and DJ's Carlos "Charlie Babie" Rosario and Manfred "Manny" Mohr, the two later received help by friends Jonathan "JJ" Flores and Onofrio Lollino, who did some of their remixes. The artist name comes from the band members simply both having twenty fingers on their hands together.

On August 31, 1994, the group released their first single "Short Dick Man", featuring vocalist and rapper Gillette on Zoo Entertainment/SOS Records from their debut album On The Attack and More, which was controversial. The tune was a global success, particularly in France where it was a number one hit for three weeks. It peaked the top 5 in several European countries such as Italy and Germany also reached the top ten in other countries, including Austria, Belgium, New Zealand and Australia. It also reached number 14 in the U.S. and was considered a club success there.

The single, which involved a woman mocking the size of a man's penis, was also released in a clean version replacing the words "short dick" with "short short", which was also released under the censored title "Short Short Man" in the UK and several other countries. This new version, remixed by Strike, reached number 11, whereas the original only reached number 21 on the UK Singles Chart in 1994.

Mohr told the Los Angeles Times that the point of the song was to attract attention. "We figured there were all these songs by men bashing women and treating women like sex objects. So we decided a song that turned the tables on men might attract some attention". According to Gillette, the point of the song is to "strike back at all the women-bashing songs in pop, especially in rap". In the accompanying music video, images of Gillette singing "Short Dick Man" or "Short Short Man" on a beach alternate with those of a brawny man performing a photo session.

=== 1994–1995: On the Attack and More and "Lick It" ===
20 Fingers released their debut studio album On the Attack and More in Poland and Germany. All eleven songs on this album were recorded with Gillette on guest vocals, except one song, the second single called "Lick It", which featured vocals of singer Roula. Their second single was another success in Europe and in clubs all around the world, which reached number 48 on the same chart.

In many other selected countries such as Brazil, Canada, Scandinavia, Australia, Japan, Portugal, Chile, South Korea or the U.S., the album has been released as Gillette's solo debut album with a similar front cover art, retitled On the Attack, the same eleven song track list with Gillette and excluding the eleventh song "Lick It". The duo scored another hit with their third and fourth singles "Mr. Personality" and "You're a Dog" with moderate success respectively, both with Gillette on featured vocals. In Germany and Poland, the two latter mentioned single releases were still credited under "20 Fingers feat. Gillette", while in the other countries as "Gillette". 20 Fingers also produced Max-A-Million's debut album Take Your Time.

In 1995, the group released their second self-titled studio album, 20 Fingers worldwide (or retitled simply as L'Album in France), which unlike the first album had the peculiarity of featuring different vocalists for almost every song. Next to all new original material, this album also consisted of three previously released 20 Fingers singles ("Short Dick Man", "Lick It", a remix of "Mr. Personality" called "Ugly") and two previously released Max-A-Million-produced singles "Take Your Time" and "Fat Boy". Other songs from their album were released as singles, credited only under the name of the featured vocalist, such as Nerada's "Position #9", Dania's "She Won't Know", Rochelle's "Praying for an Angel" and "Holding on to Love" or A' Lisa B's "I'm in Love".

The fact that all previous 20 Fingers singles, whether in their original or remixed form, are included on this album, it has been sometimes considered a compilation album and has been released under the title The Best of 20 Fingers in Asia. Their fifth single "Sex Machine" featuring singer Katrina (Roxanne Dawn), and (Camille Alvey) was released in 1995, which was another club hit but did not sell as well as its predecessors.

Max-A-Million's follow up third and fourth singles "Sexual Healing" and "Everybody's Groovin'" were also produced by 20 Fingers.

=== 1996–1999: Group hiatus and remixes ===
A "Megamix" of their first three hits was also released as a single in France only, titled "Megamix Explosion". Since 1996, no single releases had been released under the 20 Fingers artist name and the group went on hiatus but continued producing music and pursuing solo careers. Babie remixed songs from Donna Lori, Soundmaster T and Natalie Hagan under the names "Charlie" and "Charlie Babie", while Mohr wrote songs for other artists. In 1996, 20 Fingers produced Gillette's second solo album Shake Your Money Maker and its three single releases "Do Fries Go with That Shake?", "Bounce" and "Shake Your Money Maker" in 1996 and 1997. The album and the three singles didn't chart well. In 1996, Mohr and Babie wrote and produced the single "Push, Push" for Katrina.

=== 2000–present: Various productions ===
In 2000, Babie continued remixing songs from Destiny's Child, band members Beyoncé and Kelly Rowland, and Anastacia under the names "CB2000" and "Charlie's Nu Soul". Mohr and Babie wrote the song "Someone to Love Me" for singer La Rissa. In 2000, Mohr and Babie wrote and produced the song "Sex Tonight" from Gilette's third solo album Did I Say That, which was the first and only release out of the album and became a minor club hit in the U.S. In 2002 and 2003, Mohr and Babie wrote and produced the singles "Someone to Love" and "Gifted" for singers Angelina and Eyra Gail.

== Discography ==
=== Studio albums ===
Title	Details	Peak chart positions		Info
Title	Details	AUT	GER	Info
On the Attack and More	Release date: April 18, 1995; Label: ZYX Music; Formats: CD	24	26	Debut studio album by 20 Fingers. Released as Gillette's solo debut album in 1994, titled On the Attack in selected countries.
20 Fingers/L'Album	Release date: October 24, 1995; Label: ZYX Music; Formats: CD	—	—	Second and final studio album by 20 Fingers. Released as L'Album in France and Best of 20 Fingers in Asia with altered cover arts and tracklists.
"—" denotes releases that did not chart

=== Singles ===
Year	Title	Peak chart positions										Certifications (sales thresholds)	Album
Year	Title	US	AUT	BEL (Fl)	BEL (Wa)	FRA	GER	ITA	NLD	NZ	UK	Certifications (sales thresholds)	Album
1994	"Short Dick Man" (featuring Gillette)	14	6	10	6	1	3	1	7	7	11	RIAA: Gold; BVMI: Gold; SNEP: Silver	On the Attack and More
1995	"Lick It" (featuring Roula)	72	10	14	9	5	4	1	21	38	48	BVMI: Gold	On the Attack and More
1995	"Mr. Personality" (featuring Gillette) (Note: "Mr. Personality" was released as a Gillette solo song in selected countries.)	42	—	—	19	—	22	8	—	32	—		On the Attack and More
1995	"You're a Dog" (featuring Gillette) (Note: "You're a Dog" was released as a Gillette solo song in selected countries.)	—	—	—	—	—	—	—	—	—	—		On the Attack and More
1995	"Sex Machine" (featuring Katrina) (Note: "Sex Machine" is the only release of the European album version 20 Fingers labeled as "20 Fingers feat. Katrina".)	—	—	—	—	—	92	14	—	—	—		20 Fingers/L'Album
1995	"Holding On to Love" (Rochelle) (Note: "Holding On to Love" of the European album version 20 Fingers was released as a solo single by Rochelle, labeled as "Rochelle, A 20 Fingers Production".)	—	—	—	—	—	—	—	—	—	—		20 Fingers/L'Album
1995	"She Won't Know" (Dania) (Note: "She Won't Know" of the French album version L'Album was released as a solo single by Dania, labeled as "Dania, A 20 Fingers Production".)	—	—	—	—	—	—	—	—	—	—		20 Fingers/L'Album
1995	"I'm in Love" (A' Lisa B) (Note: "I'm in Love" of the French album version L'Album was released as a solo single by A' Lisa B, labeled as "A' Lisa B, A 20 Fingers Production".)	—	—	—	—	—	—	—	—	—	—		20 Fingers/L'Album
1995	"Praying for an Angel" (Rochelle) (Note: "Praying for an Angel" of the French album version L'Album was released as a solo single by Rochelle, labeled as "Rochelle, A 20 Fingers Production".)	—	—	—	—	—	—	—	—	—	—		20 Fingers/L'Album
1995	"Position #9" (Nerada) (Note: "Position #9" of the French album version L'Album was released as a solo single by Nerada, labeled as "Nerada, A 20 Fingers Production".)	—	—	—	—	—	—	—	—	—	—		20 Fingers/L'Album
"—" denotes releases that did not chart

=== Promotional singles ===
Year	Title	Peak chart positions	Album
Year	Title	FRA	Album
1995	"Don't Laugh But Lick It" (with Winx and Roula) (Note: "Don't Laugh But Lick It" is a mashup of "Lick It" by 20 Fingers feat. Roula and "Don't Laugh" by Winx.)	—	Non-album singles
1996	"Megamix"	44	Non-album singles
"—" denotes releases that did not chart

=== Album productions ===
- 1995: Max-A-Million – "Take Your Time"
- 1996: Gillette – "Shake Your Money Maker"

=== Single productions ===
- 1994: Max-A-Million – "Fat Boy"
- 1995: Max-A-Million – "Take Your Time (Do It Right)"
- 1995: Max-A-Million – "Sexual Healing"
- 1995: Max-A-Million – "Everybody's Groovin'"
- 1996: Katrina – "Push, Push"
- 1996: Gillette – "Shake Your Money Maker"
- 1996: Gillette – "Do Fries Go with That Shake?"
- 1997: Gillette – "Bounce"
- 2000: Gillette – "Sex Tonight"
- 2000: La Rissa – "Someone to Love Me"
- 2002: Eyra Gail – "Someone to Love"
- 2003: Angelina – "Gifted"

=== Music videos ===
- 1994: "Short Dick Man" (featuring Gillette)
- 1995: "Lick It" (featuring Roula)
- 1995: "Mr. Personality" (featuring Gillette)
- 1995: "Sex Machine" (featuring Katrina)
