= The Americanos =

American EDM trio

- Origin: Los Angeles, California, U.S.
- Genres: Progressive house; EDM trap
- Years active: 2012–present
- Members: DJ Felli Fel; Louie Rubio; Lex Larson

The Americanos are an American electronic dance music DJ trio based in Los Angeles consisting of DJ Felli Fel, Lex Larson and Louie Rubio.

== Background ==
Felli Fel, a veteran DJ and radio host, formed the group alongside Lex Larson and Louie Rubio. They have collaborated with several notable hip-hop artists such as Tyga, Lil Jon, Ty Dolla $ign, French Montana, Lil Yachty and Juicy J.

== History ==
=== 2015 ===
On 14 August 2015, they released their debut single "BlackOut" featuring Lil Jon, Juicy J & Tyga. The single was featured on the We Are Your Friends movie soundtrack and in the movie Office Christmas Party. The single debuted on Billboard's Dance/Electronic songs chart at 18th.

=== 2016 ===
On 11 July 2016, they released the single "In My Foreign" featuring Ty Dolla Sign, Nicky Jam, French Montana and Lil Yachty which was featured in the movie XXX: Return of Xander Cage.

== Discography ==
=== Singles ===
==== As lead artist ====
Title	Year	Peak chart positions	Album
Title	Year	US Dance	Album
"BlackOut" (featuring Lil Jon, Juicy J and Tyga)	2015	47	We Are Your Friends (Music From the Original Motion Picture)
"In My Foreign" (featuring Ty Dolla $ign, Nicky Jam, French Montana and Lil Yachty)	2016	—	xXx: Return of Xander Cage (Music From the Original Motion Picture)
"Everyday" (featuring DRAM and Kyle)	2017	—	Non-album single

==== As featured artist ====
Title	Year	Album
"Set Me Free" (Herizen Guardiola featuring Nile Rodgers & the Americanos)	2016	The Get Down (Original Soundtrack from the Netflix Original Series)
