= Krazy (Pitbull song) =

Single by Pitbull featuring Lil Jon

from the album Pitbull Starring in Rebelution and Fast & Furious
- Released: September 30, 2008
- Recorded: 2008
- Genre: Hip-hop; crunk
- Length: 3:48
- Label: The Orchard
- Songwriters: Armando Pérez; Jonathan Smith; Federico Franchi
- Producers: Federico Franchi; Lil Jon

Pitbull singles chronology
"Move Shake Drop" (2008)	"Krazy" (2008)	"Feel It" (2009)

Lil Jon singles chronology
"Get Buck in Here" (2007)	"Krazy" (2008)	"Let Me See the Booty" (2008)

Music video
- "Krazy" on YouTube

"Krazy" is a song by American rapper Pitbull featuring fellow American rapper Lil Jon. As the lead single from his fourth studio album Pitbull Starring in Rebelution and as a single from the Fast & Furious soundtrack, the song peaked at number 30 on the US Billboard Hot 100. The song samples Federico Franchi's 2007 song "Cream". Another version of "Krazy" that is played in San Diego, mentions all the sites in the area.

The instrumental of the song was also re-sampled in 2015 on the song "Cream", by Tujamo and Danny Avila, released on Spinnin' Records.

== Music video ==
The music video premiered on October 15, 2008. Fat Joe, Casely, LMFAO, Hurricane Chris and Rick Ross make cameo appearances in the video. The music video had been viewed more than 30 million times through Pitbull's official channel on YouTube.

The video was later removed and was then released onto Pitbull's official Vevo channel on October 15, 2010. It has received over 9 million views as of May 2020.

== Soundtrack usage ==
The original recording of the song was included on the original motion picture soundtrack for 2009's Fast & Furious 4. The Spanish version of the song was used in 2013's Turbo, and was included on the movie's official soundtrack, Turbo: Music from the Motion Picture.

== Track listings ==
Download single

1. "Krazy" (featuring Lil Jon) - 3:48

Download single (Spanish version)

1. "Krazy" (Spanish version) (featuring Lil Jon) - 3:48

== Charts ==
Chart (2008–2009)	Peak position
Canada (Canadian Hot 100)	70
Canada CHR/Top 40 (Billboard)	43
Switzerland (Schweizer Hitparade)	59
US Billboard Hot 100	30
US Bubbling Under R&B/Hip-Hop Singles (Billboard)	1
US Hot Rap Songs (Billboard)	11

== Certifications ==
Region	Certification	Certified units/sales
United States (RIAA)	Gold	500,000^{*}
^{*} Sales figures based on certification alone.
