= On the Attack and More =

On the Attack

Studio album by Gillette feat. 20 Fingers
- Released: December 20, 1994
- Genre: Dance; rock
- Label: ZYX Music
- Producer: Charlie Babie, Manny Mohr; J. J. Flores; Onofrio Lollino

Gillette chronology
On the Attack (1994)	Shake Your Money Maker (1996)

20 Fingers chronology
On the Attack and More (1994)	20 Fingers (1995)

Singles from On the Attack
- 1. "Short Dick Man" Released: August 31, 1994; 2. "Mr. Personality" Released: June 19, 1995; 3. "You're a Dog" Released: August 31, 1995

Singles from On the Attack and More
- 1. "Lick It" Released: February 13, 1995

Alternative cover
- Cover of the 20 Fingers release of the album

On the Attack is the debut studio album by American dance musician Gillette. It was produced by 20 Fingers. The album was initially released in late 1994 as Gillette's solo album. Later, on April 18, 1995, it was re-released in Poland and Germany as the debut album of 20 Fingers, credited as 20 Fingers featuring Gillette and retitled On the Attack and More.

== Background ==
On August 31, 1994, 20 Fingers released their controversial debut single "Short Dick Man" featuring vocalist and rapper Gillette on Zoo Entertainment/SOS Records. Following the song's massive global success, particularly in France where it was a number one hit for three weeks, the producers of 20 Fingers decided to release a full Gillette solo album, titled On the Attack, in various countries including Brazil, Canada, Scandinavia, Australia, Japan, Portugal, Chile, South Korea, and the U.S. In Poland and Germany, however, they released it as the debut studio album of 20 Fingers, credited as "20 Fingers feat. Gillette", retitled On the Attack and More, with altered cover art and a bonus track, the second single "Lick It", featuring vocals from Roula. 20 Fingers continued to release subsequent singles "Mr. Personality" and "You're a Dog" under the "20 Fingers feat. Gillette" brand in Poland and Germany, while releasing them as Gillette solo everywhere else.

== Critical reception ==
The Hartford Courant noted that "20 Fingers depends on a heavy guitar crunch and lapsed cheerleader chants—The Beastie Boys' '(You Gotta) Fight for Your Right (To Party!)' crossed with Toni Basil's 'Mickey!'" The Toronto Star called the album "an appealing mix of dance and rock styles that, given a chance, will transcend the novelty tag."

== Track listing ==
=== On the Attack ===
1. "Mr. Personality" – 3:30 (Charlie Babie, Manny Mohr)
2. "I'm on the Attack" – 3:25 (Mohr, J. J. Flores, Tammye Miller)
3. "Whatcha Gonna Do" – 3:17 (A'Lisa B., Mohr, Flores)
4. "Short, Short Man" (aka "Short Dick Man (Radio Mix)") – 3:17 (Babie, Mohr)
5. "Bad Boys" – 3:13 (Mohr, B., Onofrio Lollino)
6. "Wanna Wild Thing" – 3:18 (Flores, Babie, B.)
7. "You're a Dog" – 3:29 (Mohr, Lollino, B.)
8. "Coochie Dance" – 4:06 (Mohr, Flores, B.)
9. "Pay Back" – 3:33 (Mohr, Flores, B.)
10. "Move Too Fast" – 3:47 (Miller, Mohr, Babie, Flores)
11. "Short Dick Man" – 4:47 (Babie, Mohr)

=== On the Attack and More ===
12. "Lick It" – 4:14 (Babie, Mohr)
- The tracks on On the Attack and More are slightly louder and slightly sped up.

== Personnel ==
Musicians

- Gillette – vocals on tracks 1–11
- Roula – vocals on track 12
- Eric "Bam Bam" Cea – DJ/scratching on track 2
- Greg Suran, Lenny Vertucci – guitars

Production

- Produced by Charlie Babie, Manny Mohr, J. J. Flores and Onofrio Lollino
- Recorded and engineered by Charles Macak and Larry Sturm
- Mixed by Larry Sturm
- Mastered by Mark Richardson

== Charts ==
Chart performance for On the Attack and More
Chart (1995)	Peak position
Austrian Albums (Ö3 Austria)	24
German Albums (Offizielle Top 100)	26
