= Coming of Age (group) =

American R&B group

- Origin: Compton, California, United States
- Genres: R&B
- Instruments: Piano
- Years active: 1990–1995
- Labels: Zoo Entertainment (1993-1995)
- Members: Israel Spencer; Tao Kese; Terrance Quaites; Ivan; Maranthony

Coming of Age is a R&B quintet group that consist of Israel Spencer, Tao Kese, Terrance Quaites, Ivan Shaw and Maranthony Tabb. The group signed to Atlantic Records in the 1990s. Their self-titled debut album was released in 1993 and peaked in the top ten of the Billboard Top Heatseakers chart. Their debut single "Coming Home to Love" peaked at number twenty-seven on the US chart, their follow up in 1994 "Baby Be Still" peaked at number sixty-three.

In 1994, the group appeared with Tisha Campbell and De La Soul on Soul Train.

== Discography ==
=== Albums ===
List of studio albums, with selected chart positions
Title	Album details	Peak chart positions
Title	Album details	R&B/Hip-Hop
Coming of Age	Released: 1993; Label: Zoo Entertainment; Format: Digital download, CD	7
Comin' Correct	Released: 1995; Label: Zoo; Format: Digital download, CD	-

=== Singles ===
Year	Title	Album
1992	"Coming Home to Love"	Coming of Age
1994	"Baby Be Still"	Coming of Age
1995	"Compton Long Beach Style"	Compton Long Beach Style/Sparkle Maxi-Single
