= You Think You Know Her =

Single by Cause&Effect

from the album Another Minute
- B-side: "New World"
- Released: 1990
- Recorded: 1990
- Genre: Synth-pop
- Label: Exile/Sedona Recording Company/Zoo Entertainment
- Songwriter: Sean Rowley
- Producer: Sean Rowley

Cause&Effect singles chronology
"What Do You See?" (1990)	"You Think You Know Her" (1990)	"Another Minute" (1992)

"You Think You Know Her" is a song by American synth-pop band Cause&Effect. It was first released as a single in 1990, and was re-released in 1991 by Sedona Recording Company as a promo version. Tracks are identical to the Exile/Nastymix CD single released in 1990; only the remix titles have been renamed.

== Track listing ==
- 12" maxi-single Catalog #:NMR 74002-1

A. "You Think You Know Her" (The Deception Mix) (8:00)
A. "You Think You Know Her" (The Devious Dub) (7:10)
A. "You Think You Know Her" (The Deceptive Edit) (4:00)
B. "You Think You Know Her" (The Promiscuous Mix) (7:16)
B. "You Think You Know Her" (Promiscuous Instrumental) (4:51)
B. "You Think You Know Her" (Promiscuous Edit) (4:43)

- CD maxi-single Catalog #:NMR 74002-2
1. "You Think You Know Her" (7" Version) (4:35)
2. "You Think You Know Her" (The Deceptive Edit) (4:00)
3. "You Think You Know Her" (Promiscuous Edit) (4:43)
4. "You Think You Know Her" (The Deception Mix) (8:00)
5. "You Think You Know Her" (The Promiscuous Mix) (7:16)
6. "You Think You Know Her" (The Devious Dub) (7:10)
7. "You Think You Know Her" (Promiscuous Instrumental) (4:51)
- Cassette single Catalog #:72445-14025-4
1. "You Think You Know Her" (4:43)
2. "New World" (4:45)
- CD promo maxi-single Catalog #:ZP17043-2
1. "You Think You Know Her" (7" Remix Edit) (4:43)
2. "You Think You Know Her" (7" Edit) (4:38)
3. "You Think You Know Her" (Unfaithful Edit) (4:00)
4. "You Think You Know Her" (Unfaithful Mix) (8:00)
5. "You Think You Know Her" (Philanderers Mix) (7:16)
6. "You Think You Know Her" (Unfaithful Dub) (7:10)
7. "You Think You Know Her" (Philanderers Dub) (4:51)

== Charts ==
Chart (1992)	Peak Position
US Billboard Hot 100	38
US Hot Dance Music/Club Play (Billboard)	8
US Cash Box Top 100	29
