= Innermost Station =

Studio album by Cause & Effect
- Released: 1997
- Genre: Synthpop
- Length: 43:04
- Label: Liquefaction
- Producer: Cause & Effect

Cause & Effect chronology
Trip (1994)	Innermost Station (1997)	The Sunrise EP (2003)

Professional ratings
Review scores
Source	Rating
Allmusic	link

Innermost Station is Cause & Effect's third release, contains nine introspective tracks including the single "World Is Ours" . Soon after the recording of Innermost Station was completed, drummer Richard Shepherd amicably left the band to pursue personal interests. Released in 1997 under the Liquefaction label. The Album was re-released in 1999.

== Track listing ==
1. "Eclipse" – 5:01
2. "Generation" – 3:19
3. "World Is Ours" – 5:04
4. "Mars" – 4:10
5. "She's So Gone" – 4:47
6. "Radiolaria" – 2:31
7. "Real?" – 4:46
8. "Leaded" – 3:28
9. "Overdose" – 9:51

== Personnel ==
- Percussion, Drums [Drumset], Programmed By – Richard Shepherd (2)
- Synthesizer, Vocals, Programmed By – Keith Milo
- Vocals, Guitar, Programmed By – Robert Rowe*
- Written By, Producer, Recorded By, Mixed By – Cause & Effect
- Mastered By – Doug Doyle
- Mastered By [Premastering] – Rick Campbell, Shane Dillard
