= Get Buck in Here =

Single by DJ Felli Fel featuring Diddy, Akon, Ludacris and Lil Jon

from the album Go DJ!
- Released: October 4, 2007
- Recorded: 2007
- Genre: Hip-hop; crunk
- Length: 3:49
- Label: So So Def; Island Def Jam; Rock Hill
- Songwriters: James Reigart; Aliaune Thiam; Christopher Bridges; Jonathan Smith; Leroy Watson
- Producer: DJ Felli Fel

DJ Felli Fel singles chronology
"Get Buck in Here" (2007)	"Finer Things" (2008)

Diddy singles chronology
"Through the Pain (She Told Me)" (2007)	"Get Buck in Here" (2007)	"Diddy Rock" (2007)

Akon singles chronology
"Hypnotized" (2007)	"Get Buck in Here" (2007)	"Never Took the Time" (2007)

Ludacris singles chronology
"Slap" (2007)	"Get Buck in Here" (2007)	"Rock Star" (2007)

Lil Jon singles chronology
"The Anthem" (2007)	"Get Buck in Here" (2007)	"Krazy" (2008)

"Get Buck in Here" is a song by DJ Felli Fel. It features Diddy, Akon, Ludacris, and Lil Jon. The track was released on October 4, 2007.

The song features Diddy rapping the first and third verses, Ludacris on the second verse, Akon singing on the chorus, and Lil Jon on the outro. DJ Felli Fel produced the song and also sang backing vocals on the track.

"Get Buck in Here" was certified gold by the RIAA in April 2008. It is credited to being featured on the video game Midnight Club: Los Angeles.

== Music video ==
The video premiered on Yahoo Music on January 23, 2008. Cameo appearances included the Power 106 airstaff, DJ Khaled, Pitbull, Juicy J, Fat Joe, Jermaine Dupri, Kevin Hart, and DeRay Davis. The video was directed by Rage.

== Track listing ==
=== Promo CD single ===
#	Title	Time
1	"Get Buck in Here" (radio edit)	3:49
2	"Get Buck in Here" (explicit)	3:49
3	"Get Buck in Here" (instrumental)	3:28

== Charts ==
Chart (2007–2008)	Peak position
Canada Hot 100 (Billboard)	58
US Billboard Hot 100	41
US Hot R&B/Hip-Hop Songs (Billboard)	72
US Hot Rap Songs (Billboard)	13
US Pop Airplay (Billboard)	37
US Rhythmic Airplay (Billboard)	16
