= Course of Empire (band) =

American rock band (1988–1998)

- Course of Empire, 1994

Background information
- Origin: Dallas, Texas
- Genres: Alternative metal, industrial rock
- Years active: 1988–1998
- Labels: Carpe Diem; Zoo Entertainment; TVT
- Past members: Vaughn Stevenson; Mike Graff; Paul Semrad; Chad Lovell; Michael Jerome; Kyle Thomas; Anthony Headley
- Website: courseofempire.com

Course of Empire was an American alternative metal band from Dallas, Texas, active from 1988 to 1998. The band's final incarnation consisted of founding members vocalist Vaughn Stevenson, guitarist Mike Graff, and bassist Paul Semrad. Nearly every lineup of the band had two drummers, with Chad Lovell and Michael Jerome as the final duo. The band released three studio albums over ten years, with one each on the labels Carpe Diem, Zoo Entertainment (who also re-issued the band's debut album), and TVT Records.

== History ==
=== First studio album and major label signing (1988–1993) ===
Guitarist Mike Graff and drummer Anthony Headley had both attended Southern Methodist University in the 1980s. They had composed ambient music for various film projects. They eventually decided to expand their hobby into a full-fledged band, and by early 1988 the pair had brought in vocalist Vaughn Stevenson (who had moved to Texas from North Carolina) and bassist Paul Semrad. The band named themselves Course of Empire, which was taken from a series of paintings from the 1830s. Overall they were influenced by bands such as Ministry, Killing Joke, Joy Division, KMFDM, and others from the post-punk and industrial scenes. They played their first live show in July 1988. One year later, Headley witnessed a performance by the Kodo Drummers. He then brought back the concept of multiple drummers to Course of Empire; thus, the band enlisted Chad Lovell as their second drummer. Lovell had previously played in various cover bands and was seeking to create original material.

Around the same time, the band's local live shows had increased in size. One of the band's trademarks had consisted of passing around bongos and drumheads to the fans in attendance, but the practice was eventually discontinued since it became dangerous due to the increased fanbase. During the recording sessions for the band's debut album, Lovell had taken a hiatus from the band. Drummer Dave Abbruzzese was brought in to record the song "God's Jig", but then Lovell returned to the band shortly after. The band's debut album, simply titled Course of Empire, was released on Carpe Diem Records in 1990. After touring behind the album, Headley was dismissed from the band and was replaced by Kyle Thomas from Reverend Horton Heat. The band then signed with major label Zoo Entertainment, who re-issued the Course of Empire album nationally in early 1992. "Coming of the Century" was released as the band's first promotional single and music video.

After the tours which supported the Course of Empire re-issue, Thomas left the band and Michael Jerome joined as his replacement. In 1993, Course of Empire released the single "Infested" in anticipation of their second album. The single featured two new songs, "Joy" and "Let's Have a War" (a cover of a song by Fear), as well as a "Darwin Goodman" remix of "Infested". The name was taken from Darwin (naturalist/evolutionary scientist Charles Darwin) and Goodman (legendary big band clarinetist Benny Goodman).

=== Continued recording and label shifts (1993–1996) ===
The band released their second album, Initiation, on Zoo Entertainment in 1994. The physical CD had notably featured three hidden tracks on various spots of the release. "White Vision Blowout" and the aforementioned "Infested" were released as singles to promote the album. They toured behind the album with the likes of Prong, Sister Machine Gun, Machines of Loving Grace, and Stabbing Westward. In 1995, producer John Fryer, known for producing acts such as Nine Inch Nails and Depeche Mode, was tapped to produce their third record, as it featured more electronic-edged material. Around the same time, Course of Empire received an advance for their next album from Zoo Entertainment, but the band instead used it to build their own recording facility. In 1996, the band's song "Copious" (off of the Course of Empire album) appeared on the soundtrack to the film The Pompatus of Love. Soon after, the band found support in Dallas radio personality and In the Studio host Redbeard, who promoted the band's third album weeks ahead of release on Dallas radio station Q102, including heavy airplay of "New Maps", which was scheduled to be the lead single.

After a series of financial struggles, Zoo Entertainment drastically reduced their staff by early 1996. The label subsequently halted their daily operations in July 1996, just one month before Course of Empire's third album was due to be released. TVT Records signed the band by December 1996 after working out the licensing terms with BMG for the rights to the then-upcoming album and the previous Initiation record. At TVT's request, the band recorded additional tracks with Lovell as producer. The new tracks were mixed in Hollywood at Larrabee Studios North with Dave Bianco at the helm. Some previous tracks were also remixed by Bianco.

=== Final release and disbandment (1996–1998) ===
Course of Empire's third album Telepathic Last Words, originally mastered by Bob Ludwig for the Zoo Entertainment release, was remastered by Howie Weinberg in September 1997 and was finally released in January 1998, almost two years after its original completion. As part of the new deal, the scheduled national lead single was changed from "New Maps" to "The Information". "The Information" was included on the soundtrack for the 1998 film Dark City. A music video was also produced featuring scenes from the movie and was aired on MTV at the time of the movie's premiere. The band received favorable press in the form of a two-page cover story in a local alternative weekly news magazine, the Dallas Observer, as well as mentions in Spin and trade publications; however, a lack of promotion by the record company prevented the song from seeing a wide release on modern rock playlists across the United States. "The Information" was picked up by Q102 after the success of "New Maps" on Redbeard's show, but failed to gain traction and was dropped from the playlist by 1998. "Kaptain Kontrol" was also released as a promotional single.

The band supported the album by touring with 2wo, an industrial rock project headed by Rob Halford (Judas Priest) alongside John 5 (Marilyn Manson), Ray Riendeau (Machines of Loving Grace), and James Woolley (Nine Inch Nails). Less than two weeks after the tour started, 2wo had cancelled the remaining dates. Course of Empire also opened for The Sisters of Mercy in Los Angeles that spring. The group disbanded after ten years together due to frustration with the overall label management, the aforementioned tour cancellation, and the lack of a proper A&R representative. Their final show was in July 1998 at Trees in the Deep Ellum area of Dallas, with Caulk and Doosu as the show's openers.

=== Following years ===
In 2004, Graff and Martin Baird at Verge Music Works recording studio mixed the still-existing 24 tracks of the final performance at Trees and personally financed and self-released the tracks, titled Phone Calls From the Dead. A DVD of the band was also self-released that same year, titled Hiss. In 2008, a double-album of demos was self-released, simply titled Initiation Demos. In 2013, Early C.O.E. & Telepathic Last Show was self-released, which consisted of demos from the band's early years and also the remainder of the aforementioned Trees live show from 1998.

After Course of Empire split in 1998, Jerome and Graff collaborated with Van Eric Martin to form the group Halls of the Machine, who released their debut album, Atmospheres for Lovers and Sleepers, in 2001. The band released their second album All Tribal Dignitaries in 2017.

In 2019, it was revealed that Lovell had experienced a fall that left him with a traumatic brain injury. To help with medical costs, his former bandmates in Course of Empire decided to release an archival album entitled Fields of Discipline, which consisted of two-track demos recorded by the band in 1989. The material was previously unreleased up to that point. A Dallas listening party and drum jam occurred on October 25, 2021, in support of Lovell.

Another benefit for Lovell commenced on November 11, 2022, in Fort Worth, Texas. Toadies had headlined the event while an auction was held as a fundraiser. Around the same time, it was announced that there were plans to issue Course of Empire's second album Initiation on vinyl for the first time, which was eventually released in May 2023. The band's debut album, Course of Empire, was issued on vinyl for the first time as well in late 2024, by Carpe Diem. A few months into 2026, Telepathic Last Words was reissued on vinyl; thus, all three of the band's albums had ultimately reached the vinyl format (they were only released on CD and cassette in the 1990s).

Lovell died on July 21, 2026. For over five years, due to his head injury, he was receiving constant care and was residing at assisted living facilities.

== Members ==
- Vaughn Stevenson – vocals (1988–1998)
- Mike Graff – guitar (1988–1998)
- Paul Semrad – bass (1988–1998)
- Anthony Headley – drums (1988–1991)
- Chad Lovell – drums (1989–1998); died 2026
- Kyle Thomas – drums (1991–1993)
- Michael Jerome – drums (1993–1998)

== Discography ==
=== Albums ===
- 1990: Course of Empire (Carpe Diem Records) (Note: The album was reissued by Zoo Entertainment in 1992.)
- 1994: Initiation (Zoo Entertainment)
- 1998: Telepathic Last Words (TVT Records)

=== Compilations ===
- 2004: Phone Calls From the Dead (Live album/released on Lust)
- 2004: Hiss (DVD/Self-released)
- 2008: Initiation Demos (Demo album/Self-released)
- 2013: Early C.O.E. & Telepathic Last Show (Live album and studio tracks/Self-released)
- 2021: Fields of Discipline (Previously unreleased 1989 album/released on IDBLM)

=== Singles ===
- 1992: "Coming of the Century"
- 1993: "Infested"
- 1994: "White Vision Blowout"
- 1997: "The Information"
- 1998: "Kaptain Kontrol"
- 2021: "Thrust"
