= DJ Felli Fel =

American DJ (born 1970)

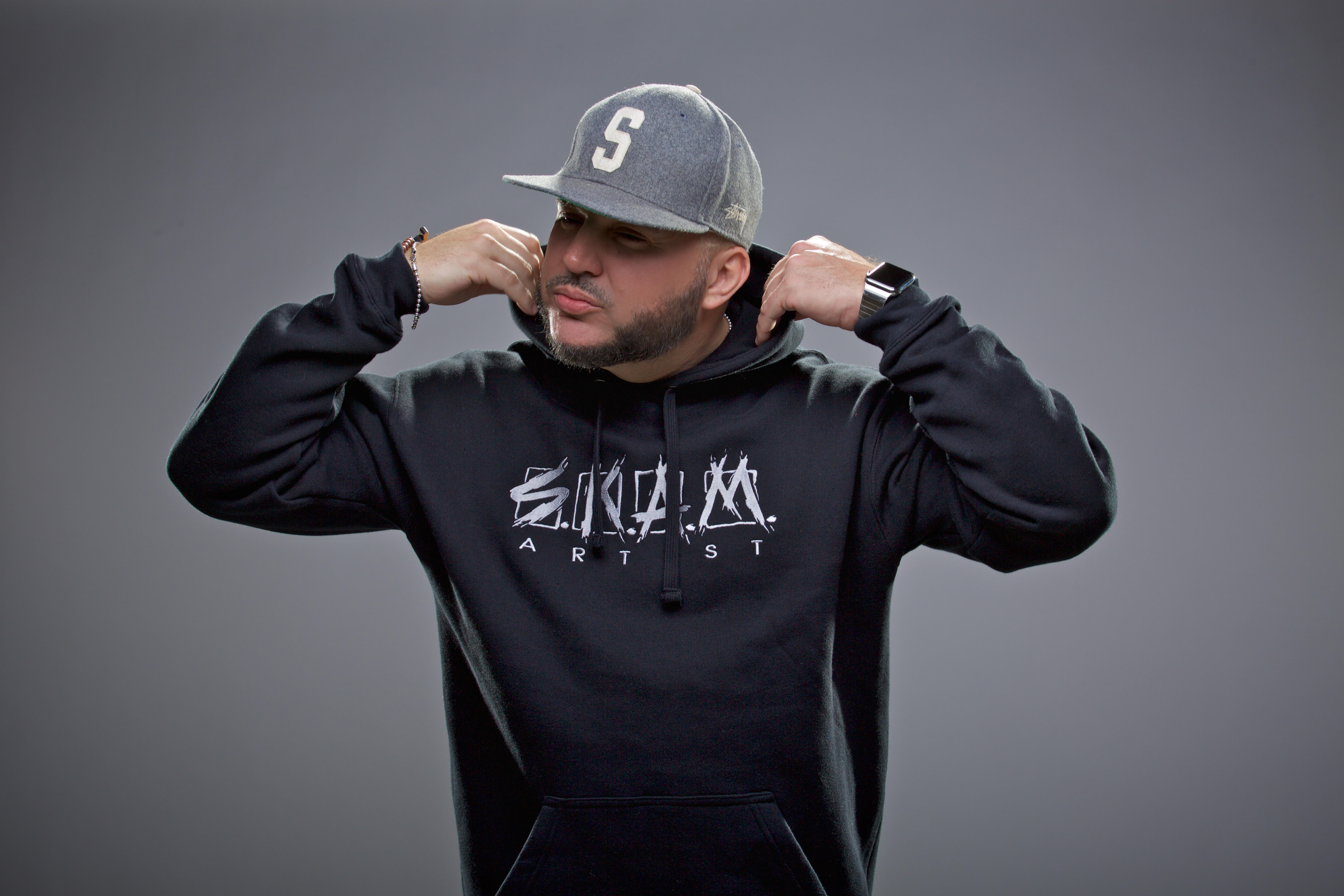
- DJ Felli Fel in 2016

Background information
- Born: James Andrew Reigart; September 3, 1970 (age 55); Rock Hill, South Carolina, U.S.
- Origin: Dallas, Texas, U.S.
- Genres: Hip-hop; electro hop; hip house
- Occupations: Disc jockey; record producer
- Years active: 1996–present
- Labels: Def Jam; So So Def; Rock Hill
- Member of: The Americanos; The Heavy Hitters DJs
- Website: fellifel.com

James Andrew Reigart (born September 3, 1970), better known by his stage name DJ Felli Fel, is an American DJ and record producer. He is also a member of the Americanos and the Heavy Hitters DJs.

His 2007 debut single, "Get Buck in Here" (featuring Diddy, Akon, Ludacris and Lil Jon), peaked at number 41 on the Billboard Hot 100. Its success led him to sign with So So Def Recordings, in a joint venture with The Island Def Jam Music Group. His 2008 single, "Finer Things" (featuring Kanye West, Jermaine Dupri, Fabolous and Ne-Yo), peaked atop the Bubbling Under Hot 100 chart, and his 2009 single, "Feel It" (featuring T-Pain, Sean Paul, Flo Rida and Pitbull), entered the Hot Rap Songs.

== Biography ==
Reigart was born in Rock Hill, South Carolina, and grew up in Atlanta, Los Angeles, and Dallas. While a teenager in Dallas, he began spinning turntables for house parties. His radio career began on Dallas radio station K104 and Waco, Texas Spanish-language station KHCK. Later, he joined the Los Angeles hip-hop station Power 106. At Power 106, he hosts the Felli Fel Show on Saturday evenings.

He had a cameo role as himself in the 2003 film Malibu's Most Wanted. In 2007, he signed with Island Def Jam/So So Def. His debut album for the label is tentatively titled Go DJ!. Singles for the album included "Finer Things" with Jermaine Dupri, Kanye West, Fabolous, and Ne-Yo; "Get Buck in Here" with Diddy, Akon, Lil Jon, and Ludacris; and "Feel It" with Sean Paul, Pitbull, Flo Rida, and T-Pain. DJ Felli Fel was also featured on the soundtrack of the game Midnight Club: Los Angeles, with his song "Get Buck in Here". He released the single "Boomerang" featuring Pitbull, Akon, and Jermaine Dupri. The track has been remixed by DJ Vice in 2011.

On April 22, 2013, he released the single "Reason To Hate", which features singer Ne-Yo and rappers Tyga and Wiz Khalifa, on iTunes. It was co-produced by Ned Cameron.

Felli is currently a member of The Americanos, a DJ group from Los Angeles whose singles "BlackOut" and "In My Foreign" have been featured in films ("BlackOut" was featured in We Are Your Friends and Office Christmas Party and "In My Foreign" was featured in XXX: Return of Xander Cage).

== Discography ==
=== Studio albums ===
Title	Details
Go DJ!	Unreleased; Label: Rock Hill Records, Island Urban, Def Jam, So So Def; Format: CD, digital download

=== Filmography ===
School Dance as Himself

Def Jam Fight for NY as Announcer

Malibu's Most Wanted as Himself

== Singles ==
=== As lead artist ===
List of singles as lead artist, with selected chart positions and certifications, showing year released and album name
Title	Year	Peak chart positions					Certifications	Album
Title	Year	US	US R&B	US Rap	CAN	NLD	Certifications	Album
"Get Buck in Here" (featuring Diddy, Akon, Ludacris and Lil Jon)	2007	41	72	13	58	—	RIAA: Gold	Non-album singles
"Finer Things" (featuring Kanye West, Jermaine Dupri, Fabolous and Ne-Yo)	2008	101	80	8	—	—		Non-album singles
"Feel It" (featuring T-Pain, Sean Paul, Flo Rida and Pitbull)	2009	—	—	23	—	40		Non-album singles
"I Wanna Get Drunk" (featuring Three 6 Mafia, Lil Jon and Fatman Scoop)	2010	—	—	—	—	—		Non-album singles
"Boomerang" (featuring Akon, Pitbull and Jermaine Dupri)	2011	—	—	—	—	34		Non-album singles
"It's Your Birthday B!tch" (featuring Lil Jon and Jessie Malakouti)	2012	—	—	—	—	—		Non-album singles
"Reason to Hate" (featuring Ne-Yo, Tyga and Wiz Khalifa)	2013	—	58	21	—	—		Non-album singles
"Have Some Fun" (featuring Cee-Lo, Juicy J and Pitbull)	2014	—	—	—	—	—		Non-album singles
"—" denotes a recording that did not chart or was not released in that territory.

=== As featured artist ===
List of singles as featured artist, with selected chart positions, showing year released and album name
Title	Year	Peak chart positions	Album
Title	Year	US	Album
"Do You Like...?" (Bosko featuring DJ Felli Fel)	2006	—	That Fire
"I'm Toe Up (Remix)" (Problem featuring DJ Felli Fel, DJ Quik, Kurupt, Terrace Martin and Snoop Dogg)	2008	—	Non-album singles
"Diamonds & Patron" (Tino Cochino featuring Paul Wall, DJ Felli Fel and DJ Class)	2009	—	Non-album singles
"BlackOut" (as one third of the Americanos) (featuring Lil Jon, Tyga and Juicy J)	2015	—	Non-album singles
"In My Foreign" (as one third of the Americanos) (featuring Lil Yachty, Nicky Jam, French Montana, and Ty Dolla Sign)	2016	—	Non-album singles
"—" denotes a recording that did not chart or was not released in that territory.

=== Production credits ===
- 2001 "I Like Them Girls (Power Mix)" (Tyrese featuring Bosco)
- 2001 "World Wide (Remix)" (Outlawz featuring 2Pac and T-Low)
- 2002 "A Piece of Me" (Luniz featuring Fat Joe)
- 2003 "Bomba" (Felli Fel from the motion picture Malibu's Most Wanted)
- 2004 "Back it up" (Young Rome)
- 2004 "It's All Right" (Guerilla Black)
- 2004 "Intro" (Cassidy)
- 2006 "On Bail" (Xzibit featuring T-Pain, The Game and Daz Dillinger)
- 2006 "That Ain't Right" (Sean Kingston)
- 2006 "Like That" (Noelle featuring Felli Fel from the motion picture Employee of the Month)
- 2007 "Don't Stop" (Baby Bash featuring Keith Sweat)
- 2007 "Take You There" (Sean Kingston)
- 2008 "Live It Up! (DJ Felli Fel Remix)" (Roscoe Umali featuring E-40 and Bobby V)
- 2008 "Died in Your Arms" (Smitty featuring T-Pain)
- 2008 "Died in Your Arms" (Remix) (Smitty featuring T-Pain, Junior Reid and Rick Ross)
- 2008 "Cinematic" (Jessi Malay featuring DJ Felli Fel)
- 2008 "The Money" (R. Kelly featuring Fat Joe)
- 2008 "Jolly Rancher" (Tino Cochino)
- 2009 "Diamonds & Patron" (Tino Cochino featuring Paul Wall, DJ Felli Fel and DJ Class)
- 2009 "Dizzy" (Frankie J)
- 2009 "One Night" (New Boyz)
- 2009 "Loaded" (Jeremy Green featuring Ya Boy)
- 2012 "Dirty Martini" (Collins Pennie)
- 2013 "Lighters" (50 Cent featuring Chris Brown)

== Awards ==
Year	Group	Award	Result
2008	BET Hip Hop Award	DJ of the Year	Nominated
