= Mr. Personality (song) =

Single by Gillette/20 Fingers featuring Gillette

from the album On the Attack
- B-side: "Mr. Personality (Ugly Mix)"
- Released: May 19, 1995
- Genre: House; dance-pop
- Length: 3:30
- Label: ZYX
- Songwriters: Charlie Babie; Manny Mohr
- Producers: Charlie Babie; Manny Mohr

Gillette singles chronology
"Short Dick Man" (1994)	"Mr. Personality" (1995)	"You're a Dog" (1995)

20 Fingers singles chronology
"Lick It" (1995)	"Mr. Personality" (1995)	"You're a Dog" (1995)

Music video
- "Mr. Personality" on YouTube

"Mr. Personality" is a song recorded by American singer and rapper Gillette, produced by 20 Fingers and released in May 1995, by ZYX Music, as the second single from Gillette's debut solo album, On the Attack (1994).

== Background ==
The song has been released as Gillette's second single from her debut solo album On the Attack worldwide, while in Poland and Germany, it has been released as 20 Fingers' third single credited as "20 Fingers featuring Gillette" from their debut album On the Attack and More. The track reached the top 20 in Belgium. However, sales were lower than 20 Fingers' previous hits "Short Dick Man" and "Lick It". The song also charted in Germany, New Zealand and Switzerland.

== Ugly Mix ==
The B-Side of "Mr. Personality" is the "Ugly Mix" of the song. Technically about the same content, it is completely a different song with different beat arrangement, recorded vocals, and different lyric text and refrain. The structure of the Ugly Mix follows the style of 20 Fingers and Gillette's hit song "Short Dick Man", which has a dance beat instead of a hip hop beat and a rock beat, with minimalistic vocals, the rap verses completely removed and replaced by spoken repeatings such as in the refrain, where it was "Do, Don't, Don't, Don't want no ugly mothersucker" or "I, I, I, I don't think so, I don't think so" ("Eeny, weeny, teeny, weeny" or "Don't, Don't, Don't, Do Do, Don't, Don't, Don't" as it was in "Short Dick Man").

== Track listings ==
- CD maxi
1. "Mr. Personality" (Radio Mix) – 3:30
2. "Mr. Personality" (Euro Edit) – 3:26
3. "Mr. Personality" (Ugly Mix) – 4:02
4. "Mr. Personality" (Ugly Underground Mix) – 5:11
5. "Mr. Personality" (Gumbo Mix) – 4:32
6. "Mr. Personality" (Album Version) – 3:30
- 12" maxi
1. "Mr. Personality" (Ugly Mix) – 4:02
2. "Mr. Personality" (J.J.'s Euro Mix) – 6:09
3. "Mr. Personality" (Gumbo Mix) – 4:32
4. "Mr. Personality" (Ugly Underground Mix) – 5:11
5. "Mr. Personality" (Radio Mix) – 3:30
6. "Mr. Personality" (Album Version) – 3:44

== Charts ==
Weekly chart performance for "Mr. Personality"
Chart (1995)	Peak position
Australia (ARIA)	80
Belgium (Ultratop 50 Wallonia)	19
Canada Top Singles (RPM)	55
Canada Dance/Urban (RPM)	11
El Salvador (UPI)	5
Europe (European Dance Radio)	20
Germany (GfK)	22
Iceland (Íslenski Listinn Topp 40)	33
New Zealand (Recorded Music NZ)	32
Switzerland (Schweizer Hitparade)	36
US Billboard Hot 100	42
US Maxi-Singles Sales (Billboard)	37
US Cash Box Top 100	41
