= Trip (Cause and Effect album) =

Studio album by Cause and Effect
- Released: 1994
- Genre: Synthpop
- Length: 48:05
- Label: BMG
- Producer: Martyn Phillips

Cause and Effect chronology
Another Minute (1992)	Trip (1994)	Innermost Station (1997)

Professional ratings
Review scores
Source	Rating
AllMusic	3/5 stars

Trip is the second album from the synthpop act Cause and Effect. It is dedicated to the memory of Sean Rowley. The album includes the song "It's Over Now," which reached number seven on the Billboard Modern Rock Tracks chart. It was released in 1994 under the BMG label.

== Track listing ==
1. "It's Over Now" – 4:09
2. "Inside Out" – 4:20
3. "Alone" – 4:29
4. "In Shakespeare's Garden" – 4:55
5. "You Are The One" – 4:58
6. "Soul Search" – 4:42
7. "Stone Girl" – 4:01
8. "She Said" – 4:52
9. "Sinking" – 5:07
10. "Crash" – 6:13

== Personnel ==
- Robert Rowe – vocals, guitars
- Keith Milo – synths, programming, vocals
- Richard Shepherd – drums, programming, vocals
- Produced by Martyn Phillips
