= Another Minute =

Single by Cause&Effect

from the album Another Minute
- B-side: "Unholy Day"
- Released: 1992
- Recorded: 1991
- Genre: Synth-pop
- Label: Sedona Recording Company
- Songwriters: Rob Rowe, Sean Rowley
- Producer: Sean Rowley

Cause&Effect singles chronology
"You Think You Know Her" (1991)	"Another Minute" (1992)	"Its Over Now" (1994)

"Another Minute" is a song by the American synth-pop band Cause&Effect. It was released as a single in 1992.

== Track listing ==
- 12" maxi-single Catalog #:72445-14035-1

A. "Another Minute" (Deep Sex Mix) (5:16)
A. "Another Minute" (Ragga Dub) (5:24)
A. "Another Minute" (Deep Sexstrumental) (5:14)
B. "Another Minute" (Practice Faith Mix) (6:08)
B. "Another Minute" (Effect Of Faith In Steve's Hands) (4:29)
B. "You Think You Know Her" (Unfaithful Mix) (8:00)

- CD maxi-single Catalog #:72445-14044-2
1. "Another Minute" (Radio Remix Edit) (3:42)
2. "Another Minute" (Radio Edit) (3:35)
3. "Another Minute" (Alternative Edit) (3:53)
4. "Another Minute" (Deep Sex Mix) (5:16)
5. "Another Minute" (Practice Faith Mix) (6:08)
6. "Another Minute" (Ragga Dub) (5:24)
7. "Another Minute" (The Drill Mix) (4:24)
8. "Unholy Day" (bonus track) (5:01)
- Cassette promo single Catalog #:ZADV0036-4
1. "Another Minute" (Alternative Radio)
2. "Unholy Day"
3. "Another Minute" (LP Version)
4. "Another Minute" (Drill Mix)
5. "Another Minute" (Deep Sex Mix)
6. "Another Minute" (Practice Faith Mix)
7. "Another Minute" (Ragga Dub)
8. "Another Minute" (Radio Remix Edit)
- 12" promo maxi-single Catalog #:ZP17077-1

A. "Another Minute" (Radio Remix Edit) (3:42)
A. "Another Minute" (Radio Edit) (3:35)
A. "Another Minute" (Alternative Radio Edit) (3:53)
A. "Another Minute" (Deep Sex Mix) (5:16)
B. "Another Minute" (Practice Faith Mix) (6:08)
B. "Another Minute" (Ragga Dub) (5:24)
B. "Another Minute" (The Drill Mix) (4:24)

- 12" promo maxi-single Catalog #:ZP17063-1

A. "Another Minute" (The Drill Mix) (4:24)
B. "Another Minute" (Another Effect Dub) (5:39)

- CD promo maxi-single Catalog #:ZP17064-2
1. "Another Minute" (Alternative Edit) (3:53)
2. "Unholy Day" (5:01)
3. "Another Minute" (Album Version) (3:35)
4. "Another Minute" (4:24)
5. "You Think You Know Her" (Unfaithful Mix) (8:00)

== Charts ==
Chart (1992)	Peak Position
US Billboard Hot 100	75
US Cash Box Top 100	70
