= Zoo Entertainment (record label) =

Defunct American record label

- Parent company: Bertelsmann Music Group (1991–1996); Volcano Entertainment (1996–1997); Sony Music Entertainment (back catalogue)
- Founded: 1990; 36 years ago
- Founder: Lou Maglia
- Defunct: 1997
- Status: Defunct (absorbed into Volcano)
- Distributor: Volcano
- Genre: Alternative rock
- Country of origin: United States
- Location: Los Angeles (1991–1996); New York City (1996–1997)

Zoo Entertainment was an American record label formed in 1990 by Lou Maglia. Zoo released three platinum records by the group Tool, as well as gold records by Green Jellÿ and Matthew Sweet. During the record company's early years, music industry executive George Daly was the label's original Vice President of A&R.

== History ==
The label was formed in 1990 by Lou Maglia, former president of Island Records. As early as 1993, Zoo was having financial difficulties. In November 1991, Zoo signed Los Angeles band Tool, and released their debut EP Opiate early the following year. The label wanted to market them as a heavy metal band, and insisted they only put their most aggressive material on the EP. In 1993, Zoo released Tool's full-length debut Undertow, and by September 1994 it was certified platinum for sales of a million copies. The record label also distributed Gamble & Huff's Philadelphia International Records for a short time. Being its distributor, the late Phyllis Hyman enjoyed a chart entry with "Don't Wanna Change The World," a song that was taken to US radio by radio promoter Jesus Garber, then a VP at Zoo; the single ultimately peaked at No. 59 on the Billboard R&B charts. In 1995, BMG reduced the staff at Zoo, foreshadowing problems for the label.

The label released Our Little Visionary, the 1996 debut album of Dogstar, founded by actor Keanu Reeves. However, by the following year Dogstar had been dropped from Zoo. In August 1996, BMG sold Zoo to Kevin Czinger's newly formed Volcano Entertainment. It began as a partnership between the two labels, and new albums continued to be released under the Zoo name in late 1996 and 1997. By the end of 1997 the Zoo name had been phased out, with the label's only releases that year being Matthew Sweet's Blue Sky on Mars and Free Mars by Lusk (a band founded by ex-Tool bassist Paul D'Amour). All of Zoo's artists were absorbed by the new Volcano imprint. Volcano went through changes and was eventually sold to the Zomba Label Group in the spring of 1998. When Zomba was purchased by BMG in 2002, any remaining Zoo artists were returned to the BMG fold. BMG's assets were sold in 2008 to Sony Corporation of America and the back catalog is now handled by Sony Music Group through Volcano.

== Artists ==
- 20 Fingers
- 7 Year Bitch
- Ajax
- Akinyele
- Alcohol Funnycar
- Bad Boys Blue
- Big Star
- Bleu
- Blue Train
- Calamity Jane
- Cause & Effect
- Clarence Clemons
- Coming Of Age
- Course of Empire
- Cosmic Travelers
- Crowbar
- Disturbance
- Dogstar
- Drive
- Flowerhead
- Gary Hoey
- Gillette
- Great White
- Green Jellÿ
- Hoodoo Gurus
- Kemelions
- Killers
- Killing Joke
- Little Feat
- Last Gentlemen
- Lazet Michaels
- Lusk
- Love Jones
- Matthew Sweet
- Max-A-Million
- Miss Alans
- Morpheus
- Nature
- N.F.B.
- Odds
- Oliver Who?
- Overlords
- Philip Bailey
- Phyllis Hyman
- Pood, Bhud, 'N' Pflug
- The Pooh Sticks
- Procol Harum
- Steve Pryor Band
- Street Mentality
- Red Square Black
- Replicants
- Rhythm Tribe
- Rosco Martinez
- Self
- Shaver
- Spelvins
- Tool
- Tung Twista
- Varga
- Voices
- Webb Wilder

== Discography ==
Artist	Album	Details
Odds	Neopolitan	Released: 1991
Mark Germino and the Sluggers	Radartown	Released: 1991
Peter Wells	Everything You Like Tries To Kill You	Released: 1991
Steve Pryor Band	Steve Pryor Band	Released: 1991
Webb Wilder	Doo Dad	Released: 1991
Procol Harum	The Prodigal Stranger	Released: 1991
Cause and Effect	Another Minute	Released: 1991
The Pooh Sticks	The Great White Wonder	Released: 1991
Matthew Sweet	Girlfriend	Released: 1991
Procol Harum	Chapter One: Turning Back The Page 1967-1991 (compilation)	Released: 1991
Rhythm Tribe	Sol Moderno	Released: 1991
Lazet Michaels	Too Strong	Released: 1991
Phyllis Hyman	Prime of My Life	Released: 1991
Green Jellÿ	Suxx! (EP)	Released: 1992
Killers	Murder One	Released: 1992
Oliver Who?	Shaka Who Who?	Released: 1992
Last Gentlemen	The World Behind Your Back	Released: 1992
Tool	Opiate (EP)	Released: 1992
Drive	Diablero	Released: 1992
African Unity	Volume One: Out Of The Flames	Released: 1992
Voices	Just the Beginning...	Released: 1992
Flowerhead	...Ka-Bloom!	Released: 1992
Matthew Sweet	Goodfriend	Released: 1992
Matthew Sweet	Girlfriend: The Superdeformed CD (EP)	Released: 1992
Tung Twista	Runnin' Off at da Mouth	Released: 1992
Rastine	Afrodisiac	Released: 1992
The Dells	I Salute You	Released: 1992
Matthew Sweet	Altered Beast	Released: 1993
Green Jellÿ	Cereal Killer Soundtrack	Released: 1993
Odds	Bedbugs	Released: 1993
Pooh Sticks	Million Seller	Released: 1993
Disturbance	We Come out at Night	Released: 1993
Tool	Undertow	Released: 1993
The Spelvins	Whichever Train Comes	Released: 1993
Bad Boys Blue	Bad Boys Blue	Released: 1993
Coming of Age	Coming of Age	Released: 1993
Loves Jones	Here's to the Losers	Released: 1993
Varga	Prototype	Released: 1994
Great White	Sail Away	Released: 1994
Rosco Martinez	Rosco Martinez	Released: 1994
Spade Ghetto Destruction	Spade Ghetto Destruction	Released: 1994
Ray Bailey	Satan's Horn	Released: 1994
The Overlords	All the Naked People	Released: 1994
Odds	Neopolitan	Released: 1991
Killing Joke	Pandemonium	Released: 1994
Green Jellÿ	333	Released: 1994
Roscoe Martinez	Aqui Estoy	Released: 1994
The Wailing Souls	Lives On	Released: 1994
Prairie Oyster	Only One Moon	Released: 1994
Tool	Sober: Tales from the Darkside (EP)	Released: 1994
Course of Empire	Initiation	Released: 1994
Matthew Sweet	Son of Altered Beast (EP)	Released: 1994
Philip Bailey	Philip Bailey	Released: 1994
The Miss Alans	Blusher	Released: 1994
Cause and Effect	Trip	Released: 1994
Red Square Black	Square (EP)	Released: 1994
Gillette	On the Attack and More	Released: 1994
Hoodoo Gurus	Crank	Released: 1994
Flowerhead	The People's Fuzz	Released: 1995
Paul Barrere	If the Phone Don't Ring	Released: 1995
Clarence Clemons	Peacemaker	Released: 1995
Shaver	Unshaven: Shaver Live At Smith's Olde Bar	Released: 1995
Nature	Nature	Released: 1995
Various Artists	Mad Love (The Original Motion Picture Soundtrack)	Released: 1995
20 Fingers	20 Fingers	Released: 1995
Ajax	Ex-Junkie (EP)	Released: 1995
Matthew Sweet	100% Fun	Released: 1995
Love Jones	Powerful Pain Relief	Released: 1995
Great White	Stage	Released: 1995
Replicants	Replicants	Released: 1995
G-Mo	Ballin' for Life	Released: 1995
John Frizzell	VR.5	Released: 1995
Max-A-Million	Take Your Time	Released: 1995
Neal Casal	Fade Away Diamond Time	Released: 1995
Ajax	Aphrodite (EP)	Released: 1995
Self	Subliminal Plastic Motives	Released: 1995
Tool	Ænima	Released: 1996
Various Artists	The Pompatus of Love: The Original Motion Picture Soundtrack	Released: 1996
Killing Joke	Democracy	Released: 1996
Gillette	Shake Your Money Maker	Released: 1996
Little Feat	Live from Neon Park	Released: 1996
Dogstar	Quattro Formaggi (EP)	Released: 1996
Hoodoo Gurus	Blue Cave	Released: 1996
Dogstar	Our Little Visionary	Released: 1996
Matthew Sweet	Blue Sky on Mars	Released: 1997
Lusk	Free Mars	Released: 1997

== See also ==
- List of record labels
- Volcano Entertainment
- Freeworld Entertainment
