= Cause and Effect (band) =

American electronic/synthpop band (1990–2020)

Cause & Effect
- Origin: Sacramento, California, United States
- Genres: Synthpop, dance-pop, electronic
- Years active: 1990–2020
- Labels: Liquefaction; Zoo Entertainment; BMG; Exile; Sedona Recording Company
- Spinoffs: Whitewaits, VH x RR
- Past members: Robert Rowe; Keith Milo; Sean Rowley; Richard Shepherd
- Website: www.causeandeffect.com

Cause & Effect (abbreviated as C&E) was an American electronic/synthpop band from Sacramento, California, originally consisting of Robert Rowe (also known as Rob Rowe) and Sean Rowley. They are best known by their US minor hits "You Think You Know Her" (1990), "Another Minute" (1992) and "It's Over Now" (1994).

== History ==
=== Early years ===
Cause & Effect (C&E) were formed in Sacramento, California, United States, consisting of founding members vocalist/guitarist Rob Rowe and vocalist/keyboardist Sean Rowley (August 24, 1969 – November 12, 1992). They originally released their debut in 1990 as a self-titled album on minor label Exile Records. C&E was subsequently picked up by BMG Music subsidiary, Zoo Entertainment, and a reworked version of their album was released in 1991 as Another Minute. Adding drummer Richard Shepherd, the band headed out on tour in late 1992.

=== Death of Rowley ===
Just as the fortunes of the band looked promising, co-founding member Sean Rowley died on November 12, 1992, while on tour as the opening act for Information Society. Rowley died during the soundcheck for the tour's seventh show at Glam Slam, a club opened in 1989 by musician/songwriter Prince in Minneapolis, Minnesota. The cause of death was reported as a result of heart failure brought on by a severe asthma attack. He was 23. The group cancelled the remainder of their tour and returned home to Sacramento.

A period of contemplation followed. The band was then invited to perform at the sold-out KROQ Acoustic Christmas Show. The audience's reception encouraged Rowe to continue the band. The Rowe-penned acoustic song "Hollow" was included on a compilation by their record company, Zoo Entertainment. The song was dedicated to Rowley.

=== New members ===
Afterwards, Rowe and Shepherd decided to continue the band's efforts with keyboardist Keith Milo. In 1994, the re-formed band released their second album, Trip, which was received with critical acclaim. The album spawned the single "It's Over Now", a number 7 hit on the Billboard Modern Rock Tracks chart and the band's second single to chart on the Billboard Hot 100, reaching number 67 in August 1994. Singles were also released for the songs "Alone" and "Inside Out", but both failed to make a dent in the charts.

=== Innermost Station ===
After parent company BMG pulled funding and distribution, C&E's indie label Zoo Entertainment folded in 1995. Instead of searching for another major label deal, C&E decided to utilize alternative methods of distribution and simultaneously established their official online website and label, Liquefaction, in 1996. The band released their third album, Innermost Station, in 1997 (re-released in 1999). A digital single of "World Is Ours", containing two remixes was released via their website around this time. The release of the album coincided with the departure of drummer Richard Shepherd from the group.

=== The Sunrise EP ===
Rowe and Milo released The Sunrise EP in 2003, which featured the single "Into the Light" which became the band's fifth single to chart in the Billboard club charts, reaching No. 20 in mid-2004. "Into the Light" was released as a digital only iTunes single with seven club remixes (most notably by Dave Audé).

=== Artificial Construct ===
In breaking with tradition, Rowe and Milo released their fifth studio album Artificial Construct, as a three-part series to be released as individual EPs over the course of 2011. Artificial Construct Part One was released on June 6, 2010. Part Two was released July 8, 2011. As of November 2014, Part Three of Artificial Construct has yet to be released as the band is on hiatus while Rowe works on his side project, Whitewaits.

=== Hiatus and split ===
A message from the band on posted on its Facebook Page read: "C&E UPDATE: Dear friends, After a 20-year "monogamous" musical relationship, we've decided to shake things up a bit in 2013 and try something different. We're putting the release of AC3 on hold to focus on some exciting individual side projects. But don't worry, we still love each other and we definitely love you for your continued support - Stay tuned in the coming weeks for more details! Cheers, Rob & Keith #Hiatus".

In April 2020, the band announced via their Facebook page that Cause and Effect would no longer be making music together.

=== Rob Rowe ===
Rowe has since released solo material under the name Whitewaits and along with producer Von Hertzog under the name VH x RR.

== Discography ==
=== Albums ===
- Cause & Effect (1990) (Out of print)
- Another Minute (1992)
- Trip (1994)
- Innermost Station (1997) re-released (1999)
- The Sunrise EP (2003)
- Artificial Construct (Part One) (April 2010)
- Artificial Construct (Part Two) (July 8, 2011)

=== Singles ===
- "What Do You See" (1990)
- "You Think You Know Her" (1990)
- "You Think You Know Her" – re-release (1991)
- "What Do You See" – re-release (1992)
- "Another Minute" (1992)
- "It's Over Now" (1994)
- "Alone" - Label Promo Only (1994)
- "Inside Out" – Label Promo Only (1994)
- "World Is Ours" (digital single) (1999)
- "Ophelia" (digital single only released for the credits of the film Shriek If You Know What I Did Last Friday the Thirteenth) (2000)
- "Into the Light" (2004)
- "Happy?" – Dirty 8VA Mix (Digital single) (2010)

=== Compilation appearances ===
- Zoo's South Paw - "Hollow"

== Popular culture ==
One of the band's songs, "Ophelia", was featured in the 2000 film Shriek If You Know What I Did Last Friday the Thirteenth.

In 2020, Crosses (a side project from Deftones singer Chino Moreno) released a cover of Cause & Effect's "The Beginning of the End".
