= The Course of Empire (history book) =

1952 book by Bernard DeVoto

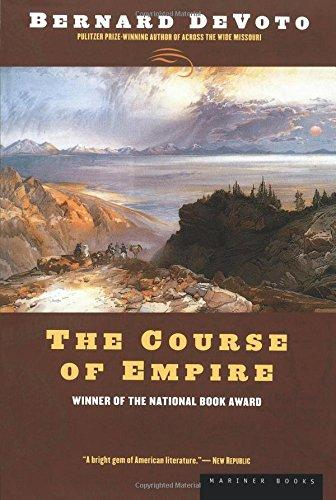
- Author: Bernard DeVoto
- Language: English
- Genre: Non-fiction]]
- Publisher: Houghton Mifflin Harcourt
- Publication date: 1952
- Publication place: United States
- ISBN: 978-0-395-92498-3
- Preceded by: Across the Wide Missouri

The Course of Empire is a 1952 book by the American journalist and historian Bernard DeVoto. It is the third volume of a trilogy that includes The Year of Decision (1942) and Across the Wide Missouri (1947).

== Description ==
The Course of Empire is a history of the exploration of Western North America. The book chronicles several centuries of searching for a Northwest Passage, a water route that would connect the settlements of the Atlantic seaboard with trading markets in India and China. The book proceeds in unconventional narrative fashion, focusing on how centuries of geographical study of the continent, especially its hydrology, shaped the exploration of the West, and eventually a United States that reached from coast to coast.

== Reception ==
The book was widely-praised, called "a permanent contribution to history" by Kirkus.

The book was awarded a National Book Award in 1953.
