= Gillette (singer) =

American singer and rapper

- Born: Sandra Navarro Gillette; September 16, 1974 (age 51); New Jersey, U.S.
- Origin: Romeoville, Illinois, U.S.
- Genres: Dance, hip hop
- Occupations: Singer, rapper
- Years active: 1994–2005

Sandra Navarro Gillette (born September 16, 1974), known mononymously as Gillette, is a retired Mexican-American singer and rapper active in the mid-1990s to the early 2000s. She is best known for her 1994 worldwide hit "Short Dick Man", a song released alongside the production team 20 Fingers.

== Life and career ==
=== 1974–1994: Early life and "Short Dick Man" ===
Sandra Gillette was born in New Jersey as Sandra Navarro to a Puerto Rican mother and Mexican father and grew up in Chicago and Houston, singing and rapping her way through the 1990s. Gillette graduated from Romeoville High School in 1993. On August 31, 1994, Gillette released, alongside producers 20 Fingers, and her manager/sister, Yolanda Gillette their first single "Short Dick Man" on Zoo Entertainment/SOS Records, which was controversial. The tune was a global success, particularly in France where it was a number one hit for three weeks. It peaked the top 5 in several European countries such as Italy and Germany and also reached the top ten in other countries, including Austria, Belgium, New Zealand and Australia. It also reached number 14 in the U.S. and was considered a club success there. This single, which involves Gillette mocking the size of a man's penis, was also released in a clean version replacing the word "dick" with "short", which was also released under the censored title "Short, Short Man" in the U.K. and several other countries. This new version, remixed by Strike, reached No. 11, whereas the original only reached No. 21 in the UK Singles Chart in 1994. Manny Mohr of 20 Fingers told the Los Angeles Times that the point of the song was to attract attention. "We figured there were all these songs by men bashing women and treating women like sex objects. So we decided a song that turned the tables on men might attract some attention". According to Gillette, the point of the song is to "strike back at all the women-bashing songs in pop, especially in rap". In the accompanying music video, images of Gillette singing "Short Dick Man" or "Short Short Man" on a beach and other places alternate with those of a brawny man performing a photo session.

=== 1994–1999: "On the Attack" and "Shake Your Money Maker" ===
After the massive global success of "Short Dick Man", the producers of 20 Fingers decided to release a full Gillette solo album, called "On the Attack" in Brazil, Canada, Scandinavia, Australia, Japan, Portugal, Chile, South Korea, U.S. and other selected countries, while in Poland and Germany, they released it as a 20 Fingers debut studio album, still credited as "20 Fingers feat. Gillette", retitled "On the Attack and More", an altered cover art and two bonus tracks. 20 Fingers continued to release the singles "Mr. Personality" and "You're a Dog" under the name "20 Fingers feat. Gillette" in Poland and Germany, while as Gillette solo releases everywhere else. In 1996, Gillette released her second studio album Shake Your Money Maker, again fully produced by 20 Fingers, and its three single releases "Do Fries Go With That Shake?", "Bounce" and "Shake Your Money Maker" between 1996 and 1997. The album and its three singles did not chart well.

=== 2000–2005: "Did I Say That?" and Peekaboo Revue ===
In 2000, 20 Fingers wrote and produced the song "Sex Tonight" off of Gillette's third solo album "Did I Say That", which was the first and only release out of the album and became a minor club hit in the U.S. In 2004, she co-founded a Cabaret group named the Peekaboo Revue. In 2005, after a year of performances, the group eventually went their own ways. Gillette has been retired from rapping and acting ever since. She has a husband and children.

== Discography ==
=== Studio albums ===
Title	Details	Peak chart positions		Info
Title	Details	AUT	GER	Info
On the Attack	Release date: December 20, 1994; Label: BMG; Formats: CD, Cassette	24	26	Debut studio album by Gillette. Released as 20 Fingers' debut album in 1995, retitled On the Attack and More in Poland and Germany.
Shake Your Money Maker	Release date: May 21, 1996; Label: BMG; Formats: CD	—	—	Second studio album by Gillette. Produced by 20 Fingers and features the singles "Do Fries Go with That Shake?", "Bounce" and "Shake Your Money Maker".
Did I Say That?	Release date: October 3, 2000; Label: Jellybean Recordings; Formats: CD	—	—	Third and to date final studio album by Gillette. It features the single "Sex Tonight". The full album was not officially released.
"—" denotes releases that did not chart

=== Singles ===
Year	Single	Peak chart positions										Certifications (sales thresholds)	Album
Year	Single	US	AUT	BEL (Fl)	BEL (Wa)	FRA	GER	ITA	NED	NZ	UK	Certifications (sales thresholds)	Album
1994	"Short Dick Man" (featuring 20 Fingers)	14	6	10	6	1	3	1	7	7	11	RIAA: Gold; BVMI: Gold; SNEP: Gold	On the Attack
1995	"Mr. Personality" (Note: "Mr. Personality" has been released as a 20 Fingers feat. Gillette song in Germany and Poland.)	42	—	—	19	—	22	14	—	32	—		On the Attack
1995	"You're a Dog" (Note: "You're a Dog" has been released as a 20 Fingers feat. Gillette song in Germany and Poland.)	—	—	—	—	—	—	—	—	—	—		On the Attack
1996	"Do Fries Go with That Shake?"	—	—	—	—	—	—	—	—	—	—		Shake Your Money Maker
1996	"Bounce"	—	—	—	—	—	—	—	—	—	—		Shake Your Money Maker
1997	"Shake Your Money Maker"	—	—	—	—	—	—	—	—	—	—		Shake Your Money Maker
2000	"Sex Tonight"	—	—	—	—	—	—	—	—	—	—		Did I Say That?
"—" denotes releases that did not chart

=== Music videos ===
- 1994: "Short Dick Man"
- 1995: "Mr. Personality"
- 1996: "Do Fries Go with That Shake?"
- 1997: "Shake Your Money Maker"
