= Max-A-Million =

American recording group

- Origin: Chicago, Illinois, U.S.
- Genres: Electronic; reggae fusion; Eurodance
- Years active: 1994–98, 2021–present
- Labels: SOS; DJ International
- Past members: A'Lisa B Duran Estevez; Tommye

Max-A-Million is an American recording group from Chicago, Illinois. The group, active from 1994 to 1998, consisted of singers A'Lisa B., Duran Estevez, and Tommye. During their early years, Max-A-Million released one album containing four singles, three of which charted on the US Billboard Hot 100, including a cover of Marvin Gaye's "Sexual Healing". The band's name is a pun on the male given name "Maximilian" which is Latin for "greatest".

In May 2021, Max-A-Million released a single titled "What You Do", followed by the single "Touch Me" featuring Zoe, in June 2024.

== Discography ==
=== Studio albums ===
| Year | Title | Details |
|---|---|---|
| 1995 | Take Your Time | Label: SOS Records; Formats: CD |

=== Singles ===
| Year | Single | Peak chart positions | | | | | | | Certification |
| Year | Single | US | US Dance | AUS | CAN | CAN Dance | GER | NZ | Certification |
|---|---|---|---|---|---|---|---|---|---|
| 1994 | "Fat Boy" | 69 | 47 | — | — | 1 | — | — | |
| 1995 | "Take Your Time (Do It Right)" | 64 | 18 | — | — | 3 | — | 13 | |
| 1995 | "Sexual Healing" | 60 | — | 5 | 76 | 1 | 59 | 4 | ARIA: Platinum; RMNZ: Gold |
| 1995 | "Everybody's Groovin'" | — | 45 | — | — | 8 | — | — | |
| 2021 | "What You Do" | — | — | — | — | — | — | — | |
| 2024 | "Touch Me" (featuring Zoe) | — | — | — | — | — | — | — | |
"—" denotes releases that did not chart
