= Robert Mailhouse =

American actor and musician (born 1962)

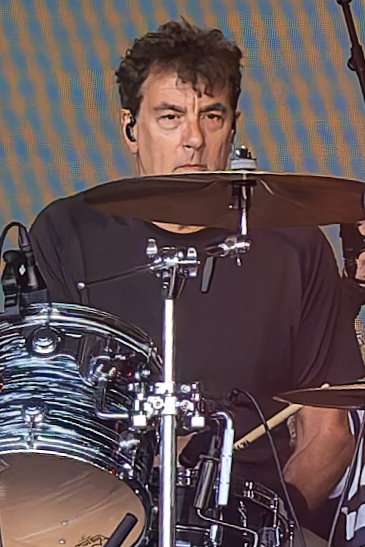
- Mailhouse in 2024
- Born: January 22, 1962 (age 64); New Haven, Connecticut, U.S.
- Occupations: Actor, musician

Robert Kenneth Mailhouse (born January 22, 1962) is an American actor and musician. He has appeared in television series including the soap opera Days of Our Lives and the sitcom Seinfeld. He is the drummer and founding member alongside bassist Keanu Reeves for the grunge-alternative rock band Dogstar. He also plays in the band Becky.

== Career ==
Mailhouse is a graduate of Suffield Academy. In the early 1990s, he appeared on the soap opera Days of Our Lives. He appeared in guest roles in a variety of television series in the 1990s, including Seinfeld, Picket Fences, Melrose Place, Caroline in the City (1997), Dharma & Greg (1999) and Sports Night (1998-2000), in a recurring role as CSC executive JJ. In the 2000s, he appeared in episodes of television series such as Judging Amy (2002) and C.S.I.: Crime Scene Investigation (2003). He has also appeared in several films, including Speed (1994). As a musician, he played drums with the grunge-alternative rock band Dogstar, which has opened for David Bowie and toured with Bon Jovi. The band released an EP entitled Quattro Formagi (1995) and two albums: Our Little Visionary (Zoo/BMG, 1996) and Happy Ending (2000). Dogstar attracted media attention from the off-stage job held by its bassist Keanu Reeves as a Hollywood actor. Mailhouse starred in The Christmas Pageant alongside actress Melissa Gilbert in 2011.

== Filmography ==
Year	Title	Role	Notes
1994	Speed	Young Executive	
1996	Seinfeld	Robert	Episode: "The Beard"
1996	The Glimmer Man	Smith's Bodyguard/Bouncer at Lento's	
1998	Just a Little Harmless Sex	Alan	
1999	Kimberly	Walter	
1999	Me and Will	Dogstar / Himself	
2003	C.S.I.: Crime Scene Investigation	Les Dutton, Restaurant Manager	Episode: "Recipe for Murder"
2005	Thicker Than Water	Larry Gorman, Lawyer	Hallmark Channel Movie
2005	CSI: Miami	Dave Strong	Episode: "Game Over"
2005	CSI: NY	Stan Vonner	Episode: "Jamalot"
2014	Some Kind of Beautiful	Alan	
2016	Missed Connections	Jason Birch	
