= Pitbull Starring in Rebelution =

Studio album by Pitbull
- Released: August 28, 2009
- Recorded: 2007–2009
- Genres: Hip house; electropop; pop rap
- Length: 47:31
- Labels: J; Polo Grounds; Mr. 305
- Producers: Jim Jonsin; Adrian "Drop" Santalla; Bass III Euro; Clinton Sparks; DJ Class; DJ Khalil; DJ Noodles; Dr. Luke; Lil Jon; Nicola Fasano; Play-N-Skillz; Point Blank The Marksman

Pitbull chronology
The Boatlift (2007)	Pitbull Starring in Rebelution (2009)	Armando (2010)

Singles from Pitbull Starring in Rebelution
- 1. "Krazy" Released: September 30, 2008; 2. "I Know You Want Me (Calle Ocho)" Released: February 24, 2009; 3. "Hotel Room Service" Released: June 16, 2009; 4. "Shut It Down" Released: November 2, 2009

Pitbull Starring in Rebelution is the fourth studio album by American rapper Pitbull. It was released on August 28, 2009, through J, Polo Grounds and Mr. 305. The production on the album was handled by multiple producers including DJ Khalil, Dr. Luke, Lil Jon, Play-N-Skillz and Jim Jonsin who also served as executive producer. The album also features guest appearances by B.o.B, Kesha, Nayer, Akon, Lil Jon and Slim of 112. This became his first major-label release, his first album to be released on his own Mr. 305 Inc. label and also Polo Grounds' second release since Hurricane Chris's 51/50 Ratchet. Pitbull Starring in Rebelution was noted as the rapper's first release as part of his rebranding as a pop artist.

Pitbull Starring in Rebelution was supported by four singles: "Krazy", "I Know You Want Me (Calle Ocho)", "Shut It Down" and "Hotel Room Service". The album received generally mixed reviews from music critics but was a moderate commercial success. The album debuted at number eight on the US Billboard 200 chart, selling 41,000 copies its first week.

== Singles ==
The album spawned four singles. The first single from the album was "Krazy". It was released on September 30, 2008, and was produced by and featured Lil Jon. It also peaked at number 30 on the US Billboard Hot 100. The song samples Federico Franchi's 2007 song, "Cream". The second single was "I Know You Want Me (Calle Ocho)". It was released on February 24, 2009. The single eventually peaked at number two on the US Billboard Hot 100. The song is a vocal mix of "75, Brazil Street" by Nicola Fasano Vs Pat Rich. The third single was "Hotel Room Service". It peaked at number eight on the US Billboard Hot 100, becoming the second single was the album to reach the top-ten. The song recreates elements from "Push the Feeling On" by Nightcrawlers. A remix, "Hotel Room Service (Remix)" featuring Nicole Scherzinger, was released on October 9, 2009 and was included on the deluxe version of the album that was released on 23rd of that same month. The fourth single was "Shut It Down", featuring Akon. It was released on November 2, 2009, with the music video. The single eventually peaked at number 42 on the US Billboard Hot 100.

=== Promotional music videos ===
- "Can't Stop Me Now" featuring The New Royales was released on June 14, 2010, on Pitbull's YouTube channel.

== Legal issues ==
In 2009, the reggae band Rebelution sued Pitbull for trademark infringement based on the name of this album. In 2010, the court rejected Pitbull's request for summary judgment.

== Critical reception ==
Professional ratings
Aggregate scores
Source	Rating
Metacritic	51/100
Review scores
Source	Rating
AllMusic	3/5 stars
Billboard	(mixed)
DJBooth.net	3/5
Entertainment Weekly	B−
HipHopSite.Com	3.5/4
Los Angeles Times	2.5/4 stars
Now	2/5
RapReviews	6/10

Pitbull Starring in Rebelution was met with "mixed or average" reviews from critics. At Metacritic, which assigns a weighted average rating out of 100 to reviews from mainstream publications, this release received an average score of 51 based on 7 reviews.

In a review for AllMusic, David Jeffries wrote: "On the mistitled Rebelution, rapper Pitbull takes a cue from his homeboy Flo Rida and dives headfirst into the lucrative world of ultra-slick Miami club-rap. Even if it's not the most persuasive mood album, once the party has kicked into high gear Rebelution will certainly keep it going." Ayala Ben-Yehuda of Billboard gave a mixed review, explaining: "You either love or hate Pitbull's music, and sometimes a little of both when listening to the same album. As with the Miami rapper's past releases, his newest set, "Rebelution," is a mix of infectious dance hooks and rapid-fire rhymes — some are clever and fun, others are just plain graphic."

== Commercial performance ==
Pitbull Starring in Rebelution debuted at number eight on the US Billboard 200 chart, selling 41,000 copies its first week, according to Nielsen Soundscan. This became Pitbull's first US top-ten debut. As of April 2012, the album had sold 249,000 copies in the US. On October 16, 2020, the album was certified gold by the Recording Industry Association of America (RIAA) for combined sales and album-equivalent units of over 500,000 units in the United States.

== Track listing ==
Standard edition
No.	Title	Writer(s)	Producer(s)	Length
1.	"Triumph" (featuring Avery Storm)	Armando C. Perez; Adrian Santalla; Gabriel Pelaez; Jesse Michael Nieves; Ralph Di Stasio	Adrian "Drop" Santalla; Pitbull^{[a]}; DJ Buddha^{[a]}	3:20
2.	"Shut It Down" (featuring Akon)	Perez; Clinton Sparks; Aliaune Thiam; William Grigahcine	Clinton Sparks; DJ Snake; Pitbull^{[a]}	3:46
3.	"I Know You Want Me (Calle Ocho)"	Perez; Edward Bello; David Wolinski; Daniel Seraphine; Nicola Fasano; Stefano Bosco; Patrick Gonella	Nicola Fasano; Pitbull^{[a]}	3:57
4.	"Girls" (featuring Kesha)	Perez; Lukasz Gottwald; Joshua Coleman; George Clinton; Garry Shider; David Spradley	Dr. Luke; Ammo	3:07
5.	"Full of Shit" (featuring Nayer & Bass III Euro)	Perez; Jean-Christoph Ritter; Özgür Yelmen; Steve Garrett; Elgin Lumpkins; Timothy Mosley	Bass III Euro	3:54
6.	"Dope Ball" (Interlude)	Perez; Matthew Naples	DJ Noodles	1:40
7.	"Can't Stop Me Now" (featuring The New Royales)	Perez; Khalil Abdul-Rahman; Erik Alcock; Liz Rodriguez; Pranam Injeti	DJ Khalil	3:14
8.	"Hotel Room Service"	Perez; James Scheffer; Nile Rodgers; Bernard Edwards; Luther Campbell; David Hobbs; Mark Ross; Christopher Wong Won; Hugh Brankin; Ross Campbell; John Reid; Graham Wilson	Jim Jonsin; Pitbull^{[a]}	3:57
9.	"Juice Box"	Perez; Daniel Woodis	DJ Class	3:05
10.	"Call of the Wild"	Perez; Scheffer	Jim Jonsin; Pitbull^{[a]}	3:11
11.	"Krazy" (featuring Lil Jon)	Perez; Jonathan Smith; Federico Franchi	Lil Jon	3:51
12.	"Give Them What They Ask For"	Perez; Justin Rockman	Point Blank the Marksman	2:56
13.	"Across the World" (featuring B.o.B)	Perez; Scheffer; Bobby Ray Simmons	Jim Jonsin	3:49
14.	"Daddy's Little Girl" (featuring Slim)	Perez; Juan Salinas; Oscar Salinas	Play-N-Skillz	3:44
Total length:				47:31

Deluxe edition
No.	Title	Length
15.	"Hotel Room Service" (Remix) (featuring Nicole Scherzinger)	3:47
Total length:		51:18

Japan edition bonus track
No.	Title	Producer(s)	Length
16.	"All About You"	Jim Jonsin	3:25
Total length:			54:43

iTunes bonus track
No.	Title	Writer(s)	Producer(s)	Length
17.	"Pearly Gates" (featuring Nayer)	Perez; Scheffer; Wayne Wilkins; Naples; Bryan Adams; Jim Vallance	Jim Jonsin; Wayne Wilkins; DJ Noodles; Pitbull^{[a]}	3:22
Total length:				58:05

Notes

- ^{^[a]} signifies a co-producer

Sample credits

- "I Know You Want Me (Calle Ocho)" contains a sample of "75 Brazil Street", written by David Wolinski, Daniel Seraphine, Nicola Fasano, Stefano Bosco, and Patrick Gonella, as performed by Nicola Fasano.
- "Girls" contains a portion of "Atomic Dog", written by George Clinton, Garry Shider, and David Spradley.
- "Full of Shit" contains a sample of "Pony", written by Steve Garrett, Elgin Lumpkins, and Timothy Mosley, as performed by Ginuwine.
- "Hotel Room Service" contains:
  - a portion of "Rapper's Delight", written by Nile Rodgers and Bernard Edwards.
  - a portion of "One and One", written by Luther Campbell, David Hobbs, Mark Ross, and Christopher Wong Won.
  - a sample from "Push the Feeling On", written by Hugh Brankin, Ross Campbell, John Reid, and Graham Wilson.
- "Krazy" contains a sample of "Cream", written and performed by Federico Franchi.
- "Pearly Gates" contains a portion of "Heaven", written by Bryan Adams and Jim Vallance.

== Charts ==
=== Weekly charts ===
Weekly chart performance for Pitbull Starring in Rebelution
Chart (2009)	Peak position
Argentinian Albums (CAPIF)	10
Australian Albums (ARIA)	54
Austrian Albums (Ö3 Austria)	20
Belgian Albums (Ultratop Flanders)	23
Belgian Albums (Ultratop Wallonia)	15
Canadian Albums (Billboard)	3
Dutch Albums (Album Top 100)	42
French Albums (SNEP)	24
German Albums (Offizielle Top 100)	34
Irish Albums (IRMA)	88
Italian Albums (FIMI)	86
Polish Albums (ZPAV)	45
Spanish Albums (Promusicae)	90
Swiss Albums (Schweizer Hitparade)	8
UK R&B Albums (Official Charts)	11
US Billboard 200	8
US Top R&B/Hip-Hop Albums (Billboard)	5

2026 weekly chart performance for Pitbull Starring in Rebelution
Chart (2026)	Peak position
Lithuanian Albums (AGATA)	36

=== Year-end charts ===
2009 year-end chart performance for Pitbull Starring in Rebelution
Chart (2009)	Position
US Top R&B/Hip-Hop Albums (Billboard)	95

2010 year-end chart performance for Pitbull Starring in Rebelution
Chart (2010)	Position
US Top R&B/Hip-Hop Albums (Billboard)	69

== Certifications and sales ==
Certifications and sales for Pitbull Starring in Rebelution
Region	Certification	Certified units/sales
Canada (Music Canada)	Gold	40,000^{^}
Indonesia	—	10,000
Mexico (AMPROFON)	Gold	30,000^{^}
New Zealand (RMNZ)	Platinum	15,000^{‡}
United States (RIAA)	Platinum	1,000,000^{‡}
^{^} Shipments figures based on certification alone.^{‡} Sales+streaming figures based on certification alone.

== See also ==
- Rebelution Tour
