= Hotel Room Service =

2009 single by Pitbull

Single by Pitbull

from the album Pitbull Starring in Rebelution
- Released: June 16, 2009
- Recorded: 2009
- Genre: hip hop, dirty rap, hip house
- Length: 3:57
- Label: Mr. 305; Polo Grounds; J; RMG
- Songwriters: John Reid; Marc Kinchen; Mark Ross; David Hobbs; Nile Rodgers; Hugh Brankin; Armando Pérez; Graham Wilson; Ross Campbell; James Scheffer; Bernard Edwards; Luther Campbell; Christopher Wong Won
- Producer: Jim Jonsin

Pitbull singles chronology
"Blanco" (2009)	"Hotel Room Service" (2009)	"Now I'm That Bitch" (2009)

Music video
- "Hotel Room Service" on YouTube

"Hotel Room Service" is a song by American rapper Pitbull released as the third single from his fourth album, Pitbull Starring in Rebelution. It was released to both iTunes and mainstream radio on June 16, 2009. The song peaked at number eight on the US Billboard Hot 100, making it his second top 10 hit following "I Know You Want Me (Calle Ocho)".

The song samples "Push the Feeling On" by Nightcrawlers and "La Hora De Bailar" by Sandy & Papo, interpolates lyrics from Jay-Z's "I Just Wanna Love U" ("Gimme that sweet, that nasty, that gushy stuff"), The Notorious B.I.G.'s "Nasty Girl" ("Put them fingers in your mouth / Open up your blouse / Pull that g-string down south"), and Sugarhill Gang's "Rapper's Delight" ("We at the hotel, motel, Holiday Inn"), "One and One" by the 2 Live Crew ("Three and three, you gon' undress me") and references T.I.'s "Whatever You Like" ("And like T.I., it's 'Whatever You Like'").

On September 16, 2009, the official remix to "Hotel Room Service" was released, which features Pussycat Dolls lead singer Nicole Scherzinger.

A version of the song titled "Super Clean Edit" was distributed to radio stations which replaces the line referencing "egg whites" with "gonna give you just what you like."

== Music video ==
The song's official music video was released on August 10, 2009 to Pitbull's YouTube channel.

Jim Jonsin, Sophia Del Carmen and Feisty from For the Love of Ray J make cameo appearances in the video as does Nayer and Sagia Castañeda, who appeared in the "I Know You Want Me (Calle Ocho)" video as well. The video features Pitbull with models Elizabeth Mendez, Cassie Codi, Lisa Morales, Anya Gonzalez, and Kimbella Vanderhee.

The video was also released onto Pitbull's official Vevo channel on November 14, that year. It has received almost 300 million views.

== Critical reception ==
The song received generally favorable reviews, with David Jeffries from AllMusic saying, "nothing ... could fill a dancefloor as quickly as the ... stunner ... 'Hotel Room Service', which triple mashes an old-school hit ('Rapper's Delight'), a 2 Live Crew classic ('One and One'), plus a house music giant (the Nightcrawlers' 'Push the Feeling On')."

== Track listing ==
1. "Hotel Room Service" – 3:58
2. "Hotel Room Service" (Remix; featuring Nicole Scherzinger) – 3:47

== Charts ==
=== Weekly charts ===
Chart (2009)	Peak position
Australia (ARIA)	11
Austria (Ö3 Austria Top 40)	22
Belgium (Ultratop 50 Flanders)	10
Belgium (Ultratop 50 Wallonia)	8
Canada Hot 100 (Billboard)	7
Canada CHR/Top 40 (Billboard)	4
CIS Airplay (TopHit)	96
Croatia International Airplay (HRT)	6
Czech Republic Airplay (ČNS IFPI)	1
Denmark (Tracklisten)	10
European Hot 100 Singles (Billboard)	16
Finland (Suomen virallinen lista)	16
France (SNEP)	4
Germany (GfK)	22
Global Dance Tracks (Billboard)	2
Hungary (Dance Top 40)	4
Hungary (Rádiós Top 40)	28
Ireland (IRMA)	6
Israel International Airplay (Media Forest)	6
Italy (FIMI)	33
Mexico Anglo (Monitor Latino)	2
Netherlands (Dutch Top 40)	14
Netherlands (Single Top 100)	40
New Zealand (Recorded Music NZ)	29
Poland Dance (ZPAV)	8
Scottish Singles Sales (Official Charts)	10
Slovakia Airplay (ČNS IFPI)	29
Spain (Promusicae)	15
Sweden (Sverigetopplistan)	14
Switzerland (Schweizer Hitparade)	11
Turkey (Türkiye Top 20)	3
UK Singles (Official Charts)	9
UK Hip Hop/R&B (Official Charts)	5
US Billboard Hot 100	8
US Dance Airplay (Billboard)	10
US Hot Latin Songs (Billboard)	26
US Hot R&B/Hip-Hop Songs (Billboard)	85
US Hot Rap Songs (Billboard)	7
US Pop Airplay (Billboard)	11
US Rhythmic Airplay (Billboard)	3

2025–2026 weekly chart performance for "Hotel Room Service"
Chart (2025–2026)	Peak position
Latvia Streaming (LaIPA)	12
Lithuania (AGATA)	19
Poland (Polish Streaming Top 100)	31

=== Remix version ===
Chart (2009)	Peak position
Australian Singles Chart	58

=== Year-end charts ===
Chart (2009)	Position
Australia (ARIA)	93
Belgium (Ultratop Flanders)	99
Belgium (Ultratop Wallonia)	91
Canada (Canadian Hot 100)	55
Croatia International Airplay (HRT)	100
Hungary (Dance Top 40)	30
Hungary (Rádiós Top 40)	151
Sweden (Sverigetopplistan)	83
Switzerland (Schweizer Hitparade)	67
UK Singles (OCC)	94
US Billboard Hot 100	46
US Rhythmic (Billboard)	19
Chart (2010)	Position
Australia (ARIA)	96
Hungary (Dance Top 40)	28

== Certifications ==
Region	Certification	Certified units/sales
Australia (ARIA)	2× Platinum	140,000^{‡}
Canada (Music Canada)	2× Platinum	80,000^{*}
Canada (Music Canada) Ringtone	Platinum	40,000^{*}
Denmark (IFPI Danmark)	Platinum	90,000^{‡}
Germany (BVMI)	Platinum	300,000^{‡}
Italy (FIMI)	Gold	50,000^{‡}
Mexico (AMPROFON)	Gold	30,000^{*}
New Zealand (RMNZ)	2× Platinum	60,000^{‡}
United Kingdom (BPI)	Platinum	600,000^{‡}
United States (RIAA)	5× Platinum	5,000,000^{‡}
^{*} Sales figures based on certification alone.^{‡} Sales+streaming figures based on certification alone.
