= Let's Push It (song) =

Single by Nightcrawlers featuring John Reid

from the album Lets Push It
- B-side: "Remix"
- Released: 8 January 1996
- Genre: Eurodance; house; UK garage
- Length: 3:36
- Label: Arista; BMG; Final Vinyl
- Songwriters: John Reid; Michael J McEvoy; Ronald Wilson; Stepz-3
- Producer: John Reid

Nightcrawlers featuring John Reid singles chronology
"Don't Let the Feeling Go" (1995)	"Let's Push It" (1996)	"Never Knew Love" (1999)

Music video
- "Let's Push It" on YouTube

"Let's Push It" is a song recorded by British house music group Nightcrawlers and released in January 1996, by Arista, BMG and Final Vinyl, as the fourth single from their only album, Lets Push It (1995). It is produced by the group's frontman John Reid, who also co-wrote it. In the UK, it peaked at number 23 in its first week at the UK Singles Chart, on 14 January. It was a notable hit also in other European countries, such as Belgium, Ireland, Scotland and Sweden. Outside Europe, the song reached number 107 in Australia.

== Critical reception ==
Pan-European magazine Music & Media wrote that the song "will undoubtedly prove to be another chart hit for the British funkateers. Its Eurodisco keyboard style is part of the rhythm section. 'Let's Push It' is less funky and more dance-y, but the result is still a highly infectious groove. To be released in Nightcrawlers-loving France first and the rest of Europe afterwards." British Music Week gave it two out of five, adding, "With their followers, another hit, probably. But this rather disappointing track ultimately lacks the richness and power of the three previous Top 20 successes." James Hamilton from the Record Mirror Dance Update felt it "at times [is] a proper song". DJ Freshy-D from Smash Hits gave "Let's Push It" three out of five, saying, "Wicked! It's like their last one... but er, different! Kind of sing-songy... nice one, later!"

== Track listings ==
- CD single, UK & Europe
1. "Let's Push It" (7" Radio Edit) — 3:36
2. "Let's Push It" (Evolution Club Mix) — 6:56
3. "Let's Push It" (MK Club Mix) — 6:29
4. "Let's Push It" (Boot & Mac Vocoder Mix) — 8:40
5. "Let's Push It" (Evolution Dub Mix) — 8:02
6. "Let's Push It" (MK Dub Mix) — 6:15
- CD maxi, CD1, Europe
1. "Let's Push It" (7" Radio Edit) — 3:36
2. "Let's Push It" (Evolution Club Mix) — 6:56
3. "Let's Push It" (MK Club Mix) — 6:29
4. "Let's Push It" (Boot & Mac Vocoder Mix) — 8:40
5. "Let's Push It" (Evolution Dub Mix) — 8:02
6. "Let's Push It" (MK Dub Mix) — 6:15
- CD maxi, CD2, Europe
1. "Let's Push It" (Radio Edit) — 3:31
2. "Push the Feeling On" (Argonaut's Smokin' Hot Mix) — 9:13
3. "Surrender Your Love" (Argonaut's Mix) — 7:51
4. "Push the Feeling On" (MK Dub Revisited Edit) — 4:00

== Charts ==
Chart (1995–1996)	Peak position
Australia (ARIA)	107
Belgium (Ultratop 50 Flanders)	35
Belgium (Ultratop 50 Wallonia)	33
Europe (Eurochart Hot 100)	31
Europe (European Dance Radio)	10
Europe (European Hit Radio)	25
Ireland (IRMA)	30
Netherlands (Dutch Top 40 Tipparade)	15
Netherlands (Dutch Single Tip)	6
Scotland Singles (OCC)	28
Sweden (Sverigetopplistan)	41
UK Singles (OCC)	23
UK Airplay (Music Week)	17
UK Club Chart (Music Week)	8
