= Don't Let the Feeling Go =

1995 single by Nightcrawlers

Single by Nightcrawlers featuring John Reid

from the album Lets Push It
- Released: 28 August 1995
- Genre: Disco; house; UK garage
- Length: 3:53
- Label: Arista; BMG; Final Vinyl
- Songwriters: John Reid; Marc Kinchen; Graham Wilson
- Producers: John Reid; Marc Kinchen

Nightcrawlers singles chronology
"Surrender Your Love" (1995)	"Don't Let the Feeling Go" (1995)	"Let's Push It" (1996)

Music video
- "Don't Let the Feeling Go" on YouTube

"Don't Let the Feeling Go" is a song by British house music group Nightcrawlers and released in August 1995 by Arista, BMG and Final Vinyl as the third single from the group's only album, Lets Push It (1995). The song is produced by American DJ and record producer MK, and written by John Reid with Kinchen and Graham Wilson. In the UK, it peaked at number 13 during its first week on the UK Singles Chart, on 9 September 1995. "Don't Let the Feeling Go" became a hit also in other countries, such as Finland, where it peaked at number five, and in Belgium, Ireland, Scotland, Sweden and Switzerland, where the single reached the top 30. The accompanying music video was directed by Guy Ritchie.

== Critical reception ==
In his weekly UK chart commentary in Dotmusic, James Masterton wrote, "With their third single the Nightcrawlers move further and further away from the pure dance they started with and into the realm of the proper pop single, pushing singer John Reid to the fore and producing a track which is danceable but is still enough of a song to make it into mainstream radio programming." Pan-European magazine Music & Media said, "Do you wanna funk? Then push the feeling a little further and surrender to John Reid's third single in 1994, on which he goes back to Sylvester and Patrick Cowleys' kind of disco adapted to producer Kinchen's sound." Simon Sadler, head of music at Kiss 100FM/London was the first one to report a new Nightcrawlers single. He added, "On the one hand it's good as it prolongs a winning formula. On the other hand, I see it as their last chance to use the same old recipe again."

A reviewer from Music Week gave "Don't Let the Feeling Go" three out of five, adding that the singer "keeps to the formula which has provided two hits but, although the club and dub mixes are powerful floorfillers, it's unlikely to win much favour with radio programmers." James Hamilton from the Record Mirror Dance Update deemed it "another staccato stutterer, except this time also coherently chorused and whined". Also Jordan Paramor from Smash Hits gave the song three out of five. She felt "it's simply not as good" as "Push the Feeling On", and added, "It's still got the beats and the bleepy bits, and the bloke with the electronic voice, so I'm sure I'll be up dancing to it like an idiot after a few too many shandies!"

== Music video ==
The music video for "Don't Let the Feeling Go" was directed by English film director Guy Ritchie. It features singer John Reid performing while driving a van. In the back, there is a party going on, with several people, and as Reid continues to sing, some of the people from the party comes out and sits next to him. In the middle of the video, he appears in the party, and when it ends, someone else is driving, while Reid sits in the middle of a crowd of people.

== Track listings ==
- 12-inch (MK & Tin Tin Out Mixes), UK
1. "Don't Let the Feeling Go" (Tin Tin Out vocal mix)
2. "Don't Let the Feeling Go" (Tooley Street dub)
3. "Don't Let the Feeling Go" (MK club mix)
4. "Don't Let the Feeling Go" (MK dub mix)
- CD single, Europe
1. "Don't Let the Feeling Go" (MK radio edit) — 3:53
2. "Don't Let the Feeling Go" (MK club mix) — 7:32
- CD maxi (MK & Tin Tin Out Mixes), UK
1. "Don't Let the Feeling Go" (Tin Tin Out radio edit) — 3:50
2. "Don't Let the Feeling Go" (MK radio edit) — 3:49
3. "Don't Let the Feeling Go" (Tin Tin Out vocal mix) — 6:47
4. "Don't Let the Feeling Go" (MK club mix) — 7:31
5. "Don't Let the Feeling Go" (Tooley Street dub) — 7:04
6. "Don't Let the Feeling Go" (MK dub mix) — 7:55

== Charts ==
Chart (1995)	Peak position
Belgium (Ultratop 50 Flanders)	46
Belgium (Ultratop 50 Wallonia)	24
Europe (Eurochart Hot 100)	21
Europe (European Dance Radio)	14
Finland (Suomen virallinen lista)	5
Ireland (IRMA)	26
Israel (Israeli Singles Chart)	27
Netherlands (Dutch Single Tip)	11
Scottish Singles Sales (Official Charts)	27
Sweden (Sverigetopplistan)	30
Switzerland (Schweizer Hitparade)	25
UK Singles (Official Charts)	13
UK Dance (OCC)	6
UK Singles (Music & Media)	10
UK Pop Tip Club Chart (Music Week)	3
