= Friday (Riton and Nightcrawlers song) =

Single by Riton and Nightcrawlers featuring Mufasa & Hypeman
- Released: 15 January 2021
- Length: 2:49
- Label: Ministry of Sound
- Songwriters: Graham McMillan Wilson; Hugh Jude Brankin; John Robinson Reid; Ross Alexander Campbell; Samantha Harper
- Producers: The Invisible Men; Riton

Riton singles chronology
"Too High" (2020)	"Friday" (2021)	"Come With Me" (2021)

Nightcrawlers singles chronology
"Push the Feeling On 2k12" (2012)	"Friday" (2021)	"Losing My Mind" (2021)

Music video
- "Friday" on YouTube

"Friday", also known as "Friday (Dopamine Re-Edit)", is a song recorded by English DJ and producer Riton and Scottish-American house music project Nightcrawlers featuring internet personalities Mufasa & Hypeman with uncredited vocals by Samantha Harper. It was released on 15 January 2021 through Ministry of Sound. The song heavily samples the MK remix of Nightcrawlers' "Push the Feeling On" (1992). It reached number one in Flanders and Poland, and the top 10 in Germany, Italy, Ireland, Lithuania, the Netherlands, the United Kingdom and Wallonia, as well as the top 20 in Australia and in Canada. The song has over a billion plays on Spotify.

== Background ==
In early 2020, Mufasa & Hypeman started gaining viral success through dance clips and meme videos. English DJ Riton and producers The Invisible Men became aware of the duo through their viral videos on YouTube. About the collaboration, he revealed, "They are the only people who should be allowed to use social media in 2021! They got a lot of people through 2020, and so it's only right to make a song out of it and do it all again in 2021".

== Music video ==
The official music video for "Friday" features Mufasa waking the cameraman up, then joining Hypeman and some friends to dance on a boat, in a house, near a car, and in a desert. The video features some of Mufasa's viral dancing, as well as Riton DJing and John Reid of Nightcrawlers appearing to "sing" his sampled vocals from the original "Push the Feeling On" remix.

== In popular culture ==
At the 2020 Tuscan Grand Prix, Formula 1 driver Lando Norris sung "Friday" during the first free practice session on the race radio. The song was then immediately associated with him, prompting Norris to beg his fans to stop singing it to him.

== Charts ==
=== Weekly charts ===
Weekly chart performance for "Friday"
Chart (2021–2024)	Peak position
Australia (ARIA)	12
Austria (Ö3 Austria Top 40)	5
Belarus Airplay (TopHit)	155
Belgium (Ultratop 50 Flanders)	1
Belgium (Ultratop 50 Wallonia)	2
Bulgaria Airplay (PROPHON)	2
Canada Hot 100 (Billboard)	16
Canada CHR/Top 40 (Billboard)	7
CIS Airplay (TopHit)	11
Croatia International Airplay (Top lista)	1
Czech Republic Airplay (ČNS IFPI)	37
Czech Republic Singles Digital (ČNS IFPI)	1
Denmark (Tracklisten)	13
El Salvador Airplay (ASAP EGC)	1
Finland (Suomen virallinen lista)	6
France (SNEP)	21
Germany (GfK)	3
Global 200 (Billboard)	18
Greece International (IFPI)	8
Hungary (Dance Top 40)	13
Hungary (Rádiós Top 40)	2
Hungary (Single Top 40)	4
Hungary (Stream Top 40)	3
Iceland (Tónlistinn)	10
Ireland (IRMA)	3
Italy (FIMI)	8
Lithuania (AGATA)	6
Netherlands (Dutch Top 40)	3
Netherlands (Single Top 100)	3
New Zealand (Recorded Music NZ)	29
Norway (VG-lista)	13
Poland Airplay (ZPAV)	1
Portugal (AFP)	7
Romania (Airplay 100)	2
Russia Airplay (TopHit)	38
San Marino Airplay (SMRTV Top 50)	10
Slovakia Airplay (ČNS IFPI)	2
Slovakia Singles Digital (ČNS IFPI)	2
South Africa Streaming (RISA)	64
Spain (PROMUSICAE)	25
Sweden (Sverigetopplistan)	23
Switzerland (Schweizer Hitparade)	2
Ukraine Airplay (TopHit)	78
UK Singles (Official Charts)	4
UK Dance (Official Charts)	2
US Billboard Hot 100	86
US Hot Dance/Electronic Songs (Billboard)	5
US Pop Airplay (Billboard)	25

2026 weekly chart performance for "Friday"
Chart (2026)	Peak position
Romania Airplay (TopHit)	100
Russia Streaming (TopHit)	77

=== Monthly charts ===
Monthly chart performance for "Friday"
Chart (2021–2024)	Peak position
CIS Airplay (TopHit)	14
Czech Republic (Rádio – Top 100)	37
Czech Republic (Singles Digitál Top 100)	3
Lithuania Airplay (TopHit)	97
Romania Airplay (TopHit)	58
Russia Airplay (TopHit)	45
Slovakia (Rádio – Top 100)	6
Slovakia (Singles Digitál Top 100)	2

=== Year-end charts ===
2021 year-end chart performance for "Friday"
Chart (2021)	Position
Australia (ARIA)	19
Austria (Ö3 Austria Top 40)	7
Belgium (Ultratop Flanders)	2
Belgium (Ultratop Wallonia)	10
Canada (Canadian Hot 100)	45
CIS Airplay (TopHit)	41
Croatia International Airplay (Top lista)	8
Denmark (Tracklisten)	21
France (SNEP)	34
Germany (Official German Charts)	4
Global 200 (Billboard)	49
Hungary (Dance Top 40)	36
Hungary (Rádiós Top 40)	9
Hungary (Single Top 40)	20
Hungary (Stream Top 40)	7
Iceland (Tónlistinn)	31
Ireland (IRMA)	13
Italy (FIMI)	21
Netherlands (Dutch Top 40)	12
Netherlands (Single Top 100)	4
Norway (VG-lista)	35
Poland (Polish Airplay Top 100)	1
Portugal (AFP)	24
Russia Airplay (TopHit)	164
Spain (PROMUSICAE)	58
Sweden (Sverigetopplistan)	50
Switzerland (Schweizer Hitparade)	6
UK Singles (OCC)	13
US Hot Dance/Electronic Songs (Billboard)	12

2022 year-end chart performance for "Friday"
Chart (2022)	Position
Austria (Ö3 Austria Top 40)	67
Belgium (Ultratop 50 Flanders)	87
Belgium (Ultratop 50 Wallonia)	160
Germany (Official German Charts)	79
Hungary (Dance Top 40)	48
Hungary (Rádiós Top 40)	6

2023 year-end chart performance for "Friday"
Chart (2023)	Position
Romania Airplay (TopHit)	95

2024 year-end chart performance for "Friday"
Chart (2024)	Position
Lithuania Airplay (TopHit)	75
Romania Airplay (TopHit)	159

2025 year-end chart performance for "Friday"
Chart (2025)	Position
Lithuania Airplay (TopHit)	100
Romania Airplay (TopHit)	172

== Certifications ==
Certifications for "Friday"
Region	Certification	Certified units/sales
Australia (ARIA)	3× Platinum	210,000^{‡}
Austria (IFPI Austria)	3× Platinum	90,000^{‡}
Belgium (BRMA)	Gold	20,000^{‡}
Denmark (IFPI Danmark)	2× Platinum	180,000^{‡}
France (SNEP)	Diamond	333,333^{‡}
Germany (BVMI)	3× Gold	600,000^{‡}
Hungary (MAHASZ)	8× Platinum	32,000^{‡}
Italy (FIMI)	3× Platinum	210,000^{‡}
Mexico (AMPROFON)	Platinum	140,000^{‡}
New Zealand (RMNZ)	2× Platinum	60,000^{‡}
Poland (ZPAV)	4× Platinum	200,000^{‡}
Portugal (AFP)	2× Platinum	20,000^{‡}
Spain (Promusicae)	2× Platinum	80,000^{‡}
Switzerland (IFPI Switzerland)	2× Platinum	40,000^{‡}
United Kingdom (BPI)	2× Platinum	1,200,000^{‡}
United States (RIAA)	Gold	500,000^{‡}
Streaming
Greece (IFPI Greece)	Platinum	2,000,000^{†}
^{‡} Sales+streaming figures based on certification alone.^{†} Streaming-only figures based on certification alone.
