= Never Knew Love =

Never Knew Love may refer to:

- Never Knew Love (Rick Astley song) (1991)
- Never Knew Love (Oleta Adams song) (1995)
- Never Knew Love (Nightcrawlers song) (1999)
