= Nayer =

American singer

- Born: Nayer Regalado
- Genres: Latin pop; dance
- Occupation: Singer
- Years active: 2011–present
- Label: Independent

Nayer Regalado, known mononymously as Nayer, is an American singer. She gained recognition in 2011 after being featured on Pitbull's hit single "Give Me Everything", and releasing her single "Suave (Kiss Me)" featuring Pitbull and Mohombi which was a success in Europe and the Middle East. Her other known collaborations include songs with Ne-Yo, Enrique Iglesias, Lil Wayne, Usher, Fonseca, Juan Magan, Yomil (of the Cuban duo Yomil y el Dany), Jean-Roch and Melissa.

== Career ==
Nayer was discovered by Cuban-American rapper Pitbull whom she had the opportunity to do a collaboration with a few years back while signed to Sony. She immediately started working with producers on her music and songwriting. While in the process she appeared on various videos of the rapper from his albums Rebelution, Armando (2010) and Planet Pit (2011), such as "I Know You Want Me (Calle Ocho)" and "Shut It Down" (feat. Akon). She then did a joint venture with RedOne. Nayer was also featured on Enrique Iglesias' single "Dirty Dancer (Remix)" along Usher and Lil Wayne, and she held a cameo appearance in Enrique Iglesias' "I Like How It Feels" music video.

She was also a featured artist on Pitbull's smash "Give Me Everything", along with Ne-Yo and Afrojack. Nayer was nominated in 2012 for MTV Video Music Award as Best Collaboration, and up for four Latin Billboard Nominations in 2013 with "Give Me Everything", being the 2nd female to have the most Nominations.

On August 2, 2011, the singer released her single, a song titled "Suave (Kiss Me)", which features Pitbull and Swedish-Congolese singer Mohombi. She then joined as opening act Enrique Iglesias and Pitbull on the "Euphoria Tour" across the U.S., Europe and Canada.

During 2011 and 2012, Nayer was working on her debut album with RedOne but the project was never released. In 2012, a "promo" video appeared on the Internet. In this video, Nayer talked about recording her album and played snippets of 3 new songs: "Wet", "Love Drum", "Body Talk" (featuring Jason Derulo). In 2013, the full version of "Body Talk" was posted on the Internet.

In 2012, Nayer was featured in the official remix of Fonseca's single "Eres Mi Sueño" and on Jean-Roch's single "Name of Love".

After going independent in 2013, Nayer changed the direction of her album to urban. In September 2013, she announced a collaboration with rapper Detail titled "Thirsty". The song was released for free on SoundCloud.

In 2014, Nayer decided to go back to her roots. In April 2015, she filmed two music videos. In August, she announced the release of her new single "Mi Cuerpo" (and its fully English version "My Body"). The music videos for "Mi Cuerpo" and "My Body" were released on her Vevo channel on August 11, 2015. The singles were released on all the music platforms on August 14. The second music video that she filmed in the beginning of that year was for the song "Leila". In 2017, Nayer posted a teaser of the music video on her Instagram but the full video hasn't been released yet.

Spanish artist Juan Magán announced on his Twitter that he would release his collaboration with Nayer and Dasoul, produced by Daddy Yankee in "a couple of weeks". The song was released in the beginning of July 2016 as a part of his "Quiero Que Sepas" EP.

On April 14, 2017, Nayer released a new single "Yo Soy Lo Que Tu Quieres" featuring Chacal. The music video premiered on June 14.

In December 2017, Nayer appeared on AllStar 305's single "Miami Se Calienta". The music video was released on February 27, 2018.

The music video for Nayer's song "Adiccion" featuring Yomil was released on May 23, 2018.

On September 10, 2018, Nayer launched her own makeup brand.

In 2025, Nayer released two songs, "Desde la Barriga de Mami" and "Simplemente Amigos".

== Discography ==
=== Singles as lead artist ===
List of singles, with selected chart positions
| Title | Year | Peak chart positions | | | Album |
| Title | Year | CAN | FRA | SVK | Album |
|---|---|---|---|---|---|
| "Suave (Kiss Me)" (featuring Mohombi and Pitbull) | 2011 | 34 | 49 | 5 | Non-album singles |
| "Mi Cuerpo" / "My Body" | 2015 | — | — | — | Non-album singles |
| "Yo Soy Lo Que Tu Quieres" (featuring Chacal) | 2017 | — | — | — | Non-album singles |
| "Adiccion" (featuring Yomil) | 2017 | — | — | — | Non-album singles |
| "Desde la Barriga de Mami" | 2025 | — | — | — | Non-album singles |
| "Simplemente Amigos" | 2025 | — | — | — | Non-album singles |
"—" denotes a title that was not released or did not chart in that territory.

=== As featured artist ===
List of singles, with selected chart positions
| Title | Year | Peak chart positions | | | | | | | | | | | Certifications | Album |
| Title | Year | US | AUS | AUT | CAN | FRA | IRL | NL | NZ | SVK | UK | CZ | Certifications | Album |
|---|---|---|---|---|---|---|---|---|---|---|---|---|---|---|
| "Pearly Gates" (Pitbull featuring Nayer) | 2010 | — | — | — | — | — | — | — | — | 67 | — | 38 | | Pitbull Starring in Rebelution |
| "Give Me Everything" (Pitbull featuring Ne-Yo, Afrojack and Nayer) | 2011 | 1 | 2 | 2 | 1 | 2 | 1 | 2 | 2 | 2 | 1 | 3 | US: 11× Platinum; AUS: 6× Platinum; AUT: Platinum; GER: Platinum; NZ: Platinum; SWE: Platinum; SWI: Platinum; UK: 3× Platinum | Planet Pit |
| "Dirty Dancer (Remix)" (Enrique Iglesias & Usher featuring Lil Wayne and Nayer) | 2011 | 18 | 24 | 14 | 11 | 99 | 22 | — | 22 | 2 | 21 | 16 | US: Gold; AUS: Platinum; CAN: Platinum | Euphoria |
| "Name of Love" (Jean-Roch featuring Pitbull and Nayer) | 2012 | — | — | — | — | 49 | — | — | — | — | — | — | | Music Saved My Life |
| "Miami Se Calienta" (AllStar 305 featuring Osmani García, Nayer and more) | 2017 | — | — | — | — | — | — | — | — | — | — | — | | Non-album singles |
| "Leily Leily" (Melissa featuring Nayer) | 2018 | — | — | — | — | — | — | — | — | — | — | — | | Non-album singles |
| "Cada Vez Que Despiertes" (Osmani García featuring Nayer) | 2022 | — | — | — | — | — | — | — | — | — | — | — | | Non-album singles |
"—" denotes a title that was not released or did not chart in that territory.

== Guest appearances ==
List of non-single guest appearances, with other performing artists, showing year released and album name
| Title | Year | Other artist(s) | Album |
|---|---|---|---|
| "Full of Shit" | 2009 | Pitbull, Bass III Euro | Pitbull Starring in Rebelution |
| "Pearly Gates" | 2009 | Pitbull | Pitbull Starring in Rebelution |
| "Vida 23" | 2010 | Pitbull | Armando |
| "Eres Mi Sueno" | 2012 | Fonseca, Maffio | Illusion |
| "Latina En Ibiza" | 2016 | Juan Magan, Dasoul | Quiero Que Sepas |

=== List of other recorded songs ===
| Year | Song | Artist(s) | Note |
|---|---|---|---|
| 2011 | Duena De Tu Corazon | Nayer featuring El Cata | Spanish cover of Rihanna's Only Girl (In the World) |
| 2011 | Come With Me | Steve Aoki featuring Nayer | The version featuring Polina was included in Steve Aoki's album Wonderland. |
| 2012 | Love Drum | Nayer | Unreleased. Was recorded for Nayer's debut album. |
| 2012 | Wet | Nayer | Unreleased. Was recorded for Nayer's debut album. |
| 2012 | Body Talk | Nayer featuring Jason Derulo | Unreleased. Was recorded for Nayer's debut album. |
| 2013 | Chicks Like You | Nayer featuring Akon | Unreleased. Was announced as a single in 2013. |
| 2013 | Thirsty | Nayer featuring Detail & Afrojack | Was released for free on SoundCloud. |
| 2015 | Leila | Nayer | Unreleased. |
| 2016 | Se Tu Misma | Nayer featuring Yomil | Unreleased. Premiered on Ritmo 95.6 in 2016. |
| 2016 | Beautiful Life | Yomil y el Dany featuring Nayer | Unreleased. |
| 2017 | Dime | Nayer | Announced as a single in 2016. Was released as a free download on lazanocubana.com. No longer available for free download. |
