= Give Me Everything =

2011 single by Pitbull

Single by Pitbull featuring Ne-Yo, Afrojack and Nayer

from the album Planet Pit
- Released: March 18, 2011
- Studio: Wall Music BV (The Netherlands); Al Burna Studios (Miami, FL); Westlake Recording Studios (Los Angeles, CA)
- Genre: EDM; europop; hip house; pop rap; progressive house
- Length: List: 4:12 (album version without intro start) 4:34 (album version with intro start) 4:02 (radio edit / with outro verse) 3:47 (radio edit / without outro verse) 7:56 (extended vocal mix)
- Label: Polo Grounds; J; Mr. 305
- Songwriters: Armando Pérez; Nick van de Wall; Shaffer Smith
- Producers: Afrojack; DJ Buddha (co.)

Pitbull singles chronology
"Tu Cuerpo" (2011)	"Give Me Everything" (2011)	"Rabiosa" (2011)

Ne-Yo singles chronology
"One in a Million" (2010)	"Give Me Everything" (2011)	"Think Like a Man" (2012)

Afrojack singles chronology
"Take Over Control" (2010)	"Give Me Everything" (2011)	"Selecta" (2011)

Nayer singles chronology
"Pearly Gates" (2010)	"Give Me Everything" (2011)	"Dirty Dancer" (remix) (2011)

Music video
- "Give Me Everything" on YouTube

Audio sample
- file; help

"Give Me Everything" is a song by American rapper Pitbull featuring Dutch DJ Afrojack and American singers Ne-Yo and Nayer. Written by the former three and produced by Afrojack, it was released on March 18, 2011, through Polo Grounds Music, Mr. 305 Entertainment, and J Records as the second single from Pitbull's sixth studio album, Planet Pit (2011). Rolling Stone described the song as a "club-pop cut with a plaintive Ne-Yo chorus".

In the United States, "Give Me Everything" became the first number-one single on the US Billboard Hot 100 for every artist on the record except Ne-Yo, who had previously reached number-one with his own "So Sick" in 2006. It also became Pitbull's first number one in the United Kingdom as the main artist. The song has also peaked at number one in 21 countries such as Belgium, Canada, Ireland, the Netherlands, Romania and within the top-five in twelve other territories. It was the seventh best-selling digital single of 2011 with worldwide sales of 8.2 million copies, making it one of the best-selling singles of all time.

== Background and composition ==
Following "Hey Baby (Drop It to the Floor)", "Give Me Everything" is the second single from Pitbull's sixth studio album, Planet Pit, released on June 21, 2011. The song was released on March 18, 2011, through J Records. It was written by Pitbull, Ne-Yo and Afrojack (also producer), the latter two of whom are featured on the song along with Nayer.

Pitbull, Ne-Yo, and Nayer have performed the song at MTV's Spring Break 2011 in Las Vegas. According to Paul Grein of Yahoo! Music, the song combines genres of hip hop, pop, and "Broadway-style theatricality"—exemplified with the repetition of the word "tonight", reminiscent of the song of the same name from the musical West Side Story (1957). Pitbull makes references to photography company Kodak, department store Macy's, media personality Ryan Seacrest and actress Lindsay Lohan.

According to the sheet music published at musicnotes.com, "Give Me Everything" is written in the key of E♭ major, set in common time and has a tempo of 129 beats per minute. The vocals range from the low note of C_{3} to the high note of B_{♭4}.

In Daymond John’s book Powershift, Pitbull says that he wrote the song after an encounter with a Princess from Dubai at a club. When the security at the club wanted to escort the Princess away from Pitbull after giving her his number; he was inspired by the events to write that song. John backed this point up even further citing the lyrics "Take advantage of tonight, 'cause I'm off to Dubai to perform for a princess" and Pitbull's own generosity with his fans as the reason he created the song.

== Critical reception ==
"Give Me Everything" received mixed reviews from music critics. A review from NME magazine criticized Pitbull and the song for having too many random components. The review said "So, how many types of wrong is this? Well, you've got your earnest vocal gibbering about living in the moment. You've got your cheap rave wibble, a high frequency irritation that buzzes throughout like a fly trapped in jism."

== Chart performance ==
The song debuted at number 60 on the US Billboard Hot 100, on the week of April 16, 2011. In its second week, it climbed to number 17 with 112,000 copies sold: a 259% increase as a result of prominent advertising in the iTunes Store. On the week of June 26, 2011, the song peaked at number one on the chart after having spent four weeks at number two. This gave Pitbull, Afrojack and Nayer their first number-one hit in the US and Ne-Yo's first number-one song on this chart since "So Sick" in 2006. As of May 2014, the song has sold 4,874,000 copies in the US. On June 6, 2024, the single was certified Diamond by the Recording Industry Association of America (RIAA) for combined sales and streaming equivalent units of over ten million units in the United States.

On April 16, 2011, the song debuted on the Canadian Hot 100 at number 46 as the week's highest debut. It climbed to number 26 two weeks later. The song has also debuted in New Zealand at number ten, as well as on the Ultratop charts of both Belgian regions at number 35 in (Flanders) and number 42 in (Wallonia). On the Australian Singles Chart, "Give Me Everything" debuted at number fourteen and climbed to number five the next week. The song has since been certified six-times platinum by the Australian Recording Industry Association. In Austria and France, the song debuted at number 20 and number 39, respectively. In the United Kingdom, "Give Me Everything" debuted at number 35 on the UK Singles Chart on April 24, 2011. The next week it climbed ten places to number 25. Over the next two weeks it progressed from number 12 to number four. On May 22, 2011, it went up three places to number one, knocking "The Lazy Song" by Bruno Mars off the number one position, becoming Pitbull's second, Ne-Yo's fourth, and Afrojack and Nayer's first number one in the United Kingdom. In 2011, the single was the seventh best-selling digital single of year with worldwide sales of 8.2 million copies, making it one of the best-selling singles of all time.

== Lawsuit ==
On August 22, 2011, Lindsay Lohan filed a lawsuit against Pitbull, Ne-Yo and Afrojack due to the song's lyrics referencing her name. A judge ruled that Pitbull's use of her name was protected by the First Amendment and that Lohan was barely mentioned in the song. As a result, Pitbull won the lawsuit.

== Music video ==
The official music video was directed by David Roulsseau. It was released onto Pitbull's official Vevo channel on May 6, 2011. The video was filmed in the Alexandria Hotel in Los Angeles. It features an appearance by Miss Haiti 2010 Sarodj Bertin, former Girlicious member Natalie Mejia, Cheetah Girls' singer Adrienne Bailon and Russian model Eva Skaya.

As of January 2023, the video has been viewed over 1 billion times on YouTube.

== Track listing ==
- Digital download
1. "Give Me Everything" (featuring Ne-Yo, Afrojack and Nayer) – 4:16
- Digital download — remixes
1. "Give Me Everything" (Afrojack Remix) (featuring Ne-Yo, Afrojack and Nayer) – 5:40
2. "Give Me Everything" (Sidney Samson Remix) (featuring Ne-Yo, Afrojack and Nayer) – 6:35
3. "Give Me Everything" (Apster Remix) (featuring Ne-Yo, Afrojack and Nayer) – 5:50
4. "Give Me Everything" (Alvaro Remix) (featuring Ne-Yo, Afrojack and Nayer) – 6:01
5. "Give Me Everything" (R3hab Remix) (featuring Ne-Yo, Afrojack and Nayer) – 5:30
6. "Give Me Everything" (Adam F Dutch Step Remix) (featuring Ne-Yo, Afrojack and Nayer) – 4:39
7. "Give Me Everything" (Bingo Players Remix) (featuring Ne-Yo, Afrojack and Nayer) – 4:54
8. "Give Me Everything" (Jump Smokers Club Mix) (featuring Ne-Yo, Afrojack and Nayer) – 6:06
9. "Give Me Everything" (Marc Kinchen MK Dub Mix) (featuring Ne-Yo, Afrojack and Nayer) – 5:06

- CD single
1. "Give Me Everything" (Album Version) (featuring Ne-Yo, Afrojack and Nayer) – 4:16
2. "Give Me Everything" (Afrojack Remix) (featuring Ne-Yo, Afrojack and Nayer) – 5:41
- German CD single
1. "Give Me Everything" (featuring Ne-Yo, Afrojack and Nayer) – 4:16
2. "Hey Baby (Drop It to the Floor)" (AJ Fire Remix) (featuring T-Pain) – 4:23
- German CD maxi single
1. "Give Me Everything" (featuring Ne-Yo, Afrojack and Nayer) – 4:16
2. "Give Me Everything" (Afrojack Remix) (featuring Ne-Yo, Afrojack and Nayer) – 5:41
3. "Give Me Everything" (Jump Smokers Radio Mix) (featuring Ne-Yo, Afrojack and Nayer) – 5:25
4. "Give Me Everything" (R3hab Remix) (featuring Ne-Yo, Afrojack and Nayer) – 5:31
5. "Give Me Everything" (Sidney Samson Remix) (featuring Ne-Yo, Afrojack and Nayer) – 6:35

== Credits and personnel ==
- Pitbull – vocals, songwriter
- Afrojack – songwriter, producer, keyboards, MIDI programming, recording
- Dj Buddha – Arranger, co-producer
- Ne-Yo – vocals, songwriter
- Nayer – background vocals, songwriter
- Mike "TrakGuru" Johnson – Ne-Yo vocal recording
- Manny Marroquin – mixing
- Erik Madrid – mixing assistant
- Chris Galland – mixing assistant
- Darius Brown – mixing supervisor

== Charts ==
=== Weekly charts ===
2011–2013 weekly chart performance for "Give Me Everything"
Chart (2011–2013)	Peak position
Australia (ARIA)	2
Austria (Ö3 Austria Top 40)	2
Belgium (Ultratop 50 Flanders)	1
Belgium (Ultratop 50 Wallonia)	1
Brazil (Billboard Hot 100 Airplay)	13
Brazil (Billboard Hot Pop & Popular)	7
Canada Hot 100 (Billboard)	1
Canada CHR/Top 40 (Billboard)	1
CIS Airplay (TopHit)	2
Czech Republic Airplay (ČNS IFPI)	3
Denmark (Tracklisten)	2
Finland (Suomen virallinen lista)	7
France (SNEP)	2
Germany (GfK)	2
Global Dance (Billboard)	4
Greece Digital (Billboard)	3
Hungary (Rádiós Top 40)	1
Hungary (Dance Top 40)	3
Ireland (IRMA)	1
Israel International Airplay (Media Forest)	4
Italy (FIMI)	4
Japan Hot 100 (Billboard)	5
Lebanon Airplay (Lebanese Top 20)	2
Luxembourg Digital (Billboard)	1
Mexico (Billboard Mexican Airplay)	1
Mexico Anglo (Monitor Latino)	1
Netherlands (Dutch Top 40)	1
Netherlands (Single Top 100)	2
New Zealand (Recorded Music NZ)	2
Norway (VG-lista)	3
Poland Airplay (ZPAV)	3
Poland Dance (ZPAV)	2
Romania Airplay (Media Forest)	1
Russia Airplay (TopHit)	1
Scottish Singles Sales (Official Charts)	1
Slovakia Airplay (ČNS IFPI)	2
South Korea International Downloads (Gaon)	84
Spain (Promusicae)	2
Sweden (Sverigetopplistan)	2
Switzerland (Schweizer Hitparade)	2
Switzerland (Media Control Romandy)	1
Ukraine Airplay (TopHit)	86
UK Singles (Official Charts)	1
US Billboard Hot 100	1
US Adult Pop Airplay (Billboard)	19
US Dance Club Songs (Billboard)	14
US Dance Airplay (Billboard)	2
US Hot Latin Songs (Billboard)	1
US Hot R&B/Hip-Hop Songs (Billboard)	79
US Hot Rap Songs (Billboard)	4
US Pop Airplay (Billboard)	1
US Rhythmic Airplay (Billboard)	1

2023 weekly chart performance for "Give Me Everything"
Chart (2023)	Peak position
Romania Airplay (TopHit)	82

2024 weekly chart performance for "Give Me Everything"
Chart (2024)	Peak position
Portugal (AFP)	168
Romania Airplay (TopHit)	168

2025 weekly chart performance for "Give Me Everything"
Chart (2025)	Peak position
Czech Republic (Billboard)	20
Czech Republic Singles Digital (ČNS IFPI)	24
Global 200 (Billboard)	106
Latvia Streaming (LaIPA)	17
Poland (Billboard)	17
Poland (Polish Streaming Top 100)	22
Romania Airplay (TopHit)	126
Slovakia (Billboard)	20
Slovakia Singles Digital (ČNS IFPI)	26
Switzerland (Schweizer Hitparade)	62

2026 weekly chart performance for "Give Me Everything"
Chart (2026)	Peak position
Greece International (IFPI)	99
Latvia Streaming (LaIPA)	6
Lithuania (AGATA)	7
Portugal (AFP)	144
Switzerland (Schweizer Hitparade)	68

=== Monthly charts ===
2011 monthly chart performance for "Give Me Everything"
Chart (2011)	Peak position
CIS Airplay (TopHit)	3
Russia Airplay (TopHit)	1
Ukraine Airplay (TopHit)	95

2012 monthly chart performance for "Give Me Everything"
Chart (2012)	Peak position
CIS Airplay (TopHit)	26
Russia Airplay (TopHit)	22

=== Year-end charts ===
2011 year-end chart performance for "Give Me Everything"
Chart (2011)	Position
Australia (ARIA)	7
Austria (Ö3 Austria Top 40)	7
Belgium (Ultratop Flanders)	6
Belgium (Ultratop Wallonia)	4
Brazil (Crowley)	73
Canada (Canadian Hot 100)	4
CIS Airplay (TopHit)	5
Denmark (Tracklisten)	18
France (SNEP)	7
Germany (Media Control AG)	9
Greece (IFPI)	46
Hungary (Rádiós Top 40)	4
Italy (FIMI)	14
Japan (Japan Hot 100)	35
Netherlands (Dutch Top 40)	6
Netherlands (Single Top 100)	7
New Zealand (RIANZ)	8
Poland (Dance Top 50)	6
Romania (Romanian Top 100)	6
Russia Airplay (TopHit)	5
Sweden (Sverigetopplistan)	14
Switzerland (Schweizer Hitparade)	8
Spain (PROMUSICAE)	5
Spain (Spanish Top 20 TV)	10
Spain (Spanish Top 20 Airplay)	2
UK Singles (Official Charts Company)	6
US Billboard Hot 100	5
US Dance/Mix Show Airplay (Billboard)	23
US Pop Songs (Billboard)	2
US Latin Songs (Billboard)	5
US Rhythmic (Billboard)	1

2012 year-end chart performance for "Give Me Everything"
Chart (2012)	Position
Canada (Canadian Hot 100)	99
CIS Airplay (TopHit)	76
Hungary (Rádiós Top 40)	91
Russia Airplay (TopHit)	69

2025 year-end chart performance for "Give Me Everything"
Chart (2025)	Position
Belgium (Ultratop 50 Flanders)	186
Poland (Polish Streaming Top 100)	85

=== Decade-end charts ===
10s Decade-end chart performance for "Give Me Everything"
Chart (2010–2019)	Position
Australia (ARIA)	94
CIS Airplay (TopHit)	143
Russia Airplay (TopHit)	70
US Billboard Hot 100	44
US Hot Latin Songs (Billboard)	20

=== All-time charts ===
Chart (2018)	Position
UK Singles (OCC)	142

== Certifications ==
Region	Certification	Certified units/sales
Australia (ARIA)	6× Platinum	420,000^{^}
Austria (IFPI Austria)	Platinum	30,000^{*}
Belgium (BRMA)	Platinum	30,000^{*}
Canada (Music Canada)	7× Platinum	560,000^{*}
Denmark (IFPI Danmark)	3× Platinum	270,000^{‡}
Finland (Musiikkituottajat)	Gold	5,646
Germany (BVMI)	2× Platinum	1,200,000^{‡}
Hungary (MAHASZ)	13× Platinum	39,000^{‡}
Italy (FIMI)	2× Platinum	60,000^{*}
Japan (RIAJ)	Gold	100,000^{*}
Mexico (AMPROFON)	2× Platinum	120,000^{*}
New Zealand (RMNZ)	6× Platinum	180,000^{‡}
Norway (IFPI Norway)	7× Platinum	70,000^{*}
Portugal (AFP)	2× Platinum	20,000^{‡}
Spain (Promusicae)	2× Platinum	120,000^{‡}
Sweden (GLF)	5× Platinum	200,000^{‡}
Switzerland (IFPI Switzerland)	2× Platinum	60,000^{^}
United Kingdom (BPI)	4× Platinum	2,400,000^{‡}
United States (RIAA)	11× Platinum	11,000,000^{‡}
Streaming
Denmark (IFPI Danmark)	Platinum	100,000^{†}
Greece (IFPI Greece)	2× Platinum	4,000,000^{†}
^{*} Sales figures based on certification alone.^{^} Shipments figures based on certification alone.^{‡} Sales+streaming figures based on certification alone.^{†} Streaming-only figures based on certification alone.

== Release history ==
Country	Date	Format
United States	March 18, 2011	Digital download
United States	April 12, 2011	Contemporary hit radio
Germany	April 22, 2011	CD single
United Kingdom	June 3, 2011	Digital download — remixes
United States	June 3, 2011	Digital download — remixes
Germany	June 24, 2011	CD maxi single

== See also ==
- List of best-selling singles in Australia
- Billboard Top Latin Songs Year-End Chart
- List of Dutch Top 40 number-one singles of 2011
- List of Hot 100 number-one singles of 2011 (U.S.)
- List of number-one Billboard Top Latin Songs of 2011
- List of Ultratop 50 number-one singles of 2011
- List of Ultratop 40 number-one singles of 2011
- List of number-one songs of 2011 (Russia)
