= Lets Push It =

Studio album by Nightcrawlers
- Released: 25 September 1995
- Recorded: 1992–1995
- Label: Final Vinyl; Arista; BMG
- Producer: Marc Kinchen

Nightcrawlers chronology
Lets Push It (1995)	The 12" Mixes (1996)

Singles from Lets Push It
- 1. "Push the Feeling On (MK Mixes)" Released: 3 October 1994; 2. "Push the Feeling On (New MK Mixes for '95)" Released: 20 February 1995; 3. "Surrender Your Love" Released: 15 May 1995; 4. "Don't Let the Feeling Go" Released: 28 August 1995; 5. "Let's Push It" Released: 8 January 1996; 6. "Should I Ever (Fall in Love)" Released: 8 April 1996

Lets Push It (no apostrophe in Lets [sic]) is the debut album by Scottish house music project Nightcrawlers, featuring vocalist John Reid. It was originally released in 1995 on the CD and cassette formats, and was released on vinyl for the first time in 2022.

== Singles ==
The album includes two singles which reached the UK top 10: "Push the Feeling On" and "Surrender Your Love", which were both also big hits throughout Europe, plus three further singles which reached the UK top 40: "Don't Let the Feeling Go", "Let's Push It" and "Should I Ever (Fall in Love)".

== Critical reception ==
Professional ratings
Review scores
Source	Rating
AllMusic	3/5 stars
Music Week	3/5 stars
Muzik	1/5 stars

Music & Media's reviewer commented, "Kicking off with the three pop house hits in the right sequence, here's your party album of the year." A reviewer from Music Week wrote, "John Reid and his pals push their distinctive sound to the limits on this collection which included their hits with remixes by MK and Tin Tin Out."

== Track listing ==
No.	Title	Writer(s)	Length
1.	"Push the Feeling On" (MK Dub Revisited Edit)	John Reid; Graham Wilson; Hugh Brankin; Ross Campbell	4:03
2.	"Surrender Your Love"	Reid; Marc Kinchen	3:47
3.	"Don't Let the Feeling Go"	Reid; Kinchen; Ronald Wilson	3:50
4.	"Should I Ever (Fall in Love)"	Reid; R. Wilson; Stuart Crichton	4:41
5.	"Just Like Before"	Reid; Brankin; Campbell; R. Wilson	4:04
6.	"Lift Me Up"	R. Wilson; John Holiday; Trevor Steel	5:06
7.	"The World Turned"	Reid; Brankin; Campbell; R. Wilson	5:02
8.	"Let's Push It"	Reid; R. Wilson; Michael McEvoy; Stepz	5:07
9.	"I Like It"	Reid; R. Wilson; McEvoy; Stepz	4:38
10.	"All Over the World"	Reid; R. Wilson; Crichton; McEvoy	4:59
11.	"Push the Feeling On" (The Dub of Doom Mix)	Reid; G. Wilson; Brankin; Campbell	6:36
12.	"Surrender Your Love" (MK Club Mix)	Reid; Kinchen	8:23
13.	"Don't Let the Feeling Go" (Tin Tin Out Vocal Mix)	Reid; Kinchen; R. Wilson	6:46

Note

- Tracks 11–13 are listed as "Bonus tracks" on every format of the album.

== Charts ==
Chart performance for Lets Push It
Chart (1995)	Peak position
Finnish Albums (Suomen virallinen lista)	38
Scottish Albums (OCC)	45
Swiss Albums (Schweizer Hitparade)	37
UK Albums (OCC)	14
