= Jean-Roch =

French singer, DJ, producer of electronic music

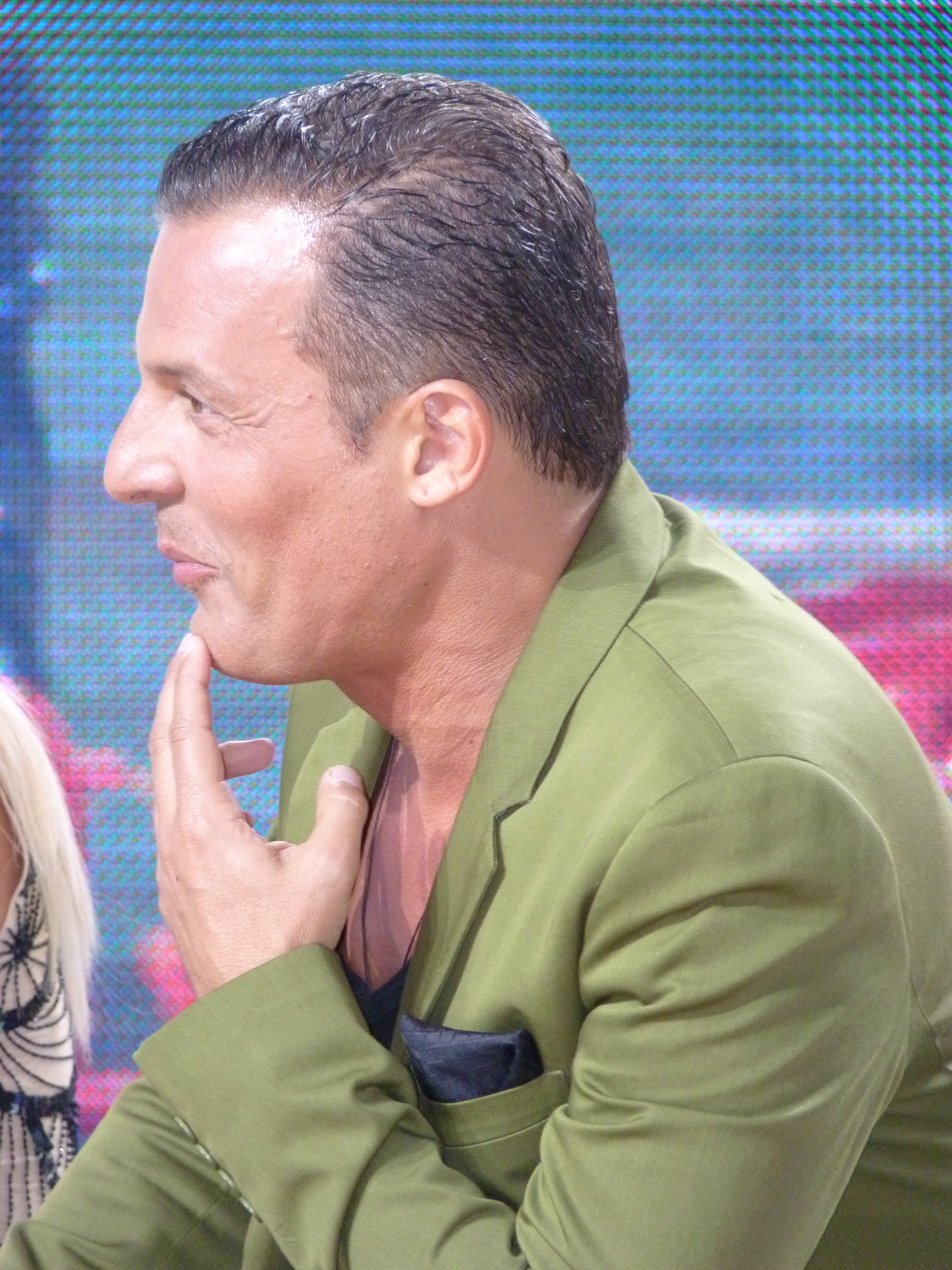
- Jean-Roch at the 2012 Cannes Film Festival.

Background information
- Also known as: Jean-Roch
- Born: Jean-Roch Pédri; 3 October 1966 (age 59)
- Origin: Toulon, France
- Occupations: DJ, record producer, remixer
- Label: John-Roch Records
- Website: www.jean-roch.com

Jean-Roch Pédri, known as just Jean-Roch (born 3 October 1966 in Toulon, France), is a French singer-songwriter and DJ/producer of electronic music and the founder of "Vip Room". He is also founder of the record label John-Roch Records.

== Career ==
While young he aspired for a sports career as a football player, but at 16 had to fold his sports plans to help in the family restaurant business.

In 2004, he released his debut single "Can You Feel It" (Arrangement from Rocky OST - "Going the Distance"), in support of the French football team in Euro 2004 held in Portugal, followed by "God Bless Rock'n'Roll" as tribute to many rock legends. In 2008 took la Scala in Paris, transforming it into a Vip Room Theater, including 3000 sq. meters of space with a boutique selling Vip Room products, the bar Hysteria and the restaurant Le Gioia.

In 2010, Jean-Roch released the single "My Love Is Over" and in May 2011 "I'm Alright" in collaboration with Kat DeLuna and Flo Rida from album Music Saved My Life, with further collaborations that included Snoop Dogg, Busta Rhymes, Pitbull, Fat Joe, Amerie, Fatman Scoop, Timati and Nayer.

== In popular culture ==
- In 2007, he hosted a summer show on Direct 8 television called Splash
- In 2011, he took part in Les Anges Gardiens on NRJ12. The program sought to train assistants to artists helping them to develop a professional career.
- The song "Can You Feel It" features prominently in the popular Chinese television show "If You Are the One".

== Discography ==
=== Albums ===
Year	Album	Charts		Certification	Notes
Year	Album	BEL (Wal)	FR	Certification	Notes
2012	Music Saved My Life	-	8		

=== Singles ===
Year	Single	Charts				Certification	Album
Year	Single	BEL (Wal)	FR	SWI	SWE	Certification	Album
2004	"Can You Feel It"	12	5	45	36		
2006	"God Bless Rock'n'Roll"	—	—	—	—		
2010	"My Love is Over"	10	7	—	—		Music Saved My Life
2011	"I'm Alright" (featuring Flo Rida and Kat DeLuna)	—	33	—	—		Music Saved My Life
2012	"Name of Love" (featuring Nayer and Pitbull)	—	49	—	—		Music Saved My Life
2012	"Saint-Tropez" (featuring Snoop Dogg)	—	—	—	—		Music Saved My Life
2012	"8 Days a Week" (featuring Timati)	—	—	—	—		Music Saved My Life
