= Melissa (singer) =

Lebanese singer (born 1982)

Melissa ميليسا
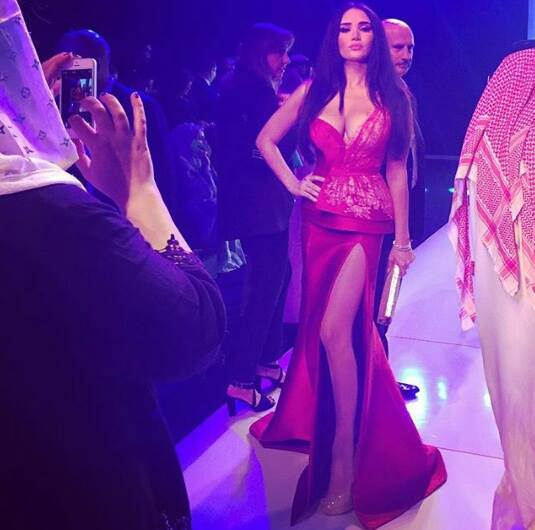

Background information
- Born: Melissa Myriam Shehab; 9 February 1982 (age 44); Baraachit, Lebanon
- Genres: Arabic pop, world
- Occupation: Singer
- Years active: 2006–present
- Labels: Rotana, Dilara Music Production, EMI

Melissa Myriam Shehab (ميليسا ميريام شهاب; born 9 February 1982), known mononymously as Melissa, is a Lebanese singer.

== Musical career ==
Melissa was discovered by music producers Fady Bitar and Jean Saliba. When Melissa released her first album, Baddi Mennak, she was signed with Alam El Phan, an Egyptian record label known for being the record label of Samira Said and Haifa Wehbe. Melissa's second album, Mfakar Halak Min, was released via her current label, Rotana Records. Her third album Min Meen Khayef, was released in 2013 under Dilara Music Production.

Internationally, Melissa is known for her collaborations with Akon in the song "Yalli Naseeni", with Dr. Alban on the songs "Habibi" (Somebody Call My Name) in 2008 and "Tell Me What U Want" (Gharamak) in 2010, Rob Dollaz in 2017 with "Aghla Min Oyouni" and Nayer in 2018 with "Leily Leily".

== Discography ==
=== Studio albums ===
Title	Album details
Baddi Mennak (I Want From You)	Released: 2006; Label: Alam El Phan; Arabic title: بدي منك; Formats: CD, streaming, digital download
Mfaker Halak Min (Who Do You Think You Are)	Released: 2008; Label: Rotana Records; Arabic title: مفكر حالك مين; Formats: CD, streaming, digital download
Min Meen Khayef (From Who Are You Afraid)	Released: 2013; Label: Dilara Music Production; Arabic title: من مين خايف; Formats: CD, streaming, digital download

=== Singles ===
==== As solo-artist ====
Title	Year	Peak chart positions	Certifications	Album
Title	Year	LBN	Certifications	Album
"Nanana" (Na Na Na)	2013	11		Min Meen Khayef
"—" denotes a title that was not released or did not chart in that territory.

==== As featured-artist ====
Title	Year	Peak chart positions	Certifications	Album
Title	Year	LBN	Certifications	Album
"Habibi" (Somebody Call My Name) aka (Baby) (Dr. Alban ft. Melissa)	2008	—		Non-album singles
