= Never Knew Love (Nightcrawlers song) =

Single by Nightcrawlers featuring John Reid
- Released: 14 June 1999
- Studio: Dreamhouse Studios
- Genre: House; UK garage; trance
- Length: 3:33
- Label: Riverhorse
- Songwriters: John Reid; Cliff Masterson
- Producer: Metro

Nightcrawlers featuring John Reid singles chronology
"Let's Push It" (1996)	"Never Knew Love" (1999)	"Push the Feeling On 2003" (2003)

Music video
- "Never Knew Love" on YouTube

"Never Knew Love" is a song recorded by British house music group Nightcrawlers and released in June 1999, by Riverhorse Records, as a single only. It is written by the group's frontman John Reid and Cliff Masterson, and produced by British producer and remixer team Metro (Brian Rawling, Graham Stack, Jeff Taylor and Mark Taylor), who produced Cher's "Believe" in 1998. In the UK, "Never Knew Love" became a top-60 hit, peaking at number 59 on the UK Singles Chart and number 54 in Scotland. It also became an club anthem of the summer of 1999, peaking at number three on the UK Club Chart.

== Critical reception ==
Upon the release, Dominic Pride from Billboard magazine complimented the song as "soul-tinged" and "Euro-friendly", noting that it would be included on an album due in September 1999. Music Week wrote, "Robin Godfrey Cass's Sony-linked Riverhorse label marks its debut with this offering from the John Reid-fronted dance act. The Rive Droite production team add Cher-associated vocoder touches to the radio mix, while mixes from Matt Darey and Colour System Inc have earned club plays."

== Track listings ==
- 12-inch vinyl, UK (1999)

A1. "Never Knew Love" (Colour System Inc Classic Vocal) — 5:51
A2. "Never Knew Love" (Cas Roc Isolation Dub 1) — 6:23
B1. "Never Knew Love" (Mash Up Matt Mix) [Edit] — 7:23

- CD single, Australia (1999)
1. "Never Knew Love" (7" Radio Edit) — 3:33
2. "Never Knew Love" (Tee's Freeze Radio Mix) — 3:30
3. "Never Knew Love" (Tee's Frozen Club Mix) — 6:27
4. "Never Knew Love" (Colour System Inc Amber Vocal) — 8:18
5. "Never Knew Love" (Mash Up Matt Mix) — 10:10
6. "Never Knew Love" (Cas Roc Isolation Dub 1) — 6:54
- CD single, Europe (1999)
1. "Never Knew Love" (7" Radio Edit) — 3:32
2. "Never Knew Love" (Tee's Freeze Radio Mix) — 3:38
- CD maxi-single, Europe (1999)
1. "Never Knew Love" (7" Radio Edit) — 3:35
2. "Never Knew Love" (Tee's Freeze Radio Mix) — 3:29
3. "Never Knew Love" (Mash Up Matt Mix) — 10:09

== Charts ==
=== Weekly charts ===
Chart (1999)	Peak position
Estonia (Eesti Top 20)	2
Scotland Singles (OCC)	54
UK Singles (OCC)	59
UK Club Chart (Music Week)	3

=== Year-end charts ===
Chart (1999)	Position
Romania (Romanian Top 100)	66
