= Pearly Gates (song) =

Promotional single by Pitbull featuring Nayer
- Released: February 1, 2010
- Recorded: 2010
- Genre: Hip house
- Length: 3:37
- Label: Polo Grounds, J
- Songwriters: Bryan Adams, Jim Vallance, Pitbull, Jim Jonsin and DJ Noodles.
- Producers: Jim Jonsin, DJ Noodles

"Pearly Gates" is a song by American recording artist Pitbull, featuring Nayer. It was released on February 1, 2010. The song was written by Pitbull, alongside the song's producers Jim Jonsin and DJ Noodles, but it is written around the Bryan Adams hit song "Heaven". The song was included as an iTunes bonus track on Pitbull's fourth studio album Pitbull Starring in Rebelution.

== Music video ==
This music video was directed by David Rousseau, and features both Pitbull and Nayer. The video is currently available from G-Pain, who is known for his viral video "Sophia Grace & Rosie meet Nicki Minaj" on YouTube, but an active upload of the music video has gained over 11.5 million views as of April 2020.

== Track listing ==
1. "Pearly Gates" – 3:22

== Charts ==
Chart (2010–11)	Peak position
Czech Republic Airplay (ČNS IFPI)	38
Slovakia Airplay (ČNS IFPI)	67

== Release history ==
Region	Date	Format	Label	Notes
United States	February 1, 2010	Digital Download	Polo Grounds, J	No longer available as of 2020
