= Shut It Down (song) =

Single by Pitbull featuring Akon

from the album Pitbull Starring in Rebelution
- Released: November 2, 2009
- Recorded: 2009
- Genre: Hip house
- Length: 3:46
- Label: Mr. 305; Polo Grounds; J; RCA
- Songwriters: Stephen Smith; Chantelle Paige; Armando Pérez; Clinton Sparks; Aliaune Thiam; William Grigahcine
- Producers: Pitbull; DJ Snake; Clinton Sparks

Pitbull singles chronology
"Outta Control" (2009)	"Shut It Down" (2009)	"Future Love" (2009)

Akon singles chronology
"On Top" (2009)	"Shut It Down" (2009)	"Oh Africa" (2010)

Music video
- "Shut It Down" on YouTube

"Shut It Down" is a song by American rapper Pitbull featuring Senegalese-American singer Akon, released by Polo Grounds Music and J Records on November 2, 2009 as the fourth single from Pitbull's album, Pitbull Starring in Rebelution (2009). A remix of the song features vocals and production from American producer Clinton Sparks.

== Music video ==
The music video was first released onto Pitbull's official Vevo channel on November 24, 2009 and was directed by David Rosseau. It has received over 35 million views. The video is about secrecy, intelligence agents and criminal activities, in which there was signed an agreement between the two groups and they agree to keep it a secret but this data is taken by agents of Pitbull in the end. Akon on the tip of information follows them but fails to capture them. The video ends with Pitbull and another woman in the plane and Akon looking at them from the ground.

== Chart performance ==
"Shut It Down" debuted at number 85 on the US Billboard Hot 100 on the chart dated December 19, 2009. In its second week, the song moved to number 83 on the chart. On the week of February 13, 2010, the single reached its peak at number 42.

In the United Kingdom, "Shut It Down" peaked on the UK Singles Chart at number 33 on the chart dated February 6, 2010. The week before, it had reached its peak at number 13 on the UK R&B Chart.

== Charts ==
=== Weekly charts ===
Chart (2009–10)	Peak position
Austria (Ö3 Austria Top 40)	35
Belgium (Ultratop 50 Flanders)	19
Belgium (Ultratop 50 Wallonia)	23
Canada (Canadian Hot 100)	23
Canada CHR/Top 40 (Billboard)	18
Finland (Suomen virallinen lista)	10
France Download (SNEP)	50
Germany (GfK)	30
Global Dance Tracks (Billboard)	32
Hungary (Dance Top 40)	8
Ireland (IRMA)	30
New Zealand (Recorded Music NZ)	25
Poland (Dance Top 50)	25
Scotland (OCC)	33
Sweden (Sverigetopplistan)	34
Switzerland (Schweizer Hitparade)	41
UK Singles (OCC)	33
UK Hip Hop/R&B (OCC)	13
US Billboard Hot 100	42
US Pop Airplay (Billboard)	29
US Digital Song Sales (Billboard)	49
US Hot Latin Songs (Billboard)	44
US Hot Rap Songs (Billboard)	17
US Rhythmic (Billboard)	18

=== Year-end charts ===
Chart (2010)	Position
Australian Singles Chart	99
Canadian Hot 100	100
Hungary (Dance Top 40)	48

== Certifications ==
Region	Certification	Certified units/sales
Canada (Music Canada)	Platinum	40,000^{*}
United States (RIAA)	Gold	500,000^{‡}
^{*} Sales figures based on certification alone.^{‡} Sales+streaming figures based on certification alone.
