= Dasoul =

Spanish singer

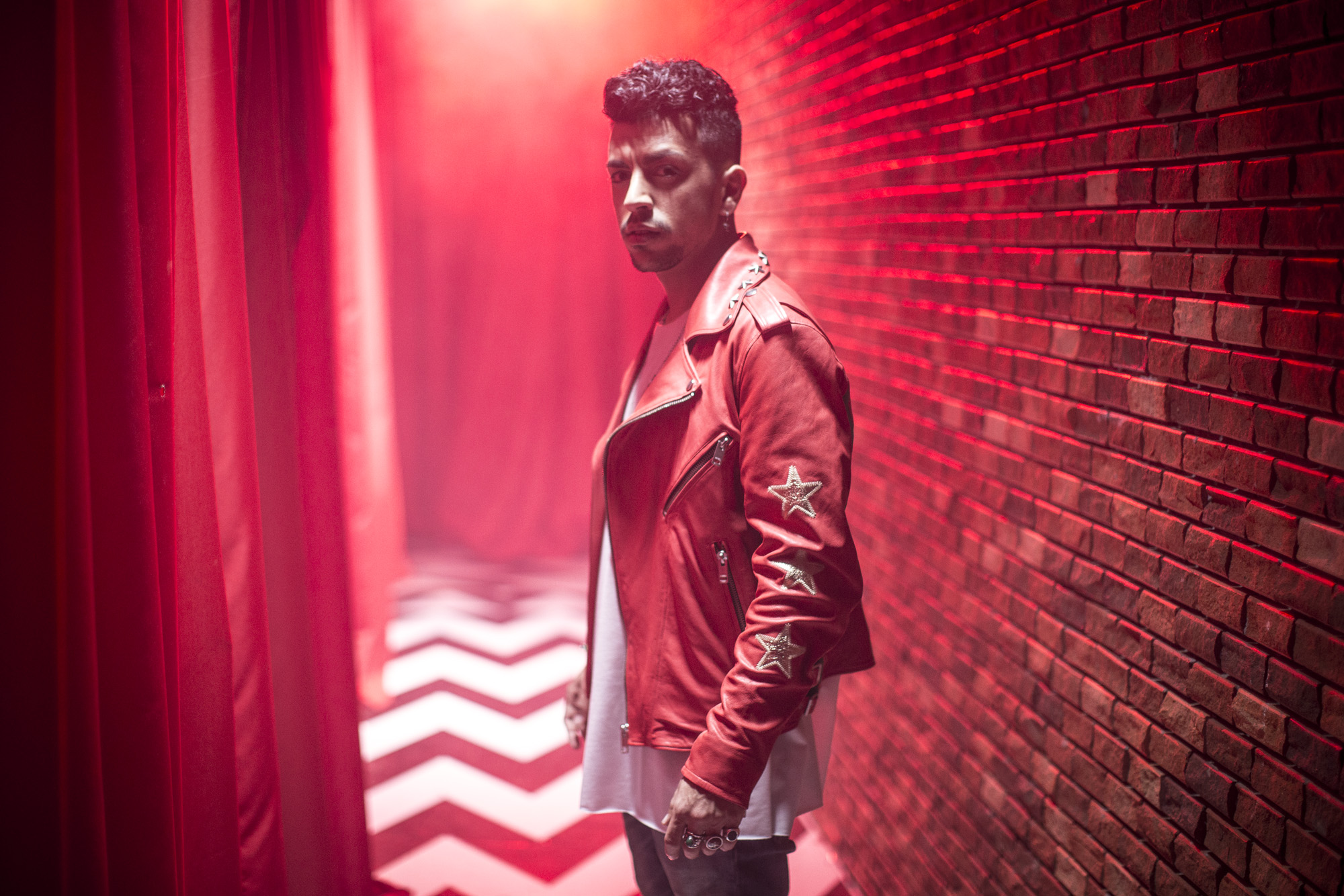
- Born: 6 February 1990 (age 36); Gran Canaria, Canary Islands, Spain
- Occupations: Singer, songwriter, live producer and producer
- Years active: 2012–present
- Musical career
- Genres: Latin music
- Instrument: Vocals
- Labels: Roster Music (2012–2019); Universal Music (Spain) (2016–2019); Vurem Bantó Creators – Altafonte (present)
- Website: www.dasoul.es

Karim El Majnaqui Talavera (Las Palmas de Gran Canaria, February 6, 1990), known professionally as Dasoul, sometimes stylized as DaSoul (born 6 February 1990), is a Spanish singer, songwriter, and producer of urban music. He rose to popularity in the mid-2010s with singles such as "Él no te da" and "Vuela corazón." After a period of inactivity in the recording industry, he returned in 2020 with the EP Dosis, awarded by LOS40 Canarias, and in 2025 he published the concept album Donde se junta el mar con el cielo, edited by his label Vurem Bantó S.L., where he explores his roots in Los Caserones (Telde).

In 2012, he was signed up by Roster Music. He has collaborated with Henry Mendez.

After releasing several singles, at the end of 2014, he launched "Él No Te Da". The track remained in the Top 10 for more than two months of the Spanish Official Singles Sales Chart. The singles have a platinum disc.

== Biography ==
In his musical career, he was known as DaSoul. Since he was a child, he was curious about the world of music and sports, although he decided to put it on the back burner. In 2011, he decided to turn his hobby (music) into his job, so he began producing and composing for various national artists. In this way, he demonstrated his talent and made a name for himself in the professional music world.

In 2012, Dasoul signed an artistic contract with Roster Music, and during that time he developed his career as a producer and composer, as well as a performer. He has worked with Fito Blanko, Maffio, Henry Mendez, Cristian Deluxe, Decai, Keymass & Bonche, among others.

His first single, titled De Lao a Lao, was released in early 2013 and became one of the most played songs in the country's clubs.

He spent the last few months of 2013 in Miami and Puerto Rico, where he worked with international producers and artists such as Fito Blanko, Maffio, Eliel, Tainy, and Luny Tunes, among others. He also expanded his knowledge and produced songs such as the remix of "De Lao A Lao," "La Bienvenida Al Amor," and "Vámonos Pa La Calle."

In mid-2014, she released "La Bienvenida Al Amor" (Gold Record) and began a promotional tour that visited the most important cities in Spain. Her song was played on the most prominent radio stations of the moment and she appeared on some leading programs.

== Rise to fame ==
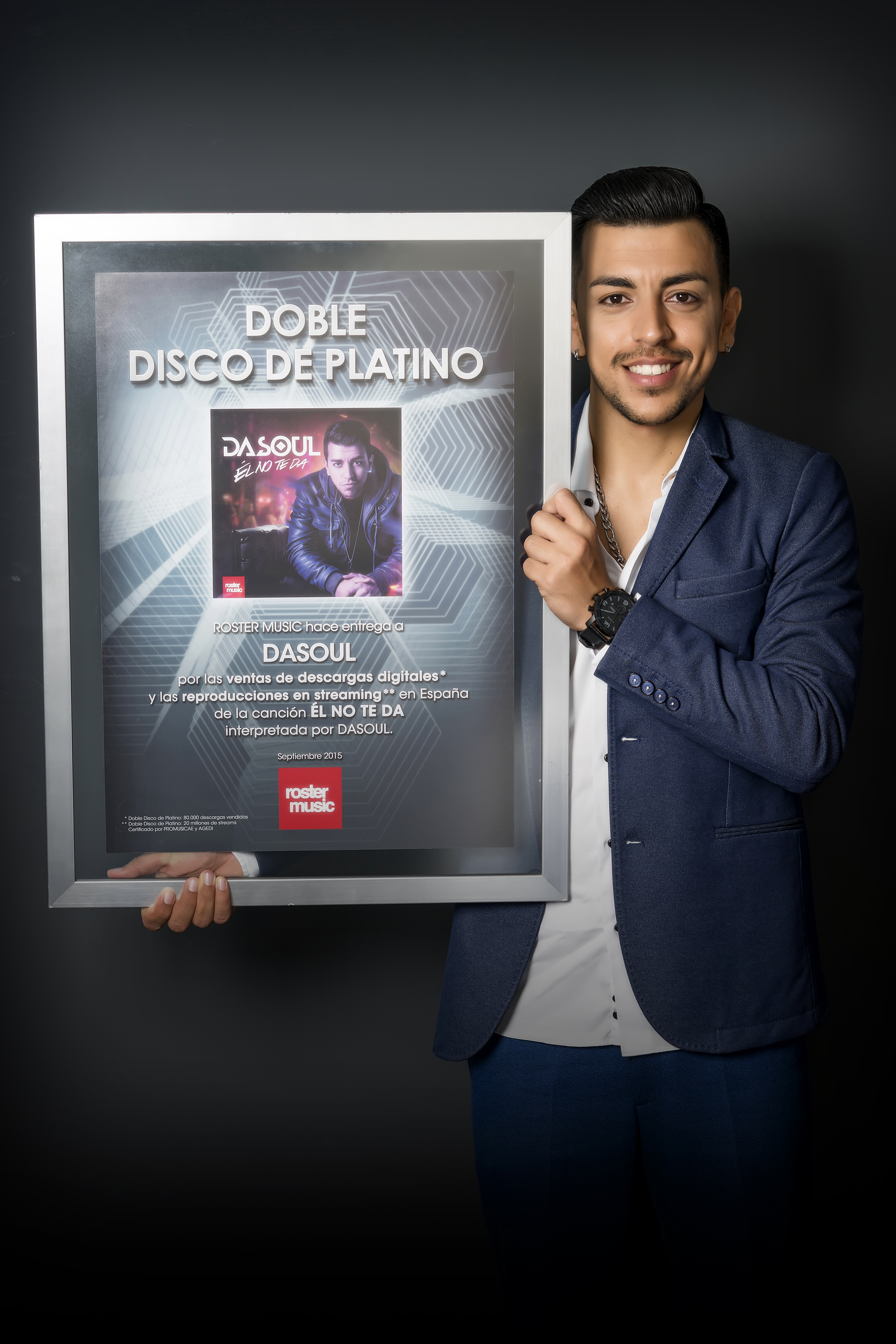
Dasoul posing with the double platinum album of Él No Te Da

In December 2014, Dasoul released Él No Te Da. The song, in the style of moombahton, became a hit, staying in the Top 10 of the Official Sales List for more than two months and achieving Double Platinum Certification. "Él No Te Da" was number 1 on Los 40 Principales Spain, and the music video has already racked up over 56 million views on YouTube. The single has been played in Central American countries (El Salvador and Guatemala) and Europe (Switzerland, France, Kosovo, Greece, Romania, and Turkey).

On the occasion of Carnival, the singer wanted to pay homage to his homeland by releasing a song dedicated to the Canary Islands, "Prometo Amarte" (Prometo Amarte) (February 2015).

In June 2015, Dasoul released "Para qué Llorar" (What to Cry?) with Keymass & Bonche.

During 2015, Dasoul performed over 114 concerts with his "El No Te Da Tour" across Spain, France, and Switzerland, and was the only Spanish artist, along with Enrique Iglesias, in the Top 10 of 2015 Annual Sales.

== Vuela Corazón ==
In March 2016, the artist from Gran Canaria released his new single, 'Vuela corazón'. a song with which he surprised us all once again thanks to his decisive commitment to the "Tropical Dance" genre, with which he gave his artistic register a new twist, confirming to the world that he was an artist in constant evolution. "Vuela Corazón" went Double Platinum in Spain. Colombians Sky & Mosty, responsible for producing many of J Balvin's hits, remixed the song.

In October 2016, Dasoul traveled to the United States again to consolidate her line of work and create her compositions with international artists and producers. She carried out various promotional activities and several work sessions with Universal Music Latin Entertainment to develop new projects. These days, Dasoul shared a recording studio and exchanged knowledge with artists such as Nacho (Chino y Nacho), Justin Quiles, Mauricio "Dandee" (Cali y El Dandee), Chino (Chino y Nacho), and Descemer Bueno, among others, and with the best producers of the urban genre such as DVLP, Nando Pro, Rvssian, Maffio, DJ Chino, Andrés Saavedra, Sky, Bull Nene...

He returned to Puerto Rico, where he had the opportunity to work with the best producers of the moment, including Chris Jeday, Los Legendarios, and Los Evo Jedis (DJ Urba & Rome).

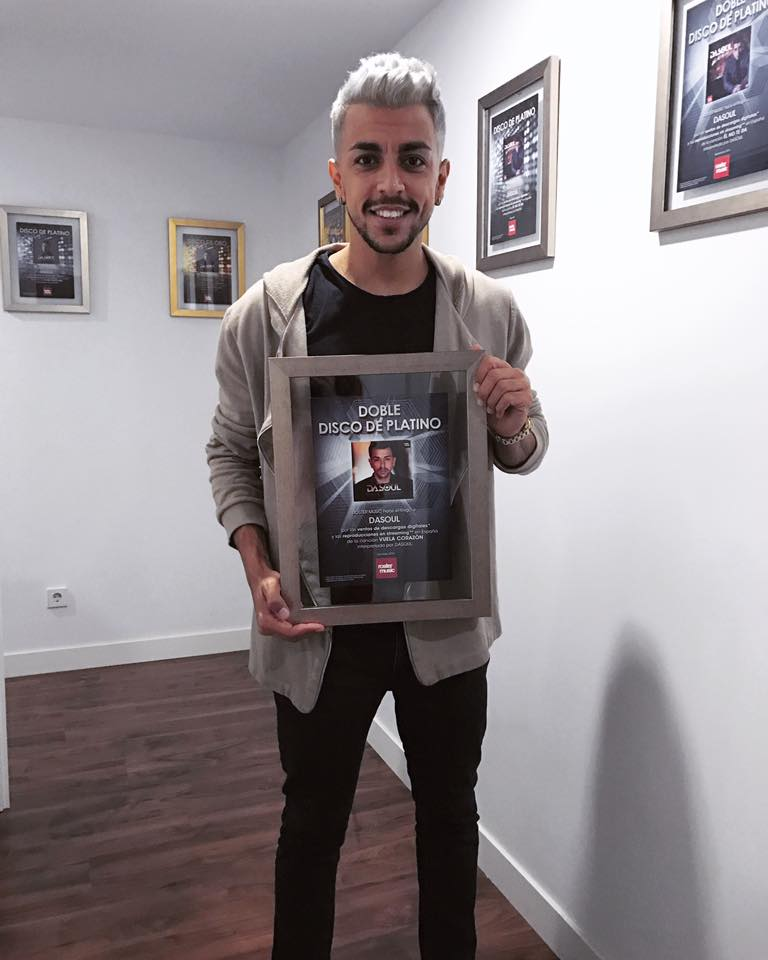
Dasoul with a double platinum record for Vuela Corazón

== Last hit before the hiatus ==
In April 2017, he released the single "Kung Fu," a song composed and performed with Nacho, former member of Chino y Nacho, the multi-platinum duo renowned for their tropical, urban, and pop styles from Latin America, and winners of unique awards such as the Latin Grammy, Billboard Latin Music Awards, and Premios Lo Nuestro. Creator of such renowned hits as "Andas en mi cabeza," "Mi Niña Bonita," and "Tu Angelito."

"Kung Fu," produced by Dasoul himself, is a fusion of Dance Hall and Reggaeton, with a very catchy chorus, making it one of the songs of the year.

After his significant live performances—more than 40 shows in 2014, more than 114 in 2015, and more than 100 in 2016—Dasoul takes a step forward with the "Dosis" tour, which begins in June 2017. During this tour, he performs with a live band, becoming one of the first urban artists nationwide to offer a concert of this nature.

== Dosis ==
In 2020, Dasoul returns to music after a three-year hiatus due to conflicts with his previous record label. He presents his new album, DOSIS, which blends funk and electronic rhythms and is currently available on all digital platforms. This EP won him the Best Album award at the 1st Click & Roll Awards (LOS40 Canarias).

== Donde Se Junta El Mar Con El Cielo ==
On June 26, 2025, he released his second studio album, Donde se junta el mar con el cielo, released by his label Vurem Bantó S.L. Conceived as a portrait of his hometown (Los Caserones, Telde), the album combines reggaeton and trap with ballads, salsa, and elements of Canarian folklore. The release included collaborations with Ciara Lauve, Wos Las Palmas, Ricky Santoro, Lemuell, Mark Dayle, and George Gimblaru, among others.

=== Reception and artistic approach ===
Spanish media highlighted the autobiographical nature and the recognition of Canarian roots. AS emphasized that the album "connects with his neighborhood" and blends genres such as trap, reggaeton, salsa, and ballads. Vozpópuli defined the work as "a return home" after a period of silence from his recording career, emphasizing the creative process and the use of technology in production. Los40 Urban and El Generacional emphasized the intention to prioritize artistic coherence over the pursuit of isolated hits.

=== Singles ===
As a preview of the album, he released "Coltas y Diamantes" (January 9, 2025), "Doble Check" with Ciara Lauve (March 13, 2025), and "Santa Catalina" (April 3, 2025). The tracks and collaborations are also featured on the official album listing on Apple Music.

=== Style and ifluences ===
In interviews from 2025, the artist described the project as a bridge between his urban beginnings and the Canarian roots that defined him, incorporating instrumentation and atmospheres from local folklore alongside reggaeton, trap, and ballads.

== Discography ==
=== Albums ===
- Si me porto mal (2015)
- Donde se junta el mar con el cielo (2025)

=== EPs ===
- Dosis (2020) — Click & Roll Award for Best Album (LOS40 Canarias).

=== Singles ===
- De Lao A Lao (2013)
- La Bienvenida Al Amor (2014)
- De Lao A Lao (No Pierdes El Break) (with Fito Blanko & Maffio, 2014)
- Vámonos pa la Calle (with Maffio, 2014)
- Déjalo (2014)
- Él No Te Da (2014)
- I Promise to Love You (2015)
- Si me misbehave (single) (2015)
- Vuela corazón (2016)
- Todas las promesas (2016)
- Kung Fu (with Nacho) (2017)
- Un clásico (with Danny Romero) (2021)
- Luz (with West Dubai) (2021)
- Sustancia (2021)
- To' y Na (2022)
- Sustancia Remix (Maikel Delacalle, Robledo, Elizalde) (2022)
- Bebo Pa Olvidarte (2022)
- Luces de Neón (2023)
- Luces de Neón (merengue version) (2023)
- Las Yales (2023)
- Noches De San Juan (2023)
- Tu Nene (2023)
- Karim (2023)
- Bokeh (2024)
- Coltas y Diamantes (2025)
- Doble Check ft. Ciara Lauve (2025)
- Santa Catalina (2025)

=== Collaborations ===
- Todos Los Latinos (with Henry Mendez, Cristian Deluxe and Charly Rodríguez, 2013)
- Amarte Más (with Henry Mendez, 2014)
- Dale (with Kiko Rivera), 2015
- Para Que Llorar (with Keymass & Bonche, 2015)
- Formentera (with Ricky Santoro, 2015)
- Pa que lo bailen en la disco (with Álvaro Guerra, 2015)
- Eres mía (with XRIZ, 2016)
- Yo Soy Su Marido (with Martín Sangar, 2016)
- Quién se van primera (with XRIZ and Danny Romero, 2017)
- A ti te cuido (Lento/Veloz) (with Tiziano Ferro)
- La calle me roba mi corazón (Bonche) (2022)
- Estoy de Rumba (2022) (XRIZ)
- Supernatural (2023) (David Cuello, DCS)
- Double Check (Ciara Lauve)
- A Scorsese Girl (Wos Las Palmas, Ricky Santoro)
- Kbrona Chemistry (Lemuell)
- Seeing Success (Mark Dayle, George Jimblaru)
- This Song (George Jimlaru)

== Awards and mminations ==
- 2015 – Nomination, Best New Artist (Spain), Los 40 Principales Awards.
- 2020 — Winner, Best Album (Dosis), Click & Roll Awards (LOS40 Canarias).
- Actuación en GH VIP (Telecinco)
- Entrevista en Morning Glory (Mediaset)

== Discography ==
=== Albums ===
| Year | Album | Peak positions | Certification |
| Year | Album | SPN | Certification |
|---|---|---|---|
| 2015 | Si me porto mal | 63 | |

=== Singles ===
| Title | Details | Peak chart positions | | Album |
| Title | Details | SPN | FRA | Album |
|---|---|---|---|---|
| 2014 | "La bienvenida al amor" | 28 | — | Si me porto mal |
| 2015 | "Él no te da" | 7 | 113 | Si me porto mal |
| 2015 | "Si me porto mal" | 26 | — | Si me porto mal |
| 2016 | "Vuela corazón" | 7 | — | |
| 2016 | "Todas las promesas" | 17 | — | |
| 2017 | "Kung Fu" (with Nacho) | 14 | — | |
| 2022 | "To' y Na'" | | | |
| 2023 | "Noche De San Juan'" | | | |
| 2023 | "Tu Nene'" | | | |
| 2025 | "Santa Catalina'" | | | |

Others

- "De lao a lao" (2013)
- "De lao a lao (No pierdes el break)" (with Fito Blanko & Maffio, 2014)
- "Vámonos pa la Calle" (with Maffio, 2014)
- "Déjalo" (2014)
- "Prometo Amarte" (2015)

=== Collaborations ===
- "Todos los Latinos" (with Henry Mendez, Cristian Deluxe and Charly Rodríguez, 2013)
- "Amarte más" (with Henry Mendez, 2014)
- "Dale" (with Kiko Rivera, 2015)
- "Para que llorar" (with Keymass y Bonche, 2015)
- Formentera (with Ricky Santoro, 2015)
- Pa que lo bailen en la disco (with Álvaro Guerra, 2015)
- Eres mía (con XRIZ, 2016)
- Yo Soy Su Marido (with Martín Sangar, 2016)
- Mamasita (with Katy Perry, 2017)
- Quién se va primero (with XRIZ y Danny Romero, 2017)
- A ti te cuido yo (Lento/Veloz) (with Tiziano Ferro)
