= Surrender Your Love =

1995 single by the Nightcrawlers

Single by Nightcrawlers featuring John Reid

from the album Lets Push It
- Released: 15 May 1995
- Genre: Deep-house; UK garage
- Length: 3:48
- Label: Final Vinyl; Arista
- Songwriters: John Reid; Marc Kinchen
- Producers: John Reid; Marc Kinchen

Nightcrawlers featuring John Reid singles chronology
"Push the Feeling On" (1992)	"Surrender Your Love" (1995)	"Don't Let the Feeling Go" (1995)

Music video
- "Surrender Your Love" on YouTube

"Surrender Your Love" is a song recorded by British house music group Nightcrawlers, released in May 1995, by Final Vinyl and Arista Records, as the second single from their only album, Lets Push It (1995). Produced by American DJ and record producer MK, the song is co-written by him with John Reid and was released shortly after the previous single, "Push the Feeling On". It became a hit in various countries, such as the UK, Finland, France and the Netherlands, where it reached the top 10. On the Eurochart Hot 100, it peaked at number 19 in June 1995. Outside Europe, the song was successful in Israel, peaking at number ten.

== Composition ==
"Surrender Your Love" is very similar in sound to "Push the Feeling On" (structure, house music sonorities, vocals), and sees singer Reid returning to a more traditional verse-chorus construction. The chorus is made out of editing syllables from the actual verses, and goes like "(Sa)-ying We Have Got/Feeling/..ying We Have/Wanna Stay". This is the typical remixing style of MK. The success of "Push the Feeling On" and "Surrender Your Love" earned Nightcrawlers an award at the 1996 Dance d'Or Awards in France.

== Critical reception ==
John Bush from AllMusic described "Surrender Your Love" as a deep-house hit. In his weekly UK chart commentary, James Masterton wrote, "The new single has more of a song structure than the last hit, owing to the presence of vocalist John Reid on the track. Another Top 3 hit could well be on the cards." Simon Price from Melody Maker described it as "aciiiedic". Pan-European magazine Music & Media commented, "The beat goes on, but no longer on FFRR. On their Arista label debut, the inventors of the "canned vibraphone" effect as further perfected by Robin S. push the feeling a little further on."

A reviewer from Music Week gave the track three out of five, adding that it "retains the familiar elements of its predecessor though this is a less striking re-invention." Brad Beatnik from the Record Mirror Dance Update gave it four out of five, writing, "Just when we've worked out the lyrics for the last hit, along comes another brainteaser. This is very much in the same mould with MK on hand again to cut up the vocal and add the inimitably simple keyboard stabs and rumbling organ and bass. This one-sided promo is equally catchy and there's no reason why it shouldn't go the same way as 'Push the Feeling On'." Another RM editor, James Hamilton, noted the "more coherently whined than 'Push the Feeling On' but similarly nagged, honked and burbled striding 122.5bpm MK Club and Dub Mixes, co-created right from scratch by Marc Kinchen this time".

== Music video ==
The accompanying music video for "Surrender Your Love" was a Box Top on British music television channel The Box in the beginning of June 1995. One month later, it was A-listed on Dutch music television channel TMF. The video was also B-listed on Germany's VIVA same month and MTV Europe put it on break out rotation in August that year. "Surrender Your Love" was later made available by Vevo on YouTube in 2014, and had generated more than 2.6 million views as of late 2025.

== Track listings ==
- CD single
1. "Surrender Your Love" (MK radio edit) — 3:51
2. "Surrender Your Love" (MK dub mix) — 6:06
- CD maxi
1. "Surrender Your Love" (MK radio edit) — 3:48
2. "Surrender Your Love" (MK club mix) — 8:24
3. "Surrender Your Love" (Wand's Crunchy nut mix) — 8:52
4. "Surrender Your Love" (MK dub mix) — 6:04
5. "Surrender Your Love" (Wand's Sugar puff mix) — 4:17

== Charts ==
=== Weekly charts ===
Chart (1995)	Peak position
Austria (Ö3 Austria Top 40)	17
Belgium (Ultratop 50 Flanders)	29
Belgium (Ultratop 50 Wallonia)	11
Europe (Eurochart Hot 100)	19
Europe (European Dance Radio)	2
Europe (European Hit Radio)	37
Finland (Suomen virallinen lista)	4
France (SNEP)	9
Germany (GfK)	27
Iceland (Íslenski Listinn Topp 40)	38
Ireland (IRMA)	14
Israel (Israeli Singles Chart)	10
Netherlands (Dutch Top 40)	8
Netherlands (Single Top 100)	10
Scottish Singles Sales (Official Charts)	21
Sweden (Sverigetopplistan)	18
Switzerland (Schweizer Hitparade)	20
UK Singles (Official Charts)	7
UK Dance (Official Charts)	1
UK Club Chart (Music Week)	7
UK Pop Tip Club Chart (Music Week)	4

=== Year-end charts ===
Chart (1995)	Position
Belgium (Ultratop 50 Wallonia)	57
Europe (Eurochart Hot 100)	55
Europe (European Dance Radio)	23
France (SNEP)	47
Netherlands (Dutch Top 40)	101
UK Club Chart (Music Week)	77
UK Pop Tip Club Chart (Music Week)	49
