= Nightcrawlers (band) =

Scottish musical group

- Origin: Glasgow, Scotland, and Chicago, Illinois, U.S.
- Genres: Acid jazz; house
- Years active: 1992–2025
- Label: Universal
- Past members: Graham Wilson; Hugh Brankin; Ronald Wilson; Ross Campbell; MK; John Reid

Nightcrawlers were a British-American house music project from Glasgow, Scotland and Chicago, Illinois, United States, assembled by producer, DJ and vocalist John Reid (6 September 1963 – June 2025).

== Career ==
=== Beginnings: 1992–1996 ===
In the early 1990s, the band Nightcrawlers was formed as a more soul and funk-influenced pop act and featured vocalist John Reid (who had some local success as a DJ and vocalist under the name Robinson Reid with acts like This Way Up in the late 1980s). The band signed to Island Records' 4th & Broadway record label and released their debut single "Living Inside a Dream", which failed to reach any commercial success. The band then decided to release a second single, "Push the Feeling On", which also failed to go Top 40 in its original acid jazz-styled version and so the band were dropped from Island records, splitting up not so long afterwards. However, "Push the Feeling On" found some success on the American dance scene and briefly crossed over to pop radio, resulting in a minor hit, peaking at No. 80 on the Billboard Hot 100, where it spent fifteen weeks on the chart (it peaked at No. 7 on the US Hot Dance Club Play chart). Most of "Push the Feeling On" success is due to the B-side, a remix by Marc Kinchen, an American record producer who has had a number of hits in the UK charts under the name MK.

Kinchen essentially reinvented the track by stripping down the song to one vocal line out of the chorus and creating an unusual sounding track around it. His version, originally entitled 'MK's Nocturnal Dub' but more famously known as 'The Dub of Doom Mix', became heavily played on the underground scene for two years in the UK, eventually reaching No. 22 on the UK singles chart in October 1994 when it was commercially released. In 1995, MK created new mixes for the track and the single was once again re-released, this time licensed to London's ffrr dance label. It peaked at No. 3 on the UK Singles Chart, becoming Nightcrawlers' biggest hit in the United Kingdom.

Reid then signed to BMG as a solo artist under the Nightcrawlers name, with his records being issued on the new Final Vinyl imprint through Arista Records. Reid released four further consecutive singles, all featuring remixes by MK. "Surrender Your Love" peaked at No. 7, "Don't Let the Feeling Go" peaked at No. 13, "Let's Push It" peaked at No. 23 and "Should I Ever (Fall in Love)" peaked at No. 34. In September 1995, Reid released an album containing all six singles he had previously released, using Lets Push It as the title. MK once again worked closely with Reid, repeatedly remixing tracks to his trademark sound. In 1996, Reid released a remixed version of the album, entitled The 12" Mixes: An Album of the Very Best Club Remixes. In the same year, Reid released the single "Keep Pushing Our Love" featuring soul singer Alysha Warren, which peaked at No. 30, intended to be the lead single from a second studio album. However, due to poor sales of the single, a second album never materialised.

=== Current work: 1999–2025 ===
In an attempt to revive Nightcrawlers, Reid released a single entitled "Never Knew Love" in 1999. However, it failed to achieve any commercial success and as such, no further releases appeared until 2004, when underground artists JCA and Rosabot released a collaborative remix single of Reid's hit "Push the Feeling On". It re-entered the U.S. Dance Chart, this time peaking at number 1. Elated with the success of the remixes, Reid once again began recording material for a possible second album. In 2011, the first single from the second album, "Cryin' Over You", was released in the United Kingdom and Germany. It features vocals from British singer Taio Cruz.

In 2018, John Reid released an EP titled The Nightcrawlers Soul Sessions, which included a soul version of "Push the Feeling On" and a version of the track with Big Narstie as a bonus. It also featured "All Night Long", which came with remixes by Russell Small of Freemasons and Phats & Small fame.

In 2021, the MK remix of "Push the Feeling On" was sampled by British producer Henry 'Riton' Smithson, who had teamed up with social media stars Mufasa and Hypeman to record the track, called "Friday". Credited to Riton X Nightcrawlers featuring Mufasa and Hypeman, the record was issued by Sony's Ministry of Sound Recordings and entered the UK singles chart at number 60 on 22 January 2021 and eventually reached the top 5.

After appearing in the video for "Friday", Reid went on to provide vocals on producer Kevin Christie's follow-up to "Rasputin" (a remix/revamp of the Boney M. song which he - Majestic - took into the Top 20 of the UK singles chart). The new collaborative single was released by Ministry of Sound Records and called "Losing My Mind", with the artist credit typeset as Majestic X Nightcrawlers.

John Reid's death was announced on 16 June 2025. He was 61.

== Solo work ==
Reid was a successful songwriter in his own right, having co-written a UK chart-topping single for Westlife ("Unbreakable"), Tina Turner's 1999 hit-single "When the Heartache Is Over" and also songs for Rod Stewart. He was a friend of Simon Cowell, and he co-wrote the Kelly Clarkson and Leona Lewis hit "A Moment Like This". He has worked as a songwriter for the Spanish singer Mónica Naranjo, with songs including "No Voy A Llorar", "If You Leave Me Now" and "Hotline", he also worked with Ian Levine, in "Whenever You Need Someone" (Bad Boys Inc), and tracks for Eternal, Gemini, Claire Richards for "My Heart Is Heading Home (This Christmas)" track and Optimystic.

Ross Campbell is a lecturer at the Royal Conservatoire of Scotland.

== Discography ==
=== Studio albums ===
List of albums, with selected details and chart positions
Title	Album details	Peak chart positions		
Title	Album details	UK	FIN	SWI
Lets Push It	Released: 25 September 1995; Format: CD	14	38	37

=== Remix albums ===
- The 12" Mixes (1996)

=== Singles ===
Year	Title	Peak chart positions											Certifications (sales thresholds)	Album
Year	Title	UK	AUS	AUT	BEL (FL)	BEL (WA)	FRA	GER	IRE	NED	SWE	SWI	Certifications (sales thresholds)	Album
1992	"Living Inside a Dream"	82	—	—	—	—	—	—	—	—	—	—		Non-album singles
1992	"Push the Feeling On"	86	—	—	—	—	—	—	—	—	—	—		Non-album singles
1994	"Push the Feeling On" (MK Mixes)	22	—	—	—	—	—	—	—	—	—	—		Lets Push It
1995	"Push the Feeling On" (New MK Mixes for '95)	3	62	15	7	3	7	6	4	6	3	7	BPI: Platinum	Lets Push It
1995	"Surrender Your Love"	7	—	17	29	11	9	27	14	10	18	20		Lets Push It
1995	"Don't Let the Feeling Go"	13	—	—	46	24	—	—	26	—	30	25		Lets Push It
1996	"Let's Push It"	23	107	—	35	33	—	—	30	—	41	—		Lets Push It
1996	"Should I Ever (Fall in Love)"	34	—	—	—	—	—	78	—	—	—	—		Lets Push It
1996	"Keep Pushing Our Love" (featuring Alysha Warren)	30	—	—	—	—	—	—	—	—	—	—		Non-album singles
1999	"Never Knew Love"	59	—	—	—	—	—	—	—	—	—	—		Non-album singles
2003	"Push the Feeling On 2003"	—	—	—	—	—	—	64	—	—	—	—		Non-album singles
2007	"Push the Feeling On 2007"	82	—	—	—	—	—	—	—	—	—	—		Non-album singles
2011	"Cryin' Over You" (featuring Taio Cruz)	—	—	—	—	—	—	—	—	—	—	—		Non-album singles
2012	"Push the Feeling On 2k12" (with Glamrock Brothers & Sunloverz)	—	—	—	—	—	—	100	—	—	—	57		Non-album singles
2021	"Friday" (with Riton featuring Mufasa & Hypeman)	4	12	5	1	2	21	3	3	3	23	2	BPI: 2× Platinum; ARIA: 3× Platinum	Non-album singles
2021	"Losing My Mind" (with Majestic)	—	—	—	—	—	—	—	—	—	—	—		Non-album singles
"—" denotes releases that did not chart

== See also ==
- List of number-one dance hits (United States)
- List of artists who reached number one on the US Dance chart
- List of Eurodance artists
