= Ross Campbell (composer) =

Scottish composer

- Education: Royal Conservatoire of Scotland; Royal College of Music
- Occupations: Composer; songwriter

Ross Campbell is a Scottish composer and songwriter. He is possibly best known for his score for the short film Poor Angels which earned him a Best Composer nomination at the 1996 BAFTA Scotland Awards.

== Life and career ==
Ross Campbell studied composition as the prestigious Royal College of Music in London and further enhanced his studies at the Royal Scottish Academy of Music and Drama (now Royal Conservatoire of Scotland) in Glasgow. Upon leaving university, Ross pursued a career in commercial music and worked with many bands including Nightcrawlers in which he co-wrote the song "Push the Feeling On" which enjoyed success on both sides of the Atlantic selling over 750,000 copies in the United States alone. In the mid-1990s, Campbell began working as a composer for film and television. In 1996, he composed the music for the short film Poor Angels which starred Peter Mullan in the lead role. The score earned Campbell a nomination at the 1996 BAFTA Scotland Awards. On the small screen, Campbell provided music for shows such as Missing and the long running crime series Taggart.

In 2017, under the moniker Mondorosco, he released the album Kompass Strasse. His writing credits include hit records for artists such as Riton, French Montana, AJ Tracey and Big Narstie.

Ross was a lecturer at RCS and Glasgow Kelvin College.

== Filmography ==
=== Film ===
Year	Film	Director(s)	Notes
1997	Poor Angels	Ian Madden	Short film
2014	Death Knight Love Story	Hugh Hancock	Short film
2014	Glory Hunter	Craig Maclachlan	Short film
2014	K'Nibble	Andrew Dobbie	Short film
2015	Prescription R	Andrew Dobbie	Short film
2016	Lucky Break	Andrew Dobbie; Tobias Erdmann	Short film
2016	The Land of Time	Emma Skeldon	Short film
2020	Autumn Never Dies	Chris Quick	Short film

=== Television ===
Year	Title	Director(s)	Notes
2002–2005	Taggart	Various	9 episodes
2006	Missing	Ian Madden	TV film
2015	Fanatic	Luke Aherne	TV pilot

== Discography ==
Year	Album	Release date	Peak chart position	
Year	Album	Release date	US	UK
2017	Kompass Strasse	31 March 2017	—	—

== Awards and nominations ==
Year	Nominated Work	Award	Category	Result
1996	Poor Angels	British Academy Scotland Awards	Best Composer	Nominated
2020	Autumn Never Dies	Top Indie Film Awards	Best Music	Nominated
2022	Autumn Never Dies	Scotland International Festival of Cinema	Alan Parsons Award for Best Original Score for a Featurette	Pending
