= Push the Feeling On =

1992 single by Nightcrawlers

- Cover art of Marc Kinchen's 1995 remix.

Single by Nightcrawlers & MK

from the album Lets Push It
- Released: 1992
- Genre: Acid jazz (original); house (1995 version)
- Length: 3:29 (1995 mix); 4:04 (MK Dub Revisited edit)
- Label: 4th & B'way; Island; FFRR (1995)
- Songwriters: Ross Campbell; John Reid; Hugh Brankin; Graham Wilson
- Producers: Ian Morrow; Phil Chill; Marc Kinchen (MK mixes)

Nightcrawlers & MK singles chronology
"Living Inside a Dream" (1992)	"Push the Feeling On" (1992)	"Surrender Your Love" (1995)

Music video
- "Push the Feeling On" on YouTube

"Push the Feeling On" is a house song by the British music group Nightcrawlers and American DJ Marc Kinchen (MK). The original version released in 1992 was also partially disco and acid jazz-influenced and was a minor chart hit in the United Kingdom. The song was later remixed extensively by Kinchen, creating a series of additional remixes for the song. One remix known as "Push the Feeling On (MK Dub Revisited Edit)" became an international chart hit in 1995, peaking at number three on the UK Singles Chart and peaking within the top ten of the charts in other various European countries. The accompanying music video, featuring different characters inside a photo booth, received heavy rotation on European music television channels.

In the wake of its success, the band deleted the original version from their catalogue, reclassified the remix as the first single from their debut album, Lets Push It (1995), and changed their genre to house music. Despite the Nightcrawlers' Scottish origin, the song was actually less popular in Scotland than in the UK as a whole (and many worldwide markets), only peaking at number 11, mainly owing to the more subtle and low-key style of the track, which differentiated it from the dance music popular in Scotland at the time such as bouncy techno. On the Eurochart Hot 100, "Push the Feeling On (MK Dub Revisited Edit)" reached number five.

== Background and release ==
=== Original song ===
The original song was initially issued in the United Kingdom in 1992. The song reached No. 86 in the UK charts, before quickly falling off. A similar effect happened with the reissue in the US when it was released there in 1993, reaching No. 80 on the Billboard Hot 100. The success of the 92/93 version in the US was based on the Dub of Doom remix by Marc Kinchen who only used 1 verse of the song to build the remix. The song itself was rooted in acid jazz and disco, and the vocalist of the band John Reid noted later it was quite out of date for the time.

=== Marc Kinchen remixes ===
"A bit of justice after all the hard work. It was two and a half years into the process before I saw the light at the end of the tunnel. It surely has taken an amount of time to come around again. I can't take all the credit for the hit that Push The Feeling On has eventually become. Marc [Kinchen] deserves to get that. The original version was a quite out-of-date sounding R&B track; Marc brought it into the '90s. He only used that one vocal line out of the chorus, that nobody seems to get—namely 'your lies will pull us through'—in a very striking manner."

— John Reid talking to Music & Media about the sudden success of the song.

The original 1992 version's B-side was a remix by a new producer named Marc Kinchen. Known originally as "MK's Nocturnal Dub", the remix was renamed "Push the Feeling On (The Dub of Doom)" for its US release. This remix was a hit in the underground scene in the UK, being heavily played for around two years, until the same remix was later released as a single in 1994 in Europe. It proved to be a greater success than the original, reaching No. 22 in the UK charts, and No. 76 in the Eurochart Hot 100.

A later issue, entitled "Push the Feeling On (New MK Mixes For '95)" with a revised remix from Kinchen entitled the "MK Dub Revisited Edit" solidified the potential of the song - proving to be such a great commercial success internationally that it replaced the original song in both the minds of the public and the band, who subsequently focused on house music for the rest of their career, and deleted the original version from their catalogue, subsequently using the new remix on their debut album, Let's Push It and all subsequent releases.

=== Later remixes ===
In 2003 and 2007, the song was released again, in other remixed versions.

"Push the Feeling On 2014" was credited to Nightcrawlers vs DJ S.K.T. and appeared on various house music compilation albums and broke the top 40 of the UK iTunes chart.

In 2017, a garage version simply titled "Push the Feeling" credited to Nightcrawlers x John Reid featuring Big Narstie was released, alongside a lyric video. The official music video followed in 2018, in which Reid made cameo appearances.

The original CD single release (catalogue no. BRCD 258/864491-2) credits John Reid as 'Jon Reed'. The 1995 release "New MK Mixes for '95" (UK cat. FCD 257, international cat. 854 275-2) credits John Reid as 'J. Reed'.

== Critical reception ==
=== Original song ===
Larry Flick from Billboard magazine wrote, "Dance act is making quick club inroads with this delightfully retro romp. A chunky, midtempo groove is dressed in snakey funk guitar licks, bright horn thrushes, and pulses of strings. Radio viability comes from the song's traditional structure and a contagious hook. Bolstered by prerelease interest on European import, cool track has the makings of a multiformat hit. Not to be missed." A reviewer from Lennox Herald described it as "confident sassy soul with good hook and chorus." James Hamilton from Music Week's RM Dance Update commented that "the soulful John Reed led Glaswegians get really classy with this Seventies-style chantingly harmonized joyful swirling and soaring brassy jiggler".

=== Marc Kinchen remix ===
Scottish Aberdeen Press and Journal called the song "infectious". AllMusic editor John Bush deemed it a deep-house hit and a house anthem. Larry Flick from Billboard stated that "Push The Feeling On" "is one of those records that simply will not go away." He noted Marc "M.K." Kinchen's "sinewy rhythms" of the remix. In his weekly UK chart commentary, James Masterton said, "With hindsight it is easy to see why, as it is one of those dance hits to rank alongside the Source's 'You Got The Love' and Robin S's 'Show Me Love' - a simple but insistent rhythm upon which is built layer after layer of production to reach a rousing climax... watch it go Top 3." In September 1994, Ben Turner from Melody Maker stated, "Proof that, on its day, pure "house" is still the saviour of contemporary music." Pan-European magazine Music & Media wrote, "Third time lucky for the Brits who finally score a hit at home with the MK Dub Revisited Edit. In fact they're the creators of that "canned vibraphone" sound as popularised by Robin S." James Hamilton from Music Week's RM Dance Update described it as "a bouncily honking and jolting infectious 121.8bpm beefy strider that chops up Jon Reed's vocal into almost continuously looped gibberish lacking any quotable hook". Iestyn George from NME commented, "Curious reissue of this 1994 favourite, faithfully deconstructed by Mark Kinchen, retaining the garage-friendly sparkle of the original with neatly layered vocal samples and sparse, skipping rhythms. Pruning the track's soulier overtones, this proves that less can, indeed, be more."

The remix was present on many retrospective top ranking lists of the best dance singles of the 90s, including Mixmag's "The 100 Best Dance Singles of All Time", MTV's "The 100 Biggest 90's Dance Anthems of All Time" and Vibe's "Before EDM: 30 Dance Tracks from the '90s That Changed the Game". The success of "Push the Feeling On" and its follow-up "Surrender Your Love" also earned the group an award at the 1996 Dance d'Or Awards in France.

== Music video ==
A music video was produced to promote the Marc Kinchen version. It takes place inside of a photo booth and shows different characters entering, posing, having pictures taken and leaving. One of them is John Reid, performing his one vocal line. "Push the Feeling On" was a Box Top on British music television channel The Box for 8 weeks from April 1995. In June, it received heavy rotation on MTV Europe and was A-listed on Germany's VIVA. Two months later, the video was A-listed on France's MCM.

== Track listings ==
- Original song
1. "Push the Feeling On" (radio mix) – 3:32
2. "Push the Feeling On" (extended mix) – 6:48
3. "Push the Feeling On" (MK's nocturnal dub) – 6:22
4. "Push the Feeling On" (MK's Deep Dawn mix) – 5:00
- MK Mixes
1. "Push the Feeling On" (Dub of Doom) (Short) – 3:36
2. "Push the Feeling On" (The Dub of Doom) – 6:41
3. "Push the Feeling On" (Dub of Doom DDT '94 Edit) – 7:00
- New MK Mixes for '95
1. "Push the Feeling On" (MK dub revisited edit) – 4:04
2. "Push the Feeling On" (The Dub of Doom) – 6:39
3. "Push the Feeling On" (MK dub revisited) – 7:03
4. "Push the Feeling On" (MK mix 95) – 7:06

== Charts ==
=== Weekly charts ===
Chart (1992–1993)	Peak position
Canada Dance/Urban (RPM)	2
UK Singles (OCC)	86
UK Dance (Music Week)	21
UK Club Chart (Music Week)	4
US Billboard Hot 100	80
US Hot Dance Club Play (Billboard)	7
US Maxi-Singles Sales (Billboard)	9
US Rhythmic Top 40 (Billboard)	37
US Cash Box Top 100	73

==== Year-end charts ====
Chart (1993)	Position
Canada Dance/Urban (RPM)	19
UK Club Chart (Music Week)	89
US Maxi-Singles Sales (Billboard)	32

=== Marc Kinchen remix ===
==== Weekly charts ====
Chart (1994)	Peak position
UK Club Chart (Music Week)	6

Chart (1995–1996)	Peak position
Australia (ARIA)	62
Austria (Ö3 Austria Top 40)	15
Belgium (Ultratop 50 Flanders)	7
Belgium (Ultratop 50 Wallonia)	3
Denmark (IFPI)	10
Europe (Eurochart Hot 100)	5
Europe (European Dance Radio)	13
Finland (Suomen virallinen lista)	11
France (SNEP)	7
Germany (GfK)	6
Ireland (IRMA)	4
Israel (Israeli Singles Chart)	27
Netherlands (Dutch Top 40)	4
Netherlands (Single Top 100)	6
Scottish Singles Sales (Official Charts)	11
Spain (AFYVE)	2
Sweden (Sverigetopplistan)	3
Switzerland (Schweizer Hitparade)	7
UK Singles (Official Charts)	3
UK Dance (Official Charts)	1
UK Airplay (Music Week)	38
UK Club Chart (Music Week)	5
UK Pop Tip Club Chart (Music Week)	4
Zimbabwe (ZIMA)	1

==== Year-end charts ====
Chart (1995)	Position
Belgium (Ultratop 50 Flanders)	44
Belgium (Ultratop 50 Wallonia)	15
Europe (Eurochart Hot 100)	29
France (SNEP)	31
Germany (Media Control)	37
Latvia (Latvijas Top 50)	80
Netherlands (Dutch Top 40)	40
Netherlands (Single Top 100)	63
Sweden (Topplistan)	36
Switzerland (Schweizer Hitparade)	13
UK Singles (OCC)	56

=== Other versions ===
==== Weekly charts ====
Chart (2003–2004)	Peak position
Germany (Media Control AG) 2003 remix	64
Hungary (Dance Top 40) 2003 remix	26
US Hot Dance Club Play (Billboard) Rosabel & JCA mixes	1

==== Year-end charts ====
Chart (2004)	Position
US Hot Dance Club Play (Billboard)	7

== Certifications ==
=== Marc Kinchen remix ===
Region	Certification	Certified units/sales
United Kingdom (BPI)	Platinum	600,000^{‡}
^{‡} Sales+streaming figures based on certification alone.

== Impact and legacy ==
The MK version of the track has been extensively sampled and covered:

- In 2009, Pitbull sampled the track for "Hotel Room Service".
- In 2020, AJ Tracey sampled the track for "Dinner Guest" featuring MoStack which reached the UK top 10 singles chart.
- Nightcrawlers and Riton collaborated to release "Friday" in 2021, which samples "Push the Feeling On" and features Mufasa & Hypeman.
- In 2024, Nemo sampled the track for their Felix Jaehn remix of The Code

=== Accolades ===
==== For "Push the Feeling On (MK Dub Revisited Edit)" ====
Year	Publisher	Country	Accolade	Rank
1996	Mixmag	United Kingdom	"The 100 Best Dance Singles of All Time"	72
1998	DJ Magazine	United Kingdom	"Top 100 Club Tunes"	93
2011	The Guardian	United Kingdom	"A History of Modern Music: Dance"	*
2011	MTV Dance	United Kingdom	"The 100 Biggest 90's Dance Anthems of All Time"	100
2013	Vibe	United States	"Before EDM: 30 Dance Tracks from the '90s That Changed the Game"	5
2019	Defected	United Kingdom	"17 Best Remixes Ever: Defected HQ Picks"	*
2022	Pitchfork	United States	"The 30 Best House Tracks of the ’90s"	*

(*) indicates the list is unordered.

== In popular culture ==
Since 2022, the melody of "Push the Feeling On" has been used in advertising for UK automobile selling website We Buy Any Car.

== See also ==
- List of number-one dance singles of 2004 (U.S.)
