= Melissa Etheridge discography =

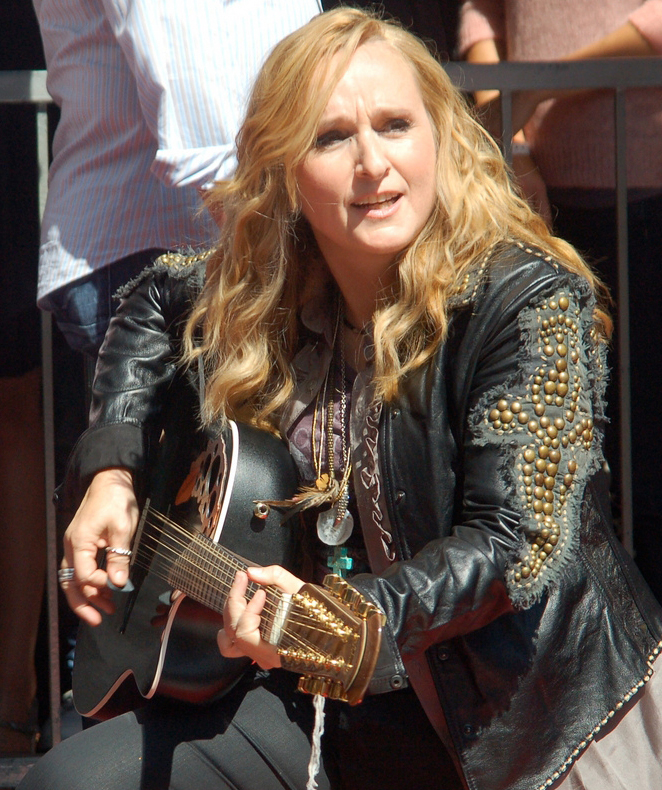
- Etheridge performing in 2011
- Studio albums: 17
- Extended plays: 3
- Soundtrack albums: 7
- Live albums: 5
- Compilation albums: 2
- Singles: 43
- Video albums: 3
- Music videos: 38
- Miscellaneous: 11

This is a comprehensive listing of official releases by American singer-songwriter Melissa Etheridge. She has released 17 studio albums, 43 singles and 38 music videos on Island Records, Universal Music Group, ME Records, and BMG. Over the course of her career, she has amassed five Platinum albums, three of which are multi-platinum, and two Gold albums. She also has 11 Billboard Hot 100 charting singles, with six of them hitting the Top 40, and 11 Billboard Adult Contemporary charting singles, all peaking in the Top 40. According to the Recording Industry Association of America, she has sold 13 million certified albums in the United States.

Etheridge was signed to Island Records by Chris Blackwell and released her debut album, Melissa Etheridge, in 1988. Her second album, Brave and Crazy, appeared the following year. Etheridge released her third album, Never Enough, in 1992. The following year, she released what would become her mainstream breakthrough album: Yes I Am. Its tracks "I'm the Only One", "Come to My Window", and "If I Wanted To" all reached the Top 40 in the United States, while the album spent 138 weeks on the Billboard 200, peaking at No. 15, and earned a RIAA certification of 6× Platinum, her largest selling album to date. Her fifth album, Your Little Secret, was released in 1995 and peaked at No. 6 on the Billboard 200, her highest charting album to date. The album went 2× Platinum, and its tracks "I Want to Come Over" and "Nowhere to Go" both reached the Top 40. Her sixth album, Breakdown, was released in 1999 and reached No. 12 on the Billboard 200. The album went Gold, and its lead single, "Angels Would Fall", reached No. 51 in the United States.

Her seventh and eighth studio albums, Skin and Lucky, appeared in 2001 and 2004, respectively. Her first compilation album, Greatest Hits: The Road Less Traveled, was released in 2005 and became a great commercial success, going Gold, while it reached No. 14 on the Billboard 200. The Awakening was released in 2007 and her first Christmas album, A New Thought for Christmas, appeared the following year. Her last albums for Island Records, Fearless Love and 4th Street Feeling, appeared in 2010 and 2012, respectively. Etheridge formed her own record label, ME Records, and released her 13th album This Is M.E. in 2014. MEmphis Rock and Soul appeared in 2016, followed by The Medicine Show in 2019. Her most recent studio album is Rise (2026).

== Albums ==
=== Studio albums ===
List of studio albums, with selected peak chart positions and certifications
Year	Title	Chart positions										Certifications
Year	Title	US	AUS	AUT	BEL	GER	NLD	NZ	SWE	SWI	UK	Certifications
1988	Melissa Etheridge: Released: May 2, 1988; Label: Island; Formats: LP, CD, cassette	22	3	16	—	36	9	—	48	—	—	RIAA: 2× Platinum; ARIA: Platinum; BVMI: Gold; CRIA: 3× Platinum; RMNZ: Platinum
1989	Brave and Crazy: Released: September 11, 1989; Label: Island; Formats: LP, CD, cassette	22	9	14	—	7	—	—	40	7	63	RIAA: Platinum; ARIA: Platinum; CRIA: 2× Platinum; RMNZ: Gold
1992	Never Enough: Released: March 17, 1992; Label: Island; Formats: LP, CD, cassette	21	8	7	—	12	38	—	—	12	56	RIAA: Platinum; CRIA: Platinum
1993	Yes I Am: Released: September 21, 1993; Label: Island; Formats: LP, CD, cassette	15	39	22	—	31	2	20	—	17	—	RIAA: 6× Platinum; CRIA: 2× Platinum
1995	Your Little Secret: Released: November 14, 1995; Label: Island; Formats: CD, cassette	6	17	30	33	26	10	22	—	23	85	RIAA: 2× Platinum; ARIA: Gold; CRIA: Platinum
1999	Breakdown: Released: October 5, 1999; Label: Island; Formats: LP, CD	12	15	45	—	14	20	—	—	38	—	RIAA: Gold
2001	Skin: Released: July 10, 2001; Label: Island; Formats: CD, LP, cassette	9	30	35	—	10	30	—	—	65	—	
2004	Lucky: Released: February 10, 2004; Label: Island; Format: LP, CD, digital download	15	91	40	—	18	29	—	—	51	—	
2007	The Awakening: Released: September 25, 2007; Label: Island; Format: LP, CD, digital download	13	—	57	—	18	28	—	—	87	—	
2008	A New Thought for Christmas: Released: September 30, 2008; Label: Island; Format: LP, CD	113	—	—	—	—	—	—	—	—	—	
2010	Fearless Love: Released: April 27, 2010; Label: Island; Format: LP, CD	7	—	26	—	10	28	—	—	51	—	
2012	4th Street Feeling: Released: September 4, 2012; Label: Island; Formats: LP, CD	18	78	50	—	25	31	—	—	—	—	
2014	This Is M.E.: Released: September 30, 2014; Label: ME; Formats: LP, CD	21	34	61	—	41	—	—	—	96	—	
2016	MEmphis Rock and Soul: Released: October 7, 2016; Label: Stax; Formats: LP, CD	34	40	50	121	52	82	—	—	63	—	
2019	The Medicine Show: Released: April 12, 2019; Label: Concord, MLE; Formats: LP, CD	95	— (Note: The Medicine Show did not enter the ARIA Albums Chart but peaked at number 21 on the ARIA Digital Album Chart.)	74	168	29	85	—	—	44	—	
2021	One Way Out: Released: September 17, 2021; Label: BMG; Formats: CD, LP, digital download	— (Note: One Way Out did not enter the US Billboard 200, but did peak at number 73 on the Top Album Sales chart.)	—	—	—	30	—	—	—	31	—	
2026	Rise: Released: March 27, 2026; Label: Sun; Formats: CD, LP, digital download	192	—	—	—	—	—	—	—	—	—	
"—" denotes releases that did not chart or were not released.

=== Compilation albums ===
List of compilation albums, with selected peak chart positions and certifications
Year	Title	Chart positions					Certifications
Year	Title	US	AUS	GER	NLD	NZ	Certifications
2005	Greatest Hits: The Road Less Traveled: Released: October 18, 2005; Label: Island; Formats: CD, digital download	14	94	61	73	—	RIAA: Gold
2011	Icon: Released: March 1, 2011; Label: Universal; Formats: CD, digital download	—	—	—	—	16	

=== Live albums ===
List of live albums, with selected details
Year	Title
1989	Live at the Bottom Line: Released: 1989; Label: Air Cuts; Formats: CD/2 CD
2002	Live and Alone: Released: 2002; Label: Island; Formats: DVD/2 DVD
2004	Lucky Live: Released: October 2004; Label: Island; Formats: CD (+ DVD)
2008	Awakening Live: Released: March 29, 2008; Label: Island; Formats: CD (+ DVD)
2015	A Little Bit of Me: Live in L.A.: Released June 9, 2015; Label: Rock Fuel Media; Formats: Digital download, CD, DVD, Blu-ray
2023	Beautiful Day (Live Foxboro 93): Released October 13, 2023; Label: Atlas; Formats: Digital download
2024	I'm Not Broken (Live From Topeka Correctional Facility): Released July 9, 2024; Label: Sun; Formats: Digital download, CD, Vinyl

== Extended plays ==
- Melissa Etheridge Live (1988)
- 5 Live Cuts (1988)
- Live (1990)

== Singles ==
List of singles, with selected peak chart positions
Year	Title	Chart positions										Album
Year	Title	US Hot 100	US Main Rock	US AC	US Adult	AUS	CAN	GER	NLD	NZ	UK	Album
1988	"Bring Me Some Water"	—	10	—	—	9	34	—	—	17	100	Melissa Etheridge
1988	"Don't You Need" (UK only)	—	—	—	—	—	—	—	—	—	—	Melissa Etheridge
1988	"Like the Way I Do"	42 (Note: "Like the Way I Do" did not chart on the U.S. Billboard Hot 100 on its initial release. Seven years later it was re-released as the B-side to "If I Wanted To", allowing the track to chart on the Hot 100 for the first time.)	28	—	—	16	—	—	16	17	—	Melissa Etheridge
1988	"Similar Features"	94	6	—	—	34	93	—	—	—	—	Melissa Etheridge
1989	"Chrome Plated Heart" (US only)	—	22	—	—	—	—	—	—	—	—	Melissa Etheridge
1989	"No Souvenirs"	95	9	—	—	30	4	—	71	—	—	Brave and Crazy
1989	"The Angels"	—	34	—	—	116	—	—	—	—	—	Brave and Crazy
1989	"Let Me Go"	—	13	—	—	70	27	—	—	—	—	Brave and Crazy
1990	"You Can Sleep While I Drive"	—	—	—	—	105	—	—	56	—	—	Brave and Crazy
1992	"Ain't It Heavy"	—	10	—	—	44	9	—	—	—	—	Never Enough
1992	"2001"	—	—	—	—	71	21	—	—	—	—	Never Enough
1992	"Dance Without Sleeping"	—	—	24	—	145	46	—	—	—	—	Never Enough
1992	"Like the Way I Do" (live)	—	—	—	—	—	—	—	2	—	—	Melissa Etheridge Live (EP)
1993	"Must Be Crazy for Me"	—	—	—	—	—	—	—	30	—	—	Never Enough
1993	"I'm the Only One"	8	10	1	9	58	12	—	26	—	—	Yes I Am
1993	"Come to My Window"	25	22	4	27	—	13	—	—	—	—	Yes I Am
1994	"All American Girl"	—	24	—	—	—	24	—	—	—	—	Yes I Am
1994	"I Will Never Be the Same"	—	—	—	—	—	—	—	—	—	—	Yes I Am
1994	"Happy Xmas (War Is Over)"/ "Give Peace a Chance"	—	—	—	—	—	—	—	—	—	—	single only
1994	"If I Wanted To"	16	—	17	—	47	19	—	—	—	—	Yes I Am
1995	"Your Little Secret"	—	4	—	40	40	6	99	25	—	—	Your Little Secret
1996	"I Want to Come Over"	22	22	17	9	29	1	83	—	29	100	Your Little Secret
1996	"Nowhere to Go"	40	—	24	9	—	4	—	—	—	—	Your Little Secret
1999	"Angels Would Fall"	51	—	—	9	59	6	88	61	48	—	Breakdown
1999	"Scarecrow"	—	—	—	—	—	—	—	—	—	—	Breakdown
2000	"Enough of Me"	—	—	—	19	—	—	—	—	—	—	Breakdown
2000	"Stronger Than Me"	—	—	—	—	—	—	—	—	—	—	Breakdown
2001	"I Want to Be in Love"	—	—	—	20	79	—	—	80	—	—	Skin
2004	"Breathe"	— (Note: "Breathe" did not enter the U.S. Billboard Hot 100 but peaked at number six on the Bubbling Under Hot 100.)	—	22	9	—	—	—	96	—	—	Lucky
2004	"This Moment"	—	—	—	34	—	—	—	—	—	—	Lucky
2005	"Cry Baby"/ "Piece of My Heart" (with Joss Stone)	32	—	—	—	—	—	—	—	—	—	Download-only single
2005	"Refugee"	—	—	—	—	—	—	—	—	—	—	Greatest Hits: The Road Less Traveled
2005	"I Run for Life"	— (Note: "I Run for Life" did not enter the U.S. Billboard Hot 100 but peaked at number nine on the Bubbling Under Hot 100.)	—	10	—	—	—	—	—	—	—	Greatest Hits: The Road Less Traveled
2006	"I Need to Wake Up"	—	—	—	—	—	—	—	—	—	—	Greatest Hits: The Road Less Traveled (enhanced version)
2007	"Message to Myself"	—	—	25	—	—	—	52	—	—	—	The Awakening
2008	"Just Stand Up!" (with 14 other artists)	11	—	17	35	39	10	—	—	19	26	Download-only single
2010	"Fearless Love"	—	—	18	24	—	—	—	—	—	—	Fearless Love
2010	"The Wanting of You"	—	—	—	—	—	—	—	—	—	—	Fearless Love
2012	"Falling Up"	—	—	—	—	—	—	—	—	—	—	4th Street Feeling
2014	"Uprising of Love"	—	—	—	—	—	—	—	—	—	—	Download-only single
2014	"Take My Number"	—	—	—	—	—	—	—	—	—	—	This Is M.E.
2015	"Monster"	—	—	—	—	—	—	—	—	—	—	This Is M.E.
2016	"Pulse"	—	—	—	—	—	—	—	—	—	—	Download-only single
2016	"Respect Yourself"	—	—	—	—	—	—	—	—	—	—	MEmphis Rock and Soul
2019	"Faded by Design"	—	—	—	—	—	—	—	—	—	—	The Medicine Show
2026	"Bein' Alive"	—	—	—	—	—	—	—	—	—	—	Rise
"—" denotes releases that did not chart or were not released.

== Soundtrack contributions ==
Year	Song	Film
1990	"Don't Look at Me"	Welcome Home, Roxy Carmichael
1990	"In Roxy's Eyes (I Will Never Be the Same)"	Welcome Home, Roxy Carmichael
1995	"I Take You with Me"	Boys on the Side
1997	"This War Is Over"	The Devil's Own
2006	"Welcome to This Day"	Brother Bear 2
2006	"Feels Like Home" (with Josh Kelley)	Brother Bear 2
2006	"It Will Be Me"	Brother Bear 2
2006	"Welcome to This Day (Reprise)" (with Josh Kelley)	Brother Bear 2

== Miscellaneous ==
These songs have not appeared on a studio album released by Etheridge.

Year	Song	Album
1992	"The Green Grass Grew All Around"	For Our Children – The Concert
1994	"Burning Love"	It's Now or Never: The Tribute to Elvis
1994	"Bring Me Some Water" (live version)	Grammy's Greatest Moments Volume IV
1995	"The Weakness in Me"	Ain't Nuthin' but a She Thing
1996	"Be My Baby"	The Concert for the Rock and Roll Hall of Fame
1996	"Love Child"	The Concert for the Rock and Roll Hall of Fame
1996	"Leader of the Pack"	The Concert for the Rock and Roll Hall of Fame
1997	"Sin tener a donde ir"	Red Hot + Latin: Silencio = Muerte
1998	"Apartment #9"	Tammy Wynette Remembered
2001	"The Angels" (Earl Scruggs with Melissa Etheridge)	Earl Scruggs and Friends
2001	"Born to Run"	The Concert for New York City
2023	"Tried to Rock and Roll Me" (Dolly Parton featuring Melissa Etheridge)	Rockstar

== DVDs ==
Year	Title	Certifications
2001	Live... and Alone (DVD/2DVD)	RIAA: 2× Platinum
2004	Lucky Live (DVD/DVD+CD)	
2005	The Road Less Travelled (CD+DVD)	
2007	The Awakening Live (DVD+CD)	

== Music videos ==
Year	Song	Director(s)
1988	"Bring Me Some Water"	Tony van den Ende; Julie Cypher
1988	"Similar Features"	Meiert Avis
1988	"Like the Way I Do"	Tony van den Ende
1989	"No Souvenirs"	
1989	"The Angels"	Julie Cypher
1990	"Let Me Go"	Julie Cypher
1990	"You Can Sleep While I Drive"	Julie Cypher
1992	"Ain't It Heavy"	
1992	"2001"	Julie Cypher
1992	"Dance Without Sleeping"	
1993	"I'm the Only One"	David Hogan
1993	"Come to My Window"	Samuel Bayer
1994	"All American Girl"	Tim Royes
1994	"If I Wanted To"	Samuel Bayer
1994	"Happy Xmas (War Is Over)"	Matt Mahurin
1995	"I'm the Only One" (live)	
1995	"Your Little Secret"	David Hogan
1995	"The Weakness in Me"	Maria Maggenti
1996	"I Want to Come Over"	Pam Thomas
1996	"Nowhere to Go"	Julie Cypher
1999	"Angels Would Fall"	Melissa Etheridge
2000	"Enough of Me"	Julie Cypher
2001	"I Want to Be in Love"	David Hogan
2004	"Breathe"	Philip Andelman
2005	"Refugee"	James Frost
2006	"I Run for Life"	Randee St. Nicholas
2006	"I Need to Wake Up"	Fredrik Bond
2007	"Message to Myself"	Danny Clinch
2007	"California" (only available on The Awakening Live DVD)	
2007	"Heroes and Friends" (only available on The Awakening Live DVD)	
2007	"Threesome" (only available on The Awakening Live DVD)	
2007	"Map of the Stars" (only available on The Awakening Live DVD)	
2010	"Fearless Love"	Jay Martin
2010	"Nervous"	
2012	"Falling Up"	Linda Wallem
2014	"Uprising of Love"	
2014	"Take My Number"	Dale Resteghini
2015	"Monster"	Dale Resteghini; Niv Gat

== See also ==
- List of awards and nominations received by Melissa Etheridge
