= List of awards and nominations received by Melissa Etheridge =

Melissa Etheridge awards and nominations
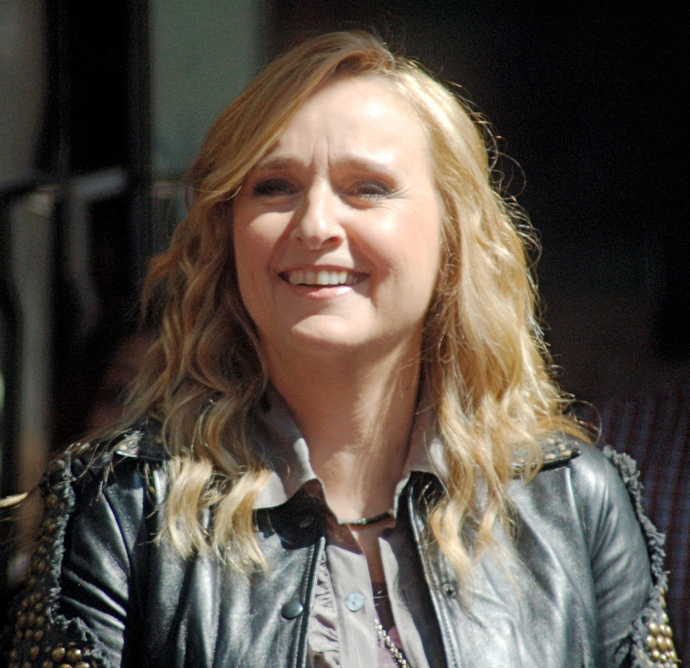
- Etheridge in 2011 receiving a star on the Hollywood Walk of Fame
Awards and nominations
Award	Wins	Nominations
American Music Awards	0	1
Billboard	0	2
Grammy	2	15
Juno	1	1
Academy Awards	1	1
Broadcast Film Critics Association Awards	0	1

The following is a list of awards, honors, and nominations received by American singer, songwriter, musician, and guitarist Melissa Etheridge.

She has received various accolades and honors throughout her career. Among her competitive awards, Etheridge has won two Grammy Awards (from 15 nominations) and an Academy Award. Among her honorary accolades, she has received the ASCAP Founders Award, an Honorary Doctor of Music Degree from Berklee College of Music, and a star on the Hollywood Walk of Fame.

== Major industry awards ==
=== Academy Awards ===
The Academy Awards are presented annually by the Academy of Motion Picture Arts and Sciences (AMPAS) for excellence of cinematic achievements. Etheridge has received one award from one nomination.

Year	Category	Nominated work	Result	Ref.
2007	Best Original Song	"I Need to Wake Up" (from An Inconvenient Truth)	Won	

=== Critics Choice Movie Awards ===
The Critics' Choice Movie Awards are presented annually by the American-Canadian Critics Choice Association (CCA) to honor the finest in cinematic achievement.

Year	Category	Nominated work	Result	Ref.
2007	Best Song	"I Need to Wake Up" (from An Inconvenient Truth)	Nominated	

=== Grammy Awards ===
The Grammy Awards are awarded annually by the National Academy of Recording Arts and Sciences. Often considered the highest music honor, the awards were established in 1958. Etheridge has won two awards from 15 nominations.

Year	Category	Nominated work	Result	Ref.
1989	Best Rock Vocal Performance, Female	"Bring Me Some Water"	Nominated	
1990	Best Rock Vocal Performance, Female	"Brave and Crazy"	Nominated	
1991	Best Rock Vocal Performance, Female	"The Angels"	Nominated	
1993	Best Rock Vocal Performance, Female	"Ain't It Heavy"	Won	
1995	Best Rock Vocal Performance, Female	"Come to My Window"	Won	
1995	Best Rock Song	"Come to My Window"	Nominated	
1995	Best Rock Song	"I'm the Only One"	Nominated	
2000	Best Rock Song	"Angels Would Fall"	Nominated	
2000	Best Rock Vocal Performance, Female	"Angels Would Fall"	Nominated	
2000	Best Rock Album	Breakdown	Nominated	
2001	Best Rock Vocal Performance, Female	"Enough of Me"	Nominated	
2002	Best Rock Vocal Performance, Female	"I Want to Be in Love"	Nominated	
2003	Best Rock Vocal Performance, Female	"The Weakness in Me"	Nominated	
2005	Best Rock Vocal Performance, Solo	"Breathe"	Nominated	
2007	Best Song Written for a Motion Picture, Television or Other Visual Media	"I Need to Wake Up"	Nominated	

== Other industry awards ==
=== A2IM Libera Awards ===
Year	Category	Nominated work	Result	Ref.
2020	Best Mainstream Rock Album	The Medicine Show	Nominated	

=== American Music Awards ===
The American Music Awards were created by Dick Clark in 1973 to honor popular musicians from various genres of music and to "put audiences in touch with the latest phenomena in American music".

Year	Category	Nominated work	Result	Ref.
1996	Favorite Pop/Rock Female Artist	Herself	Nominated	

=== ASCAP Pop Music Awards ===
Year	Category	Nominated work	Result	Ref.
1996	Pop Songwriter of the Year	Herself	Won	
1996	Most Performed Songs	"Come to My Window"	Won	
1996	Most Performed Songs	"I'm the Only One"	Won	
1996	Most Performed Songs	"If I Wanted To"	Won	
1997	Most Performed Songs	"I Want to Come Over"	Won	
2007	Herself	ASCAP Founders Award	Honoree	

=== Billboard Music Awards ===
The Billboard Music Awards are held to honour artists for commercial performance in the U.S., based on record charts published by Billboard.

Year	Category	Nominated work	Result	Ref.
1995	Top Female Artist	Herself	Nominated	
1995	Top Billboard 200 Artist – Female	Herself	Nominated	

=== ECHO Awards ===
The ECHO Award is a German music award granted every year by the Deutsche Phono-Akademie, an association of recording companies.

Year	Category	Nominated work	Result	Ref.
1993	Best International Female	Herself	Nominated	

=== GLAAD Media Awards ===
The GLAAD Media Awards were created in 1990 by the Gay & Lesbian Alliance Against Defamation (GLAAD) to recognize and honor the mainstream media for their fair, accurate and inclusive representations of the LGBTQ community.

Year	Category	Nominated work	Result	Ref.
1994	Outstanding Music Artist	Yes I Am	Won	
1995	Outstanding Music Video	"I'm the Only One"	Won	
1999	Stephen F. Kolzak Award	Herself	Won	
2000	Outstanding Music Artist	Breakdown	Nominated	
2002	Outstanding Music Artist	Skin	Nominated	
2005	Outstanding Music Artist	Lucky	Nominated	
2006	Outstanding Music Artist	Greatest Hits: The Road Less Traveled	Won	
2006	Stephen F. Kolzak Award	Herself	Won	
2008	Outstanding Music Artist	The Awakening	Nominated	
2020	Outstanding Music Artist	The Medicine Show	Nominated	
2022	Outstanding Music Artist	One Way Out	Nominated	

=== Gold Derby Awards ===
Year	Category	Nominated work	Result	Ref.
2007	Original Song	"I Need to Wake Up" (from An Inconvenient Truth)	Nominated	

=== Hollywood Walk of Fame ===
The Hollywood Walk of Fame is a sidewalk along Hollywood Boulevard and Vine Street in Hollywood, California, with more than 2,000 five-pointed stars to honor artists for their achievement in the entertainment industry. Etheridge received a star in September 2011. It is the 2,450th star that has been awarded.

Year	Honoree	Award	Result	Ref.
2011	Melissa Etheridge	Hollywood Walk of Fame	Honoree	

=== Juno Awards ===
The Juno Awards are awards presented by the Canadian Academy of Recording Arts and Sciences to recognize outstanding achievements in Canada's music industry.

Year	Category	Nominated work	Result	Ref.
1990	International Entertainer of the Year	Herself	Won	

=== Pollstar Concert Industry Awards ===
The Pollstar Concert Industry Awards is an annual award ceremony to honor artists and professionals in the concert industry.

Year	Category	Nominated work	Result	Ref.
1990	Best Debut Tour	Tour	Nominated	
1990	Club Tour of the Year	Tour	Nominated	
1990	Small Hall Tour of the Year	Tour	Nominated	
1995	Small Hall Tour of the Year	Tour	Won	

=== Rock and Roll Hall of Fame ===
The Rock and Roll Hall of Fame, established on April 20, 1983, by Ahmet Ertegun, is museum and hall of fame located in Cleveland, Ohio. The museum documents the history of rock music and the artists, producers, engineers, and other notable figures who have influenced its development. On February 25, 2026, Etheridge was announced as one of the 17 artists in the performer category nominated for the Rock & Roll Hall of Fame Class of 2026.

Year	Honoree	Nominated work	Result	Ref.
2026	Melissa Etheridge	Rock and Roll Hall of Fame	Nominated	

== Other accolades ==
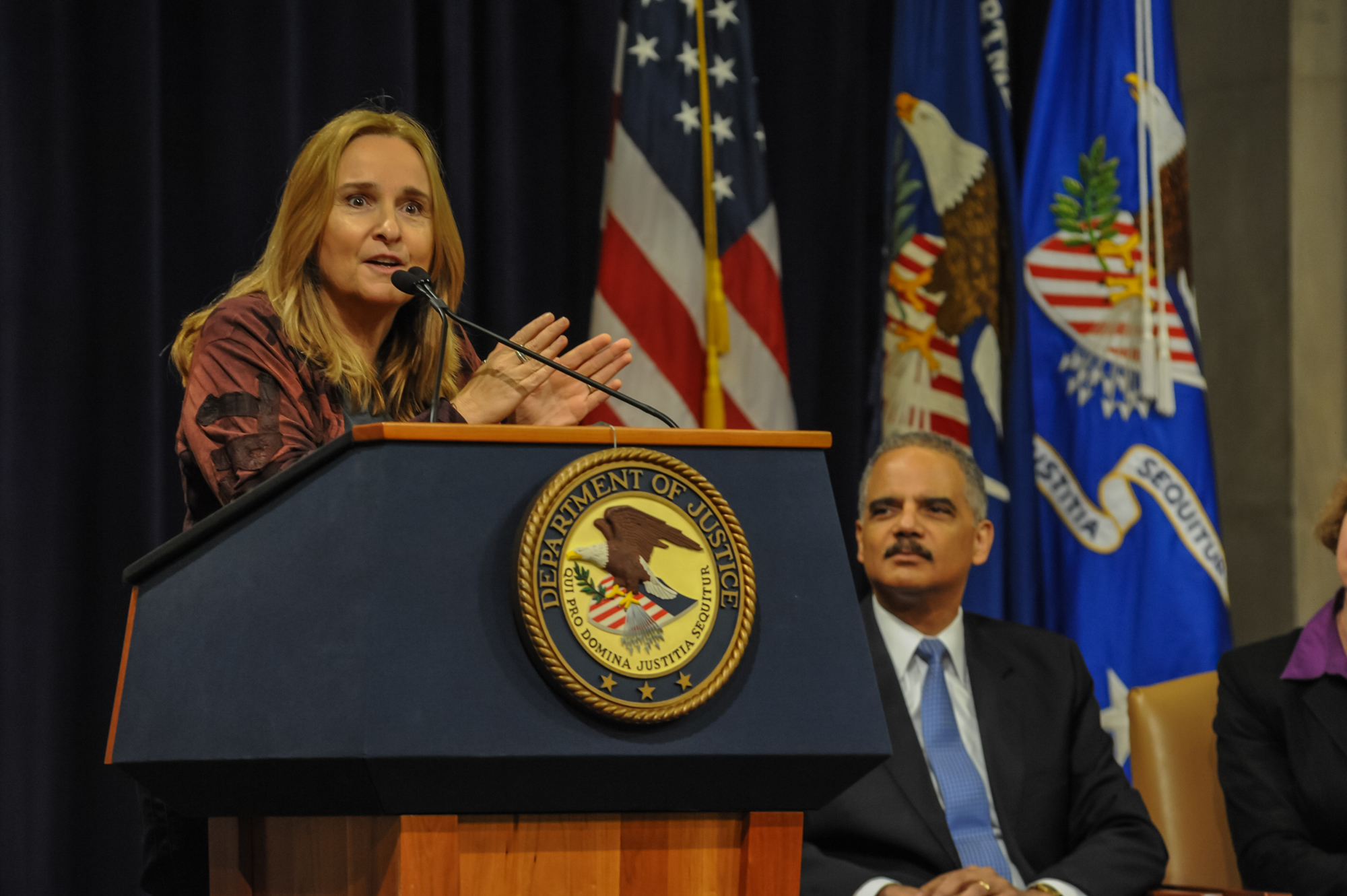
Etheridge shared her personal experiences of advocating for the LGBT community at a United States Department of Justice Event

- 1988 – Etheridge received the "Diamond Spotlight Award" at the Diamond Awards Show, Belgium.
- 1999 – Ranked No. 49 on VH1's 100 Greatest Women in Rock & Roll.
- 2001 – Etheridge won the Gibson Guitar Award for Best Rock Guitarist: Female.
- 2006 – Etheridge received GLAAD's Stephen F. Kolzak Award, which honors openly lesbian, gay, bisexual or transgender media professionals who have made a significant difference in promoting equal rights, at the 17th GLAAD Media Awards. In addition, she was awarded as Outstanding Music Artist for Greatest Hits: The Road Less Traveled.
- 2006 – Berklee College of Music's presented Etheridge with an Honorary Doctor of Music Degree. Etheridge delivered the commencement address in front of more than 800 graduating students and 4,000 guests.
- 2007 – Rolling Stone ranked The Awakening at No. 20 on their list of the Top 50 Albums of 2007.

== See also ==
- Melissa Etheridge discography
