= David Cole (audio engineer) =

American record producer/engineer/mixer

- Genres: Rock and roll, country, popular music
- Occupation: Producer, Engineer, Mixer
- Years active: 1976–present

David Cole is a record producer, who has worked with Bob Seger & the Silver Bullet Band, Melissa Etheridge, Richard Marx, Steve Miller Band, Emerson Drive, NSYNC, and many others.

== Early career ==
In 1976, David Cole began working as a Staff Engineer at the Capitol Tower, where he worked with a variety of talent, including Bob Seger & the Silver Bullet Band, Maze, Steve Miller Band, as well as Richard Marx, and Tina Turner. He then was elevated to Staff Producer after his friend and mentor, Carter, left for another label. During that time, Cole engineered and co-produced the debut album for Richard Marx.

Cole then moved on to MCA Records for 2 years, having a hit with the group “Boys Club”, produced the debut album for Tim Feehan, and a solo record for Eagle, Timothy B. Schmit, before moving on to freelance work.

He has since continued to work with many artists including N’SYNC, Etheridge, and Seger, with whom he worked with for 11 years to finish his solo album, Face the Promise. He also spent 6 years as a Full-Time Instructor at The Art Institute of California – San Diego, teaching audio production.

== Selected discography ==
=== With Bob Seger ===
- Stranger in Town
- Against the Wind
- Like a Rock
- The Fire Inside
- It's a Mystery
- Face the Promise
- Ride Out
- I Knew You When

=== With Melissa Etheridge ===
- Skin
- Lucky
- The Awakening
- A New Thought for Christmas

=== With the Steve Miller Band ===
- Abracadabra
- Italian X Rays
- Living in the 20th Century

=== With Richard Marx ===
- Richard Marx
- Repeat Offender
- Days in Avalon
- My Own Best Enemy
