= Teresa's Tattoo =

1994 American film by Julie Cypher

- Directed by: Julie Cypher
- Written by: Georgie Huntington
- Story by: Samuel Benedict
- Produced by: Samuel Benedict; Lisa M. Hansen; Philip McKeon; Marc Rocco
- Starring: C. Thomas Howell; Adrienne Shelly; Nancy McKeon; Lou Diamond Phillips
- Cinematography: Sven Kirsten
- Edited by: Christopher Rouse
- Music by: Andrew Keresztes
- Production companies: CineTel Films; Trimark Pictures; Yankee Entertainment Group
- Distributed by: Trimark Pictures
- Release date: March 15, 1994
- Running time: 88 minutes
- Country: United States
- Language: English

Teresa's Tattoo is a 1994 American action comedy-crime film directed by Julie Cypher. The film stars C. Thomas Howell, Nancy McKeon, Lou Diamond Phillips, Melissa Etheridge, who also performed songs for the film, Casey Siemaszko, Adrienne Shelly and Majel Barrett. It was filmed in Los Angeles, California.

Teresa's Tattoo was produced by CineTel Films, Trimark Pictures and Yankee Entertainment Group Inc. It was distributed by Trimark Pictures.

== Plot ==
Gloria is being held hostage and bothering her captors in charge of watching her, Mooney and Titus, by changing the channel the two were watching on television and jumping in front of the TV. Titus then scolds and takes the remote from Gloria and suggests she should go take a swim in the pool outside which she subsequently obliges. While playing in the pool, Gloria hauls a trampoline near the edge of the pool and begins to jump on it before slipping and falling in the pool.

Meanwhile, Teresa Brigger, a mathematician grad student who bears an uncanny resemblance to Gloria, is talking to her friend Bruno, about her plans for the upcoming spring break. She plans on not celebrating the coming holiday and wants to continue studying math. At the pool, Carl, Titus and Mooney's boss, shows up to find Gloria, who is supposed to be exchanged in a ransom deal with her half-witted brother, Michael and his associate, Wheeler for the earrings she is wearing that are secretly holograph plans to a confidential NASA space program, dead after drowning in the pool. The trio then decides to search for a girl that looks like the deceased Gloria so they can complete the deal. Teresa and Bruno then go to a gathering where she encounters Bruno's friend and her ex-boyfriend, Rick.

== Cast ==
- C. Thomas Howell as Carl Hamilton Jr.
- Nancy McKeon as Sara Pond
- Lou Diamond Phillips as Wheeler
- Casey Siemaszko as Michael
- Brian Davila as Elvis
- Jonathan Silverman as Rick
- Joe Pantoliano as Bruno
- Melissa Etheridge as The Hooker
- Adrienne Shelly as Teresa Brigger / Gloria
- Majel Barrett as Henrietta
- Anthony Clark as Mooney
- Tippi Hedren as Evelyn Hill
- Matt Adler as Titus
- k.d. lang as Michelle
- Sean Astin as Frank (uncredited)
- Kiefer Sutherland as Officer (uncredited)
- Nanette Fabray as Martha Mae

== Home media ==
The film was released on VHS in the U.S. by Lionsgate Home Entertainment.

== Soundtrack ==
- "2001" – Written and Performed by Melissa Etheridge
- "I Really Must Be Going" – Written and Performed by Melissa Etheridge
- "All American Girl" – Written and Performed by Melissa Etheridge
- "Do It For The Rush" – Written and Performed by Melissa Etheridge
- "Save Myself" – Written by Melissa Etheridge; Performed by Mare Winningham
- "No Strings Attached" – Written by Simone Lazer and Audrey Koz; Performed by Betty Ball
- "When You're Near" – Written and Performed by David Adjian
- "Pool Cue Music" – Written and Performed by Richard Friedman
- "All Night Long" – Written by Mark Gast; Performed by Raging Storm
- "Betrayal of Kings" – Written by Mark Gast; Performed by Salem's Wych
- "Lover Lay Down" – Written and Performed by K.O.
- "Alah" – Written and Performed by Andrew Kereazies
- "I Feel You" – Written and Performed by Andrew Kereazies
- "Silver Bullet" – Written by Leigh Lawson & Jack Marsh; Performed by Leigh Lawson
- "Coming Down On Me" – Written by Leigh Lawson & Pete Sadony; Performed by Leigh Lawson

== Sources ==
- Luck, Joyce (1997). Melissa Etheridge: Our Little Secret. Toronto: ECW Press. p. 141. ISBN 978-1550222982.
