= Julie Cypher =

American film director

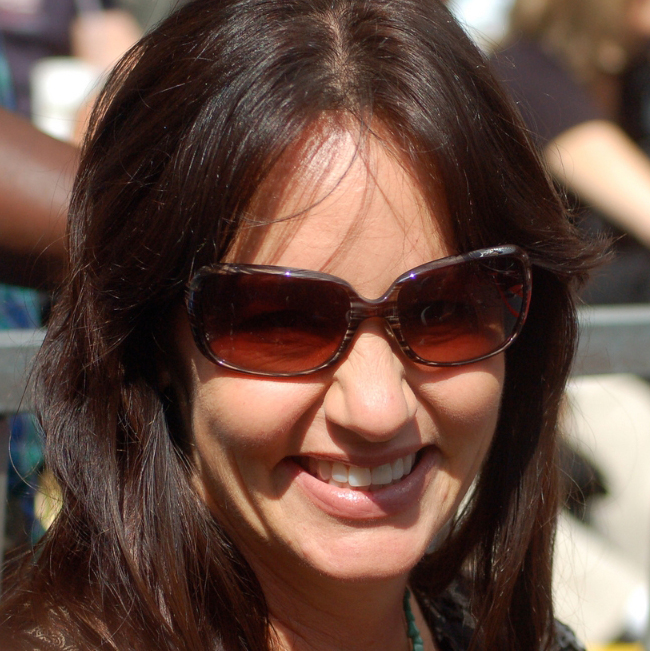
- Cypher in 2011
- Born: August 24, 1964 (age 61); Wichita, Kansas, U.S.
- Occupation: Film director
- Spouses: Lou Diamond Phillips (m. 1987; div. 1990) Matthew Hale (m. 2004)
- Partner(s): Melissa Etheridge (c. 1990; sep. 2000)
- Children: 2

Julie Cypher (born August 24, 1964) is an American film director and gay rights advocate. She is best known as the former partner of musician Melissa Etheridge, with whom she had two children. They were one of the first celebrity same-sex couples. This relationship had followed Cypher's three-year marriage to actor Lou Diamond Phillips. In 2004 she married again, to another man.

== Biography ==
Cypher was born in Wichita, Kansas, to Dick and Betty (née Jackson) Cypher. She has an older sister named Melanie. She attended the University of Texas at Austin, studying television and film.

She married actor Lou Diamond Phillips on September 17, 1987. Two years later, she met Melissa Etheridge while assisting on the music video for the single "Bring Me Some Water". She separated from Phillips in 1990, came out as a lesbian, and started a relationship with Etheridge. Cypher directed the 1995 film Teresa's Tattoo, starring Phillips, C. Thomas Howell, and Kiefer Sutherland.

== Personal life ==
After marrying and being with actor Lou Diamond Phillips for three years, Cypher separated and came out as a lesbian.

She was a gay rights advocate, and became notable as a partner in one of the first publicly lesbian celebrity couples. In 1995, she and Melissa Etheridge appeared in a "We'd Rather Go Naked Than Wear Fur" poster campaign for PETA.

During her partnership with Etheridge, Cypher gave birth to two children via artificial insemination: a daughter, Bailey Jean, born in February 1997; and a son, Beckett, born November 1998. Although initially reluctant to discuss it, the couple eventually revealed that the biological father of both children was musician David Crosby. In a 1999 therapy session, Cypher told Etheridge that she (Cypher) was "not gay". The couple split in September 2000.

Cypher later married again, to Matthew Hale in 2004.

On May 13, 2020, Etheridge announced via Twitter that Beckett, her son with Cypher, had died at age 21.
