= MEmphis Rock and Soul =

Studio album by Melissa Etheridge
- Released: October 7, 2016
- Studio: Royal Studios, Memphis, Tennessee, United States; The Village Studios, Los Angeles, California, United States
- Genre: Rock, soul
- Length: 47:39
- Language: English
- Label: Stax
- Producer: Melissa Etheridge

Melissa Etheridge chronology
This Is M.E. (2014)	MEmphis Rock and Soul (2016)	The Medicine Show (2019)

MEmphis Rock and Soul is the fourteenth studio album by American singer-songwriter Melissa Etheridge, released by Stax Records on October 7, 2016. A collection of soul covers, the album received a positive critical reception.

== Recording and release ==
Etheridge wanted to record an album of songs in Memphis and from the Stax Records catalog that inspired her as a child growing up in Kansas, specifically in historic Memphis studios with recordings that included her own sound while being faithful to the original versions. Etheridge additionally recruited some of the original artists who recorded the initial songs and even used Al Green's microphone to record her vocals. The album was preceded by a music video for her cover of Sam and Dave's "Hold On, I’m Coming".

The spelling of the title with "MEmphis" represents Etheridge's initials.

== Reception ==
Editors at AllMusic rated this album three out of five stars, with reviewer Stephen Thomas Erlewine characterizing the covers as "faithful and loving to the original versions, preserving the arrangements but sometimes allowing the band to vamp a bit", noting that "her affection for both the songs and sound of Southern soul in the '60s is evident". Lee Zimmerman of Glide scored this album a nine out of 10, writing "there's no pomp or pretension needed; Etheridge revels in her own edge and authority, thereby making these songs an ideal match for a style that's always been borne by a certain soulful edge to begin with". Hal Horowitz of American Songwriter rated MEmphis Rock and Soul four out of five stars and also noted the natural fit between this genre and Etheridge's style, noting that the music "leaves you with an appreciation that Etheridge loves and cares about the music and is determined to do it justice". PopMatters' Colin McGuire gave the album a five out of 10, calling out several tracks as weaker than the originals and assessing that her vocals don't "match the amount or the type that it takes to successfully embody these songs" leaving the album "a soul record that lacks soul".

== Track listing ==
1. "Memphis Train" (Mack Rice, Willie Sparks, and Rufus Thomas) – 3:50
2. "Respect Yourself (People Stand Up)" (Melissa Etheridge, Luther Ingram, Priscilla Renae, and Mack Rice) – 4:25
3. "Who's Making Love" (Homer Banks, Bettye Crutcher, Don Davis, and Raymond Jackson) – 3:51
4. "Hold On, I’m Coming" (Isaac Hayes and David Porter) – 3:23
5. "I've Been Loving You Too Long (to Stop Now)" (Jerry Butler and Otis Redding) – 4:05
6. "Any Other Way" (William Bell) – 3:24
7. "I'm a Lover" (John Burk, Lowell Fulson, Melissa Etheridge, and Jimmy McCracklin) – 3:06
8. "Rock Me Baby" (Joe Josea and B. B. King) – 4:47
9. "I Forgot to Be Your Lover" (William Bell and Booker T. Jones) – 4:52
10. "Wait a Minute" (Barbara Stephens) – 2:55
11. "Born Under a Bad Sign" (Jones) – 4:36
12. "I've Got Dreams to Remember" (Otis Redding and Zelma Redding) – 4:34

Deluxe edition bonus tracks

13. "Your Good Thing (Is About to End)" (Isaac Hayes and David Porter) – 4:33
14. "I Know a Place (I'll Take You There)" (Al Bell) – 3:03
15. "These Arms of Mine" (Otis Redding) – 3:49

== Personnel ==
- Melissa Etheridge – guitar, vocals, production
- Paul Blakemore – mastering
- Stefanie Bolton – backing vocals
- John Burk – production, executive production
- Yennifer Correia – violin
- Michael Fahey – mixing assistance
- Theron Feemster – programming
- Marc Franklin – trumpet
- Charles Hodges – organ
- Leroy Hodges – bass guitar
- Jonathan Kirkscey – cello
- Beth Luscombe – viola
- John Mayer – lead guitar on "Rock Me Baby" and "Born Under a Bad Sign"
- Lannie McMillan – saxophone
- Lawrence "Boo" Mitchell – recording at Royal Studios
- Jessie Munson – violin
- Sharisse Norman – backing vocals
- Seth Presant – recording at The Village Studios
- Vance Powell – mixing at Sputnik Sound
- Candice Rayburn-Marshall – backing vocals
- James Robertson – drums
- Myriam Santos – photography
- Carrie Smith – art direction, design
- Kirk Smothers – baritone saxophone
- Lester Snell – horn arrangement on "I've Been Loving You Too Long (to Stop Now)", string arrangement on "I've Been Loving You Too Long (to Stop Now)" and "I Forgot to Be Your Lover"
- Jim Spake – tenor saxophone
- Michael Toles – guitar
- Archie Turner – keyboards

== Charts ==
Chart performance for MEmphis Rock and Soul
Chart (2016)	Peak position
Australian Albums (ARIA)	40
Austrian Albums (Ö3 Austria)	50
Belgian Albums (Ultratop Flanders)	121
Canadian Albums (Billboard)	79
Dutch Albums (Album Top 100)	82
German Albums (Offizielle Top 100)	52
Swiss Albums (Schweizer Hitparade)	63
US Billboard 200	34
US Top Rock Albums (Billboard)	9
UK Americana Albums (OCC)	16
Billboard Blues Albums	1

== See also ==
- List of 2016 albums
