= Rise (Melissa Etheridge album) =

Studio album by Melissa Etheridge
- Released: March 27, 2026
- Studio: Sunset Studio 3 (Los Angeles)
- Genre: Country rock; Americana
- Length: 44:06
- Label: MLE; Sun
- Producer: Melissa Etheridge; Shooter Jennings

Melissa Etheridge chronology
One Way Out (2021)	Rise (2026)

Singles from Rise
- 1. "Don't You Want a Woman" Released: October 10, 2025; 2. "Matches" Released: December 12, 2025; 3. "Bein' Alive" Released: February 25, 2026

Rise is the seventeenth studio album by the American singer-songwriter Melissa Etheridge. It was released on March 27, 2026, under Etheridge's own label MLE Music with distribution by Sun Label Group.

== Background ==
Rise is Etheridge's first body of work consisting of all new material since her fifteenth studio album The Medicine Show (2019), and her first studio album overall since One Way Out (2021); it was co-produced by Etheridge and Shooter Jennings and recorded at Sunset Studios in Los Angeles.

Etheridge described the project as a fusion between rock and country music, explaining that this was the primary reason she selected Jennings as the album's producer. Etheridge stated, "I was looking for a producer who could walk the line between rock and country. I looked at his work and thought, “Oh, yeah.” [I’m a] big fan of [his father] Waylon Jennings. I like that he’s an L.A. guy who’s got this heavy-metal rock background, but is also very rooted in that country-rock sound. We met, talked, and, boy, did we get on. I knew — this is the guy." Of the collaboration with Chris Stapleton, Etheridge expressed that he was the only person she was interested in writing with for the album and asked her manager to reach out despite having never met him. She described it as "thrilling" when Stapleton accepted the offer, and she met him at Dave Cobb's studio in Nashville to work on the song "The Other Side of Blue". The first song she wrote for Rise was "Call You", a song about her grief over the death of her son Beckett in 2020, and expressing that writing through her emotions on that song allowed her to "dig deep into the rest of the album".

== Promotion ==
The album's lead single, "Don't You Want a Woman", was released on October 10, 2025; the song also serves as part of a partnership between Etheridge and the Kansas City Current women's soccer team. The second single, "Matches", was released on December 12, 2025 in tandem with the album announcement. The third single, "Bein' Alive", was released on February 25, 2026. A music video for the song was released the same day.

Etheridge embarked on The Rise Tour in promotion of the album, which began March 26, 2026 in Detroit and concluded on May 9, 2026, in Roanoke Rapids, North Carolina.

== Track listing ==
All tracks are written by Melissa Etheridge; "The Other Side of Blue" written with Chris Stapleton.

Rise track listing
No.	Title	Length
1.	"Bein' Alive"	3:47
2.	"Matches"	4:54
3.	"Rise"	4:20
4.	"Don't You Want a Woman"	3:38
5.	"The Other Side of Blue" (with Chris Stapleton)	4:02
6.	"If You Ever Leave Me"	3:57
7.	"Davina"	3:26
8.	"To Be a Woman"	4:25
9.	"Tomboy"	3:45
10.	"Call You"	3:33
11.	"More Love"	4:19
Total length:		44:06

== Personnel ==
Credits adapted from the album's liner notes.

- Melissa Etheridge – vocals, guitar, harmonica, production
- Shooter Jennings – synthesizer, piano, production, mixing on all tracks except "The Other Side of Blue", background vocals on "Rise" and "Davina"
- David Spreng – Mellotron, mixing, recording
- Zack Zajdel – engineering assistance
- Nate Haessly – engineering assistance
- Pete Lyman – mastering
- Daniel Bacigalupi – mastering assistance
- Max Hart – guitar, organ, keyboard, piano, pedal steel, lap steel, slide guitar
- Eric Gardner – drums
- Erik Kertes – bass
- Chris Stapleton – vocals and guitar on "The Other Side of Blue"
- Jon Arckey – background vocals on "Rise" and "Davina"
- Shelly Fairchild – background vocals on "Rise" and "Davina"
- Candice Lawler – creative direction, photography
- Julian Gross – design
- Chloe Badawy – styling
- Jill Colwell – hair and makeup

== Charts ==
Chart performance for Rise
Chart (2026)	Peak position
UK Americana Albums (OCC)	18
UK Independent Albums Breakers (OCC)	16
US Billboard 200	192
US Americana/Folk Albums (Billboard)	13
US Independent Albums (Billboard)	31
US Top Rock & Alternative Albums (Billboard)	50
