= Brave and Crazy =

1989 album by Melissa Etheridge

Studio album by Melissa Etheridge
- Released: September 11, 1989
- Recorded: January 24–26, March 1 and May 24–26, 1989
- Studios: A&M Studios (Hollywood, CA); Devonshire Sound Studios (North Hollywood, CA)
- Genre: Rock
- Length: 44:13
- Label: Island
- Producers: Melissa Etheridge; Niko Bolas; Kevin McCormick

Melissa Etheridge chronology
Melissa Etheridge (1988)	Brave and Crazy (1989)	Never Enough (1992)

Singles from Brave and Crazy
- 1. "No Souvenirs" Released: August 14, 1989; 2. "The Angels" Released: 1989; 3. "Let Me Go" Released: 1989; 4. "You Can Sleep While I Drive" Released: 1990

Professional ratings
Review scores
Source	Rating
AllMusic	3/5 stars
Q	4/5 stars
The Rolling Stone Album Guide	2/5 stars

Brave and Crazy is the second studio album by American singer-songwriter Melissa Etheridge, released by Island Records on September 11, 1989. As of 2010, the album has sold 632,000 copies in the United States alone, according to Nielsen SoundScan.

== Reception ==
Billboard commented that "though more polished, rocker's sophomore outing never sacrifices passion, emotion, and guts for style. Etheridge remains a one-trick artist - most of her songs are in a similar midtempo rocker guitar style - but her lyrics, delivered with startling conviction, lead her to the head of the class."

In their review, Cashbox stated that "Brave and Crazy documents an artist still stoking the furnace of desire...Alternating between somewhat balladic songs and fierce rockers, the album does not suffer the dreaded sophomore slump, but it does convey the suffering born of the blues...While much is said of Etheridge’s vocal instrument, her prowess as a 12-string ace is a large part of why her compositions succeed as well as they do."

Allmusic noted that "the throaty singer/guitarist/composer is slightly more reflective than on her first release, but no less confident. Nor is she is any less rootsy. Etheridge's earthiness is a large part of her appeal, and she uses it most advantageously...As introspective as things get on this CD, Etheridge never becomes wimpy or self-pitying. For all its vulnerability, Brave and Crazy is the work of someone who comes across as a survivor."

== Track listing ==
All tracks written by Melissa Etheridge, except where noted.

1. "No Souvenirs" – 4:33
2. "Brave and Crazy" – 4:37
3. "You Used to Love to Dance" – 5:33
4. "The Angels" – 4:38
5. "You Can Sleep While I Drive" – 3:14
6. "Testify" (Etheridge, Kevin McCormick) – 4:28
7. "Let Me Go" – 3:56
8. "My Back Door" – 4:24
9. "Skin Deep" – 3:10
10. "Royal Station 4/16" – 7:08

Note

- The album lists the running time of two songs incorrectly: "You Used to Love to Dance" actually runs 5:33 (not 4:33) and "Royal Station 4/16" runs 7:08 (not 6:40). The correct times are printed on the disc itself.

== Personnel ==
- Melissa Etheridge – vocals, twelve-string guitar, producer, arranger
- Bono – harmonica
- Bernie Larsen – electric guitar
- Mauricio-Fritz Lewak – drums
- Kevin McCormick – bass guitar, producer, arranger
- Scott Thurston – keyboards
- Waddy Wachtel – guitar (Note: Richard Wachtel is credited for guitar, on AllMusic, but this is a known error, and he is not credited on Discogs. Mauricio Fritz Sewak is also credited on bass, but this is likely a mistaken over-crediting of the drummer Mauricio-Fritz Lewak.)

Production

- Niko Bolas – producer, mixing, engineer
- Niko Bolas, Bob Vogt – engineer,
- Tom Banghart – assistant engineer
- Larry Goodwin – assistant engineer
- Randy Wine – assistant engineer
- Dennis Keeley – photography
- Robin Fredriksz – make-up

== Charts ==
Chart (1989)	Peak position
Australian Albums (ARIA)	9
Austrian Albums (Ö3 Austria)	14
Dutch Albums (Album Top 100)	51
German Albums (Offizielle Top 100)	7
New Zealand Albums (RMNZ)	5
Norwegian Albums (VG-lista)	18
Swedish Albums (Sverigetopplistan)	40
Swiss Albums (Schweizer Hitparade)	7
UK Albums (Official Charts)	63
US Billboard 200	22
Canadian Album Chart	5
Finnish Albums (The Official Finnish Charts)	38
European Albums (Eurotipsheet)	20

== Certifications and sales ==
Region	Certification	Certified units/sales
Australia (ARIA)	Platinum	70,000^{^}
Canada (Music Canada)	2× Platinum	200,000^{^}
New Zealand (RMNZ)	Gold	7,500^{^}
United States (RIAA)	Platinum	1,000,000^{^}
^{^} Shipments figures based on certification alone.
