= Never Enough (Melissa Etheridge album) =

Album by Melissa Etheridge

Studio album by Melissa Etheridge
- Released: March 17, 1992
- Recorded: 1992
- Studios: A&M Studios, Hollywood, CA
- Genre: Rock
- Length: 45:15
- Label: Island
- Producers: Melissa Etheridge, Kevin McCormick

Melissa Etheridge chronology
Brave and Crazy (1989)	Never Enough (1992)	Yes I Am (1993)

Singles from Never Enough
- 1. "Ain't It Heavy" Released: 1992; 2. "2001" Released: 1992; 3. "Dance Without Sleeping" Released: 1992; 4. "Must Be Crazy for Me" Released: 1993

Professional ratings
Review scores
Source	Rating
AllMusic	4/5 stars
Entertainment Weekly	B+
Q	4/5 stars
Rolling Stone	3/5 stars
The Rolling Stone Album Guide	1/5 stars

Never Enough is the third studio album by American singer-songwriter Melissa Etheridge, released by Island Records on March 17, 1992. As of 2010, the album has sold 997,000 copies in the United States alone, according to Nielsen SoundScan.

== Reception ==
Billboard called the album her "most mature effort yet, venturing into new stylistic and lyrical territories. The first single, "Ain't It Heavy," is already strong at album rock radio, while dance gem "2001 " Etheridge's most adventurous composition to date - promises to cross over from rock to pop to dance audiences. All-out commitment from label bodes well for the singer's third and strongest album."

Cashbox awarded the album their 'Pick of the Week', stating that "a more mature Melissa has returned with her third album...the 10-cut LP kicks off with the current single, "Ain't It Heavy," and is full of good rock 'n' roll as well as the funky, danceable "2001," and the very poignant "The Letting Go" which features Melissa alone, accompanying herself on piano.

In their review, Allmusic stated that "lyrically, it seemed to be the singer's most personal album yet...It was a risk to issue a record like Never Enough after a three-year hiatus and into a market that might have expected "Bring Me Some More Water." Etheridge's choice of a single was even more gutsy. "2001" sounded nothing like anything she had done before. Guided by stuttering, synthetic percussion and a guitar line reminiscent of the Edge's postmodern squawk on U2's "The Fly," "2001" was simultaneously one of the album's coolest and craziest songs. It further indicated Etheridge's maturation as a songwriter and helped make Never Enough her strongest statement to that point.

== Track listing ==
All tracks written by Melissa Etheridge, except where noted

1. "Ain't It Heavy" – 4:20
2. "2001" – 4:36
3. "Dance Without Sleeping" (Etheridge, Mauricio-Fritz Lewak, Kevin McCormick) – 5:40
4. "Place Your Hand" – 3:24
5. "Must Be Crazy for Me" – 3:43
6. "Meet Me in the Back" – 4:02
7. "The Boy Feels Strange" – 4:31
8. "Keep It Precious" – 6:13
9. "The Letting Go" – 3:05
10. "It's for You" (Etheridge, Kevin McCormick) – 5:41

== Personnel ==
- Melissa Etheridge – vocals, acoustic, electric guitar and 12-string guitars, piano
- Mark Goldenberg – electric guitars
- Steuart Smith – guitars
- Kevin McCormick – bass, high-strung guitar, backing vocals
- Scott Thurston – piano, keyboards
- Mauricio-Fritz Lewak – drums, percussion, backing vocals
- Richard Gibbs – keyboards on "It's For You"
- Ian McLagan – Hammond organ and piano on "Ain't It Heavy"
- Dermot Mulroney – cello on "Place Your Hand"
- Debra Dobkin – percussion on "Keep It Precious"

== Production ==
- Arranged and produced by Melissa Etheridge and Kevin McCormick
- Recorded by Gabe Veltri
- Mixed by Kevin McCormick and Gabe Veltri; assisted by John Aguto, Greg Goldman and Randy Wine
- Mastered by Stephen Marcussen
- Art Direction by Norm Ung
- Photography by Dennis Keeley

== Charts ==
=== Weekly charts ===
Chart (1992)	Peak position
Australian Albums (ARIA)	8
Austrian Albums (Ö3 Austria)	7
Dutch Albums (Album Top 100)	17
German Albums (Offizielle Top 100)	12
New Zealand Albums (RMNZ)	34
Norwegian Albums (VG-lista)	12
Swiss Albums (Schweizer Hitparade)	12
UK Albums (Official Charts)	56
US Billboard 200	21
Canadian Album Chart	19
European Albums (Eurotipsheet)	25

=== Year-end charts ===
Chart (1992)	Position
Dutch Albums (Album Top 100)	57
German Albums (Offizielle Top 100)	71

Singles – Billboard (North America)

Year	Single	Chart	Position
1992	"Ain't It Heavy"	Mainstream Rock Tracks	10
1992	"Dance Without Sleeping"	Adult Contemporary	24

== Certifications ==
Region	Certification	Certified units/sales
Canada (Music Canada)	Platinum	100,000^{^}
Netherlands (NVPI)	Gold	50,000^{^}
United States (RIAA)	Platinum	1,000,000^{^}
^{^} Shipments figures based on certification alone.
