= Melissa Etheridge (album) =

Album by Melissa Etheridge

Studio album by Melissa Etheridge
- Released: May 2, 1988
- Recorded: October 19–25, 1987
- Studio: Cherokee (Hollywood)
- Genre: Roots rock
- Length: 45:50
- Label: Island
- Producer: Melissa Etheridge; Niko Bolas; Craig Krampf; Kevin McCormick

Melissa Etheridge chronology
Melissa Etheridge (1988)	Brave and Crazy (1989)

Singles from Melissa Etheridge
- 1. "Bring Me Some Water" Released: 1988; 2. "Don't You Need" Released: 1988; 3. "Like the Way I Do" Released: 1988; 4. "Similar Features" Released: 1988; 5. "Chrome Plated Heart" Released: 1989

Melissa Etheridge is the debut album by American singer-songwriter Melissa Etheridge, released by Island Records on May 2, 1988.

The album was re-released on September 23, 2003, as a two-CD remastered edition containing a bonus disc of ten tracks recorded live at the Roxy in Los Angeles and a five-track session from BBC Kent in April 1988.

As of 2010, the album has tallied 1,145,000 copies in the United States alone, according to Nielsen SoundScan. This figure does not include sales of the album between 1988 and 1991.

== Reception ==
Professional ratings
Review scores
Source	Rating
AllMusic	4.5/5 stars
Q	(Deluxe edition)
The Rolling Stone Album Guide	2/5 stars
Uncut	(Deluxe edition)

Billboard called the album an "excellent debut" and "as varied as Etheridge is talented," noting that "Bring Me Some Water" should bring album rock radio to its knees, while "Similar Features" and several other tracks have broader - even AC appeal." "

In their review, Cashbox stated that "nobody this side of Tina Turner can belt like Melissa Etheridge. Insiders are calling her the next Janis Joplin, and she's certainly got the whiskey voice, the Texas twang and the hard-luck stories of sexual pain. But she's also got an identity of her own and a big future."

AllMusic called it "one of the most stunning debut albums of the 1980s....Etheridge's true talent, however, is reconciling uncontrollable emotions such as jealousy with a strong and fiercely independent spirit. Perhaps that's why Etheridge became a role model for a generation of young women who found her to be an uncompromising artist unafraid to expose (and celebrate) her strengths and weaknesses."

== Track listing ==
All tracks written by Melissa Etheridge.

1. "Similar Features" – 4:42
2. "Chrome Plated Heart" – 3:59
3. "Like the Way I Do" – 5:23
4. "Precious Pain" – 4:15
5. "Don't You Need" – 4:59
6. "The Late September Dogs" – 6:33
7. "Occasionally" – 2:36
8. "Watching You" – 5:33
9. "Bring Me Some Water" – 3:52
10. "I Want You" – 4:07

Note

- The album lists the running time of "I Want You" as 4:07, but the actual running time is 3:43.

Remastered edition bonus disc

1. "Chrome Plated Heart" – 3:55
2. "Don't You Need" – 4:54
3. "Similar Features" – 4:25
4. "Precious Pain" – 5:55
5. "Occasionally" – 3:11
6. "The Late September Dogs" – 6:34
7. "Watching You" – 5:57
8. "I Want You" – 5:26
9. "Bring Me Some Water" – 5:34
10. "Like The Way I Do" – 10:31
11. "Chrome Plated Heart" – 3:28
12. "Don't You Need" – 4:22
13. "Similar Features" – 4:07
14. "Bring Me Some Water" – 3:37
15. "Precious Pain" – 3:52

== Personnel ==
- Melissa Etheridge – 12-string Ovation acoustic guitar, vocals, production, arranger
- Johnny Lee Schell – guitar - additional overdubs
- Waddy Wachtel – guitar - additional overdubs
- Kevin McCormick – bass guitar, production
- Scott Thurston – keyboards - additional overdubs
- Wally Badarou – keyboards - additional overdubs
- Craig Krampf – drums, percussion, production, arranger

Overdubs recorded at Studio A, Sunset Sound Factory on November 16–18, 1987. Guitars on "Precious Pain" and "I Want You" recorded at Yo Dad Studio on October 25, 1987.

Technical

- Niko Bolas – production
- Chris Blackwell – executive producer
- Rob Fraboni – executive producer
- Engineers: Allan Blazek – engineer
- Jim Nipar – engineer
- David Kane – assistant engineer
- Duane Seykora – mixing assistant
- Bob Vogt – mixing assistant
- Stephen Marcussen – mastering
- George DuBose – photography
- Tony Wright – cover design

== Charts ==
=== Weekly charts ===
Weekly chart performance for Melissa Etheridge
Chart (1988–1993)	Peak position
Australian Albums (ARIA)	3
Austrian Albums (Ö3 Austria)	16
Canadian Albums (RPM)	9
Dutch Albums (Album Top 100)	9
German Albums (Offizielle Top 100)	36
New Zealand Albums (RMNZ)	3
Swedish Albums (Sverigetopplistan)	48
US Billboard 200	22

=== Year-end charts ===
1989 year-end chart performance for Melissa Etheridge
Chart (1989)	Position
Australian Albums (ARIA)	16
New Zealand Albums (RMNZ)	12
US Billboard 200	46

1993 year-end chart performance for Melissa Etheridge
Chart (1993)	Position
Dutch Albums (Album Top 100)	97

== Certifications and sales ==
Certifications and sales for Melissa Etheridge
Region	Certification	Certified units/sales
Australia (ARIA)	2× Platinum	300,000
Austria (IFPI Austria)	Gold	25,000^{*}
Canada (Music Canada)	3× Platinum	300,000^{^}
Germany (BVMI)	Gold	250,000^{^}
Netherlands (NVPI)	Gold	50,000^{^}
New Zealand (RMNZ)	Platinum	15,000^{^}
United States (RIAA)	2× Platinum	2,000,000^{^}
^{*} Sales figures based on certification alone.^{^} Shipments figures based on certification alone.
