= 4th Street Feeling =

Album by Melissa Etheridge

Studio album by Melissa Etheridge
- Released: September 4, 2012
- Studio: House Of Blues Studio, Encino, California
- Genre: Rock
- Length: 45:36
- Label: Island
- Producer: Jacquire King, Steve Booker

Melissa Etheridge chronology
Fearless Love (2010)	4th Street Feeling (2012)	This Is M.E. (2014)

Singles from 4th Street Feeling
- 1. "Falling Up" Released: 2012

4th Street Feeling is the twelfth studio album by American singer-songwriter Melissa Etheridge, released by Island Records on September 4, 2012. Produced by Jacquire King and Steve Booker, with all tracks co-produced by Etheridge, the album was recorded at the "House of Blues Studio" in Encino, California. It features twelve tracks on the standard release and three bonus tracks on the deluxe edition.

== Reception ==
Professional ratings
Review scores
Source	Rating
AllMusic	3.5/5 stars
Entertainment Weekly	(Positive)
People	3/4 stars
Rolling Stone	3.5/5 stars

Rolling Stone gave it 3.5 stars out of 5, stating, "producers Jacquire King and Steve Booker deftly curb her over-the-top tendencies" and, "The restraint serves her well. She's realized that sometimes holding a little back can make what's there hit with all the more force."

People magazine awarded the album 3 out of 4 stars, while Entertainment Weekly rated the album a B+.

AllMusic was also positive, giving the album 3.5 stars out of 5, and wrote, "4th Street Feeling is largely a return to form for Etheridge; a record that reaffirms her place as a songwriter and recording artist who is in a class of her own.

== Track listing ==
All songs written by Melissa Etheridge.

1. "Kansas City" – 3:20
2. "4th Street Feeling" – 3:33
3. "Falling Up" – 3:37
4. "Shout Now" – 3:17
5. "The Shadow of a Black Crow" – 3:18
6. "Be Real" – 3:52
7. "A Disaster" – 4:07
8. "Sympathy" – 3:52
9. "Enough Rain" – 2:49
10. "A Sacred Heart" – 4:23
11. "I Can Wait" – 3:30
12. "Rock and Roll Me" – 5:59

=== Bonus tracks ===
13. "You Will" – 3:22
14. "The Beating of Your Heart" – 3:37
15. "Change the World" – 3:24
16. "Just What you Asked For (iTunes bonus)" – 3:32

== Personnel ==
Performance Credits

- Melissa Etheridge – guitar, harmonica, piano, keyboards, vocals
- Steve Booker – keyboards
- Jon Kaplan – bass guitar
- Brett Simons – bass guitar
- Zac Rae – keyboards
- Blair Sinta – drums

Technical Credits

- Melissa Etheridge – Producer
- Steve Booker – Producer
- Richard Dodd – Mastering
- Jon Kaplan – Additional Production
- Doug Joswick – Package Production
- Jacquire King – Producer, Engineer
- Marc VanGool – Guitar Technician
- Eric Wong – Marketing
- Brad Bivens – Engineer
- Kristen Yiengst – Art Direction
- Smit – Engineer
- Steven Defino – Art Direction
- David Grant – Marketing
- Oliver Straus – Engineer
- Dave Morris – Marketing

== Charts ==
Chart (2012)	Peak position
Austrian Albums (Ö3 Austria)	50
Belgian Albums (Ultratop Flanders)	161
Dutch Albums (Album Top 100)	31
German Albums (Offizielle Top 100)	25
US Billboard 200	18
