= Greatest Hits: The Road Less Traveled =

Album by Melissa Etheridge

Greatest hits album by Melissa Etheridge
- Released: October 18, 2005
- Genre: Rock
- Length: 72:16
- Label: Island

Melissa Etheridge chronology
Lucky (2004)	Greatest Hits: The Road Less Traveled (2005)	The Awakening (2007)

Greatest Hits: The Road Less Traveled is a compilation album by American singer-songwriter Melissa Etheridge, released by Island Records on October 18, 2005. It featured 17 tracks from her then-17-year career, five of which were newly recorded.

Professional ratings
Review scores
Source	Rating
AllMusic	4.5/5 stars
ArtistDirect.com	(4.5/5)

== Reception ==
=== Critical reception ===
AllMusic rated the album 4 1/2 out of 5 stars, and stated "Greatest Hits: The Road Less Traveled is a comprehensive, entertaining, and ultimately redemptive collection from a woman who truly deserves it."

=== Commercial performance ===
The album peaked at No. 14 on the Billboard 200. With its release, Etheridge also released the single "Refugee", a cover of the Tom Petty song; it reached No. 96 on the Pop 100. Also released for radio was the new song "I Run for Life", written about her struggle with breast cancer. The song reached No. 80 on the Pop 100 and No. 10 on the Adult Contemporary charts.

The album was certified Gold in December 2005, for sales of over 500,000 copies. This was Etheridge's first Gold certification since Breakdown in 1999.

== Track listing ==
All songs by Melissa Etheridge, except where noted

1. "Refugee" (Tom Petty, Mike Campbell) – 3:37 [new track]
2. "Similar Features" – 4:44
3. "Like the Way I Do" – 5:25
4. "Bring Me Some Water" – 3:54
5. "You Can Sleep While I Drive" – 3:15
6. "No Souvenirs" – 4:33
7. "Ain't It Heavy" – 4:24
8. "I'm the Only One" – 4:16 [single edit]
9. "Come to My Window" – 3:35 [single edit]
10. "If I Wanted To" – 3:55
11. "I Want to Come Over" – 5:24
12. "Angels Would Fall" (Etheridge, John Shanks) – 4:39
13. "Lucky" – 3:58
14. "Christmas in America" – 4:21 [new track]
15. "Piece of My Heart" (Bert Berns, Jerry Ragovoy) – 4:19 [new track]
16. "This Is Not Goodbye" – 3:37 [new track]
17. "I Run for Life" – 4:21 [new track]
18. "I Need to Wake Up" – 3:36 [new track, on re-release only]

== Charts ==
Chart (2005)	Peak position
Dutch Albums (Album Top 100)	73
German Albums (Offizielle Top 100)	61
US Billboard 200	14

Singles – Billboard (United States)

Year	Single	Chart	Position
2005	"Refugee"	Pop 100	96
2005	"I Run for Life"	Pop 100	80
2005	"I Run for Life"	Adult Contemporary	10

== Certifications ==
Region	Certification	Certified units/sales
United States (RIAA)	Gold	500,000^{^}
^{^} Shipments figures based on certification alone.
