= Like the Way I Do =

1988 single by Melissa Etheridge

Single by Melissa Etheridge

from the album Melissa Etheridge
- B-side: "Like the Way I Do" (live)
- Released: 1988
- Studio: Cherokee I (Los Angeles)
- Length: 5:25
- Label: Island
- Songwriter: Melissa Etheridge
- Producers: Craig Krampf; Kevin McCormick; Melissa Etheridge; Niko Bolas

Melissa Etheridge singles chronology
"Don't You Need" (1988)	"Like the Way I Do" (1988)	"Similar Features" (1988)

"Like the Way I Do" is a song by American singer-songwriter Melissa Etheridge, released as the second US single from her first album, Melissa Etheridge (1988). In the United Kingdom, "Don't You Need" was released as the second single.

== Song information ==
The song was written years before the album was recorded. Melissa Etheridge had already played it during her live concerts, where it was the first of her own compositions that kept being requested by the audience. The intro of the song was created by coincidence when the singer played one of her other songs—"I Want You"—backwards on a cassette recorder.

"Like the Way I Do" is one of Etheridge's most famous songs and in her autobiography, she says, ""Like the Way I Do" is definitely one of my best songs. It is filled with passion and agony and desire and utter gut-wrenching pain. If you've ever seen me in concert, you know that when I perform that song, it becomes a part of me. It's a transforming song for both the audience and me."

Etheridge also says that the studio version is actually a short version of the song since when she performs it live, she improvises a lot which sometimes makes the song last 15 to 20 minutes.

== Chart performance ==
The song did not chart on the US Billboard Hot 100, but it was a minor hit on the Album Rock Tracks chart, where it reached No. 28. Seven years later, "Like the Way I Do" was re-released as the B-side to Yes I Am's final single, "If I Wanted To"; this allowed the track to chart on the Hot 100 for the first time, peaking at No. 42. Under the then Hot 100 rules, all of the combined retail sales points of the single were given to the A-side, so "Like the Way I Do" charted on radio airplay points alone.

In 1992, a live version of the song that Etheridge performed at the Roxy Theatre in October 1988 was released as a single in the Netherlands and Belgium, peaking at No. 2 in the former country and No. 38 in the latter in early 1993.

== Music video ==
"Like the Way I Do" was the first Etheridge song for which a video was produced. It was conceived and directed by Tony van den Ende. It shows the singer during a live concert and includes scenes both on stage and backstage. The place at which she is playing is a smaller bar or club with a smoky, rather dark atmosphere. It was produced in 1988 and is also included on the bonus DVD of her album Greatest Hits: The Road Less Traveled.

== Track listing ==
All songs were written by Melissa Etheridge.

A. "Like the Way I Do" – 5:25
B. "Like the Way I Do" (live) – 6:03

== Credits and personnel ==
Musicians

- Melissa Etheridge – acoustic guitar, vocals
- Johnny Lee Schell – guitar
- Kevin McCormick – bass guitar
- Craig Krampf – drums

Production

- Melissa Etheridge, Niko Bolas, Craig Krampf, Kevin McCormick – producers
- Chris Blackwell, Rob Fraboni – executive producers
- Allan Blazek, Jim Nipar – engineer
- David Kane – assistant engineer
- Duane Seykora, Bob Vogt – mixing assistants
- Stephen Marcussen – mastering
- Melissa Etheridge, Craig Krampf – arrangers
- George DuBose – photography
- Tony Wright – cover design

== Charts ==
=== Weekly charts ===
Original version

Chart (1988–1989)	Peak position
Australia (ARIA)	16
Netherlands (Dutch Top 40)	20
Netherlands (Single Top 100)	16
New Zealand (Recorded Music NZ)	17
Quebec (ADISQ)	30
US Mainstream Rock (Billboard)	28

Chart (1995)	Peak position
US Billboard Hot 100 B-side with "If I Wanted To"	16

Live version

Chart (1993)	Peak position
Belgium (Ultratop 50 Flanders)	38
Europe (Eurochart Hot 100)	65
Netherlands (Dutch Top 40)	3
Netherlands (Single Top 100)	2

=== Year-end charts ===
Original version

Chart (1989)	Position
Australia (ARIA)	77

Chart (1995)	Position
US Billboard Hot 100	90

Live version

Chart (1993)	Position
Netherlands (Dutch Top 40)	17
Netherlands (Single Top 100)	19

== Certifications ==
Region	Certification	Certified units/sales
Netherlands (NVPI)	Gold	50,000^{^}
^{^} Shipments figures based on certification alone.

== Cover versions ==
- German band 2-4 Grooves recorded the song under the title "The Way I Do" in a house version and released it as a usual single with another song as a B-side and on a remix single including the radio version and three additional remixes. The singles were released in October 2006 but did not chart. The band said that, before the release, the single was presented to Etheridge and she approved the version.
- Elli Erl, the winner of the second season of Deutschland sucht den Superstar (German Idol) performed the song several times during the season: for her original audition, in the first motto show ("My pop idol", finishing fourth out of 13) and in the final as her personal season highlight. In the show's fourth season, candidate Julia Falke performed the song in the second top 20 show making her proceed to the motto shows.
