= The Awakening (Melissa Etheridge album) =

Melissa Etheridge album

Studio album by Melissa Etheridge
- Released: September 25, 2007
- Genre: Rock
- Length: 59:17
- Label: Island
- Producer: Melissa Etheridge, David N. Cole

Melissa Etheridge chronology
Greatest Hits: The Road Less Traveled (2005)	The Awakening (2007)	A New Thought for Christmas (2008)

Professional ratings
Aggregate scores
Source	Rating
Metacritic	(66/100)
Review scores
Source	Rating
AllMusic	3.5/5 stars
The Boston Globe	(positive)
Entertainment Weekly	B−
Los Angeles Times	(mixed)
Robert Christgau	(choice cut)
Rolling Stone	3.5/5 stars

The Awakening is the ninth studio album by American singer-songwriter Melissa Etheridge, released by Island Records on September 25, 2007. The album conveys Etheridge's current autobiographical, religious and political perspectives. Etheridge made the album to convey parts of her story and journey along with her love for God. In the album's booklet, she included a letter to all who buy it starting with "Dear Friend".

The album debuted at No. 13 on the U.S. Billboard 200 chart, selling nearly 48,000 copies in its first week. As of 2010, the album has tallied 167,000 copies in the United States alone, according to Nielsen SoundScan. This album was No. 20 on Rolling Stone's list of the Top 50 Albums of 2007.

== Track listing ==
All songs written by Melissa Etheridge.

1. "All There Is" – 1:03
2. "California" – 3:47
3. "An Unexpected Rain" – 6:56
4. "Message to Myself" – 3:25
5. "God Is in the People" – 1:58
6. "Map of the Stars" – 5:31
7. "Threesome" – 3:33
8. "All We Can Really Do" – 1:18
9. "I've Loved You Before" – 4:16
10. "A Simple Love" – 1:17
11. "Heroes and Friends" – 4:23
12. "Kingdom of Heaven" – 4:11
13. "Open Your Mind" – 5:13
14. "The Awakening: The Universe Listened" – 3:09
15. "The Awakening: Imagine That" – 3:00
16. "The Awakening: What Happens Tomorrow" – 6:18

== Production ==
- Produced By Melissa Etheridge & David N. Cole
- Engineers: Jorge Costa & Jared Kvitka

== Personnel ==
- Melissa Etheridge – lead vocals, acoustic guitar, electric rhythm guitar
- Philip Sayce – lead guitar, backing vocals
- Mark Browne – bass guitar
- Mauricio "Fritz" Lewak – drums, percussion
- Rami Jaffee – keyboards, backing vocals
- David Cole – keyboards, percussion
- Bernadette "Bernie" Barlow – backing vocals
- Lily Wilson – backing vocals

== Charts ==
Chart (2007)	Peak positions
Austrian Albums (Ö3 Austria)	57
Dutch Albums (Album Top 100)	28
German Albums (Offizielle Top 100)	18
Swiss Albums (Schweizer Hitparade)	87
US Billboard 200	13
