= One Way Out (Melissa Etheridge album) =

Studio album by Melissa Etheridge
- Released: September 17, 2021
- Recorded: 2013 (live tracks: 2002)
- Venues: Live tracks: The Roxy, Los Angeles, California, United States
- Studios: Studio tracks: Henson Recording Studios, Los Angeles, California, United States
- Genre: Rock
- Length: 33:16
- Language: English
- Label: BMG
- Producer: Melissa Etheridge

Melissa Etheridge chronology
The Medicine Show (2019)	One Way Out (2021)	Rise (2026)

One Way Out is the sixteenth studio album by American singer-songwriter Melissa Etheridge, released by BMG on September 17, 2021.

== Recording and release ==
One Way Out is a 2013 recording of songs that Etheridge wrote in her early career, but felt like she couldn't release at the time. For this album, she reconnected with many of the musicians who backed her when she first started. These recordings were initially intended for a box set that ended up being canceled and were released as a stand-alone album instead, which the artist completed during her downtime in the COVID-19 pandemic to fulfill a request from her record label BMG Rights Management. To promote the release, she recorded a music video for "For the Last Time" and toured, performing these songs alongside hits from throughout her career.

== Reception ==
In a brief review ahead of the album's release, Tracy E. Gilchrist of The Advocate called this album a "return to form" for Etheridge. One Way Out was nominated for a GLAAD Media Award, losing to Montero by Lil Nas X at the 33rd award ceremony.

== Track listing ==
All songs written by Melissa Etheridge

1. "One Way Out" – 4:04
2. "As Cool as You Try" – 3:37
3. "I’m No Angel Myself" – 4:39
4. "For the Last Time" – 3:17
5. "Save Myself" – 3:21
6. "That Would Be Me" – 2:31
7. "Wild Wild Wild" – 3:22
8. "You Have No Idea (live) – 3:48
9. "Life Goes On (live) – 4:38

== Personnel ==
- Melissa Etheridge – vocals, guitar, harmonica on studio tracks, production
- Kenny Aronoff – drums on live tracks
- Niko Bolas – mixing and co-production on studio tracks
- Mark Browne – bass guitar on live tracks
- David Cole – mixing and co-production on live tracks
- Chris Gehringer – mastering
- James Harrah – guitar on live tracks
- Fritz Lewak – drums on studio tracks
- Kevin McCormick – bass guitar on studio tracks
- Darren Melchiorre – design
- John Shanks – guitar on studio tracks

== Charts ==
Chart performance for One Way Out
Chart (2021)	Peak position
Austrian Albums (Ö3 Austria)	59
German Albums (Offizielle Top 100)	30
Swiss Albums (Schweizer Hitparade)	31
US Top Album Sales (Billboard)	73
UK Americana Albums (Official Charts)	21

== See also ==
- 2002 in music
- 2013 in American music
- 2013 in rock music
- 2021 in American music
- 2021 in rock music
- List of 2021 albums
