= Lucky (Melissa Etheridge album) =

Album by Melissa Etheridge

Studio album by Melissa Etheridge
- Released: February 10, 2004
- Recorded: 2003
- Studio: The Village Recorder, Los Angeles, California; NRG Recording Studios, Los Angeles, California
- Genre: Rock
- Length: 54:03
- Label: Island
- Producer: Melissa Etheridge, David N. Cole, Ross Hogarth, Rick Parashar, John Shanks

Melissa Etheridge chronology
Skin (2001)	Lucky (2004)	Greatest Hits: The Road Less Traveled (2005)

Singles from Lucky
- 1. "Breathe" Released: January 12, 2004; 2. "This Moment" Released: 2004

Professional ratings
Aggregate scores
Source	Rating
Metacritic	(69/100)
Review scores
Source	Rating
AllMusic	4.5/5 stars
Billboard	(mixed)
Blender	2/5 stars
Entertainment Weekly	B−
PopMatters	7/10 stars
Rolling Stone	3/5 stars

Lucky is the eighth studio album by American singer-songwriter Melissa Etheridge, released by Island Records on February 10, 2004. The album made a debut on Billboard 200 chart at No. 15, with almost 92,000 copies sold.

The albums lead single, "Breathe", earned Etheridge a nomination for the Grammy Award for Best Female Rock Vocal Performance. "Tuesday Morning" was dedicated to the memory of Mark Bingham and his family and friends, paying tribute to all the heroes of 9/11.

Shortly after the album's release, Etheridge was diagnosed with breast cancer and was forced to cancel all promotion to undergo chemotherapy treatments.

== Track listing ==
All songs by Melissa Etheridge, except where noted

1. "Lucky" – 3:58
2. "This Moment" (Etheridge, Shanks) – 3:27
3. "If You Want To" – 3:08
4. "Breathe" (Armstrong, Dwiggins, Jordan, Randall, Wanninger) – 3:15
5. "Mercy" (Etheridge, Taylor) – 4:20
6. "Secret Agent" (Etheridge, Taylor) – 4:52
7. "Will You Still Love Me" – 4:13
8. "Meet Me in the Dark" – 5:34
9. "Tuesday Morning" (Etheridge, Taylor) – 4:49
10. "Giant" – 5:15
11. "Come on Out Tonight" – 3:12
12. "Kiss Me" – 3:54
13. "When You Find the One" – 4:06

== Credits ==
=== Personnel ===
- Melissa Etheridge – acoustic guitar, piano, electric guitar, lead vocals
- Kenny Aronoff – percussion, drums, tambourine
- Bernie Barlow – background vocals ("Mercy")
- Jay Bellerose – drums, programming
- Mark Browne – bass guitar
- Paul Bushnell – bass guitar
- Jon Plum – keyboards, programming
- Brandi Carlile – background vocals
- David Channing – baritone guitar
- David N. Cole – keyboards, programming
- Trace Foster – guitar, keyboards
- James Harrah – electric guitar
- Ross Hogarth – keyboards
- Richard (Rick) Hopkins – Hammond organ
- Rami Jaffee – keyboards
- Matt Laug – percussion, drums
- Kipp Lennon – background vocals
- Brian MacLeod – drums
- Jamie Muhoberac – keyboards
- Dean Parks – acoustic guitar, mandolin, electric guitar
- Josh Freese – drums
- Blues Saraceno – electric guitar
- Philip Sayce – guitar
- Eric Schermerhorn – electric guitar
- John Shanks – acoustic guitar, electric guitar
- Cameron Stone – cello
- Jonathan Taylor – programming
- Jeffrey C.J. Vanston – bass guitar, keyboards, programming
- Patrick Warren – keyboards

=== Production ===
- Producers: Melissa Etheridge, David N. Cole, Ross Hogarth, Rick Parashar, John Shanks
- Engineers: David N. Cole, Marc DeSisto, Ross Hogarth, Terese Joseph, Christian Mack, Rick Parashar, Jeff Rothschild, Mark Valentine
- Assistant engineers: Keith Armstrong, Jaime Sickora
- Mixing: Ross Hogarth, Chris Lord-Alge, Geoff Ott, Rick Parashar
- Digital editing: David Channing, Christian Mack
- Tracking assistants: Sergio Chavez, Mark Kiczula, Joey Paradise, Jeremy Parker, Shawn "Fox" Phelps
- A&R: Jeff Fenster, Tara Podolsky, Paul Pontius
- Production coordination: Steven Girmant
- Coordination: Shari Sutcliffe
- Assistants: Chris Reynolds, Honchol Sin, Jason Warner
- Creative director: Rick Patrick
- Art direction: Sara Cumings, Jeri Heiden
- Design: Sara Cumings, Jeri Heiden
- Illustrations: Tavis Coburn
- Photography: Cynthia Daniels

== Charts ==
Chart (2004)	Peak position
Austrian Albums (Ö3 Austria)	40
Dutch Albums (Album Top 100)	29
German Albums (Offizielle Top 100)	18
Swiss Albums (Schweizer Hitparade)	51
US Billboard 200	15

Singles – Billboard (North America)

Year	Single	Chart	Position
2004	"Breathe"	Hot 100	106
2004	"Breathe"	Adult Contemporary	22
2004	"Breathe"	Adult Top 40	9
2004	"Lucky"	Adult Alternative	17
2004	"This Moment"	Adult Top 40	34
