= I Want to Be in Love =

2001 single by Melissa Etheridge

Single by Melissa Etheridge

from the album Skin
- Released: June 25, 2001
- Recorded: Sunset Sound
- Length: 3:34
- Label: Island
- Songwriter: Melissa Etheridge
- Producer: Melissa Etheridge

Melissa Etheridge singles chronology
"Stronger Than Me" (2000)	"I Want to Be in Love" (2001)	"Breathe" (2004)

"I Want to Be in Love" is a song by American singer-songwriter Melissa Etheridge, released as the first single from her seventh studio album, Skin, in June 2001.

== Music video ==
The music video was directed by David Hogan and stars American actress Jennifer Aniston as the girl in the party who comes across several characters.

== Accolades ==
Year	Award	Category	Result	Ref.
2002	Grammy Award	Best Female Rock Vocal Performance	Nominated	

== Charts ==
=== Weekly charts ===
Chart (2001)	Peak position
Australia (ARIA)	79
Netherlands (Single Top 100)	80
Quebec (ADISQ)	21
US Adult Alternative Airplay (Billboard)	5
US Adult Pop Airplay (Billboard)	20

=== Year-end charts ===
Chart (2001)	Position
US Adult Top 40 (Billboard)	60
US Triple-A (Billboard)	39

== Release history ==
Region	Date	Format(s)	Label(s)	Ref.
United States	June 25, 2001	Adult contemporary; hot adult contemporary; modern adult contemporary; triple A radio	Island	
Australia	August 27, 2001	CD	Island	
