= This Is M.E. =

Album by Melissa Etheridge

Studio album by Melissa Etheridge
- Released: September 30, 2014
- Genre: Rock
- Length: 41:11
- Label: ME Records
- Producer: Jerry Wonda, RoccStar, Jerrod Bettis, Jon Levine, Melissa Etheridge

Melissa Etheridge chronology
4th Street Feeling (2012)	This Is M.E. (2014)	A Little Bit of Me: Live In L.A. (2015)

Singles from This Is M.E.
- 1. "Take My Number" Released: July 1, 2014; 2. "Monster" Released: March 30, 2015

This Is M.E. is the thirteenth studio album by American singer-songwriter Melissa Etheridge, released on September 30, 2014 by Etheridge's own label ME Records, which is distributed by Primary Wave Records. It features eleven tracks on the standard release and four bonus tracks on the Target exclusive version.

== Reception ==
=== Chart history ===
In its first week on the Billboard 200, This Is M.E. debuted at No. 21. It also debuted at No. 23 on the Digital Albums chart, and No. 5 on the Top Rock Albums chart, selling 14,000 copies in the first week. The album has sold 50,000 copies in the United States as of September 2016.

=== Critical reception ===
Allmusic said of the album, "There's something appealing in hearing Etheridge try a number of new sounds: not everything fits but the restlessness is admirable", and awarded the album three stars. Rolling Stone also awarded the album three stars, and wrote "As always, her voice can walk a fine line between passionate and histrionic, but when she dials it back on the smoldering 'Like A Preacher', it's clear that this honeymoon might be the start of a whole new her."

== Promotion ==
=== Album cover ===
On June 18, 2014, Etheridge posted a video to her YouTube page calling for fans to submit photos of themselves for her new album cover. Etheridge said of this "Because my fans are such a huge part of ME, and I wouldn't be ME without YOU, I took photos submitted by my fans and turned it into my album cover". The finished album cover is a mosaic of numerous small photos of fans, with colors slightly tinted to form the appearance of Etheridge.

=== Press tour and YouTube duet ===
Etheridge embarked on an extensive promotional tour in support of the album, appearing on such shows as The Meredith Vieira Show, Entertainment Tonight, The View, Good Morning America, and Live with Kelly and Michael. On October 3, 2014, singer/songwriter Sam Tsui released a video on YouTube of his cover of "A Little Hard Hearted," in which featured Etheridge as well.

== Track listing ==
All songs written or co-written by Melissa Etheridge.

Standard version
No.	Title	Writer(s)	Length
1.	"I Won't Be Alone Tonight"	Melissa Etheridge, Jon Levine	4:28
2.	"Take My Number"	Etheridge, Jerrod Bettis	3:55
3.	"A Little Hard Hearted"	Etheridge, Levine	3:49
4.	"Do It Again"	Etheridge, Arden Altino, Jerry "Wonda" Duplessis, Angela Hunte	2:59
5.	"Monster"	Etheridge, Altino, Duplessis	3:29
6.	"Ain't That Bad"	Etheridge, Leon "RoccStar" Youngblood Jr., Adam Kapit	3:12
7.	"All the Way Home"	Etheridge, Levine	4:14
8.	"Like a Preacher"	Etheridge, Bettis, Noah Diamond, Kelsy Karter	4:05
9.	"Stranger Road"	Etheridge, Levine	3:25
10.	"A Little Bit of Me"	Etheridge, Bettis, Christian Seibert	3:26
11.	"Who Are You Waiting For"	Etheridge	4:09
Total length:			41:11

Target Exclusive bonus tracks / Australian release
No.	Title	Writer(s)	Length
12.	"Favorite Song"	Etheridge, Levine	3:33
13.	"What I Do"	Etheridge, Altino, Duplessis, Hunte, Bernard Grobman	3:47
14.	"Soul Brothers"	Etheridge, Mark Batson	2:52
15.	"Saturday Dancing"	Etheridge, Mark Batson	3:18
Total length:			55:39

== Personnel ==
Performance Credits

- Melissa Etheridge – guitar, harmonica, piano, vocals
- Bernard Grobman – guitar, steel guitar
- Jon Levine – Hammond organ, bass guitar, piano, clavinet, glockenspiel, keyboards
- Randy Cooke – drums
- Angela Hunte – vocals
- Natalie Walker – vocals
- Jonathan Li – voices
- Farrah "Fendi" Fleurimond – vocals
- MBF – voices
- Jerrod Bettis – bass guitar
- Melissa Papp – voices
- Amritha Vaz – strings
- Neyla Pekarek – cello, vocals
- Jon Sosin – banjo, ukulele
- Bruce Crews – voices
- Jamale Hopkins – percussion, drums
- Roccstar – guitar
- Brie Biblow – voices
- Natalie Loren Walker – vocals
- Robert L. Morris jr – drums, percussion

Technical Credits

- Melissa Etheridge – Composer, Executive Producer
- Stephen Marcussen – Mastering
- Jon Levine – Composer, Producer
- Jerry "Wonda" Duplessis – Composer, Producer
- Josh Grabelle – Artwork
- J.J. Blair – Engineer
- Arden Altino – Composer
- Angela Hunte – Composer
- Sergio "Sergical" Tsai – Engineer
- Adam Kapit – Composer, Producer
- Nick Radovanovic – Associate Remixing Engineer
- Arden "Keyz" Altino – Producer
- Daniel Piscina – Engineer
- Christian Seibert – Composer
- Josh Gwilliam – Engineer
- Andrew Robertson – Engineer
- Jerrod Bettis – Composer, Producer
- Lance Powell – Engineer
- Todd Hurtt – Engineer
- Roccstar – Composer, Producer
- Ralph Rhim – Engineer
- Noah Diamond – Composer
- Kelsey Eckstein – Composer
- Ralph Phim – Engineer
- Marcel Pariseau – Public Relations

== Charts ==
Chart (2014–15)	Peak position
Australian Albums (ARIA)	34
Austrian Albums (Ö3 Austria)	61
Belgian Albums (Ultratop Flanders)	106
Dutch Albums (Album Top 100)	34
German Albums (Offizielle Top 100)	41
Swiss Albums (Schweizer Hitparade)	96
US Billboard 200	21
US Independent Albums (Billboard)	2
US Top Rock Albums (Billboard)	5
