= Skin (Melissa Etheridge album) =

Album by Melissa Etheridge

Studio album by Melissa Etheridge
- Released: July 10, 2001
- Recorded: 2000–2001
- Studio: The Village Recorder, Los Angeles, California; Capitol Studios, Los Angeles, California
- Genre: Rock
- Length: 38:40
- Label: Island
- Producer: Melissa Etheridge; David N. Cole

Melissa Etheridge chronology
Breakdown (1999)	Skin (2001)	Lucky (2004)

Singles from Skin
- 1. "I Want to Be in Love" Released: 2001

Professional ratings
Aggregate scores
Source	Rating
Metacritic	(73/100)
Review scores
Source	Rating
AllMusic	3/5 stars
Entertainment Weekly	B−
PopMatters	8/10 stars
Q	4/5 stars
Rolling Stone	3.5/5 stars

Skin is the seventh studio album by American singer-songwriter Melissa Etheridge, released by Island Records on July 10, 2001. The album explores the pain, confusion, grief, and recovery Etheridge went through following her split from Julie Cypher, her companion of 12 years. "Heal Me" features background vocals by Laura Dern and Meg Ryan. Etheridge plays almost all the instruments and penned all the songs.

Skin peaked at No. 9 on the Billboard 200, and the lead single "I Want to Be in Love" earned Etheridge a nomination for the Grammy Award for Best Female Rock Vocal Performance.

== Track listing ==
All tracks are written by Melissa Etheridge.

No.	Title	Length
1.	"Lover Please"	3:27
2.	"The Prison"	4:59
3.	"Walking on Water"	3:04
4.	"Down to One"	3:56
5.	"Goodnight"	3:33
6.	"It's Only Me"	3:40
7.	"I Want to Be in Love"	3:43
8.	"Please Forgive Me"	4:43
9.	"The Different"	4:06
10.	"Heal Me"	3:39
Total length:		39:20

There is one known outtake titled 'Whispers in the Heart' 'My Heart' or 'Heart Whispers'

== Personnel ==
- Melissa Etheridge – guitar, harmonica, mandolin, keyboards, vocals, background vocals
- Kenny Aronoff – drums
- Mark Browne – bass guitar
- David Cole – keyboards, programming
- Abe Laboriel Jr. – programming
- Meg Ryan – background vocals on "Heal Me"
- Laura Dern – background vocals on "Heal Me"
- Gota Yashiki – programming

== Production ==
- Producers: Melissa Etheridge, David N. Cole
- Engineer: David N. Cole
- Assistant engineers: Steve Genewick, Charles Paakkari
- Mixing: David N. Cole, Chris Lord-Alge, Sylvia Massy, Matt Silva
- Mastering: Ted Jensen
- Drum programming: David N. Cole
- Production coordination: Steven Girmant
- Assistants: Charles Paakkari, Matt Silva
- Art direction: Rick Patrick
- Photography: Dan Winters

== Charts ==
Chart (2001)	Peak position
Australian Albums (ARIA)	30
Austrian Albums (Ö3 Austria)	35
Canadian Albums Chart	18
Dutch Albums (Album Top 100)	30
German Albums (Offizielle Top 100)	10
Swiss Albums (Schweizer Hitparade)	65
US Billboard 200	9
European Albums (Eurotipsheet)	38

Singles – Billboard (North America)

Year	Single	Chart	Position
2001	"I Want to Be in Love"	Adult Top 40	20
