= I Need to Wake Up =

- Single cover

Single by Melissa Etheridge

from the album An Inconvenient Truth
- Released: July 11, 2006
- Genre: Pop
- Length: 3:35
- Label: Island; The Island Def Jam Music Group
- Songwriter(s): Melissa Etheridge

Melissa Etheridge singles chronology
"I Run for Life" (2005)	"I Need to Wake Up" (2006)	"Message to Myself" (2007)

"I Need to Wake Up" is a song by Melissa Etheridge, written for the 2006 documentary film, An Inconvenient Truth. It is the first instance of a documentary film winning the Best Song category, beating three songs nominated from the musical film Dreamgirls and one from the Pixar animated film Cars.

Etheridge received the 2006 Academy Award for Best Original Song for "I Need to Wake Up". Upon receiving the award, she noted in her acceptance speech:

Mostly I have to thank Al Gore, for inspiring us, for inspiring me, showing that caring about the Earth is not Republican or Democrat; it's not red or blue, it's all green.

The song was on the enhanced version only of her greatest hits album, The Road Less Traveled.
