= Bring Me Some Water =

1988 single by Melissa Etheridge

Single by Melissa Etheridge

from the album Melissa Etheridge
- B-side: "Occasionally"
- Released: 1988
- Studio: Cherokee I (Los Angeles)
- Genre: Rock
- Length: 3:52
- Label: Island
- Songwriter: Melissa Etheridge
- Producers: Craig Krampf; Kevin McCormick; Melissa Etheridge; Niko Bolas

Melissa Etheridge singles chronology
| "Bring Me Some Water" (1988) | "Don't You Need" (1988) |

Music video
- "Bring Me Some Water" on YouTube

"Bring Me Some Water" is a song by American singer Melissa Etheridge. It was released in 1988 as her debut single and became a hit in several countries, reaching the top 20 in Australia, New Zealand, and on the US Billboard Album Rock Tracks chart.

== Song information ==
Melissa Etheridge wrote the song after the initial version of her debut album was rejected by the recording company, which left her only four days to provide new material and a modified edition of the album. At the time, she was residing in Los Angeles while her girlfriend, Kathleen, lived elsewhere. As a result, Etheridge had reluctantly agreed to make their relationship a non-monogamous one. The song tells about the pain and jealousy arising from thoughts of her lover being intimate with someone else. There are many metaphors in the lyrics describing her emotional state, principally the chorus line: "Somebody bring me some water – can't you see I'm burning alive." Many other songs on the album deal with the same subject.

Musically, "Bring Me Some Water" is a classic rock song with some blues themes. During an interview featured on the bonus DVD of Greatest Hits: The Road Less Traveled, Etheridge says:

"I remember sitting in my living room and I loved the blues. I am of the rock 'n' roll school where it comes from the rhythm and blues based music, and so there was this kind of beat that I wanted."

Furthermore, she states that, of all the songs she has written, "Bring Me Some Water" is the one with the highest recognition value and that wherever she plays the song in the world, everybody at her concerts knows the song after the first seconds of the intro.

Etheridge has collaborated with contemporary pop musicians on two notable recorded-live television performances of this song: Joan Osborne, who appeared as one of several guest artists on the inaugural November 22, 1995, episode of the VH1 Duets series; and Kelly Clarkson on the September 17, 2009 VH1 Divas concert special.

"Bring Me Some Water" was remade by American blues artist Koko Taylor and recorded on her 2000 album, Royal Blue.

== Track listings ==
All songs were written by Melissa Etheridge.

7-inch and Australian cassette single

A. "Bring Me Some Water" – 3:52
B. "Occasionally" – 2:36

UK 12-inch and CD single

1. "Bring Me Some Water" – 3:52
2. "Occasionally" – 2:36
3. "I Want You" – 4:07

Australian 12-inch single

A1. "Bring Me Some Water"
B1. "Occasionally"
B2. "Similar Features" (live)

== Personnel ==
- Melissa Etheridge – acoustic guitar, guitar, vocals
- Wally Badarou – keyboard
- Craig Krampf – percussion, drums
- Kevin McCormick – bass
- Johnny Lee Schell – guitar
- Scott Thurston – keyboard
- Waddy Wachtel – guitar
- Production: Melissa Etheridge, Niko Bolas, Craig Krampf, Kevin McCormick
- Executive production: Chris Blackwell, Rob Fraboni
- Engineering: Allan Blazek, Jim Nipar
- Assistant engineering: David Kane
- Mixing assistance: Duane Seykora, Bob Vogt
- Mastering: Stephen Marcussen
- Arrangement: Melissa Etheridge, Craig Krampf
- Photography: George DuBose
- Cover design: Tony Wright

== Charts ==
=== Weekly charts ===
| Chart (1988–1989) | Peak position |
|---|---|
| Australia (ARIA) | 9 |
| Canada Top Singles (RPM) | 34 |
| New Zealand (Recorded Music NZ) | 17 |
| Quebec (ADISQ) | 28 |
| UK Singles (Official Charts) | 100 |
| US Mainstream Rock (Billboard) | 10 |

=== Year-end charts ===
| Chart (1989) | Position |
|---|---|
| Australia (ARIA) | 82 |
