= The Medicine Show (album) =

Studio album by Melissa Etheridge
- Released: April 12, 2019
- Recorded: 2018
- Studio: Multiview Studios (Hollywood, CA)
- Genre: Americana, rock
- Length: 42:06
- Label: Concord, MLE
- Producer: John Shanks, Melissa Etheridge

Melissa Etheridge chronology
MEmphis Rock and Soul (2016)	The Medicine Show (2019)	One Way Out (2021)

The Medicine Show is the fifteenth studio album by American singer-songwriter Melissa Etheridge. The album was released on April 12, 2019, by Concord Records and her own MLE Music.

== Recording and release ==
The Medicine Show follows a 2016 collection of soul covers MEmphis Rock and Soul that connected with Etheridge's roots as a music fan. While promoting that release, she became concerned about the political climate of the United States and felt compelled to write new music that reflected the historic times after the 2016 United States presidential election.

== Critical reception ==
Professional ratings
Aggregate scores
Source	Rating
Metacritic	66/100
Review scores
Source	Rating
AllMusic	3/5 stars
American Songwriter	3.5/5 stars

The Medicine Show received generally positive reviews from critics. At Metacritic, which assigns a normalized rating out of 100 to reviews from critics, the album received an average score of 66, which indicates "generally favorable reviews", based on 4 reviews.

== Track listing ==
No.	Title	Length
1.	"The Medicine Show"	2:27
2.	"Wild and Lonely"	4:32
3.	"Shaking"	3:05
4.	"Woman Like You"	4:32
5.	"Faded by Design"	3:37
6.	"I Know You"	4:44
7.	"This Human Chain"	3:51
8.	"Love Will Live"	4:09
9.	"Here Comes the Pain"	3:56
10.	"Suede"	3:58
11.	"Last Hello"	3:58
Total length:		42:06

Target bonus tracks
No.	Title	Length
12.	"A Better Me"	4:15
13.	"Maybe"	4:08

== Credits ==
Musicians

- Melissa Etheridge – lead vocals and backing vocals, acoustic and electric guitars, keyboards, co-producer
- John Shanks – acoustic and electric guitars, keyboards, producer
- Chris Chaney – bass (tracks 1–10)
- Paul Lamalfa – bass guitar (tracks 11–13), synthesizer, engineer
- Max Hart – keyboards (tracks 2, 4, 5, 7–9)
- Victor Indrizzo – drums, percussion

Production

- Melissa Etheridge, John Shanks – production
- Keith Gretlein – engineer
- Joe LaPorta – mastering
- Michael H. Brauer – mixing

== Charts ==
Chart (2019)	Peak position
Austrian Albums (Ö3 Austria)	74
Belgian Albums (Ultratop Flanders)	168
Canadian Albums (Billboard)	74
Dutch Albums (Album Top 100)	85
German Albums (Offizielle Top 100)	29
Swiss Albums (Schweizer Hitparade)	44
US Billboard 200	95
US Top Rock Albums (Billboard)	14
Scottish Albums (OCC)	87
Australian Digital Albums (ARIA)	21
UK Americana Albums (OCC)	4
