= Melissa Etheridge =

American singer-songwriter (born 1961)

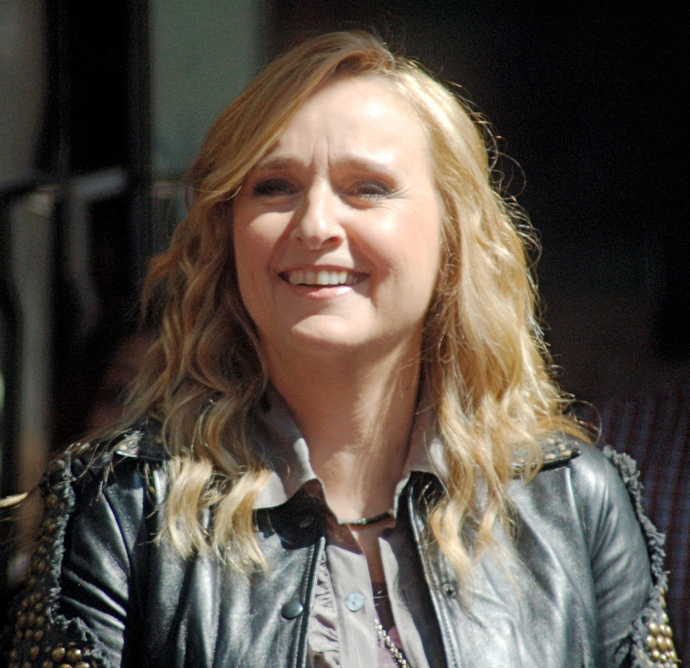
- Etheridge in 2011
- Born: Melissa Lou Etheridge; May 29, 1961 (age 65); Leavenworth, Kansas, U.S.
- Occupations: Singer; songwriter; musician
- Years active: 1985–present
- Political party: Democratic
- Spouse: Linda Wallem (m. 2014)
- Partners: Julie Cypher (cohab. 1990; sep. 2000); Tammy Lynn Michaels (c.p. 2003; sep. 2010)
- Children: 4
- Musical career
- Genres: Rock; Americana
- Instruments: Vocals; guitar; piano
- Labels: Island; ME; Stax; Concord; BMG; Sun
- Website: melissaetheridge.com

Melissa Lou Etheridge (born May 29, 1961) is an American rock singer, songwriter, and guitarist. Her self-titled debut album was released in 1988 and became an underground success. It peaked at No. 22 on the Billboard 200 and its lead single, "Bring Me Some Water", garnered Etheridge her first Grammy Award nomination for Best Rock Vocal Performance, Female in 1989. Her second album, Brave and Crazy, appeared that same year and earned Etheridge two more Grammy nominations. In 1992, Etheridge released her third album, Never Enough, and its lead single, "Ain't It Heavy", won Etheridge her first Grammy Award.

In 1993, she released what would become her mainstream breakthrough album, Yes I Am. Its tracks "I'm the Only One", "If I Wanted To", and "Come to My Window" all reached the Top 40 in the United States, while the latter earned Etheridge her second Grammy Award. Yes I Am spent 138 weeks on the Billboard 200, peaking at No. 15, and earning a RIAA certification of 6× Platinum, her largest selling album to date. Her fifth album, Your Little Secret, was released in 1995 and peaked at No. 6 on the Billboard 200, her highest-charting album to date. Its tracks "Nowhere to Go" and "I Want to Come Over" both reached the Top 40 in the United States.

Etheridge achieved further success with her albums Breakdown (1999), Skin (2001), and Lucky (2004). In October 2004, she was diagnosed with breast cancer, and underwent surgery and chemotherapy. At the 2005 Grammy Awards, she made a return to the stage, performing a tribute to Janis Joplin with Joss Stone. Stone began the performance with "Cry Baby" and Etheridge, bald from chemotherapy, joined her to perform the song "Piece of My Heart". Their performance was widely acclaimed. Later that year, Etheridge released her first compilation album, Greatest Hits: The Road Less Traveled. A great commercial success, it peaked at No. 14 on the Billboard 200, and went Gold almost immediately. Etheridge has released 17 studio albums to date, the most recent being Rise (2026).

Etheridge is known for music with a mixture of "confessional lyrics, pop-based folk-rock, and raspy, smoky vocals". She has been a gay and lesbian rights activist since her public coming out in January 1993. Among her various accolades, Etheridge has received two Grammy Awards (from 15 nominations), and an Academy Award for Best Original Song for "I Need to Wake Up" from the film An Inconvenient Truth (2006). In September 2011, she received a star on the Hollywood Walk of Fame. In 2026, Etheridge was nominated for the Rock and Roll Hall of Fame.

== Early life and career ==
Etheridge was born in Leavenworth, Kansas, the younger of two daughters of Elizabeth (Williamson), a computer consultant, and John Etheridge, an American Constitution teacher at her alma mater, Leavenworth High School. John Etheridge died in August 1991.

Etheridge began guitar lessons when she was eight. She started to play in local country music groups in her teenage years and graduated from high school in 1979. While attending college at Berklee College of Music, Etheridge played the club circuit around Boston. After three semesters, Etheridge decided to drop out of Berklee and move to Los Angeles to attempt a career in music.

== Career ==
=== 1982–1992: Road to rock stardom ===
Etheridge was discovered at Vermie's, a bar in Pasadena, California. She had made some friends on a women's soccer team, and those new friends came to see her play. One of the women was Karla Leopold, whose husband, Bill Leopold, was a manager in the music business. Karla convinced Bill to see Etheridge perform live. He was impressed, and became a pivotal part of Etheridge's career. This, in addition to her gigs in lesbian bars around Los Angeles, led to her discovery by Island Records chief Chris Blackwell. She signed a publishing deal to write songs for films including the 1986 movie Weeds.

After an unreleased first effort that was rejected by Island Records as being too polished and glossy, she completed her stripped-down, self-titled debut in just four days. Her eponymous debut album Melissa Etheridge (1988), was an underground hit, and the single "Bring Me Some Water" performed well on radio and was nominated for a Grammy Award.

At the time of the album's release, it was not generally known that Etheridge was a lesbian. While on the road promoting the album, she paused in Memphis, Tennessee, to be interviewed for the syndicated radio program Pulsebeat—Voice of the Heartland, explaining the intensity of her music by saying: "People think I'm really sad—or really angry. But my songs are written about the conflicts I have...I have no anger toward anyone else." She invited the radio syndication producer to attend her concert that night. He did and was surprised to find himself one of the few men in attendance.

Etheridge's second album, Brave and Crazy, was released in 1989. Brave and Crazy followed the same musical formula as her eponymous debut; it also garnered a Grammy nomination. The album peaked at No. 22 on the Billboard charts (equal to her first album). Etheridge then went on the road, like one of her musical influences, Bruce Springsteen, and built a loyal fan base.

In 1992, Etheridge released her third album, Never Enough. Similar to her prior two albums, Never Enough didn't reach the top of the charts, peaking at No. 21, but gave Etheridge her first Grammy for Best Rock Vocal Performance, Female for her single "Ain't It Heavy". Never Enough was considered a more personal and mature album from Etheridge at that time. With rumors circulating around her sexuality (Etheridge was not out yet at this point), the album seemed to inadvertently address these rumors.

In 1992, Etheridge established a performing arts scholarship at Leavenworth High School in honor of her recently deceased father. According to Etheridge, her father purchased her first guitar and "would come with me to bars in the area when I played because I was underage".

=== 1993–1995: Yes I Am and Your Little Secret ===
In January 1993, Etheridge came out publicly as a lesbian. On September 21, 1993, she released Yes I Am, which became her mainstream breakthrough album. Co-produced with Hugh Padgham, Yes I Am spent 138 weeks on the Billboard 200 charts and peaked at No. 15. It scored two mainstream hits: "Come to My Window" and her only Billboard Top 10 single, "I'm the Only One", which also hit No. 1 on Billboard's Adult Contemporary chart. Yes I Am earned a RIAA certification of 6× platinum.

Etheridge earned her second Grammy for Best Rock Vocal Performance, Female for her single "Come to My Window". She also garnered two additional nominations in the Best Rock Song category for "I'm the Only One" and "Come to My Window", losing to Bruce Springsteen's "Streets of Philadelphia".

In 1993, Etheridge boycotted playing shows in Colorado over its passage of Amendment 2.

Also in 1994, she was honored by VH-1 for her work with the AIDS organization L.A. Shanti. During the televised occasion, she highlighted the appearance with a performance of "I'm the Only One" and a duet with Sammy Hagar covering The Rolling Stones' song, "Honky Tonk Women."

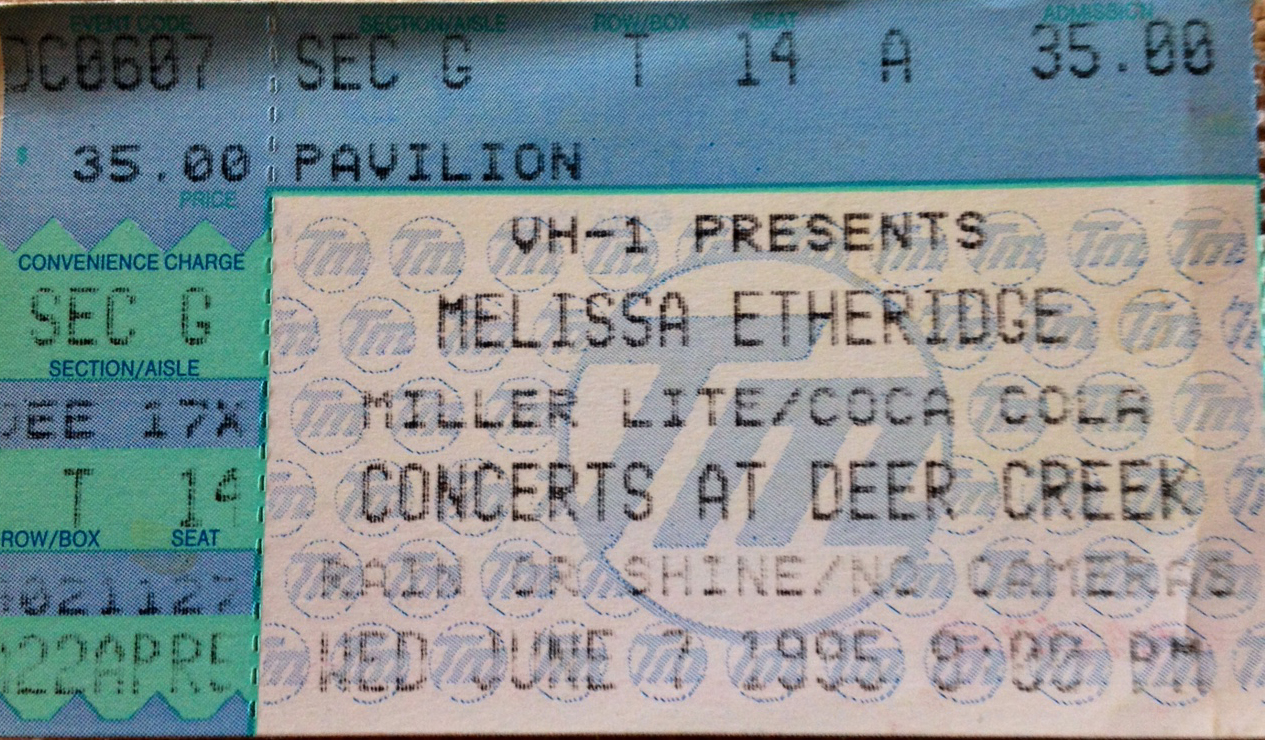
Melissa Etheridge concert ticket, 1995

The album's fifth single, "If I Wanted To", debuted on the Billboard Hot 100 at No. 25 in February 1995 and peaked at No. 16 later that March.

The success of Yes I Am helped increase sales of Etheridge's earlier albums. In 1995, Melissa Etheridge earned a RIAA certification of 2× platinum, while Never Enough earned a RIAA certification of platinum.

Etheridge's follow-up to Yes I Am was the successful Your Little Secret (1995). The album was not as well received by critics as Etheridge's prior recordings. Featuring a lead single of the same name, Your Little Secret is the highest-charting album of Etheridge's career, having reached No. 6 on the Billboard album charts; however, the album spent only 41 weeks on the chart. The album produced two Top 40 singles--"I Want to Come Over" (Billboard No. 22, RPM No. 1) and "Nowhere to Go" (Billboard No. 40)--and earned a RIAA certification of 2× platinum.

=== 1996–2003: After her breakthrough ===
In 1996, Etheridge won an ASCAP Songwriter of the Year award. She also took a lengthy break from the music business to concentrate on her family when her first two children Bailey (1997) and Beckett (1998) were born. She also recorded "Sin Tener A Donde Ir (Nowhere to Go)" for the AIDS benefit album Silencio=Muerte: Red Hot + Latin produced by the Red Hot Organization.

Etheridge returned to the music charts with the release of Breakdown in October 1999. Breakdown peaked at No. 12 on the Billboard charts and spent 18 weeks in the charts. Despite this, Breakdown was the only album of Etheridge's career to be nominated for a Grammy Award for Best Rock Album (losing to Santana's Supernatural). In addition, her single "Angels Would Fall" was nominated in two categories: Best Rock Vocal Performance, Female (losing to Sheryl Crow) and Best Rock Song (losing to the Red Hot Chili Peppers) in 2000. A year later, another single from the album—"Enough of Me"—was nominated for Best Rock Vocal Performance, Female (also losing to Sheryl Crow). The album was certified gold by the RIAA.

The year 2001 saw the release of Skin, an album she described as "the closest I've ever come to recording a concept album. It has a beginning, middle and end. It's a journey." Skin garnered generally positive reviews with Metacritic scoring the album 73/100 from 9 reviews. Recorded after her breakup with partner Julie Cypher, Skin was described as "[a] harrowing, clearly autobiographical dissection of a decaying relationship." Despite positive reviews, Skin sold less than 500,000 copies. On the Billboard charts, it peaked at No. 9 but dropped out of the Top 200 after just 12 weeks. The single "I Want to Be in Love" was nominated for the Best Rock Vocal Performance, Female (losing to Lucinda Williams). The music video for the song starred Jennifer Aniston.

In 2002, Etheridge released an autobiography entitled The Truth Is: My Life in Love and Music.

=== 2004–2008: Lucky, cancer diagnosis, Academy Awards and The Awakening ===
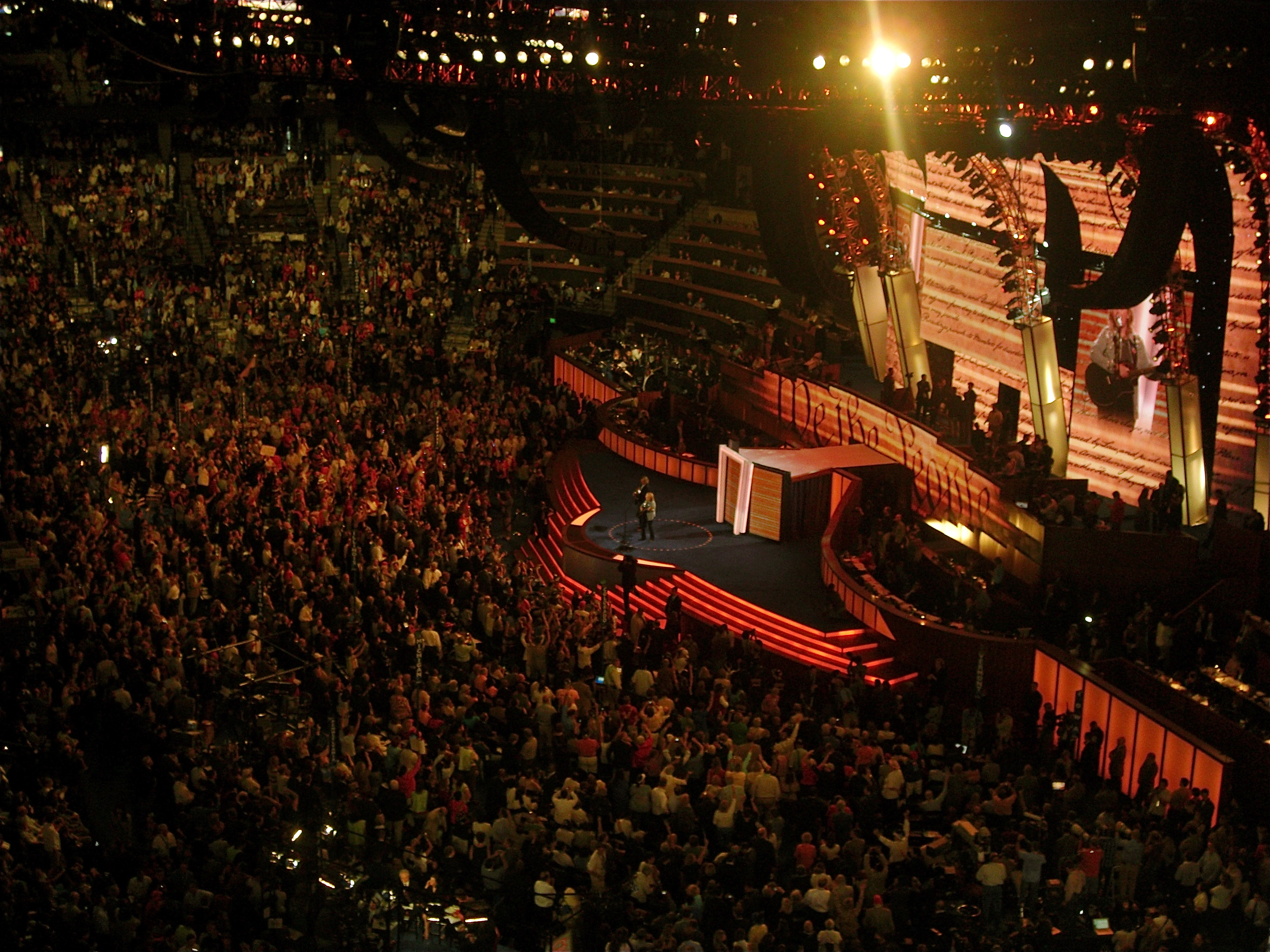
Etheridge performs during the third night of the 2008 Democratic National Convention in Denver, Colorado

Etheridge began 2004 with the release of her eighth album Lucky on February 10. Etheridge was now in a new relationship with actress Tammy Lynn Michaels, whom she had begun dating in 2001. Lucky performed similarly to Skin, selling fewer than 500,000 copies, peaking on the Billboard charts at No. 15 and spending 13 weeks on the charts. It also garnered a Grammy nomination for Etheridge's cover of the Greenwheel song "Breathe" for the Grammy Award for Best Rock Vocal Performance, Solo (losing to Bruce Springsteen).

In October 2004, Etheridge was diagnosed with breast cancer. At the 2005 Grammy Awards (the same ceremony for which "Breathe" was nominated), she made a return to the stage and, although bald from chemotherapy, performed a tribute to Janis Joplin with the song "Piece of My Heart". Etheridge's performance was lauded in song in India.Arie's "I Am Not My Hair".

On September 10, 2005, Etheridge participated in ReAct Now: Music & Relief, a telethon in support for the victims of Hurricane Katrina. ReAct Now, part of an ongoing effort by MTV, VH1, CMT, seeks to raise funds for the American Red Cross, the Salvation Army, and America's Second Harvest. Etheridge introduced a new song specially written for the occasion called "Four Days". The a cappella song included themes and images that were on the news during the aftermath of the hurricane. Other charities she supports include The Dream Foundation and Love Our Children USA.

In November 2005, Etheridge appeared on The Tonight Show with Jay Leno to perform her song "I Run for Life".

Etheridge wrote "I Need to Wake Up" for the film documentary An Inconvenient Truth, which won the Oscar for Best Original Song in 2006. The song was released only on the enhanced version of her greatest hits album, The Road Less Traveled.

Etheridge was also a judge for the 5th annual Independent Music Awards to support independent artists' careers.

In August 2006, Etheridge also produced and sang the vocal tracks on the Brother Bear 2 soundtrack, including collaborations with Josh Kelley.

On July 7, 2007, Etheridge performed at the Giants Stadium on the American leg of Live Earth. Etheridge performed the songs "Imagine That" and "What Happens Tomorrow" from The Awakening, her tenth album, released on September 25, 2007, as well as the song "I Need To Wake Up" before introducing Al Gore. On December 11, 2007, she performed at the Nobel Peace Prize Concert in Oslo, Norway, together with a variety of artists, a concert which was broadcast live to over 100 countries. In addition, she performed at the U.S. 2008 Democratic National Convention on August 27, 2008.

=== 2009–2015: Fearless Love, 4th Street Feeling, and This Is M.E. ===
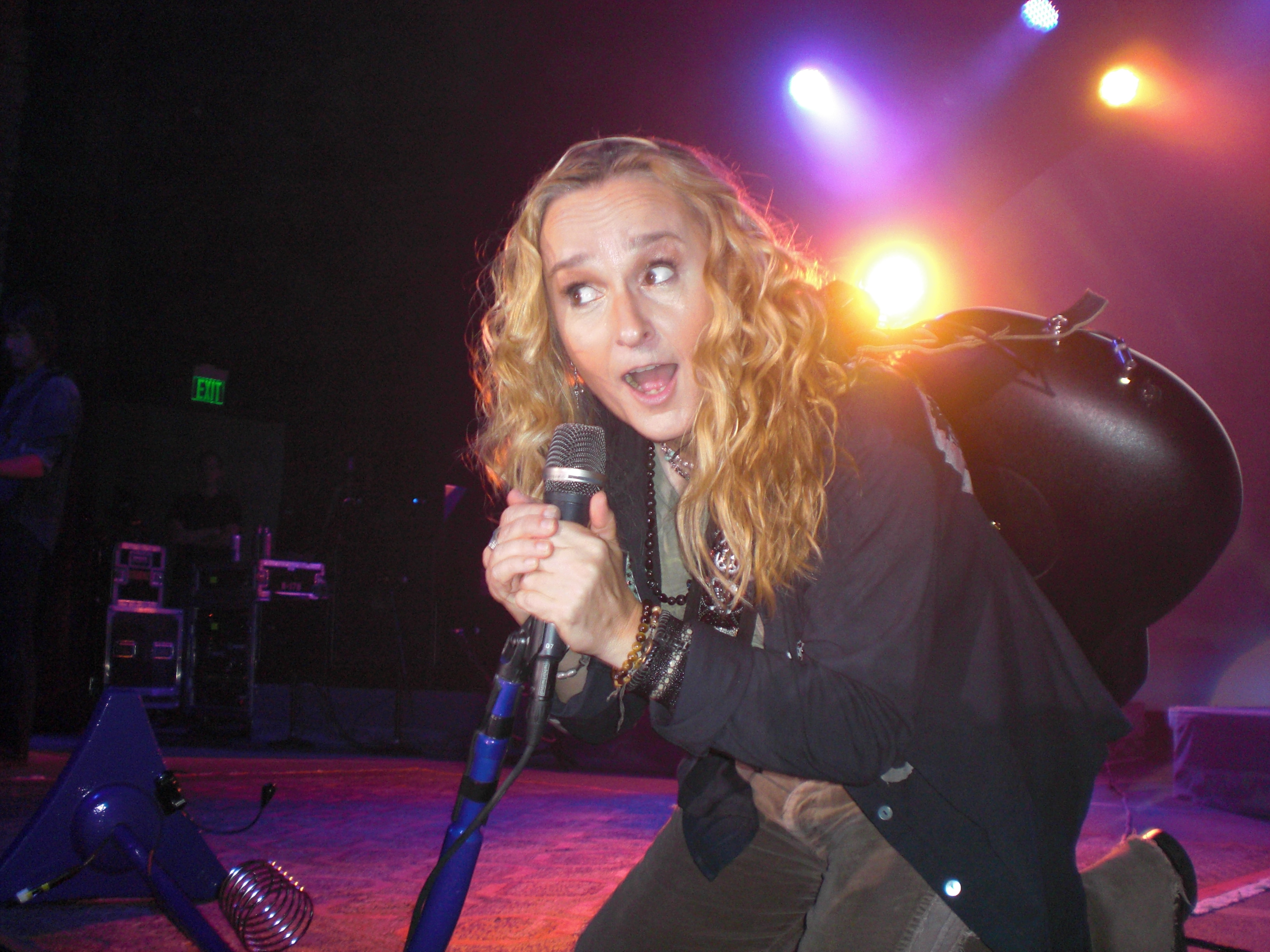
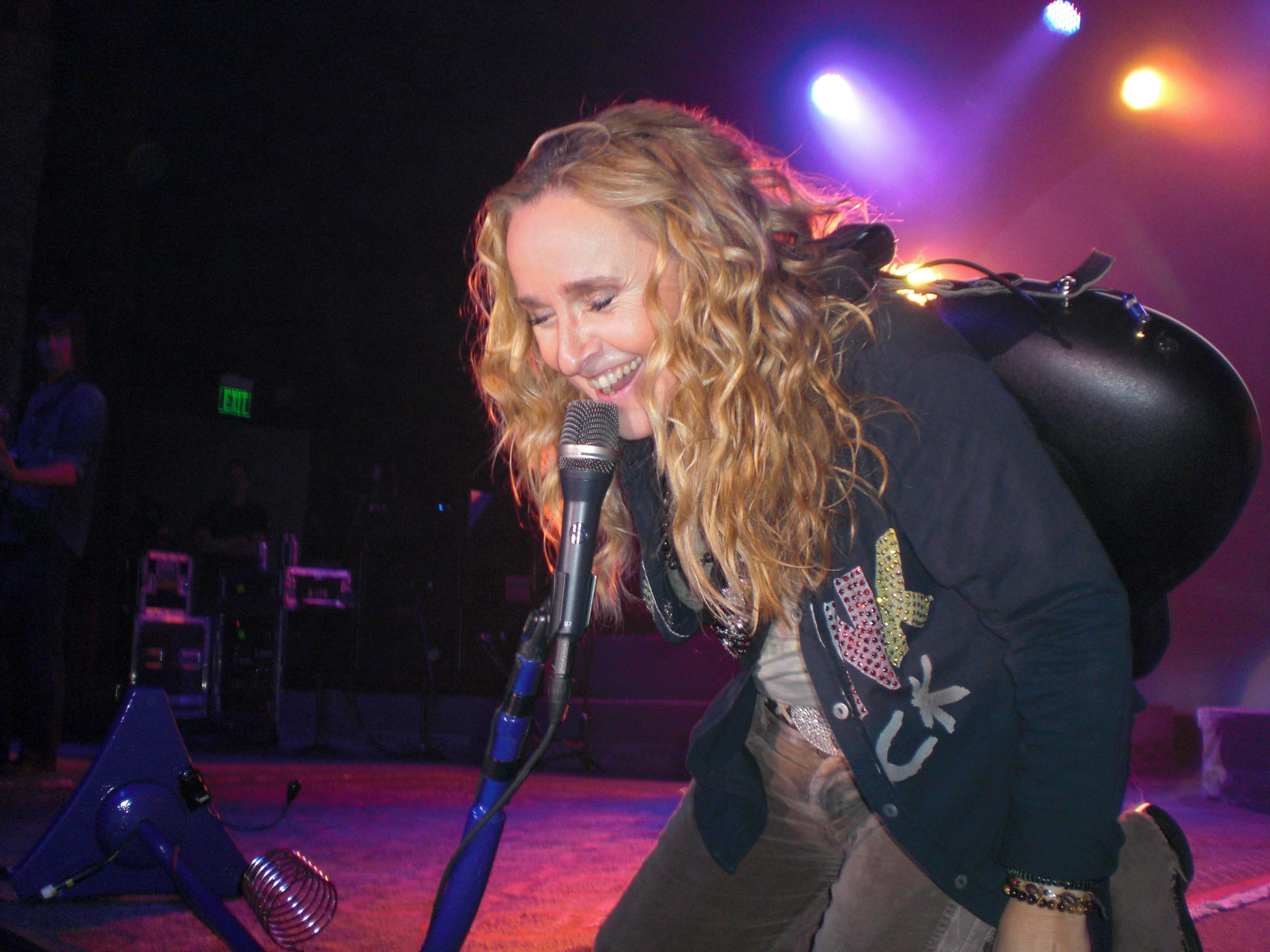
Etheridge performing live. Spirit Mountain, August 2010

Etheridge was featured in UniGlobe Entertainment's breast cancer docudrama titled 1 a Minute released in 2010.

Etheridge performed the role of St. Jimmy in Green Day's hit Broadway musical, American Idiot, from February 1–6, 2011.

Etheridge performed her new song "Uprising of Love" in the 2013–2014 New Year's Eve celebration in New York City's Times Square along with the rendition of John Lennon's "Imagine" before the ball drop. The single was released on iTunes on January 28, 2014.

In 2014, she was one of the performers at the opening ceremonies of WorldPride in Toronto, Ontario, Canada, alongside Tom Robinson, Deborah Cox and Steve Grand.

On July 1, 2014, she released "Take My Number", the first single from her thirteenth studio album This Is M.E.. The cover art for the album is a mosaic that includes pictures submitted by fans. Etheridge explains the album cover on her official website: "Because my fans are such a huge part of ME, and I wouldn't be ME without YOU, I took photos submitted by my fans and turned it into my album cover." The album was released on September 30, 2014.

On June 9, 2015, she released a live album titled: A Little Bit of Me: Live in L.A.. It was recorded at the closing show of the U.S. leg of her This Is M.E. Tour on December 12, 2014, at the Orpheum Theater in downtown Los Angeles.

=== 2016–present: MEmphis Rock and Soul, The Medicine Show, One Way Out, and Rise ===
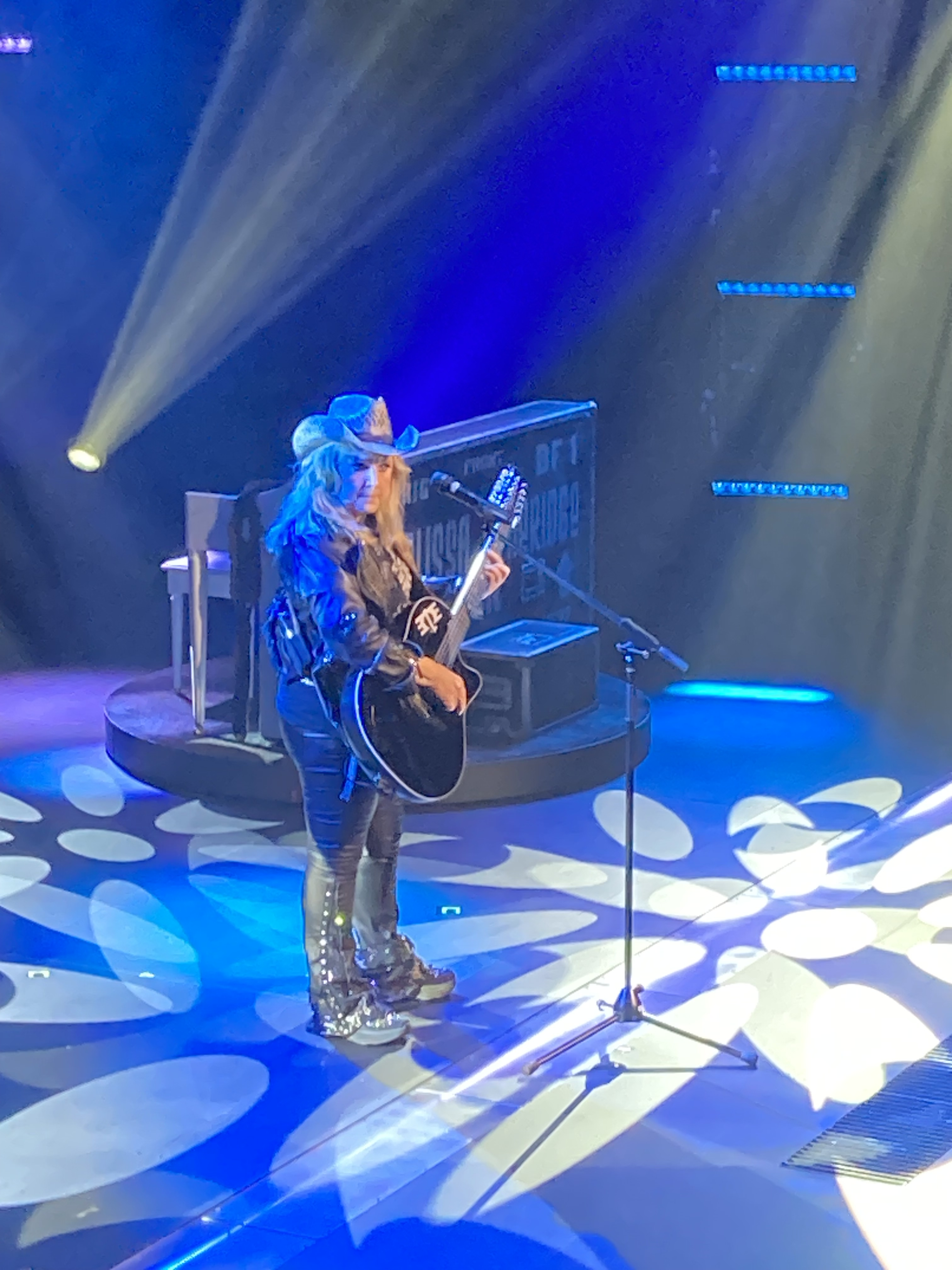
Etheridge performing live on Broadway, October 10, 2023

On October 6, 2016, Etheridge released her fourteenth studio album, MEmphis Rock and Soul, a covers album made of blues tracks originally recorded by blues legends such as Otis Redding, William Bell, and the Staples Singers.

On April 12, 2019, Etheridge released her fifteenth studio album, The Medicine Show. The first single released from the album was titled "Faded by Design".

On September 17, 2021, Etheridge released a new album, One Way Out, on BMG. The album is composed of songs written in the late 1980s and early 1990s, but recorded recently with her original band, although the last two songs were recorded live at the Roxy in Los Angeles in 2002.

In March 2022, Etheridge was announced as a strategic advisor for the Inpink platform by Gritty In Pink alongside Arlan Hamilton and Live Nation.

In September 2023, Etheridge premiered her one-woman show, Melissa Etheridge: My Window, at Circle in the Square Theatre in New York City.

Etheridge released her seventeenth studio album, Rise, on March 27, 2026.

== Etheridge Foundation ==
Following the 2020 death of her son, Etheridge launched the Etheridge Foundation. Through this charity, she advocates for, and funds research into alternative therapies of plant-based medicines and psychedelics to revolutionize addiction treatment. The foundation has raised more than $1 million by 2026 and continues to raise awareness for opioid use disorder recovery.

For her "Raised On Radio" co-headlining tour with Wynonna Judd, in August 2026, a portion from every ticket sold will be donated to the Etheridge Foundation, and another portion to St. Jude Children's Research Hospital. It has also been confirmed that a share of the profits of her performance at "The RISE Tour" to the Coronado Performing Arts Center in Rockford, Illinois, in September 2026, will go to charitable benefit of the Etheridge Foundation.

== Personal life ==
Etheridge came out publicly as a lesbian in January 1993 at the Triangle Ball, a homosexual-themed celebration of President Bill Clinton's first inauguration. Etheridge supported Clinton's 1992 presidential campaign and since coming out, has been a gay rights activist. She is also an advocate for environmental issues and in 2006, she toured the US and Canada using biodiesel.

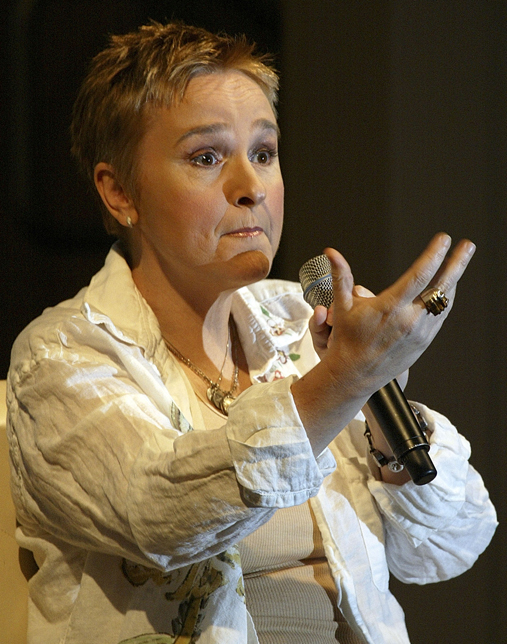
Etheridge speaking in 2005

Etheridge had a long-term partnership with Julie Cypher, and their relationship received coverage in The Advocate, when an interview with editor Judy Wieder done in Amsterdam, "The Great Dyke Hope", was released in July 1994. In it, Etheridge answered Wieder's questions about why the couple wanted to have children: "I think one of the many fears people have about homosexuality is around children. I think that the more gay parents raise good, strong, compassionate people, the better the world will be." During this partnership, Cypher gave birth to two children, Bailey Jean and Beckett. Cypher became pregnant via artificial insemination using sperm donated by musician David Crosby. On September 19, 2000, Etheridge and Cypher announced they were separating.

In 2002, Etheridge began dating actress Tammy Lynn Michaels. The two had a commitment ceremony on September 20, 2003. On October 17, 2006, Michaels gave birth to fraternal twins, Johnnie Rose and Miller Steven, who were conceived via an anonymous sperm donor.

In October 2004, Etheridge was diagnosed with breast cancer. She underwent surgery and chemotherapy. In October 2005, in honor of Breast Cancer Awareness Month, Etheridge appeared on Dateline NBC with Michaels to discuss her struggle with cancer. By the time of the interview, Etheridge's hair had grown back after being lost during chemotherapy. She said that her partner had been very supportive during her illness. Etheridge also discussed using medicinal marijuana while she was receiving the chemotherapy.

In October 2008, five months after the Supreme Court of California overturned the state's ban on same-sex marriage, Etheridge announced that she and Michaels were planning to marry but were currently "trying to find the right time... to go down and do it". In November 2008, in response to the passing of California's Proposition 8 banning same-sex marriage, Etheridge announced that she would not pay her state taxes as an act of civil disobedience. On April 15, 2010, Etheridge and Michaels announced they had separated. In May 2012, it was announced that their two-year child support battle had been settled.

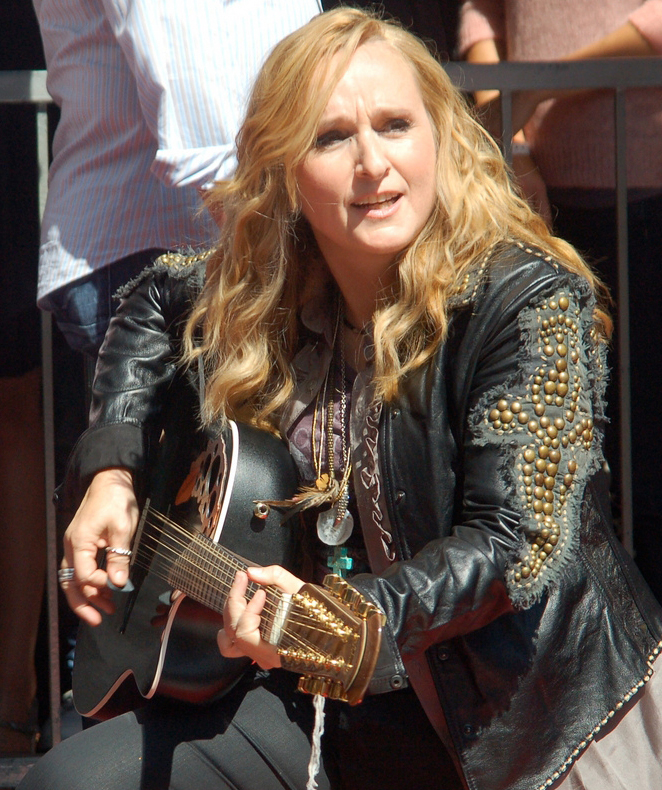
Etheridge performing at a September 2011 ceremony where she received a star on the Hollywood Walk of Fame

Etheridge supported Barack Obama's decision to have Pastor Rick Warren speak at his 2009 Presidential inauguration, believing that he can sponsor dialogue to bridge the gap between gay and straight Christians. She stated in her column at HuffPost that "Sure, there are plenty of hateful people who will always hold on to their bigotry like a child to a blanket. But there are also good people out there, Christian and otherwise, that are beginning to listen."

In 2013, Etheridge called Angelina Jolie's choice to have a double mastectomy to avoid the possibility of breast cancer a "fearful" choice. Etheridge told the Washington Blade in an interview that "my belief is that cancer comes from inside you and so much of it has to do with the environment of your body...It's the stress that will turn that gene on or not...I really encourage people to go a lot longer and further before coming to that conclusion." Andrea Geduld, the director of the Breast Health Resource Center at Mt. Sinai Hospital, criticized Etheridge's remarks. Experts also cautioned that Etheridge's statements were not accurate.

In a 2013 interview with CNN after the U.S. Supreme Court's decisions in United States v. Windsor and Hollingsworth v. Perry, Etheridge stated that she planned to marry her partner, Linda Wallem. The couple married on May 31, 2014, in San Ysidro Ranch in Montecito, California, two days after they both turned 53.

Etheridge was featured on a 2015 episode of Who Do You Think You Are?

Starting in 2014, Etheridge partnered with a California medical marijuana dispensary to make cannabis-infused wine.

A 2016 article in The New York Times stated that Etheridge wore hearing aids.

In 2019, her daughter, Bailey Cypher, graduated from Columbia University.

On May 13, 2020, Etheridge announced on her Twitter that Beckett, her son with Cypher, had died of causes related to opioid addiction at the age of 21. She wrote the song "Call You", which appears on her 2026 album Rise, as a way to process her grief around his death and attributed it with helping her find a new outlook on life in the wake of his passing.

== Awards and honors ==
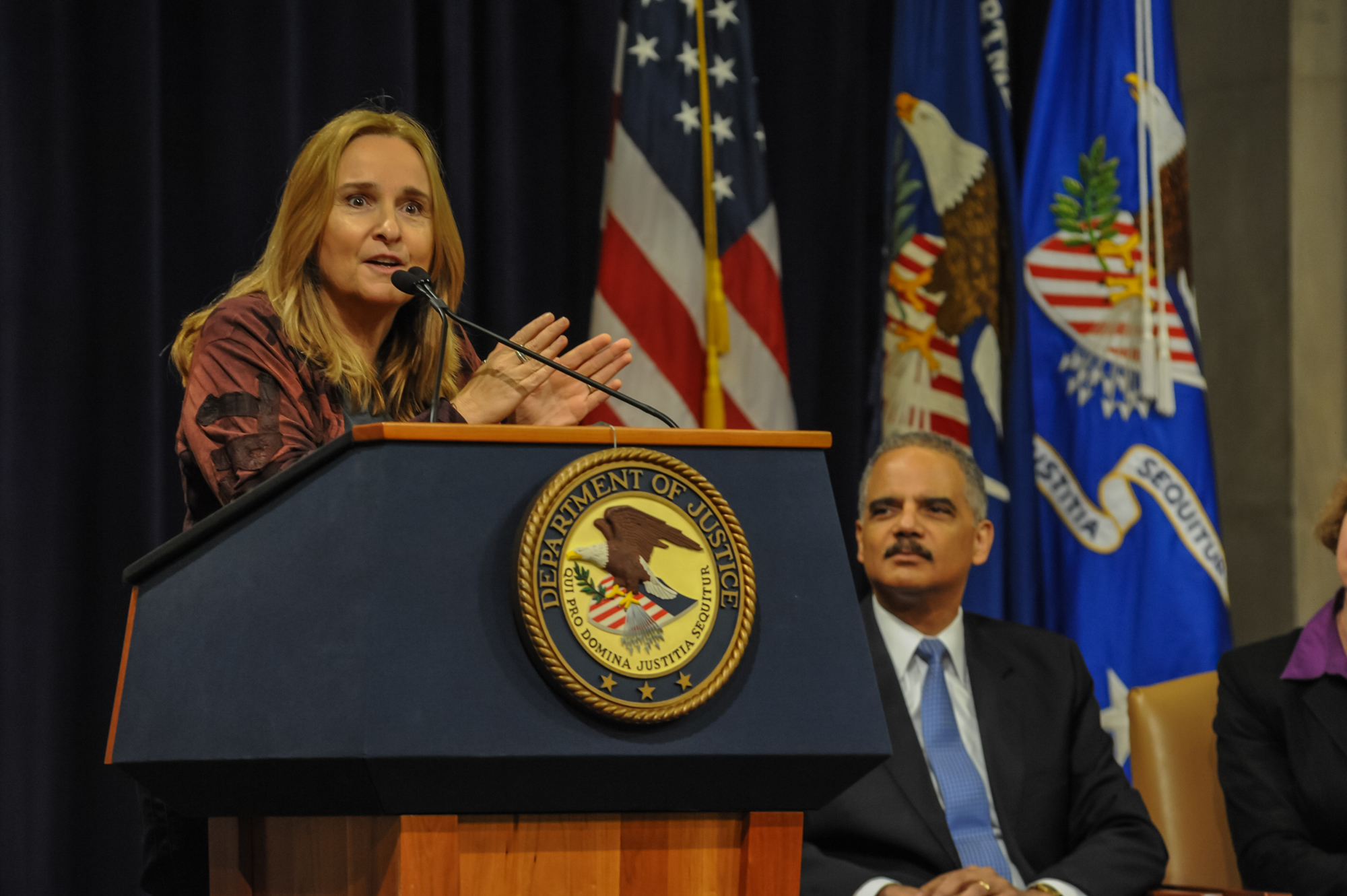
Etheridge shared her personal experiences of advocating for the LGBTQ community at a United States Department of Justice Event in 2013

Etheridge has received various accolades and honors throughout her career. Among her competitive awards, she has won two Grammy Awards (from 15 nominations), an Academy Award, and a Juno Award.

Among her honorary accolades, she has received the ASCAP Founders Award, an Honorary Doctor of Music Degree from Berklee College of Music, and a star on the Hollywood Walk of Fame.

She ranked No. 49 on VH1's list of 100 Greatest Women in Rock & Roll in 1999.

In 2026, Etheridge was nominated for the Rock and Roll Hall of Fame.

== Discography ==
- Melissa Etheridge (1988)
- Brave and Crazy (1989)
- Never Enough (1992)
- Yes I Am (1993)
- Your Little Secret (1995)
- Breakdown (1999)
- Skin (2001)
- Lucky (2004)
- The Awakening (2007)
- A New Thought For Christmas (2008)
- Fearless Love (2010)
- 4th Street Feeling (2012)
- This Is M.E. (2014)
- MEmphis Rock and Soul (2016)
- The Medicine Show (2019)
- One Way Out (2021)
- Rise (2026)

== Published works ==
- Etheridge, Melissa; Morton, Laura (2002) [2001]. The Truth Is...: My Life in Love and Music (Trade paperback ed.). New York: Random House. ISBN 978-0-307-76564-2. OCLC 49971087. First autobiography.
- Etheridge, Melissa (2023). Talking to My Angels. New York: Harper Wave. ISBN 9780063257450. OCLC 1381904417.

== See also ==
- List of celebrities who own cannabis businesses
