= The Wallflowers discography =

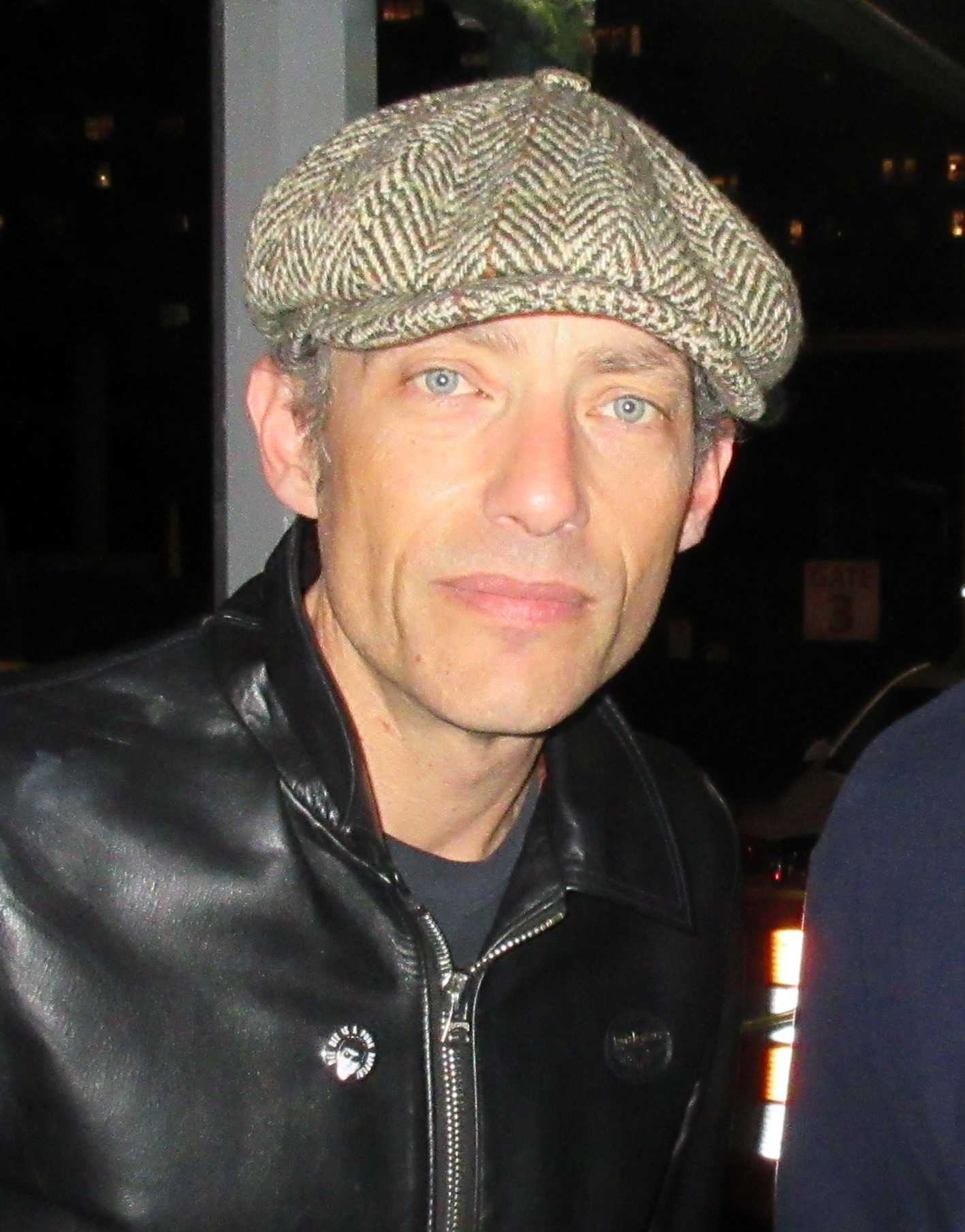
- Jakob Dylan, founder and lead singer of The Wallflowers in May 2019
- Studio albums: 7
- Soundtrack albums: 10
- Compilation albums: 3
- Singles: 17
- Music videos: 12

The following is a comprehensive discography of recordings by the Wallflowers, an American alternative rock band originally from Los Angeles.

== Albums ==
=== Studio albums ===
Year	Album details	Peak chart positions										Certifications (sales threshold)
Year	Album details	US	US Heat	AUS	CAN	ITA	NZ	SWE	SWI	GER	UK	Certifications (sales threshold)
The Wallflowers	Release date: August 25, 1992; Label: Virgin; Formats: CD, cassette	—	—	154	—	—	—	—	—	—	—	
Bringing Down the Horse	Release date: May 21, 1996; Label: Interscope; Formats: CD, cassette, vinyl (reissue), digital	4	1	9	6	—	1	12	—	—	58	RIAA: 4× Platinum; ARIA: Gold; MC: 6× Platinum; RMNZ: Platinum
(Breach)	Release date: October 10, 2000; Label: Interscope; Formats: CD, cassette, vinyl, digital	13	—	105	9	48	50	35	48	88	161	RIAA: Gold; MC: Gold
Red Letter Days	Release date: November 5, 2002; Label: Interscope; Formats: CD, SACD, vinyl, digital	32	—	—	—	—	—	—	—	—	—	
Rebel, Sweetheart	Release date: May 24, 2005; Label: Interscope; Formats: CD, DualDisc CD/DVD, digital	40	—	—	—	81	—	—	—	—	—	
Glad All Over	Release date: October 9, 2012; Label: Columbia; Formats: CD, vinyl, digital	48	—	—	—	—	—	—	—	—	—	
Exit Wounds	Release date: July 9, 2021; Label: New West; Formats: CD, vinyl, digital	183	—	—	—	—	—	—	29	90	—	
"—" denotes releases that did not chart or was not released in that territory.

=== Compilation albums ===
Title	Album details	Peak chart positions
Title	Album details	US
iTunes Originals: The Wallflowers	Released: May 24, 2005; Label: Interscope; Formats: Digital	—
Collected: 1996–2005	Released: June 16, 2009; Label: Interscope; Formats: CD, CD+DVD, digital	137
Looking Through You: Another Collection	Release date: 2010; Label: Interscope	—
"—" denotes releases that did not chart or was not released in that territory.

== Singles ==
Title	Year	Peak chart positions										Certifications	Album
Title	Year	US	US Main.	US Mod.	US Adult	US AAA	AUS	CAN	GER	ICE	UK	Certifications	Album
"Ashes to Ashes"	1992	—	—	—	—	—	156	—	—	—	—		The Wallflowers
"Shy of the Moon"	1992	—	—	—	—	—	—	—	—	—	—		The Wallflowers
"6th Avenue Heartache"	1996	33^{[A]}	10	8	26	2	162	8	—	—	—		Bringing Down the Horse
"One Headlight"	1997	2^{[A]}	1	1	1	1	14	1	88	29	54	ARIA: Gold	Bringing Down the Horse
"The Difference"	1997	23^{[A]}	3	5	14	2	161	12	—	—	—		Bringing Down the Horse
"Three Marlenas"	1997	51^{[A]}	21	17	27	1	—	13	—	—	111		Bringing Down the Horse
"Heroes"	1998	27^{[A]}	4	9	20	3	38	13	85	21	—		Godzilla: The Album
"Sleepwalker"	2000	73	26	31	21	1	—	6	—	—	—		(Breach)
"Letters from the Wasteland"	2001	—	—	—	38	7	—	—	—	—	—		(Breach)
"When You're on Top"	2002	—	—	—	33	1	—	—	—	—	—		Red Letter Days
"Closer to You"	2002	—	—	—	—	9	—	—	—	—	—		Red Letter Days
"How Good It Can Get"	2002	—	—	—	—	2	—	—	—	—	—		Red Letter Days
"The Beautiful Side of Somewhere"	2005	—	—	—	—	4	—	—	—	—	—		Rebel, Sweetheart
"God Says Nothing Back"	2005	—	—	—	—	19	—	—	—	—	—		Rebel, Sweetheart
"Reboot the Mission"	2012	—	—	—	—	2	—	—	—	—	—		Glad All Over
"Love Is a Country"	2013	—	—	—	—	11	—	—	—	—	—		Glad All Over
"Roots and Wings"	2021	—	—	—	—	6	—	—	—	—	—		Exit Wounds
"—" denotes releases that did not chart or was not released in that territory.

- A. Charted only on the Hot 100 Airplay chart.

== Soundtracks ==
The Wallflowers have had numerous original and cover songs featured in television and movie soundtracks:

Song	Original artist	Soundtrack
"Heroes"	David Bowie	Godzilla (also in NHL 99)
"I Started a Joke"	Bee Gees	Zoolander
"I'm Looking Through You"	The Beatles	I Am Sam
"Into the Mystic"	Van Morrison	American Wedding
"Here Comes Now" (produced by Steve Lillywhite)	Jakob Dylan	Six Degrees
"Stardust Universe"	Jakob Dylan	Jericho
"Everybody Out of the Water"	The Wallflowers	CSI: Crime Scene Investigation
"Empire in My Mind"	The Wallflowers	The Guardian
"No Matter What"	Jakob Dylan	NCIS
"One Headlight"	The Wallflowers	Cold Case (Episode Only)

== Other appearances ==
- "One Headlight" (on Excess Baggage, 1997)
- "Angel on My Bike" (on KCRW Rare on Air, Vol. 3, 1997)
- "Used to Be Lucky" (on No Boundaries: A Benefit for the Kosovar Refugees, 1999)
- "Too Late for Goodbyes" (on Trampoline Records Greatest Hits, Vol. II, 2003)
- "Lawyers, Guns, and Money" (on Enjoy Every Sandwich: The Songs of Warren Zevon, 2004)
- "Gimme Some Truth" written by John Lennon. Jakob Dylan and Dhani Harrison (on Instant Karma: The Amnesty International Campaign to Save Darfur, 2007)

== Music videos ==
Year	Song	Director(s)
1993	"Be Your Own Girl"	Paula Greif
1996	"6th Avenue Heartache"	David Fincher
1996	"One Headlight"	Ken Fox
1997	"The Difference"	Ken Fox
1997	"Three Marlenas"	Big TV!
1998	"Heroes"	Dom & Nic
2000	"Sleepwalker"	Mark Romanek
2001	"Letters From the Wasteland"	Liz Friedlander
2002	"When You're On Top"	Marc Webb
2005	"The Beautiful Side of Somewhere"	Jon Watts
2012	"Reboot the Mission"	Sam Jones
2013	"Love Is a Country"	Jesse Dylan
