= Collected: 1996–2005 =

Compilation album by the Wallflowers
- Released: June 16, 2009
- Genre: Roots rock; alternative rock
- Length: 70:37
- Label: Interscope
- Producer: T Bone Burnett, Andrew Slater & Michael Penn, Tobias Miller & Bill Appleberry, Brendan O'Brien, Julian Raymond

The Wallflowers chronology
Rebel, Sweetheart (2005)	Collected: 1996–2005 (2009)	Glad All Over (2012)

Collected 1996–2005 is a greatest hits / best of compilation by American rock band the Wallflowers. It was released on June 16, 2009, by Interscope Records. It includes all the singles from their four albums on the label, Bringing Down the Horse (1996), Breach (2000), Red Letter Days (2002), and Rebel, Sweetheart (2005). In addition to singles and selected album tracks, the compilation includes two previously unreleased recordings, "Eat You Sleeping" and a demo version of "God Says Nothing Back". The album cover artwork was previously used for the novel Samaritan by Richard Price.

== Track listing ==
All tracks are written by Jakob Dylan.

Collected: 1996–2005 track listing
No.	Title	Album	Length
1.	"One Headlight"	Bringing Down the Horse, 1996	5:16
2.	"6th Avenue Heartache"	Bringing Down the Horse, 1996	5:40
3.	"Three Marlenas"	Bringing Down the Horse, 1996	5:00
4.	"The Difference"	Bringing Down the Horse, 1996	3:50
5.	"Invisible City"	Bringing Down the Horse, 1996	4:50
6.	"Letters from the Wasteland"	Breach, 2000	4:32
7.	"Hand Me Down"	Breach, 2000	3:40
8.	"Sleepwalker"	Breach, 2000	3:32
9.	"I've Been Delivered"	Breach, 2000	5:01
10.	"When You're on Top"	Red Letter Days, 2002	3:56
11.	"How Good It Can Get"	Red Letter Days, 2002	4:13
12.	"Closer to You"	Red Letter Days, 2002	3:17
13.	"The Beautiful Side of Somewhere"	Rebel, Sweetheart, 2005	4:01
14.	"God Says Nothing Back"	Rebel, Sweetheart, 2005	4:47
15.	"Eat You Sleeping"	previously unreleased	4:15
16.	"God Says Nothing Back" (Demo Version)	previously unreleased	4:32
Total length:			70:00

=== Best Buy Exclusive ===
Best Buy carried an exclusive two-disc version of the compilation. In addition to the audio CD, a DVD was also included and featured all eight music videos from this time period:

All tracks are written by Jakob Dylan.

Bonus DVD – music videos
No.	Title	Director	Length
1.	"6th Avenue Heartache" (1996)	David Fincher	4:27
2.	"One Headlight" (1996)	Ken Fox	4:39
3.	"The Difference" (1996)	Ken Fox	3:54
4.	"Three Marlenas" (1997)	Big TV	4:42
5.	"Sleepwalker" (2000)	Mark Romanek	3:37
6.	"Letters from the Wasteland" (2001)	Liz Friedlander	4:16
7.	"When You're On Top" (2002)	Marc Webb	3:55
8.	"The Beautiful Side of Somewhere" (2005)	Jon Watts	4:04
Total length:			32:00

== Personnel ==
=== The Wallflowers ===
- Jakob Dylan – lead vocals, rhythm guitar
- Rami Jaffee – Hammond B3 organ, backing vocals, keyboards, piano
- Greg Richling – bass guitar, background vocals
- Michael Ward – lead guitar, backing vocals
- Mario Calire – drums

=== Additional musicians ===
- Jay Joyce
- Fred Tackett
- Tom Lord-Alge – engineering, mixing
- Jon Brion
- T-Bone Burnett – production
- Mike Campbell – slide guitar
- Matt Chamberlain – all drums (Tracks 1–5)
- Adam Duritz
- Don Heffington
- Leo LeBlanc
- Gary Louris
- Tobi Miller
- Michael Penn
- Sam Phillips
- David Rawlings
- Patrick Warren
- Lenny Castro – additional percussion
- Val Mccallum – guitar
- Ben Peeler – slide guitar

=== Additional credits ===
- Photo Coordinator: Ryan Null
- Photography: Ken Schles
- Digitally Remastered by: Gavin Lurssen
- Mastering Assistant: Danc C. Smart

== Charts ==
Chart (2009)	Peak position
US Billboard 200	137
US Top Rock Albums (Billboard)	49
