= Down Where the Spirit Meets the Bone =

Studio album by Lucinda Williams
- Released: September 30, 2014
- Recorded: 2014
- Genre: Americana, folk rock, alternative country, heartland rock
- Length: 103:05
- Label: Highway 20 Records
- Producer: Greg Leisz, Tom Overby, Lucinda Williams

Lucinda Williams chronology
Blessed (2011)	Down Where the Spirit Meets the Bone (2014)	The Ghosts of Highway 20 (2016)

Down Where the Spirit Meets the Bone is the 11th studio album by American singer-songwriter Lucinda Williams. The double album was released on September 30, 2014. It is the first album on Williams' own Highway 20 Records label. The song "Compassion", from which the album title is derived, is based on a poem by her father, Miller Williams.

The album won the Americana Music Award for Album of the Year in 2015, while the track "East Side of Town" was nominated for Song of the Year. In 2017, the song "When I Look at the World" was covered by Kaitlin Doubleday as her character Jessie Caine on season five of the TV series Nashville.

== Reception ==
Professional ratings
Aggregate scores
Source	Rating
AnyDecentMusic?	8.0/10
Metacritic	83/100
Review scores
Source	Rating
AllMusic	4/5 stars
Chicago Tribune	3.5/4 stars
Cuepoint (Expert Witness)	B+
The Daily Telegraph	4/5 stars
The Independent	5/5 stars
The Irish Times	4/5 stars
Mojo	4/5 stars
Q	4/5 stars
Record Collector	3/5 stars
Uncut	8/10

=== Critical ===
The album received acclaim from music critics. At Metacritic, which assigns a normalized rating out of 100 to reviews from mainstream critics, the album received an average score of 83 based on 19 reviews, which indicates "universal acclaim". "[T]hough this doesn't always sound like an album where Williams is challenging herself musically, for a musician who has long believed in the power of nuance, this is an album that feels unerringly right for her, full of sweet and sour blues, acoustic pondering, and simple, bare bones rock & roll that slips into the groove with Williams' literate but unpretentious songs," writes Mark Deming at AllMusic. The New York Times says, "On past albums Ms. Williams has portrayed herself at moments of rage, excess and grief; now she prefers stability. Her songs are fully aware of wounds and pitfalls, but they’re more likely to be looking back or looking outward." Tom Moon writes at NPR, "She's always been able to conjure brokenhearted misery from a single note; now, she can ramp up to fury that quickly, too. And resignation. And let's face it: In terms of pure expression, no singer in popular music can touch Williams when she's calling from the lonely outskirts of Despairville. She sounds like it's her permanent residence, that place down deep where the spirit meets the bone."

=== Commercial ===
The album debuted on the Billboard 200 at No. 13 on its release. It also debuted at No. 1 on the Folk Albums and No. 2 on the Top Rock Albums charts, with 20,000 copies sold for the week. The album has sold 92,000 copies in the US as of January 2016.

== Guest appearances ==
Guest appearances on the album include harmony vocals by Jakob Dylan on the song "It's Gonna Rain", guitar by Tony Joe White on two songs, and keyboards by Ian McLagan on five songs. Elvis Costello's backing group plays on a few songs with Stuart Mathis of The Wallflowers. Bill Frisell plays guitar on two songs.

== Track listing ==
All songs written by Lucinda Williams, except where noted.

Disc one
No.	Title	Writer(s)	Length
1.	"Compassion"	Miller Williams, music and additional words by Lucinda Williams	2:57
2.	"Protection"		4:47
3.	"Burning Bridges"		4:49
4.	"East Side of Town"		4:56
5.	"West Memphis"		5:44
6.	"Cold Day in Hell"		5:16
7.	"Foolishness"		5:57
8.	"Wrong Number"		5:01
9.	"Stand Right by Each Other"		3:58
10.	"It's Gonna Rain"		4:18
Total length:			47:48

Disc two
No.	Title	Writer(s)	Length
1.	"Something Wicked This Way Comes"		5:45
2.	"Big Mess"		5:32
3.	"When I Look at the World"		4:56
4.	"Walk On"		4:11
5.	"Temporary Nature (Of Any Precious Thing)"		5:05
6.	"Everything But the Truth"		5:11
7.	"This Old Heartache"		5:03
8.	"Stowaway in Your Heart"		3:27
9.	"One More Day"		6:21
10.	"Magnolia"	JJ Cale	9:51
Total length:			55:27

== Personnel ==
- Lucinda Williams – vocals, acoustic guitar
- Tony Joe White – electric guitar, harmonica
- Greg Leisz – acoustic and electric guitars, lap steel guitar, backing vocals
- Val McCallum – electric guitar
- Stuart Mathis – electric guitar
- Jonathan Wilson – guitar
- Patrick Warren – chamberlin, organ, piano, pump organ, autoharp, keyboards
- Ian "Mac" McLagan – Wurlitzer, piano
- Davey Faragher – bass
- Pete Thomas – drums and percussion
- Gia Ciambotti – backing vocals
- Doug Pettibone – electric guitar, backing vocals

Additional musicians:

- Jakob Dylan – harmony vocals
- Bill Frisell – electric guitar
- Bob Glaub – bass
- Sebastian Steinberg – bass
- David Sutton – bass
- David Ralicke – saxophone, euphonium
- Jordan Katz – trumpet
- Butch Norton – drums

== Charts ==
Chart performance for Down Where the Spirit Meets the Bone
Chart (2014)	Peak position
Australian Albums (ARIA)	32
Belgian Albums (Ultratop Flanders)	45
Belgian Albums (Ultratop Wallonia)	129
Danish Albums (Hitlisten)	11
Dutch Albums (Album Top 100)	31
German Albums (Offizielle Top 100)	77
Irish Albums (IRMA)	31
Norwegian Albums (VG-lista)	20
Scottish Albums (OCC)	16
Swedish Albums (Sverigetopplistan)	58
Swiss Albums (Schweizer Hitparade)	94
UK Albums (OCC)	23
UK Americana Albums (OCC)	28
UK Independent Albums (OCC)	4
US Billboard 200	13
US Americana/Folk Albums (Billboard)	1
US Independent Albums (Billboard)	1
US Top Rock Albums (Billboard)	2
