= Jamie Caliri =

American director, born 1970

Jamie Caliri (born February 22, 1970, in Buffalo, New York) is an American director, known primarily for music videos, television commercials and title sequences.

Between 1988 and 1992, he studied film, design, and animation at the California Institute of the Arts. He is also a self-taught still photographer.

He has been signed to production companies Acme Filmworks (ca. 1992–ca. 1994), Duck Soup Studios (1994–1995) and its division The Front (1995–1997), MJZ and its satellite Stimmung (1997–ca. 1999), and Windmill Lane and its subsidiary Pusher (2003–ca. 2005).

He has directed commercials for Children's Medical Center (Dallas) (2010), Fruitopia (1997), KCRW (1996), Pier 1 Imports, and United Airlines (2006 and 2008), among others.

In 2006, he was asked to explore animation concepts for a feature film adaptation of The Amazing Adventures of Kavalier & Clay. The project fell through, but Caliri posted two and a half minutes of concept footage he directed, titled The Escapist v.s. The Iron Gauntlet, on his Vimeo channel.

As a still photographer, he has worked for clients such as Capitol Records, Interscope Records and Helios Dance Theater.

In addition to this, he also DPed a number of short films, music videos and commercials and taught experimental animation at CalArts.

Since 1993, he and his software engineer brother Dyami Caliri have collaborated to create stop motion animation software. In 2005, they developed Dragonframe.

== Personal life ==
Caliri has two younger brothers, drummer Mario Calire and Dyami Caliri. He and his youngest brother Dyami legally changed the spelling of their last names from "Calire" to "Caliri" to reflect the original Italian spelling.

== Filmography ==
=== Music videos ===
- Soul Coughing, "Super Bon Bon", released December 1996
- Morphine, "Early to Bed", March 1997, nominated for a Grammy Award for Best Short Form Music Video in 1998
- Cypress Hill, "Boom Biddy Bye Bye (Fugees Remix)", August 1996, co-directed by Dante Ariola
- Marcy Playground, "Sex and Candy", October 1997
- Eels, "Your Lucky Day in Hell", December 1997
- Black Lab, "Time Ago", May 1998
- Cherry Poppin' Daddies, "Brown Derby Jump", July 1998
- Marcy Playground, "Comin' Up from Behind", March 1999
- The Shins, "The Rifle's Spiral", April 2012, co-directed by Alexander Juhasz

=== Title sequences ===
- Big Apple, 2001, opening credits
- Lemony Snicket's A Series of Unfortunate Events, 2004, end titles
- Madagascar: Escape 2 Africa, 2008, end titles
- United States of Tara, 2009, opening credits, won the Primetime Emmy Award for Outstanding Main Title Design in 2009

=== Short films ===
- The Escapist v.s. The Iron Gauntlet, 2006
- The Sun and the Seed, 2008

=== Album art ===
- Cypress Hill, Cypress Hill III: Temples of Boom, 1995, photography
- Marcy Playground, Shapeshifter, 1999, photography
- The Wallflowers, Red Letter Days, 2002, art direction / packaging / photography
