= Exit Wounds (The Wallflowers album) =

Studio album by the Wallflowers
- Released: July 9, 2021
- Studio: RubyRed Productions (Santa Monica, California)
- Genres: Americana; Roots rock; pop rock; power pop
- Length: 40:01
- Label: New West Records
- Producer: Butch Walker

The Wallflowers chronology
Glad All Over (2012)	Exit Wounds (2021)

Singles from Exit Wounds
- 1. "Roots and Wings" Released: April 9, 2021

Exit Wounds is the seventh studio album by the Wallflowers, their first in nine years since the release of Glad All Over (2012). The album debuted No. 183 on the US Billboard 200. On Billboard's Top Album Sales chart it debuted at No. 3, making it the band's highest-charting album yet. It was released by New West Records on July 9, 2021. Singer-songwriter Shelby Lynne's backing vocals are featured on four tracks. "Roots and Wings" was released as the first single on April 9, 2021.

== Background ==
Although the album was written and finished before the COVID-19 pandemic, Jakob Dylan said he said he did not want to put it out during a time of such uncertainty and suffering. In speaking to Uproxx about the origins of the album he said "these songs are written before Covid, but we still had the dumpster fire of everything else that was happening before that." Dylan noted that while he does not consider it to be a political album, current events in the United States certainly had an impact on his writing. As he emphasized to Consequence of Sound, perseverance in spite of turbulent times is a major theme on the album. This theme is especially notable on the track "I'll Let You Down (But I Will Not Give You Up)", which uses a "wayward bus" as a metaphor for social upheaval in the United States, but features a hopeful chorus with Shelby Lynne singing harmony.

== Reception ==
Exit Wounds received a score of 72 out of 100 from Metacritic, indicating "generally favorable reviews". Mojo gave it four out of five stars and called it Dylan's "best original work by some yards." In a mostly positive review, American Songwriter wrote that "the sound is leaner, a little less rough around the edges and solidly in sync as well." Rolling Stone's review was mixed, giving the album three out of five stars, and writing that Dylan "can evoke an Americana-tinged Warren Zevon, gruff but tender, with the best songs featuring Shelby Lynne's empathetic vocals."

== Musical style ==
Professional ratings
Aggregate scores
Source	Rating
Metacritic	72/100
Review scores
Source	Rating
Mojo	4/5 stars
Glide Magazine	3.5/5 stars
American Songwriter	3.5/5 stars
Uncut	3.5/5 stars
Pitchfork	7/10 stars
Rolling Stone	3/5 stars
Classic Rock	3.5/5 stars

Pitchfork assessed the album as a return to classic rock with no adjustments made to accommodate "contemporary fashion," referencing the album's opener "Maybe Your Heart's Not in It No More" as a showcase of "soulful Americana."

Classic Rock magazine largely agreed in terms of the style of the album, describing the majority of the music as radiating a "melancholic Americana". Classic Rock also praised its variety: referencing elements of pop rock, roots rock, as well as a country music influence, due in large part to the contributions of guest vocalist Shelby Lynne on four tracks. The album's overall genre was described as a combination of Americana and rock-inflected power pop.

Glide magazine classified the album as having a "stripped-down guitar-forward" sound.

PopMatters wrote that the album was not a blues album, but carried a "subtle nod to the blues throughout", suggesting an album more like The Rolling Stones than The Beatles.

== Track listing ==
All tracks are written by Jakob Dylan.

No.	Title	Length
1.	"Maybe Your Heart's Not In It No More"	5:00
2.	"Roots and Wings"	3:54
3.	"I Hear the Ocean (When I Wanna Hear Trains)"	4:29
4.	"The Dive Bar In My Heart"	3:31
5.	"Darlin' Hold On (w/Shelby Lynne)"	3:42
6.	"Move the River"	4:28
7.	"I'll Let You Down (But I Will Not Give You Up)"	4:04
8.	"Wrong End of the Spear"	4:06
9.	"Who's That Man Walking 'Round My Garden"	2:58
10.	"The Daylight Between Us"	3:44

== Personnel ==
- Jakob Dylan – vocals, guitar
- Butch Walker – producer, guitar, keyboards, percussion, backing vocals, recording engineer
- Mark Stepro – drums
- Whynot Jansveld – bass, mastering engineer
- Aaron Embry – keyboards
- Val McCallum – guitar
- Shelby Lynne – vocals (tracks 1, 5–7)
- Brian Griffin – drums (track 6)
- Todd Stopera – assistant engineer
- Chris Dugan – mix engineer
- Artwork and design: Bob Carmichael, SEEN (credited as Rob Carmichael, SEEN)
- Interior Photo: Paige Dylan

== Charts ==
Chart performance for Exit Wounds
Chart (2021)	Peak position
German Albums (Offizielle Top 100)	90
Scottish Albums (Official Charts)	40
Swiss Albums (Schweizer Hitparade)	29
UK Americana Albums (Official Charts)	4
UK Independent Albums (Official Charts)	11
US Billboard 200	183
US Top Album Sales (Billboard)	3
US Americana/Folk Albums (Billboard)	4
US Indie Store Album Sales (Billboard)	10
US Top Rock Albums (Billboard)	32

Singles

Year	Single	Chart	Position
2021	"Roots and Wings"	US Triple A Airplay	6
2021	"Roots and Wings"	US Rock & Alternative Airplay	46
