= Dragonframe =

Stop motion animation software

- Developer: DZED Systems
- Release: March 2008; 18 years ago
- Operating system: Windows, macOS, Linux
- License: Proprietary
- Website: www.dragonframe.com

Dragonframe is a stop motion animation software. It has been used to make several full-length motion picture films, including Disney's Frankenweenie and Laika's Coraline, The Boxtrolls, and ParaNorman, as well as the stop motion television show Shaun the Sheep. It has also been used to shoot stop motion scenes in live action movies, including the holochess scene in Star Wars: The Force Awakens, and numerous stop motion shorts.

== History ==
Dragonframe was initially developed by brothers Jamie and Dyami Caliri while they were creating a commercial for United Airlines called "The Dragon". It was later developed into a commercial product, marketed by DZED Systems.

In 2014 Dragonframe won an Ub Iwerks award at the annual Annie Awards.

In 2026 Jamie Caliri and Dyami Caliri were each awarded an Academy Scientific and Technical Award for "the design, engineering and continuing development of the Dragonframe software suite."

== Features ==
To create basic stop motion animations, the software controls a digital camera. Additional hardware add-ons can be connected for controlling lighting and camera movement. The software allows the user to manipulate the camera and the scene, and then to combine the frames into a sequence of animated frames. Animators can view several individual frames overlaid for comparison, and they can preview sequences of frames overlaid on a moving background.
