= Dream Widow =

Studio album by Dream Widow
- Released: March 25, 2022
- Studio: Unnamed house in Encino, Los Angeles; Studio 606, Los Angeles
- Genre: Thrash metal; doom metal; sludge metal
- Length: 42:12
- Label: Roswell; RCA

Dave Grohl chronology
Hail Satin (2021)	Dream Widow (2022)	The Essential Foo Fighters (2022)

Foo Fighters chronology
Medicine at Midnight (2021)	Dream Widow (2022)	But Here We Are (2023)

Professional ratings
Review scores
Source	Rating
AllMusic	3.5/5 stars
Louder	4/5 stars

Dream Widow is the only studio album by the fictional thrash metal band Dream Widow. It was made for the Foo Fighters film, Studio 666.

The album consists of recordings made by Foo Fighters frontman Dave Grohl and Fireball Ministry guitarist James A Rota II. The album was released to streaming under the Foo Fighters name. The album came out the day Foo Fighters drummer Taylor Hawkins died.

== As used in Studio 666 ==
In Studio 666 the Foo Fighters are planning to make their tenth studio album. They got an old abandoned house with great acoustics. They decide to record the album there. After front man Dave Grohl developed a case of writer's block, he goes down to the house's basement to find a Demonic book and a half completed tape from the last band to record there. He decides that this will be their next album. Throughout the movie the band is seen recording the album with the songs getting longer and Dave getting crazier. The rest of the band learns from their neighbor that the last band were Satan worshippers whose front man got possessed by the book to finish the album. This led to the death of himself and the rest of his band. Grohl eats guitarist Chris Shiflett after he walks away from the project. Grohl sliced keyboards Rami Jaffee in half with a chainsaw while he was having sex with the neighbor. He decapitated drummer Taylor Hawkins with a cymbal, after he finished the album. The two surviving members of the band (Nate Mendel and Pat Smear) turned the house pool into holy water and saves Grohl.

== Track listing ==
All tracks are written by Dave Grohl and James A Rota II, except where noted.

Side one
No.	Title	Length
1.	"Encino"	1:39
2.	"Cold"	5:14
3.	"March of the Insane"	3:31
4.	"The Sweet Abyss"	4:20
5.	"Angels with Severed Wings"	4:33
Total length:		19:35

Side two
No.	Title	Writer(s)	Length
6.	"Come All Ye Unfaithful"	Grohl	5:35
7.	"Becoming"	Grohl	7:21
8.	"Lacrimus dei Ebrius"	Grohl	10:21
Total length:			23:17

== Personnel ==
From the liner notes.

Musicians

- Dave Grohl – drums, bass, guitar, vocals
- James A Rota II – lead guitar (tracks 1–5)
- Oliver Roman – keyboards (tracks 2 & 4)
- Rami Jaffee – keyboards (tracks 1 & 8)

Technical

- Darrell Thorp – engineer, mixing
- Oliver Roman – engineer
- John Lousteau – engineer
- Jerred Pollaci – engineering assistance
- Charlie Lo Presti – engineering assistance
- David Ives – mastering
- Morning Breath Inc. – art direction, design
