= The Lost Notebooks of Hank Williams =

Studio album by various artists
- Released: October 4, 2011
- Genre: Country
- Length: 36:51
- Label: Columbia, Third Man
- Producer: Mary Martin

The Lost Notebooks of Hank Williams is a 2011 album by folk, country, and rock artists who set music to lyrics by country musician Hank Williams. The album was released on October 4, 2011.

== Background ==
Williams died suddenly in 1953 at the age of 29 while traveling to his next scheduled concert on New Years Day in Canton, Ohio.

In 2006, a janitor working for Sony/ATV Music Publishing claimed to have found Williams' unfinished lyrics inside a Sony-owned dumpster. She said that she had sold Williams' notes to a representative of the Honky-Tonk Hall of Fame and the Rock-N-Roll Roadshow. She was then accused of theft, but the charges were dropped when a judge determined the janitor's version of events to be true. The unfinished lyrics were later returned to Sony/ATV, which handed them to Bob Dylan in 2008 to complete the songs for an album release. Dylan completed one song; others were completed by Alan Jackson, Norah Jones, Jack White, Lucinda Williams, Vince Gill, Rodney Crowell, Patty Loveless, Holly Williams, Levon Helm, Jakob Dylan, Sheryl Crow and Merle Haggard.

== Reception ==
Professional ratings
Aggregate scores
Source	Rating
Metacritic	(76/100)
Review scores
Source	Rating
The Observer	Favorable
Entertainment Weekly	B+
The Daily Telegraph	4/5 stars
Allmusic	4/5 stars

Neil Spencer in The Observer wrote, "The air of reverence hangs heavily, with Williams's droll humour and proto-rockabilly style largely absent [...] An entertaining exercise, though of Hank's celebrated yodel there is, alas, no sign." Entertainment Weekly described the artist performances as "original melodies, some too wan for the strength of the lyrics, which range from the deeply romantic to the corrosively aggressive."

The Daily Telegraph rated the album four stars out of five with a favorable review, saying, "It is rare that any posthumous release becomes an essential part of an artist’s canon, and the very simplicity of Williams’s oeuvre mitigates against declaring classic status for lovingly crafted yet essentially minor songs. But the album is a beauty, none the less, the care put into it confirming Williams’s exalted position in the tower of song". Stephen Thomas Erlewine of Allmusic gave the album 4 out of 5 stars, saying that the artists selected "treat it with respect but not undue reverence, something that unites all the artists here", and called it "something real, imperfect, and resonant".

== Track listing ==
No.	Title	Artist	Length
1.	"You've Been Lonesome, Too"	Alan Jackson	3:24
2.	"The Love That Faded"	Bob Dylan	2:32
3.	"How Many Times Have You Broken My Heart?"	Gillian Welch, Norah Jones	3:33
4.	"You Know That I Know"	Jack White	3:54
5.	"I'm So Happy I Found You"	Lucinda Williams	3:54
6.	"I Hope You Shed a Million Tears"	Rodney Crowell, Vince Gill	4:01
7.	"You're Through Fooling Me"	Patty Loveless	2:06
8.	"You'll Never Again Be Mine"	Levon Helm	3:11
9.	"Blue Is My Heart"	Holly Williams (with Hank Williams Jr.; uncredited)	2:44
10.	"Oh, Mama, Come Home"	Jakob Dylan	2:27
11.	"Angel Mine"	Sheryl Crow	3:37
12.	"The Sermon on the Mount"	Merle Haggard	2:08

== Chart performance ==
Chart (2011)	Peak position
U.S. Billboard Top Country Albums	11
U.S. Billboard 200	42
