= Breach (The Wallflowers album) =

(Breach)

Studio album by the Wallflowers
- Released: October 10, 2000
- Studio: Sunset Sound, The Sound Factory (Hollywood); Village Recorder (Los Angeles); Sound Inn (Tokyo, Japan)
- Genre: Alternative rock; roots rock
- Length: 42:53
- Label: Interscope
- Producer: Andrew Slater; Michael Penn

The Wallflowers chronology
Bringing Down the Horse (1996)	(Breach) (2000)	Red Letter Days (2002)

Singles from Breach
- 1. "Sleepwalker" Released: September 11, 2000; 2. "Letters from the Wasteland" Released: 2001

Breach (stylized as (Breach)) is the third studio album by the Wallflowers. The album's first single was "Sleepwalker", the video of which poked fun at lead singer Jakob Dylan's "rock star" status following the success of Bringing Down the Horse (1996). Guests on the album included Elvis Costello, who performed vocals on "Murder 101". Despite positive critical reception, the album failed to match the commercial success of Bringing Down the Horse, seeing a commercial decline. (Breach) peaked at number 13 on the Billboard 200 and received gold certification by the Recording Industry Association of America (RIAA). “Sleepwalker”, however, peaked at 73 on the Billboard Hot 100.

== Background ==
A Spin magazine article looking back on Jakob Dylan's 30-year career noted that Breach alludes to his mixed feelings about his lineage and fame more than any other album in his discography. Spin commented that "Dylan addresses the cynics on lead single 'Sleepwalker,' a catchy rocker that reflects how Dylan felt at the height of his fame: like a dazed character drifting through his own life." They similarly point to "Hand me Down", where "Dylan sings self-effacingly about the perception of having failed to live up to his pedigree." As part of an interview for the piece, Dylan told Spin that "I like that record a lot. It’s more complicated than Bringing Down The Horse, and I think I started getting better as a songwriter.”

In another retrospective interview with Uproxx, Dylan said that while this was a "difficult record to make," he feels it features some of his best songwriting. He told music critic Steven Hyden that "By Breach, I knew there was going to be scrutiny on some of the songs and I decided that I was just going to not care about it."

== Reception ==
Professional ratings
Aggregate scores
Source	Rating
Metacritic	71/100
Review scores
Source	Rating
AllMusic	4.5/5 stars
Billboard	4/5 stars
Entertainment Weekly	B+
Q	3/5 stars
Revolver	4/5 stars
Rolling Stone	4/5 stars
Spin	4/10
The Village Voice	B−

Despite weak album sales, Breach received strong reviews from critics. AllMusic said of the album: "On the surface, there's not much different between this album and its predecessor, but the songs are stronger, sharper, and the performances are lean, muscular, and immediate." Rolling Stone was also receptive of the album, stating: "The slow stuff might be a bit ponderous, but the first six or seven songs manage a rare trick: They're incandescent enough to jump out at you on the radio, yet are steeped in a type of introspective inquiry that was once integral to rock & roll, and has nearly vanished."

== Track listing ==
All songs written by Jakob Dylan.

1. "Letters from the Wasteland" – 4:29
2. "Hand Me Down" – 3:35
3. "Sleepwalker" – 3:31
4. "I've Been Delivered" – 5:01
5. "Witness" – 3:34
6. "Some Flowers Bloom Dead" – 4:44
7. "Mourning Train" – 4:04
8. "Up from Under" – 3:39
9. "Murder 101" – 2:32
10. "Birdcage" – 3:28 (total 7:42 with "Babybird")
11. "Babybird" (hidden track) – 3:40

=== Bonus CD ===
Some editions include a two-track bonus CD.

1. "Invisible City" (live) – 6:29
  - On alternative releases, bonus track one is an acoustic version of "Sleepwalker" – 3:17
2. "Sleepwalker" (Andy Wallace remix) – 3:25

== Personnel ==
Personnel adapted from (Breach) liner notes

The Wallflowers

- Mario Calire – drums
- Jakob Dylan – lead and backing vocals, rhythm guitar
- Rami Jaffee – keyboards, vibes, backing vocals
- Greg Richling – bass guitar, percussion, backing vocals
- Michael Ward – lead guitar, backing vocals

Additional personnel

- Matt Chamberlain – drums
- Greg Leisz – additional musician
- Jon Brion – additional musician
- Lenny Castro – percussion
- Mike Campbell – guitar
- Elvis Costello – backing vocals
- Michael Penn – backing vocals
- Chris Penn – backing vocals
- Frank Black – backing vocals
- Gary Louris – backing vocals
- Buddy Judge – backing vocals
- Joul Derouin – strings
- Suzie Katayama – strings
- Karie Prescott – strings
- Michele Richards – strings
- Greg Adams – horns
- Kenneth Kugler – horns
- Nicholas Lane – horns
- Salvator Cracchiolo – horns
- Mitchell Froom – horns arranger
- Michael Penn – production
- Andrew Slater – production
- Ted Jensen – mastering
- Tom Lord-Alge – mixing

== Charts ==
Chart (2000)	Peak position
Australian Albums (ARIA)	105
Canada (RPM)	6
German Albums (Offizielle Top 100)	88
Italian Albums (FIMI)	48
New Zealand Albums (RMNZ)	50
Swedish Albums (Sverigetopplistan)	35
Swiss Albums (Schweizer Hitparade)	48
UK Albums (OCC)	161
US Billboard 200	13
