= Rami Jaffee =

American musician

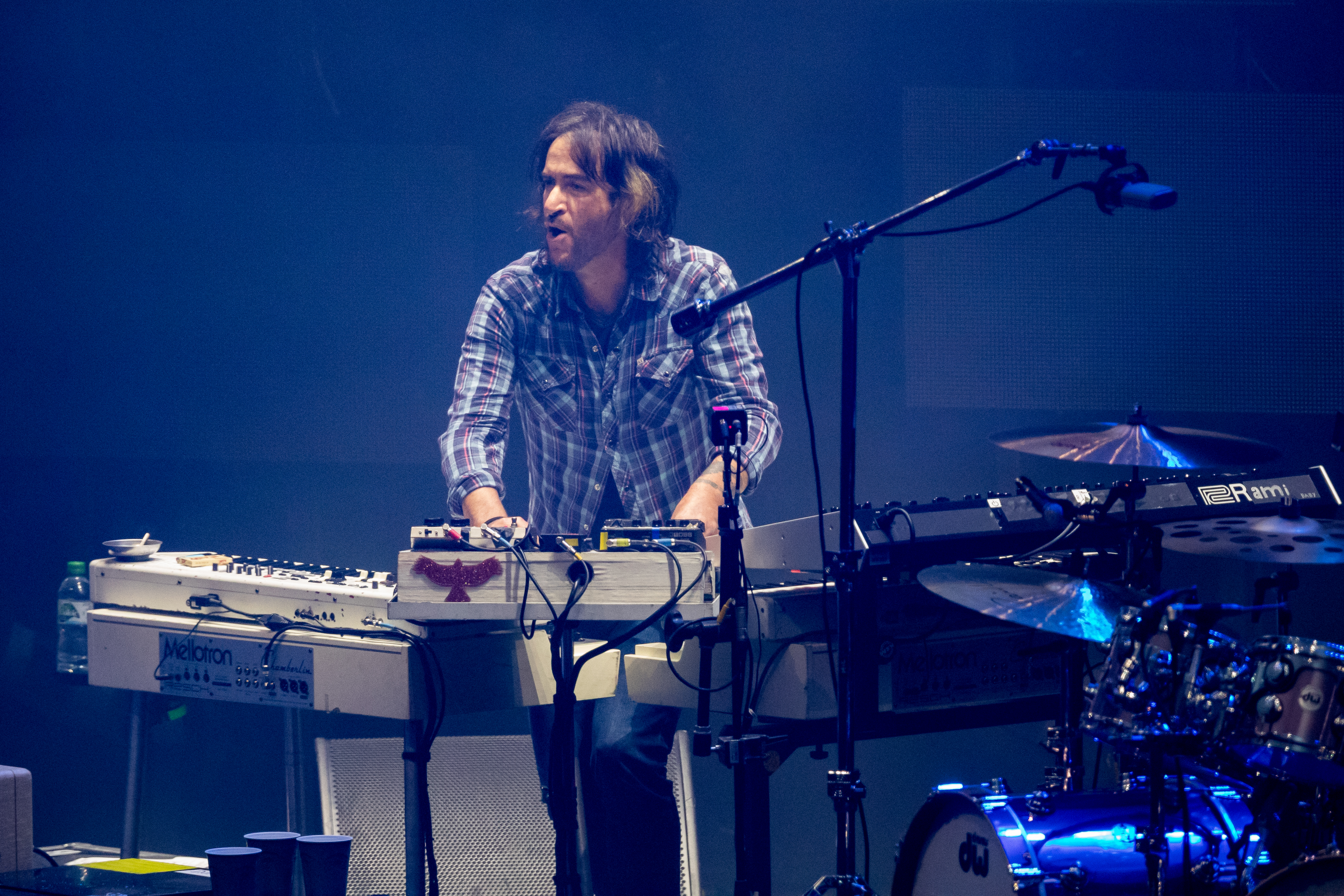
- Jaffee in 2023

Background information
- Born: March 11, 1969 (age 57)
- Origin: Los Angeles, United States
- Genre: Rock
- Occupation: Musician
- Instruments: Keyboards; accordion; harmonica; percussion
- Years active: 1989–present
- Member of: Foo Fighters
- Formerly of: The Wallflowers; Sound City Players
- Website: www.ramijaffee.com

Rami Jaffee (born March 11, 1969) is an American musician. He is the keyboardist for the rock band Foo Fighters, which he initially joined in a touring and session capacity in 2005. He has contributed to seven of the band's studio albums, and formally joined the band as a full-time member in 2015.

Prior to joining Foo Fighters, Jaffee was a member of The Wallflowers from 1990 to 2005, and again from 2012 to 2013. He has worked with many artists including Pete Yorn, Stone Sour, Joseph Arthur and Coheed and Cambria.

== Early life ==
Jaffee was born on March 11, 1969, to a Russian Ashkenazi Jewish father and a Moroccan Sephardic Jewish mother in Los Angeles. When he was 13, he purchased a keyboard and was soon playing with local bands. After graduating from Fairfax High School, he continued to play in various bands, and he took session work in recording studios.

== Career ==
Around 1989, Jakob Dylan and his friend Tobi Miller formed a group called the Apples, playing various clubs in the L.A. area. While waiting in line at Canter's Deli after 2:00 am, Jaffee heard the Apples wanted an organist and pianist, and he was told that Dylan and Miller were then in the Kibitz Room bar attached to Canter's. They met; Dylan and Miller played Jaffee some demo tapes in their car stereo, and Jaffee immediately joined the group. A few weeks later, they changed their name to the Wallflowers and signed with Virgin Records. In 1992, they released their first album, The Wallflowers. The Wallflowers toured throughout the U.S. and Canada in 1992 and early 1993. They served as the opening act for Cracker, the Spin Doctors and 10,000 Maniacs, and they started headlining their own shows.

Virgin appeared to lose interest in the Wallflowers because of poor album sales. The band's two familiar label representatives left the label, after which the record company tried to use the Dylan name as a selling point, against the band's directive. In mid-1993, the label released the band from their contract. Other labels were not interested in signing the band, and Jaffee filled his time by playing gigs with El Vez as well as taking more session work. He kept his interest in the Wallflowers, saying later, "I believe in these songs, and I'm here for the duration because no one is writing songs like these anymore, songs that have room for a Hammond organ and me."

The Wallflowers signed to Interscope Records in 1994. While working with T Bone Burnett, who was producing the band's next album, Jaffee was frequently called in as a session musician for producers Paul Fox, Matt Hyde and Rick Neigher. Because of this, in 1996 he was credited on albums by Rickie Lee Jones, the Hookers, Leah Andreone and Chalk FarM. At the same time, the Wallflowers released their second album, Bringing Down the Horse, which went quadruple Platinum. The band toured in support of the album, but in 1997, Jaffee and his wife had a daughter, and he left the tour to be with his family for two months. That same year, he performed session work with Everclear, Grant Lee Buffalo, Richie Sambora, Macy Gray, Jeremy Toback, Joe Henry, Melissa Etheridge, Ramsay Midwood and Garth Brooks.

The Wallflowers received a Grammy nomination in 1998 for "Heroes" which appeared in the film Godzilla. On the same film soundtrack Jaffee contributed keyboards to the Foo Fighters track "A320" which marked his first collaboration with the band. In late 2000, the band released Breach. The band headlined their own tour for a year but also opened for Tom Petty and the Heartbreakers, the Who and John Mellencamp. Following this, the Wallflowers released Red Letter Days, touring again during 2002–2003. With a new drummer, the band released Rebel, Sweetheart, their fifth album, on May 24, 2005. The Wallflowers toured to promote the album, but Jaffee disagreed with the band, and he abandoned the tour with three dates remaining.

In 2005, Jaffee began collaborating with Foo Fighters. He was made an official member in 2015.

Jaffee led the house band on The Fran Drescher Show and, as of 2010, co-owned a recording studio called Fonogenic Studios in the San Fernando Valley.

In 2012 and 2013, Jaffee was a member of the Sound City Players, a supergroup formed by Dave Grohl that, in addition to appearing in Grohl's 2013 documentary, Sound City, played a limited number of tour dates in 2013. The Sound City Players consisted of a rotating number of artists including Grohl, Jaffee, Stevie Nicks, Alain Johannes, Paul McCartney, Rick Springfield, Josh Homme, Trent Reznor, Krist Novoselic and more.

In 2012, Jaffee returned to the Wallflowers, who were coming off a long hiatus. They released the album Glad All Over in 2012 and toured in support of it that year and also in 2013. Jaffee then left the band again.

== Discography (partial) ==
Year	Group	Title	Label	Instrument
1992	The Wallflowers	The Wallflowers	Virgin	Piano, Hammond Organ
1993	Darlene & Co	Absence of Uniformity	Sovereign	
1994	El Vez	How Great Thou Art	Sympathy for the Record Industry	Hammond Organ
1994	El Vez	Fun in Español	Sympathy for the Record Industry	Hammond Organ
1994	Victoria Williams	Loose	Atlantic	Hammond Organ
1995	Edwin McCain	Honor Among Thieves	Lava/Atlantic	Hammond Organ
1996	Tina & the B-Side Movement	Salvation	Sire/Elektra	Piano, Hammond Organ, Farfisa
1996	El Vez	Never Been To Spain (Until Now)	Munster	Keyboards
1996	Phil Cody	The Sons of Intemperance Offering	Interscope	Piano, Accordion, Hammond Organ, Mellotron
1996	The Wallflowers	Bringing Down the Horse	Interscope	piano, Hammond B-3 organ, Vox Continental organ, upright piano
1996	Chalk FarM	Notwithstanding	Columbia	Accordion
1996	Leah Andreone	Veiled	RCA	Organ
1996	The Hookers	Calico	RCA	Piano, Accordion, Hammond Organ
1996	Rickie Lee Jones	Music from Party of Five	Reprise	–
1997	The Wallflowers	KCRW Rare on Air, Vol. 3	Mammoth	Piano
1997	The Honeyrods	The Honeyrods	Capricorn	Piano, Wurlitzer
1997	Everclear	So Much for the Afterglow	Capitol	Vox Organ
1997	Uma	Fare Well	Refuge	Piano, Hammond Organ, Vox Organ, Optigan
1997	Soul Asylum	I Know What You Did Last Summer	Sony Columbia	–
1997	Andy If	Road Trip	CU	–
1998	Richie Sambora	Undiscovered Soul	Mercury	Accordion, Hammond Organ, Clapping, Optigan
1998	Agents of Good Roots	One by One	RCA	Organ
1998	Esthero	Breath From Another	Sony/Works	Optigan
1998	The Wallflowers, Foo Fighters	Godzilla: The Album	Epic/Sony	–
1998	Scott Thomas Band	California	Elektra	–
1998	Grant Lee Buffalo	Jubilee	Slash/Warner	–
1999	Chlorine	Primer	Time Bomb/BMG	Keyboards
	Matt Brown	Morning After Medicine Show	EMI Uncle Green, released 2011	Keyboards
2000	The Wallflowers	(Breach)	Interscope	Keyboards, Vibraphone, Backing vocals
2002	The Wallflowers	Red Letter Days	Interscope	Keyboards
2005	Foo Fighters	In Your Honor	RCA Records/Roswell	Keyboards
2005	The Wallflowers	Rebel, Sweetheart	Interscope	Keyboards
2006	Willie Nile	Streets of New York	00:02:59/Reincarnate	Hammond Organ
2006	Foo Fighters	Skin and Bones	RCA Records	piano, Mellotron, accordion, organ
2006	Pete Yorn	Westerns EP	RED Ink/Columbia	B-3 Organ, Production
2007	Mike Brown & the Fart Face Band	American Hotel	Oasis Entertainment	Hammond Organ, Keyboard
2007	Coheed and Cambria	Good Apollo, I'm Burning Star IV, Volume Two: No World for Tomorrow	Columbia Records	Synthesisers, Piano
2007	Foo Fighters	Echoes, Silence, Patience, and Grace	RCA Records	keyboard, accordion
2008	The Fallen Stars	Where the road bends	Kiss My Squirrel Records	Hammond Organ, Keyboard, Accordion, Producer
2010	The Fallen Stars	Heart Like Mine	Kiss My Squirrel Records	Hammond Organ, Keyboard, Accordion
2011	Foo Fighters	Wasting Light	RCA Records	keyboards, organ, Mellotron
2012	The Wallflowers	Glad All Over	Columbia/Interscope	Keyboards
2013	Joseph Arthur	The Ballad of Boogie Christ	Lonely Astronaut Records	Organ
2013	Chuck Ragan	Till Midnight	SideOneDummy	Keyboard, Glockenspiel, Accordion
2014	Gunash	Same Old Nightmare	Go Down Records	Hammond Organ
2014	Foo Fighters	Sonic Highways	RCA Records	organ, Mellotron, piano, Wurlitzer, clavinet, gang vocals, "space keys"
2015	Foo Fighters	Saint Cecilia (EP)	RCA Records	keyboards
2016	Gunash	SuperHeroes In Town (EP)	Go Down Records	Hammond Organ, keyboards
2017	Gunash	Great Expectations	Go Down Records	Hammond Organ, Keyboards, Artistic Producer
2017	Foo Fighters	Concrete and Gold	RCA Records	piano, synthesizer, Mellotron, Casio SK-1, organ, percussion, Farfisa organ, ARP String Ensemble, Clavinet, Reface, Wurlitzer, vibraphone, harmonium, pump organ, B3 organ, Moog, songwriter, producer
2021	Foo Fighters	Medicine at Midnight	RCA Records	keyboards, songwriter, producer
2021	Fury In The Slaughterhouse	Now (Song "Letter To Myself")	Starwatch Entertainment	keyboards
2022	Dream Widow	Dream Widow	RCA Records	keyboards
2023	Foo Fighters	But Here We Are	RCA Records	keyboards, songwriter, producer
2026	Foo Fighters	Your Favorite Toy	RCA Records	piano, keyboards, theremin, songwriter, producer
