= The Wallflowers (album) =

Studio album by the Wallflowers
- Released: August 25, 1992
- Recorded: 1991–1992
- Genre: Alternative rock; roots rock
- Length: 69:29
- Label: Virgin
- Producer: Paul Fox, Andrew Slater, The Wallflowers

The Wallflowers chronology
The Wallflowers (1992)	Bringing Down the Horse (1996)

Singles from The Wallflowers
- 1. "Ashes to Ashes" Released: 1992

Professional ratings
Review scores
Source	Rating
AllMusic	3/5 stars
Calgary Herald	B+
Christgau's Consumer Guide	(dud)
The New Rolling Stone Album Guide	2/5 stars
Rolling Stone	4/5 stars

The Wallflowers is the Wallflowers' debut album, released on August 25, 1992, on Virgin Records. The song "Ashes to Ashes" was released as a single from the album a week before the album's release.

== Track listing ==
All songs written and composed by Jakob Dylan, except "After the Blackbird Sings" composed by Dylan, Peter Yanowitz, Tobi Miller, Barrie Maguire and Rami Jaffee.

1. "Shy of the Moon" – 3:17
2. "Sugarfoot" – 5:28
3. "Sidewalk Annie" – 5:18
4. "Hollywood" – 7:02
5. "Be Your Own Girl" – 5:16
6. "Another One in the Dark" – 6:31
7. "Ashes to Ashes" – 5:00
8. "After the Blackbird Sings" – 4:49
9. "Somebody Else's Money" – 8:26
10. "Asleep at the Wheel" – 4:49
11. "Honeybee" – 9:14
12. "For the Life of Me" – 4:16

== Personnel ==
Personnel adapted from The Wallflowers liner notes

The Wallflowers

- Jakob Dylan – lead vocals, rhythm guitar, piano
- Rami Jaffee – piano, Hammond organ
- Tobi Miller – lead guitar, backing vocals
- Barrie Maguire – bass guitar, backing vocals
- Peter Yanowitz – drums, percussion, backing vocals

== Charts ==
Chart performance for The Wallflowers
Chart (1993)	Peak position
Australian Albums (ARIA)	154
