= Seeing Things (album) =

Studio album by Jakob Dylan
- Released: June 10, 2008
- Recorded: 2007–2008
- Genre: Alternative rock; folk rock
- Length: 37:55
- Label: Columbia
- Producer: Rick Rubin

Jakob Dylan chronology
Seeing Things (2008)	Women + Country (2010)

Professional ratings
Review scores
Source	Rating
AllMusic	4/5 stars
Billboard	(favorable)
Blender	4/5 stars
Hartford Courant	(favorable)
PopMatters	8/10 stars
Rolling Stone	2.5/5 stars
The Skinny	2/5 stars
Spin	3/5 stars

Seeing Things is the first solo studio album by American singer-songwriter Jakob Dylan. The album was released on June 10, 2008, by Columbia Records and was recorded at the Hollywood Hills home of producer Rick Rubin.

Dylan performed songs from the album for a small group on May 8, 2008, at Nissan's Live Sets in Los Angeles, California. Videos of these performances are available for viewing at Jakob Dylan @ Yahoo Music.

Dylan also announced his first solo tour with his band The Gold Mountain Rebels to promote the album beginning May 17, 2008, with appearances on the Late Show with David Letterman on June 11, on The Tonight Show with Jay Leno on July 15, and on The Late Late Show with Craig Ferguson on August 4.

== Extended Play release ==
A 4-track EP version was released, featuring tracks 1,5,6 & 9 of the full album.

== Track listing ==
All songs written and composed by Jakob Dylan, except "I Told You I Couldn't Stop" composed by Dylan and Matt Sweeney.

1. "Evil Is Alive and Well" – 3:56
2. "Valley of the Low Sun" – 3:57
3. "All Day and All Night" – 3:28
4. "Everybody Pays as They Go" – 3:00
5. "Will It Grow" – 4:49
6. "I Told You I Couldn't Stop" – 4:14
7. "War Is Kind" – 3:08
8. "Something Good This Way Comes" – 3:39
9. "On up the Mountain" – 3:45
10. "This End of the Telescope" – 3:59
11. "Costa Rica" (iTunes Bonus Track) – 3:35

== Personnel ==
- Jakob Dylan – bass, guitar, vocals
- Rick Rubin – producer
- Z. Berg – musician
- Mathieu Bitton – art direction, design
- Jason Boesel – musician
- Lindsay Chase – production coordination
- Rich Egan – management
- Jason Lader – engineer, mixing
- Dana Nielsen – engineer
- Vlado Meller – mastering
- James Minchin – photography
- Mark Santangelo – assistant

== Charts ==
Chart performance of Seeing Things
Chart (2008)	Peak position
Austrian Albums (Ö3 Austria)	71
German Albums (Offizielle Top 100)	50
Swiss Albums (Schweizer Hitparade)	42
UK Albums (OCC)	106
US Billboard 200	24
US Top Rock Albums (Billboard)	8
