= The Wallflowers =

American rock band

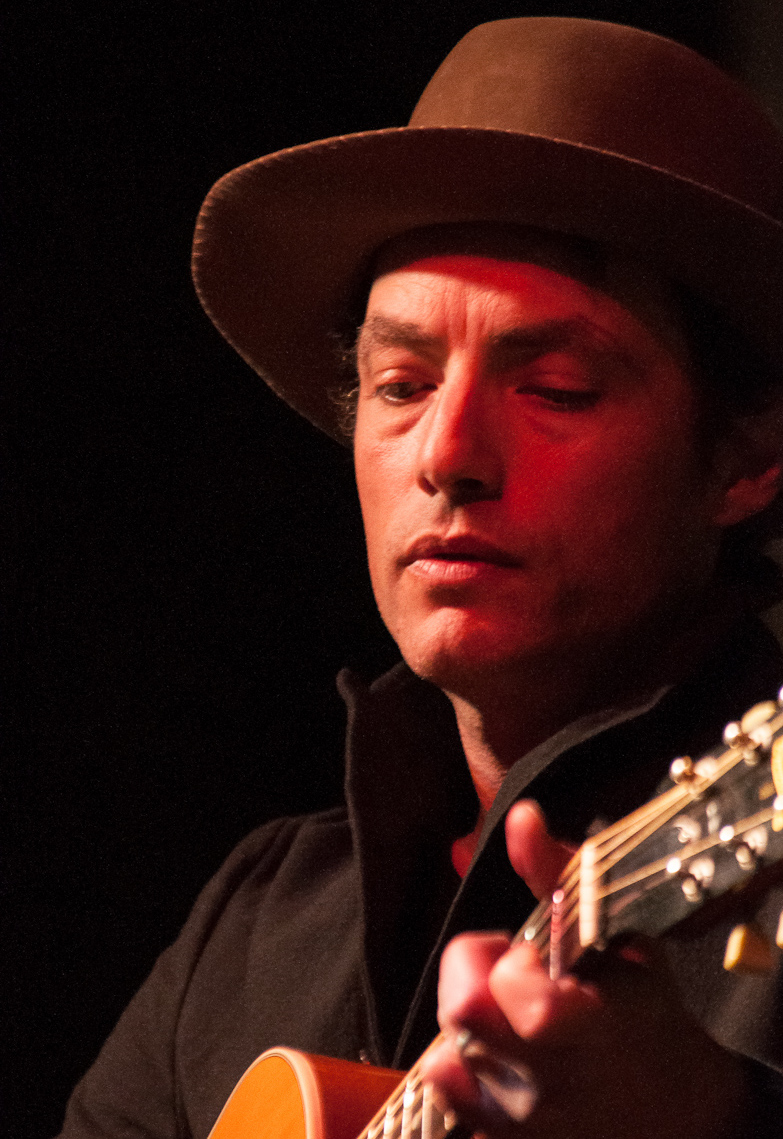
- Jakob Dylan performing at an event at Civic Center Park in Denver, October 2012

Background information
- Origin: Los Angeles, California, U.S.
- Genres: Rock; roots rock; alternative rock
- Works: Discography
- Years active: 1989–present
- Labels: New West Records; Columbia Records; Interscope Records; Virgin Records
- Members: Jakob Dylan
- Past members: Tobi Miller; Barrie Maguire; Peter Yanowitz; Rami Jaffee; Greg Richling; Mario Calire; Michael Ward; Fred Eltringham; Rob Forster; Stuart Mathis; Jack Irons
- Website: wallflowersmusic.com

The Wallflowers is an American rock solo project of American singer-songwriter and multi-instrumentalist Jakob Dylan. The Wallflowers were originally a roots rock band formed in Los Angeles by Dylan and guitarist Tobi Miller. It has undergone several personnel changes but has remained centered on Dylan.

The band signed with Virgin Records to release their debut studio album (1992), which despite critical praise, failed to chart and was their only release with the label. After the success of their 1996 single "6th Avenue Heartache," the band signed with Interscope Records to release their second album, Bringing Down the Horse (1996), which spawned their signature song, "One Headlight." Their third album, (Breach) (2000), yielded the single "Sleepwalker," which became their only song to enter the Billboard Hot 100 (previous singles their popularity notwithstanding, did not chart due to Billboard rules at the time). The group released two more albums—Red Letter Days (2002) and Rebel, Sweetheart (2005)—before going on hiatus. Their sixth and seventh albums, Glad All Over (2012) and Exit Wounds (2021) were met with continued praise. Lyrically, the band focuses on Dylan's introspection, exploring themes of nostalgia, heartache, purpose and insecurities.

The Wallflowers have sold over 10 million albums internationally. They have won two Grammy Awards—Best Rock Performance by a Duo or Group with Vocal and Best Rock Song for "One Headlight"—from six nominations. The song was included on Rolling Stone's list of the 100 Greatest Pop Songs. Billboard named "One Headlight" as the Greatest of All Time Adult Alternative Song, while "6th Avenue Heartache" ranked at No. 37 on the list. Of the band's songs, 15 have peaked in the top 10 of Billboard's Adult Alternative Airplay chart. Band members of the Wallflowers have been shared with other bands including Foo Fighters, Ozomatli, and Gogol Bordello. Two former members have been inducted into the Rock and Roll Hall of Fame.

== History ==
=== 1988–1990: Early history ===
In 1988 singer-guitarist Jakob Dylan called his childhood friend, Tobi Miller, also a guitarist, about starting a band. Dylan and Miller had been in several bands together in high school but went their separate ways upon graduation. Dylan had moved to New York City to go to art school while Miller had started his own band called the 45's. After the 45's broke up in 1989, Miller regained contact with Dylan and they began forming a band called the Apples. Barrie Maguire, who was in the 45's with Miller, joined the band as their bass player. In 1990, Peter Yanowitz was added as the drummer. The final member to join the group was keyboardist Rami Jaffee. Jaffee was an active member of the Los Angeles music scene and had been playing with several bands in the area. He met Dylan in 1990 in the Kibitz Room, a bar located in the back of Canter's, a Jewish deli located on Fairfax Avenue near West Hollywood, California. He had heard the Apples were looking for an organ player and after meeting and talking with Dylan in the Kibitz Room, the two listened to the band's demo tape in Dylan's car. Jaffee was impressed by the songs and asked to join the band's next rehearsal. After a long rehearsal session, Jaffee immediately joined the band.

=== 1991–1994: Debut album ===
The Apples changed their name to The Wallflowers and began playing clubs in Los Angeles, specifically on the Sunset Strip, such as the Whisky a Go Go, Gazzarri's, and the Viper Room. While they were playing clubs the band was also sending their demo tape to record companies and figures within the music industry. One of the tapes caught the attention of Andrew Slater, who would eventually become The Wallflowers' manager. Slater brought The Wallflowers to Virgin Records, who signed the band to a record contract. The Wallflowers then set out to make their first album. However, finding a producer who was willing to work with them proved to be difficult. The band was intent on recording live and few producers were willing to produce that way. Paul Fox eventually stepped in and agreed to produce the album. By the time The Wallflowers got into the studio in 1991, they had a small catalog of songs they had been performing live which they wanted to record for their debut album. All of the songs were written by Dylan with the rest of the band members contributing input on the music. When they were in the studio, the band were intent on using as little recording equipment as possible. Dylan said, "If I could have had it my way I would not have seen a microphone or a cable anywhere." When it came to recording, the songs were drawn out past the 3 to 4 minute norm; many songs were close to 5 minutes in length with two exceeding 7 minutes. The Wallflowers finished recording and released their self-titled debut album on August 25, 1992. After the release they began touring nationwide as an opening act for bands such as Spin Doctors and 10,000 Maniacs.

The Wallflowers continued to tour through the first half of 1993 but despite this sales of the album were slow. In total, 40,000 copies were sold. Reviews for the album, however, were mostly positive. Rolling Stone gave the album 4 stars calling it, "one sweet debut" and describing Dylan's songwriting as "impressive." Great reviews notwithstanding, executives at Virgin Records were reportedly not pleased with the album's lack of commercial success. Around that time, the company was going through a shift in management which led to the removal of Jeff Ayeroff and Jordan Harris, the two people who initially brought The Wallflowers to Virgin. After Ayeroff and Harris left the company The Wallflowers began to feel that they had no future with Virgin and asked to be released from their contract. The split with Virgin has been regarded as mutual. By mid-1993 The Wallflowers were without a record label.

After leaving Virgin, The Wallflowers went back to playing Los Angeles clubs in hopes of getting signed with another label. The band found it difficult to even get label representatives to come to their shows. In the year it took to get another record deal The Wallflowers gained and lost several band members. Bass player Barrie Maguire was asked to leave for undisclosed reasons in early 1993. The Wallflowers continued playing shows with replacement bass player Jimmie Snider until May 1993 when the band hired Greg Richling. Dylan and Richling went to high school together. The Wallflowers continued to play club shows in Los Angeles through early 1994 when drummer Peter Yanowitz left the band to join his girlfriend Natalie Merchant's band. Yanowitz brought in Barrie Maguire to help record Merchant's debut solo album, Tigerlily. Around the time of Yanowitz's departure,The Wallflowers caught the attention of Jimmy Iovine and Tom Whalley of Interscope Records, who then signed the band to their label in 1994.

=== 1995–1998: Bringing Down the Horse ===
After signing with Interscope Records, The Wallflowers began preparations for their second album, Bringing Down the Horse. They again had trouble finding a producer that was willing to work with them. The Wallflowers began sending demo tapes to producers and one of the tapes landed in the hands of T Bone Burnett. Burnett was impressed by the songs and agreed to produce the band. However, just as they were getting ready to record, the band's guitarist Tobi Miller quit. This left The Wallflowers without a permanent drummer or guitarist while they were in the studio. Matt Chamberlain filled in on drums throughout the recording sessions and several guitarists were brought in to fill Miller's role including Mike Campbell, Fred Tackett, Jay Joyce, and Michael Ward, who later became a permanent member of The Wallflowers.

The Wallflowers released Bringing Down the Horse on May 21, 1996. The band began touring for the album soon after the release. Album sales were slow to start but after the first single, "6th Avenue Heartache" (featuring Adam Duritz of Counting Crows) was released on August 19, interest in The Wallflowers began picking up as the song began getting more radio play. The music video for "6th Avenue Heartache" directed by David Fincher was receiving attention on MTV and VH1. The Wallflowers continued to tour through the rest of 1996 and were featured as a musical guest on Saturday Night Live that November. On December 1, Bringing Down the Horse received Gold certification from the RIAA by selling 500,000 copies of their album. In January 1997, The Wallflowers were nominated for two Grammy Awards, both for "6th Avenue Heartache". Dylan was a presenter at the 1997 Grammy Awards though he and The Wallflowers did not win either of the awards they were nominated for.

The band continued to tour and gain popularity. In February 1997, The Wallflowers completed a tour opening for Sheryl Crow before beginning a string of their own headlining shows beginning at the end of February and running through May. On February 24, the second single from Bringing Down the Horse, "One Headlight", was released. "One Headlight" received heavy radio play, which propelled Bringing Down the Horse to Platinum certification on March 4 by selling one million copies of the album. Within six weeks, sales for Bringing Down the Horse doubled and on April 16, the album received Double-Platinum status by selling two million copies. In mid-May, The Wallflowers crossed over to Europe for a three-week-long tour. Upon return in mid-June, The Wallflowers continued to tour the United States. On June 12, Dylan received his first Rolling Stone magazine cover. In the accompanying interview, Dylan spoke both candidly and at length about his lineage for the first time. Five days later, album sales for Bringing Down the Horse reached the three million mark, qualifying the album for Triple-Platinum status. On June 21, The Wallflowers co-headlined a festival at Texas Motor Speedway called Rock Fest. The day-long festival drew upwards of 400,000 people, making it one of the largest concerts in US history.

On July 2, 1997, The Wallflowers kicked off a co-headlining tour with Counting Crows that continued through September and the tour included opening acts by Bettie Serveert, Engine 88, Gigolo Aunts, and That Dog, with each opening band touring for a three-week stretch. The Wallflowers took over full-headlining duties for several shows in July when Counting Crows were unable to perform due to Duritz's swollen vocal cords. On September 22, The Wallflowers released their third single from Bringing Down the Horse, "The Difference". On October 30, Bringing Down the Horse hit another milestone by receiving Quadruple-Platinum status by selling four million copies. After taking the month of October off from touring, The Wallflowers hit the road again in November. On November 9 and 10, The Wallflowers broke from their headlining tour to open for the Rolling Stones at Dodger Stadium in Los Angeles. Less than a week later, The Wallflowers again broke from their tour to co-headline a private show at an arena in San Jose, California with Bob Dylan on November 14. The Wallflowers continued to tour through the end of December. By the end of 1997, Bringing Down the Horse had become the most played album on rock radio and peaked at Number 4 on the Billboard 200 while "One Headlight" had received some 209,000 radio spins across all formats.

On January 6, 1998, The Wallflowers received three Grammy nominations; "One Headlight" and "The Difference" were both nominated for Best Rock Song while "One Headlight" received an additional nomination for Best Rock Performance by a Duo or Group with Vocal. At the 1998 Grammy Award ceremony on February 25, The Wallflowers received two Grammy Awards; "One Headlight" won for Best Rock Song as well as Best Rock Performance by a Duo or Group with Vocal. Despite the fact that Bringing Down the Horse was released nearly two years previously, The Wallflowers released an additional single from that album on March 23, "Three Marlenas". "Three Marlenas" would be the fourth and final single to be released from Bringing Down the Horse. By 1998, The Wallflowers had begun declining on the Billboard charts and receiving fewer spins on the radio. However, that changed when the soundtrack for the 1998 film Godzilla was released on May 19. The Wallflowers had recorded a version of David Bowie's "'Heroes'" which was chosen as the lead single for the soundtrack. The album peaked at No. 2 on the Billboard 200 and The Wallflowers' version of "'Heroes'" received heavy radio play. Though The Wallflowers did not tour in 1998 they did play a series of one-off shows including the Tibetan Freedom Concert in June at RFK Stadium in Washington, D.C. and the Bridge School Benefit in September in Mountain View, California, which was hosted by Neil Young and his wife Pegi.

=== 1999–2001: (Breach) ===
After taking a five-month break from writing and touring, The Wallflowers set out to make their third album, (Breach). Dylan was very diligent in the songwriting process; he rented a studio near his home and would routinely go there to write songs for the album. However, Dylan was not satisfied with the first batch of songs he came up with. He decided to scrap them and start over. The songs that did make it to the studio were considered to be far more personal than any of the songs The Wallflowers had released in the past. Dylan commented, "I think all my songs are personal, but I just made them a little more dense before, made 'em real thick so that I didn't feel exposed. A lot of younger writers do that. Before, I haven't really wanted anybody buying my records looking for information about myself or my family, but at this point, the group has a lot of people buying the records who aren't interested in that, so it gives me more freedom." By the end of 1999, The Wallflowers were ready to begin recording. The bulk of the album was recorded at Sunset Sound Recorders in Los Angeles. The Wallflowers' longtime manager Andrew Slater co-produced the album with Michael Penn. The band took their time in the studio. Like Bringing Down the Horse, (Breach) took about eight months to record. (Breach) featured an array of guest artists including Elvis Costello, Mike Campbell, and Frank Black.

(Breach) was released on October 10, 2000. The album was met with generally positive critical reception but underwhelming sales. Rolling Stone gave (Breach) four stars, calling the band "more muscular" than they used to be. However, (Breach) commercially floundered in comparison to its high-selling predecessor. The album peaked at No. 13 on the Billboard 200 and took almost a year to receive Gold certification, which is the highest certification (Breach) has received to date.

A month before the official release of (Breach), the album was leaked in its entirety to file-sharing giant Napster, where reportedly 25 million users had the opportunity to download and listen to The Wallflowers' third album. With regard to the impact of leaks for big recording artists, former Capitol Records senior vice president and general manager Lou Mann said: "For The Wallflowers or any major superstar band, the problems are major. In fact they're Herculean, because people already want it and you don't want to dilute your audience." Jakob Dylan also explained his feelings about (Breach) being leaked: "[Album sales are] one of the ways that we have of making a living really. It's not about record companies, it's not about people's right to trade, you know, it's also how we put food on the table."

Despite the disappointing release, The Wallflowers set out on another tour beginning in early October 2000. After one show in Atlanta on October 2, The Wallflowers traveled to New York to open for the Who for four nights at Madison Square Garden. Later in October 2000, Jakob Dylan was featured on the cover of Rolling Stone for a second time. The Wallflowers continued to tour throughout the U.S. through mid-December before heading to Japan in February 2001 for their first tour there.

The Wallflowers covered the Bee Gees' 1968 hit song "I Started a Joke" for the 2001 film, Zoolander. The band continued to tour the U.S. for the remainder of 2001 until it was announced in early October that guitarist Michael Ward had left The Wallflowers due to creative differences.

=== 2002–2003: Red Letter Days ===
In 2001, Jakob Dylan began writing for The Wallflowers' fourth album, Red Letter Days. Later that year while on tour with John Mellencamp, the band began recording using portable equipment. Some recording was also done at keyboardist Rami Jaffee's house. Once the band was finished touring for the year they began recording the bulk of the new record at Jackson Browne's studio in Santa Monica. By the time The Wallflowers had gotten into Browne's studio, Michael Ward had left the band, leaving them without a lead guitarist for the recording process. Dylan took on much of the lead guitar duties with Mike McCready, Rusty Anderson, and Val McCallum also contributing on guitar. Moe Z M.D., who had been touring with Mellencamp, contributed additional percussion and background vocals to the album. Red Letter Days was produced by founding Wallflowers member Tobi Miller along with Bill Appleberry. Recording continued through the new year and was completed on April 12, 2002. The album was mixed by Tom Lord-Alge, who had mixed the band's previous two albums. Mixing was completed on May 15, 2002.

While The Wallflowers worked on Red Letter Days, they recorded a cover of The Beatles' 1965 song "I'm Looking Through You" for the soundtrack to the 2001 film I Am Sam. The soundtrack was released on January 8, 2002. The first single from the Red Letter Days, "When You're On Top," was released to radio on August 16, 2002. A music video directed by Marc Webb was next. After a few false starts, Red Letter Days was released on November 5, 2002. The album was met with mixed to positive reviews. Many critics noted the harder rock sound and catchy melodies used throughout the album. Commercial performance was relatively mixed as well, peaking at No.32 on the Billboard 200. Around the time Red Letter Days was released, The Wallflowers embarked on a monthlong U.S. tour ending in December. After another U.S. tour in January 2003, The Wallflowers toured in several European countries in February including Spain, Italy, Germany, and Great Britain. After the tour, The Wallflowers' drummer since 1995, Mario Calire announced he was parting ways with the band.

In 2003, The Wallflowers were featured on the soundtrack for the film American Wedding. The band recorded a cover of Van Morrison's 1970 song "Into the Mystic". The film's music department weren't able to secure the licensing rights to use Morrison's version so they enlisted The Wallflowers to cover the song. Both versions of the song however, were featured in the film.

=== 2004–2005: Rebel, Sweetheart ===
In July 2004, The Wallflowers began to record their fifth album, Rebel, Sweetheart. This time the band decided to record in Atlanta, where their producer for the album, Brendan O'Brien, is based. O'Brien also contributed on guitar. Fred Eltringham joined The Wallflowers as their drummer. Jakob Dylan wrote the songs and keyboardist Rami Jaffee said, "What I did notice is that kind of upbeat song with some pretty scary lyrics." Dylan painted the album's cover art himself.

On October 14, 2004, Enjoy Every Sandwich: The Songs of Warren Zevon, a Warren Zevon tribute album, was released. The Wallflowers covered Zevon's 1978 song "Lawyers, Guns and Money on it." In promotion of the album, The Wallflowers performed "Lawyers, Guns and Money" on the Late Show with David Letterman with Zevon's son, Jordan, on October 12, 2004. On October 31, 2004, The Wallflowers were flown via military transport plane to the USS John C. Stennis aircraft carrier in the middle of the Pacific Ocean to perform for the returning troops.

Rebel, Sweetheart was released on May 24, 2005, and was met with positive reviews. Despite widespread critical acclaim, Rebel, Sweetheart performed relatively poorly commercially, peaking at No. 40 on the Billboard 200. However, the first single from the album, "The Beautiful Side of Somewhere", hit No. 5 on AAA radio. The second single was "God Says Nothing Back". That was the first Wallflowers album to be released on DualDisc. On one side was the album,and on the other was a DVD that included exclusive performances and arrangements of some of the band's songs, as well as an interview with comedian Jon Lovitz. In promoting the album, The Wallflowers performed concerts for the Oxygen Custom Concert Series and PBS Soundstage. Around the time of the album's release, the band began their last tour for at least two years. They were joined by Stuart Mathis on lead guitar. After 2005, The Wallflowers ended their relationship with Interscope Records.

=== 2006–2010: Hiatus ===
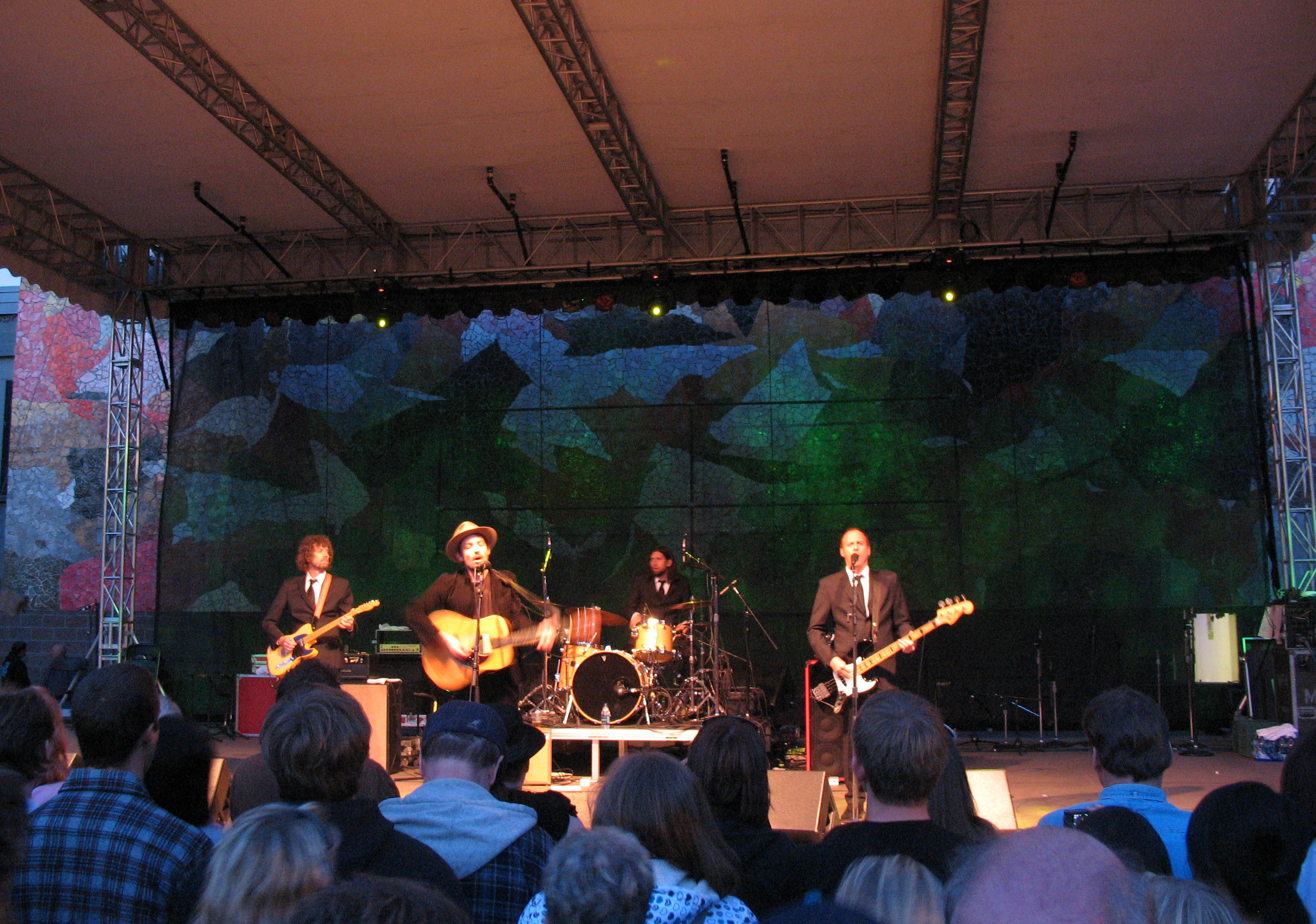
The band performing at 2008 Bumbershoot in Seattle

2006 was the first year in over a decade that The Wallflowers did not tour. Instead, band members embarked on other projects. Jakob Dylan toured with former Wallflowers producer T-Bone Burnett in the early summer, performing a solo acoustic opening set with a keyboard player. Later that year, he signed a contract with Columbia Records as a solo artist. He also wrote and recorded a song called "Here Comes Now", which was the theme song for the ABC television drama Six Degrees. The show premiered in the fall of 2006. Meanwhile, keyboardist Rami Jaffee joined the Foo Fighters as a touring and session member. Jaffee had previously contributed keyboards to the Foo Fighters' 2005 album In Your Honor. In 2006, he performed on albums for Willie Nile and Pete Yorn.

On August 31, 2007, The Wallflowers announced they would be touring for the first time in over two years. They toured in the Midwest and Northeastern U.S. in October and November. Before the tour, Jaffee announced that he was leaving The Wallflowers. That left Dylan, Greg Richling, and Fred Eltringham as the remaining members and a guitar player, Stuart Mathis, as a touring member. In 2008, The Wallflowers toured on-and-off throughout the summer. Touring for The Wallflowers was limited as Dylan had released his first solo album, Seeing Things, on June 10, 2008. Eltringham joined Dylan on tour in promotion for the album.

On March 31, 2009, The Wallflowers released a greatest-hits album called Collected: 1996–2005. The album featured every single released from the four albums The Wallflowers released between 1996 and 2005. It contained several non-single songs from those four albums, a demo version of "God Says Nothing Back" and an unreleased song called "Eat You Sleeping". In the summer of 2009, The Wallflowers embarked on a U.S. tour in support of the album. In addition to Dylan, Richling, Eltringham and Mathis, Bill Appleberry joined the band on the tour as a keyboard player. The Wallflowers did not tour in 2010 as Dylan had released his second solo album, Women + Country, on April 6, 2010, and was touring in support of the album.

=== 2011–2012: Glad All Over ===
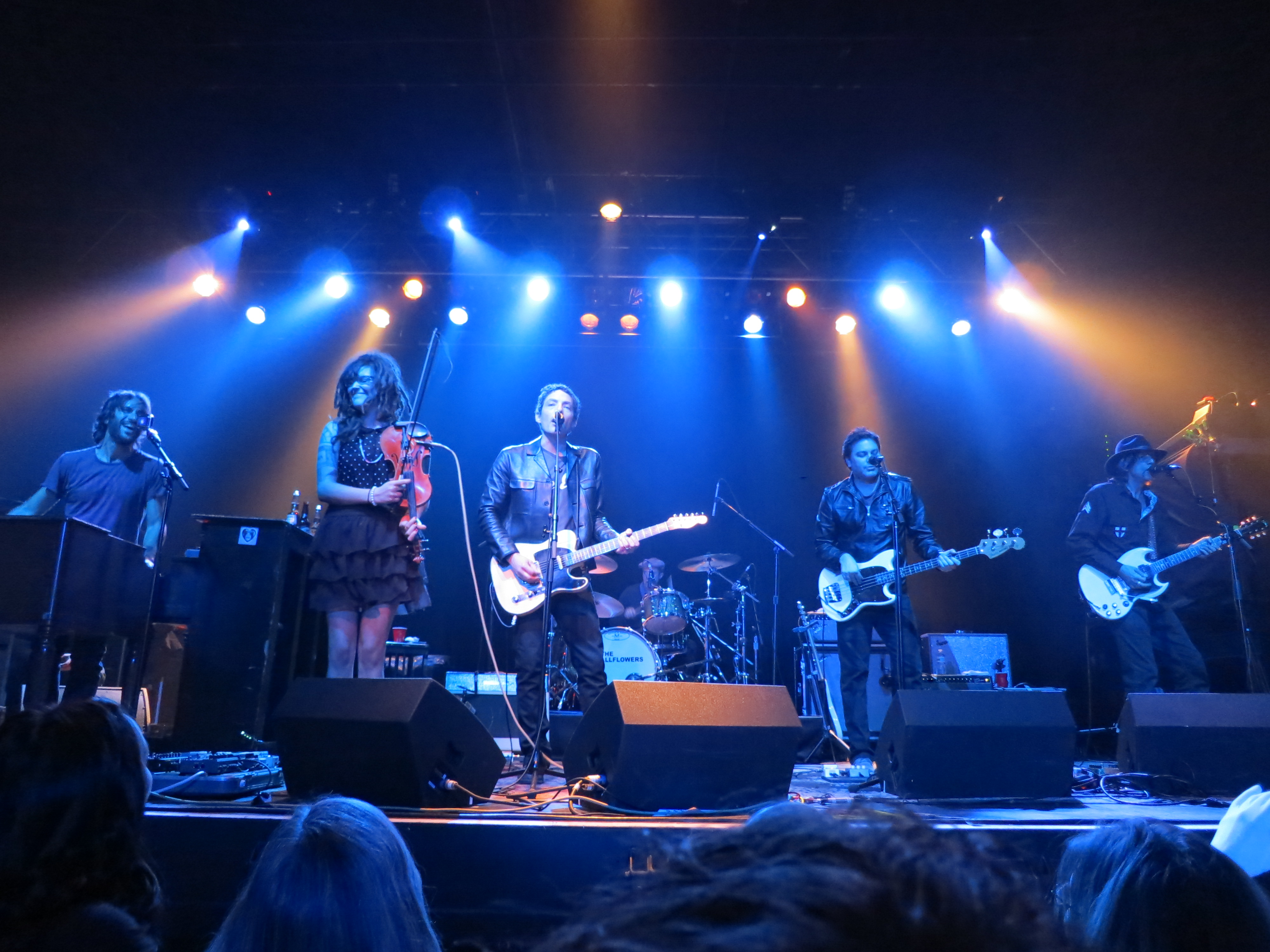
The Wallflowers in 2012

On November 1, 2011, Jakob Dylan announced that The Wallflowers would be reuniting to release an album, explaining: "I never suggested we were breaking up. We all felt we were losing the plot a bit and we needed a break... that year break becomes two years, then becomes three years, and before you know it five or six years go by pretty quickly. I can't do what I do in The Wallflowers without them. I miss it." In an interview with the St. Joseph News-Press, Dylan said that The Wallflowers would be getting into the studio in January and the lineup would include Greg Richling on bass, Rami Jaffee on keys, Stuart Mathis on guitar and Fred Eltringham on drums. However, weeks before The Wallflowers began recording, Eltringham left the band to pursue other projects. The band quickly got former Red Hot Chili Peppers and Pearl Jam drummer Jack Irons to join the band. Irons was previously involved in a side project with Richling, the Wallflowers bassist.

On January 20, 2012, The Wallflowers began recording their sixth studio album, Glad All Over, at the Black Keys' Dan Auerbach's Easy Eye studio in Nashville. Jay Joyce, who had played guitar on The Wallflowers' Bringing Down the Horse agreed to produce the album. Before recording in the studio, the band had decided have a more collaborative writing process than they had in the past. Instead of Dylan bringing in fully completed songs like he had done in the past, he only brought lyrics. Dylan and the rest of the band wrote the music for the songs together in the studio. Joyce explained: "Jakob came to Nashville and we sat down and I asked him to play me a song, but instead he pulled out this 2-inch-thick notebook. ‘This is what I’ve got. Let’s play some grooves and throw it around.’ I thought, ‘Wow, that’s kind of scary, but it’s exciting.’ So we didn't really know going in what we were going to do. We had no songs, no demos. It was all developed in the studio. The band finished recording on February 20, 2012.

At a private solo performance in New York on April 19, 2012, Dylan announced that the new The Wallflowers album was expected to be released in fall later that year. On July 14, 2012, the band announced that the title of their new album would be Glad All Over. They also announced that the album's first single, "Reboot the Mission", would be available for free download from their website. After several one-off shows in the summer of 2012, The Wallflowers kicked off a fall tour in San Diego on September 8, 2012. From there, they continued to tour the U.S. and Canada through mid-November, playing a mix of clubs and festivals, with an additional four East Coast dates at the end of December.Glad All Over was released on October 9, 2012, on Columbia Records and was met with generally positive reviews. Leading up to the album's release, The Wallflowers promoted the album on various television shows including Good Morning America, Late Night with Jimmy Fallon, The Tonight Show with Jay Leno, the Late Show with David Letterman, and Ellen.

=== 2013–2020: Tours and roster changes ===
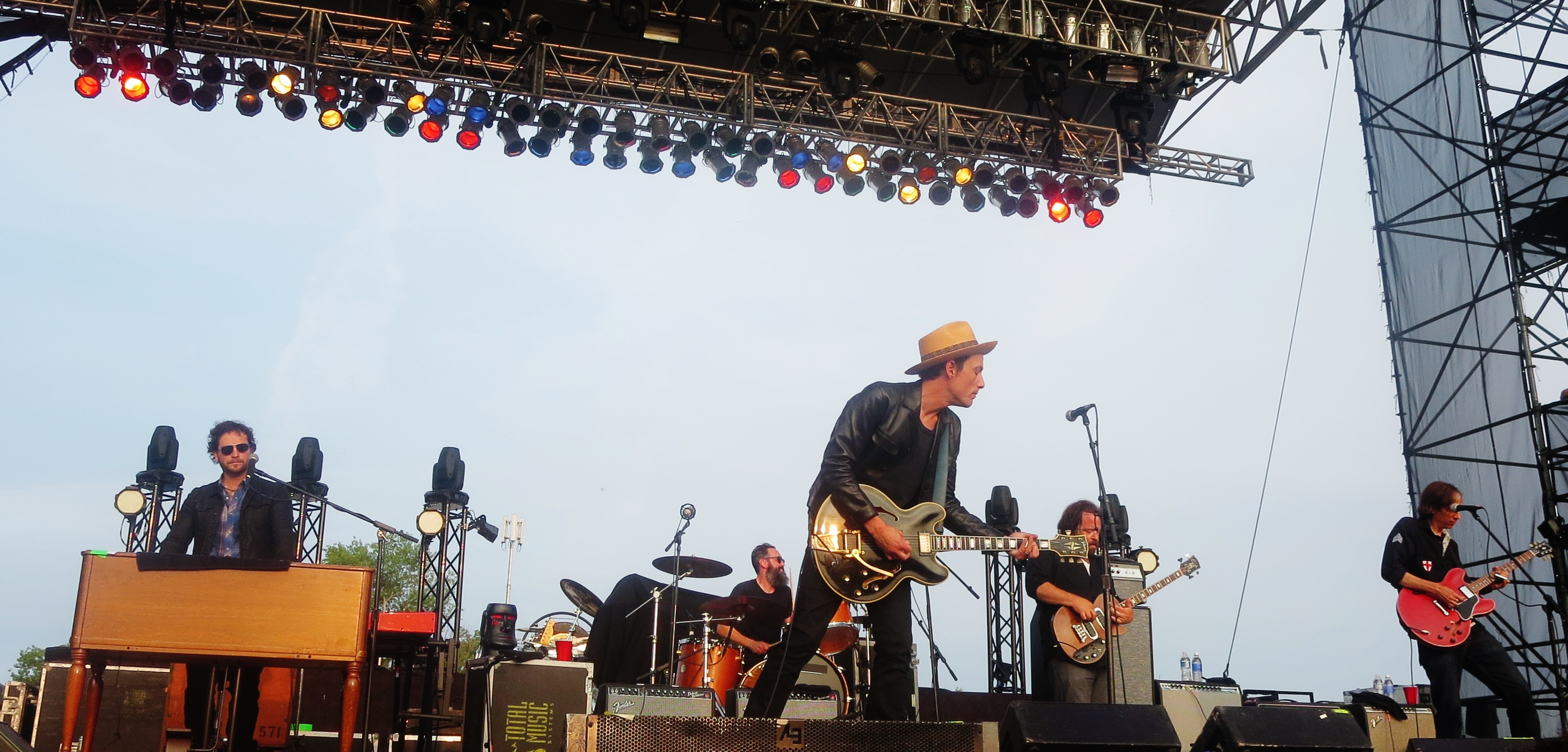
The Wallflowers perform in Walker, Minnesota, July 2014

Beginning in the spring of 2013, the band toured with Eric Clapton on his arena tour. The tour with Clapton began on March 14, 2013, in Phoenix at the US Airways Center and continued through the South and East Coast, concluding on April 6, 2013, in Pittsburgh at the Consol Energy Center.

After the Clapton tour, The Wallflowers played several additional shows of their own in May 2013. On May 12 in Napa, California, the band's longtime keyboardist Rami Jaffee played what would be his final show with The Wallflowers to date. Although no official announcement was made, Jaffee has not appeared with the group again, and became an official member of the Foo Fighters in June 2017. Jimmy Wallace subbed in his spot for the remaining dates of 2013, and played regularly with the band up until 2019. The Wallflowers continued to tour through the summer of 2013 and played their final show of the summer on August 17 at the River Roots Live Festival in Davenport, Iowa, to a crowd of 17,000 people. The show was longtime bassist Greg Richling's and drummer Jack Irons' final show with the band. On September 8, Richling officially announced that he was leaving The Wallflowers after 20 years with the band. Irons announced he was leaving soon after, on September 15. Irons reportedly left to focus on his band project, Arthur Channel, a group he had put together with Greg Richling in 2009, prior to Irons joining The Wallflowers in 2012. Arthur Channel released their debut album on October 15, 2013.

Since 2013, the Wallflowers have performed with a drummer, bass player, guitar player, and keyboardist filling in for Irons, Richling, Mathis, and Jaffee. Dylan said later he would continue making music under the name The Wallflowers as a solo project: "The Wallflowers is me, and if I go under my own name, it's me. It's the same thing, ultimately. It's really dictated on the songs I have and how I want to record them and would they sound better with a full-band sound. In many ways it's the same person. It's just what outfit do I want to put on." For 2017, the touring lineup consisted of Stanton Adcock on lead guitar, Steve Mackey on bass, keyboardist Jimmy Wallace, and Lynn Williams on drums.

In May 2016, The Wallflowers' 1996 album Bringing Down the Horse was issued on vinyl for the first time in honor of the 20th anniversary of the album's release. The Wallflowers was among hundreds of artists whose material was destroyed in the 2008 Universal fire, although later research showed the master tapes for Bringing Down the Horse were not destroyed in the fire. The band was set to undertake a North American summer tour in 2020 alongside Matchbox Twenty prior to the COVID-19 pandemic.

=== 2021–present: Exit Wounds ===
The band's seventh studio album, Exit Wounds, was released on July 9, 2021 on New West Records. With the release of the album, Dylan reiterated that the band's sound is an extension of his solo work, saying "There's never been one lineup that's made two records. So the constant is myself. If you think there's a sound of The Wallflowers, I'm making that with my choices in the studio and with my songs and voice." It was produced by Butch Walker, and the band announced a 53-date arena tour to promote the album (which was postponed to 2022 due to the COVID-19 pandemic). About writing the album, Dylan stated, "I was just also writing during a time when the world felt like it was falling apart. That changes the way you address even the simplest things, because you have panic in your mind all the time. You have anxiety... you also have hope... it’s all in there." The album was well received and scored the band their highest position on a Billboard albums chart, with the album debuting at No. 3 on Billboard's Top Album Sales Chart. The band promoted the new album with a number of television appearances, debuting their new single on Jimmy Kimmel Live! on April 8, 2021, in addition to performances on Good Morning America, The Late Show with Stephen Colbert, and other network television shows.

The band's planned 2022 tour with Matchbox Twenty, which had already been postponed from 2020, was postponed again until 2023 due to scheduling conflicts. The band scheduled their own headlining tour in North America, announcing initial dates in April 2022, continuing to tour into 2023, with many sold out shows. On October 14, 2023, Jakob Dylan and former Wallflowers guitarist Michael Ward reunited for the first time in over 20 years in Las Vegas with Dylan being a surprise guest at Ward's show, joining him for "One Headlight." On April 1, 2024, Ward died due to complications of diabetes. The band paid tribute to him on their Facebook on April 3, 2024.

On May 7, 2024, the band announced they would perform Bringing Down the Horse live in its entirety for the first time at a special show at the Palace Theater on October 2 in Los Angeles.

In 2026, the band celebrated the 30th anniversary of their 1996 album, Bringing Down The Horse, by embarking on a year-long North America and European tour. Each concert features the album played its entirety, as well as Tom Petty and the Heartbreakers' 1982 album Long After Dark.

== Band members ==
Current members

- Jakob Dylan – lead vocals, rhythm guitar (1989–present)

Touring musicians

- Chris Masterson – guitars, backing vocals (2024–present)
- Aaron Embry - keyboards, backing vocals (2021–present)
- Whynot Jansveld - bass, backing vocals (2021–present)
- Ben Peeler - guitars, backing vocals (2000–2001, 2021–present)
- Mark Stepro - drums, backing vocals (2021–present)

Former members

- Tobi Miller – lead guitar, backing vocals (1989–1995)
- Barrie Maguire – bass, backing vocals (1989–1993)
- Peter Yanowitz – drums, percussion, backing vocals (1990–1994)
- Rami Jaffee – keyboards, backing vocals, vibraphone (1990–2005, 2012–2013)
- Greg Richling – bass, backing vocals, percussion, synthesizer (1993–2013)
- Mario Calire – drums, backing vocals (1995–2003, 2013)
- Michael Ward – lead guitar, backing vocals (1995–2001; died 2024)
- Fred Eltringham – drums, percussion, backing vocals (2003–2011)
- Stuart Mathis – lead guitar, backing vocals (2005–2014)
- Jack Irons – drums, percussion (2012–2013)

Former touring musicians

- Stanton Edward – guitars, backing vocals (2017–2023)
- Jimmy Wallace – keyboards, vocals (2013–2019)
- Steve Mackey – bass (2017–2019)
- Lynn Williams – drums, percussion (2017–2019)
- Moe Z M.D. – keyboards, percussion, backing vocals (2002–2003)
- Yogi Lonich – lead guitar, backing vocals (2002–2003)
- Brandon Walters – lead guitar (2021)

== Discography ==
Studio albums

- The Wallflowers (1992)
- Bringing Down the Horse (1996)
- (Breach) (2000)
- Red Letter Days (2002)
- Rebel, Sweetheart (2005)
- Glad All Over (2012)
- Exit Wounds (2021)
