= Women + Country =

Studio album by Jakob Dylan
- Released: April 6, 2010
- Length: 42:46
- Label: Columbia
- Producer: T Bone Burnett

Jakob Dylan chronology
Seeing Things (2008)	Women + Country (2010)

Women + Country is singer-songwriter Jakob Dylan's second solo studio album. The album was released by Columbia Records on April 6, 2010, and produced by T Bone Burnett.

== Track listing ==
Professional ratings
Aggregate scores
Source	Rating
Metacritic	72/100
Review scores
Source	Rating
Allmusic	4/5 stars
American Songwriter	4/5 stars
Billboard	4/5 stars
Consequence of Sound	B
Entertainment Weekly	B
Los Angeles Times	2.5/4 stars
MusicOMH	4/5 stars
Paste	72/100
PopMatters	6/10
Rolling Stone	3/5 stars

All tracks are written by Jakob Dylan.

Women + Country track listing
No.	Title	Length
1.	"Nothing But the Whole Wide World"	3:48
2.	"Down on Our Own Shield"	3:40
3.	"Lend a Hand"	3:48
4.	"We Don't Live Here Anymore"	4:23
5.	"Everybody's Hurting"	3:40
6.	"Yonder Come the Blues"	4:01
7.	"Holy Rollers for Love"	3:55
8.	"Truth for a Truth"	3:35
9.	"They've Trapped Us Boys"	4:01
10.	"Smile When You Call Me That"	3:59
11.	"Standing Eight Count"	3:56
Total length:		42:46

== Personnel ==
- Jakob Dylan – guitar, vocals
- T Bone Burnett – bass, guitar, producer
- Neko Case – backing vocals
- Kelly Hogan – backing vocals
- Paul Ackling – equipment technician, guitar technician
- Jay Bellerose – drums, percussion
- George Bohanon – horn, trombone
- Christian Calabró – design
- Josh Cheuse – art direction, design
- Keefus Ciancia – keyboards
- Dennis Crouch – bass
- Emile Kelman – assistant engineer
- François Lardeau – engineer
- Greg Leisz – guitar, pedal steel
- Darrell Leonard – horn arrangements, trumpet
- Gavin Lurssen – mastering
- David Mansfield – banjo, fiddle, mandolin
- James Minchin III – photography
- Jessica C. Mitchell – assistant
- Ira Nepus – trombone
- Mike Piersante – engineer, mixing
- Marc Ribot – guitar
- Ivy Skoff – production coordination
- Maurice Spears – trombone
- Jason Wormer – editing, engineer

== Charts ==
Chart performance of Women + Country
Chart (2010)	Peak position
German Albums (Offizielle Top 100)	68
Italian Albums (FIMI)	87
Swedish Albums (Sverigetopplistan)	55
Swiss Albums (Schweizer Hitparade)	48
US Billboard 200	12
US Top Rock Albums (Billboard)	2
