= Red Letter Days (album) =

2002 studio album by the Wallflowers

Studio album by The Wallflowers
- Released: November 5, 2002
- Recorded: 2001 – April 12, 2002
- Studio: Groovemasters (Santa Monica, California); Sound City (Los Angeles); Record One (Los Angeles)
- Genre: Rock
- Length: 49:28
- Label: Interscope
- Producer: Tobias Miller, Bill Appleberry

The Wallflowers chronology
(Breach) (2000)	Red Letter Days (2002)	Rebel, Sweetheart (2005)

Singles from Red Letter Days
- 1. "When You're On Top" Released: 2002; 2. "If You Never Got Sick" Released: 2003

Professional ratings
Aggregate scores
Source	Rating
Metacritic	63/100
Review scores
Source	Rating
Allmusic	4/5 stars
Rolling Stone	3/5 stars

Red Letter Days is the fourth album by The Wallflowers, released by Interscope Records on November 5, 2002. The band's first guitarist, Tobi Miller, served as the album's producer alongside Bill Appleberry.

The album was met with moderate critical and commercial reception, peaking at number 32 on the Billboard 200. Despite featuring some profanity (heard in "Everybody Out of the Water"), Red Letter Days does not carry a Parental Advisory sticker.

== Background ==
The album peaked at number 32 on the Billboard 200. Red Letter Days was the first Wallflowers record that featured Jakob Dylan playing a majority of the lead guitar parts. The album had a much more aggressive sound than any of their previous releases, especially the song "Everybody Out of the Water," which they performed on The Late Late Show with Craig Kilborn. One music video was shot for the album's first single, "When You're On Top."

By May 2005, Red Letter Days had sold 208,000 copies, according to Nielsen Soundscan.

After years of fetching hundreds of dollars for an original pressing on the open market, Red Letter Days was reissued on LP for its 15th anniversary on November 3, 2017.

== Reception ==
The album received a score of 63 out of 100 from Metacritic, indicating "generally positive reviews." Rolling Stone called it "a straightforward barnburner of an album" while Mojo commented that "The Wallflowers make some of the best radio-friendly hooks and melodies around." In retrospect, singer Jakob Dylan has mixed feelings about the album. He told Uproxx that "That record is difficult for me to listen to. I don’t think it sounds as good as the other records. There’s a sheen to that record that confuses me...I do like the songs on it quite a bit and I play some of those songs still. But as a record, I feel like we may have veered off the path a little bit."

== Track listing ==
All songs written by Jakob Dylan

1. "When You're on Top" – 3:54
2. "How Good It Can Get" – 4:11
3. "Closer to You" – 3:17
4. "Everybody Out of the Water" – 3:42
5. "Three Ways" – 4:19
6. "Too Late to Quit" – 3:54
7. "If You Never Got Sick" – 3:44
8. "Health and Happiness" – 4:03
9. "See You When I Get There" – 3:09
10. "Feels Like Summer Again" – 3:48
11. "Everything I Need" – 3:37
12. "Here in Pleasantville" – 4:10
13. "Empire in My Mind" (hidden track) – 3:32

Japanese bonus tracks

14. "Empire in My Mind" (Original version)
15. "(What's So Funny 'Bout) Peace, Love, and Understanding" (Nick Lowe)

== Other media ==
"Everybody Out of the Water" has been used in an episode of CSI: Crime Scene Investigation, and "The Empire in My Mind" was the main theme of the television series The Guardian for its second and third seasons.

== Personnel ==
Personnel adapted from Red Letter Days liner notes

The Wallflowers

- Mario Calire – drums, backing vocals
- Jakob Dylan – lead and backing vocals, guitars
- Rami Jaffee – keyboards, vibes
- Greg Richling – bass guitar, Mini-Moog

Additional personnel

- Rusty Anderson – Guitar
- Jamie Caliri – Art direction, packaging, photography
- David Campbell – String arrangements
- Lenny Castro – Percussion
- Marina Chavez – Cover photo
- Ed Churney – Mixing
- Femio Hernández – Assistant engineer
- Courtney Kaiser – Background vocals
- Ken Kraus – Legal advisor
- Bill Lane – Engineer, engineering consultant
- Tom Lord-Alge – Mixing
- Stephen Marcussen – Mastering
- Val McCallum – Guitar
- Mike McCready – Guitar
- Moe Z M.D. – Background vocals
- Ben Peeler – Lap steel guitar
- Dave Reed – Engineer
- Bob Salcedo – Engineer
- Louie Teran – Editing
- Darrell Thorp – Assistant engineer
- Rich Tosi – Assistant engineer
- Robert Vosgien – Mastering
- Miles Wilson – Assistant engineer
- Ed Wong – Studio technician

== Charts ==
Chart (2002)	Peak position
US Billboard 200	32
