= Rebel, Sweetheart =

Studio album by The Wallflowers
- Released: May 24, 2005
- Recorded: July 2004–2005
- Studios: Southern Tracks Recording in Atlanta Georgia, additional recording at Henson Recording Studios in Hollywood California
- Genres: Alternative rock, roots rock
- Length: 49:50
- Label: Interscope
- Producer: Brendan O'Brien

The Wallflowers chronology
Red Letter Days (2002)	Rebel, Sweetheart (2005)	Collected: 1996–2005 (2009)

Singles from Rebel, Sweetheart
- 1. "The Beautiful Side of Somewhere" Released: 2005; 2. "God Says Nothing Back" Released: 2005

Professional ratings
Aggregate scores
Source	Rating
Metacritic	73/100
Review scores
Source	Rating
Allmusic	4/5 stars
PopMatters	7/10 stars
Rolling Stone	3.5/5 stars

Rebel, Sweetheart is the fifth studio album by American rock band the Wallflowers, released on May 24, 2005, by Interscope Records. It debuted and peaked at number 40 on the Billboard 200, and served as the band's final release with Interscope. Its lead single, "The Beautiful Side of Somewhere", peaked at number five on Billboard's Adult Alternative Airplay chart. Reviews of the album by music critics were sparse, but generally positive.

The album has sold approximately 116,000 copies, according to Billboard and Nielsen Soundscan.

== Reception ==
The album received a score of 73 out of 100 on Metacritic, indicating "generally positive reviews." In a positive review, Allmusic wrote "not that Rebel, Sweetheart offers anything all that different from previous Wallflowers albums -- they just do what they do better than they have before." RollingStone magazine also praised the album, writing "Dylan sings these adult tales of disillusionment and perseverance with the gritty timbre of a young Warren Zevon" while naming "Here He Comes (Confessions of a Drunken Marionette)" as the standout track on the album. Other reviews were less positive, with Uncut magazine giving it 6 out of 10 stars and calling it "accomplished but seldom inspired."

In an interview with Uproxx in 2021, Dylan fondly remembered recording the album with Brendan O'Brien and said he still likes the album "quite a bit." He commented that "sonically, it sounds very similar to those Bruce Springsteen records that Brendan was making at the time"

== Track listing ==
All songs written by Jakob Dylan.

1. "Days of Wonder" – 5:14
2. "The Passenger" – 2:54
3. "The Beautiful Side of Somewhere" – 4:00
4. "Here He Comes (Confessions of a Drunken Marionette)" – 3:41
5. "We're Already There" – 4:37
6. "God Says Nothing Back" – 4:47
7. "Back to California" – 3:35
8. "I Am a Building" – 3:47
9. "From the Bottom of My Heart" – 6:12
10. "Nearly Beloved" – 4:00
11. "How Far You've Come" – 3:26
12. "All Things New Again" – 3:45

British bonus track

13. "Just One Breath Away" – 4:16

Japanese bonus track

13. "Nothing to See Here" – 3:40

== Personnel ==
Personnel adapted from Rebel, Sweetheart liner notes

The Wallflowers

- Jakob Dylan – guitars, lead vocals
- Fred Eltringham – drums, percussion, backing vocals
- Rami Jaffee – keyboards
- Greg Richling – bass guitar, backing vocals

Additional personnel

- Brendan O'Brien – production, guitar, backing vocals
- Lenny Castro – percussion

== Charts ==
Chart (2005)	Peak position
US Billboard 200	40
