= Glad All Over (The Wallflowers album) =

Studio album by The Wallflowers
- Released: October 9, 2012
- Recorded: January 20 – February 20, 2012 at Easy Eye Studio
- Genre: Alternative rock
- Length: 36:26
- Label: Columbia
- Producer: Jay Joyce

The Wallflowers chronology
Collected: 1996–2005 (2009)	Glad All Over (2012)	Exit Wounds (2021)

Singles from Glad All Over
- 1. "Reboot the Mission" Released: July 24, 2012; 2. "Love Is a Country" Released: October 1, 2012

Glad All Over is the sixth studio album for American alternative rock band The Wallflowers. It was released in October 2012 by Columbia Records, and charted at No. 48.

The band revealed the title of the album on July 12, 2012, and they released their first single, "Reboot the Mission" for free on July 24, 2012.

On October 1, 2012, it was announced on the band's website that "Love Is a Country" would be the second single.

== Reception ==
The album received a score of 73 out of 100 from Metacritic, indicating generally positive reviews. In a positive review, AllMusic wrote that "The Wallflowers don't abandon their identity as rock & roll classicists, they just now feel the freedom to mess around, and they've come up with one of their loosest, liveliest records that not-so-coincidentally is one of their best."

Nine years after the release of the record, Jakob Dylan told Uproxx that "it was a contentious record to make" and that tensions within the band led to it being a "disjointed" album. "Simply put, I don’t think the band was getting together that great when we got back together. So, you can hear it in the record," he said.

Professional ratings
Aggregate scores
Source	Rating
Metacritic	73/100
Review scores
Source	Rating
Allmusic	4/5 stars
Entertainment Weekly	B
Rolling Stone	3/5 stars
Consequence of Sound	3.5/5 stars
PopMatters	7/10 stars

== Track listing ==
All lyrics are written by Jakob Dylan; all music is composed by The Wallflowers.

No.	Title	Length
1.	"Hospital for Sinners"	3:05
2.	"Misfits and Lovers"	3:25
3.	"First One in the Car"	4:21
4.	"Reboot the Mission"	3:32
5.	"It's a Dream"	3:15
6.	"Love Is a Country"	3:54
7.	"Have Mercy on Him Now"	3:21
8.	"The Devil's Waltz"	3:06
9.	"It Won't Be Long (Till We're Not Wrong Anymore)"	3:38
10.	"Constellation Blues"	4:21
11.	"One Set of Wings"	3:28
12.	"Whole Wide World" (Wreckless Eric cover. Japan Bonus Track, wrongly listed as "Whole Live World")	3:20

== Personnel ==
The Wallflowers

- Jakob Dylan – lead vocals, rhythm guitar
- Jack Irons – drums, percussion
- Rami Jaffee – piano, organ, electric piano, keyboards
- Stuart Mathis – lead guitar, pedal steel guitar, backing vocals
- Greg Richling – bass guitar, backing vocals, percussion

Additional musician

- Mick Jones – guitar, backing vocals on "Misfits and Lovers" and "Reboot the Mission"
- Jay Joyce – guitar, backing vocals, percussion, production

== Charts ==
Chart performance for Glad All Over
Chart (2012)	Peak position
US Billboard 200	48
US Indie Store Album Sales (Billboard)	17
US Top Rock Albums (Billboard)	19

=== Singles ===
Single	Chart (2012)	Peak position
"Reboot the Mission"
"Reboot the Mission"	US Adult Alternative Songs (Billboard)	2
"Reboot the Mission"	US Hot Rock & Alternative Songs (Billboard)	43
