= Jakob Dylan =

American singer-songwriter (born 1969)

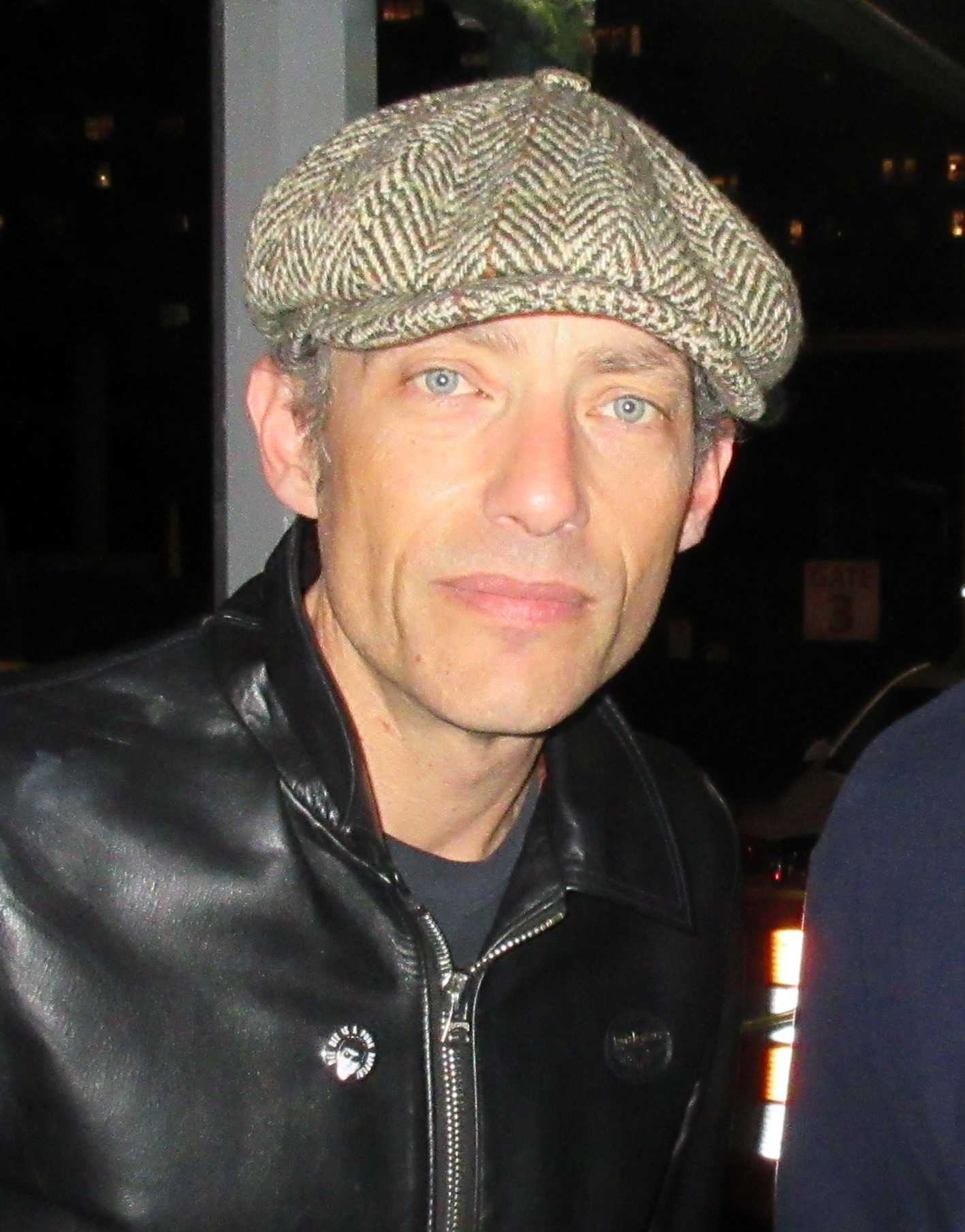
- Dylan in 2019

Background information
- Born: Jakob Luke Dylan; December 9, 1969 (age 56); New York City, U.S.
- Origin: Los Angeles, California, U.S.
- Genres: Rock; folk; Americana
- Occupation: Singer-songwriter
- Instruments: Vocals; guitar; piano; bass
- Years active: 1987–present
- Labels: Columbia; Interscope; Virgin
- Member of: The Wallflowers
- Spouses: Paige Dylan (m. 1992)
- Children: 4
- Parents: Bob Dylan (father); Sara Dylan (mother)
- Relatives: Jesse Dylan (brother)

Jakob Luke Dylan (born December 9, 1969) is an American singer-songwriter. He rose to fame as the lead vocalist, guitarist, and principal songwriter of the rock band the Wallflowers, which he formed in 1989.

Born in New York City to musician Bob Dylan and model Sara Lownds, Dylan began his musical career in various Indie bands before creating the Wallflowers. As its frontman and lead vocalist, he wrote and performed the band's hit songs including "One Headlight", "6th Avenue Heartache", "The Difference" and "Three Marlenas"—the former of which was included on Rolling Stone's list of the "100 Greatest Pop Songs", and won two Grammy Awards. With the Wallflowers, Dylan has released seven studio albums.

As a solo act, Dylan signed with Columbia Records to release two studio albums—Seeing Things (2008) and Women + Country (2010)—the latter of which peaked at number 12 on the Billboard 200.

== Early life ==
Dylan was born on December 9, 1969, in New York City to folk singer Bob Dylan (né Robert Zimmerman) and model Sara Lownds (née Shirley Noznisky). His parents are both of Jewish descent. Dylan spent the earliest years of his life in Greenwich Village. Around the age of three, he moved with his family to the Los Angeles area. Growing up, he listened to English rock records from his older brothers' record collection, including the Clash, the Jam, and Buzzcocks. Dylan was particularly impressed with the Clash, who inspired him to begin playing music himself.

During high school, Dylan played guitar in various bands; he was featured as a guitar player on his friends' band's eponymous 1987 album, Trash Matinee. Dylan was also in a band called the Bootheels at the time with future Wallflowers bandmate Tobi Miller. During this time, Dylan started writing songs and began shifting his focus from guitar playing to songwriting. Upon graduation from high school, however, Dylan decided to move back to New York City to attend Parsons School of Design to study art. Dylan dropped out in his first semester and returned to Los Angeles to pursue music.

== Career ==
=== 1989–2005: The Wallflowers ===
Upon moving back to Los Angeles, Dylan and childhood friend Tobi Miller formed a new band called the Apples around 1989, along with Luther Russell on bass guitar and Aaron A. Brooks on drums. Both Russell and Brooks later departed to start their own respective bands. Dylan and Miller then recruited Barrie Maguire on bass, Peter Yanowitz on drums, and Rami Jaffee on keyboards to fill out the new band. The Apples changed their name to The Wallflowers and began playing clubs in Los Angeles. They were eventually signed to Virgin Records, and in 1991, The Wallflowers began recording their debut album. Dylan wrote the songs and the album was recorded live in the studio with minimal to no overdubbing. The Wallflowers' eponymous debut was released on August 25, 1992. The album was met with mostly positive reviews but did not do well commercially, with a reported 40,000 copies sold. Despite low sales, The Wallflowers began touring nationwide, mostly as an opening act for several bands including the Spin Doctors and 10,000 Maniacs.

Upon returning from a tour in 1993, the band learned that management at Virgin had shifted, leading to the removal of Jeff Ayeroff and Jordan Harris, who had signed The Wallflowers to the label. The new executives at Virgin were not pleased with The Wallflowers' slow sales and the band did not feel they had a future with the label, so they asked to be released from their contract; Virgin complied and by the end of the year, The Wallflowers were left without a label. The band went back to playing clubs in Los Angeles and looking for a new label. During this time, the band went through a number of personnel changes. In 1993, Maguire was asked to leave for undisclosed reasons. The band would continue playing shows with another bass player, Jimmie Snider, until May 1993, when the band found a permanent replacement. Greg Richling, whom Dylan went to high school with, became the band's new bassist. Richling remained a member of The Wallflowers for the next two decades, until he left in 2013. The band continued to play club shows in Los Angeles through mid-1994; it was around this time when Yanowitz left The Wallflowers to join 10,000 Maniacs, then fronted by his girlfriend, Natalie Merchant. Shortly after Yanowitz's departure, The Wallflowers caught the attention of Tom Whalley and Jimmy Iovine of Interscope Records, who signed the band in 1995.

The Wallflowers began recording their second album, Bringing Down the Horse, in 1995. Around the time they began recording, founding member Tobi Miller left the band. A number of guitarists stepped in to finish the album. Bringing Down the Horse was produced by T Bone Burnett and the songs were written by Dylan. The album was released on May 21, 1996, and became the band's most successful album, reaching quadruple platinum status in the U.S. To promote the release, the band toured extensively through the rest of 1996 and through 1997. The Wallflowers now included drummer Mario Calire and guitarist Michael Ward, in addition to Dylan, Jaffee and Richling. The band performed shows as headliners, as well as openers for acts such as Sheryl Crow in early 1997 and Counting Crows in the summer of 1997. They also opened for Tom Petty and the Heartbreakers in January 1997, as well as for the Rolling Stones and Bob Dylan in November 1997. In June 1997, Dylan was featured on the cover of Rolling Stone. In the issue's accompanying interview, Dylan spoke at length about his lineage for the first time.

After touring for nearly two years, The Wallflowers took a short break before returning to the studio to record their third album, (Breach). Dylan approached the songwriting process differently this time than he had for The Wallflowers' two previous albums, explaining that he didn't want to avoid the subject of his personal life, as he had done in the past: "(Breach) was the first record that I realized that it's necessary and I have a right to write about anything that I want to write about. I'm not going to dance around these subjects anymore ... I don't have any interest in writing songs that are defensive or that address anything that don't come naturally to me but I also realized that I needed to stop this nonsense of pretending that hiding any of this information counts to anybody; it just doesn't really matter anymore."

The Wallflowers entered the studio towards the end of 1999 with producers Michael Penn and Andrew Slater, The Wallflowers' manager. (Breach) took about eight months to record and was released on October 10, 2000. The Wallflowers embarked on a tour that lasted through the end of 2000 and into 2001, making stops in Japan and Madison Square Garden in New York for a four-night run, opening for the Who. In October 2000, Dylan was featured on the cover of Rolling Stone for a second time. In October 2001, guitarist Michael Ward announced he was leaving The Wallflowers, citing creative differences.

Dylan began writing for The Wallflowers' fourth album, Red Letter Days, in 2001. The band recorded demos while on tour with John Mellencamp that year before getting into the studio in Santa Monica, California. Due to the absence of a lead guitarist during the recording for Red Letter Days, Dylan took on more lead guitar duties than he had previously. Red Letter Days was produced by founding Wallflowers member Tobi Miller and Bill Appleberry. Following the release of the album's first single, "When You're On Top" on August 16, 2002, Red Letter Days was released on November 5, 2002. Following tours in the US and Europe, drummer Mario Calire announced he was leaving The Wallflowers in 2003.

The Wallflowers returned to the studio in July 2004 to record their fifth album, Rebel, Sweetheart. Instead of recording in Los Angeles, The Wallflowers instead opted to record in Atlanta, Georgia, which was where their producer for this album, Brendan O'Brien, was based. To replace drummer Mario Calire, Fred Eltringham joined The Wallflowers just before getting into the studio. In addition to writing the songs, Dylan also painted the cover art for this album. Rebel, Sweetheart was released on May 24, 2005. The Wallflowers toured through the summer of 2005, joined by guitarist Stuart Mathis, on what would be their last tour for 2 years. After 2005, The Wallflowers parted ways with their longtime record label, Interscope Records.

=== 2006–2011: Solo career ===
Beginning in 2006, Dylan began playing shows without The Wallflowers, though he did tour with the band on numerous occasions between 2007 and 2009. In May and June 2006, Dylan toured with former Wallflowers producer T Bone Burnett, performing solo acoustic opening sets. In fall of that year, Dylan's song "Here Comes Now" was featured as the theme song for an ABC drama, Six Degrees. Also in the fall of 2006, it was announced that Dylan had signed a solo recording contract with Columbia Records.

In 2007, Dylan appeared on several tribute albums, including Endless Highway: The Music of the Band and Instant Karma: The Amnesty International Campaign to Save Darfur, a charity album consisting of covers of John Lennon songs. On Endless Highway, Dylan performed a cover of the Band's "Whispering Pines." For Instant Karma, Dylan performed a cover of Lennon's "Gimme Some Truth," with Dhani Harrison contributing backing vocals on the song.

==== Seeing Things ====
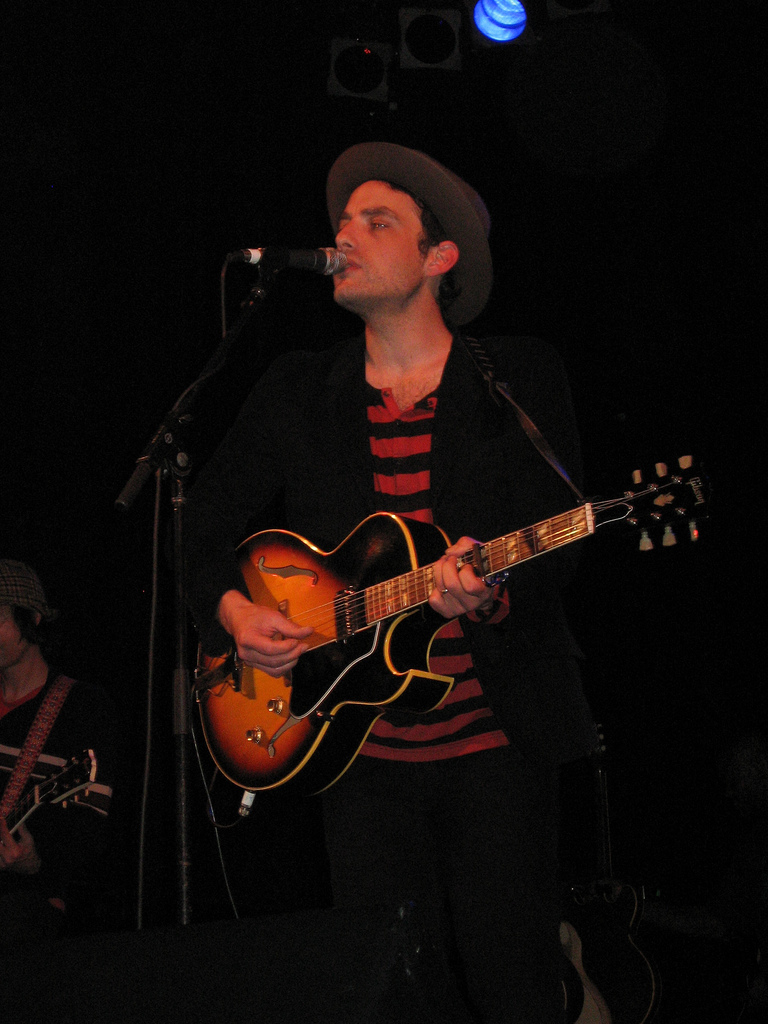
Dylan in 2007

In September 2007, it was reported by The New York Times that Dylan was recording his first solo album at producer Rick Rubin's home in the Hollywood Hills. Regarding its sparse instrumentation and production, Dylan described the differences in the writing process for Seeing Things, compared to writing for The Wallflowers:

A lot of times when you write songs, you're aware that this line is just going to help you get to the next line and someone's probably going to do an organ fill right there anyway — you can let those go. But with something like this, it was just three instruments, really; vocals being one of the instruments, which then makes the lyrics being one of the instruments. You're more aware that things are going to be more exposed and you can't really let anything go unless you're confident that this is what you want to say.

Following the completion of recording in 2007, Seeing Things was released on June 10, 2008. The album received generally favorable reviews and peaked at No.24 in the US on the Billboard 200. Following the release of Seeing Things, Dylan made several television appearances to promote the album and toured with a backing band called the Gold Mountain Rebels, which consisted of Wallflowers drummer Fred Eltringham, guitarist Audley Freed and bassist George Reif. In the summer and fall of 2008, Dylan and the Gold Mountain Rebels played a combination of theaters and festivals in the US, Europe, and Japan, including Farm Aid in Mansfield, Massachusetts, and the Newport Folk Festival. In addition to touring with the Gold Mountain Rebels, Dylan and Eltringham also performed several shows with The Wallflowers in 2008.

==== Women + Country ====
In 2009, Dylan visited T Bone Burnett at a studio where Burnett was producing the soundtrack for the film Crazy Heart. Burnett asked Dylan if he had any new songs to show him. The only song Dylan had was one he had written for Glen Campbell's forthcoming album, Ghost on the Canvas, called "Nothing But the Whole Wide World." Burnett was impressed by the song and asked Dylan to come up with fifteen additional songs so they could put an album together. Dylan came back to Burnett six weeks later with the songs and in 2009 they recorded Dylan's second solo album, Women + Country.

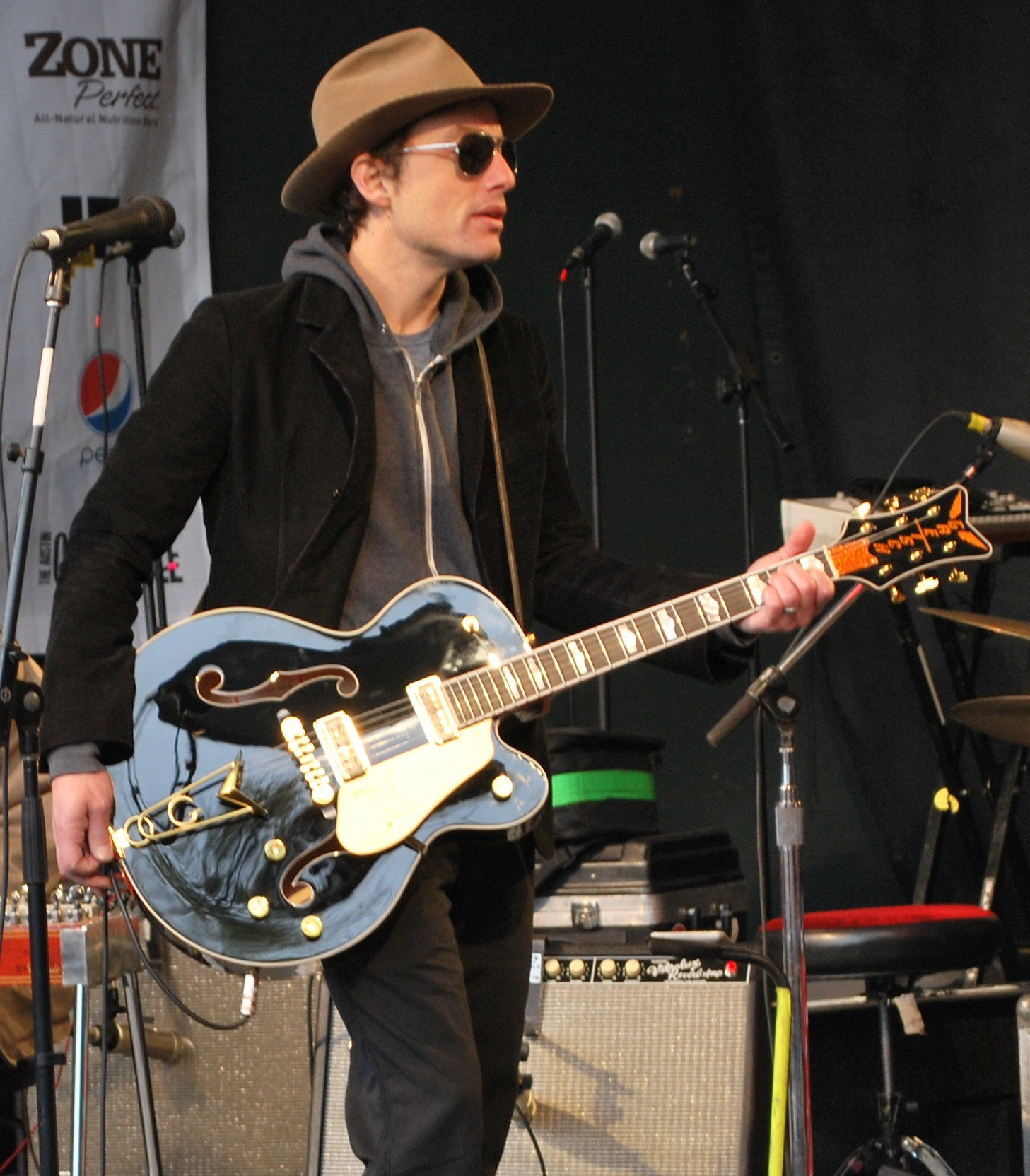
Dylan performing at SXSW in 2010

Women + Country had a decidedly fuller sound than Seeing Things, thanks to the horns, pedal steel and fiddle that were prominently featured throughout the album. Burnett also brought in Neko Case and Kelly Hogan to contribute background vocals on eight of the album's eleven songs.

After releasing an EP version of the album earlier that year, Women + Country was released on April 6, 2010, on Columbia Records. The album was met with generally favorable reviews and peaked at No.12 on the Billboard 200; the highest position any of Dylan's albums – solo or with The Wallflowers – had peaked since The Wallflowers' 1996 breakthrough album, Bringing Down the Horse. In addition to a series of television appearances to promote the album, Dylan and a backing band called Three Legs toured the U.S., the United Kingdom and Ireland in the spring and summer of 2010. At a stop at the Bearsville Theater in Woodstock, New York, Dylan was joined on stage by Garth Hudson of the Band for several songs.

Also in 2010, Dylan sang backing vocals on the Court Yard Hounds' song "See You In the Spring." Along with being released on the Court Yard Hounds' eponymous debut album, the song was specially released as a 45 RPM single for Record Store Day, 2010. Dylan's song "Everybody's Hurting" from Women + Country was featured as the B-side to the record.

In 2011, Dylan was featured on several film and television soundtracks, including A Little Help, for which he wrote three songs, and True Blood: Vol.3, for which he wrote a song with Gary Louris called "Gonna Be a Darkness." Dylan was also featured on the 2011 album, The Lost Notebooks of Hank Williams; an album featuring various artists covering previously "lost" lyrics by Hank Williams. In August 2011, Dylan and Wallflowers keyboardist Rami Jaffee performed at the Farm Aid benefit concert in Kansas City.

=== 2012–present: Return of The Wallflowers and other projects ===
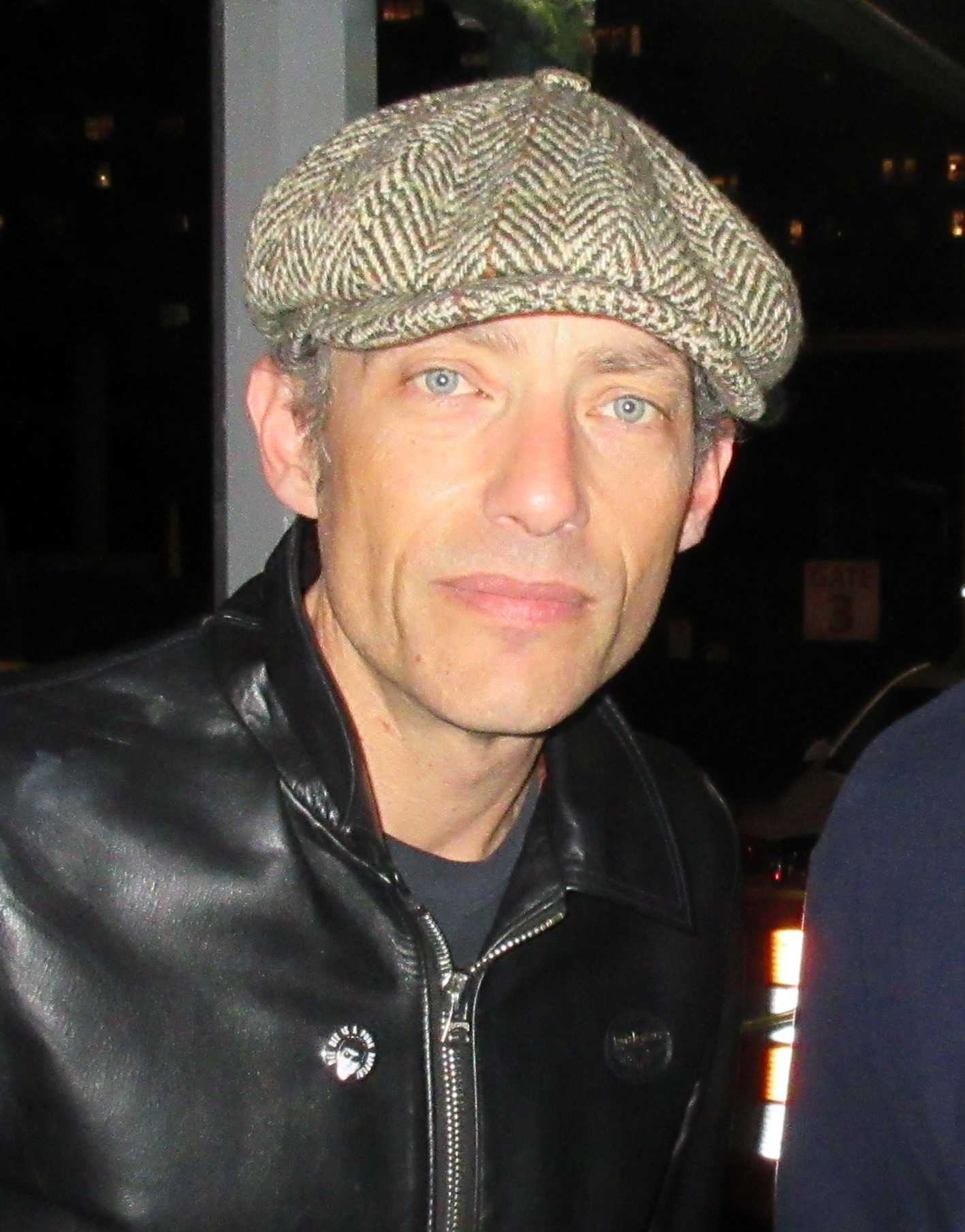
Dylan in 2019

On November 1, 2011, it was announced that The Wallflowers would be reuniting to release a sixth studio album the following year. The Wallflowers had toured on and off during their hiatus but had not made an album together since 2005's Rebel, Sweetheart.

The Wallflowers recorded their sixth studio album, Glad All Over, in Nashville, Tennessee, in early 2012. Shortly before entering the studio, the band replaced drummer Fred Eltringham with Jack Irons. The writing process was different for this album than previous Wallflowers albums; instead of Dylan bringing in completed songs, he brought only lyrics to the studio, and as a band they wrote the music for the songs. The Wallflowers toured throughout the summer and fall of 2012. Glad All Over was released on October 9, 2012, on Columbia Records. In the spring of 2013, The Wallflowers did an arena tour opening for Eric Clapton.

In 2013, The Wallflowers went through a number of personnel changes, beginning with longtime keyboard player Rami Jaffee. Jaffee played his last show with The Wallflowers to date in 2013 but has since not officially announced that he quit the band. Later that year, longtime bass player Greg Richling and drummer Jack Irons announced that they were leaving The Wallflowers, citing that they wanted to focus on a band they were both in called Arthur Channel. A number of drummers and bass players filled in as The Wallflowers continued to tour through the end of 2016.

Aside from work with The Wallflowers, Dylan has played a key role in several other projects. In early 2013, Dylan, along with Dave Matthews, Charlie Sexton, Brady Blade, and Sexton's brother Will, wrote and recorded an album in Shreveport, Louisiana, as a new band called the Nauts. The album has yet to be released.

In September 2015, Dylan released a duet online with Cat Power covering the Byrds' "You Showed Me" (which was later popularized by the Turtles). The song is a track on the 2019 studio album called Echo in the Canyon, in which Dylan covers songs in duets by 1960s-era Southern California folk rock artists, such as the Turtles, the Mamas & the Papas, Buffalo Springfield, and the Beach Boys. Dylan, along with Regina Spektor, Cat Power, Beck, Fiona Apple, and Jade Castrinos, performed these songs in a concert at the Orpheum Theatre in Los Angeles in October 2015. The creation of Echo in the Canyon led Dylan, along with manager Andrew Slater, to create a feature-length documentary about the project, as well as the Laurel Canyon music scene. The film premiered at the LA Film Festival on September 20, 2018, and has been positively received.

== Personal life ==
Dylan has five siblings. He has two brothers and a sister from his father's first marriage to Sara Lownds: Jesse (1966), Anna (1967), and Sam (1968). He also has a half-sister Maria (1961) from his mother's first marriage to Hans Lownds, and a half-sister Desiree (1986) from his father's second marriage to Carolyn Dennis.

Dylan married his girlfriend Paige, a screenwriter, in 1992. The couple have four sons together and live in Los Angeles. The couple are raising their children in the Jewish faith. Dylan had a bar mitzvah, the ceremony that marks Jewish teenage boys' religious coming of age. As an adult, Jakob has said that he considers himself Jewish, regardless of his parents' past or current religious affiliations. In 2005, Dylan spoke about his relationship with his father, Bob Dylan, for the first time in an interview with The New York Times. Because Dylan rarely speaks about his father, there have been ongoing rumors that their relationship is strained. Dylan rebuffed these claims, speaking of his father as "affectionate" towards him and went on to say the two have a "great relationship".

In May 2011, Dylan was awarded an honorary Doctor of Letters degree from Idaho State University.

=== Philanthropy ===
Dylan is a supporter of diabetes awareness and was given a Father of the Year award from the American Diabetes Association on June 4, 2014. The award recognizes men who "have made family a priority, while balancing a demanding career and community involvement". Dylan is also a supporter of Crohn's and colitis awareness. Each year since 2012, he has provided musical entertainment for an annual event put on by Connecting to Cure, a nonprofit dedicated to promoting awareness and funding research to cure Crohn's and colitis.

== Discography ==
=== Studio albums ===
Year	Album details	Peak chart positions		
Year	Album details	US	US Rock	UK
2008	Seeing Things: Release date: June 10, 2008; Label: Columbia Records	24	8	106
2010	Women + Country: Release date: April 6, 2010; Label: Columbia Records	12	2	—
2019	Echo in the Canyon: Release date: May 24, 2019; Label: BMG	—	—	—
"—" denotes releases that did not chart

=== Guest appearances and contributions ===
Year	Artist	Album	Track(s)	Role(s)
1988	Trash Matinee	Trash Matinee	"What Do I Know"	Guitar
1998	Various artists	The Rugrats Movie soundtrack	"This World is Something New to Me"	Vocals
1999	Joe Henry	Fuse	"Skin and Teeth"	Backing vocals
2002	Rusty Truck	Trampoline Records Greatest Hits, Vol. 1	"Never Going Back"	Backing vocals, producer
2002	John Doe	Dim Stars, Bright Sky	"Magic"	Backing vocals
2003	Rosanne Cash	Rules of Travel	"Hope Against Hope"	Composer
2003	The Jayhawks	Rainy Day Music	"Come to the River"	Backing vocals
2003	Rusty Truck	Broken Promises	"Malibu Canyon"	Backing vocals, producer
2004	Percy Sledge	Shining Through the Rain	"Misty Morning"	Backing vocals
2006	Willie Nile	Streets of New York	"The Day I Saw Bo Diddley in Washington Square"	Backing vocals
2007	Various artists	Endless Highway: The Music of The Band	"Whispering Pines"	Vocals
2007	Various artists	Instant Karma: The Amnesty International Campaign to Save Darfur	"Gimme Some Truth"	Vocals, guitar
2007	Jesse Malin	Glitter in the Gutter	"Black Haired Girl"	Backing vocals
2008	Jordan Zevon	Insides Out	"Studebaker"	Backing vocals
2009	Various artists	NCIS Soundtrack	"No Matter What"	Composer, vocals
2009	Various artists	Live From the Artists Den: No.1	"Evil is Alive & Well"	Composer, vocals, guitar
2010	Court Yard Hounds	Court Yard Hounds	"See You in the Spring"	Backing vocals
2010	Various artists	True Blood: Music from the Original HBO Series, Vol. 2	"Ain't No Invisible Man"	Composer, vocals
2011	Various artists	True Blood: Music from the Original HBO Series, Vol. 3	"Gonna Be a Darkness"	Composer, vocals
2011	Various artists	The Lost Notebooks of Hank Williams	"Oh, Mama, Come Home"	Composer, vocals, guitar
2011	Glen Campbell	Ghost on the Canvas	"Nothing But the Whole Wide World"	Composer
2012	Shawn Colvin	All Fall Down	"Seven Times the Charm"	Composer, backing vocals
2013	Holly Williams	The Highway	"Without You"	Backing vocals
2013	Various artists	Love for Levon	"Ain't Got No Home"	Vocals, guitar
2013	Crystal Bowersox	All That for This	"Stitches"	Backing vocals
2013	Various artists	Songs for Slim	"Ain't No Fair (In a Rock 'N' Roll Love Affair)"	Vocals
2014	Lucinda Williams	Down Where the Spirit Meets the Bone	"It's Gonna Rain"	Backing vocals
2015	Louise Goffin	Apple On Fire	"Take a Giant Step"	Backing vocals
2019	Various artists	Single	"For Real"	Vocals
