= Mario Calire =

American drummer, based in Los Angeles

- Born: June 25, 1974 (age 52); Buffalo, New York, US
- Origin: Los Angeles, California, US
- Instrument: Drums
- Years active: 1995–present
- Website: MarioCalire.com

Mario Calire is an American drummer, based in Los Angeles, known for his affiliations with The Wallflowers and Ozomatli and his wide-ranging freelance work.

A native of Buffalo, New York, Calire moved to California when his father, the keyboard and saxophone player Jimmy Calire, had a gig with the band America. Calire and his two brothers were raised in the bohemian Ojai Valley by his father and artist mother.

Calire studied jazz and world music at the California Institute of the Arts. He played frequently around Los Angeles, joining The Wallflowers in 1995 and remaining during the band’s peak years, during which time the band won the Grammy Awards for Best Rock Song and Best Rock Performance by a Duo or Group for the song "One Headlight".

In 2003, Calire joined Los Angeles Latin band Ozomatli. The album, Street Signs, won two Grammys and fueled a career resurgence bolstered by the band's live shows. During Calire's ten-years with the bad, Ozomatli toured throughout the United States, Europe, Japan, Burma, Mongolia, Egypt, Tunisia, Jordan, Lithuania and India. After an amicable split with Ozomatli, Calire began playing with The Wallflowers again as they toured in support of their 2012 record, "Glad All Over". He has since worked as a freelance drummer with artists like Rickie Lee Jones, Liz Phair, Nikka Costa, Brett Dennen, and Pat Green.

He is the brother of the animation director, Jamie Caliri.

== Discography ==
- 1999 Smooth Sailin' - Marty Grebb - drums
- 2000 Blues for a Rotten Afternoon - Various Artists - drums
- 2001 Big Slow Mover - Phil Cody - performer
- 2001 The Ballad of Liverpool Slim - Jackie Lomax - drums
- 2001 I Am Sam [Bonus Tracks] - Original Soundtrack - drums
- 2002 I Am Sam [Japanese Bonus Tracks] - Original Soundtrack - drums
- 2002 I Am Sam - Original Soundtrack - drums
- 2002 Red Letter Days - The Wallflowers - drums, backing vocals, group member
- 2002 Trampoline Records Greatest Hits, Vol. 1 - Various Artists - cymbals, drums
- 2003 Broken Promises - Rusty Truck - drums
- 2003 Coming Up [EP] - Ozomatli - drums
- 2003 Evening of My Best Day - Rickie Lee Jones - drums
- 2003 Liz Phair [Clean] - Liz Phair - drums
- 2003 Liz Phair - Liz Phair - drums
- 2003 Trampoline Records Greatest Hits, Vol. 2 - Various Artists - drums
- 2004 Everything I've Got in My Pocket - Minnie Driver - drums
- 2004 Street Signs - Ozomatli - drums, group member
- 2005 Concord Picante 25th Anniversary Collection - Various Artists - drums
- 2005 Look at All the Love We Found: A Tribute to Sublime - Various Artists - drums
- 2005 Here Comes Memory - Tom Langford - drums
- 2005 Over/Time [EP] - Ted Lennon - drums
- 2005 Live At The Fillmore - Ozomatli - drums
- 2006 Here Comes Memory - Tom Langford - drums
- 2006 So Much More -Brett Dennen - drums
- 2007 Don't Mess with the Dragon - Ozomatli - drums, group member
- 2007 Jessica Callahan - Jessica Callahan - drums
- 2007 SXSW Live 2007 - Various Artists - Drums
- 2008 Luck's Changing Lanes - Rusty Truck - drums
- 2009 Collected: 1996–2005 - The Wallflowers - drums
- 2010 Fire Away - Ozomatli - drums, group member
- 2012 Ozokidz - Ozomatli - drums, group member
- 2014 Place In the Sun - Ozomatli - drums
