= Val McCallum =

American guitarist and singer-songwriter

Valentine McCallum (born 10 October 1963) is an American guitarist and singer-songwriter.

== Career ==
McCallum has toured with, and served as a studio musician for many well-known musicians. He toured with Jackson Browne, and McCallum's musical resume includes stints with Sheryl Crow, Lucinda Williams, The Wallflowers, Bonnie Raitt, and Loretta Lynn, among others. McCallum released his first solo record, entitled At the End of the Day. His parents are actor and musician David McCallum and actress Jill Ireland.

In addition to his solo album and extensive work in touring and session bands, McCallum is also a member of the comic-country band, Jackshit. The band originated as Vonda Shepard's backing band on the hit series Ally McBeal.
