= Cultural depictions of Matthew Shepard =

Cultural depictions of Matthew Shepard include notable films, musical works, novels, plays, and other works inspired by the 1998 Matthew Shepard murder, investigation, and resulting interest the case brought to the topic of hate crime. The best known is the stage play The Laramie Project, which was adapted into an HBO movie of the same name. Matthew Wayne Shepard was an openly gay university student who was brutally attacked near Laramie, Wyoming, in October 1998 and left for dead by his attackers.

People in the entertainment industry expressed outrage and responded in various ways to the attack, and Ellen DeGeneres spoke at Shepard's memorial services in Washington, D.C. Three narrative films were made about the Shepard story: The Laramie Project (2000, based on the play of the same name), The Matthew Shepard Story (2002), and Anatomy of a Hate Crime (2001). The Laramie Project and The Matthew Shepard Story both won numerous awards. The documentary film Laramie Inside Out (2004) focuses on the murder's effect on the Laramie community in the aftermath of the murder.

== Books ==
=== Blood & Tears (1999) ===
Blood & Tears: Poems for Matthew Shepard edited by Scott Gibson and published by Painted Leaf Press in 1999, is a collection of poems by seventy-five different poets. Some of the poems were written in direct response to Shepard's death while others are offered in his memory. Among the contributors are John Ashbery, Mark Bibbins, Rafael Campo, Marilyn Hacker, Rachel Hadas, Gerrit Henry, Anselm Hollo, Patricia Spears Jones, Bernadette Mayer, W.S. Merwin, Eileen Myles, Eugene Richie, Paul Schmidt, David Trinidad, Jean Valentine, Anne Waldman and Rosanne Wasserman.

=== The Meaning of Matthew (2009) ===
The Meaning of Matthew: My Son's Murder in Laramie, and a World Transformed (2009) by Judy Shepard, Matthew's mother, details Matthew's life from birth to death, the aftermath, trial, media coverage and Judy's work with the Matthew Shepard Foundation.

=== October Mourning (2012) ===
October Mourning by Lesléa Newman, a novel in verse about Matthew's murder, was published in 2012. Reception for the work has been favorable. Composer Craig Hella Johnson used parts of the book for his production Considering Matthew Shepard, combining the text with content taken from places such as the Bible and Shepard's journal. Newman's book is also the source of the lyrics for the oratorio October Mourning: A Song for Matthew Shepard, composed by Curtis Heard.

=== The Book of Matt (2013) ===
The Book of Matt by Stephen Jimenez was published by Steerforth in 2013. It details the life of Matt in the Laramie drug scene, and portrays the murder to be about drugs and money. Because it downplays the homophobic aspect of the crime, the book has been condemned by many gay rights activists.

== Films ==
=== Anatomy of a Hate Crime (2001) ===
Anatomy of a Hate Crime is a 2001 made-for-television docudrama based on Shepard's murder. Written by Max Ember and directed by Tim Hunter, it stars Cy Carter as Shepard, Brendan Fletcher as Aaron McKinney, and Ian Somerhalder as Russell Henderson. The drama premiered on MTV on December 10, 2001, after which MTV went dark for 17 1/2 hours while it aired a continuous on-screen scroll listing the names of hundreds of United States hate crime victims. The film was nominated for a GLAAD Media Award for Outstanding TV Movie or Limited Series.

The Shepard family was not consulted or involved with the production of the film, prompting the Matthew Shepard Foundation to issue a statement stating "While we appreciate MTV's efforts to fight anti-gay discrimination and hate crimes, and support the social justice organizations participating in the network's year-long pro-social campaign, the Shepard family wants to make clear that it had no involvement in and does not give its blessing or endorsement to the MTV film Anatomy of a Hate Crime."

=== The Laramie Project (2002) ===
The Laramie Project is a 2002 drama film written and directed by Moisés Kaufman, and based on his own play of the same name mentioned below. The film featured an all-star cast. It premiered at the 2002 Sundance Film Festival and was first broadcast on HBO on March 9, 2002. The film was praised by TV Guide's Matt Roush for its emotional range, its examination of homophobia, and the unique investigation at its center, saying that viewers would be "enlightened" by it.

=== The Matthew Shepard Story (2002) ===
The Matthew Shepard Story is a television film about the trial of the killers of Matthew Shepard. It premiered on NBC on March 16, 2002, one week after HBO's premiere of The Laramie Project. It starred Shane Meier as Matthew Shepard, and depicting his parents were Sam Waterston as Dennis Shepard and Stockard Channing as Judy Shepard. The film won a Primetime Emmy Award in 2002 in the category of Outstanding Supporting Actress in a Miniseries or a Movie for Stockard Channing's performance as Judy Shepard. The film's cast also includes Kristen Thomson, Joseph Ziegler, Makyla Smith, Damien Atkins, and Wendy Crewson. The ending featured Elton John's song about Shepard, "American Triangle", from his album Songs from the West Coast.

The film seeks to illuminate the decisions Judy and Dennis Shepard had to make as to whether the death penalty should be sought for their son's killer. Throughout the movie there are several flashbacks of Matthew's life. It also shows the experiences and hardships Matthew endured throughout his life from junior high through college, including his first kiss, his first boyfriend and a rape scene.

=== Documentaries ===
==== Dear Jesse (1998) ====
Dear Jesse is a 1998 documentary film about the U.S. Senator Jesse Helms (R-NC). It was released theatrically by Cowboy Pictures and on DVD by Sovereign Entertainment in 2007. Written and directed by Tim Kirkman, the film won many awards and was nominated for the Emmy Award for writing (nonfiction feature film) in 2000 after airing on the HBO/Cinemax "Reel Life" series. An interview with Matthew Shepard appears as a postscript in the first-person narrative at a political rally at Catawba College in Salisbury, NC, a small liberal arts school Shepard attended briefly in 1996.

==== Laramie Inside Out (2004) ====
Laramie Inside Out is a 2004 documentary that explores the repercussions of Matthew Shepard's murder on the town of Laramie, Wyoming in the year following his death. Filmmaker Beverly Seckinger, who grew up in Laramie, was compelled to return to her hometown to see how this event affected the site of her own closeted adolescence. Along the way she confronts "God-hates-fags" Westboro Baptist Church Reverend Fred Phelps, who condemns Shepard and all homosexuals to a merciless eternity in hell. Through Seckinger we also meet grieving students, teachers, parents, and clergy, working to make the community a safer place, speaking out and taking action.

==== Matt Shepard Is a Friend of Mine (2012) ====
Matt Shepard Is a Friend of Mine is a 2012 documentary directed by Michele Josue, a former friend of Matthew Shepard, which documents the personal life of Matthew Shepard through interviews with friends and family members. In an interview with the Gay Times, Josue commented that Matthew Shepard "became this icon of the LGBT community but in the process he was being stripped away. I had this obligation to tell the world what he was like as a human being and share his story in an honest way. The only way to do that was to make my film." Matt Shepard Is a Friend of Mine premiered simultaneously at both the Mill Valley Film Festival and the Washington National Cathedral on October 4, 2013.

== Poems ==
=== Blood & Tears: Poems for Matthew Shepard (1999) ===
An anthology of poems by seventy five poets in tribute to Matthew Shepard. The poets include John Ashbery, W. S. Merwin, and Harold Norse: Scott M. Gibson (1999). Blood & Tears: Poems for Matthew Shepard. New York, N.Y: Painted Leaf Press. ISBN 1-891305-15-8.

=== "Dive" (2004) ===
Spoken word poet Andrea Gibson recorded their poem "Dive" about Matthew Shepard on their 2004 album Swarm.

=== "Book of Statues" (2016) ===
"Book of Statues", a poem about Matthew Shepard by Richie Hofmann, was Academy of American Poets Poem-a Day on October 12, 2016. Actor Matt Bomer recited the poem in a video for The New York Times in 2018.

== Music ==
=== Albums ===
- 2002: Lullaby – If Thousands recorded their ambient album 2002 Lullaby with a set of 10 songs on Matthew Shepard. Song titles include "he hade the smell of Wyoming sagebrush" and "we miss matt terribly".
- 2016: Considering Matthew Shepard, a "fusion oratorio" by the conductor-composer Craig Hella Johnson.

=== Songs ===
- 1998: "Lacrimae Laramie" – Hugh Blumenfeld wrote and performed this song on his album Mr. Jekyll and Dr. Hyde.
- 1998: "Merman" – Tori Amos dedicated her song "Merman" to Shepard throughout her '98 tour. It was released the next year on the benefit album No Boundaries: A Benefit for the Kosovar Refugees.
- 1999: "Elegy for Matthew" – A choral work by composer David Conte, with text by poet John Stirling Walker, commissioned by the New York City Gay Men's Chorus, premiered at Carnegie Hall in New York in 1999.
- 1999: "Matthew Shepard" – A song composed by David del Tredici that depicts Matthew Shepard's final hours of life.
- 1999: "Scarecrow" – In 1999, Melissa Etheridge released the song "Scarecrow" on the album Breakdown as a response to Shepard's murder. This ballad uses the image of a scarecrow because the bicyclist who found Shepard's body first thought that it was scarecrow lying in the fields. In her autobiography The Truth Is... she said that she and some of her friends, including Ellen DeGeneres organized a trip to the Denver hospital. Etheridge said that Shepherd's death made her especially sad since he looked like a gay friend of hers in high school which made her "cry uncontrollably."
- 1999: "Trouble the Waters" – Big Country recorded the song "Trouble the Waters" on their album Driving to Damascus, released in 1999. The song has a reference to Matthew Shepard's murder.
- 1999: "Pistol Whipped" - The Blamed wrote and recorded this condemnation of Shepard's murderers. From their 1999 album "Forever".
- 2000: "Into the Sun" – Jann Arden recorded the song "Into the Sun," listing Shepard among "decent men" who had been killed, for her 2000 album Blood Red Cherry. It was also released as a single. The album and single were charted hits in Canada.
- 2000: "What Matters" – Randi Driscoll recorded the song "What Matters" for as an "official benefit single" for the Matthew Shepard Foundation.
- 2001: "American Triangle" – Elton John and Bernie Taupin wrote the song American Triangle which appeared on the 2001 album Songs from the West Coast with Rufus Wainwright on backing vocals. The song is dedicated to the memory of Matthew Shepard.
- 2001: "Cheyenne" – Good Riddance recorded the song "Cheyenne" on their 2001 album Symptoms of a Leveling Spirit.
- 2001: "Laramie" – Amy Ray recorded her song "Laramie" on her 2001 album Stag about Shepard.
- 2001: "Sacrifice" – Best Revenge recorded the song "Sacrifice" on their 2001 album Starts With You.
- 2002: "God Loves Everyone" – Ron Sexsmith wrote and performed the song "God Loves Everyone" on his 2002 album Cobblestone Runway. Reviewer Adrien Begrand said that "God Loves Everyone", "inspired by the brutal murder of gay Wyoming student Matthew Shepard, is a simple, acoustic song that is a wrenching plea for tolerance that sounds especially poignant these days."
- 2002: "Scarecrow" – Kristian Hoffman wrote the song "Scarecrow" and performs it with Rufus Wainwright on the 2002 album &. The CD liner notes describe the song as evoking "the empty plains of Wyoming, the scene of the death of its subject, Matthew Shepard."
- 2002: "Sounds" – Performed by Suzzy & Maggie Roche, their song "'Sounds" appeared on their 2002 album Zero Church. The liner notes to the CD say that the lyrics to "Sounds" were written by the poet Karen Bashkirew in response to Matthew Shepard's murder.
- 2003: "Hail" – Hamell on Trial recorded the song "Hail" on his 2003 album Tough Love.
- 2003: "Laramie" – Massachusetts hardcore punk band The Suicide File recorded their song "Laramie" on their 2003 album Twilight.
- 2003: "That Ain't Right" – Non-Prophets recorded "That Ain't Right", a song by Sage Francis, on their 2003 album Hope.
- 2003: "Fear and Loathing in Laramie" – Protest the Hero recorded their song "Fear and Loathing in Laramie" on their 2003 album A Calculated Use of Sound.
- 2003: "M. Shepard" – The New Jersey post-hardcore band Thursday wrote and recorded a song about The Laramie Project production titled "M. Shepard" for their 2003 album War All the Time.
- 2004: "Jesus Is On The Wire" – Peter, Paul and Mary recorded the Thea Hopkins song "Jesus Is On The Wire", written about Shepard, for their 2004 album In These Times. The Matthew Shepard story-song is described by Peter, Paul and Mary as "... one of the most important songs we have sung in recent years."
- 2004: "Matthew" – Janis Ian wrote and performed the song 'Matthew' – about Matthew Shepard – for her 2004 album Billie's Bones.
- 2005: "Above the Clouds" – Cyndi Lauper co-wrote her song "Above the Clouds" with Jeff Beck for her 2005 album The Body Acoustic in tribute to Matthew Shepard. Lauper's True Colors Tour 2007 for Human Rights provided information to fans, and a purple wristbands with the slogan "Erase Hate" from The Matthew Shepard Foundation. A dollar from every ticket sold was earmarked for the Human Rights Campaign, which advocates equal rights for gay, lesbian, bisexual and transgender people.
- 2005: "Did You Just Say 'Faggot'?" – Dangers recorded the song "Did You Just Say "Faggot"?" on their 2005 Self-Titled EP
- 2006: "And Sadness Will Sear" – Trivium recorded their song "And Sadness Will Sear" on their 2006 album The Crusade.
- 2006: "The Ballad of Matthew Shepard" – Brian Houston recorded his song "The Ballad of Matthew Shepard" on his 2006 album Sugar Queen.
- 2006: "For Matthew Shepard" – Dorianne Laux wrote a poem "For Matthew Shepard" in her 2006 book Facts about the Moon.
- 2006: "Hinterland" – The Radiators from Space recorded their song "Hinterland" on their 2006 album Trouble Pilgrim
- 2006: "Incinerate" – Elysia recorded their song "Incinerate" for their 2006 album Masochist.
- 2008: "Poster Child" – A Balladeer wrote and recorded the song "Poster Child", which appeared on their second album Where Are You, Bambi Woods?. The song and its impressive videoclip is a tribute to Matthew as well an indictment to hate crime.
- 2009: "Imagine" – Lady Gaga performed John Lennon's "Imagine" at the Human Rights Campaign's annual National Dinner in 2009 and changed the lyrics from "above us only sky" to "and only Matthew in the sky".
- 2010: "The Fence (Matthew Shepard's Song)" – Peter Katz wrote this song and it's featured on his 2010 album First of the Last to Know. In concert he performs it without a microphone usually in the middle of the audience.
- 2010: "Scarecrow" – American hardcore band Stick to Your Guns recorded "Scarecrow" for their 2010 album, The Hope Division.
- 2011: "Little Birds" – American psych folk band Neutral Milk Hotel recorded "Little Birds" as part as their Walking Wall of Words compilation package.
- 2012: "Hands of Hate", written by Ryan Cassata – a song about various tragedies that befell members of the LGBTQ community.
- 2014: October Mourning: A Song for Matthew Shepard, a two-hour oratorio for SATB chorus and orchestra composed by Curtis Heard and premiered in Long Beach at the First Congregational Church (Long Beach, California). Lyrics were written by Leslea Newman (from her 2012 book, also titled October Mourning: A Song for Matthew Shepard)
- 2016: Considering Matthew Shepard, a 100-minute oratorio for SATB chorus, piano and strings, was written by Craig Hella Johnson and premiered by Conspirare in Austin, Pasadena and Los Angeles in February 2016. Conspirare released a CD recording of the work, which features poetry by Hildegard von Bingen, Lesléa Newman, Michael Dennis Browne and others, in October 2016.
- 2026: "Matthew" – Japanese singer Hiro Makemake wrote and recorded this song about Matthew Shepard.

== Stage plays ==
=== The Laramie Project (2000) ===
The Laramie Project is a play by Moisés Kaufman and members of the Tectonic Theater Project about the reaction to the murder of Shepard. The play draws on hundreds of interviews conducted by the theatre company with inhabitants of the town, company members' own journal entries and published news reports ranging from a few months after the attack to a few years after. The play is designed to display the town's reaction to the crime.

It premiered at The Ricketson Theatre by the Denver Center Theatre Company (Denver) (part of the Denver Center for the Performing Arts) in February 2000 and was then performed in the Union Square Theater in New York City before a November 2002 performance in Laramie, Wyoming. The play has also been performed by high schools, colleges, and community theaters across the country, as well as professional playhouses in the United States, Canada, the United Kingdom, Ireland, Australia, and New Zealand.

=== The Laramie Project: 10 Years Later (2009) ===
Almost a decade later, Tectonic Theater Project created a second play, titled The Laramie Project: 10 Years Later, based on interviews with members of the town, Shepard's mother, and his incarcerated murderer.

=== MATT by John Watts (2018) ===
This play brings Matthew Shepard on stage in his own words, using information provided by some of Matt’s closest high-school friends. The cast consists of six people—four young actors and two older professionals—and the set is the same throughout. No lavish requirements. A recorded reading of the play is available, made at London’s Guildhall School of Drama in April 2017. John Watts gave a TEDx talk about writing the play.

== See also ==
- Matthew Shepard Foundation
