= The Matthew Shepard Story =

2002 television film directed by Roger Spottiswoode

- DVD cover
- Written by: John Wierick; Jacob Krueger
- Directed by: Roger Spottiswoode
- Starring: Shane Meier; Stockard Channing; Sam Waterston
- Music by: Jeff Danna; Mychael Danna
- Countries of origin: Canada; United States
- Original language: English

Production
- Producer: Clara George
- Cinematography: John Bartley
- Editor: Dominique Fortin
- Running time: 88 minutes

Original release
- Network: NBC
- Release: March 16, 2002

The Matthew Shepard Story is a 2002 made-for-television film directed by Roger Spottiswoode, based on the true story of Matthew Shepard, a 21-year-old gay youth who was murdered in 1998. The film scenario written by John Wierick and Jacob Krueger, it starred Shane Meier as Matthew, Stockard Channing as Judy Shepard and Sam Waterston as Dennis Shepard.

Producers were Alliance Atlantis Communications, with the assistance/participation of CTV and Cosmic Entertainment, with support from the Cdn. Film or Video Production Tax Credit (CPTC). The film premiered on NBC on March 16, 2002, one week after HBO premiered another Shepard film entitled The Laramie Project. The Matthew Shepard Story was also shown on CTV, with language versions shown in many countries.

== Plot ==
In 1998, a young gay man by the name of Matthew Shepard (Shane Meier) was robbed, viciously beaten and left tied to a fence to die. Although he's found by the police, rescued and hospitalized, he dies from his injuries. This film recounts the events after the conviction of the two men responsible for this hate-motivated murder.

Matthew's parents, though satisfied by the conviction, are finding the sentencing phase of the trial more difficult. The parents initially want to request the death penalty for their son's murderers, but the mother, Judy Shepard (Stockard Channing), starts to reconsider. As they struggle with their decision, they decide to reexamine the life of their son and rediscover his personality, his struggle to accept his homosexuality as a natural part of his being and above all, his generous humanity to others. All of this leads the parents to appeal to the court the way their son would have wanted, not out of vengeance but to represent best of what their son was and the tragedy of his loss.

== Cast ==
- Shane Meier as Matthew Shepard
- Stockard Channing as Judy Shepard
- Sam Waterston as Dennis Shepard
- Wendy Crewson as Sarah
- Kristen Thomson as Romaine Patterson
- Joseph Ziegler as Cal
- Yani Gellman as Pablo
- Damien Atkins as Donny
- Philip Eddolls as Aaron McKinney
- Paul Robbins as Russell Henderson
- Judah Katz as Defense Attorney
- Drew Nelson as Lance
- Nazneen Contractor as Shima
- Makyla Smith as Casey
- Lindsay Murrell as Matthew's Date
- James Bearden as Protester
- B.J. McLellan as Logan Shepard (age 17)
- David Broadhurst as Logan Shepard (age 12)
- Shawna Lori Burnett as Female Officer
- John Henry Canavan as Painter
- Bruce Beaton as Cowboy
- Brian Frank as Neighbour
- Sadie LeBlanc as Girlfriend
- Jim Codrington as Health Food Store Manager
- Dorothy Gordon as Elderly Woman
- Susan Chuang as Female News Anchor
- Richard Blackburn as Judge
- Ray Kahnert as The Minister
- Patricia Carroll Brown as Angry Mourner
- Dinah Watts as Cal's Secretary
- Eduardo Gómez as Gomez
- Scott McLaren as Drug Dealer
- Derek Gilroy as Mike
- Scott Wickware as The Bartender

== Production ==
Principal photography began from May 5, 2001 to May 30, 2001.

== Awards and nominations ==
| Year | Award | Category | Nominee(s) | Result | Ref. |
|---|---|---|---|---|---|
| 2002 | Gemini Awards | Best Actor in a Featured Supporting Role in a Dramatic Program or Mini-Series | Sam Waterston | Won | |
| 2002 | Gemini Awards | Best Writing in a Dramatic Program or Mini-Series | John Wierick and Jacob Krueger | Nominated | |
| 2002 | Gemini Awards | Best Original Music Score for a Program or Mini-Series | Jeff Danna and Mychael Danna | Won | |
| 2002 | Online Film & Television Association Awards | Best Actress in a Motion Picture or Miniseries | Stockard Channing | Nominated | |
| 2002 | Primetime Emmy Awards | Outstanding Supporting Actress in a Miniseries or a Movie | Stockard Channing | Won | |
| 2003 | GLAAD Media Awards | Outstanding Television Movie | | Nominated | |
| 2003 | Outfest | Best Actor in a Leading Role | Shane Meier | Won | |
| 2003 | Satellite Awards | Best Actress in a Miniseries or Motion Picture Made for Television | Stockard Channing | Nominated | |
| 2003 | Screen Actors Guild Awards | Outstanding Performance by a Female Actor in a Miniseries or Television Movie | Stockard Channing | Won | |
| 2003 | Writers Guild of America Awards | Paul Selvin Award | John Wierick and Jacob Krueger | Won | |

== Soundtrack ==
The film also contains soundtrack album with the following:

- "Matthew Songs" – Written, performed and produced by Jim Huff
- "El Burkan" – Written by Hossam Ramzy
- "I Keep Holdin' On" – Written by T. Leonard and A. Lerman, performed by Fathead
- "Lonesome World" – Written and performed by Paul Kass
- "Good Vibration" – Written by Mladen Borosak and Tom Barlow, performed by Twigg
- "Naked in the Water" – Written and performed by Michaela Foster Marsh
- "Shine" – Written Rob Garnder, Kadru Gardner and Mike Thibeau, performed by Electrostatic
- "I Want You to Fall" – Written and performed by Monica Schroeder
- "Get You Some" – Written by Robert J. Walsh, Ron Chick, Dennis Winslow
- "Edge of a Dream" – Written by Billy Livesay and David Graham, performed by Billy Livesay
- "Who'll Hold On" – Written and performed by Adam Daniel
- "American Triangle" – Written by Elton John and Bernie Taupin, performed by Elton John
- "What Matters" – Written and performed by Randi Driscoll

== See also ==
- Anatomy of a Hate Crime
- The Laramie Project
- Cultural depictions of Matthew Shepard
