= The Laramie Project (film) =

2002 American film

- DVD cover
- Based on: The Laramie Project by Moisés Kaufman; Tectonic Theater Project
- Screenplay by: Moisés Kaufman
- Directed by: Moisés Kaufman
- Starring: Nestor Carbonell; Christina Ricci; Dylan Baker; Terry Kinney; Lou Ann Wright
- Music by: Peter Golub
- Country of origin: United States
- Original language: English

Production
- Producer: Declan Baldwin
- Cinematography: Terry Stacey
- Editor: Brian A. Kates
- Running time: 97 minutes
- Production companies: Good Machine; HBO Films

Original release
- Network: HBO
- Release: March 9, 2002

The Laramie Project is a 2002 drama film written and directed by Moisés Kaufman and starring Nestor Carbonell, Christina Ricci, Dylan Baker, Terry Kinney, and Lou Ann Wright. Based on the play of the same name, the film tells the story of the aftermath of the 1998 murder of Matthew Shepard in Laramie, Wyoming. It premiered at the 2002 Sundance Film Festival and was first broadcast on HBO on March 9, 2002.

== Cast ==
- Néstor Carbonell as Moisés Kaufman
- Christina Ricci as Romaine Patterson
- Dylan Baker as Rulon Stacey
- Terry Kinney as Dennis Shepard
- Lou Ann Wright as Judy Shepard
- Mark Webber as Aaron McKinney
- Laura Linney as Sherry Johnson
- Peter Fonda as Dr. Cantwore
- Jeremy Davies as Jedadiah Schultz
- Camryn Manheim as Rebecca Hillicker
- Andy Paris as Stephen Belber
- Grant Varjas as Greg Pierotti
- Kelli Simpkins as Leigh Fondakowski
- Clea DuVall as Amanda Gronich
- James Murtaugh as Reverend Fred Phelps
- Frances Sternhagen as Marge Murray
- Michael Emerson as Reverend
- Summer Phoenix as Jen Malmskog
- Margo Martindale as Trish Steger
- Steve Buscemi as Doc O'Connor
- Greg Pierotti as Jon Peacock
- Janeane Garofalo as Catherine Connolly
- John McAdams as Jonas Slonaker
- Joshua Jackson as Matt Galloway
- Ben Foster as Aaron Kreifels
- Amy Madigan as Officer Reggie Flutty
- Tom Bower as Father Roger Schmit
- Clancy Brown as Rob Debree
- Kathleen Chalfant as Female Rancher
- Bill Irwin as Harry Woods
- Lois Smith as Lucy Thompson

== Reception ==
Matt Roush of TV Guide praised the film for "elevating Shepard's murder to a higher crossroads of journalism and theatricality." Roush singled out the film's cast, and its "original" and "unique investigation", likening its focus on Nestor Carbonell's Kaufman to Truman Capote making himself the star of In Cold Blood. Roush also noted the film's emotional range and its examination of homophobia, saying that it could "enlighten" viewers.

== Awards and nominations ==
Year	Award	Category	Nominee(s)	Result	Ref.
2002	Berlin International Film Festival	First Movie Award	Moisés Kaufman	Won	
2002	Gotham Awards	Breakthrough Director (Open Palm Award)	Moisés Kaufman	Nominated	
2002	Humanitas Prize	90 Minute or Longer Network or Syndicated Television	Moisés Kaufman	Won	
2002	National Board of Review Awards	Best Film Made for Cable TV		Won	
2002	Online Film & Television Association Awards	Best Motion Picture Made for Television		Nominated	
2002	Online Film & Television Association Awards	Best Supporting Actress in a Motion Picture or Miniseries	Amy Madigan	Nominated	
2002	Online Film & Television Association Awards	Best Direction of a Motion Picture or Miniseries		Nominated	
2002	Online Film & Television Association Awards	Best Writing of a Motion Picture or Miniseries		Nominated	
2002	Online Film & Television Association Awards	Best Ensemble in a Motion Picture or Miniseries		Nominated	
2002	Online Film & Television Association Awards	Best Editing in a Motion Picture or Miniseries		Nominated	
2002	Outfest	Outstanding Artistic Achievement	Moisés Kaufman	Won	
2002	Primetime Emmy Awards	Outstanding Television Movie	Ross Katz, Anne Carey, Ted Hope, Peter Cane, Roy Gabay, and Declan Baldwin	Nominated	
2002	Primetime Emmy Awards	Outstanding Directing for a Miniseries or Movie	Moisés Kaufman	Nominated	
2002	Primetime Emmy Awards	Outstanding Writing for a Miniseries or Movie	Stephen Belber, Leigh Fondakowski, Amanda Gronich, Moisés Kaufman, Jeffrey LaHoste, John McAdams, Andy Paris, Greg Pierotti, Barbara Pitts, Kelli Simpkins, and Stephen Wangh	Nominated	
2002	Primetime Emmy Awards	Outstanding Casting for a Miniseries, Movie or a Special	Ann Goulder	Nominated	
2003	GLAAD Media Awards	Outstanding Television Movie		Won	
2003	Make-Up Artists and Hair Stylists Guild Awards	Best Hair Styling – Television Mini-Series/Movie of the Week	Roseanne Reid and Tanya Barnes-Jones	Nominated	
2003	Producers Guild of America Awards	David L. Wolper Award for Outstanding Producer of Long-Form Television	Ross Katz, Anne Carey, Ted Hope, and Declan Baldwin	Nominated	
2003	Satellite Awards	Best Television Film		Nominated	
2003	Satellite Awards	Best Supporting Actor – Series, Miniseries or Television Film	Jeremy Davies	Nominated	
2003	Satellite Awards	Best Supporting Actor – Series, Miniseries or Television Film	Terry Kinney	Nominated	
2003	Satellite Awards	Best Supporting Actress – Series, Miniseries or Television Film	Frances Sternhagen	Nominated	

== See also ==
- Anatomy of a Hate Crime
- The Matthew Shepard Story
