= Anatomy of a Hate Crime =

American made-for-television docudrama based on the murder of Matthew Shepard

- Based on: True crime
- Written by: Max Ember
- Directed by: Tim Hunter
- Starring: Cy Carter; Brendan Fletcher; Ian Somerhalder
- Music by: Daniel Licht
- Country of origin: United States
- Original language: English

Production
- Executive producers: Lawrence Bender; Kevin Brown
- Producer: Bill Bannerman
- Cinematography: Danny Nowak
- Editor: Sunny Hodge
- Running time: 90 minutes
- Production companies: MTV - Original Movies; for Television; Team Entertainment

Original release
- Network: MTV
- Release: January 10, 2001

Anatomy of a Hate Crime is a 2001 American made-for-television docudrama based on a true crime; it was written by Max Ember and directed by Tim Hunter. It stars Cy Carter, Brendan Fletcher, and Ian Somerhalder. The film is based on the 1998 murder of Matthew Shepard. It premiered on MTV on January 10, 2001, and was nominated for a GLAAD Media Award for Outstanding TV Movie or Limited Series. After the broadcast, MTV went dark for 17½ hours while it aired a continuous on-screen scroll listing the names of hundreds of United States hate crime victims.

== Premise ==
Based on the 1998 murder of gay college student Matthew Shepard.

== Cast ==
- Cy Carter as Matthew Shepard
- Brendan Fletcher as Aaron McKinney
- Ian Somerhalder as Russell Henderson
- Busy Philipps as Chasity Pasley
- Amanda Fuller as Kristen Price
- Gabrielle Miller as Kara Dupree
- Richard Stroh as Carter Grey
- Timothy Webber as Officer Slade
- Grant Linneberg as Officer John Ryan
- Carrie Schiffler as Officer Vicky Reese
- David Haysom as Barrett Cooper

== Production ==
Immediately following the broadcast, MTV News hosted a special on hate crimes, and then the cable station aired a continuous on-screen scroll listing the names of hundreds of United States hate crime victims. The scroll ran continuously and commercial free for seventeen and-a-half hours, and was the first time in its 20-year history, the network went dark. It was estimated that it cost MTV about $2 million in advertising revenue.

Writer Max Ember said the script wasn't really about Matthew Shepard, but "about the murder of Matthew Shepard". He thought by portraying the story from the point of view of Aaron McKinney and Russell Henderson, the two murderers, "that something very unique could happen". He said "Aaron and Russell didn't have any great political agenda, any great belief system in fact at all". Ember went on to opine that "they didn't hate gay people any more than anyone else they knew...they didn't wake up in the morning and say 'we're gonna kill a fag'...nonetheless that's exactly what happened and I thought it's worthy of discovering why that would happen."

Cy Carter recalled the project being secretive in nature when he first auditioned. He said when he first read the script "everyone's names were different", but when he was asked back for a second audition, they told him it was a Matthew Shepard story. Carter said it was difficult to re-create the beating/murder scene, and it left the cast and production crew all in tears. He said Brendan Fletcher and Ian Somerhalder, were both in tears because "they had to go places inside of themselves I'm sure were kind of scary to rummage up that kind of hatred, and this wasn't even real, but just to see that, a tenth of what it would have been like for him [Shepard], just made them realize what an important film they were working on".

The Matthew Shepard Foundation put out the following statement in relation to the film:

"While we appreciate MTV's efforts to fight anti-gay discrimination and hate crimes, and support the social justice organizations participating in the network's year-long pro-social campaign, the Shepard family wants to make clear that it had no involvement in and does not give its blessing or endorsement to the MTV film Anatomy of a Hate Crime."

== Critical reception ==
The Washington Post wrote in their review that the best parts of the film are "the performances of Cy Carter as the 21-year-old Shepard and Brendan Fletcher as one of his killers, Aaron McKinney...the worst part is that writer Max Ember couldn't settle on a timeline and so jumps all over the calendar like a jack rabbit...murder anatomies, especially ones hoping to teach lessons, should be methodical and thorough, and this hopscotching technique is distracting and lazy".

The Baltimore Sun said it is "not only a good movie, but also one with the potential to do good". They praised Ian Somerhalder's performance as "outstanding", and said the character he portrayed, Russell Henderson, is "made comprehensible by a smart script", [however] the producers took a big risk "humanizing someone who committed such a monstrous act...but they are wise enough to understand that the only way we will understand our own capacity for hate is to recognize our own worst impulses and passions in the killers...In the end, this is what makes the film worthy of being judged as art rather than just propaganda".

== See also ==
- Cultural depictions of Matthew Shepard
- The Laramie Project
- Matthew Shepard Foundation
- The Matthew Shepard Story
- Violence against LGBTQ people
