= The Laramie Project =

2000 play by Moisés Kaufman and others

- Cover of the published text
- Original language: English
- Written by: Moisés Kaufman and members of the Tectonic Theater Project
- Characters: Residents of Laramie and members of the Tectonic Theater Project
- Subject: Homophobia, Violence, Discrimination
- Genre: Verbatim theatre
- Setting: Laramie, Wyoming

Premiere
- Date: February 2000
- Place: Ricketson Theatre, Denver Laramie Wyoming

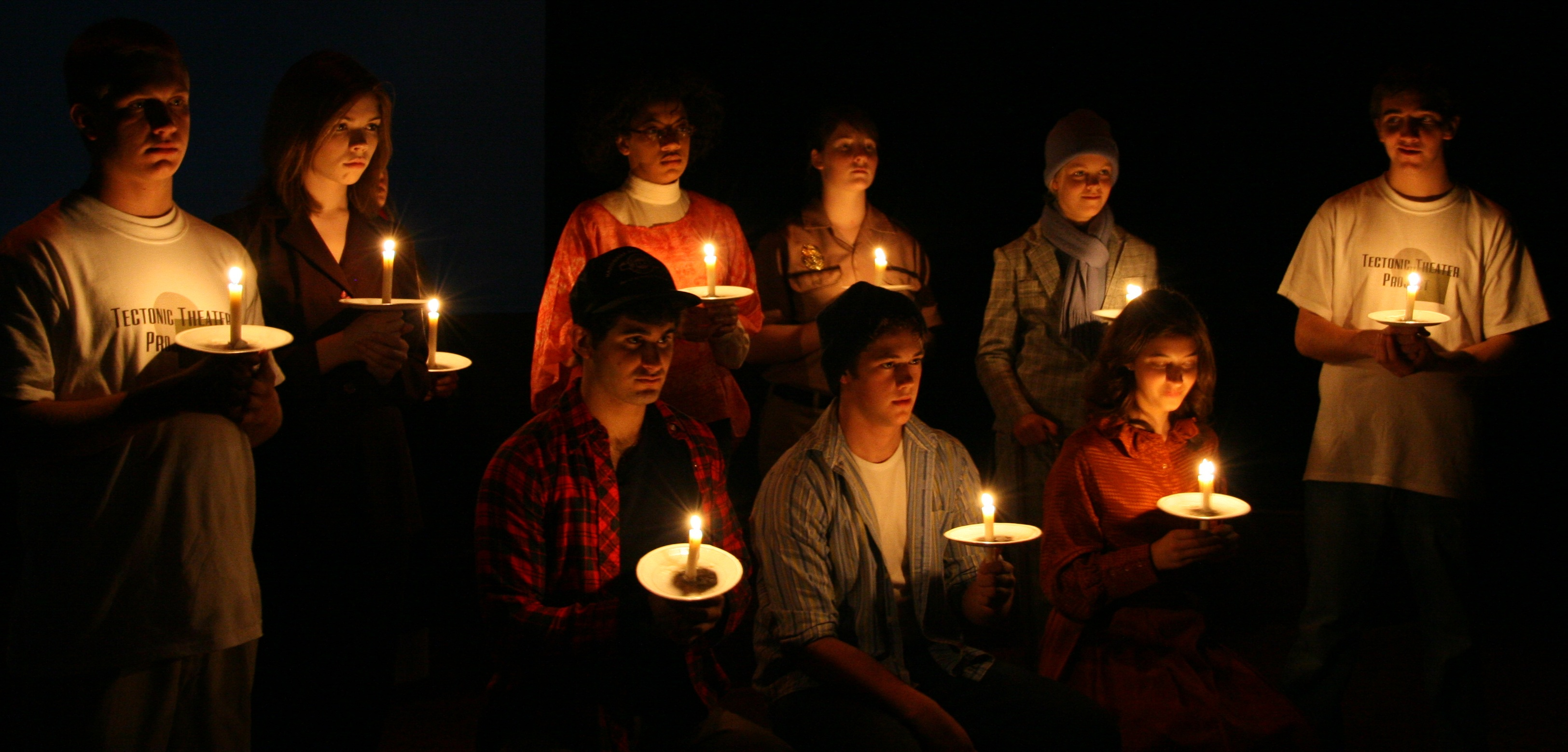
Scene from a 2008 performance depicting the candlelight vigils held for Matthew Shepard

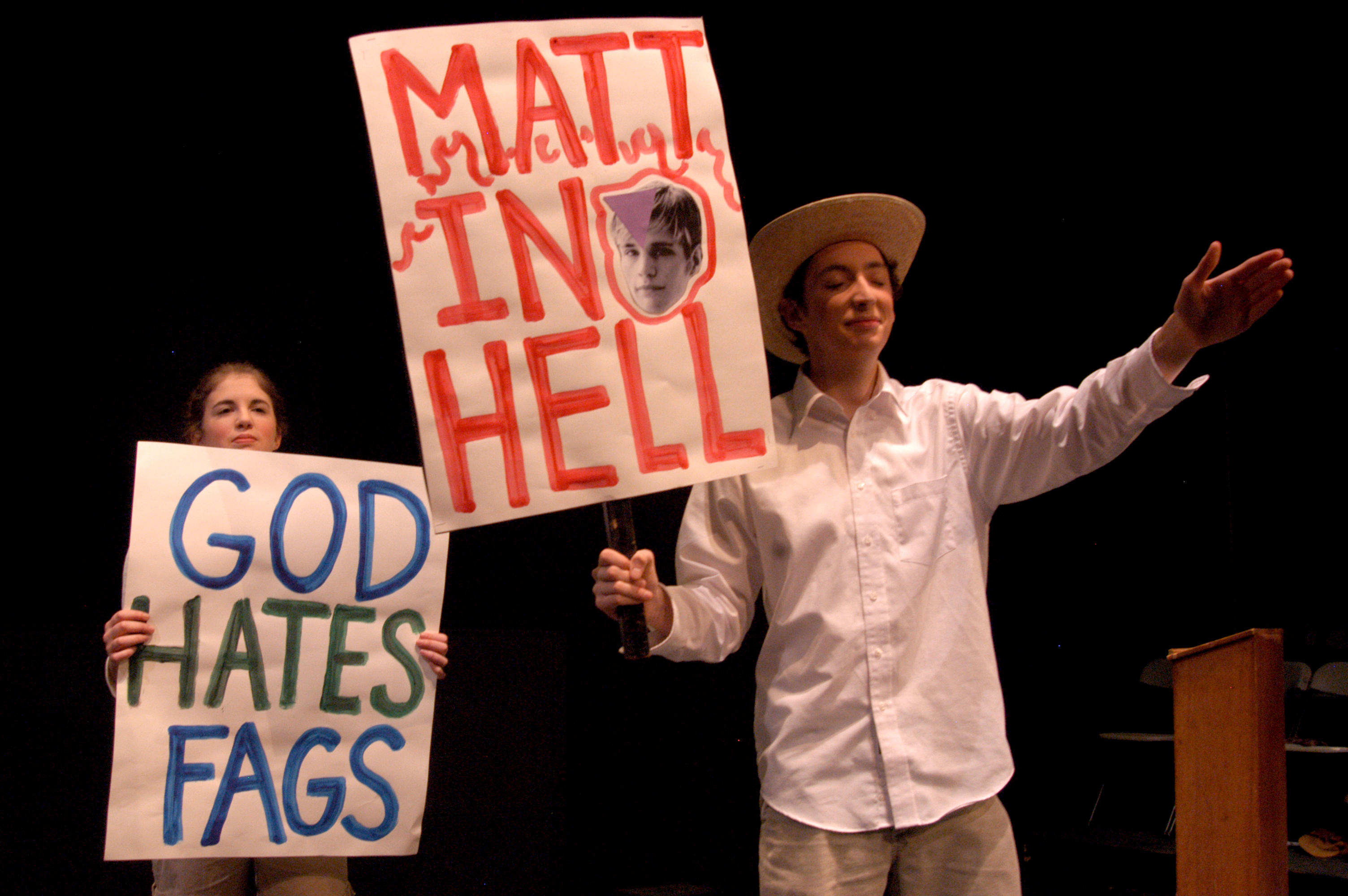
Scene from 2005 performance depicting Westboro Baptist Church protesters

The Laramie Project is a 2000 American play by Moisés Kaufman and members of the Tectonic Theater Project (specifically, Leigh Fondakowski, writer-director; Stephen Belber, Greg Pierotti, Barbara Pitts, Stephen Wangh, Amanda Gronich, Sara Lambert, John McAdams, Maude Mitchell, Andy Paris, and Kelli Simpkins) about the reaction to the 1998 murder of gay University of Wyoming student Matthew Shepard in Laramie, Wyoming. The murder was denounced as a hate crime and brought attention to the lack of hate crime laws in various states, including Wyoming.

An example of verbatim theatre, the play draws on hundreds of interviews conducted by the theatre company with inhabitants of the town, company members' own journal entries, and published news reports. It is divided into three acts, and eight actors portray more than sixty characters in a series of short scenes.

== Performances ==
The Laramie Project premiered at The Ricketson Theatre by the Denver Center Theatre Company (Denver) (part of the Denver Center for the Performing Arts) in February 2000. It was next performed in the Union Square Theatre in New York City before a November 2002 performance in Laramie, Wyoming. The play has also been performed by high schools, colleges, and community theaters across the country. It has been produced at professional playhouses in the United States, Canada, the United Kingdom, Ireland, Australia, and New Zealand.

Many of the performances in the United States have been picketed by followers of Fred Phelps from the Westboro Baptist Church. They are portrayed in the play picketing Matthew Shepard's funeral as they did in real life.

The play has been produced worldwide in the years since its premiere. But in 2009 it still generated controversy in Colorado and Las Vegas, Nevada, where some parents tried to block a production.

The holder of the royalties/rights to The Laramie Project is Dramatists Play Service, Inc. The Matthew Shepard Foundation provides help and resources for those wishing to produce The Laramie Project or The Laramie Project: Ten Years Later. The Foundation's Laramie Project Specialist can help with media, historical context, creative consulting, and other resources and services at no charge to non-profit theatres and educational and religious institutions. The Foundation can also help those who wish to engage their communities in a conversation about how to erase hate in the world.

As a result of the play's success, HBO commissioned a 2002 film of The Laramie Project, also written and directed by Kaufman.

== Actors ==
Notable actors/actresses who have performed in The Laramie Project include Van Hansis, Mary Beth Peil, Jenna Ushkowitz, Laura Linney, Joshua Jackson, Stephanie March, Peter Hermann, Peter Fonda, Camryn Manheim, Daniel de Weldon, Cyndi Lauper, Clea DuVall, Christina Ricci, Judith Light, Terry Kinney, Frances Sternhagen, Brian Kerwin, Robert Desiderio, Chad Allen, Stockard Channing, Darren Criss, Andrew Garfield, and Amy Madigan.

== Combating homophobia ==
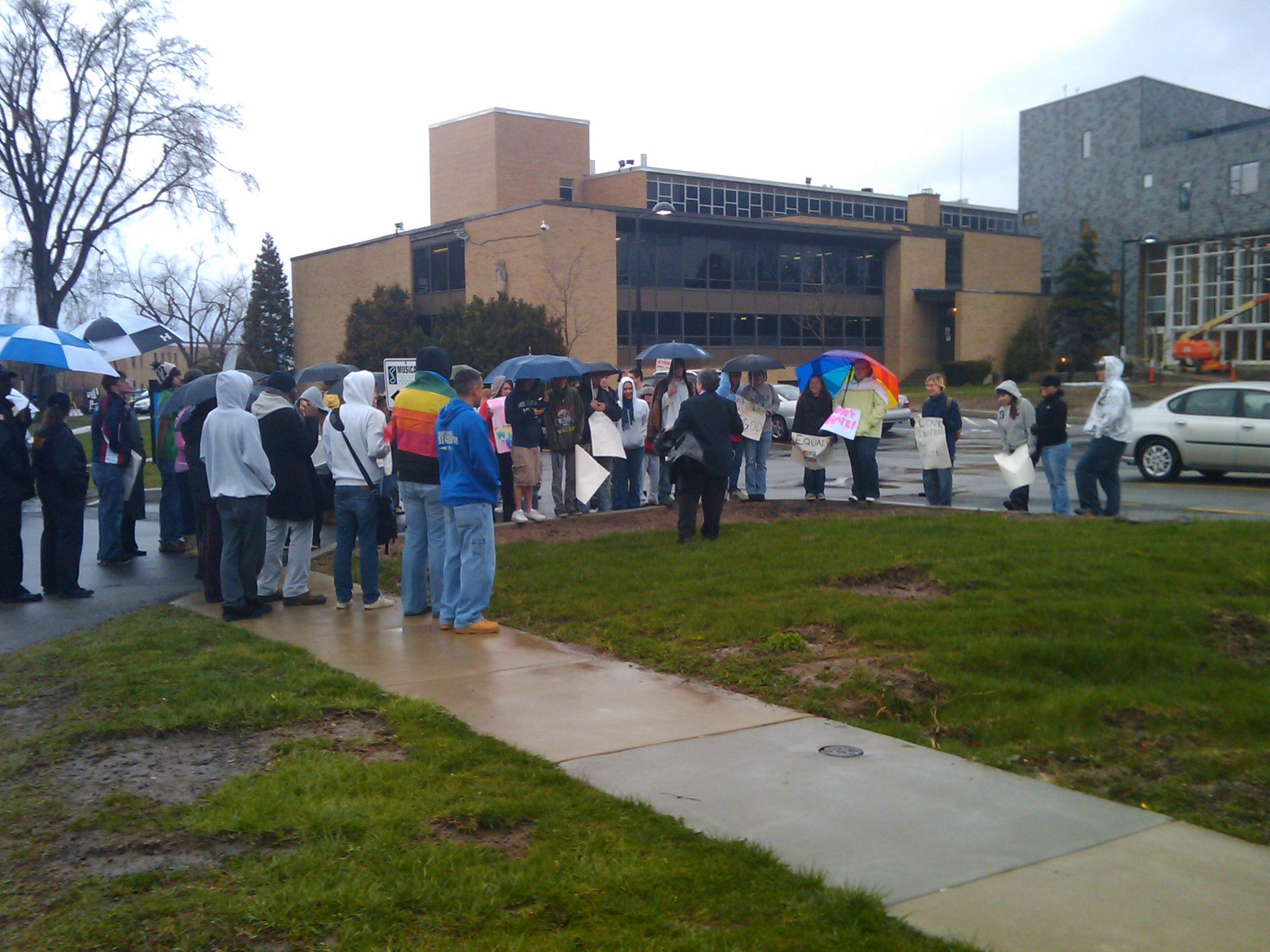
Group preparing to block from view members of the Westboro Baptist Church protesting a production at Daemen College

The Laramie Project is often used as a method to teach about prejudice and tolerance in personal, social, and health education and citizenship in schools, and it has also been used in the UK as a General Certificate of Secondary Education text for English literature.

The play has also inspired grassroots efforts to combat homophobia. After seeing the play, New Jersey resident Dean Walton was inspired to donate more than 500 books and other media to the University of Wyoming's Rainbow Resource Center (renamed the Pokes Center for Community Resources in 2024 in response to legal and budgetary action from the Wyoming Legislature that restricted resources for DEI programs). The campus office houses the largest LGBTQ library in the state of Wyoming.

== Return to Laramie ==
Ten years after Shepard's murder, members of Tectonic Theater Project returned to Laramie to conduct follow-up interviews with residents featured in the play. Those interviews were the basis of a companion piece, entitled The Laramie Project: Ten Years Later. The play debuted as a reading at nearly 150 theatres across the US and internationally on October 12, 2009 – the 11th anniversary of Matthew Shepard's death. Many of the openings were linked by webcam to New York City, where Judy Shepard, Matthew's mother, and the play's producers and writers gave an opening speech, followed by an address by actress Glenn Close. Daniel DeWeldon played Aaron McKinney opposite Barbara Bain in the Los Angeles production at Grand Performances, directed by Michael Arabian.

The Laramie Project: Ten Years Later was presented for the first time in rep with The Laramie Project at the BAM Harvey Theater from February 12–24, 2013 as part of an event titled The Laramie Project Cycle. Directed by Kaufman and Leigh Fondakowski, the production featured much of the original cast reprising their roles.

== See also ==
- Violence against LGBT people
- Matthew Shepard Foundation
- Cultural depictions of Matthew Shepard
