= Maryjane Fahey =

American entrepreneur, influencer

Maryjane Fahey is an American entrepreneur and influencer based in New York City. She is the founder and creative director of Glorious Broads: Age Against The Machine.

== Career ==
In 1975, Fahey began working as a freelance art director and designer for magazines. When Roger Black hired her, Fahey was part of the team to launch Fast Company and Esquire Gentleman, re-designed Esquire, Newsweek and several international newspapers.

=== Editorial ===
In 2003, Fahey and David O'Connor started FaheyOConnor, a New York City-based design studio specializing in editorial, photography and creative direction. Their company led the redesign of BusinessWeek.

In January 2010, Fahey founded Maryjane Fahey Design, a New York City-based design studio. Fahey worked on the redesign of Tatler Asia.

In 2012, Fahey co-wrote "Dumped: A Grown-Up Guide to Gettin' Off Your Ass and Over Your Ex in Record Time" with co-author Caryn Rosenthal.

In 2016, Fahey became founding editor of AARP's Disrupt Aging, a platform focused on combating ageist stereotypes.

In 2018, Fahey founded Glorious Broads, a site focused on women over 50.

=== Public appearances ===
Fahey has been a podcast guest on Reese Witherspoon's The Bright Side, Superage and Rich Little Broke Girls. She has written for The Zoe Report, Huffington Post and Next Avenue. She has also performed at Joe's Pub with Generation Women.
