= Call of the Wild (TV series) =

2000 American television series

- Genre: Adventure
- Based on: The Call of the Wild by: Jack London
- Written by: David Assael; David Fallon
- Directed by: Zale Dalen; Jorge Montesi; David Winning
- Starring: Nick Mancuso; Shane Meier; Rachel Hayward; Kathleen Duborg; Crystal Buble; Ben Cardinal; Bill MacDonald
- Composer: Hal Beckett
- Country of origin: United States
- Original language: English
- No. of seasons: 1
- No. of episodes: 13

Production
- Production locations: Maple Ridge, British Columbia, Canada
- Running time: 60 minutes
- Production company: Call of the Wild Productions

Original release
- Network: Animal Planet
- Release: March 31 – June 26, 2000

Call of the Wild is a 2000 American adventure television series based on Jack London's eponymous 1903 novel. It was originally broadcast on Animal Planet, and the 13 episodes were released on DVD as a 120-minute, full-length movie.

The series received a Leo Award nomination for Best Cinematography in a Dramatic Series (Stephen McNutt), and for Best Production Designer (Brian Davies) in the episode "The Attack". The series was also a 2000 LEO nominee for Best Overall Sound/Drama (Miguel Nunes) and received a nomination for a 2000 Emmy Award for Outstanding Main Title Theme Music (Hal Beckett).

== Plot ==
The inhabitants of Forty Mile in Yukon, Canada are introduced during the 1890s Gold Rush. A caged Buck arrives and is promptly auctioned off as a sled dog. He makes an immediate impression on young Miles, who bids on Buck. However, Miles is outbid by The Swede, who uses Buck on a sled team delivering mail throughout the Yukon. As Buck heads out on the trail with The Swede's team, he makes an enemy of Spitz, the team's vicious lead dog. After several incidents on the trail, including severe weather, wolf attacks, and a fight with Spitz, Buck – as the much reduced team's new lead dog – is able to bring The Swede to safety. The Swede is grateful to Buck, who has saved his life, but must sell Buck in order to buy a new sled team.

While Buck is on the trail with The Swede's team, back at home Miles chafes under his stepfather John Thornton's direction. Miles longs to prove himself as a guide and offers to guide some prospectors, but backs out after they show irrational behavior.

We meet Emma, a capable teenager around Miles' age, who helps run her father's hotel. Both Emma and Miles' mother, Adoley Thornton, want to support Miles in his quest to prove himself as a guide.

Miles has several run-ins with his stepfather, who wants a different future for Miles. A fatigued Buck is bought at auction by brother and sister, Hal and Mercedes, who want to use him on a team to travel the Yukon and Alaska. Miles, encouraged by his mother and Emma, offers to guide them.

== Cast ==
=== Main cast ===
- Nick Mancuso as John Thornton. John is a former guide who runs the Forty Mile Trading Post, Yukon Territory, Canada during the 1890s Gold Rush.
- Shane Meier as Miles Challenger, a 15-year-old in the town of Forty Mile. Miles is captivated by Buck at first sight. Miles lives with his mother Adoley and step-father John Thornton. He has a complicated relationship with John Thornton. Miles yearns to prove himself as a guide.
- Rachel Hayward as Adoley Thornton, mother of Miles. Adoley runs a photography studio in Forty Mile.
- Kathleen Duborg as Mercedes Levant, an American magazine travel writer who comes to the Yukon along with her brother Hal. The Levants are the second owners of Buck. Mercedes remains in Forty Mile, after her brother dies. As the series progresses, she becomes the saloon owner and becomes engaged to The Swede. Mercedes claims to be well known, and to have met notables such as Molly Brown and Thomas Edison.
- Crystal Buble as Emma, is Miles best friend and love interest in the series. She also runs the Forty Mile Hotel with her father, who is frequently away on business. Emma survives an epidemic in town.
- Ben Cardinal as Charlie Jiminy, a local Han native with a reputation as a trainer and healer of sled dogs.
- Bill MacDonald as The Swede, who is contracted to deliver the area mail using his sled team. The Swede is the first owner of Buck.
- Kavic as Buck the sled dog.

== Episodes ==
| No. | Title | Directed by | Written by | Original release date |
|---|---|---|---|---|
| 1 2 | "Pilot" | Unknown | Unknown | March 31, 2000 |
| 3 | "The Attack" | Unknown | Unknown | April 1, 2000 |
| 4 | "The Arrival" | Unknown | Unknown | April 3, 2000 |
| 5 | "Foxfire" | Unknown | Unknown | April 10, 2000 |
| 6 | "Survival" | Unknown | Unknown | April 17, 2000 |
| 7 | "Fool's Gold" | Unknown | Unknown | May 8, 2000 |
| 8 | "The Epidemic" | Unknown | Unknown | May 15, 2000 |
| 9 | "The Haunting" | Unknown | Unknown | May 22, 2000 |
| 10 | "Doc" | Unknown | Unknown | May 29, 2000 |
| 11 | "Storm Warning" | Unknown | Unknown | June 5, 2000 |
| 12 | "Molly Brown" | Unknown | Unknown | June 12, 2000 |
| 13 | "Betrayal" | Unknown | Unknown | June 26, 2000 |

== DVD release ==
Mill Creek Entertainment released the entire series on DVD in Region 1 on September 14, 2010.
