= Stephen Jimenez =

American journalist

- Born: 1952-1953
- Education: Georgetown University
- Occupation: Journalist
- Known for: Coverage of Murder of Matthew Shepard
- Notable work: The Book of Matt

Stephen Jimenez is an American journalist and television producer, known primarily as the author of the 2013 book The Book of Matt.

== Personal life ==
Jimenez is gay, having come out in the 1970s. He is a graduate of Georgetown University. He lives in both Brooklyn, New York and Santa Fe, New Mexico.

== Awards and recognition ==
In 2006, Jimenez won that year's Writers Guild Award for Analysis, Feature or Commentary, together with Richard Gerdau and Glenn Silber, for the ABC report "The Matthew Shepherd Story; Secrets of a Murder (20/20)". In 2005, he shared with Silber and with Elizabeth Vargas a Mongerson Prize for Investigative Reporting on the News Award of Distinction from the Medill School of Journalism for work done for ABC's 20/20. Some police officials interviewed after Jimenez's book's publication disputed certain claims made in the book. Dave O'Malley, the Laramie police commander over the investigations division at the time of Shepard's murder, said Jimenez's claim that Shepard was "a methamphetamine kingpin is almost humorous. Someone that would buy into that certainly would believe almost anything they read." Other police, such as the officer who found the murder weapon, believed it was a drug-related killing.

Rob Debree, lead sheriff's investigator at the time, said the book contains "factual errors and lies", and deemed Jimenez's claim that Shepard was a drug dealer "truly laughable".

== Career ==
Jimenez directed and produced for WTXF-TV the 1995 documentary Yearbook: The Class of '65, documenting Philadelphia's Thomas Edison High School graduating class of 1965, which is believed to have suffered an unusually high number of casualties in the Vietnam war.

He is a co-founder of the advocacy group New Yorkers Against Hidden Predators. The group seeks for the "Child Victims Act" to be passed which Jimenez has promoted for over ten years.

Jimenez is a trustee of the Ucross Foundation.

He has written for Daily Beast, Medium, the New York Post, Byliner and Out.

== The Book of Matt ==
In 2013 Jimenez published The Book of Matt, about the 1998 murder of Matthew Shepard. Jimenez first visited Laramie, Wyoming shortly after the murder, planning to write a screenplay and believing that the murder was a straightforward homophobic hate crime. In the book, Jimenez argues that Shepard and one of his murders, Aaron McKinney, were both involved in the illegal trade in crystal meth, and that the murder was primarily drug-related. Jimenez has said his motivation for writing the book as a desire to show that "the popular narrative (of homophobic murder) served a purpose, but it’s only one thread of a bigger, richer, more challenging story whose lessons we have barely learned. To avoid topics of addiction, including how crystal meth ravaged the queer community (and Matt’s life), is not helpful to anyone."
