= Services & Advocacy for GLBT Elders =

American non-profit organization

Advocacy and Services for LGBTQ+ Elders
- Founded: 1979
- Tax ID no.: 13-2947657
- Location: 305 Seventh Avenue, 15th Floor New York, NY 10001
- Key people: LGBTQ+ older people
- Website: www.sageusa.org
- Formerly called: Senior Action in a Gay Environment

Services and Advocacy for Gay, Lesbian, Bisexual, and Transgender Elders (SAGE) is America's oldest and largest non-profit organization dedicated to improving the lives of lesbian, gay, bisexual, transgender and queer or questioning (LGBTQ+) older people, focusing on the issue of LGBTQ+ aging. According to its mission statement, "SAGE leads in addressing issues related to lesbian, gay, bisexual, transgender, queer and questioning (and other self-identifying members of the LGBTQ+ community) aging. In partnership with its constituents and allies, SAGE works to achieve a high quality of life for LGBTQ+ older people, supports and advocates for their rights, fosters a greater understanding of aging in all communities, and promotes positive images of LGBTQ+ life in later years." SAGE is a 501(c)(3) organization that focuses on advocacy on the local and federal levels, as well as activities, groups, and programs that encourage LGBTQ+ older people to stay connected with each other and the community.

== Leadership ==
SAGE's leadership includes Chief Executive Officer Lynn Faria (since 2025), following the tenure of Michael Adams for almost 20 years. SAGE's work is supported by a board of directors located throughout the U.S. The current board chairs are Loren Ostrow and LuAnn Boylan. Edie Windsor was a vocal advocate for SAGE and former board member.

== History ==
Incorporated by lesbian and gay activists and aging service professionals in 1978 as Senior Action in a Gay Environment, SAGE (now Services & Advocacy for LGBTQ+ Elders) is headquartered in New York City and has partner organizations all over the United States and Puerto Rico. SAGE also supports LGBTI older people in Costa Rica, El Salvador, Nepal, and the Philippines. SAGE works with LGBTQ+ older people and aging service providers to address and overcome the challenges of discrimination in older adult service settings.

SAGE is responsible for creating the nation's first Friendly Visiting Program for frail and homebound LGBTQ+ older people; the country's first support group for LGBTQ+ older people living with HIV; the nation's first program dedicated to caregiving services for LGBTQ+ older people; the creation of the first national conferences devoted to LGBTQ+ aging concerns; and runs multiple centers for LGBTQ+ older people in New York.

In 2010, SAGE became the recipient of a three-year, $900,000 grant from the Department of Health and Human Services and the Administration on Aging to create the nation's only national resource center on LGBTQ+ aging.

In 2022, SAGE announced a new strategic direction and organizational changes: the creation of two semi-autonomous divisions with executive directors called SAGEServes, focused on service programs, and SAGEVenture, devoted to social enterprise; an expanded and flexible partnership approach; and a new Center of Excellence.

SAGE Centers With funding from NYC Department for the Aging (DFTA) and the New York City Council, SAGE opened the nation's first municipally funded senior center in January 2012. Expanded funding in 2014 allowed the opening of new centers in Brooklyn and the Bronx, and expanded services and facilities in Harlem. SAGE also provides services in Staten Island through a community partnership.

Caregivers SAGE's Caregiver program provides a wide range of services for caregivers and care recipients including respite and caregiver support groups. SAGECAP (SAGE Caring And Preparing) was the focus of a New York citywide ad campaign in 2010 which won a GLAAD Media Award in Advertising for "Outstanding Social Marketing Campaign".

Advocacy and Policy SAGE's Government Affairs Team works to ensure that federal, state, and local aging policies are LGBTQ+ and HIV-inclusive and that federal, state, and local LGBTQ+ and HIV policy initiatives reflect the needs of older people. In 2020, SAGE successfully fought for an LGBTQ+-inclusive reauthorization of the Older Americans Act, the primary vehicle for the organization and delivery of aging services in the United States.

== Special Programs ==
SAGE's Special Programs Department offers direct participant services, both in and outside of New York City.

Friendly Visitor Program The New York City Friendly Visitor Program was founded in 1979, and was the first of its kind in the nation, matching volunteers with LGBTQ+ older people for social and emotional support in the form of weekly home visits and calls.

SAGEPositive Program The SAGEPositive Program offers case management, social events, and workshops for LGBTQ+ people over age 50 who are living with or potentially impacted by HIV. It houses the nation's longest-running HIV support group for LGBTQ+ older adults.

SAGEVets Program The SAGEVets Program serves LGBTQ+ Veterans over age 50 across New York State, providing case management, support groups, connection to Veterans Affairs services, and facilitating upgrades for veterans that received an Other Than Honorable Discharge, based on categories that include sexual orientation and gender identity.

Florida Expansion Most recently, the Special Programs Department has replicated some of its program models in South Florida, opening a Friendly Visitor Program in Fort Lauderdale and a Care Management and Emergency Fund Support Program in Miami.

== Social Enterprise ==
SAGECare In 2017 SAGE founded the Social Enterprise SAGECare, a fee-for-service training and consulting company. The company offers training courses on Creating Inclusive Communities, Home Care of LGBTQ+ Older Adults and several specific topics related to LGBTQ+ older adults.

== Publications ==
SAGE has been involved in the following publications which have been helpful in garnering media coverage about the circumstances of LGBTQ+ older people:

- Long-Term Care Equality Index 2023 Executive Summary
- So You Want to Build LGBTQ+ Inclusive Housing
- Supporting Your LGBTQ+ Grandchild
- Strengthen Your State and Local Aging Plan: A Practical Guide for Expanding the Inclusion of LGBT Older Adults
- Understanding Issues Facing LGBTQ+ Older Adults
- Dignity Denied: Religious Exemptions and LGBT Elder Services
- Caregiving in the LGBT Community
- Improving the Lives of LGBT Older Adults
- Outing Age 2010: Public Policy Issues Affecting Lesbian, Gay, Bisexual and Transgender (LGBT) Elders
- Out & Visible: The Experiences and Attitudes of LGBT Older Adults, Ages 45–75
