= The Meaning of Matthew =

2009 memoir by Judy Shepard

The Meaning of Matthew: My Son's Murder in Laramie, and a World Transformed
- First edition
- Author: Judy Shepard
- Genre: Biography
- Publisher: Hudson Street Press
- Publication date: 2009
- Publication place: United States
- ISBN: 1-59463-057-7

The Meaning of Matthew: My Son's Murder in Laramie, and a World Transformed is a 2009 memoir about the life of Matthew Shepard, written by his mother, Judy Shepard. The book was published by Hudson Street Press on September 3, 2009, and was featured as a New York Times best-seller for the week of September 27, 2009.

== Critical reception ==
In a review for The Houston Chronicle, Elizabeth Kennedy commented on the imagery and specific details of the memories put forth by Judy Shepard, stating that the book was a "unalloyed memoir of remarkable clarity and restraint", adding that, "As plainspoken and unassuming as this memoir is, the scenes from the life interrupted are indelible". Aly Semigran for Entertainment Weekly gave the memoir an "A" rating, noting that, "Shepard writes with unwavering honesty, devoting the right amount of time to each part of her story." Kathi Isserman, writing for Curve Magazine, said that the memoir was "raw, honest and real, with some surprising new details never before published". In another later review for Curve Magazine, Isserman added that Shepard doesn't "sugarcoat her son's life in this starkly honest memoir" and that "the reader also learns much about Matthew's imperfect life as a son, brother and young man".
