= Michael Adams (lawyer) =

American attorney

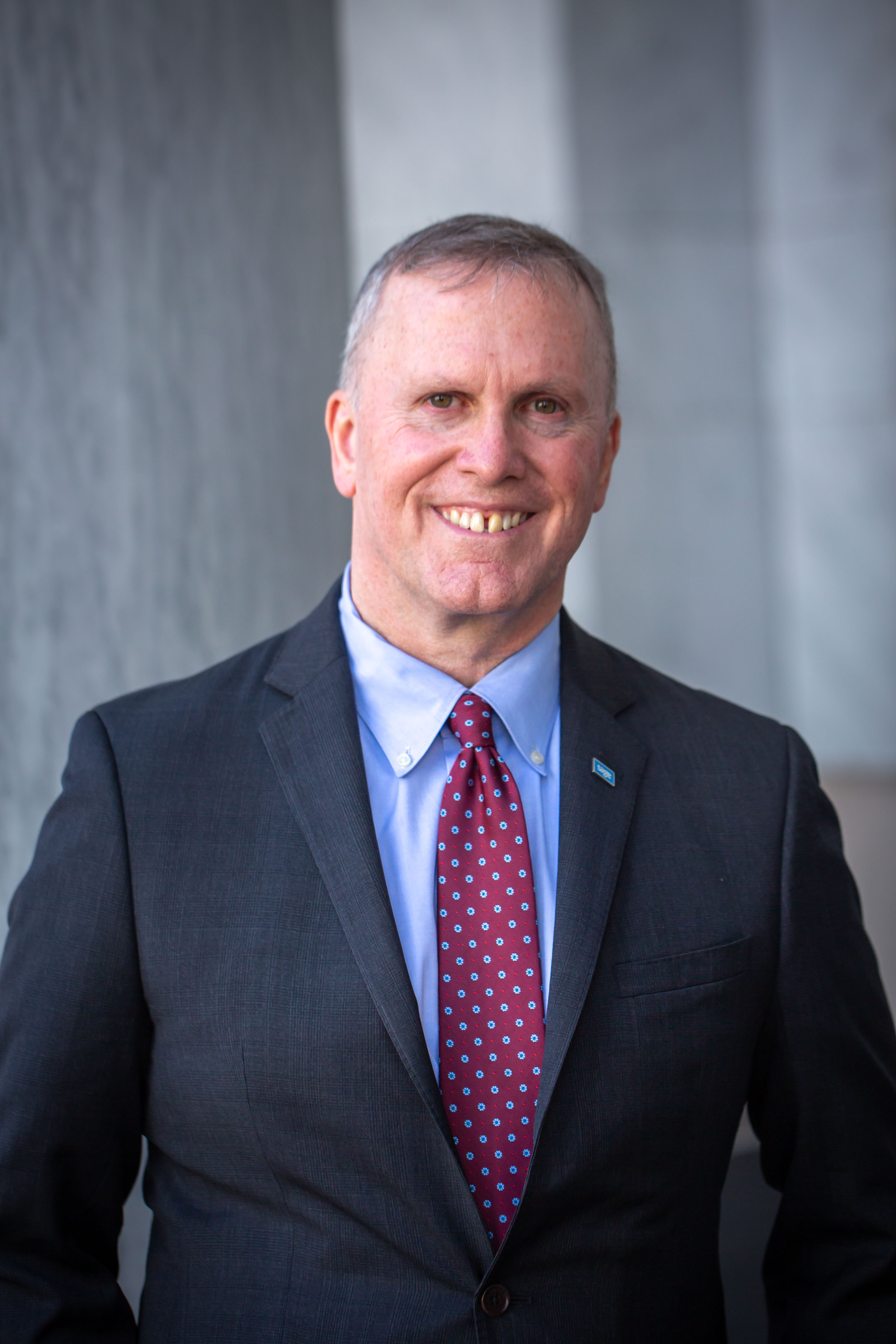
- Born: 1961 (age 64–65); Lowell, Massachusetts
- Education: Harvard University (BA) Stanford University (MA in Latin American Studies) Stanford Law School (JD)
- Occupations: U.S. Attorney and LGBT+ Civil Rights Activist
- Title: CEO of SAGE (Advocacy and Services for LGBT Elders) (since 2006)
- Spouse: Frederick A. Davie (m. 2004)

Michael Adams (born 1961) is an attorney and LGBT+ civil rights advocate in the United States. He was the CEO of Services & Advocacy for GLBT Elders in New York City from 2006 through 2025.

== Early life and education ==
Michael Adams grew up in Lowell, Massachusetts. He earned a bachelor's degree magna cum laude in government from Harvard University in 1984 and his involvement in human rights issues began at this time. He was active in campus campaigns to promote human rights in Latin America and to oppose the then-current United States policies in Central America.

His senior honors thesis adviser was Assistant Professor Terry Karl, who in 1983 filed a sexual harassment complaint against her colleague in the government department, Jorge Dominquez, in what became a groundbreaking case. In 2021, Harvard formally apologized to Karl. Adams spoke out publicly in support of Karl, for which the government department threatened him with legal action.

He earned a Juris Doctor degree from Stanford Law School in 1990 and an MA in Latin American studies from Stanford University.

In 2004, Adams married Frederick A. Davie, his partner since 1998. A Presbyterian minister, Davie is the executive vice president of Union Theological Seminary. He served on President Barack Obama's transition team and was appointed by Obama to the White House Council on Faith-Based and Neighborhood Partnerships. He is currently the Chair of the Civilian Complaint Review Board, which provides civilian oversight to the New York City Police Department, and is a Commissioner of the U.S. Commission on International Religious Freedom, appointed by Senator Charles Schumer.

== Career ==
He worked in litigation at Clarence & Snell in San Francisco, before moving to the American Civil Liberties Union, first as a staff attorney and then as the litigation director of its lesbian & gay rights and AIDS projects. In 2001, he became the deputy legal director of Lambda Legal. Much of his litigation career involved issues affecting LGBTQ+ people and families, such as civil rights and recognition of victims of Nazi persecution.

Adams litigated several cases which ended the enforcement of anti-sodomy laws criminalizing same-sex sexual activity in several jurisdictions. He also argued cases in several states that established "family recognition" for same-sex couples, such as custody and adoption. These cases were argued in Arkansas, Florida, Mississippi, New Jersey, and Virginia.

In 2002, he became Lambda Legal's Director of Education and Public Affairs. In this role, he was responsible for national public relations and community education programs on LGBT+ rights.

Adams served as an adjunct professor at the UC Berkeley School of Law and as a grantmaking consultant to the Ford Foundation in Rio de Janeiro, Brazil.

== SAGE ==
In 2006, Adams became the chief executive officer of the non-profit SAGE (Advocacy and Services for LGBT Elders). Established in 1978, SAGE provides advocacy, supportive services, and consumer resources to older LGBT+ adults. The organization's emphasis is on policy advocacy and promoting legislation that promotes the ability of LGBT+ adults to age with dignity and respect. In 2014 SAGE undertook a multi-year project to embed racial equity in its external work and within the organization as part of a long-term commitment to build racial equity and contribute to the dismantling of white supremacy.

SAGE also provides cultural competency training to health care and nursing care providers with a SAGECare credential and in partnership with the Human Rights Campaign Foundation, it sponsors a Long-Term Care Equality Index to measure the level of equitable and inclusive care for LGBT+ people in long-term care residences. It has a number of initiatives addressing specific issues of LGBT+ elders, including the National Resource Center on LGBT+ Aging, an HIV/AIDS long-term survivors network, an emergency hot-line and telephone support system, and a national housing initiative.

== Advocacy ==
A significant focus of Adams's work is on intersectionality and racial equity. SAGE is a founder of the Diverse Elders Coalition, which comprises six national advocacy organizations representing and advocating for the combined interests and concerns of racially and ethnically diverse elders, older American Indians and Alaska Natives, and lesbian, gay, bisexual and/or transgender (LGBT) elders. Adams has stated that this focus is important not only because there are shared issues among the groups and combining forces is strategically effective, but also because, as the demographic of older Americans changes, people on the intersections of diversity are a growing part of SAGE's constituency.

Adams also has been active in international issues. In 2017, he was part of a delegation testifying before the Inter-American Commission on Human Rights and has become an active member of a coalition working with LGBT+ elders in Latin America. SAGE has worked with several organizations in Latin America and Asia to secure funding for cross-cultural advocacy, services, and research. This focus is informed in part from Adams's previous experience and academic training in Latin American studies.

== Honors and awards ==
Adams is the board chair of the American Society on Aging. He is the 2019 recipient of the National Council on Aging’s Change Agent Award. In 2016, he was named an “Influencer in Aging” by PBS's Next Avenue. Adams has twice been named one of the “100 most influential LGBT leaders” by OUT Magazine'. He has served as the vice president of the board of directors of LiveOn New York. He has served on advisory councils for AARP and the New York City Department for the Aging.

== Publications ==
Michael Adams's publications include (partial list):

- Adams, Michael. “Rural LGBTQ+ elders deserve our support.” McKnights Senior Living (12 Dec. 2022).
- Adams, Michael. “Defending democracy matters deeply for diverse older Americans.” Washington Blade (8 Nov. 2022).
- Adams, Michael. “LGBTQ History Month – Using Our Past to Define Our Future.” Next Avenue (26 Oct. 2022).
- Adams, Michael and Jennifer Wong. “Let’s Revolutionize Spaces Serving Older Adults.” Next Avenue (29 Sep. 2022)
- Adams, Michael and Yanira Cruz. “Inflation Reduction Act: An Important Step Supporting LGBTQ+ Elders.” The Advocate (6 Sep. 2022).
- Adams, Michael. “Addressing Access and Inclusion for LGBTQ+ Older Adults in Long-Term Care Communities and Older Adult Housing.” JAMDA (1 Sep. 2022).
- Adams, Michael. “How Senior Living Facilities Can Be More Inclusive.” Seniors Housing Business (2 May 2022).
- Albino, José and Michael Adams. “Why a White-Led LGBTQ+ Org and a POC-Led Queer Group Are Teaming Up.” The Advocate (1 Apr. 2022).
- Adams, Michael. “Time is ticking on Equality Act for LGBTQ elders.” Washington Blade (2 Mar. 2022).
- Adams, Michael. “Committing to the Fight Against Structural Ageism.” Generations (1 Dec. 2021).
- Adams, Michael. “Fighting for equality for decades, trans elders still face endless hardships.” Washington Blade (19 Nov. 2021).
- Bonamici, Suzanne and Michael Adams. “LGBTQ+ elders endured decades of discrimination. Now, the Stonewall generation needs help.” USA Today (14 Sep. 2021).
- Adams, Michael and Yanira Cruz. “BIPOC, LGBTQ+ Seniors Cannot Wait Any Longer for COVID Vaccine.” The Advocate (24 Jan. 2021).
- Adams, Michael and Peter Kaldes. “Anti-Racism and Pro-Aging: A Stonewall Legacy.” The Hill, (July 23, 2020).
- Adams, Michael. “Individual Heroism Propels LGBTQ Elders in COVID-19.” Next Avenue (14 Apr. 2020).
- Adams, Michael. “SAGE, Serving LGBTQ Elders, Is in the Second Fight of Its Life.” The Advocate (26 Mar. 2020).
- Adams, Michael. “LGBT Older Adults in Latin America: An Emerging Movement.” ReVista: Harvard Review of Latin America, (December 7, 2019).
- Adams, Michael. “Pushing for Equality: LGBTQ+ Elders Need Discrimination-Free Access to Care in Community.” Aging Today (7 Jun. 2019).
- Adams, Michael. “LGBTQ Elders Made Our Lives Possible—Now We Must Care for Them.” The Advocate (15 Apr. 2019).
- Adams, Michael. “Disrupting Loneliness.” The Advocate (November 22, 2017).
- Adams, Michael. “Services and Care for LGBT Elders: An Intersectional Approach.” Generations, Journal of the American Society on Aging. (Summer 2016).
- Adams, Michael. “Connecting the Dots Creates New Leadership.” Gay City News (20 Aug. 2015)
- Adams, Michael. “Time for New York to Support Those Giving Care.” Gay City News (15 Mar. 2015).
- Adams, Michael. “For LGBT Retirees and Their Allies, Volunteer Opportunities Abound!” In 65 Things To Do When You Retire, ed. Mark Evan Chimsky. (South Portland, ME: Sellers Publishing, 2012.
- Adams, Michael. “A Question of Identity.” The Gerontologist. Vol. 51:6 (December 2011).
- Adams, Michael. “Reflections on Advancing an LGBT Aging Agenda.” Public Policy & Aging Report (National Academy on an Aging Society) (Summer 2011).
- Adams, Michael. “Getting to Neutral on Aging Policy.” The Gay & Lesbian Review Worldwide, Vol. 17, Issue 2 (1 Jan. 2010).
- Sullivan, Dwight H., Michael Adams, and Martin H. Schreiber, II (1999) "The Legalization of Same-Gender Sexual Intimacy in Maryland." University of Baltimore Law Forum: Vol. 29: No. 2, Article 3.
