= Shane Meier =

Canadian actor (born 1977)

- Born: June 11, 1977 (age 49); Saskatoon, Saskatchewan, Canada
- Occupation: Actor
- Years active: 1988–2009

Shane Thomas Meier (born June 11, 1977) is a Canadian former actor, best known for playing the title role in The Matthew Shepard Story, a TV film about the life and murder of Matthew Shepard.

== Life and career ==
Meier was born in Saskatoon, Saskatchewan, the son of Jane Weir and John Meier. He is represented in both Canada and the United States. He has appeared in more than 50 other films and television programs, including MacGyver; Walker, Texas Ranger; and Psych. In 2003, Meier won the Screen Idol Award for "Best Performance by an Actor in a Leading Role" for his portrayal of Matthew Shepard in The Matthew Shepard Story.

Meier also runs and operates a men's clothing store called Goodlad Clothing in Vancouver, Canada. Goodlad was named after his great-grandfather James Goodlad. Meier is also the founder and co-owner of Nobles Point Entertainment which he started with his younger brother Ashley Meier.

In animation, he voiced Willy DuWitt in Bucky O'Hare and the Toad Wars and Lancer in My Little Pony Tales as well as additional characters in Captain N: The Game Master.

== Filmography ==
=== Film ===
- My Life as a Babysitter (1990, TV Movie) as Ben
- Unforgiven (1992) as Will Munny Jr.
- Stay Tuned (1992) as Yogi Beer
- Impolite (1992) as Boy #2
- Needful Things (1993) as Brian Rusk
- Andre (1994) as Steve Whitney
- Man of the House (1995) as Big Kid At School No. 2
- Magic in the Water (1995) as Kid with Earrings (Uncredited)
- The Quest (1996) as 'Red'
- Warriors of Virtue (1997) as Toby (voice)
- Silver Wolf (1999, TV Movie) as Jesse McLean
- The Matthew Shepard Story (2001) as Matthew Shepard
- A Date with Darkness (2003, TV Movie) as Daniel
- Shred (2008) as Spinks
- Revenge of the Boarding School Dropouts (2009) as Spinks

=== Television ===
- MacGyver (1990) as Boy / Young MacGyver
- Mom P.I. (1990) as Ray Sullivan
- 21 Jump Street (1990) as Ozzy Smith Fan
- Diagnosis: Murder (1992) as Paul McKinney
- The Ray Bradbury Theater (TV series) (Lets Play Poison) (1992) as Charles Scott Jones
- The Commish (1992–1995) as Mark Sullivan / Peter Brooks
- The Odyssey (1992) as Ling-Ling
- Madison (1993) as Paul Devries
- Lonesome Dove: The Series (1994) as Henry
- Road to Avonlea (1995) as Louie
- The Outer Limits (1995–1997) as Young Kevin / Mark
- Gone in a Heartbeat (1996) as David
- Walker, Texas Ranger (1997–1998) as Thomas "Tommy" Joseph Malloy
- Beyond Belief: Fact or Fiction (1998) as Kid
- Sons of Thunder (1999) as Thomas "Tommy" Joseph Malloy
- Dead Man's Gun (1999) as Andy
- 7th Heaven (1999) as Joe (3.21; 3.22)
- Stargate SG-1 (2000) as Garan
- Mysterious Ways (2000) as Mark Craven
- Call of the Wild (2000) as Miles Challenger
- Tru Calling (2003) as Sam
- The 4400 (2004) as Glen Keating
- Stargate Atlantis (2004) as Neleus
- Supernatural (2005) as Craig Thursten
- Saved (2006) as Tyler
- Psych (2006) as Kirk
- Intelligence (2006-2007) as Phil Coombs

=== Voice actor ===
- The Ultimate Teacher (1988) as Additional Voices
- Camp Candy (1989) as Young Camper
- Captain N: The Game Master (1989) as Additional Voices
- Bucky O'Hare and the Toad Wars! (1991) as Willy DuWitt
- My Little Pony Tales (1992) as Lancer
- Warriors of Virtue (1997) as Toby
- Stories From My Childhood (1998) as Miscellaneous Characters
- My Scene: Jammin' In Jamaica (2004) as Ellis
- My Scene: Masquerade Madness (2004) as Ellis
- My Scene Goes Hollywood: The Movie (2005) as Ellis
