= Angels Would Fall =

1999 single by Melissa Etheridge

Single by Melissa Etheridge

from the album Breakdown
- B-side: "Into the Dark"; "Beloved"
- Released: August 31, 1999
- Studio: Sunset Sound (Hollywood, California)
- Length: 4:39
- Label: Island
- Songwriters: Melissa Etheridge; John Shanks
- Producers: Melissa Etheridge; John Shanks

Melissa Etheridge singles chronology
"Nowhere to Go" (1996)	"Angels Would Fall" (1999)	"Scarecrow" (1999)

"Angels Would Fall" is a song by American musician Melissa Etheridge, released as the first single from her sixth album, Breakdown (1999), on August 31, 1999. The song gave Etheridge her first number-one single on the US Billboard Triple-A chart and peaked at number six in Canada.

== Song information ==
The song was written by Melissa Etheridge with the main guitar loop contributed by John Shanks. It is one of her darkest songs as the singer says herself on the bonus DVD of her album Greatest Hits: The Road Less Traveled:

Breakdown was such a dark period in my life that all the songs were turning out so dark that I even had to go to John Shanks who was producing this album, which was one of his first producing projects [...] but it was a very artistic time and the songs were very moody, very dark, and I finally said: "Look, do you have any pieces of music maybe I can write to? Because I am scraping on the bottom of my soul."

"Angels Would Fall" is about a desperate crush Etheridge had on someone else's girlfriend during her shattered relationship with Julie Cypher. In the verses, she describes the pain she feels because she can tell nobody about her feelings ("The rope that's wrapped around me is cutting through my skin..."), while in the chorus she is singing the desired person's praises ("Angels never came down [...] but if they knew, if they knew you at all, angels would fall...").

== Music video ==
The music video was shot in 1999 and shows Etheridge playing her song in a dark, empty, saloon-styled bar where the furniture is destroyed like after a fight. In retrospective scenes, nebulous images of people in white dresses come down from the ceiling symbolising the fallen angels. While they fall down, they cause the damage described above. These angels find love in each other, both homosexual and heterosexual couples are formed. Towards the end, the door of the bar opens and the angels go into the light.

== Accolades ==
Year	Award	Category	Result	Ref.
2000	Grammy Award	Best Rock Song	Nominated	
2000	Grammy Award	Best Female Rock Vocal Performance	Nominated	

== Track listings ==
All song were written by Melissa Etheridge except "Angels Would Fall", written by Etheridge and John Shanks.

US and Australian CD single

1. "Angels Would Fall"
2. "Into the Dark"
3. "Beloved"

US 7-inch single and European CD single

1. "Angels Would Fall" – 4:17
2. "Into the Dark" – 4:58

== Personnel ==
- Melissa Etheridge – acoustic guitar, vocals
- Kenny Aronoff – drums, marimba, shaker
- Jon Brion – guitar
- Mark Browne – bass
- Matt Chamberlain – drums
- Steve Ferrone – percussion, drums
- Rami Jaffee – keyboard
- Jim Keltner – drums
- Greg Leisz – guitar, mandolin, lap steel guitar, pedals
- Brian MacLeod – percussion, drum loop
- Pino Palladino – bass
- John Shanks – dulcimer, guitar, harp, marimba, background vocals
- Patrick Warren – keyboard
- Gota Yashiki – drum loop

== Charts ==
=== Weekly charts ===
Chart (1999)	Peak position
Australia (ARIA)	59
Canada (Nielsen SoundScan)	16
Canada Top Singles (RPM)	6
Canada Adult Contemporary (RPM)	28
Canada Rock/Alternative (RPM)	5
Germany (GfK)	88
Netherlands (Single Top 100)	61
New Zealand (Recorded Music NZ)	48
Quebec (ADISQ)	4
US Billboard Hot 100	51
US Adult Alternative Airplay (Billboard)	1
US Adult Pop Airplay (Billboard)	9
US Pop Airplay (Billboard)	32

=== Year-end charts ===
Chart (1999)	Position
Canada Top Singles (RPM)	43
Canada Rock/Alternative (RPM)	33
US Adult Top 40 (Billboard)	52
US Triple-A (Billboard)	19

Chart (2000)	Position
US Adult Top 40 (Billboard)	84
