= Breakdown (Melissa Etheridge album) =

Album by singer-songwriter Melissa Etheridge

Studio album by Melissa Etheridge
- Released: October 5, 1999
- Recorded: 1998–1999
- Studio: A&M Studios, Los Angeles, California; Sunset Sound, Los Angeles, California
- Genre: Rock
- Length: 53:50
- Label: Island
- Producer: Melissa Etheridge, John Shanks

Melissa Etheridge chronology
Your Little Secret (1995)	Breakdown (1999)	Skin (2001)

Singles from Breakdown
- 1. "Angels Would Fall" Released: August 31, 1999; 2. "Scarecrow" Released: 1999; 3. "Enough of Me" Released: January 18, 2000; 4. "Stronger Than Me" Released: 2000

Professional ratings
Review scores
Source	Rating
AllMusic	3/5 stars
Entertainment Weekly	C+
Rolling Stone	3.5/5 stars
Uncut	4/5 stars
USA Today	2.5/4 stars

Breakdown is the sixth studio album by American singer-songwriter Melissa Etheridge, released by Island Records on October 5, 1999. A critical and commercial success, the album peaked at No. 12 on the Billboard 200, went Gold, and earned four Grammy Award nominations. A Limited-Edition version of the album was simultaneously released featuring three bonus tracks.

"Scarecrow" is dedicated to the memory of Matthew Shepard, and his family and friends. "Into the Dark" appeared in episodes of Haven and Night Visions.

== Accolades ==
Year	Award	Category	Work	Result	Ref.
2000	GLAAD Media Awards	Outstanding Music Artist	Breakdown	Nominated	
2000	Grammy Awards	Best Rock Album	Breakdown	Nominated	
2000	Grammy Awards	Best Rock Song	"Angels Would Fall"	Nominated	
2000	Grammy Awards	Best Female Rock Vocal Performance	"Angels Would Fall"	Nominated	
2001	Grammy Awards	Best Female Rock Vocal Performance	"Enough of Me"	Nominated	

== Track listing ==
All songs by Melissa Etheridge, except where noted

1. "Breakdown" – 3:54
2. "Angels Would Fall" (Etheridge, Shanks) – 4:39
3. "Stronger Than Me" – 4:08
4. "Into the Dark" – 4:59
5. "Enough of Me" – 4:39
6. "Truth of the Heart" (Etheridge, Shanks) – 4:31
7. "Mama I'm Strange" – 4:29
8. "Scarecrow" – 5:21
9. "How Would I Know" – 4:15
10. "My Lover" – 5:45
11. "Sleep" – 7:10 [standard pressing] / 4:39 [Limited Edition pressing]
12. "Touch and Go"* – 4:36
13. "Cherry Avenue"* – 4:29
14. "Beloved"* – 7:54

* Limited Edition bonus tracks

== Personnel ==
- Melissa Etheridge – acoustic guitar, vocals
- Kenny Aronoff – drums, marimba, shaker
- Jon Brion – guitar
- Mark Browne – bass guitar
- Matt Chamberlain – drums
- Steve Ferrone – percussion, drums
- Rami Jaffee – keyboards
- Jim Keltner – drums
- Greg Leisz – guitar, mandolin, lap steel guitar, pedal steel guitar
- Brian MacLeod – percussion, drum loop
- Pino Palladino – bass guitar
- John Shanks – dulcimer, guitar, harp, marimba, background vocals
- Patrick Warren – keyboards
- Gota Yashiki – programming

== Production ==
- Producers: Melissa Etheridge, John Shanks
- Engineers: Marc DeSisto, Greg Goldman
- Assistant engineers: John Aguto, Tom Nellen, Geoff Walcha
- Mixing: Bob Clearmountain, Tom Lord-Alge, Chris Lord-Alge
- Mastering: Bob Ludwig
- studio technician: Brett Allen
- Art direction: Scott Denton Cardew
- Artwork: Scott Denton Cardew
- Photography: Barbara Green, Rocky Schenck
- Hair stylist: Bernhard Tammé

== Charts ==
Chart (1999)	Peak position
Australian Albums (ARIA)	15
Austrian Albums (Ö3 Austria)	45
Dutch Albums (Album Top 100)	20
German Albums (Offizielle Top 100)	14
Swiss Albums (Schweizer Hitparade)	38
US Billboard 200	12
Canadian Album Chart	6
European Albums (Eurotipsheet)	73

== Certifications ==
Region	Certification	Certified units/sales
United States (RIAA)	Gold	500,000^{^}
^{^} Shipments figures based on certification alone.
