= The Book of Matt =

2013 book about Matthew Shepard by Stephen Jimenez

- Author: Stephen Jimenez
- Original title: The Book of Matt: Hidden Truths About the Murder of Matthew Shepard
- Language: English
- Genre: True crime
- Publisher: Steerforth Press
- Publication date: 2013
- Publication place: United States
- Media type: Print
- Pages: 368

The Book of Matt: Hidden Truths about the Murder of Matthew Shepard is a non-fiction book by journalist Stephen Jimenez. Published by Steerforth Press in 2013, the book is an investigation into the murder of Matthew Shepard. Jimenez was the producer of a 2004 20/20 news program about Shepard's murder. The book argues that the crime was not a hate crime based on Shepard's sexual orientation, but that Shepard was a methamphetamine dealer who knew his killers, and it was a drug transaction gone awry.

The book opens with an author's note, in which Jimenez writes: "Though this is a work of nonfiction journalism, I have occasionally employed methods that are slightly less stringent to re-create the dialogue of characters — words I did not personally hear; nor could the characters themselves recall every word exactly from memory".

== Reception ==
The book was highly controversial upon publication and has been the subject of much criticism.

In The Nation, JoAnn Wypijewski praised the book, noting that "Jimenez does not polemicize or tread deeply into the psyches of the main figures. Rather, he explores the drug-fueled world they inhabited, and evokes its thick air of violence." James Kirchick in The Wall Street Journal stated that the book reads more like a "Mountain West Rashomon than a conclusive journalistic brief," and concluded that "we will likely never know what truly transpired on that evil Wyoming night." Andrew Gumbel, in The Guardian, noted that "Jimenez is also careful to point out that his goal is understand Shepard as a complex human being and make the fullest possible sense of his murder, not to suggest in any way that he deserved his horrific fate. 'We have enshrined Matthew’s tragedy as passion play and folktale,' he writes, 'but hardly ever for the truth of what it was, or who he was – much to our own diminishment.'

The Southern Poverty Law Center (SPLC) denounced the book and its claims as "sensational, and utterly unproven", noting that "Jimenez’s account omits central pieces of evidence which established clearly that it was no mere theory that McKinney had committed an anti-gay hate crime," including evidence that was produced at the time establishing McKinney’s bias motivation. They also further found the central premise of Jimenez's argument to be fundamentally flawed and based in a misunderstanding of the nature of hate crimes: "All bias crimes in fact are acts (including, say, robbery) which are already crimes but which are committed with a bias motive. More to the point, the presence of drugs as a factor doesn’t negate the concurrent presence of a bias motive."

The SPLC was also critical of the original 20/20 segment from 2004, stating "ABC News failed to reveal to its viewers that Jimenez was a longtime friend of the defense attorney for McKinney co-defendant Russell Henderson who, when he pitched the story to ABC producers, had already reached his sensational conclusions — long before ABC’s reporters had begun doing actual investigative work." They also noted that right-wing pundits seeking to discredit anti-gay hate crime laws had embraced Jimenez's work.

Luke Brinker of Media Matters was similarly critical, writing "Undaunted by the questionable practices that tainted Jimenez's earlier work on Shepard, right-wing media have heralded the arrival of The Book of Matt. The dominant narrative among conservative media figures holds that Jimenez has proven once and for all that the longstanding understanding of Shepard's death – and the anti-hate crimes legislation it helped spawn – were built on one big lie", but that in reality, "the preponderance of evidence indicates that anti-gay bias was central to Shepard's murder".

Alyssa Rosenberg in ThinkProgress wrote the book was poorly sourced, stating: "by not distinguishing which quotations are manufactured from recollections, which are paraphrases recounted by sources, and which were spoken directly to him", and criticized most of the major aspects of the book. For example, she notes that most of the sources concerning Shepard's alleged drug dealing remained suspect or otherwise unsubstantiated. "Jimenez never qualifies how credible the sources are, or validates their closeness to Shepard, or evaluates the potential motivations for their accounts", she wrote.

Some police officials interviewed after Jimenez's book's publication disputed some of the claims made in the book. Dave O'Malley, the Laramie police commander over the investigations division at the time of Shepard's murder, said the idea that Shepard was "a methamphetamine kingpin is almost humorous. Someone that would buy into that certainly would believe almost anything they read." Other police, such as the officer who found the murder weapon, believed it was a drug-related killing.

Rob Debree, lead sheriff's investigator at the time, said the book contains "factual errors and lies," and deemed Jimenez's claim that Shepard was a drug dealer "truly laughable."

The Matthew Shepard Foundation, in a statement issued in response to the book, said, "Attempts now to rewrite the story of this hate crime appear to be based on untrustworthy sources, factual errors, rumors and innuendo rather than the actual evidence gathered by law enforcement and presented in a court of law. We do not respond to innuendo, rumor or conspiracy theories. Instead we recommit ourselves to honoring Matthew’s memory, and refuse to be intimidated by those who seek to tarnish it."
