= If Thousands =

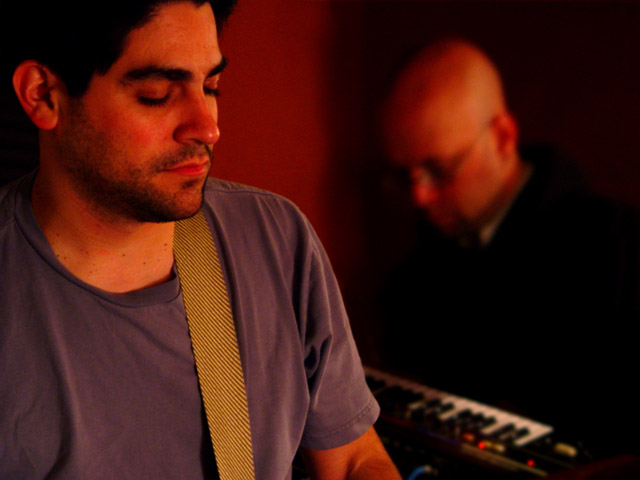
- If Thousands during the "I Have Nothing" sessions.

Background information
- Origin: Duluth, Minnesota, US
- Genres: Drone, trance, ambient
- Instrument(s): Vocals, guitar, organ,
- Years active: Since 2000
- Labels: Silber Records, Dreamlan Recordings, Finding Datura Records, Ambolthue Records, Chairkickers' Union Music
- Members: Christian McShane; Aaron Molina
- Website: www.ifthousands.net

If Thousands is an American drone band from Duluth, Minnesota. Since releasing their debut album "Candice Recorder" in 2001, the band has toured the US with Low. If Thousands' music has been featured on NPR. Christian McShane also performed with Charlie Parr in the band Devil's Flying Machine. Aaron Molina was previously part of the rock band Small Engine City. Nathan Amundson of Rivulets performed on their album Yellowstone.

In a Dreamland Recordings interview McShane explained the purpose and origin If Thousands, "The idea that we started with was to relax people. To relax them to a point where they are drooling."

Elegy, a 25-hour drone in honor of artist Michael Lenz, encouraged cathartic release through unyielding drone. If Thousands' ethic of relaxation found similar form in Slumber, a performance where audience members were encouraged to bring pillows and blankets for the purposes of sleep.

Molina had been in mostly punk bands and was looking for something new. McShane was a classically trained vocalist who was in multiple local bands, as well as forming "Experimental Tuesdays", with Low's Alan Sparhawk – a local event at the Norshor theatre in Duluth, MN in which performers would be encouraged to exhibit experimental works of music, film, dance, or visual art.

If Thousands' foundation rests primarily on electric guitar and the drone of a Hammond M3 organ, which was the only keyboard McShane could afford when they first began. His only other keyboard was a MicroMoog synthesizer he found discarded in a snow bank in the middle of the Superior National Forest (Superior, Wisconsin). To transport the large, heavy Hammond M3 organ to early performances, they cut it in half and McShane would reassemble it onstage before the performance took place. In one such instance, McShane actually electrocuted himself, but was fine after being revived.

In 2013, they reformed to record an album, entitled "For," and have been active as recently as January 2018, releasing two singles and performing at the fifth annual Drone Not Drones event in Minneapolis.

== Lineup ==
- Aaron Molina — bass, guitar, noises, vocals
- Christian McShane — organ, keyboards, piano, theremins, cello, Erhu, accordion, guitar, circuit benders, noises.

== Discography ==
=== Studio albums ===
- Candice Recorder – (Sirsumcorda, 2001)
- Io – (Self-Released, 2002)
- Lullaby – (Silber Records, 2003)
- Yellowstone – (Chairkickers' Union Music, 2003)
- 2d (Collaboration with A Whisper in the Noise) – (Co-Released, 2004)
- GREYSTONE AT SEA – (Dreamland Recordings' Australia 2005)
- I Have Nothing – (Silber Records, 2005)
- For – (self release, 2014) (Silber records)

=== Compilations ===
- "In Return" – (NotOnLabel Records, 2002)
- "Songs for the End of the World" – (Silber Records, 2002)
- Sunshine Comes Slowly Through My Window – (Finding Datura Records, 2003)
- Who Killed Cock Robin? – (ELF Films, 2004)
- Winter Wishes – (Silber Records, 2004)
- Drones, Loves, Honesties, Sounds – (Silber Records, 2006)
- Kaleidescopic #6 – (Ambolthue Records, 2007)

=== Films ===
- "Who Killed Cock Robin?" (film by Travis Wilkerson) – (Extreme Low Frequency, 2005)
- "Strange Nature" (film by Jim Ojala) – (Ojala Productions, 2009)
