= Andy Paris =

Actor and a writer

Andy Paris is an actor and a writer.

== Early life ==
Paris is from Cincinnati, Ohio, where he graduated from The Seven Hills School in 1989.

== Career ==
Paris and other members of the Tectonic Theater Project wrote The Laramie Project (both the play and the screenplay). Along with the other writers of the screenplay, he was nominated for an Emmy in 2002 for Outstanding Writing for a Miniseries, Movie or a Dramatic Special. Additionally, he played the part of Stephen Belber in The Laramie Project. He also played a small role in "Crimebusters", the thirteenth episode of the nineteenth season of Law & Order.
