= Matthew Shepard Foundation =

LGBTQ rights group

- Founded: December 1998
- Founder: Dennis and Judy Shepard
- Type: 501(c)(3)
- Tax ID no.: 31-1640047
- Location: Casper, Wyoming
- Key people: Judy Shepard (Board president)
- Budget: Revenue: $732,891; Expenses: $774,774 (FYE June 2016)
- Website: www.matthewshepard.org

The Matthew Shepard Foundation is an LGBTQ nonprofit organization, headquartered in Casper, Wyoming, which was founded in December 1998 by Dennis and Judy Shepard in memory of their son, Matthew, who was murdered in 1998. The Foundation runs education, outreach, and advocacy programs.

== Programs ==
The Matthew Shepard Foundation has online and offline programs designed to raise awareness of anti-violence and promote human dignity for everyone by engaging schools, companies, and individuals in dialogues.

=== Laramie Project support ===
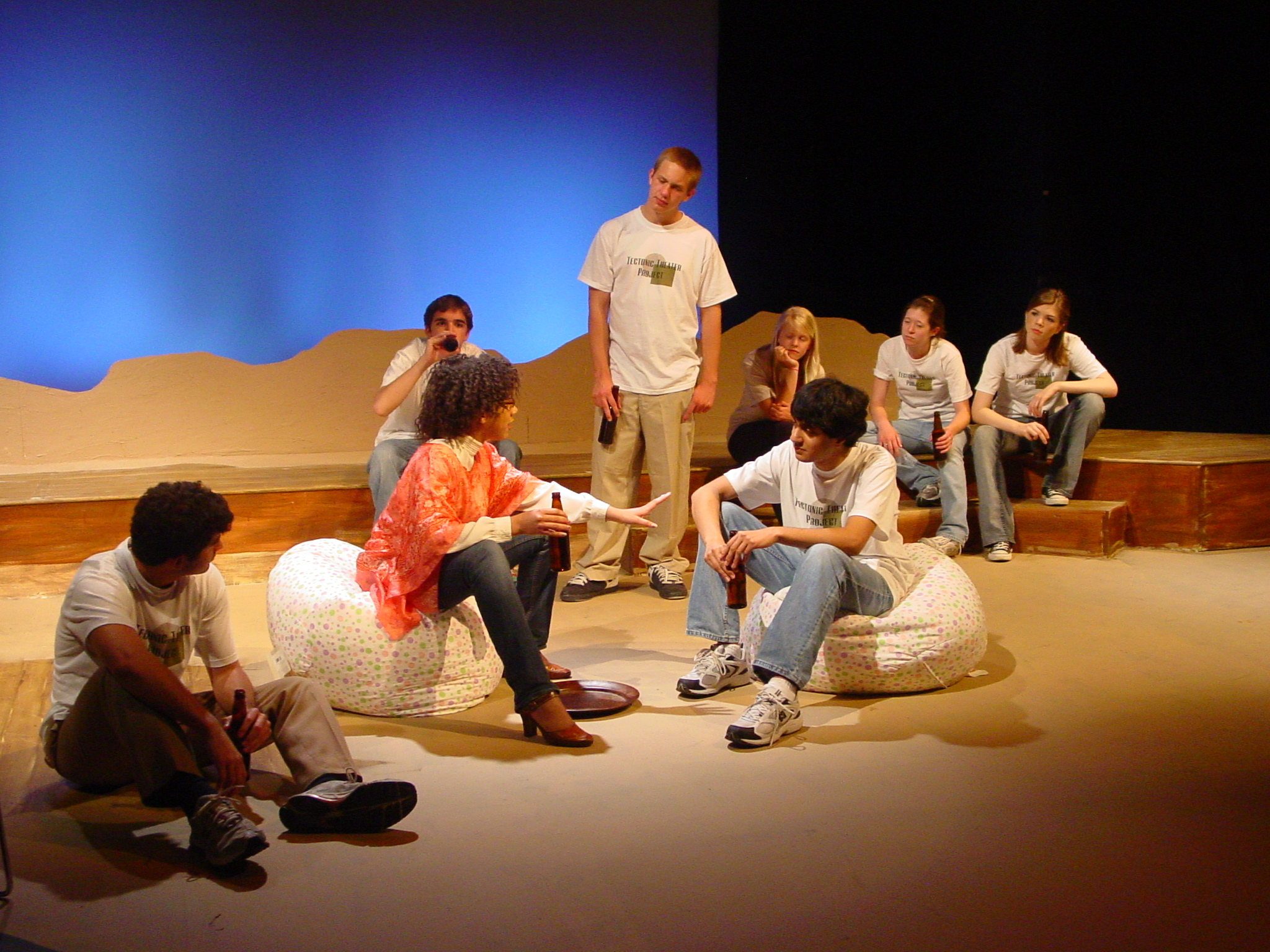
A group scene from a 2008 performance of The Laramie Project at Mary Institute and St. Louis Country Day School

The Laramie Project is a play created in the aftermath of Matthew's 1998 murder. The Matthew Shepard Foundation works with companies, colleges and universities, high schools, community theatres, and religious groups to provide a variety of services including media resources, historical background and context, creative consultation, and assistance with school curriculums related to the play. The organization has worked with productions all across the United States, as well as Canada, Australia, France, and the United Kingdom. They work in collaboration with the play’s creators, Tectonic Theater Project, and travels to different communities to lead post-show discussions, teach, and serve as a panelist for related community-wide discussions on creating safer communities.

=== Matthew’s Place ===
Matthew’s Place is an online community designed to provide support to teenagers and young adults within sexual orientation and gender identity minorities as well as their allies. The website also provides blogs written by young people from across the United States, resources for those who are struggling with coming out or reconciling their faith and sexual orientation/gender identity, and interviews with notable people within the LGBTQ and ally community.

=== Public speaking ===
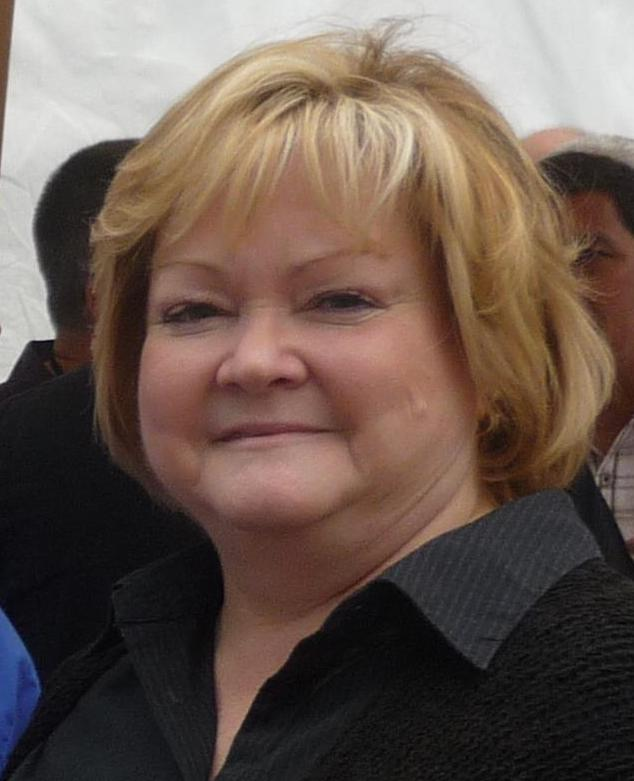
Judy Shepard at Lifeworks Live Out Loud

The Matthew Shepard Foundation's Speakers Bureau programs send anti-violence awareness speakers to visit schools, universities, colleges, companies, and community groups around the United States to talk about the impact hate has on communities. The group of speakers includes journalists, authors, activists, and public safety officials. Judy Shepard also makes public appearances to tell Matthew's story and discuss LGBTQ advocacy.

=== Safe schools resources ===
The Matthew Shepard Foundation provides resources to help teachers, administrators and support staff make their schools safer places for students.

=== Small Bear Big Dreams ===
Small Bear Big Dreams is a Pre-K – 12th grade educational program started in fall 2007 which is designed to teach the values of respect for all people and acceptance of individual differences. The life of Matthew Shepard is chronicled in the storybook Small Bear, Big Dreams. In the book, teddy bears celebrate Matthew’s life and aspirations as well as his struggles.

=== Spirit of Matthew Award ===
The Spirit of Matthew Award recognizes and honors those who teach diversity, acceptance, and understanding through their words and actions. The Spirit of Matthew Award was established in Matthew’s name in an effort to encourage the desire for change that Matthew showed in his life. Recipients are honored annually at the organizations Bear to Make a Difference Gala Dinner.

== History ==
After their 21-year-old son, Matthew, was murdered in Wyoming in October 1998, Dennis and Judy Shepard set out to try to ensure people recognize the role hate plays in society, and to advocate for anti-violence efforts. They founded the Matthew Shepard Foundation in December 1998 in memory of their son and to advance their goals. Judy served as the executive director from 1999 to 2009 and now serves as president of the organization's governing board.

=== The Matthew Shepard Point Scholarship ===
In 2006 and 2007, the Matthew Shepard Foundation and The Point Foundation have partnered to create the Matthew Shepard Point Scholarship, naming three scholars each year to receive annual college scholarships of $10,000 or more. In addition to the monetary award, the scholars become members of the Matthew Shepard Foundation's Youth Advisory Council. Selection of recipients is based on their "academic achievements, as well as a current involvement with helping advance the LGBTQ community, as well as a demonstrated commitment to helping advance equality in the future."

=== Matthew Shepard and James Byrd Jr. Hate Crimes Prevention Act ===
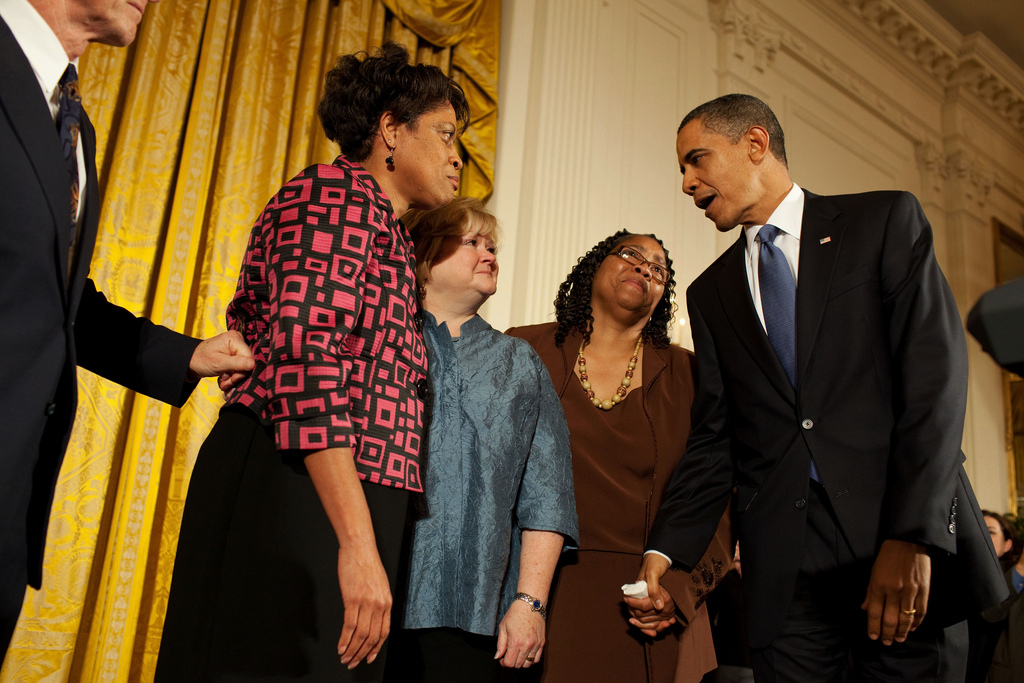
President Barack Obama greets Judy Shepard, center, and Louvon Harris, left, with Betty Byrd Boatner, right, both sisters of James Byrd Jr., at an October 2009 White House reception

Since its founding, the organization lobbied for passage of federal, statewide, and local hate crimes prevention legislation. On October 22, 2009, the United States Congress passed the Matthew Shepard and James Byrd Jr. Hate Crimes Prevention Act, also known as the Matthew Shepard Act. The Act of Congress was signed into law by President Barack Obama on October 28, 2009, as a rider to the National Defense Authorization Act for 2010 (H.R. 2647). Conceived as a response to the murders of Matthew Shepard and James Byrd Jr., the measure expands the 1969 United States federal hate-crime law to include crimes motivated by a victim's actual or perceived gender, sexual orientation, gender identity, or disability.

== See also ==
- Cultural depictions of Matthew Shepard
- The Book of Matt, by Stephen Jimenez
