= Scarecrow (song) =

1999 single by Melissa Etheridge

Single by Melissa Etheridge

from the album Breakdown
- Released: 1999
- Studio: Sunset Sound (Hollywood)
- Genre: Rock
- Length: 5:21
- Label: Island
- Songwriter(s): Melissa Etheridge
- Producer(s): Melissa Etheridge; John Shanks

Melissa Etheridge singles chronology
"Angels Would Fall" (1999)	"Scarecrow" (1999)	"Enough of Me" (2000)

"Scarecrow" is a song by American singer-songwriter Melissa Etheridge from her sixth studio album Breakdown (1999). It was released as a single from the album in 1999, by Island Records. Etheridge is credited as the sole writer of the song, while production was helmed by Etheridge and John Shanks. The song is dedicated in memory of Matthew Shepard.

== Content ==
This ballad tells the story of the kidnapping, torture, and homicide of 21-year-old University of Wyoming student Matthew Shepard, motivated by anti-gay sentiment. The image of a scarecrow was chosen because the bicyclist who found Matthew Shepard, tied to a fence, first thought that he was a scarecrow. The song criticizes hypocritical and deprecatory attitudes towards gay people in media and society.

== Composition ==
"Scarecrow"
A 31-second sample of Melissa Etheridge's "Scarecrow" song where the chorus is played.

According to the sheet music published at Musicnotes.com by Alfred Publishing, the song is written in the key of C major and is set in time signature of common time with a tempo of 88 beats per minute. Etheridge's vocal range spans one octave, from G_{4} to A_{5}.

== Background ==
Etheridge was actually supposed to write a theme song for the US women's soccer team when the news about Matthew Shepard reached the headlines. In her autobiography The Truth Is... she tells that it was "Like somebody just dropped a huge brick in her kitchen" as she realized that being a big gay rock star did not help her changing the world. This led her to supporting some of her friends including Ellen DeGeneres who organized a trip to the Denver hospital. Etheridge also states that Shepherd's death made her especially sad since he looked like a gay friend of hers in high school which made her "cry uncontrollably".

== Credits and personnel ==
Credits and personnel are adapted from the Breakdown album liner notes.

- Melissa Etheridge – writer, vocals, acoustic guitar, fuzz guitar, producer
- John Shanks – guitars, producer
- Mark Browne – bass
- Patrick Warren – keyboards
- Kenny Aronoff – drums, shaker
- Chris Lord-Alge – mixing
- Neal Avron – engineer
- Geoff Walcha – assistant engineer
- Bob Ludwig – mastering

== Literature ==
- Melissa Etheridge and Laura Morton: The truth is...', Random House 2002
