= Dennis Shepard =

American LGBTQ rights activist (born 1954)

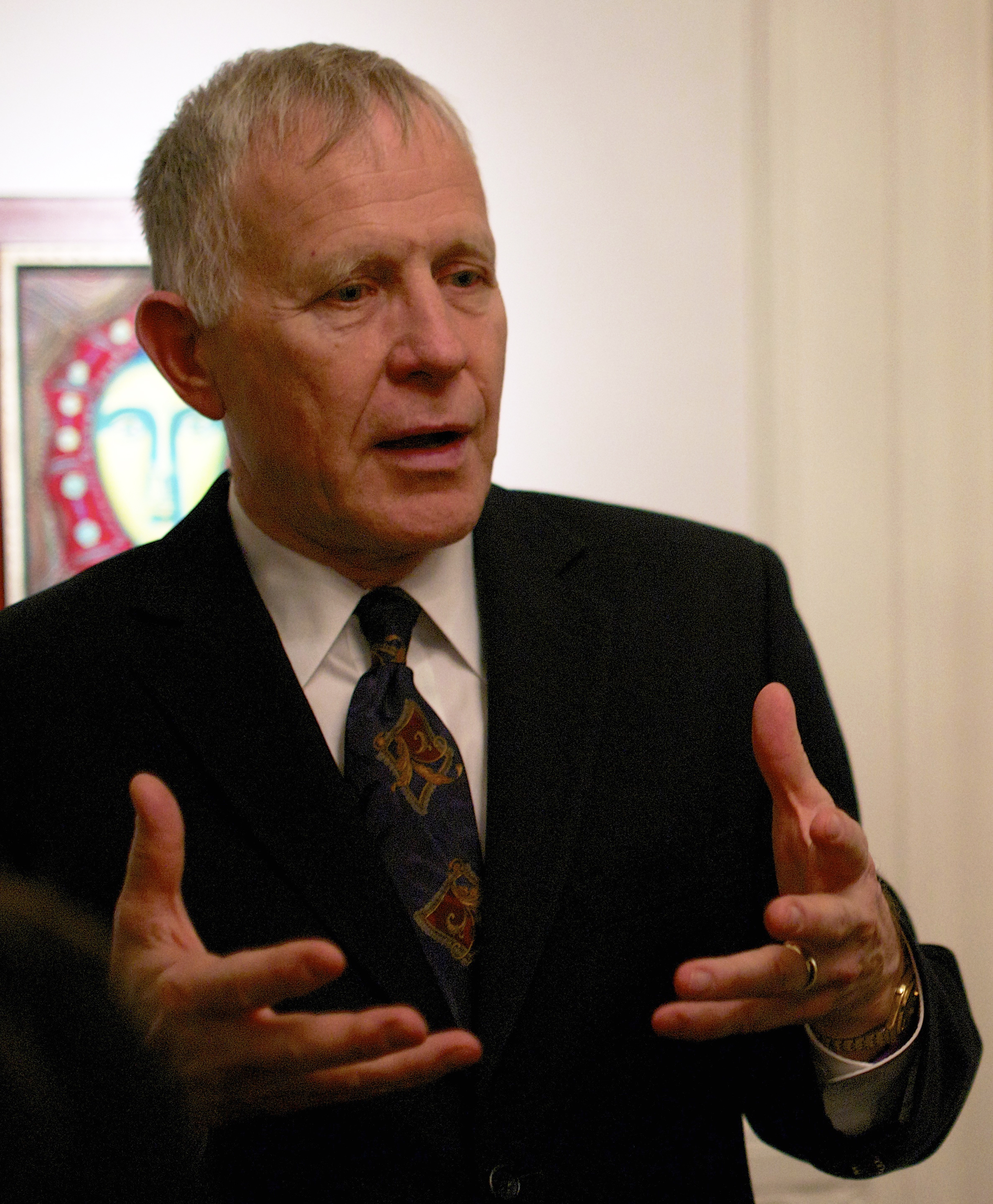
- Shepard during his visit to Sweden in December 2013
- Born: November 1954 (age 71); Scottsbluff, Nebraska, U.S.
- Education: University of Wyoming
- Occupation: Oil industry safety engineer
- Spouse: Judy Shepard (m. 1973)
- Children: Matthew Shepard (1976–1998); Logan Shepard (b. 1981)

Dennis Shepard (born November 1954) is the father of Matthew Shepard, a 21-year-old student at University of Wyoming who was murdered in October 1998 in what became one of the most high-profile hate crimes against LGBTQ people in the United States. He and his wife, Judy Shepard, are co-founders of the Matthew Shepard Foundation, and advocate for LGBT rights. He has been an advocate for parental support of LGBTQ children both during Matthew's life and, very publicly, since Matthew's death. He and Judy continue to live and work in Casper.

== Personal life ==
Born in Scottsbluff, Nebraska, Shepard earned a degree in education from the University of Wyoming before marrying Judy in 1973 and moving to Casper, Wyoming, in 1976. While they have also resided in Saudi Arabia, they have since returned to Casper, where they currently work and reside. Dennis is the father of two sons, Matthew Wayne Shepard (1976–1998) and Logan Shepard (born 1981).

== Career ==
Shepard was an oil industry safety engineer, Dennis worked for more than 16 years in safety operations for Saudi Aramco in Dhahran, Saudi Arabia, before retiring from that position in 2009.

== Advocacy ==
He has served on the Matthew Shepard Foundation board of directors since the organization's inception and currently speaks to audiences around the country, particularly to victims' advocacy organizations and law enforcement audiences about his experiences and the importance of equal treatment of LGBTQ crime victims and their loved ones. On March 20, 2007, the Matthew Shepard Act (H.R. 1592), a bill which would expand federal hate crimes legislation to include sexual orientation, was introduced as federal bipartisan legislation in the U.S. Congress, sponsored by Democrat John Conyers with 171 co-sponsors. Dennis and his wife, Judy, were present at the introduction ceremony. That bill did not pass however, after then-President George W. Bush threatened to veto the bill if it passed. On October 22, 2009, the United States Congress passed the Matthew Shepard and James Byrd, Jr. Hate Crimes Prevention Act, and on October 28, 2009, President Barack Obama signed the legislation into law.

Dennis and his wife Judy announced Wyoming's votes in the roll call at the 2020 Democratic National Convention.

== See also ==
- Cultural depictions of Matthew Shepard
- List of civil rights leaders
