= Matthew Shepard =

American hate crime and murder victim (1976–1998)

- Born: Matthew Wayne Shepard; December 1, 1976; Casper, Wyoming, U.S.
- Died: October 12, 1998 (aged 21); Fort Collins, Colorado, U.S.
- Cause of death: Murder (blunt trauma)
- Resting place: Washington National Cathedral
- Education: University of Wyoming
- Parents: Dennis Shepard; Judy Shepard

Matthew Wayne Shepard (December 1, 1976 – October 12, 1998) was an American student at the University of Wyoming who was beaten, tortured, and left to die near Laramie, Wyoming on October 6, 1998. He was transported by rescuers to Poudre Valley Hospital in Fort Collins, Colorado, where he died six days later from severe head injuries sustained during the attack.

Aaron McKinney and Russell Henderson were arrested shortly after the attack and charged with first-degree murder following Shepard's death. Henderson pleaded guilty to murder, and McKinney was tried and found guilty of murder; each of them received two consecutive life sentences.

Significant media coverage was given to the murder and what role Shepard's sexual orientation played as a motive for the crime, as he was gay. The prosecutor argued the murder of Shepard was premeditated and driven by greed. McKinney's defense counsel countered by arguing that he had intended only to rob Shepard but he killed him in a rage when Shepard made a sexual advance toward him. In a 2009 interview, McKinney said, "The night I did it, I did have hatred for homosexuals" and "he was obviously gay. That played a part. His weakness. His frailty."

Shepard's murder brought national and international attention to hate crime legislation at both the state and federal level. In October 2009, the United States Congress passed the Matthew Shepard and James Byrd Jr. Hate Crimes Prevention Act (commonly the "Matthew Shepard Act" or "Shepard/Byrd Act" for short), and on October 28, 2009, President Barack Obama signed the legislation into law. Following their son's murder, Dennis and Judy Shepard became LGBTQ rights activists and established the Matthew Shepard Foundation. Shepard's life and murder inspired a number of films, novels, plays, songs, and other works, including The Laramie Project (a 2000 play and 2002 film) and Judy Shepard's 2009 memoir The Meaning of Matthew.

== Background ==
Matthew Shepard was born in 1976 in Casper, Wyoming; he was the first of two sons born to Judy (née Peck) and Dennis Shepard. His younger brother, Logan, was born in 1981. The two brothers had a close relationship. Matthew was raised in the Episcopal denomination and had once served as an altar boy in the church. He attended Crest Hill Elementary School, Dean Morgan Junior High School, and Natrona County High School for his freshman through junior years. As a child, he was "friendly with all his classmates", but was targeted and teased due to his small stature and lack of athleticism. He developed an interest in politics at an early age.

During his high school years, Matthew moved with his family to Saudi Arabia, when his father was hired by Saudi Aramco, a Saudi oil and natural gas company. With the family based at the Saudi Aramco Residential Camp in Dhahran, Shepard completed high school in Switzerland, at the American School in Switzerland (TASIS). There, he participated in theater, and took German and Italian courses. In 1995, during a high school trip to Morocco, Shepard was abducted, beaten and raped. This caused him to experience depression and panic attacks, according to his mother. One of Shepard's friends feared that his depression had driven him to become involved with drugs during his time at college. Shepard was hospitalized on a number of occasions due to his clinical depression and suicidal ideation.

After graduating from high school in May 1995, Shepard attended Catawba College in North Carolina and Casper College in Wyoming, before settling in Denver, Colorado. Shepard became a first-year political science major at the University of Wyoming in Laramie with a minor in languages, and was chosen as the student representative for the Wyoming Environmental Council.

Shepard was described by his father as "an optimistic and accepting young man who had a special gift of relating to almost everyone. He was the type of person who was very approachable and always looked to new challenges. Shepard had a great passion for equality and always stood up for the acceptance of people's differences." Michele Josue, who had been Shepard's friend and later created a documentary about him, Matt Shepard Is a Friend of Mine, described him as "a tenderhearted and kind person."

== Murder ==
On the night of October 6, 1998, Shepard was approached by Aaron McKinney and Russell Henderson at the Fireside Lounge in Laramie; all three men were in their early 20s. McKinney and Henderson offered to give Shepard a ride home. They subsequently drove to a remote rural area and proceeded to rob, pistol-whip, and torture Shepard, tying him to a split-rail fence and leaving him to die. It was erroneously reported by the news that he had been tied to a barbed wire fence. Many media reports contained the graphic account of the pistol-whipping and his fractured skull. Reports described how Shepard was beaten so brutally that his face was completely covered in blood, except where it had been partially cleansed by his tears.

The assailants' girlfriends testified that neither McKinney nor Henderson was under the influence of alcohol or other drugs at the time of the attack. McKinney and Henderson testified that they learned of Shepard's address and intended to steal from his home as well. After attacking Shepard and leaving him tied to the fence in near-freezing temperatures, McKinney and Henderson returned to town. McKinney proceeded to attack two men, 19-year-old Emiliano Morales and 18-year-old Jeremy Herrara. The fight resulted in head wounds for both Morales and McKinney. Police officer Flint Waters arrived at the scene of the fight. He arrested Henderson, searched McKinney's truck, and found a blood-smeared gun along with Shepard's shoes and credit card. Henderson and McKinney later tried to persuade their girlfriends to provide alibis for them and help them dispose of evidence.

Still tied to the fence, Shepard was in a coma eighteen hours after the attack when he was discovered by Aaron Kreifels, a cyclist who initially mistook Shepard for a scarecrow. Reggie Fluty, the first police officer to arrive at the scene, found Shepard alive but covered in blood. The medical gloves issued by the Albany County Sheriff's Office were faulty, and Fluty's supply ran out. She decided to use her bare hands to clear an airway in Shepard's bloody mouth. A day later, she was informed that Shepard was HIV-positive and that she might have been exposed to the virus due to cuts on her hands. After taking an AZT regimen for several months, she tested negative for HIV. Judy Shepard later wrote that she learned of her son's HIV status while he lay dying in the hospital.

Shepard was transported first to Ivinson Memorial Hospital in Laramie before being moved to the more advanced trauma ward at Poudre Valley Hospital in Fort Collins, Colorado. He had suffered fractures to the back of his head and in front of his right ear. He experienced severe brainstem damage, which affected his body's ability to regulate his heart rate, body temperature, and other vital functions. There were also about a dozen small lacerations around his head, face, and neck. His injuries were deemed too severe for doctors to operate. He never regained consciousness and remained on full life support. While he lay in intensive care and in the days following the attack, candlelight vigils were held in countries around the world.

Shepard died of his injuries at 12:53 a.m. on October 12, 1998. He was 21 years old.

=== Arrests and trial ===
McKinney and Henderson were arrested and initially charged with attempted murder, kidnapping, and aggravated robbery. After Shepard's death, the charges were upgraded from attempted murder to first-degree murder, which meant that the two defendants were eligible for the death penalty. Their girlfriends, Kristen Price and Chasity Pasley, were charged with being accessories after the fact. At McKinney's November 1998 pretrial hearing, Sergeant Rob Debree testified that McKinney had stated in an interview on October 9 that he and Henderson had identified Shepard as a robbery target and pretended to be gay to lure him out to their truck, and that McKinney had attacked Shepard after Shepard put his hand on McKinney's knee. Detective Ben Fritzen testified that Price stated McKinney told her the violence against Shepard was triggered by how McKinney "[felt] about gays".

In December 1998, Pasley pleaded guilty to being an accessory after the fact to first-degree murder; she served a prison sentence of 15 to 24 months. Pasley died in 2017 at 39 years old. On April 5, 1999, Henderson avoided going to trial when he pleaded guilty to murder and kidnapping charges. In order to avoid the death penalty, he agreed to testify against McKinney and was sentenced by District Judge Jeffrey A. Donnell to two consecutive life terms. At Henderson's sentencing, his lawyer argued that Shepard had not been targeted because he was gay.

McKinney's trial took place in October and November 1999. Prosecutor Cal Rerucha alleged that McKinney and Henderson pretended to be gay to gain Shepard's trust. Price, McKinney's girlfriend, testified that Henderson and McKinney had "pretended they were gay to get [Shepard] in the truck and rob him." McKinney's lawyer attempted to put forward a gay panic defense, arguing that McKinney was driven to temporary insanity by alleged sexual advances by Shepard. This defense was rejected by the judge. McKinney's lawyer stated that the two men wanted to rob Shepard but never intended to kill him. Rerucha argued that the killing had been premeditated, driven by "greed and violence", rather than by Shepard's sexual orientation. The jury found McKinney not guilty of premeditated murder but guilty of felony murder and began to deliberate on the death penalty. Shepard's parents brokered a deal that resulted in McKinney receiving two consecutive life terms without the possibility of parole. Henderson and McKinney were incarcerated in the Wyoming State Penitentiary in Rawlins and were later transferred to other prisons because of overcrowding. Following her testimony at McKinney's trial, Price pleaded guilty to a reduced charge of misdemeanor interference with a police officer. She was sentenced to 180 days in prison, credited with 120 days already served, and had the remaining 60 days suspended.

== Anti-gay protests ==
Members of the Westboro Baptist Church, led by Fred Phelps, received national attention for picketing Shepard's funeral with signs bearing homophobic slogans, such as "Matt in Hell" and "God Hates Fags".

Church members also mounted anti-gay protests during the trials of Henderson and McKinney. In response, Romaine Patterson, one of Shepard's friends, organized a group that assembled in a circle around the Westboro Baptist Church protesters. The group wore white robes and gigantic wings (resembling angels) that blocked the protesters. Despite this, Shepard's parents were able to hear the protesters shouting anti-gay remarks and comments directed toward them. The police intervened and created a human barrier between the two groups.

Angel Action was founded by Patterson in April 1999.

== Subsequent reporting ==
=== 20/20 report ===
Shepard's murder continued to attract public attention and media coverage long after the trial was over. In 2004, the ABC News news program 20/20 aired a report by TV journalist Elizabeth Vargas that quoted statements by McKinney, Henderson, Price, Rerucha, and a lead investigator. The statements said that the murder had not been motivated by Shepard's sexuality but was primarily a drug-related robbery that had turned violent. Price said she had lied to police about McKinney having been provoked by an unwanted sexual advance from Shepard, telling Vargas, "I don't think it was a hate crime at all." Rerucha said, "It was a murder that was once again driven by drugs."

The report was criticized by GLAAD as relying on speculation and statements by unreliable individuals changing their story. Judy Shepard's lawyer described the report as an oversimplification, while Michael Adams of Lambda Legal described it as an attempt to "de-gay the murder".

=== The Book of Matt ===
Stephen Jimenez, the producer of the 2004 20/20 segment, went on to write a book, The Book of Matt: Hidden Truths About the Murder of Matthew Shepard, which was published in September 2013. The book said that Shepard and McKinney—the killer who inflicted the injuries—had been occasional sex partners and that Shepard was a methamphetamine dealer. Jimenez wrote that Fritzen told an interviewer, "Matthew Shepard's sexual preference or sexual orientation certainly wasn't the motive in the homicide...".

Some commentators have criticized Jimenez's views on the attack by classifying them as being sensational and misleading. Other commentators, however, have spoken up to defend them.

Gay rights activist John Stoltenberg, and a supporter of the The Laramie Project, has also written positively about the book, saying that "keeping Matthew as the poster boy of gay-hate crime and ignoring the full tragedy of his story has been the agenda of many gay-movement leaders. Ignoring the tragedies of Matthew's life prior to his murder will do nothing to help other young men in our community who are sold for sex, ravaged by drugs, and generally exploited."

Some law enforcement officials who were involved in the investigation have criticized Jimenez's conclusions, while others said that there was evidence that drugs were an important factor that led to the murder.

== Legacy ==
In the years following her son's death, Judy Shepard has worked as an advocate for LGBTQ rights, particularly issues relating to gay youth. She was a main force behind the Matthew Shepard Foundation, which she and her husband, Dennis, founded in December 1998.

In June 2019, Shepard was one of the inaugural 50 American "pioneers, trailblazers, and heroes" inducted on the National LGBTQ Wall of Honor within the Stonewall National Monument (SNM) in New York City's Stonewall Inn. The SNM is the first U.S. national monument dedicated to LGBTQ rights and history, and the wall's unveiling was timed to take place during the 50th anniversary of the Stonewall riots.

=== Hate crime legislation ===
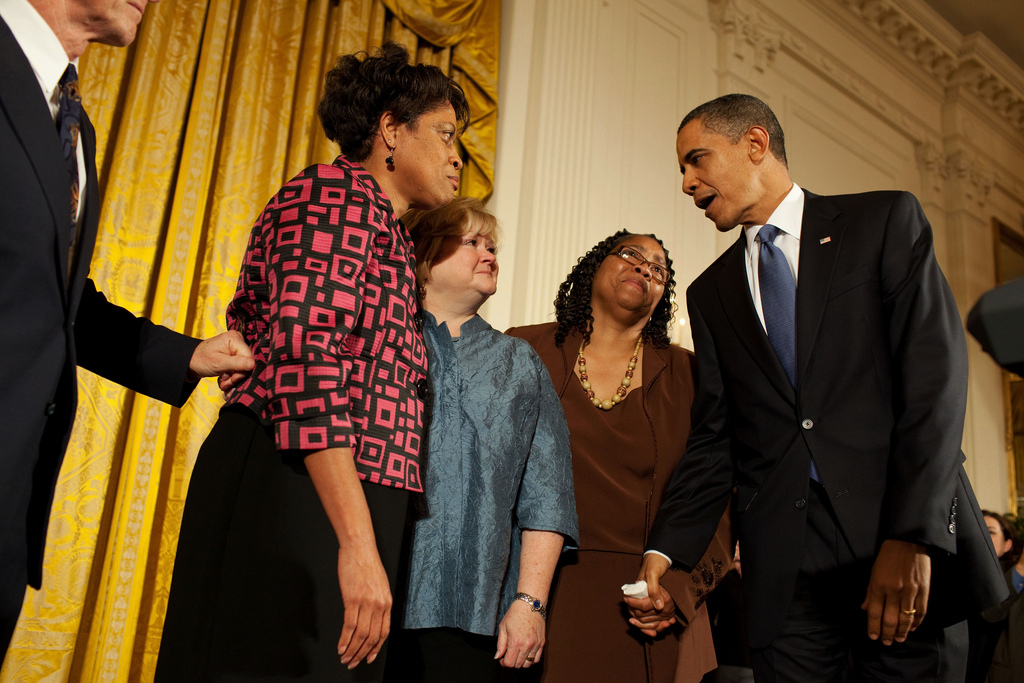
President Barack Obama greets Louvon Harris, left, Betty Byrd Boatner, right, both sisters of James Byrd Jr., and Judy Shepard at a 2009 reception commemorating the enactment of the legislation.

Requests for new legislation to address hate crimes gained momentum during coverage of the incident. Under existing United States federal law and Wyoming state law, crimes committed on the basis of sexual orientation could not be prosecuted as hate crimes.

The day Shepard was discovered, his friends Walt Boulden and Alex Trout began contacting media organizations, spreading the word that Shepard was openly gay and that they were concerned the murder may have been a homophobic attack. According to prosecutor Cal Rerucha, speaking to 20/20 in 2004, "They were calling the County Attorney's office, they were calling the media and indicating Matthew Shepard is gay and we don't want the fact that he is gay to go unnoticed." Boulden linked the attack to the absence of a Wyoming criminal statute providing for a hate crimes charge.

In the following session of the Wyoming Legislature, a bill was introduced that defined certain attacks motivated by a victim's sexual orientation as hate crimes. The measure failed on a 30–30 tie in the Wyoming House of Representatives.

President Bill Clinton renewed attempts to extend federal hate crime legislation to include gay people, women, and people with disabilities. A Hate Crimes Prevention Act was introduced in both the United States Senate and House of Representatives in November 1997, and reintroduced in March 1999, but was passed by only the Senate in July 1999. In September 2000, both houses of Congress passed such legislation; however, it was stripped out in conference committee.

On March 20, 2007, the Matthew Shepard and James Byrd Jr. Hate Crimes Prevention Act (H.R. 1592) was introduced as federal bipartisan legislation in the U.S. Congress, sponsored by Democrat John Conyers with 171 co-sponsors. It would amend the existing federal hate crimes definition and expand it to cover gender, sexual orientation, gender identity, or disability, and require reporting by the FBI of those crimes included in the expansion. Shepard's parents attended the introduction ceremony. The bill passed the House of Representatives on May 3, 2007. Similar legislation passed in the Senate on September 27, 2007 (S. 1105); however, then-President George W. Bush indicated he would veto the legislation if it reached his desk. The Democratic leadership dropped the legislation in response to opposition from conservative groups and Bush, and because the measure was attached to a defense bill there was a lack of support from antiwar Democrats. On December 10, 2007, congressional powers attached bipartisan hate crimes legislation to a Department of Defense Authorization bill, although it failed to pass. Nancy Pelosi, Speaker of the House, said she was "still committed to getting the Matthew Shepard Act passed". Pelosi planned to get the bill passed in early 2008 although she did not succeed. Following his election as president, Barack Obama stated that he was committed to passing the act.

The U.S. House of Representatives debated expansion of hate crimes legislation on April 29, 2009. During the debate, Representative Virginia Foxx of North Carolina called the "hate crime" labeling of Shepard's murder a "hoax". Foxx later called her comments "a poor choice of words". The House passed the act, designated H.R. 1913, by a vote of 249–175. Ted Kennedy, Patrick Leahy, and a bipartisan coalition introduced the bill in the Senate on April 28; it had 43 cosponsors as of June 17, 2009. The Matthew Shepard Act was adopted as an amendment to S.1390 by a vote of 63–28 on July 15, 2009. On October 22, 2009, the Senate passed the act by a vote of 68–29. President Obama signed the measure into law on October 28, 2009.

=== Interment in Washington National Cathedral ===
On October 26, 2018, just over 20 years after his death, Shepard's ashes were interred at the crypt of Washington National Cathedral. The ceremony was presided over by the first openly gay Episcopal bishop Gene Robinson, and the Bishop of Washington the Right Reverend Mariann Edgar Budde. Music was performed by the Gay Men's Chorus of Washington, D.C.; GenOUT; and Conspirare, which performed Craig Hella Johnson's Considering Matthew Shepard. His was the first interment of the ashes of a national figure at the cathedral since Helen Keller's 50 years earlier.

=== In popular culture ===
Matthew Shepard's life, death, trial, and its aftermath have inspired numerous works, including documentary and narrative films and television shows, stage plays (such as The Laramie Project), and musical and written works. Additionally, NBA player Jason Collins wore the jersey number "98" in honor of Shepard during his 2012–13 season with the Boston Celtics and the Washington Wizards, and he would come out as gay following the season. After Collins joined the Brooklyn Nets in 2014, NBA marketing reported high interest in his "98" jersey and high sales once the item became available for purchase.

The Meaning of Matthew: My Son's Murder in Laramie, and a World Transformed, is a 2009 biographical book by Judy Shepard about her son. Judy Shepard speaks about her loss, her family memories of Matthew, and the tragic event that changed the Shepards' lives and America. The Meaning of Matthew follows the Shepard family in the days immediately after the crime to see their incapacitated son, kept alive by life support machines; how the Shepards learned of the huge public response, the candlelit vigils and memorial services for their child; and their struggles to navigate the legal system.

American musician Tori Amos frequently dedicated her 1998 song "Merman" to Shepard, at the request of fans following her tours at the time.

In 1999, American singer-songwriter Melissa Etheridge released the song "Scarecrow" in Shepard's memory, from her sixth studio album Breakdown.

In 2006, American metal band Trivium released the song "And Sadness Will Sear", which was written as a tribute and reminder about Shepard's murder.

== See also ==
- Violence against LGBTQ people
- History of violence against LGBTQ people in the United States
- Murders of Gary Matson and Winfield Mowder – 1999 murder of a gay couple in Redding, California
- Murder of Blaze Bernstein – 2018 murder in Lake Forest, California, US
