= Next Avenue =

American digital news platform

Next Avenue is a digital platform launched by PBS that offers original and aggregated journalism aimed at baby boomers. It is PBS' first venture to begin on the Internet rather than on broadcast television, and was conceived and developed at Twin Cities Public Television (TPT) in St. Paul, Minnesota. The website was launched on May 15, 2012.

In 2015, Next Avenue began publishing an annual list of the top 50 "Influencers in Aging", a recognition of "advocates, researchers, thought leaders, innovators, writers and experts [who] continue to push beyond traditional boundaries and change our understanding of what it means to grow older."
