= Judy Shepard =

American LGBTQ rights activist (born 1952)

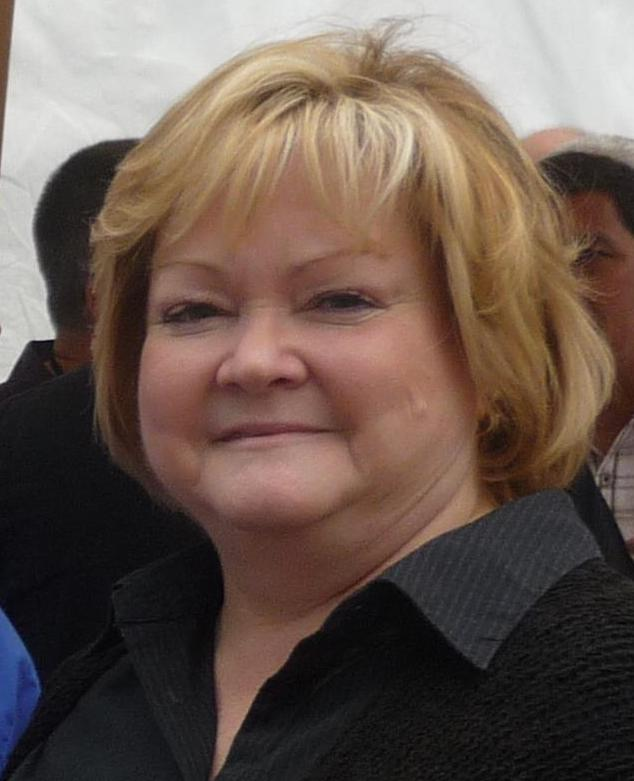
- Shepard in June 2009
- Born: Judy Peck; August 15, 1952 (age 73)
- Occupations: Board President – Matthew Shepard Foundation (1999–present); Executive Director – Matthew Shepard Foundation (1999–2009); LGBT-rights activist
- Spouse: Dennis Shepard (m. 1973)
- Children: Matthew Shepard (1976–1998); Logan Shepard (b. 1981)
- Awards: Presidential Medal of Freedom (2024)

Judy Shepard (née Peck; born August 15, 1952) is the mother of Matthew Shepard, a 21-year-old student at University of Wyoming who was murdered in October 1998. She and her husband, Dennis Shepard, are co-founders of the Matthew Shepard Foundation, and advocate for LGBT rights.

== Personal life ==
Judy and her husband, Dennis Shepard, have lived in Casper, Wyoming (though they have also lived in Saudi Arabia) since 1976. Judy is the mother of two sons, Matthew Wayne Shepard (1976–1998) and Logan Shepard (born 1981).

== Activism ==
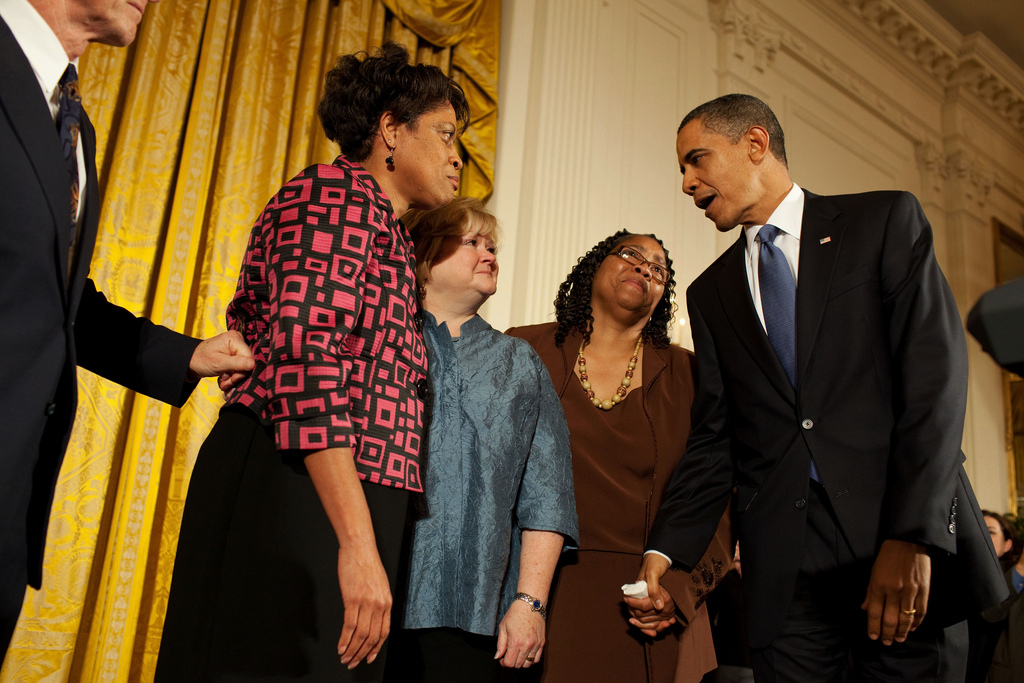
Shepard (center), Louvon Harris (left), Betty Byrd Boatner (right) with President Barack Obama in 2009 to promote the Hate Crimes Prevention Act

On October 6, 1998, Judy's older son Matthew was beaten and pistol whipped in Laramie, Wyoming. Matthew Shepard died six days later at Poudre Valley Hospital in Fort Collins, Colorado, on October 12, 1998, at age 21. It was widely reported by mass media that it was due to him being gay. The incident became one of the defining cases of hate-crimes and was cited for passing hate-crime legislation. In response, Judy Shepard created the Matthew Shepard Foundation. The foundation's purpose is to advance "social justice, diversity awareness and education, and equality for lesbian, gay, bisexual and transgender (LGBT) people".

She is the founding president of the Foundation's Board of Directors, and served as the first executive director from 1999 to 2009. On March 20, 2007, the Matthew Shepard Act (H.R. 1592), a bill which would expand federal hate-crimes legislation to include sexual orientation, was introduced as federal bipartisan legislation in the U.S. Congress, sponsored by Democrat John Conyers with 171 co-sponsors. Judy and her husband Dennis were present at the introduction ceremony. That bill did not pass however, after then-President George W. Bush threatened to veto the bill if it passed.

As of 2009, she is still board president of the foundation, and as a result she travels across the United States speaking to different audiences. In 2009, she published a memoir, The Meaning of Matthew about how her family dealt with his murder, the subsequent court cases, the media coverage, and their work to advance civil rights over the last decade.

In May 2009, Shepard met with President Barack Obama, where he promised her he would help pass the Matthew Shepard Act. There was a controversy when the act was being debated in the House of Representatives, and while Judy Shepard was in the audience, Representative Virginia Foxx, R-N.C., called the allegation that the murder of Matthew Shepard was because of his homosexuality a hoax; later she apologized for this statement.

On October 11, 2009, she addressed a rally for LGBTQ rights in the United States Capitol, at the National Equality March, saying "I'm here today because I lost my son to hate.... No one has the right to tell my son whether or not he can work anywhere. Whether or not he can live wherever he wants to live and whether or not he can be with the one person he loves—no one has that right. We are all Americans. We are all equal Americans, gay, straight or whatever" On the Saturday night before, President Obama addressed the Human Rights Campaign in the Capitol and mentioned his promise to Judy Shepard in the Oval Office, in his reassertion of his commitment to pass legislation important to the LGBTQ community.

On October 22, 2009, the United States Congress passed the Matthew Shepard and James Byrd, Jr. Hate Crimes Prevention Act, and on October 28, 2009, President Obama signed the legislation into law.

Judy and her husband Dennis announced Wyoming's votes in the roll call at the 2020 Democratic National Convention.

== Awards and honors ==
In 2009, Judy Shepard received the Black Tie Dinner Elizabeth Birch Equality Award. The award was presented to Ms. Shepard by Elizabeth Birch, herself, on October 3, 2009, in Dallas, Texas. The Birch Award is presented each year at the Black Tie Dinner to someone who has made a significant impact nationally on the fight for LGBTQ equality, and is named in honor of former Human Rights Campaign Executive Director Elizabeth Birch.

On Monday, February 15, 2010; Heritage of Pride, the producers of the annual LGBT Pride March down 5th Avenue in New York City announced that Judy Shepard has been selected as a grand marshal for the March along with Lt. Dan Choi previously announced.

On May 3, 2024, she was awarded the Presidential Medal of Freedom by President Joe Biden.

== Bibliography ==
- Shepard, Judy (2009), The Meaning of Matthew: My Son's Murder in Laramie, and a World Transformed, Hudson Street Press. ISBN 1-59463-057-7

== See also ==
- List of civil rights leaders
