= I Want to Come Over =

1996 single by Melissa Etheridge

Single by Melissa Etheridge

from the album Your Little Secret
- B-side: "I'm the Only One"
- Released: January 1996
- Length: 5:25
- Label: Island
- Songwriter: Melissa Etheridge
- Producers: Melissa Etheridge; Hugh Padgham

Melissa Etheridge singles chronology
"Your Little Secret" (1995)	"I Want to Come Over" (1996)	"Nowhere to Go" (1996)

"I Want to Come Over" is a song by American singer-songwriter Melissa Etheridge, released in late January 1996 by Island Records as the second single from her fifth studio album, Your Little Secret (1995). The song was a commercial success, reaching numbers 16 and 22 on the US Cash Box Top 100 and Billboard Hot 100 charts, and number 29 in both Australia and New Zealand. It also reached number one on the Canadian RPM 100 Hit Tracks chart in March 1996. At the end of the year, the song appeared on the American and Canadian year-end charts at numbers 79 and 11, respectively. The accompanying music video was directed by Pam Thomas and features Gwyneth Paltrow.

== Reaction ==
=== Critical reception ===
Larry Flick from Billboard magazine felt the song "should ignite across-the-board radio interest, much in the same way as the mega 'Come to My Window' did." He added, "Tortured romance is what Etheridge does best, and she offers up a heaping dose of sexually charged tension and yearning—topped with just enough philosophical focus to drive the song to its necessary climax. Rockers will dig the now-familiar blend of Etheridge's growl and the clang of guitars, while popsters will find the hook too tasty for words."

=== Accolades ===
Year	Award	Category	Result	Ref.
1997	ASCAP Pop Music Award	Most Performed Songs	Won	

== Music video ==
The music video for "I Want to Come Over", directed by Canadian director Pam Thomas, was shot on-location at an old hotel in Los Angeles, California. Actress Gwyneth Paltrow stars in the video. In the clip, Paltrow drives to her lover's apartment, sits outside in her car and breaks down, before collecting herself and going inside the apartment building. The video is interspersed with scenes of Etheridge performing in the hotel's lobby.

The hotel had one resident still living in the building at the time of the shoot. To keep him out of the areas of the building where they were filming, the director and crew gave the man a bottle of Chivas Regal whiskey.

== Track listings ==
- US CD and cassette single
1. "I Want to Come Over"
2. "Your Little Secret"
- US 7-inch single

A. "I Want to Come Over"
B. "I'm the Only One"

- European CD single
1. "I Want to Come Over"
2. "Your Little Secret"
3. "Let Me Go" (live)
4. "Must Be Crazy for Me" (live)

== Charts ==
=== Weekly charts ===
Chart (1996)	Peak position
Australia (ARIA)	29
Canada Top Singles (RPM)	1
Europe (European Hit Radio)	32
Germany (GfK)	83
Iceland (Íslenski Listinn Topp 40)	35
Netherlands (Dutch Top 40 Tipparade)	12
Netherlands (Single Top 100 Tipparade)	5
New Zealand (Recorded Music NZ)	29
Quebec (ADISQ)	5
UK Singles (Official Charts)	100
US Billboard Hot 100	22
US Adult Alternative Airplay (Billboard)	5
US Adult Contemporary (Billboard)	17
US Adult Pop Airplay (Billboard)	9
US Mainstream Rock Airplay (Billboard)	22
US Pop Airplay (Billboard)	15
US Cash Box Top 100	16

=== Year-end charts ===
Chart (1996)	Position
Canada Top Singles (RPM)	11
US Billboard Hot 100	79
US Adult Top 40 (Billboard)	31
US Top 40/Mainstream (Billboard)	51
