= No Souvenirs =

1989 single by Melissa Etheridge

Single by Melissa Etheridge

from the album Brave and Crazy
- B-side: "No Souvenirs" (live); "Brave & Crazy" (live)
- Released: August 14, 1989
- Recorded: A&M (Hollywood, California)
- Genre: Rock
- Length: 4:33
- Label: Island
- Songwriter: Melissa Etheridge
- Producers: Kevin McCormick; Niko Bolas; Melissa Etheridge

Melissa Etheridge singles chronology
"Chrome Plated Heart" (1989)	"No Souvenirs" (1989)	"The Angels" (1989)

"No Souvenirs" is a song by American singer-songwriter Melissa Etheridge, release as the second single from her second album, Brave and Crazy, in August 1989. Despite peaking at number 95 on the US Billboard Hot 100, the song experienced more success internationally, reaching number 30 in Australia and number four in Canada, where it became Etheridge's highest-charting single until "I Want to Come Over" reached number one in 1996.

== Song information ==
"No Souvenirs" was actually written before the first album came out but Melissa Etheridge decided to keep it back until the second album since its original intro was too similar to the intro of "Bring Me Some Water". The song is about a love affair that goes by very fast and leaves "no souvenirs". The lyrics reflect a phone call the singer makes a while after the breakup reminding her lover that she can still get in touch with her but that she would also accept it if she destroys all the souvenirs of that relationship. On the bonus DVD of her greatest hits album, Etheridge states that this is the song she gets the most questions about since it names various words she has created and phrases that mean specific things to her ("Jackpot telephone", "Make the buffalo roam"...).

== Music video ==
The music video was shot in 1989 and shows the singer sitting at the dock of a bay playing the guitar with her band in the background. The video plays at night in a big city, most likely New York regarding the skyline in the background. The scene is interrupted by various short films showing her lover destroying the souvenirs of the very short love affair. To illustrate the anonymous character of that relationship, the head of the person is not visible.

== Track listings ==
All songs were written by Melissa Etheridge.

7-inch, cassette, and mini-CD single

1. "No Souvenirs" – 4:33
2. "No Souvenirs" (live) – 4:43

US maxi-CD single

1. "No Souvenirs" – 4:33
2. "No Souvenirs" (live) – 4:43
3. "Like the Way I Do" (live) – 10:46

UK 12-inch and CD single

A1. "No Souvenirs" – 4:33
B1. "Brave and Crazy" (live) – 4:47
B2. "No Souvenirs" (live) – 4:43

== Personnel ==
- vocals and 12 string guitar by Melissa Etheridge
- Bass, recording and mix by Kevin McCormick
- drums and cymbals by Mauricio Fritz Lewak
- Electric guitar by Bernie Larsen
- keyboards by Scott Thurston
- Acoustic guitar by Waddy Wachtel
- Harmonica by Bono
- Arrangement by Kevin McCormick and Melissa Etheridge
- Engineering by Bob Vogt

== Charts ==
=== Weekly charts ===
Chart (1989)	Peak position
Australia (ARIA)	30
Canada Top Singles (RPM)	4
Canada Adult Contemporary (RPM)	1
Netherlands (Single Top 100)	71
Quebec (ADISQ)	8
US Billboard Hot 100	95
US Alternative Airplay (Billboard)	18
US Mainstream Rock (Billboard)	9

=== Year-end charts ===
Chart (1989)	Position
Canada Top Singles (RPM)	59

== Release history ==
Region	Date	Format(s)	Label(s)	Ref.
United Kingdom	August 14, 1989	7-inch vinyl; 12-inch vinyl; CD	Island	
Japan	September 25, 1989	Mini-CD	Polystar	
