= The Difference (The Wallflowers song) =

1997 single by The Wallflowers

Single by the Wallflowers

from the album Bringing Down the Horse
- B-side: "I Wish I Felt Nothing"; "God Don't Make Lonely Girls" (live)
- Released: 1997
- Length: 3:49
- Label: Interscope
- Songwriter: Jakob Dylan
- Producer: T-Bone Burnett

The Wallflowers singles chronology
"One Headlight" (1997)	"The Difference" (1997)	"Three Marlenas" (1997)

Music video
- "The Difference" on YouTube

"The Difference" is a song by American rock band the Wallflowers. It was released in 1997 as the third single from their second album, Bringing Down the Horse (1996). The song spent eight weeks at number three on the US Billboard Mainstream Rock Tracks chart and peaked at number five on the Modern Rock Tracks chart. It was nominated for a Grammy Award for Best Rock Song in 1998. "The Difference" also peaked at number 12 in Canada, topping the RPM Alternative 30 chart.

== Track listings ==
Australian CD single

1. "The Difference" (LP version)
2. "I Wish I Felt Nothing"
3. "God Don't Make Lonely Girls" (live from KFOG)

Japanese CD single

1. "The Difference"
2. "6th Avenue Heartache"

== Charts ==
=== Weekly charts ===
Chart (1997)	Peak position
Australia (ARIA)	161
Canada Top Singles (RPM)	12
Canada Adult Contemporary (RPM)	34
Canada Rock/Alternative (RPM)	1
US Radio Songs (Billboard)	23
US Adult Alternative Airplay (Billboard)	2
US Adult Pop Airplay (Billboard)	14
US Alternative Airplay (Billboard)	5
US Mainstream Rock (Billboard)	3
US Pop Airplay (Billboard)	19

=== Year-end charts ===
Chart (1997)	Position
Canada Top Singles (RPM)	55
Canada Rock/Alternative (RPM)	25
US Hot 100 Airplay (Billboard)	69
US Adult Top 40 (Billboard)	33
US Mainstream Rock Tracks (Billboard)	14
US Modern Rock Tracks (Billboard)	23
US Top 40/Mainstream (Billboard)	70
US Triple-A (Billboard)	8

== Release history ==
Region	Date	Format(s)	Label(s)	Ref.
United States	1997	Radio	Interscope	
Japan	December 3, 1997	CD	Interscope	
