= If I Wanted To =

1995 single by Melissa Etheridge

Single by Melissa Etheridge

from the album Yes I Am
- Released: January 1995
- Studio: A&M (Hollywood)
- Length: 3:55 (album version); 3:35 (edit)
- Label: Island
- Songwriter: Melissa Etheridge
- Producers: Melissa Etheridge; Hugh Padgham

Melissa Etheridge singles chronology
"All American Girl" (1994)	"If I Wanted To" (1995)	"Your Little Secret" (1995)

"If I Wanted To" is a song by American singer-songwriter Melissa Etheridge, released in January 1995 by Island Records, as the final single from her fourth studio album, Yes I Am (1993). The song is written by Etheridge and produced by her with Hugh Padgham. It entered the top 50 in Australia, Canada, Iceland, and the United States, where it peaked at numbers 9 and 16 on the US Cash Box Top 100 and Billboard Hot 100 charts.

== Commercial performance ==
"If I Wanted To", which was released as a double A-side with "Like the Way I Do" in the United States, debuted on the US Billboard Hot 100 in February 1995 at No. 25, making it the highest-debuting single of 1995 at that point. The single's debut was the highest for any song since Boyz II Men's "On Bended Knee" debuted at No. 14 in November 1994.

"If I Wanted To" peaked at No. 16 on the Billboard Hot 100 in March 1995. Strong singles sales in March 1995 for TLC's "Red Light Special", Real McCoy's "Run Away", and The Notorious B.I.G.'s "Big Poppa" prevented "If I Wanted To" from rising higher on the Hot 100 despite widespread airplay on major US radio stations.

== Reaction ==
=== Critical reception ===
Fred Bronson of Billboard magazine wrote that with the single's debut, "Melissa Etheridge continues to solidify her new status as a chart superstar with the highest-debuting single of 1995." Fell and Rufer from the Gavin Report felt that the song "rocks with the best of her previous winners, but can also stand alone on its own merit, as it builds in intensity without losing its cool." Sam Wood from Philadelphia Inquirer found that with "If I Wanted To" "she describes her own desires with a full palette of harrowing visions that never meander into prettified abstraction".

=== Accolades ===
Year	Award	Category	Result	Ref.
1996	ASCAP Pop Music Award	Most Performed Songs	Won	

== Music video ==
The single's accompanying music video was directed by American director Samuel Bayer. The video was also featured briefly in Twister (1996 film).

== Track listings ==
- US and Australian maxi-CD single
1. "If I Wanted To" – 3:29
2. "Come to My Window" (live) – 3:21
3. "Bring Me Some Water" (live) – 4:35
4. "Like the Way I Do" (live) – 10:12
- US 7-inch single

A. "If I Wanted To" – 3:29
B. "Come to My Window" – 3:34

- US cassette single
1. "If I Wanted To" – 3:29
2. "Like the Way I Do" – 5:23

== Charts ==
=== Weekly charts ===
Chart (1995)	Peak position
Australia (ARIA)	47
Canada Top Singles (RPM)	13
Canada Adult Contemporary (RPM)	17
Iceland (Íslenski Listinn Topp 40)	34
Quebec (ADISQ)	34
US Billboard Hot 100 with "Like the Way I Do"	16
US Adult Contemporary (Billboard)	17
US Pop Airplay (Billboard)	10
US Cash Box Top 100	9

=== Year-end charts ===
Chart (1995)	Position
Canada Top Singles (RPM)	91

== Release history ==
Region	Date	Format(s)	Label(s)	Ref(s).
United States	January 1995	Radio	Island	
Australia	May 8, 1995	CD; cassette	Island	
