= Mirror Ball (Neil Young album) =

Studio album by Neil Young
- Released: June 27, 1995
- Recorded: January – February 10, 1995
- Studios: Bad Animals, Seattle, Washington
- Genre: Grunge
- Length: 55:14
- Labels: Reprise; Epic
- Producer: Brendan O'Brien

Neil Young chronology
Sleeps with Angels (1994)	Mirror Ball (1995)	Dead Man (1996)

Singles from Mirror Ball
- 1. "Downtown" / "Big Green Country" Released: 1995; 2. "Peace and Love" Released: 1995

Mirror Ball is the twenty-third studio album by Canadian-American musician Neil Young, and features members of American rock band Pearl Jam. It was released on June 27, 1995, through Reprise Records. The album has been certified gold by the RIAA in the United States.

In the same year, Pearl Jam released an accompanying EP titled Merkin Ball.

The album was remastered and reissued in 2026 by Warner Records.

== Background ==
As grunge peaked in popularity in the early 1990s, some of the bands expressed admiration for Young's career and influence. At least one music writer noted a similarity in ethos and style between the emerging genre and Young's work, dubbing him the "Godfather of Grunge". Of the younger groups, Young had a particularly close relationship with Pearl Jam. He explains, "We're sympathetic. They're definitely old souls—they've been around. Musically there's youthful energy, but without the sound of inexperience. And our musical styles are compatible; it's like a big wall of sound with a lot of nuances in there." Pearl Jam incorporated "Rockin' in the Free World" into their setlists throughout their 1992 tour. In October, both artists performed, separately, at Bob Dylan's The 30th Anniversary Concert Celebration, and Young invited the band to play an acoustic set two weeks later at that year's Bridge School Benefit concert. Pearl Jam appeared as an opening act on Young's 1993 tour of North America with Booker T. & the M.G.'s. In September, Young joined the group to perform "Rockin' in the Free World" at the 1993 MTV Video Music Awards.

In January 1995, Young asked Eddie Vedder to induct him into the Rock and Roll Hall of Fame. Later that week, Young agreed to appear alongside Pearl Jam at a benefit supporting Voters for Choice, where he performed new songs "Song X" and "Act of Love" with his longtime collaborators Crazy Horse. At the benefit, Pearl Jam joined Young on stage for an encore performance of "Act of Love", which the band had learned by recording Young's set at the Hall of Fame ceremony. Young was inspired by the performance and became eager to record the song with the band in a studio. "I said, 'Maybe we ought to record it. It sounds good.' They were thinking the same thing. So we set a date to go in and record. I wanted to have more than one song, so I came in with three songs in hand." Young elaborates to Dave Marsh in a contemporary radio interview:

"We played this Choice benefit, Pro-Choice benefit in Washington. I played with Crazy Horse and then I came out and played with them. You know, we just like playing together. It sounds good when we play together. We like each other. We played "Act Of Love" at that. It was first time we'd ever played it together. They told me they learned from a DAT because they heard it the night before. It was really in a great groove, so we were thinking this was really good, we really smoked it, we should catch this and get it on tape. So we were talking a little bit about that and we decided to make a plan. Try to figure out when we could do it. We did it about a week or so later. Got two days in the studio."

== Recording ==
The album's recording sessions took place in January 1995 and February 1995 at Ann and Nancy Wilson's Bad Animals Studio in Seattle. The album was produced by Brendan O'Brien, who had previously worked on Pearl Jam's 1993 album, Vs., and 1994 album, Vitalogy.

Young joined Pearl Jam in the studio in January 1995, eleven days after performing with the band at an abortion-rights benefit in Washington, D.C. The album was recorded in four days' studio time (January 26, January 27, February 7, and February 10). Young recorded the songs live in the studio, songs he had written the day before each session. "The beauty of the thing is that hardly any talking had to happen at all. I'd bring the song in and run it down, then everybody would play it. I don't think we did more than five takes on anything. We all knew what we had to do. Everybody was together."

Young brought "Song X", "Act of Love", and five other songs into the studio to record for the first session in January, including "Downtown", "Big Green Country" and "Peace and Love". For the second session in February, he brought in two more songs. Young also wrote two new songs during the February recording sessions, and one song from the January sessions was re-recorded. On February 7, the group captured "I'm the Ocean" and "Truth Be Known" and Young recorded "What Happened Yesterday" solo on pump organ. "Throw Your Hatred Down" and "Scenery" would be recorded February 10. Young recorded "Fallen Angel" at one final solo session on February 26, again on pump organ. Young said that all of the songs, with the exception of "Song X" and "Act of Love", were written during the album's sessions.

Young said he traveled to Seattle to make the record for a "challenge." He said, "Recording Mirror Ball was like audio vérité, just a snapshot of what's happening. Sometimes I didn't know who was playing. I was just conscious of this big smouldering mass of sound." Playing in a group with two other lead guitarists reminded him of his days in Buffalo Springfield. Mike McCready told Guitar World, "We'd be jamming, and I'd look over and say to myself, 'That's Neil Young, and he's playing leads. That's the shit!' I could only wish to be that good. I was completely honored to be playing with him. We're enamored of him...and I'm honored he says he's into us. I think he just likes where we're coming from. He sees a lot of honesty in our music." Young called Pearl Jam drummer Jack Irons "unbelievable." He said that Irons "played his ass off on every take at every session," and added, "I can't say enough good things about him."

Pearl Jam vocalist Eddie Vedder was not around much for the recording sessions. Vedder explained that he was "in the midst of a pretty intense stalker problem," adding that "leaving the house wasn't the easiest thing to do." Vedder referred to the issue in the song "Lukin" from Pearl Jam's 1996 album No Code. Pearl Jam guitarist Stone Gossard said that Mirror Ball "came at a time when we needed it, that Neil thought we were a band that would be good to make a record with. He probably felt sorry for us. He made it all right for us to be who we were. He's not taking his career so seriously that he can't take chances. Suddenly, our band seemed too serious."

== Writing ==
Mirror Ball captures a loose rock sound. The album has a very raw sound to it, with songs ending in feedback and band members talking at the start and at the end of many songs, including Young remarking at the end of "Downtown": "Well, we know that one. That's funky." Young wrote all of the tracks for the album except for "Peace and Love", which was co-written by Young and Vedder. William Ruhlmann of AllMusic said that, "Pearl Jam boasts spirited rhythms and dense guitar interplay that Young makes excellent use of in a series of songs built out of simple, melodic riffs."

On the lyrical content of Mirror Ball, Young said, "There's idealism and reality, the two have got to come together yet there are always major problems when they do. Maybe that's the crux of what I'm trying to say in this new album. It's also a commentary of the differences between my peace and love '60s generation and the more cynical '90s generation." "Song X" and "Act of Love" were written about abortion. "This isn't an easy subject to confront head-on. People who say that human beings shouldn't have the right to dismiss a human life - they have a point. You can't dismiss that point."

"I'm the Ocean" acknowledges the difficulty of living in the moment and how easy it is for life to become a series of quick flashes of different experiences. Young explains in a 2018 post to his Archives website: "Too many times in this life, we miss what is going on right in front of us......I try but sometimes i don't see. Lots of love to the searchers..." He elaborates in a contemporary radio interview: "It's kind of like a bunch of flashes of things going on all at the same time or something. So you get kind of the feeling that your life is flashing before you. So that makes you think you're floating up on the ceiling somewhere watching. I just got caught up in this thing where everything just kept happening and all I could do was write it down."

"Downtown" includes references to Jimi Hendrix and Led Zeppelin. The reference to Led Zeppelin was partly inspired by Young's performance with the band at the 1995 Rock and Roll Hall of Fame induction ceremony, where they played "When the Levee Breaks" together.

"Peace and Love" features vocals by both Young and Vedder, who also share writing credits. Young told Kurt Loder for MTV News: "Ultimately what happened was that I never finished it. Eddie finished it. Because I had this melody in this place. It was a great way to save it."

"Throw Your Hatred Down" explores the nature of conflict and shares a message of non-violence. "I was thinking about the kids in the schoolyard who are fighting - like just the different ways to go and they're started right there. Just how...where does it start...where do we start the conflict? You know, where does it begin? It must begin at birth or something, because conflict is always there. It seems part of our nature, as sad as it sounds. I mean it must just be there...and I just, you know...was drifting around in my head trying...I just had all these images of this...conflict and people planning ways to overcome evil and evil planning ways to encroach on good."

The album closes with the extended "Scenery" featuring the group with Brendan O'Brien on piano and "Fallen Angel" which reprises the melody of "I'm the Ocean" with Young alone on pump organ.

== Packaging ==
A mirror ball graces the album's cover. Because of legal complications between their respective record companies, only Young's name appears on the album sleeve, although the members of Pearl Jam are credited individually in the album's liner notes. Pearl Jam's Merkin Ball complements the layout and content of the album packaging for Mirror Ball.

== Tour ==
Following the completion of Mirror Ball, the members of Pearl Jam (minus Vedder) and producer O'Brien (on keyboards) joined Young in August 1995 for an eleven-date tour in Europe to promote the album. When the band toured, fans referred to them as "Neil Jam". Pearl Jam guitarist Mike McCready said, "It was a dream come true. We got to play a bunch of Neil Young songs with Neil Young himself and got to go to Berlin, to Jerusalem, to the Red Sea." This tour proved very successful with Young's manager Elliot Roberts calling it "one of the greatest tours we ever had in our whole lives." The performance in Dublin was professionally filmed and recorded for potential commercial release.

== Reception ==
Professional ratings
Review scores
Source	Rating
AllMusic	3/5 stars
Blender	2/5 stars
Robert Christgau	(1-star Honorable Mention)
Entertainment Weekly	A−
NME	9/10
Rolling Stone	4/5 stars
Spin	8/10 stars
Time	favorable

Mirror Ball reached number five on the Billboard 200 album chart. Mirror Ball has been certified gold by the RIAA.

NME gave Mirror Ball a nine out of ten. In the review, Mirror Ball is called "another fine Neil Young album....the record's sound is...big, woolly, live and booming." Rolling Stone staff writer J.D. Considine gave Mirror Ball four out of five stars, saying, "Though Young is clearly the dominant partner—it's his concept, after all, his songs and his album—it's Pearl Jam who ultimately end up determining the music's shape and feel, providing a level of input and energy that goes well beyond the normal purview of a backing band." Spin gave the album eight out of ten stars. The review said, "Sometimes it's easier to string together some power chords and a few forlorn references to religion, fame and suicide than to actually write songs. And sometimes that's just fine." David Browne of Entertainment Weekly gave the album an A−. Browne said that "the album has a spontaneous, bang-it-out casualness that is, to say the least, extremely rare for a rock veteran." However, Browne criticized the album's lyrics, calling them "mostly jumbled rehashes of standard Young imagery." Time reviewer Christopher John Farley said that "Pearl Jam serves as an extraordinary backup band on the new album." Farley added that the album is "one of the most consistently rewarding works of Young's long rewarding career."

AllMusic staff writer William Ruhlmann gave the album three out of five stars, saying that "Mirror Ball is typically uneven." Critic Robert Christgau said that Young "was born to lumber, and Pearl Jam wasn't." Blender gave the album two out of five stars. The review said that "it could have been better. The fault is less with Pearl Jam, who thrash so awkwardly they make Crazy Horse sound like Steely Dan, than with Young's unmemorable songs."

"Downtown" and "Peace and Love" had accompanying music videos. "Downtown" was the most successful song from Mirror Ball on the rock charts, reaching number six on the Mainstream Rock charts. "Peace and Love" also charted on the Mainstream Rock charts. At the 1996 Grammy Awards, "Downtown" received a nomination for Best Rock Song and "Peace and Love" received a nomination for Best Male Rock Vocal Performance. Mirror Ball received a nomination for Best Rock Album. Album cover artist Gary Burden was nominated for a Grammy Award for Best Recording Package.

== Track listing ==
All tracks are written by Neil Young, except "Peace and Love" by Young and Eddie Vedder.

No.	Title	Length
1.	"Song X"	4:40
2.	"Act of Love"	4:54
3.	"I'm the Ocean"	7:05
4.	"Big Green Country"	5:08
5.	"Truth Be Known"	4:39
6.	"Downtown"	5:10
7.	"What Happened Yesterday"	0:46
8.	"Peace and Love"	7:02
9.	"Throw Your Hatred Down"	5:45
10.	"Scenery"	8:50
11.	"Fallen Angel"	1:15

== Outtakes ==
The songs "I Got Id" and "Long Road", both written and sung by Vedder, were cut from the album. Both songs were recorded at the tail end of the Mirror Ball sessions. The tracks were later released on Pearl Jam's 1995 Merkin Ball EP.

== Personnel ==
- Neil Young – vocals, electric guitar, acoustic guitar, pump organ

Pearl Jam

- Jeff Ament – bass guitar
- Stone Gossard – electric guitar
- Jack Irons – drums
- Mike McCready – electric guitar
- Eddie Vedder – vocals on "Peace and Love", background vocals

Production

- Brendan O'Brien – production, mixing, electric guitar, piano, background vocals
- John Aguto, Sam Hofstedt, Chad Munsey – assistant engineering
- Nicky Alexander, Girsh – drum technicians
- Joel Bernstein – production assistance, typography, and mosaic portrait of Neil Young
- Gary Burden – art direction and design
- Rhonda Burns – CD label computer graphics
- Nick DiDia – additional engineering
- Henry Diltz – back cover and inside photo
- Brett Eliason – engineering
- Emek – logo lettering
- Joe Gastwirt – Analog to HDCD transfers, digital editing, digital mastering
- John Hausman – production assistance
- KPOB – art direction and design assistance
- Tim Mulligan – digital editing, digital mastering
- John Nowland – Analog to HDCD transfers
- Jeff Ousley, Tim "Scully" Quinlan – guitar technicians
- "Pflash" Pflaumer – assistance
- Sal Trentino – amplifier technician
- Ian Geiger – guitar technician
- George Webb – bass technician
- Keith Wissmar – ambience

== Chart positions ==
=== Album ===
Chart (1995)	Peak Position
Norwegian Albums Chart	2
Swedish Albums Chart	3
Australian Albums Chart	4
UK Albums Chart	4
US Billboard 200	5
Canadian Albums Chart	4
German Albums Chart	8
New Zealand Albums Chart	10
Finnish Albums (Suomen virallinen lista)	11
Austrian Albums Chart	15
Dutch Albums Chart	18
Swiss Albums Chart	24

Chart (2026)	Peak Position
Croatian International Albums (HDU)	1
Hungarian Physical Albums (MAHASZ)	15

=== Year-end charts ===
Chart (1995)	Position
German Albums Chart	48

=== Singles ===
Year	Single	Peak chart positions	
Year	Single	US Main	CAN
1995	"Downtown"	6	13
1995	"Peace and Love"	34	—
"—" denotes songs that did not chart.

== Certifications and sales ==
Region	Certification	Certified units/sales
Germany	—	150,000
United Kingdom (BPI)	Silver	60,000^{^}
United States (RIAA)	Gold	500,000^{^}
^{^} Shipments figures based on certification alone.
