= Three Marlenas =

1997 single by the Wallflowers

Single by the Wallflowers

from the album Bringing Down the Horse
- B-side: "Three Marlenas" (live); "One Headlight" (live)
- Released: October 7, 1997
- Length: 4:59
- Label: Interscope
- Songwriter: Jakob Dylan
- Producer: T-Bone Burnett

The Wallflowers singles chronology
"The Difference" (1997)	"Three Marlenas" (1997)	"Heroes" (1998)

Music video
- "Three Marlenas" on YouTube

"Three Marlenas" is a song by American rock band the Wallflowers. It was released in October 1997 as the fourth and final single from their second album, Bringing Down the Horse (1996). The song peaked at number 51 on the US Billboard Hot 100 Airplay chart and number 13 on Canada's RPM 100 Hit Tracks chart.

== Music video ==
A music video, directed by Big TV!, was produced for the song. Lead singer Jakob Dylan emerges out of an ocean undeterred and walks around a frozen city for the duration of the song.

== Track listing ==
UK CD single

1. "Three Marlenas" (edit) – 4:29
2. "Three Marlenas" (live on KFOG)
3. "One Headlight" (live on KFOG)

== Charts ==
=== Weekly charts ===
Chart (1997–1998)	Peak position
Canada Top Singles (RPM)	13
Canada Rock/Alternative (RPM)	5
UK Singles (Official Charts)	93
US Radio Songs (Billboard)	51
US Adult Alternative Airplay (Billboard)	2
US Adult Pop Airplay (Billboard)	27
US Alternative Airplay (Billboard)	17
US Mainstream Rock (Billboard)	21
US Pop Airplay (Billboard)	35

=== Year-end charts ===
Chart (1997)	Position
US Mainstream Rock Tracks (Billboard)	100
US Triple-A (Billboard)	35

Chart (1998)	Position
US Adult Top 40 (Billboard)	96
US Triple-A (Billboard)	46

== Release history ==
Region	Date	Format(s)	Label(s)	Ref.
United States	October 7, 1997	Contemporary hit radio	Interscope	
United Kingdom	March 23, 1998	CD; cassette	Interscope	
