= Your Little Secret =

1995 album by Melissa Etheridge

Studio album by Melissa Etheridge
- Released: November 14, 1995
- Studio: A&M (Los Angeles)
- Genre: Blues rock
- Length: 52:54
- Label: Island
- Producer: Melissa Etheridge, Hugh Padgham

Melissa Etheridge chronology
| Yes I Am (1993) | Your Little Secret (1995) | Breakdown (1999) |

Singles from Your Little Secret
- 1. "Your Little Secret" Released: October 2, 1995; 2. "I Want to Come Over" Released: January 1996; 3. "Nowhere to Go" Released: 1996

Professional ratings
Review scores
| Source | Rating |
|---|---|
| AllMusic | 2/5 stars |
| Cash Box | (favorable) |
| Robert Christgau | (dud) |
| Entertainment Weekly | C |
| Los Angeles Times | 2.5/4 stars |
| Q | 4/5 stars |
| Rolling Stone | 2/5 stars |

Your Little Secret is the fifth studio album by American singer-songwriter Melissa Etheridge, released by Island Records on November 14, 1995. It is her highest-charting album on the Billboard 200, where it peaked at No. 6. The album also contained three singles, "Your Little Secret", "I Want to Come Over", and "Nowhere to Go". "I Want to Come Over" went on to reach No. 22 on the Billboard Hot 100, and "Nowhere to Go" peaked at No. 40.

As of 2010, the album has sold 1,348,000 copies in the United States alone, according to Nielsen SoundScan.

== Reception ==
Billboard praised the record, calling it a "superbly well-crafted album. Armed with her sharpest material to date, the tightest band with which she's ever recorded, and an in-your-face sound, Etheridge rocks even more passionately than on her previous smash, Yes I Am...Under pressure to follow up a multiplatinum, milestone album, Etheridge has delivered the goods and then some. A new plateau for an artist who has set the pace for female rockers of her generation."

In their review, Cashbox noted that "on this, her fifth album, Etheridge continues to demonstrate the consistency that has made her a superstar. The disc kicks in with the grinding rocker/title track, then settles into a groove of anthem-like rockers, such as “I Really Like You,” “This War Is Over” and the record’s best track, the engaging “An Unusual Kiss.” Her ballad skills are underrated, but as “Nowhere To Go” and the opening half of “Shriner’s Park” prove, she is just as talented in that medium. The bottom line is Etheridge is a great singer with good songs, making every album a project worth embracing."

Allmusic were more mixed in their review, stating that "Etheridge's challenge would be to grow as a writer, now that incessant touring and a string of good-but-not-great albums finally had brought her to the platinum threshold. Your Little Secret left the question about such growth open."

== Track listing ==
All songs by Melissa Etheridge, except where noted

1. "Your Little Secret" – 4:19
2. "I Really Like You" – 4:09
3. "Nowhere to Go" – 5:53
4. "An Unusual Kiss" – 5:21
5. "I Want to Come Over" – 5:25
6. "All the Way to Heaven" – 4:54
7. "I Could Have Been You" (Etheridge, John Shanks) – 5:56
8. "Shriner's Park" – 5:23
9. "Change" – 4:37
10. "This War Is Over" – 6:57

Limited edition 2CD set includes 4 track live CD

1. "Come to My Window" – 4:01
2. "No Souvenirs" – 5:00
3. "Ain't It Heavy" – 4:20
4. "Yes I Am" – 4:23

== Personnel ==
- Melissa Etheridge – acoustic guitar, electric guitar, keyboards, vocals
- John Shanks – acoustic guitar, electric guitar, keyboards
- Mark Browne – bass guitar
- Kenny Aronoff, Dave Beyer – drums, percussion

== Production ==
- Producers: Melissa Etheridge, Hugh Padgham
- Engineers: Greg Goldman, Hugh Padgham
- Assistant engineer: John Aguto
- Mastering: Bob Ludwig
- Post production: Cheryl Engels
- Art direction: Judy Troilo

== Charts ==
=== Weekly charts ===
| Chart (1995) | Peak position |
|---|---|
| Australian Albums (ARIA) | 17 |
| Austrian Albums (Ö3 Austria) | 30 |
| Belgian Albums (Ultratop Flanders) | 33 |
| Dutch Albums (Album Top 100) | 10 |
| German Albums (Offizielle Top 100) | 26 |
| New Zealand Albums (RMNZ) | 22 |
| Norwegian Albums (VG-lista) | 40 |
| Swiss Albums (Schweizer Hitparade) | 23 |
| UK Albums (OCC) | 85 |
| US Billboard 200 | 6 |
| Canadian Album Chart | 10 |
| European Albums (Eurotipsheet) | 46 |

=== Year-end charts ===
| Chart (1996) | Position |
|---|---|
| US Billboard 200 | 51 |

Singles – Billboard (North America)

| Year | Single | Chart | Position |
|---|---|---|---|
| 1995 | "I Want to Come Over" | Adult Top 40 | 9 |
| 1995 | "Your Little Secret" | Adult Top 40 | 40 |
| 1995 | "Your Little Secret" | Mainstream Rock Tracks | 4 |
| 1995 | "Your Little Secret" | Modern Rock Tracks | 32 |
| 1995 | "Your Little Secret" | Top 40 Mainstream | 29 |
| 1996 | "I Want to Come Over" | Adult Contemporary | 17 |
| 1996 | "I Want to Come Over" | Mainstream Rock Tracks | 22 |
| 1996 | "I Want to Come Over" | The Billboard Hot 100 | 22 |
| 1996 | "I Want to Come Over" | Top 40 Adult Recurrents | 1 |
| 1996 | "I Want to Come Over" | Top 40 Mainstream | 15 |
| 1996 | "Nowhere to Go" | Adult Contemporary | 24 |
| 1996 | "Nowhere to Go" | Adult Top 40 | 9 |
| 1996 | "Nowhere to Go" | The Billboard Hot 100 | 40 |
| 1996 | "Nowhere to Go" | Top 40 Mainstream | 25 |
| 1997 | "Nowhere to Go" | Top 40 Adult Recurrents | 9 |

== Certifications ==
| Region | Certification | Certified units/sales |
|---|---|---|
| Australia (ARIA) | Gold | 35,000^{^} |
| Canada (Music Canada) | Platinum | 100,000^{^} |
| United States (RIAA) | 2× Platinum | 2,000,000^{^} |
^{^} Shipments figures based on certification alone.
