= I'm the Only One =

1993 single by Melissa Etheridge

Single by Melissa Etheridge

from the album Yes I Am
- B-side: "I'm the Only One" (live)
- Released: September 7, 1993
- Studio: A&M (Hollywood)
- Length: 4:54
- Label: Island
- Songwriter: Melissa Etheridge
- Producers: Hugh Padgham; Melissa Etheridge

Melissa Etheridge singles chronology
"2001" (1992)	"I'm the Only One" (1993)	"Come to My Window" (1993)

Music video
- "I'm the Only One" on YouTube

"I'm the Only One" is a song by American singer-songwriter Melissa Etheridge from her fourth studio album, Yes I Am (1993). It was released as the album's first single in September 1993 by Island Records, reaching No. 12 in Canada and No. 26 in the Netherlands. In the United States, it was slow to gain momentum, but after the success of "Come to My Window", it was re-released, peaking at No. 8 on the Billboard Hot 100 and No. 1 on the Billboard Adult Contemporary chart in January 1995. It remains Etheridge's biggest hit on either chart and earned her a nomination for the Grammy Award for Best Rock Song in 1995.

== Content ==
Like many songs on her first album, Melissa Etheridge, "I'm the Only One" deals with non-monogamous relationships. In the verses, the singer tells how much she suffers because her partner desires someone else. In the chorus, the singer reminds her partner that even if her partner is in a new relationship, that the singer will always be the only one who really loves them with passion.

== Accolades ==
Year	Award	Category	Result	Ref.
1995	Grammy Award	Best Rock Song	Nominated	
1995	GLAAD Media Award	Outstanding Music Video	Won	
1996	ASCAP Pop Music Award	Most Performed Songs	Won	

== Music video ==
The music video for "I'm the Only One" shows Etheridge performing at a club, with several close-up shots of her face, while couples dance sensually. It was directed by David Hogan, marking their first collaboration on a video, and won the GLAAD Media Award for Outstanding Music Video. Hogan, who became friends with Etheridge, later helmed several other of her videos, including "Your Little Secret" in 1995 and "I Want to Be in Love" in 2001.

== Track listings ==
All songs were written by Melissa Etheridge, except for "Maggie May", written by Rod Stewart and Martin Quittenton.

- US cassette single
1. "I'm the Only One" (album version) – 4:54
2. "Maggie May" (live) – 6:18
- US maxi-CD single
1. "I'm the Only One" (album version) – 4:54
2. "Maggie May" (live) – 6:18
3. "Ain't It Heavy" (live) – 4:13
4. "I'm the Only One" (live) – 5:26
- UK 7-inch single

A. "I'm the Only One" (edit) – 4:15
B. "I'm the Only One" (live) – 5:30

- UK CD single
1. "I'm the Only One" (edit) – 4:15
2. "Bring Me Some Water" – 4:22
3. "I'm the Only One" (live) – 5:30
4. "Yes I Am" (live) – 5:02
- Dutch CD single
1. "I'm the Only One" (edit) – 4:15
2. "I'm the Only One" (live) – 5:30
3. "Yes I Am" (live) – 5:02

== Credits and personnel ==
- Vocals and acoustic guitar by Melissa Etheridge
- Drums and percussion by Mauricio Fritz Lewak
- Electric guitar by Waddy Wachtel
- Keyboards by Scott Thurston
- Bass by Pino Palladino
- Engineering by Hugh Padgham
- Assistant engineering by Greg Goldman, John Aguto, and Mike Baumgartner
- Mixing by Hugh Padgham
- Mastering by Bob Ludwig at Gateway Mastering

== Charts ==
=== Weekly charts ===
Chart (1993–1995)	Peak position
Australia (ARIA)	58
Canada Retail Singles (The Record)	10
Canada Top Singles (RPM) 1993 peak	12
Canada Top Singles (RPM) 1994 peak	35
Iceland (Íslenski Listinn Topp 40)	25
Netherlands (Dutch Top 40)	28
Netherlands (Single Top 100)	26
Quebec (ADISQ)	7
US Billboard Hot 100	8
US Adult Contemporary (Billboard)	1
US Adult Pop Airplay (Billboard)	28
US Mainstream Rock (Billboard)	10
US Pop Airplay (Billboard)	4
US Cash Box Top 100	5

=== Year-end charts ===
Chart (1993)	Position
Canada Top Singles (RPM)	96

Chart (1994)	Position
US Billboard Hot 100	92

Chart (1995)	Position
US Billboard Hot 100	44
US Adult Contemporary (Billboard)	16
US Top 40/Mainstream (Billboard)	38
US Cash Box Top 100	44

== Release history ==
Region	Date	Format(s)	Label(s)	Ref.
United States	September 7, 1993	Album rock; alternative radio	Island	
Australia	October 18, 1993	CD; cassette	Island	
United Kingdom	November 1, 1993	7-inch vinyl; CD; cassette	Island	
