= Downtown (Neil Young song) =

Single by Neil Young

from the album Mirror Ball
- B-side: "Big Green Country"
- Released: 1995
- Recorded: January 26, 1995
- Studio: Bad Animals Studio, Seattle
- Genre: Rock
- Length: 5:11; 4:10 (Radio Edit)
- Label: Reprise
- Songwriter: Neil Young
- Producer: Brendan O'Brien

Neil Young singles chronology
"Change Your Mind" (1994)	"Downtown" (1995)	"Peace and Love" (1995)

Music video
- "Downtown" on YouTube

"Downtown" is a song by Neil Young. It was released in 1995 as the lead single from his twenty-third studio album, Mirror Ball. The song was recorded with the members of rock band Pearl Jam. “Downtown” was nominated for Best Rock Song at the 1996 Grammy Awards.

== Track listing ==
1. "Downtown" (Radio Edit) – 4:10
2. "Downtown" (Album Version) – 5:11
3. "Big Green Country" – 5:06

== Personnel ==
- Neil Young – guitar, vocals
- Mike McCready – guitar
- Stone Gossard – guitar
- Jeff Ament – bass
- Jack Irons – drums

== Charts ==
=== Weekly charts ===
Chart (1995)	Peak position
Canadian RPM Top Singles Chart	13
Canadian RPM Alternative 30	5
U.S. Billboard Mainstream Rock Tracks	6

UK: #91

=== Year-end charts ===
Chart (1995)	Position
Canada Top Singles (RPM)	94
