= Yes I Am (Melissa Etheridge album) =

Album by Melissa Etheridge

Studio album by Melissa Etheridge
- Released: September 21, 1993
- Recorded: A&M (Los Angeles)
- Genre: Blues rock; hard rock
- Length: 43:54
- Label: Island
- Producer: Melissa Etheridge, Hugh Padgham

Melissa Etheridge chronology
Never Enough (1992)	Yes I Am (1993)	Your Little Secret (1995)

Singles from Yes I Am
- 1. "I'm the Only One" Released: September 7, 1993; 2. "Come to My Window" Released: 1993; 3. "All American Girl" Released: 1994; 4. "I Will Never Be the Same" Released: 1994; 5. "If I Wanted To" Released: 1994

Professional ratings
Review scores
Source	Rating
AllMusic	4/5 stars
Calgary Herald	B
Robert Christgau	C+
Entertainment Weekly	B
Philadelphia Inquirer	3/4 stars
The Rolling Stone Album Guide	3.5/5 stars

Yes I Am is the fourth studio album by American singer-songwriter Melissa Etheridge, released by Island Records on September 21, 1993. The pivotal album that gave Etheridge national and international recognition, the rock ballad "Come to My Window" was the first single released from the album, which peaked at No. 25 on the Billboard Hot 100, and its video featured the actress Juliette Lewis having a nervous breakdown. This single was quickly followed by "I'm the Only One", which became a major hit in the US and reached No. 8 on the Hot 100, and "If I Wanted To", which reached No. 16. By 2010, the album had sold over 4,348,000 copies in the United States alone, according to Nielsen SoundScan.

The title is generally thought to refer to Etheridge's recent coming out as a lesbian, confirming long-standing rumors about her personal life. However, in 2018, Etheridge clarified that in fact the title for the track and album were not statements regarding her sexual identity. That same year, she went on tour to celebrate the 25th anniversary of Yes I Am's release and also re-released the album with eight bonus tracks.

== Recording and production ==
The songs on Yes I Am were recorded at A&M Studios in Los Angeles, California. The album was produced by Etheridge and Hugh Padgham, who also engineered the album. Padgham had previously worked mainly with British artists and bands including Genesis, David Bowie and Sting. He also produced Etheridge's next album, Your Little Secret.

The main musicians backing Etheridge were Kevin McCormick (who had co-produced her previous albums), Mauricio Fritz Lewak, Waddy Wachtel and Scott Thurston. Pino Palladino replaced McCormick on several tracks and David Sutton replaced him on one song. Ian McLagen and James Fearnley also made appearances.

== Reaction ==
=== Critical reception ===
In their review, Billboard noted that "working with Etheridge for the first time, veteran producer Padgham has not tampered with the formula that made the rock singer/songwriter's first three works album rock standbys. Here, she scores with bluesy lead single "I'm The Only One" and tracks "If I Only Wanted To," "Come To My Window," and "All- American Girl."

In their review, Allmusic stated that "Melissa Etheridge wasn't out of the closet when she released Yes I Am in 1993, yet it's hard not to notice the defiant acclamation in the album's title. This barely concealed sense of sexual identity seeps out from the lyrics, and it informs the music as well, which is perhaps the most confident she has ever been. It's also the most professional she's ever been."

=== Accolades ===
Year	Award	Category	Work	Result	Ref.
1994	GLAAD Media Award	Outstanding Music Artist	Yes I Am	Won	
1995	GLAAD Media Award	Outstanding Music Video	"I'm the Only One"	Won	
1995	Grammy Award	Best Rock Song	"I'm the Only One"	Nominated	
1995	Grammy Award	Best Rock Song	"Come to My Window"	Nominated	
1995	Grammy Award	Best Female Rock Vocal Performance	"Come to My Window"	Won	
1996	ASCAP Pop Music Award	Herself	Pop Songwriter of the Year	Won	
1996	ASCAP Pop Music Award	Most Performed Songs	"Come to My Window"	Won	
1996	ASCAP Pop Music Award	Most Performed Songs	"I'm the Only One"	Won	
1996	ASCAP Pop Music Award	Most Performed Songs	"If I Wanted To"	Won	

== Track listing ==
All songs written by Melissa Etheridge.

1. "I'm the Only One" – 4:54
2. "If I Wanted To" – 3:55
3. "Come to My Window" – 3:55
4. "Silent Legacy" – 5:22
5. "I Will Never Be the Same" – 4:41
6. "All American Girl" – 4:05
7. "Yes I Am" – 4:24
8. "Resist" – 2:57
9. "Ruins" – 4:53
10. "Talking to My Angel" – 4:48

== Personnel ==
The following people contributed to Yes I Am:

- Melissa Etheridge – vocals, electric guitar, acoustic guitar, producer
- Waddy Wachtel – electric guitar
- Scott Thurston – keyboards
- Kevin McCormick – bass guitar
- Mauricio Fritz Lewak – drums, percussion
- Pino Palladino – bass guitar
- David Sutton – bass guitar on "All American Girl"
- James Fearnley – accordion on "Talking to My Angel"
- Ian McLagan – Hammond organ on "I Will Never Be the Same"

Technical

- Hugh Padgham – producer, mixing engineer
- Greg Goldman – assistant engineer
- John Aguto – assistant engineer
- Mike Baumgartner – assistant engineer
- Bob Ludwig – mastering

== Charts ==
=== Weekly charts ===
Chart (1993–94)	Peak position
Australian Albums (ARIA)	39
Austrian Albums (Ö3 Austria)	22
Canadian Top Albums	18
Dutch Albums (Album Top 100)	2
German Albums (Offizielle Top 100)	31
New Zealand Albums (RMNZ)	20
Swiss Albums (Schweizer Hitparade)	17
US Billboard 200	15
European Albums (Eurotipsheet)	43

=== Year-end charts ===
Chart (1993)	Position
Dutch Albums (Album Top 100)	94
Chart (1994)	Position
US Billboard 200	57

=== Decade-end charts ===
Chart (1990–1999)	Position
U.S. Billboard 200	100

== Certifications ==
Region	Certification	Certified units/sales
Canada (Music Canada)	2× Platinum	200,000^{^}
United States (RIAA)	6× Platinum	6,000,000^{^}
^{^} Shipments figures based on certification alone.
