= Your Little Secret (song) =

1995 single by Melissa Etheridge

Single by Melissa Etheridge

from the album Your Little Secret
- Released: October 2, 1995
- Length: 4:20
- Label: Island
- Songwriter: Melissa Etheridge
- Producer: Hugh Padgham

Melissa Etheridge singles chronology
"If I Wanted To" (1994)	"Your Little Secret" (1995)	"I Want to Come Over" (1996)

Music video
- "Your Little Secret" on YouTube

"Your Little Secret" is the first single and title track from American singer-songwriter Melissa Etheridge's fifth studio album of the same name (1995). The song was produced by Hugh Padgham and released on October 2, 1995, by Island Records. It became a top-10 hit in Canada, peaking at number six on the RPM 100 Hit Tracks chart. In the United States, it reached number four on the Billboard Album Rock Tracks chart. The music video for the song was directed by David Hogan and shot in black-and-white, depicting people climbing on what appears to be a human wall of models.

== Production and release ==
The song was written by Melissa Etheridge. "Your Little Secret" (as well as the album) was produced by British record producer Hugh Padgham, who had also produced Etheridge's breakthrough 1993 album, Yes I Am. After the pop music success of singles from Yes I Am, "Your Little Secret" was marketed as a single for the alternative and modern rock music genres. The single was released commercially in Australia on October 2, 1995, and was serviced to US radio stations on October 9, with an emphasis on alternative and modern rock format stations.

== Critical reception ==
Steve Baltin from Cash Box named the song Pick of the Week in November 1995, noting that "this fiery rocker with the blues base has been immediately embraced at all formats of radio, successfully continuing the singles success she had with her breakthrough album, last year's Yes I Am." He added, "Featuring the singer/songwriter's infamous snarl on the song's seductive chonis, 'Your Little Secret' encapsulates all of the traits that have catapulted Etheridge into the best-bet category among pop/rock acts. And with VH1 all over this track, and two upcoming specials on the channel, expect this album to break out big." Pan-European magazine Music & Media wrote, "Acclaim and sales still grow with each CD, and her songs get covered by other artists too. Chord progression and vibe of this rocker are like the Black Crowes version of 'Hard to Handle'." In a separate review, the song was named "a sturdy and rocky number that sports an infectious chorus, bound to push Etheridge high up the EHR charts."

== Music video ==
The accompanying music video for "Your Little Secret" was directed by David Hogan. The black and white video features Etheridge performing with her band against a white background. Etheridge, as well as the video's dancers, are seen through a keyhole, a recurring theme for the Your Little Secret album. In addition to the music video, the keyhole imagery was also utilized on the CD single cover art, the album cover, and the marketing campaign for the album.

The video depicts a woman, as well as other men and women, scaling and climbing a human wall of attractive male and female models. Etheridge and Hogan had become personal and professional friends. Hogan conceived the concept of a wall after listening to "You Little Secret" on repeat. In a 2015 interview, Hogan explained, "We [he and Etheridge] had met at a party through mutual friends and did our first video. We've remained friends ever since. She just called me about that one and I sat and listened to the song ['Your Little Secret'] over and over, as usual. It just kind of popped into my head. 'Little secrets, I've got a whole wall of little secrets.' So that's kind of where it came from." Two women kiss on screen, while other men and women get intimately close with each other.

According to Steve Reeds, the then Vice President of video and alternative radio, the music video's themes were positively received by MTV and VH1. The music video received a VH1 Fashion Awards nomination in 1996 for "Most Stylish Video."

== Track listings ==
- Canadian and Australian CD single
1. "Your Little Secret" – 4:20
2. "All American Girl" (live) – 4:29
3. "Chrome Plated Heart" (live) – 3:33
4. "Keep It Precious" (live) – 8:56
- European CD single
1. "Your Little Secret" – 4:20
2. "All American Girl" (live) – 4:37
- UK CD single
1. "Your Little Secret" – 4:20
2. "All American Girl" (live) – 4:29
3. "Bring Me Some Water" (live) – 4:18
4. "Skin Deep" (live) – 3:45

== Charts ==
=== Weekly charts ===
Chart (1995–1996)	Peak position
Australia (ARIA)	40
Canada Top Singles (RPM)	6
Canada Adult Contemporary (RPM)	47
Germany (GfK)	99
Netherlands (Dutch Top 40)	36
Netherlands (Single Top 100)	25
Quebec (ADISQ)	8
US Adult Pop Airplay (Billboard)	40
US Alternative Airplay (Billboard)	32
US Mainstream Rock Airplay (Billboard)	4
US Pop Airplay (Billboard)	29

=== Year-end charts ===
Chart (1995)	Position
Canada Top Singles (RPM)	72

Chart (1996)	Position
Canada Top Singles (RPM)	77
US Mainstream Rock Tracks (Billboard)	69

== Release history ==
Region	Date	Format(s)	Label(s)	Ref.
Australia	October 2, 1995	CD; cassette	Island	
United States	October 9, 1995	Radio	Island	
United Kingdom	October 23, 1995	7-inch vinyl; CD	Island	
