= Bringing Down the Horse =

Studio album by the Wallflowers
- Released: May 21, 1996
- Recorded: 1994–1996
- Studios: Sunset Sound, Hollywood; Groove Masters, Santa Monica; O'Henry Sound Studios, Burbank; House of Blues Sunset, West Hollywood; Brooklyn Studios, Brooklyn
- Genres: Alternative rock; roots rock
- Length: 51:14
- Label: Interscope
- Producer: T Bone Burnett

The Wallflowers chronology
The Wallflowers (1992)	Bringing Down the Horse (1996)	(Breach) (2000)

Singles from Bringing Down the Horse
- 1. "6th Avenue Heartache" Released: April 23, 1996; 2. "One Headlight" Released: January 27, 1997; 3. "The Difference" Released: 1997; 4. "Three Marlenas" Released: October 7, 1997

Bringing Down the Horse is the second album by American rock band the Wallflowers. It was released worldwide on May 21, 1996. The album was produced by T Bone Burnett and includes four singles: "6th Avenue Heartache", "One Headlight", "The Difference", and "Three Marlenas".

Bringing Down the Horse reached number four on the Billboard 200 and went quadruple platinum, becoming the Wallflowers' highest-selling album to date. Three songs from the album were nominated for Grammy Awards; in 1997 the Wallflowers received two nominations, both for "6th Avenue Heartache". In 1998 the band received three additional nominations; two for "One Headlight" and one for "The Difference". "One Headlight" won in both categories it was nominated in. The song was the band's most popular single, reaching number one on the Billboard Mainstream Rock, Modern Rock, and Adult top 40 charts. "One Headlight" is also listed at number 58 in Rolling Stone's list of the 100 Greatest Pop Songs.

Bringing Down the Horse was issued on vinyl for the first time as a double LP set for the album's 20th anniversary, released by Interscope/Universal Music Group, on May 13, 2016.

== Background ==
The Wallflowers released their debut album in 1992 on Virgin Records and subsequently parted ways with the label shortly after the album's release. The band went back to playing clubs in Los Angeles in hopes of securing another record deal. In the year it took to get another deal, the Wallflowers went through a number of personnel changes; the band's bass player Barrie Maguire and drummer Peter Yanowitz both left the band in 1993. Maguire was quickly replaced by Greg Richling, but the drummer position remained open. Soon after Yanowitz's departure, the Wallflowers were noticed by Jimmy Iovine and Tom Whalley of Interscope Records and the band was signed to the label in 1994.

== Recording ==
After multiple years away from the studio, the Wallflowers were ready to record. However, they encountered some difficulty in finding a producer willing to work with them. The band sent demo tapes to many producers and one ended up in the hands of T Bone Burnett. Burnett was impressed with what he heard and agreed to produce the band. The Wallflowers entered the studio to begin recording in 1994. Much of the album was recorded in the Los Angeles area. The band's lineup heading into the studio consisted of lead singer-songwriter/rhythm guitarist Jakob Dylan, bassist Greg Richling, keyboard player Rami Jaffee and lead guitarist Tobi Miller. Early in the sessions, however, Miller quit the band for undisclosed reasons, though he remained on good terms with the band. This left the band without a permanent lead guitarist or drummer. Those positions were temporarily filled by drummer Matt Chamberlain and a number of guitarists including Mike Campbell of Tom Petty and the Heartbreakers, Fred Tackett, Jay Joyce and Michael Ward, who would go on to become a permanent member of the group.

== Music and lyrics ==
Bringing Down the Horse further explores roots sounds heard on the band's previous self-titled album but used a more refined approach. This album features an array of instruments normally associated with roots music including banjos, dobros and pedal steel guitars. Dylan commented on the sound of the record:

You can counter different sounds and different things. We were in a certain channel already, and I do remember thinking if we mixed it organically, and we kept chasing that [Americana sound], it probably would sound dated. I wasn't interested in making a throwback record from the 60's or 70's. I didn't have any interest in doing that. And that was one of the reasons we had Tom Lord-Alge, who was a very current mixer at the time. We thought that he could counter a lot of these acoustic sounds with something that sounded really fresh and up to date.

Upon entering the studio, Dylan, who wrote all the songs for Bringing Down the Horse, had written some songs that were ready to record but needed more to complete the album. Due to the delay between the band's first album and this album, the songwriting process was staggered. Songs for Bringing Down the Horse were written in a span of roughly 5 years. One of the earliest songs, "6th Avenue Heartache", was written before the band's first album; likely around 1990. Several other songs, such as "God Don't Make Lonely Girls", were written when the band was in between labels. During recording sessions, Dylan wrote seven additional songs for the album including "One Headlight", "Bleeders", "Three Marlenas", "The Difference", "Josephine", "Invisible City", and "I Wish I Felt Nothing". On the lyrical content, Dylan stated, "Every song, fortunately or unfortunately is about feeling massively defeated, because that's what I was living." Dylan later said he wrote "I Wish I Felt Nothing" with the band's pedal steel guitarist Leo LeBlanc in mind, who was battling cancer at the time. LeBlanc had been playing with the Wallflowers for several years and was prominently featured on several songs on Bringing Down the Horse, including "Invisible City" and "I Wish I Felt Nothing". He died shortly after completing the album in 1995. Upon the album's release, the Wallflowers dedicated Bringing Down the Horse to LeBlanc.

Unlike most alternative rock at the time, Bringing Down the Horse explored reflective lyrics.

== Critical reception ==
Professional ratings
Review scores
Source	Rating
AllMusic	4.5/5 stars
Entertainment Weekly	B
The Guardian	3/5 stars
Los Angeles Times	3/4 stars
NME	7/10
Pitchfork	7.3/10
Q	3/5 stars
Rolling Stone	3/5 stars
The Rolling Stone Album Guide	4/5 stars
USA Today	3.5/4 stars

In a 2023 review, Madison Bloom of Pitchfork rated Bringing Down the Horse a 7.3 out of 10, declaring that a "stale sense of dissatisfaction" with the recording industry is present in the lyrics and highlighted several tracks that make up minor musical suites that made the album a commercial powerhouse.

Review by James Chrispell points out that only two members remain from the original band. However, he says the music is still assured and contemporary with enough of the past showing through. He feels the album is, "A fine effort indeed."

Some critics at the time questioned if the melancholic themes and measured pace would impact its longevity.

== Track listing ==
All tracks are written by Jakob Dylan except where noted.

No.	Title	Length
1.	"One Headlight"	5:13
2.	"6th Avenue Heartache"	5:37
3.	"Bleeders"	3:41
4.	"Three Marlenas"	4:59
5.	"The Difference"	3:50
6.	"Invisible City"	4:48
7.	"Laughing Out Loud"	3:39
8.	"Josephine"	5:09
9.	"God Don't Make Lonely Girls"	4:49
10.	"Angel on My Bike"	4:22
11.	"I Wish I Felt Nothing"	5:04

Japanese edition bonus tracks
No.	Title	Length
12.	"Used to Be Lucky"
13.	"6th Avenue Heartache" (acoustic)
14.	"Angel on My Bike" (Live)

Special Edition bonus tracks
No.	Title	Writer(s)	Length
12.	"Used to Be Lucky"
13.	"Heroes"	David Bowie

== Personnel ==
The Wallflowers

- Jakob Dylan – vocals, rhythm guitar
- Rami Jaffee – piano, Hammond B-3 organ, Vox Continental, upright piano
- Greg Richling – bass guitar
- Michael Ward – lead guitar
- Mario Calire – drums (credited as the band's drummer, but also noted as not performing on the record)

Additional musicians

- Matt Chamberlain – drums
- Jon Brion – lead guitar on "One Headlight"
- Stephen Bruton – background vocals on "I Wish I Felt Nothing"
- Mike Campbell – slide guitar on "6th Avenue Heartache"
- Adam Duritz – background vocals on "6th Avenue Heartache"
- Don Heffington
- Jay Joyce
- Leo LeBlanc – pedal steel guitar on "I Wish I Felt Nothing", "God Don't Make Lonely Girls" and "Invisible City"; Dobro on "One Headlight"
- Gary Louris – background vocals on "One Headlight" and "The Difference"
- Tobi Miller
- Michael Penn – background vocals on "Angel on my Bike"
- Sam Phillips – background vocals on "One Headlight" and "Laughing Out Loud"
- David Rawlings
- Fred Tackett
- Patrick Warren

Production

- Tom Lord-Alge – engineering, mixing
- T Bone Burnett – production
- Stephen Marcussen - mastering at Precision Mastering in Los Angeles, CA

== Charts ==
=== Weekly charts ===
Chart (1996–1997)	Peak position
Australian Albums (ARIA)	9
Austrian Albums (Ö3 Austria)	40
Canadian Albums (Billboard)	6
New Zealand Albums (RMNZ)	1
Swedish Albums (Sverigetopplistan)	12
UK Albums (Official Charts)	58
US Billboard 200	4
US Heatseekers Albums (Billboard)	1

=== Year-end charts ===
Chart (1997)	Position
Australian Albums (ARIA)	81
Canadian Albums (Nielsen Soundscan)	19
New Zealand Albums (RMNZ)	14
US Billboard 200	7
Chart (1998)	Position
US Billboard 200	137

=== Decade-end charts ===
Chart (1990–1999)	Position
US Billboard 200	86

== Certifications ==
Region	Certification	Certified units/sales
Australia (ARIA)	Gold	35,000^{^}
New Zealand (RMNZ)	Gold	7,500^{‡}
United States (RIAA)	4× Platinum	4,000,000^{^}
^{^} Shipments figures based on certification alone.

== Release history ==
Region	Date	Label	Format	Catalog
United States	May 21, 1996	Interscope	CD, cassette tape	90055
Canada and Europe	June 1996	MCA	Compact Disc, cassette tape	
United Kingdom	August 1996	MCA	Compact Disc, cassette tape	
Japan†	September 1997	Universal/MCA	Compact Disc	24018

†This version contains bonus tracks
