= 6th Avenue Heartache =

1996 single by the Wallflowers

Single by the Wallflowers

from the album Bringing Down the Horse
- B-side: "Used to Be Lucky"; "Angel on My Bike"
- Released: April 23, 1996
- Genre: Roots rock; alternative rock
- Length: 5:37
- Label: Interscope
- Songwriter: Jakob Dylan
- Producer: T-Bone Burnett

The Wallflowers singles chronology
"6th Avenue Heartache" (1996)	"One Headlight" (1997)

Music video
- "6th Avenue Heartache" on YouTube

"6th Avenue Heartache" is a song by the American rock band the Wallflowers. The background vocals in this song were performed by Adam Duritz from Counting Crows. It was released in April 1996 as the lead single from their second album, Bringing Down the Horse. The song became their first hit, peaking at No. 8 on the US Billboard Modern Rock Tracks chart, No. 33 on the Billboard Hot 100 Airplay chart, and No. 2 on the Billboard Triple-A chart—it was the most-played song on triple-A radio in 1996. "6th Avenue Heartache" was nominated for Best Rock Song and Best Rock Performance at the 39th Annual Grammy Awards.

== Background and writing ==
Jakob Dylan, the band's lead singer, wrote the song when he was 18 years old and considers it the first real song he had written. It was intended to appear on the band's self-titled first album, but their label at the time, Virgin Records, would not allow it. The lyrics are based on Dylan's own experiences while living in New York City, in particular the story of a homeless man who would sit outside Dylan's window and play the same songs every day. One day, the man was gone, but his things were still there, until gradually people started taking them. Mike Campbell from Tom Petty and the Heartbreakers played the slide guitar on the song, though he recorded the track in his own studio and never even met the band members.

== Music video ==
The video, shot in New York, was directed by movie director David Fincher, known for such films as Se7en and Fight Club. There is a slight error in the video: Rama's Cafe, portrayed as a meeting place for the band, was actually on 281 5th Avenue, not 6th Avenue. The building was eventually demolished, and an apartment building has since taken its place.

== Track listing ==
1. "6th Avenue Heartache" (edit) – 4:22
2. "Used to Be Lucky" – 6:35
3. "Angel on My Bike" – 4:22
4. "6th Avenue Heartache" – 5:37

== Charts ==
=== Weekly charts ===
Chart (1996–1997)	Peak position
Australia (ARIA)	162
Canada Top Singles (RPM)	8
US Radio Songs (Billboard)	33
US Adult Alternative Airplay (Billboard)	2
US Adult Pop Airplay (Billboard)	26
US Alternative Airplay (Billboard)	8
US Mainstream Rock (Billboard)	10
US Pop Airplay (Billboard)	25

=== Year-end charts ===
Chart (1996)	Position
US Mainstream Rock Tracks (Billboard)	30
US Modern Rock Tracks (Billboard)	45
US Triple-A (Billboard)	1

== In popular culture ==
It was featured during the Friends season 4 episode "The One with the Fake Party".

It was featured in the Cold Case season 2 episode "Revenge".

The Wallflowers performed "6th Avenue Heartache" on The Late Show with David Letterman in 1996.

In 2012, the Wallflowers reunited to perform the song as part of Letterman's online concert series Live on Letterman.
