= One Headlight =

1997 single by the Wallflowers

Single by the Wallflowers

from the album Bringing Down the Horse
- B-side: "6th Avenue Heartache" (acoustic); "Angel on My Bike" (live)
- Released: January 21, 1997
- Genre: Alternative rock; pop rock; roots rock
- Length: 5:13 (album version); 4:38 (single version)
- Label: Interscope
- Songwriter: Jakob Dylan
- Producer: T Bone Burnett

The Wallflowers singles chronology
"6th Avenue Heartache" (1996)	"One Headlight" (1997)	"The Difference" (1997)

Music video
- "One Headlight" on YouTube

"One Headlight" is a song by American rock band the Wallflowers. The song was written by lead singer Jakob Dylan, and produced by T Bone Burnett. It was released to radio in January 1997 as the second single and opening track from the band's second studio album, Bringing Down the Horse (1996).

The song was the first single to reach No. 1 on all three of Billboard's rock airplay charts: the Modern Rock Tracks chart, the Mainstream Rock Songs chart, and the Triple-A chart. "One Headlight" also stayed at No. 1 in Canada for five weeks. In 2000, the song was listed at No. 58 on Rolling Stone and MTV's list of the "100 Greatest Pop Songs of All Time", and Billboard ranked it as No. 1 on its 2021 list of the "Greatest Adult Alternative Songs".

== Background ==
The song was written by lead vocalist Jakob Dylan, and is the second to be written during the recording of Bringing Down the Horse in Los Angeles. Dylan has stated that the song is about "the death of ideas". Dylan did not intend to write a hit song, but wrote it with the intention of wanting to impress and work with a producer. He was able to share the song with him, and thought the producer enjoyed the song, but Dylan did not hear back from the producer after he left. He began writing this song after a recent record with Virgin Records was considered a disappointment. Feeling the band deserved a second chance, he wrote the song at a kitchen table in Los Angeles. He was inspired by Leon Russell, Dr. John, and Al Green, and felt there was a "place for that type of feeling and mood on the radio." Some lyrics were inspired by that of Bruce Springsteen, with references to "Independence Day" (1981) and "One Step Up" (1988).

== Music video ==
The music video was filmed in New York City in February 1997 and features the band performing. They had made a previous version of the video, which Dylan described as a "murky representation", which he did not enjoy watching as he was reviewing the footage. They had eventually filmed the video in Dumbo, Brooklyn.

== Chart performance ==
Although the song did not chart on the US Billboard Hot 100 due to the chart rules regarding singles at the time, it was a significant radio hit. It spent five weeks at No. 2 on the Billboard Hot 100 Airplay chart and a total of 70 weeks on the chart. In March 1997, it became the first song to top all three of Billboard's rock airplay charts—the Modern Rock Tracks, Mainstream Rock Tracks, and Triple-A charts. In Canada, the song reached No. 1 on the RPM 100 Hit Tracks chart, staying there for five weeks and ending 1997 as the third-most-successful song of the year. Outside North America, the song reached No. 14 in Australia and became a moderate hit in Iceland and the United Kingdom.

== Accolades ==
The song won two Grammy Awards at the 40th Annual Grammy Awards, Best Rock Song and Best Rock Performance by a Duo or Group. The song was performed live at the 1997 MTV Video Music Awards with Bruce Springsteen, where the music video was nominated four times, including for Viewer's Choice.

Year	Association	Category	Result
1998	Grammy Awards	Best Rock Song	Won
1998	Grammy Awards	Best Rock Performance by a Duo or Group with Vocals	Won

== Track listings ==
Australian CD single; UK 7-inch and CD single

1. "One Headlight" (radio edit) – 4:38
2. "6th Avenue Heartache" (acoustic) – 4:47
3. "Angel on My Bike" (live) – 4:46

European CD single

1. "One Headlight" (radio edit)
2. "Angel on My Bike" (live)

== Charts ==
=== Weekly charts ===
Chart (1997)	Peak position
Australia (ARIA)	14
Canada Top Singles (RPM)	1
Germany (GfK)	88
Iceland (Íslenski Listinn Topp 40)	29
Italy Airplay (Music & Media)	6
Scottish Singles Sales (Official Charts)	58
UK Singles (Official Charts)	54
US Radio Songs (Billboard)	2
US Adult Alternative Airplay (Billboard)	1
US Adult Contemporary (Billboard)	30
US Adult Pop Airplay (Billboard)	1
US Alternative Airplay (Billboard)	1
US Mainstream Rock (Billboard)	1
US Pop Airplay (Billboard)	2

=== Year-end charts ===
Chart (1997)	Position
Australia (ARIA)	60
Canada Top Singles (RPM)	3
US Hot 100 Airplay (Billboard)	5
US Adult Top 40 (Billboard)	2
US Mainstream Rock Tracks (Billboard)	3
US Modern Rock Tracks (Billboard)	6
US Top 40/Mainstream (Billboard)	8
US Triple-A (Billboard)	1

Chart (1998)	Position
US Adult Top 40 (Billboard)	58

== Certifications ==
Region	Certification	Certified units/sales
Australia (ARIA)	Gold	35,000^{^}
New Zealand (RMNZ)	2× Platinum	60,000^{‡}
^{^} Shipments figures based on certification alone.^{‡} Sales+streaming figures based on certification alone.

== Release history ==
Region	Date	Format(s)	Label(s)	Ref.
United States	January 21, 1997	Contemporary hit radio	Interscope	
Australia	April 28, 1997	CD	Interscope	
United Kingdom	June 30, 1997	7-inch vinyl; CD	Interscope	
Japan	September 22, 1997	CD	Interscope	

== See also ==
- List of Billboard Modern Rock Tracks number ones of the 1990s
- List of number-one singles of 1997 (Canada)
