= Pam Thomas =

Canadian-born television producer, director, and casting director

Pamela Thomas is a Canadian-born television producer, director, and casting director. She served as a co-producer for The Kids in the Hall from 1988 to 1995 and has also served as a producer on I'm With Bugsey and Saturday Night Live, among others - including Sex and the City. In 2006, she directed an episode of Desperate Housewives. She was the first wife of Dave Thomas.
