= Come to My Window =

1993 single by Melissa Etheridge

Single by Melissa Etheridge

from the album Yes I Am
- Released: 1993
- Studio: A&M (Hollywood, California)
- Length: 3:55 (album version); 3:35 (edit)
- Label: Island
- Songwriter: Melissa Etheridge
- Producers: Hugh Padgham; Melissa Etheridge

Melissa Etheridge singles chronology
"I'm the Only One" (1993)	"Come to My Window" (1993)	"All American Girl" (1994)

Music video
- "Come to My Window" on YouTube

"Come to My Window" is a song by American singer-songwriter Melissa Etheridge, released in 1993 by Island Records as the second single from her fourth studio album, Yes I Am (1993). The song was written and co-produced by Etheridge with Hugh Padgham, and was the first song to become a hit after Etheridge publicly announced that she was a lesbian. With the driving force of gay rights, the song gained substantial airplay on radio stations, mostly through call-in requests.

"Come to My Window" reached number 25 on the US Billboard Hot 100 chart and stayed on the chart for 44 weeks. The song also charted in Canada, reaching number 13 on the RPM Top Singles chart. It was the second song from Etheridge that earned her a Grammy Award for Best Female Rock Vocal Performance. The accompanying music video was directed by Samuel Bayer, featuring Juliette Lewis, and received a nomination at the 1994 Billboard Music Video Awards. In 2019 and 2025, Billboard magazine included "Come to My Window" in its lists of the "30 Lesbian Love Songs" and "100 Greatest LGBTQ+ Anthems of All Time".

== Song information ==
When the song was being promoted, a portion of the song's beginning was omitted. This was to help accommodate some radio stations that wanted an instrumental beginning rather than a vocal one. The song's lyrics describes the intense love that Etheridge has for another person. It describes situations that she is willing to endure and how happy the other person makes her feel. In addition, the song implicitly alludes to the singer's sexual orientation and activism by the lyrics:

"I don't care what they think.
I don't care what they say.
What do they know about this love, anyway?"

Etheridge tells both in her autobiography and during the interview on the bonus DVD of her greatest hits album that out of all songs she has written, "Come to My Window" is the one that surprises her the most, and that she almost did not put it on the album. She states that while she wrote the song, she did not realize what she was actually writing and that it was not before meeting Tammy Lynn Michaels that she understood what this song means to other people. She also says that it has the best musical bridge part of all her songs.

The sound effect at the beginning was created by Mauricio Fritz Lewak who put coins inside of a pair of clash cymbals. This song was also about her girlfriend at the time.

== Reaction ==
=== Critical reception ===
Dave Sholin from the Gavin Report wrote "Singer/songwriter extraordinaire, Melissa Etheridge is never short on provocative imagery in any of her songs. She delivers one of her most powerful yet, which is supported by an equally riveting video." Pan-European magazine Music & Media commented, "Melissa goes mellow, but her massive voice remains a major danger for crystal glasses. In short, the same things happen when you programme Rod Stewart." Alan Jones from Music Week stated, "Deserving to be her first British hit, this strong, folksy but gutsy rock number has spent the last 36 weeks in the US Hot 100, propelling its parent Yes I Am album past platinum. Etheridge whips up a storm, and has the ability to become a leading rock chick." Sam Wood from Philadelphia Inquirer felt "Come to My Window" "features the same annoying strummed tag line that seems to infect too much of what is called women's music. Etheridge may have intended to pay homage to her ghettoized sisters, but flaunting the contrived, amateurish chordal figure does nothing to add to the authenticity of the song. It just sinks it."

=== Accolades ===
Year	Award	Category	Result	Ref.
1995	Grammy Award	Best Female Rock Vocal Performance	Won	
1995	Grammy Award	Best Rock Song	Nominated	
1996	ASCAP Pop Music Award	Most Performed Songs	Won	

== Music video ==
The black-and-white music video for "Come to My Window", directed by American visual artist, cinematographer, and commercial, music video and film director Samuel Bayer, cuts between a mental patient played by actress Juliette Lewis and Etheridge playing her guitar and singing. The video also features "child-like" drawings in certain scenes. According to an episode of VH1's Pop Up Video, these drawings were created by a crew member's five-year-old daughter. Additionally, the video was to have included an appearance by a little girl; the mental patient's "lost childhood". While the appearance was filmed, it got lost during editing. "Come to My Window" was nominated for Best Clip of the Year in the category for Rock at the 1994 Billboard Music Video Awards.

== Live performances ==
Etheridge performed "Come to My Window" during The Concert for New York City, the benefit concert following the September 11, 2001 attacks. The song was played by the World Wrestling Federation in the background of a tribute to wrestler Owen Hart who died during a match.

Etheridge also appeared on an episode of The Real Housewives of Beverly Hills, singing "Come to My Window" at a fundraiser for Homeless Not Toothless at Dorit and Paul Kemsley's home.

== Track listings ==
All songs were written by Melissa Etheridge.

- US and UK CD single
1. "Come to My Window" – 3:55
2. "Ain't It Heavy" (live) – 5:34
3. "The Letting Go" (live) – 3:51
4. "I'm the Only One" (live) – 5:30
- US and Canadian cassette single
1. "Come to My Window" – 3:55
2. "Ain't It Heavy" (live) – 5:34
- European and Australian CD single
1. "Come to My Window" – 3:55
2. "Ain't It Heavy" (live) – 5:34
3. "The Letting Go" (live) – 3:51

== Credits and personnel ==
- Vocals and acoustic guitar by Melissa Etheridge
- Drums and percussion by Mauricio Fritz Lewak
- Electric guitar by Waddy Wachtel
- Keyboards by Scott Thurston
- Bass by Pino Palladino
- Engineering by Hugh Padgham
- Assistant engineering by Greg Goldman, John Aguto, Mike Baumgartner
- Mixing by Hugh Padgham
- Mastered by Bob Ludwig at Gateway Mastering

== Charts ==
=== Weekly charts ===
Chart (1994–1995)	Peak position
Canada Retail Singles (The Record)	16
Canada Top Singles (RPM)	13
Quebec (ADISQ)	11
US Billboard Hot 100	25
US Adult Contemporary (Billboard)	4
US Adult Pop Airplay (Billboard)	27
US Mainstream Rock (Billboard)	22
US Pop Airplay (Billboard)	13
US Cash Box Top 100	15

=== Year-end charts ===
Chart (1994)	Position
Canada Top Singles (RPM)	91
US Billboard Hot 100	43
US Adult Contemporary (Billboard)	24

== Certifications ==
Region	Certification	Certified units/sales
United States (RIAA)	Gold	500,000^{‡}
^{‡} Sales+streaming figures based on certification alone.

== Release history ==
Region	Date	Format(s)	Label(s)	Ref.
United States	1993	CD; cassette	Island	
Australia	January 31, 1994	CD; cassette	Island	
United Kingdom	October 24, 1994	CD; cassette	Island	

== Other versions ==
In 1997, the John Tesh Project featuring Brandon Fields on saxophone, covered the song from their album "Sax All Night."
