= Grammy Award for Best Rock Song =

Honor presented to recording artists for quality rock songs

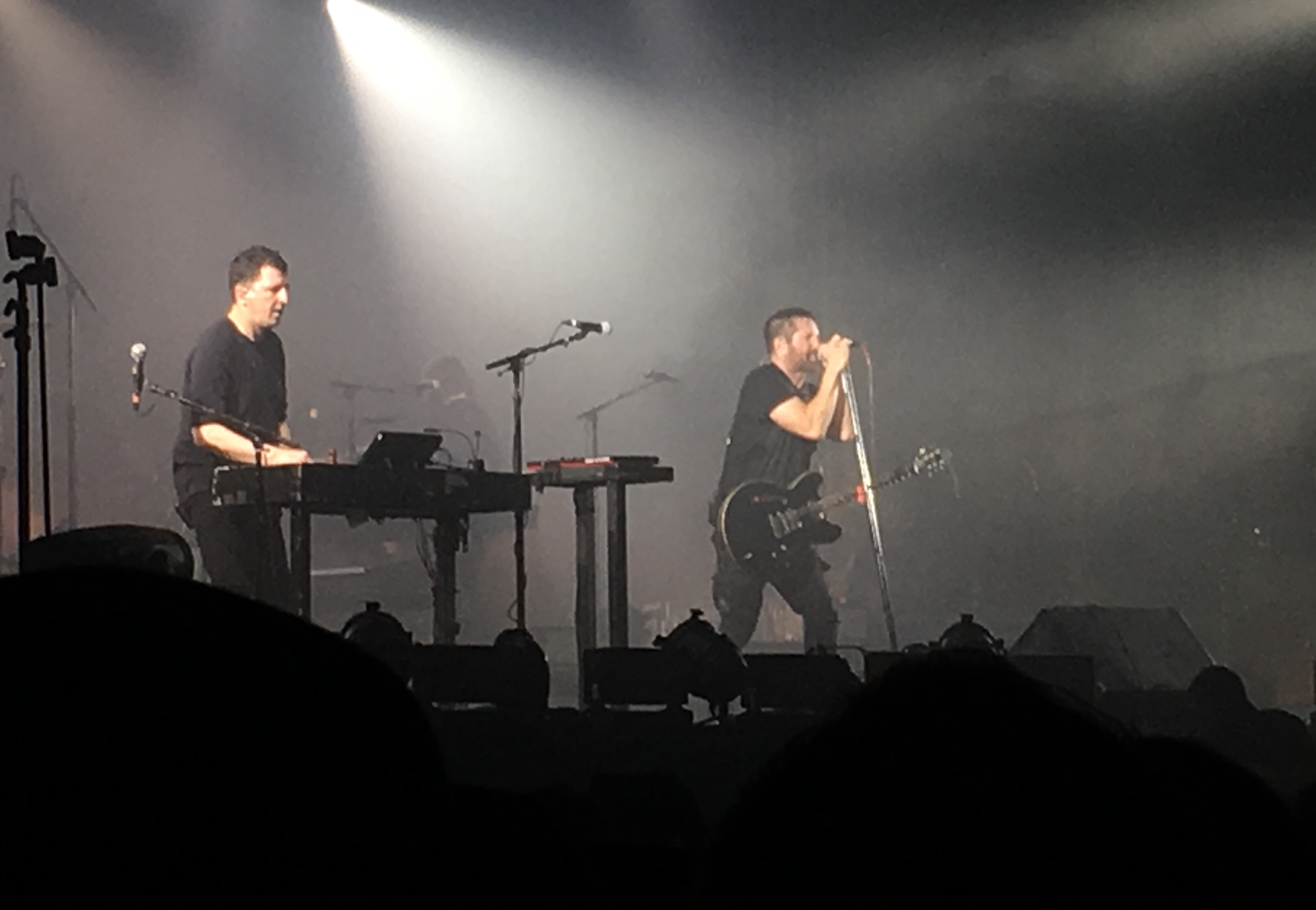
- "As Alive as You Need Me to Be" by Nine Inch Nails is the most recent recipient
- Awarded for: High-quality rock music songs
- Country: United States
- Presented by: National Academy of Recording Arts and Sciences
- First award: 1992
- Currently held by: Nine Inch Nails — "As Alive as You Need Me to Be" (2026)
- Website: grammy.com

The Grammy Award for Best Rock Song is an honor presented at the Grammy Awards, a ceremony that was established in 1958 and originally called the Gramophone Awards, to recording artists for quality songs in the rock music genre. Honors in several categories are presented at the ceremony annually by the National Academy of Recording Arts and Sciences of the United States to "honor artistic achievement, technical proficiency and overall excellence in the recording industry, without regard to album sales or chart position".

The award, reserved for songwriters, was first presented to English musician Sting in 1992. According to the category description guide for the 52nd Grammy Awards, the award honors new songs (containing both melody and lyrics) or songs "first achieving prominence" during the period of eligibility. Songs containing prominent samples or interpolations are not eligible.

The award goes to the songwriter. If the song contains samples or interpolations of earlier songs, the publisher and the original songwriter(s) can apply for a Winners Certificate.

Bruce Springsteen, Dave Grohl and Pat Smear hold the record for the most wins, having won four awards each. Springsteen also holds the record for most nominations with nine. Other winners of multiple awards include the other members of Foo Fighters (Taylor Hawkins, Nate Mendel and Chris Shiflett) with three wins, and Alanis Morissette and the bands Red Hot Chili Peppers and U2, each with two. Award-winning songs have been performed by American artists more than any other nationality, though they have also been performed by musicians or groups originating from Canada, Ireland, and the United Kingdom. There have been four instances in which one artist or group was nominated for two works in the same year: the group Aerosmith was nominated for both "Cryin'" and "Livin' on the Edge" in 1994, Melissa Etheridge received nominations for "Come to My Window" and "I'm the Only One" in 1995, Jakob Dylan of the Wallflowers won for "One Headlight" and was also nominated for "The Difference" in 1998, and U2 was nominated for the songs "Elevation" and "Walk On" in 2002. Chad Smith also received two nominations in 2023, receiving songwriting credits for the Red Hot Chili Peppers and Ozzy Osbourne songs nominated. Coldplay holds the record for the most nominations without a win, with four.

== Recipients ==
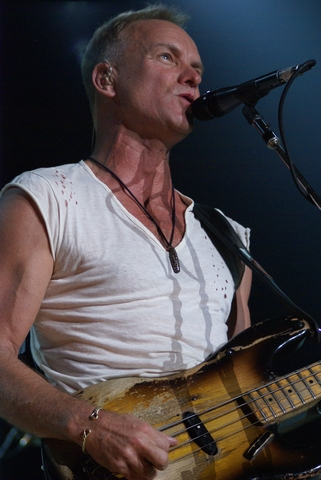
Sting became the first award recipient in 1992 for the song "The Soul Cages".

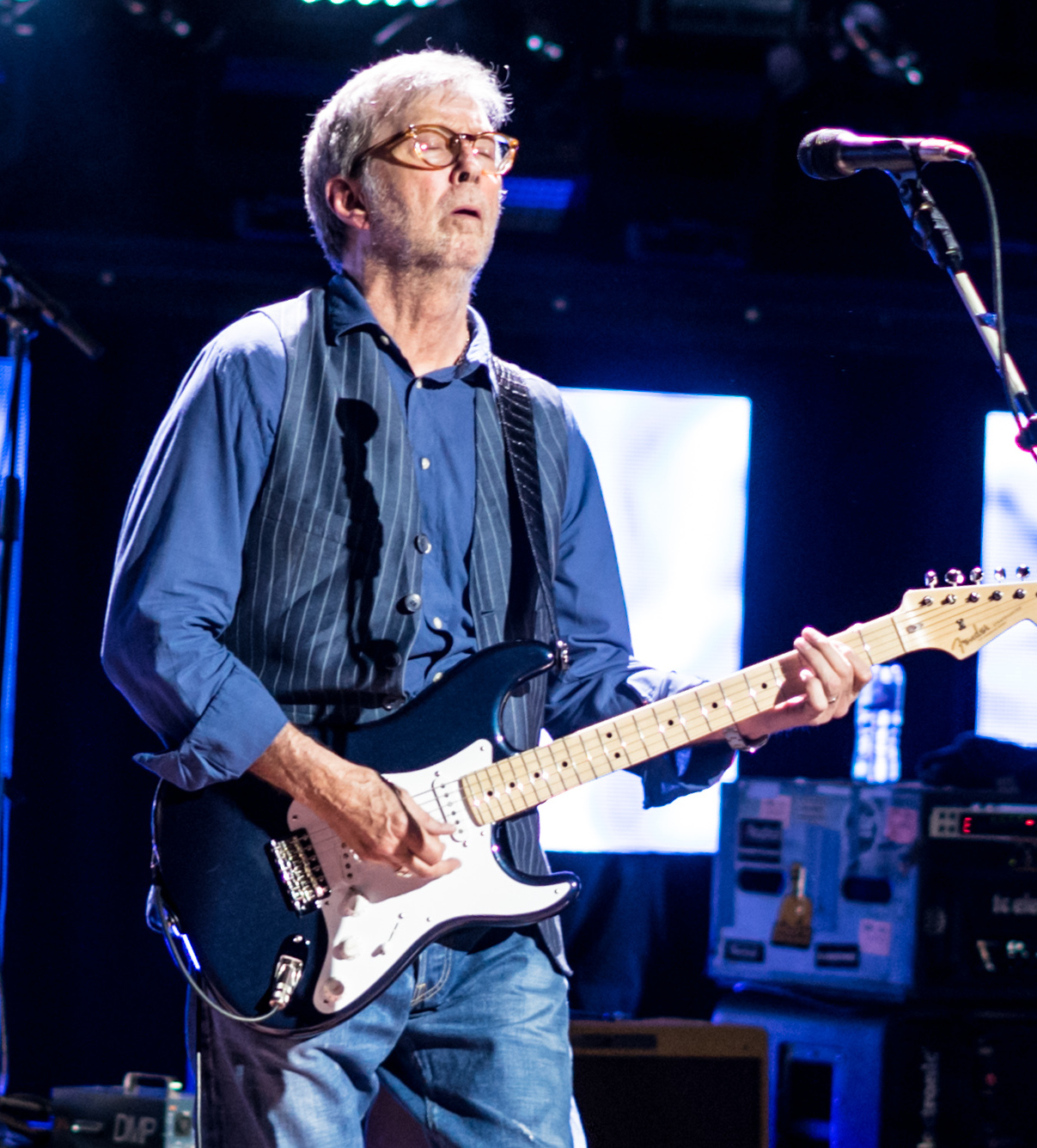
Eric Clapton, 1993 award recipient for the song "Layla", performing in 2017

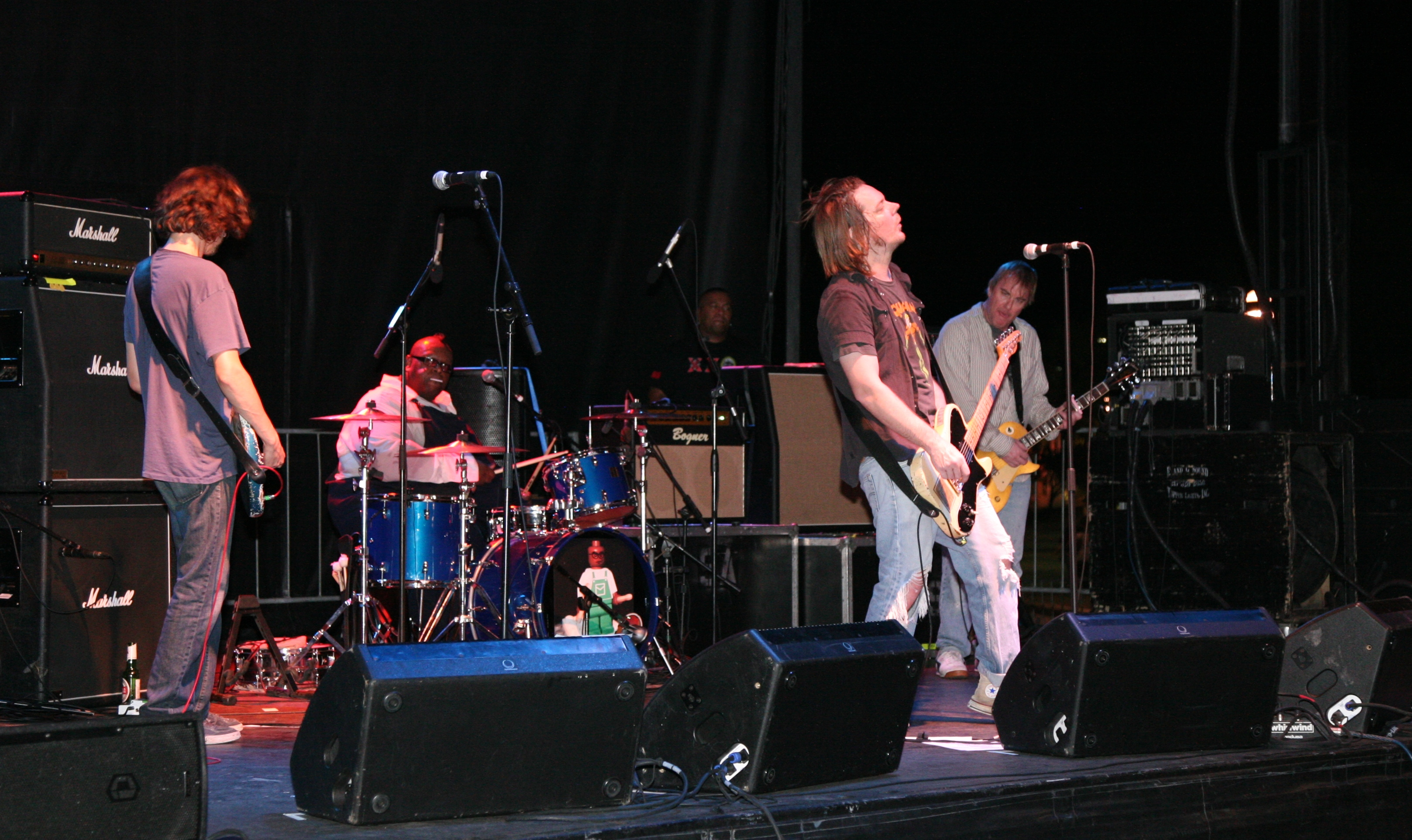
Members of the 1994 award-winning band Soul Asylum in 2010

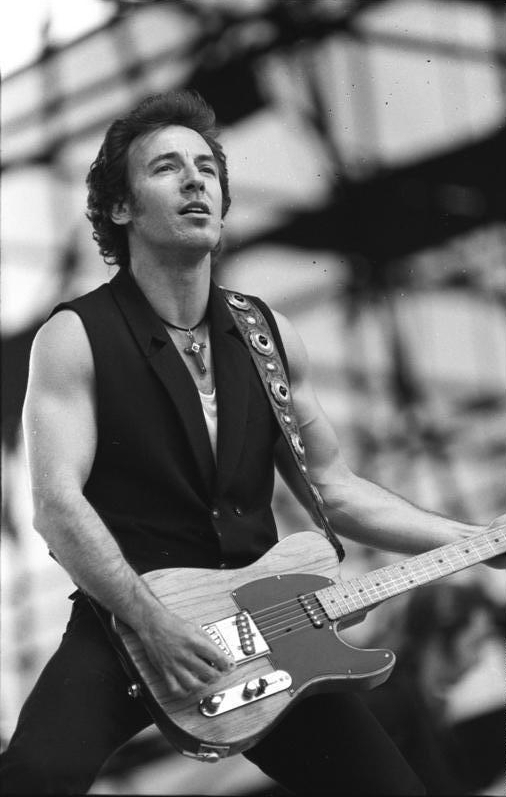
Four-time award winner Bruce Springsteen, performing in 1988

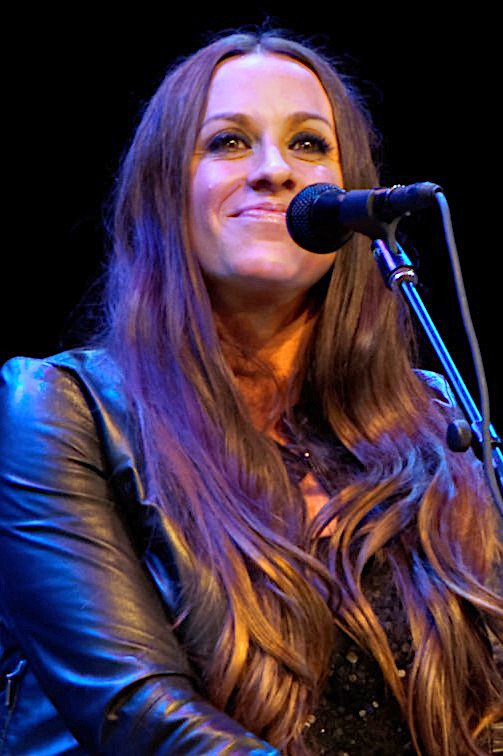
Two-time award recipient Alanis Morissette, performing in 2014

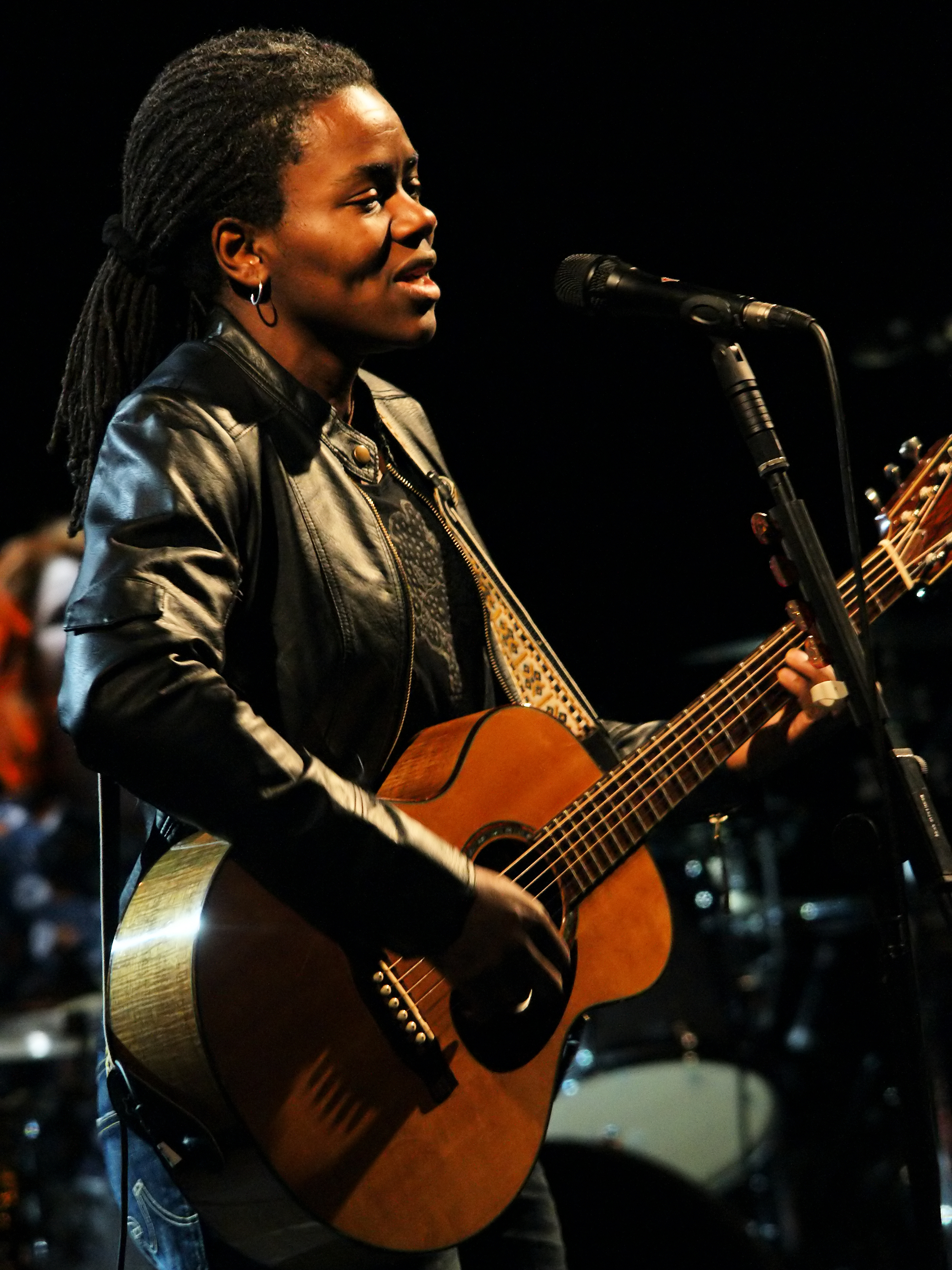
1997 award recipient Tracy Chapman at the 2009 Cactus Festival in Bruges, Belgium

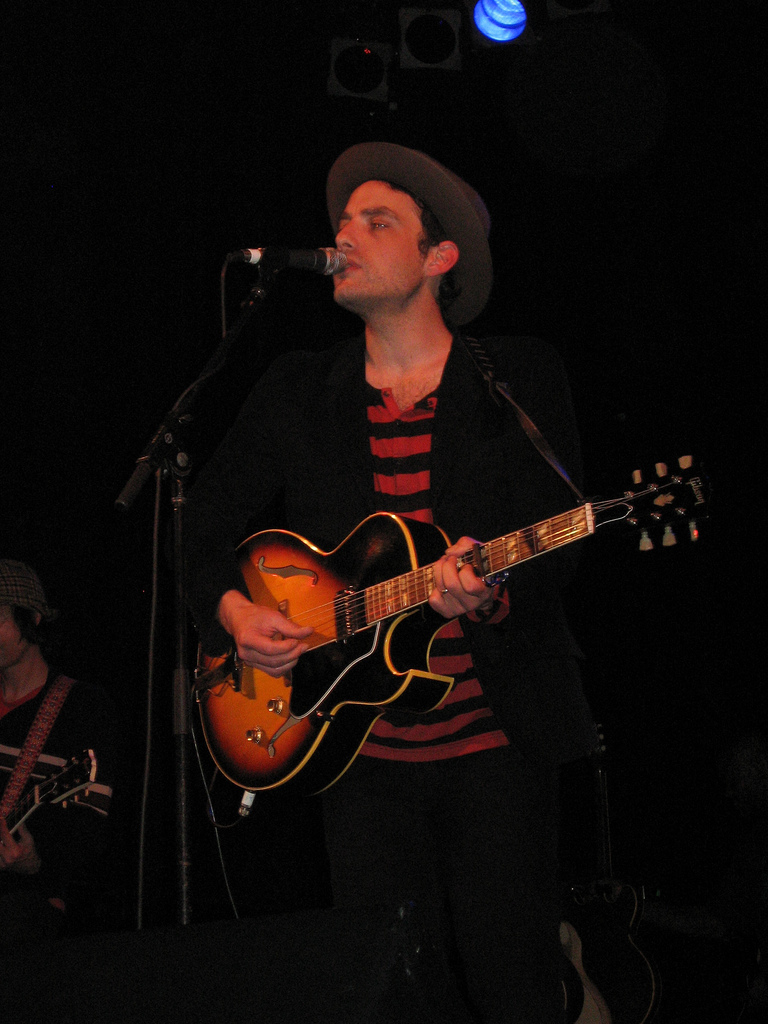
Jakob Dylan, 1998 award winner for the song "One Headlight" and member of The Wallflowers, performing in 2007

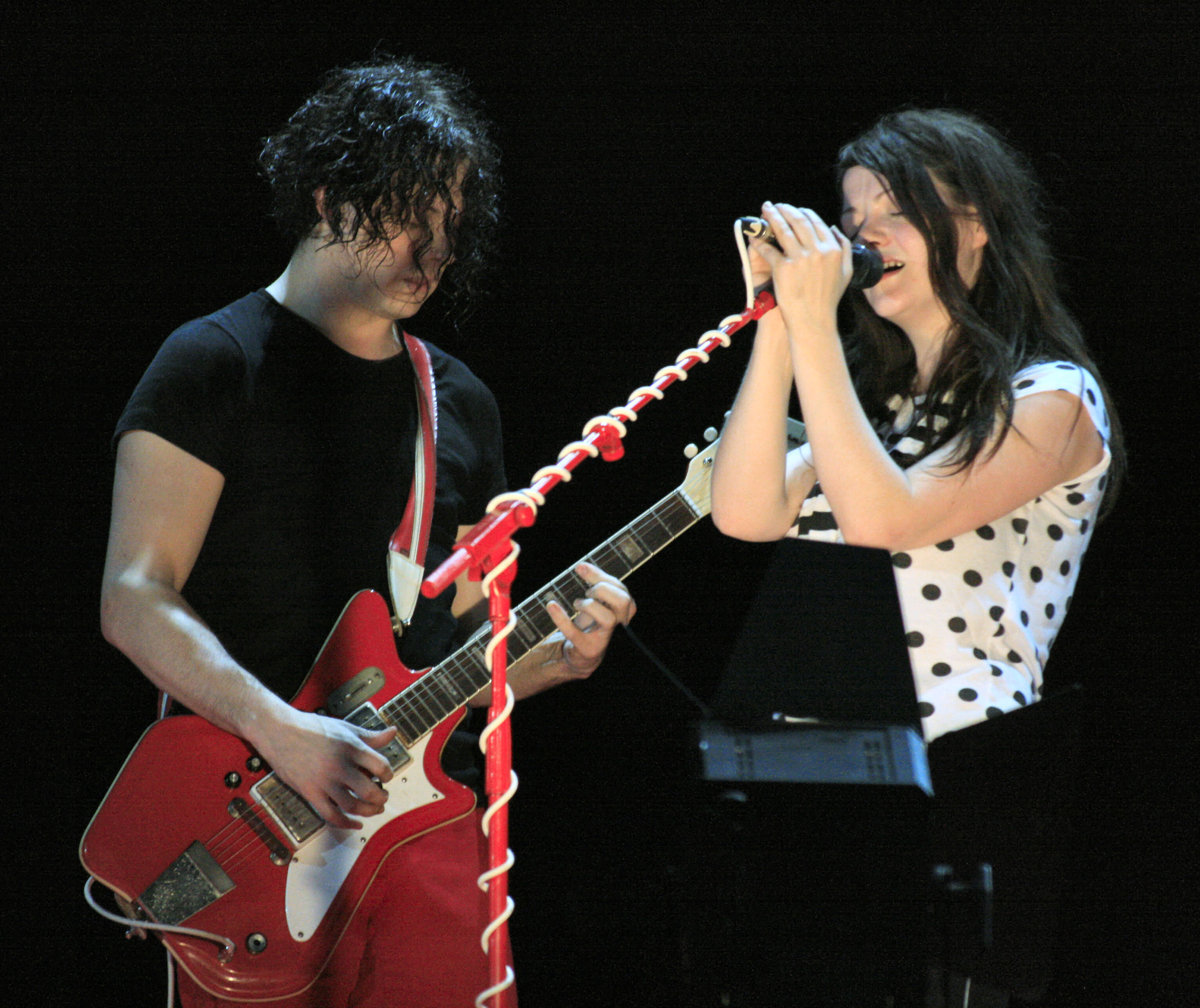
Jack White and Meg White of the 2004 award-winning band The White Stripes

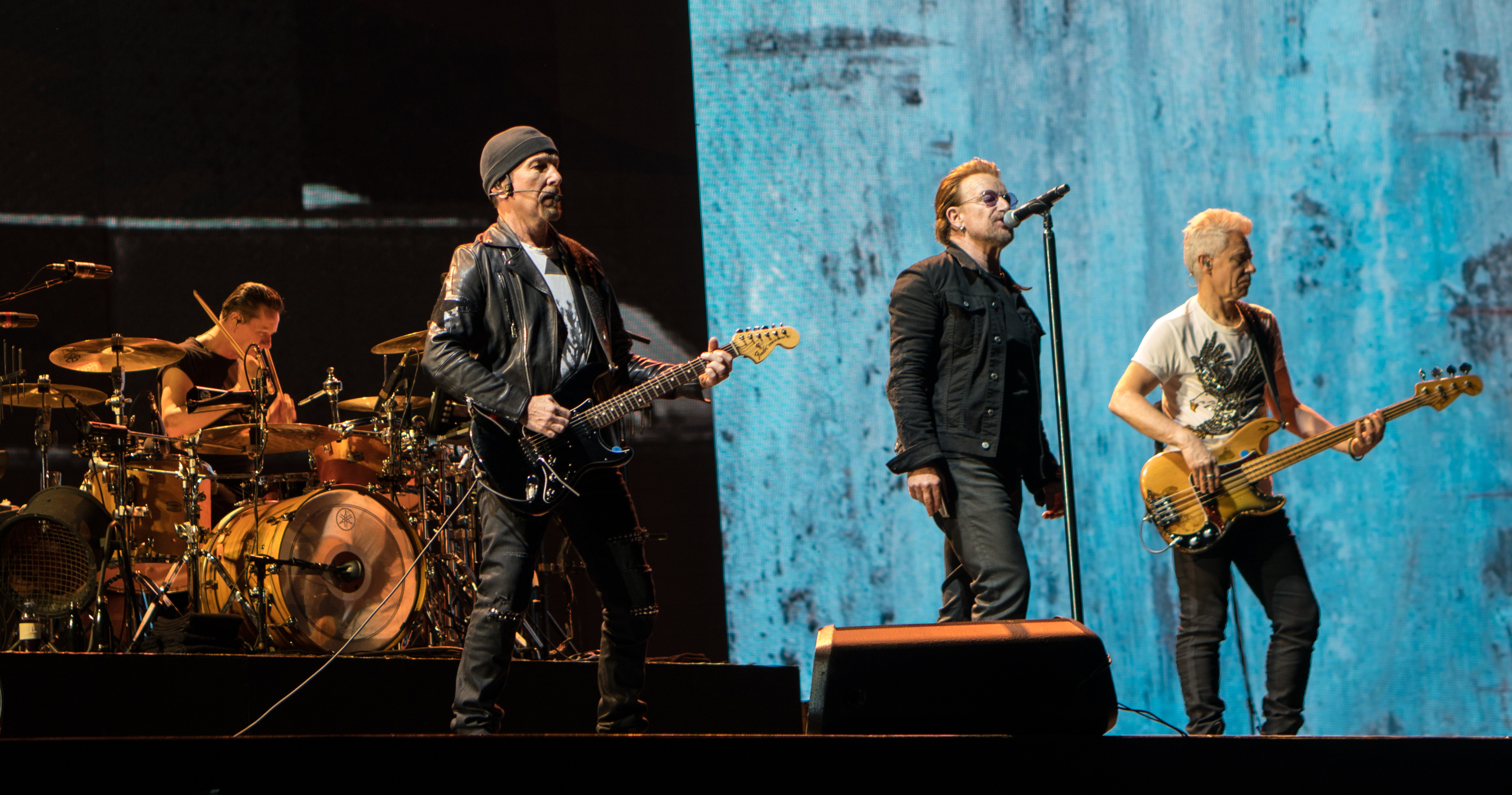
Members of the two-time award-winning band U2, performing on the Joshua Tree Tour 2017. From left to right: Larry Mullen Jr. (drumming), the Edge, Bono, and Adam Clayton

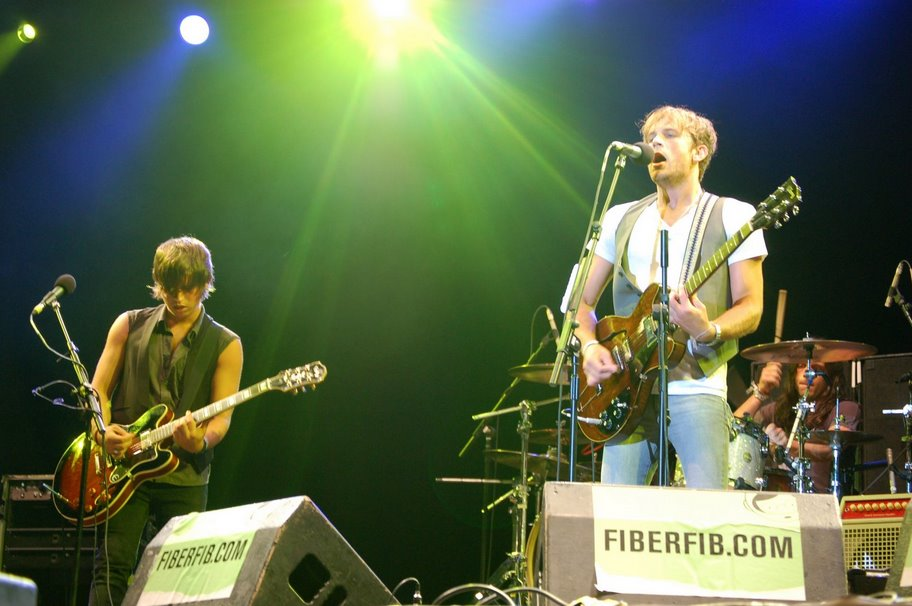
From left to right, Matthew, Caleb, and Nathan Followill of the 2010 award-winning band Kings of Leon, performing in 2007

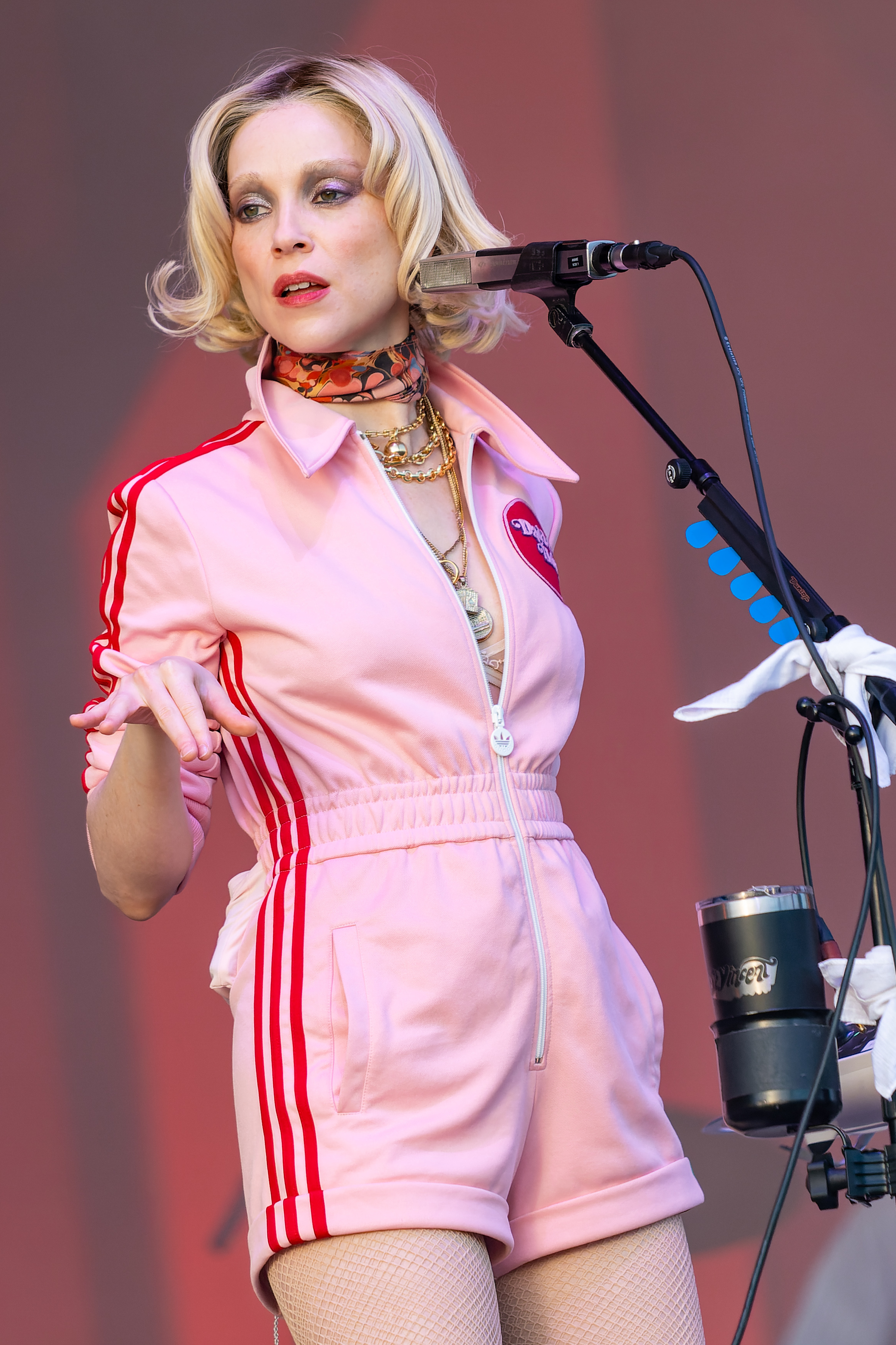
2019 recipient St. Vincent performing at Glastonbury (2022)

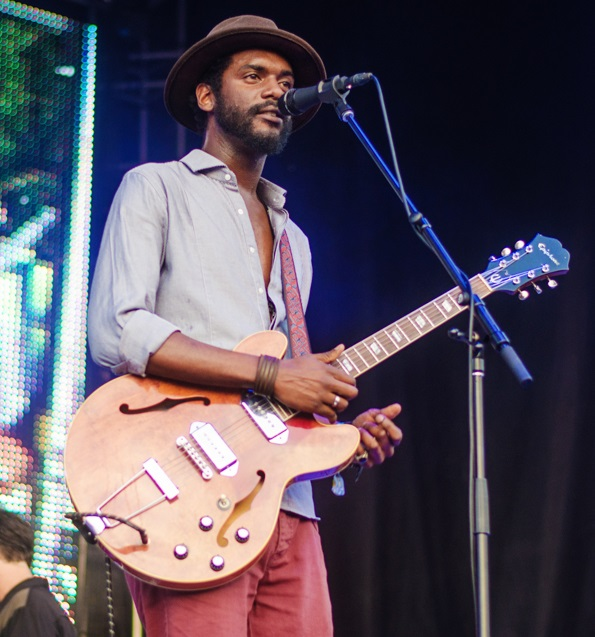
2020 recipient Gary Clark Jr. performing in 2013

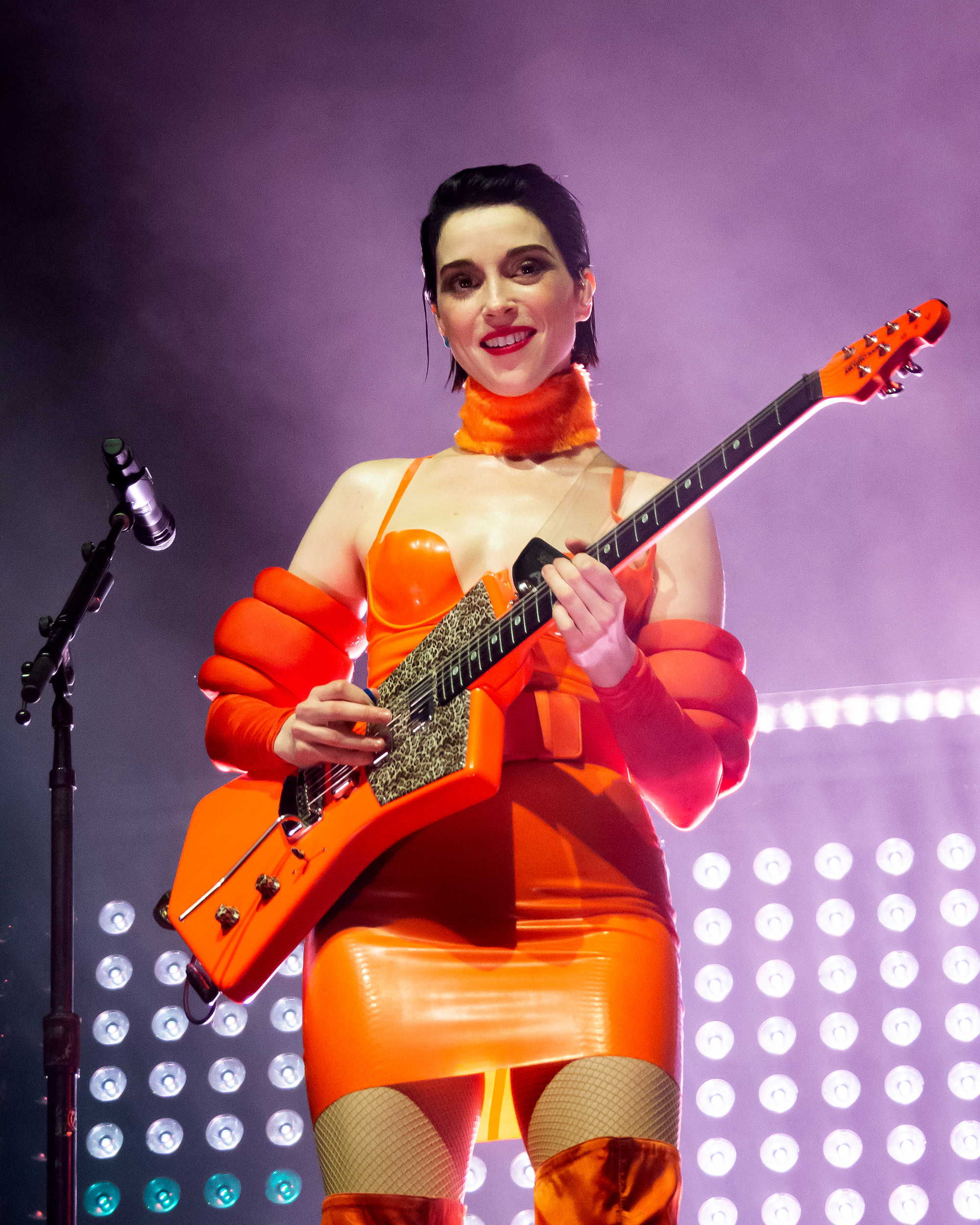
2024 recipient St. Vincent performing in 2018

=== 1990s ===
Year	Song	Songwriter(s)	Artist(s)
1992
1992	"The Soul Cages"	Sting	Sting
1992	"Been Caught Stealing"	Eric Avery and Perry Farrell	Jane's Addiction
1992	"Can't Stop This Thing We Started"	Bryan Adams and Mutt Lange	Bryan Adams
1992	"Enter Sandman"	Kirk Hammett, James Hetfield and Lars Ulrich	Metallica
1992	"Learning to Fly"	Tom Petty	Tom Petty and the Heartbreakers
1992	"Silent Lucidity"	Chris DeGarmo	Queensrÿche
1993
1993	"Layla" (Unplugged Version)	Eric Clapton and Jim Gordon	Eric Clapton
1993	"Digging in the Dirt"	Peter Gabriel	Peter Gabriel
1993	"Human Touch"	Bruce Springsteen	Bruce Springsteen
1993	"Jeremy"	Eddie Vedder and Jeff Ament	Pearl Jam
1993	"Smells Like Teen Spirit"	Kurt Cobain	Nirvana
1994
1994	"Runaway Train"	Dave Pirner	Soul Asylum
1994	"Are You Gonna Go My Way"	Lenny Kravitz and Craig Ross	Lenny Kravitz
1994	"Cryin'"	Steven Tyler, Joe Perry and Taylor Rhodes	Aerosmith
1994	"I'd Do Anything for Love (But I Won't Do That)"	Jim Steinman	Meat Loaf
1994	"Livin' on the Edge"	Steven Tyler, Joe Perry and Mark Hudson	Aerosmith
1995
1995	"Streets of Philadelphia"	Bruce Springsteen	Bruce Springsteen
1995	"All Apologies"	Kurt Cobain	Nirvana
1995	"Black Hole Sun"	Chris Cornell	Soundgarden
1995	"Come to My Window"	Melissa Etheridge	Melissa Etheridge
1995	"I'm the Only One"	Melissa Etheridge	Melissa Etheridge
1996
1996	"You Oughta Know"	Alanis Morissette and Glen Ballard	Alanis Morissette
1996	"Dignity"	Bob Dylan	Bob Dylan
1996	"Downtown"	Neil Young	Neil Young
1996	"Hold Me, Thrill Me, Kiss Me, Kill Me"	Bono	U2
1996	"Hurt"	Trent Reznor	Nine Inch Nails
1997
1997	"Give Me One Reason"	Tracy Chapman	Tracy Chapman
1997	"Cry Love"	John Hiatt	John Hiatt
1997	"6th Avenue Heartache"	Jakob Dylan	The Wallflowers
1997	"Stupid Girl"	Duke Erikson, Shirley Manson, Steve Marker and Butch Vig	Garbage
1997	"Too Much"	Carter Beauford, Stefan Lessard, Dave Matthews, LeRoi Moore and Boyd Tinsley	Dave Matthews Band
1997	"Wonderwall"	Noel Gallagher	Oasis
1998
1998	"One Headlight"	Jakob Dylan	The Wallflowers
1998	"Bitch"	Meredith Brooks and Shelly Peiken	Meredith Brooks
1998	"Crash into Me"	Dave Matthews	Dave Matthews Band
1998	"Criminal"	Fiona Apple	Fiona Apple
1998	"The Difference"	Jakob Dylan	The Wallflowers
1999
1999	"Uninvited"	Alanis Morissette	Alanis Morissette
1999	"Bitter Sweet Symphony"	Richard Ashcroft, Mick Jagger and Keith Richards	The Verve
1999	"Celebrity Skin"	Billy Corgan, Eric Erlandson and Courtney Love	Hole
1999	"Closing Time"	Dan Wilson	Semisonic
1999	"Have a Little Faith in Me"	John Hiatt	John Hiatt

=== 2000s ===
Year	Song	Songwriter(s)	Artist(s)
2000
2000	"Scar Tissue"	Flea, John Frusciante, Anthony Kiedis and Chad Smith	Red Hot Chili Peppers
2000	"Angels Would Fall"	Melissa Etheridge and John Shanks	Melissa Etheridge
2000	"The Promise"	Bruce Springsteen	Bruce Springsteen
2000	"Room at the Top"	Tom Petty	Tom Petty and the Heartbreakers
2000	"Special"	Duke Erikson, Shirley Manson, Steve Marker and Butch Vig	Garbage
2001
2001	"With Arms Wide Open"	Scott Stapp and Mark Tremonti	Creed
2001	"Again"	Lenny Kravitz	Lenny Kravitz
2001	"Bent"	Rob Thomas	Matchbox Twenty
2001	"Californication"	Flea, John Frusciante, Anthony Kiedis and Chad Smith	Red Hot Chili Peppers
2001	"Kryptonite"	Brad Arnold, Todd Harrell and Matt Roberts	3 Doors Down
2002
2002	"Drops of Jupiter (Tell Me)"	Charlie Colin, Rob Hotchkiss, Pat Monahan, Jimmy Stafford and Scott Underwood	Train
2002	"Elevation"	Bono, Adam Clayton, The Edge and Larry Mullen Jr.	U2
2002	"Jaded"	Marti Frederiksen and Steven Tyler	Aerosmith
2002	"Walk On"	Bono, Adam Clayton, The Edge and Larry Mullen Jr.	U2
2002	"Yellow"	Guy Berryman, Jonny Buckland, Will Champion and Chris Martin	Coldplay
2003
2003	"The Rising"	Bruce Springsteen	Bruce Springsteen
2003	"All My Life"	Dave Grohl, Taylor Hawkins, Nate Mendel and Chris Shiflett	Foo Fighters
2003	"Hero"	Chad Kroeger	Chad Kroeger featuring Josey Scott
2003	"I Stand Alone"	Sully Erna	Godsmack
2003	"When I'm Gone"	Brad Arnold, Todd Harrell, Chris Henderson and Matt Roberts	3 Doors Down
2004
2004	"Seven Nation Army"	Jack White	The White Stripes
2004	"Bring Me to Life"	David Hodges, Amy Lee and Ben Moody	Evanescence
2004	"Calling All Angels"	Charlie Colin, Patrick Monahan, Jimmy Stafford and Scott Underwood	Train
2004	"Disorder in the House"	Jorge Calderón and Warren Zevon	Bruce Springsteen and Warren Zevon
2004	"Someday"	Chad Kroeger, Mike Kroeger, Ryan Peake and Ryan Vikedal	Nickelback
2005
2005	"Vertigo"	Bono, Adam Clayton, The Edge and Larry Mullen Jr.	U2
2005	"American Idiot"	Billie Joe Armstrong, Mike Dirnt and Tré Cool	Green Day
2005	"Fall to Pieces"	Duff, Dave Kushner, Slash, Matt Sorum and Scott Weiland	Velvet Revolver
2005	"Float On"	Isaac Brock, Dann Gallucci, Eric Judy and Benjamin Weikel	Modest Mouse
2005	"Somebody Told Me"	Brandon Flowers, Dave Keuning, Mark Stoermer and Ronnie Vannucci Jr.	The Killers
2006
2006	"City of Blinding Lights"	Bono, Adam Clayton, The Edge and Larry Mullen Jr.	U2
2006	"Best of You"	Dave Grohl, Taylor Hawkins, Nate Mendel and Chris Shiflett	Foo Fighters
2006	"Beverly Hills"	Rivers Cuomo	Weezer
2006	"Devils & Dust"	Bruce Springsteen	Bruce Springsteen
2006	"Speed of Sound"	Guy Berryman, Jonny Buckland, Will Champion and Chris Martin	Coldplay
2007
2007	"Dani California"	Flea, John Frusciante, Anthony Kiedis and Chad Smith	Red Hot Chili Peppers
2007	"Chasing Cars"	Nathan Connolly, Gary Lightbody, Jonny Quinn and Tom Simpson	Snow Patrol
2007	"Lookin' for a Leader"	Neil Young	Neil Young
2007	"Someday Baby"	Bob Dylan	Bob Dylan
2007	"When You Were Young"	Brandon Flowers, Dave Keuning, Mark Stoermer and Ronnie Vannucci Jr.	The Killers
2008
2008	"Radio Nowhere"	Bruce Springsteen	Bruce Springsteen
2008	"Come On"	Lucinda Williams	Lucinda Williams
2008	"Icky Thump"	Jack White	The White Stripes
2008	"It's Not Over"	Chris Daughtry, Gregg Wattenberg, Mark Wilkerson and Brett Young	Daughtry
2008	"The Pretender"	Dave Grohl, Taylor Hawkins, Nate Mendel and Chris Shiflett	Foo Fighters
2009
2009	"Girls in Their Summer Clothes"	Bruce Springsteen	Bruce Springsteen
2009	"House of Cards"	Colin Greenwood, Jonny Greenwood, Ed O'Brien, Phil Selway and Thom Yorke	Radiohead
2009	"I Will Possess Your Heart"	Ben Gibbard, Nick Harmer, Jason McGerr and Chris Walla	Death Cab for Cutie
2009	"Sex on Fire"	Caleb Followill, Jared Followill, Matthew Followill and Nathan Followill	Kings of Leon
2009	"Violet Hill"	Guy Berryman, Jonny Buckland, Will Champion and Chris Martin	Coldplay

=== 2010s ===
Year	Song	Songwriter(s)	Artist(s)
2010
2010	"Use Somebody"	Caleb Followill, Jared Followill, Matthew Followill and Nathan Followill	Kings of Leon
2010	"The Fixer"	Matt Cameron, Stone Gossard, Mike McCready and Eddie Vedder	Pearl Jam
2010	"I'll Go Crazy If I Don't Go Crazy Tonight"	Bono, Adam Clayton, The Edge and Larry Mullen Jr.	U2
2010	"21 Guns"	Billie Joe Armstrong, Mike Dirnt and Tré Cool	Green Day
2010	"Working on a Dream"	Bruce Springsteen	Bruce Springsteen
2011
2011	"Angry World"	Neil Young	Neil Young
2011	"Little Lion Man"	Ted Dwane, Ben Lovett, Marcus Mumford and Winston Marshall	Mumford & Sons
2011	"Radioactive"	Caleb Followill, Jared Followill, Matthew Followill and Nathan Followill	Kings of Leon
2011	"Resistance"	Matt Bellamy	Muse
2011	"Tighten Up"	Dan Auerbach and Patrick Carney	The Black Keys
2012
2012	"Walk"	Dave Grohl, Taylor Hawkins, Nate Mendel, Chris Shiflett and Pat Smear	Foo Fighters
2012	"The Cave"	Ted Dwane, Ben Lovett, Marcus Mumford and Winston Marshall	Mumford & Sons
2012	"Every Teardrop Is a Waterfall"	Guy Berryman, Jonny Buckland, Will Champion and Chris Martin	Coldplay
2012	"Down by the Water"	Colin Meloy	The Decemberists
2012	"Lotus Flower"	Colin Greenwood, Jonny Greenwood, Ed O'Brien, Phil Selway and Thom Yorke	Radiohead
2013
2013	"Lonely Boy"	Dan Auerbach, Brian Burton and Patrick Carney	The Black Keys
2013	"Freedom at 21"	Jack White	Jack White
2013	"I Will Wait"	Ted Dwane, Ben Lovett, Winston Marshall and Marcus Mumford	Mumford & Sons
2013	"Madness"	Matt Bellamy	Muse
2013	"We Take Care of Our Own"	Bruce Springsteen	Bruce Springsteen
2014
2014	"Cut Me Some Slack"	Dave Grohl, Paul McCartney, Krist Novoselic and Pat Smear	Paul McCartney and Nirvana
2014	"Ain't Messin 'Round"	Gary Clark Jr.	Gary Clark Jr.
2014	"Doom and Gloom"	Mick Jagger and Keith Richards	The Rolling Stones
2014	"God Is Dead?"	Geezer Butler, Tony Iommi and Ozzy Osbourne	Black Sabbath
2014	"Panic Station"	Matt Bellamy	Muse
2015
2015	"Ain't It Fun"	Hayley Williams and Taylor York	Paramore
2015	"Blue Moon"	Beck Hansen	Beck
2015	"Fever"	Dan Auerbach, Brian Burton and Patrick Carney	The Black Keys
2015	"Gimme Something Good"	Ryan Adams	Ryan Adams
2015	"Lazaretto"	Jack White	Jack White
2016
2016	"Don't Wanna Fight"	Zac Cockrell, Heath Fogg, Brittany Howard and Steve Johnson	Alabama Shakes
2016	"Ex's & Oh's"	Dave Bassett and Elle King	Elle King
2016	"Hold Back the River"	Iain Archer and James Bay	James Bay
2016	"Lydia"	Richard Meyer, Ryan Meyer and Johnny Stevens	Highly Suspect
2016	"What Kind of Man"	John Hill, Tom Hull and Florence Welch	Florence + the Machine
2017
2017	"Blackstar"	David Bowie	David Bowie
2017	"Burn the Witch"	Colin Greenwood, Jonny Greenwood, Ed O'Brien, Philip Selway and Thom Yorke	Radiohead
2017	"Hardwired"	James Hetfield and Lars Ulrich	Metallica
2017	"Heathens"	Tyler Joseph	Twenty One Pilots
2017	"My Name Is Human"	Richard Meyer, Ryan Meyer and Johnny Stevens	Highly Suspect
2018
2018	"Run"	Dave Grohl, Taylor Hawkins, Rami Jaffee, Nate Mendel, Chris Shiflett and Pat Smear	Foo Fighters
2018	"Atlas, Rise!"	James Hetfield and Lars Ulrich	Metallica
2018	"Blood in the Cut"	Kristine Flaherty and Justin Daly	K.Flay
2018	"Go to War"	Ben Anderson, Jonny Hawkins, Will Hoffman, Daniel Oliver, David Pramik and Mark Vollelunga	Nothing More
2018	"The Stage"	Zachary Baker, Brian Haner, Matthew Sanders, Jonathan Seward and Brooks Wackerman	Avenged Sevenfold
2019
2019	"Masseduction"	Jack Antonoff and Annie Clark	St. Vincent
2019	"Black Smoke Rising"	Jacob Thomas Kiszka, Joshua Michael Kiszka, Samuel Francis Kiszka and Daniel Robert Wagner	Greta Van Fleet
2019	"Jumpsuit"	Tyler Joseph	Twenty One Pilots
2019	"Mantra"	Jordan Fish, Matthew Kean, Lee Malia, Matthew Nicholls and Oliver Sykes	Bring Me the Horizon
2019	"Rats"	Tom Dalgety and A Ghoul Writer	Ghost

=== 2020s ===
Year	Song	Songwriter(s)	Artist(s)
2020
2020	"This Land"	Gary Clark Jr.	Gary Clark Jr.
2020	"Fear Inoculum"	Danny Carey, Justin Chancellor, Adam Jones and Maynard James Keenan	Tool
2020	"Give Yourself a Try"	George Daniel, Adam Hann, Matthew Healy and Ross MacDonald	The 1975
2020	"Harmony Hall"	Ezra Koenig	Vampire Weekend
2020	"History Repeats"	Brittany Howard	Brittany Howard
2021
2021	"Stay High"	Brittany Howard	Brittany Howard
2021	"Kyoto"	Phoebe Bridgers, Morgan Nagler and Marshall Vore	Phoebe Bridgers
2021	"Lost in Yesterday"	Kevin Parker	Tame Impala
2021	"Not"	Adrianne Lenker	Big Thief
2021	"Shameika"	Fiona Apple	Fiona Apple
2022
2022	"Waiting on a War"	Dave Grohl, Taylor Hawkins, Rami Jaffee, Nate Mendel, Chris Shiflett and Pat Smear	Foo Fighters
2022	"All My Favorite Songs"	Rivers Cuomo, Ashley Gorley, Ben Johnson and Ilsey Juber	Weezer
2022	"The Bandit"	Caleb Followill, Jared Followill, Matthew Followill and Nathan Followill	Kings of Leon
2022	"Distance"	Wolfgang Van Halen	Mammoth WVH
2022	"Find My Way"	Paul McCartney	Paul McCartney
2023
2023	"Broken Horses"	Brandi Carlile, Phil Hanseroth and Tim Hanseroth	Brandi Carlile
2023	"Black Summer"	Flea, John Frusciante, Anthony Kiedis and Chad Smith	Red Hot Chili Peppers
2023	"Blackout"	Brady Ebert, Daniel Fang, Franz Lyons, Pat McCrory and Brendan Yates	Turnstile
2023	"Harmonia's Dream"	Robbie Bennett and Adam Granduciel	The War On Drugs
2023	"Patient Number 9"	John Osbourne, Chad Smith, Ali Tamposi, Robert Trujillo and Andrew Wotman	Ozzy Osbourne featuring Jeff Beck
2024
2024	"Not Strong Enough"	Julien Baker, Phoebe Bridgers and Lucy Dacus	Boygenius
2024	"Angry"	Mick Jagger, Keith Richards and Andrew Watt	The Rolling Stones
2024	"Ballad of a Homeschooled Girl"	Dan Nigro and Olivia Rodrigo	Olivia Rodrigo
2024	"Emotion Sickness"	Dean Fertita, Joshua Homme, Michael Shuman, Jon Theodore and Troy Van Leeuwen	Queens of the Stone Age
2024	"Rescued"	Dave Grohl, Rami Jaffee, Nate Mendel, Chris Shiflett and Pat Smear	Foo Fighters
2025
2025	"Broken Man"	Annie Clark	St. Vincent
2025	"Beautiful People (Stay High)"	Dan Auerbach, Patrick Carney, Beck Hansen and Daniel Nakamura	The Black Keys
2025	"Dark Matter"	Jeff Ament, Matt Cameron, Stone Gossard, Mike McCready, Eddie Vedder and Andrew Watt	Pearl Jam
2025	"Dilemma"	Billie Joe Armstrong, Tré Cool and Mike Dirnt	Green Day
2025	"Gift Horse"	Jon Beavis, Mark Bowen, Adam Devonshire, Lee Kiernan and Joe Talbot	IDLES
2026
2026	"As Alive as You Need Me to Be"	Trent Reznor and Atticus Ross	Nine Inch Nails
2026	"Caramel"	Vessel and II	Sleep Token
2026	"Glum"	Daniel James and Hayley Williams	Hayley Williams
2026	"Never Enough"	Daniel Fang, Franz Lyons, Pat McCrory, Meg Mills and Brendan Yates	Turnstile
2026	"Zombie"	Dominic Harrison and Matt Schwartz	Yungblud
2027
2027	"In the Stars"	Mick Jagger and Keith Richards	The Rolling Stones
2027	"Lost Boys"	Phoebe Bridgers, Bo Burnham, Alex G, Christian Lee Hutson and Marshall Vore	Phoebe Bridgers
2027	"My Only Angel"	Joe Perry, Matt Schwartz, Steven Tyler and Dominic Harrison	Aerosmith and Yungblud
2027	"Streets of Minneapolis – Radio Mix"	Bruce Springsteen	Bruce Springsteen
2027	"Trinidad"	Max Bassin, Dominic DiGesu, Emily Green and Cameron Winter	Geese
2027	"What's Wrong with Me"	Daniel Nigro, Olivia Rodrigo and Sasha Sloan	Olivia Rodrigo and Robert Smith
2027	"Your Favorite Toy"	Foo Fighters	Foo Fighters

- ^{^[I]} The performing artist is only listed but does not receive the award.
- ^{^[II]} Showing the name of the songwriter(s), the nominated song and in parentheses the performer's name(s).

== Multiple wins ==
4 wins

- Dave Grohl
- Pat Smear
- Bruce Springsteen

3 wins

- Taylor Hawkins, Nate Mendel and Chris Shiflett

2 wins

- Bono, Adam Clayton, The Edge and Larry Mullen, Jr.
- Annie Clark
- Flea, John Frusciante, Anthony Kiedis and Chad Smith
- Rami Jaffee
- Alanis Morissette
- Brittany Howard

== Multiple nominations ==
10 nominations

- Bruce Springsteen

9 nominations

- Dave Grohl

8 nominations

- Nate Mendel and Chris Shiflett

6 nominations

- Bono
- Taylor Hawkins
- Pat Smear

5 nominations

- Adam Clayton, The Edge and Larry Mullen, Jr.
- Chad Smith

4 nominations

- Dan Auerbach and Patrick Carney
- Guy Berryman, Jonny Buckland, Will Champion and Chris Martin
- Flea, John Frusciante and Anthony Kiedis
- Caleb Followill, Jared Followill, Matthew Followill and Nathan Followill
- Rami Jaffee
- Steven Tyler
- Jack White

3 nominations

- Billie Joe Armstrong, Mike Dirnt and Tré Cool
- Matt Bellamy
- Phoebe Bridgers
- Ted Dwane, Ben Lovett, Marcus Mumford and Winston Marshall
- Jakob Dylan
- Melissa Etheridge
- Colin Greenwood, Jonny Greenwood, Ed O'Brien, Phil Selway and Thom Yorke
- James Hetfield and Lars Ulrich
- Brittany Howard
- Mick Jagger and Keith Richards
- Joe Perry
- Eddie Vedder
- Neil Young

2 nominations

- Jeff Ament
- Fiona Apple
- Brad Arnold, Todd Harrell and Chris Henderson
- Brian Burton
- Matt Cameron, Stone Gossard and Mike McCready
- Annie Clark
- Gary Clark Jr.
- Kurt Cobain
- Charlie Colin, Patrick Monahan, Jimmy Stafford and Scott Underwood
- Rivers Cuomo
- Bob Dylan
- Duke Erikson, Shirley Manson, Steve Marker and Butch Vig
- Daniel Fang, Franz Lyons, Pat McCrory and Brendan Yates
- Brandon Flowers, Dave Keuning, Mark Stoermer and Ronnie Vannucci Jr.
- Beck Hansen
- Dominic Harrison
- John Hiatt
- Tyler Joseph
- Lenny Kravitz
- Chad Kroeger
- Dave Matthews
- Paul McCartney
- Richard Meyer, Ryan Meyer and Johnny Stevens
- Alanis Morissette
- Daniel Nigro and Olivia Rodrigo
- Ozzy Osbourne
- Tom Petty
- Trent Reznor
- Matt Schwartz
- Andrew Watt
- Marshall Vore

== See also ==
- List of Grammy Award categories
- Rock and Roll Hall of Fame
- Rock Songs
