= List of So You Think You Can Dance finalists =

This is a list of contestants who have appeared on the American television program So You Think You Can Dance and progressed to the live performance show stage of the competition.

== Contestants ==
Key
Male	Female	Winner	Runner-Up	Left Due to Injury

Contestant	Age	Home Town	Dance Style	Elimination Date	Finish	Season
Dmitry Chaplin	23	Rostov-on-Don, Russia	Latin Ballroom	July 20, 2006	9th/10th	Season 2
Rudy Abreu	19	Miami, Florida	Contemporary	August 13, 2014	7th/8th	Season 11
Alexie Agdeppa	26	Los Angeles, California	Jazz	June 17, 2010	11th	Season 7
Megan "Megz" Alfonso	29	Long Island, New York	Hip-Hop	August 31, 2015	5th/6th	Season 12
Joshua Allen†	18	Dallas, Texas	Hip-Hop	Winner	Winner	Season 4
Alexa Anderson	19	Chandler, Arizona	Contemporary	July 18, 2012	17th-20th	Season 9
Tahani Anderson	13	Victorville, California	Hip Hop	August 29, 2016	5th	Season 13
Jimmy Arguello	20	Miami, Florida	Contemporary/Lyrical	June 21, 2007	17th/18th	Season 3
Rayven Armijo	28	La Puente, California	Ballet	June 12, 2008	19th/20th	Season 4
Lindsay Arnold	18	Provo, Utah	Latin Ballroom	August 29, 2012	7th/8th	Season 9
Casey Askew	19	Seattle, Washington	Contemporary	August 20, 2014	5th/6th	Season 11
Phillip Attmore	25	Pasadena, California	Tap	November 3, 2009	17th/18th	Season 6
Daniela Avanzini	11	Atlanta, Georgia	Ballroom	July 18, 2016	10th	Season 13
Kupono Aweau	23	Kailua, Hawaii	Contemporary	July 16, 2009	9th/10th	Season 5
Daniel Baker	24	Newcastle, Australia	Ballet	July 18, 2012	17th-20th	Season 9
Kamilah Barrett	27	Seattle, Washington	Hip-Hop/Jazz	September 21, 2005	5th/6th	Season 1
Jamie Bayard	22	Palm Springs, California	Latin Ballroom	June 12, 2008	19th/20th	Season 4
Billy Bell	20	West Palm Beach, Florida	Contemporary Ballet	July 29, 2010	5th/6th	Season 7
Tony Bellissimo	20	Buffalo, New York	Hip-Hop	June 11, 2009	19th/20th	Season 5
Tanisha Belnap	20	Payson, Utah	Ballroom	August 13, 2014	7th/8th	Season 11
Alan Bersten	19	Minnetonka, Minnesota	Ballroom	August 6, 2013	11th/12th	Season 10
Kameron Bink	20	Coral Springs, Florida	Hip-Hop/Contemporary	July 26, 2007	9th/10th	Season 3
Carly Blaney	20	Wyckoff, New Jersey	Contemporary	July 30, 2014	11th-14th	Season 11
Nick Bloxsom-Carter	20	Oak Park, California	Ballroom	July 18, 2012	17th-20th	Season 9
Stephen "Twitch" Boss†	25	Montgomery, Alabama	Hip-Hop	Runner-Up	Runner-Up	Season 4
Kent Boyd	18	Wapakoneta, Ohio	Contemporary	Runner-Up	Runner-Up	Season 7
Michelle Brooke	27	Brooklyn, New York	Hip-Hop/Jazz	August 24, 2005	13th/14th	Season 1
Brandon Bryant	20	Miami, Florida	Contemporary	Runner-Up	Runner-Up	Season 5
Leon "Kida" Burns	14	Sacramento, California	Hip-Hop	Winner	Winner	Season 13
Witney Carson	18	American Fork, Utah	Latin Ballroom	September 9, 2012	5th/6th	Season 9
Jordan Casanova	19	Chino Hills, California	Jazz	July 28, 2011	7th/8th	Season 8
Audrey Case	18	Edmond, Oklahoma	Jazz	August 22, 2012	9th/10th	Season 9
Ruby Castro	12	Miami, Florida	Ballroom	August 22, 2016	6th	Season 13
Phillip Chbeeb	20	Houston, Texas	Popping	July 9, 2009	11th/12th	Season 5
Brittany Cherry	19	Pleasant Grove, Utah	Latin Ballroom	July 2, 2013	19th-20th	Season 10
Artem Chigvinsev	22	Menlo Park, California	Latin Ballroom	September 14, 2005	7th/8th	Season 1
J.T Church	10	Haymarket, Virginia	Jazz	Runner-up	2nd	Season 13
Teddy Coffey	19	Rochester, New York	Hip-Hop	July 30, 2014	11th-14th	Season 11
Sandra Colton	27	Las Vegas, Nevada	Tap	August 17, 2005	15th/16th	Season 1
Ryan Conferido	22	Downey, California	Breakdance	September 7, 2005	9th/10th	Season 1
Channing Cooke	18	Haverhill, Massachusetts	Contemporary	November 18, 2009	13th/14th	Season 6
Musa Cooper	28	Camden, New Jersey	Hip-Hop	July 13, 2006	11th/12th	Season 2
Ariana Crowder	22	Somerset, New Jersey	Hip-Hop	August 10, 2015	11th-14th	Season 12
Marquis Cunningham	18	Cape Coral, Florida	Contemporary	June 20, 2008	17th/18th	Season 4
Ashlé Dawson	21	Long Beach Island, New Jersey	Contemporary/Jazz/African	4th Place	4th	Season 1
Ariana DeBose	18	New Bern, North Carolina	Contemporary	October 27, 2009	19th/20th	Season 6
Craig DeRosa	18	Orem, Utah	Contemporary/Jazz	August 24, 2005	13th/14th	Season 1
Gaby Diaz	19	Miami, Florida	Tap	Winner	Winner	Season 12
Ashleigh Di Lello	26	Orem, Utah	Latin Ballroom	5th Place	5th	Season 6
Ryan Di Lello	28	Orem, Utah	Latin Ballroom	6th Place	6th	Season 6
Matt Dorame	24	Glendale, Arizona	Contemporary	July 3, 2008	13th/14th	Season 4
Emilio Dosal	23	Houston, Texas	Popping	August 6, 2014	9th/10th	Season 11
Brandon Dumlao	21	Concord, California	Hip-Hop	October 27, 2009	19th/20th	Season 6
Makenzie Dustman	18	Temecula, California	Contemporary	August 13, 2013	9th/10th	Season 10
Erin Ellis	19	Nashville, Tennessee	Jazz	June 15, 2006	19th/20th	Season 2
Jourdan Epstein	24	Plymouth, Minnesota	Ballet	July 16, 2014	17th/18th	Season 11
Hayley Erbert	18	Topeka, Kansas	Contemporary	August 27, 2013	5th/6th	Season 10
Eddie "Neptune" Eskridge	25	Dallas, Texas	Freestyle	August 24, 2015	7th/8th	Season 12
Randi Evans	23	Orem, Utah	Contemporary	July 16, 2009	9th/10th	Season 5
Zack Everhart	20	Kennesaw, Georgia	Tap	4th Place	4th	Season 11
Comfort Fedoke	19	Fort Worth, Texas	Hip-Hop	July 10, 2008; Re-entered competition (July 16, 2008); July 24, 2008	7th/8th	Season 4
Russell Ferguson	20	Boston, Massachusetts	Krump	Winner	Winner	Season 6
Jessica Fernandez	19	Margate, Florida	Ballet	July 6, 2006	13th/14th	Season 2
Alexander Fost	21	Alhambra, California	Ballet	July 14, 2011	11th/12th	Season 8
Darion Flores	19	Hartford, Connecticut	Ballet	July 20, 2015	19th/20th	Season 12
Natalie Fotopoulos	22	Tampa, Florida	Jazz	August 3, 2006	5th/6th	Season 2
Janaya French	20	Aurora, Colorado	Lyrical Contemporary	July 18, 2012	17th-20th	Season 9
Allan Frias	30	San Francisco, California	Hip-Hop	August 31, 2005	11th/12th	Season 1
Lauren Froderman	18	Phoenix, Arizona	Contemporary	Winner	Winner	Season 7
Brooklyn Fullmer	18	Provo, Utah	Latin Ballroom	July 23, 2014	15th/16th	Season 11
Sheaden Gabriel	12	Murrieta, California	Hip-Hop	9th Place	9th	Season 13
Tadd Gadduang	25	West Valley City, Utah	Breakdance	4th Place	4th	Season 8
Virgil "Lil O" Gadson	28	Philadelphia, Pennsylvania	Hip Hop	Street Runner-Up	3rd/4th	Season 12
Courtney Galiano	19	Commack, New York	Contemporary	4th Place	4th	Season 4
Ashley Galvan	20	Visalia, California	Lyrical	Left Due to Injury	7th	Season 7
Karla Garcia	23	Brooklyn, New York	Contemporary	July 2, 2009	13th/14th	Season 5
Nick Garcia	18	Miami, Florida	Latin Ballroom	July 9, 2014	19th/20th	Season 11
Susie Garcia	24	Miami, Florida	Salsa	June 20, 2008	17th/18th	Season 4
Cedric Gardner	22	Milwaukee, Wisconsin	Freestyle	July 12, 2007	13th/14th	Season 3
Carlos Garland	24	Jacksonville, Florida	Contemporary	July 2, 2013	19th-20th	Season 10
Anya Garnis	25	New York City, New York	Latin Ballroom	July 19, 2007	11th/12th	Season 3
Marko Germar	22	Dededo, Guam	Jazz	3rd Place	3rd	Season 8
Eliana Girard	21	West Palm Beach, Florida	Contemporary Ballet	Winner	Winner	Season 9
Jason Glover	21	Fresno, California	Contemporary	July 23, 2009	7th/8th	Season 5
Stanley Glover	19	Chicago, Illinois	Contemporary	July 16, 2014	17th/18th	Season 11
Jaimie Goodwin	19	Virginia Beach, Virginia	Contemporary	July 26, 2007	9th/10th	Season 3
Asaf Goren	23	Tel Aviv, Israel	Breakdance	August 5, 2015	15th/16th	Season 12
Lauren Gottlieb	18	Scottsdale, Arizona	Contemporary	August 13, 2007	5th/6th	Season 3
Mollee Gray	18	Orem, Utah	Jazz	December 9, 2009	7th/8th	Season 6
Nico Greetham	18	Woodbridge, Virginia	Contemporary	August 13, 2013	9th/10th	Season 10
Heidi Groskreutz	24	Cliffside Park, New Jersey	Swing/Latin Ballroom	4th Place	4th	Season 2
Jasmine Harper	20	Rochester, New York	Contemporary	Runner-Up	Runner-Up	Season 10
Neil Haskell	20	Clarence Center, New York	Contemporary	3rd Place	3rd	Season 3
Karen Hauer	27	Valencia, Venezuela	Latin Ballroom	November 25, 2009	11th/12th	Season 6
Dorian "Bluprint" Hector	20	Atlanta, Georgia	Animation	July 23, 2013	15th-16th	Season 10
Emma Hellenkamp	11	San Diego, California	Tap	Runner-up	4th	Season 13
Chelsie Hightower	19	Orem, Utah	Latin Ballroom	July 31, 2008	5th/6th	Season 4
Marcquet Hill	18	South Jordan, Utah	Latin Ballroom	July 23, 2014	15th/16th	Season 11
Allison Holker	18	Orem, Utah	Contemporary Jazz	July 27, 2006	7th/8th	Season 2
Curtis Holland	19	Miami, Florida	Tap	July 30, 2013	13th-14th	Season 10
Cole Horibe	26	Honolulu, Hawaii	Martial Arts Fusion	September 9, 2012	5th/6th	Season 9
Kevin Hunte	23	Brooklyn, New York	Hip-Hop	November 18, 2009	13th/14th	Season 6
Janelle Issis	24	Vestavia Hills, Alabama	Belly Dancing	August 15, 2012	11th-14th	Season 9
Amber Jackson	21	Atlanta, Georgia	Contemporary	July 25, 2012	15th/16th	Season 9
Ricky Jaime	19	Miami, Florida	Contemporary	August 4, 2011	5th/6th	Season 8
Emily James	22	North Kingstown, Rhode Island	Contemporary	July 30, 2014	11th-14th	Season 11
Chris Jarosz	22	Gaithersburg, Maryland	Contemporary	June 26, 2008	15th/16th	Season 4
Thayne Jasperson	27	Provo, Utah	Contemporary	July 10, 2008	12th	Season 4
Vitolio Jeune	26	Miami, Florida	Contemporary	July 2, 2009	13th/14th	Season 5
Jenna Johnson	19	Provo, Utah	Ballroom	August 20, 2013	7th/8th	Season 10
Sabra Johnson	19	Roy, Utah	Contemporary	Winner	Winner	Season 3
Donyelle Jones†	27	Los Angeles, California	Hip-Hop/Jazz	3rd Place	3rd	Season 2
Wadi Jones	24	Ossining, New York	Breakdance	June 23, 2011	17th-20th	Season 8
Alexis Juliano	19	Coral Springs, Florida	Tap	July 30, 2013	13th-14th	Season 10
Mark Kanemura	24	Honolulu, Hawaii	Jazz/Contemporary	July 31, 2008	5th/6th	Season 4
Maksim "Max" Kapitannikov	26	Brooklyn, New York	Latin Ballroom	June 18, 2009	17th/18th	Season 5
Paul Karmiryan	21	Los Angeles, California	Latin Ballroom	August 27, 2013	5th/6th	Season 10
Jakob Karr	19	Windermere, Florida	Contemporary	Runner-Up	Runner-Up	Season 6
Evan Kasprzak	21	West Bloomfield, Michigan	Broadway	3rd Place	3rd	Season 5
Matthew Kazmierczak	21	Peoria, Arizona	Contemporary	August 15, 2012	11th-14th	Season 9
Mitchell Kelly	20	Atlanta, Georgia	Contemporary	July 21, 2011	9th/10th	Season 8
Jessica King	24	Myrtle Beach, South Carolina	Contemporary	Left Due to Injury	11th	Season 4
Caitlin Kinney	21	Annapolis, Maryland	Acro–Ballet	July 9, 2009	11th/12th	Season 5
Tucker Knox	23	Nashville, Tennessee	Contemporary	August 20, 2013	7th/8th	Season 10
Chris Koehl	21	Garland, Texas	Hip-Hop	July 7, 2011	13th/14th	Season 8
Asuka Kondoh	25	San Francisco, California	Latin Ballroom	June 25, 2009	15th/16th	Season 5
Hokuto Konishi	22	Tokyo, Japan	Hip-Hop/Breakdance	July 19, 2007	11th/12th	Season 3
Ivan Koumaev	18	Seattle, Washington	Breakdance	August 3, 2006	5th/6th	Season 2
Pasha Kovalev	27	Fort Lee, New Jersey	Latin Ballroom	August 13, 2007	5th/6th	Season 3
Dareian Kujawa	20	Saint Paul, Minnesota	Contemporary	August 15, 2012	11th-14th	Season 9
Melody Lacayanga	22	Los Angeles, California	Contemporary/Jazz	Runner-Up	Runner-Up	Season 1
Ashlee Langas	19	Tyler, Texas	Contemporary	June 14, 2007	19th/20th	Season 3
George Lawrence, Jr.	19	Atlanta, Georgia	Contemporary	August 22, 2012	9th/10th	Season 9
Caitlynn Lawson	18	Moses Lake, Washington	Jazz/Contemporary	August 4, 2011	5th/6th	Season 8
Nick Lazzarini	21	Sunnyvale, California	Contemporary/Jazz	Winner	Winner	Season 1
Jess LeProtto	18	Little Falls, New Jersey	Broadway	July 28, 2011	7th/8th	Season 8
Jacque LeWarne	18	Clive, Iowa	Ballet	August 20, 2014	5th/6th	Season 11
Kourtni Lind	18	Forest Lake, Minnesota	Contemporary	July 3, 2008	13th/14th	Season 4
Amelia Lowe	18	Butler, New Jersey	Contemporary	August 15, 2012	11th-14th	Season 9
Iveta Lukosiute	30	Klaipėda, Lithuania	Ballroom	June 23, 2011	17th-20th	Season 8
Tiffany Maher	19	Plantation, Florida	Jazz	Runner-Up	Runner-Up	Season 9
Miranda Maleski	18	Pittsburgh, Pennsylvania	Contemporary	June 30, 2011	15th/16th	Season 8
Sasha Mallory	23	Bakersfield, California	Jazz/Modern/Hip-Hop	Runner-Up	Runner-Up	Season 8
Gev Manoukian	22	Salt Lake City, Utah	Breakdance	July 17, 2008	9th/10th	Season 4
Janette Manrara	25	Miami, Florida	Salsa	July 23, 3009	7th/8th	Season 5
Noelle Marsh	18	Sanford, North Carolina	Contemporary	December 2, 2009	9th/10th	Season 6
Jasmine Mason	19	Placentia, California	Jazz	July 9, 2013	17th-18th	Season 10
Jeanine Mason	18	Miami, Florida	Contemporary	Winner	Winner	Season 5
Pauline Mata	21	West Covina, California	Jazz	November 11, 2009	15th/16th	Season 6
Kathryn McCormick	19	Augusta, Georgia	Contemporary	3rd Place	3rd	Season 6
Jamile McGee	21	Columbus, Ohio	Hip-Hop/Popping	3rd Place	3rd	Season 1
Blake McGrath	21	Toronto, Ontario	Contemporary/Jazz	September 21, 2005	5th/6th	Season 1
Tate McRae	13	Calgary, Alberta, Canada	Contemporary/Ballet	Runner-up	3rd	Season 13
Malece Miller	19	Salt Lake City, Utah	Contemporary	August 6, 2013	11th/12th	Season 10
Brandon Mitchell	27	Kansas City, Kansas	Stepping	July 25, 2012	15th/16th	Season 9
Jake Monreal	12	Miami, Florida	Ballroom	August 1, 2016	7th	Season 13
Melanie Moore	19	Marietta, Georgia	Contemporary	Winner	Winner	Season 8
Missy Morelli	20	Arvada, Colorado	Jazz	June 23, 2011	17th-20th	Season 8
Jordan Nata'e Wandick	14	Bakersfield, California	Contemporary/Jazz	August 1, 2016	7th	Season 13
Martha Nichols	19	Brooklyn, New York	Contemporary/Hip-Hop	July 20, 2006	9th/10th	Season 2
Ashlee Nino	21	Fort Worth, Texas	Hip-Hop	July 13, 2006	11th/12th	Season 2
Shauna Noland	18	Santa Cruz, California	Contemporary	July 12, 2007	13th/14th	Season 3
Jim Nowakowski	26	Rochester, New York	Ballet	August 31, 2015	5th/6th	Season 12
Ade Obayomi	20	Chandler, Arizona	Contemporary	July 30, 2009	5th/6th	Season 5
Serge Onik †	26	Upper Saddle River, New Jersey	Latin Ballroom	July 30, 2014	11th-14th	Season 11
Clarice Ordaz	19	Whittier, California	Jazz	July 21, 2011	9th/10th	Season 8
Malene Ostergaard	25	Aarhus, Denmark	Latin Ballroom	July 9, 2014	19th/20th	Season 11
Ricky Palomino	25	Phoenix, Arizona	Contemporary	June 14, 2007	19th/20th	Season 3
Kherington Payne	18	Placentia, California	Contemporary	July 17, 2008	9th/10th	Season 4
Jessi Peralta	25	Cocoa, Florida	Contemporary/Hip-Hop	June 28, 2007	15th/16th	Season 3
Jonathan "Legacy" Perez	28	Miami, Florida	Breakdance	December 9, 2009	7th/8th	Season 6
Jonathan Platero	21	Sanford, Florida	Salsa	June 25, 2009	15th/16th	Season 5
Kayla Radomski	18	Aurora, Colorado	Contemporary	4th Place	4th	Season 5
Ryan Ramirez	19	Morgan Hill, California	Contemporary	July 14, 2011	11th/12th	Season 8
Ryan Rankine	20	Brooklyn, New York	Ballet/Contemporary	July 27, 2006	7th/8th	Season 2
Bianca Revels	20	Detroit, Michigan	Tap	November 3, 2009	17th/18th	Season 6
Ashley Rich	22	Antioch, California	Contemporary	July 7, 2011	13th/14th	Season 8
Jessica Richens	18	Yorba Linda, California	Jazz	3rd Place	3rd	Season 11
Valerie Rockey	20	Indianapolis, Indiana	Tap	Runner-Up	Runner-Up	Season 11
Destini Rogers	22	Oklahoma City, Oklahoma	Contemporary/Jazz	September 7, 2005	9th/10th	Season 1
Robert Roldan	19	Thousand Oaks, California	Jazz	3rd Place	3rd	Season 7
Jose "Full Deck" Ruiz	21	Pembroke Pines, Florida	Breaking	July 29, 2010	5th/6th	Season 7
Peter Sabasino	22	Philadelphia, Pennsylvania	Tap	November 11, 2009	15th/16th	Season 6
Dominic Sandoval	21	Sacramento, California	Breakdance	August 2, 2007	7th/8th	Season 3
Melissa Sandvig	29	Los Alamitos, California	Ballet	July 30, 2009	5th/6th	Season 5
Cristina Santana	24	San Diego, California	Salsa	June 24, 2010	10th	Season 7
Faina Savich	21	Vitebsk, Belarus	Latin Ballroom	June 21, 2007	17th/18th	Season 3
Stanislav Savich	22	Brooklyn, New York	Ballroom	June 15, 2006	19th/20th	Season 2
Benji Schwimmer	22	Moreno Valley, California	Swing/Latin Ballroom	Winner	Winner	Season 2
Lacey Schwimmer	18	Redlands, California	Latin Ballroom	4th Place	4th	Season 3
Ellenore Scott	19	Santa Cruz, California	Jazz	4th Place	4th	Season 6
Katee Shean	19	San Jose, California	Contemporary	3rd Place	3rd	Season 4
Victor Smalley	21	Miami, Florida	Contemporary	November 25, 2009	11th/12th	Season 6
Jesús Solorio	23	Paso Robles, California	Contemporary	June 28, 2007	15th/16th	Season 3
Joy Spears	19	Killen, Alabama	Jazz/Hip-Hop	June 22, 2006	17th/18th	Season 2
Mariah Spears	19	Chandler, Arizona	Hip-Hop	July 23, 2013	15th-16th	Season 10
Cyrus "Glitch" Spencer	22	Atlanta, Georgia	Popping/Animating	Runner-Up	Runner-Up	Season 9
Du-Shaunt "Fik-Shun" Stegall	18	Las Vegas, Nevada	Hip-Hop	Winner	Winner	Season 10
Melinda Sullivan	22	Thousand Oaks, California	Tap	July 1, 2010	9th	Season 7
Ben Susak	19	Phoenix, Arizona	Contemporary	June 29, 2006	15th/16th	Season 2
Jonathan "Jonnis" Tannis	20	Burnaby, British Columbia	Hip-Hop	August 17, 2005	15th/16th	Season 1
Robert Taylor, Jr.	31	Brooklyn, New York	Hip-Hop	June 30, 2011	15th/16th	Season 8
Will Thomas	19	Troy, Michigan	Contemporary	August 29, 2012	7th/8th	Season 9
Danny Tidwell †	22	Norfolk, Virginia	Contemporary	Runner-Up	Runner-Up	Season 3
AdéChiké Torbert	23	Brooklyn, New York	Contemporary	4th Place	4th	Season 7
Paris Torres	19	Issaquah, Washington	Contemporary	June 11, 2009	19th/20th	Season 5
Chelsea Traille	23	Flower Mound, Texas	Contemporary	June 26, 2008	15th/16th	Season 4
Nathan Trasoras	18	Downey, California	Contemporary	December 2, 2009	9th/10th	Season 6
Jaymz Tuaileva	20	Orem, Utah	Jazz	July 6, 2006	13th/14th	Season 2
Aaron Turner	25	Las Vegas, Nevada	Tap	Runner-Up	Runner-Up	Season 10
Ricky Ubeda	18	Miami, Florida	Contemporary	Winner	Winner	Season 11
Snejana "Snow" Urbin	25	Siberia, Russia	Latin Ballroom	August 31, 2005	11th/12th	Season 1
Ashley Valerio	22	Mesa, Arizona	Contemporary	June 18, 2009	17th/18th	Season 5
Jaja Vankova	22	Van Nuys, California	Animation/Krump	Runner-Up	Runner-Up	Season 12
Melissa Vella	20	Springfield, Pennsylvania	Contemporary/Jazz	September 14, 2005	7th/8th	Season 1
Sara Von Gillern	20	Rock Island, Illinois	Breakdance	August 2, 2007	7th/8th	Season 3
Travis Wall	18	Virginia Beach, Virginia	Contemporary	Runner-Up	Runner-Up	Season 2
Chehon Wespi-Tschopp	23	Zurich, Switzerland	Ballet	Winner	Winner	Season 9
Bridget Whitman	20	Tempe, Arizona	Contemporary	August 6, 2014	9th/10th	Season 11
Jason Williams	20	Wilmington, North Carolina	Hip-Hop/Jazz/Funk	June 22, 2006	17th/18th	Season 2
William Wingfield	21	Nashville, Tennessee	Contemporary	July 24, 2008	7th/8th	Season 4
Aleksandra Wojda	23	Pretoria, South Africa	Contemporary	June 29, 2006	15th/16th	Season 2
Alex Wong	23	Vancouver, British Columbia	Ballet	Left Due to Injury	8th	Season 7
Amy Yakima	19	Northville, Michigan	Jazz	Winner	Winner	Season 10
Nick Young	19	Franklin, Wisconsin	Tap	June 23, 2011	17th-20th	Season 8
Jade Zuberi	21	Detroit, Michigan	Animation	Left Due to Injury	17th-18th	Season 10

== All-Stars Dance Pool ==
The "All-Stars" dance pool, introduced in season 7, is composed of notable past SYTYCD finalists who partner with new contestants for some of their routines. These non-competing dancers perform mainly in the genres that are their expertise and may perform only once or several times over the course of a season. With the exception of one season 10 episode, they do not choreograph these routines but rather learn them alongside their contestant partners. They have also occasionally been featured in non-competitive performances during results shows, reprising past well-received routines or new group dances; however, the table below references only duets performed with competing partners.

Number of Competitive Routines
Dancer	Season	Dance Styles	Season 7	Season 8	Season 9	Season 10	Season 11	Season 12
Melody Lacayanga	1	Contemporary/Jazz		1				
Nick Lazzarini	1	Contemporary			1		1	
Dmitry Chaplin	2	Ballroom/Latin				1		
Allison Holker	2	Jazz/Contemporary/Broadway/Cultural	8	2	3	1	1	
Ivan Koumaev	2	Hip-hop		1				
Benji Schwimmer	2	Swing			1			
Travis Wall	2	Contemporary				1		Captain
Anya Garnis	3	Ballroom/Latin	8	1	2		1	1
Dominic Sandoval	3	Hip-hop/Breakdancing	5					
Jaimie Goodwin	3	Contemporary/Jazz		1	1		1	2
Lauren Gottlieb	3	Hip-hop/Jazz/Contemporary	7	1	2			
Neil Haskell	3	Jazz/Contemporary/Broadway/Cultural	4	1		2		
Pasha Kovalev	3	Ballroom/Latin	7	4				
Chelsie Hightower	4	Ballroom/Latin		1		1		
Comfort Fedoke	4	Hip-hop/Krump	5	1	1	3	1	2
Mark Kanemura	4	Jazz/Broadway/Cultural	4	1		1		
Stephen "tWitch" Boss	4	Popping/Locking/Krump	5	2	4	3	3	Captain
Courtney Galiano	4	Contemporary/Jazz	8			1		
Joshua Allen	4	Hip-hop		1		1		3
William Wingfield	4	Contemporary			1		2	
Ade Obayomi	5	Contemporary/Classical	5	1	1		2	
Brandon Bryant	5	Contemporary/Jazz		1	1	1	1	1
Janette Manrara	5	Ballroom/Latin		1				
Kayla Radomski	5	Contemporary						2
Jacob Karr	6	Contemporary			1	1		
Kathryn McCormick	6	Jazz/Contemporary/Broadway/Cultural	9	1	2	2	2	
Ryan Di Lello	6	Ballroom			1		2	
Ellenore Scott	6	Jazz/Contemporary		1				
Lauren Froderman	7	Contemporary/Jazz		2			1	
Kent Boyd	7	Contemporary/Jazz		1				
Robert Roldan	7	Contemporary/Jazz		2		2	1	
Alex Wong	7	Ballet			3	1		2
Melinda Sullivan	7	Tap				1		
Melanie Moore	8	Contemporary			2	2		1
Marko Germar	8	Lyrical Jazz			1	1		3
Witney Carson	9	Ballroom/Latin				2		
Chehon Wespi-Tschopp	9	Ballet					1	
Cyrus "Glitch" Spencer	9	Animation						1
Makenzie Dustman	10	Contemporary					2	
Jasmine Harper	10	Contemporary/Hip-hop					1	2
Jenna Johnson	10	Ballroom/Latin					1	
Du-Shaunt "Fik-Shun" Stegall	10	Hip-hop					1	1
Amy Yakima	10	Jazz/Contemporary					1	
Aaron Turner	10	Tap					2	
Paul Karmiryan	10	Ballroom/Latin						1
Zack Everhart	11	Tap						1
Jessica Richens	11	Jazz						1
Ricky Ubeda	11	Contemporary						1

== See also ==
- List of dancers
