= Alex Da Silva (dancer) =

Salsa dance champion and choreographer

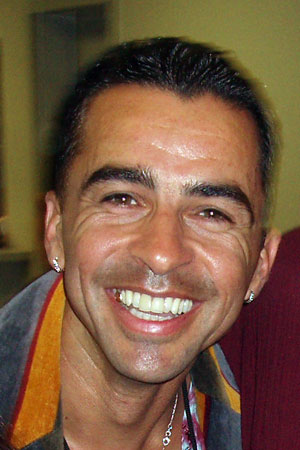
- Born: March 27, 1968 (age 58); Rio de Janeiro, Brazil
- Occupation: Choreographer

Alex Da Silva is a Brazilian dancer and choreographer, specializing in Salsa dancing. Da Silva is also known for being a recurring guest choreographer on the Fox TV show So You Think You Can Dance.

In 2009, Da Silva was arrested over allegations of rape, and in 2012 he was convicted and sentenced to 10 years in prison.

== Biography ==
Da Silva was born March 27, 1968, in Rio de Janeiro, Brazil. He discovered Salsa dancing at the age of 20. He is credited with contributing to the LA-style of salsa dancing. Da Silva started his career as a salsa dancer and instructor in the San Francisco Bay Area.

== SYTYCD choreography ==
Season	Show	Dancers	Style	Music
Season 1	Week 1	Michelle Brooke; Jonnis Tannis	Mambo	"Caravan"—Eddie Torres and His Mambo Kings
Season 1	Week 1	Melissa Vella; Ryan Conferido	Mambo	"Caravan"—Eddie Torres and His Mambo Kings
Season 1	Week 2	Melissa Vella; Ryan Conferido	Salsa	"Cubanjam"—Orquesta la Palabra
Season 1	Week 5	Kamilah Barrett; Nick Lazzarini	Mambo	"Mambo Cool"—Ernesto Marquez and his Orchestra
Season 1	Week 5	Ashlé Dawson; Artem Chigvintsev	Cha Cha	"El Sabroso Son"—La Palabra
Season 1	Week 6	Ashlé Dawson; Blake McGrath	Argentine tango	"Santa Maria"—Gotan Project
Season 1	Week 7	Ashlé Dawson; Jamile McGee	Salsa	"Oh Mayi"—La Sonora Poncena
Season 1	Week 8	Alex Da Silva; Lauren Sánchez	Guest performance	"Caravan"—Eddie Torres and His Mambo Kings
Season 2	Week 1	Allison Holker; Ivan Koumaev	Salsa	"El Tamblor"—La Palabra
Season 2	Week 1	Natalie Fotopoulos; Musa Cooper	Mambo	"Nina"—Joe Cuba Sextet
Season 2	Week 3	Heidi Groskreutz; Ryan Rankine	Cuban rumba	"Rumba del Solar"—Angelo Rodriguez
Season 2	Week 3	Allison Holker; Ivan Koumaev	Argentine tango	"Libertango"—bond
Season 2	Week 7	Allison Holker; Ivan Koumaev	Argentine tango	"La Cumparsita"—Orquestra Esquela de Tango
Season 2	Week 7	Heidi Groskreutz; Benji Schwimmer	Mambo	"Black Mambo"—Angel and the Mambokats
Season 2	Week 9	Heidi Groskreutz; Benji Schwimmer	Salsa	"La Comay"—Sonora Carruseles
Season 3	Week 1	Ashlee Langas; Ricky Palomino	Argentine tango	"Sentimiento Tango"—Trio Federico-Berlingieri
Season 3	Week 1	Lauren Gottlieb; Neil Haskell	Salsa	"Friday Night Rhythm"—Mazerati 5
Season 3	Week 4	Shauna Noland; Cedric Gardener	Mambo	"Flauta Y Timbal"—Tito Puente
Season 3	Week 7	Sara Von Gillern; Danny Tidwell	Argentine tango	"Whatever Lola Wants"—Sara Vaughan and Gotan Project
Season 4	Week 2	Chelsie Hightower; Mark Kanemura	Argentine tango	"Mi Confesión"—Gotan Project
Season 4	Week 2	Susie Garcia; Marquis Cunningham	Salsa	"Aguanilé"—Willie Colón and Héctor Lavoe
Season 4	Week 4	Kourtni Lind; Matt Dorame	Mambo	"Ban-Con-Tin"—Super-All-Star
Season 4	Week 5	Chelsie Hightower; Mark Kanemura	Salsa	"Fuego"—Joe Bataan

- Favourite routines:
  - Mambo with Benji Schwimmer and Heidi Groskreutz was chosen by Benji Schwimmer (winner) as his best performed routine season 2

== Rape charge and conviction ==
In 2009, Da Silva was charged with "four counts of forcible rape, two counts of assault with intent to commit rape and two counts of sexual penetration by a foreign object." Da Silva stated he was innocent and pleaded not guilty to all charges. He had stated in interviews that the sex was consensual and that the women were trying to extort money from him and they may have known each other as they came from the same small town.

Da Silva was arrested in August 2009, and unable to pay bail set at two million dollars, he remained in jail for two years as mistrials and delays prevented his case from reaching a conclusion.

On September 16, 2011, a downtown Los Angeles jury found Alex Da Silva, 43, guilty of raping a 22-year-old woman in August 2002 and assault with intent to commit rape involving another woman in March 2009.

On January 27, 2012, L.A. Superior Court Judge Kathleen Kennedy, defense attorney Carlos Valdez. Valdez and associates Santa Ana CA handed down a 10-year prison sentence in reference to the 2009 arrest.

Da Silva was released from prison on February 15, 2018. He was deported back to Brazil soon after.

== See also ==
- List of dancers
