= So You Think You Can Dance (American TV series) season 1 =

So You Think You Can Dance
- Season 1
- Hosted by: Lauren Sánchez
- Judges: Main judges: Nigel Lythgoe; Guest judges: Brian Friedman; Dan Karaty; Mia Michaels; Mary Murphy
- Winner: Nick Lazzarini
- Runner-up: Melody Lacayanga

Release
- Original network: Fox
- Original release: July 20 – October 5, 2005

Season chronology
- Next → Season 2

So You Think You Can Dance is an American television dance competition that airs on the Fox network. The first season premiered on July 20, 2005, with Lauren Sánchez in her only season as host, Nigel Lythgoe as the main judge, and Mary Murphy, Dan Karaty, Mia Michaels and Brian Friedman as most frequent guest judges. Nick Lazzarini was crowned America's Favorite Dancer on October 5, 2005, with 37.7% of the votes.

== Auditions ==
=== Locations ===
The main auditions for this season were held in following cities:

Audition Venue	City	Judges
Chicago Theatre	Chicago, Illinois	Nigel Lythgoe; Bonnie Lythgoe; Jeff Thacker
Manhattan Center Theatre	New York City, New York	Nigel Lythgoe; Bonnie Lythgoe; Jeff Thacker
Orpheum Theatre	Los Angeles, California	Nigel Lythgoe; Bonnie Lythgoe; Jeff Thacker

=== Format ===
Audition contestants had one minute to impress the judges. A contestant deemed to be not good enough was sent straight home, otherwise, they were sent to a choreography round. After that, the judges decided the fifty contestants that got through to the Hollywood week.

Minimum age for contestants was 18; maximum was 30.

== Hollywood week ==
Judges: Nigel Lythgoe, Mary Murphy, Dan Karaty, Mia Michaels, Brian Friedman, Alex Da Silva

Hollywood week was held in Hollywood in Los Angeles, California. 25 female contestants and 25 male contestants (each gender) were invited to participate in the callback auditions. This number was cut down to 8 female contestants and 8 male contestants, a total of 16 contestants (both gender) that came through to the live shows. Hollywood week included the following rounds, cuts were made at the end:

Task/style	Choreographer
Salsa	Alex Da Silva
Jazz	Brian Friedman
Hip-Hop	Dan Karaty
Contemporary	Mia Michaels
Foxtrot	Mary Murphy

== Studio Shows ==
=== Top 16 contestants ===
==== Female contestants ====
Contestant	Age	Home Town	Dance Style	Elimination date	Placement
Melody Lacayanga	22	Los Angeles, California	Contemporary / Jazz	Runner-up	Runner-up
Ashlé Dawson	21	Long Beach Island, New Jersey	Contemporary / Jazz / African	4th Place	4th Place
Kamilah Barrett	27	Seattle, Washington	Hip-Hop / Jazz	September 21, 2005	Top 6
Melissa Vella	20	Springfield, Pennsylvania	Contemporary / Jazz	September 14, 2005	Top 8
Destini Rogers	22	Oklahoma City, Oklahoma	Contemporary / Jazz	September 7, 2005	Top 10
Snejana "Snow" Urbin	25	Siberia, Russia	Latin Ballroom / Latin Jazz	August 31, 2005	Top 12
Michelle Brooke	27	Brooklyn, New York	Jazz	August 24, 2005	Top 14
Sandra Colton	27	Las Vegas, Nevada	Tap	August 17, 2005	Top 16

==== Male contestants ====
Contestant	Age	Home Town	Dance Style	Elimination date	Placement
Nick Lazzarini	20	Sunnyvale, California	Jazz	Winner	Winner
Jamile McGee	21	Columbus, Ohio	Hip-Hop / Popping	3rd Place	3rd Place
Blake McGrath	21	Mississauga, Ontario, Canada	Contemporary / Jazz	September 21, 2005	Top 6
Artem Chigvintsev	22	Menlo Park, California (originally from Russia)	Latin Ballroom	September 14, 2005	Top 8
Ryan Conferido	22	Downey, California	Breakdance	September 7, 2005	Top 10
Allan Frias	30	San Francisco, California	Hip-Hop	August 31, 2005	Top 12
Craig DeRosa	18	Mount Sinai, New York	Contemporary / Jazz	August 24, 2005	Top 14
Jonathan "Jonnis" Tannis	20	Burnaby, British Columbia, Canada	Hip-Hop	August 17, 2005	Top 16

Canadian-born McGrath has since become lead choreographer and occasional third judge for So You Think You Can Dance Canada ; he is choreographer for those contestants who are sent to choreography.

==== Elimination chart ====
Legend
Female	Male	Bottom 3 couples	Bottom 2 couples

Week:	8/17	8/24	8/31	9/7	9/14	9/21	10/5
Contestant	Results						
Nick Lazzarini		Btm 3					Winner
Melody Lacayanga		Btm 3	Btm 2	Btm 2			Runner-Up
Jamile McGee		Btm 3		Btm 2	Btm 2		3rd Place
Ashlé Dawson					Btm 2		4th Place
Blake McGrath						Elim	
Kamilah Barrett						Elim	
Artem Chigvintsev	Btm 3				Elim		
Melissa Vella					Elim		
Ryan Conferido			Btm 2	Elim			
Destini Rogers				Elim			
Allan Frias	Btm 3		Elim				
Snejana "Snow" Urbin	Btm 3	Btm 3	Elim				
Craig DeRosa		Elim					
Michelle Brooke	Btm 3	Elim					
Jonathan "Jonnis" Tannis	Elim						
Sandra Colton	Elim						

=== Performance nights ===
==== Week 1 (August 17, 2005) ====
Judges: Brian Friedman, Mia Michaels, Nigel Lythgoe and Dan Karaty

- Couple dances:

Couple	Style	Music	Choreographer(s)	Result
Kamilah Barrett; Nick Lazzarini	Hip-Hop	"Touch"—Omarion	Blake Anthony/Marty Kudelka	Safe
Michelle Brooke; Jonathan "Jonnis" Tannis	Mambo	"Caravan"—Eddie Torres and his Mambo Kings	Alex DaSilva	Jonathan "Jonnis" Tannis eliminated
Sandra Colton; Artem Chigvintsev	Lyrical	"Nora"—Blessid Union of Souls	Alex Magno	Sandra Colton eliminated
Ashlé Dawson; Jamile McGee	Jive	"Jim Dandy"—LaVern Baker	Mary Murphy	Safe
Snejana "Snow" Urbin; Allan Frias	Hip-Hop	"Touch"—Omarion	Blake Anthony/Marty Kudelka	Bottom 3
Melissa Vella; Ryan Conferido	Mambo	"Caravan"—Eddie Torres and his Mambo Kings	Alex DaSilva	Safe
Destini Rogers; Blake McGrath	Lyrical	"Nora"—Blessid Union of Souls	Alex Magno	Safe
Melody Lacayanga; Craig DeRosa	Jive	"Jim Dandy"—LaVern Baker	Mary Murphy	Safe

- Bottom 3 contestant's solos:

Contestant	Style	Music	Result
Michelle Brooke	Hip-Hop	"Dum Diddly"—The Black Eyed Peas	Safe
Jonathan "Jonnis" Tannis	Hip-Hop	"Bebot"—The Black Eyed Peas	Eliminated
Sandra Colton	Tap	"Hollaback Girl"—Gwen Stefani	Eliminated
Artem Chigvintsev	Rumba	"Let Me Love You"—Mario	Safe
Snejana "Snow" Urbin	Samba	"Din Daa Daa"—George Kranz	Safe
Allan Frias	Lyrical Hip-Hop	"Take You Out"—Luther Vandross	Safe

- Eliminated:
  - Sandra Colton
  - Jonathan "Jonnis" Tannis

==== Week 2 (August 24, 2005) ====
Judges: Nigel Lythgoe, Mary Murphy, Dan Karaty and Brian Friedman

- Couple dances:

Couple	Style	Music	Choreographer(s)	Result
Snejana "Snow" Urbin; Jamile McGee	Quickstep	"It Don't Mean a Thing (If it Ain't Got That Swing)"—Geoff Love and his Orchestra	Glenn Weiss	Bottom 3
Destini Rogers; Blake McGrath	Lyrical Jazz	"A Song for You"—Donny Hathaway	Mia Michaels	Safe
Melody Lacayanga; Craig DeRosa	Hip-Hop	"Tipsy"—J-Kwon	Shane Sparks	Craig DeRosa eliminated
Michelle Brooke; Nick Lazzarini	Quickstep	"It Don't Mean a Thing (If it Ain't Got That Swing)"—Geoff Love and his Orchestra	Glenn Weiss	Michelle Brooke eliminated
Ashlé Dawson; Artem Chigvintsev	Lyrical Jazz	"A Song for You"—Donny Hathaway	Mia Michaels	Safe
Kamilah Barrett; Allan Frias	Hip-Hop	"Tipsy"—J-Kwon	Shane Sparks	Safe
Melissa Vella; Ryan Conferido	Salsa	"Cubanjam"—Orquesta la Palabra	Alex Da Silva	Safe

- Bottom 3 contestant's solos:

Contestant	Style	Music	Result
Snejana "Snow" Urbin	Cha-Cha	"And She Said"—Lucas Prata	Safe
Jamile McGee	Popping	"I Can Make You Dance"—Zapp	Safe
Melody Lacayanga	Jazz	"You Can Leave Your Hat On"—Etta James	Safe
Craig DeRosa	Contemporary	"Everything"—Lifehouse	Eliminated
Michelle Brooke	Hip-Hop	"Disco Club"—The Black Eyed Peas	Eliminated
Nick Lazzarini	Contemporary	"Storm"—Lifehouse	Safe

- Eliminated:
  - Michelle Brooke
  - Craig DeRosa

==== Week 3 (August 31, 2005) ====
Judges: Mia Michaels, Brian Friedman, Mary Murphy and Nigel Lythgoe

- Couple dances:

Couple	Style	Music	Choreographer(s)	Result
Ashlé Dawson; Blake McGrath	Rock'n'Roll	"Hound Dog"—Elvis Presley	Travis Payne	Safe
Melissa Vella; Artem Chigvintsev	Paso Doble	"España cañí"—Boston Pops Orchestra	Ron Montez	Safe
Melody Lacayanga; Allan Frias	Lyrical	"Rocket Man"—Elton John	Keith Young	Allan Frias eliminated
Snejana "Snow" Urbin; Ryan Conferido	Hip-Hop	"Pon de Replay"—Rihanna	Dan Karaty	Snejana "Snow" Urbin eliminated
Destini Rogers; Jamile McGee	Viennese Waltz	"The Blue Danube"—Manhattan Pops Orchestra	Ron Montez	Safe
Kamilah Barrett; Nick Lazzarini	Disco	"You Make Me Feel (Mighty Real)"—Sylvester James	Doriana Sánchez	Safe

- Bottom 2 contestant's solos:

Contestant	Style	Music	Result
Melody Lacayanga	Contemporary	"Seduces Me"—Celine Dion	Safe
Allan Frias	Hip-Hop	"Feel the Girl"—Ms. Jade	Eliminated
Snejana "Snow" Urbin	Cha-Cha	"Ma Ya Hi"—Lucas Prata	Eliminated
Ryan Conferido	Breakdance	"Poison"—Bell Biv DeVoe	Safe

- Eliminated:
  - Snejana "Snow" Urbin
  - Allan Frias

==== Week 4 (September 7, 2005) ====
Judges: Brian Friedman, Mia Michaels, Nigel Lythgoe and Dan Karaty

- Couple dances:

Couple	Style	Music	Choreographer(s)	Result
Melissa Vella; Artem Chigvintsev	Pop	"Don't Cha"—The Pussycat Dolls	Doriana Sánchez	Safe
Melissa Vella; Artem Chigvintsev	Quickstep	"Big Swing Face"—Buddy Rich	Glenn Weiss	Safe
Kamilah Barrett; Nick Lazzarini	Tango	"Tanguedia"—Prandi Sound Dance Orchestra	Mary Murphy	Safe
Kamilah Barrett; Nick Lazzarini	Pop	"I Drove All Night"—Celine Dion	Doriana Sánchez	Safe
Melody Lacayanga; Ryan Conferido	Lyrical	"The First Time Ever I Saw Your Face"—Jeffrey Gaines	Tovaris Wilson	Ryan Conferido eliminated
Melody Lacayanga; Ryan Conferido	Foxtrot	"Is You Is or Is You Ain't My Baby"—Renee Olstead	Glenn Weiss	Ryan Conferido eliminated
Destini Rogers; Jamile McGee	Quickstep	"Sing, Sing, Sing"—Benny Goodman	Glenn Weiss	Destini Rogers eliminated
Destini Rogers; Jamile McGee	Hip-Hop	"Shake"—Ying Yang Twins feat. Pitbull	Shane Sparks	Destini Rogers eliminated
Ashlé Dawson; Blake McGrath	Samba	"Jazz Machine"—Black Machine	Mary Murphy	Safe
Ashlé Dawson; Blake McGrath	Lyrical	"Right Here Waiting"—Richard Marx	Tovaris Wilson	Safe

- Bottom 2 contestant's solos:

Contestant	Style	Music	Result
Melody Lacayanga	Jazz	"Giving Him Something He Can Feel"—En Vogue	Safe
Ryan Conferido	Breakdance	"Know the Ledge"—Erik B. & Rakim	Eliminated
Destini Rogers	Jazz	"Bring on the Men"—Linda Eder	Eliminated
Jamile McGee	Popping	"Give It to Me, Baby"—Rick James	Safe

- Eliminated:
  - Destini Rogers
  - Ryan Conferido

==== Week 5 (September 14, 2005) ====
Judges: Dan Karaty, Nigel Lythgoe, Mary Murphy and Brian Friedman

- Couple dances:

Couple	Style	Music	Choreographer(s)	Result
Kamilah Barrett; Nick Lazzarini	Mambo	"Mambo Cool"—Ernesto Marquez and his Orchestra	Alex Da Silva	Safe
Kamilah Barrett; Nick Lazzarini	Contemporary	"King of Pain"—The Police	Mia Michaels	Safe
Melody Lacayanga; Blake McGrath	Lyrical	"Heaven"—DJ Sammy & Yanou feat. Do	Tovaris Wilson	Safe
Melody Lacayanga; Blake McGrath	Disco	"You Should Be Dancing"—The Bee Gees	Doriana Sánchez	Safe
Ashlé Dawson; Artem Chigvintsev	Foxtrot	"Fever"—Michael Bublé	Heather Smith	Artem Chigvintsev eliminated
Ashlé Dawson; Artem Chigvintsev	Cha-Cha	"El Sabroso Son"—La Palabra	Alex Da Silva	Artem Chigvintsev eliminated
Melissa Vella; Jamile McGee	Hip-Hop	"Can't Stop, Won't Stop"—Young Gunz feat. Chingy	Shane Sparks	Melissa Vella eliminated
Melissa Vella; Jamile McGee	Paso Doble	"Spanish Gipsy Dance"—Tony Evans	Mark Weiss	Melissa Vella eliminated

- Bottom 2 contestant's solos:

Contestant	Style	Music	Result
Ashlé Dawson	African Jazz	"La Corrida"—De La Guarda	Safe
Artem Chigvintsev	Cha-Cha	"Don't Phunk with My Heart"—The Black Eyed Peas	Eliminated
Melissa Vella	Contemporary	"Gone"—Kelly Clarkson	Eliminated
Jamile McGee	Popping	"You Dropped a Bomb on Me"—The Gap Band	Safe

- Eliminated:
  - Melisa Vella
  - Artem Chigvintsev

==== Week 6 (September 21, 2005) ====
Judges: Mia Michaels, Nigel Lythgoe, Mary Murphy and Dan Karaty

- Couple dances:

Couple	Style	Music	Choreographer(s)	Result
Kamilah Barrett; Jamile McGee	Hip-Hop	"Toma"—Pitbull	Brian Friedman	Kamilah Barrett eliminated
Kamilah Barrett; Jamile McGee	Jive	"Jump, Jive and Wail"—Louis Prima	Glenn Weiss	Kamilah Barrett eliminated
Ashlé Dawson; Blake McGrath	Smooth Waltz	"Rilassamento"—Gianni Pavesi	Michael Mead	Blake McGrath eliminated
Ashlé Dawson; Blake McGrath	Argentine Tango	"Santa María (Del Buèn Ayré)"—Gotan Project	Alex Da Silva	Blake McGrath eliminated
Melody Lacayanga; Nick Lazzarini	Broadway	"All That Jazz" from Chicago	Tyce Diorio	Safe
Melody Lacayanga; Nick Lazzarini	Disco	"Knock on Wood"—Amii Stewart	Brian Friedman	Safe

- Top 6 contestant's solos:

Contestant	Style	Music	Result
Kamilah Barrett	Jazz	"Maniac"—Michael Sembello	Eliminated
Jamile McGee	Popping	"Atomic Dog"—George Clinton	Safe
Ashlé Dawson	Cha-Cha	"I Like It Like That"—Tito Nieves	Safe
Blake McGrath	Jazz	"Body Language"—Queen	Eliminated
Melody Lacayanga	Jazz	"Brave and Crazy"—Melissa Etheridge	Safe
Nick Lazzarini	Contemporary	"The First Time Ever I Saw Your Face"—Jeffrey Gaines	Safe

- Eliminated:
  - Kamilah Barrett
  - Blake McGrath

==== Week 7 (September 28, 2005) ====
Judges: Brian Friedman, Mia Michaels, Nigel Lythgoe, Mary Murphy and Dan Karaty

- Duo dances:

Couple	Style	Music	Choreographer(s)
Melody Lacayanga; Nick Lazzarini	Paso Doble	"España cañí"—Boston Pops Orchestra	Mary Murphy
Ashlé Dawson; Jamile McGee	Salsa	"Oh Mayi"—La Sonora Poncena	Alex Da Silva
Nick Lazzarini; Jamile McGee	Hip-Hop	"(Holla Back) Young'n"—Fabolous	Dan Karaty
Ashlé Dawson; Melody Lacayanga	Contemporary	"Message in a Bottle"—The Police	Mia Michaels
Melody Lacayanga; Jamile McGee	Jazz	"Cold Hearted"—Paula Abdul	Brian Friedman
Ashlé Dawson; Nick Lazzarini	Hip-Hop	"Feel the Girl"—Ms. Jade	Shane Sparks

- Top 4 contestant's solos:

Contestant	Style	Music
Melody Lacayanga	Contemporary	"Listen to Your Heart"—Roxette
Ashlé Dawson	Jazz	"Endangered Species"—Dianne Reeves
Jamile McGee	Popping	"Early in the Morning"—The Gap Band
Nick Lazzarini	Contemporary Jazz	"Pardon Me"—Incubus

- Freestyle round: Top 4: "Music"—John Miles

==== Week 8 (Finale) (October 5, 2005) ====
Judges: Brian Friedman, Mia Michaels, Nigel Lythgoe, Mary Murphy and Dan Karaty

- Group dance: Top 16: "Pump It"—The Black Eyed Peas (Hip-Hop; Choreographer: Shane Sparks)
- Guest dancers:

Dancer(s)	Style	Music
Alex Da Silva; Lauren Sánchez	Mambo	"Caravan"—Eddie Torres and his Mambo Kings
The Groovaloos	Breakdance	"It's Just Begun (Groovaloo Mix)"—Jimmy Castor Bunch
Anthony Bryant	Contemporary	"Love with My Eyes Closed"—Michael Bolton

- Top 4's favorite routines:

Couple	Style	Music	Choreographer(s)	Chosen by
Kamilah Barrett; Nick Lazzarini	Disco	"You Make Me Feel (Mighty Real)"—Sylvester James	Doriana Sánchez	Nick Lazzarini
Ashlé Dawson; Blake McGrath	Samba	"Jazz Machine"—Black Machine	Mary Murphy	Ashlé Dawson
Destini Rogers; Jamile McGee	Hip-Hop	"Shake"—Ying Yang Twins feat. Pitbull	Shane Sparks	Jamile McGee
Melody Lacayanga; Nick Lazzarini	Broadway	"All That Jazz" from Chicago	Tyce Diorio	Melody Lacayanga

- Places:

Place	Contestant	% of the votes
4th	Ashlé Dawson	8.8%
3rd	Jamile McGee	24.9%
2nd (Runner-up)	Melody Lacayanga	28.6%
1st (Winner)	Nick Lazzarini	37.7%

== Ratings ==
=== U.S. Nielsen ratings ===
Show	Episode	First air date	Rating (18–49)	Share (18–49)	Viewers (millions)	Rank (timeslot)	Rank (night)
1	Episode 101/102	July 20, 2005	6.4	11	10.3	1	1 (tied)
2	Episode 103	July 27, 2005	5.2	9	8.0	1	4
3	Hollywood: 50 Compete	August 3, 2005	4.4	8	7.0	2	6
4	Hollywood: 50 Cut to Top 16	August 10, 2005	4.2	7	6.3	2	5
5	Episode 106/107	August 17, 2005	5.0	8	7.4 (Note: Nielsen split this episode into two, so a combined average is displayed here. The first half gained 6.1 million viewers with a 4.2/8 rating/share, ranked number 1 in the timeslot and number 5 for the night. The second half, which aired at 8:30 pm, gained 8.7 million viewers with a 5.7/8 rating/share, and ranked number 1 in both the timeslot and night.)	1	2 (tied)
6	Episode 108	August 24, 2005	4.9	9	7.5 (Note: Nielsen split this episode into two, so a combined average is displayed here. The first half gained 6.4 million viewers with a 4.2/8 rating/share, ranked number 1 in the timeslot and number 6 for the night. The second half, which aired at 8:30 pm, gained 8.6 million viewers with a 5.6/9 rating/share, ranked number 1 in the timeslot and number 2 for the night.)	1	4
7	Episode 109	August 31, 2005	4.4	8	6.9 (Note: Nielsen split this episode into two, so a combined average is displayed here. The first half gained 5.9 million viewers with a 3.8/7 rating/share, ranked number 2 in the timeslot and number 8 for the night. The second half, which aired at 8:30 pm, gained 7.9 million viewers with a 4.9/8 rating/share, ranked number 1 in the timeslot and number 6 for the night.)	2	6
8	Episode 110	September 7, 2005	5.1	8	7.7	1	4
9	Episode 111	September 14, 2005	5.4	9	8.1	1	4
10	Episode 112	September 21, 2005	3.9	6	6.1	4	10
11	Episode 113	September 28, 2005	4.7	8	7.3	3	10
12	Episode 114	October 5, 2005	5.1	8	8.2	3	8

== See also ==
- List of So You Think You Can Dance finalists
