= Urbin =

Urbin is a surname. Notable people with the surname include:

- Péter Urbin (born 1984), Hungarian footballer
- Snejana Urbin, Russian dancer
