= Mia Michaels =

American choreographer and judge

Mia Michaels Melchiona
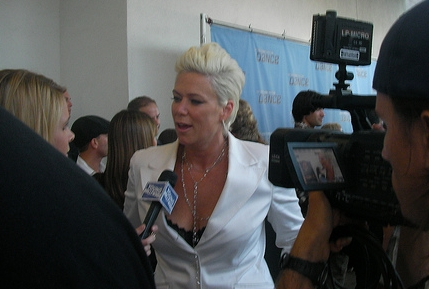
- Michaels is interviewed backstage after the So You Think You Can Dance season four finale, August 7, 2008.
- Born: February 22, 1966 (age 59); Coconut Grove, Miami, U.S.
- Occupation: Choreographer
- Awards: Outstanding Choreography; 2007 So You Think You Can Dance; Outstanding Choreography; 2010 So You Think You Can Dance; Outstanding Choreography; 2011 So You Think You Can Dance
- Website: miamichaels.com

Mia Michaels Melchiona (known professionally as Mia Michaels; born February 22, 1966) is an American choreographer and judge on the television show So You Think You Can Dance. She has worked with Tom Cruise, Celine Dion, Gloria Estefan, Madonna, Ricky Martin, Prince, and Catherine Zeta-Jones. In 2005 she choreographed Cirque du Soleil's world tour Delirium and Celine Dion's A New Day..., for which she received an Emmy Award nomination. In 2007 she won a Primetime Emmy Award for Outstanding Choreography for her routine on "Calling You" during season two of So You Think You Can Dance. She won another Emmy Award during season five in 2010. She was a judge during season 7 with Adam Shankman and Nigel Lythgoe. She choreographed the dance sequence for "Get Happy" in the episode "Bombshells" of the television series House.

== Early life ==
Mia Michaels was born in Coconut Grove, Florida on February 22, 1966, to a family of dancers. Her father, Joe Michaels, taught her jazz, tap, and ballet from the age of three at the Miami Dance Center. Her sister, Dana Michaels, taught her contemporary dance. Her brother Joe Melchiona owned and taught dance at Heidi & Joe's Dance Center in Miami Florida. While growing up, she attended summer sessions at Interlochen Center for the Arts in Michigan and at Jacob's Pillow in Becket, Massachusetts.

== Professional career ==
The choreography for Celine Dion's "A New Day" by Michaels, under the direction of Franco Dragone at Caesars' Palace in Las Vegas, received positive reviews. The show features a cast of 50 dancers. Michaels' work can be seen in the first touring show by Cirque du Soleil, Delirium, which premiered in March 2006. She has created works for Madonna, Ricky Martin, Gloria Estefan, Anna Vissi, and Prince.

Michaels is a judge and contributing choreographer for the FOX television show So You Think You Can Dance (abbreviated SYTYCD). She won an Emmy award for her choreography on the television series Calling You on SYTYCD. Her other works in film and television include Cool Women for AMC/DreamWorks Television and commercials for Mike's Hard Lemonade, Bacardi, Coldwell Banker, and Ziper. She also choreographed and played the character Olivia in the dance film Step Up Revolution.

The show's executive producer, Nigel Lythgoe, confirmed on October 15, 2009, Michaels' departure from the show. Lythgoe thanked Michaels for her assistance during the auditions phase of season 6, which was broadcast during the fall of 2009. He also made it known that Michaels was welcome to return to the show at any time during season 6 or in subsequent seasons. Michaels later revealed she left the show to participate as a choreographer for the Canadian and Australian versions of SYTYCD. In addition, Michaels shared she was moving forward on several other projects, including her own choreography show, participating in a documentary/reality show, working on a clothing line, and working on a book deal. Michaels did choreograph a routine for So You Think You Can Dance Canada's second season finale on October 25; the theme of the piece evoked her choice to depart the franchise. During rehearsal in Toronto, she injured her back and could not be present for the live performance.

Since June 2006, Michaels has been a columnist for Movmnt magazine.

In 2010, Bravo announced a television program focusing on Michaels.

Included in her concert and stage work is the dance company RAW (Reality at Work). She is the founder, artistic director, and choreographer since the beginning in 1997. She has created works for the Paper Mill Playhouse's production of Hello Dolly! starring Tovah Feldshuh, Les Ballet Jazz de Montreal, Jazz Dance Chicago, and Oslo Dance Ensemble. Her choreography has been seen off-Broadway in If These Shoes Could Talk and Fort Chaffee.

Michaels was one of many choreographers set to pay tribute to Michael Jackson at the 2009 MTV Video Music Awards. Michaels was to join Wade Robson, Tyce Diorio, Laurie Ann Gibson, Brian Friedman, and other dancer-choreographers in performing with Janet Jackson for her rendition of the song "Scream", but sustained an injury during rehearsals and was unable to perform on the show.

Michaels has been on the faculty of schools including the Harid Conservatory, the Ailey School of the Alvin Ailey American Dance Theater, Broadway Dance Center in New York City, and her alma mater, the New World School of the Arts. Her choreography has been enlisted for the Miami City Ballet, Joffrey II, the Kirov Academy, and the Jazz Theater of Amsterdam. She occasionally joins the staff of the dance convention JUMP. In 2017, she worked with the Joffery Ballet School for a summer intensive program.

When So You Think You Can Dance returned for its ninth season, Michaels returned to the show and choreographed the Top 20 group performance.

In 2012, Michaels choreographed for the film Rock of Ages. In 2015, she provided the choreography for the Broadway musical Finding Neverland. In 2016, she choreographed the New York Christmas Spectacular starring the Rockettes. In 2019, it was announced that Michaels would provide choreography for the 2020 animated film The SpongeBob Movie: It's a Wonderful Sponge.

=== So You Think You Can Dance ===
Season	Week	Dancers	Dance style	Music	Notes
1	2	Destini Rogers; Blake McGrath	Lyrical Jazz	"A Song for You" – Donny Hathaway	
1	2	Ashlé Dawson; Artem Chigvintsev	Lyrical Jazz	"A Song for You" – Donny Hathaway	
1	5	Kamilah Barrett; Nick Lazzarini	Contemporary	"King of Pain" – The Police	
1	7	Ashlé Dawson; Melody Lacayanga	Contemporary	"Message in a Bottle" – The Police	
2	LVW*	All Dancers	Contemporary	N/A	
2	6	Travis Wall; Heidi Groskreutz	Contemporary	"Calling You" – Celine Dion	Emmy Award for Outstanding Choreography 2007; Heidi Groskreutz's favorite routine of the season
2	6	Allison Holker; Ryan Rankine	Contemporary	"Ethna" – Klement Bonelli	
2	8	Top 6	Contemporary	"Hide and Seek" from Imogen Heap	Result Show
2	9	Donyelle Jones; Travis Wall	Contemporary	"Georgia on My Mind" – Ray Charles	
3	LVW	All Dancers	Contemporary	"I Miss You" – Vitamin String Quartet	
3	1	Lacey Schwimmer; Kameron Bink	Contemporary	"Dancing" – Elisa	
3	3	Shauna Noland; Cedric Gardner	Contemporary	"I Thought We Had" – The Family Stand	
3	5	Lauren Gottlieb; Neil Haskell	Contemporary	"Let the Drummer Kick" – Citizen Cope	
3	6	Top 10	Contemporary	"The Moment I Said It" – Imogen Heap	Result Show
3	7	Lacey Schwimmer; Neil Haskell	Contemporary	"Time" – Billy Porter	Dan Karaty's favorite routine of the season
3	8	Lauren Gottlieb; Danny Tidwell	Contemporary	"Then You Look at Me" – Celine Dion	
3	9	Neil Haskell; Danny Tidwell	Contemporary	"Are You the One?" – The Presets	
4	LVW	All Dancers	Contemporary	Mic Check – Imogen Heap	
4	1	Chelsie Hightower; Mark Kanemura	Contemporary	"Beautiful" – Meshell Ndegeocello	
4	3	Top 16	Contemporary	"The Dance" – Charlotte Martin	Result Show
4	4	Kherington Payne; Stephen "tWitch" Boss	Contemporary	"Dreaming with a Broken Heart" – John Mayer	
4	4	Katee Shean; Joshua Allen	Contemporary	"Hometown Glory" – Adele	
4	6	Top 5 female dancers	Contemporary	"Ave Maria" – Celine Dion	Result Show
4	7	Katee Shean; Stephen "tWitch" Boss	Contemporary	"Mercy" – Duffy	Nominated for the 2009 Emmy Award for Outstanding Choreography; Mary Murphy's favorite routine of the season
4	9	Top 4	Contemporary	"Hallelujah" – The Vitamin String Quartet	
5	LVW	All Dancers	Contemporary	"Belief (Stripped Version)" – Gavin DeGraw	
5	2	Top 18	Contemporary	"Higher Ground" – Stevie Wonder	Result Show
5	3	Randi Evans; Evan Kasprzak	Contemporary	"Koop Island Blues" – Koop featuring Ane Brun	Won the 2010 Emmy Award for Outstanding Choreography; One of Adam Shankman's favorite routines of the season
5	5	Kayla Radomski; Kūpono Aweau	Contemporary	"Gravity" – Sara Bareilles	Won the 2010 Emmy Award for Outstanding Choreography; One of Nigel Lythgoe's favorite routines of the season
5	7	Top 8	Contemporary	"One" from A Chorus Line	Won the 2010 Emmy Award for Outstanding Choreography; Result Show
5	9	Jeanine Mason; Kayla Radomski	Contemporary	Contemporary	"The Four Sections: IV (Full Orchestra)" – Steve Reich
7	1	Billy Bell; Ade Obayomi; Alex Wong	Contemporary	"This Bitter Earth/On the Nature of Daylight" – Max Richter and Dinah Washington	
7	4	Top 8	Contemporary	"When We Dance" – Sting	
7	7	Top 6 All-Stars	Contemporary	"Every Little Thing She Does Is Magic" – Sting	
9	1	Top 20	Contemporary	"Eyes" (Coachella Live 2012 version) – Kaskade	
9	4	Top 14	Contemporary	"Hanging On" – Active Child	All couples perform routines choreographed by Mia Michaels form previous seasons.
9	4	Eliana Girard; Cyrus "Glitch" Spencer	Contemporary	Mercy – Duffy	From Season 4
9	4	Tiffany Maher; George Lawrence Jr.	Contemporary	Hometown Glory – Adele	From Season 4
9	4	Amelia Lowe; Will Thomas	Contemporary	"Koop Island Blues" – Koop feat. Ane Brun	From Season 5
9	4	Janelle Issis; Dareian Kujawa	Contemporary	Dreaming with a Broken Heart – John Mayer	From Season 4
9	4	Audrey Case; Matthew Kazmierczak	Contemporary	"Time" – Billy Porter	From Season 3
9	4	Witney Carson; Chehon Wespi-Tschopp	Contemporary	Calling You – Celine Dion	From Season 2
9	4	Lindsay Arnold; Cole Horibe	Contemporary	"Gravity" – Sara Bareilles	From season 5
9	7	Eliana Girard; Cole Horibe	Contemporary	"Adagio for Strings" – Brno Philharmonic Orchestra	
10	MT20*	Hayley Erbert; Carlos Garland; Malece Miller	Contemporary	"Stay – Rihanna feat. Mikky Ekko	
10	8	Top 8	Contemporary	"Move to the Ocean" (Baauer remix) – Brick & Mortar	
14	7	Lex Ishimoto Taylor Sieve	Contemporary	"You Matter To Me" by Sara Bareilles ft. Jason Mraz	
15	4	Top 6	Contemporary	"Spring 1" – Max Richter	

- LVW=Las Vegas Week
- MT20=Meet Top 20

=== So You Think You Can Dance Canada ===
Season	Week	Dancers	Dance style	Music
2	8	Top 3 Girls	Contemporary	"Concerto for 2 Violins in D Minor, BMV 1043: II. Largo ma non Tanto J. S. Bach" – The Scottish Ensemble/Jonathan Rees
2	9	Top 10	Contemporary	"This Moment" – Nic Chagall ft. Jonathan Mendelsohn
3	3	Top 18	Jazz	"Let Go" – Mitzi Gaynor
3	6	Top 12	Contemporary	"Will I?" from Rent
4	9	Top 3 Girls	Contemporary	"What About Us" – ATB

== Awards and honors ==
Year	Award	Category	Work	Result
1992	Jazz Dance World Congress	Silver Leo Award		Won
Dance Educators of America		President Cup		Won
2002	American Choreography Awards	Outstanding Achievement in Commercials	Coldwell Banker "Buying"	Nominated
2003	American Choreography Awards	Outstanding Achievement in Television - Variety Series	Celine in Las Vegas: Opening Night Live	Nominated
2003	Primetime Emmy Award	Outstanding Choreography	Celine in Las Vegas: Opening Night Live	Nominated
2007	Primetime Emmy Award	Outstanding Choreography	So You Think You Can Dance ( For episode Calling You)	Won
2009	Primetime Emmy Award	Outstanding Choreography	So You Think You Can Dance (For "Mercy")	Nominated
2010	Primetime Emmy Award	Outstanding Choreography	So You Think You Can Dance (For the routines "Koop Island Blues," "Gravity," and "One")	Won
2011	Primetime Emmy Award	Outstanding Choreography	So You Think You Can Dance (For the routines "Every Little Thing She Does Is Magic," "When We Dance," "This Bitter Earth/On the Nature of Daylight" (tied with Tabitha and Napoleon D'umo)	Won
2015	Astaire Awards	Best Choreographer	Finding Neverland	Nominated
