= So You Think You Can Dance (American TV series) season 12 =

So You Think You Can Dance
- Season 12
- Hosted by: Cat Deeley
- Judges: Nigel Lythgoe; Paula Abdul; Jason Derulo
- Winner: Gaby Diaz
- Runner-up: Džajna "Jaja" Vaňková

Release
- Original network: Fox
- Original release: June 1 – September 14, 2015

Season chronology
- ← Previous; Season 11 Next → Season 13

So You Think You Can Dance, an American dance competition show, returned for its twelfth season, titled So You Think You Can Dance: Stage Vs. Street, on Monday, June 1, 2015. Seventeen episodes were broadcast on the Fox Network, including episode nine on Tuesday, July 21, 2015, which was a special celebrating the tenth anniversary of the show titled "A Decade of Dance Special Edition". The sixteen regular episodes aired each week on Mondays, rather than Wednesdays as it had been in recent previous seasons. On September 14, 2015, Gaby Diaz won the competition and made history by becoming the first tap contestant to win the title.

Auditions were held in Dallas TX, Detroit MI, Los Angeles CA, Memphis TN and New York NY.

== Judges ==
Series creator and executive producer Nigel Lythgoe returned as a member of the permanent judging panel, along with new permanent members Paula Abdul and Jason Derulo.

The Team Captains, Travis Wall for Team Stage and tWitch for Team Street, were consulted on the selections for each team during the Vegas Call Backs.

Mary Murphy, who was a permanent judge in seasons 3 through 6 and seasons 8 through to 11, has not returned. Host Cat Deeley returns for her eleventh consecutive season.

== Format ==
Season 12 featured a significant shift in format in that it was the first season where contestants were not selected based on their gender. Contestants were selected based on whether the contestant considered themselves a "Stage" contestant or a "Street" contestant. Stage styles included ballet, contemporary, jazz and tap, while the Street styles included freestyle, break dancing, hip-hop, and krump. Previously, the contestants were selected across all genres and were divided by gender, with ten women and ten men being selected for the Top Twenty. This new format allowed the judges to respond to the strong number of female street contestants, and resulted in the Top Twenty, being eleven female contestants and nine male contestants.

Once the "Top 20" were selected the public voted on their favourite contestants and the three stage and three street contestants with fewest votes were in danger of elimination. The mediums through which the public could vote continued from the previous season's methods of online through the So You Think You Can Dance website on fox.com, the Fox Now app, and SMS. Voting via telephone was once again not available.

The judges selected one stage contestant and one street contestant from the remaining four contestants to be eliminated from the competition. When ten contestants were left in the competition, contestants were then eliminated purely on the votes from the public.

Season 12 saw the introduction of the ability for the audience to save one contestant from the stage and street teams from elimination, but only for the first four eliminations. When the Bottom 6 contestant were revealed during the live show, a five-minute period for Twitter voting was announced with one vote allowed for stage and for street per Twitter account. Once those contestants were saved, the judges were allowed to save one more contestant from each team for the first three eliminations; since the fourth was a double elimination, the Twitter vote was the only save; the judges had no say that week.

Once Top Ten were revealed, neither the audience nor judges were allowed to save any contestants.

== Auditions ==
Open auditions for season 12 were held in five cities beginning on January 24, 2015. Lythgoe, Abdul and Derulo were the three judges for all the auditions.

In a change from previous years, the city auditions no longer had a "choreography round," where contestants whom the judges thought might not be able to handle someone else's choreography were taught a routine they then had to perform.

Air Date	Audition Venue	City	Audition Date
June 22, 2015	Manhattan Center Grand Ballroom & Hammerstein Ballroom	New York, New York	January 24, 2015
June 1, 2015	Southern Methodist University, McFarlin Memorial Auditorium	Dallas, Texas	February 14, 2015
June 8, 2015	The Fillmore Detroit	Detroit, Michigan	February 22, 2015
June 1, 2015	Orpheum Theatre	Memphis, Tennessee	March 8, 2015
June 15, 2015	Orpheum Theatre	Los Angeles, California	March 15, 2015

== Callbacks ==
Callbacks were held in Las Vegas for season 12, a return to previous practice after season 11's were held in Los Angeles. A total of 219 contestants were given tickets at the five audition cities to the Las Vegas callbacks: 114 were selected for Team Stage, mentored by Travis Wall, and 105 were selected for Team Street, mentored by Stephen "tWitch" Boss. The first callback episode was scheduled for June 29, 2015, and the second callback episode, during which the Top 20 of 10 stage contestants and 10 street contestants is revealed, aired on July 6, 2015.

== Studio Shows ==
=== Top 20 Contestants ===
==== Team Stage ====
Contestant	Age	Home Town	Dance Style	Elimination date	Placement
Gabrielle "Gaby" Diaz	19	Miami, FL	Tap	September 14, 2015	Overall Winner
Hailee Payne	20	Roy, UT	Jazz	September 14, 2015	Stage Runner-Up
James "Jim" Nowakowski	26	Rochester, NY	Ballet	August 31, 2015	Top 6
Derek Piquette	18	Chicopee, MA	Contemporary	August 24, 2015	Top 8
Edson Juarez	24	Mission, TX	Contemporary	August 17, 2015	Top 10
Alexia Meyer	19	Orem, UT	Lyrical Jazz	August 10, 2015	Top 14
Kate Harpootlian	27	Columbia, SC	Contemporary	August 10, 2015	Top 14
Marissa Milele	20	Nashville, TN	Jazz	August 3, 2015	Top 16
Moises Parra	18	Garden Grove, CA	Contemporary	July 27, 2015	Top 18
Darion Flores	19	Hartford, CT	Ballet	July 20, 2015	Top 20

==== Team Street ====
Contestant	Age	Home Town	Dance Style	Elimination date	Placement
Jana "Jaja" Vaňková	23	Děčín, Czech Republic	Animation/Krump	September 14, 2015	Overall Runner-up
Virgil "Lil O" Gadson	28	Philadelphia, PA	Hip Hop	September 14, 2015	Street Runner-Up
Megan "Megz" Alfonso	29	Long Island, NY	Hip Hop	August 31, 2015	Top 6
Eddie "Neptune" Eskridge	25	Dallas, TX	Freestyle	August 24, 2015	Top 8
Jessica "JJ" Rabone	30	Kawasaki, Japan	House/Waacking	August 17, 2015	Top 10
Ariana Crowder	22	Somerset, NJ	Hip Hop	August 10, 2015	Top 14
Yorelis Apolinario	19	Tampa, FL	Freestyle	August 10, 2015	Top 14
Asaf Goren	23	Tel Aviv, Israel	Breakdance	August 3, 2015	Top 16
Burim "B1" Jusufi	29	Baden, Switzerland	Breakdance	July 27, 2015	Top 18
Lily Frias	23	Durango, Mexico	Waacking	July 20, 2015	Top 20

==== Note ====
- Alain "Hurrikane" Lauture had to leave the competition due to injury. Thus the judges brought back Asaf Goren who was number 11 in Team Street.

==== Elimination chart ====
Legend
Female	Male	Team Stage	Team Street	Bottom 6 contestants	Bottom 4 contestants	Eliminated

Week:	7/20	7/27	8/3	8/10	8/17	8/24	8/31	9/14
Contestant	Result							
Gaby Diaz								Winner
Jana "Jaja" Vaňková								Runner-Up
Virgil Gadson								Elim
Hailee Payne						Btm 4		Elim
Jim Nowakowski							Elim	
Megan "Megz" Alfonso					Btm 4	Btm 4	Elim	
Derek Piquette	Btm 4		Btm 6	Btm 6	Btm 4	Elim		
Eddie "Neptune" Eskridge	Btm 6			Btm 6		Elim		
Edson Juarez		Btm 4			Elim			
Jessica "JJ" Rabone			Btm 6		Elim			
Alexia Meyer				Elim				
Yorelis Apolinario				Elim				
Kate Harpootlian		Btm 6	Btm 4	Elim				
Ariana Crowder	Btm 4	Btm 6	Btm 4	Elim				
Marissa Milele			Elim					
Asaf Goren		Btm 4	Elim					
Moises Parra	Btm 6	Elim						
Burim "B1" Jusufi		Elim						
Darion Flores	Elim							
Lily Frias	Elim							

=== Performances ===
==== Meet the Top 20 (July 13, 2015) ====
- Judges: Nigel Lythgoe, Paula Abdul, Jason Derulo
- Performances: Jason Derulo

Contestants	Style	Music	Choreographer(s)	Result
Top 20	Hip-hop	"Revolt"—Nathan Lanier	Christopher Scott	N/A
Megan "Megz" Alfonso; Jessica "JJ" Rabone; Eddie "Neptune" Eskridge*	Hip-hop	"The Illest"—Far East Movement feat. Riff Raff	Dave Scott	Eskridge Bottom 6*
Gaby Diaz; Derek Piquette; Moises Parra*	Contemporary	"Luminous"—Max Richter	Stacey Tookey	Parra Bottom 6* Piquette Bottom 6
Lily Frias; Jana "Jaja" Vaňková; Asaf Goren; Burim "B1" Jusufi	Hip-hop	"Easy"—Son Lux feat. Lorde	Christopher Scott	Frias Eliminated
Hailee Payne; Alexia Meyer; Marissa Milele	Jazz	"New Dorp New York"—SBTRKT feat. Ezra Koenig	Brian Friedman	Safe
Jim Nowakowski; Darion Flores	Ballet	"Blood and Stone"—Audiomachine	Benoit Swan Pouffer	Flores Eliminated
Ariana Crowder; Yorelis Apolinario; Virgil "Lil O" Gadson	Hip-hop	"Locked Out of Heaven"—Bruno Mars	Christopher "Pharside" Jennings; Krystal "Phoenix" Meraz	Crowder Bottom 6
Kate Harpootlian; Edson Juarez	Contemporary	"Shaped Like A Gun"—Tailor	Travis Wall	Safe
Team Stage	Broadway	"Body Language"—Queen	Warren Carlyle	N/A
Team Street	Hip-hop	"Ready or Not Here I Come"—District 78 feat. Cheesa	Tabitha D'umo; Napoleon D'umo	N/A

==== Top 20 (July 20, 2015) ====
- Judges: Nigel Lythgoe, Paula Abdul, Jason Derulo

Contestants	Style	Music	Choreographer(s)	Result
Top 20	Hip-hop	"Baila Como Yo"—District 78	Christopher "Pharside" Jennings; Krystal "Phoenix" Meraz	N/A
Hailee Payne; Yorelis Apolinario; ~~Darion Flores~~	Salsa	"Blucutu"—Saamara	Jonathan Platero; Oksana Dmytrenko	Safe
Ariana Crowder*; Derek Piquette	Jazz	"Cry Me a River"—Michael Bublé	Ray Leeper	Crowder Bottom 6*
Virgil "Lil O" Gadson; Megz Alfonso; Alexia Meyer	Contemporary	"Until We Go Down"—Ruelle	Dee Caspary	Safe
~~Lily Frias~~; Burim Jusufi; Gaby Diaz; Edson Juarez	Bollywood	"Dhol Baaje" from Ek Paheli Leela	Nakul Dev Mahajan	Jusufi Eliminated; Juarez Bottom 6
Asaf Goren; Kate Harpootlian*; Eddie "Neptune" Eskridge	Broadway	"All About That Bass"—Scott Bradlee's Postmodern Jukebox featuring Kate Davis	Spencer Liff	Goren Bottom 6 Harpootlian Bottom 6*
Jana "Jaja" Vaňková; Jim Nowakowski	Lyrical hip-hop	"No Woman, No Cry (Live Version)"—Bob Marley and the Wailers	Christopher Scott	Safe
Marissa Milele; Moises Parra; JJ Rabone	Jazz	"I'm So Sorry"—Imagine Dragons	Ray Leeper	Parra Eliminated
Team Street	Hip-hop	"Time"—Nathan Lanier	Christopher Scott; Phillip Chbeeb (season 5)	N/A
Team Stage	Contemporary	"Stabat Mater"—Woodkid	Travis Wall	N/A

==== Top 18 (July 27, 2015) ====
- Judges: Nigel Lythgoe, Paula Abdul, Jason Derulo

Contestants	Style	Music	Choreographer(s)	Result
Top 18	Afro Funk	"Let The Groove Get In"—Justin Timberlake	Reina Hidalgo; Asiel Hardison	N/A
Alexia Meyer; Derek Piquette; Jana "Jaja" Vaňková	Contemporary	"All Waters"—Perfume Genius	Stacey Tookey	Piquette Bottom 6*
Megz Alfonso; Jim Nowakowski; ~~Moises Parra~~	Hip-hop	"Whuteva"—Remy Ma	JaQuel Knight	Safe
JJ Rabone; Edson Juarez; Yorelis Apolinario	Jazz	"Restart"—Sam Smith	Tovaris Wilson	Rabone Bottom 6*
Asaf Goren; Marissa Milele	Club cha-cha	"+1"—Martin Solveig ft Sam White	Jean-Marc Genereux	Both Eliminated
Gaby Diaz; ~~Burim Jusufi~~; Ariana Crowder	African Jazz	"Gorilla"—Lord Kraven	Sean Cheesman	Crowder Bottom 6
Kate Harpootlian; Eddie "Neptune" Eskridge	Contemporary	"Promise"—Ben Howard	Justin Giles	Harpootlian Bottom 6
Hailee Payne; Virgil "Lil O" Gadson	Hip-hop	"Runnin'"—Noahplause	Christopher "Pharside" Jennings; Krystal "Phoenix" Meraz	Safe
Team Stage	Contemporary	"For My Help"—Hayden Calnin	Jaci Royal	N/A
Team Street	Hip-hop	"Break Ya Neck"—Busta Rhymes	Marty Kudelka	N/A

==== Top 16 (August 3, 2015) ====
- Judges: Nigel Lythgoe, Paula Abdul, Jason Derulo

Contestants	Style	Music	Choreographer(s)	Result
Top 16		"Love is Free"—Robyn & La Bagatelle Magique ft Maluca	Nick Flores; RJ Durrell	N/A
Hailee Payne; Jana "Jaja" Vaňková	Jazz	"Endangered Species"—Dianne Reeves	Ray Leeper	Safe
Eddie "Neptune" Eskridge; Alexia Meyer	Hip-hop	"Flex (Ooh Ooh Ooh)"—Rich Homie Quan	Dave Scott	Eskridge Bottom 6* Meyer Eliminated
JJ Rabone*; Leonardo Barrionuevo++	Argentine Tango	"Duo de Amor"—Astor Piazzolla	Miriam Larici; Leonardo Barrionuevo	Piquette Bottom 6*
Ariana Crowder; Jim Nowakowski	Contemporary	"Everybody Wants to Rule the World"—Lorde	Sean Cheesman	Crowder Eliminated
Virgil "Lil O" Gadson; Gaby Diaz	Broadway	"Where or When"—Sammy Davis Jr.	Al Blackstone	Safe
~~Asaf Goren~~; Kate Harpootlian	Pop Jazz	Braveheart—Neon Jungle	Sean Cheesman	Harpootlian Eliminated
~~Marissa Milele~~; Yorelis Apolinario	Hip-hop	"Let Go"—Kezwik ft. Mimi Page	Christopher Scott	Apolinario Eliminated
Edson Juarez; Megz Alfonso	Contemporary	"You There"—Aquilo	Talia Favia	Safe
Team Street	Hip-hop	"Commas"—Future	Luam	N/A
Team Stage	Contemporary	"Beautiful Friends"—Helen Money	Travis Wall	N/A

++JJ's pair Derek Piquette injured his back during rehearsals and was advised by doctors to rest for the week. As a result, JJ performed with her choreographer Leonardo Barrionuevo and Derek Piquette is automatically in the Bottom 6 for next week.

Note: The "asterisk" symbol shows that the contestant was saved by the live Twitter vote.

==== Top 14 (August 10, 2015) ====
- Judges: Nigel Lythgoe, Paula Abdul, Jason Derulo

Contestants	Style	Music	Choreographer(s)	Result
Top 14		"100% Pure Love"—Crystal Waters	Brian Friedman	N/A
Jim Nowakowski; ~~Yorelis Apolinario~~	Jazz	"Asht"—Nebulo	Sonya Tayeh	Safe
Edson Juarez; Jana "Jaja" Vaňková	Hip-hop	"She Came to Give It to You"—Usher feat. Nicki Minaj	Misha Gabriel	Juarez Eliminated
Virgil "Lil O" Gadson; Hailee Payne	Contemporary	"Cellophane"—Sia	Tyce Diorio	Safe
~~Alexia Meyer~~; ~~Ariana Crowder~~	Burlesque Jazz	"Circus Fish"—Vermillion Lies	Tracy Phillips; Dominic Carbone	
Derek Piquette; Megz Alfonso	Hip-hop	"Worth It" — Fifth Harmony feat. Kid Ink	Dave Scott	Both Bottom 4
Eddie "Neptune" Eskridge; Gaby Diaz	Contemporary	"Take my Hand, Precious Lord"—Ledisi (Selma Soundtrack)	Stacey Tookey	Safe
JJ Rabone; ~~Kate Harpootlian~~	Pop Jazz	"A Different Beat"—Little Mix	Brian Friedman	Rabone Eliminated
Team Street	Hip-hop	"Dragula"—Rob Zombie	Christopher "Pharside" Jennings; Krystal "Phoenix" Meraz	N/A
Team Stage	Contemporary	"Lift Me"—The Bengsons	Sonya Tayeh	N/A

==== Top 10 (August 17, 2015) ====
- Group Dance: Music: "Earth Intruders"—Björk, Style: Jazz; Choreographer: Sonya Tayeh
- Judges: Nigel Lythgoe, Paula Abdul, Jason Derulo

Contestants	Style	Music	Choreographer(s)	Result
Hailee Payne; Brandon Bryant	Broadway	"It Don't Mean a Thing (if it Ain't Got That Swing"—Tony Bennett and Lady Gaga	Warren Carlyle	Bottom 4
Derek Piquette; Kayla Radomski	Jazz	"Got It"—Marian Hill	RJ Durell; Nick Florez	Eliminated
~~JJ Rabone++~~				
Virgil "Lil O" Gadson; Comfort Fedoke	Hip-hop	"Just My Imagination (Running Away With Me)"—The Temptations	Christopher Scott	Safe
Megz Alfonso; Marko Germar	Jazz	"Canned Heat"—Jamiroquai	Ray Leeper	Bottom 4
~~Edson Juarez~~; Jaimie Goodwin	Contemporary	"Your Day Will Come"—Son Lux	Travis Wall	
Eddie "Neptune" Eskridge; Jasmine Harper	Hip-hop	"Milk Was a Bad Choice"—"Yultron"	Christopher "Pharside" Jennings and Krystal "Phoenix" Meraz	Eliminated
Jim Nowakowski; Jessica Richens	Contemporary	"Heal"—Tom Odell	Dee Caspary	Safe
Jaja Vankova; Alex Wong	Bollywood	"Naacho Re"—Jai Ho soundtrack	Nakul Dev Mahajan	Safe
Gaby Diaz; Joshua Allen	Hip-hop	"I'm Really Hot"—Missy Elliott	Christopher "Pharside" Jennings and Krystal "Phoenix" Meraz	Safe

++JJ Rabone injured her ribs during rehearsals and was not medically cleared to perform either her solo or with an all-star pair. She would automatically have been in the Bottom 4 for the next week had she not been eliminated.

- Top 10 contestant's solos:

Contestant	Style	Music
Virgil Gadson	Hip-hop	"Conqueror" —Empire Cast feat. Estelle Smollett and Jussie Smollett
Eddie "Neptune" Eskridge	Freestyle	"Power of the Empire"—Empire Cast feat. Yazz
Gaby Diaz	Tap	"Can't Truss 'Em"—Empire Cast feat. Yazz
Jaja Vankova	Animation/Krump	"Keep It Movin"—Empire Cast feat. Serayah McNeill and Yazz
Jim Nowakowski	Ballet	"You're So Beautiful"—Empire Cast feat. Jussie Smollett and Yazz
Hailee Payne	Contemporary	"Nothing to Lose"—Empire Cast feat. Jussie Smollett
Derek Piquette	Contemporary	"Drip Drop"—Empire Cast feat. Yazz and Serayah McNeill
Megz Alfonso	Hip-hop	"No Apologies"—Empire Cast feat. Jussie Smollett and Yazz
Edson Juarez	Contemporary	"I Wanna Love You"—Empire Cast feat. Jussie Smollett

==== Top 8 (August 24, 2015) ====
- Group Dance: Music: "Lillies of the Valley"—Pina (soundtrack), Style: Broadway; Choreographer: Tyce Diorio
- Judges: Nigel Lythgoe, Paula Abdul, Jason Derulo

Contestants	Style	Music	Choreographer(s)	Result
Virgil Gadson; Jasmine Harper	African jazz	"Kintamani (Hanoman's Forest Mix") —Transglobal Underground	Sean Cheesman	Safe
~~Derek Piquette~~; Jaimie Goodwin	Contemporary	"Never Dreamed You'd Leave In Summer"—Stevie Wonder	Tyce Diorio	
Hailee Payne; Dushant "Fik-Shun" Stegall	Hip-hop	"Let It Go"—Chonique Sneed	Luther Brown	Safe
Megz Alfonso; Paul Karmiryan	Paso Doble	"Blade of Blood"—Tom Player	Jean-Marc Genereux	Eliminated
~~Eddie "Neptune" Eskridge~~; Kayla Radomski	Jazz	"Infinity" —The xx	Ray Leeper	
Jim Nowakowski; Comfort Fedoke	Hip-hop	"Hey Mama"—David Guetta feat. Nicki Minaj, Bebe Rexha and Afrojack	"Christopher "Pharside" Jennings" and "Krystal "Phoenix" Meraz"	Eliminated
Gaby Diaz; Robert Roldan	Contemporary	"Angel"—Sarah McLachlan	Mandy Moore	Safe
Jaja Vankova; Ricky Ubeda	Broadway	"Let's Face The Music and Dance"— Nat King Cole	Al Blackstone	Safe
Team Street	Hip-hop	"Finna Get Loose"—Puff Daddy and The Family feat. Pharrell Williams	Dave Scott	N/A
Team Stage	Contemporary	"Give Me Love"—Ed Sheeran	Tessandra Chavez	N/A

- Top 8 contestant's solos:

Contestant	Style	Music
Jim Nowakowski	Ballet	"The Four Seasons: Summer"—Antonio Vivaldi
Jaja Vankova	Animation/Krump	"Hype City"—Tighteyez
Gaby Diaz	Tap	"Oye Como Va"—Santana
Derek Piquette	Contemporary	"Two Men In Love"—The Irrepressibles
Virgil Gadson	Hip-hop	"i"—Kendrick Lamar
Hailee Payne	Jazz	"Vanguardian"—Steed Lord
Megz Alfonso	Hip-hop	"Delirious (Boneless)"—Steve Aoki, Chris Lake and Tujamo feat. Kid Ink
Eddie "Neptune" Eskridge	Freestyle	"Get Big"—Dorrough

==== Top 6 (August 31, 2015) ====
- Group Dance: Music: "Everybody Hurts"—Jasmine Thompson Style: Contemporary; Choreographer: Mandy Moore
- Judges: Nigel Lythgoe, Paula Abdul, Jason Derulo

Contestants	Style	Music	Choreographer(s)
Gaby Diaz; Marko Germar	Pop Jazz	"Emergency"—Icona Pop	Ray Leeper
Jaja Vankova; Alex Wong	Contemporary	"Youth"—Daughter	Tessandra Chavez
~~Megz Alfonso~~; Joshua Allen	Hip-hop	"Freedom"—Pharrell Williams	Christopher Scott
~~Jim Nowakowski~~; Anya Garnis	Samba	"Chillando Goma"—Fulanito	Dmitry Chaplin
Virgil Gadson; Melanie Moore	Contemporary	"All Is Now Harmed"—Ben Howard	Justin Giles
Hailee Payne; Robert Roldan	Jazz	"Haunted"—Beyoncé	RJ Durell and Nick Florez
Gaby Diaz; ~~Jim Nowakowski~~	Broadway	"Fever"—Michael Bublé	Josh Bergasse
Hailee Payne; ~~Megz Alfonso~~	Contemporary	"Sarajevo"—Max Richter and Sara Leonard	Stacey Tookey
Jaja Vankova; Virgil Gadson	Hip-hop	"If You Crump Stand Up"—edIT	"Christopher "Pharside" Jennings" and "Krystal "Phoenix" Meraz"

- Top 6 contestant's solos:

Contestant	Style	Music
Virgil Gadson	Hip-hop	"Rock the Bells"—LL Cool J
Hailee Payne	Jazz	"Elastic Heart"—Sia
Gaby Diaz	Tap	"It's Your Thing"—Christian McBride feat. Dee Dee Bridgewater
Jaja Vankova	Animation/Krump	"Laundry"—edIT
Jim Nowakowski	Ballet	"Ra"—Nathan Lanier
Megz Alfonso	Hip-hop	"Let It Go"—James Bay

==== Top 4 Performance Finale (September 7, 2015) ====
- Judges: Nigel Lythgoe, Paula Abdul, Jason Derulo

Contestants	Style	Music	Choreographer(s)
Jaja Vankova; Hailee Payne	Hip-hop	"Put It In The Bag"—Kalenna feat. B Simm	Misha Gabriel and Nick Bass
Gaby Diaz; Virgil Gadson	Lyrical hip-hop	"Slip"—Elliot Moss	Phillip Chbeeb (season 5)
Gaby Diaz; Jaja Vankova	Jazz	"Woman (Oh Mama)"—Joy Williams	Nick Florez and RJ Durell
Jaja Vankova; Virgil Gadson	Contemporary	"I Love You (Acoustic)"—Woodkid	Stacey Tookey
Hailee Payne; Virgil Gadson	Broadway	"Billy-A-Dick"—Bette Midler	Josh Bergasse
Gaby Diaz; Hailee Payne	Contemporary	"Do Not Hang Your Head"—Elizabeth & the Catapult	Travis Wall
Virgil Gadson; Joshua Allen	Hip-hop	"Let's Go"—Trick Daddy feat. Twista and Lil Jon	Christopher "Pharside" Jennings and Krystal "Phoenix" Meraz
Hailee Payne; Marko Germar	Jazz	"All Nite (Don't Stop)"—Janet Jackson	Ray Leeper
Jaja Vankova; Cyrus "Glitch" Spencer	Animation	"Kaolo"—Yellow Claw	Christopher Scott
Gaby Diaz; Zack Everhart	Tap	"Dibidy Dop (Swing Mix)"—Club des Belugas feat. Brenda Boykin	Anthony Morigerato

- Top 4 contestant's solos:

Contestant	Style	Music
Gaby Diaz	Tap	"Magalenha"—Sérgio Mendes
Virgil Gadson	Hip-hop/Animation	"A Beautiful Mine"—RJD2
Hailee Payne	Jazz	"Cold Hearted"—Paula Abdul
Jaja Vankova	Animation/Krump	"Street Side"—20 Killz

==== Season Finale (September 14, 2015): Judges & grand-finalists' picks ====
Contestants	Style	Music	Choreographer	Chosen by
Virgil Gadson; Joshua Allen	Hip-hop	"Let's Go"—Trick Daddy	Pharside & Phoenix	Jason Derulo
Edson Juarez; Megz Alfonso	Contemporary	"You There"—Aquilo	Talia Favia	Paula Abdul
Jaja Vankova; Ricky Ubeda	Broadway	"Let's Face The Music and Dance"—Nat King Cole	Al Blackstone	Paula Abdul
Team Street	Hip-hop	"Ready or Not Here I Come"—District 78	Tabitha and Napoleon D'umo	Cat Deeley
Gaby Diaz; Neptune Eskridge	Contemporary	"Take My Hand"—Precious Lord	Stacey Tookey	tWitch
Little Phoenix; Cyrus Spencer	Animation	"Emergency"—District 78	—	Nigel Lythgoe
Hailee Payne; Robert Roldan	Jazz	"Haunted"—Beyoncé	RJ Durell and Nick Florez	Hailee Payne
Gaby Diaz; Joshua Allen	Hip-hop	"I'm Really Hot"—Missy Elliott	Pharside & Phoenix	Travis Wall
Team Stage	Contemporary	"Beautiful Friends"—Helen Money	Travis Wall	Jason Derulo
Virgil Gadson; Hailee Payne	Hip-hop	"Runnin'"—Noahplause	Pharside & Phoenix	Virgil Gadson
Jim Nowakowski; Alex Wong	Contemporary	"November"—Max Richter	Travis Wall	Viewers
Jaja Vankova; Alex Wong	Contemporary	"Youth"—Daughter	Tessandra Chavez	Nigel Lythgoe
Jaja Vankova; Jim Nowakowski	Lyrical hip-hop	"No Woman, No Cry"—Bob Marley	Christopher Scott	Jaja Vankova
Gaby Diaz; Robert Roldan	Contemporary	"Angel"—Sarah McLachlan	Mandy Moore	Gaby Diaz

=== All-Stars Dance Pool ===
All-Stars, Contestant Partners, and Results
All Star				Contestant			
Season	Former Contestant	Dance Styles	Placement	Week 6	Week 7	Week 8	Week 9
3	Anya Garnis	Latin Ballroom	Top 12			Jim	
3	Jaimie Goodwin	Contemporary	Top 10	Edson	Derek		
4	Joshua Allen	Hip-hop	Winner	Gaby		Megz	Virgil
4	Comfort Fedoke	Hip-hop	Top 8	Virgil	Jim		
5	Brandon Bryant	Contemporary/Modern	Runner-up	Hailee			
5	Kayla Radomski	Contemporary	4th Place	Derek	Neptune		
7	Alex Wong	Ballet	8th Place	Jaja		Jaja	
7	Robert Roldan	Jazz	3rd Place		Gaby	Hailee	
8	Marko Germar	Lyrical Jazz	3rd Place	Megz		Gaby	Hailee
8	Melanie Moore	Contemporary	Winner			Virgil	
9	Cyrus "Glitch" Spencer	Animation	Male Runner-Up				Jaja
10	Jasmine Harper	Contemporary/Hip-hop	Female Runner-up	Neptune	Virgil		
10	Paul Karmiryan	Latin Ballroom	Top 6		Megz		
10	Dushant "Fik-Shun" Stegall	Hip-hop	Male Winner		Hailee		
11	Zack Everhart Jr.	Tap	4th Place				Gaby
11	Jessica Richens	Jazz	3rd Place	Jim			
11	Ricky Ubeda	Contemporary	Winner		Jaja		

This contestant was eliminated this week.
This contestant was in the bottom 4 this week.
This contestant won the competition.
This contestant runner-up.

== Ratings ==
=== U.S. Nielsen ratings ===
Show	Episode	First air date	Rating (18–49)	Share (18–49)	Viewers (millions)	Rank (timeslot)	Rank (night)	Rank (week)
1	Auditions #1: Memphis and Dallas	June 1, 2015	1.3	4	4.03	3	4	15
2	Auditions #2: Detroit	June 8, 2015	1.1	4	3.78	3 (tie)	3 (tie)	— (Note: This episode was not in the top 25 shows, and its exact rank has not been made available.)
3	Auditions #3: Los Angeles	June 15, 2015	1.3	4	4.27	3	3	16
4	Auditions #4: New York	June 22, 2015	0.9	3	3.31	3	5 (tie)	—
5	Vegas Callbacks #1	June 29, 2015	0.9	3	3.38	3 (tie)	5 (tie)	—
6	Vegas Callbacks #2 / Top 20 Chosen	July 6, 2015	1.0	4	3.43	3	3	23
7	Top 20 Perform	July 13, 2015	1.0	3	3.33	3 (tie)	4 (tie)	21
8	Top 20 Perform + Elimination	July 20, 2015	1.0	4	3.23	3	4	22
9	A Decade of Dance	July 21, 2015	0.8	3	2.48	2 (tie)	4 (tie)	—
10	Top 18 Perform + Elimination	July 27, 2015	0.8	3	2.85	4	7 (tie)	—
11	Top 16 Perform + Elimination	August 3, 2015	0.9	3	3.20	3 (tie)	4 (tie)	—
12	Top 14 Perform + Elimination	August 10, 2015	0.9	3	3.45	4	5 (tie)	—
13	Top 10 Perform + Elimination	August 17, 2015	0.9	3	3.18	3 (tie)	4 (tie)	—
14	Top 8 Perform + Elimination	August 24, 2015	0.9	3	3.04	3 (tie)	4 (tie)	—
15	Top 6 Perform + Elimination	August 31, 2015	0.8	3	2.94	4	6 (tie)	—
16	Finale Part 1: Top 4 Perform	September 7, 2015	0.7	2	2.64	4	8 (tie)	—
17	Finale Part 2: Winner Chosen	September 14, 2015	0.8	3	2.44	4	6 (tie)	—

== See also ==
- List of So You Think You Can Dance finalists
