= Tyce Diorio =

American dancer and choreographer

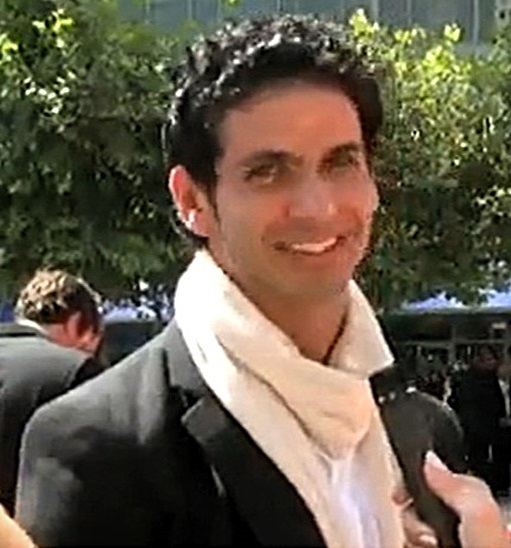
- Diorio in 2009
- Born: August 22, 1970 (age 56); Brooklyn, New York, US

Tyce Diorio (born August 22, 1970) is an American dancer and choreographer. He is best known for his work as a choreographer and guest judge on the Fox television series So You Think You Can Dance. He has choreographed and performed with Janet Jackson, Paula Abdul, Jennifer Lopez, Ricky Martin, and Taylor Swift. He won a Primetime Emmy Award for Outstanding Choreography in 2009 for his work on So You Think You Can Dance.

== Career ==
Early in his career Tyce Diorio was a finalist in the 1988 Star Search Finals as Keith Diorio. He was named "Mr. Dance of America" and performed in a contemporary take on The Nutcracker called "Nuts-n-Krackers" in Boston, Massachusetts, with dancer Nancy O'Meara, also a former "Miss Dance of America".

Diorio performed as a dancer in the 1995 film Showgirls, and in Robin Hood Men in Tights, listed in the credits as Keith Diorio. Diorio was a contestant on the short-lived talent show Fame in 2003. Diorio performed on Broadway in Fosse and Chicago, and in 2005 served as associate choreographer for the Broadway musical Good Vibrations. Diorio also had a cameo audition in Every Little Step (2008), a documentary about the 2006 Broadway revival of A Chorus Line.

Diorio appeared as a judge on the 2008 TLC dance competition series Master of Dance, where he was credited as Keith Diorio. He has also appeared as a choreographer and guest judge on the Fox television series So You Think You Can Dance.

In 2010, he played himself in the motion picture Move (directed by Kurt E. Soderling and Melinda Songer) along with others including Mia Michaels, Paula Abdul, Wade Robson and Nigel Lythgoe.

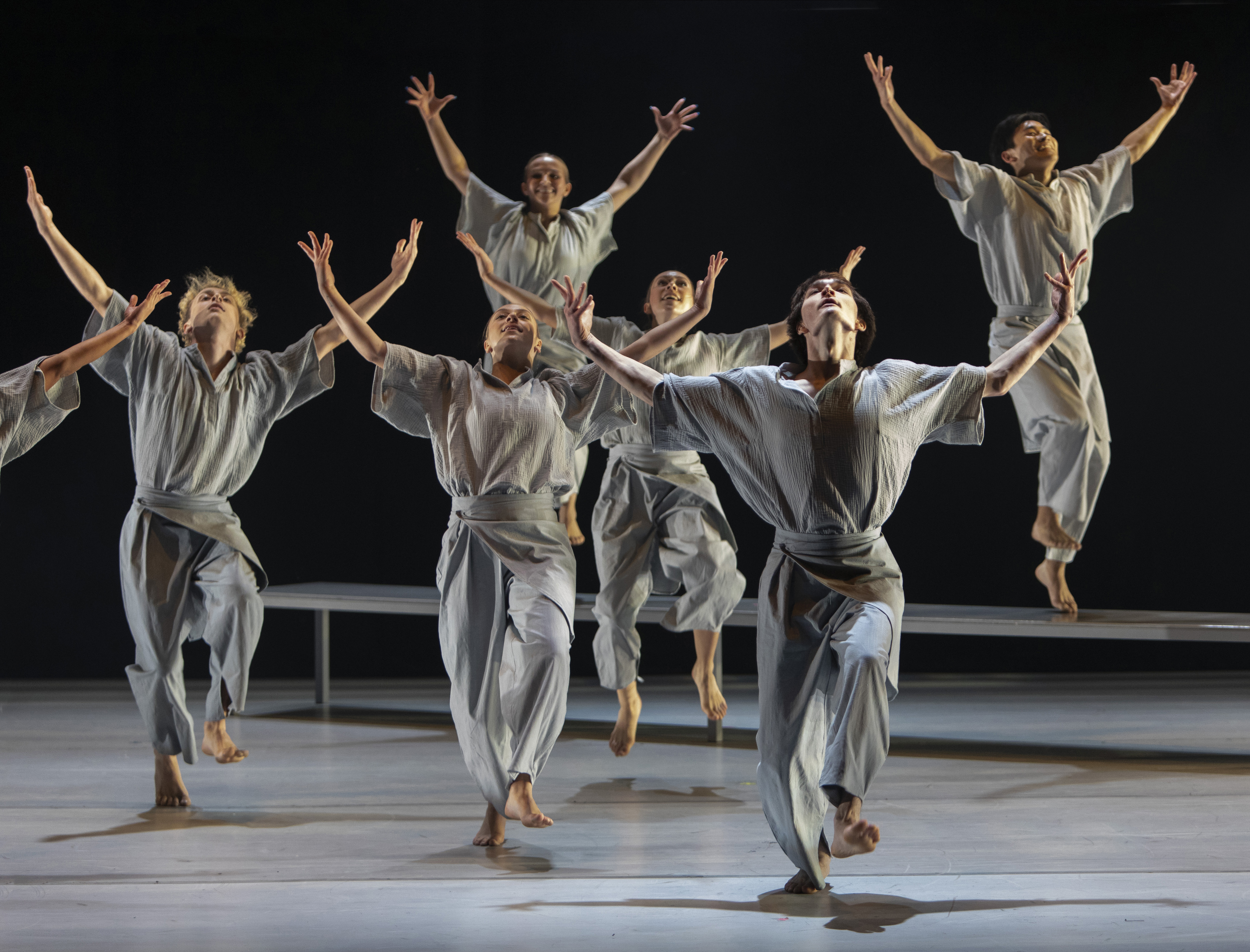
USC Glorya Kaufman School of Dance performing Balkan Beat Box by Tyce Diorio

Janet Jackson, Ricky Martin, Jennifer Lopez, Mýa, *NSYNC, Kelly Osbourne, Céline Dion and Toni Braxton are some of the artists Diorio has worked with. Diorio has also worked on numerous feature films including Robin Hood: Men in Tights, Showgirls, Starsky & Hutch, 13 Going on 30, Mr. & Mrs. Smith, and Epic Movie. In addition to So You Think You Can Dance, his television credits include That '70s Show, The Tyra Banks Show, The Academy Awards, The American Music Awards, The Billboard Music Awards, Big Time Rush, Fame, The Oprah Winfrey Show, as well as Annie and Cinderella. His struggle to be cast in the revival of A Chorus Line on Broadway was one of the stories included in the 2008 documentary Every Little Step.

Diorio has choreographed routines for Paulina Rubio and Tobey Maguire; commercials for iPod, McDonald's, Sylvania and Road Runner DSL; and a musical entitled Just Another Man. Diorio has worked privately with Katie Holmes and Maguire. He also choreographed the music videos for Paula Abdul's single "Dance Like There's No Tomorrow" and Taylor Swift's "Shake It Off". In 2017, he choreographed Swift's music video for "Look What You Made Me Do".

== Choreography for So You Think You Can Dance ==
Season	Week	Dancers	Style	Music
Season 1	Week 6	Melody Lacayanga; Nick Lazzarini	Broadway	"All That Jazz" from Chicago
Season 2	Week 1	Aleksandra Wojda; Jason Williams	Contemporary	"Unwritten"—Natasha Bedingfield
Season 2	Week 1	Martha Nichols; Travis Wall	Broadway	"Steam Heat"—The Pointer Sisters
Season 2	Week 5	Allison Holker; Ivan Koumaev	Contemporary	"Why"—Annie Lennox
Season 2	Week 5	Donyelle Jones; Benji Schwimmer	Broadway	"You Can't Stop the Beat" from Hairspray
Season 2	Week 6	Allison Holker; Ryan Rankine	Broadway	"Bye Bye Blackbird"—Liza Minnelli
Season 2	Week 6	Natalie Fotopoulos; Benji Schwimmer	Jazz	"Wonderful"—India.Arie
Season 2	Week 7	Natalie Fotopoulos; Ryan Rankine	Contemporary	"I Will Get There"—Boyz II Men
Season 2	Week 7	Heidi Groskreutz; Benji Schwimmer	Broadway	"Fake Your Way to the Top" from Dreamgirls
Season 2	Week 7	Top 8	Group routine	"Cell Block Tango" from Chicago
Season 2	Week 8	Natalie Fotopoulos; Ivan Koumaev	Contemporary	"Everytime We Touch (Yanou's Candlelight Mix)"—Cascada
Season 2	Week 8	Donyelle Jones; Benji Schwimmer	Broadway	"Le Jazz Hot"—Julie Andrews
Season 2	Week 9	Heidi Groskreutz; Donyelle Jones	Broadway	"Big Spender" from Sweet Charity
Season 3	Week 1	Shauna Noland; Jimmy Arguello	Broadway	"Ease On down the Road" from The Wiz
Season 3	Week 2	Jessi Peralta; Pasha Kovalev	Jazz	"Stiff Jazz"—dZihan & Kamien
Season 3	Week 2	Lacey Schwimmer; Kameron Bink	Broadway	"Overture/All That Jazz" from Chicago
Season 3	Week 3	Top 16	Group routine	"The Lioness Hunt" from The Lion King
Season 3	Week 4	Anya Garnis; Danny Tidwell	Contemporary	"Apologize"—OneRepublic
Season 3	Week 5	Jaimie Goodwin; Hokuto Konishi	Broadway	"Mr. Bojangles" from Fosse
Season 3	Week 6	Sabra Johnson; Kameron Bink	Contemporary	"Amazing Grace"—Crystal Lewis
Season 3	Week 7	Sabra Johnson; Pasha Kovalev	Broadway	"A Wild Wild Party" from The Wild Party
Season 3	Week 9	Top 4	Broadway	"Mein Herr"—Liza Minnelli
Season 4	Week 1	Kherington Payne; Stephen "Twitch" Boss	Broadway	"Too Darn Hot" from Kiss Me, Kate
Season 4	Week 2	Katee Shean; Joshua Allen	Broadway	"All for the Best" from Godspell
Season 4	Week 3	Comfort Fedoke; Chris Jarosz	Jazz	"The Beautiful People"—Marilyn Manson
Season 4	Week 4	Top 14	Group routine	"Money Money" from Cabaret
Season 4	Week 5	Chelsie Hightower; Mark Kanemura	Broadway	"I'm a Woman" from Smokey Joe's Cafe
Season 4	Week 5	Jessica King; William Wingfield	Contemporary	"Silence" from Unfaithful
Season 4	Week 6	Kherington Payne; Mark Kanemura	Jazz	"Canned Heat"—Jamiroquai
Season 4	Week 6	Katee Shean; William Wingfield	Broadway	"Sit Down, You're Rockin' the Boat" from Guys and Dolls
Season 4	Week 7	Katee Shean; Stephen "Twitch" Boss	Broadway	"Sweet Georgia Brown" from Bubbling Brown Sugar
Season 4	Week 8	Katee Shean; Joshua Allen	Contemporary	"All by Myself"—Celine Dion
Season 4	Week 9	Courtney Galiano; Katee Shean	Broadway	"The Trolley Song"—Rufus Wainwright
Season 5	Week 1	Asuka Kondoh; Vitolio Jeune	Broadway	"Hot Honey Rag" from Chicago
Season 5	Week 1	Randi Evans; Evan Kasprzak	Jazz	"I Only Have Eyes for You"—Jamie Cullum
Season 5	Week 3	Jeanine Mason; Phillip Chbeeb	Broadway	"Moses Supposes" from Singin' in the Rain
Season 5	Week 6	Melissa Sandvig; Brandon Bryant	Broadway	"Aquarius" from Hair
Season 5	Week 7	Melissa Sandvig; Ade Obayomi	Contemporary	"This Woman's Work"—Maxwell
Season 5	Week 7	Kayla Radomski; Jason Glover	Broadway	"Mr. Monotony"—Kim Criswell
Season 5	Week 8	Melissa Sandvig; Evan Kasprzak	Broadway	"Get Me To The Church On Time" - Matt Dusk
Season 5	Week 9	Kayla Radomski; Brandon Bryant	Broadway	"Bye Bye Love" from All That Jazz
Season 6	Week 1	Ashleigh Di Lello; Jakob Karr	Broadway	"Hit Me With a Hot Note (And Watch Me Bounce)" from Sophisticated Ladies

- Favorite routines:
  - Season 1:
    - Melody and Nick's Chicago "All That Jazz" Broadway routine ended up as Melody Lacayanga (runner-up)'s favourite routine she performed of the season.
  - Season 2:
    - Donyelle and Benji's Broadway routine to "You Can't Stop the Beat" from Hairspray was chosen to be Donyelle Jones (3rd place)'s favourite routine she performed of the season.
    - Allison and Ivan's contemporary routine to Annie Lennox's "Why" was contemporary choreographer Mia Michaels' favourite routine of the season.
    - Martha and Travis' Broadway routine to "Steam Heat" by The Pointer Sisters ended up as jazz choreographer Brian Friedman's favourite routine of the season.
  - Season 5:
    - Melissa and Ade's contemporary routine to Maxwell's "This Woman's Work" Mia Michaels' favorite routine of the season.
- Top 15 routines season 1-5 choreographies by Tyce Diorio:
  - Season 1:
    - Melody and Nick's Chicago "All That Jazz" Broadway routine
  - Season 2:
    - Allison and Ivan's contemporary routine to Annie Lennox's "Why"
  - Season 5:
    - Melissa and Ade's contemporary routine to "This Woman's Work" by Maxwell was chosen to be Nigel Lythgoe's favourite routine from all seasons 1-5

Dioro has choreographed for the Lifetime TV show, Drop Dead Diva, which featured Paula Abdul and some of SYTYCD past finalists including Mollee Gray(S6), William Wingfield(S4) & Joy Spears(S2).

He was also special guest choreographer in So You Think You Can Dance (Poland) (season 6) and So You Think You Can Dance (Ukraine) (season 4). He helped the judges to pick the top 14 dancers in both shows.
