= Travis Wall =

American dancer and choreographer

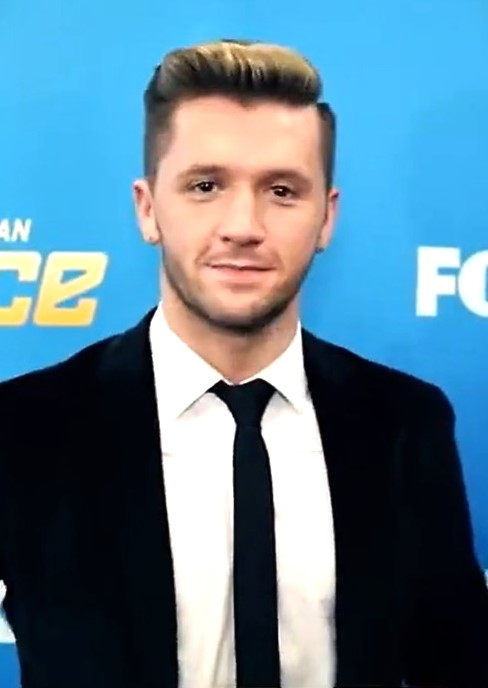
- Wall in 2013
- Born: Travis Michael Wall; September 16, 1987 (age 38); Virginia Beach, Virginia U.S.
- Occupations: Dancer, choreographer, instructor
- Known for: Runner-up on season two of So You Think You Can Dance, and choreographer on the show from 2011–present.
- Parent: Denise Wall (mother) John M. Wall (father)
- Relatives: Danny Tidwell (brother); Tyler Wall; T Scott Ross; Shannon Womble
- Website: traviswall.tv

Travis Michael Wall (born September 16, 1987) is an American dancer, instructor, and choreographer specializing in contemporary and jazz dance styles. He rose to international attention in 2006 as a competitor on the second season of the Fox television show So You Think You Can Dance. Wall received ten Primetime Emmy Award nominations for choreography between 2011 and 2020, winning in 2015 and 2017 for his work on So You Think You Can Dance. In 2012, he starred in the Oxygen reality show All the Right Moves, where he, Teddy Forance, Nick Lazzarini and Kyle Robinson launched their own dance company called Shaping Sound.

== Early life and background ==
I was born into the studio and all I really know is dance.

— Travis Wall

Wall was born and raised in Virginia Beach, Virginia. His mother, owner and operator of the eponymous Denise Wall's Dance Energy, recalls putting him in a walker and watching him imitate the dancers. He began dancing at the age of three, training at his mother's studio, and competing in a number of conventions.

== Career ==
=== Early career and training ===
His professional career officially started at the age of nine when he appeared in a Dr. Pepper commercial. In 1999, he won the Junior National Outstanding Dancer Scholarship Award. On April 27, 2001, at age 12, he started a two-year run in The Music Man on Broadway, playing a resident of River City/Winthrop Paroo understudy. This led to him performing at the 2000 New York City Dance Alliance's closing-night gala. In 2006, New York City Dance Alliance awarded Wall its Teen Outstanding Dancer of the Year award and he toured with the group for a year.

=== So You Think You Can Dance ===
In 2006, at the age of 18, Wall competed on the second season of the show So You Think You Can Dance (SYTYCD), making it to the final four contestants before placing second behind overall winner Benji Schwimmer. Wall was praised by the judges as the most technically talented dancer in the competition. Nigel Lythgoe and Adam Shankman have listed Wall, his brother Danny Tidwell, Season 4's Will Wingfield and Season 5's Kayla Radomski as the most talented dancers on the show, later adding Season 6's Billy Bell and Jakob Karr to that list.

While on the show, Wall danced in Mia Michaels' The Bench routine for which she later won an Emmy for Outstanding Choreography. During the Fall of 2006, Wall toured the United States with the top 10 dancers from the So You Think You Can Dance competition. He returned to the show in 2008 during the Season 4 auditions to teach choreography. He did a surprise audition on the 4th episode as "Danielle Chorizo".

On July 23, 2009, Wall returned to So You Think You Can Dance along with fellow Season 2 contestant Heidi Groskreutz on the 100th episode of the show, to perform the Emmy award-winning piece The Bench, choreographed by Mia Michaels.

Week	Partner	Style	Song	Choreographer(s)	Result
1	Martha Nichols	Broadway	"Steam Heat"— The Pointer Sisters	Tyce Diorio	Safe
2	Martha Nichols	Krump	"Clap Back"—Ja Rule	Lil' C	Safe
3	Martha Nichols	Hip-Hop	"Just Fine"—Chris Brown	Todd Sams	Safe
4	Martha Nichols	Salsa	"Tanga"—Machito and His Afro-Cubans	Ron Montez	Safe
5	Martha Nichols	Foxtrot	"Witchcraft"—Steve Tyrell	Jean-Marc Généreux	Bottom 3
5	Result Show Solo		""The Blower's Daughter"—Damien Rice		Safe
6	Heidi Groskreutz	Paso Doble	"The Plaza of Execution" from The Mask of Zorro	Mary Murphy	Safe
6	Heidi Groskreutz	Contemporary	"Calling You"—Celine Dion	Mia Michaels	Safe
6	Solo		"Belief"—Gavin DeGraw		Safe
7	Donyelle Jones	Hip Hop	"London Bridge"—Fergie	Shane Sparks	Bottom 4
7	Donyelle Jones	Quickstep	"Dancin' Fool"—Barry Manilow	Glenn Weiss	Bottom 4
7	Result Show Solo		"Gotta Get Thru This (Acoustic)"—Daniel Bedingfield		Safe
8	Heidi Groskreutz	Smooth Waltz	"Flying"—Cait Agus Sean	Ron Montez	Safe
8	Heidi Groskreutz	Afro Pop	"W'Happy Mama"—Zap Mama	Wade Robson	Safe
8	Solo		"You And Me"—Lifehouse		Safe
8	Results show solo		"Flying Without Wings (A Capella version)"—Westlife		Safe
9	Heidi Groskreutz	Disco	"Shake Your Groove Thing"—Peaches & Herb	Doriana Sanchez	Runner-Up
9	Benji Schwimmer	Hip Hop	"Gyrate"—Da Muzicianz feat. Mr. Collipark	Shane Sparks	Runner-Up
9	Donyelle Jones	Contemporary	"Georgia On My Mind"—Ray Charles	Mia Michaels	Runner-Up
9	Solo		"Konstantine"—Something Corporate		Runner-Up

=== Post-SYTYCD ===
Wall danced on the October 16, 2007 Dancing with the Stars results show, in a piece choreographed by and starring Wade Robson. Wall, along with Tidwell and many previous finalists of So You Think You Can Dance, performed during the second annual Idol Gives Back charity event on April 9, 2008. Nigel Lythgoe produced both shows at the time.

Wall performs regularly with American Dance Artists, in Delmarva, as well as for Evolution dance company in Los Angeles, California. He teaches students contemporary dance at NUVO, a dance convention that tours the nation. In 2007, Wall and Ivan Koumaev made a dance video called Its About Time designed to be for the viewer's entertainment rather than for instructional purposes like most dance videos.

Wall was in the 2008 Disney movie Bedtime Stories, starring Adam Sandler, alongside SYTYCD Season 3 contestant, Lacey Schwimmer. In 2010 Wall worked as an assistant choreographer for the Academy Awards, alongside Mia Michaels and Brian Friedman.

So You Think You Can Dance Get Fit: Cardio Funk was one of two home exercise videos released by the producers of SYTYCD. Wall choreographed a contemporary dance and corresponding cool-down routine for the video.

Wall choreographed and performed in an ensemble piece featuring New York City Ballet principal ballerina Tiler Peck to a piece by Nuttin' But Stringz for ABC's Dancing with the Stars April 13, 2010 episode in a feature called "Macy's Stars of Dance".

In 2010, Wall choreographed several numbers for the VMA's.

In 2011, Wall choreographed a floor exercise routine for Olympic All-Around Champion Nastia Liukin which she will use to try to earn a spot on the 2012 Olympic USA Gymnastics team.

Wall will be starring in a new reality show "All the Right Moves" with Teddy Forance, Nick Lazzarini, and Kyle Robinson. The four men are launching their own dance company called Shaping Sound.

Wall has appeared twice on RuPaul's Drag Race, first in the season 5 episode "Black Swan: Why It Gotta Be Black?" to choreograph a ballet based on the life of RuPaul, and later the season 11 episode "The Draglympics" to choreograph routines for an Olympics-like challenge. Wall also appeared on the RuPaul's Drag Race All Stars episode "All Stars Supergroup" in 2016.

Wall has appeared in two episodes of Dallas Cowboys Cheerleaders: Making the Team in seasons 13 and 14 to choreograph routines for the Dallas Cowboys Cheerleaders training camp candidates.

In 2018, Wall has appeared in a video against homophobia, dancing to This is me from The Greatest Showman while Shoshana Bean is singing.

In 2019, Wall choreographed the Off-Broadway musical "The Wrong Man" which debuted at the MCC theater, featuring Joshua Henry.

Wall was removed from the dance company Break the Floor (BTF) in 2021 after allegations that he had engaged in sexually inappropriate behavior. BTF said in a statement on Instagram that "Travis will not be traveling with BTF until we've had the opportunity for a third-party to look into these allegations." Wall has denied the accusations.

=== Choreography for So You Think You Can Dance ===
Wall earned 2011 and 2013 Emmy nominations for his contemporary choreography in seasons 7 and 9. He won a 2015 Emmy for routines he choreographed for season 11. (See SYTYCD Emmy Awards for details.) Along with Mandy Moore, he jointly won a 2017 Creative Emmy Award.

Season	Week	Dancers	Style	Song	Note
3	5	Jaimie Goodwin; Hokuto Konishi	Broadway	"Mr. Bojangles"—Fosse	by Tyce Diorio; Travis Wall assisting
5	6	Jeanine Mason; Jason Glover	Contemporary	"If It Kills Me"(The Casa Nova Sessions)—Jason Mraz	
5	7	Top 8	Jazz	"Let It Rock"—Kevin Rudolf feat. Lil Wayne	
6	1	Bianca Revels; Victor Smalley	Contemporary	"Wasted Time"—Me'shell Ndegeocello	
6	4	Ellenore Scott; Ryan Di Lello	Contemporary	"Your Ex-Lover Is Dead"—Stars	
6	7	Ellenore Scott; Jonathan "Legacy" Perez	Contemporary	"Machine Gun"—Portishead	
6	8	Ashleigh Di Lello; Ryan Di Lello	Contemporary	"I'm There Too"—Michelle Featherstone	
7	LVW	All dancers	Contemporary		"A Beautiful Mess"—Jason Mraz
7	MT11	Kent Boyd; Lauren Froderman; Mark Kanemura; Kathryn McCormick	Jazz	"Paris is Burning"—St. Vincent	
7	1	Adéchiké Torbert; Kathryn McCormick	Jazz	"Addicted to Love"—Florence and the Machine	
7	2	Ashley Galvan; Mark Kanemura	Jazz	"Wonderful"—Annie Lennox	
7	4	Lauren Froderman; Kent Boyd	Contemporary	"Collide" (acoustic version)—Howie Day	
7	5	Robert Roldan; Allison Holker	Contemporary	"Fix You"—Coldplay	
7	8	Kent Boyd; Neil Haskell	Contemporary	"How It Ends"—DeVotchKa	
8	LVW	All dancers	Contemporary	"Yellow"—Vitamin String Quartet	
8	MT20	Alexander Fost; Mitchell Kelly; Caitlynn Lawson; Ryan Ramirez; Ashley Rich	Contemporary	"Moth's Wings"—Passion Pit	
8	1	Sasha Mallory; Alexander Fost	Contemporary	"Stupid [Mark Bell mix]"—Sarah McLachlan	
8	1	Melanie Moore; Marko Germar	Contemporary	"Turn to stone"—Ingrid Michaelson	
8	5	Jordan Casanova; Tadd Gadduang	Contemporary	"Brotsjór"—Ólafur Arnalds	
8	5	Caitlynn Lawson; Mitchell Kelly	Jazz	"Piece of My Heart"—Janis Joplin	
8	8	Kent Boyd; Lauren Froderman	Contemporary	"Collide"—Howie Day	Guest Dancers
9	LVW	All Dancers	Contemporary	"I Won't Give Up"—Jason Mraz	
9	MT20	Top 10 girls	Contemporary	"Where the Light Gets In"—Sennen	
9	1	Audrey Case; Matthew Kazmierczak	Contemporary	"Unchained Melody"—The Righteous Brothers	
9	5	Witney Carson; Nick Lazzarini	Jazz	"Sing It Back"—Moloko	
9	5	Jaimie Goodwin; Cyrus "Glitch" Spencer	Contemporary	"Outro"—M83	
9	8	Eliana Girard; Alex Wong	Contemporary	"Without You"—Harry Nilsson	
10	1	Jasmine Mason; Alan Bersten	Contemporary	"Can't Help Falling in Love" (Live at Daytrotter)—Ingrid Michaelson	
10	1	Malece Miller; Jade Zuberi	Jazz	"Silver Screen Shower Scene"—Felix da Housecat	
10	4	Jenna Johnson; Tucker Knox	Contemporary	"Hangin' By a Thread"—Jann Arden	
10	7	Tucker Knox; Robert Roldan	Contemporary	"Medicine"—Daughter	
10	8	Amy Yakima; Travis Wall	Contemporary	"Wicked Game" (Live at Kilkenny Arts Festival, Ireland 2011)—James Vincent McMorrow	
10	10	Jasmine Harper; Fik-Shun	Contemporary	"Spiegel im Spiegel"—Arvo Pärt, performed by Angela Yoffe & Vadim Gluzman	
11	LVW	All Dancers	Contemporary	"Lay Me Down"—Sam Smith	
11	1	Emily James; Casey Askew	Contemporary	"All of Me"(Live from Spotify)—John Legend	
11	2	Valerie Rockey; Ricky Ubeda	Contemporary	"Oh Darling"—Gossling	
11	4	Bridget Whitman; Emilio Dosal	Contemporary	"The Leaving Song"—Chris Garneau	
11	4	Bridget Whitman; Carly Blaney; Jacque LeWarne; Jessica Richens; Marcquet Hill; Ricky Ubeda; Rudy Abreu; Teddy Coffey	Jazz	"Love Runs Out"—OneRepublic	
11	5	Jessica Richens; Casey Askew	Contemporary	"Like Real People Do"—Hozier	
11	5	Top 7 Guys	Contemporary	"Wave"—Beck	
11	6	Jacque LeWarne; Chehon Wespi-Tschopp	Contemporary ballet	"Adagio for TRON"—Daft Punk	
11	7	Ricky Ubeda; Jaimie Goodwin	Contemporary	"Smile"—Michael Jackson	with All-Star
11	9	Top 4	Contemporary	"Wind Beneath My Wings"—RyanDan	
11	9	Jessica Richens; Robert Roldan	Contemporary	"When I Go"—Over the Rhine	with All-Star
12	MT20	Kate Harpootlian Edson Juarez	Contemporary	"Shaped Like A Gun"—Tailor	
12	1	Team Stage	Contemporary	"Stabat Mater"—Woodkid	
12	3	Team Stage	Contemporary	"Beautiful Friends"—Helen Money	
12	5	Jaimie Goodwin Edson Juarez	Contemporary	"Your Day Will Come"—Son Lux	with All-Star
12	8	Gaby Diaz Hailee Payne	Contemporary	"Do Not Hang Your Head"—Elizabeth & the Catapult	
12	9	Jim Nowakowski Alex Wong	Contemporary	"November"—Max Richter	with All-Star
13: Next Gen	3	J.T. Church Robert Roldan	Contemporary	"The Mirror"—Alexandre Desplat	with All-Star
13: Next Gen	3	All-Stars	Contemporary	"Send in the Clowns"—from A Little Night Music (Sarah Vaughan and the Count Basie Orchestra)	
13: Next Gen	4	Tate McRae Kathryn McCormick	Contemporary	"She Used to Be Mine"—Sara Bareilles	with All-Star
13: Next Gen	5	Contestants and All-Stars	Contemporary	"What the World Needs Now is Love"—Hal David and Burt Bacharach (Will Young cover)	
13: Next Gen	5	Emma Hellencamp J.T. Church	Contemporary	"I Will Not Forget You"—Max Richter	with All-Star

=== Danced as Guest or All-Star for So You Think You Can Dance ===
Season	Week	partner(s)	Style	Song	Choreographer(s)	Note
4	9	Earlier contestants	Discoswing	"Don't Stop the Music"—Rihanna		as Guest
5	7 RS	Heidi Groskreutz	Contemporary	"Calling You"—Celine Dion	Mia Michaels	as Guest
10	8	Amy Yakima	Contemporary	"Wicked Game" (Live at Kilkenny Arts Festival, Ireland 2011)—James Vincent McMorrow	Travis Wall	as All-Star
13: Next Gen	6	Maddie Ziegler	Contemporary	"Cage of Bones"—Son Lux	Travis Wall	as Guest

=== Publications ===
In February 2007, Wall was featured in a fashion/dance spread in movmnt magazine (which Tidwell co-founded). The following June, Wall interviewed Whoopi Goldberg for the magazine.

Wall was featured in the photography book Moving Still: a Life Performance by David Benaym.

== Personal life ==
In 2007, his adoptive brother Danny Tidwell was a runner-up of the third season of So You Think You Can Dance. He, too, had trained with their mother Denise Wall, who also trained Jaimie Goodwin, a Season 3 contestant. Wall is gay. In March 2016, he got engaged to UCLA gymnastics coach Dom Palange after 5 years of dating. Wall announced the couple's split on his Instagram page on August 3, 2018.

== Filmography ==
Year	Media	Role	Notes
2006-2019	So You Think You Can Dance	Contestant, Choreographer, Dancer, Guest, All-Star	Runner-Up in Season 2. Choreographer in seasons 3, 5, 6, 7, 8, 9, 10, 11, 12, 12: Next Gen Guest in seasons 4, 5, 13: Next Gen. All-Star in Season 10
2007-2010	Dancing with the Stars	Dancer, Choreographer	Results Show, Season 5, October 16, 2007. Guest Dancer/Choreographer, Season 10, April 13, 2010.
2008	Bedtime Stories		
2010	82nd Academy Awards	Assistant Choreographer	
2010	2010 MTV Video Music Awards	Choreographer	
2013-2019	RuPaul's Drag Race	Himself (Choreographer and Guest Judge)	Episode: "Why It Gotta Be Black, Swan?" Episode: "Draglympics"
2018-2021	Dallas Cowboys Cheerleaders: Making the Team	Himself (Guest Choreographer)	Season 13, 14, 15, 16

== Awards ==
=== Primetime Emmy Awards ===
Year	Award	Performance	Result
2011	Outstanding Choreography	So You Think You Can Dance	Nominated
2012	Outstanding Choreography	Dancing with the Stars	Nominated
2013	Outstanding Choreography	So You Think You Can Dance	Nominated
2014	Outstanding Choreography	So You Think You Can Dance	Nominated
2015	Outstanding Choreography	So You Think You Can Dance	Won
2016	Outstanding Choreography	So You Think You Can Dance	Nominated
2017	Outstanding Choreography	So You Think You Can Dance	Won
2018	Outstanding Choreography	So You Think You Can Dance	Nominated
2019	Outstanding Choreography	So You Think You Can Dance	Nominated
2020	Outstanding Choreography	So You Think You Can Dance	Nominated
