= Nick Lazzarini =

American dancer (born 1984)

Nick Lazzarini (born August 4, 1984) is an American dancer. He is best known as the first season winner on the Fox reality show So You Think You Can Dance. He is a trained dancer in jazz, lyrical, hip hop, ballet and modern dance styles.

== Early life ==
My mom used to play a lot of music when I was a baby—I'd prop myself up on the coffee table and wiggle myself around.

— Nick Lazzarini, People magazine, October 2005

Lazzarini was born to Italian American parents. Lazzarini grew up in Mountain View, California in the San Francisco Bay Area. He graduated from Springer Elementary in Mountain View, California and Blach Intermediate School in Los Altos, California. Lazzarini began attending Showbiz when he was 8 years old. In the early 2000s, he travelled every other weekend from San Francisco to Fresno to dance at Dance Rage. He was trained under Keith Banks. His performance at Showbiz in 2001 caught the attention of Dance Spirit magazine, and they featured him on the cover of their October 2001 issue.

At the time of his appearance on So You Think You Can Dance, he was living in Van Nuys, California.

== Early career ==
Lazzarini has been dancing since age four and began teaching and doing choreography at age fourteen.

In 2003, Lazzarini, competing as part of a dance group called Hot Under The Collar, appeared on CBS' Star Search remake.

Prior to competing on the Fox reality show, Lazzarini spent two years at the Dance Company of San Francisco and also toured Europe with the RAW dance company, which was founded by choreographer Mia Michaels, one of the judges on "So You Think You Can Dance".

== So You Think You Can Dance ==
Lazzarini was the first person who auditioned for the show before it even began. Nigel and Bonnie Lythgoe approached him to see if he would be a good match for a show they were then planning. For his win on the first season of the show, Lazzarini received a cash prize of $100,000 and the use of a penthouse apartment in Manhattan for one year. According to judge Nigel Lythgoe, Lazzarini chose to exchange the value of the apartment for a cash equivalent.

Week	Partner	Choreographer(s)	Style	Song	Result
1	Kamilah Barrett	Blake Anthony; Marty Kudelka	Hip-Hop	"Touch"—Omarion	Safe
2	Michelle Brooke	Glenn Weiss	Quickstep	"It Don't Mean a Thing (If it Ain't Got That Swing)"—Geoff Love and his Orchestra	Bottom 3
2	Result Show Solo			"Storm"— Lifehouse	Safe
3	Kamilah Barrett	Doriana Sánchez	Disco	"You Make Me Feel (Mighty Real)"—Sylvester	Safe
4	Kamilah Barrett	Mary Murphy	Tango	"Tanguedia"—Prandi Sound Dance Orchestra	Safe
4	Kamilah Barrett	Doriana Sánchez	Pop	"I Drove All Night"—Celine Dion	Safe
5	Kamilah Barrett	Alex Da Silva	Mambo	"Mambo Cool"—Ernesto Marquez and his Orchestra	Safe
5	Kamilah Barrett	Mia Michaels	Contemporary	"King of Pain"—The Police	Safe
6	Melody Lacayanga	Tyce Diorio	Broadway	"All That Jazz"—Chicago	Safe
6	Melody Lacayanga	Brian Friedman	Disco	"Knock on Wood"—Amii Stewart	Safe
6	Top 6's Solo		Contemporary	"The First Time Ever I Saw Your Face"— Jeffrey Gaines	Safe
7	Melody Lacayanga	Mary Murphy	Paso Doble	"España cañí"—Boston Pops Orchestra	Winner
7	Jamile McGee	Dan Karaty	Hip-hop	"Young'n (Holla Back)"—Fabolous	Winner
7	Ashlé Dawson	Shane Sparks	Hip-hop	"Feel the Girl"—Ms. Jade	Winner
7	Top 4's Solo		Contemporary Jazz	"Pardon Me"— Incubus	Winner
8	Top 16	Shane Sparks	Hip-Hop	"Pump It"—The Black Eyed Peas	Winner

== Post SYTYCD ==
Lazzarini became the first person to appear on the cover of Dance Spirit twice, with the January 2006 issue. Beginning in March 2006, Lazzarini became a founding member (of 15) of the Evolution Dance Company, which debuted at the OC Pavilion in Santa Ana, California, alongside SYTYCD alumni Melody Lacayanga and Craig DeRosa. Choreographers in the company include Liz Imperio and Mia Michaels.

Lazzarini was formerly a faculty member of Jump Dance Convention (www.breakthefloor.com).

In November 2011, Oxygen Media announced that Lazzarini, along with fellow dancers Travis Wall, Teddy Forance and Kyle Robinson, is part of a series in development titled All the Right Moves. This docu-series follows the four dancers as they work to start a new dance company in LA called Shaping Sound. He is co-creator of Shaping Sound, a traveling dance company that was still active in 2017.

== Personal life ==
Lazzarini is best friends with Melody Lacayanga, and they have been since their teens. He is also best friends with dancer and choreographer Travis Wall, whom he has known since he was 9 years old. He was fired from the dance company Break the Floor for posting then removing a video of himself online masturbating.

== Awards and honors ==
- Junior Mr. Dance of America
- Teen Mr. Dance of America

== See also ==
- List of dancers

First	Winner of So You Think You Can Dance; 2005	Succeeded by Benji Schwimmer
