= Snejana Urbin =

Russian dancer

Snejana "Snow" Urbin (born in Siberia, Russia) is a dancer and choreographer.

At the age of three, Urbin had begun attending dance classes with her mother guiding her. Urbin specialized in Latin and Ballroom, Rhythm and Smooth styles of dancing and began competing at the age of five. Urbin won the Russian Juvenile Junior in Ballroom and Latin, after which she and her dance partner were invited to train in the U.S. for the Olympics.

In the U.S., she won the U.S. Youth Latin championship and competing in the Ohio State Ball, Manhattan Classic and Amateur Latin Championship. Urbin represented the United States at the World Latin DanceSport Championships on four occasions.

Urbin taught children in Rising Stars Academy, where she met Maksim Chmerkovskiy. The two became dance partners. Since 2007, Urbin has been consulting for Arthur Murray Dance Schools.

Urbin has appeared in music videos with Madonna, Shakira, and Justin Timberlake.

Snow Urbin appeared on Season 1 of Fox's So You Think You Can Dance. Urbin later appeared on ABC's Dancing With The Stars. 2013 Urbin choreographed for "Dancing With The Stars" in Panama.

Urbin is currently teaching in the United States and abroad.

== Filmography ==
- Dancing with Chicago Celebrities (2009, 2010, 2011,2012,2013,3014,2016,2017,2018) .... Judge
- Academy Award (Oscars 2008) .... Dancer
- "Enchanted" (2007), Disney Films .... Dancer
- Good Morning America (ABC) .... Herself
- Biography of Igor and Snow Regional Broadcasting ("Yugra") Siberia .... Herself
- Ostankino (Moscow National Broadcasting Company) .... Herself
- Ohio Star Ball (PBS) .... Herself
- USA Dancesport Championship (Nostalgia Net) .... Herself
- "So You Think You Can Dance" .... Herself (6 episodes, 2005–2006)
- Dancing With the Stars (Pro Dancer Competition) ... Herself

== Music videos ==
- Shakira & Wyclef Jean, Hips Don't Lie (Sony BMG Music Entertainment).
- Madonna, I'm Going To Tell You A Secret (Madonna/VH1).
- Justin Timberlake, what goes around comes around

== Stage ==
- Burn The Floor (lead dancer)
- Floor Play (Lead performer) Atlantic City, NJ (2006)
- Underground (David Holls), New York, NY (2004)
- Latin Fusion (2003)
