= Sandra Colton =

American dancer, singer, and actress

Sandra Lynn Colton (born July 27, 1978) is an American dancer, singer, and actress.

== Early life ==
Born in Des Moines, Iowa and raised in Millbrae, California and later in Las Vegas, Nevada, she is the younger of two sisters. First performing at age three, Sandra later became known as part of the tap dance duo, Colton and Colton, with her sister Christine Colton. The duo went on to win the 1992 Star Search Teen Dance Championship and performing as an opening act on the Las Vegas Strip. Colton and Colton opened for Bill Cosby and Lou Rawls and headlines at the Showboat Hotel & Casino in Atlantic City, New Jersey.

Colton went on to teach for the Cheerleading Association and attended the University of Oregon where she completed her Bachelor of Arts degree. She focused her studies away from dance and graduated with Honors from the Department of Sociology writing the thesis Biracial Identity Development. Sandra went on to pursue dance and was part of the world-famous Laker Girls 2002–2003 team. In 2005, Sandra burst into the spotlight once again as part of the Top 16 of the Premier Season of FOX's So You Think You Can Dance.

== Career ==
Launching her own publishing company in 2004, Pinstriped Publishing, Sandra has also created and trademarked her own brand called O.G. which stands for Original Girl. Her brand includes Original Girl Magazine and O.G. Style. Colton's released her debut album under Pink Pen Records in 2006, JUST DANCE, with the single "Sugar". She followed up this debut with an EP in 2008 with "I Can't Dance," with a music video premier on Yahoo! Music.

Colton went on to perform in music videos with musical artists Justin Timberlake, Snoop Dogg, Too Short, Katharine McPhee, Raphael Saadiq, and Chelo, and toured with Rihanna in 2007 and Katharine McPhee in 2008. She appeared in television shows Boston Legal, Viva Laughlin, MadTV, Dancing with the Stars (with Raphael Saadiq), The Tonight Show with Jay Leno (as background singer for both Paulina Rubio and Katharine McPhee) as well as the films Bring It On: All or Nothing and The Day The Earth Stood Still.

Colton launched Original Girl Magazine's first print issue in the Fall of 2008. O.G. is now distributed by Ingram Periodicals. Colton is the author of BOOK ME! How To Become A Successful Working Dancer In Hollywood! with foreword by Brian Friedman and has a Dance Blog called Dance 365 in addition to the 2009 premier of DANCE TRACK Magazine under the Pinstriped umbrella.

Colton is a member of SAG, ASCAP, and the Recording Academy, and is also an elected board member of the LA Chapter of AFTRA.
