= Jamile McGee =

American b-boy and hip hop dancer (born 1984)

- Born: August 2, 1984 (age 40); Columbus, Ohio, United States
- Website: www.jamilemcgee.com

Jamile McGee (born August 2, 1984, in Columbus, Ohio) is an American b-boy and hip hop dancer. He is also known by his dancing name 'Jamz'. Jamile performed on the first season of So You Think You Can Dance.

== Biography ==
Jamile began dancing at the age of 4. When he was younger, doctors diagnosed Jamile with Juvenile Rheumatoid Arthritis and predicted that he would most probably be wheel-chair bound for the rest of his life. He was trained at Wright State Dance Department in Dayton, Ohio in addition to several years of dance training in studios across the east coast, and utilizes a wide variety of dance styles. He moved to Baltimore, Maryland from Ohio and continued to dance. He works with the Headliners Competition as a judge and instructor for their National Championships and Legends Conventions.

He auditioned for So You Think You Can Dance in Silver Spring, Maryland and then went on to New York City to win a spot on the Fox reality show. He was eliminated, just before Nick Lazzarini and Melody Lacayanga.

He has since appeared in numerous music videos, including Nelly Furtado's "Maneater", Mariah Carey's "Pepsi Commercial", Chris Brown's "Gimme That", and Rihanna's "SOS". Recently performed on VH1 Diva's Salute to the Troops.

Jamile is the 3rd dancer in the remake of Bobby Brown's "Every Little Step" featuring Wayne Brady and Mike Tyson, which was released on Funny or Die on September 28, 2010. He was on tour with Wayne Brady since February 2009. He had been travelling with Wayne Brady, performing on his improv show in Africa, Europe, and other places around the world. He had been on tour in Las Vegas with Wayne Brady performing weekly until late 2010.
