= Martha Nichols =

American choreographer and dancer (born 1987)

- Born: July 14, 1987 (age 39)
- Notable work: Tilted
- Awards: Capezio A.C.E. Award

Martha Nichols (born 1987) is an American choreographer and dancer. She took first place in the Capezio A.C.E. Awards in 2016 for her work Tilted.

== Early life ==
Nichols was born on July 14, 1987, the daughter of Mary Jane Nichols. They lived in Brooklyn, NY, and moved to Raleigh, NC when Martha was eight years old. Martha studied dance under Christy Curtis at the Pierrette Sadler Danceurs Studio in Raleigh, and later at Curtis's own CC & Company Dance Complex. Nichols mother, Mary Jane, died of a heart attack on June 1, 2005, shortly after Martha graduated from Millbrook High School. She moved in with family friends after her mother's death. At the age of eighteen, she was a guest teacher, performer and choreographer at the Burlington Academy of Dance & Arts in Burlington, NC.

== Career ==
Nichols appeared on Season 2 of So You Think You Can Dance, which aired beginning in May 2006. She was one of approximately 2000 contestants who auditioned for the season, and was in the Top 20 who appeared on the program. A USA Today article about the show described her as a "contemporary/hip-hop contestant." One of the show's judges, Nigel Lythgoe said "I don't think Martha's got a problem with her career. She's got great sophistication." She was the sixth female contestant and in gender the sixth overall contestant to be eliminated, and went on to tour with the other Top 10 contestants after the season finale.

Following her stint on So You Think You Can Dance, Nichols spent two years dancing in Cirque du Soleil's production Criss Angel Believe. She also danced for a Gap commercial and Rihanna's "Diamonds" tour, and she danced and worked as an assistant choreographer on Madonna's Rebel Heart Tour. She danced in the 2016 musical film La La Land and appeared as the "Woman in Gold" in the 2017 film The Greatest Showman. She formed her own dance company, the Martha Nichols Dance Company in 2016.

Her short work Tilted won first place at the 2016 Capezio A.C.E. Awards, which earned her a $15,000 prize and a subsequent performance of her piece. Dance journalist Rachel Rizzuto described Tilted as "funky-fabulous." Nichols went on to choreograph a full-length work, The Wider Sun, which saw its debut at the Beverly O'Neill Theater in Long Beach, California in August 2017. The Wider Sun was her first major choreographic work.

She teaches at the Broadway Dance Center in New York City.

== Works ==
- Tilted (video)
- The Wider Sun, 2017

== See also ==
- Martha Nichols on So You Think You Can Dance
