= Ashlé Dawson =

American dancer

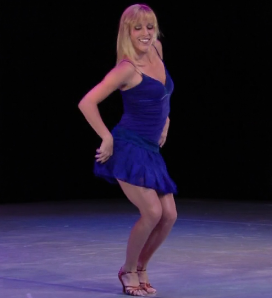
- Born: July 14, 1984 (age 42); Long Island, New York, U.S.
- Occupations: choreographer, director and dancer
- Known for: So You Think You Can Dance
- Website: Official website

Ashlé Dawson (born July 14, 1984) is an American choreographer, director, and dancer from Long Island, New York.

== Career ==
=== Profile ===
Dawson was a contestant on FOX's TV show So You Think You Can Dance, after teaching for ten years. She then performed and worked internationally while remained based in Los Angeles. She appeared in MTV's "MADE" (Season 10, Ep.39) in August 2010 and performed with the Cirque Du Soleil in 2011. As of 2011 Dawson was dancing with Prince Royce. She has appeared with Don Omar, Victor Manuelle, Gloria Estefan, Andre 3000, Zion, Mickey Rooney, Olga Tannon, Flex, Wisin y Yandel, Aventura, Fonseca, and Juelz Santana.

Dawson has performed and taught in Singapore, Colombia, Chile, Switzerland, Cyprus, Venezuela, El Salvador, Mexico, and all over South and Central America and Puerto Rico. She ranges from contemporary, lyrical, salsa, hip hop, jazz, African and Afro Cuban, reggaeton, waackin, popping, and other styles, and has a background in ballet.

Dawson is the director of Ashlé & Co., a pre-professional dance company based in NJ, and is also the Co-founder of "IF" The Intensive. She is currently a faculty member of Broadway Dance Center.

=== Awards ===
She is the winner of the International Miss Dance 2004 and the winner of best legs in the 2007 Dance Competition. In 2013 she won the "Mira Quien Baila" competition.

=== Filmography ===
- MTV's "MADE" Latin Dance Coach (Season 10, Ep.39)
- "So You Think You Can Dance" .... Herself (11 episodes, 2005–2006)
- "American Idol Gives Back" 2008
- "America's Got Talent" ......back up dancer Episodes top 40-4
- "Festival Viña Del Mar Live with Don Omar" Viña Del Mar, Chile
- "Step Up 2: The Streets"

=== Dance Festival ===
- 10th Annual New York International Salsa Congress
- Las Vegas Salsa Congress
- Los Angeles Salsa Congress
- Dubai International Dance Festival 2009.
- Festival De Mundial Salsa 2007 Cali, Colombia.
- Singapore Stomp The Yard Premiere Festival
- 1st Cyprus Salsa Festival
- Acapulco Salsa Congress
- Switzerland SalsaFest
- The Carnival: Choreographer’s Ball (Los Angeles)
- The Carnival: Choreographer’s Ball (New York City)
- Steps Performance Lab Showcase
- Big Apple Salsa Congress

=== DVD Appearances ===
- Salsa ... Solo! Step by Step Instruction for Beginners (2009)
