= Pasha Kovalev =

Russian dancer

- Па́ша Ковалёв
- Born: 19 January 1980 (age 46); Komsomolsk-on-Amur, Russian SFSR, Soviet Union (now Russia)
- Occupations: Latin and Ballroom dancer
- Years active: 2000–present
- Television: Strictly Come Dancing; Superstars of Dance; Dancing with the Stars; So You Think You Can Dance
- Height: 5 ft 11 in (180 cm)
- Spouse: Rachel Riley (m. 2019)
- Children: 2

Pavel "Pasha" Kovalev (Russian: Па́вел "Па́ша" Ковалёв; born 19 January 1980) is a Russian professional Latin and ballroom dancer.

Kovalev started dancing at the age of eight, and in 2000, moved to the United States with his professional dance partner Anya Garnis. In 2007, the couple competed on the third season of the American version of So You Think You Can Dance, and they have since participated in the eight subsequent seasons as either choreographers or All-Star partners to the contestants.

Between 2011 and 2012, Kovalev moved to the United Kingdom to take part in the BBC's Strictly Come Dancing as a professional dancer. After finishing runner-up on both the ninth and tenth series with celebrity partners Chelsee Healey and Kimberley Walsh, he went on to win series twelve with his partner Caroline Flack. Despite facing backlash over her past dance experience and landing in the bottom two three times, he and his celebrity partner, Ashley Roberts, eventually finished as runners-up on the sixteenth series, even becoming the highest scorers in the show’s history – with an average of 36.9 – and holding the record until the twenty-second series, when they were topped by Tasha Ghouri and Aljaž Škorjanec, who achieved an average of 37.3; they also broke the record for the most perfect scores – with a total of five – which they still hold. Kovalev announced that it was his final series on the show as he had decided to "go to the west end" after " 7 series ".

== Early life and competitive career ==
Kovalev began dancing at the age of eight. Until 2000, he competed with partner Anya Garnis in the Amateur Latin category in Russia.

After moving to the US, Kovalev and Garnis turned professional, and from 2002 started competing in the United States, the United Kingdom and Canada. Their competitive achievements include being finalists in the US Open from 2002 to 2006.

== So You Think You Can Dance ==
In 2007, Kovalev and Garnis auditioned for season 3 of the US reality show So You Think You Can Dance. Garnis made it to the Top 12 stage, whereas Kovalev made it all the way to the Semi-Finals. The pair have since participated in all following seasons as either choreographers or as All-Stars.

=== Season 3: Contestant ===
Although originally he only attended the audition to support Anya Garnis, he was asked to audition as well and together with Garnis became one of the 20 contestants chosen to compete in the show's third season from June to August 2007.

After making it all the way to the semi-finals, Kovalev was eliminated on 13 August, in the last round before the final, losing out to the two remaining male contestants, contemporary contestants Danny Tidwell and Neil Haskell. Sabra Johnson, the remaining female contemporary contestant, went on to win the competition. Kovalev and Garnis both later took part in the So You Think You Can Dance Tour.

Week	Partner	Style	Music	Choreographer(s)	Results
1	Jessi Peralta	Smooth Waltz	"Come Away With Me"— Norah Jones	Tony Meredith	Safe
2	Jessi Peralta	Jazz	"Stiff Jazz" – dZihan & Kamien	Tyce Diorio	Bottom Three
3	Jessi Peralta	Cha Cha	"Let's Get Loud" – Jennifer Lopez	Tony Meredith; Melanie LaPatin	Safe
4	Sara Von Gillern	West Coast Swing	"The Rockafeller Skank" – Fatboy Slim	Benji Schwimmer; Heidi Groskreutz	Safe
5	Sara Von Gillern	Jazz	"Body Language" – Queen	Mandy Moore	Safe
6	Lauren Gottlieb	Hip-Hop	"Fuego" – Pitbull	Shane Sparks	Safe
7	Sabra Johnson	Broadway	"A Wild Wild Party" – The Wild Party	Tyce Diorio	Safe
7	Sabra Johnson	Quickstep	"Mr Pinstripe Suit" – Big Bad Voodoo Daddy	Tony Meredith; Melanie LaPatin	Safe
8	Lacey Schwimmer	Hip-Hop	"In The Morning" – Junior Boys	Dave Scott	TOP SIX
8	Lacey Schwimmer	Smooth Waltz	"A Daisy in December" – Winifred Horan & Mick McAuley	Hunter Johnson	TOP SIX

=== Seasons 4–11: Choreographer ===
On Season 4, Kovalev assisted Mia Michaels on a Contemporary routine, and he and his partner Anya Garnis choreographed a Cha-Cha routine performed by Courtney Galiano and Gev Manoukian.

On Season 5, Kovalev and Garnis choreographed a Samba for Evan Kasprzak and Randi Evans.

On Season 6, he and Garnis returned to So You Think You Can Dance to lead the choreography rounds during the auditions, and later that season choreographed a Jive for Russell Ferguson and Mollee Gray.

Kovalev was announced as an "All-Star" for both Season 7 and Season 8 of the show, performing all the Latin and Ballroom dances with the female contestants, including winners Lauren Froderman and Melanie Moore.

For Season 9, the following year, he returned to choreograph a Cha-cha routine for contestants Janelle Issis and Dareian Kujawa on the third week of live shows.

Finally, on 16 July 2014, Kovalev returned with Garnis to choreograph a new Jive routine for contestants Bridget Whitman and Emilio Dosal during Season 11.

== Strictly Come Dancing ==
In September 2011, Kovalev joined BBC's Strictly Come Dancing as the new professional dancer of its ninth series, replacing Jared Murillo who had left after only one series with the BBC programme. He has since reached the finals three out of five series, finishing runner-up on his first and second series, and winning on his fourth.

=== Statistics and Strictly records ===
Kovalev was the second Strictly professional dancer to reach the finals four times (after Kevin Clifton) as the winner of Series 12 and the runner-up of Series 9, Series 10 and Series 16.

Along with his Series 12 partner, the late Caroline Flack, and Series 16 partner Ashley Roberts, Kovalev holds the record for the longest consecutive run of perfect scores, after scoring a 40 for each of their last four dances. Flack and Kovalev were also the first to receive a perfect score for all three of their dances in the final. With Roberts, Kovalev holds the record for most maximum scores of 40, by any couple, with five. Kovalev also holds the record for most perfect scores, with a total of 13.

Series	Celebrity partner	Dances	Highest	Lowest	10s	40s	Score average	Place
9	Chelsee Healey	16	40	27	18	1	35.25	2nd
10	Kimberley Walsh	15	40	26	20	3	34.60	2nd
11	Rachel Riley	6	30	20	0	0	25.33	11th
12	Caroline Flack	16	40	27	23	4	35.13	1st
13	Carol Kirkwood	7	22	13	0	0	18.00	10th
14	Naga Munchetty	4	25	23	0	0	23.75	12th
15	Chizzy Akudolu	2	21	16	0	0	18.50	15th
16	Ashley Roberts	16	40	29	32	5	36.94	2nd
TOTAL	—N/a	82	40	13	94	13	32.27	—N/a

Key

Winner of the series
Runner-up of the series
Non finalist
First elimination of the series
Participating

Kovalev has received the highest score in the history of Strictly Come Dancing for nine of the show's eighteen dance styles - eight of which except for the Rumba achieved perfect scores - and was the first Strictly professional dancer to receive a perfect score for the Paso Doble and also for the Tango. Furthermore, he has received a ten from at least one of the judges for all of the show's dance styles, except the Waltz.

The dance styles for which he holds the record for the highest score ever awarded are the Paso Doble and the Rumba, with Series 9 partner Chelsee Healey; the Charleston and the Tango, with Series 10 partner Kimberley Walsh; the Salsa, the Cha Cha Cha, the Charleston and the Showdance, with Series 12 partner Caroline Flack; and the Jive, the American Smooth, the Salsa, the Showdance and the Charleston with Series 16 partner Ashley Roberts. Kovalev and Walsh also received the only perfect score for the Series 10 Fusion dance, dancing to a mashup of the Cha Cha Cha and the Tango.

Highest and lowest scoring performances per dance

Dance	Partner	Highest	Partner	Lowest
American Smooth	Ashley Roberts	40	Carol Kirkwood	17
Argentine Tango	Caroline Flack	39	Chelsee Healey	35
Cha Cha Cha	Caroline Flack	40	Carol Kirkwood	16
Charleston	Kimberley Walsh; Caroline Flack; Ashley Roberts	40	Naga Munchetty	24
Contemporary	Ashley Roberts	39		
Foxtrot	Ashley Roberts	39	Chizzy Akudolu	16
Jive	Ashley Roberts	40	Kimberley Walsh	34
Paso Doble	Chelsee Healey	40	Rachel Riley; Carol Kirkwood	22
Quickstep	Chelsee Healey	39	Carol Kirkwood	17
Rumba	Chelsee Healey	39	Carol Kirkwood	13
Salsa	Caroline Flack; Ashley Roberts	40	Rachel Riley	20
Samba	Ashley Roberts	37	Caroline Flack	32
Showdance	Caroline Flack; Ashley Roberts	40	Chelsee Healey	36
Tango	Kimberley Walsh	40	Naga Munchetty	25
Viennese Waltz	Kimberley Walsh	39	Carol Kirkwood	21
Waltz	Caroline Flack	31	Naga Munchetty	23

- Scores earned on Christmas or any other specials are not included;
- Green and Red numbers indicate the scores that were the best and worst per dance in Strictly history;
- Kovalev received an additional perfect score (40) for a Fusion dance of the Cha Cha Cha and Tango with Series 10 partner Kimberley Walsh.

Number of tens received per dance between series 9 and 16

Dance	10s	Dance	10s	Dance	10s	Dance	10s	Dance	10s
American Smooth	11	Argentine Tango	3	Cha Cha Cha	4	Charleston	25	Foxtrot	7
Jive	15	Paso Doble	5	Quickstep	7	Rumba	3	Salsa	12
Samba	1	Showdance	15	Tango	4	Viennese Waltz	3	Waltz	0

- 10s earned on Christmas or any other specials are not included;
- Kovalev received 4 additional 10s for a Fusion dance of the Cha Cha Cha and Tango with Series 10 partner Kimberley Walsh.

All marks received per dance between series 9 and 16

Dance	10s	9s	8s	7s	6s	5s	4s	3s	2s	1s
American Smooth (danced 6 times)	7	6	4	3	0	2	1	1	0	0
Argentine Tango (danced 2 times)	3	4	1	0	0	0	0	0	0	0
Cha Cha Cha (danced 9 times)	4	0	6	12	7	3	3	0	1	0
Charleston (danced 7 times)	18	6	0	1	2	1	0	0	0	0
Contemporary (danced 1 time)	3	1	0	0	0	0	0	0	0	0
Foxtrot (danced 6 times)	4	6	2	2	3	3	3	1	0	0
Fusion* (danced 1 time)	4	0	0	0	0	0	0	0	0	0
Jive (danced 5 times)	11	7	2	0	0	0	0	0	0	0
Paso Doble (danced 6 times)	6	4	5	1	5	2	1	0	0	0
Quickstep (danced 7 times)	5	7	4	6	0	3	2	1	0	0
Rumba (danced 4 times)	3	10	3	0	0	0	2	1	1	0
Salsa (danced 6 times)	8	4	5	3	1	2	1	0	0	0
Samba (danced 4 times)	1	10	6	1	0	0	0	0	0	0
Showdance (danced 4 times)	11	5	0	0	0	0	0	0	0	0
Tango (danced 6 times)	4	3	9	6	1	1	0	0	0	0
Viennese Waltz (danced 5 times)	3	3	3	7	2	1	1	0	0	0
Waltz (danced 4 times)	0	0	3	7	5	1	0	0	0	0
TOTAL (66 dances)	96	78	51	48	19	19	14	4	2	0

- Marks earned on Christmas or any other specials are not included;
- * This style of dance was introduced for one series only and was performed as a mashup of the Cha Cha Cha and Tango on Week 10 of Series 10, receiving a perfect score from the judges.

=== Series 9: Chelsee Healey ===
In the ninth series, his first, Kovalev was partnered with Waterloo Road actress, Chelsee Healey.

The couple received the-then only perfect score ever awarded for the Paso Doble and made it all the way to the finals, finishing as runners-up to Harry Judd and his partner Aliona Vilani.

Week	Dance / Song	Judges' score					Result
Week	Dance / Song	Horwood	Goodman (Grey*)	Dixon	Tonioli	Total	Result
1	Waltz / "See the Day"	7	6	7	7	27	No Elimination
2	Salsa / "Higher"	7	7	8	7	29	Safe
3	Cha Cha Cha / "Beggin'"	6	8	8	8	30	Safe
4	Quickstep / "Sing Sing Sing"	9	9	9	9	36	Safe
5	Tango / "Love Potion No. 9"	7	8	9	8	32	Safe
6	Charleston / "Five Foot Two, Eyes of Blue"	9	9*	9	9	36	Safe
7	Foxtrot / "Doesn't Mean Anything"	9	8	10	9	36	Safe
8	Samba / "Spice Up Your Life"	8	9	9	9	35	Safe
9	Argentine Tango / "Una Musica Brutal"	8	9	9	9	35	Safe
9	Swing Marathon / "Chattanooga Choo Choo"	Awarded	6	Judges	Points	41	Safe
10	Jive / "I'm a Believer"	9	10	10	10	39	Safe
11	American Smooth / "Time After Time"	8	9	10	9	36	Safe
11	Paso Doble / "Malagueña"	10	10	10	10	40	Safe
12	Jive / "I'm a Believer"	9	10	10	10	39	RUNNERS UP
12	Showdance / "One Night Only"	9	9	9	9	36	RUNNERS UP
12	Rumba / "Because of You"	9	10	10	10	39	RUNNERS UP
12	Quickstep / "Sing Sing Sing"	9	10	10	10	39	RUNNERS UP

- Green number indicates Chelsee & Pasha were at the top of the leaderboard.
- Red number indicates Chelsee & Pasha were at the bottom of the leaderboard.

=== Series 10: Kimberley Walsh ===
For the tenth series, it was revealed that he would be dancing with Girls Aloud singer Kimberley Walsh.

The couple received the first perfect score ever awarded for the Tango and made it all the way to the finals, finishing as the runners-up to Olympic gymnast Louis Smith and his partner Flavia Cacace.

By coming second, Pasha became the first male professional dancer to reach two consecutive Strictly finals, and the third professional dancer to do so overall after Lilia Kopylova and Aliona Vilani.

Week	Dance / Song	Judges' score					Result
Week	Dance / Song	Horwood	Bussell	Goodman	Tonioli	Total	Result
1	Cha Cha Cha / "Domino"	7	7	7	7	28	No Elimination
2	Foxtrot / "Someone like You"	7	6	6	7	26	Safe
3	Quickstep / "Get Happy"	7	7	7	8	29	Safe
4	Paso Doble / "Hungry Like the Wolf"	8	8	7	8	31	Safe
5	Salsa / "Naughty Girl"	8	8	8	9	33	Safe
6	Viennese Waltz / "A Thousand Years"	8	8	9	9	34	Bottom Two
7	Samba / "Livin' la Vida Loca"	8	8	9	9	34	Safe
8	Tango / "When Doves Cry"	8	9	8	9	34	Safe
9	Jive / "Land of a Thousand Dances"	9	8	8	9	34	Safe
10	Cha Cha Cha & Tango Fusion / "It's Raining Men"	10	10	10	10	40	Safe
11	American Smooth / "Fever"	9	10	9	10	38	Safe
11	Charleston / "Those Magnificent Men in Their Flying Machines"	10	10	10	10	40	Safe
12	Viennese Waltz / "A Thousand Years"	9	10	10	10	39	RUNNERS UP
12	Showdance / "Crazy in Love"	9	10	10	10	39	RUNNERS UP
12	Tango / "When Doves Cry"	10	10	10	10	40	RUNNERS UP

- Green number indicates Kimberley & Pasha were at the top of the leaderboard

=== Series 11: Rachel Riley ===
For the eleventh series, Kovalev was partnered with Countdown & The Gadget Show co-presenter, and future wife, Rachel Riley.

During their time at the competition, the couple were never at the top or bottom of the leaderboard, and on Week 6, despite receiving their highest score of the series, they were eliminated after losing out in the dance-off to Abbey Clancy and Aljaž Skorjanec.

Week	Dance / Song	Judges' score					Result
Week	Dance / Song	Horwood	Bussell	Goodman	Tonioli	Total	Result
1	Waltz / "When I Need You"	6	7	7	7	27	No Elimination
2	Salsa / "Get Lucky"	4	5	6	5	20	Safe
3	Cha Cha Cha / "When Love Takes Over"	6	7	7	7	27	Safe
4	Quickstep / "Johnny Got a Boom Boom"	5	7	7	7	26	Bottom two
5	Paso Doble / "Maneater"	4	6	6	6	22	Safe
6	American Smooth / "I Put a Spell on You"	7	7	8	8	30	ELIMINATED

=== Series 12: Caroline Flack ===
For the twelfth series of the show in 2014, it was announced that Kovalev would partner former The Xtra Factor presenter, the late Caroline Flack.

The couple earned the first perfect 40 of the series for their salsa in the semi-finals, followed by an additional 3 in the finals giving them a perfect total of 120 points, a feat unmatched in the history of the competition. On 20 December 2014, the couple were crowned the champions of the series.

As the reigning Strictly champions, The couple performed their Salsa routine a second time during the launch show of Series 13.

Week	Dance / Song	Judges' score					Result
Week	Dance / Song	Horwood	Bussell	Goodman	Tonioli	Total	Result
1	Cha Cha Cha / "Can You Feel It"	6	7	7	7	27	No Elimination
2	Tango / "Blame"	7	7	7	8	29	Safe
3	Rumba / "I Don't Want to Miss a Thing"	8	8	8	9	33	Safe
4	Quickstep / "We Go Together"	8	8	9	8	33	Safe
5	Paso Doble / "Live and Let Die"	8	9	8	9	34	Safe
6	Samba / "Le Freak"	7	8	8	9	32	Safe
7	Waltz / "Three Times a Lady"	7	8	8	8	31	Bottom Two
8	Jive / "Crocodile Rock"	9	9	9	10	37	Safe
9	American Smooth / "Mack the Knife"	7	8	9	9	33	Safe
10	Charleston / "Istanbul"	9	10	10	10	39	Safe
11	Argentine Tango / "La Cumparsita"	9	10	10	10	39	Safe
11	Waltz-a-Thon / "The Last Waltz"	Awarded	3	Judges	Points	42	Safe
12	Foxtrot / "Diamonds"; Salsa / "María"	8; 10	9; 10	9; 10	9; 10	35; 40	Safe
13	Cha Cha Cha / "Can You Feel It"; Showdance / "Angels"; Charleston / "Istanbul"	10; 10; 10	10; 10; 10	10; 10; 10	10; 10; 10	40; 40; 40	WINNERS

- Green number indicates Caroline & Pasha were at the top of the leaderboard

=== Series 13: Carol Kirkwood ===
For the Thirteenth series of the show in 2015, Kovalev returned as the reigning Strictly champion, and was paired up with BBC Breakfast weather presenter Carol Kirkwood.

Although the couple regularly landed at the bottom of the leaderboard, they successfully made it seven weeks without ever being in the bottom two. Kirkwood also set a record for joint lowest scoring Rumba on the show, tied with previous contestant Fiona Phillips, with just thirteen points out of a possible forty. On their seventh and final week, they were eliminated by EastEnders's Kellie Bright and Kevin Clifton in the dance off.

Week	Dance / Song	Judges' score					Result
Week	Dance / Song	Horwood	Bussell	Goodman	Tonioli	Total	Result
1	Cha Cha Cha / "Thunder in My Heart"	2	5	5	4	16	No Elimination
2	Foxtrot / "It's a Lovely Day Today"	4	6	5	5	20	Safe
3	Quickstep / "I'm Gonna Wash That Man Right Outa My Hair"	3	5	5	4	17	Safe
4	Paso Doble / "España Cañí"	5	6	6	5	22	Safe
5	Viennese Waltz / "I've Been Loving You Too Long"	4	6	6	5	21	Safe
6	Rumba / "I Think I Love You"	2	4	4	3	13	Safe
7	American Smooth / "Man! I Feel Like a Woman!"	3	5	5	4	17	ELIMINATED

- Red number indicates Carol & Pasha were at the bottom of the leaderboard

=== Series 14: Naga Munchetty ===
For series fourteen, Kovalev was partnered with BBC news presenter Naga Munchetty. They were eliminated in week 4 against Anastacia and Brendan Cole in unanimous decision by the judges.

Week	Dance / Song	Judges' score					Result
Week	Dance / Song	Horwood	Bussell	Goodman	Tonioli	Total	Result
1	Waltz / "Run to You"	5	6	6	6	23	No Elimination
2	Cha-Cha-Cha / "A Fool in Love"	4	6	6	7	23	Safe
3	Tango / "Theme from Mission: Impossible"	5	6	7	7	25	Safe
4	Charleston / "Minnie the Mermaid"	5	6	7	6	24	Eliminated

=== Series 15: Chizzy Akudolu ===
For series fifteen, Kovalev was paired with British actress Chizzy Akudolu. They were the first couple eliminated after losing to Brian Conley and Amy Dowden in the first dance-off of the series, on 1 October 2017.

Week	Dance / Song	Judges' score					Result
Week	Dance / Song	Horwood	Bussell	Ballas	Tonioli	Total	Result
1	Cha-Cha-Cha / "Boogie Fever"	4	5	6	6	21	No Elimination
2	Foxtrot / "I'm a Woman"	3	5	4	4	16	Eliminated

=== Series 16: Ashley Roberts ===
For Series 16, Kovalev was partnered with former The Pussycat Dolls singer, Ashley Roberts. The couple went on to become the highest scoring couple of all time.

The pair matched Kovalev's previous record, set in 2014 with his former partner Series 12 winner the late Caroline Flack, of scoring perfect 40s for all three dances in the final. They also set the records of achieving the most 40s during a series, with five, as well as the-then highest average score in the history of the series with 36.94.

They finished as joint runners-ups to winners Stacey Dooley and Kevin Clifton.

Week	Dance / Song	Judges' score				Total	Result
Week	Dance / Song	Horwood	Bussell	Ballas	Tonioli	Total	Result
1	Viennese Waltz / "Perfect"	7	8	7	7	29	No Elimination
2	Cha-cha-cha / "Boogie Wonderland"	8	8	7	9	32	Safe
3	Salsa / "(I've Had) The Time of My Life"	8	9	9	9	35	Safe
4	Tango / "Look What You Made Me Do"	8	8	8	8	32	Safe
5	Rumba / "Something About The Way You Look Tonight"	9	9	9	9*	36	Safe
6	Charleston / "Witch Doctor"	9	10	10	10	39	Safe
7	Foxtrot / "Orange Coloured Sky"	9	10	10	10	39	Safe
8	Contemporary / "Unsteady"	9	10	10	10	39	Safe
9	Jive / "Shake a Tail Feather"	10	10	10	10	40	Safe
10	Samba / "Hot Hot Hot"; Lindy Hop-a-thon / "Do Your Thing"	8 Awarded	9; 7	9 extra	10 points	36; 44	Bottom two
11	Quickstep / "Don't Rain on My Parade"	9	10	9	10	38	Bottom two
12	Paso Doble / "Spectrum (Say My Name)"; American Smooth / "Ain't That a Kick in The Head"	9; 10	9; 10	9; 10	9; 10	36; 40	Bottom two
13	Salsa / "(I've Had) The Time of My Life"; Showdance / "Keeping Your Head Up"; Charleston / "Witch Doctor"	10; 10; 10	10; 10; 10	10; 10; 10	10; 10; 10	40; 40; 40	Runners-up

- Score awarded by guest judge Alfonso Ribeiro *

- Green number indicates Ashley & Pasha were at the top of the leaderboard

== Other television appearances ==
In 2008, Kovalev and Garnis appeared on the sixth season of Dancing with the Stars in a results show performance, dancing to "Come On Over" by Jessica Simpson.

In early 2009, he again performed with Garnis on the international dance show Superstars of Dance, representing Russia in the duet category, but they were then replaced by another couple in the 19 January episode.

In early 2010, the pair guest-choreographed for the third season of So You Think You Can Dance Australia.

On 4 January 2013, Kovalev guest starred in the music video of "One Day I'll Fly Away", the lead single of Centre Stage, his series 10 partner Kimberley Walsh's first solo album. Filming occurred on 4 January 2013 at Pinewood Studios, and the music video premiered on 17 January 2013. It features Walsh performing the song in different settings, until she is joined by Kovalev and they perform a ballet number.

In March 2013, ahead of Comic Relief's Red Nose Day 2013, comedian Miranda Hart took part in a Strictly Extravaganza, where she attempted to dance ballroom with Kovalev, as one of her five Miranda's Mad March challenges.

=== Strictly Come Dancing Children in Need Specials ===
On 18 November 2011, Kovalev took part in a Strictly BBC Newsreaders programme benefiting Children in Need, where he partnered with newsreader Emily Maitlis for a group dance.

In 2016, Kovalev was partnered with Olympic champion rower Helen Glover for the Strictly Come Dancing Children in Need Strictly Special, taking place on 18 November.

Year	Celebrity partner	Place
2011	Emily Maitlis	Non-winner
2016	Helen Glover	Non-winner
2017	Diane-Louise Jordan	Non-winner

Key

Winner of the special
Non winner
Participating

=== Sport Relief Does Strictly Come Dancing Specials ===
On 23 March 2012, Kovalev and his Strictly Series 9 partner Chelsee Healey took part in the Sport Relief 2012 Strictly Come Dancing Underwater special, in aid of Sport Relief, competing against winners Harry Judd and Aliona Vilani. After receiving even scores from the judges, the pair won the show due to head judge Len Goodman breaking the tie in their favour.

In 2014, during a Paralympian special for Sport Relief 2014, Kovalev was partnered with Paralympic gold medalist Hannah Cockroft. After performing a group dance with the other contestants, the couple was declared the winners by the judges.

Year	Celebrity partner	Place
2012	Chelsee Healey	Winners
2014	Hannah Cockroft	Winners

Key

Winner of the special
Non winner
Participating

=== Strictly Come Dancing Christmas Specials ===
In December 2012, Kovalev and Healey were partnered again for a Strictly Allstar group dance during the 2012 Strictly Come Dancing Christmas Special.

In December 2013, Kovalev was partnered with West End star Elaine Paige during the 2013 Strictly Christmas Special. The couple received a total of 39 points for their Cha-Cha, the highest score of the night, with only judge Len Goodman giving them a 9. They ultimately lost to comedian Rufus Hound after a vote by the studio audience.

In December 2015, the full lineup of the 2015 Christmas special featured six returning contestants, including four former champions, in a change to recent tradition. Kovalev was partnered with television and radio presenter Lisa Snowdon, who finished in third place in the sixth series of the show. The pair earned 37 points from the judges for a Quickstep to "Let It Snow!" but eventually lost to series 9 winner Harry Judd.

The celebrity lineup of the 2016 Christmas special, which like the previous year, featured six returning contestants, was announced on 7 November 2016. Kovalev was partnered with New Zealand writer and actress Pamela Stephenson and danced the Cha-Cha to "Jump" from the "Love Actually" soundtrack. The pair earned 39 points from the judges but lost to comedian Melvin Odoom.

The full line-up of the 2017 Christmas special, which features six returning contestants and their professional partners, was announced on 6 November 2017. Kovalev was partnered with ex-partner and Series 10 runner-up Kimberley Walsh and danced the Jive to "Run Rudolph Run". The pair earned 39 points from the judges, the highest score of the night, but lost to newscaster Katie Derham.

Year	Celebrity partner	Place
2013	Elaine Paige	Non winner
2015	Lisa Snowdon	Non winner
2016	Pamela Stephenson	Non winner
2017	Kimberley Walsh	Non winner

Key

Winner of the special
Non winner
Participating

Performances and judges' scores

Year	Celebrity Partner	Dance / Song	Judges' score					Result
Year	Celebrity Partner	Dance / Song	Horwood	Bussell	Goodmam/Ballas	Tonioli	Total	Result
2013	Elaine Paige	Cha-Cha / "Jingle Bells"	10	10	9	10	39	NON WINNERS
2015	Lisa Snowdon	Quickstep / "Let It Snow!"	9	9	9	10	37	NON WINNERS
2016	Pamela Stephenson	Cha-Cha / "Jump"	9	10	10	10	39	NON WINNERS
2017	Kimberley Walsh	Jive / "Run Rudolph Run"	9	10	10	10	39	NON WINNERS

- Green number indicates the couple was at the top of the judges' leaderboard.

== Stage work ==
=== Burn the Floor ===
In August 2009, Kovalev and his partner Garnis joined the cast of Jason Gilkison's production Burn the Floor, one of the leading ballroom based shows in the world, during its stint on Broadway. The pair succeed departing Dancing with the Stars performers Maksim Chmerkovskiy and Karina Smirnoff.

Later in 2010, the pair joined the touring company of the show from 7 September to 28 November. Kovalev left the show in the summer of 2011 to join the BBC's Strictly Come Dancing.

== Personal life ==
Kovalev and professional partner Anya Garnis started dating as teenagers after meeting in dance class in Siberia. In 2000, the couple moved to the United States together.

Kovalev is against the Russian invasion of Ukraine and supports peace between the two countries.

Kovalev started dating his former Strictly partner Rachel Riley in 2013, and the couple now live together. In May 2019, Riley and Kovalev announced via social media that they were expecting their first child in December. The couple subsequently married in Las Vegas on 28 June 2019. Their daughter was born on 15 December 2019. They had their second daughter on 5 November 2021.

== Live tours ==
=== 2007: So You Think You Can Dance Live tour ===
In 2007, Kovalev headlined the So You Think You Can Dance Season 3 Live Tour, along with the other Top 10 contestants, visiting 50 cities in the United States.

Although eliminated in the Top 12 stage of the competition, his professional partner Anya Garnis was invited to take part as an alternate performer. The pair were able to perform together on the tour due to dancer Lacey Schwimmer needing a replacement in some of her routines because of an injury to her meniscus.

=== 2012–2013: Strictly Come Dancing Live! ===
Kovalev took part in the Strictly Come Dancing Live! 2012 Tour with his celebrity partner Chelsee Healey from 20 January to 26 February, and was partnered with Series 10 finalist Dani Harmer on the 2013 Tour, starting 18 January 2013.

He didn't take part in the 2014 Tour with partner Rachel Riley, and the following year, he opted to focus on his own tour, with Tristan MacManus stepping in to partner with the late Caroline Flack during the 2015 Tour.

=== 2012–2014: An evening with Katya and Pasha ===
Kovalev formed a new professional partnership with fellow Strictly professional Katya Virshilas. With their show An evening with Katya and Pasha, they toured the UK from 27 March to 6 May 2012.

The couple reprised the tour in 2013, and finally in 2014.

=== 2015: Life Through Dance ===
Beginning March 2015, Kovalev performed throughout Britain, with original partner Anya Garnis as his special guest, on his Life Through Dance Tour.

=== 2016: It's All About You ===
Kovalev announced his 2016 It's All About You tour, including 74 shows from 18 March to 12 June. Professional partner Anya Garnis guest starred once again.

=== 2020: Dancing With The Stars Weekend ===
Kovalev announced his appearance at Dancing With The Stars Weekend Friday 24th – Sunday 26 April 2020 at Celtic Manor Resort Hotel.

Awards and achievements
Preceded by Abbey Clancy and Aljaž Skorjanec	Strictly Come Dancing Champion (with partner Caroline Flack); Series 12 (2014)	Succeeded by Jay McGuiness and Aliona Vilani
Preceded by Chelsee Healey & Pasha Kovalev	Strictly Come Dancing Runner-Up (with partner Kimberley Walsh); Series 10 (2012)	Succeeded by Susanna Reid & Kevin Clifton; Natalie Gumede & Artem Chigvintsev
Preceded by Matt Baker & Aliona Vilani	Strictly Come Dancing Runner-Up (with partner Chelsee Healey); Series 9 (2011)	Succeeded by Kimberley Walsh & Pasha Kovalev; Denise van Outen & James Jordan
