= So You Think You Can Dance (American TV series) season 3 =

Season of television series

So You Think You Can Dance
- Season 3
- Hosted by: Cat Deeley
- Judges: Nigel Lythgoe; Mary Murphy
- Winner: Sabra Johnson
- Runner-up: Danny Tidwell

Release
- Original network: Fox
- Original release: May 24 – August 16, 2007

Season chronology
- ← Previous; Season 2 Next → Season 4

So You Think You Can Dance is an American reality television program and dance competition airing on the Fox network. Season three premiered May 24, 2007.

Cat Deeley returned for her second consecutive season as host. Nigel Lythgoe returned as a permanent judge, joined this season by choreographer Mary Murphy. The remaining third—and during Vegas Week, fourth—judging spot was filled by a guest judge (see main article).

== Auditions ==
Open auditions were held in the following locations:

Audition Venue	City	Date	Guest Judges(s)
Manhattan Center Theatre	New York City, New York	March 1–3, 2007	Dan Karaty
Chicago Theatre	Chicago, Illinois	March 8–10, 2007	Shane Sparks
Orpheum Theatre	Los Angeles, California	March 22–24, 2007	Wade Robson
Fox Theatre	Atlanta, Georgia	April 5–7, 2007	Shane Sparks

=== Vegas week ===
As in the previous season, those making the cut moved on to an intensive week of dance training in Las Vegas, Nevada. This season, Vegas week included hip-hop choreography taught by Shane Sparks, samba choreography taught by Mary Murphy with assistance from season two contestant Dmitry Chaplin, and contemporary choreography taught by Mia Michaels. The contestants that survived the cuts following those rounds were divided into groups, asked to randomly select from a box a CD containing one of five possible music types, and choreograph a routine to the song on their chosen disk. The contestants remaining after the group choreography round were asked to perform one last solo, following which the group was whittled down to 34 contestants—each gender: 17 female, 17 male. From this 34, the judges chose their top 20.

Contestant(s)	Task/style	Music	Choreographer(s)
All	Hip-hop	"Last Night"—Diddy feat. Keyshia Cole	Shane Sparks
All	Samba	"Baila, Baila"—Angela Via	Mary Murphy with Dmitry Chaplin
All	Contemporary	"I Miss You"—Vitamin String Quartet	Mia Michaels
Groups	Chosen out of a hat		Groups
All (individual)	Solo	Individual songs chosen by contestant	The contestant

== Studio Shows ==
=== Format ===
As in season 2, the studio shows began with 20 contestants, ten female and ten male. After partners are assigned, couples pick a dance style out of a hat, are rehearsed by a choreographer, and perform their routine, which is taped two days prior to airing. Following the airing of the performances, home viewers vote for their favorite couple. The bottom three couples (six contestants overall) are then liable for elimination by the judges on the live, or broadcast on tape delay in the western United States, results show. All six contestants perform a solo, after which the judges eliminate one female and one male contestant. If the eliminated contestants are not from the same couple, their respective partners form a new pair for the following week's performances. Once the field of contestants is narrowed down to the top 10, permanent partnerships dissolve and contestants draw their new partners from a hat each week. The judges no longer have any say in the elimination process; viewers call in to vote for their favorite individual contestant, and the female and male with the lowest number of votes are eliminated each week.

=== Recurring theme ===
Mary Murphy's loud, high pitched scream, reserved for performances she liked best, made a reappearance this season, along with the added element of the "hot tamale train", which can make the viewers have the ability to keep dancers safe from elimination. On the first performance show, Murphy enjoyed Anya Garnis and Danny Tidwell's jive performance so much, she made a metaphor of a "hot tamale train" having "just pulled up and let Anya off the train, special delivery." Two weeks later, she gave Sabra Johnson and Dominic Sandoval "two tickets on the hot tamale train" for their outstanding rumba performance. The phrase was regularly referred to by Murphy throughout the rest of the season, sometimes with an added distinction of being in "first class" for truly extraordinary routines. On the week before the final performance show, she brought the metaphor to a close by noting that the "hot tamale train was entering finale station."

=== Controversy ===
The sixth week of competition marked controversy surrounding Emmy-nominated choreographers Wade Robson and Mia Michaels.

The controversy regarding Wade Robson was due to the anti-war solo routine he created for the top 10 contestants. His choreography was meant to be a dance promoting peace, but was considered by some viewers as a political statement against the Iraq War. The dancers wore T-shirts on which they painted words of their own choosing, such as "compassion", "understanding", "unity", and "peace." The following night, Nigel Lythgoe addressed the controversy by stating that the choreography was not in any way meant to be against the troops fighting in the war. He did not wish anyone to be offended by a routine that had words such as "peace" and "compassion" in it. To make light of the moment, Lythgoe joked that he was more upset to have seen the same routine ten times.

The controversy surrounding Mia Michaels was regarding a jacket she wore during the performance show. The garment was a United States Marine Corps Blue Dress jacket with red piping, which only enlisted Marines are able to wear. In addition, a Marine Corps rank insignia was sewn upside-down and in the wrong location on the sleeve. Michaels addressed this by apologizing and stating that a friend of hers had given her the jacket, and that she wore it as a fashion statement, noting that she had no idea of its tradition or that it would offend anyone.

=== Top 20 Contestants ===
==== Female Contestants ====
Contestant	Age	Home Town	Dance Style	Elimination date	Placement
Sabra Johnson	19	Provo, Utah (originally from Netherlands)	Contemporary	August 16, 2007	Winner
Lacey Schwimmer	18	San Diego, California	Swing	August 16, 2007	4th Place
Lauren Gottlieb	18	Scottsdale, Arizona	Contemporary/Hip-Hop	August 13, 2007	Top 6
Sara Von Gillern	20	Rockford, Illinois	Breakdance	August 2, 2007	Top 8
Jaimie Goodwin	19	Virginia Beach, Virginia	Contemporary	July 26, 2007	Top 10
Anya Garnis	25	Queens, New York (originally from Russia)	Latin Ballroom	July 19, 2007	Top 12
Shauna Noland	18	San Jose, California	Contemporary	July 12, 2007	Top 14
Jessica "Jessi" Peralta	25	Ocala, Florida	Contemporary/Hip Hop	June 28, 2007	Top 16
Faina Savich	21	Brooklyn, New York	Latin Ballroom	June 21, 2007	Top 18
Ashlee Langas	19	Tyler, Texas	Contemporary	June 14, 2007	Top 20

==== Male Contestants ====
Contestant	Age	Home Town	Dance Style	Elimination date	Placement
Danny Tidwell †	22	Norfolk, Virginia	Contemporary	August 16, 2007	Runner Up
Neil Haskell	20	Buffalo, New York	Contemporary	August 16, 2007	3rd Place
Pasha Kovalev	27	Wyckoff, New Jersey (originally from Russia)	Ballroom	August 13, 2007	Top 6
Dominic “D-Trix” Sandoval	21	Sacramento, California	Breakdance	August 2, 2007	Top 8
Kameron Bink	20	Ocala, Florida	Contemporary/Hip Hop	July 26, 2007	Top 10
Hokuto “Hok” Konishi	22	Tokyo, Japan	Breakdance	July 19, 2007	Top 12
Cedric Gardner	22	Milwaukee, Wisconsin	Hip Hop	July 12, 2007	Top 14
Jesús Solorio	23	Pasadena, California	Contemporary	June 28, 2007	Top 16
Jimmy Arguello	20	Miami, Florida	Contemporary	June 21, 2007	Top 18
Ricky Palomino	25	Phoenix, Arizona	Contemporary	June 14, 2007	Top 20

=== Elimination chart ===
The song played for the female contestants' elimination was Ryan Cabrera's "I Will Remember You". The song played for the male contestants' elimination was Audio Adrenaline's "Goodbye".

Contestants are in reverse chronological order of elimination.

Legend
Female	Male	Bottom 3 couples	Bottom 4 contestants

Week:	6/14	6/21	6/28	7/12	7/19	7/26	8/2	8/13²	8/16
Contestant	Result								
Sabra Johnson	Btm 3								Winner
Danny Tidwell			Btm 3	Btm 3	Btm 3				Runner-up
Neil Haskell			Btm 3		Btm 3		Btm 4		3rd place
Lacey Schwimmer									4th place
Pasha Kovalev		Btm 3						Elim	
Lauren Gottlieb			Btm 3		Btm 3	Btm 4	Btm 4	Elim	
Dominic “D-Trix” Sandoval	Btm 3					Btm 4	Elim		
Sara Von Gillern			Btm 3				Elim		
Kameron Bink						Elim			
Jaimie Goodwin				Btm 3	Btm 3	Elim			
Hok Konishi				Btm 3	Elim				
Anya Garnis			Btm 3	Btm 3	Elim				
Cedric Gardner	Btm 3	Btm 3		Elim					
Shauna Noland		Btm 3		Elim					
Jesús Solorio			Elim						
Jessi Peralta		Btm 3	Elim¹						
Jimmy Arguello		Elim							
Faina Savich	Btm 3	Elim							
Ricky Palomino	Elim								
Ashlee Langas	Elim								

¹ Because Jessi Peralta was unable to participate in the performance show, she had to perform a solo despite not technically being in the bottom three couples.

² Because Fox aired NFL coverage during the regular Thursday time slot, the results broadcast was pre-recorded and moved to the following Monday. In order to keep the results from leaking before the airing, the audience and nonessential crew were asked to leave the studio, which was locked down, before eliminations were announced.

=== Performances ===
==== Week 1 (June 13, 2007) ====
Judges: Nigel Lythgoe, Mary Murphy and Dan Karaty

- Couple dances:

Couple	Style	Music	Choreographer(s)	Results
Jaimie Goodwin; Hokuto Konishi	Hip-Hop	"Tambourine"—Eve	Shane Sparks	Safe
Anya Garnis; Danny Tidwell	Jive	"Girlfriend"—Avril Lavigne	Tony Meredith; Melanie LaPatin	Safe
Lacey Schwimmer; Kameron Bink	Contemporary	"Dancing"—Elisa	Mia Michaels	Safe
Sabra Johnson; Dominic “D-Trix” Sandoval	Disco	"No More Tears (Enough Is Enough)"—Donna Summer & Westlife	Doriana Sanchez	Bottom 3
Ashlee Langas; Ricky Palomino	Argentine Tango	"Sentimiento Tango"—Trio Federico-Berlingieri	Alex Da Silva	Both eliminated
Sara Von Gillern; Jesús Solorio	Pop-Jazz	"Cabaret Hoover" from The Triplets of Belleville (Les Triplettes de Belleville)	Wade Robson	Safe
Jessi Peralta; Pasha Kovalev	Smooth Waltz	"Come Away With Me"—Norah Jones	Tony Meredith	Safe
Faina Savich; Cedric Gardner	Hip-Hop	"Get It Shawty"—Lloyd	Shane Sparks	Bottom 3
Lauren Gottlieb; Neil Haskell	Salsa	"Friday Night Rhythm"—Mazerati 5	Alex Da Silva	Safe
Shauna Noland; Jimmy Arguello	Broadway	"Ease On down the Road" from The Wiz	Tyce Diorio	Safe

==== Week 2 (June 20, 2007) ====
Judges: Nigel Lythgoe, Mary Murphy and Mia Michaels

- Couple dances:

Couple	Style	Music	Choreographer(s)	Result(s)
Lauren Gottlieb; Neil Haskell	Hip-Hop	"The Way I Are"—Timbaland feat. Keri Hilson and D.O.E.	Dave Scott	Safe
Jessi Peralta; Pasha Kovalev	Jazz	"Stiff Jazz"—dZihan & Kamien	Tyce Diorio	Bottom 3
Jaimie Goodwin; Hokuto Konishi	Samba	"Bang Bang to the Rock 'n' Roll"—Gabin	Jean-Marc Généreux; France Mousseau	Safe
Sabra Johnson; Dominic “D-Trix” Sandoval	Contemporary	"I'll Stand by You"—The Pretenders	Mandy Moore	Safe
Faina Savich; Cedric Gardner	Foxtrot	"You're the Boss"—Elvis Presley & Ann-Margret	Hunter Johnson	Faina Savich eliminated
Lacey Schwimmer; Kameron Bink	Broadway	"Overture/All That Jazz" from Chicago	Tyce Diorio	Safe
Anya Garnis; Danny Tidwell	Viennese Waltz	"You and Me"—Lifehouse	Hunter and Cyndi Johnson	Safe
Shauna Noland; Jimmy Arguello	Hip-Hop	"U Sexy Girl"—Fat Man Scoop feat. Elephant Man and Jabba	Dave Scott	Jimmy Arguello eliminated
Sara Von Gillern; Jesús Solorio	Paso Doble	"We Will Rock You (bonus remix)"—Queen	Jean-Marc Généreux; France Mousseau	Safe

==== Week 3 (June 27, 2007) ====
Judges: Nigel Lythgoe, Mary Murphy and Debbie Allen

- Couple dances:

Couple	Style	Music	Choreographer(s)	Result(s)
Sara Von Gillern; Jesús Solorio	Krump	"It's Okay (One Blood)"—The Game	Lil' C	Jesús Solorio eliminated
Shauna Noland; Cedric Gardner	Contemporary	"I Thought We Had"—The Family Stand	Mia Michaels	Safe
Lacey Schwimmer; Kameron Bink	Quickstep	"Big and Bad"—Big Bad Voodoo Daddy	Tony Meredith; Melanie LaPatin	Safe
Anya Garnis; Danny Tidwell	Hip-Hop	"Oh Timbaland"—Timbaland	Dan Karaty; Mandy Moore assisting	Bottom 3
Sabra Johnson; Dominic “D-Trix” Sandoval	Rumba	"Stickwitu"—The Pussycat Dolls	Jean-Marc Généreux; France Mousseau	Safe
Lauren Gottlieb; Neil Haskell	Tango	"Tanguera"—Sexteto Mayor	Jean-Marc Généreux; France Mousseau	Bottom 3
Jaimie Goodwin; Hokuto Konishi	Jazz	"The Chairman's Waltz" from Memoirs of a Geisha	Wade Robson	Safe
Jessi Peralta¹; Pasha Kovalev	Cha Cha	"Let's Get Loud"—Jennifer Lopez	Tony Meredith; Melanie LaPatin	Jessi Peralta eliminated

¹ Jessi Peralta was unable to participate in the performance show because she was undergoing medical treatment at the time. Melanie LaPatin danced the Cha-Cha with Pasha instead of Peralta, and only Pasha was credited with the votes for the performance. Peralta was required to perform a solo on the results show, which she was able to do, and was eliminated at that time.

==== Week 4 (July 11, 2007) ====
Judges: Nigel Lythgoe, Mary Murphy and Adam Shankman

- Couple dances:

Couple	Style	Music	Choreographer(s)	Result(s)
Lacey Schwimmer; Kameron Bink	Hustle	"Ain't No Mountain High Enough"—Inner Life	Maria Torres	Safe
Shauna Noland; Cedric Gardner	Mambo	"Flauta Y Timbal"—Tito Puente	Alex Da Silva	Both eliminated
Anya Garnis; Danny Tidwell	Contemporary	"Apologize"— OneRepublic	Tyce Diorio	Bottom 3
Sara Von Gillern; Pasha Kovalev	West Coast Swing	"The Rockafeller Skank"—Fatboy Slim	Benji Schwimmer (season 2); Heidi Groskreutz (season 2) assisting	Safe
Sabra Johnson; Dominic “D-Trix” Sandoval	Hip-Hop	"Make It Work"—Ne-Yo	Shane Sparks	Safe
Jaimie Goodwin; Hokuto Konishi	Waltz	"Angel"—Sarah McLachlan	Toni Redpath	Bottom 3
Lauren Gottlieb; Neil Haskell	Jazz	"Night of the Dancing Flame"—Róisín Murphy	Wade Robson	Safe

==== Week 5 (July 18, 2007) ====
Judges: Nigel Lythgoe, Mary Murphy and Wade Robson

- Couple dances:

Couple	Style	Music	Choreographer(s)	Result(s)
Sabra Johnson; Dominic “D-Trix” Sandoval	Jive	"I Do the Jerk"—Ryan Shaw	Tony Meredith; Melanie LaPatin	Safe
Jaimie Goodwin; Hokuto Konishi	Broadway	"Mr. Bojangles" from Fosse	Tyce Diorio; Travis Wall (season 2) assisting	Hokuto Konishi eliminated
Sara Von Gillern; Pasha Kovalev	Jazz	"Body Language"—Queen	Mandy Moore	Safe
Lauren Gottlieb; Neil Haskell	Contemporary	"Let the Drummer Kick"—Citizen Cope	Mia Michaels; Ben Susak (season 2) assisting	Bottom 3
Anya Garnis; Danny Tidwell	Foxtrot	"It Had to Be You"—Brian Evans	Jean-Marc Généreux; France Mousseau	Anya Garnis eliminated
Lacey Schwimmer; Kameron Bink	Hip-Hop	"Here I Come"—Fergie	Dan Karaty	Safe

==== Week 6 (July 25, 2007) ====
Judges: Nigel Lythgoe, Mary Murphy and Mia Michaels

- Couple dances:

Couple	Style	Music	Choreographer(s)	Result(s)
Lauren Gottlieb; Pasha Kovalev	Hip-Hop	"Fuego"—Pitbull	Shane Sparks	Lauren Gottlieb in Bottom 4
Sabra Johnson; Kameron Bink	Contemporary	"Amazing Grace"—Crystal Lewis	Tyce Diorio	Kameron Bink eliminated
Lacey Schwimmer; Danny Tidwell	Samba	"Hip Hip Chin Chin"—Club des Belugas	Dmitry Chaplin (season 2); Heidi Groskreutz (season 2) assisting	Safe
Jaimie Goodwin; Dominic “D-Trix” Sandoval	Viennese Waltz	"Man of la Mancha"—Linda Eder	Toni Redpath	Jaimie Goodwin eliminated Dominic “D-Trix” Sandoval in Bottom 4
Sara Von Gillern; Neil Haskell	Disco	"Knock on Wood"—Rachel Stevens	Doriana Sanchez	Safe

* All of the contestants also performed the same, pro-peace themed, solo routine to John Mayer's "Waiting on the World to Change", choreographed by Wade Robson.

==== Week 7 (August 1, 2007) ====
Judges: Nigel Lythgoe, Mary Murphy and Adam Shankman

- Couple dances:

Couple	Style	Music	Choreographer(s)	Result(s)
Sara Von Gillern; Danny Tidwell	Argentine Tango	"Whatever Lola Wants"—Sarah Vaughan and Gotan Project	Alex Da Silva	Sara Von Gillern eliminated
Sara Von Gillern; Danny Tidwell	Hip-Hop	"Push It"—Salt-N-Pepa	Shane Sparks	Sara Von Gillern eliminated
Lauren Gottlieb; Dominic “D-Trix” Sandoval	Krump	"I Get Money"—50 Cent	Lil' C	Lauren Gottlieb in Bottom 4 Dominic “D-Trix” Sandoval eliminated
Lauren Gottlieb; Dominic “D-Trix” Sandoval	Rumba	"Ain't No Sunshine"—Bill Withers	Tony Meredith; Melanie LaPatin	Lauren Gottlieb in Bottom 4 Dominic “D-Trix” Sandoval eliminated
Lacey Schwimmer; Neil Haskell	Latin Jazz	"Acid"—Ray Barretto	Maria Torres	Neil Haskell in Bottom 4
Lacey Schwimmer; Neil Haskell	Contemporary	"Time"—Billy Porter	Mia Michaels	Neil Haskell in Bottom 4
Sabra Johnson; Pasha Kovalev	Broadway	"A Wild Wild Party" from The Wild Party	Tyce Diorio	Safe
Sabra Johnson; Pasha Kovalev	Quickstep	"Mr Pinstripe Suit"—Big Bad Voodoo Daddy	Tony Meredith; Melanie LaPatin	Safe

==== Week 8 (August 8, 2007) ====
Judges: Nigel Lythgoe, Mary Murphy and Debbie Allen

- Couple dances:

Couple	Style	Music	Choreographer(s)	Result(s)
Lacey Schwimmer; Pasha Kovalev	Hip-Hop	"In The Morning"—Junior Boys	Dave Scott	Pasha Kovalev eliminated
Lacey Schwimmer; Pasha Kovalev	Smooth Waltz	"A Daisy In December"—Mick McAuley & Winifred Horan	Hunter Johnson	Pasha Kovalev eliminated
Lauren Gottlieb; Danny Tidwell	Contemporary	"Then You Look at Me"—Céline Dion	Mia Michaels	Lauren Gottlieb eliminated
Lauren Gottlieb; Danny Tidwell	Disco	"Don't Leave Me This Way"—The Communards	Doriana Sanchez	Lauren Gottlieb eliminated
Sabra Johnson; Neil Haskell	Jazz	"Sweet Dreams (Are Made of This)"—Eurythmics	Mandy Moore	Safe
Sabra Johnson; Neil Haskell	Paso Doble	"España cañí"—Juan & Gennaro	Tony Meredith; Melanie LaPatin	Safe

Top 6 contestant’s solos:

Contestant	Style	Music	Result
Sabra Johnson	Contemporary	"Rock Your Soul"—Elisa	Safe
Pasha Kovalev	Rumba	"Total Eclipse of the Heart"—Bonnie Tyler	Eliminated
Lauren Gottlieb	Contemporary	"Sorry"—Maria Mena	Eliminated
Neil Haskell	Contemporary	"Out of My Hands"—Dave Matthews Band	Safe
Lacey Schwimmer	Cha-cha	"Le Disko"—Shiny Toy Guns	Safe
Danny Tidwell	Contemporary	"The Fear You Won't Fall"—Joshua Radin	Safe

==== Week 9 (August 15, 2007) ====
Judges: Nigel Lythgoe, Mary Murphy and Dan Karaty

- Group dance: Top 4: "Mein Herr" from Cabaret (Broadway; Choreographer: Tyce Diorio)
- Couple dances:

Couple	Style	Music	Choreographer(s)
Sabra Johnson; Neil Haskell	Hip-Hop	"Whine Up"—Kat DeLuna feat. Elephant Man	Shane Sparks
Lacey Schwimmer; Danny Tidwell	Viennese Waltz	"Keep Holding On"—Avril Lavigne	Jean-Marc Généreux; France Mousseau
Lacey Schwimmer; Sabra Johnson	Jazz	"Koyal (Songbird)"—Nitin Sawhney	Wade Robson
Danny Tidwell; Neil Haskell	Contemporary	"Are You the One?"—The Presets	Mia Michaels
Lacey Schwimmer; Neil Haskell	Lindy Hop	"Bill's Bounce"—Bill Elliot Swing Orchestra	Nick Williams; Kristin Scorci assisting
Sabra Johnson; Danny Tidwell	Cha-cha	"Gotta Get Down (La Negra Tiene Tumbao)" [Spanglish Remix]—Celia Cruz	Melanie LaPatin; Tony Meredith assisting

- Top 4 contestant’s Ssolos:

Contestant	Style	Music
Lacey Schwimmer	Cha-cha	"Technologic"—Daft Punk
Neil Haskell	Contemporary	"Gravity"—Shawn McDonald
Danny Tidwell	Contemporary	"We Are the Champions"—Gavin DeGraw
Sabra Johnson	Contemporary	"Wonderful World"—James Morrison

=== Results shows ===
==== Week 1 (June 14, 2007) ====
- Group dance: Top 20: "Put Your Hands Where My Eyes Could See"—Busta Rhymes (Pop-Jazz; Choreographer: Wade Robson)
- Guest dancer: Benji Schwimmer: "Tu vuò fà l'americano" from The Talented Mr. Ripley (West Coast Swing)
- Musical guest: "Get It Shawty"—Lloyd
- Solos:

Contestant	Style	Music	Result
Sabra Johnson	Contemporary	"Shine"—David Gray	Safe
Dominic “D-Trix” Sandoval	Breakdance	"Let's Groove"—Earth, Wind & Fire	Safe
Ashlee Langas	Contemporary	"Cry Me a River"—Barbra Streisand	Eliminated
Ricky Palomino	Contemporary	"Virtual Insanity"—Jamiroquai	Eliminated
Faina Savich	Cha-cha	"Ain't No Other Man"—Christina Aguilera	Safe
Cedric Gardner	Hip-Hop	"Dream Within a Dream"—Wade Robson	Safe

- Eliminated:
  - Ashlee Langas
  - Ricky Palomino
- New Pairs:
  - None

==== Week 2 (June 21, 2007) ====
- Group dance: Top 18: "It Was All In Your Mind"—Wade Robson (Hip-Hop; Choreographer: Shane Sparks)
- Musical guest: "Impacto"—Daddy Yankee
- Solos:

Contestant	Style	Music	Result
Jessi Peralta	Contemporary	"Hurts So Bad"—Kina	Safe
Pasha Kovalev	Jive	"Ain't Nothing Wrong With That"—Robert Randolph and the Family Band	Safe
Shauna Noland	Contemporary	"Everything"—Lifehouse	Safe
Jimmy Arguello	Jazz	"Veins"—Charlotte Martin	Eliminated
Faina Savich	Jive	"Do You Love Me"—The Contours	Eliminated
Cedric Gardner	Hip-Hop	"Hide and Seek"—Imogen Heap	Safe

- Eliminated:
  - Faina Savich
  - Jimmy Arguello
- New Pairs:
  - Shauna Noland and Cedric Gardner

==== Week 3 (June 28, 2007) ====
- Group dance: Top 16: "The Lioness Hunt" from The Lion King (African Jazz; Choreographer: Tyce Diorio)
- Special performance:

Jessi Peralta and Pasha Kovalev performed the cha cha routine they were unable to originally exhibit due to Peralta's medical issues

- Musical guest: "Glamorous"—Fergie feat. Ludacris
- Solos:

Contestant	Style	Music	Result
Lauren Gottlieb	Jazz	"PopoZão"—Kevin Federline	Safe
Neil Haskell	Contemporary	"Come On"—Ben Jelen	Safe
Sara Von Gillern	Breakdance	"Ladies First"—Queen Latifah	Safe
Jesús Solorio	Jazz	"What I Like About You"—The Romantics	Eliminated
Jessi Peralta	Lyrical Hip-Hop	"Ice Box"—Omarion	Eliminated
Danny Tidwell	Contemporary	"A Song for You"—Elliott Yamin	Safe
Anya Garnis	Rumba	"Fields of Gold"—Eva Cassidy	Safe

- Eliminated:
  - Jessi Peralta
  - Jesús Solario
- New Pairs:
  - Sara Von Gillern and Pasha Kovalev

==== Week 4 (July 12, 2007) ====
- Group dance: Top 14: "You Can't Stop The Beat" from Hairspray (Broadway; Choreographer: Adam Shankman)
- Musical guest: "Stranger"—Hilary Duff
- Solos:

Contestant	Style	Music	Result
Anya Garnis	Cha-cha	"Magic Carpet Ride"—Mighty Dub Katz	Safe
Danny Tidwell	Contemporary	"Delirious"—Mario Spinetti	Safe
Shauna Noland	Contemporary	"Zombie"—The Cranberries	Eliminated
Cedric Gardner	Hip-Hop	"Circus"—Kelis	Eliminated
Jaimie Goodwin	Contemporary	"Childhood Dreams"—Nelly Furtado	Safe
Hokuto Konishi	Breakdance	"Ease On down the Road" from The Wiz	Safe

- Eliminated:
  - Cedric Gardner
  - Shauna Noland
- New Pairs:
  - None

==== Week 5 (July 19, 2007) ====
- Group dance: Top 12: "Boogie Woogie Bugle Boy"—Cami Thompson (Jive; Choreographer: Jean-Marc Généreux)
- Guest dancer: Jason Samuels Smith (Tap)
- Musical guest: "Somebody's Me"—Enrique Iglesias
- Solos:

Contestant	Style	Music	Result
Anya Garnis	Jive	"Proud Mary"—Ike & Tina Turner	Eliminated
Danny Tidwell	Contemporary	"Never Felt This Way"—Brian McKnight	Safe
Jaimie Goodwin	Contemporary	"One Moment More"—Mindy Smith	Safe
Hokuto Konishi	Breakdance	"Black Devil Car"—Jamiroquai	Eliminated
Lauren Gottlieb	Contemporary	"Walk Away"—Christina Aguilera	Safe
Neil Haskell	Contemporary	"Harder to Breathe"—Maroon 5	Safe

- Eliminated:
  - Anya Garnis
  - Hokuto Konishi
- New Pairs:
  - None. Now that only the top ten remain, new pairs are randomly assigned each week, and they'll be voted individually.

==== Week 6 (July 26, 2007) ====
- Group dance: Top 10: "The Moment I Said It"—Imogen Heap (Contemporary; Choreographer: Mia Michaels)
- Musical guest: "Love Today"—Mika
- Solos:

Contestant	Style	Music	Result
Jaimie Goodwin	Contemporary	"Your Ex-Lover Is Dead"—Stars	Eliminated
Dominic “D-Trix” Sandoval	Breakdance	"It's Just Begun"—Jimmy Castor Bunch	Safe
Lauren Gottlieb	Contemporary	"I Can Only Imagine"—MercyMe	Safe
Kameron Bink	Hip-Hop	"Oh Timbaland"—Timbaland	Eliminated

- Eliminated:
  - Jaimie Goodwin
  - Kameron Bink

==== Week 7 (August 2, 2007) ====
- Group dance: Top 8: "Get Up"—Ciara feat. Chamillionaire (Hip-Hop; Choreographer: Shane Sparks)
- Musical guest: "Apologize"— OneRepublic
- Top 8 contestant’s solo:

Contestant	Style	Music	Result
Sara Von Gillern	Breakdance	"Set It Off"—Big Daddy Kane	Eliminated
Lacey Schwimmer	Jive	"I'm Doing Everything (For You)"—The Rocket Summer	Safe
Sabra Johnson	Contemporary	"Better Not Touch"—Shemekia Copeland	Safe
Lauren Gottlieb	Hip-Hop	"Last Night"—Diddy feat. Keyshia Cole	Bottom 4
Neil Haskell	Contemporary	"Better Man"—James Morrison	Bottom 4
Danny Tidwell	Jazz	"Fever"—Elvis Presley	Safe
Dominic “D-Trix” Sandoval	Breakdance	"She's a Bad Mama Jama"—Carl Carlton	Eliminated
Pasha Kovalev	Paso Doble	"Scott and Fran's Paso Doble" from Strictly Ballroom	Safe

- Eliminated:
  - Sara Von Gillern
  - Dominic “D-Trix” Sandoval

==== Week 8 (August 13, 2007) ====
- Group dance: "2:19"—Tom Waits (Pop-Jazz; Choreographer: Wade Robson)
- Special Performances:
  - Titus Fotso: African Dance Music Ensemble (African jazz)
  - Lil' C and the Neph Squad: "Nephz Up"—The J Squad (Krump)
- Solos:

Contestant	Style	Music	Result
Sabra Johnson	Broadway	"I Gotcha" from Fosse	Safe
Lauren Gottlieb	Contemporary	"Heartbreaker"—Pat Benatar	Eliminated
Lacey Schwimmer	Jive	"What I Like About You"—Lillix	Safe
Pasha Kovalev	Jive	"Zoot Suit Riot"—Cherry Poppin' Daddies	Eliminated
Neil Haskell	Contemporary	"All That I Am"—Rob Thomas	Safe
Danny Tidwell	Contemporary	"2 the Sky"—Robin Thicke	Safe

- Eliminated:
  - Lauren Gottlieb
  - Pasha Kovalev

==== Week 9 (Grand Finale) (August 16, 2007) ====
Judges Nigel Lythgoe, Mary Murphy, Dan Karaty, Wade Robson, Shane Sparks and Mia Michaels

- Group dances:

Contestants	Style	Music	Choreographer(s)
Top 20	African Jazz	"The Lioness Hunt" from The Lion King	Tyce Diorio
Top 10	Contemporary	"The Moment I Said It"—Imogen Heap	Mia Michaels
Top 8	Hip-Hop	"Get Up"—Ciara feat. Chamillionaire	Shane Sparks

- Guest dancers:

Dancer(s)	Style	Music
Brendon Norris	Clogging	"The Way I Are"—Timbaland feat. Keri Hilson & D.O.E.
Bryan Gaynor	Robot dance	"Ain't No Other Man"—Christina Aguilera

- Musical guests:
  - "Whatever U Like"—Nicole Scherzinger
  - "I Will Remember You"—Ryan Cabrera
- Judges' picks:

Couples	Style	Music	Choreographer(s)	Chosen by
Lauren Gottlieb; Pasha Kovalev	Hip-Hop	"Fuego"—Pitbull	Shane Sparks	Mary Murphy
Jaimie Goodwin; Hotuko "Hok" Konishi	Jazz	"The Chairman's Waltz" from Memoirs of a Geisha	Wade Robson	Nigel Lythgoe
Sabra Johnson; Dominic “D-Trix” Sandoval	Hip-Hop	"Make It Work"—Ne-Yo	Shane Sparks	Jean-Marc Généreux
Sara Von Gillern; Neil Haskell	Disco	"Knock on Wood"—Rachel Stevens	Doriana Sanchez	Adam Shankman
Lacey Schwimmer; Danny Tidwell	Samba	"Hip Hip Chin Chin"—Club Des Belugas	Dmitry Chaplin	Wade Robson
Sara Von Gillern; Pasha Kovalev	West Coast Swing	"The Rockafeller Skank"—Fatboy Slim	Benji Schwimmer	Shane Sparks
Anya Garnis; Danny Tidwell	Foxtrot	"It Had to Be You"—Brian Evans	Jean-Marc Généreux	Tyce Diorio
Sara Von Gillern; Jesús Solorio	Pop-Jazz	"Cabaret Hoover" from The Triplets of Belleville (Les Triplettes de Belleville)	Wade Robson	Tony Meredith
Sabra Johnson; Neil Haskell	Jazz	"Sweet Dreams (Are Made of This)"—Eurythmics	Mandy Moore	Mia Michaels
Lacey Schwimmer; Neil Haskell	Contemporary	"Time"—Billy Porter	Mia Michaels	Dan Karaty

- 4th Place
  - Lacey Schwimmer
- 3rd Place
  - Neil Haskell
- Runner-Up
  - Danny Tidwell
- Winner
  - Sabra Johnson

== Other ==
=== Live tour ===
As in season 2, the top 10 contestants embarked on a live tour of the United States. Due to the success of the previous tour, this season's engagement was extended to 10 weeks and visited 50 cities. Tickets went on sale 11 August. On the season finale, Hokuto Konishi, Shauna Noland, Anya Garnis, and Jesús Solorio were named as alternate performers in the event of injury to any of the top 10. Noland, Garnis, and Jaimie Goodwin had been replacing Lacey Schwimmer in some of her tour routines because of an injury to her meniscus.

== Awards ==
=== 2008 Emmy Awards ===
Result	Category	Recipient(s)/ Choreographer(s)	Performers	Music
Won	Outstanding Choreography	Wade Robson	Jaimie Goodwin; Hokuto Konishi	"The Chairman's Waltz" from Memoirs of a Geisha
Nominated	Outstanding Choreography	Mandy Moore	Sabra Johnson; Neil Haskell	"Sweet Dreams (Are Made of This)"—Eurythmics
Nominated	Outstanding Choreography	Shane Sparks	Lauren Gottlieb; Pasha Kovalev	"Fuego"—Pitbull
Nominated	Outstanding Makeup For A Multi-Camera; Series Or Special (Non-Prosthetic)	Amy Strozzi; Heather Cummings; Tifanie White; Crystal Wolfchild	—	—

== Broadcast outside of the United States ==
Australia is currently the only country outside of the United States that airs So You Think You Can Dance on Network Ten which premiered on 27 September 2007. Before the show was aired, commercials were shown with Cat Deeley wearing the same blue dress she wore on the 19 September result show with long earrings and her hair tied back, started to broadcast the show to the Australian audience saying "Coming on Ten". Other footage that was shown included Nigel Lythgoe doing a little dance and wearing the same suit on that result show. During the show with the top 20, after the last couple danced, Cat Deeley (still wearing the same dress on the 19th of September's result show) says "Will your favourite dancer make it through to the next round? Don't go anywhere Australia (Deeley doing a little head shake), because the result show is coming up right after this break". During this time, Australia started to do auditions for So You Think You Can Dance Australia. It has been discovered by fans of the show that Channel 10 has been showing a heavily edited version of SYTYCD Season 3, with the audition shows compressed into two episodes and even leaving whole dances out of some of the live shows (e.g. The Paso Doble to We Will Rock You By Sara and Jesús).

The series is currently shown on DSTV Channel 104 across Africa. It finished on 22 November 2007.

It is also being shown in Canada on Muchmusic.

In the Middle East, it is being shown on MBC 4. It premiered on 24 October.

It is also shown on the Fox network in Japan without any editing with the performance and elimination round being shown on the same night. Following the show, Japanese amateur contestants are also shown, usually 4 contestants per week. It is currently showing the top 12 contestants as of 2007 December 30.

SYTYCD is also currently being shown in the UK on LivingTV every Wednesday at 8pm and is repeated throughout the week.

SYTYCD was also being broadcast in India on AXN every Tuesday at 9pm.

In Singapore, the show is currently aired on MediaCorp TV Channel 5.

In Hong Kong, it is also currently airing on TVB Pearl, at Saturday nights on 8:30pm.

It is also shown in the Philippines in the velvet channel, velvet channel airs different reality shows all over the world mostly from the United States.

In Norway, the showed the season at TVNorge.

In Latin America, the show is aired on People & Arts, cable TV.

== Ratings ==
=== U.S. Nielsen ratings ===
Show	Episode	First air date	Rating (18–49)	Share (18–49)	Viewers (millions)	Rank (timeslot)	Rank (night)
1	Auditions #1	May 24, 2007	5.9	11	9.5	1	3
2	Auditions #2 and #3 (L.A. and Chicago)	May 30, 2007	5.7	10	9.3	1	3
3	Auditions #4	May 31, 2007	6.5	11	10.6	2	2
4	Las Vegas Call-Backs #1	June 6, 2007	6.5	11	10.3	1	1
5	Las Vegas Call-Backs #2 (Top 20 Chosen)	June 7, 2007	6.9	11	11.1	1	1
6	Top 20 Perform	June 13, 2007	5.8	10	8.9	1	1
7	2 of 20 Voted Off Live	June 14, 2007	6.5	11	10.6	1 (tied)	1 (tied)
8	Top 18 Perform	June 20, 2007	5.4	10	9.2	1	1
9	2 of 18 Voted Off	June 21, 2007	5.9	10	9.0	2	2
10	Top 16 Perform	June 27, 2007	5.7	10	9.3 (Note: Nielsen split this episode into two, so a combined average is displayed here. The first half gained 8.7 million viewers with a 5.4/10 rating/share, ranked number 1 in the timeslot and number 3 for the night. The second half, which aired at 9 pm, gained 9.8 million viewers with a 6.0/10 rating/share, and ranked number 1 in both the timeslot and night.)	1	1 (tied)
11	2 of 16 Voted Off	June 28, 2007	5.9	10	9.4	2	2
12	Top 14 Perform	July 11, 2007	4.9	9	7.7	1	4
13	2 of 14 Voted Off	July 12, 2007	5.9	10	9.7	2	2
14	Top 12 Perform	July 18, 2007	5.2	9	8.1	1	3
15	2 of 12 Voted Off	July 19, 2007	5.9	10	9.1	2	2
16	Top 10 Perform	July 25, 2007	5.0	9	7.9	1	3
17	2 of 10 Voted Off	July 26, 2007	5.9	10	9.1	2	2
18	Top 8 Perform	August 1, 2007	5.2	9	8.3	1	2
19	2 of 8 Voted Off	August 2, 2007	5.8	10	9.6	2	3
20	Top 6 Perform	August 8, 2007	4.8	9	7.9	2	5
21	2 of 6 Voted Off	August 13, 2007	4.9	9	7.9	1	4 (tied)
22	Top 4 Perform	August 15, 2007	5.5	10	8.7	1	3
23	Winner Announced	August 16, 2007	5.9	10	9.6	1	3

== See also ==
- List of So You Think You Can Dance finalists
