= Schwimmer =

Schwimmer and Schwimer (pronounced [ˈʃvɪmɐ]) are surnames (German for 'swimmer') which may refer to:

== Entertainment ==
- Benji Schwimmer (born 1984), American dancer, choreographer and actor, winner of So You Think You Can Dance
- Buddy Schwimmer (born 1950), swing dancer, father of Benji and Lacey
- David Schwimmer (born 1966), American actor, best known for the TV series Friends
- Lacey Schwimmer (born 1988), American dancer and singer, US Open Swing Champion, US National Latin Champion
- Rusty Schwimmer (born 1962), American actress

== Other ==
- Al Schwimmer (1917–2011), Israeli businessman
- David Schwimmer (banker) (born 1968/69), American CEO of the London Stock Exchange Group
- Michael Schwimer (born 1986), American baseball player
- Rosika Schwimmer (1877–1948), Hungarian-Jewish pacifist, feminist, and world federalist
- Walter Schwimmer (born 1942), Austrian diplomat

== See also ==
- United States v. Schwimmer, a 1929 U.S. Supreme Court case dealing with Rosika Schwimmer's naturalization
- Volkswagen Schwimmwagen, nicknamed "Schwimmer"
- Schwimmer Airfield, Papua New Guinea
