= Leading Ladies (film) =

- Film poster
- Directed by: Daniel Beahm and Erika Randall Beahm
- Written by: Erika Randall Beahm and Jennifer Bechtel
- Produced by: Daniel Beahm
- Starring: Benji Schwimmer; Melanie LaPatin; Laurel Vail; Shannon Lea Smith; Nicole Dionne
- Cinematography: Pete Biagi
- Edited by: Jonas Bendsen
- Music by: Daniel Beahm
- Production company: Teahm Beahm
- Distributed by: Wolfe Video
- Release dates: April 17, 2010 (Sonoma International Film Festival); September 13, 2011 (United States)
- Running time: 102 minutes
- Country: United States
- Language: English

Leading Ladies is a 2010 dance film directed by Daniel Beam and Erika Randall Beahm and starring Benji Schwimmer, Melanie LaPatin, Laurel Vail, Shannon Lea Smith, and Nicole Dionne. The film features an overbearing ballroom stage mother and her two daughters who must redefine their roles in life, and on the dance floor. The film also features dance scenes with finalists from season 3 and season 4 of the American version of So You Think You Can Dance: Katee Shean, Kherington Payne, Courtney Galiano, and Sara Von Gillern.

Leading Ladies premiered in April 2010 at the Sonoma International Film Festival, where it won the Showcase Award. Since then, the film has screened at more than 65 festivals worldwide including the 22nd Palm Springs International Film Festival (Gala Screening), the 33rd Starz Denver Film Festival, the 35th Frameline Film Festival. and the Vail International Film Festival After screening at Newfest in NYC, Leading Ladies received a favorable review in Variety. The film was picked up for North American distribution by Wolfe Video after screening at Outfest in LA.

== Plot ==
Sheri Campari (Melanie LaPatin) is the single mother of two daughters: Tasi (Shannon Lea) and Toni (Laurel Vail). Sheri is training Tasi to become a professional competitive ballroom dancer with the help of Toni and flamboyantly gay dance partner Cedric Michaels (Benji Schwimmer). They are always training and the pressure is growing as the prospects of becoming professional get closer.

Toni sees Tasi throwing up in the bathroom and thinks it's because of the diet their mother enforces to maintain Tasi's figure. Toni tells Tasi to confide in her but Tasi tells her is none of her business. Later on, it is let known that Tasi is pregnant with twins. The father is a neighbor who apparently doesn't want the responsibility and argues with Tasi at the restaurant where Toni works.

Cedric takes Toni to a dancing club where he disappears with a boyfriend. Alone in the club, Toni meets Mona Saunders (Nicole Dionne) whom Toni leads in dancing. Mona takes Toni to her home and they end up getting involved in a lesbian relationship.

Oblivious to Tesi's pregnancy, Sheri tries to fit a dress until Tesi blurts out that she's not fat, she's pregnant. Meanwhile, Mona gets hurt by Toni wanting to keep their relationship a secret. Cedric and Tesi convince Toni to take part in the upcoming dancing competition to replace Tasi. Toni agrees on the condition that they both help her train and that her partner will be Mona. Tesi is relieved as she perceives that her pregnancy will be less of an issue with Sheri than Toni's lesbianism.

When Sheri sees Toni practicing with Mona, she storms out. The sisters have to fend on their own with the help of Cedric and Mona who take the sisters for the first time to a grocery store which was always Sheri's job.

Eventually, they go to the dance competition but the judges do not approve Toni and Mona's participatipation as it is against their bylaws. Suddenly, Sheri appears and provides an impassionate defense of the right of Mona and Toni to participate in the dance competition. In the middle of Sheri's defense, Tasi announces that she's going into labor and they all have to go to a hospital. The film ends with the newborn babies in Sheri's arms.

== Cast ==
- Benji Schwimmer as Cedric Michaels
- Melanie LaPatin as Sheri Campari
- Laurel Vail as Toni Campari
- Shannon Lea Smith as Tasi Campari
- Nicole Dionne as Mona Saunders

== Awards ==
- 2010 Sonoma International Film Festival: Showcase Award
- 2010 Palm Beach Women's Film Festival: Best Feature Film
- 2011 The United Film Festivals: San Francisco: Audience Choice Best Narrative Feature
