= Dmitry Chaplin =

Russian ballroom dancer and reality TV contestant (born 1982)

- Дмитрий Чаплин
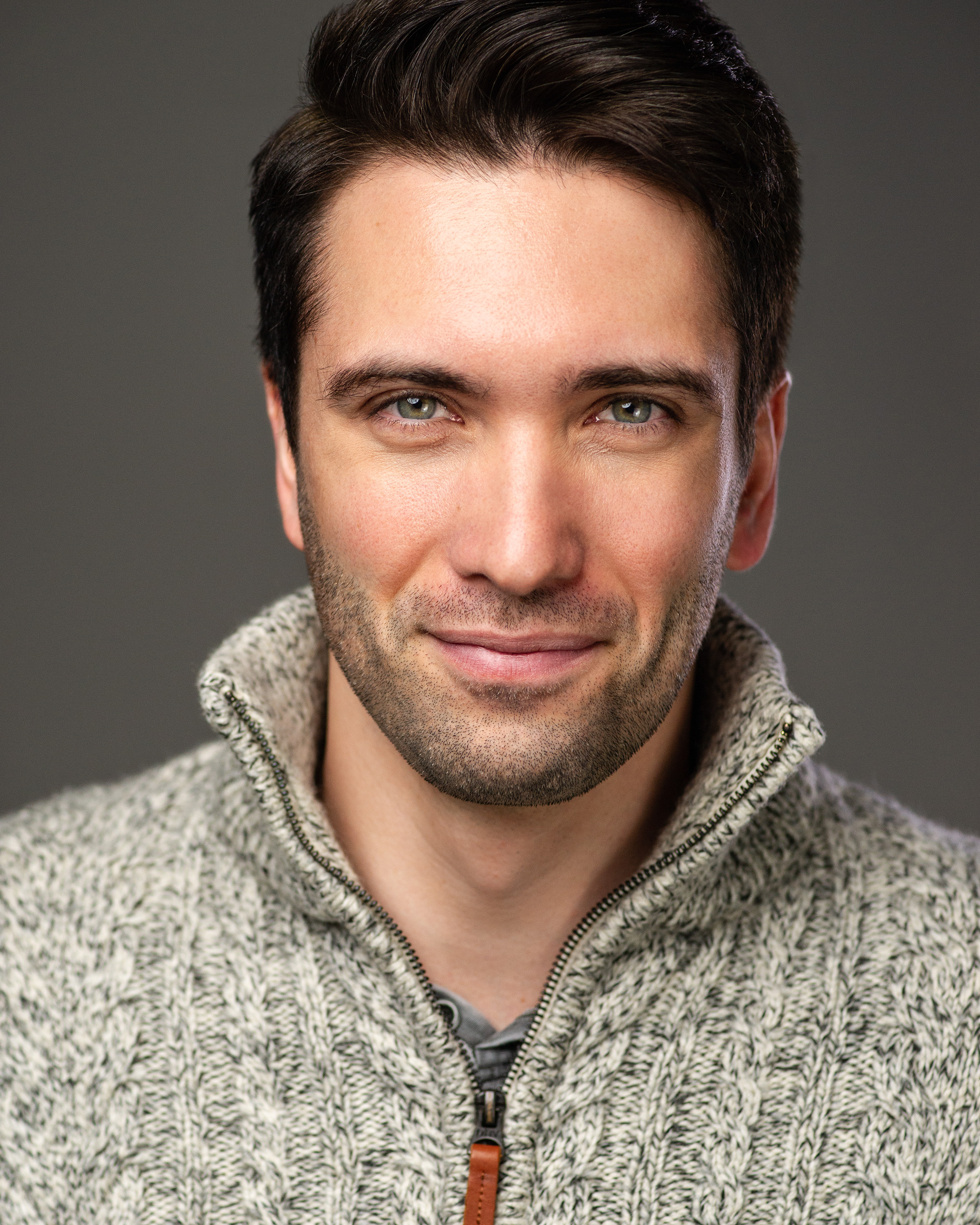
- Chaplin in 2020
- Born: July 14, 1982 (age 44); Rostov-on-Don, Russian SFSR, Soviet Union
- Occupations: Professional dancer; choreographer; actor
- Spouse: Eugenia Shatilova (m. 2017; div. 2023)

Dmitry Alexandrovich Chaplin (Russian: Дмитрий Александрович Чаплин; born July 14, 1982) is a Russian dancer, choreographer, and actor, best known for being a contestant on the second season of the dance competition series So You Think You Can Dance as the sixth male contestant and in gender the sixth overall contestant to be eliminated. While competing on the series, he became known for performing shirtless, with one solo routine having him rip off his shirt. In 2009, Chaplin was nominated for a Primetime Emmy Award for his choreography.

== Early life and education ==
Dmitry Chaplin was born in Rostov-on-Don, Russia, on July 14, 1982. As of 2020, he lives in Los Angeles, California. He graduated from School #8 in Rostov-on-Don and Minnetonka High School in Minnetonka, Minnesota, and attended Brooklyn College in Brooklyn, New York, for one semester.

== Career ==
Chaplin partnered with Heidi Groskreutz and was a national finalist in U.S. National Amateur Dancesport Championships in Provo, Utah that occurred on March 11, 2006. His dancing coach since 2004 has been Louis van Amstel, who was partnered with actress Lisa Rinna on the U.S. show Dancing with the Stars that time.

In 2006, Chaplin was part of the top twenty contestants cast on Season 2 of So You Think You Can Dance. His dance style was categorized as extremely masculine, and several episodes of the show featured parodies with other male contestants seeking Chaplin's advice.

As a recurring theme, Chaplin would expose his chest while dancing; during one of his later performances, he deliberately teased the judges with an ending where he kept his shirt on.

Chaplin has stated,

For the audience, it's kind of awkward to see my shirt open all the time, but as a ballroom dancer I always compete with open shirts. This is the custom. It's not like I just decided to come on the show and undress.

The judges generally rated his dancing positively, but call-in votes still repeatedly placed him in the bottom three couples each week. Two of his first pair, Joy Spears, and Aleksandra Wojda were eliminated consecutively, and a third, Ashlee Nino, after two weeks together, so he was labeled as being cursed. Chaplin was partnered with Donyelle Jones during the July 19 show, when all the contestants switched pairs. On the results show of July 20, it was revealed that Donyelle had "beaten the curse", but Chaplin was unable to beat it himself; he was eliminated along with Martha Nichols. Chaplin was on the Season 2 U.S. live tour, and performed before sold-out audiences with his fellow contestant.

For Season 3, Chaplin made an appearance as Mary Murphy's assistant for the Latin dance portion of the Las Vegas eliminations.

On May 3, 2007, Chaplin made a special performance before the results were announced on the So You Think You Can Dance (Malaysia, Season 1).

On July 25, 2007, Chaplin, assisted by Heidi Groskreutz, choreographed a Samba routine for contestants Lacey Schwimmer and Danny Tidwell.

On July 23, 2008, for Season 4, Chaplin choreographed an Argentine Tango routine for contestants Chelsie Hightower and Joshua Allen which earned him an Emmy nomination.

On August 7, 2008, Chaplin partnered judge Mary Murphy in a surprise Samba on the Season 4 finale.

October 2008: (So You Think You Can Dance Holland), Chaplin choreographed a Samba routine for contestants Sigourney and Ivan and a Rumba routine for contestants Annemiek and Timor.

On October 29, 2008, Chaplin choreographed a Samba routine for contestants of So You Think You Can Dance Canada, Vincent-Oliver Noiseux and Lisa Auguste. On November 5, 2008, Chaplin choreographed a Jive routine for contestants of So You Think You Can Dance Canada, Izaak Smith and Kaitlyn Fitzgerald. On December 5, 2008, Chaplin choreographed a Paso Doble routine for Top 4 contestants of Танцюють Всi (Ukrainian So You Think You Can Dance), Alexander Ostanin and Mariyam Turkmenbaev.

== After So You Think You Can Dance ==
After the So You Think You Can Dance Tour, Dmitry moved to Los Angeles to pursue a career in show business. He has also taught dance classes at Mary Murphy's Champion Ballroom Academy.

On June 30, 2007, Dmitry was the only So You Think You Can Dance participant to appear on the Reality All-Stars fund raising event.

In March 2008 he served as a judge at the Broadway Dreams Dance Competition in Niagara Falls, Canada.

On April 9, 2008, Dmitry performed together with professional dancer Fabienne Liechti in the Idol Gives Back fund-raiser on Fox's American Idol.

Chaplin was selected to be a professional on season 8 of Dancing with the Stars. While he was originally supposed to have Jewel as his celebrity partner, she withdrew because of fractured tibias in both legs; his partner ended up being Holly Madison. Madison and Chaplin were eliminated in the fourth week of the competition. This was not, however, Chaplin's first DWTS appearance: when Aretha Franklin appeared as a guest performer in season 7, Chaplin performed a routine with other DWTS performers Karina Smirnoff, Anna Trebunskaya, and Louis van Amstel. Chaplin finished in 2nd place in season 9 of Dancing with the Stars with singer, Mýa. He most recently competed on season 12 of Dancing with the Stars with supermodel Petra Němcová. They were the fourth couple eliminated on April 19, 2011.

Dmitry choreographed Chelsie Hightower and Joshua Allen in an Argentine Tango to "A Los Amigos" from the Forever Tango soundtrack in July 2008; a year later he was nominated for a Primetime Emmy Award for Outstanding Choreography.

On August 28, 2018, Dmitry began to dance in the Ukrainian version of the show Dancing with the Stars. He was partnered with Ukrainian X-Factor and Ukraine's Got Talent host Oksana Marchenko.

== Dancing with the Stars USA ==
Season	Partner	Place
8	Holly Madison	11th
9	Mýa	2nd
12	Petra Nemcova	8th

== Dancing with the Stars Ukraine ==
Season	Partner	Place
5	Oksana Marchenko	7th

=== With Holly Madison ===
- Average: 17.3
- Placed: 11th

Week #	Dance/Song	Judges' score			Result
Week #	Dance/Song	Inaba	Goodman	Tonioli	Result
1	Cha-Cha-Cha/ "Just Dance"	6	6	6	No Elimination
2	Quickstep/"We Are in Love"	6	6	6	Safe
3	Samba/"Belly Dancer (Bananza)"	5	6	6	Bottom Two
4	Argentine Tango/"Libertango"	5	6	5	Eliminated

=== With Mýa ===
- Average: 27.3
- Placed: 2nd

Week #	Dance/Song	Judges' score			Result
Week #	Dance/Song	Inaba	Goodman	Tonioli	Result
1	Viennese Waltz/"Vision of Love"; Cha-Cha-Cha Relay/"Centerfold"	8 Awarded	5; 10	8 Points	Safe
2	Jive/"Would You...?"	9	*9	9	Safe
3	Rumba/"Underneath Your Clothes"	10	7	10	Safe
4	Lambada/"Ain't It Funny"	9	9	10	Safe
5	Argentine Tango/"They"	9	9	9	Safe
6	Jitterbug/"C'mon Everybody"; Mambo Marathon/"Ran Kan Kan"	8 Awarded	7; 9	9 Points	Safe
7	Foxtrot/"Is You Is or Is You Ain't My Baby"; Team Paso Doble/ "I Hate Myself for Loving You"	8; 8	8; 8	9; 8	Safe
8	Quickstep/"Baby Wants a Diamond Ring"; Samba/"Bad Girls"	9; 10	10; 10	10; 10	Safe
9 Semi-finals	Waltz/"Amore e Musica"; Salsa/"La Isla Bonita"; Cha-Cha-Cha/"Fire Burning"	9; 10; 9	9; 10; 10	10; 10; 10	Safe
10; Finals	Paso Doble/"We Will Rock You"; Megamix/"You and Me"/ "Whenever, Wherever" / "Maniac"; Freestyle/"You Can't Stop the Beat"; Jive/"Would You...?"	10; 10; 9; 9	10; 10; 9; 9	10; 10; 9; 10	Runner Up

- Baz Luhrmann was a guest judge for Week 2

=== With Petra Němcová ===
- Average: 21.2
- Placed: 8th

Week #	Dance/Song	Judges' score			Result
Week #	Dance/Song	Inaba	Goodman	Tonioli	Result
1	Foxtrot/"Don't Know Why"	6	6	6	No Elimination
2	Jive/"Crazy Little Thing Called Love"	6	6	6	Safe
3	Waltz/"You Raise Me Up"	8	9	8	Safe
4	Paso Doble/"Les Voici! Voici La Quadrille!"	8	7	8	Safe
5	Quickstep/"Viva Las Vegas"	7	7	8	Eliminated

=== With Oksana Marchenko ===
- Average: 19.4
- Placed: 7th

Week #	Dance/Song	Judges' score			Result
Week #	Dance/Song	Monatik	Kukhar	Yama	Result
1	Waltz/"Moon River" — Audrey Hepburn	7	6	6	No Elimination
2	Samba/"Ain't It Funny" — Jennifer Lopez	7	6	5	No Elimination
3	Rumba/"Young and Beautiful" — Лана Дель Рей	7	7	7	Safe
4	Arg. Tango/"Por Una Cabeza" — Tango Project	7	6	7	Safe
5	Freestyle/"Навернопотомучто" — Время и Стекло	6	6	5	Safe
6	Foxtrot/"Жовтий лист" — Софія Ротару	7	7	7	Safe
7	Contemporary/"Нас нет" — Ірина Білик	8	6	6	Eliminated

== Awards and achievements ==
- 2009 EMMY Nomination for Outstanding Choreography
- US National Latin Finalist with Heidi Groskreutz Burns
- Dancing With The Stars Runner Up with celebrity partner Mya
- Top 10 of So You Think You Can Dance Season 2

== Personal life ==
Chaplin married fellow professional ballroom dancer Eugenia Shatilova in October 2017. The couple divorced in February 2023, after nearly six years of marriage.

== See also ==
- So You Think You Can Dance (U.S.)
  - So You Think You Can Dance (Season 2)
  - So You Think You Can Dance (Season 3)
  - So You Think You Can Dance (Season 4)
- Dancing with the Stars (U.S. TV series)
  - Dancing with the Stars (U.S. season 8)
  - Dancing with the Stars (U.S. season 9)
  - Dancing with the Stars (U.S. season 12)

Awards and achievements
Preceded by Gilles Marini & Cheryl Burke	Dancing with the Stars (U.S.) runner up Season 9 (Fall 2009 with Mýa)	Succeeded by Evan Lysacek & Anna Trebunskaya
