= Lacey Schwimmer =

American ballroom dancer and singer (born 1988)

- Born: Lacey Mae Schwimmer; June 28, 1988 (age 38); Redlands, California, U.S.
- Occupations: Dancer, singer
- Television: So You Think You Can Dance; Dancing with the Stars
- Partner: Frankie Moreno (eng. 2025)
- Parent: Buddy Schwimmer (father)
- Relatives: Benji Schwimmer (brother); Heidi Groskreutz (cousin)

Lacey Mae Schwimmer (born June 28, 1988) is an American ballroom dancer and singer. She is best known as a contestant of the third season of So You Think You Can Dance who placed fourth. She is the daughter of noted dancer Buddy Schwimmer, as well as the cousin of Heidi Groskreutz, who placed fourth on the second season of So You Think You Can Dance and younger sister of Benji Schwimmer, the winner of the show's second season. She participated in the seventh season of Dancing with the Stars as a professional dancer paired with Lance Bass of NSYNC, in the eighth season of the show paired with Jackass star Steve-O and in the ninth season paired with actor and Iron Chef America host Mark Dacascos. Schwimmer returned to Dancing with the Stars for its eleventh season and she was partnered with Disney Channel star Kyle Massey and in the 12th season, paired with radio host Mike Catherwood. In the thirteenth season, she was paired with transgender activist Chaz Bono. Schwimmer did not return for season 14 of Dancing with the Stars.

Schwimmer competes in West Coast Swing and International Latin dance styles. She made an appearance in Jon Chu and Adam Sevani's "Biggest Online Dance Battle" against M&M Cru and was credited as a member of America's Best Dance Crew with Hok, another So You Think You Can Dance competitor. She's made television appearances on The Ellen DeGeneres Show, Good Morning America, and Jimmy Kimmel Live!. In 2008 she danced alongside Adam Sandler at the MTV Movie Awards 2008. She then appeared in the video of the song Rainbow, by Elisa with singer songwriter Vinnie Ferra.

She is a part of the iHollywood Dance faculty teaching master classes in the United States and Norway. Schwimmer also has her own line of tube socks as well as a dance wear line designed by Sugar and Bruno Dancewear collection.

Schwimmer's debut single, "Love Soundz", was released June 21, 2011.

== Early life ==
Lacey Schwimmer grew up in Redlands, California. Her parents are Laurie Kauffman and notable West Coast Swing dancer Buddy Schwimmer. She is the younger sister of Benji Schwimmer, winner of the second season of So You Think You Can Dance.

Schwimmer has been training and dancing competitively since a young age. At age seven, she and partner Brian Cordoba danced in the 1995 U.S. Open Swing Dance Championships. At age ten, she and partner Blace Thompson placed 1st in the Young America Division at the 1998 U.S. Open Swing Dance Championships. Schwimmer went on to have annual top rankings at the U.S. Open Swing Dance Championships and has won numerous U.S. titles.

== Early career ==
In January 2003, Schwimmer was paired with Jared Murillo, and the two began competing at a junior level. They were upgraded to the youth level in August 2003 and participated in dozens of competitions. They received the U.S. title in the Young Adult Division of the U.S. Open Swing Dance Championships. They were also awarded the US National Youth Latin Championship in 2006. Schwimmer also appeared in Christina Aguilera's "Candyman" music video as a jitterbugger.

Schwimmer and Murillo have a cameo appearance in The Suite Life of Zack & Cody in the episode "Loosely Ballroom". She is in the background of the scene during which a ballroom competition takes place.

=== So You Think You Can Dance ===
Schwimmer entered the preliminary auditions for So You Think You Can Dance's third season partnered by her brother, Benji Schwimmer, following his win the previous season.

After her selection to the top 20 contestants, Schwimmer was paired with contemporary/hip hop contestant Kameron Bink. The two danced together for five weeks successfully, with judges praising their chemistry and the ease with which they danced together; they were the only couple never in danger of elimination. As per the show's competitive structure at the time, couples were assigned new partners each week after week five; Schwimmer subsequently partnered with Danny Tidwell, Neil Haskell and Pasha Kovalev before being named to the season's Top 4 Contestant.

Historically, Lacey Schwimmer is among a group of ten contestants to have advanced through their respective seasons to the finales without finishing a single episode in jeopardy of elimination (others include Blake McGrath, Donyelle Jones, Katee Shean, Jakob Karr, Ashleigh Di Lello, Evan Kasprzak, Kent Boyd, Marko Germar, Jim Nowakowski, Gino Cosculluela, Sophie Pittman and champions of seasons 2, 4, 8, 11, 12 respectively, Benji Schwimmer, Joshua Allen, Melanie Moore, Ricky Ubeda, Gaby Diaz).

Schwimmer joined her fellow season 3 contestants in the show's 2007 dance tour, which began in Albany, New York.

Lacey assisted her brother Benji in choreographing a West Coast Swing routine for Katee Shean and Joshua Allen during the show's fourth season.

Week	Partner	Dance	Song	Result
1	Kameron Bink	Contemporary	"Dancing" by Elisa	Safe
2	Kameron Bink	Broadway	"Overture/All That Jazz" from Chicago	Safe
3	Kameron Bink	Quickstep	"Big and Bad" by Big Bad Voodoo Daddy	Safe
4	Kameron Bink	Hustle	"Ain't No Mountain High Enough" by Inner Life	Safe
5	Kameron Bink	Hip-hop	"Here I Come" by Fergie	Safe
6	Danny Tidwell	Samba	"Hip Hip Chin Chin" by Club des Belugas	Safe
6	Solo		"Waiting on the World to Change"—John Mayer	Safe
7	Neil Haskell	Latin jazz	"Acid" by Ray Barretto	Safe
7	Neil Haskell	Contemporary	"Time" by Billy Porter	Safe
7	Results Show Solo		"I'm Doing Everything (For You)"—The Rocket Summer	Safe
8	Pasha Kovalev	Hip-hop	"In the Morning" by Junior Boys	Safe
8	Pasha Kovalev	Smooth waltz	"A Daisy in December" – Mick McAuley & Winifred Horan	Safe
8	Solo		"Le Disko"—Shiny Toy Guns	Safe
8	Results Show Solo		"What I Like About You"—Lillix	Safe
9	Danny Tidwell	Viennese Waltz	"Keep Holding On"—Avril Lavigne	4th Place
9	Sabra Johnson	Jazz	"Koyal (Songbird)"—Nitin Sawhney	4th Place
9	Neil Haskell	Lindy hop	"Bill's Bounce"—Bill Elliot Swing Orchestra	4th Place
9	Solo		"Technologic"—Daft Punk	4th Place

Note: Results highlighted in red indicate that contestants placed in the bottom dancers or couples, but may not have necessarily been eliminated.

== Later career ==
=== Dancing with the Stars ===
On the morning of August 25, 2008, on Good Morning America, Schwimmer was announced as the first So You Think You Can Dance alum to be a professional dancer on season seven of Dancing with the Stars and was partnered with Lance Bass. TV Guide reported that Schwimmer had endometriosis but was still able to continue on the show as her condition was caught early and therefore did not require surgery. She returned for seasons 8, 9, 11, 12 and 13. During that time, she and professional dancers Chelsie Hightower and Dmitry Chaplin were the only former participants from So You Think You Can Dance to perform as regulars on Dancing with the Stars. However, other SYTYCD alumni such as Anya Garnis, Iveta Lukosiute, Ashleigh Di Lello, Ryan DiLello and Pasha Kovalev have often done special performances performed during the results show.

On November 25, 2008, Schwimmer and her celebrity partner, Lance Bass, finished in third place. Lacey was on the last DWTS tour with her partner Lance Bass. The tour ended on February 8, 2009. Lacey returned for season eight of DWTS, and she was partnered with reality television star Steve-O. On August 24, 2009, it was announced on Good Morning America that Schwimmer would be partnering with Mark Dacascos for season nine. Schwimmer was not paired with a celebrity partner in season ten, but was present in a few results show dances.

In season 11, Schwimmer was partnered with Disney Channel star Kyle Massey. They made it to the finale and were the runners-up to Jennifer Grey and Derek Hough. For season 12, Lacey was partnered with radio personality Mike Catherwood. They were eliminated first on March 29, 2011. For season 13, Schwimmer was partnered with Chaz Bono. They were eliminated on October 25, 2011.

Season	Partner	Place
7	Lance Bass	3rd
8	Steve-O	8th
9	Mark Dacascos	6th
11	Kyle Massey	2nd
12	Mike Catherwood	11th
13	Chaz Bono	7th

=== With Lance Bass ===
Average:24.5

Week #	Dance/Song	Judges' score			Result
Week #	Dance/Song	Inaba	Goodman	Tonioli	Result
1	Cha Cha/ "Jumpin' Jack Flash"	8	6	8	Safe
1	Quickstep/ "Close to Me"	7	6	8	Safe
2	Paso Doble/ "I Kissed a Girl"	7	6	7	Safe
3	Viennese Waltz/ "Let Me Leave"	8	7	7	Last to be called safe
4	Tango/ "Disturbia"	9	8	9	Safe
5	West Coast Swing/ "Breakin' Dishes"	7	7	7	Safe
6	Jive/ "Tutti Frutti"; Old School Hip Hop/"It Takes Two"	9 No	9* Scores	9 Given	Safe
7	Rumba/ "Your Body Is a Wonderland"	9	7	9	Safe
7	Team Cha Cha/ "Mercy"	6	7	7	Safe
8	Foxtrot/ "Sweet Pea"	9	8	9	Safe
8	Samba/ "1 Thing"	8	7	9	Safe
Semifinals	Mambo/ "Straight to Number One"	10	9	9	Safe
Semifinals	Jitterbug/ "Jim Dandy"	10	9	10	Safe
Finals	Samba/ "Blame It on the Boogie"	9	8	9	Third Place
Finals	Freestyle/ "It's Tricky"	9	9	9	Third Place
Finals	Jitterbug/ "Jim Dandy"	9	9	10	Third Place

- Score was awarded by stand in judge Michael Flatley.

=== With Steve-O ===
Average:15.8

Week #	Dance/Song	Judges' score			Result
Week #	Dance/Song	Inaba	Goodman	Tonioli	Result
1	Waltz/ "Vito's Waltz"	6	5	6	No elimination
2	Salsa/ "Cobrastyle"	5	4	5	Safe
3	Foxtrot/ "I'm Yours"	5	5	5	Safe
4	Lindy Hop/ "Dance Little Sister"	5	5	5	Bottom 3
5	Viennese Waltz/ "Complainte de la Butte"	6	6	6	Safe
6	Rumba/ "Fall For You"	7	4	5	Eliminated

=== With Mark Dacascos ===
Average:22.1

Week #	Dance/Song	Judges' score			Result
Week #	Dance/Song	Inaba	Goodman	Tonioli	Result
1	Cha Cha Cha/"Kung Fu Fighting"	7	7	7	Safe
1	Viennese Waltz/"I'm Your Man"	Awarded	Eight	Points	Safe
2	Quickstep/"King of Swing"	7	7*	7	Safe
3	Rumba/"Don't Lie"	6	6	6	Safe
4	Two-Step/"Nothin' Better to Do"	8	7	7	Safe
5	Paso Doble/"Diablo Rojo"	9	9	8	Safe
5	Hustle/"The Hustle"	No	Score	Given	Safe
6	Jitterbug/"This Cat's On a Hot Tin Roof"; Mambo/"Ran Kan Kan"	9 Awarded	9; 6	8 Points	Safe
7	Samba/"Switch"; Team Paso Doble/"I Hate Myself for Loving You"; Replaced by Anna Trebunskaya	6; 8	7; 8	6; 8	Eliminated

- Score was awarded by stand in judge Baz Luhrmann.

=== With Kyle Massey ===
Average:24.9

Week #	Dance/Song	Judges' score			Result
Week #	Dance/Song	Inaba	Goodman	Tonioli	Result
1	Cha Cha Cha/ "My First Kiss"	8	7	8	Last to be called Safe
2	Quickstep/ "(If You're Wondering If I Want You To) I Want You To"	8	7	7	Safe
3	Waltz/"Falling In Love At a Coffee Shop"	8	7	8	Safe
4	Rumba/"Nothin' on You"	6/8	6/7	6/7	Safe
5	Foxtrot/"Charlie's Angels Theme"	8	5	7	Safe
6	Tango/"If I Had You"; Rock n' Roll Marathon/"La Grange"	8 Awarded	7; 7	8 Points	Safe
7	Cha Cha Cha Team Dance/"Workin' Day and Night"; Paso Doble/"Free Your Mind"	8; 10/9	8; 8	8; 8	Last to be called Safe
8	Viennese Waltz/"Breathe (2 AM)"; Jive/"Good Golly Miss Molly"	9; 10	9; 9	9; 10	Safe
9 Semi-finals	Samba/"She's Got Me Dancing"; Argentine Tango/"Jai Ho"	10; 10	9; 9	10; 10	Safe
10; Finals	Foxtrot/"Feeling Good"; Freestyle/"Tootsee Roll"; Tango/"If I Had You"; Cha Cha Cha/"Raise Your Glass"	9; 10; 9; 9	9; 9; 8; 9	9; 10; 9; 10	Second Place

=== With Mike Catherwood ===
Average:15.0

Week #	Dance/Song	Judges' score			Result
Week #	Dance/Song	Inaba	Goodman	Tonioli	Result
1	Foxtrot/"Cooler Than Me"	5	4	4	No Elimination
2	Jive/"The Boys Are Back in Town"	6	5	6	Eliminated

=== With Chaz Bono ===
Average:18.8

Week #	Dance/Song	Judges' score			Result
Week #	Dance/Song	Inaba	Goodman	Tonioli	Result
1	Cha-Cha-Cha/"Dancing in the Street"	6	5	6	Safe
2	Quickstep/"Love Is All Around"	6	5	6	Safe
3	Rumba/"Laugh at Me"	6	6	6	Safe
4	Paso Doble/Theme from Rocky	7	7	7	Safe
5	Samba/Get Down on It	7	7	7	Safe
6	Tango/The Phantom of the Opera; Group Broadway Dance/Big Spender & Money Money	7 No	6 Scores	6 Given	Eliminated

=== Music career ===
Schwimmer was featured as a singer on the 2010 single "Red Cup (I Fly Solo)" by Cash Cash. In June 2011, she released her official single titled "Love Soundz" produced by The Monsters and The Strangerz. The song hit the airwaves on "On Air with Ryan Seacrest" on June 17, 2011, and was available on iTunes on June 21.

In 2012, Schwimmer was featured as a singer on the It Boys! single "Burning Up".

== Awards ==
- 2011 – 7th Place: Dancing with the Stars Season 13; Partner: Chaz Bono
- 2011 – 11th Place: Dancing with the Stars Season 12; Partner: Mike Catherwood
- 2010 – 2nd Place: Dancing with the Stars Season 11; Partner: Kyle Massey
- 2009 – 6th Place: Dancing with the Stars Season 9; Partner: Mark Dacascos
- 2009 – 8th Place: Dancing with the Stars Season 8; Partner: Steve-O
- 2008 – 3rd Place: Dancing with the Stars Season 7; Partner: Lance Bass
- 2007 – 1st Place: World Swing Dance Championships, Classic Division; Partner: Benji Schwimmer
- 2007 – 4th Place: Season 3 of So You Think You Can Dance
- 2006 – 1st Place: U.S. National Youth Latin Championships; Partner: Jared Murillo
- 2005 – 3rd Place: U.S. Open Swing Dance Championships; Young Adult Division (14–17 years); Partner: Jared Murillo
- 2004 – 1st Place: U.S. Open Swing Dance Championships; Young Adult Division (14–17 years); Partner: Jared Murillo
- 2003 – 2nd Place: U.S. Open Swing Dance Championships; Young Adult Division (14–17 years); Partner: Jared Murillo
- 2002 – 1st Place: U.S. Open Swing Dance Championships; Young Adult Division (14–17 years); Partner: Jamie Bayard
- 2001 – 2nd Place: U.S. Open Swing Dance Championships; Young Adult Division (14–17 years); Partner: Jamie Bayard
- 2000 – 1st Place: U.S. Open Swing Dance Championships; Young America Division (6–14 years); Partner: Jamie Bayard
- 1998 – 1st Place: U.S. Open Swing Dance Championships; Young America Division (6–12 years); Partner: Blace Thompson
