= Neil Haskell =

American contemporary dancer (born 1987)

- Born: April 16, 1987 (age 39); Buffalo, New York, United States
- Occupation: Contemporary dancer

Neil David Haskell (born April 16, 1987) is an American contemporary dancer and actor. He is best known as a contestant on So You Think You Can Dance where he placed third in the top four. On April 22, 2008, he began performing in the Off-Broadway musical Altar Boyz as Luke. Neil later joined The West Side Story National Tour as Snowboy, and in spring 2012 began touring in the show Bring It On: The Musical as Steven. He also returned as an All-Star in Season 7 of SYTYCD. He played King George in the national touring company of Hamilton: An American Musical.

== Early life and education ==
Haskell was born in Buffalo, New York and raised in nearby Clarence Center. He first started dancing at age five at the David DeMarie Dance Studio in Clarence, New York and at the American Academy of Ballet in Williamsville, New York, And David De Marie Dance studio in Clarence, New york. He also had small roles in movies. At age 15, he began intensive training in ballet at the Chautauqua Institution for three summers. Haskell was raised in Clarence Center, New York and graduated from Clarence High School (Clarence, New York) in 2005. He attended Point Park University for a year, majoring in dance. Haskell has described his dance style as jazz/ballet. He earned the title of "Male Dancer of the Year" at the American Dance Awards in 2005. He got his Equity card the summer before auditioning for So You Think You Can Dance.

== Career ==
He has performed in the Twyla Tharp Broadway show The Times They Are A-Changin', with music by Bob Dylan, and in Pittsburgh Civic Light Opera's performances Grease, 42nd Street, Seven Brides for Seven Brothers, and Beauty and the Beast. Haskell also landed a supporting role in MTV's movie musical The American Mall, which was broadcast and DVD released in summer 2008. In Spring 2008, Haskell, along with former SYTYCD contestants Sabra Johnson and Danny Tidwell, was featured in movmnt magazine's cover story to promote 'Keep it Real', the publication's awareness nonprofit organization.

In April 2008, he began playing the role of "Luke" in the Off-Broadway musical Altar Boyz. He continued playing the role of "Luke" until March 2009, and left to begin working on the new Dolly Parton musical 9 to 5. He was also cast to play the leading role of Jake in the musical F#@king Up Everything in the New York Musical Theater Festival (NYMF 2009), which performs at various times from October 6 through October 17. All performances sold out. In 2010-11, he returned to So You Think You Can Dance Seasons 7 and 8 to dance as an All Star. He was also in the first national tour cast of West Side Story playing the role of Snowboy. After touring with the musical Bring It On based on the movie of the same name, Haskell went on to originate the role of Steven on Broadway at the St. James Theatre during the fall of 2012. Haskell also has a role in The American Mall.

=== So You Think You Can Dance ===
Haskell was paired up with contemporary-hip hop contestant Lauren Gottlieb. The couple danced together until Week 6, when the couples were assigned new pair. Haskell was then partnered with Sara Von Gillern, and debuted their disco routine. Haskell noted that he wants to use his experience on the show as a "springboard for the rest of [his] career".

After making it to the top 10 contestants, Haskell joined his fellow contestants in So You Think You Can Dance's 2007 dance tour that concluded on November 30, 2007. On the August 7, 2008 Season 4 finale, Haskell, along with other contestants from seasons 1–3, joined Season 4's top 20 in a dance number. He also returned as an All-Star in Season 7 of SYTYCD, and again in Season 8.

Week	Partner	Dance	Song	Result
1	Lauren Gottlieb	Salsa	"Friday Night Rhythm"	Safe
2	Lauren Gottlieb	Hip-hop	"The Way I Are" by Timbaland (featuring Keri Hilson and D.O.E.)	Safe
3	Lauren Gottlieb	Tango	"Tanguera" by Sexteto Mayor	Bottom 3 Couples
4	Lauren Gottlieb	Jazz	"Night of the Dancing Flame" by Róisín Murphy	Safe
5	Lauren Gottlieb	Contemporary	"Let the Drummer Kick" by Citizen Cope	Bottom 3 Couples
6	Sara Von Gillern	Disco	"Knock on Wood" by Rachel Stevens	Safe
7	Lacey Schwimmer	Latin jazz	"Acid" by Ray Barretto	Bottom 4
7	Lacey Schwimmer	Contemporary	"Time" by Billy Porter	Bottom 4
8	Sabra Johnson	Jazz	"Sweet Dreams (Are Made of This)" by Eurythmics	Safe
8	Sabra Johnson	Paso Doble	"España cañí" by Juan & Gennaro	Safe
9	Sabra Johnson	Hip hop	"Whine Up"—Kat DeLuna	3rd Place
9	Danny Tidwell	Contemporary	"Are You the One?"—The Presets	3rd Place
9	Lacey Schwimmer	Lindy Hop	"Bill's Bounce"—Bill Elliot Swing Orchestra	3rd Place

=== Broadway ===
In the summer of 2015, Haskell joined the company of Hamilton, the musical by Lin-Manuel Miranda, for its Broadway transfer to the Richard Rodgers Theatre as a swing. He was also a member of the cast of the new Broadway musical, Tuck Everlasting. Haskell rejoined Hamilton soon after, and in June 2016 he replaced Jon Rua as Charles Lee in the show's Ensemble. From August 7–12, 2018, he was the principal King George in the Broadway cast of Hamilton. Since October 2024, Neil has been in the ensemble of the Broadway musical “Death Becomes Her” following an out of town tryout at Chicago’s Cadillac Palace Theater from April 30 to June 2 of the same year.

== Filmography ==
=== Film ===
Year	Title	Role	Notes	Ref.
2020	Hamilton	Swing	Live film recording of the musical	

=== Television ===
Year	Title	Role	Notes	Ref.
2019	Unbreakable Kimmy Schmidt	Cat #2	Episode: "Kimmy Is Rich*!"	
