= Sabra Johnson =

Dutch-American dancer

- Born: Sabra Elise Johnson; July 29, 1987 (age 38); Netherlands
- Occupations: Dancer, choreographer
- Notable credit(s): So You Think You Can Dance; High School Musical

Sabra Elise Johnson (born July 29, 1987) is a Dutch-American dancer and choreographer from Roy, Utah and the season 3 champion of the Fox reality television show So You Think You Can Dance.

She was born in the Netherlands, lived nine years in Germany, and after that, nine years in Utah. She continued to Las Vegas and, deciding to pursue a career in dance, moved to New York City. From there passion has carried her across the world and she now lives in Vietnam dancing, choreographing, and directing.

== Early career ==
Johnson started formal dance training at the age of 16 at Dance Impressions in Bountiful, Utah, under the direction of mother-daughter team Kandee Allen and Vivian Colobella. She then moved down to Las Vegas, NV and trained at the Dance Zone, under the direction of other Colobella daughter Kaydee Francis and partner Jami Artiga. Before training in dance, Johnson had a previous background in gymnastics. Her dance training consists of jazz, ballet, contemporary, and gymnastics, with some experience in hip hop, modern, tap, and theater. Johnson's favorite style of dancing is jazz. Before auditioning for So You Think You Can Dance, Johnson was going on to her fourth year of being a dancer. Johnson had a backup role on the hit film High School Musical as one of the skater dancers in the "Stick to the Status Quo" scene.

== Contestant on So You Think You Can Dance ==
On the first episode of the show, Johnson was paired up with b-boy contestant Dominic Sandoval, and they remained partners for five weeks. Each week, Johnson and her pair were required to reach into the hat with paper slips containing a variety of dance styles. The pair performed a disco routine during week one, a contemporary routine during week two, a rumba during week three, a hip hop during week four, and a jive during week five. The couple landed themselves in the bottom three couples only once which was during the first week. After week five, there were only ten contestants remaining in the competition.

After Johnson made it into the top ten, she was separated from Sandoval because of the rules for the top 10 competition. In week 6, Johnson was randomly paired with contemporary/hip hop contestant Kameron Bink for the next dance where they performed a contemporary routine. Bink was eliminated on the following results show. In week 7, Johnson was randomly paired with ballroom contestant, Pasha Kovalev, for the next performance where they performed a Broadway routine and a quickstep. In week 8, Johnson was randomly paired with contemporary contestant Neil Haskell for the next dances where they performed a jazz routine and a paso doble routine. During the following results show, Johnson was announced as a top 4 contestabt of the season. Throughout the season Johnson was praised for her passion, enthusiasm, prodigious talent, personality, strong dancing and versatility in the different routines. In the end, Johnson garnered more votes than her fellow contestants and was subsequently crowned America's favorite dancer, beating out Danny Tidwell, Neil Haskell, and Lacey Schwimmer.

=== Performances ===
Week	Contestant	Dance	Song	Result
1	Dominic Sandoval	Disco	"No More Tears (Enough Is Enough)"— Donna Summer & Barbra Streisand	Bottom 3
2	Dominic Sandoval	Contemporary	"I'll Stand by You"—The Pretenders	Safe
3	Dominic Sandoval	Rumba	"Stickwitu"—The Pussycat Dolls	Safe
4	Dominic Sandoval	Hip-hop	"Make It Work"—Ne-Yo	Safe
5	Dominic Sandoval	Jive	"I Do the Jerk"—Ryan Shaw	Safe
6	Kameron Bink	Contemporary	"Amazing Grace"—Crystal Lewis	Safe
7	Pasha Kovalev	Broadway	"A Wild Wild Party"— from The Wild Party	Safe
7	Pasha Kovalev	Quickstep	"Mr. Pinstripe Suit"—Big Bad Voodoo Daddy	Safe
8	Neil Haskell	Jazz	"Sweet Dreams (Are Made of This)"—Eurythmics	Safe
8	Neil Haskell	Paso Doble	"España cañí"—Juan & Gennaro	Safe
9	Neil Haskell	Hip-hop	"Whine Up"—Kat DeLuna & Elephant Man	Winner
9	Lacey Schwimmer	Jazz	"Koyal (Songbird)"—Nitin Sawhney	Winner
9	Danny Tidwell	Cha cha	"Gotta Get Down (La Negra Tiene Tumbao) [Spanglish Remix]"—Celia Cruz	Winner

Note: Results highlighted in red indicate that contestants placed in the bottom dancers or couples, but may not have necessarily been eliminated.

== Post SYTYCD ==
Since winning SYTYCD, Johnson has concentrated on teaching rather than dancing, but has expressed a desire to pursue a professional dancing career, possibly even on Broadway. Johnson has made appearances as a performer and teacher at numerous events and workshops, appearing at charity events. As part of those activities, she has travelled abroad to locations such as Iceland (with SYTYCD choreographers Dan Karaty and Shane Sparks and Season 3 runner-up Danny Tidwell), Australia (alongside fellow Season 3 contestant Kameron Bink) and South Africa.

In 2008, Johnson was a pro dancer at the Dance Times Square Showcase benefit held on October 25. She was partnered with SYTYCD contestant Neil Haskell.

In 2009, Johnson began the year as the Special Guest Artist at the Merrimack Hall Second Annual Evening of Dance in Huntsville, Alabama. (SYTYCD Season 4 winner Joshua Allen taught a master hip-hop class there a few days later.) She later appeared at the St. Louis Auto Show and was a member of the Cedar Lake Contemporary Ballet company in New York City for a time.

Johnson taught dance master classes for the East Coast Movement on August 25, 2010, along with Kameron Bink.

In addition Johnson has taught Jazz dance internationally, and as of 2017 was working closely with the Dancenter in Ho Chi Minh City, Vietnam. Through the Dancenter she formed a working partnership with the Urban Dance Group (UDG) where she is choreographing and directing her first full-length interactive dance show, 'Between Us'.

== See also ==
- List of dancers

Preceded by Benji Schwimmer	Winner of So You Think You Can Dance; 2007	Succeeded by Joshua Allen
