= Buddy Schwimmer =

American dancer (1949–2023)

Harry Daniel "Buddy" Schwimmer (February 22, 1949 – September 13, 2023) was a West Coast Swing dancer and choreographer, credited with inventing nightclub two-step in the 1960s.

== Biography ==
Schwimmer was born in Gary, Indiana, and began dancing in 1953. He introduced the nightclub two step in 1964.

Known as the "King of Swing", Schwimmer was inducted into the California Swing Hall of Fame and World Swing Dance Council Hall of Fame.

On July 31, 2006, Schwimmer's 5-6-7-8 Dance Studio suffered a major fire while Schwimmer was in Los Angeles watching his son, Benji, compete on the program So You Think You Can Dance. The studio resumed full operations in September 2006.

Schwimmer died September 13, 2023, of cardiac arrest.

== Children ==
As of 2008, Schwimmer's son, Benji Schwimmer was an eight-time United States Showcase Champion of West Coast Swing.

Buddy Schwimmer's daughter, Lacey Schwimmer has won national dance championships and came in fourth in season three of So You Think You Can Dance. Lacey has danced for six seasons as one of the professionals on Dancing with the Stars. Buddy appeared in the 13th season to help Lacey's partner Chaz Bono.

== Bibliography ==
- "5-6-7-8 reopens, Benji considers offers", September 7, 2006, Redlandsdailyfacts.com
- San Bernardino Sun, September 15, 2006
