= Hunter Johnson (choreographer) =

American ballroom dancer and choreographer

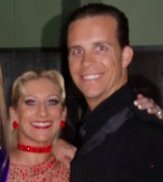
- Hunter with Maria Zee
- Born: Houston, Texas, United States
- Occupation: Choreographer
- Spouse: Maria Zee
- Children: Parker Chase Johnson. Carter Colt Johnson

Hunter Johnson is a ballroom dancer and choreographer.

== Biography ==
Johnson met his partner and wife while teaching ballroom dance at Londance in Southern California. They compete in the professional American-style division, and have opened an Arthur Murray dance studio and settled down in Cypress, Texas. They continue to travel, doing shows and coaching.

They have been featured dancers on the PBS series America's Ballroom Challenge and choreographers on season 3, season 4 and Season 5 of the Fox dance competition-reality show So You Think You Can Dance.

=== Marriage and children ===
Hunter Johnson is married to his current dance partner, Maria Johnson, and they have two children Parker Chase Johnson and Carter Colt Johnson.

== Awards ==
- 2006 Open to the World Ballroom Champions
- U.S. Open Smooth Finalists, 2000-2007
- Winners of over 25 Open Professional Titles
- Arthur Murray Ballroom Champions
