= Movmnt =

American dance magazine

movmnt
- movmnt magazine #6, cover dated February 2008
- Editor in Chief: David Benaym
- Categories: fashion, dance, music, pop culture, Lifestyle
- Frequency: Quarterly
- Publisher: David Benaym
- First issue: June 2006
- Final issue: 2013
- Company: e-maprod Inc.
- Country: United States
- Based in: New York City
- Language: English
- Website: www.movmnt.com Website

movmnt was an urban-leaning lifestyle magazine which was co-founded in 2006 by David Benaym and Danny Tidwell. The magazine featured columns by Mario Spinetti, Mia Michaels, Robert Battle, Debbie Allen, Alisan Porter, Rasta Thomas, and Frank Conway. Both Travis Wall and Ivan Koumaev were the guest contributors to the publication, which published photographs by Gary Land, Dave Hill, James Archibald Houston, and Alison Jackson. The magazine ceased publication in 2013.
