= DZihan & Kamien =

Austrian downtempo/acid jazz music duo

dZihan & Kamien
- Origin: Sarajevo, Bosnia and Herzegovina, Austria, Switzerland, Germany
- Genres: Acid jazz Downtempo; Trip hop
- Years active: 1996–2010, 2018-
- Labels: Couch Records, Six Degrees Records
- Members: Vlado Džihan; Mario Kamien
- Website: www.dzihankamien.com

dZihan & Kamien (/ˈdʒiːhɑːn ... ˈkæmiɛn/) are a downtempo and acid jazz music duo based in Vienna, Austria. Their sound has been described as having "jazzy texture, trip-hop rhythms and Eastern ambience." Their first production single, Der Bauch, released in 1996 under the name MC Sultan, was popular in European clubs and was included on several compilations.

dZihan & Kamien's debut album, Freaks & Icons, was released in 2000 on their label, Couch Records. The group followed their debut with two more albums, Refreaked in 2001 and Gran Riserva, with a more jazzy sound, in 2002. All three albums were released in the US under the label of Six Degrees Records.

== History ==
Vlado Džihan, from Sarajevo, Bosnia and Herzegovina, was raised in a musical family and was known in the local scene as a drummer. He recorded music for the film Arizona Dream, starring Johnny Depp and Faye Dunaway. Mario Kamien, German-born and raised in Switzerland, met dZihan while they were studying in Vienna. Both were interested in traditional Arabic music and Trip hop, and combined their interests and musical backgrounds in the production of their first album, Freaks & Icons.

On October 16, 2010, dZihan & Kamien announced a plan to break up. They announced the release of their last album, "Lost and Found," a collection of B-sides, exclusives and other unreleased tracks from 1998 to 2003.

On September 21, 2018, dZihan & Kamien released a new single, "I've Seen..."

On 12 March 2021, dZihan & Kamien released a new album titled "IV".
