= Danny Tidwell =

American dancer (1984–2020)

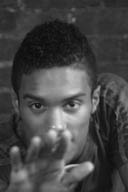
- Born: Daniel Arnold Tidwell; August 1, 1984; Norfolk, Virginia, United States
- Died: March 6, 2020 (aged 35); Georgia
- Spouse: David Benaym (m. 2014)
- Career
- Dances: Contemporary, ballet
- Relatives: Travis Wall (adoptive-brother)

Daniel Arnold Tidwell (August 1, 1984 – March 6, 2020) was an American dancer and actor best known for being the runner-up on Fox's third season of So You Think You Can Dance in 2007.

Tidwell began dancing as a child, at first focusing on jazz before changing to ballet while attending Kirov Academy of Ballet at the age of fifteen. He worked in elite companies, including the American Ballet Theatre. He also performed the works of renowned choreographers, including Debbie Allen, William Forsythe and Mia Michaels. He was Travis Wall's brother, a runner-up of the second season of So You Think You Can Dance. Tidwell was the artistic director of Movmnt Magazine and was a soloist dancer with Norwegian National Opera and Ballet in Oslo.

Tidwell died on March 6, 2020, from injuries sustained in a car crash.

== Early life ==
Danny Tidwell was born in Norfolk, Virginia and raised in nearby Virginia Beach. His early childhood was turbulent, and he sometimes got into trouble. Tidwell started dancing at the age of eight in an after-school program for at-risk youth. Local dance instructor Vicky Cooke took notice of the "little bit of a kid in a straddle, trying to reach his fingers to his toes", and after the program closed, Cooke mentioned the boy to Denise Wall. The two women decided to accept him to their studio, Denise Wall's Dance Energy, for free. Over the next couple of years, Wall took a personal interest in Tidwell, and by the time he was ten, he was calling Wall "Mom" and her other sons (Scotty, Travis, Tyler and Shannon) his brothers. She found out that the boy would often walk part or all of the ten miles (16 km) home after dance class, had little adult supervision outside of the studio, and, at one point, had not been registered in school for months. He lived with his biological mother and two sisters until he was ten, before moving in with Wall; she officially took custody of Tidwell when he was twelve years old.

== Early career and training ==
Commenting on his early days in training, he said, "I hated ballet and would skip every chance I got." More interested in jazz as a child, the flips, turns, and chance for expression appealed to him. However, his real motivation was competition, which would prepare him for his future endeavors more than he could have known at the time. "I was a competition kid. We used to do competitions every other weekend," he told Dance Magazine.

In his early teens, Tidwell met several outstanding young dancers, including his favorite - Rasta Thomas, and it motivated him to take his dance to a new height. He set the goal to attend the Kirov Academy of Ballet (also known as Universal Ballet Academy) in Washington, DC and, at the age of fifteen, he was invited to study at Kirov on scholarship. It turned out to be up to that time, what he calls, "the best and the worst experience" of his life. He began receiving high-level classical ballet training with Vladimir Djouloukhadze and Anatoli Kucheruk, at first to improve his jazz dance. However, he soon found that the difficulty of ballet was the perfect outlet for his need of a constant challenge, and switched concentrations - a late start by ballet standards. While excelling in dance, he found the environment at Kirov demanding and isolating. As summer approached, he prepared for and participated in the Shanghai International Ballet Competition and took home a silver medal (no gold was awarded that year). However, the stress of Kirov had been too much, and he quit the school after the competition.

After leaving, Tidwell got the opportunity to perform principal roles in two original shows created by Debbie Allen, including Dreams and Pearl, which he performed at the Kennedy Center in Washington, D.C., in front of President George W. Bush. He also had a two-month stint at the School of American Ballet, where he found both the teachers and students unaccepting and remote. In 2002, Tidwell submitted his audition tape to participate in the prestigious, quadrennial USA International Ballet Competition (USA IBC). He was invited to compete, and went on to receive the silver medal. Unbeknownst to Tidwell, the win would launch his career.

== Career ==
Mistress of Ceremonies of the USA IBC, Anna-Marie Holmes, passed Tidwell's application videotape to Kevin McKenzie, artistic director of the elite American Ballet Theatre (ABT). Upon viewing it, McKenzie suggested to John Meehan (the ABT Education Director) that he offer Tidwell a place in the ABT Studio Company (its apprentice wing). Just two months later, Tidwell joined the Studio Company - without an audition - and soon after, in May 2003, he was promoted into their corps de ballet just before the ABT's 2003 season began at the Metropolitan Opera House. He performed many works in the classical ballet repertory, and although only a corps member, he was given soloists roles in Le Spectre de la Rose and the peasant pas de deux from Giselle. Tidwell was a company member of the ABT's 2003 production of the Swan Lake that was later broadcast on the program Great Performances: Dance in America and released on DVD. Despite his success, he was beginning to find the unremitting rigors of being in a company confining. Tidwell left the ABT in 2004, shocking the dance world and those who knew him.

Over the next two years, Tidwell dabbled in various pursuits. He performed contemporary works by choreographers Nacho Duato, Jiri Killian, William Forsythe, Kirk Peterson and Robert Hill. In 2005, Tidwell was featured as one of Dance Magazine’s 25 to Watch (appearing on the cover) and Pointe Magazine's Top 10 VIP. He was a guest principal dancer in Ballet Lubbock's Nutcracker in December 2005. That August, Tidwell taught in the National Dance Foundation of Bermuda's International Summer Intensive program, run in partnership with American Ballet Theatre. Continuing to work in dance education, Tidwell was on the faculty of JUMP and was invited to guest teach at many schools and studios across the country.

Also in 2005, Tidwell, along with publisher David Benaym, photographer Roger Moenks, and choreographer Lauren Adams, co-created Moving Still, a "life performance" in the format of a combination of a live show and a photography art/fashion book. Moving Still led to the creation of movmnt magazine in June 2006, a quarterly with a focus on fashion, dance, emerging music artists, and social issues that Tidwell co-founded with Benaym. Tidwell served as the magazine's Artistic Advisor, and he eventually posed for the cover in the Spring 2008 issue along with former SYTYCD contestant Sabra Johnson.

In 2006, Tidwell joined Complexions Contemporary Ballet for a season under the direction of company founders Dwight Rhoden and Desmond Richardson. That summer he was invited back to the USA IBC to perform in the opening ceremonies. He left Complexions after a year.

During this period, Tidwell would often return home from New York to Virginia Beach, to be "rejuvenated" and teach at the studio with his mother. While still active in dance, Tidwell's career was losing focus, and his mother feared that he was losing his love for dance. That changed in late 2006 when the two went to see Tidwell's brother, Travis, perform in the So You Think You Can Dance tour in Madison Square Garden. Travis had come in second place during the previous season, and was heavily featured in the touring show. His mother recalled, "At Madison Square Garden, Danny looked at me with tears in his eyes and said, 'I want to do that. My brother's up there on that stage, dancing and living, and I want to do that.'" The following season he attended the show's open auditions in New York City.

=== So You Think You Can Dance ===
In June 2007, based on his New York City audition, Tidwell was asked directly to Las Vegas callbacks without a second audition. Quickly, however, judges such as contemporary dance choreographer Mia Michaels and hip hop choreographer Shane Sparks, found Tidwell to be arrogant, with the latter saying Tidwell acted as if he were "God's gift to the world." The allegation was a recurring issue throughout the show, and Tidwell found his reputation as a gifted dancer at odds with his aloof demeanor. Nigel Lythgoe (head judge and executive producer) for his part found the accusations tiresome, responding to choreographer Adam Shankman's comment on Tidwell's arrogance with, "I think you're talking crap." The New York Times, in an article titled "So He Knows He Can Dance: A Prince Among Paupers", praised the technically talented Tidwell, and noted that "his unflinching poise and his chiseled, determined jaw" can be misread on television. The article continued, "If Mr. Tidwell is different from the other dancers on the show, the distinction has as much to do with his dignity as with his impeccable line and his ability to infuse slight choreography with authority...He never mugs for the camera. It's sad, yet hardly a surprise, that such behavior could be taken as superciliousness." The aforementioned Sparks later retracted his previous statement and said Tidwell could "be one of the greats."

Selected as one of the top twenty, he was paired up with ballroom dancer, Anya Garnis. They were a judge favorite early on, with guest-judge Debbie Allen remarking "I can't imagine you all not being at the very end of the competition". The couple first found themselves in the bottom three couples after they danced a hip-hop choreographed by Dan Karaty on the third show. The following night, Tidwell "danced for his life" in a contemporary solo that allowed him to stay in the competition. On the following broadcast, the couple danced a contemporary routine by Tyce Diorio but again they found themselves in the bottom three. However, Tidwell had yet another successful solo, and consequently moved on. Once in the top twelve, Tidwell and Garnis performed a Foxtrot routine choreographed by Jean-Marc Généreux. After being in the bottom three for the third time in a row, Garnis was asked to leave the competition, while Tidwell made it into the top ten, earning him a spot in the planned 2007 So You Think You Can Dance Tour. He then was partnered with (in chronological order) Lacey Schwimmer, Sara Von Gillern, and Lauren Gottlieb without ever being "in danger" again. He eventually made it to the final four contestants, placing him in the finale. During the finale, Danny performed a solo to "We are the Champions", as sung by Gavin DeGraw, that received effusive praise and the only standing ovation from the judges, with Lythgoe saying that "every young man watching this show should aspire to be as good as you". The following night, he finished the competition as runner-up behind winner Sabra Johnson.

Reflecting on the season, Tidwell said, "I have all kinds of dance styles now, connections to choreographers and music options." He also concluded, "I found that I love to dance again."

The tour began September 21, 2007 in Albany, New York, and concluded November 30 in Reno, Nevada, for a total of fifty dates. The tour stopped in Tidwell's home of Hampton Roads on October 16, 2007.

Performance review

Week	Partner	Dance	Song	Result
1	Anya Garnis	Jive	"Girlfriend"—Avril Lavigne	Safe
2	Anya Garnis	Viennese Waltz	"You and Me"—Lifehouse	Safe
3	Anya Garnis	Hip hop	"Oh Timbaland"—Timbaland	Safe
4	Anya Garnis	Contemporary	"Apologize"—OneRepublic	Safe
5	Anya Garnis	Fox trot	"It Had to Be You"—Brian Evans	Safe
6	Lacey Schwimmer	Samba	"Hip Hip Chin Chin" – Club des Belugas	Safe
7	Sara Von Gillern	Argentine Tango	"Whatever Lola Wants"—Sarah Vaughan and Gotan Project	Safe
7	Sara Von Gillern	Hip hop	"Push It"—Salt-N-Pepa	Safe
8	Lauren Gottlieb	Contemporary	"Then You Look At Me"—Celine Dion	Safe
8	Lauren Gottlieb	Disco	"Don't Leave Me This Way"—The Communards	Safe
9	Lacey Schwimmer	Viennese Waltz	"Keep Holding On" – Avril Lavigne	Runner-Up
9	Neil Haskell	Contemporary	"Are You The One"—The Presets	Runner-Up
9	Sabra Johnson	Cha cha	"Gotta Get Down (La Negra Tiene Tumbao) [Spanglish Remix]"—Celia Cruz	Runner-Up

Note: Pink results indicate that he was in the bottom three.

=== Post SYTYCD ===
Tidwell appeared on the February 2008 cover of movmnt magazine, with Sabra Johnson, as part of an article about "Keep It Real", the magazine's non-profit organization.

Tidwell, along with many previous finalists of So You Think You Can Dance, performed during American Idol's second annual Idol Gives Back charity event in April 2008. At the time, Nigel Lythgoe produced both shows. Tidwell was a guest teacher on the 2007-2008 tour of JUMP: the Alternative Convention. In September 2009, Tidwell had his Broadway debut as a castmember in Memphis. He performed in April 2010 on Dancing with the Stars with New York City Ballet principal, Tiler Peck, on a piece choreographed by Travis Wall. Beginning in September 2010, Tidwell resided in Oslo where he was hired as a soloist for Norway's National Ballet.

== Personal life ==
Tidwell married journalist David Benaym in May 2014.

== Death ==
Tidwell died as a result of a car accident in Georgia, on March 6, 2020.

== Awards and recognitions ==
- Silver Medal, Shanghai International Ballet Competition (2001)
- National Outstanding Male Dancer, New York City Dance Alliance (2002)
- Men's Junior Silver Medal, USA International Ballet Competition (2002)
- Named one of Dance Magazine's "25 to Watch" (2005)

== See also ==
- List of dancers
