= Heidi Groskreutz =

American ballroom dancer and reality TV contestant

- Born: September 3, 1981 (age 45); California, U.S.
- Occupation: Dancer
- Spouse: Donnie Burns (m. 2008)
- Children: Domenico Burns

Heidi Elizabeth Groskreutz (born September 3, 1981) is an American ballroom dancer, specializing in the fields of Latin and swing dancing. She is known for making the final in the second season of the Fox TV series So You Think You Can Dance.

== Biography ==
Heidi Groskreutz, born September 3, 1981, is a dancer from Cliffside Park, New Jersey, and raised in Newport Beach, California. She specializes in Latin and swing dancing, and as of 2006, is a six-time U.S. Open Swing Dance champion. She has also the winner of the World Invitation Swing Dance Championship and many other top NASDE events. Popularly, she is best known for being a contestant in the second season of the So You Think You Can Dance competition (which was won by her cousin Benji Schwimmer) and placing fourth.

Since six years old, Groskreutz and her cousin Benji, longtime dance partners, have been winning national swing dance titles together. They are both Mormons, and when Schwimmer left to serve a mission in Mexico, Groskreutz began competing with a new partner, Dmitry Chaplin. After Schwimmer's return from Mexico, all three of them auditioned for the second season of So You Think You Can Dance, and all proceeded to the top 20 contestants. At first, Groskreutz was partnered with contestant Ryan Rankine, and then later with Travis Wall. She was often cited by the judges as the "most improved" contestant during the course of the show, and as a dancer that can"take anything that is thrown[at her]." Nigel Lythgoe stated "Heidi you are the best partner dancer of the girls, just as Benji is for the boys, you're both incredible."

She was also one of the dancers in the tour based on the show. Heidi and Benji danced on Fox's New Year's Eve show and talked about their instructional dance DVD, appeared on Much Music on Demand in Canada, the Tyra Banks Show, Teen Choice Awards, "E", Extra, Megan Mullally Show. She is also the cousin of Lacey Schwimmer

In 2008, she married former Latin dance world champion Donnie Burns.

On July 23, 2009, Heidi reunited with former season two contestant Travis Wall, on the 100th episode of So You Think You Can Dance to recreate their Emmy award winning piece, The Bench. She also danced with Wade Robson and the other top ten contestants from season 2, recreating "Rama Lama" — another Emmy award winning piece on the same 100th episode.

== Awards ==
- 1990 US Open, Young America Div. (ages 6–11), 2nd Place, partner Benji Schwimmer
- 1991 US Open, Young America Div. (ages 6–11), 1st Place, partner Benji Schwimmer
- 1992 US Open, Young America Div. (ages 6–12), 3rd Place, partner Benji Schwimmer
- 1993 US Open, Young America Div. (ages 6–12), 4th Place, partner Benji Schwimmer
- 1994 US Open, Young America Div. (ages 6–12), 2nd Place, partner Benji Schwimmer
- 2001 US Open Swing Dance Championship, Showcase Division, partner Benji Schwimmer
- 2002 US Open Swing Dance Championship, Showcase Division, partner Benji Schwimmer
- 2005 US Open Swing Dance Championship, Showcase Division, partner Benji Schwimmer Video Clip
