= Anya Garnis =

Latvian ballroom dancer

- Born: Anna Garnis; 26 May 1982 (age 44); Latvia
- Occupation: Ballroom dancer
- Television: So You Think You Can Dance; Strictly Come Dancing

Anna "Anya" Garnis (Russian: Анна "Аня" Гарнис; born 26 May 1982) is a Latvian ballroom dancer based in New York City. In 2007 she was a contestant on the American reality television show So You Think You Can Dance.

In 2000, Garnis moved to the US with Pasha Kovalev to dance professionally. She was a top 20 contestant on So You Think You Can Dance, season 3, and went on to take part in the live tour. She was brought back to the program to take part as an all-star. Kovalev and Garnis were also the lead dancers in Burn the Floor. She was then the lead dancer in Dancing With the Stars Live in Las Vegas. Garnis rejoined Kovalev on the cast of Strictly Come Dancing as a professional dancer for series 11 in 2013, in which she was partnered with Casualty actor Patrick Robinson. They reached the semi-finals, before losing the dance-off to Natalie Gumede and Artem Chigvintsev.

Series	Partner	Place	Average
11	Patrick Robinson	5th	32.6

== Performances with Patrick Robinson ==
Week	Dance & song	Judges' score				Total	Result
Week	Dance & song	Horwood	Bussell	Goodman	Tonioli	Total	Result
1	Jive / "Runaway Baby"	7	7	7	7	28	No Elimination
2	Tango / "Beat It"	6	7	7	7	27	Safe
3	Foxtrot / "Let There Be Love"	6	7	7	7	27	Safe
4	Cha-cha-cha / "Mercy"	8	8	9	8	33	Safe
5	Salsa / "Wings"	6	8	7	7	28	Bottom two
6	Quickstep / "Man with the Hex"	8	9	9	8	34	Safe
7	American Smooth / "It Had to Be You"	9	10	9	9	37	Safe
8	Samba / "Copacabana"	8	9	9	9	35	Safe
9	Viennese waltz / "A New Day Has Come"	8	8	8	8	32	Safe
10	Charleston / "Chitty Chitty Bang Bang"	8	10	10	10	38	Safe
11	Rumba / "When I Was Your Man"	8	10	9	9	36	Bottom two
11	Swing-a-thon / "Do You Love Me"	Awarded	5	extra	points	41	Bottom two
12	Waltz / "Unchained Melody"; Paso doble / "Because the Night"	9; 7	9; 8	9; 9	9; 9	36; 33	Eliminated

Garnis returned to Strictly Come Dancing in Week 11, Series 13 to replace Ola Jordan for professional dances only. Her partner in those dances is Pasha Kovalev.
