= Melanie LaPatin =

- Born: March 17, 1960 (age 66); Brooklyn, New York, U.S
- Occupations: Ballroom dancer and Choreographer

Melanie LaPatin is a United States Professional Ballroom Dance Champion and choreographer, best known for her choreography work on Fox's "So You Think You Can Dance" and ABC's "Dancing With the Stars." Originally from Brooklyn, New York, LaPatin formed a professional partnership with Tony Meredith in 1981, marrying him in 1989. Together they traveled the world, competing, coaching, performing, lecturing, choreographing, and represented the United States in twelve Professional World Latin-American Dance Championships, winning over 100 championship titles. LaPatin eventually moved to back to New York to coach and open a Latin and Ballroom dance studio, Dance Times Square.

== Competition and titles ==
With Meredith, LaPatin represented the United States for over a decade in the World Latin American Dance Championships and has taken home over 100 championship titles. Their titles include: The United States Professional Latin Champions, Dirty Dancing Champions, 1999 DanceSport World Cup Champions, Four-time Champions of the North American Latin Championships, The World Trophy Title Holders, American-Swing World Cabaret Dance Champions, Three-time Champions of the "Championship Ballroom Dancing" (Sponsor, PBS), Copacabana Mambo Marathon Finalists, and Twelve-time United States Representatives for the World Latin Championships.

== Choreography ==
LaPatin is a coach of top dancers and a choreographer for actors in film, television and Broadway. She has choreographed and appeared on film including Dance with Me, The Thomas Crown Affair, Let It Be Me and The Last Days of Disco. She has appeared as a choreographer on FOX's So You Think You Can Dance and CTV's So You Think You Can Dance Canada.

As a dance coach and choreographer, LaPatin has worked with some of the most renowned film and television personalities including Robin Williams, Russell Crowe, Emma Watson, Cameron Diaz, Megan Mullally, Matthew Morrison, Pierce Brosnan, Renee Russo, Vanessa Williams, Tim Robbins, Mary Steenburgen, Sonya Brava, Susan Sarandon, Steven Dorff, Patrick Stewart, Leslie Caron, Jennifer Beals, Harvey Keitel, Campbell Scott, Rob Schneider and Barbara Walters. She also appeared in and choreographed the movie Leading Ladies, playing the leading role of Sheri Campari, a mother who swears off men and lives vicariously through her daughters. LaPatin was also the Associate Choreographer for the feature film, "What to Expect When You're Expecting."

In 2008, she choreographed a photo shoot for Harper's Bazaar called "Dancing with the Designers" that featured Jessica Biel and high-end designers Vera Wang, Oscar de la Renta, Diane Von Furstenberg, Calvin Klein, and Zac Posen.

== Dance Times Square Studio ==
Upon retiring from the competitive floor in 1998, LaPatin and Meredith created Dance Times Square Studio in New York's Times Square. Despite their subsequent amicable divorce, they continue to choreograph for film, television, Broadway and a new generation of competitive dancers, and celebrities. Vogue magazine called the studio "the most fashionable place in New York City to learn to dance..."

== See also ==
- U.S. National Dancesport Champions (Professional Latin)
- So You Think You Can Dance (10 seasons)
- America's Ballroom Challenge
