= Benji Schwimmer =

American dancer and choreographer

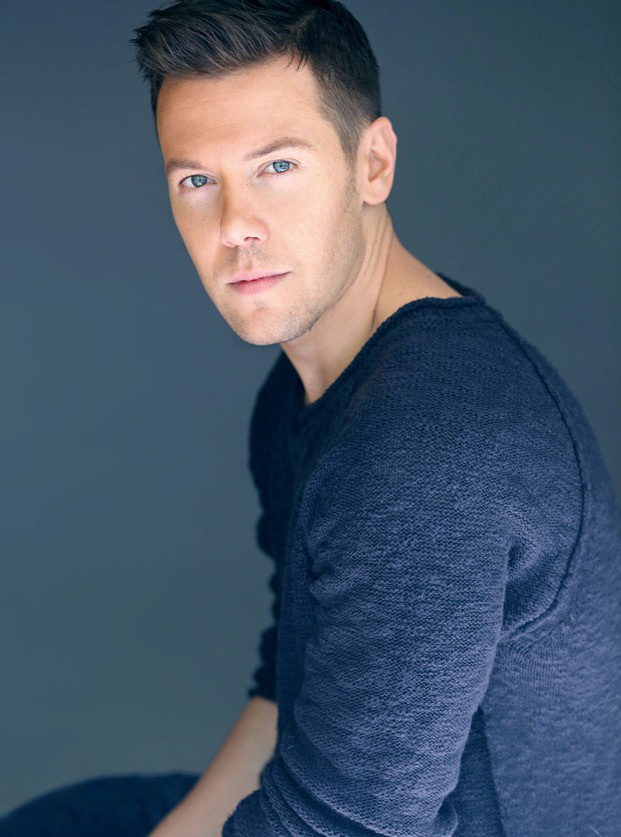
- Born: Benjiman Daniel Schwimmer; January 18, 1984 (age 42); Newport Beach, California, U.S.
- Occupations: actor; choreographer; dancer
- Years active: 2006–present
- Television: So You Think You Can Dance
- Parent: Buddy Schwimmer (father)
- Relatives: Lacey Schwimmer (sister); Heidi Groskreutz; (cousin)
- Website: www.benjiwashere.com

Benjiman Daniel Schwimmer (born January 18, 1984) is an American professional dancer, choreographer, actor and director. He was the winner of the second season of So You Think You Can Dance (2006) and has choreographed for both the U.S. and the international versions of the show. He is the only dancer in the world to hold World titles in solo, partner and group divisions at the same time. Schwimmer works on TV, film and stage both in front and behind camera. He was the specialties choreographer for Quentin Tarantino's "Once Upon a Time in Hollywood".

== Early life ==
Schwimmer was born on January 18, 1984, in Newport Beach, California, and grew up in a Latter-day Saint (Mormon) household in Moreno Valley, California. He is the son of choreographer and West Coast Swing dancer Buddy Schwimmer. His mother, Laurie Schwimmer, and sister, Lacey Schwimmer, are also renowned partner and solo dancers.

He began acting at two, landing nationwide commercials for McDonald's, Pizza Hut, Power Wheels and a guest stint on Full House.

He started competing at five years old. He finished his studies early, and then taught dance at 17 years of age for one semester at Crafton Hills College in Yucaipa.

Schwimmer and his cousin, Heidi Groskreutz (Top 4 finalist on the same season of So You Think You Can Dance), are also U.S. Open and World Showcase Swing champions. Schwimmer put dancing on hold to serve a two-year mission for the Church of Jesus Christ of Latter-day Saints (LDS Church) in the Mexican state of Oaxaca. He returned afterwards to the dance circuit. He founded D.E.M.A.N.D., a non-profit organization that helps the less fortunate and provides health care for dancers with HIV/AIDS and other illnesses, and was a co-owner of 5678 Dance Studio in Redlands since 2011.

== Career ==
After his two-year mission and stint on So You Think You Can Dance tours, Schwimmer reclaimed his titles as both US and World Swing Champion with a new partner, Kellese Key in 2008. He has never lost a routine competition.

Schwimmer also appeared in the independent film, Love N' Dancing, starring Amy Smart. He was the cover story in a 10-page spread in "Dancer Magazine", January 9 issue, which featured his own photography. Schwimmer also costarred in the comedy "Leading Ladies".

Paula Abdul hired Schwimmer as her creative director and choreographer for her final performance on American Idol and for her opening show for VH1's Divas:Live '09. He also danced alongside her in both performances.

Working with his father, he choreographed the short program of American figure skater Jeremy Abbott, which was first performed at the 2011 Cup of China. Benji has since choreographed for two different Winter Olympics, including Adam Rippon's "O" .

In 2018, Schwimmer announced his retirement from competing at The Open Swing Dance Champions, being the only dancer to win 14 World Titles with four different partners, never taking a loss.

== Personal life ==
Schwimmer is gay. He came out publicly in 2012, after completing his choice of reparative therapy, struggling with his sexuality for a number of years. The catalyst for his decision was the death by suicide of two gay friends. He has since left the LDS Church and publicly criticized their policies against members of the LGBT community.

== Awards ==
- 1991 US Open, Young America Div. (ages 6–11), 1st place, partner Heidi Groskreutz
- 1992 "Future Stars" Champion, Sabado Gigante (TV), partner Heidi Groskreutz
- 1993 "Future Stars" Champion, Sabado Gigante (TV), partner Heidi Groskreutz
- 1994 World Swing Dance Championships Youth Division, 1st place partner Heidi Groskreutz
- 1995 World Swing Dance Championships Youth Division, 1st place partner Heidi Groskreutz
- 1995 US Open Swing Dance Championships, Adult Team Division, 1st place Jump Start
- 1995 Feather Award "Outstanding Dancer(youth)"
- 1995 World Swing Dance Championships, Adult Team Division, 1st place, Jump Start
- 1996 World Swing Dance Championships, Youth Division, 1st place partner Heidi Groskreutz
- 1996 World Swing Dance Championships, Adult Team Division, 1st place, Jump Start
- 1997 Skippy Blair "Footsteps Award"
- 1998 Sabado Gigante's "Best Dance Couple" (multiple winner), partner Heidi Groskreutz
- 1999 World Swing Dance Championships, Youth Division, 1st place partner Heidi Groskreutz
- 1999 World Swing Dance Championships, Team Division, 1st place, Jump Start
- 2001 World Swing Dance Championships, Youth Division, 1st place partner Heidi Groskreutz
- 2001 US Open Swing Dance Championship, Showcase Division, 1st place, partner Heidi Groskreutz
- 2002 USA Sing Net "Person of the Year"
- 2002 US Open Swing Dance Championship, Showcase Division, 1st place, partner Heidi Groskreutz
- 2005 US Open Swing Dance Championship, Showcase Division, 1st place, partner Heidi Groskreutz
- 2005 US Open Swing Dance Championships, Team Division, 1st place Jump Start 2
- 2006 SO YOU THINK YOU CAN DANCE, 1st place, "America's Favorite Dancer", after a tally of 16 million votes for the Finale
- 2007 - 1st place: World Swing Dance Championships, Classic Division; Partner: Lacey Schwimmer
- 2008 LAPD Jack and Jill (improv) Championships, 1st place, partner Deborah Szekely
- 2008 USA Grand Nationals Showcase Division, 1st place, partner Kellese Key
- 2008 USA Grand Nationals Cabaret Division, 1st place
- 2008 Dallas D.A.N.C.E. Cabaret Division, 1st place
- 2008 US Open Swing Dance Championship, Showcase Division, 1st place, partner Kellese Key
- 2009 US Open Swing Dance Championship, Showcase Division, 1st place, partner Kellese Key
- 2010 US Open Swing Dance Championship, Showcase Division, 1st place, partner Torri Smith
- 2011 US Open Swing Dance Championship, Showcase Division, 1st place, partner Torri Smith
- 2012 US Open Swing Dance Championship, Showcase Division, 1st place, partner Torri Smith
- 2013 US Open Swing Dance Championship, Showcase Division, 1st place, partner Torri Smith
- 2014 US Open Swing Dance Championship, Showcase Division, 1st place, partner Torri Smith
- 2015 US Open Swing Dance Championship, Showcase Division, 1st place, partner Nicole Clonch
- 2016 US Open Swing Dance Championship, Showcase Division, 1st place, partner Nicole Clonch
- 2017 US Open Swing Dance Championship, Showcase Division, 1st place, partner Nicole Clonch
- 2018 US Open Swing Dance Championship, Showcase Division, 1st place, partner Nicole Clonch

== See also ==
- List of dancers

Preceded by Nick Lazzarini	Winner of So You Think You Can Dance; 2006	Succeeded by Sabra Johnson
