= Krissie Illing =

English dancer, clown, comedian, and ventriloquist

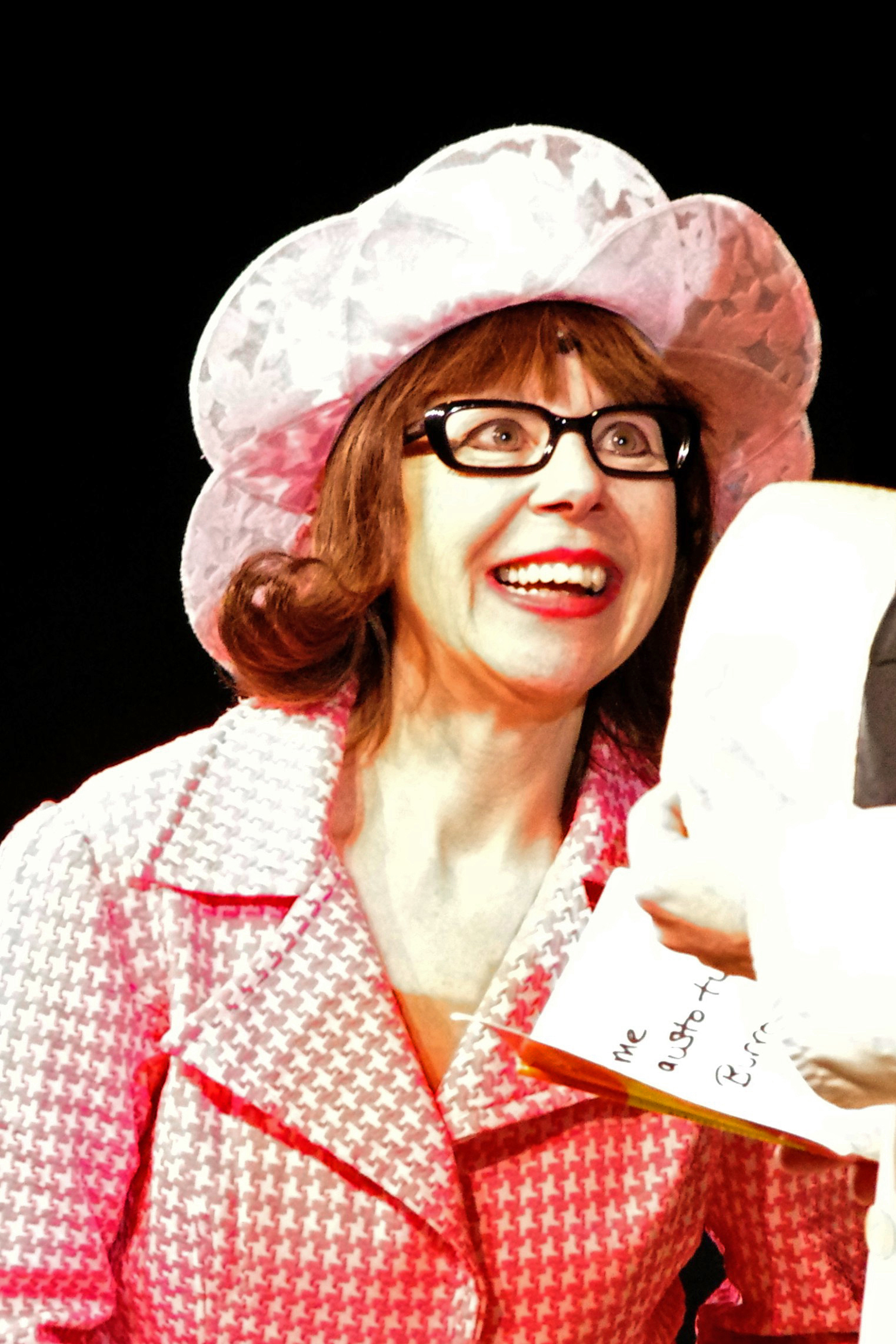
- Illing in 2014
- Born: Christine Elisabeth Illing; 8 December 1956 (age 69); Beckenham, Bromley, London, England
- Occupations: Comedian, ventriloquist
- Spouse: Chris Adams

Krissie Illing (born 8 December 1956) is an English dancer, mime, clown, comedian, and ventriloquist.

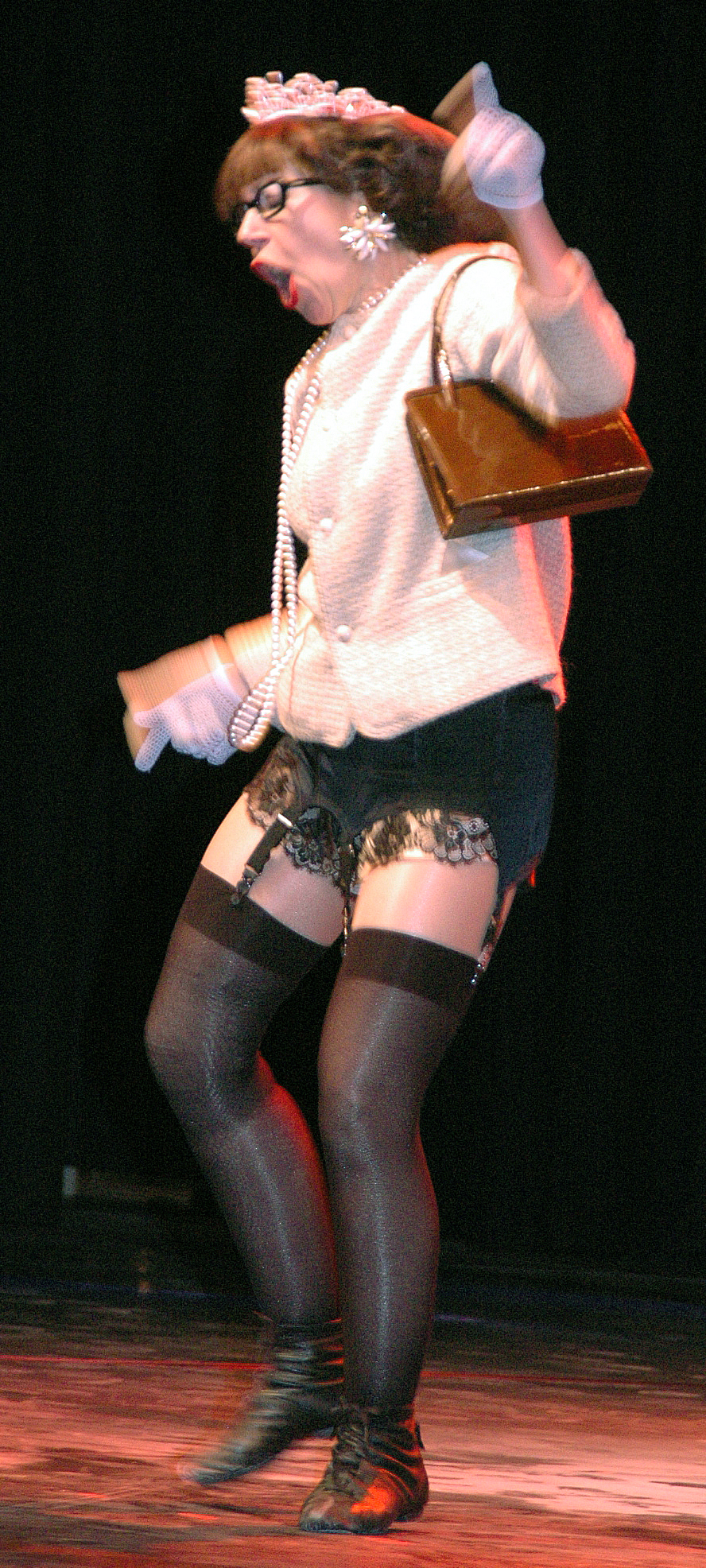
Krissie Illing performing on Freiburg-Kulturbörse 2007

== Biography ==
Illing took ballet dancing lessons as a child. She studied dance at the Royal Academy of Dance in London and embraces tap dance and jazz dance at the Covent Garden Dance Centre. In 1980 she teamed up with Patti Webb and together appeared as street performers in London's Covent Garden pitches and at London night clubs. When she went to Paris in 1982 she studied the art of corporeal mime at Étienne Decroux's school in Boulogne-Billancourt. Back in London, in 1984, she met Mark Britton and they paired up to form the comedy duo "Nickelodeon". As of 2002, Krissie Illing lived in Vaour in southern France with her husband Chris Adams, himself a British juggling artist. They have two children.

== Career ==
=== Nickelodeon 1984–2000 ===
"Wilma" and "William" were created in 1984, two burlesque characters that under the name of "Nickelodeon". They were a success right from the start, both with audiences and critics, and won the Street Entertainer of the Year Award (London) in 1985 A recording of this event was broadcast on Channel 4. Their first full-length show "Did you see that?" earned them the Critics' Choice Award at the Edinburgh Festival in 1986. From there they went to New York, Montreal, Vancouver, Hong Kong, Tokyo, Nagasaki, Barcelona and Dublin, among other places, and were invited to festivals. In 1990 a German Channel, Westdeutscher Rundfunk asked "Nickelodeon" for a comedy to be produced on German TV. They presented "Dinner for Two", directed by René Bazinet, and become one of the most popular comedian ensembles in Germany. "Wilma" and "William" were acclaimed by large audiences and the press. They acted on cabaret stages in Germany, such as Fliegende Bauten Hamburg, Tipi Berlin, Senftöpfchen Cologne, and Comödie Dresden. "Dinner for Two" was followed by "Great Lovers in History", with both shows being televised, and running in the theatres. They produced "Sally and Sam", again for the Westdeutscher Rundfunk, an educational series for German primary school pupils to learn English.

=== Solo career ===
At the beginning of 2000, the two members of "Nickelodeon" pursued their solo careers.

Krissie Illing's first full-length one-person show "Wilma's Wonderful Laundrette" premiered in Vaour at the La Commanderie Theatre. Illing then performed on various stages in France and was invited to several festivals, e.g. the Femin'arte in Antibes, the festival des arts burlesques in Saint Étienne, the festival Porte-bonheur in Yverdon-les-Bains and the Arosa festival, both in Switzerland. In 2010 she appeared at the Festival d'humour et de café théâtre in Rocquencourt, France, and received the public's award. She was also awarded a prize in Berlin, appears in a TV movie with Dieter Hallervorden, and on TV shows in Germany, Switzerland, Belgium, and succeeded with her second solo show "Wilma's Jubilee". Her "Blind Date" is an example of how she uses nuances of facial expression and also of crossing the line between comedy and tragedy and to show the sadness in what seems to be hilarious, thus reflecting the Theatre of the Absurd. In Germany she met comedian Astrid Gloria. Together, they created a piece called "Comedy Ladies' Night" and performed in Germany under the name of "Wilde Weiber" ("Women Unchained") between 2002 and 2008. From 2009 Illing could be seen in Gerburg Jahnke's show Frau Jahnke hat eingeladen as an invited guests. Illing's career took her overseas again when between 2006 and 2008 she performs in the Teatro ZinZanni Spiegeltent for several months, both in Seattle and San Francisco. There performed a parody of the Queen Elizabeth II of Great Britain, an act that combined several dance styles, a half-striptease, and a complete split, revealing the constraints of protocol which turn a person into a puppet and stifle all vitality.

=== Nickelodeon 2005–present ===
In 2005 Krissie Illing and Mark Britton were re-united as Nickelodeon. The duo presented a new version of "Great Lovers in History" but also a Christmas show: "Christmas Dinner for Two". Since 2012 they have been touring with "Costa del Love": Wilma and William on their second honeymoon in Spain, trying to re-ignite the original spark of desire while at the same time fighting the trivial adversities of multilingual GPS, mosquitoes and slipped discs.

== Awards ==
=== For Nickelodeon ===
- 1985 Time Out Entertainer's Festival, Covent Garden Street Entertainer of the Year
- 1986 Edinburgh Festival: Critics' Choice

=== Solo ===
- 2003 Das große Kleinkunstfestival, Berlin
- 2010 Festival d'humour et de café théâtre in Rocquencourt, Public's Award

== See also ==
- List of dancers
