= Doca =

Doca may refer to:

- Doca (player), full name Alfredo "Doca" de Almeida Rego (1903-1988), Brazilian national football (soccer) layer
- Doca (singer), part of the duo Cidinho and Doca
- DOCa, abbreviation for Denominación de Origen
- DOCA, abbreviation for 11-deoxycorticosterone acetate
- Tia Doca (1932–2009), Brazilian samba dancer

== See also ==
- Zé Doca, municipality in the state of Maranhão in the Northeast region of Brazil
