= List of dancers =

== A ==
- Paula Abdul (born 19 June 1962), American singer, dancer, choreographer, actress, and television personality
- César Abreu, Puerto Rican and American dancer, former member of Menudo, dancer at Lincoln Center's Metropolitan Opera House, filmmaker
- Fred Astaire (10 May 1899 – 22 June 1987), American film and Broadway stage dancer, choreographer, singer, musician and actor; an innovator in dance; made 31 musical films, 10 featuring his dances with Ginger Rogers; named the fifth Greatest Male Star of All Time by the American Film Institute
- Alvin Ailey (January 5, 1931 – December 1, 1989), American dancer, director, choreographer, and activist; founded the Alvin Ailey American Dance Theater and its affiliated Alvin Ailey American Dance Center (later Ailey School) as havens for nurturing Black artists and expressing the universality of the African-American experience through dance
- Ann-Margret (1941), American actress, singer, and dancer
- Mary Anthony, American modern dancer, choreographer, dance teacher
- Allu Arjun, Indian actor who works in Telugu cinema; one of the highest paid actors in India; also known for his dancing skill
- Alisha Singh, Indian television actress, dancer and choreographer
- Hortensia Arnaud, pioneering Argentine dancer, vedette, and actress of film and stage
- Daniela Avanzini, American singer and dancer
- Ayo & Teo, duo of dancers and musicians from Ann Arbor, Michigan, United States

== B ==
- George Balanchine (22 January 1904 – 30 April 1983), Georgian ballet choreographer. He is one of the 20th century's foremost choreographers and one of the founders of American ballet. His work formed a bridge between classical and modern ballet.
- Sara Baras (born 1971), female Flamenco dancer, born in the port of Cadiz
- Mikhail Baryshnikov (born 28 January 1948), Soviet-born Russian American dancer, choreographer, and actor
- Rodney Bell (born 1971), known for physically integrated dance
- Beyoncé (born 4 September 1981), American singer, songwriter, dancer, and actress
- Bez (born 18 April 1964), renowned as the dancer for the Happy Mondays
- Vytautas Beliajus (26 February 1908 – September 1994), considered the father of international folk dancing in the United States
- Neil Bhatt, dancer, choreographer and actor from India, known for his work in Indian television. Who is also a Gujarat State Award Winner for choreography in his debut film Bhanwar.
- Carlo Blasis (4 November 1797 – 15 January 1878), Italian dancer, choreographer and dance theoretician
- Chrystelle Trump Bond (1 January 1938 – 6 May 2020), American dancer, choreographer, and dance historian
- AC Bonifacio (born 2002), Filipino-Canadian actress, singer, model and dancer
- Anise Boyer (1914–2008), American dancer who was part of the Cotton Club chorus line during the Harlem Renaissance and travelled with Cab Calloway's band
- James "Buster" Brown (1913–2000), internationally renowned American tap dancer
- Rachel Brice (born 15 June 1972), American professional belly dancer in Fusion style belly dance based in Portland, Oregon
- Chris Brown (5 May 1989), American singer, songwriter, rapper, dancer, and actor
- James Brown (3 May 1933 – 25 December 2006), commonly referred to as "The Godfather of Soul", "Mr. Dynamite", the "King of Funk", "Soul Brother #1" and "The Hardest Working Man in Show Business", was an American entertainer (singer and dancer). He is recognized as one of the most influential figures in 20th-century popular music and was renowned for his vocals and feverish dancing.
- Jean Butler (born 14 March 1971), Irish step dancer
- Glenn Ball (born 27 June 1985), English world champion line dancer and West Coast swing dancer, renowned choreographer
- Beaupré, French ballet dancer

== C ==
- Jaime Callica, Canadian former dancer and actor
- Raymond and Joyce Callis, English ballroom dancing champions
- Chiranjeevi, Indian actor and producer who works in Telugu cinema; one of the most successful and influential actors in the history of Indian cinemal known for his break dancing skills.
- Don Campbell (1951 – March 30, 2020), American dancer
- Leslie Caron, French dancer and motion picture actress
- Enrico Cecchetti (21 June 1850, Rome – 13 November 1928, Milan), Italian ballet dancer, founder of the Cecchetti method.
- Vernon and Irene Castle, husband-and-wife team of ballroom dancers of the early 20th century
- Helena Cholewicka (1848–1883), Polish ballet dancer and only titular "prima ballerina assoluta" in Warsaw Government Theatres
- Paul Christiano (1976–2015), American dancer and choreographer. Started out as a gymnast, then moved into dance. He was Chicago Magazine "Dancer of the year" 2003 and one of Time Out's "Dancing Men of 2010"
- Ciara, American singer-songwriter, dancer, and choreographer; known for her hip-hop style and contemporary dance choreography
- Bessie Clayton (c. 1875–1948), considered the "mother of American toe-tap dancing"
- Jack Cole (1911–1974), American dancer, choreographer, and theatre director known as the father of theatrical jazz dance
- Dean Collins (May 29, 1917 – June 1, 1984), American dancer, instructor, choreographer, and innovator of swing; often credited with bringing swing dance, or the Lindy hop, from New York to Southern California
- Misty Copeland (born September 10, 1982), American ballet dancer for American Ballet Theatre (ABT), one of the three leading classical ballet companies in the United States. On June 30, 2015, Copeland became the first African American woman to be promoted to principal dancer in ABT's 75-year history.
- Jean Coralli (1779–1854), French dancer and choreographer and later held the esteemed post of First Balletmaster of the Paris Opera Ballet. He is best known for the creation of the Romantic ballet Giselle which he choreographed in tandem with another French dancer, Jules Perrot.
- Joaquín Cortés (born February 22, 1969), classically trained ballet and flamenco dancer from Spain of Roma origin
- Merce Cunningham (16 April 1919 – 26 July 2009), American dancer and choreographer
- Sophie Chevigny, French ballet dancer

== D ==
- Tabitha and Napoleon D'umo, also known as Nappytabs, choreographers and creative directors who are credited with developing the new style of hip-hop dance known as lyrical hip-hop
- Carmen de Lavallade (March 6, 1931 – December 29, 2025), American actress, choreographer, and dancer. For many years, she was associated with and married to Tony Award–winning actor, dancer, and director Geoffrey Holder.
- Alex Da Silva (born 27 March 1968), Brazilian dancer and choreographer, specializing in Salsa dancing. Da Silva is also known for being a recurring guest choreographer on the Fox TV show So You Think You Can Dance.
- Astad Deboo (1947–2020), Indian dancer-choreographer, who has mixed a modern and contemporary dance styles, with Indian classical dance forms of Kathak and Kathakali in which he has trained, to create style unique to him.
- Nicole de Weever (born 1979), Sint Maarten dancer and choreographer
- Sergei Pavlovich Diaghilev (March 31, 1872 – August 19, 1929), Russian art critic, patron, ballet impresario and founder of the Ballets Russes from which many famous dancers and choreographers would later arise
- Charles-Louis Didelot (27 March 1767 – 7 November 1837), French dancer and choreographer
- Lucinda Dickey (born August 14, 1960), American dancer and actress best known for her role as Kelly in the 1984 cult film Breakin' and the 1984 sequel, Breakin' 2: Electric Boogaloo
- Devi Dja (1914–1989), Indonesian-born American dancer, choreographer, actress, and singer
- Tia Doca (1932–2009), Brazilian samba dancer and singer
- Doctor Ice, influenced hip-hop dancing to a new form; his influence can be noted by the dance moves in videos done by artists such as Kid N Play, Scrap Lover and Scoop Lover (dancers for Big Daddy Kane) and G-Wiz and the late Trouble T-Roy (from Heavy D & The Boyz)
- Shabba Doo (1955–2020), American actor, dancer, choreographer, and director; a founder of hip hop, dancing as a member oftThe Original Lockers; a pioneer of "locking"
- Isadora Duncan (May 27, 1877 – September 14, 1927), American dancer; considered by many to be the mother of modern dance; although never very popular in the United States, she entertained throughout Europe
- Katherine Mary Dunham (June 22, 1909 – May 21, 2006), American dancer, choreographer, songwriter, author, educator and activist who was trained as an anthropologist. Dunham had one of the most successful dance careers in American and European theater of the 20th century and has been called the Matriarch and Queen Mother of Black Dance.
- Dharmesh Yelande, Indian dancer, choreographer and reality show judge
- Darshan, Indian actor, dancer, and distributor

== E ==
- Amera Eid, Australian belly dancer and owner of an Australian belly dance school, Amera's Palace. Eid opened Amera's Palace belly dance boutique in 1987, which included one of the first belly dance schools in Sydney.
- Fanny Elssler (23 June 1810 – 27 November 1884), Austrian dancer
- Makhmud Esambayev (15 July 1924 – 7 January 2000), Soviet Chechen actor and dancer
- Norberto Esbrez (1966–2014), Argentinian tango dancer, choreographer, and teacher of tango nuevo. He is known as El Pulpo or octopus for his fluid and intricate leg moves.

== F ==
- Eugene Louis Faccuito (March 20, 1925 – April 7, 2015), American jazz dancer, choreographer, teacher and innovator who is best known for creating a jazz exercise technique.
- Lusi Faiva, known for physically integrated dance (New Zealand)
- Nora Fatehi, Canadian dancer, singer, and actress, she is a belly dancer and Hip-hop dancer.
- Antonio Fini (born March 26, 1983), Italian dancer, choreographer, educator and producer
- Michael Ryan Flatley (born July 16, 1958), Irish step dancer from the south side of the country
- Flying Steps, German breakdance crew, founded in 1993.
- Cristina Wistari Formaggia (August 27, 1945 – July 19, 2008), key participant in the preservation and dissemination of Balinese dance
- Bob Fosse (June 23, 1927 – September 23, 1987), dancer, actor, film director, film editor, screenwriter, and most notably a groundbreaking jazz/musical theatre choreographer. He won eight tony awards for choreography. His unique and famous style has been imitated and recreated over and over again throughout the world.
- Michel Fokine (April 23, 1880 – August 22, 1942), groundbreaking Russian choreographer and dancer. Fokine staged more than 70 ballets in Europe and the United States.
- Evan-Burrows Fontaine, American interpretive dancer and Ziegfeld Follies performer
- Dame Margot Fonteyn (18 May 1919 – 21 February 1991), widely regarded as England's greatest ballerina, stage partner and friend of Rudolf Nureyev for many years.
- William Forsythe (born December 30, 1949), American dancer and choreographer resident in Dresden in Saxony. He is known internationally for his work with the Frankfurt Ballet and his reorientation of classical ballet.
- Joe Frisco (November 4, 1889 – February 12, 1958), American vaudeville performer who first made his name on stage as a jazz dancer, but later incorporated his stuttering voice to his act and became a popular comedian. Frisco was a mainstay on the vaudeville circuit in the 1920s and 1930s. He made his Broadway debut in the Florenz Ziegfeld Follies in 1918.
- Chicho Frumboli, one of the most famous Argentine Tango dancers. He is best known for his improvisation skills, and is regarded as one of the founders of Tango nuevo. He usually dances in this open style but is at ease when dancing close. He performed among others with Gotan Project, Tanghetto and Narcotango.
- Loie Fuller (January 15, 1862 – January 1, 1928), pioneer of both modern dance and theatrical lighting techniques.
- Marcelo Ferreira, one of the most talented Brazilian Dancers, now he is a Coryphee with the Leipziger Ballett, Germany. Finished his training at the School of the Hamburg Ballet, under direction of Kevin Heigen and Gigi Hyatt, worked with the Bundesjugendballett where he was nominated "Talent to watch" by Dance Magazine in 2017.

== G ==
- Antonio Gades (November 14, 1936 – July 20, 2004), Spanish flamenco dancer and choreographer. He helped to popularize the art form on the international stage.
- Samia Gamal (1924 – December 1, 1994), Egyptian belly dancer and film actress. In 1949, Egypt's King Farouk proclaimed Samia Gamal "The National Dancer of Egypt", which brought US attention to the dancer.
- Pavel Andreyevich Gerdt, also known as Paul Gerdt (near St. Peterburg, Russia, 22 November 1844 – Vamaloki, Finland, 12 August 1917), was the Premier Danseur Noble of the Imperial Ballet, the Bolshoi Kamenny Theatre, and the Mariinsky Theatre for 56 years, making his debut in 1860, and retiring in 1916.
- Gus Giordano (1923 – March 9, 2008), American jazz dancer
- Savion Glover (born November 19, 1973), American actor, tap dancer, and choreographer
- Martha Graham (May 11, 1894 – April 1, 1991), American dancer and choreographer regarded as one of the foremost pioneers of modern dance, and is widely considered one of the greatest artists of the 20th century.

== H ==
- MC Hammer (Stanley Kirk Burrell born March 30, 1962), American emcee and hip-hop dancer, most popular during the late 1980s to mid-1990s
- Erick Hawkins (April 23, 1909 – November 23, 1994), American dancer and choreographer
- Sir Robert Helpmann (9 April 1909 – 28 September 1986), Australian dancer, actor, theatre director, and choreographer. Co-director of the Australian Ballet during the 1960s and 1970s.
- Tatsumi Hijikata (March 9, 1928 – January 21, 1986), Japanese choreographer, and the founder of a genre of dance performance art called Butoh.
- Thelma Hill (1924 – 1977), African-American ballet dancer, choreographer and dance teacher, performed in the first telecast of Revelations
- Gregory Oliver Hines (February 14, 1946 – August 9, 2003), American actor, singer, dancer and choreographer
- Hong 10 (born 16 February 1985 in South Korea), male South Korean B-Boy
- Geoffrey Lamont Holder (August 1, 1930 - October 5, 2014), was a Trinidadian-American actor, dancer, musician, director, choreographer, and artist. He was a principal dancer for the Metropolitan Opera Ballet. Holder married dancer Carmen de Lavallade (1931–2025) in 1955.
- Lester Horton (January 23, 1906 – November 2, 1953), American dancer, choreographer, and teacher
- Dore Hoyer (12 December 1911 – 31 December 1967), German expressionist dancer and choreographer credited as "one of the most important solo dancers of the Ausdruckstanz tradition."
- Finola Hughes (born 29 October 1959), English dancer and actress, most noted for her appearance in the 1983 film Staying Alive
- Doris Batcheller Humphrey (October 17, 1895 – December 29, 1958), dancer of the early 20th century

== I ==
- Krissie Illing (born 8 December 1956), English dancer, mime, clown, comedian, and ventriloquist

== J ==
- Janet Jackson (born May 16, 1966), American singer and entertainer
- Michael Jackson (August 29, 1958 – June 25, 2009), American musician and entertainer, often cited by various media outlets as the "World's Best Dancer"
- Judith Jamison (May 10, 1943 – November 9, 2024), American dancer and choreographer; danced with the Alvin Ailey American Dance Theater 1965–1980 and was Ailey's muse; the company's artistic director 1989–2011, and then its artistic director emerita
- Robert Joffrey (1930–1988), American dancer, teacher, producer, and choreographer, known for his highly imaginative modern ballets
- Thomas Johnson (better known as Tommy the Clown), American dancer, best known as the inventor of the "clowning" style of dance, which evolved into the popular "krumping" style. Johnson invented the style in 1992, to enhance birthday party clown acts, thereby creating the concept of "hip-hop clowns". Johnson and his followers have performed at birthday parties ranging from inner city communities to celebrities like
- Tamsier Joof (born May 17, 1973), British dancer and choreographer Senegalese and Gambian descent trained in classical ballet, jazz, tap, contemporary, African and voguing; one of the early London voguers
- Master Juba (c. 1825 – c. 1852 or 1853), African-American dancer active in the 1840s, highly influential in the development of such American dance styles as tap, jazz, and step dancing

== K ==
- Kunwar Amarjeet Singh (born 16 March 1984), modern dancer and choreographer from India; known for his hip-hop dancing styles, mainly the old-school genre, and for his Bollywood style, especially partner dancing or group dancing
- Malika Kalontarova (born September 5, 1950), Tajik Bukharian Jewish dancer; earned the titles of People's Artist of USSR, People's Artist of Tajikistan and Honored Artist of Tajikistan (the highest titles given in her native nation)
- Geeta Kapoor, Indian dancer, choreographer and reality show judge
- Tamara Platonovna Karsavina (March 10, 1885 – May 26, 1978), famous Russian ballerina who eventually settled in England, where she helped create the Royal Academy of Dance in 1920
- Gene Kelly (August 23, 1912 – February 2, 1996), Emmy Award-winning American dancer, actor, singer, director, producer and choreographer
- Lilliana Ketchman (born June 23, 2008), American dancer, model and YouTuber, most known for her role on the reality show, Dance Moms
- Manlee Kongprapad (1884–1971), Thai dancer
- Jiří Kylián (born 1947), Czech dance choreographer. Kylián studied in Prague, as well as at the Royal Ballet School in London. He joined the Stuttgart Ballet in 1968 and worked under John Cranko, where he began to choreograph. Kylián became artistic director of Nederlands Dans Theatre in 1976.
- Maria Kochetkova (born 1984 in Moscow), principal dancer with the San Francisco Ballet. Kochetkova studied at the Bolshoi School in Moscow, and danced with the Royal Ballet and English National Ballet School.
- Kamo Mphela (born November 29, 1999), South African dancer and singer
- Kriti Jain (born September 22,2011) , Indian Dancer

== L ==
- Rudolf Laban (December 15, 1879 – July 1, 1958), notable, central European dance artist and theorist, whose work laid the foundations for Laban Movement Analysis, and other more specific developments.
- Eddie Ladd, award-winning Welsh contemporary dancer, known for her controversial themes and presentation style.
- Walter Laird (26 July 1920 – 30 May 2002), Dancesport World Champion in Professional Latin. He is the author of the Technique of Latin American Dancing, and coached many dancer champions including Allan Tornsberg, Vibeke Toft, Espen Salberg, Jukka Haapalainen and Sirpa Suutari.
- Last For One, break dancing crew that formed in 1997. With their win in the 2005 Battle of the Year, they have been recognized as a worldwide known name and a contributor to the Korean wave, their fans respectively calling them the Dancing Taeguk Warriors.
- Nick Lazzarini (born 1984), first season winner of the Fox reality show So You Think You Can Dance
- Nikolai Legat (1869–1937), dancer with the Russian Imperial Ballet 1888–1914; main successor to the roles of the great ballet dancer Pavel Gerdt
- Lawrence Leritz (born September 26, 1962), American dancer and choreographer
- Les Twins, French dance duo composed of identical twin brothers Larry and Laurent Bourgeois (born December 6, 1988)
- Terence Lewis, Indian dancer, choreographer and reality show judge
- Sonia Destri Lie (Brazil), Brazilian dancer and choreographer; formed hip hop group Companhia Urbana de Dança in 2005, which has achieved increasing international recognition
- Māris Liepa (27 July 1936, Riga – 26 March 1989, Moscow), Latvian ballet dancer
- Lil' C (born Christopher A. Toler in January 1983), American dancer and choreographer; has choreographed for So You Think You Can Dance, along with many top music icons
- José Limón (1908–1972), pioneering modern dancer and choreographer. He was born in Culiacán Mexico and the eldest of 12 children. He moved to New York City in 1928 where he studied under Doris Humphrey and Charles Weidman. In 1946, Limón founded the José Limón Dance Company. His most famous dance is The Moor's Pavane (1949), based on Shakespeare's Othello
- Chloe Lukasiak (born May 25, 2001), American actress, dancer, author, model and reality TV star known for starring on the reality show Dance Moms
- Jennifer Lopez (born July 24, 1969), American actress, singer and dancer known for her upbeat pop songs and Latin-pop influenced dancing abilities
- La Argentina (September 4, 1890 – July 18, 1936), Argentine-born Spanish dancer

== M ==
- Madonna (born August 16, 1958), American recording artist, actress and dancer. Her controversially successful career has made her one of the best selling artists of all time and one of the world's most influential dancers.
- Madhuri Dixit, Indian actress, producer, television personality, trained classical dancers and one of the leading actresses in Bollywood.
- Natalia Makarova (born November 21, 1940), Soviet-Russian prima ballerina. The History of Dance, published in 1981, notes that "Her performances set standards of artistry and aristocracy of dance which mark her as the finest ballerina of her generation." She has also won awards as an actress and continues to stage classical ballets throughout the world.
- Frankie Manning (1914–2009), American dancer, instructor and choreographer. Manning is considered to be one of the founding fathers of the Lindy hop
- Mario (born August 27, 1986), R&B singer-songwriter, record producer, actor, and dancer; runner-up on The Masked Singer season 12.
- István Martin, Franco-Hungarian ballet dancer
- Mata Hari, stage name of Margaretha Geertruida Zelle (7 August 1876 – 15 October 1917), Dutch exotic dancer and courtesan who was executed by firing squad for espionage during World War I. Many books have been written about Mata Hari, some of them serious historical and biographical accounts, and many of them highly speculative.
- Mario Maya, recognized as one of the greatest flamenco dancers and choreographers of all times. He is the father of Belen Maya, one of the main figures of contemporary flamenco dance.
- Adriana Miller ("The Legendary Adriana"), American who helped in the renaissance of Middle Eastern dance in Washington, D.C.
- Ann Miller (April 12, 1923 – January 22, 2004), American dancer, singer and actress
- Norma Miller (December 2, 1919 – May 5, 2019), American swing dancer known as the Queen of Swing
- Jewel McGowan, dancer of Lindy Hop, a form of swing dance, in the 1940s and 1950s. She is known among dance aficionados as the frequent partner of dancer Dean Collins. Jewel was considered by her fellow Los Angeles dancers to be the best female swing dancer who ever lived.
- Mukti Mohan, Indian dancer and actress; winner of Zara Nachke Dikha 2
- Baisali Mohanty, Indian classical dancer and choreographer of Indian dancing style Odissi. Widely regarded as one of the most promising dancer of her generation, Baisali has been performing along with her own dance company "Baisali Mohanty & Troupe" for over a decade in major international and national festivals.
- Alex Moore (1901–1991), pioneer of modern ballroom dancing, a dancer, dance teacher and author of classical ballroom dancing books. His Ballroom Dancing is considered to be the "Bible" of international-style ballroom dancing.
- Mary Murphy (born March 9, 1958), ballroom dance champion, accredited dance judge, and a regular judge and choreographer on the FOX dance competition-reality show So You Think You Can Dance. Mary Murphy is a former U.S. champion ballroom dancer and TV personality. She was born in Lancaster, Ohio, the only daughter in an Irish family of four children. She graduated from Northwest High School in Canal Fulton, Ohio.

== N ==
- N. T. Rama Rao Jr. (born 20 May 1983), Indian actor and producer who works in Telugu cinema. One of the highest paid actors in India. He is also a highly accomplished and trained Kuchipudi dancer. He attained popularity all over the world for the Academy award winning original song "Naatu Naatu" from the 2022 film RRR.
- Aira Naginevičiūtė, international dance artist, producer and composer.
- Nellie Navette (1865–1936), British dancer, singer and comedienne of the late 19th and early 20th-centuries who performed in music hall, variety and pantomime.
- The Nicholas Brothers, African-American team of dancing brothers, Fayard Nicholas (1914–2006) and Harold Nicholas (1921–2000). With their highly acrobatic technique, high level of artistry and daring innovations, they were considered by many the greatest tap dancers of their day.
- Bronislava Nijinska (1891–1972), Polish and Russian ballet dancer
- Vaslav Fomich Nijinsky (March 12, 1889 – April 8, 1950), Polish ballet dancer and choreographer. Nijinsky was one of the most gifted male dancers in history, and he became celebrated for his virtuosity and for the depth and intensity of his characterizations. He could perform en pointe, a rare skill among male dancers at the time (Albright, 2004) and his ability to perform seemingly gravity-defying leaps was also legendary.
- Rudolf Nureyev (March 17, 1938 – January 6, 1993), regarded as one of the greatest male ballet dancers of the 20th century, alongside Maris Liepa, Vaslav Nijinsky, Alexander Godunov and Mikhail Baryshnikov
- Ne-Yo (October 18, 1979), Grammy-Award winning singer, songwriter, actor, record producer, and dancer; winner of The Masked Singer season 10

== O ==
- Donald O'Connor (August 28, 1925 – September 27, 2003), American tap dancer. He appeared alongside Peggy Ryan in several Universal Studios musicals throughout the 1940s. Several years later, he appeared with Gene Kelly and Debbie Reynolds in the 1952 film classic Singin' in the Rain.
- Ann-Margret Olsson, Swedish-American, famous for dancing, acting and singing in many American motion pictures, including Viva Las Vegas
- Simona Orinska (born August 18, 1978), the only butoh artist in Latvia; multidisciplinary artist: contemporary dancer, poet, director and choreographer of many art projects; dance movement therapy practitioner

== P ==
- Anna Pavlovna Pavlova (12 February 1881 – 23 January 1931), famous Russian ballerina of the late 19th and the early 20th century. Pavlova is a largely remembered for her famous dance The Dying Swan and because she was the first ballerina to travel around the world and bring ballet to people who had never seen it.
- Annetta Pelucchi (20th-century), dancer with the Chicago Opera Company
- Pepita de Oliva (1830–1871), Romani Spanish dancer who performed across Europe
- Jules-Joseph Perrot (August 18, 1810 – August 18, 1892), French dancer and choreographer who later became Balletmaster of the Imperial Ballet in St. Petersburg, Russia.
- Marius Petipa (1819–1910), French-Russian ballet dancer and choreographer
- Arlene Phillips OBE, English choreographer and former dancer. Has staged numerous musicals in the West End and Broadway; winning or being nominated for a number of prestigious awards including the Laurence Olivier Award and the Tony Award. Is most noted as a television dance expert, judging shows such as Strictly Come Dancing and So You Think You Can Dance.
- Ommi Pipit-Suksun, Thai ballerina, former soloist with the San Francisco Ballet and former principal dancer with Ballet San Jose.
- Juanita Pitts, African-American tap dancer who performed in the 1930s to the 1950s
- Maya Plisetskaya (1925–2015), Russian ballet dancer, choreographer, ballet director, and actress, who is considered one of the greatest ballerinas of the 20th century. Since 1960 she was the prima ballerina assoluta of the Bolshoi Theatre.
- Eleanor Torrey Powell (November 21, 1912 – February 11, 1982), American dancer and actress; best remembered for her tap dance numbers in musical films in the 1930s and 1940s.
- Prince (June 7, 1958 – April 21, 2016), American singer-songwriter, multi-instrumentalist, dancer, and record producer. He was a musical innovator who was known for his eclectic work, flamboyant stage presence, extravagant dress and makeup, and wide vocal range. His music integrates a wide variety of styles, including funk, rock, R&B, new wave, soul, psychedelia, and pop.
- Juliet Prowse (1941–1996), South African-American dancer who was famous for dancing, acting, and singing in many American motion pictures, including G.I. Blues along with Elvis Presley.
- Prabu Deva, Indian dancer, actor, director and choreographer
- Punit J Pathak, Indian dancer, choreographer and reality show judge
- Puneeth Rajkumar, Indian dancer, film producer and philanthropist

== R ==
- Dame Marie Rambert (20 February 1888 – 12 June 1982), Polish-Jewish dancer and dance pedagogue who exerted a great influence on British ballet, both as a dancer and teacher.
- Wade Robson (born September 17, 1982), Australian dancer, choreographer, producer and songwriter.
- Pierre Rameau (1674–1748), French dancing master to Elisabetta Farnese, and the author of two books that now provide us with valuable information about Baroque dance.
- Konidela Ram Charan (born 27 March 1985), Indian actor, film producer, and entrepreneur who primarily works in Telugu cinema. He is one of the highest-paid actors in Indian cinema and is also known for his dancing.
- Ram Pothineni, Indian actor who works in Telugu cinema. He is known for his quick versatile dance moves.
- Bill Robinson (May 25, 1878 – November 25, 1949), also known as Bojangles, pioneer and pre-eminent African-American tap dance performer.
- Ginger Rogers (July 16, 1911 – April 25, 1995), American dancer, actress, and singer during the Golden Age of Hollywood, known for dancing in 10 feature films with Fred Astaire.
- Brynn Rumfallo (July 1, 2003), American dancer, model and actress who rose to fame on America's Got Talent and Dance Moms.
- Peggy Ryan (August 29, 1924 – October 30, 2004), American dancer and starred in several Universal Studios musicals in the 1940s with Donald O'Connor, such as Mister Big, What's Cookin'?, and Patrick the Great, their last film together.
- Hrithik Roshan (born 10 January 1974), Indian actor who appears in Bollywood films. He has portrayed a variety of characters and is known for his dancing skills
- Remo D'Souza, Indian choreographer, dancer, director and reality show judge
- Raghav Juyal (born 10 July 1991), Indian dancer, choreographer, actor, television presenter
- Rakul Preet Singh, Indian actress, dancer.

== S ==
- Adam G. Sevani (born June 29, 1992), actor as well as a dancer. Known as Moose from Step Up 2: The Streets and its sequel, Step Up 3D. Adam and director of Step Up 2, Jon Chu, and their dance group ACDC or Adam/Chu Dance Crew, had challenged pop star Miley Cyrus to a highly publicized dance battle.
- Ruth St. Denis (January 20, 1879 – July 21, 1968), early modern dance pioneer
- Benjiman "Benji" Daniel Schwimmer (born January 18, 1984), American professional swing dancer. On August 16, 2006, he was crowned "America's Favorite Dancer", as the winner of the second season of So You Think You Can Dance
- Nadine Senior (1939–2016), founder of Phoenix Dance Theatre and the Northern School of Contemporary Dance
- Uday Shankar (December 8, 1900 – September 26, 1977), pioneer of modern dance in India, and a world renowned Indian dancer and choreographer
- Lloyd Shaw (1890–1958), also known as Dr. Lloyd "Pappy" Shaw, was an educator, and is generally credited with bringing about the broad revival of square dancing in America.
- Ted Shawn (October 21, 1891 – January 9, 1972), pioneer of American modern dance. who created the Denishawn School together with his wife Ruth St. Denis.
- Ranjabati Sircar (29 March 1963 – 23 October 1999), Indian dancer and choreographer noted for her contributions to experimental and contemporary Indian dance forms (Nava Nritya).
- Jimmy Slyde (1927–2008), known as the King of Slides, world-renowned tap dancer, especially famous for his innovative tap style mixed with jazz. Slyde's profile in the United States revived noticeably in the 1980s.
- "Shorty" George Snowden, African American dancer in Harlem during the 1920s and 1930s. He is popularly credited with coining the name "Lindy Hop" for a popular partner swing dance of the day.
- Britney Spears (born December 2, 1981), American singer and dancer. Apart from being famous for her hit singles "...Baby One More Time" and "Oops!...I Did It Again", she is known internationally for her unique outfits and her entertaining and freestyle dancing.
- John William Sublett (February 19, 1902 – May 18, 1986), known by his stage name John W. Bubbles, was an American vaudeville performer, singer and entertainer. Sublett is known as the father of "rhythm tap", a form of tap dance.
- Sylvia Sykes, swing dance instructor, judge and choreographer. In particular, she is considered by most to be the leading authority on the dance Balboa.
- Sanjay Khatri (born 1987), India's first male ballet dancer and ballet teacher
- Shantanu Maheshwari (born March 7, 1991), Indian actor, dancer, and choreographer
- Shakti Mohan, contemporary dancer, choreographer and reality show judge from India. She is winner of dance India dance season 2.
- Shahid Kapoor, actor and dancer from India
- Super Junior, Korean multi-talented boy band under the company SM Entertainment. They performed Twins for their debut in 2005.
- Sema Yildiz, Turkish belly dancer, Romani dancer, dance teacher and actress who is known as the first dancer to perform in the Ottoman era Topkapi palace. She has been referred to as "One of Turkey's senior oriental dancers" and is also known for her expertise in Romani dance.

== T ==
- Marie Taglioni (April 23, 1804 – April 24, 1884), famous Italian ballerina of the Romantic ballet era, a central figure in the history of European dance
- Layla Taj, Egyptian belly dancer whose dances communicate aspects of Egyptian traditions and culture
- Maria Tallchief (1925–2013), America's first major prima ballerina, widely considered to have revolutionized American ballet
- Teyana Taylor (born 10 December 1990), American singer, songwriter, actress, model, dancer, choreographer, and music video director.
- Twyla Tharp (born July 1, 1941), leading American dancer and choreographer. She has won Emmy and Tony awards, and currently works as a choreographer in New York City.
- Lisa Joann Thompson (born April 22, 1969), American dancer and choreographer, best known for starring as a Fly Girl on the In Living Color television show.
- Danny Tidwell (born August 1, 1984), American contemporary and ballet dancer and choreographer, best known for being the runner-up on Fox's third season of So You Think You Can Dance in 2007.
- Alphonse Tierou (born 17 April 1946), French dancer, choreographer, and scholar of dance
- Eddie Torres (born July 3, 1950), famed salsa dance instructor
- Joyce Trisler (1934–1979), American modem dancer and choreographer.
- Antony Tudor (4 April 1908 – 19 April 1987), born William Cook, influential 20th-century English ballet choreographer, teacher and dancer

== U ==
- Galina Ulanova (8 January 1910 [O.S. 26 December 1909] – 21 March 1998), Russian ballet dancer; frequently called one of the greatest ballerinas of the 20th century;prima ballerina assoluta of the Bolshoi Theater 1944–1960
- Usher (musician) (born 14 October 1978), American singer, songwriter, dancer, and actor.
- Doris Uhlich (born 1977), internationally active Austrian choreographer, performer and dance teacher.

== V ==
- Agrippina Yakovlevna Vaganova (July 6, 1879 – November 5, 1951), Russian ballet teacher who developed the Vaganova method, technique which derived from the teaching methods of the old Imperial Ballet School (today the Vaganova Academy of Russian Ballet)
- Marie van Goethem (born 1865), subject of Edgar Degas's Little Dancer of Fourteen Years statue, dancer with the Paris Opera Ballet
- Vera-Ellen (1921-1981), American dancer and film star

== W ==
- Karin Waehner (1926–1999), German-born French modern dancer and choreographer
- Elliana Walmsley (born June 23, 2007), American dancer, actress and model who is most known for starring on the reality show, Dance Moms
- John Weaver (July 21, 1673 – September 24, 1760), English dancer and choreographer and is commonly known as the father of English pantomime.
- Charles Weidman (1901 Lincoln, Nebraska – 1975), American modern dancer, choreographer and teacher
- Mary Ann Wells (1894–1971), American dance teacher
- Mary Wigman (1886–1973), German dancer, choreographer, and instructor of dance. Credited for innovation of expressionist dance, and pioneer of modern dance in Germany
- G. Hepburn Wilson (1875–?), proponent of jazz dancing
- Katja Wulff (1890–1992), German-Swiss expressionist dancer and dance instructor
- Leni Wylliams (1961–1996), African-American dancer/choreographer/master-teacher

== Y ==
- Sada Yacco (July 18, 1871 – December 7, 1946), Japanese geisha, actress, and dancer
- Lamun Yamakhup (1905–1982), Thai classical dancer
- Nellie Yu Roung Ling (1889–1973), Chinese dancer and choreographer, considered the first modern dancer of China

== Z ==
- Mackenzie Ziegler (born June 4, 2004), American dancer, singer, author, and actress who is most known for her role on the reality show, Dance Moms.
- Maddie Ziegler (born September 30, 2002), American dancer, actress and model who is most known for her role on the reality show, Dance Moms, as well as the main dancer in the music videos for Australian singer-songwriter Sia.
- Lahcen Zinoun (born 1944), Moroccan choreographer, dancer and filmmaker; considered the greatest contemporary Moroccan choreographer.

== See also ==
- Women in dance
  - List of female dancers
  - List of Indian women in dance
- List of African-American ballerinas
- List of Russian ballet dancers
- Prima ballerina assoluta
- List of prima ballerinas
- List of dance companies
- List of So You Think You Can Dance finalists
