= Marcus Hamilton =

Marcus Hamilton may refer to:

- Marcus Hamilton (Angel), a character from the TV series Angel
- Marcus Hamilton (American football) (born 1984), American football cornerback
