= Alex Moore (dancer) =

British dancer

Alexander Reuben Percy Moore MBE (1901–1991) was an English ballroom dancer. He was a pioneer of modern ballroom dancing, a leading adjudicator and organiser, a dance teacher of international renown and the author of classical ballroom dancing texts. His Ballroom Dancing is considered to be the 'Bible' of International-style ballroom dancing.

His dancing career started at the age of 7. In 1926 he was placed second in a World Championship of ballroom dancing, dancing with his sister. In 1932 he partnered Pat Kilpatrick, who would become his wife. In both his dancing and later his teaching he travelled all over the world.

He held the post of Chairman and later President of the ISTD, and was Honorary President of the International Council of Ballroom Dance. From 1932 Alex Moore issued the Alex Moore Monthly Letter Service, a periodical about ballroom dancing, with hints for dancers and instructors and news about dance championships. It was circulated in 40 countries in several languages. His 1936 Ballroom Technique book is the base of the ISTD reference for the category of International Standard. Addressing the need in quick reference, he devised the chart format of the description of ballroom dance figures, used today.

== Bibliography ==
- The Ballroom Technique
  - The Ballroom Technique (numerous reprints and editions since 1948) by ISTD was originally based on a work of the same name by Alex Moore.
- Ballroom Dancing, an elaboration on the above book (10th Edition, 2002, ISBN 0-87830-153-4; 9th Edition, 1986, ISBN 0-7136-2794-8; 1st Edition, 1972, ISBN 9780273405719)
- Popular Variations (numerous reprints and editions since 1954)

== See also ==
- List of dancers
- Victor Silvester
