= Aira Naginevičiūtė =

Lithuanian dance artist, producer and composer

Aira Naginevičiūtė is a Lithuania-born, international dance artist, producer and composer.

She established a contemporary dance company in 1989 called Fluidis. In 1998 she began teaching at the Lithuanian Academy of Music and Theatre. To date she has developed 20+ dance productions and compositions. Some of her most acclaimed works include: Processus, Pregnant Silence Ego and Id, and The Moon Does Not Care about Barking Dogs.

Naginevičiūtė's Processus was awarded the Lithuanian Ministry of Culture prize for best choreography in the year 2002.

== See also ==
- List of dancers
