= Justin Skule =

American football player (born 1996)

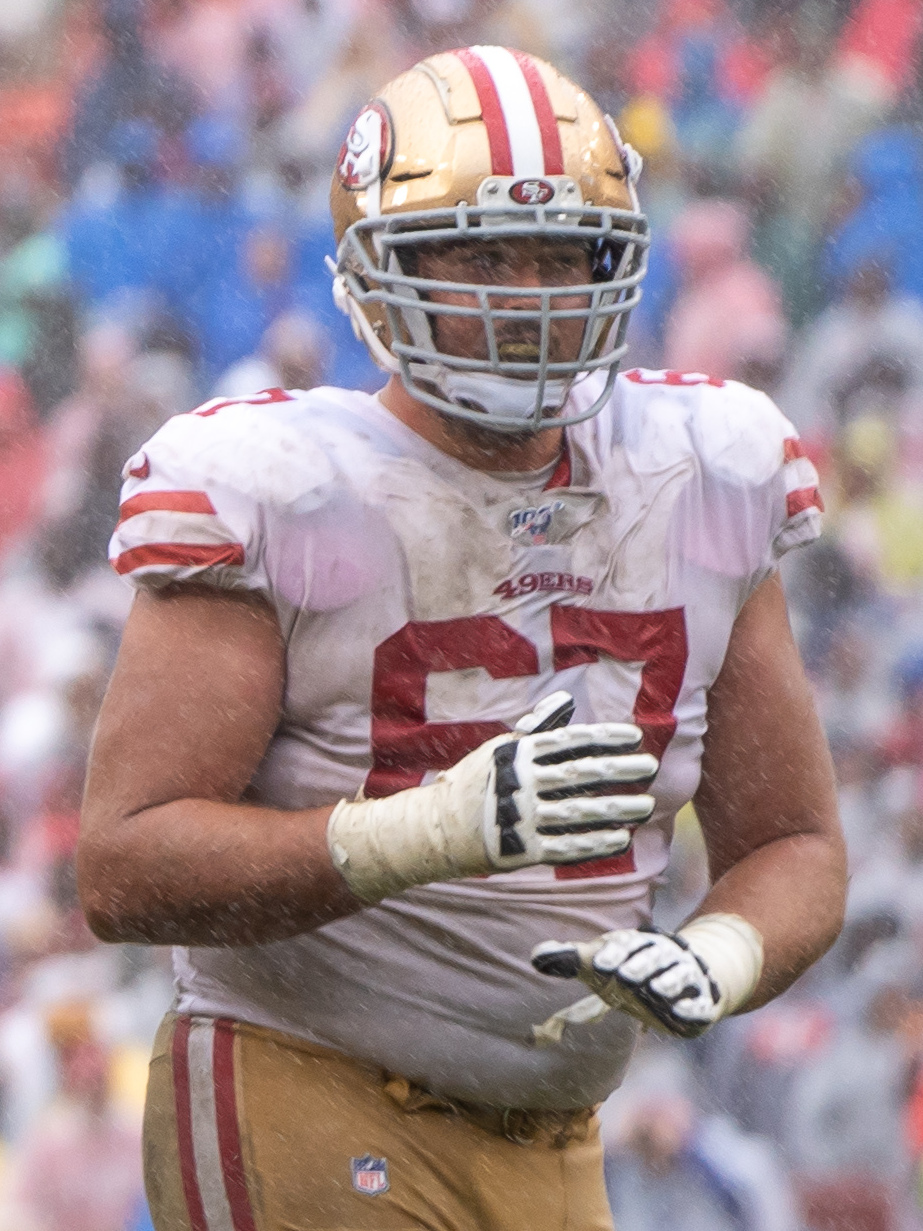
- Skule with the San Francisco 49ers in 2019

No. 77 – Tampa Bay Buccaneers
- Position: Offensive tackle
- Roster status: Active

Personal information
- Born: November 23, 1996 (age 29); Clifton, Virginia, U.S.
- Listed height: 6 ft 6 in (1.98 m)
- Listed weight: 315 lb (143 kg)

Career information
- High school: Centreville (Clifton)
- College: Vanderbilt (2015–2018)
- NFL draft: 2019: 6th round, 183rd overall pick

Career history
- San Francisco 49ers (2019–2021); Tampa Bay Buccaneers (2022–2024); Minnesota Vikings (2025); Tampa Bay Buccaneers (2026–present)

Career NFL statistics as of 2025
- Games played: 82
- Games started: 26
- Stats at Pro Football Reference

Justin Grant Skule (born November 23, 1996) is an American professional football offensive tackle for the Tampa Bay Buccaneers of the National Football League (NFL). He played college football for the Vanderbilt Commodores. He was selected by the San Francisco 49ers in the sixth round of the 2019 NFL draft.

== Early life ==
Skule was a two-year starting left tackle for Centreville High School. Skule played in two state championships winning one in 2013. As a three-star lineman, Skule committed to Vanderbilt. He also received offers from Navy, West Virginia, Rutgers, and Virginia.

== College career ==
Skule was nearly a four-year starter on the offensive line for Vanderbilt, missing only five games in his freshman season due to an injury. He was named to the Freshman Southeastern Conference (SEC) Academic Honor Roll his first year, and then the SEC Academic Honor Roll his second and third years.

== Professional career ==
Pre-draft measurables
Height	Weight	Arm length	Hand span	Wingspan	40-yard dash	10-yard split	20-yard split	20-yard shuttle	Three-cone drill	Vertical jump	Broad jump	Bench press
6 ft 6 5/8 in (2.00 m)	320 lb (145 kg)	33 7/8 in (0.86 m)	10 in (0.25 m)	6 ft 8 in (2.03 m)	5.26 s	1.83 s	3.07 s	4.73 s	7.54 s	25.5 in (0.65 m)	8 ft 9 in (2.67 m)	22 reps
All values from Pro Day

=== San Francisco 49ers ===
Skule was selected by the San Francisco 49ers in the sixth round (183rd overall) of the 2019 NFL draft. In 2019, the 49ers reached Super Bowl LIV, but they lost 31–20 to the Kansas City Chiefs. Skule played in all 16 games in 2020, starting 4 of them.

On June 7, 2021, Skule suffered a torn ACL during practice, ending his 2021 season. He was waived/injured on June 11, and reverted to the team's injured reserve list on June 14.

On August 30, 2022, Skule was released by the 49ers.

=== Tampa Bay Buccaneers ===
On September 21, 2022, Skule was signed to the practice squad of the Tampa Bay Buccaneers. He was released on October 18, then re-signed on November 2. He signed a reserve/future contract on January 17, 2023.

On March 15, 2024, Skule re-signed with the Buccaneers. He was named a backup tackle, starting five games as an injury fill-in.

=== Minnesota Vikings ===
On March 18, 2025, Skule signed with the Minnesota Vikings.

=== Tampa Bay Buccaneers (second stint) ===
On April 6, 2026, Skule signed a one-year contract with the Tampa Bay Buccaneers.
