= Espen Salberg =

Norwegian ballroom dancer (born 1952)

Espen Salberg (born 28 March 1952 in Oslo) is a Norwegian ballroom dancer.

== See also ==
- Dance in Norway
- List of dancers
