= Adriana Miller =

American dancer

Adriana Miller (née Menconi) ("The Legendary Adriana") (c.1936 – December 2, 2021) was born in Boston, Massachusetts during the Great Depression. After extensive studying from an early age, she pursued a career in dance, specifically jazz and Middle Eastern. During her time on stage as a jazz dancer, she worked with big names such as Frank Sinatra and Sammy Davis Jr. When she transitioned to Middle Eastern dance, she became a trendsetter and is often attributed to being a major player in the renaissance of Middle Eastern dance in Washington, DC. Her many achievements include teaching, choreography, performing as a professional dancer, producing, acting as an agent, working as a make-up artist, and designing costumes.

== Career ==
Adriana began her career with extensive training in a variety of dance forms: classical Russian ballet, jazz, modern dance, African, flamenco, classical Indian (“Bharatha-Natyam”), and Middle Eastern. During her tenure at the Boston Conservatory of Music and the Stanley Brown Dance Studios, she also received training in voice, percussion, and piano. Adriana received her first job as a Middle Eastern dance performer in Boston, Massachusetts at Zara, the first Greek club in the United States to show the dance form. Her reputation quickly preceded her as she developed shows that combined her training in dance, music, and showmanship. Adriana's performances began to set the bar for other Middle Eastern performers along the east coast.

Adriana first moved to Washington, D.C. in 1961 and performed at the Port Said, the District's first Middle Eastern club. She was one of seven belly dancers who performed every night from 8:30 pm to 2 am. The club was often packed by 9 pm, demonstrating the popularity of Near Eastern dance shows during the 60s. Shows included music and a variety of dance styles: Greek, Egyptian, Persian, Armenian, and Turkish.

Adriana opened her own dance studio in 1972: Adriana's Mecca of Middle Eastern Dance at 2338 Wisconsin Avenue, NW, in Washington, DC. At her studio, Adriana taught dance classes for all skill levels, hosted a dance troupe, provided training on make-up, skin care, and costume making, and offered classes on music theory. Her dance school was the first fully accredited, licensed, and bonded studio of that kind. At the height of its student population, the studio saw four hundred students per week. It was while teaching classes that Adriana became mentor and instructor to an up-and-coming star, Ibrahim Farrah, who went on to become a famous dancer in New York City. Her studio also had its very own dance troupe, which consisted of fifteen dancers who performed at notable places, such as the Kennedy Center, the White House, and the Smithsonian. In addition, the successful studio also had a boutique that contained dancing costumes, Middle Eastern music, decorations, and costume jewelry. The boutique employed a dressmaker and designer who made custom-made costumes for patrons. Adriana closed the dance school in 1982 due to family and health problems.

== Later years ==
After several years of working as a health care aide, Adriana returned to Washington, DC, in the 1990s. While she could no longer dance due to hip replacement surgery, she still promoted Near Eastern dance in the region. She sponsored workshops, produced shows, established the annual Middle Eastern/Mediterranean Dance Oriental Gala Revue and Awards Ceremony, and continued to share her Middle Eastern dance knowledge with the new generation through education.

Adriana described her own dancing style in a 2001 article in The Washington Post: "It was my style on the stage: I had lots of class, lots of spunk, lots of personality. I changed history when I came into the picture as a Middle Eastern dancer because of my beautiful turns, my classic style, my hand movements; [I was] very sensual on the stage, very comic on the stage. I knew how to control my audience, because I came from the American field of dance, which was the big supper night clubs."

Her love of Middle Eastern dance extended beyond performance and instruction by delving into the history as well. Adriana was interviewed by The Washington Post in 1979 to shed light on the 5,000-year history of Middle Eastern dance. As a result of her research, Miller believed that the origins of the dance form can be traced back to dances performed by African slaves. Egyptian influence can be seen in the snake-like movements and the subtle head and clasped-hand movements are mostly likely borrowed from India. Her extensive knowledge of Middle Eastern dance history was often acclaimed to have added an extra facet to her instruction and classes.

Miller died on December 2, 2021, aged 85.

== Documentary ==
- Adriana: Shadows on Yellow Silk

== Awards ==
- 1975 City of Rockville Achievement Certificate in Recognition of Outstanding Service to Senior Citizens
- 1993 Inducted into the American Academy of Middle Eastern Dance Hall of Fame
- 1998 First Place Cam Award from Community TV of Prince George's County
- 1998 Received Award from Ibrahim Farrah at the Kennedy Center

== See also ==
- List of dancers
