= István Martin =

Franco-Hungarian ballet dancer

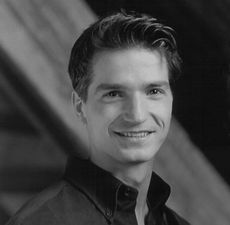
István Martin in 1998

István Martin is a Franco-Hungarian ballet dancer.

== Biography ==
After studying at the Hungarian Dance Academy, Martin worked at Vaganova Ballet Academy of Saint Petersburg.

In 1990, he was invited by Mikhail Baryshnikov to spend a month with the soloists of the American Ballet Theatre. His first professional experience was with Iván Markó, choreographer and artistic director of the Ballet of Györ.

After his first engagement in 1990/1991 at the Ballet of Györ, Martin danced in several of Markó's pieces: Dance Meditation (1992, Hungarian television), Jerusalem Lights (Spring Board Company in Israel, 1992/1993). He also danced in Desert Wanderer (Jerusalem Dance Theatre, 1993) and in the choreography of Tannhäuser (Festival of Bayreuth, 1992, 1993). At the German Opera of the Rhine (Düsseldorf) from 1993 to 1995, he danced the choreographies of Heinz Spoerli, Erich Walter, and George Balanchine.

Martin became a member of the Opéra National de Bordeaux ballet company in September 1995. With them, he danced in Don Quixote, Marco Polo, Électra, Petrushka, Danses Concertantes, Coppélia, The Prodigal Son, The Four Temperaments, The Four Seasons, Raymonda, and Aunis.

As a choreographer he created a Pas de deux titled Destinées for a gala organized by the Opéra de Nice, in homage to Janine Monin. In 2002 he created a Pas de trois titled Baile Español for the Summer Festival of Formentera, and in 2003 a choreography for the opera The Tsar's Bride performed in Bordeaux and in Paris's Châtelet.

Martin's international tours include Romeo and Juliet and Diaghilev's pieces in the United States, Coppélia in Bilbao, Giselle and The Nutcracker in Japan, Homage to Petipa in Kyiv, Suite en Blanc in Kyiv and in Biarritz, Saint Petersburg, Budapest, the Netherlands, Italy, in Sicily with Nutcracker, in San Sebastian with Coppélia and in the Liceu of Barcelona with the program Picasso.

He participated with the soloists of the Opéra National de Bordeaux in a gala in Oviedo, Málaga, Izmir, and Budapest.

Recently he danced Les Noces, The Rite of Spring and The Prodigal Son in Spain's Festival International de Musica y Danza de Granada, as well as Carlotta Ikuda's Zatoïchi.

== Artistic career ==
- Swan Lake
- The Nutcracker
- Giselle
- La Fille mal gardée
- Goldberg Variations
- A Midsummer Night's Dream
- The Firebird
- The Legend of Joseph
- Violin concerto
- The Rite of Spring
- Don Quixote
- Marco Polo
- Électra
- Petruchka
- Danses Concertantes
- Coppélia
- The Four Seasons
- Four temperaments
- Prodigal Son
- Who Cares?
- Serenade
- Before nightfall
- Purcell pieces
- The Troy Game
- Icarus
- Suite en blanc
- Continou
- Napoli
- Hydrogen Jukebox
- Tree-horned hat
- The Wooden Prince
- Romeo and Juliet
- Rajmonda
- The Wedding
- Sextet
- Valses
- Aunis
- Zatoichi
- Click-Pause-Silence
- Les Indomptés
- Sleeping Beauty
- Parade
- Messiah

== Gallery ==
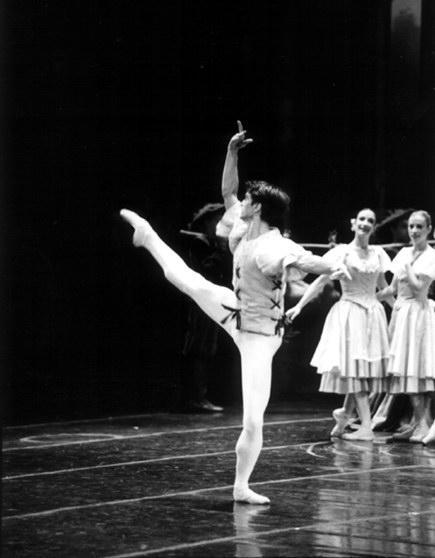

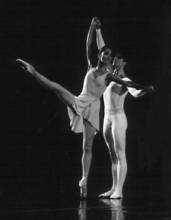

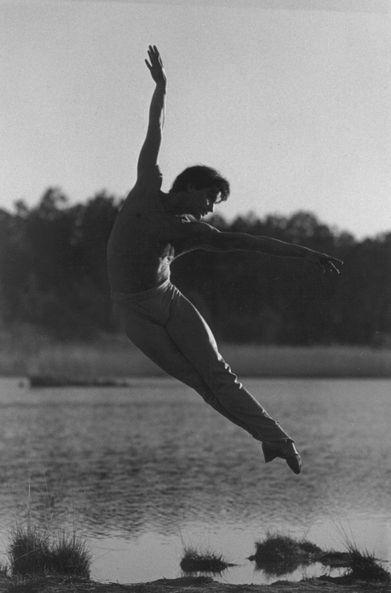

== See also ==
- List of dancers
