= Doris Uhlich =

Austrian choreographer and performer

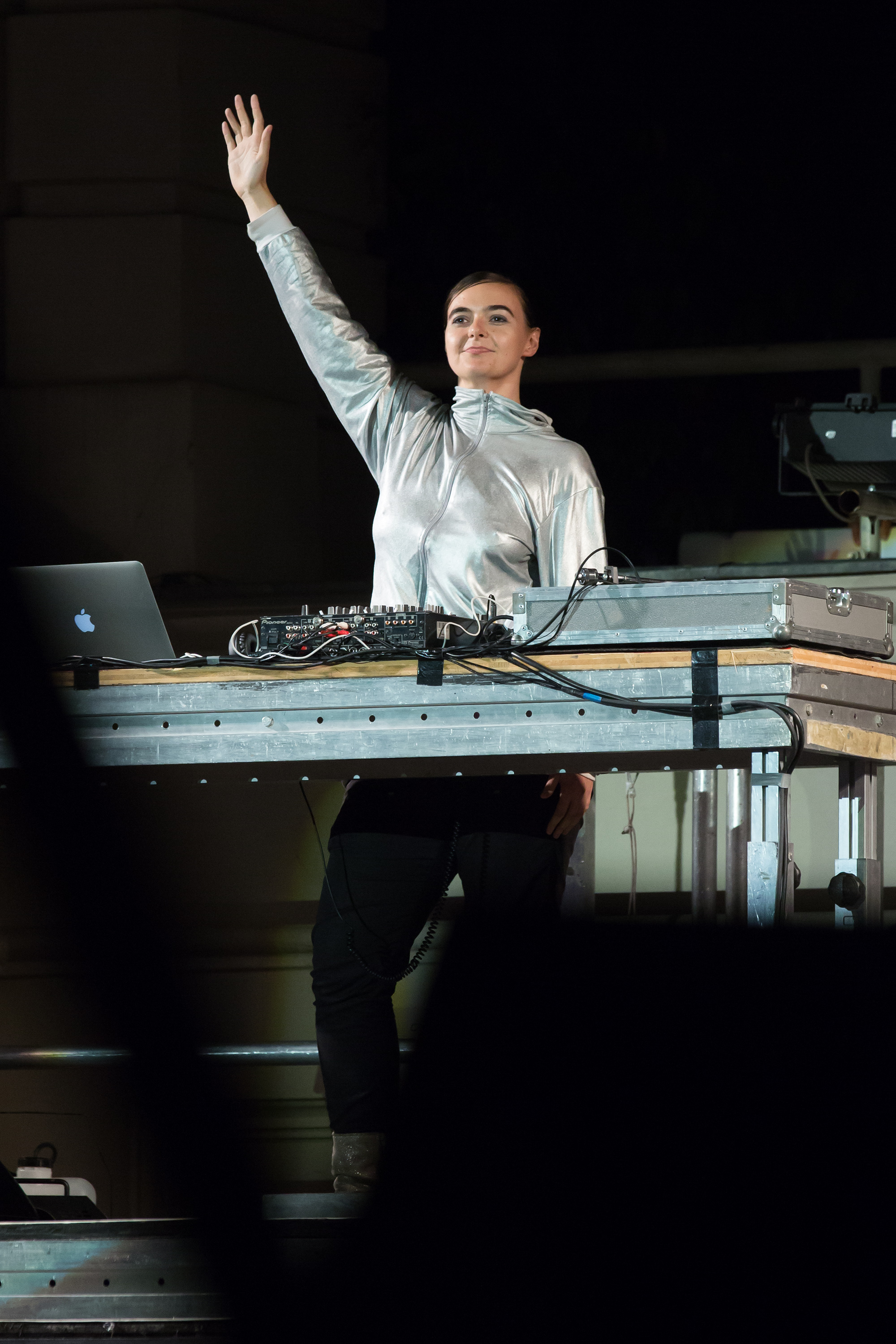
Doris Uhlich, opening of ImPulsTanz 2015

Doris Uhlich' (born 1977) is an internationally active Austrian choreographer, performer and dance teacher.

== Biography ==
Doris Uhlich studied "Pedagogy for Contemporary Dance" at the Conservatory of the City of Vienna, was a performer in the theatercombinat from 2002 to 2009 and has been developing her own artistic projects since 2006.

Working with people with different biographies and physical inscriptions, her performances often explore ideals of beauty and body norms. As a young choreographer, she began working with older people to explore the relationship between fragility and robustness in the ageing body. She then questioned classical ballet in terms of its translatability into contemporary contexts.

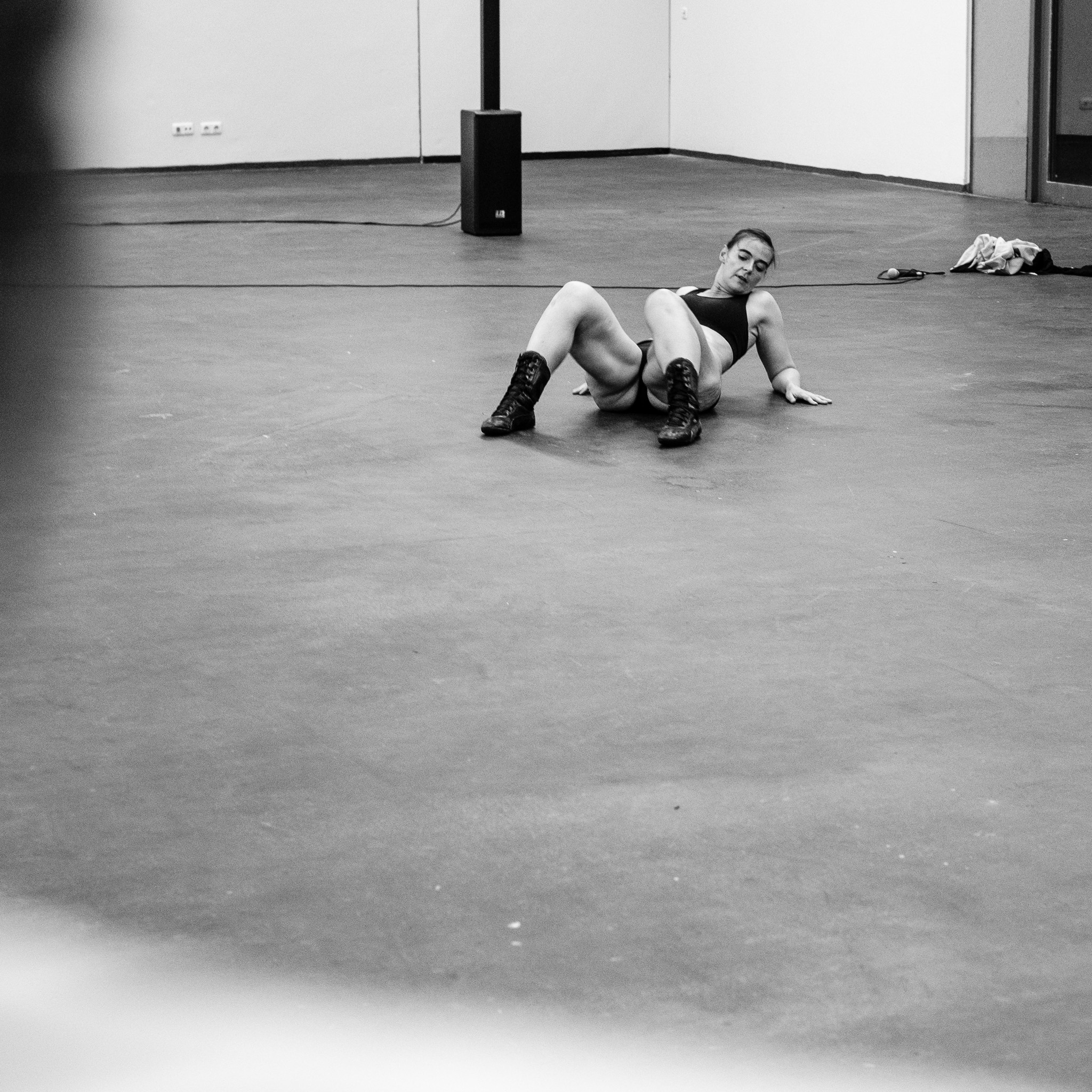
Doris Uhlich during her performance at the Perspektiven // Attersee 2019

Doris Uhlich has been extensively exploring the representation of nudity in her works since 2013. Her approach goes beyond ideology and simple eroticisation, examining the relationship between man and machine in a multi-layered way. She addresses the future of the human body in the age of surgical and genetic perfection with particular reference to the human genome.

For her series Habitat, she creates temporary large ensembles and uses different spaces, e.g. the Dominikanerkirche in Krems, the façade of the Vienna Secession and the former winter riding arena of the Austro-Hungarian Monarchy (Hall E in the MuseumsQuartier Wien).

== Works ==
=== Performances ===
- 2006: insert.eins / eskapade
- 2007: 00331452553201
- 2007: und
- 2007: Impatiens walleriana
- 2008: SPITZE
- 2009: Loggia
- 2009: Glamour
- 2009: Johannen
- 2009: mehr als genug
- 2009: Rising Swan
- 2011: Uhlich
- 2011: Sneak Preview
- 2012: Come Back
- 2013: more than naked
- 2014: Universal Dancer
- 2016: Boom Bodies
- 2016: more than naked
- 2016: Ravemachine
- 2017: Habitat / Dominikanerkirche Krems
- 2017: Habitat / Vienna Secession
- 2018: Every Body Electric
- 2019: TANK
- 2019: Unkraut
- 2019: Habitat / Hall E
- 2020: stuck
- 2020: Habitat / Hall E (pandemic version)
- 2020: Habitat / Munich (pandemic version)
- 2020: Habitat / Frankfurt (pandemic version)
- 2021: Habitat / Warsaw (pandemic version)
- 2021: Gootopia
- 2023: more than naked – 10th anniversary

=== Films ===
- 2007: sackl du printemps

== Awards ==
- 2008 mention as "remarkable young choreographer" in the yearbook of ballet-tanz
- 2008 Dance Prize of the Federal Ministry for Education, the Arts and Culture for Spitze
- 2011 named "Dancer of the Year" in the magazine tanz
- 2013 "award outstanding artist" in the field of performing arts of the Federal Ministry for Education, Arts and Culture
- 2015 Named "Dancer of the Year" in the magazine tanz
- 2017 Nestroy Prize for Ravemachine in the category Special Prize
- 2018 Named "Choreographer of the Year" in the magazine tanz
- 2019 nomination for "Choreographer of the Year" in the magazine tanz
- 2019 Audience Award for Every Body Electric at the Our Stage Festival at the Staatsschauspiel Dresden
- 2019 invitation to the Venice Biennale and São Paulo with Every Body Electric

== See also ==
- List of dancers
