= Ommi Pipit-Suksun =

Thai ballerina

Nutnaree "Ommi" Pipit-Suksun is a Thai ballerina. She was born in Bangkok, Thailand, where she trained at the Varaporn-Kanchana Ballet School. At fifteen, she left Bangkok to study at the Royal Ballet School in London, England. In 2001, Pipit-Suksun became the youngest person to win a gold medal at the Adeline Genée International Competition. She graduated in 2004 and, at the age of 19, was given a soloist contract with the San Francisco Ballet.

She was a principal dancer with Ballet San Jose (later Silicon Valley Ballet) in San Jose, California, from 2013 until the company's closure in 2016. She performed the title role in Cinderella in 2015.

== See also ==
- List of dancers
