= Sonia Destri Lie =

Brazilian dancer and choreographer

Sonia Destri Lie, often known simply as Sonia Destri, is a Brazilian dancer and choreographer. In 2005, she formed Companhia Urbana de Dança, a hip hop group, which has achieved increasing international recognition. Destri has recruited and trained dancers from Rio's favelas, whatever their social or ethnic backgrounds.

== Early life and education ==
Born in Rio de Janeiro, Destri was born into an Italian family. Her father was a company lawyer, her mother painted, and she has a sister and two brothers. She spent her childhood in one of the rather British suburbs where, following her sister's example, she attended ballet classes from the age of four. The French teacher quickly recognized her talent and she continued her training until she was 15. While she was studying psychology at the Federal University of Rio de Janeiro, she realized she could take jazz and modern dance classes in her spare time. She later graduated as a Bachelor of Fine Arts in dance.

== Career ==
Destri moved in and out of Brazil, studying jazz, classical ballet and dance at every opportunity. Training with Pina Bausch, Alwin Nikolais and Twyla Tharp, she has also gained experience in theatre, television and film, collaborating with Mauricio Sherman, Roberto Talma, Marly Tavares and Lennie Dale. In the 1990s, she went to Germany to teach contemporary dance and Brazilian jazz at Tanz Hause in Düsseldorf and in dance schools in Cologne and around Germany. She became increasingly interested in urban dance, street jazz and hip hop, both in Germany and on her return to Brazil.

As a result of her growing interests, when she returned to Brazil she set up Companhia Urbana de Dança, recruiting dancers from the poorer suburbs and favelas of Rio de Janeiro. The group came into its own after performing at the Biennale de Lyon in 2006. Since then, many of the dancers in the group have changed while Destri has consistently encouraged the participation of members of Brazil's three cultural groups, indigenous, European and African, irrespective of their social background.

The company has also performed in Biarritz (2008), Rouen (2010) and Suresnes (2011). They have also appeared at various venues in the United States. Their 2010 début at the New York City Center was ranked among the top 10 dance performances of the year. In 2013, for the first time, the group received some government funding, opening opportunities for the future.

== Awards ==
Sonia Destri has received the Best Choreography Prize from the UNESCO Conseil International de la Danse, the Staging Award (2011) from the State of Rio de Janeiro for the Companhia Urbana de Dança's Eu Danço, and the FADA Award from the City Hall of Rio de Janeiro (2012 and 2013).

== See also ==
- List of dancers
