= Centreville High School (Fairfax County, Virginia) =

Coordinates: 38°49′30″N 77°24′39″W

Location
- 6001 Union Mill Road; Clifton, Virginia 20124; United States

Information
- School type: Public, high school
- Motto: Strive for Perfection, Settle for Excellence
- Founded: February 29, 1988; 38 years ago
- School district: Fairfax County Public Schools
- Superintendent: Michelle Reid
- Principal: Dr. Erik J. Healey
- Staff: 247
- Grades: 9–12
- Enrollment: 2,535 (2016-17)
- Language: English
- Campus: Suburban
- Colors: Carolina blue, black, and silver
- Athletics conference: Concorde District; Northern Region
- Mascot: Wildcat
- Rival: Chantilly High School; Westfield High School
- Feeder schools: Liberty Middle School; Rocky Run Middle School
- Website: http://www.fcps.edu/CentrevilleHS

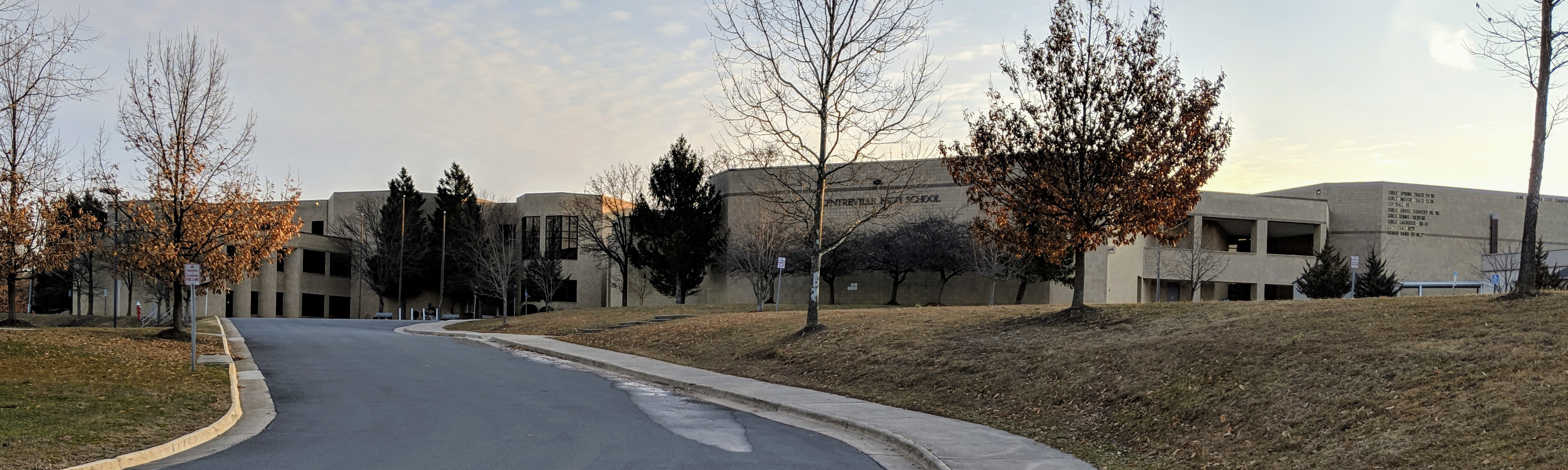
Centreville High School

Centreville High School (CVHS) is a public high school located in unincorporated southwestern Fairfax County, Virginia, north of Clifton and east of the Centreville. Having opened in 1988 to serve the rapidly growing population of the Clifton/Centreville region, CVHS is the top of the Centreville High School Pyramid in Region 4 of the Fairfax County Public School (FCPS) system. In 2010 the school was ranked as the 4th best high school in Fairfax County, and the 18th best high school out of 172 schools rated in the Washington, D.C. metropolitan area. On a national level, in 2010 CVHS was ranked as the 130th best of all high schools in the United States.

Centreville High School currently enrolls approximately 2700 students in grades 9–12. The school's students work with over 200 faculty and staff members, with the population divided between five sub-schools. The school colors are Columbia blue, black, and silver. The school is within the Clifton, Virginia zip code jurisdiction, but its physical location is closer to the unincorporated community of Centreville. Residents in the town of Clifton attend Robinson Secondary School east of Centreville.

== History ==
In the early 1980s, construction of an intermediate school serving grades 7 and 8 was proposed for Braddock Park to deal with the westward population shift in the county. Funds for the construction of the proposed Braddock Park Intermediate School were included as part of the $57.2 million school bond issue approved by a voter referendum on November 3, 1981, with the intent of the school opening in 1984.

However, fluctuating enrollment figures led the Fairfax County School Board to consider delaying construction of Braddock Park Intermediate school for a 1988 opening before finally voting on January 13, 1983, on a compromise that would see the school open in 1986.

By April 1984, Superintendent William J. Burkholder was recommending that a high school should be constructed instead of an intermediate school. Burkholder's plan was that the school would open as an intermediate school in 1988, and gradually transition to becoming a high school. This change required the addition of 10 acres to the 25-acre school site to comply with state high school property requirements.

$43.2 million of the $74.87 million school bond issue approved by a voter referendum on November 6, 1984, was earmarked for construction of what was then called Braddock Park High School, as well as several elementary schools.

In 1986, the $22.6 million contract for construction of the school was awarded to A.S. McGaughan Company. Construction of the school was temporarily shut down in August 1987 following the discovery of cancer-causing mineral asbestos in the soil. Despite early reports that the asbestos was not dangerous, it was later discovered that a large amount of the soil in Western Fairfax County is contaminated with fibrous asbestos.

In March 1988, the Fairfax County School Board set the enrollment area for the new school, based on the plan of Springfield district board member Anthony Cardinale following controversy over the plan submitted by Superintendent Robert R. Spillane.

The school board voted to name the new high school Centreville High School at its May 12, 1988 meeting, rejecting the Braddock Park name as a source of potential confusion with Lake Braddock Secondary School, although the chosen name was also the source of controversy due to Centreville being the poorer of the two communities (the other being wealthy Clifton) served by the new high school, with a reputation of being "a redneck burg".

Despite the controversy, it was as Centreville High School that the new school opened in the Fall of 1988 with a class of slightly over 1000 seventh through tenth graders. Over the next few years, the seventh and eighth grades were phased out and Centreville finally had a complement of ninth through twelfth grades.

== Administration ==
The principal of Centreville High School is Dr. Erik J. Healey. Prior to being appointed in November 2024, Healey was the Director of Student Services at Hayfield Secondary School.

Centreville High School has students assigned alphabetically to one of five sub-schools for administration and school counseling purposes. Assistant principals Angela Florio (Blue Ridge), Montell Brown (Shenandoah), Tracy Bromberg (Chesapeake), Alexis Wenzel (Commonwealth), and Sarah Lutes (Dominion) each administer one of the sub-schools and oversee a portion of the student body. In addition, the assistant principals act as administrators of the various academic departments in Centreville High School.

Principals of Centreville High School:

- William E. Trussel, Jr. (1987-1993)
- Pamela Latt (1993-2004) (died 2022)
- Peter Noonan (2004-2006)
- Michael Campbell (2006-2012)
- Martin E. Grimm (2012-2014)
- David E. Jagels (2015-2018)
- Chad R. Lehman (2019–2024)
- Erik J. Healey (2024–present)

== Demographics ==
The CVHS population includes students who were born in 84 different countries.

In the 2023–24 school year, Centreville High School's student body was 31.26% White, 31.39% Asian, 23.45% Hispanic, 8.10% Black and 5.80% Other.

In her column from September 10, 2010—the day before the 9th anniversary of 9/11—Washington Post columnist Petula Dvorak highlighted Centreville's diversity, referring to it as an example of how racial and ethnic tolerance should be celebrated.

== Theatre Centreville ==
Centreville's theatre program, currently directed by Patrick McGee, has won awards, including Cappies in several categories under the direction of prior director Mike Hudson.

== Notable alumni ==
- Corbyn Besson, member of boy band Why Don't We
- Jayson Blair, former New York Times journalist found to have plagiarized his articles.
- Luke Bowanko, center for NFL's Washington Redskins.
- Ludacris (Christopher Brian Bridges), rapper, entrepreneur, and actor.
- Lindsay Czarniak, attended James Madison University, sports reporter for ESPN.
- Tony Dews, assistant coach for the Tennessee Titans.
- Marcus Hamilton, selected by Tampa Bay Buccaneers in seventh round (245th overall) of 2007 NFL draft.
- Daniel Kuzemka, soccer player for Charleston Battery
- Michael League, Grammy-winning musician
- Bjorn Merten, All-American football player for UCLA.
- Will Montgomery, selected by Carolina Panthers in seventh round (234th overall) of 2006 NFL draft; played for Washington Redskins, Denver Broncos.
- Justin J. Pearson, politician and activist
- Jenna Richmond, former professional soccer player
- Justin Skule, selected by San Francisco 49ers in the sixth round (183rd overall) of the 2019 NFL draft.
- James Stevens, former professional soccer player
- Kobie Turner, defensive end for the Los Angeles Rams, drafted by the Los Angeles Rams in the third round with the 89th pick of the 2023 NFL draft
- Nicole de Weever, professional dancer
- Amita Rao, comedian and actress
