= HealthTap =

Medical group and technology company

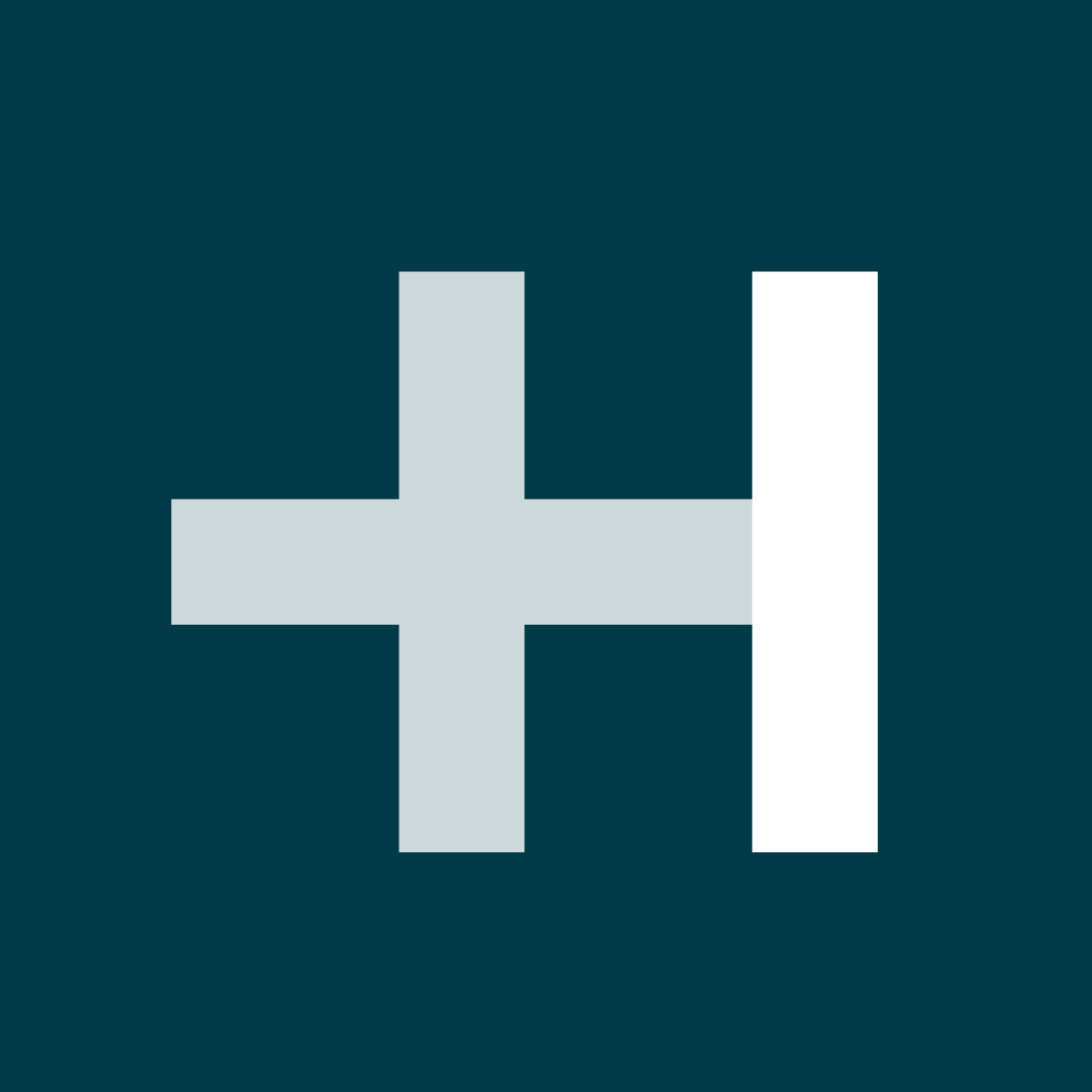
- Type: Private
- Industry: Healthcare Technology
- Founded: 2010
- Headquarters: Sunnyvale, California
- Number of locations: 0 (online only)
- Area served: United States
- Key people: Sean Mehra (CEO); Geoffrey Rutledge (CMO); Bill Gossman (CFO); Hammad Saleem (CIO); Greg Gilley (CTO)
- Products: HealthTap.com, HealthTap app
- Number of employees: ~100
- Website: www.healthtap.com

HealthTap is a medical group and technology company delivering telehealth virtual healthcare via the web and health apps. Their customers include health consumers in the United States, health systems, insurance companies, and self-insured employers.

The company has received Series A funding from the Mayfield Fund, Eric Schmidt’s Innovation Endeavors and Mohr Davidow Ventures.

HealthTap offers the option to immediately connect to, or schedule an appointment with, a physician for a consultation via video conference, phone call, or text chat via web or mobile application.

== Interactive health ==
Health information on the service is supplied interactively by a network of nearly 140,000 licensed doctors in good standing (licensed physicians with active disciplinary actions against them are not admitted to the network). HealthTap also provides the opportunity for peer review, which consists of doctors rating each other and self-identifying specializations. The company says its doctor network is present in 170 countries.

== Press and expansion ==
HealthTap has garnered media coverage in publications including The New York Times, Forbes and TIME.

HealthTap started its Medical Expert Network with U.S.–licensed OBGYN and Pediatrics physicians which the company describes as the largest network of interactive, engaged physicians online.

In December 2011, the company announced that it had secured $11.5 million in Series A funding, led by The Mayfield Fund, Eric Schmidt’s Innovation Endeavors and Mohr Davidow Ventures.

In November 2012, they acquired the doctor directory and rating business from Avvo.

In March 2016, HealthTap acquired Docphin, a startup designed to make finding and reading medical research easier for doctors.

In December 2017, the New Zealand Government's Auditor General launched a review into the cancelled implementation of a HealthTap-based system at the Government's Waikato District Health Board. The results of the review were overwhelmingly negative and found, amongst other things, that the platform was not fit for purpose.
