= Avvo =

American marketplace for legal services

Avvo.com
- Website type: Legal Services
- Founded: June 5, 2007; 19 years ago
- Headquarters: Seattle, Washington, U.S.
- Founders: Mark Britton; Paul Bloom; Sendi Widjaja
- Key people: Suke Jawanda
- Industry: Internet
- Parent: Internet Brands
- Website: avvo.com

Avvo.com is an American online marketplace for legal services. It provides lawyer referrals and access to a database of legal information consisting primarily of previously answered questions. Lawyer profiles include client reviews, disciplinary actions, peer endorsements, and lawyer-submitted legal guides.

== History ==
Avvo was founded in Seattle, Washington in 2006 by Mark Britton, a former legal counsel for Expedia, Inc. and Paul Bloom. Britton said he developed the idea while vacationing in Italy and was still receiving inquires from friends and colleagues seeking legal advice. Rich Barton, the founder of the Expedia, Inc. and real-estate database Zillow.com, was a key advisor during the initial ideation stages and still serves on the board of directors. Avvo was derived from “avvocato”, the Italian word for lawyer.

The company was initially financed with $13 million in venture capital from Benchmark Capital and Ignition Partners. Subsequently, Avvo raised $71.5 million in financing in 2015, which brings the company's total financing to $132 million.

In 2018, Avvo entered a deal to be acquired by Internet Brands.

== Business model ==
Avvo generates revenue by selling legal services, advertising, and other services primarily to lawyers. Avvo operates as a scraper site to generate its lawyer listing pages causing the District of Columbia Bar Association to specifically object to its business practices.

== Lawyer directory ==
According to the website, the directory provides comprehensive profiles, client reviews, peer endorsements, and its own proprietary rating for more than 97% of all licensed attorneys in the United States. Avvo lawyer profiles are aggregated from public records provided by state bars and additional attorney licensing entities. Avvo will not delete any lawyer's profile, and has been criticized for including profiles of deceased lawyers.

As of 2010, Avvo's directory includes ratings of lawyers in all 50 states and the District of Columbia. The District of Columbia Bar Association released its position about Avvo:

The Bar has not entered into any agreement with Avvo; instead, Avvo has obtained Bar member information directly from the Bar’s Web site, in violation of our restrictions on use, and used that information for its own commercial purposes. The Bar has asked Avvo to remove all improperly acquired D.C. Bar member information from its Web site, cease all attempts to acquire such information from the Bar’s Web site, and cease using improperly acquired information for any commercial purpose.

== Lawyer ratings ==
Avvo presents ratings of lawyers that are included in its directory, based upon a proprietary algorithm. Avvo cautions users that a rating "is not an endorsement of any particular lawyer, and is not a guarantee of a lawyer's quality, competency, or character. Nor is the Avvo Rating a predictor of the outcome of any matter in which such lawyer is involved."

Avvo's rating system has been criticized and has inspired some controversy. When sued by lawyers who object to the ratings, Avvo has successfully defended against the lawsuits by asserting that the ratings constitute a constitutionally protected opinion.

=== Browne v. Avvo ===
A lawsuit was filed on June 14, 2007, nine days after Avvo's launch, by Seattle attorneys, John Henry Browne and Alan Wenokur. The suit alleged that Avvo's rating system made false claims of being factual and was therefore deceptive and libelous and violated the Washington Consumer Protection Act. United States District Court Judge Robert Lasnik ruled that the rating system was only an opinion and was thus protected by the First Amendment right of free speech. The judge wrote, "Neither the nature of the information provided nor the language used on the Web site would lead a reasonable person to believe that the ratings are a statement of actual fact."

After the ruling, an editorial in The Wall Street Journal endorsed the website for providing "at least some measure of transparency" of the legal profession.

== New Jersey ==
The New Jersey State Bar Association sent an inquiry to the Advisory Committee on Professional Ethics asking if New Jersey attorneys may participate in certain online, non-lawyer, corporately owned services specifically naming Avvo and other online services. As a result of that inquiry, the Advisory Committee on Professional Ethics, Committee on Attorney Advertising, and Committee on the Unauthorized Practice of Law issued a joint opinion. The joint opinion stated that New Jersey attorneys may not participate in Avvo Legal services as it is against the rule of professional conduct.

== Doctor directory ==
Avvo's doctor directory launched in 2010. Avvo's health business was sold to HealthTap in 2012.

== Security incidents ==
In 2022, evidence appeared that Avvo had suffered a data breach, exposing the email addresses of four million accounts.
