= Ranjabati Sircar =

Indian dancer and choreographer (1963–1999)

- Born: 29 March 1963; Nsukka, Nigeria
- Died: 23 October 1999 (aged 36); Bombay, India
- Occupations: Dancer, choreographer
- Known for: Nava Nritya (New Dance)
- Mother: Manjusri Chaki-Sircar

Ranjabati Sircar (29 March 1963 – 23 October 1999) was an Indian dancer and choreographer noted for her contributions to experimental and contemporary Indian dance forms.

== Early life ==
Sircar was born in Nsukka, Nigeria and spent much of her childhood in upstate New York. She was the only child of dancer Manjusri Chaki-Sircar (1934–2000), a leading figure in Indian classical and experimental dance. Sircar later studied at Jadavpur University in Calcutta, where she earned two degrees and received several academic honours. Though she showed potential for an academic career, she chose to pursue dance, following her mother's experimental artistic direction.

== Career ==
Together with her mother, Sircar founded the Dancers’ Guild in Calcutta, an institution dedicated to Nava Nritya (also known as Navanritya), a contemporary Indian dance form blending classical and folk movements with modern influences. Her work incorporated elements of yoga and martial arts and explored themes such as spirituality, environmentalism and female identity.

Sircar travelled extensively and worked in international collaborations. In 1983, she studied in Great Britain on a British Council scholarship and later became the first artistic director of Yuva, the national South Asian youth dance company in Britain. Her choreography Thirsting Earth earned the Time Out/Dance Umbrella Award.

== Later life and death ==
Sircar continued to choreograph and perform internationally, collaborating with artists across Europe and India. She lived in Calcutta until her death on 23 October 1999 at the age of 36. The cause of death was not publicly known. At the time of her death she was involved in fundraising for a new school under the Dancers’ Guild.

== See also ==
- List of dancers
