= Docphin =

Medical search engine

- Website type: Search engine
- Founded: May 2012; 14 years ago
- Owner: HealthTap (since 2016)
- Industry: Medicine
- Website: www.docphin.com

Docphin is a mobile and web platform for medical professionals. Launched in May 2012, Docphin helps medical professionals access medical research, landmark articles, and search for relevant medical research more easily. Docphin is available on the web, iOS, and Android. Docphin was selected by Apple as one of the best new iOS apps in 2014. In 2016, the virtual healthcare platform HealthTap acquired DocPhin.
