= Lamun Yamakhup =

Thai classical dancer (1905–1982)

Lamun Yamakhup (Thai: ลมุล ยมะคุปต์, 1905 – 1982) was a Thai classical dancer. She studied at the Royal Court Theatre at Petchaboon Palace. She also created the dance program at the College of Dramatic Arts in Bangkok.

In June 2017, she was honored by Google with a Google Doodle.

== See also ==
- List of dancers
