= Manlee Kongprapad =

Thai dancer (1884–1971)

- Born: January 20, 1884; Bangkok Yai district
- Died: November 5, 1971 (aged 87)
- Occupation: Dancer

Manlee Kongprapad (Thai: มัลลี คงประภัศร์; RTGS: Manli Khongpraphat; 20 January 1884 – 5 November 1971) was a Thai dancer.

Manlee Kongprapad was born in Bangkok Yai district on 20 January 1884. She was raised by a single mother who worked in a palace kitchen. Growing up in a royal palace, she was exposed to dance, and briefly ran away from her mother to learn choreography. She became a proficient dancer and one of the most notable dancers in the royal court. She became one of the first dance teachers at the School of Drama and Musicology, later renamed to the College of Dramatic Arts.

On 20 January 2019, she was featured in a Google Doodle to celebrate her legacy.

== See also ==
- List of dancers
