= Amera Eid =

Australian bellydancer

Amera Eid (Arabic: أميرة عيد) is an Australian bellydancer who practices Egyptian style Sharqi dancing. She founded the first Egyptian bellydance boutique in Australia.

Eid is of Egyptian and European background. Her parents were born in Port Said and Shoubra, Egypt, emigrating to Australia in the early 1960s. Exposed to Egyptian music and dance from a young age, she began professional training in belly dance with Rozeta Ahalyea in Sydney in 1983 and worked the restaurant and Arabic nightclub circuit. She appeared as a support act in concerts for visiting singers such as Mona Merashli, George Wassouf, Rageb Alame, Rabih El Kholi, Amr Diab, Ehab Toufik, Melham Baraket, Tony Mohanna, Mayez Al Bayah, Pascal Mashalany, and Nawal El Zoughby.

Eid opened Amera's Palace in 1987, which included one of the first bellydance schools in Sydney. The school operated in Sheiks Tent nightclub on weeknights. In the days before the internet the boutique acted as the hub of information on bellydancing in Australia through The Palace newsletter, which ultimately became a biannual magazine. The magazine merged with Bellydance Oasis magazine in late 2006.

In 1990, Eid met Lebanese agent Toros Siranossian, and became one of only a handful of non-Arabic dancers on his books. For the next seven years, Eid lived in Beirut and performed throughout the Middle East on continuous contracts arranged by Siranossian. Between 1994 and 1999 Eid also traveled regularly to Egypt, where she trained with top choreographers Raqia Hassan, Ibrahim Akef and Aida Nour, and also performed two contracts in 1999.

Eid returned to Australia and retired as a professional dancer but continued to teach and run international workshops. In 2008 she hosted THE FARHA TOUR to Australia, the first time an international calibre belly dance event occurred in the Southern Hemisphere. In 2010 she hosted the famous Dina Talaat for workshops and a concert.

In 2013 she sold Amera's Palace to dancer and musician Ali Higson. It is the only dedicated belly dance store in Australia with a physical shopfront as well as a website (all others are online only).

Eid now concentrates on teaching belly dancing privately, and workshops nationally, and continues her passion of working in foster care for children.

== Performances ==
- Amman Jordan Jerusalem hotel (2 months 1991, 1992 & 1993)
- Amman Jordan Intercontinental hotel (2 months 1994)
- Amman Jordan Regency Palace (2 months 1995)
- Aswan Basma Hotel (1999)
- Egypt Sharm el Sheik Gazala Gardens (1999)
- Greece Athens Shahraman Restaurant (4 months 1991)
- Greece Dubai Singapore New Caledonia (1985–1989)
- India New Delhi Hyatt Hotel (New Year's Eve 1989)
- Ivory Coast Abidjan - Al Sultan Restaurant (2 months 1995)
- Lebanon Beirut : Summerland Hotel (2 months New year 1995/96)
- Muscat Omman Al Bustan Palace (3 mths 1993)
- Syria Lattaquia Le Meridien (2 months 1994)
- Syria Le Meridien Hotel (2 months 1995)
- U.A.E Dubai Claridge hotel ( 2 months 1994 & 1996)
- U.A.E. Abu Dhabi Gulf Hotel (3 months 1992)
- U.A.E. Al Ain Intercontinental Hotel ( 2 months 1993 1994 & 1995)
- U.A.E. Al Ain Hilton Hotel (1 month 1992)
- U.A.E. Dubai St George hotel (2 months 1996)
- U.A.E. Dubai Carlton Tower hotel (2 months 1995)
- U.A.E. Dubai Vendome Plaza Hotel (2 months 1993 & 1994)

== See also ==
- List of dancers
