= Alphonse Tierou =

Alphonse Tierou (born 17 April 1946) is a French dancer, choreographer, and scholar of dance originally from Ivory Coast.

== Life and career ==
Tierou is a former student of the National Institute of Arts at Abidjan.

He theorized and codified African dance and defined an African dance vocabulary, using ten basic movements that are common to all African cultures.

In 1988, Unesco hired him as a consultant for research into dance in Africa through 1996.

From 1993 to 1996 he trained dancers and choreographs during a 3-year tour in 20 African countries.

He initiated "Premières Rencontres de la Création chorégraphique panafricaine", the First Pan-African dance contest, in Luanda, Angola in 1995, and served as its artistic director.

He is the founder and director of the Resources, Pedagogy and Research Centre for African Creation in Paris. He teaches African dance and conceives choreographic creations.

Tierou authored more than a dozen books, as well as articles and conferences on African dance and culture. His works were the first to propose a theory of African dance, with a Pan-African approach and a focus on dialogue between cultures.

He conceives and organises exhibitions on African dance, and its relationship with traditional African masks and African sculpture.

== Works ==
- Tiérou, Alphonse (2013) [1992]. Dooplé: The Eternal Law of African Dance. London: Routledge. ISBN 978-0-203-06603-4. OCLC 900236203.

== See also ==
- List of dancers
