= Nicole de Weever =

St. Maarten's dancer (born 1979)

- Born: Nicole Chantal de Weever; 1979 (age 46–47); Cay Hill, Sint Maarten, Netherlands Antilles
- Occupations: dancer, choreographer
- Years active: 2001–present
- Parents: Wilfred de Weever (father); Beatrice Vlaun (mother)

Nicole de Weever (born 1979) is a dancer and choreographer from Sint Maarten. After completing her primary schooling in the Caribbean, she moved to the United States, completing education. She has performed in film, on television and appeared on Broadway in the musical Fela! during its initial run in 2009 and reprise in 2012, after a world tour. She was honored as a cultural ambassador by the government of Sint Maarten in 2009.

== Early life ==
Nicole Chantal de Weever was born in 1979 in Cay Hill, Sint Maarten, Netherlands Antilles, to Beatrice (née Vlaun) and Wilfred de Weever. Her father was a general manager of a business and her mother worked in the civil service. From a young age, de Weever wanted to pursue a career in dance. After graduating from her primary schooling at the St. Maarten Academy, and taking dance lessons at the Motiance Dance School under the tutelage of Arlene Halley and Cees van Doldren, de Weever moved to Fairfax, Virginia and completed her secondary schooling at Centreville High School. During her high schooling, she was selected to participate in a magnet program with twenty-five students at the Governor's School for the Arts on the campus of the University of Richmond and she trained with the Fairfax Ballet Company. Furthering her education at the Tisch School of the Arts in New York City, de Weever graduated in 2001.

== Career ==
De Weever began her career teaching in programs offered through the New York City Board of Education, teaching at public and private schools. She was selected to demonstrate the techniques of Katherine Dunham for a project of the Library of Congress, Preserving American Dance History, and was a featured performer in the PBS documentary Dancing with Life. She has performed with a variety of dance companies, including Ballet Noir, Creative Outlet Dance Theatre and Forces of Nature Dance Theatre. She has toured throughout the United States and performed in Africa and Asia.

In 2008, she was selected as one of the ensemble who performed as the wives of Kuti in the Broadway production of the musical Fela!. The musical was premiered off-Broadway and opened in 2009 on Broadway at the Eugene O'Neill Theatre, running fifteen months. That same year, the government of St Maarten honored her as a cultural ambassador for bringing recognition to the island. After the show completed its Broadway run, de Weever was part of the musical's worldwide tour for a year before appearing in the reopening on Broadway in 2012.

In addition to her work in dance, de Weever founded a non-profit organization, Art Saves Lives, on Sint Maarten in 2012. The NGO uses art therapy to assist troubled youth and helps them learn creative means of expression. It also organizes workshops for students to learn from noted Caribbean artists and provides cultural exchange programs where students can visit other islands in the Caribbean or in the United States to develop their skills.

== See also ==
- List of dancers
