= G. Hepburn Wilson =

Dancer

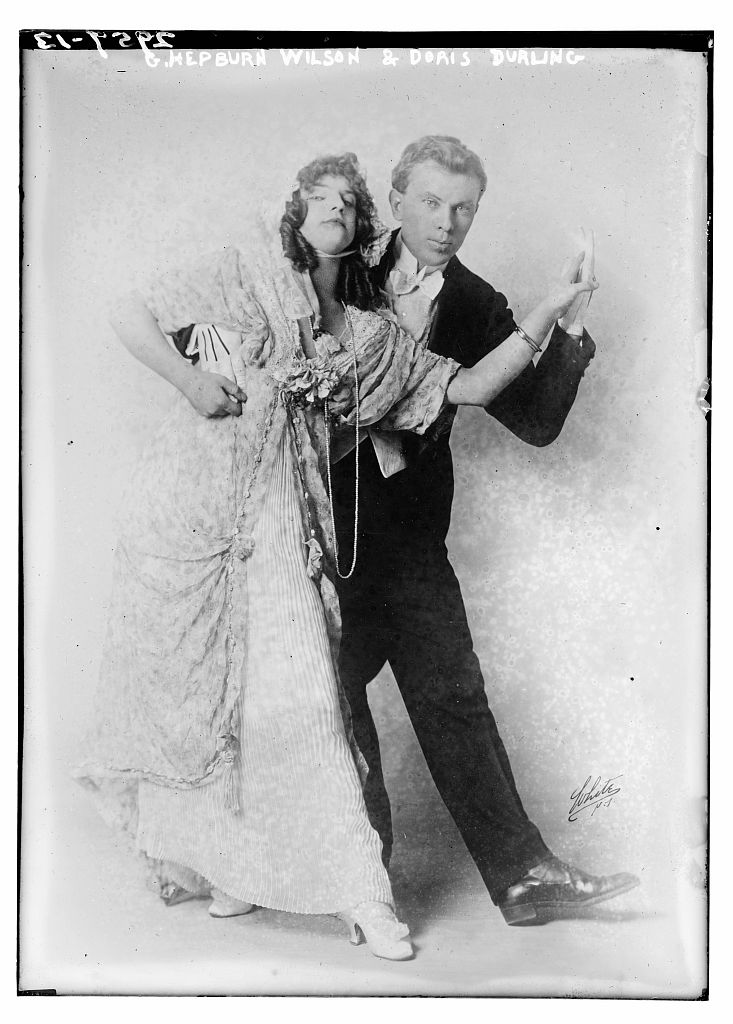
Dance instructor George Hepburn Wilson (b. 1875) with his niece, Doris Durling

George Hepburn Wilson (June 17, 1875 – ?) was an American dance instructor and a writer and editor of Modern Dance magazine. He also supervised jazz recordings by Prince's Band. He was the first dance master to advertise widely in the newspapers for individual pupils. Wilson was at odds with the established American National Association of Masters of Dancing, describing the foxtrot and the one-step as dances of a bygone age and advocating jazz dancing, the ramble and the toddle.

== See also ==
- List of dancers
