= Raymond and Joyce Callis =

Ballroom dancers

Raymond William Callis (born 17 June 1934) and Joyce Callis (formerly Joyce Waudby born 19 April 1940) both competed during the 1960s as amateur ballroom dancing competitors winning both area and county championships. They became professional competitors during 1969 and retired from competition during 1972 to concentrate on their dancing school; Callis Waudby for Dancing. A highlight of their professional competition period was dancing the Tango in the semi-final of the British Professional Championships in Blackpool. They professionally won the Yorkshire championships and the London Purse winners. As amateurs, they won over 100 amateur trophies including east coast open championships, northeast open area champions, east of England champions, North Wales champions, Yorkshire county champions, Premier champions, Scottish open medalists, North of England champions and the 1st Pontins Amateur Trophy.

Joyce Callis, dancing as Joyce Waudby, won the All England Ballet Championship, Ruth French Trophy both in London and the Butlin's Ballet Championship. Joyce is also an advance member of the Royal Academy of Dancing.

Raymond and Joyce specialised in teaching adult and children beginners and entering pupils for medal tests. They went on to hold the biggest medal test in the world for the IDTA at that time, with nearly 700 medal tests entered.

== See also ==
- List of dancers
