= Helena Cholewicka =

Polish ballerina (1848–1883)

Helena Antonina Cholewicka
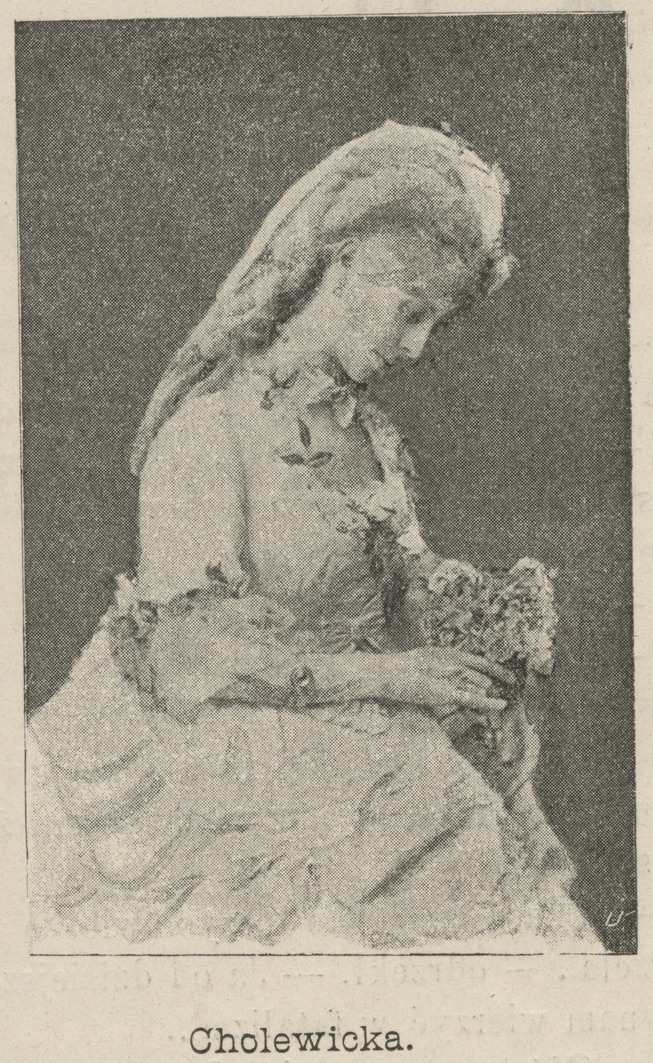
- Helena Cholewicka as the florist Jadwiga in the ballet Pan Twardowski, 1874
- Born: 20 January 1848; Warsaw
- Died: 13 December 1883 (aged 35); Nice, France
- Occupation: Prima ballerina assoluta

Helena Antonina Cholewicka (20 January 1848 – 13 December 1883) was a Polish ballet artist and the only titular "prima ballerina assoluta" in the history of the Warsaw Government Theatres.

== Biography ==
She was the daughter of Franciszek Józef and Maria (née Wojciechowska) Cholewicka. Her sister Teodora also became a dancer. Her aunt was Konstancja Wiktoria Rokossowska (née Cholewicka), grandmother of the later Marshal of the USSR and Poland Konstanty Rokossowski. Konstancja Wiktoria and Franciszek Józef were half-siblings as they had the same father.

Helena was a student of the ballet school of the Teatr Wielki. While still a student in 1862, she danced the cancan from the ballet The Modniarki (debut) and as a butterfly in the ballet The Pink Genius. On 1 September 1862, she was engaged to join the ballet company of the Warsaw Government Theatres. She was exceptionally talented and already on 13 March 1864, she danced the title role in La Sylphide, and in December 1866 also the role of Zelina in The Sea Robber. In 1867, the management of the Warsaw Government Theatre (WTR) sent her to Milan and Paris, where for some time she studied under the supervision of the legendary romantic ballerina Maria Taglioni, who was then a teacher at the ballet school of the Paris Opera.

After returning to Warsaw, on 1 October 1868, she danced the title role in Giselle and appeared as Medora in The Corsair (1869). She took over the last three roles after the emigration of the previous prima ballerina of the Teatr Wielki, Kamila Stefańska. She also danced, among others, Lizetta (Córka złe ochronna, 1870), Henrietta (Dancerze europejscy w Chiny) and Helena (Figle szatana, 1870). She was extremely beautiful and highly praised for her diligence, and enjoyed great sympathy from the audience. She quickly took a leading place in the ballet company.

According to one reviewer, "She was a dancer with a delicate, frail build and 'a superficiality that was not at all attractive, somehow sad', but she was distinguished not only by her versatile talent, but also by her extraordinary diligence, which allowed her to achieve an excellent technical level. Her dance had exceptional charm, lightness, airiness and elegance, so in a short time she took a leading position in the WTR ballet company.

On 29 January 1872, she was the first and only person in the history of the Warsaw ballet scene to receive the title of "prima ballerina assoluta", awarded to her by the then governor of the Kingdom of Poland, Fyodor Berg. She also performed other leading ballet roles, including in Meluzyna, 1873, Jotcie, 1876, Catherine, the Bandit's Daughter, 1879, and also as Jadwiga the Florist (Pan Twardowski, 1874), Freya (The Goddess of Valhalla, 1875), Topaz (Flick and Flock, 1870), Adelina (The Modniarki, 1878) and Tasyr the Priestess (India, 1880). She received a salary of 3,000 rubles a year and 25 rubles for each performance.

In January and February 1873 she danced as a guest at the San Carlo Theatre in Naples, Italy, where she was awarded the Gold Medal, and in July of that year she appeared three times on the stage of the Vienna Opera, Austria.

Since her youth, she had been treated for tuberculosis, but despite regular trips to health resorts, she had to end her career prematurely. She first asked for leave in 1878, but was asked to perform for several more years. She danced for the last time on 3 November 1881 (solo part in a divertissement from the opera Elda). On 16 June 1882, a farewell benefit performance was organized for her at the Grand Theater, in which all the companies of the Warsaw Government Theaters took part but she did not dance though she enjoyed a thunderous ovation at the conclusion. Because she was forced to end her career early, she had difficulties qualifying to receive her state pension. An intervention in St. Petersburg caused her to receive it, but only months before the end of her life. By then, in 1882, she had left for Nice, on the French Riviera where she died 13 December 1883 at 35.

Based on her life and career, Weronika Wierzchowska wrote a novel about the ballerina entitled The Dancer in 2017.

== See also ==
- List of dancers
