= James Stevens (soccer, born 1984) =

German-born American soccer player

Personal information
- Full name: James Stevens
- Date of birth: July 16, 1984 (age 42)
- Place of birth: Würzburg, Germany
- Height: 6 ft 7 in (2.01 m)
- Position: Forward

Team information
- Current team: Real Maryland Monarchs
- Number: 13

Youth career
- 2002–2005: Lehigh Mountain Hawks

Senior career*
Years	Team	Apps	(Gls)
2006	Harrisburg City Islanders	8	(2)
2007–2008	Northern Virginia Royals	20	(3)
2009	West Texas United Sockers	1	(0)
2009	Real Maryland Monarchs	13	(1)
- * Club domestic league appearances and goals as of 13 April 2010

James "Jim" Stevens (born July 16, 1984, in Würzburg) is a German-born American soccer player who last played for Real Maryland Monarchs in the USL Second Division.

== Career ==
=== College ===
Stevens grew up in Clifton, Virginia, attended Centreville High School, and played four years of college soccer at Lehigh University, where he was a Second-Team All-Patriot League selection junior. At 6'7", he was one of the tallest players in college soccer, which earned him the nickname "Tall" among the Lehigh players.

=== Professional ===
Stevens began his professional career in 2006 when he signed with the Harrisburg City Islanders in the USL Second Division. He made his professional debut on June 3, 2006, in a 3–0 win over the Long Island Rough Riders.

Stevens dropped down a division to play for the Northern Virginia Royals as an over age player in the USL Premier Development League in 2007, and stayed with the Royals for two seasons before moving back to USL2 with the Real Maryland Monarchs in 2009.
