= Vaour =

- Commune
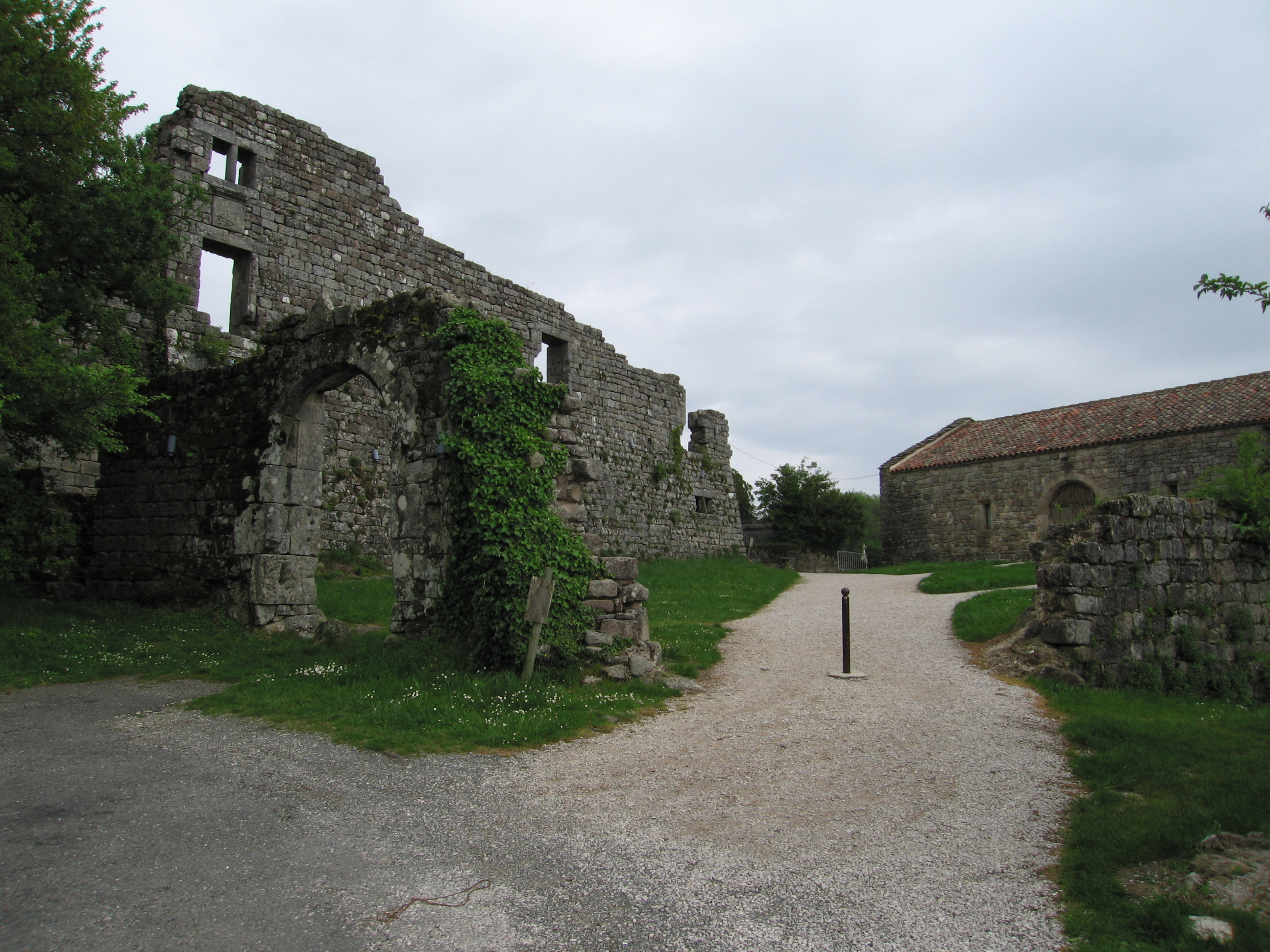
- The former Commandry of Vaour

- Coat of arms
- Location of Vaour
- Location within France Location within Occitanie
- Coordinates: 44°04′23″N 1°48′09″E
- Country: France
- Region: Occitania
- Department: Tarn
- Arrondissement: Albi
- Canton: Carmaux-2 Vallée du Cérou

Government
  - Mayor (2021–2026): Jérémie Steil
- Area^{1}: 14.12 km^{2} (5.45 sq mi)
- Elevation: 432 m (1,417 ft)
- Highest elevation: 507 m (1,663 ft)
- Lowest elevation: 240 m (790 ft)
- Population (2023): 393
  - Density: 27.8/km^{2} (72.1/sq mi)
- Time zone: UTC+01:00 (CET)
  - Summer (DST): UTC+02:00 (CEST)
- INSEE/Postal code: 81309 /81140
- ^{1} French Land Register data, which excludes lakes, ponds, glaciers > 1 km^{2} (0.386 sq mi or 247 acres) and river estuaries.

Vaour (French pronunciation: [vauʁ]; Occitan: Vaur) is a commune and cantonal administrative centre located in the northwestern part of the Tarn department in southern France.

On the north the commune borders the Tarn and Garonne department, and the rising land consists of a gray limestone causse stretching almost to the Averyon river seven or eight kilometers away. Below the commune to the south the landscape consists of the forest of Grésigne - the largest oak forest in the midi - its hills scattered with grassy meadows, and the vineyards of Gaillac.

Vaour contains the ruins of a Templar Commanderie which overlooks the village of Vaour and has commanding views to the South West towards the Pyrenees. The commune also hosts a performing arts festival each summer known as the Été de Vaour which attracts visitors and performers from across France and further afield. The village hosts a market for good local produce each Thursday in the village square.

== See also ==
- Communes of the Tarn department
