= Annetta Pelucchi =

American dancer

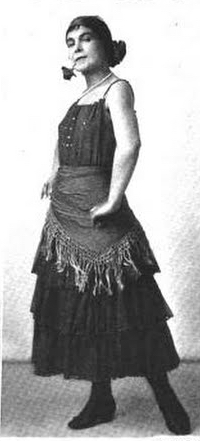
- Annetta Pelucchi, from a 1918 publication
- Born: Italy
- Other names: Annette Pelucchi, Annetta Blanchard
- Occupation: Dancer

Annetta Pelucchi was a dancer with the Chicago Opera Company.

== Early life ==
Pelucchi was born in Italy, the daughter of an Italian army officer. Her mother was French. She studied dance in Milan.

== Career ==
Pelucchi danced with the Opéra-Comique in Paris. She moved to the United States and became premiere danseuse with the Chicago Opera Ballet in 1917. She danced in operas of the 1917–1918 season, including Les Huguenots starring Myrna Sharlow and Rosa Raisa, The Jewels of the Madonna starring Giulio Crimi, Azora starring Anna Fitziu, Louise starring Geneviève Vix, and Lakmé and La traviata, both starring Amelita Galli-Curci.

== Personal life ==
Pelucchi married Massachusetts legislator and writer Arthur Franklyn Blanchard in 1918.
