= Tia Doca =

- Born: Jilçaria Cruz Costa; 20 December 1932 (age 93); Rio de Janeiro, RJ, Brazil
- Died: 25 January 2009 (aged 76); Rio de Janeiro, RJ, Brazil
- Other name: Tia Doca da Portela
- Occupations: Samba composer singer
- Years active: 1970–2008
- Spouse: Altair Costa
- Children: 3

Jilçaria Cruz Costa, known as Tia Doca da Portela or Tia Doca (20 December 1932 – 25 January 2009) was a Brazilian samba composer and singer. She began working as a flagbearer for the samba school Unidos da Congonha and joined the Velha Guarda da Portela in 1970, performing samba music and sang in various events the school promoted in countries such as France, Italy and the United States. Doca recorded music on several albums from 1970 to 2007 with such artists as Beth Carvalho and Zeca Pagodinho.

== Early life ==
Doca was born Jilçaria Cruz Costa on 20 December 1932 in Rio de Janeiro, RJ, Brazil. Her mother, Dona Albertinha, was Prazer da Serrinha's inaugural flagbearer. Doca began going to watch her mother perform the samba from the age of five, and she began working as a flagbearer for the samba school Unidos da Congonha in Rio de Janeiro's Vaz Lobo neighbourhood.

== Career ==
Following a suggestion by Alberto Lonato, she joined the Velha Guarda da Portela in 1970. Doca did the samba and sang during her time at the school in various events that it promoted in locations such as France, Italy and the United States. She recorded music on several records and CDs that were released between 1970 and 2007 and recorded with such artists as Beth Carvalho and Zeca Pagodinho. She also worked as a maid and weaver prior to her focusing fully on samba music.

In 1970, Doca released Portela, passado de glória on LP and followed with Portela Selo Marcos Pereira on the same medium four years later. She went on to be featured on both Monarco e Velha-Guarda da Portela Gravadora (in a duet with Monarco) and Terreiro Gravadora in 1980 as well as Cristina, de Cristina Buarque (participação) in 1981, Histórias do céu e da terra infantil in 1984 and Doce recordação - Velha-Guarda da Portela in 1986 over the course of the decade. Doca released Homenagem a Paulo da Portela in 1990 followed by Resgate, de Cristina Buarque four years later, then Cilico Amigos = Parceria in 1995 and Velhas companheiras with the music group Velha Guarda da Mangueira in 1999.

She participated along with some of the artists in she worked with for the album Pagode da Tia Doca which was released in 2000. That same year, Doca released Casa de Samba 4, Doce recordação with the Velha Guarda da Portela and Tudo azul Selo Phonomotor all on CD. She participated on the albums Casquinha da Portela, A Música de Paulinho da Viola, Deixa a vida me levar, de Zeca Pagodinho and Um ser de luz - saudação à Clara Nunes over the following three years. Doca was also a featured artist on the 2003 re-release of the compilation album O Canto dos Escravos. She was a participant on the 2005 album À vera and Cidade do Samba two years later. In 2008, Doca was in the Marisa Monte-produced documentary O Mistério do Samba. She also authored the sambas Temporal and Orgulho Negro as a composer, the latter of which was performed by Jovelina Pérola Negra.

== Personal life ==
Her husband was Altair Costa, and the couple had three children. On 17 January 2009, Doca had a stroke and was transported to the intensive care unit of Hospital Municipal Carlos Chagas, in Rio's Marechal Hermes neighbourhood. She was later taken to Hospital Central do Iaserj, where she died eight days later. Doca's funeral was held before approximately 100 people at the Cemitério de Irajá on the afternoon of 26 January.

== See also ==
- List of dancers
