= Mark Britton =

American businessman

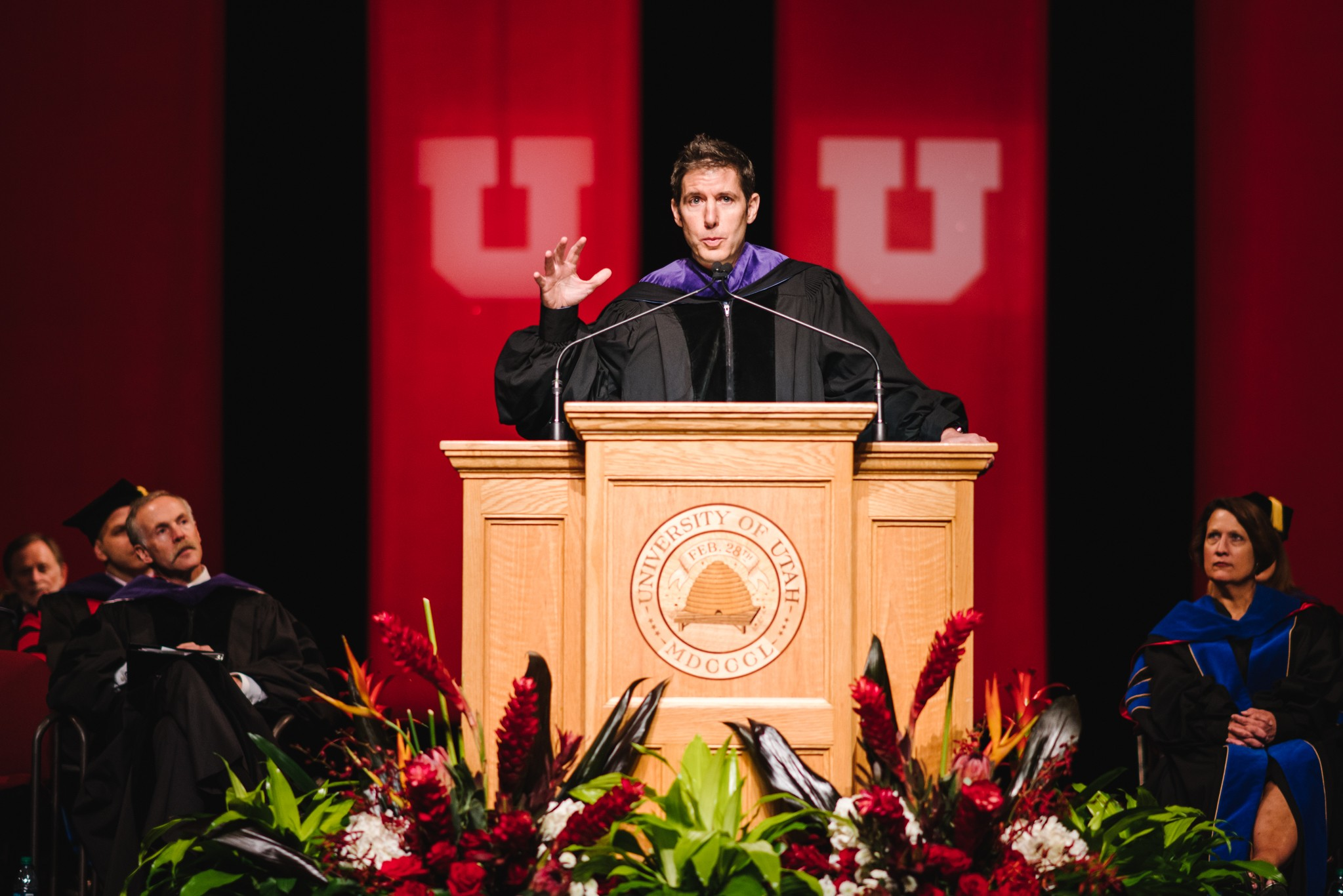
- Britton giving commencement address at University of Utah Law School (2017)
- Born: February 1967 (age 59); Butte, Montana, USA
- Occupation: Entrepreneur
- Known for: Founder of Avvo

Mark Britton (born February 21, 1967) is a former lawyer and Expedia executive and founder of the legal marketplace Avvo.com.

In 2015, Mark won the Ernst & Young Entrepreneur of the Year Award for the Pacific Northwest. Mark was also identified as one of three upcoming Seattle "Tech Titans 2.0" by Puget Sound Business Journal in 2012 and as one of Seattle's Top 25 Innovators by Seattle Business Magazine in 2007. Upon his retirement from Avvo in 2018, Above the Law called him "the person who most disrupted law this decade."

Mark is a long-standing member of the Gonzaga University Board of Regents and served on the Board of Directors of Orbitz Worldwide from 2011 until Expedia purchased Orbitz in September 2015. Mark was named one of the American Bar Association's inaugural Legal Rebels in 2009.

== Early life and education ==
Britton was born in Butte, Montana and attended high school in Missoula, Montana. He graduated from Gonzaga University in 1989 with a degree in Finance and graduated from George Washington University Law School in 1992. He attended Gonzaga's program in Florence, Italy during the 1987/1988 academic year and returned to teach there during the 2004/2005 academic year.
