= Marcus Hamilton (American football) =

American football player (born 1984)

No. 24, 32, 37, 23
- Position: Cornerback

Personal information
- Born: February 17, 1984 (age 42); Fairfax, Virginia, U.S.
- Listed height: 5 ft 11 in (1.80 m)
- Listed weight: 188 lb (85 kg)

Career information
- High school: Centreville (Clifton, Virginia)
- College: Virginia
- NFL draft: 2007: 7th round, 245th overall pick

Career history
- Tampa Bay Buccaneers (2007–2008); Chicago Bears (2008); Tampa Bay Buccaneers (2009); Las Vegas Locomotives (2009)

Awards and highlights
- UFL champion (2009); 2× Second-team All-ACC (2005, 2006)

Career NFL statistics
- Total tackles: 7
- Pass deflections: 2
- Stats at Pro Football Reference

Marcus Christopher David Hamilton (born February 17, 1984) is an American former professional football player who was a cornerback in the National Football League (NFL). He was selected by the Tampa Bay Buccaneers in the seventh round of the 2007 NFL draft. He played college football for the Virginia Cavaliers.

Hamilton was also a member of the Chicago Bears and Las Vegas Locomotives.

== Early life ==
Marcus Hamilton played high school football at Centreville High School in Clifton, Virginia.

Marcus's father Greg was a teacher and high school football coach in the Fairfax County Public Schools system.

== Professional career ==
=== Tampa Bay Buccaneers (first stint) ===
Hamilton was promoted to the active roster on September 19, 2008 after cornerback Elbert Mack was suspended. Hamilton made his professional debut on September 21, 2008 as the Tampa Bay Buccaneers beat the Chicago Bears. The Buccaneers waived him on September 22.

=== Chicago Bears ===
Hamilton failed to clear waivers and was claimed by the Chicago Bears on September 23. An exclusive-rights free agent in the 2009 offseason, Hamilton signed his one-year tender offer on March 12, 2009. He was informed of his release on September 5, 2009.

=== Tampa Bay Buccaneers (second stint) ===
Hamilton re-signed with the Buccaneers on September 23, 2009. He was waived on October 5.
