= So You Think You Can Dance (American TV series) season 5 =

So You Think You Can Dance
- Season 5
- Hosted by: Cat Deeley
- Judges: Nigel Lythgoe; Mary Murphy
- Winner: Jeanine Mason
- Runner-up: Brandon Bryant
- Finals venue: Kodak Theatre

Release
- Original network: Fox
- Original release: May 21 – August 6, 2009

Season chronology
- ← Previous; Season 4 Next → Season 6

So You Think You Can Dance is a United States television reality program and dance competition airing on the Fox Broadcasting Company network. Season five premiered on May 21, 2009, with Nigel Lythgoe and Mary Murphy returning as permanent judges and Cat Deeley returning to host. Jeanine Mason was crowned America's Favorite Dancer on August 6, 2009, making her the second female to win the show. For the first time, the show moved to a new stage, but it turned out to be the last season at CBS Studios.

== Auditions ==
Open auditions for this season were held in the following locations:

Audition Venue	City	Date	Guest Judge(s)
Mark Morris Dance Center	Brooklyn, New York	November 13, 2008	Tabitha and Napoleon D'umo
Adrienne Arsht Center for the Performing Arts	Miami, Florida	February 3, 2009	Tyce Diorio
Orpheum Theatre	Los Angeles, California	February 12, 2009	Adam Shankman
Paramount Theatre	Denver, Colorado	March 12, 2009	Sonya Tayeh
The Cadre Building	Memphis, Tennessee	March 16, 2009	Lil' C
The Moore Theatre	Seattle, Washington	March 28, 2009	Mia Michaels

=== Las Vegas week ===
Judges: Nigel Lythgoe, Mary Murphy, Mia Michaels, Lil' C, Adam Shankman, Debbie Allen.

The Las Vegas callbacks were held at Planet Hollywood Resort and Casino in Las Vegas, Nevada. 172 contestants were invited to participate in the callback auditions. This number was cut to 32 contestants (each gender: 16 female and 16 male), before the announcement of the season's top 20 contestants. Las Vegas week included the following rounds, with cuts made after each:

Contestant(s)	Thing/style	Music	Choreographer(s)
All (individual)	Solo	Individual songs chosen by contestant	The contestant
All	Hip-hop	"Boom Boom Pow"—The Black Eyed Peas	Tabitha D'umo; Napoleon D'umo
All	Waltz	"May It Be"—Enya	Jean-Marc Généreux; France Mousseau
All	Jazz	"Great DJ (Calvin Harris Remix)"—The Ting Tings	Sonya Tayeh
All (in groups)	Group choreography	Individual songs picked by the group	The group
All	Contemporary	"Belief (Stripped Version)"—Gavin DeGraw	Mia Michaels
Female contestants	Broadway	"America" from West Side Story	Tyce Diorio
Male contestants	Broadway	"Cool" from West Side Story	Tyce Diorio
All (individual)	Solo	Individual songs chosen by contestant	The contestant

== Top 20 Contestants ==
=== Female Contestants ===
Contestant	Age	Home Town	Dance Style	Elimination date	Placement
Jeanine Mason	18	Miami, Florida	Contemporary/Jazz	August 6, 2009	Winner
Kayla Radomski	18	Aurora, Colorado	Contemporary	August 6, 2009	4th Place
Melissa Sandvig	29	Los Angeles, California	Ballet	July 30, 2009	Top 6
Janette Manrara	25	Miami, Florida	Salsa	July 23, 2009	Top 8
Randi Evans	23	Orem, Utah	Jazz	July 16, 2009	Top 10
Caitlin Kinney	21	Annapolis, Maryland	Contemporary	July 9, 2009	Top 12
Karla Garcia	23	Brooklyn, New York	Contemporary	July 2, 2009	Top 14
Asuka Kondoh	25	San Francisco, California	Latin Ballroom	June 25, 2009	Top 16
Ashley Valerio	22	Mesa, Arizona	Contemporary	June 18, 2009	Top 18
Paris Torres	19	Issaquah, Washington	Contemporary	June 11, 2009	Top 20

=== Male Contestants ===
Contestant	Age	Home Town	Dance Style	Elimination date	Placement
Brandon Bryant	20	Miami, Florida	Contemporary	August 6, 2009	Runner Up
Evan Kasprzak	21	Benzonia, Michigan	Broadway	August 6, 2009	3rd Place
Ade Obayomi	20	Peoria, Arizona	Contemporary	July 30, 2009	Top 6
Jason Glover	21	Fresno, California	Contemporary	July 23, 2009	Top 8
Kupono Aweau	23	Kailua, Hawaii	Lyrical Jazz	July 16, 2009	Top 10
Phillip Chbeeb	20	Houston, Texas	Popping	July 9, 2009	Top 12
Vitolio Jeune	26	Miami, Florida (originally from Haiti)	Contemporary	July 2, 2009	Top 14
Jonathan Platero	21	Tampa, Florida	Salsa	June 25, 2009	Top 16
Maksim Kapitannikov	26	Brooklyn, New York	Latin Ballroom	June 18, 2009	Top 18
Tony Bellissimo	20	Buffalo, New York	Hip Hop	June 11, 2009	Top 20

=== Elimination chart ===
Contestants are listed in reverse chronological order of elimination. The song for the eliminated female contestants was "Already Gone" by Kelly Clarkson. The song for the eliminated male contestants was "On Your Own" by Green River Ordinance.

Legend
Female	Male	Bottom 3 couples	Bottom 4 contestants

Week:	6/11	6/18	6/25	7/2	7/9	7/16	7/23	7/30	8/6
Contestant	Result								
Jeanine Mason				Btm 3	Btm 3				Winner
Brandon Bryant							Btm 4		Runner-Up
Evan Kasprzak									3rd place
Kayla Radomski		Btm 3		Btm 3			Btm 4		4th place
Ade Obayomi					Btm 3	Btm 4		Elim	
Melissa Sandvig					Btm 3	Btm 4		Elim	
Jason Glover		Btm 3	Btm 3		Btm 3		Elim		
Janette Manrara							Elim		
Kūpono Aweau		Btm 3		Btm 3		Elim			
Randi Evans						Elim			
Philip Chbeeb				Btm 3	Elim				
Caitlin Kinney		Btm 3	Btm 3		Elim				
Vitolio Jeune	Btm 3		Btm 3	Elim					
Karla Garcia	Btm 3		Btm 3	Elim					
Jonathan Platero	Btm 3		Elim						
Asuka Kondoh	Btm 3		Elim						
Maksim "Max" Kapitannikov		Elim							
Ashley Valerio		Elim							
Tony Bellissimo	Elim								
Paris Torres	Elim								

=== Performances ===
==== Week 1 (June 10, 2009) ====
Judges: Nigel Lythgoe, Mary Murphy, Adam Shankman

- Couple dances:

Couple	Style	Music	Choreographer(s)	Results
Jeanine Mason; Phillip Chbeeb	Lyrical hip-hop	"Mad"—Ne-Yo	Tabitha D'umo; Napoleon D'umo	Safe
Asuka Kondoh; Vitolio Jeune	Broadway	"Hot Honey Rag" from Chicago	Tyce Diorio	Bottom 3
Karla Garcia; Jonathan Platero	Cha-cha	"Poker Face"—Lady Gaga	Tony Meredith	Bottom 3
Randi Evans; Evan Kasprzak	Jazz	"I Only Have Eyes for You"—Jamie Cullum	Tyce Diorio	Safe
Paris Torres; Tony Bellissimo	Hip-hop	"Let the Beat Rock" (Boyz Noize Megamix)—The Black Eyed Peas	Tabitha D'umo; Napoleon D'umo	Both eliminated
Caitlin Kinney; Jason Glover	Bollywood	"Jai Ho" from Slumdog Millionaire	Nakul Dev Mahajan	Safe
Janette Manrara; Brandon Bryant	Foxtrot	"Come Fly with Me"—Michael Bublé	Louis van Amstel	Safe
Ashley Valerio; Kūpono Aweau	Jazz	"Felt Mountain"—Goldfrapp	Wade Robson	Safe
Melissa Sandvig; Ade Obayomi	Contemporary	"Right Here Waiting"—Richard Marx	Mandy Moore	Safe
Kayla Radomski; Maksim "Max" Kapitannikov	Samba	"Jum Bah Day"—House of Gypsies	Louis van Amstel	Safe

==== Week 2 (June 17, 2009) ====
Judges: Nigel Lythgoe, Mary Murphy, Lil' C

- Couple dances:

Couple	Style	Music	Choreographer(s)	Results
Randi Evans; Evan Kasprzak	Jive	"Shake A Tail Feather"—Ray Charles	Louis van Amstel	Safe
Melissa Sandvig; Ade Obayomi	Jazz	"24 Hours" (The Aston Shuffle A-Bomb Remix)—Terry Poison	Sonya Tayeh	Safe
Caitlin Kinney; Jason Glover	Hip-hop	"Missin' You"—Trey Songz	Shane Sparks	Bottom 3
Janette Manrara; Brandon Bryant	Disco	"Loving Is Really My Game"—Brainstorm	Doriana Sanchez	Safe
Asuka Kondoh; Vitolio Jeune	Waltz	"Dreams Are More Precious"—Enya	Louis van Amstel	Safe
Kayla Radomski; Maksim "Max" Kapitannikov	Pop-Jazz	"Hot Like Wow"—Nadia Oh	Brian Friedman	Kapitannikov Eliminated
Karla Garcia; Jonathan Platero	Contemporary	"Falling Slowly"—The Frames	Stacey Tookey	Safe
Jeanine Mason; Phillip Chbeeb	Tango	"Violento (Up Mix)"—Bailongo!	Tony Meredith	Safe
Ashley Valerio; Kūpono Aweau	Hip-hop	"Imma Be"—The Black Eyed Peas	Shane Sparks	Valerio Eliminated

==== Week 3 (June 24, 2009) ====
Judges: Nigel Lythgoe, Mary Murphy, Toni Basil

- Couple dances:

Couple	Style	Music	Choreographer(s)	Results
Karla Garcia; Jonathan Platero	Hip-hop	"By My Side"—Jadakiss featuring Ne-Yo	Dave Scott	Platero Eliminated
Asuka Kondoh; Vitolio Jeune	Jazz	"Heartbreaker"—Pat Benatar	Mandy Moore	Kondoh Eliminated
Melissa Sandvig; Ade Obayomi	Rumba	"Emotion"—Destiny's Child	Tony Meredith	Safe
Janette Manrara; Brandon Bryant	Hip-hop	"What a World"—Common	Dave Scott	Safe
Kayla Radomski; Kūpono Aweau	Viennese Waltz	"Sweet Dreams for You"—Jewel	Jean-Marc Généreux; France Mousseau	Safe
Randi Evans; Evan Kasprzak	Contemporary	"Koop Island Blues"—Koop featuring Ane Brun	Mia Michaels	Safe
Caitlin Kinney; Jason Glover	Paso Doble	"O Fortuna"—Mozarteum Orchester Salzburg & Kurt Pretsel	Jean-Marc Généreux; France Mousseau	Bottom 3
Jeanine Mason; Phillip Chbeeb	Broadway	"Moses Supposes" from Singin' in the Rain	Tyce Diorio	Safe

==== Week 4 (July 1, 2009) ====
Judges: Nigel Lythgoe, Mary Murphy, Mia Michaels

- Couple dances:

Couple	Style	Music	Choreographer(s)	Results
Janette Manrara; Brandon Bryant	Cha-cha	"Hush Hush; Hush Hush"—The Pussycat Dolls	Jean-Marc Généreux; France Mousseau	Safe
Kayla Radomski; Kūpono Aweau	Contemporary	"Eyes On Fire"—Blue Foundation	Sonya Tayeh	Bottom 3
Randi Evans; Evan Kasprzak	Broadway	"Rich Man's Frug" from Sweet Charity	Joey Dowling	Safe
Caitlin Kinney; Jason Glover	Pop-Jazz	"Creator"—Santigold	Brian Friedman	Safe
Jeanine Mason; Phillip Chbeeb	Hip-hop	"Love Lockdown"—Kanye West	Tabitha D'umo; Napoleon D'umo	Bottom 3
Melissa Sandvig; Ade Obayomi	Classical Pas de deux	"Romeo and Juliet: Prokofiev's Suite (No.1 Op 64b, 6th Movement)" —Orchestre De La Suisse Romande & Armin Jordan	Thordal Christensen	Safe
Karla Garcia; Vitolio Jeune	Quickstep	"Puttin' on the Ritz"—Rufus Wainwright	Jean-Marc Généreux; France Mousseau	Both eliminated

==== Week 5 (July 8, 2009) ====
Judges: Nigel Lythgoe, Mary Murphy, Tyce Diorio

- Couple dances:

Couple	Style	Music	Choreographer(s)	Results
Melissa Sandvig; Ade Obayomi	Disco	"Move On Up"—Destination	Doriana Sanchez	Bottom 3
Melissa Sandvig; Ade Obayomi	Waltz	"(You Make Me Feel Like) A Natural Woman"—Mary J. Blige	Ron Montez	Bottom 3
Kayla Radomski; Kūpono Aweau	Contemporary	"Gravity"—Sara Bareilles	Mia Michaels	Safe
Kayla Radomski; Kūpono Aweau	Broadway	"The Dance At the Gym" from West Side Story	Joey Dowling	Safe
Caitlin Kinney; Jason Glover	Foxtrot	"Minnie the Moocher"—Big Bad Voodoo Daddy	Tony Meredith; Melanie LaPatin	Kinney eliminated
Caitlin Kinney; Jason Glover	Lyrical Jazz	"Show Me Heaven"—Maria McKee	Mandy Moore	Kinney eliminated
Jeanine Mason; Phillip Chbeeb	Kalinka	"Kalinka"—Barynya	Youri Nelzine; Lilia Babenko	Chbeeb eliminated
Jeanine Mason; Phillip Chbeeb	Jive	"Stuff Like That There"—Bette Midler	Tony Meredith; Melanie LaPatin	Chbeeb eliminated
Randi Evans; Evan Kasprzak	Lyrical hip-hop	"Halo"—Beyoncé Knowles	Tabitha D'umo; Napoleon D'umo	Safe
Randi Evans; Evan Kasprzak	Samba	"Ritmo De Bom Bom"—Jubaba	Anya Garnis; Pasha Kovalev (Season 3)	Safe
Janette Manrara; Brandon Bryant	Argentine Tango	"Libertango" from Forever Tango	Miriam Larici; Leonardo Barrionuevo	Safe
Janette Manrara; Brandon Bryant	Jazz	"Ruby Blue"—Róisín Murphy	Wade Robson	Safe

==== Week 6 (July 15, 2009) ====
Judges: Nigel Lythgoe, Mary Murphy, Debbie Allen

- Group dances:

Contestant	Style	Music	Choreographer(s)
Top 5 female contestants	Bollywood	"Dholna" from Pyaar Ke Geet	Nakul Dev Mahajan
Top 5 male contestants	African Jazz	"Balant Funk"—Ayanda Clark and Shawn Kelly	Jeffrey Paige

- Couple dances:

Couple	Style	Music	Choreographer(s)	Results
Kayla Radomski; Evan Kasprzak	Viennese Waltz	"Kiss from a Rose"—Seal	Tony Meredith; Melanie LaPatin	Safe
Janette Manrara; Ade Obayomi	Hip hop	"Love Sex Magic"—Ciara featuring Justin Timberlake	Tabitha D'umo; Napoleon D'umo	Obayomi in bottom 4
Jeanine Mason; Jason Glover	Contemporary	"If It Kills Me" (The Casa Nova Sessions)—Jason Mraz	Travis Wall (Season 2)	Safe
Randi Evans; Kūpono Aweau	Paso Doble	"Dies Irae"—Karl Jenkins	Tony Meredith; Melanie LaPatin	Both eliminated
Melissa Sandvig; Brandon Bryant	Broadway	"Aquarius" from Hair	Tyce Diorio	Sandvig in bottom 4

- Top 10 contestant's solos:

Contestant	Style	Music	Result
Brandon Bryant	Contemporary	"In Your Eyes"—Jeffrey Gaines	Safe
Randi Evans	Contemporary	"Dream"—Priscilla Ahn	Eliminated
Kupono Aweau	Jazz	"Marina Gasolina"—Bonde do Rolê	Eliminated
Melissa Sandvig	Ballet	"Gabriel"—Lamb	Bottom 4
Evan Kasprzak	Broadway	"Zing! Went the Strings of My Heart"—Rufus Wainright	Safe
Kayla Radomski	Contemporary	"Rock Your Soul"—Elisa	Safe
Ade Obayomi	Contemporary	"Unchained Melody"—The Righteous Brothers	Bottom 4
Jeanine Mason	Jazz	"Violento (Up Mix)"—Bailongo!	Safe
Jason Glover	Broadway	"Train Fare Home"—Muddy Waters	Safe
Janette Manrara	Salsa	"This is Miami"—Sander Kleinenberg	Safe

==== Week 7 (July 22, 2009) ====
Judges: Nigel Lythgoe, Ellen DeGeneres, Mary Murphy, Mia Michaels

- Group dance: Top 8: "Let It Rock"—Kevin Rudolf featuring Lil Wayne (Pop-Jazz; Choreographer: Travis Wall)
- Couple dances:

Couple	Style	Music	Choreographer(s)	Results
Janette Manrara; Evan Kasprzak	Jazz	"Move" (Metronomy Remix)—CSS	Sonya Tayeh	Manrara eliminated
Janette Manrara; Evan Kasprzak	Rumba	"Heartless"—Kris Allen	Tony Meredith; Melanie LaPatin	Manrara eliminated
Jeanine Mason; Brandon Bryant	Smooth Waltz	"May It Be"—Hayley Westenra	Hunter Johnson	Bryant in Bottom 4
Jeanine Mason; Brandon Bryant	Pop-Jazz	"Battlefield"—Jordin Sparks	Laurie Ann Gibson	Bryant in Bottom 4
Melissa Sandvig; Ade Obayomi	Cha-cha	"Yeah (Como Goza Mi Morena)"—Chino Espinoza y Los Dueños Del Son	Tony Meredith; Melanie LaPatin	Safe
Melissa Sandvig; Ade Obayomi	Contemporary	"This Woman's Work"—Maxwell	Tyce Diorio	Safe
Kayla Radomski; Jason Glover	Broadway	"Mr. Monotony"—Kim Criswell	Tyce Diorio	Glover eliminated Radomski in bottom 4
Kayla Radomski; Jason Glover	Hip-hop	"They're Everywhere"—Izza Kizza	Shane Sparks	Glover eliminated Radomski in bottom 4

- Top 8 contestant's solos:

Contestant	Style	Music	Result
Kayla Radomski	Contemporary	"The Moment I Said It"—Imogen Heap	Bottom 4
Jason Glover	Contemporary	"...Slowdance on the Inside"—Taking Back Sunday	Eliminated
Janette Manrara	Rumba	"Seduces Me"—Celine Dion	Eliminated
Ade Obayomi	Jazz	"Hater"—Various	Safe
Melissa Sandvig	Ballet	"Heads Will Roll"—Yeah Yeah Yeahs	Safe
Evan Kasprzak	Broadway	"Old Devil Moon"—Jamie Cullum	Safe
Jeanine Mason	Contemporary	"Let the Drummer Kick"—Citizen Cope	Safe
Brandon Bryant	Jazz	"Ain't Nothing Wrong With That"—Robert Randolph and the Family Band	Bottom 4

==== Week 8 (July 29, 2009) ====
Judges: Nigel Lythgoe, Mary Murphy, Lil' C

- Group dances:

Contestants	Style	Music	Choreographer(s)
Top 3 male contestants	Jazz	"True Romance"—She Wants Revenge	Sonya Tayeh
Top 3 female contestants	Jazz	"Kick It (Stereoheroes Remix)"—Nina Martine	Sonya Tayeh

- Couple dances:

Couple	Style	Music	Choreographer(s)	Results
Jeanine Mason; Ade Obayomi	Samba	"LoveGame"—Lady Gaga	Louis van Amstel	Obayomi eliminated
Jeanine Mason; Ade Obayomi	Hip-hop	"Move (If You Wanna)"—Mims	Tabitha D'umo; Napoleon D'umo	Obayomi eliminated
Melissa Sandvig; Evan Kasprzak	Broadway	"Get Me to the Church on Time"—Matt Dusk	Tyce Diorio	Sandvig eliminated
Melissa Sandvig; Evan Kasprzak	Quickstep	"As Long As I'm Singin'"—Brian Setzer Orchestra	Louis van Amstel	Sandvig eliminated
Kayla Radomski; Brandon Bryant	Contemporary	"All I Want"—Ahn Trio	Stacey Tookey	Safe
Kayla Radomski; Brandon Bryant	Disco	"Dance (Disco Heat)"—Sylvester	Doriana Sanchez	Safe

Top 6 contestant's solos:

Contestant	Style	Music	Result
Kayla Radomski	Contemporary	"You Found Me"—The Fray	Safe
Ade Obayomi	Contemporary	"18th Floor Balcony"—Blue October	Eliminated
Melissa Sandvig	Ballet	"I Put A Spell On You"—Nina Simone	Eliminated
Brandon Bryant	Modern	"O Fortuna"—Mozarteum Orchester Salzburg & Kurt Pretsel	Safe
Jeanine Mason	Jazz	"Feedback"—Janet Jackson	Safe
Evan Kasprzak	Broadway	"The Lady Is a Tramp"—Sammy Davis Jr.	Safe

==== Week 9 (August 5, 2009) ====
Judges: Nigel Lythgoe, Mary Murphy, Adam Shankman

- Group dance: Top 4: "Boys Boys Boys"—Lady Gaga (Pop-Jazz; Choreographer: Wade Robson)
- Duo dances:

Couple	Style	Music	Choreographer(s)
Jeanine Mason; Evan Kasprzak	Jazz	"Heartbreaker"—MSTRKRFT featuring John Legend	Sonya Tayeh
Kayla Radomski; Brandon Bryant	Broadway	"Bye Bye Love" from All That Jazz	Tyce Diorio
Brandon Bryant; Evan Kasprzak	Pop-Jazz	"Nasty"—Janet Jackson	Laurie Ann Gibson
Jeanine Mason; Kayla Radomski	Contemporary	"The Four Sections: IV (Full Orchestra)"—Steve Reich	Mia Michaels
Kayla Radomski; Evan Kasprzak	Jive	"T.R.O.U.B.L.E."—Travis Tritt	Tony Meredith; Melanie LaPatin
Jeanine Mason; Brandon Bryant	Paso Doble	"Tetsujin" from The Matrix Revolutions	Louis van Amstel

Top 4 contestant's solos:

Contestant	Style	Music
Brandon Bryant	Contemporary	"Dies Irae"—Karl Jenkins
Jeanine Mason	Jazz	"Por una Cabeza"—The Tango Project
Evan Kasprzak	Broadway	"The Best Is Yet to Come"—Michael Bublé
Kayla Radomski	Jazz	"Sweet Dreams (Are Made of This)"—Eurythmics

=== Results shows ===
==== Week 1 (June 11, 2009) ====
- Group dance: Top 20: "Boom Boom Pow"—The Black Eyed Peas (Hip-hop; Choreographer: Shane Sparks)
- Musical guest: "Fire Burning"—Sean Kingston
- Guest dancers: Miriam Larici and Leonardo Barrionuevo: "Tangueira" from Forever Tango (Argentine Tango)
- Solos:

Contestant	Style	Music	Result
Paris Torres	Contemporary	"It Doesn't Hurt"—Katie Thompson	Eliminated
Tony Bellissimo	Locking	"Early in the Morning"—The Gap Band	Eliminated
Asuka Kondoh	Jive	"Did Ya"—BoA	Safe
Vitolio Jeune	Contemporary	"We Belong Together"—Gavin DeGraw	Safe
Karla Garcia	Contemporary	"(You Make Me Feel Like) A Natural Woman"—Aretha Franklin	Safe
Jonathan Platero	Salsa	"Krazy"—Pitbull featuring Lil Jon	Safe

- Eliminated:
  - Paris Torres
  - Tony Bellissimo
- New Pairs:
  - None

==== Week 2 (June 18, 2009) ====
- Group dance: Top 18: "Higher Ground"—Stevie Wonder (Contemporary; Choreographer: Mia Michaels)
- Musical guest: "Goodbye"—Kristinia DeBarge
- Guest dancer: Amrapali Ambegaokar: "Ganesh Toda Tankar"—Guru Sundarlal Gangani & Smt. Anjani Ambegoakar (Kathak)
- Solos:

Contestant	Style	Music	Result
Caitlin Kinney	Contemporary	"Make You Feel My Love"—Adele	Safe
Jason Glover	Contemporary	"Superman"—Robin Thicke	Safe
Ashley Valerio	Jazz	"By Your Side"—Coco Rosie	Eliminated
Kūpono Aweau	Jazz	"Many Moons"—Janelle Monáe	Safe
Kayla Radomski	Contemporary	"Walking on Air"—Kerli	Safe
Maksim "Max" Kapitannikov	Jive	"Footloose"—Kenny Loggins	Eliminated

- Eliminated:
  - Ashley Valerio
  - Maksim "Max" Kapitannikov
- New Pairs:
  - Kayla Radomski and Kūpono Aweau

==== Week 3 (June 25, 2009) ====
- Group dance: Top 16: "I Know You Want Me (Calle Ocho)"—Pitbull (Hip-hop/Samba; Choreographers: Dmitry Chaplin, Napoleon and Tabitha D'umo)
- Musical guest: "Take Me on the Floor"—The Veronicas
- Guest dancers: The Rage Boyz Crew: "Feel It"—Colby O'Donis & Mauli-b (Hip-Hop; Choreographer: Tiffany Burton)
- Solos:

Contestant	Style	Music	Result
Asuka Kondoh	Cha-cha	"Don't Trust Me"—3OH!3	Eliminated
Vitolio Jeune	Contemporary	"Viva La Vida"—Coldplay	Safe
Karla Garcia	Jazz	"15 Step"—Radiohead	Safe
Jonathan Platero	Salsa	"The Hunted"—Kodo	Eliminated
Caitlin Kinney	Contemporary	"Que Sera Sera"—Jennifer Terran	Safe
Jason Glover	Contemporary	"New American Classic"—Taking Back Sunday	Safe

- Eliminated:
  - Asuka Kondoh
  - Jonathan Platero
- New Pairs:
  - Karla Garcia and Vitolio Jeune

==== Week 4 (July 2, 2009) ====
- Group dance: Top 14: "A Brand New Day" from The Wiz (Broadway; Choreographer: Tyce Diorio)
- Musical guest: "I Do Not Hook Up"—Kelly Clarkson
- Guest dancers: Desmond Richardson and Patricia Hachey: "Caprice in E Minor, Op. 1 No 3"—Midori (Contemporary Ballet; Choreographers: Dwight Rhoden and Desmond Richardson)
- Solos:

Contestant	Style	Music	Result
Karla Garcia	Contemporary	"Blackbird"—Dionne Farris	Eliminated
Vitolio Jeune	Contemporary	"Here Comes Goodbye"—Rascal Flatts	Eliminated
Kayla Radomski	Contemporary	"Stupid"—Sarah McLachlan	Safe
Kūpono Aweau	Jazz	"Somewhere Over the Rainbow"—Israel Kamakawiwo'ole	Safe
Jeanine Mason	Contemporary	"Moonlight Sonata"—Smart Sleep With Classical	Safe
Phillip Chbeeb	Popping	"You'll Find A Way (Switch & Greame Sinden Remix)"—Santigold	Safe

- Eliminated:
  - Karla Garcia
  - Vitolio Jeune
- New Pairs:
  - None

==== Week 5 (July 9, 2009) ====
- Group dance: Top 12: "Seven Nation Army"—The White Stripes (Hip-hop; Choreographers: Napoleon and Tabitha D'umo)
- Musical guests: "When Love Takes Over"—David Guetta and Kelly Rowland
- Solos:

Contestant	Style	Music	Result
Caitlin Kinney	Contemporary	"Stand By Me"—Playing for Change	Eliminated
Jason Glover	Contemporary	"Calm Touching"—Evaline	Safe
Jeanine Mason	Contemporary	"Baby's Romance"—Chris Garneau	Safe
Phillip Chbeeb	Popping	"The Diva Dance" from The Fifth Element—Sarah Brightman	Eliminated
Melissa Sandvig	Ballet	"Kashira"—Kodo	Safe
Ade Obayomi	Jazz	"Windowdipper"—Jib Kidder	Safe

- Eliminated:
  - Caitlin Kinney
  - Phillip Chbeeb
- New Pairs:

- None. Now that only ten contestants remaining, new pairs are randomly assigned each week. They'll also be voted individually.

==== Week 6 (July 16, 2009) ====
Judges: only Debbie Allen and Mary Murphy

- Note: This season contestants are performing the same solos at the results shows as in the performance show
- Group dance: Top 10: "So Much Betta"—Janet Jackson (Jazz; Choreographers: Wade and Amanda Robson)
- Musical guest: "I Gotta Feeling"—The Black Eyed Peas
- Bottom 4:
  - Kūpono Aweau
  - Randi Evans
  - Ade Obayomi
  - Melissa Sandvig
- Eliminated:

- Randi Evans
- Kūpono Aweau

==== Week 7 (July 23, 2009) ====
Judges: Nigel Lythgoe, Mary Murphy, Mia Michaels

- Note: This was the 100th episode of SYTYCD
- Group dance: Top 8: "One" from A Chorus Line (Contemporary; Choreographer: Mia Michaels)
- Musical guest: "Get Happy"—Katie Holmes
  - The performance was not performed on stage but pre-taped for promoting Dizzy Feet Foundation.
- Guest dancers:

- The three winners of the Primetime Emmy Award for Outstanding Choreography were reenacted by their respective original dancers:

Year won	Former contestants	Style	Music	Choreographer(s)
2008	Jaimie Goodwin; Hokuto Konishi	Jazz	"The Chairman's Waltz" from Memoirs of a Geisha	Wade Robson
2007	Heidi Groskreutz; Travis Wall	Contemporary	"Calling You"—Celine Dion	Mia Michaels
2007	Top 10^{1} Wade Robson	Pop-Jazz group dance	"Ramalama (Bang Bang)"—Róisín Murphy	Wade Robson

- Bottom 4:
  - Brandon Bryant
  - Jason Glover
  - Janette Manrara
  - Kayla Radomski
- Eliminated:

- Janette Manrara
- Jason Glover

^1 Natalie Fotopoulos and Ryan Rankine were absent, however, the season two top ten contestants were joined by their choreographers, Wade Robson.

==== Week 8 (July 30, 2009) ====
- Group dance: Top 6: "Send in the Clowns"—Judy Collins (Broadway; Choreographer: Tyce Diorio)
- Musical guest: "So Fine"—Sean Paul
- Guest dancers:

- JabbaWockeeZ: "Freak-A-Zoid"—Midnight Star (Hip-Hop)
- The four nominees for the 2009 Primetime Emmy Award for Outstanding Choreography were reenacted by their respective original dancers:

Season 4 contestants	Style	Music	Choreographer(s)	Result
Jessica King; William Wingfield	Contemporary	"Silence" from Unfaithful	Tyce Diorio	Won
Katee Shean; Stephen "Twitch" Boss	Contemporary	"Mercy"—Duffy	Mia Michaels	Nominated
Chelsie Hightower; Joshua Allen	Argentine Tango	"A Los Amigos" from Forever Tango	Dmitry Chaplin	Nominated
Chelsie Hightower; Mark Kanemura	Lyrical hip-hop	"Bleeding Love"—Leona Lewis	Tabitha and Napoleon D'umo	Nominated

- Contestants that performed a solo again for the top 4 votes:
  - Evan Kasprzak
  - Ade Obayomi
  - Kayla Radomski
  - Melissa Sandvig
- Eliminated:

- Melissa Sandvig
- Ade Obayomi

==== Week 9 (Finale) (August 6, 2009) ====
Judges: Nigel Lythgoe, Mary Murphy, Adam Shankman, Debbie Allen, Tyce Diorio, Lil' C, Mia Michaels

- Group dances:

Contestants	Style	Music	Choreographer(s)
Top 20^{1}	Broadway	"Brand New Day" from The Wiz	Tyce Diorio
Top 20^{2}	Hip-Hop/Samba	"I Know You Want Me (Calle Ocho)"—Pitbull	Tabitha and Napoleon D'umo; Dmitry Chaplin
Top 8 All judges this episode except Lil' C	Contemporary	"One" from A Chorus Line	Mia Michaels

- Guest dancers:

Dancer(s)	Style	Music	Choreographer(s)
Talia Fowler^{3}	Jazz	"Shot You Down"—Audio Bullys	Sonya Tayeh
The Rage Boyz Crew	Hip-Hop	"Feel It"—Colby O'Donis & Mauli-b	Tiffany Burton

^1 The routine was originally performed by the top 14 contestants ^2 The routine was originally performed by the top 16 contestants.
^3 Talia Fowler is the winner of So You Think You Can Dance Australia's second season, and this performance comprised a portion of her prize package.

===== Judges' picks =====
Couple	Style	Music	Choreographer(s)	Chosen by
Jeanine Mason; Phillip Chbeeb	Lyrical hip-hop	"Mad"—Ne-Yo	Tabitha D'umo; Napoleon D'umo	Adam Shankman
Janette Manrara; Brandon Bryant	Argentine tango	"Libertango" from Forever Tango	Miriam Larici; Leonardo Barrionuevo	Nigel Lythgoe
Asuka Kondoh; Vitolio Jeune	Waltz	"Dreams Are More Precious"—Enya	Louis van Amstel	Debbie Allen
Jeanine Mason; Jason Glover	Contemporary	"If It Kills Me" (The Casa Nova Sessions)—Jason Mraz	Travis Wall	Mary Murphy
Kayla Radomski; Maksim "Max" Kapitannikov	Samba	"Jum Buh Day"—House of Gypsies	Louis van Amstel	Mia Michaels
Caitlin Kinney; Jason Glover	Bollywood	"Jai Ho" from Slumdog Millionaire	Nakul Dev Mahajan	Lil' C
Randi Evans; Evan Kasprzak	Contemporary	"Koop Island Blues"—Koop featuring Ane Brun	Mia Michaels	Adam Shankman
Jeanine Mason; Brandon Bryant	Paso Doble	"Tetsujin" from The Matrix Revolutions	Louis van Amstel	Mary Murphy
Kayla Radomski; Küpono Aweau	Contemporary	"Gravity"—Sara Bareilles	Mia Michaels	Nigel Lythgoe
Janette Manrara; Brandon Bryant	Disco	"Loving Is Really My Game"—Brainstorm	Doriana Sanchez	Tyce Diorio
Melissa Sandvig; Ade Obayomi	Contemporary	"This Woman's Work"—Maxwell	Tyce Diorio	Mia Michaels

- 4th Place

- Kayla Radomski

- 3rd Place

- Evan Kasprzak

- Runner-Up:

- Brandon Bryant

- Winner

- Jeanine Mason

== Controversy ==
On May 21, 2009, SYTYCD aired two males performing ballroom dance together for the first time, with dancers Misha and Mitchel performing a Samba. The dance couple's introduction on the show, and the judges' subsequent comments, have been criticized as homophobic. The two men were introduced with The Weather Girls' "It's Raining Men" played in the background. After the couple performed, judge Nigel Lythgoe said, "I think you'd probably alienate a lot of our audience. We've always had the guys dance together on the show but they've never really done it in each other's arms before. I'm really one of those people that like to see guys be guys and girls be girls on stage. I don't think I liked it, to be frank." He later went on to say that he'd like each man to dance with women and that: "You never know, you might enjoy that, too." The segment closed, and the song "It's a Man's Man's Man's World" is played in the background, which contains the lyrics: "This is a man's world, but it wouldn't be nothing, nothing without a woman or a girl." Cat Deeley went on to say that the pair were "out."

Lythgoe issued a formal apology letter later that week, stating that he regretted "poor word choices" and that he realized how his comments could be "misconstrued." He went on to say that he "believe[s] the sexual orientation of an auditioner or contestant is irrelevant... the fact that I have unintentionally upset people is distressing to me... I have made mistakes that I must learn from."

== Tour ==
So You Think You Can Dance went on tour through 40 cities across the US and 1 city in Canada, Toronto. Nigel had also announced that Caitlin Kinney and Phillip Chbeeb would also be going on the tour as swing contestants since they made it to the top 12 before being cut.

== Ratings ==
=== U.S. Nielsen ratings ===
Show	Episode	First air date	Rating (18–49)	Share (18–49)	Viewers (millions)	Rank (timeslot)	Rank (night)
1	Season Premiere, Part 1	May 21, 2009	5.3	9	8.8	1	2
2	Season Premiere, Part 2	May 27, 2009	5.3	9	8.7	2	3
3	Episode 505/506	May 28, 2009	5.5	9	9.2	2	4
4	Vegas Callbacks #1	June 3, 2009	5.4	9	8.9	1	4
5	Vegas Callbacks #2 (Top 20 Chosen)	June 4, 2009	5.1	9	8.2	3	4
6	Top 20 Perform	June 10, 2009	5.3	9	8.7	1	3
7	2 of 20 Voted Off	June 11, 2009	5.3	9	8.6	3	4
8	Top 18 Perform	June 17, 2009	5.3	9	8.5	1	1 (tied)
9	2 of 18 Voted Off	June 18, 2009	4.9	9	8.0	2	4
10	Top 16 Perform	June 24, 2009	4.7	8	7.6	1	4
11	2 of 16 Voted Off	June 25, 2009	4.2	7	6.9	2	5
12	Top 14 Perform	July 1, 2009	4.6	8	7.7	1	4
13	2 of 14 Voted Off	July 2, 2009	4.4	8	7.2	2	3
14	Top 12 Perform	July 8, 2009	4.7	8	7.6	1	4
15	2 of 12 Voted Off	July 9, 2009	4.9	8	7.9	2	3
16	Top 10 Perform	July 15, 2009	4.4	8	7.0	1	4
17	2 of 10 Voted Off	July 16, 2009	4.6	8	7.2	2	3
18	Top 8 Perform	July 22, 2009	N/A	N/A	7.4	N/A	N/A
19	2 of 8 Voted Off	July 23, 2009	5.1	9	8.4	1	2
20	Top 6 Perform	July 29, 2009	4.7	8	N/A	1	2
21	2 of 6 Voted Off	July 30, 2009	4.7	8	N/A	2	3
22	Top 4 Perform	August 5, 2009	4.8	9	7.8	1	3
23	Winner Announced	August 6, 2009	5.7	10	9.6	1	1

== See also ==
- List of So You Think You Can Dance finalists
