= Kanemura =

Kanemura (written: 金村) is a Japanese surname. Notable people with the surname include:

- Kintaro Kanemura (金村 珩皓; born 1970), Zainichi-Korean wrestler
- Mark Kanemura (マーク・カネムラ; born 1983), American dancer
- Miku Kanemura (金村 美玖; born 2002), Japanese singer, model, actress
- Osamu Kanemura (金村 修; born 1964), Japanese photographer
- Satoru Kanemura (金村 曉; born 1976), Japanese baseball player and coach
- Shōma Kanemura (金村 尚真; born 2000), Japanese baseball player
