= So You Think You Can Dance (American TV series) season 4 =

So You Think You Can Dance
- Season 4
- Hosted by: Cat Deeley
- Judges: Nigel Lythgoe; Mary Murphy
- Winner: Joshua Allen
- Runner-up: Stephen "tWitch" Boss

Release
- Original network: Fox
- Original release: May 22 – August 7, 2008

Season chronology
- ← Previous; Season 3 Next → Season 5

So You Think You Can Dance is a United States television reality program and dance competition airing on the Fox Broadcasting Company network. Season four premiered on May 22, 2008, with Nigel Lythgoe and Mary Murphy returning as permanent judges and Cat Deeley returning to host. Joshua Allen was announced as the winner on August 7, 2008, the first hip-hop contestant to win the title coming first place. Allen and fellow grand finalist Katee Shean, who were paired as a couple from the first performance episode, became the seventh contestants in the show's run never to face elimination from being among the bottom six or bottom four contestants, became the fifth contestants to be in the grand finale, and became the second pair in the show's run never to face elimination from being among the bottom six or bottom four contestants in the grand finale.

== Auditions ==
Open auditions for this season were expanded to the following six cities:

| Audition Venue | City | Date | Guest Judges(s) |
|---|---|---|---|
| McFarlin Memorial Auditorium | Dallas, Texas | January 17–19, 2008 | Adam Shankman |
| Charleston Music Hall | Charleston, South Carolina | January 31–February 2, 2008 | Tyce Diorio |
| Capitol Theatre | Salt Lake City, Utah | February 4–7, 2008 | Mandy Moore |
| Atlas Performing Arts Center | Washington, D.C. | February 21–23, 2008 | Dan Karaty |
| Orpheum Theatre | Los Angeles, California | March 6–8, 2008 | Mia Michaels |
| The Milwaukee Theatre | Milwaukee, Wisconsin | March 20–22, 2008 | Tabitha and Napoleon D'umo |

For the first time, New York City was not a stop on the audition tour. To be able to audition, contestants had to be between the ages of 18 and 30 and able to be legally employed in the United States. Partner auditions were allowed.

=== Las Vegas week ===
| Contestant(s) | Thing/style | Music | Choreographer(s) |
|---|---|---|---|
| All | Hip-hop | "Shawty Get Loose"—Lil Mama featuring T-Pain and Chris Brown | Tabitha D'umo; Napoleon D'umo |
| All | Broadway | "This Joint is Jumping" from Ain't Misbehavin' | Tyce Diorio |
| All | Foxtrot | "Call Me Irresponsible"—Michael Bublé | Jean-Marc Généreux; France Mousseau |
| All (in groups) | Group choreography | Individual songs picked by the group | The group |
| All | Contemporary | "Mic Check"—Imogen Heap | Mia Michaels |
| All (individual) | Solo | Individual songs chosen by contestant | The contestant |

Over 200 contestants who impressed the judges in the initial auditions each received a plane ticket to a challenging week of callback auditions at the Planet Hollywood Resort and Casino in Las Vegas, Nevada. The week consisted of multiple rounds of choreography, with dancers cut from the competition every round. This season, the rounds included a hip-hop routine with Napoleon D'umo and Tabitha D'umo, a Broadway number with Tyce Diorio, the foxtrot with Jean-Marc Généreux, group choreography, contemporary choreography with Mia Michaels, and a final solo for the remaining contestants. Nigel Lythgoe and Mary Murphy were part of the judging panel for the week, along with Debbie Allen, Mia Michaels, Napoleon D'umo and Tabitha D'umo.

== Studio Shows ==
=== Format ===
As in seasons 2 and 3, the studio shows began with 20 contestants, ten female and ten male. After pairs are assigned, couples pick a dance style out of a hat, are rehearsed by a choreographer, and perform their routine. Following the airing of the performances, home viewers vote for their favorite couple. The bottom three couples (six contestants overall) are then liable for elimination by the judges on the live, or broadcast on Broadcast delay in the western United States, results show. All six contestants perform a solo, after which the judges eliminate one female contestant and one male contestant. If the eliminated contestants are not from the same couple, their respective pairs form a new pair for the following week's performances. Once the field of contestants is narrowed down to the top 10, permanent partnerships dissolve and contestants draw their new partners from a hat each week. The judges no longer have any say in the elimination process; viewers call in to vote for their favorite individual contestant, and the female contestant and the male contestant with the lowest number of votes are eliminated each week.

Because of the inclusion of performer William Wingfield into the top 20 contestants, Debbie Allen was ruled ineligible to perform duties as a Guest Judge during the Live Shows phase, as long as Wingfield remained in the competition. Wingfield is a Contemporary contestant from Nashville, Tennessee who trained under Allen at the Debbie Allen Dance Academy. He was sent home from the competition on July 24, 2008. Because of Wingfield being eliminated, Debbie Allen was technically able to guest judge for the top six episode semi-finals, but Adam Shankman was the guest judge instead.

=== Top 20 Contestants ===
==== Female Contestants ====
| Contestant | Age | Home Town | Dance Style | Elimination date | Placement |
|---|---|---|---|---|---|
| Katee Shean | 19 | San Jose, California | Contemporary | August 7, 2008 | 3rd Place |
| Courtney Galiano | 19 | Commack, New York | Contemporary | August 7, 2008 | 4th Place |
| Chelsie Hightower | 18 | Pleasant Grove, Utah | Latin Ballroom | July 31, 2008 | Top 6 |
| Comfort Fedoke | 19 | Dallas, Texas | Hip Hop | July 24, 2008 | Top 8 |
| Kherington Payne | 18 | Placentia, California | Contemporary | July 17, 2008 | Top 10 |
| Jessica King | 24 | Myrtle Beach, South Carolina | Contemporary | July 10, 2008 (Withdrew Due To Injury) | Top 12 |
| Kourtni Lind | 18 | Forest Lake, Minnesota | Contemporary | July 3, 2008 | Top 14 |
| Chelsea Traille | 23 | Baytown, Texas | Contemporary | June 26, 2008 | Top 16 |
| Susie Garcia | 24 | Miami, Florida | Salsa | June 20, 2008 | Top 18 |
| Rayven Armijo | 28 | Los Angeles, California | Ballet | June 12, 2008 | Top 20 |

==== Male Contestants ====
| Contestant | Age | Home Town | Dance Style | Elimination date | Placement |
|---|---|---|---|---|---|
| Joshua Allen † | 18 | Fort Worth, Texas | Hip Hop | August 7, 2008 | Winner |
| Stephen "tWitch" Boss † | 25 | Montgomery, Alabama | Popping/Locking | August 7, 2008 | Runner Up |
| Mark Kanemura | 24 | Honolulu, Hawaii | Jazz | July 31, 2008 | Top 6 |
| Will Wingfield | 21 | Nashville, Tennessee | Contemporary | July 24, 2008 | Top 8 |
| Gevorg "Gev" Manoukian | 22 | Salt Lake City, Utah | Breakdance | July 17, 2008 | Top 10 |
| Thayne Jasperson | 27 | Provo, Utah | Contemporary | July 10, 2008 | Top 12 |
| Matt Dorame | 24 | Glendale, Arizona | Contemporary | July 3, 2008 | Top 14 |
| Chris Jarosz | 22 | Galestown, Maryland | Contemporary | June 26, 2008 | Top 16 |
| Marquis Cunningham | 18 | Ocala, Florida | Contemporary | June 20, 2008 | Top 18 |
| Jamie Bayard | 22 | Palmdale, California | Swing | June 12, 2008 | Top 20 |

==== Elimination chart ====
The song played for the females and males varied throughout the season. Every week, a different song was played. Contestants are in alphabetical order by last name, then in reverse chronological order of elimination.

Legend
| Female | Male | Bottom 3 couples | Bottom 4 contestants |

| Week: | 6/12 | 6/19 | 6/26 | 7/03 | 7/10 | 7/17 | 7/24 | 7/31 | 8/07 |
| Contestant | Result | | | | | | | | |
| Joshua Allen | | | | | | | | | Winner |
| Stephen "tWitch" Boss | | | | | Btm 3 | | Btm 4 | | Runner-Up |
| Katee Shean | | | | | | | | | 3rd Place^{2} |
| Courtney Galiano | | | | Btm 3 | | | Btm 4 | | 4th Place |
| Mark Kanemura | | | | | | Btm 4 | | Elim | |
| Chelsie Hightower | | | | | | | | Elim | |
| William Wingfield | Btm 3 | | | | Btm 3 | | Elim | | |
| Comfort Fedoke | | Btm 3 | Btm 3 | Btm 3 | Elim* | Btm 4 | Elim | | |
| Gev Manoukian | | | | Btm 3 | | Elim | | | |
| Kherington Payne | | | | | Btm 3 | Elim | | | |
| Jessica King | Btm 3 | | | | Btm 3 | WD^{1} | | | |
| Thayne Jasperson | | Btm 3 | Btm 3 | Btm 3 | Elim | | | | |
| Matt Dorame | Btm 3 | | Btm 3 | Elim | | | | | |
| Kourtni Lind | Btm 3 | | Btm 3 | Elim | | | | | |
| Chris Jarosz | | Btm 3 | Elim | | | | | | |
| Chelsea Traille | | Btm 3 | Elim | | | | | | |
| Marquis Cunningham | | Elim | | | | | | | |
| Susie Garcia | | Elim | | | | | | | |
| Jamie Bayard | Elim | | | | | | | | |
| Rayven Armijo | Elim | | | | | | | | |

^{1}Jessica King suffered an injury that resulted in her being unable to continue in the competition. She was medically withdrawn, and Comfort Fedoke replaced her as she was the most recent female competitor eliminated.
^{2}Katee Shean was awarded $50,000 for being America's favorite female contestant.

=== Performances ===
==== Week 1 (June 11, 2008) ====
Judges: Nigel Lythgoe, Mary Murphy, Dan Karaty

- Couple dances:

| Couple | Style | Music | Choreographer(s) | Result(s) |
|---|---|---|---|---|
| Rayven Armijo; Jamie Bayard | Hip-Hop | "American Boy"—Estelle feat. Kanye West | Tabitha and Napoleon D'umo | Both eliminated |
| Susie Garcia; Marquis Cunningham | Waltz | "Dark Waltz"—Hayley Westenra | Hunter Johnson | Safe |
| Kourtni Lind; Matt Dorame | Jazz | "Tainted Love"—Soft Cell | Mandy Moore | Bottom 3 |
| Chelsea Traille; Thayne Jasperson | Cha-cha | "Oye Como Va (Latin/Trance Mix)"—Celia Cruz | Tony Meredith; Melanie LaPatin assisting | Safe |
| Chelsie Hightower; Mark Kanemura | Contemporary | "Beautiful"—Meshell Ndegeocello | Mia Michaels | Safe |
| Kherington Payne; Stephen "tWitch" Boss | Broadway | "Too Darn Hot" from Kiss Me, Kate | Tyce Diorio | Safe |
| Comfort Fedoke; Chris Jarosz | Jive | "Boom Boom"—Big Head Todd and the Monsters | Tony Meredith; Melanie LaPatin assisting | Safe |
| Katee Shean; Joshua Allen | Lyrical hip-hop | "No Air"—Jordin Sparks & Chris Brown | Tabitha and Napoleon D'umo | Safe |
| Jessica King; William Wingfield | Tango | "Tango"—Cirque du Soleil | Hunter Johnson | Bottom 3 |
| Courtney Galiano; Gev Manoukian | Disco | "Boogie Wonderland"—Earth, Wind & Fire feat. The Emotions | Doriana Sanchez | Safe |

==== Week 2 (June 18, 2008) ====
Judges: Nigel Lythgoe, Mary Murphy, Mia Michaels

- Couple dances:

| Couple | Style | Music | Choreographer(s) | Result(s) |
|---|---|---|---|---|
| Chelsea Traille; Thayne Jasperson | Jazz | "Untouched"—The Veronicas | Mandy Moore | Bottom 3 |
| Chelsie Hightower; Mark Kanemura | Argentine Tango | "Mi Confesión"—Gotan Project | Alex Da Silva | Safe |
| Jessica King; William Wingfield | Hip-Hop | "Whatever U Like"—Nicole Scherzinger | Olisa Thompson; Cicely Bradley | Safe |
| Kourtni Lind; Matt Dorame | Foxtrot | "A Foggy Day (In London Town)"—Michael Bublé | Jean-Marc Généreux; France Mousseau assisting | Safe |
| Courtney Galiano; Gev Manoukian | Contemporary | "Lost"—Anouk | Mandy Moore | Safe |
| Katee Shean; Joshua Allen | Broadway | "All for the Best" from Godspell | Tyce Diorio | Safe |
| Susie Garcia; Marquis Cunningham | Salsa | "Aguanilé"—Willie Colón and Héctor Lavoe | Alex Da Silva | Both eliminated |
| Kherington Payne; Stephen "tWitch" Boss | Viennese Waltz | "A New Day Has Come"—Celine Dion | Jean-Marc Généreux; France Mousseau assisting | Safe |
| Comfort Fedoke; Chris Jarosz | Krump | "Come and Get Me" —Timbaland featuring 50 Cent & Tony Yayo | Lil' C | Bottom 3 |

==== Week 3 (June 25, 2008) ====
Judges: Nigel Lythgoe, Mary Murphy, Adam Shankman

- Couple dances:

| Couple | Style | Music | Choreographer(s) | Result(s) |
|---|---|---|---|---|
| Kherington Payne; Stephen "tWitch" Boss | Hip-Hop | "Don't Touch Me (Throw da Water on 'Em)"—Busta Rhymes | Tabitha and Napoleon D'umo | Safe |
| Courtney Galiano; Gev Manoukian | Rumba | "Wishing on a Star"—Rose Royce | Tony Meredith; Melanie LaPatin assisting | Safe |
| Comfort Fedoke; Chris Jarosz | Afro Jazz | "The Beautiful People"—Marilyn Manson | Tyce Diorio | Jarosz eliminated |
| Jessica King; William Wingfield | Disco | "Heaven Must Have Sent You"—Bonnie Pointer | Doriana Sanchez | Safe |
| Kourtni Lind; Matt Dorame | Contemporary | "Wrestlers (Sticky, Dirty Pop Mix)"—Hot Chip | Sonya Tayeh | Bottom 3 |
| Chelsea Traille; Thayne Jasperson | Quickstep | "You Can't Hurry Love"—Phil Collins | Heather Smith | Traille eliminated |
| Chelsie Hightower; Mark Kanemura | Lyrical hip-hop | "Bleeding Love"—Leona Lewis | Tabitha and Napoleon D'umo | Safe |
| Katee Shean; Joshua Allen | Samba | "Baila, Baila"—Angela Via | Tony Meredith; Melanie LaPatin assisting | Safe |

==== Week 4 (July 2, 2008) ====
Judges: Nigel Lythgoe, Mary Murphy, Tabitha and Napoleon D'umo

- Couple dances:

| Couple | Style | Music | Choreographer(s) | Results |
|---|---|---|---|---|
| Jessica King; William Wingfield | Jive | "Choo Choo Ch' Boogie" from Five Guys Named Moe | Tony Meredith; Melanie LaPatin assisting | Safe |
| Jessica King; William Wingfield | Lyrical Jazz | "Alone"—Heart | Mandy Moore | Safe |
| Comfort Fedoke; Thayne Jasperson | Broadway | "Cool" from West Side Story | Andy Blankenbuehler | Bottom 3 |
| Comfort Fedoke; Thayne Jasperson | Smooth Waltz | "Hov Arek Sarer Jan"—New Age Armenia | Edward Simon | Bottom 3 |
| Kourtni Lind; Matt Dorame | Hip-Hop | "How Do I Breathe"—Mario | Olisa Thompson; Cicely Bradley | Both eliminated |
| Kourtni Lind; Matt Dorame | Mambo | "Ban Con Tim"—Super All-Star | Alex Da Silva | Both eliminated |
| Chelsie Hightower; Mark Kanemura | Jazz | "Kiss Kiss"—Holly Valance (incorrectly listed as "Holly Vance") | Mandy Moore | Safe |
| Chelsie Hightower; Mark Kanemura | Foxtrot | "It's My Life"—Paul Anka | Edward Simon | Safe |
| Kherington Payne; Stephen "tWitch" Boss | Paso Doble | "Malagueña"—Brian Setzer '68 Comeback Special | Tony Meredith; Melanie LaPatin assisting | Safe |
| Kherington Payne; Stephen "tWitch" Boss | Contemporary | "Dreaming With a Broken Heart"—John Mayer | Mia Michaels | Safe |
| Katee Shean; Joshua Allen | Contemporary | "Hometown Glory"—Adele | Mia Michaels | Safe |
| Katee Shean; Joshua Allen | West Coast Swing | "Shake It"—Brother Yusef | Benji Schwimmer (season 2); Lacey Schwimmer (season 3) assisting | Safe |
| Courtney Galiano; Gev Manoukian | Hip-Hop | "Lights, Camera, Action!"—Mr. Cheeks | Olisa Thompson; Cicely Bradley | Bottom 3 |
| Courtney Galiano; Gev Manoukian | Broadway | "New York, New York" from On the Town | Andy Blankenbuehler | Bottom 3 |

==== Week 5 (July 9, 2008) ====
Judges: Nigel Lythgoe, Mary Murphy, Mia Michaels

- Couple dances:

| Couple | Style | Music | Choreographer(s) | Results |
|---|---|---|---|---|
| Chelsie Hightower; Mark Kanemura | Salsa | "Fuego"—Joe Bataan | Alex Da Silva | Safe |
| Chelsie Hightower; Mark Kanemura | Broadway | "I'm a Woman" from Smokey Joe's Cafe | Tyce Diorio | Safe |
| Comfort Fedoke; Thayne Jasperson | Hip-Hop | "Can We Chill"—Ne-Yo | Tabitha and Napoleon D'umo | Both eliminated* |
| Comfort Fedoke; Thayne Jasperson | Contemporary | "A Different Corner"—George Michael | Mandy Moore | Both eliminated* |
| Jessica King; William Wingfield | Contemporary | "Silence" from Unfaithful | Tyce Diorio | Bottom 3 King withdrawn* |
| Jessica King; William Wingfield | Quickstep | "Bandstand Boogie"—Barry Manilow | Tony Meredith; Melanie LaPatin assisting | Bottom 3 King withdrawn* |
| Courtney Galiano; Gev Manoukian | Cha-cha | "Don't Stop the Music (The Wideboys Club Mix)"—Rihanna | Anya Garnis (season 3); Pasha Kovalev (season 3) | Safe |
| Courtney Galiano; Gev Manoukian | Jazz | "Standing There"—The Creatures aka singer Siouxsie Sioux | Mandy Moore | Safe |
| Kherington Payne; Stephen "tWitch" Boss | Krump | "2 Buck 4 TV"—Tha J-Squad | Lil' C | Bottom 3 |
| Kherington Payne; Stephen "tWitch" Boss | Tango | "Assassin's Tango" from Mr. and Mrs. Smith | Jean-Marc Généreux; France Mousseau assisting | Bottom 3 |
| Katee Shean; Joshua Allen | Viennese Waltz | "Iris"—Goo Goo Dolls | Jean-Marc Généreux; France Mousseau assisting | Safe |
| Katee Shean; Joshua Allen | Bollywood | "Dhoom Taana" from Om Shanti Om | Nakul Dev Mahajan | Safe |

* Comfort Fedoke and Thayne Jasperson were eliminated by the judges, but Jessica King later had to withdraw from the competition due to injury. She was replaced by Fedoke, the most recent eliminated female.

==== Week 6 (July 16, 2008) ====
Judges: Nigel Lythgoe, Mary Murphy, Lil' C

- Couple dances:

| Couple | Style | Music | Choreographer(s) | Results |
|---|---|---|---|---|
| Courtney Galiano; Joshua Allen | Hip-Hop | "Skippin'"—Mario | Dave Scott | Safe |
| Courtney Galiano; Joshua Allen | Rumba | "Hero"—Enrique Iglesias | Jean-Marc Généreux; France Mousseau | Safe |
| Kherington Payne; Mark Kanemura | Country-western two-step | "Kick Back"—Ty England | Ronnie DeBenedetta; Brandi Tobais | Payne eliminated Kanemura in bottom 4 |
| Kherington Payne; Mark Kanemura | Jazz | "Canned Heat"—Jamiroquai | Tyce Diorio | Payne eliminated Kanemura in bottom 4 |
| Comfort Fedoke; Stephen "tWitch" Boss | Smooth Waltz | "Open Arms"—Journey | Hunter Johnson | Fedoke in bottom 4 |
| Comfort Fedoke; Stephen "tWitch" Boss | Hip-Hop | "Forever"—Chris Brown | Dave Scott | Fedoke in bottom 4 |
| Katee Shean; William Wingfield | Broadway | "Sit Down You're Rocking the Boat"—Sam Harris | Tyce Diorio | Safe |
| Katee Shean; William Wingfield | Pas de deux | "Imagine"—David Archuleta | Dwight Rhoden; Desmond Richardson | Safe |
| Chelsie Hightower; Gev Manoukian | Contemporary | "These Arms of Mine"—Otis Redding | Sonya Tayeh | Manoukian eliminated |
| Chelsie Hightower; Gev Manoukian | Jive | "The House is Rockin'"—Brian Setzer | Jean-Marc Généreux; France Mousseau assisting | Manoukian eliminated |

- Top 10 contestant’s solos:

| Contestant | Style | Music | Result |
|---|---|---|---|
| Chelsie Hightower | Samba | "Pon de Replay"—Rihanna | Safe |
| Gev Manoukian | Breakdance | "Hello Goodbye (Uncool)"—Lupe Fiasco feat. Unkle | Eliminated |
| Courtney Galiano | Contemporary | "I Want You to Need Me"—Celine Dion | Safe |
| Mark Kanemura | Pop-Jazz | "Bohemian Rhapsody"—Queen | Bottom 4 |
| Comfort Fedoke | Hip-Hop | "Need a Boss"—Shareefa feat. Ludacris | Bottom 4 |
| Stephen "tWitch" Boss | Hip-Hop | "I Question Mark"—Wade Robson | Safe |
| Katee Shean | Contemporary | "This Woman's Work" (MTV Unplugged)—Maxwell | Safe |
| William Wingfield | Contemporary | "Dance With My Father"—Luther Vandross | Safe |
| Kherington Payne | Jazz | "Breakin' Dishes"—Rihanna | Eliminated |
| Joshua Allen | Hip-Hop | "Jam"—Michael Jackson | Safe |

==== Week 7 (July 23, 2008) ====
Judges: Nigel Lythgoe, Mary Murphy, Toni Basil

- Couple dances:

| Couple | Style | Music | Choreographer(s) | Results |
|---|---|---|---|---|
| Courtney Galiano; William Wingfield | Samba | "I Fell in Love with the DJ"—Che'Nelle featuring Cham | Jean-Marc Généreux; France Mousseau assisting | Galiano in Bottom 4 Wingfield eliminated |
| Courtney Galiano; William Wingfield | Lyrical hip-hop | "Like You'll Never See Me Again"—Alicia Keys | Tabitha and Napoleon D'umo | Galiano in Bottom 4 Wingfield eliminated |
| Katee Shean; Stephen "tWitch" Boss | Contemporary | "Mercy"—Duffy | Mia Michaels | Boss in bottom 4 |
| Katee Shean; Stephen "tWitch" Boss | Broadway | "Sweet Georgia Brown" from Bubbling Brown Sugar | Tyce Diorio | Boss in bottom 4 |
| Comfort Fedoke; Mark Kanemura | Hip-Hop | "Party People"—Nelly feat. Fergie | Tabitha and Napoleon D'umo | Fedoke eliminated |
| Comfort Fedoke; Mark Kanemura | Foxtrot | "Lady Luck"—The Brian Setzer Orchestra | Jean-Marc Généreux; France Mousseau assisting | Fedoke eliminated |
| Chelsie Hightower; Joshua Allen | Argentine Tango | "A Los Amigos" from Forever Tango | Dmitry Chaplin (season 2) | Safe |
| Chelsie Hightower; Joshua Allen | Disco | "Everlasting Love"—Gloria Estefan | Doriana Sanchez | Safe |

- Top 8 contestant’s solos:

| Contestant | Style | Music | Result |
|---|---|---|---|
| Comfort Fedoke | Hip-Hop | "I Got This Down"—Simian Mobile Disco | Eliminated |
| William Wingfield | Funk | "Get Up Offa That Thing"—James Brown | Eliminated |
| Katee Shean | Contemporary | "Taking Chances"—Celine Dion | Safe |
| Mark Kanemura | Pop-Jazz | "Creator"—Santigold feat. Switch and Freq Nasty | Safe |
| Chelsie Hightower | Cha-cha | "Damaged"—Danity Kane | Safe |
| Joshua Allen | Hip-Hop | "Shawty Get Loose"—Lil Mama feat. T-Pain & Chris Brown | Safe |
| Courtney Galiano | Contemporary | "Where I Stood"—Missy Higgins | Bottom 4 |
| Stephen "tWitch" Boss | Hip-Hop | "Go To Work"—Kay L | Bottom 4 |

==== Week 8 (July 30, 2008) ====
Judges: Nigel Lythgoe, Mary Murphy, Adam Shankman

- Couple dances:

| Couple | Style | Music | Choreographer(s) | Results |
|---|---|---|---|---|
| Courtney Galiano; Mark Kanemura | Viennese Waltz | "The Time of My Life"—David Cook | Jason Gilkison | Kanemura eliminated |
| Courtney Galiano; Mark Kanemura | Jazz | "The Garden"—Mirah | Sonya Tayeh | Kanemura eliminated |
| Katee Shean; Joshua Allen | Contemporary | "All by Myself"—Celine Dion | Tyce Diorio | Safe |
| Katee Shean; Joshua Allen | Paso Doble | "Filet" from Le Rêve | Jason Gilkison | Safe |
| Chelsie Hightower; Stephen "tWitch" Boss | Mambo | "Ahora Me Toca a Mi"—Víctor Manuelle | Tony Meredith; Melanie LaPatin assisting | Hightower eliminated |
| Chelsie Hightower; Stephen "tWitch" Boss | Hip-Hop | "Control"—Vitamin String Quartet | Tabitha and Napoleon D'umo | Hightower eliminated |

- Top 6 contestant’s solos:

| Contestant | Style | Music | Result |
|---|---|---|---|
| Chelsie Hightower | Cha-cha | "When I Grow Up"—Pussycat Dolls | Eliminated |
| Stephen "tWitch" Boss | Funk | "Midas Touch"—Midnight Star | Safe |
| Katee Shean | Contemporary | "Can't Stop"—Maroon 5 | Safe |
| Joshua Allen | Hip-Hop | "Like That"—Memphis Bleek | Safe |
| Courtney Galiano | Contemporary | "Rock Your Soul"—Elisa | Safe |
| Mark Kanemura | Pop-Jazz | "Bum Like You"—Robyn | Eliminated |

==== Week 9 (August 6, 2008) ====
Judges: Nigel Lythgoe, Mary Murphy, Mandy Moore

- Group dance: Top 4: "Hallelujah"—The Vitamin String Quartet (Contemporary:

Choreographer: Mia Michaels)

- Couple dances:

| Couple | Style | Music | Choreographer(s) |
|---|---|---|---|
| Courtney Galiano; Stephen "tWitch" Boss | Hip-Hop | "Church"—T-Pain | Tabitha and Napoleon D'umo |
| Katee Shean; Joshua Allen | Lyrical Jazz | "Slow Dancing In A Burning Room"—John Mayer | Wade Robson |
| Courtney Galiano; Katee Shean | Broadway | "The Trolley Song"—Rufus Wainwright | Tyce Diorio |
| Joshua Allen; Stephen "tWitch" Boss | Trepak | "Trepak" from Tchaikovsky's The Nutcracker | Youri Nelzine |
| Katee Shean; Stephen "tWitch" Boss | Foxtrot | "Feeling Good"—Michael Bublé | Tony Meredith; Melanie LaPatin assisting |
| Courtney Galiano; Joshua Allen | Jive | "The Dirty Boogie"—The Brian Setzer Orchestra | Jason Gilkison |

- Top 4 contestant’s solos:

| Contestant | Style | Music |
|---|---|---|
| Courtney Galiano | Contemporary | "They Weren't There"—Missy Higgins |
| Stephen "tWitch" Boss | Hip-Hop | "It Was All In Your Mind"—Wade Robson |
| Katee Shean | Contemporary | "Hide and Seek"—Imogen Heap |
| Joshua Allen | Hip-Hop | "(Not Just) Knee Deep"—Funkadelic |

=== Results shows ===
==== Week 1 (June 12, 2008) ====
- Group dance: Top 20 and Nigel Lythgoe: "Cobrastyle"—Robyn (Pop-jazz; Choreographer: Wade Robson)
- Guest dancer(s): Popin' Pete and Shonn Boog: "I Can Make You Dance" – Zapp (Popping)
- Musical guest: "When I Grow Up" – Pussycat Dolls
- Solos:

| Contestant | Style | Music | Result |
|---|---|---|---|
| Kourtni Lind | Contemporary | "I Wanna Dance With Somebody"—The Side Project | Safe |
| Matt Dorame | Contemporary | "Baby's Romance"—Chris Garneau | Safe |
| Rayven Armijo | Ballet | "As I Am (Intro)"—Alicia Keys | Eliminated |
| Jamie Bayard | Samba | "Mas Que Nada" – Sérgio Mendes feat. The Black Eyed Peas | Eliminated |
| Jessica King | Contemporary | "Misery Business (Acoustic)"—Paramore | Safe |
| William Wingfield | Contemporary | "More Than Anyone (Stripped version)"—Gavin DeGraw | Safe |

- Eliminated
  - Rayven Armijo: "It's Only Life"—Kate Voegele
  - Jamie Bayard: "Best Days (Here Comes the Rest of Our Lives)"—Graham Colton
- New Pairs:
  - None

==== Week 2 (June 19, 2008) ====
- Group dance: Top 18: "Elevator"—Flo Rida feat. Timbaland (Hip-Hop; Choreographer: Shane Sparks)
- Guest dancer(s): Timo Nuñez (auditioned for season 1 and season 2, making it to Las Vegas week both times)
- Musical guest: "In the Ayer"—Flo Rida featuring will.i.am
- Solos:

| Contestant | Style | Music | Result |
|---|---|---|---|
| Chelsea Traille | Jazz | "The Time Is Now"—Moloko | Safe |
| Thayne Jasperson | Contemporary | "Belief"—Gavin DeGraw | Safe |
| Susie Garcia | Salsa | "The Anthem"—Pitbull feat. Lil Jon | Eliminated |
| Marquis Cunningham | Contemporary | "Stop and Stare"—OneRepublic | Eliminated |
| Comfort Fedoke | Hip-Hop | "Planet Rock"—Afrika Bambaataa | Safe |
| Chris Jarosz | Contemporary | "Again"—John Legend | Safe |

- Eliminated:
  - Susie Garcia: "Brave"—Idina Menzel
  - Marquis Cunningham: "Wonderful World"—James Morrison
- New Pairs:
  - None

==== Week 3 (June 26, 2008) ====
- Group dance: Top 16: "The Dance"—Charlotte Martin (Contemporary; Choreographer: Mia Michaels)
- Guest dancer(s): Quest Crew: "Chemical Calisthenics"—Blackalicious feat. Cut Chemist (Breakdance)
- Musical guest: "One Step at a Time"—Jordin Sparks
- Solos:

| Contestant | Style | Music | Result |
|---|---|---|---|
| Chelsea Traille | Contemporary | "A Song For You"—Donny Hathaway | Eliminated |
| Thayne Jasperson | Contemporary | "Always"—Bon Jovi | Safe |
| Comfort Fedoke | Hip-Hop | "Just Fine"—Mary J. Blige | Safe |
| Chris Jarosz | Contemporary | "After Tonight"—Justin Nozuka | Eliminated |
| Kourtni Lind | Jazz | "Fire Door (Live)"—Ani DiFranco | Safe |
| Matt Dorame | Contemporary | "I'm Yours"—Jason Mraz | Safe |

- Eliminated:
  - Chelsea Traille: "When You're Gone"—Avril Lavigne
  - Chris Jarosz: "All We Are"—OneRepublic
- New Pairs:
  - Comfort Fedoke and Thayne Jasperson

==== Week 4 (July 3, 2008) ====
- Group dance: Top 14: "Money Money" from Cabaret (Broadway; Choreographer: Tyce Diorio)
- Guest dancer(s): Robert Muraine: "Gonna Make You Sweat"—C+C Music Factory (Popping)
- Musical guest: "Say (All I Need)"—OneRepublic
- Solos:

| Contestant | Style | Music | Result |
|---|---|---|---|
| Kourtni Lind | Contemporary | "No Man"—Nina Storey | Eliminated |
| Matt Dorame | Contemporary | "Sweet Contentment"—Bradley James and the Roadies | Eliminated |
| Courtney Galiano | Jazz | "What's Another Day"—Maria Mena | Safe |
| Gev Manoukian | Breakdance | "Everybody Loves a Carnival"—Fatboy Slim | Safe |
| Comfort Fedoke | Hip-Hop | "Hit the Floor"—Twista feat. Pitbull | Safe |
| Thayne Jasperson | Contemporary | "I Want To Break Free"—Queen | Safe |

- Eliminated:

- Kourtni Lind: "Incredible"—Clique Girlz
- Matt Dorame: "Might As Well Have a Good Time"—Crosby, Stills, & Nash

- New Pairs

- None

==== Week 5 (July 10, 2008) ====
- Group dance: Top 12: "Closer"—Ne-Yo (Hip-Hop; Choreographers: Tabitha and Napoleon D'umo)
- Guest dancer(s): Alvin Ailey American Dance Theater "Revelations": "Sinner Man"—Billy Porter (Modern ballet)
- Musical guest: "I Kissed a Girl"—Katy Perry
- Solos:

| Contestant | Style | Music | Result |
|---|---|---|---|
| Comfort Fedoke | Hip-Hop | "Oh Timbaland"—Timbaland | Eliminated* |
| Thayne Jasperson | Contemporary | "Come Home"—OneRepublic | Eliminated |
| Jessica King | Contemporary | "Best for Last"—Adele | Safe* |
| William Wingfield | African Jazz | "Daraijan"—Kodo | Safe |
| Kherington Payne | Contemporary | "All We Are"—OneRepublic | Safe |
| Stephen "tWitch" Boss | Hip-Hop | "We Gonna Win"—Miri Ben-Ari | Safe |

- Eliminated:

- Comfort Fedoke: "The Greatest"—Michelle Williams
- Thayne Jasperson: "Believe"—Staind

- New Pairs:

- None. Now that only the top ten remain, new pairs are randomly assigned each week, and they'll be voted individually.

* It was reported on July 14, 2008, that Jessica King was injured and as a result could not continue in the competition. Comfort Fedoke returned to the show in place of King.

==== Week 6 (July 17, 2008) ====
- Group dances:

| Contestants | Style | Music | Choreographer(s) |
|---|---|---|---|
| Top 10 | Bollywood | "JBJ" from Jhoom Barabar Jhoom | Nakul Dev Mahajan |
| Top 5 female contestants | Contemporary | "Ave Maria"—Celine Dion | Mia Michaels |
| Top 5 male contestants | Broadway | "Five Guys Named Moe" from Five Guys Named Moe | Nigel Lythgoe; Chuck Maldonado assisting |

- Solos:

| Contestant | Style | Music | Result |
|---|---|---|---|
| Comfort Fedoke | Hip-Hop | "Egypt, Egypt"—Egyptian Lover | Safe |
| Mark Kanemura | Pop-Jazz | "Black Betty"—Ram Jam | Safe |
| Kherington Payne | Jazz | "Myphilosophy"—Inner | Eliminated |
| Gev Manoukian | Breakdance | "Feeling Good"—Michael Bublé | Eliminated |

- Eliminated:

- Kherington Payne: "Forever May You Run"—Gavin Rossdale
- Gev Manoukian: "It Ends Tonight"—The All-American Rejects

==== Week 7 (July 24, 2008) ====
- Group dance: Top 8: "Universal Mind Control"—Common (Hip-Hop; Choreographer: Chuck Maldonado)
- Guest dancer(s): Los Angeles Ballet Pas de deux: "The Man I Love" from Who Cares?
- Musical guest: "Baby"—LL Cool J featuring The-Dream
- Solos:

| Contestant | Style | Music | Result |
|---|---|---|---|
| Comfort Fedoke | Hip-Hop | "Like This"—Mims | Eliminated |
| William Wingfield | Contemporary | "Closer"—Goapele | Eliminated |
| Courtney Galiano | Jazz | "Passion"—Kreesha Turner | Safe |
| Stephen "tWitch" Boss | Locking | "Hollywood Swinging"—Kool & the Gang | Safe |

- Eliminated:

- Comfort Fedoke: "Come Home"—OneRepublic
- William Wingfield: "Love Remains the Same"—Gavin Rossdale

==== Week 8 (July 31, 2008) ====
- Group dance: Top 6: "The Rose"—Bette Midler (Contemporary; Choreographer: Mandy Moore)
- Guest dancer(s): Lil' Demon: "Planet Rock"—Afrika Bambaataa & The Soul Sonic Force (Breakdance)
- Musical guest: "Just Dance"—Lady Gaga
- Top 6 contestant's solos:

| Contestant | Style | Music | Result |
|---|---|---|---|
| Courtney Galiano | Contemporary | "Almost Lover"—A Fine Frenzy | Safe |
| Mark Kanemura | Pop-Jazz | "Wind It Up (Original Neptunes Mix)"—Gwen Stefani | Eliminated |
| Katee Shean | Contemporary | "Beautiful Disaster"—Jon McLaughlin | Safe |
| Joshua Allen | Popping | "I Can Make You Dance"—Zapp | Safe |
| Chelsie Hightower | Jive | "The Girl's Gone Wild"—Travis Tritt | Eliminated |
| Stephen "tWitch" Boss | Funk | "Don't Worry, Be Happy"—Bobby McFerrin | Safe |

- Eliminated:

- Chelsie Hightower: "Come Home"—OneRepublic
- Mark Kanemura: "All I Can See"—Brendan James

==== Week 9 (Grand Finale) (August 7, 2008) ====
Judges: Nigel Lythgoe, Mary Murphy, Debbie Allen, Lil' C, Adam Shankman, Mia Michaels

- Group dances:

| Contestants | Style | Music | Choreographer(s) |
|---|---|---|---|
| Top 20^{1} | Hip-Hop | "Boom"—Sin featuring T-Pain | Shane Sparks |
| Top 5 male contestants | Broadway | "Five Guys Named Moe" from Five Guys Named Moe | Nigel Lythgoe; Chuck Maldonado assisting |

- Guest dancers:

| Dancer(s) | Style | Music |
|---|---|---|
| Robert Muraine; Phillip Chbeeb | Popping Battle^{2} (winner: Muraine by a vote of 5–1) | "Stronger"—Kanye West |
| Mary Murphy; Dmitry Chaplin | Samba | "Baila, Baila"—Angela Via |
| Cirque du Soleil/ Cast of Criss Angel Believe | Pop-Jazz (choreographer: Wade Robson) | "Homage to the Rabbits"—Éric Serra |
| Debbie Allen Dance Academy; Nigel Lythgoe | Tap | "Boogie Wonderland"—Earth, Wind & Fire feat. The Emotions |
| Earlier contestants with Top 20^{3} | Discoswing | "Don't Stop the Music"—Rihanna |

- Musical guest: "Burnin' Up"—Jonas Brothers

^1 All of the top 20 but Jessica King performed. King, who was still injured, was not featured in the group opening.
^2 Muraine and Chbeeb both auditioned earlier in the season. Chbeeb contracted pneumonia and was medically advised to withdraw and Muraine later quit during the Las Vegas auditions. Chbeeb was later selected to the Top 20 for Season 5.
^3 Dmitry Chaplin, Ryan Conferido, Anya Garnis, Jaimie Goodwin, Allison Holker, Lauren Gottlieb, Neil Haskell, Hok Konishi, Ivan Koumaev, Melody Lacayanga, Dominic Sandoval, Benji Schwimmer and Travis Wall

===== Judges' picks =====
| Couple | Style | Music | Choreographer(s) | Chosen by |
|---|---|---|---|---|
| Katee Shean; Joshua Allen | Bollywood | "Dhoom Taana" from Om Shanti Om | Nakul Dev Mahajan | Nigel Lythgoe |
| Courtney Galiano; Gev Manoukian | Rumba | "Wishing on a Star"—Rose Royce | Tony Meredith; Melanie LaPatin assisting | Mary Murphy |
| Comfort Fedoke; Stephen "tWitch" Boss | Hip-Hop | "Forever"—Chris Brown | Dave Scott | Adam Shankman |
| Chelsie Hightower; Mark Kanemura | Lyrical hip-hop | "Bleeding Love"—Leona Lewis | Tabitha and Napoleon D'umo | Lil' C |
| Katee Shean; William Wingfield | Pas de deux | "Imagine"—David Archuleta | Dwight Rhoden; Desmond Richardson | Mia Michaels |
| Courtney Galiano; Mark Kanemura | Jazz | "The Garden"—Mirah | Sonya Tayeh | Adam Shankman |
| Katee Shean; Stephen "tWitch" Boss | Contemporary | "Mercy"—Duffy | Mia Michaels | Mary Murphy |
| Kherington Payne; Stephen "tWitch" Boss | Viennese Waltz | "A New Day Has Come"—Celine Dion | Jean-Marc Généreux; France Mousseau assisting | Debbie Allen |
| Katee Shean; Joshua Allen | Lyrical hip-hop | "No Air"—Jordin Sparks & Chris Brown | Tabitha and Napoleon D'umo | Nigel Lythgoe |

- 4th Place

- Courtney Galiano: "It's Only Life"—Kate Voegele

- 3rd Place

- Katee Shean: "From Where You Are"—Lifehouse (She won $50,000 for being the top female contestant.)

- Runner-Up:

- Stephen "tWitch" Boss

- Winner
  - Joshua Allen

== Awards ==
=== 2009 Emmy Awards ===
| Result | Category | Recipient(s)/ Choreographer(s) | Performers | Music |
|---|---|---|---|---|
| Nominated | Outstanding Choreography | Napoleon and Tabitha D'umo | Chelsie Hightower; Mark Kanemura | "Bleeding Love"—Leona Lewis |
| Nominated | Outstanding Choreography | Mia Michaels | Katee Shean; Stephen "tWitch" Bos | "Mercy"—Duffy |
| Won^{†} | Outstanding Choreography | Tyce Diorio | Jessica King; William Wingfield | "Silence" from Unfaithful |
| Nominated | Outstanding Choreography | Dmitry Chaplin | Chelsie Hightower; Joshua Allen | "A Los Amigos" from Forever Tango |
| Won | Outstanding Makeup For A Multi-Camera; Series Or Special (Non-Prosthetic) | Amy Strozzi; Heather Cummings; Tifanie White; Marie DelPrete | — | — |
| Won | Outstanding Costumes For A Variety/Music Program Or Special | Soyon An | — | — |

^{†} Tyce Diorio, along with Rob Ashford from 81st Academy Awards were joint-winners.

== Broadcast outside of US ==
It is broadcast on the Canadian channels, CTV and MuchMusic, and also on Fox Life in Poland. It is also broadcast on TVNorge in Norway and Nelonen in Finland! It is also broadcast on Channel 10 in Australia and on AXN in India.

== Ratings ==
=== U.S. Nielsen ratings ===
| Show | Episode | First air date | Rating (18–49) | Share (18–49) | Viewers (millions) | Rank (timeslot) | Rank (night) |
|---|---|---|---|---|---|---|---|
| 1 | Season Premiere, Part 1 | May 22, 2008 | 5.3 | 9 | 6.7 | 3 | 5 (tied) |
| 2 | Season Premiere, Part 2 | May 28, 2008 | 5.8 | 10 | N/A | 1 | 3 |
| 3 | Auditions Episode | May 29, 2008 | 3.6 | 11 | 9.4 | 1 | 2 |
| 4 | Auditions Episode | June 4, 2008 | 6.0 | 10 | 9.6 | 1 | 2 |
| 5 | Las Vegas Round | June 5, 2008 | 5.6 | 10 | 9.2 | 1 | 4 |
| 6 | Top 20 Perform | June 11, 2008 | 5.5 | 10 | 8.9 | 1 | 3 |
| 7 | 2 of 20 Voted Off | June 12, 2008 | 5.1 | 9 | 8.0 | 3 | 4 |
| 8 | Top 18 Perform | June 18, 2008 | 5.4 | 9 | 8.9 | 1 | 2 |
| 9 | 2 of 18 Voted Off | June 19, 2008 | 5.4 | 9 | 8.9 | 1 | 1 |
| 10 | Top 16 Perform | June 25, 2008 | 5.1 | 9 | 8.3 | 1 | 3 |
| 11 | 2 of 16 Voted Off | June 26, 2008 | 5.2 | 9 | 8.6 | 1 | 1 |
| 12 | Top 14 Perform | July 2, 2008 | 5.3 | 10 | 8.8 | 1 | 3 |
| 13 | 2 of 14 Voted Off | July 3, 2008 | 4.3 | 8 | 6.8 | 2 | 2 |
| 14 | Top 12 Perform | July 9, 2008 | 5.5 | 10 | 8.9 | 1 | 2 |
| 15 | 2 of 12 Voted Off | July 10, 2008 | 5.3 | 9 | 8.9 | 2 | 3 |
| 16 | Top 10 Perform | July 16, 2008 | 5.6 | 10 | 9.0 | 1 | 3 |
| 17 | 2 of 10 Voted Off | July 17, 2008 | 5.2 | 9 | 8.4 | 2 | 2 |
| 18 | Top 8 Perform | July 23, 2008 | 5.3 | 9 | 8.6 | 1 | 2 |
| 19 | 2 of 8 Voted Off | July 24, 2008 | 5.2 | 9 | 8.4 | 1 | 1 |
| 20 | Top 6 Perform | July 30, 2008 | 5.6 | 9 | 8.8 | 2 | 2 |
| 21 | 2 of 6 Voted Off | July 31, 2008 | 5.5 | 9 | 8.7 | 1 (tied) | 1 (tied) |
| 22 | Top 4 Perform | August 6, 2008 | 4.3 | 8 | 9.0 | 1 | 3 |
| 23 | Winner Announced | August 7, 2008 | 5.9 | 10 | 9.7 | 1 | 1 |

== See also ==
- List of So You Think You Can Dance finalists
