= Chelsie Hightower =

American ballroom dancer

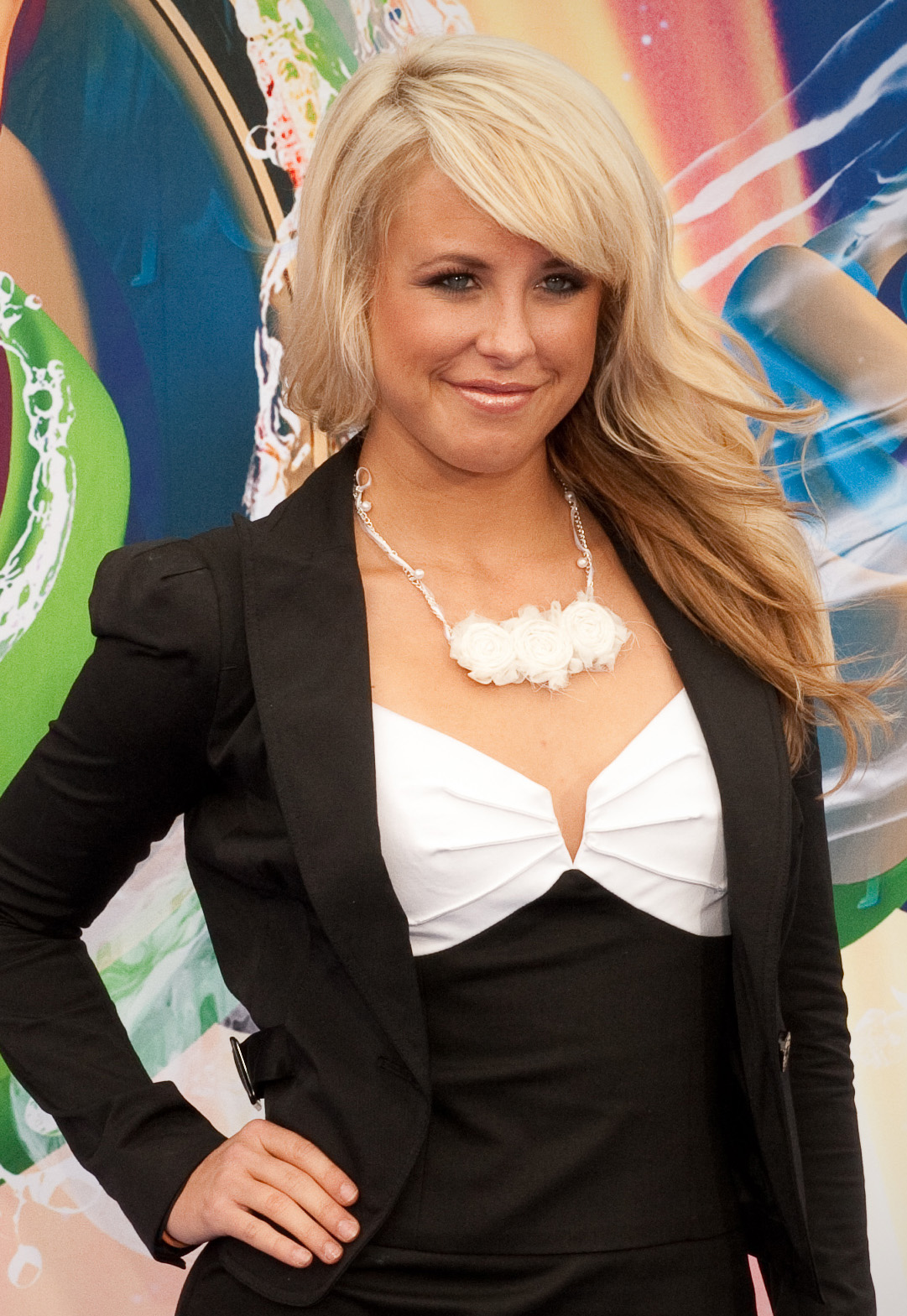
- Hightower in 2010
- Born: Chelsie Kay Hightower; July 21, 1989 (age 37); Las Vegas, Nevada, U.S.
- Occupations: Dancer, choreographer
- Years active: 1998–present

Chelsie Kay Hightower (born July 21, 1989) is an American ballroom dancer. She is known for being a regular dance partner, trainer and choreographer on the ABC competition show Dancing with the Stars, on which she was a professional from Season 8 to 15, excluding Season 13.

== Biography ==
Chelsie Kay Hightower was born in Las Vegas, Nevada, and raised in Orem, Utah with her twin brother and four older brothers until her mother and father divorced in 2006. She started dancing when she was nine years old and received conventional training from the age of 14. She has been trained in ballroom, jazz, ballet, and hip-hop. Hightower has performed in musical theaters across the United States and won her first national title when she was 11. She was a U.S. Worlds finalist in 2005, and competed on Team USA during the British Open in Blackpool, England. She graduated from Timpanogos High School, then attended Utah Valley University.

== So You Think You Can Dance ==
At age 18, she made her television debut on season four of So You Think You Can Dance. She is remembered for her Emmy nominated performances with Mark Kanemura to a revision of "Bleeding Love" by Leona Lewis choreographed by Nappytabs and with Joshua Allen to "A Los Amigos" choreographed by Dmitry Chaplin. She was eliminated from the U.S. reality TV show on July 31, 2008, after making it to the semi-finals. Hightower was part of one of the two couples who avoided being in the bottom 3 couples in Season 4. She returned in season eight as an All-Star and in season 10 as a choreographer and All-Star.

=== So You Think You Can Dance performances ===
Week	Partner	Dance	Song	Result
1	Mark Kanemura	Contemporary	"Beautiful" – Meshell Ndegeocello	Safe
2	Mark Kanemura	Argentine tango	"Mi Confesión" – Gotan Project	Safe
3	Mark Kanemura	Lyrical hip-hop	"Bleeding Love" – Leona Lewis	Safe
4	Mark Kanemura	Jazz	"Kiss Kiss" – Holly Valance	Safe
4	Mark Kanemura	Foxtrot	"It's My Life" – Paul Anka	Safe
5	Mark Kanemura	Salsa	"Fuego" – Joe Bataan	Safe
5	Mark Kanemura	Broadway	"I'm a Woman" from Smokey Joe's Cafe	Safe
6	Gev Manoukian	Contemporary	"These Arms of Mine" – Otis Redding	Safe
6	Gev Manoukian	Jive	"The House is Rockin'" – Brian Setzer Orch.	Safe
6	Solo		"Pon de Replay" – Rihanna	Safe
7	Joshua Allen	Argentine tango	"A Los Amigos" from Forever Tango	Safe
7	Joshua Allen	Disco	"Everlasting Love" – Gloria Estefan	Safe
7	Solo		"Damaged" – Danity Kane	Safe
8	Stephen "Twitch" Boss	Mambo	"Ahora Me Toca A Mi" – Víctor Manuelle	Eliminated
8	Stephen "Twitch" Boss	Hip hop	"Control" – Vitamin String Quartet	Eliminated
8	Solo		"When I Grow Up" – The Pussycat Dolls	Eliminated
8	Results show solo		"The Girl's Gone Wild" – Travis Tritt	Eliminated

== Dancing with the Stars ==
Hightower joined the season eight cast of Dancing with the Stars as a professional dancer, and was partnered with Ty Murray, a nine-time World Champion rodeo cowboy. On May 12, 2009, she and Murray were eliminated from the competition with a 4th-place finish. This is Hightower's best finish to date. Her partner for season nine was professional snowboarder Louie Vito. They were eliminated in week six of the competition, and came in eighth place. For season ten she was partnered with The Bachelor star Jake Pavelka. They were voted off in week six of the competition, and came in seventh place. She was paired with Michael Bolton in season 11. The couple were eliminated in week two. For season 12 she was partnered with rapper and actor Romeo Miller. They were eliminated in week eight of the competition, and came in fifth place. She was not on season 13 (2011), but returned in season 14 (2012) partnered with Disney Channel star Roshon Fegan. The couple was eliminated on week eight, finishing in sixth place. Hightower earned her highest score and her best average with any partner with Fegan earning 29/30 for their Foxtrot and earning an average of 25.7. For season 15 (the first "all-stars" season), she was partnered with season five winner Hélio Castroneves. They were voted off during a double elimination in week three and finished in 10th place.

Hightower made an appearance in Sports Illustrated Swimsuit Winter 2010 edition (pages 152 and 153) along with three other couples from Dancing with the Stars. On July 8, 2010, she received an Emmy nomination for the "Paso doble/Malagueña" dance that she and Derek Hough performed and co-choreographed for season ten.

Hightower has performed with singer-songwriter Jewel in concert on Jewel's hit "Hands."

== Dancing With the Stars performances ==
Chelsie's average score from all her partners is 21.03 points.

Season	Partner	Place
8	Ty Murray	4th
9	Louie Vito	8th
10	Jake Pavelka	7th
11	Michael Bolton	11th
12	Romeo	5th
14	Roshon Fegan	6th
15	Hélio Castroneves	10th

=== Season 8 with Ty Murray (average: 22.4) ===
Week #	Dance / Song	Judges' scores			Result
Week #	Dance / Song	Inaba	Goodman	Tonioli	Result
1	Cha-cha-cha / "Train in Vain"	5	4	5	No elimination
2	Quickstep / "Life is a Highway"	7	6	7	Safe
3	Foxtrot / "Come Dance With Me"	8	8	7	Safe
4	Lindy Hop / "You and Me and the Bottle Makes 3 Tonight"	9	8	8	Safe
5	Paso doble / "Barracuda"	7	7	7	Safe
6	Jive / "The Girl's Gone Wild"	6	6	6	Last to be called safe
7	Waltz / "Strawberry Wine"	8	8	8	Last to be called safe
8	Salsa / "Vehicle"; Team Tango / "Womanizer"	9; 9	7; 9	8; 10	Safe
9	Argentine Tango / "Amor Que Se Baila"; Rumba / "Free Fallin'"	8; 7	9; 7	8; 7	Bottom 2
10; Semi-finals	Viennese Waltz / "Tuesday's Gone"; Samba / "Concrete and Clay"	8; 8	9; 7	8; 8	Eliminated

=== Season 9 with Louie Vito (average: 19.5) ===
Week #	Dance / Song	Judges' scores			Result
Week #	Dance / Song	Inaba	Goodman	Tonioli	Result
1	Foxtrot / "It's My Life"	6	7	6	Safe
1	Salsa Relay / "Get Busy"—Sean Paul	Awarded 8 points			Safe
2	Jive / "Crash"	6	7*	6	Safe
3	Rumba / "Total Eclipse of the Heart"	8	5	7	Safe
4	Two Step / "Sweet Home Alabama"	5	5	6	Safe
5	Argentine Tango / "Sin Rumbo"	7	8	7	Safe
6	Jitterbug / "Baby Likes To Rock It"; Mambo Marathon / "Ran Kan Kan"	7 Awarded	7; 3	7 points	Eliminated

^*Due to Len Goodman's absence in week two, the 7 was awarded by stand-in guest judge Baz Luhrmann.

=== Season 10 with Jake Pavelka (average: 20.4) ===
Week #	Dance / Song	Judges' scores			Result
Week #	Dance / Song	Inaba	Goodman	Tonioli	Result
1	Viennese Waltz / "Kiss From a Rose"	7	6	7	No elimination
2	Jive / "Hip to be Square"	6	7	7	Safe
3	Quickstep / "Walk Like An Egyptian"	7	7	7	Last to be called safe
4	Tango / "A Girl Like You"	6/7	7/6	6/6	Safe
5	Cha-cha-cha / "Old Time Rock and Roll"	8	7	8	Safe
6	Samba / "Comanche"; Swing Marathon / "In the Mood"	7 Awarded	7; 4	7 points	Eliminated

=== Season 11 with Michael Bolton (average: 14.0) ===
Week #	Dance / Song	Judges' scores			Result
Week #	Dance / Song	Inaba	Goodman	Tonioli	Result
1	Viennese Waltz / "Life After You"	6	5	5	Safe
2	Jive / "Hound Dog"	4	5	3	Eliminated

=== Season 12 with Romeo Miller (average: 23.6) ===
Week #	Dance / Song	Judges' scores			Result
Week #	Dance / Song	Inaba	Goodman	Tonioli	Result
1	Cha-cha-cha / "Romeo"	7	6	6	No elimination
2	Quickstep / "You're the One That I Want"	7	8	8	Safe
3	Rumba / "I'll Be There"	7	6	7	Safe
4	Paso doble / "Palladio, First Movement"	7	8	8	Safe
5	Foxtrot / "New York, New York"	9	8	9	Safe
6	Waltz / "My Heart Will Go On"	10	9	9	Safe
7	Samba / "Say Hey (I Love You)"; Team Cha-cha-cha / "Born This Way"	7/8; 8/8	7; 7	8; 7	Safe
8	Tango / "Hold It Against Me"; Salsa (Instant-Dance) / "Tequila"	9; 8	9; 9	9; 8	Eliminated

- Scores for weeks 1 & 2 were combined and first results were revealed on March 29, 2011
- Week seven guest judge Donnie Burns score is before Carrie Ann's
- Average score does not include guest judge's score on week seven

=== Season 14 with Roshon Fegan (average: 25.7) ===
Week #	Dance / Song	Judges' scores			Result
Week #	Dance / Song	Inaba	Goodman	Tonioli	Result
1	Cha-cha-cha / "Glad You Came"	8	7	8	No elimination
2	Quickstep / "Lifestyles of the Rich and Famous"	9	8	9	Safe
3	Samba / "I Want You Back"	8	8	9	Safe
4	Viennese Waltz / "The Time of My Life"	9	8	9	Bottom 2
5	Salsa / "Bumpy Ride"	9	8	9	Safe
6	Rumba / "Cruisin"; Motown Marathon / "Nowhere to Run"; Dance Duel Jive / "Don't Stop Me Now"	7 Awarded; Saved	8; 5 by	8 points judges	Bottom 2
7	Argentine Tango / "Bad Romance"; Team Tango / "Toccata"; Dance Duel Rumba / "Set Fire to the Rain"	9; 10; Saved	8; 8 by	8; 9 judges	Bottom 2
8	Foxtrot / "Sweet Pea"; Paso doble / "Turn Me On"	10; 9	9; 9	10; 9	Eliminated

- Average score does not include marathon dance in week six

=== Season 15 with Hélio Castroneves (average: 23.3) ===
Week #	Dance / Song	Judges' scores			Result
Week #	Dance / Song	Inaba	Goodman	Tonioli	Result
1	Foxtrot / "Pride and Joy"	7.0	7.5	7.0	Safe
2	Jive / "Everybody Talks"	8.0	7.5	7.5	Bottom Two
3	Quickstep / "Mr. Pinstripe Suit"	8.5	8.5	8.5	Eliminated

== Other dance work ==
From November 1, 2014, through April 19, 2015, Hightower performed with Dancing Pros Live, a touring show in which five dance couples compete and then the audience picks the winner. She was joined on the 50+ city tour by fellow Dancing with the Stars alumni, Edyta Śliwińska and Karina Smirnoff who acted as judges.

== Other dance achievements ==
- 2005: U.S. Representative to the Worlds
- 2005: U.S. National Standard Finalist
- 2005: 10 Dance National Youth Champion
- 2006: International Latin Finalist

== Acting ==
Hightower has had several acting credits, including the lead role of Olivia in the Lifetime Network 2021 movie "Stalked in Paradise".
