= Joe McLean =

Joe McLean may refer to:

- Joe McLean (cyclist)
- Joe McLean (ice hockey)

== See also ==
- Joe McClean, American screenwriter, director and producer
- Joe McClean (rugby league)
