= Robert Muraine =

American popping dancer (born 1987)

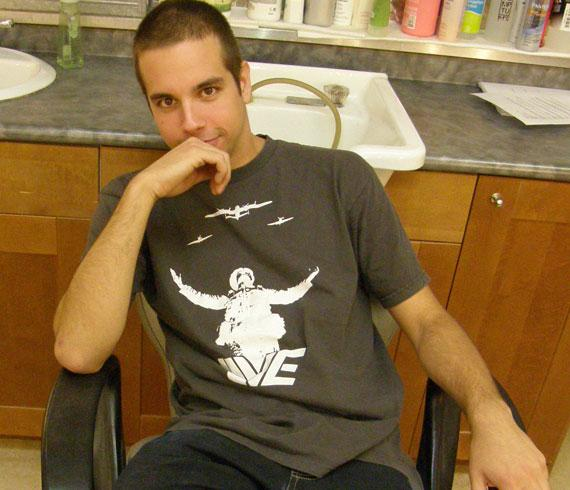
- Muraine, circa 2010
- Born: Robert Leo Muraine II; July 2, 1987 (age 39); North East Los Angeles, California, U.S.
- Height: 6.1 ft (186 cm)
- Dancing career
- Dances: popping

Robert "Mr. Fantastic" Muraine (born July 2, 1987, in North East Los Angeles, California) is an American dancer in the popping style.

== Early life and education ==
He was born in East Los Angeles, California.

== Career ==
Muraine gained international attention when he gave a lengthy audition to the instrumental of the obscure tune "It's Me Bitches" by Swizz Beats for Season 4 of the television program So You Think You Can Dance, during which executive producer and judge Nigel Lythgoe declared that Muraine was his favorite dancer of 2008 and then handed him the ticket in a mock slow-motion fashion. Many So You Think You Can Dance viewers uploaded the audition to their YouTube accounts moments after the show aired, making the audition clip one of So You Think You Can Dance's most successful viral videos, earning around 26,000,000 accumulated views only a week after the video surfaced. Muraine later quit the show during contestant selection due to the difficult choreography, but appeared later in the season for a guest performance, after which Lythgoe suggested a dance-off with Phillip "PacMan" Chbeeb. The dance-off aired in August 2008 during the season finale and the judges selected Muraine as the winner.

Muraine also represented the U.S. in Superstars of Dance on NBC later in fall of 2008, specifically winning the bronze medal in the solo category, which helped lead the U.S. to take the top prize for the season. He was referred to as the "popping soloist" of the team.

In the same year, Muraine starred in a television commercial for retailer IKEA in 2008 called "What Goes Where?" in which he arranges IKEA products alongside Shugamai Johnson performing with robot dance and liquid dancing. Muraine also starred in various other commercials and viral videos in 2008, including advertisements for Pringles, BlackBerry, Stirke Bowling and Uvestment. Muraine also collaborated with Laurent Bremond, a French filmmaker, in 2008 to make a short viral documentary about Muraine's unique dance and way of life.

From 2009 to early 2011, Muraine was involved in the Cirque Dreams: Illumination 2009–2010 tour of the U.S. He was majorly featured in segments "An Urban Beat with Robert Muraine" a short number constructed with help of choreographer Ruddy Betancourt [New Century Dance Company] and "Detour" a number in which Muraine and the Mongolian contortion group Contortion Sisters put together a "twisted & funky" mix of his dancing and the troupe's traditional contortion.

Between the shows and seasons of his tour with Illumination, Muraine would be asked to perform in various parts of the World of Dance Tour – "the largest urban dance competition in the United States focusing on the art of street dance and choreography, taking place in fourteen cities in the United States, Canada, and the United Kingdom". Several video clips of his freestyle performances at World of Dance shows have been uploaded and posted by audiences all over the U.S. to have gained millions of international views to this day.

In summer and fall of 2011, Muraine was contracted for his first time abroad in the German circus show called Magnifico directed by André Heller. Shortly after the tour launched, the company filed for bankruptcy, leaving Muraine as a free agent in Europe.

In 2012 and 2013, Muraine earned medals for his 'Eccentric Dance' piece in the Festival Mondial du Cirque de Demain in France and The Nikulin Circus Festival in Moscow, in which he also earned "the most creative act of 2012" award.

Today, Muraine travels the world performing in live shows. He works with the Crazy Horse cabaret in Paris and is currently developing his "new contortion number" and arranging "a few comedy acts for future festivals".

He now travels back and forth between Los Angeles and Paris and working as an international freelance entertainer.
