= Viral (upcoming film) =

- Directed by: Blair Underwood
- Written by: Joe McClean
- Produced by: Blair Underwood; Joe McClean; Daniel Cypress; John Kalafatis; Joanna Kalafatis; Andreas Ignatiou
- Starring: Blair Underwood; Sarah Silverman; Jeanine Mason
- Cinematography: Jimmy Ferguson
- Edited by: Jouvens Exantus
- Music by: Jose Cancela; Dave Kushner
- Production companies: Ginger Beard; Thirty3rd Street Productions; York Films
- Country: United States
- Language: English

Viral is an upcoming American psychological thriller film written by Joe McClean, directed by Blair Underwood and starring Underwood, Sarah Silverman, and Jeanine Mason.

== Cast ==
- Blair Underwood as Andrew
- Sarah Silverman as Emilia
- Jeanine Mason as Jules
- Clint James
- Brendan Burke
- Samuel Garnett
- Jo Twiss
- Connor Paolo
- Erik Jensen
- Alfre Woodard as Dr. Johnetta

== Production ==
On May 3, 2021, it was announced that Underwood would star in and direct the film. The next day, it was announced that Silverman will also star in the film. On May 19, it was announced that Mason, James, Burke, Garnett, Twiss and Paolo had been cast in the film. On June 3, it was announced that Woodard and Jensen were cast and that production on the film was underway in New York.

Filming occurred in Suffern, New York, in June 2021.
