= Jeanine Mason =

American actress and dancer (born 1991)

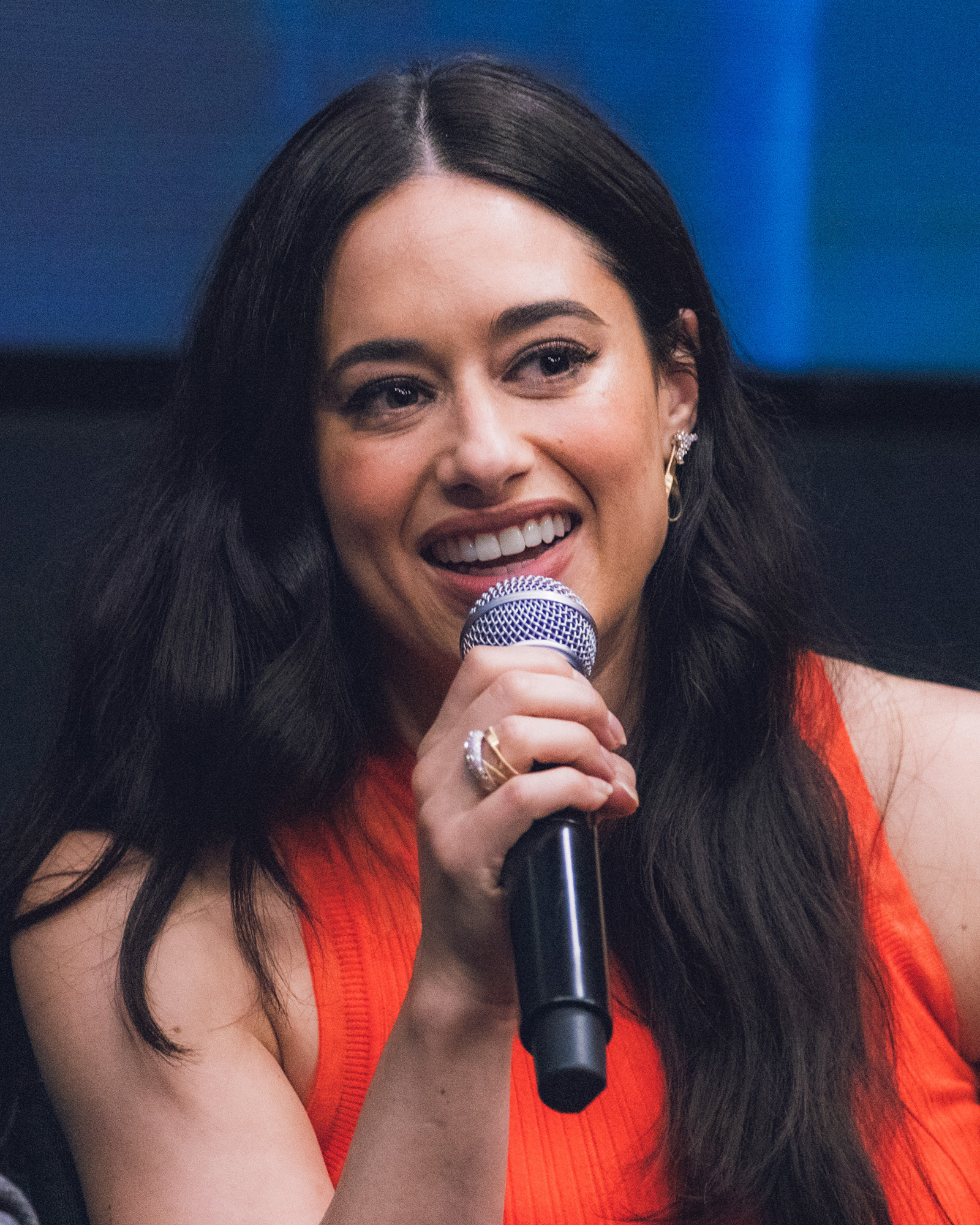
- Mason in 2026
- Born: Jeanine Marie Mason; January 14, 1991 (age 35); Miami, Florida, U.S.
- Education: University of California, Los Angeles (BA)
- Occupations: Actress, dancer
- Years active: 1994–present
- Known for: Winner of So You Think You Can Dance; Roswell, New Mexico
- Height: 5 ft 4 in (163 cm)
- Spouse: Nicholas (m. 2023)
- Children: 1
- Website: jeaninemason.com

Jeanine Marie Mason (born January 14, 1991) is an American actress and dancer. Her acting career began after winning the fifth season of the Fox television show So You Think You Can Dance in 2009. She is best known for her role as Liz Ortecho in the CW's drama series Roswell, New Mexico.

Mason had a recurring role as Dr. Sam Bello on Grey's Anatomy. She has also appeared in Bunheads, Of Kings and Prophets, You’re the Worst, Awkward, Major Crimes, NCIS: Los Angeles, CSI: Crime Scene Investigation, Cross, Big Time Rush , and Chicago Fire.

Mason became the first Cuban-American to win So You Think You Can Dance. Her film credits include the thriller Default, opposite David Oyelowo and The Archer, opposite Bailey Noble.

On stage, she was last seen in Center Theatre Group's 2017 revival of Zoot Suit directed by playwright Luis Valdez opposite Demián Bichir.

== Early life and education ==
Mason was born in Miami, Florida and grew up in a dance-oriented family in Pinecrest. Both of her parents are of Cuban descent. Mason began her dance training at the age of three in ballet and flamenco, and went on to study jazz, acrobatics, hip-hop, modern, and contemporary dance. Mason began her study of theatre at age 11 with community and middle school productions. Upon moving to Los Angeles, California, Mason continued to study theater while also keeping a focus on film and television at the Michael Woolson Studio. Mason earned a Bachelor of Arts in World Arts and Cultures, graduating cum laude, from the University of California, Los Angeles in the spring of 2014.

== Career ==
=== So You Think You Can Dance ===
At the age of 18, Mason competed on the fifth season of the show So You Think You Can Dance, becoming the youngest winner in the history of the competition, over fellow contestants Brandon Bryant, Kayla Radomski and Evan Kasprzak. For the first five weeks of the competition (Top 20 to Top 12), Mason was partnered with Phillip Chbeeb. During the show's sixth week (Top 10), Mason danced a contemporary number choreographed by Travis Wall and was partnered with Jason Glover. Later, Mason was also partnered with Brandon Bryant, Ade Obayomi, Evan Kasprzak, and Kayla Radomski. Mason was consistently praised for her strong and versatile performances.

During the fall of 2009, Mason toured the United States with the top twelve dancers of the So You Think You Can Dance competition.

==== Performances ====
click [show] to see performances

Week	Partner	Dance	Song	Result
1	Phillip Chbeeb	Hip-Hop	"Mad"—Ne-Yo	Safe
2	Phillip Chbeeb	Tango	"Violento (Up Mix)"—Bailongo!	Safe
3	Phillip Chbeeb	Broadway	"Moses Supposes"—from”Singin' in the Rain”	Safe
4	Phillip Chbeeb	Hip-Hop	"Love Lockdown"—Kanye West	Bottom 3
4	Phillip Chbeeb	Results show solo	"Moonlight Sonata"—Smart Sleep With Classical	Bottom 3
5	Phillip Chbeeb	Russian folk dance	"Kalinka"—Barynya	Bottom 3
5	Phillip Chbeeb	Jive	"Stuff Like That There"—Bette Midler	Bottom 3
5	Phillip Chbeeb	Results show solo	"Baby's Romance"—Chris Garneau	Bottom 3
6	Jason Glover	Contemporary	"If It Kills Me (The Casa Nova Sessions)"—Jason Mraz	Safe
6	Performance show solo		"Violento (Up Mix)"—Bailongo!	Safe
7	Brandon Bryant	Smooth Waltz	"May It Be"— Hayley Westenra	Safe
7	Brandon Bryant	Pop Jazz	"Battlefield"—Jordin Sparks	Safe
7	Performance show solo		"Let the Drummer Kick"—Citizen Cope	Safe
8	Ade Obayomi	Samba	"LoveGame"—Lady Gaga	Safe
8	Ade Obayomi	Hip-Hop	"Move (If You Wanna)"—Mims	Safe
8	Performance show solo		"Feedback"—Janet Jackson	Safe
9	Evan Kasprzak	Jazz	"Heartbreaker"—MSTRKRFT featuring John Legend	Winner
9	Kayla Radomski	Contemporary	"The Four Sections: IV (Full Orchestra)"—Steve Reich	Winner
9	Brandon Bryant	Paso Doble	”Tetsujin"— from The Matrix Revolutions†	Winner
9	Final solo		"Por una Cabeza"—The Tango Project	Winner

=== Acting career ===
Shortly after completing So You Think You Can Dance, Mason turned her attention to acting. Her on-screen career began when she starred in the Halloween episode of Nickelodeon's hit show, Big Time Rush. From there, she appeared in The Bling Ring, CSI: Crime Scene Investigation, The Fresh Beat Band and Hollywood Heights before landing the recurring role of Cozzette on ABC Family's Bunheads and leading roles in Hot Mess and Delirium. She has also booked roles on Major Crimes and Secret Life of the American Teenager as well as several smaller, independent projects. Mason had a recurring role on ABC's hit medical drama Grey's Anatomy as Dr. Sam Bello.

In February 2018, it was announced that she joined the pilot of Roswell, New Mexico as Liz Ortecho. The CW ordered the show to series on May 11, 2018.

Mason performed on November 29, 2009 at the Dizzy Feet Gala in Los Angeles, California at the Kodak Theatre. She and Jason Glover performed their popular contemporary piece, "If It Kills Me", choreographed by Travis Wall, and originally performed Top 10 week on So You Think You Can Dance. Glover has described Mason as "Unique. You just don’t find dancers like her. She has beautiful lines, is funky and charismatic, and has so much life onstage. Not only does it show in her movement but also on her face. Jeanine is a brilliant performer and one of my favorite people to watch—not just in our group, but out of any dancer I've seen, from Gregory Hines to Gene Kelly."

On November 9, 2010, Mason performed a contemporary-ballroom dance with Mark Ballas to John Legend's "Ordinary People" on the television show, Dancing With the Stars.

Her sister, Alexis, also auditioned for the eighth season of So You Think You Can Dance, and made it to the final solo performances before Top 20 in Vegas.

== Personal life ==
In March 2023, Mason announced her engagement. In late 2023, Mason married Nicholas, a major in the U.S. Army Reserves. In October 2025, Mason announced that they had welcomed their first child, a son.

== Filmography ==
Film
Year	Title	Role	Notes
2014	Default	Marcela	
2016	El Empantanado (The Muddy)	Heili	
2017	The Archer	Rebecca Rosinsky	
2020	Christmas on the Square	Felicity Sorenson	
2024	Megamind vs. the Doom Syndicate	Christina Christo	Voice
TBA	Viral	Jules	Post-production

Television
Year	Title	Role	Notes
2010	Big Time Rush	Muffy	Episode: "Big Time Halloween"
2011	The Fresh Beat Band	Amy	Episode: "Step It Up"
2011	The Bling Ring	Bosso	Television film
2011	CSI: Crime Scene Investigation	Gween Seligson	Episode: "Brain Doe"
2012	Hollywood Heights	Natalie	2 episodes
2013	Bunheads	Cozzette	7 episodes
2013	The Secret Life of the American Teenager	Bebe	Episode: "Money for Nothin'"
2013	Major Crimes	Heather	Episode: "Jailbait"
2014	Delirium	Hana Tate	Unsold Fox pilot
2014	Awkward	Shayne	Episode: "Prison Breaks"
2014	You're the Worst	Dana	Episode: "Equally Dead Inside"
2014	NCIS: Los Angeles	Bonnie Flores	Episode: "The Grey Man"
2016	Of Kings and Prophets	Merav	Main role; 9 episodes
2017	Searchers	Juniper	Television film
2017	Ride Overshare	Natalie	Episode: "Natalie"
2017	Daytime Divas	Nick	2 episodes
2017	Criminal Minds	Helen Pierce	Episode: "To a Better Place"
2017–18	Grey's Anatomy	Dr. Sam Bello	Recurring role; 12 episodes
2018	Grey's Anatomy: B-Team	Dr. Sam Bello	ABC webseries; 3 episodes
2019–2022	Roswell, New Mexico	Liz Ortecho	Lead role
2020–2022	Trolls: TrollsTopia	Minuet Sonata	Main voice cast; 11 episodes
2021	Grace and Frankie	Dr. Green	Episode: "The Circumcision"
2023	Upload	Karina Silva	Recurring role; 5 episodes
2024	Megamind Rules!	Christina Christo	Voice role; 6 episodes
2024	WondLa	Eva	Lead voice role
2024	The Perfect Couple	Hyacinth	Recurring role; 2 episodes
2026	Cross	Rebecca	Main cast (season 2)
2026	Chicago Fire	Lucy	Guest Star (Season 14)

Preceded by Joshua Allen	Winner of So You Think You Can Dance; Summer 2009	Succeeded by Russell Ferguson
