= Joe McClean =

American screenwriter

- Born: August 29, 1979 (age 47)
- Occupations: Film director, screenwriter and producer

Joe McClean is an American screenwriter, director and producer.

== Early life and education ==
Joe McClean (born on August 29, 1979), attended Paradise Valley High School in Phoenix, Arizona. It was during this time participating in the High School Drama Club that McClean met a group of actors that he still regularly works with, where McClean was cast in plays at Valley Youth Theater, which paved way for many other notable alumni including the likes of Emma Stone, Kimiko Glenn, and Jordin Sparks.

McClean later attended to Southern Utah University (1997 – 1998) on a year scholarship as a reward for his performance in the monologue division of the Utah Shakespearean Festival Competition where he won first place During this time he was chosen to study at the Royal National Theatre studio program in London, England, followed by spending a few years on the road acting in U.S. national touring children's theater. and later obtained certificate in Theatre (2001).

=== Career ===
McClean has written, directed, and produced two indie features, as well as short films and web-series, and is best known for: The Drama Club (2017), Life Tracker (2013) and How to Make a David Lynch Film (2010). McClean founded the production company Ginger Beard films.

=== Acting ===
McClean acted in theater in NJ and NYC, and spent years on the road working with national touring productions of Children's Theater. McClean went on to act in Indie films like H.R. Pukenshette, Demon Resurrection, and Basement.

=== Writer and director ===
McClean switched his focus to writing and directing his own short and feature films. His First feature film was Life Tracker starring Barry Finnegan, Matt Dallas, Rebecca Marshall, Jay Thomas, and Ron Canada. Baron Davis, an NBA star, was one of the film's executive producers, who also invested in the film.

== Filmography ==
- Viral (TBA) - (Psychological thriller)
- The Drama Club (2017) – (Drama)
- Resident Evil: Vendetta (2017) – (Action- horror)
- The Speech (2014) – (Drama)
- Strangers (2014) – (Drama)
- Life Tracker (2013) - (Sci-Fi Drama)
- How To Make A David Lynch Film (2011) – (Comedy)
- Boy Talk (2010) – (Comedy)
- Money, Please! (2009) – (Political Comedy)
