= Mark Kanemura =

American dancer (born 1983)

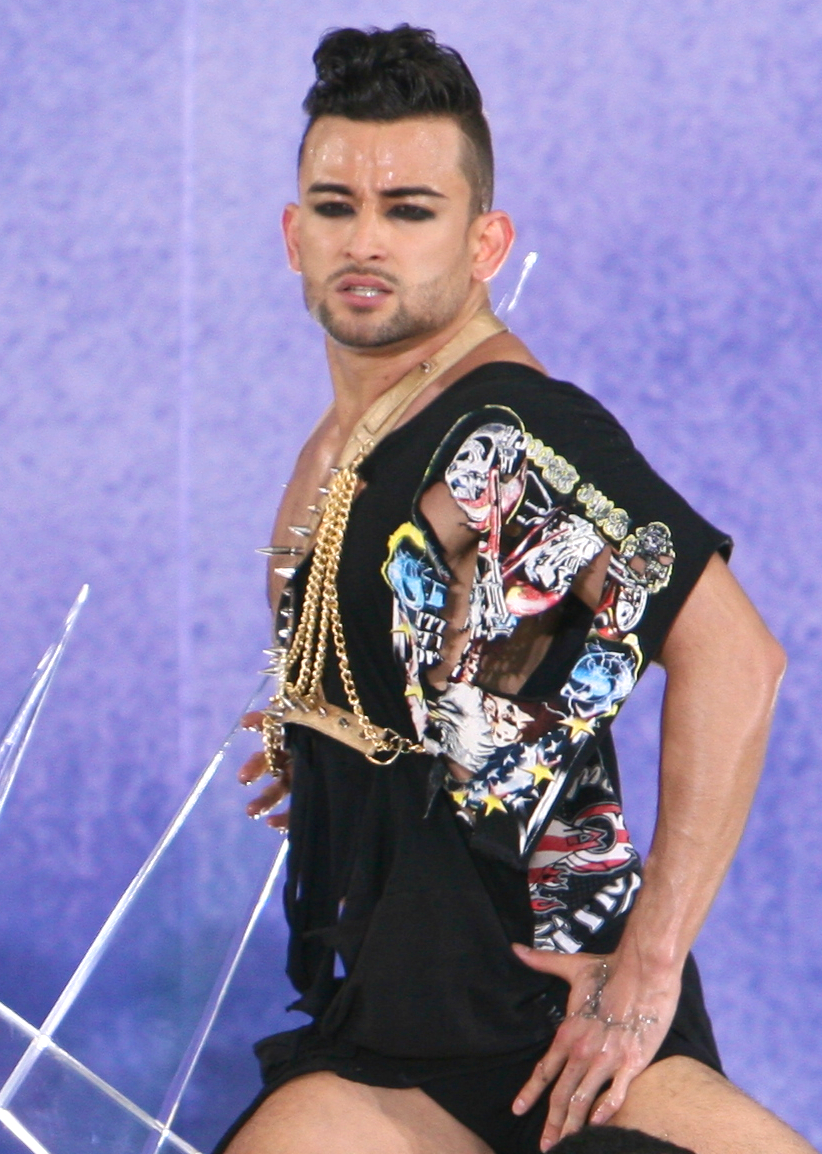
- Kanemura in 2011
- Born: 17 September 1983 (age 43); Honolulu, Hawaii, United States
- Occupation: Dancer
- Years active: 2009–present

Mark Kanemura (born September 17, 1983) is an American dancer noted for appearances on seasons 4 and 7 of So You Think You Can Dance, music video and concert performances, and his Instagram posts.

== Career ==
Kanemura is from Honolulu. His mother, Nora, was born in American Samoa. He was a contestant on season 4 of So You Think You Can Dance until he was sent home in the semi-finals. After, he danced in music videos including "Truly in Love" by Lil Mama. Kanemura is a frequent dance collaborator with Lady Gaga, having traveled and danced with her for The Monster Ball Tour. He also appears in several of her music videos, including "Telephone," "Alejandro," "Born This Way," and "Judas." He was featured in the music video for "Make Me" by Janet Jackson, and has also performed with Katy Perry. Kanemura appeared in season two, episode two, of the television show Glee, titled “Britney/Brittany”. He was on season 7 of So You Think You Can Dance. Kanemura was featured in an episode of Nailed by YouTuber Michael Henry. He's appeared on RuPaul's Drag Race as a dancer and choreographer. In 2018, he danced in several music videos of Carly Rae Jepsen. He has generated a following on Instagram, with several of his posts going viral.

He is known for his quick-changes of wigs.

== Awards and nominations ==
Year	Category	Nominee	Result	Ref.
2020	Queerties' Favorite Social Media follow	Mark Kanemura	Won	

== Filmography ==
- Tongue Thai'd
