= Joshua Allen (dancer) =

American dancer and television contestant (1989–2025)

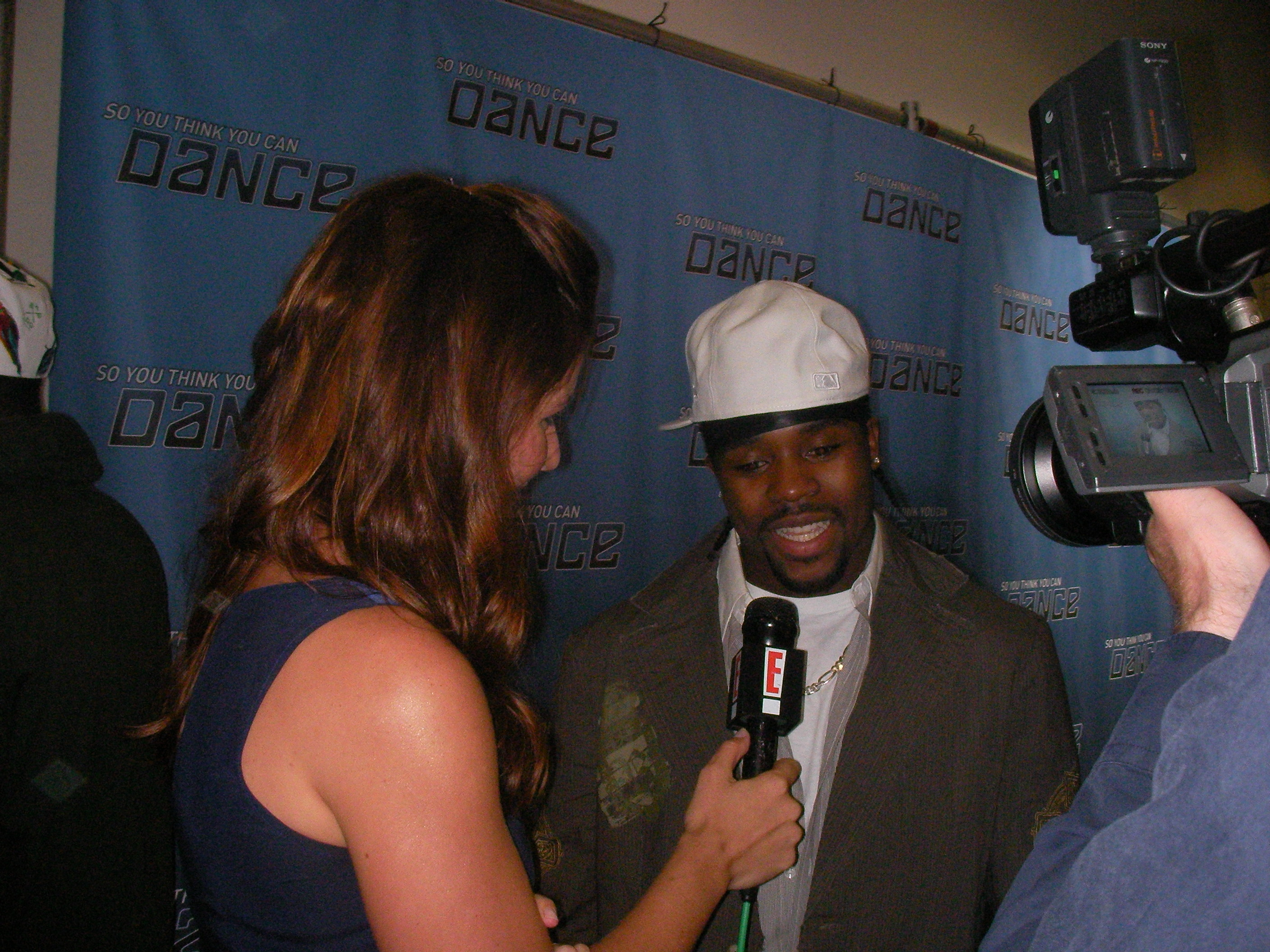
- Born: March 13, 1989; Fort Worth, Texas, U.S.
- Died: September 30, 2025 (aged 36); Fort Worth, Texas, U.S.

Joshua Allen (March 13, 1989 – September 30, 2025) was an American dancer, best known as the winner of the fourth season of So You Think You Can Dance. He had originally auditioned in Dallas, Texas with his friend and fellow contestant, Comfort Fedoke. Allen was announced the winner of the show on August 7, 2008, winning $250,000.

== Early life ==
Allen was born in Fort Worth, Texas, on March 13, 1989. He first started to dance in third grade, at the age of 8. One of his early influences was Michael Jackson, whom Allen emulated by doing the Moonwalk. He also excelled at sports and played football and track. After changing high schools, however, Allen decided to focus on his first love: dance.

== So You Think You Can Dance Season 4 ==
On So You Think You Can Dance, he was paired up with Katee Shean, Courtney Galiano, Chelsie Hightower, and Stephen "tWitch" Boss. Along with Katee, he made the top four without an appearance in the Bottom 3 couples or Bottom 4 contestants. While on the show, Allen did performances in hip-hop, broadway, samba, contemporary, west coast swing, Viennese Waltz, rumba, Argentine tango, disco, lyrical jazz, and jive. Allen performed the first Bollywood dance and trepak of America's So You Think You Can Dance, with Katee and tWitch, respectively.

Allen had some training in different dance styles, including modern, ballet, and jazz. On July 30, 2009, Allen returned, along with fellow Season 4 contestant Chelsie Hightower, to perform their Emmy nominated Argentine Tango, choreographed by Season 2 contestant Dmitry Chaplin.

== Post-SYTYCD ==
As part of his prize for winning SYTYCD Season 4, Allen appeared as a featured dancer in Step Up 3D, along with fellow finalists Katee Shean and Stephen 'tWitch' Boss. He also appeared in the dance comedy Freak Dance. In 2010, Allen took part in Season 2 of Oxygen's Dance Your Ass Off as one of the show's pros. Allen was a featured dancer in the 2011 remake of the musical/movie Footloose. Allen appeared in videos and commercials for Honda, McDonald's, and the US Census. Joshua was featured as a dancer on numerous TV shows, including Community and American Horror Story.

== Personal life and death ==
In July 2016, Allen was indicted for felony assault of his girlfriend and assault with a deadly weapon. Prior to this time, he had been charged with multiple misdemeanor domestic violence counts. He pleaded "no contest" to the charges and was sentenced in August 2017 to one year in county jail.

Allen was found dead after being hit by a train in Fort Worth on September 30, 2025, at the age of 36.

Preceded by Sabra Johnson	Winner of So You Think You Can Dance; 2008	Succeeded by Jeanine Mason
