= Jess King =

Fitness instructor at Peloton

Jessica King
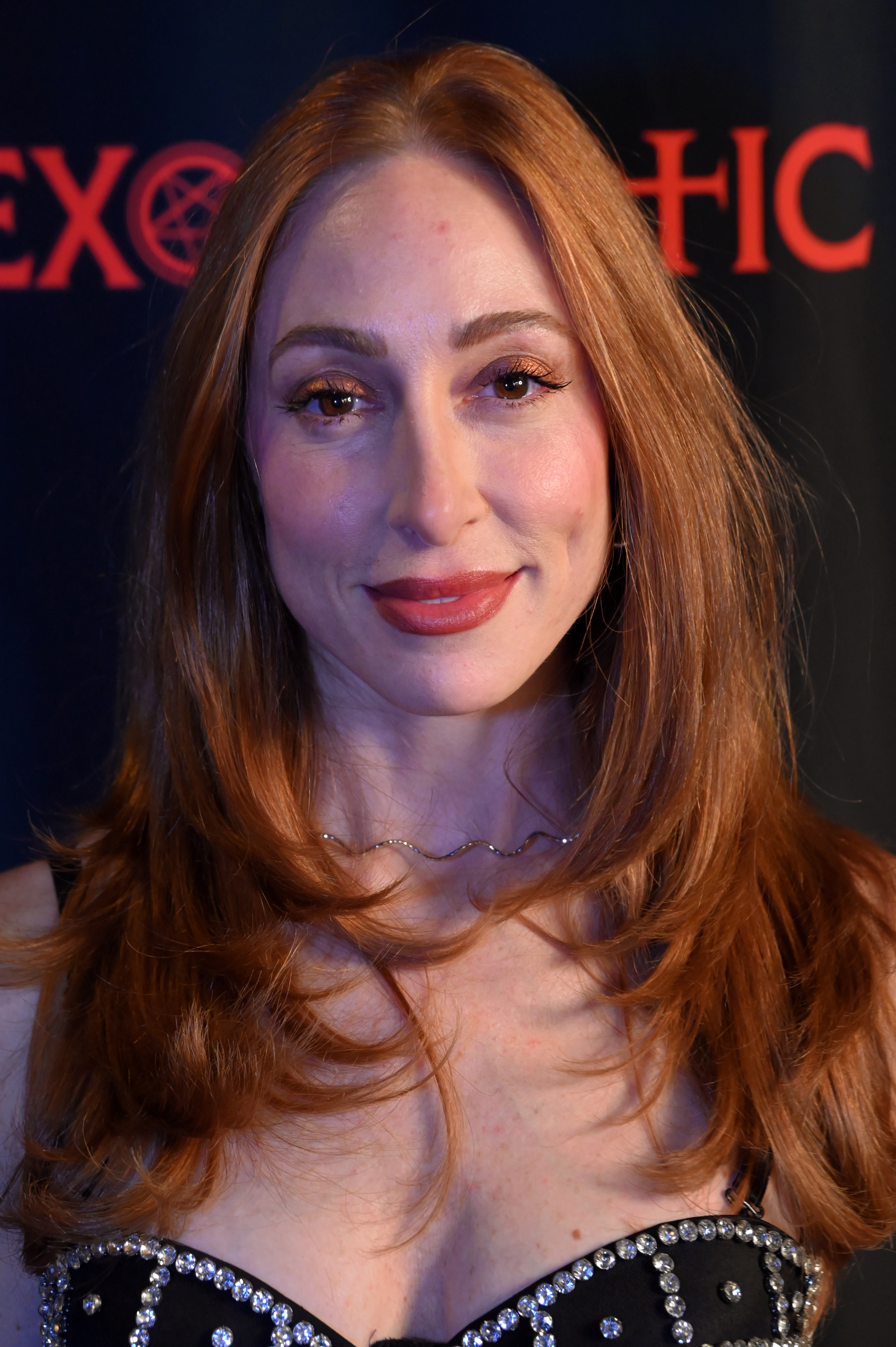
- King in 2025
- Born: 1985 (age 40–41)
- Occupations: Fitness instructor, dancer
- Children: 2

Jessica King, better known as Jess King, is an American dancer and fitness instructor, best known for her classes at the exercise equipment company Peloton.

== Early life and family ==
King was born in 1985 and grew up in Myrtle Beach. She was exposed to fitness from a young age. Her mother, Ximena Bernales, was a competitive bodybuilder and owned boutique fitness studios.

== Career ==
King began her professional career as a dancer. She toured as a dancer and teacher and was the lead in a Cirque Du Soleil production in Las Vegas. In 2008, she was a contestant on So You Think You Can Dance. She was dancing in a show in New York City when the producer suggested she interview with Peloton, a new fitness startup looking for coaches. She accepted an instructor position despite having never been on a spin bike before.

King played the fictitious Peloton instructor "Allegra" in the premier episode of And Just Like That... (the Sex and the City sequel series), in which Mr. Big had a heart attack. Immediately following the TV episode, Jess King starred in a spoof Peloton ad with Mr. Big, produced by Ryan Reynolds.

== Personal life ==
King is in a relationship with Sophia Urista, to whom she got engaged in 2020. In May 2022, the couple announced that King was pregnant with their first child. Their son, Lucien, was born in November 2022. In February 2023, the couple announced that Urista was pregnant with their second child. Their daughter, Afiza Maria Urista King, was born in July 2023, 8 months after her brother.
