= So You Think You Can Dance Australia season 2 =

So You Think You Can Dance Australia
- Season 2
- Hosted by: Natalie Bassingthwaighte
- Judges: Jason Coleman; Matt Lee; Bonnie Lythgoe
- Winner: Talia Fowler
- Runner-up: Charlie Bartley

Release
- Original network: Network Ten
- Original release: 1 February – 26 April 2009

Season chronology
- ← Previous; Season 1 Next → Season 3

Season two of So You Think You Can Dance Australia, the Australian version of the American reality dance-off series So You Think You Can Dance, was hosted by former Rogue Traders vocalist and solo artist Natalie Bassingthwaighte, with Jason Coleman, Matt Lee and Bonnie Lythgoe acting as the judges. It premiered on 1 February 2009. Talia Fowler was announced as the winner on 26 April 2009.

== Auditions ==
Auditions for the second season were held between September and November 2008 in Perth, Brisbane, Melbourne, Adelaide and Sydney. Judges hope that season 2 will see more contestants auditioning after the favourable response to the first season of the show.

== Sydney Round ==
Nigel Lythgoe will make an appearance in this season as a guest judge. He only appeared in the Top 100 week of the auditions. Also, neither Nigel Lythgoe or Bonnie Lythgoe sat next to each other during that stage of auditions due to their divorce in 2007, Wade Robson choreographed their routine during the jazz routine and Season 1 contestants: Jack and Kate were choreographing Pop-Jazz, while Rhys and Demi were choreographing Hip-Hop.

== Studio Shows ==
=== Female Contestants ===
| Contestant | Age | Home Town | Dance Specialty | Elimination date |
|---|---|---|---|---|
| Talia Fowler | 18 | Brisbane, QLD | Ballet | Winner |
| Amy Campbell | 25 | Central Coast, NSW | Lyrical / Contemporary | 3rd Place |
| Katrina "Kat" Risteska | 18 | Sydney, NSW | Hip Hop | 6 April 2009 |
| Penelope “Penny” Higgs | 25 | Melbourne, VIC | Jazz / Cheerleading | Withdrew; 24 March 2009 |
| Gianne Abbott | 28 | Brisbane, QLD | Afro / Samba / Hip Hop | 23 March 2009; Re-entered competition (24 March 2009); 30 March 2009 |
| Nicole "Lamb" Iovine | 24 | Perth, WA | Hip Hop/Jazz | 16 March 2009 |
| Pania Taku | 24 | Sydney, NSW | Hip Hop | 9 March 2009 |
| Chanelle Johnson | 24 | Sydney, NSW | Lyrical / Contemporary | 2 March 2009 |
| Ashlea-Leigh “Ash-Leigh’s Hunter | 25 | Bunbury, WA | Paso Doble | 23 February 2009 |
| Maxine “Max” Francisco | 22 | Sydney, NSW | Hip Hop | 16 February 2009 |

=== Male Contestants ===
| Finalist | Age | Home Town | Dance Specialty | Elimination date |
|---|---|---|---|---|
| Charles “Charlie” Bartley | 19 | Dubbo, New South Wales | Hip-Hop | Runner Up |
| Benjamin “Ben” Veitch | 26 | Gold Coast, QLD | Jazz | 4th Place |
| William "BJ" Rorke | 19 | Sydney, NSW | Contemporary / Jazz / Hip-Hop | 6 April 2009 |
| Tim "Timomatic" Omaji | 21 | Canberra, Australian Capital Territory (originally from Nigeria) | Hip-Hop | 30 March 2009 |
| Loredo Malcolm | 24 | Melbourne, VIC | Contemporary | 23 March 2009 |
| Danny Golding | 25 | Broken Hill, NSW | Contemporary | 16 March 2009 |
| Damien Samuel | 18 | Sydney, NSW | Quickstep | 9 March 2009 |
| Emmanuel Rodriguez | 20 | Orange, NSW | Hip-Hop/B Boy | 2 March 2009 |
| Stephen Tannos | 20 | Sydney, NSW | Contemporary | 23 February 2009 |
| Jesse Rasmussen | 24 | Sydney, NSW | Hip-Hop | 16 February 2009 |

=== Results table ===
Legend
| Female contestant | Male contestant | Bottom 3 couples | Bottom 4 contestants | Eliminated | Withdrew |

| Week: | 2/16 | 2/23 | 3/2 | 3/9 | 3/16 | 3/23 | 3/30 | 4/6 | 4/26 |
| Contestants | Result | | | | | | | | |
| Talia Fowler | | | Btm 3 | | | | | | Winner |
| Charlie Bartley | | | | | | | | | Runner-Up |
| Amy Campbell | Btm 3 | | | Btm 3 | | | | | 3rd Place |
| Ben Veitch | | | | Btm 3 | | | | | 4th Place |
| William "BJ" Rorke | | | Btm 3 | | Btm 3 | | Btm 4 | Elim | |
| Katrina "Kat" Risteska | | | | | Btm 3 | Btm 4 | Btm 4 | Elim | |
| Timothy "Timomatic" Omaji | | Btm 3 | | Btm 3 | Btm 3 | Btm 4 | Elim | | |
| Gianne Abbott | | | Btm 3 | | Btm 3 | Elim* | Elim | | |
| Loredo Malcolm | | Btm 3 | Btm 3 | | | Elim | | | |
| Penny Higgs | | | | | | WD | | | |
| Danny Golding | | | | | Elim | | | | |
| Nicole "Lamb" Iovine | | Btm 3 | | Btm 3 | Elim | | | | |
| Damien Samuel | Btm 3 | | | Elim | | | | | |
| Pania Taku | | | | Elim | | | | | |
| Emmanuel Rodriguez | | | Elim | | | | | | |
| Chanelle Johnson | | Btm 3 | Elim | | | | | | |
| Stephen Tannos | Btm 3 | Elim | | | | | | | |
| Ash-Leigh Hunter | Btm 3 | Elim | | | | | | | |
| Jesse Rasmussen | Elim | | | | | | | | |
| Max Francisco | Elim | | | | | | | | |

- *Penny was forced to leave So You Think You Can Dance. Penny injured her ribs during a lift in her and Ben's top 10 foxtrot and scans on Tuesday revealed that she not only had bruising but a stress fracture. The dancer who will replace Penny is Gianne.

=== Performances ===
Green background means the couple won the "McDonald's I'm lovin it Performance of the Night" for their dance.

=== Week 1 (15 February 2009) ===
Judges: Jason Coleman, Bonnie Lythgoe and Matt Lee

| Couple | Style | Music | Choreographer | Results |
|---|---|---|---|---|
| Pania Taku; Ben Veitch | Contemporary | The Presets - "Talk Like That" | Marko Panzic (season 1) | Safe |
| Talia Fowler; Emmanuel Rodriguez | Cha-Cha | Smoky Joe's Cafe - "Hound Dog" | Jason Gilkison | Safe |
| Lamb Iovine; Timomatic Omaji | Lyrical Hip-Hop | Elisa - "Rainbow" | Travers Ross | Safe |
| Amy Campbell; Damien Samuel | Broadway | Rufus Wainwright - "Puttin' On The Ritz" | Adam Williams | Bottom 3 |
| Ash-Leigh Hunter; Stephen Tannos | Rumba | Celine Dion - "My Heart Will Go On" | Sandro Catalano | Bottom 3 |
| Penny Higgs; Charlie Bartley | Hip-Hop | Beyoncé - "Single Ladies (Put A Ring On It)" | Tiana Joubert | Safe |
| Kat Risteska; Danny Golding | Lyrical | Rebekah Del Rio - "Llorando (Crying)" | Debbie Ellis | Safe |
| Max Francisco; Jesse Rasmussen | Contemporary | MGMT - "Kids" | Shaun Parker | Both Eliminated |
| Gianne Abbot; BJ Rorke | Quickstep | Moulin Rouge! Cast - "Sparkling Diamonds" | Leanne Bampton | Safe |
| Chanelle Johnson; Loredo Malcolm | Jazz | Lady Gaga - "Poker Face" | Project Moda | Safe |

=== Week 2 (22 February 2009) ===
Judges: Jason Coleman, Bonnie Lythgoe, Matt Lee and Jason Gilkison

| Couple | Style | Music | Choreographer | Results |
|---|---|---|---|---|
| Kat Risteska; Danny Golding | Jazz | Katy Perry - "Hot n Cold" | Aleeta Blackburn | Safe |
| Gianne Abbot; BJ Rorke | Contemporary | Natasha Bedingfield - "The Scientist (Live)" | Debbie Ellis Linnert | Safe |
| Lamb Iovine; Timomatic Omaji | Ballroom Latin (Cha-Cha) | Ne-Yo - "Miss Independent" | Michael Glickman | Bottom 3 |
| Ash-Leigh Hunter; Stephen Tannos | Contemporary | Kings of Leon - "Use Somebody" | Marko Panzic (season 1) | Both Eliminated |
| Chanelle Johnson; Loredo Malcolm | Ballroom Latin (Salsa) | Eddie Palmieri - "La Malanga" | Oliver and Luda | Bottom 3 |
| Amy Campbell; Damien Samuel | Hip-Hop | Róisín Murphy - "You Know Me Better" | Travers Ross | Safe |
| Pania Taku; Ben Veitch | Ballroom Latin (Rumba) | Cyndi Lauper - "Walk On By" | Brendan Humphreys | Safe |
| Penny Higgs; Charlie Bartley | Jazz | Gabriella Cilmi - "Don't Wanna Go to Bed Now" | Kelly Aykers | Safe |
| Talia Fowler; Emmanuel Rodriguez | Hip-Hop (Popping) | T-Pain Feat. Chris Brown - "Freeze" | Nacho Pop | Safe |

=== Week 3 (1 March 2009) ===
Judges: Jason Coleman, Bonnie Lythgoe and Matt Lee

| Couple | Style | Music | Choreographer | Results |
|---|---|---|---|---|
| Chanelle Johnson; Loredo Malcolm | Hip Hop | Pussycat Dolls Feat. Snoop Dogg - "Bottle Pop" | Andrew Sears | Johnson Eliminated |
| Penny Higgs; Charlie Bartley | Contemporary | The Fray - "You Found Me" | Kelly Aykers | Safe |
| Gianne Abbot; BJ Rorke | Salsa | Ricky Martin - "Drop It On Me" | Csaba Szirmai | Bottom 3 |
| Kat Risteska; Danny Golding | Contemporary | The White Stripes - "Seven Nation Army" | Marko Panzic (season 1) | Safe |
| Talia Fowler; Emmanuel Rodriguez | Jazz | Hot Shoe Shuffle (Australian Cast) - "This Joint Is Jumpin'" | Adam Williams | Rodriguez Eliminated |
| Amy Campbell; Damien Samuel | Rumba | Duffy - "Stepping Stone" | Jason Gilkison | Safe |
| Pania Taku; Ben Veitch | Krump | Petey Pablo - "Show Me The Money" | Nacho Pop | Safe |
| Lamb Iovine; Timomatic Omaji | Jazz | Kelly Clarkson - "My Life Would Suck Without You" | The Squared Division | Safe |

=== Week 4 (8 March 2009) ===
Judges: Jason Coleman, Bonnie Lythgoe, Matt Lee and Mary Murphy

| Couple | Style | Music | Choreographer | Results |
|---|---|---|---|---|
| Amy Campbell; Damien Samuel | Jazz | Pink - "So What" | Dan Karaty | Samuel Eliminated |
| Lamb Iovine; Timomatic Omaji | Contemporary | Regina Spektor - "Real Love" | Dana Jolly | Bottom 3 |
| Gianne Abbot; BJ Rorke | Hip Hop | Britney Spears - "Toy Soldier" | Tiana Joubert | Safe |
| Penny Higgs; Charlie Bartley | Viennese Waltz | Whitney Houston - "I Have Nothing" | Jason Gilkison | Safe |
| Pania Taku; Ben Veitch | Jazz | Kings of Leon - "Crawl" | Aleeta Blackburn | Taku Eliminated |
| Kat Risteska; Danny Golding | Hip Hop | Smokey Robinson and The Miracles - "The Tears of a Clown (Remix)" | Nacho Pop | Safe |
| Talia Fowler; Loredo Malcolm | Salsa | The Potbelleez - "Trouble Trouble" | Oliver and Luda | Safe |

=== Week 5 (15 March 2009) ===
Judges: Jason Coleman, Bonnie Lythgoe, Matt Lee and Kelley Abbey

| Couple | Style | Music | Choreographer | Results |
|---|---|---|---|---|
| Talia Fowler; Loredo Malcolm | Bollywood | A. R. Rahman Feat. The Pussycat Dolls - "Jai Ho" | Romona Lobo | Safe |
| Talia Fowler; Loredo Malcolm | Jazz | Taylor Swift - "Love Story" | Amé Delves | Safe |
| Kat Risteska; Danny Golding | Contemporary | Eva Cassidy - "Over The Rainbow" | Sarah Boulter | Golding Eliminated |
| Kat Risteska; Danny Golding | Paso Doble | Juno Reactor vs Don Davis - "Burly Brawl" | Aric and Masha | Golding Eliminated |
| Lamb Iovine; Timomatic Omaji | Hip Hop | Keri Hilson Feat. Lil' Wayne - "Turnin' Me On" | Tiana Joubert | Iovine Eliminated |
| Lamb Iovine; Timomatic Omaji | Viennese Waltz | Coldplay - "Sparks" | Leanne Bampton | Iovine Eliminated |
| Gianne Abbot; BJ Rorke | Jive | Metro Station - "Shake It" | Sandro Catalano | Bottom 3 |
| Gianne Abbot; BJ Rorke | Jazz | David Loud & Karen Ziémba - "Arthur In The Afternoon" | Adam Williams | Bottom 3 |
| Penny Higgs; Charlie Bartley | Contemporary | Damien Rice - "Elephant" | Debbie Ellis Linnert | Safe |
| Penny Higgs; Charlie Bartley | Hip Hop | 50 Cent - "Get Up" | Yannus | Safe |
| Amy Campbell; Ben Veitch | Hip Hop | N.E.R.D - "You Know What" | Vince Calingasan | Safe |
| Amy Campbell; Ben Veitch | Mambo | Tito Puente - "Para Los Ramberos" | Fabio Robles | Safe |

=== Week 6 (22 March 2009) ===
Judges: Jason Coleman, Bonnie Lythgoe, and Matt Lee

| Couple | Style | Music | Choreographer | Results |
|---|---|---|---|---|
| Amy Campbell; BJ Rorke | Hip-Hop | Dizzee Rascal feat. Calvin Harris - "Dance Wiv Me" | Etienne Khoo & Kat Molnar | Safe |
| Amy Campbell; BJ Rorke | Contemporary | Beyoncé - "Halo" | Marko Panzic (season 1) | Safe |
| Gianne Abbot; Loredo Malcolm | Contemporary | Sarah Vaughan - "Peter Gunn (Max Begley Remix)" | Sarah Boulter | Both Eliminated |
| Gianne Abbot; Loredo Malcolm | Hip-Hop | Counting Crows - "Mr. Jones" | Travers Ross | Both Eliminated |
| Talia Fowler; Charlie Bartley | Quickstep | Mark Ronson feat. Amy Winehouse - "Valerie" | Jason Gilkison | Safe |
| Talia Fowler; Charlie Bartley | Contemporary | Boys Noize - "The Battery" | Larrissa McGowan | Safe |
| Penny Higgs; Ben Veitch | Jazz | Cast of 'Two on the Aisle' - "If You Hadn't But You Did" | Cameron Mitchell | Higgs withdrew |
| Penny Higgs; Ben Veitch | Foxtrot | Michael Jackson - "Rock with You (Frankie Knuckles Remix)" | Jason Gilkison | Higgs withdrew |
| Kat Risteska; Timomatic Omaji | Samba | The Belle Stars - "Iko Iko" | Sandro Catalano | Bottom 4 |
| Kat Risteska; Timomatic Omaji | Jazz | N.E.R.D - "Kill Joy" | Project Moda | Bottom 4 |

=== Week 7 (29 March 2009) ===
Judges: Jason Coleman, Bonnie Lythgoe, Matt Lee and Jason Gilkison

| Contestant | Style | Music | Choreographer | Results |
|---|---|---|---|---|
| Top 4 Male Contestants | Broadway | Chicago (Soundtrack) - "Roxie's Suite" | Adam Williams | |
| Amy Campbell; Timomatic Omaji | Contemporary | Newton Faulkner - "To The Light" | Sher Manu | Omaji Eliminated |
| Amy Campbell; Timomatic Omaji | Hip-Hop/Broadway | The Wiz (Soundtrack) - "Ease On Down The Road" | Project Moda | Omaji Eliminated |
| Talia Fowler; Ben Veitch | Hip-Hop | Beyoncé - "Diva" | Rosa Agius | Safe |
| Talia Fowler; Ben Veitch | Quick-Step/Samba | Michael Bublé - "It Had Better Be Tonight (Meglio Stasera)" | Natalie Lowe | Safe |
| Gianne Abbot; Charlie Bartley | Disco | Chic - "Le Freak" | Aleeta Blackburn | Abbot Eliminated |
| Gianne Abbot; Charlie Bartley | Hip-Hop | Broadway Project - "The Wobble" | Supple | Abbot Eliminated |
| Kat Risteska; BJ Rorke | Foxtrot | The Godfather (Soundtrack) - "The Godfather Waltz" | Leanne Bampton | Bottom 4 |
| Kat Risteska; BJ Rorke | Jazz | Fatboy Slim - "Wonderful Night" | Sue-Ellen Shook | Bottom 4 |
| Top 4 Female Contestants | Dancehall | Sean Paul - "Watch Dem Roll" | Tiana Joubert | |

Note:According to the So You Think You Can Dance Australia website Penny was forced to leave. Penny injured her ribs during a lift in Sunday night’s foxtrot and scans on Tuesday revealed that she not only had bruising but a stress fracture. Pursuant to the rules, Gianne Abbot, as the last female contestant eliminated, was brought back into the competition. With this, Penny became the first contestant that never had the chance to perform a Solo in the entire run of the series.

=== Week 8 (5 April 2009) ===
Judges: Jason Coleman, Bonnie Lythgoe, Matt Lee

| Contestant | Style | Music | Choreographer | Results |
|---|---|---|---|---|
| Charlie Bartley; BJ Rorke; Ben Veitch | Hip Hop | Mantronix – "King of the Beats" | Supple | |
| Talia Fowler; BJ Rorke | Jazz | Yello – "How How" | Project Moda | Rorke Eliminated |
| Talia Fowler; BJ Rorke | Lyrical Hip Hop | T.I. feat. Justin Timberlake – "Dead and Gone" | Napoleon and Tabitha D'umo | Rorke Eliminated |
| Kat Risteska; Charlie Bartley | Hip Hop | Busta Rhymes feat. Ron Browz – "Arab Money" | Tabitha & Napoleon D'umo | Risteska Eliminated |
| Kat Risteska; Charlie Bartley | Tango | Daniel Bedingfield – "Gotta Get Thru This (Acoustic)" | Jason Gilkison | Risteska Eliminated |
| Amy Campbell; Ben Veitch | Paso Doble | Australian Cast of Jesus Christ Superstar - "Overture" | Jason Gilkison | Safe |
| Amy Campbell; Ben Veitch | Contemporary | Secondhand Serenade – "Fall for You" | Amè Delves | Safe |
| Amy Campbell; Talia Fowler; Kat Risteska | Broadway | Original Broadway Cast of Cabaret – "Wilkommen" | Kelly Aykers | |

=== Week 9: Top 20 Easter Special (12 April 2009) ===
This week was an "Easter Celebration," special performance show. As a result, there was no competing or voting. The Top 20 returned to perform new dances and all previous group dances were shown again. The Top 4 provided commentary on the group dances and the choreographers.

| Contestants | Style | Music | Choreographer |
|---|---|---|---|
| Ash-Leigh Hunter; Damien Samuel | Foxtrot | Christina Aguilera - "Hurt" | Jason Gilkison |
| Gianne Abbot; Timomatic Omaji | Hip Hop | Jean Michel Jarre - "Zoolookologie" | Supple |
| Max Francisco; Stephen Tannos | Broadway Jazz | Donna Summer - "Hot Stuff" | Adam Williams |
| Pania Taku; Emmanuel Rodriguez | Hip Hop | Justin Timberlake - "I'm Lovin' It" | Nacho Pop |
| Chanelle Johnson; Danny Golding | Contemporary | Nina Simone - "O-O-H Child" | Sarah Boulter |
| Gianne Abbot; Loredo Malcolm | Afro Jazz | Zap Mama - "Brrlak!" | Adam Parson |
| Lamb Iovine; Jesse Rasmussen | Hip Hop | Frank Sinatra - "This Town (Mint Royale Remix)" | Supple |
| Kat Risteska; BJ Rorke | Jive | Elvis Presley - "Rubberneckin' (Paul Oakenfold Remix)" | Leanne Bampton |
| Charlie Bartley; Amy Campbell; Talia Fowler; Ben Veitch | Jazz | Britney Spears - "Womanizer" | Matt Lee |

- Guest performers (encores)
  - The Australian Ballet
  - Complexions Contemporary Ballet
- Note: Penny was unable to perform a new routine due to her existing injury and an encore of her week 3 contemporary performance with Charlie was shown.

=== Week 10 (19 April 2009) ===
Judges: Jason Coleman, Bonnie Lythgoe, Matt Lee

| Couple | Style | Music | Choreographer |
|---|---|---|---|
| Top 4 Contestants | Hip Hop | Janet Jackson – "All for You (Video Mix)" | Supple |
| Talia Fowler; Charlie Bartley | Contemporary | Duffy – "Warwick Avenue" | Debbie Ellis Linnert |
| Talia Fowler; Ben Veitch | Argentine Tango | Sarah Vaughan – "Whatever Lola Wants (Gotan Project Remix)" | Fabio Robles |
| Amy Campbell; Ben Veitch | Lyrical Hip Hop | Kanye West - "Coldest Winter" | Travers Ross |
| Amy Campbell; Charlie Bartley | Samba | Sérgio Mendes feat. The Black Eyed Peas – "Mas Que Nada" | Leanne Bampton |
| Charlie Bartley; Ben Veitch | Jazz | Billy Idol - "Dancing with Myself" | Cameron Mitchell |
| Amy Campbell; Talia Fowler | Contemporary | Adam Freeland & Sarah Vaughan - "Fever (Adam Freeland Remix)" | Sarah Boulter |

- Top 4 contestant’s solos

| Contestant | Style | Music | Result |
|---|---|---|---|
| Charlie Bartley | Hip-Hop | Kings of Leon - "Revelry" | Runner-Up |
| Amy Campbell | Contemporary | Miley Cyrus - "The Climb" | 3rd Place |
| Ben Veitch | Jazz | Coldplay - "Viva La Vida" | 4th Place |
| Talia Fowler | Ballet | Rihanna - "Take a Bow" | Winner |

=== Week 1 (16 February 2009) ===
- Group Dance: Ida Corr vs Fedde Le Grand - "Let Me Think About It" (Jazz; Choreographer: Kelley Abbey)
- Guest Dancers: Sydney Dance Company
- Musical Guests: Sam Sparro - "21st Century Life" with Top 20 contestants
- McDonald's i'm lovin' it performance of the night: Penny Higgs & Charlie Bartley
- Solos

| Contestant | Style | Music | Result | | | | |
|---|---|---|---|---|---|---|---|
| Ash-Leigh Hunter | Paso Doble | The Pussycat Dolls - "Perhaps, Perhaps, Perhaps" | Safe | | | | |
| Amy Campbell | Contemporary | The Killers - "Mr. Brightside" | Safe | | | | |
| Max Francisco | Hip-Hop | The Ting Tings - "That's Not My Name" | Eliminated | Stephen Tannos | Contemporary | Camille - "Money Note" | Safe |
| Damien Samuel | Quickstep | The Romantics - "What I Like About You" | Safe | | | | |
| Jesse Rasmussen | Hip-Hop | Justin Timberlake - "Damn Girl" | Eliminated | | | | |

- Eliminated
  - Jesse Rasmussen
  - Max Francisco
- New Pairs
  - None

=== Week 2 (23 February 2009) ===
- Group Dance: Shakira - "Objection (Tango)" (Rock and Roll/Latin Ballroom; Choreographer: Jason Gilkison)
- Guest Performers: Wind of Shaolin
- Musical Guests: Cassie Davis - "Like It Loud"
- McDonald's i'm lovin' it performance of the night: Gianne Abbot & BJ Rorke
- Solos

| Contestant | Style | Music | Result |
|---|---|---|---|
| Lamb Iovine | Jazz | Rihanna - "Rehab" | Safe |
| Chanelle Johnson | Contemporary | Elisa - "Rock Your Soul" | Safe |
| Ash-Leigh Hunter | Paso Doble | Nelly Furtado - "No Hay Igual" | Eliminated |
| Timomatic Omaji | Hip-Hop | N.E.R.D - "She Wants To Move" | Safe |
| Loredo Malcolm | Contemporary | Cirque du Soleil - "Incantation" | Safe |
| Stephen Tannos | Contemporary | Queen - "Bicycle Race" | Eliminated |

- Eliminated
  - Ash-Leigh Hunter
  - Stephen Tannos
- New Pairs
  - None

=== Week 3 (2 March 2009) ===
- Group Dance: Kevin Rudolf ft. Lil Wayne - "Let It Rock" (Hip-Hop; Choreographer: Tiana Joubert)
- Guest Performers: Complexions Contemporary Ballet
- Musical Guests: Lily Allen - "The Fear"
- McDonald's i'm lovin' it performance of the night: Amy Campbell & Damien Samuel
- Solos

| Contestant | Style | Music | Result |
|---|---|---|---|
| Loredo Malcolm | Contemporary | Queen - "The Invisible Man" | Safe |
| BJ Rorke | Contemporary | Brian McKnight - "When you Wanna Come" | Safe |
| Emmanuel Rodriguez | B-boy | Outkast Feat. Killer Mike & Jay-Z - "Flip Flop Rock" | Eliminated |
| Chanelle Johnson | Contemporary | Destiny's Child - "Outro (Amazing Grace)" | Eliminated |
| Gianne Abbot | Samba | Cirque Du Soleil - "Ravendhi" | Safe |
| Talia Fowler | Ballet | Autechre - "Second Bad Vilbel" | Safe |

- Eliminated:
  - Emmanuel Rodriguez
  - Chanelle Johnson
- New Pairs:
  - Talia Fowler & Loredo Malcolm

=== Week 4 (9 March 2009) ===
- Group Dance: James Morrison - "You Make It Real" (Contemporary; Choreographer: Juliette Verne)
- Guest Performers: None
- Musical Guests: Kaz James Feat. Macy Gray - "Can't Hold Back"
- McDonald's i'm lovin' it performance of the night: Talia Fowler & Loredo Malcolm
- Solos

| Contestant | Style | Music | Result |
|---|---|---|---|
| Pania Taku | Hip-Hop | "Three 6 Mafia - "Lolli Lolli" | Eliminated |
| Amy Campbell | Contemporary | Edith Piaf - "Non, je ne regrette rien"" | Safe |
| Lamb Iovine | Jazz | Creed - "With Arms Wide Open" | Safe |
| Ben Veitch | Jazz | Jamie Cullum - "Old Devil Moon" | Safe |
| Damien Samuel | Quickstep | Justin Timberlake - "Let Me Talk To You (prelude)" | Eliminated |
| Timomatic Omaji | Hip-Hop | Michael Jackson - "Human Nature" | Safe |

- Eliminated:
  - Pania Taku
  - Damien Samuel
- New Pairs:
  - Amy Campbell & Ben Veitch

=== Week 5 (16 March 2009) ===
- Group Dance: Gotan Project - "Mi Confesión" (Jazz; Choreographer: Kelley Abbey)
- Guest Performers: Australian Dance Theatre
- Musical Guests: Wes Carr - "Feels Like Woah"
- McDonald's I'm lovin' it performance of the night: Talia Fowler & Loredo Malcolm (Jazz)
- Solos

| Contestant | Style | Music | Result |
|---|---|---|---|
| Timomatic Omaji | Hip-Hop | Freestylers - "Push Up" | Safe |
| BJ Rorke | Hip-Hop | OutKast - "PJ & Rooster" | Safe |
| Danny Golding | Contemporary | Robyn - "With Every Heartbeat" | Safe |
| Lamb Iovine | Jazz | Aretha Franklin - "Respect" | Eliminated |
| Gianne Abbot | Samba | Lauryn Hill - "I Gotta Find Peace of Mind" | Safe |
| Kat Ristreska | Hip-Hop | Keri Hilson - "Energy" | Safe |

- Eliminated:
  - Danny Golding
  - Lamb Iovine
- New Pairs:
  - None. Now that only the top ten remain, new pairs are randomly assigned each week

=== Week 6 (23 March 2009) ===
- Group Dance: Madonna - "Music Inferno" (Disco; Choreographer: Project Moda - Shannon Holtzapffel & Simon Lind)
- Guest Performers: The Australian Ballet
- Musical Guests: The Fray - "You Found Me"
- McDonald's I'm lovin' it performance of the night: Amy Campbell & BJ Rorke (Contemporary)
- Solos

| Contestant | Style | Music | Result |
|---|---|---|---|
| Gianne Abbot | Samba | TBC – TBC | Eliminated |
| Kat Risteska | Hip-Hop | Daft Punk - "Technologic" | Safe |
| Timomatic Omaji | Hip-Hop | Mario - "Let Me Love You" | Safe |
| Loredo Malcolm | Contemporary | TBC – TBC | Eliminated |

- Eliminated:
  - Loredo Malcolm
- Withdrew:
  - Penny Higgs

=== Week 7 (30 March 2009) ===
- Group Dance: Robbie Williams - "Ain't That A Kick In The Head" (Foxtrot; Choreographer: Jason Gilkison)
- Guest Performers: The Australian Ballet
- Musical Guests: Kaiser Chiefs - "Never Miss A Beat"
- McDonald's I'm lovin' it performance of the night: Kat Risteska & BJ Rorke (Ballroom - Foxtrot)
- Solos

| Contestant | Style | Music | Result |
|---|---|---|---|
| Gianne Abbot | Samba | Sergio Mendez - "Magalehna" | Eliminated |
| Kat Risteska | Hip-Hop | T-Pain - "Blow Ya Mind" | Safe |
| BJ Rorke | Contemporary | INXS - "Never Tear Us Apart" | Safe |
| Timomatic Omaji | Hip-Hop | Timbaland - "Bounce" | Safe |

- Eliminated:
  - Gianne Abbot
  - Timomatic Omaji

=== Week 8 (6 April 2009) ===
- Group Dance: Justice - "Genesis"/Daft Punk - "Robot Rock" (Hip Hop; Choreographer: Tabitha & Napoleon)
- Guest Performers: Stomp
- Musical Guests: Duffy - "Rain On Your Parade"
- McDonald's I'm lovin' it performance of the night: Talia Fowler & BJ Rorke (Hip Hop)
- Top 6 contestant’s solo

| Contestant | Style | Music | Result |
|---|---|---|---|
| Kat Risteska | Hip-Hop | Lil' Wayne - "Got Money" | Eliminated |
| Talia Fowler | Ballet | Des'ree - "Kissing You" | Safe |
| Amy Campbell | Contemporary | Yael Naim - "Toxic" | Safe |
| Charlie Bartley | Hip-Hop | The Goo Goo Dolls - "Iris" | Safe |
| BJ Rorke | Jazz | The Ian Carey Project - "Get Shaky" | Eliminated |
| Ben Veitch | Jazz | Beyoncé Knowles - "Broken-Hearted Girl" | Safe |

- Eliminated
  - Kat Risteska
  - BJ Rorke

==== Week 11 Finale (26 April 2009) ====
- Group dances: "Everybody’s Free (To Feel Good)" — Global Deejays (TBC; Choreographers: TBC) with the contestants who auditioned from Season 1 and Season 2
- Musical Guest: "TBC"—TBC
- Judge's choice:
- 4th Place
  - Ben Veitch
- 3rd Place
  - Amy Campbell
- Runner-Up:
  - Charlie Bartley
- Winner:
  - Talia Fowler

== Ratings ==
| Episode | | Original airdate | Viewers | Nightly rank | Weekly Rank |
|---|---|---|---|---|---|
| 1 | Auditions - Part 1: Sydney | 1 February 2009 | 1,306,000 | 5th | 16th |
| 2 | Auditions - Part 2: Brisbane and Perth | 2 February 2009 | 1,154,000 | 8th | 30th |
| 3 | Auditions - Part 3: Melbourne and Adelaide | 4 February 2009 | 1,010,000 | 9th | 42nd |
| 4 | Top 100 - Part 1 | 8 February 2009 | 1,207,000 | 8th | 29th |
| 5 | Top 100 - Part 2 | 9 February 2009 | 1,070,000 | 15th | 39th |
| 6 | The Green Mile | 11 February 2009 | 967,000 | 15th | 51st |
| 7 | Top 20: Performances | 15 February 2009 | 1,373,000 | 5th | 12th |
| 8 | Top 20: Results | 16 February 2009 | 1,024,000 | 13th | 37th |
| 9 | Top 18: Performances | 22 February 2009 | 1,315,000 | 3rd | 12th |
| 10 | Top 18: Results | 23 February 2009 | 1,037,000 | 13th | 38th |
| 11 | Top 16: Performances | 1 March 2009 | 1,296,000 | 4th | 15th |
| 12 | Top 16: Results | 2 March 2009 | 993,000 | 14th | 53rd |
| 13 | Top 14: Performances | 8 March 2009 | 1,150,000 | 6th | 23rd |
| 14 | Top 14: Results | 9 March 2009 | 970,000 | 16th | 54th |
| 15 | Top 12: Performances | 15 March 2009 | 1,292,000 | 6th | 16th |
| 16 | Top 12: Results | 16 March 2009 | 905,000 | 19th | 61st |
| 17 | Top 10: Performances | 22 March 2009 | 1,301,000 | 5th | 15th |
| 18 | Top 10: Results | 23 March 2009 | 960,000 | 16th | 52nd |
| 19 | Top 8: Performances | 29 March 2009 | 1,310,000 | 5th | 19th |
| 20 | Top 8: Results | 30 March 2009 | 1,029,000 | 14th | 48th |
| 21 | Top 6: Performances | 5 April 2009 | 1,274,000 | 5th | 11th |
| 22 | Top 6: Results | 6 April 2009 | 1,125,000 | 11th | 23rd |
| 23 | Top 20 Easter Special | 12 April 2009 | 802,000 | 9th | 66th |
| 24 | Top 4: Performances | 19 April 2009 | 1,149,000 | 9th | 29th |
| 25 | Grand Finale Night | 26 April 2009 | 1,355,000 | 7th | 18th |
| 25 | Grand Finale: Winner Announced | 26 April 2009 | 1,452,000 | 4th | 13th |
