= So You Think You Can Dance Australia season 3 =

So You Think You Can Dance Australia
- Season 3
- Hosted by: Natalie Bassingthwaighte
- Judges: Jason Coleman; Matt Lee; Bonnie Lythgoe
- Winner: Robbie Kmetoni
- Runner-up: Jessie Hesketh

Release
- Original network: Network Ten
- Original release: 31 January – 21 April 2010

Season chronology
- ← Previous; Season 2 Next → Season 4

Season three of So You Think You Can Dance Australia, the Australian version of the American reality dance-off series So You Think You Can Dance, was hosted by former Rogue Traders vocalist and solo artist Natalie Bassingthwaighte, with Jason Coleman, Matt Lee and Bonnie Lythgoe acting as the judges. It premiered on 31 January 2010. Robbie Kmetoni was announced as the winner on 21 April 2010 and the first season that each of the contestants have all been in the bottom six or four. It was the last season of So You Think You Can Dance Australia to air until the show came back in 2014.

== Auditions ==
Auditions for the third season were held between September and October 2009 in Perth, Brisbane, Melbourne, Adelaide and Sydney.

== Sydney Round ==
During the Top 100 week in Sydney. Season 2 contestants: Talia and Charlie were choreographing Jazz, then Amy and Ben were choreographing Ballrom, then Talia and Amy were choreographing Broadway for the female contestants, while Charlie and Ben were choreographing Jazz for the male contestants. Then each contestants perform a solo for their lives, then the judges choose which contestants (both gender: 10 females and 10 males) will be in the live shows as the top 20 contestants.

== Studio Shows ==
=== Female contestants ===
Contestant	Age	Home Town	Dance Specialty	Elimination date
Jessica “Jessie” Hesketh	19	Sydney, NSW	Contemporary	Runner Up
Lauren “Ivy” Heeney	23	Sunbury, VIC	Ballet/Jazz	3rd Place
Jessica “Jess” Stokes	20	Sydney, NSW	Hip-Hop	8 April 2010
Carly Smith	21	Sydney, NSW	Jazz	1 April 2010
Jessica Prince	21	Newcastle, NSW	Waltz	25 March 2010 (withdrew)
Renee Ritchie	20	Hobart, TAS	Jazz	18 March 2010
Isabel “Issi” Durant	18	Sydney, NSW	Contemporary	11 March 2010
Grace Stewart	21	Brisbane, QLD	Contemporary/Jazz	4 March 2010
Mikhaela Gregory	20	Melbourne, VIC	Jazz	25 February 2010
Ilona Fabiszewski	28	Sydney, NSW	Hip-Hop	18 February 2010

=== Male contestants ===
Contestant	Age	Home Town	Dance Specialty	Elimination date
Robbie Kmetoni	18	Sydney, NSW	Contemporary	Winner
Phillipe Witana	30	Brisbane, QLD	Hip-Hop	4th Place
Nickolas “Nick” Geurts	21	Melbourne, VIC	Contemporary	8 April 2010
Kieran McMahon	18	Melbourne, VIC	Foxtrot/Ballet	1 April 2010
Matthew “Matt” Geronimi	22	Sydney, NSW	Salsa	25 March 2010
Heath Keating	22	Mullumbimby, NSW	Contemporary	18 March 2010
Donald “Don” Napalan	25	Sydney, NSW	B-Boying	11 March 2010
Douglas “Doug” De Voogt	23	Perth, WA	Jazz	4 March 2010
Garry “Gaz” Griffiths	25	Gold Coast, QLD	B-Boying	25 February 2010
William “Will” Centurion	31	Sydney, NSW	Argentine Tango	18 February 2010

=== Results table ===
Week:	18/2	25/2	4/3	11/3	18/3	25/3	1/4	8/4	21/4
Contestants	Result								
Robert Kmetoni		Btm 3							Winner
Jessie Hesketh	Btm 3			Btm 3					Runner-Up
Ivy Heeney		Btm 3							3rd Place
Phillipe Witana				Btm 3	Btm 3		Btm 4		4th Place
Nick Geurts	Btm 3		Btm 3		Btm 3			Elim	
Jess Stokes			Btm 3		Btm 3	Elim	Btm 4	Elim	
Kieran McMahon			Btm 3			Btm 4	Elim		
Carly Smith			Btm 3				Elim		
Jessica Prince		Btm 3			Btm 3	Btm 4	WD*		
Matt Geronimi	Btm 3			Btm 3		Elim			
Heath Keating		Btm 3			Elim				
Renee Ritchie				Btm 3	Elim				
Don Napalan				Elim					
Isabella Durant				Elim					
Doug De Voogt			Elim						
Grace Stewart	Btm 3		Elim						
Gaz Griffiths		Elim							
Mikhayla Gregory		Elim							
Will Centurion	Elim								
Ilona Fabiszewski	Elim								

- According to the So You Think You Can Dance Australia website Jessica Prince was forced to leave the competition due to a back injury. Pursuant to the rules, Jess Stokes, as the last female dancer eliminated, was brought back into the competition.

=== Top 20 Showcase (10 February 2010) ===
No voting this week in order to give the contestants the chance to showcase themselves in their own styles

Judges: Jason Coleman, Bonnie Lythgoe and Matt Lee

Contestants	Style	Music	Choreographer
Top 10 Female Contestants	Commercial Jazz	"Sweet Dreams"—Beyoncé	Matt Lee
Don Napalan; Gaz Griffiths	Breakdancing	"Apache"—The Sugarhill Gang	Project Moda
Issi Durant; Robbie Kmetoni	Contemporary	"Samson"—Regina Spektor	Debbie Ellis
Doug De Voogt; Ivy Heeney	Broadway	"Run and Tell That"—Hairspray	Adam Williams
Jessica Prince; Kieran McMahon; Matt Geronimi; Will Centurion	Viennese Waltz	"Never Tear Us Apart"—INXS	Jason Gilkison
Jess Stokes; Illona Fabiszewski; Phillipe Witana	Hip hop	"I Can Transform Ya"—Chris Brown featuring Lil Wayne	Juliette Verne
Nick Geurts; Jessie Hesketh; Heath Keating; Grace Stewart	Contemporary	"Uprising"—Muse	Sarah Boulter
Carly Cooper Smith; Mikhaela Gregory; Renee Ritchie	Jazz	"Tik Tok"—Kesha	Marko Panzic (season 1)
Top 10 Male Contestants	Pop-Jazz	"We Want Your Soul"—Freeland	Jason Coleman

=== Week 1: Top 20 Performance (17 February 2010) ===
Judges: Jason Coleman, Bonnie Lythgoe and Matt Lee

Couple	Style	Music	Choreographer	Results
Ilona Fabiszewski; Nick Geurts	Jazz	"Telephone"—Lady Gaga featuring Beyoncé	Square Division	Fabiszewski Eliminated
Jessie Hesketh; Matt Geronimi	Contemporary	"I'm Kissing You"—Des'ree	Steven Agisilaou	Bottom 3
Jess Stokes; Doug De Voogt	Cha-cha-cha	"Love Long Distance"–Gossip	Leanne Bampton	Safe
Renee Ritchie; Phillipe Witana	Hip hop	"Fallin' Out"—Keyshia Cole	Jesse Rasmussen (season 2)	Safe
Grace Stewart; Will Centurion	Broadway-Jazz	"You Should Be Dancing"—Bee Gees	Adam Williams	Centurion Eliminated
Mikhaela Gregory; Robbie Kmetoni	Rumba	"Endless Love"—Lea Michele & Matthew Morrison	Trent & Gordana	Safe
Carly Cooper Smith; Kieran McMahon	Contemporary	"Furious Angels"—Rob Dougan	Sarah Boulter	Safe
Jessica Prince; Heath Keating	Lyrical-Jazz	"Empire State of Mind (Part II) Broken Down"—Alicia Keys	Marko Panzic (season 1)	Safe
Ivy Heeney; Gaz Griffiths	Pasodoble	"Ojos Asi"—Shakira	Carmelo Pizzino	Safe
Issi Durant; Don Napalan	Hip-hop	"Work"—Ciara featuring Missy Elliott	Juliette Verne	Safe

=== Week 2: Top 18 Performance (24 February 2010) ===
Judges: Jason Coleman, Bonnie Lythgoe, Matt Lee and Jason Gilkison

Couple	Style	Music	Choreographer	Results
Ivy Heeney; Gaz Griffiths	Hip hop	"Down"—Jay Sean	Alvin Decastro	Griffiths Eliminated
Issi Durant; Don Napalan	Foxtrot	"Haven't Met You Yet"—Michael Bublé	Carmelo Pizzino	Safe
Jessica Prince; Heath Keating	Contemporary	"Last Request"—Paolo Nutini	Paul White & Anthony Ikin (season 1)	Bottom 3
Jessie Hesketh; Matt Geronimi	Jazz	"Starstrukk"—3OH!3 feat. Katy Perry	Project Moda	Safe
Mikhaela Gregory; Robbie Kmetoni	Boogaloo	"Don't Push It, Don't Force It"—Leon Haywood	Nacho Pop	Gregory Eliminated
Grace Stewart; Nick Geurts	Contemporary	"Pretty Wings"—Maxwell	Juliette "Jet" Verne	Safe
Carly Cooper Smith; Kieran McMahon	Broadway Jazz	"The Tennis Song" from City of Angels	Cameron Mitchell	Safe
Renee Ritchie; Phillipe Witana	Paso Doble	"Bohemian Rhapsody"—Queen	Leanne Bampton	Safe
Jess Stokes; Douglas DeVoogt	Contemporary	"Fireflies"—Owl City	Ame Delves	Safe

=== Week 3: Top 16 Performance (3 March 2010) ===
Judges: Jason Coleman, Bonnie Lythgoe, Matt Lee and Mary Murphy

Couple	Style	Music	Choreographer	Results
Grace Stewart; Nick Geurts	Dancehall	"Rude Boy"—Rihanna	Tianna Canterbury	Stewart eliminated
Carly Cooper Smith; Kieran McMahon	Waltz	"Hushabye Mountain"—Chitty Chitty Bang Bang	Aric & Masha	Bottom 3
Jess Stokes; Doug De Voogt	Jazz	"My Delirium"—Ladyhawke	Adam Williams	De Voogt eliminated
Renee Ritchie; Phillipe Witana	Contemporary	"Silence"—Selena Cross	Debbie Ellis	Safe
Jessica Prince; Heath Keating	Tango	"Undisclosed Desires"—Muse	Trent & Gordana	Safe
Jessie Hesketh; Matt Geronimi	Hip Hop	"Fortune Teller"—Xavier Rudd	Travers Ross	Safe
Issi Durant; Don Napalan	Contemporary	"Stairway to Heaven"—Led Zeppelin	Sarah Boulter	Safe
Ivy Heeney; Robbie Kmetoni	Jazz	"Bad Romance"—Lady Gaga	Juliette "Jet" Verne	Safe

- Guest Dancers: Sydney Dance Company

=== Week 4: Top 14 Performance (10 March 2010) ===
Judges: Jason Coleman, Bonnie Lythgoe, Matt Lee and Kelley Abbey

Couple	Style	Music	Choreographer	Results
Top 7 Male Contestants	Broadway	"Cool" from West Side Story	Cameron Mitchell	N/A
Issi Durant; Don Napalan	Street Latin/Hip-hop	"Hotel Room Service"— Pitbull	Fabio Robles	Both eliminated
Jessica Prince; Heath Keating	Contemporary	"Daniel"–Joss Stone	Paul Malek	Safe
Ivy Heeney; Robbie Kmetoni	Paso Doble	"Sweet Disposition"—The Temper Trap	Jason Gilkison	Safe
Carly Cooper Smith; Kieran McMahon	Contemporary	"Ne me quitte pas"–Sting	Debbie Ellis	Safe
Jessie Hesketh; Matt Geronimi	Jazz	"Blah Blah Blah"—Ke$ha ft. 3OH!3	The Squared Division	Bottom 3
Renee Ritchie; Phillipe Witana	Waltz	"The Wings" from Brokeback Mountain	Leanne Bampton	Bottom 3
Jess Stokes; Nick Geurts	Hip Hop (Old School)	"U Can't Touch This"—MC Hammer	Tiana Canterbury	Safe
Top 7 Female Contestants	Broadway	"Cell Block Tango" from Chicago	Adam Williams	N/A

=== Week 5: Top 12 Performance (17 March 2010) ===
Judges: Jason Coleman, Bonnie Lythgoe, Matt Lee

Couple	Style	Music	Choreographer	Results
Robbie Kmetoni; Ivy Heeney	Contemporary	"Little Lion Man"—Mumford & Sons	Debbie Ellis	Safe
Robbie Kmetoni; Ivy Heeney	Bollywood	"Bombay"—Timbaland ft. Amar & Jim Beanz	Ramona Lobo	Safe
Heath Keating; Jessica Prince	Broadway	"Supercalifragilisticexpialidocious" from Mary Poppins	Nathan Wright	Keating eliminated
Heath Keating; Jessica Prince	Hip-hop	"Feeling's Gone"—Basement Jaxx ft. Sam Sparro	Etienne Khoo	Keating eliminated
Phillipe Witana; Renee Ritchie	Hip-hop	"I Question Mark"—Wade Robson	Jason Bird; Katie Cesaro	Ritchie eliminated
Phillipe Witana; Renee Ritchie	Rumba	"Today Was a Fairytale"—Taylor Swift	Anya Garnis; Pasha Kovalev	Ritchie eliminated
Nick Geurts; Jess Stokes	Lyrical jazz	"Summertime"—Peter Gabriel	Aleeta Blackburn	Bottom 3
Nick Geurts; Jess Stokes	Jive	"On a Mission"—Gabriella Cilmi	Carmelo Pizzino	Bottom 3
Kieran McMahon; Carly Cooper Smith	Salsa	"Shake It"—The Potbelleez	Luda & Oliver	Safe
Kieran McMahon; Carly Cooper Smith	Hip hop	"Ordinary People"—John Legend	Yannus Sufandi	Safe
Matt Geronimi; Jessie Hesketh	Contemporary	"And No More Shall We Part"—Nick Cave and the Bad Seeds	Ludwig	Safe
Matt Geronimi; Jessie Hesketh	Jazz	"When I Grow Up"—Pussycat Dolls	The Squared Division	Safe

=== Week 6: Top 10 Performance (24 March 2010) ===
Judges: Jason Coleman, Bonnie Lythgoe, Matt Lee, Jason Gilkison

Couple	Style	Music	Choreographer	Results
Matt Geronimi; Carly Cooper Smith	Jazz	"According to You"—Orianthi	Cameron Mitchell	Geronimi eliminated
Matt Geronimi; Carly Cooper Smith	Vogue	"Took the Night"—Chelley	Supple	Geronimi eliminated
Robbie Kmetoni; Jessie Hesketh	Hip-hop	"Talk Show Host"—Radiohead	Jason Bird; Katie Cesaro	Safe
Robbie Kmetoni; Jessie Hesketh	Contemporary	"Heart in a Cage"—The Strokes	Sarah Boulter	Safe
Nick Geurts; Jessica Prince	Contemporary	"Kings & Queens"—Thirty Seconds to Mars	Paul Malek	Prince in bottom 4
Nick Geurts; Jessica Prince	Quickstep	"Under My Skin"—Gin Wigmore	Leeanne Bampton	Prince in bottom 4
Kieran McMahon; Jess Stokes	Samba	"Pop Goes the World"—Gossip	Carmelo Pizzino	McMahon in bottom 4 Stokes eliminated
Kieran McMahon; Jess Stokes	Hip-hop	"Put It in a Love Song"—Alicia Keys feat. Beyoncé Knowles	Juliette "Jet" Verne	McMahon in bottom 4 Stokes eliminated
Phillipe Witana; Ivy Keeney	Contemporary	"Colorblind"—Counting Crows	Sher Manu	Safe
Phillipe Witana; Ivy Keeney	Jazz	"Neutron Dance"—The Pointer Sisters	Project Moda	Safe

=== Week 7: Top 8 Performance (31 March 2010) ===
Judges: Jason Coleman, Bonnie Lythgoe, Matt Lee

Couple	Style	Music	Choreographer	Results
Nick Geurts; Jessie Hesketh	Hip hop	"Nobody"—Ne-Yo	Jesse Rasmussen (season 2)	Both safe
Nick Geurts; Jessie Hesketh	Cha-cha-cha	"Istanbul 1:26 am"—Orient Expressions	Jason Gilkison	Both safe
Kieran McMahon; Jess Stokes	Foxtrot	"Cry Me a River"—Michael Bublé	Trent & Gordana	McMahon eliminated Stokes in bottom 4
Kieran McMahon; Jess Stokes	Contemporary	"Velvet Pants"—Propellerheads	Larissa McGowan	McMahon eliminated Stokes in bottom 4
Phillipe Witana; Carly Cooper Smith	Contemporary	"You've Got the Love"—Florence and the Machine	Rafael Bonacela	Witana in bottom 4 Smith eliminated
Phillipe Witana; Carly Cooper Smith	Jazz	"I Like That"—Richard Vission, Static Revenger and Luciana	Squared Division	Witana in bottom 4 Smith eliminated
Robbie Kmetoni; Ivy Heeney	Broadway	"Mein Herr" from Cabaret	Andrew Hallsworth	Both safe
Robbie Kmetoni; Ivy Heeney	Hip-Hop	"Memories"—David Guetta featuring Kid Cudi	Jason Bird & Katie Cesaro	Both safe

Note: According to the So You Think You Can Dance Australia website Jessica Prince was forced to leave the competition due to a back injury. Pursuant to the rules, Jess Stokes, as the last female dancer eliminated, was brought back into the competition.

=== Week 8: Top 6 Performance (7 April 2010) ===
Judges: Jason Coleman, Bonnie Lythgoe, Matt Lee

Couple	Style	Music	Choreographer	Results
Top 3 Girls	Hip hop	"Freakum Dress"—Beyoncé	Juliette Verne	
Nick Geurts; Ivy Heeney	Contemporary	"The Flower Duet"	Debbie Ellis	Geurts eliminated
Nick Geurts; Ivy Heeney	Lyrical jazz	"Hey Soul Sister"—Train	Paul White; Anthony Akin (season 1)	Geurts eliminated
Robbie Kmetoni; Jess Stokes	Hip hop	"In My Head"—Jason Derülo	Jesse Rasmussen (season 2)	Stokes eliminated
Robbie Kmetoni; Jess Stokes	Jazz	"Heart's A Mess"—Goyte	Project Moda	Stokes eliminated
Phillipe Witana; Jessie Hesketh	Tango	"La Cumparsita"—Gerado Matos Rodriguez'	Fabio Robles	Safe
Phillipe Witana; Jessie Hesketh	Contemporary	"Total Eclipse of the Heart"—Tori Amos	Jason Winters	Safe
Top 3 Boys	Contemporary	"It's a Man's Man's Man's World"—James Brown	Sarah Boulter	

=== Week 9: Top 4 Performance (14 April 2010) ===
Judges: Jason Coleman, Bonnie Lythgoe, Matt Lee and Tyce Diorio

Couple	Style	Music	Choreographer
Jessie Hesketh; Ivy Heeney; Robbie Kmetoni; Phillipe Witana	Jazz	"Steppin to the bad side" —Dreamgirls	Tyce Diorio
Robbie Kmetoni; Ivy Heeney	Rumba	"The Prayer"—Celine Dion & Andrea Bocelli	Aric & Masha
Phillipe Witana; Jessie Hesketh	Jazz	"3 words"—Cheryl Cole feat. will.i.am	Adam Williams
Robbie Kmetoni; Phillipe Witana	Hip-hop	"Take Your Shirt Off"—T-Pain	Tiana Canterbury
Robbie Kmetoni; Jessie Hesketh	Contemporary	"Gathering All the Na'vi Clans for Battle" – Avatar	Jacqui Howard
Phillipe Witana; Ivy Heeney	Contemporary	"Love Lost" – The Temper Trap	Ludwig
Jessie Hesketh; Ivy Heeney	Jazz	"Freak Show"—Britney Spears	Squared Division

- Solos

Contestant	Style	Music	Result
Phillipe Witana	Hip-Hop	"Got to be Real" – Cheryl Lynn	4th Place
Ivy Heeney	Ballet	"Missionary Man" – Eurythmics	3rd Place
Jessie Hesketh	Contemporary	"Nothing Compares 2 U" – Sinéad O'Connor	Runner-Up
Robbie Kmetoni	Contemporary	"Smells Like Teen Spirit" – Nirvana	Winner

=== Week 10 (21 April 2010) ===
- 4th Place
  - Phillipe Witana
- 3rd Place
  - Ivy Heeney
- Runner-Up:
  - Jessie Hesketh
- Winner:
  - Robbie Kmetoni

== Result shows ==
=== Week 1 (18 February 2010) ===
- Group Dance: "Everybody"—Martin Solveig (Jazz; Choreographer: Kelley Abbey)
- Guest Dancers: Bangarra
- Musical Guests: "You Belong with Me"—Taylor Swift
- Solos

Contestant	Style	Music	Result
Jessie Hesketh	Contemporary	"Wild Horses"—Charlotte Martin	Safe
Grace Stewart	Jazz	Frozen"—Madonna	Safe
Ilona Fabiszewski	Hip-Hop	"Ring-a-Ling" —The Black Eyed Peas	Eliminated
Matt Geronimi	Salsa	Don't Stop 'til You Get Enough"—Michael Jackson	Safe
Will Centurion	Argentine Tango	"El Tango de Roxanne"—Moulin Rouge! soundtrack	Eliminated
Nick Geurts	Contemporary	"Be Somebody"—Kings of Leon	Safe

- Eliminated
  - Ilona Fabiszewski
  - Will Centurion
- New Pairs
  - Grace Stewart and Nick Geurts

=== Week 2 (25 February 2010) ===
- Group Dance: "Cinema Italiano"—Kate Hudson (Foxtrot; Choreographer: Jason Gilkison)
- Musical Guests: "Love Long Distance"—Gossip
- Guest Dancers: "Burn for you" – Anya Garnis & Pasha Kovalev
- Solos

Contestant	Style	Music	Result
Jessica Prince	Waltz	"Jungle Drum"—Emilíana Torrini	Safe
Ivy Heeney: "Big Spender (2006 Remix)" —Shirley Bassey	Jazz	Frozen"—Madonna	Safe
Mikhaela Gregory: "Fever"—Cascada	Jazz	"Ring-a-Ling" —The Black Eyed Peas	Eliminated
Heath Keating	Contemporary	"Leave"—Glen Hansard	Safe
Gaz Griffiths	B-Boy	"Beggin' (District 78 mix)"—Madcon	Eliminated
Robbie Kmetoni	Contemporary	”The Cave" -Mumford & Sons	Safe

- Eliminated
  - Mikhaela Gregory
  - Gaz Griffiths
- New Pairs
  - Ivy Heeney and Robbie Kmetoni

=== Week 3 (4 March 2010) ===
- Group Dance: "Fire & Water"—Christine Anu (Contemporary; Choreographer: Stephen Page)
- Musical Guests: "Whataya Want From Me"—Adam Lambert
- Solos

Contestant	Style	Music	Result
Carly Cooper Smith	Jazz	"Heavy Cross"—Gossip	Safe
Grace Stewart	Jazz	"I'm a Slave 4 U"— Britney Spears	Eliminated
Jess Stokes	Hip-Hop	"Question Existing" — Rihanna	Safe
Nick Geurts	Contemporary	”Iris"— The Goo Goo Dolls	Safe
Kieran McMahon	Foxtrot	"What I Like About You" — The Romantics	Safe
Doug De Voogt	Jazz	"Everyday I Love You Less And Less"— Kaiser Chiefs	Eliminated

- Eliminated
  - Grace Stewart
  - Doug De Voogt
- New Pairs
  - Jess Stokes and Nick Guerts

=== Week 4 (11 March 2010) ===
- Group Dance: "Rhythm Nation" – Janet Jackson (Hip hop; Choreographer: Juliette Verne)
- Musical Guests: "When Love Takes Over"—Kelly Rowland
- Solos

Contestant	Style	Music	Result
Renee Ritchie	Jazz	"Walk Away"— Christina Aguilera	Safe
Jessie Hesketh	Contemporary	"Tainted Love" — Marilyn Manson	Safe
Issi Durant	Contemporary	"Buttons" — Sia	Eliminated
Phillipe Witana	Hip-Hop	"SexyBack"— Justin Timberland	Safe
Matt Geronimi	Salsa	"Hey Ya!" — Outkast	Safe
Don Napalan	B-boy	"My Sharona"—The Knack	Eliminated

- Eliminated
  - Issi Durant
  - Don Napalan
- New Partners
  - None

=== Week 5: Top 12 Results (18 March 2010) ===
- Group Dance: 'Serial Thrilla' by The Prodigy (Contemporary; Choreographer: Garry Stewart & Larrisa McGowan)
- Musical Guests: "Good Girls Go Bad"—Cobra Starship
- Solos

Contestant	Style	Music	Result
Jess Stokes	Hip-Hop	"Like A Drug"— Kylie Minogue	Safe
Jessica Prince	Waltz	"Malagueña" — Brian Setzer	Safe
Renee Ritchie	Jazz	"You'll Find A Way (remix)"—Santigold	Eliminated
Nick Geurts	Contemporary	"For Your Entertainment"— Adam Lambert	Safe
Heath Keating	Contemporary	"Where the City Meets the Sea" — The Getaway Plan	Eliminated
Phillipe Witana	Hip-Hop	The Circle of Life — Carmen Twillie & Lebo M	Safe

- Eliminated
  - Renee Ritchie
  - Heath Keating
- New Partners
  - None, Now that only ten contestants remaining, new pairs are randomly assigned each week. They'll also be voted individually.

=== Week 6: Top 10 Results (25 March 2010) ===
- Group Dance: "Tanguera" by Mariano Mores (Tango; Choreographer: Jason Gilkison)
- Musical Guests: "Blah Blah Blah"—Ke$ha
- Solos

Contestant	Style	Music	Result
Jess Stokes	Hip-Hop	"Like The Sea" – Alicia Keys	Eliminated
Jessica Prince	Waltz	"You're the Boss" — Ann-Margret & Elvis Presley	Safe
Matt Geremoni	Salsa	"Use Somebody"— Kings of Leon	Eliminated
Kieran McMahon	Foxtrot	"Tango De Los Asesinos (Assassin’s Tango)" — John Powell from Mr. & Mrs. Smith	Safe

- Eliminated
  - Jess Stokes
  - Matt Geronimi

=== Week 7: Top 8 Results (1 April 2010) ===
- Group Dance: "Breathe Me" by Sia (Contemporary; Choreographer: Debbie Ellis)
- Musical Guests: "On a Mission" – Gabriella Cilmi
- Guest Dancers: Chunky Move
- Solos

Contestant	Style	Music	Result
Jess Stokes	Hip-Hop	"Shy" – Ani Difranco	Safe
Carly Cooper Smith	Jazz	"You're the Boss" — "Cold Case Love" – Rihanna	Eliminated
Phillipe Witana	Hip-Hop	"Gone" – N'Sync	Safe
Kieran McMahon	Foxtrot	"Into The Night" – Santana	Eliminated

- Eliminated
  - Carly Cooper Smith
  - Kieran McMahon

=== Week 8: Top 6 Results (8 April 2010) ===
- Group Dance: "Push Up" by Freestylers (Hip Hop; Choreographer: Supple)
- Musical Guests: "In My Head" – Jason Derülo
- Guest Dancers: Sydney Dance Company
- Solos

Contestant	Style	Music	Result
Ivy Heeney	Ballet	Santigold - Rihanna	Safe
Jess Stokes	Hip-Hop	Hide and Seek – Imogen Heap	Eliminated
Jessie Hesketh	Contemporary	Your House – Alanis Morissette	Safe
Nick Geurts	Contemporary	Faint – Linkin Park	Eliminated
Robbie Kmetoni	Contemporary	Joker and the Thief – Wolfmother	Safe
Phillipe Witana	Hip-Hop	Smooth Criminal – Michael Jackson	Safe

- Eliminated
  - Jess Stokes
  - Nick Geurts
