= So You Think You Can Dance Australia season 1 =

So You Think You Can Dance Australia
- Season 1
- Hosted by: Natalie Bassingthwaighte
- Judges: Jason Coleman; Matt Lee; Bonnie Lythgoe
- Winner: Jack Chambers
- Runner-up: Rhys Bobridge

Release
- Original network: Network Ten
- Original release: 3 February – 27 April 2008

Season chronology
- Next → Season 2

Season one of So You Think You Can Dance Australia, the Australian version of the American reality dance-off series So You Think You Can Dance, was hosted by Rogue Traders vocalist Natalie Bassingthwaighte, with Jason Coleman, Matt Lee and Bonnie Lythgoe acting as the judges. The series began airing on Sunday 3 February 2008 at 7.30 pm and continued on Sundays and Mondays until the final on 27 April 2008. Jack Chambers was the inaugural winner of So You Think You Can Dance Australia 2008 taking home $200,000. Chambers and fellow grand finalist Demi Sorono, who were paired as a couple from the first performance episode, became the third contestants in the show's run never to face elimination from being among the bottom six or bottom four contestants, became the third contestants to be in the grand finale, and became the first pair in the show's run never to face elimination from being among the bottom four contestants in the grand finale and became the second original couple who were the final two and the second season that the top four were never in the danger zone.

== Auditions ==
From October to November 2007, auditions for contestants were held in Perth, Brisbane, Melbourne, Adelaide and Sydney. After being selected, through either an impressive initial audition or after a choreography workshop.

== Sydney Round ==
the top 100 contestants spent a week in Sydney for more auditions, ultimately forming top 20, (both gender: 10 female contestants and 10 male contestants). A 600-seat arena was constructed in Sydney for the live shows.

Several contestants later performed during the 2007 Australian Idol grand final, as well as Ten's New Year's Eve broadcast.

The song played after each female contestants and male contestants elimination differs each week.

== Studio Shows ==
=== Top 20 Contestants ===
From over 3000 contestants, 20 contestants (each gender: 10 females and 10 males) were chosen to compete in the elimination series, which began on 17 February 2008.

=== Female Contestants ===
| Contestant | Age | Home Town | Dance Specialty | Elimination date |
|---|---|---|---|---|
| Kate Wormald | 29 | Sydney, NSW | Jazz dance, Commercial, ballet | 3rd Place |
| Demi Sorono | 28 | Melbourne, VIC | B-girl | 4th place |
| Vanessa Sew Hoy | 22 | Sydney, NSW | Ballet, Contemporary Jazz | 14 April 2008 |
| Rhiannon Villareal | 19 | Sydney, NSW | Jazz, Hip-Hop | 7 April 2008 |
| Jemma Armstrong | 20 | Perth, WA | Foxtrot | 31 March 2008 |
| Camilla Jakimowicz | 25 | Ipswich, QLD | Jazz | 17 March 2008 |
| Laura Brougham | 20 | Adelaide, SA | Jazz | 10 March 2008 |
| Stephanie Golman | 18 | Sydney, NSW | Samba | 3 March 2008 |
| Kassandra "Kassy" Lee | 21 | Sydney, NSW | Hip-Hop | 25 February 2008 |
| Courtney Walter | 23 | Melbourne, VIC | Jazz, Commercial | 18 February 2008 |

=== Male Contestants ===
| Contestant | Age | Home Town | Dance Specialty | Elimination date |
|---|---|---|---|---|
| Jack Chambers | 19 | Brisbane, QLD | Broadway, Funk, Hip-Hop | Winner |
| Rhys Bobridge | 26 | Melbourne, VIC | Contemporary Jazz | Runner-up |
| Graeme Isaako | 18 | Sydney, NSW | Lyrical Jazz | 14 April 2008 |
| Henry Byalikov | 22 | Sydney, NSW | Cha-cha-cha | 7 April 2008 |
| Anthony Ikin | 26 | Gold Coast, QLD | Acrobatic, Contemporary Jazz | 31 March 2008 |
| Joel "JD" De Carteret | 26 | Melbourne, VIC | Hip-Hop | 17 March 2008 |
| Sermsah Bin Saad | 31 | Port Hedland, WA | Traditional Aboriginal, Contemporary | 10 March 2008 |
| Marko Panzic | 23 | Perth, WA | Contemporary Jazz | 3 March 2008 |
| Hilton Denis | 18 | Sydney, NSW | Contemporary/Hip-Hop, Hybrid | 25 February 2008 |
| Khaly Ngeth | 19 | Sydney, NSW | B-Boying | 18 February 2008 |

=== Results table ===
Legend
| Female contestant | Male contestant | Bottom 3 couples | Bottom 4 contestants | Eliminated |

| Week: | 2/18 | 2/25 | 3/3 | 3/10 | 3/17 | 3/31 | 4/7 | 4/14 | 4/21 |
| Contestant | Result | | | | | | | | |
| Jack Chambers | | | | | | | | | **Winner** |
| Rhys Bobridge | | | | | | | | | **Runner-up** |
| Kate Wormald | Btm 3 | Btm 3 | | | Btm 3 | | | | **3rd Place** |
| Demi Sorono | | | | | | | | | **4th place** |
| Graeme Isaako | | Btm 3 | | | Btm 3 | Btm 4 | Btm 4 | **Elim** | |
| Vanessa Sew Hoy | Btm 3 | | Btm 3 | | | | Btm 4 | **Elim** | |
| Henry Byalikov | Btm 3 | | Btm 3 | | | | **Elim** | | |
| Rhiannon Villareal | | Btm 3 | | Btm 3 | Btm 3 | Btm 4 | **Elim** | | |
| Anthony Ikin | | | Btm 3 | Btm 3 | Btm 3 | **Elim** | | | |
| Jemma Armstrong | | | | | | **Elim** | | | |
| Joel "JD" De Carteret | | Btm 3 | | Btm 3 | **Elim** | | | | |
| Camilla Jakimowicz | | | | Btm 3 | **Elim** | | | | |
| Sermsah Bin Saad | | | | **Elim** | | | | | |
| Laura Brougham | | | Btm 3 | **Elim** | | | | | |
| Marko Panzic | | | **Elim** | | | | | | |
| Stephanie Golman | | | **Elim** | | | | | | |
| Hilton Denis | Btm 3 | **Elim** | | | | | | | |
| Kassandra "Kassy" Lee | | **Elim** | | | | | | | |
| Khaly Ngeth | **Elim** | | | | | | | | |
| Courtney Walter | **Elim** | | | | | | | | |

=== Performance shows ===
Green background means the couple won the "Cadbury Flake Breathtaking Moment" for their dance.

=== Week 1 (17 February 2008) ===
Judges: Jason Coleman, Bonnie Lythgoe and Matt Lee

| Couple | Style | Music | Choreographer | Results |
|---|---|---|---|---|
| Rhiannon Villareal; Joel De Carteret "JD" | Hip-hop | "Kiss, Kiss"—Chris Brown | Manuela Oliveira | Safe |
| Courtney Walter; Hilton Denis | Jazz Lyrical | "Exit Music"—Radiohead | Kelly Aykers | Walter Eliminated |
| Vanessa Sew Hoy; Henry Byalikov | Salsa | "Don't Hold Back"—The Potbelleez | Luda and Oliver | Bottom 3 |
| Camilla Jakimowicz; Sermsah Bin Saad | Musical Theatre | "Big Spender"—Shirley Bassey | Adam Williams | Safe |
| Jemma Armstrong; Rhys Bobridge | Waltz | "A New Day Has Come" from Celine Dion | Jason Gilkison | Safe |
| Laura Brougham; Anthony Ikin | Contemporary Lyrical | "Nobody Knows"—Pink | Juliette "Jet" Verne | Safe |
| Stephanie Golman; Marko Panzic | Jive | "Untouched"—The Veronicas | Jason Gilkison | Safe |
| Kate Wormald; Khaly Ngeth | Contemporary Jazz | "If You Keep Losing Sleep"—Silverchair | Sally Clark | Ngeth Eliminated |
| Demi Sorono; Jack Chambers | Boogaloo | "Flashlight"—Parliament | Nacho Pop | Safe |
| Kassandra "Kassy" Lee; Graeme Isaako | Lyrical Hip Hop | "Bleeding Love"—Leona Lewis | Yannus Sufandi | Safe |

=== Week 2 (24 February 2008) ===
Judges: Jason Coleman, Bonnie Lythgoe and Matt Lee

| Couple | Style | Music | Choreographer | Results |
|---|---|---|---|---|
| Kate Wormald; Hilton Denis | Foxtrot | "2 Hearts"—Kylie Minogue | Jason Gilkison | Denis Eliminated |
| Camilla Jakimowicz; Sermsah Bin Saad | Hip Hop | "Water"—Ying Yang Twins | Phillip Haddad | Safe |
| Kassandra "Kassy" Lee; Graeme Isaako | Contemporary Lyrical | " Yesterday"—Ray Charles | Sarah Boulter | Lee Eliminated |
| Stephanie Golman; Marko Panzic | Swap (Swing & Hip hop) | "Are You The One?"—The Presets | Rose Edwards | Safe |
| Laura Brougham; Anthony Ikin | Disco | "Boogie Wonderland"—Earth, Wind, and Fire ft. The Emotions | Aleeta Blackburn | Safe |
| Rhiannon Villareal; Joel De Carteret "JD" | Contemporary Jazz | "Breathe"—The Prodigy | Kelly Aykers | Bottom 3 |
| Demi Sorono; Jack Chambers | Samba | "Gasolina"—Daddy Yankee | Paul Green | Safe |
| Jemma Armstrong; Rhys Bobridge | Contemporary Jazz | "Need You Tonight"-INXS | Michael Boyd | Safe |
| Vanessa Sew Hoy; Henry Byalikov | Animation Hip Hop | "Ghost in the Machine"—Future Fame | Nacho Pop | Safe |

=== Week 3 (2 March 2008) ===
Judges: Jason Coleman, Bonnie Lythgoe, Matt Lee and Mary Murphy.

| Couple | Style | Music | Choreographer | Results |
|---|---|---|---|---|
| Demi Sorono; Jack Chambers | Jazz | "Brianstorm" by Arctic Monkeys | Kelly Aykers | Safe |
| Vanessa Sew Hoy; Henry Byalikov | Contemporary Disco | "Manteca" by Dizzy Gillespie | Sarah Boulter | Bottom 3 |
| Camilla Jakimowicz; Sermsah Bin Saad | Contemporary | "Swift Sword" from the film Hero | Shannon Holtzapffel and Simon Lind (Project Moda) | Safe |
| Jemma Armstrong; Rhys Bobridge | Paso Doble | "O Verona" from the film Romeo + Juliet | Jason Gilkison | Safe |
| Stephanie Golman; Marko Panzic | Krump | "Gorilla Militia" by Bliss n Eso | Travers Ross | Both Eliminated |
| Laura Brougham; Anthony Ikin | Soul Swing | "Idlewild Blues" by OutKast | Michael Boyd | Bottom 3 |
| Rhiannon Villareal; Joel De Carteret "JD" | Tango | "Santa María (del Buen Ayre)" by Gotan Project | Fabio Robles | Safe |
| Kate Wormald; Graeme Isaako | Bollywood | "Work (Freemasons Remix)" by Kelly Rowland | Farah Shah | Safe |

=== Week 4 (9 March 2008) ===
Judges: Jason Coleman, Bonnie Lythgoe and Matt Lee.

| Couple | Style | Music | Choreographer | Results |
|---|---|---|---|---|
| Jemma Armstrong; Rhys Bobridge | Hip-Hop | "Break It Off"—Rihanna featuring Sean Paul | Tiana Joubert | Safe |
| Demi Sorono; Jack Chambers | Rumba | "Father Figure"—George Michael | Paul Green | Safe |
| Laura Brougham; Anthony Ikin | Contemporary | "Hot"—Avril Lavigne | Yannus Sufandi | Brougham eliminated |
| Camilla Jakimowicz; Sermsah Bin Saad | Hip-Hop | "The Way I Are"—Timbaland | Travers Ross | Bin Saad Eliminated |
| Vanessa Sew Hoy; Henry Byalikov | African Samba | "Lo-Lo Dzama"—Sum Svisti | Jason Gilkison | Safe |
| Kate Wormald; Graeme Isaako | Contemporary | "Fix You"—Coldplay | Debbie Ellis Linnert | Safe |
| Rhiannon Villareal; Joel De Carteret | Jazz | "Somebody Told Me"—The Killers | Adam Williams | Bottom 3 |

=== Week 5 (16 March 2008) ===
This week's episode featured guest judge Kelley Abbey.

This episode had each pair performing two routines; one by a professional choreographer, the other by their own conception, the latter being called the "Surprise Challenge". This involved the dances choosing out of three songs (the one they chose being in bold) and three costumes, then creating their unique routine.

| Couple | Style | Music | Choreographer | Results |
|---|---|---|---|---|
| Kate Wormald; Graeme Isaako | Jazz | "Live and Let Die"—Guns N' Roses | Leah Howard | Bottom 3 |
| Kate Wormald; Graeme Isaako | Hip Hop | "Pump It" by The Black Eyed Peas | Kate Wormald; Graeme Isaako | Bottom 3 |
| Rhiannon Villareal; Joel De Carteret | Hip Hop | "What's Your Flava?" by Craig David | Nacho Pop | De Carteret eliminated |
| Rhiannon Villareal; Joel De Carteret | Swing | "Big Girl (You Are Beautiful)" by Mika | Rhiannon Villareal; Joel De Carteret | De Carteret eliminated |
| Jemma Armstrong; Rhys Bobridge | Musical Theatre | "Dancin' Fool"—Barry Manilow from Copacabana | Andrew Hallsworth | Safe |
| Jemma Armstrong; Rhys Bobridge | Jazz | "Pony"—Ginuwine | Jemma Armstrong; Rhys Bobridge | Safe |
| Vanessa Sew Hoy; Henry Byalikov | Capoeira-influenced; Contemporary | "Piece of Me"—Britney Spears | Josival Bispo; Chris Ladera | Safe |
| Vanessa Sew Hoy; Henry Byalikov | Cha-cha-cha | "Black or White"—Michael Jackson | Vanessa Sew Hoy; Henry Byalikov | Safe |
| Camilla Jakimowicz; Anthony Ikin | Lambada | "Not in Love"—Enrique Iglesias featuring Kelis | Fabio Robles | Jakimowicz eliminated |
| Camilla Jakimowicz; Anthony Ikin | Theatrical | "Stronger"—Kanye West | Camilla Jakimowicz; Anthony Ikin | Jakimowicz eliminated |
| Demi Sorono; Jack Chambers | Contemporary | "Ch-Check It Out" by Beastie Boys | Garry Stewart | Safe |
| Demi Sorono; Jack Chambers | Hip Hop | "Crazy in Love"—Beyoncé Knowles | Demi Sorono; Jack Chambers | Safe |

=== Week 6 (30 March 2008) ===
This week also featured a solo routine performed by each dancer, based on music from a film.

| Couple | Style | Music | Choreographer | Results |
|---|---|---|---|---|
| Rhiannon Villareal; Henry Byalikov | Jazz | "Fragile"—Sting | Kelley Abbey | Villareal in Bottom 4 |
| Vanessa Sew Hoy; Jack Chambers | Lyrical Contemporary | "Kiss from a Rose"—Seal | Juliette "Jet" Verne | Safe |
| Kate Wormald; Rhys Bobridge | Hip-hop | "Give It to Me"—Timbaland | Supple | Safe |
| Demi Sorono; Graeme Isaako | Contemporary | "Reptilia"—The Strokes | Sarah Boulter | Isaako in Bottom 4 |
| Anthony Ikin; Jemma Armstrong | Cha-cha-cha | "Kiss"—Tom Jones | Paul Green | Both eliminated |

Top 10 contestant’s solos:

| Contestant | Style | Music | Choreographer | Results |
|---|---|---|---|---|
| Henry Byalikov | Paso Doble | "Come and Get Them" from the film 300 | Paul Green | Safe |
| Rhiannon Villareal | Hip Hop | "1 Thing"—Amerie from the film Hitch | Nacho Pop | Bottom 4 |
| Anthony Ikin | Contemporary | "The Blower's Daughter"—Damien Rice from the film Closer | Kelly Aykers | Eliminated |
| Jemma Armstrong | Jive | "Shake a Tail Feather"—Ray Charles from the film The Blues Brothers | Paul Green | Eliminated |
| Vanessa Sew Hoy | Contemporary | "How Do I Live"—Trisha Yearwood from the film Con Air | Kelly Aykers | Safe |
| Jack Chambers | Jazz | Theme from Mission: Impossible | Kelly Aykers | Safe |
| Kate Wormald | Jazz | "Queen of the Night"—Whitney Houston from the film The Bodyguard | Kelly Aykers | Safe |
| Rhys Bobridge | Hip Hop | "Born Slippy .NUXX"—Underworld from the film Trainspotting | Nacho Pop | Safe |
| Graeme Isaako | Jazz | "Bohemian Rhapsody"—Queen from the film Wayne's World | Kelly Aykers | Bottom 4 |
| Demi Sorono | Hip Hop | "Get Up (I Feel Like Being a) Sex Machine"—James Brown from the film Legally Blonde | Nacho Pop | Safe |

=== Week 7 (6 April 2008) ===
| Couple | Style | Music | Choreographer | Results |
|---|---|---|---|---|
| Vanessa Sew Hoy; Rhys Bobridge | Hip Hop | "Tambourine"—Eve | Supple | Sew Hoy in Bottom 4 |
| Vanessa Sew Hoy; Rhys Bobridge | Broadway | "America" from West Side Story | Andrew Hallsworth | Sew Hoy in Bottom 4 |
| Kate Wormald; Jack Chambers | Quickstep | "Spider-Man Theme"—Michael Bublé | Leanne Bampton | Safe |
| Kate Wormald; Jack Chambers | Hip-hop | "Singin' In the Rain" by Mint Royale | Supple | Safe |
| Demi Sorono; Henry Byalikov | House | "Just Fine"—Mary J. Blige | Project Moda | Byalikov eliminated |
| Demi Sorono; Henry Byalikov | Contemporary | "Nine in the Afternoon"—Panic! at the Disco | Kelly Aykers | Byalikov eliminated |
| Rhiannon Villareal; Graeme Isaako | Burlesque | "Sweet Dreams (Are Made of This)" by Mika | Aleeta Blackburn | Villareal eliminated Isaako in Bottom 4 |
| Rhiannon Villareal; Graeme Isaako | Jazz Funk Hip Hop | "4 Minutes" by Madonna | Juliette "Jet" Verne | Villareal eliminated Isaako in Bottom 4 |

=== Week 8 (13 April 2008) ===
In the live results shows, since Bonnie Lythgoe wasn't able to attend, Jason Gilkinson took over her spot on that night.

| Couple | Style | Music | Choreographer | Results |
|---|---|---|---|---|
| Kate Wormald; Rhys Bobridge | Rumba | "Message to My Girl"—Split Enz | Jason Gilkison | Safe |
| Demi Sorono; Jack Chambers | Contemporary | "Strict Machine"—Goldfrapp | Garry Stewart | Safe |
| Vanessa Sew Hoy; Graeme Isaako | Broadway | "The Money Song" from Cabaret | Adam Williams | Both eliminated |
| Top 3 Female Contestants | Hip Hop | "California Love"—2Pac | Nacho Pop | |
| Top 3 Male Contestants | Contemporary Hip Hop | "Hurt Sumthin"—Missy Elliott | Supple | |

=== Week 9 (20 April 2008) ===
| Couple | Style | Music | Choreographer |
|---|---|---|---|
| Demi Sorono; Jack Chambers | Cha-cha-cha | "Mercy"—Duffy | Jason Gilkison |
| Kate Wormald; Rhys Bobridge | Hip-hop | "There It Go"—Juelz Santana | Supple |
| Demi Sorono; Rhys Bobridge | Contemporary | "Chasing Cars"—Snow Patrol | Debbie Ellis |
| Kate Wormald; Jack Chambers | Lyrical Jazz | "No One"—Alicia Keys | Juliette "Jet" Verne |
| Demi Sorono; Kate Wormald | Hip-hop | "Rondo Alla Turca"—Wolfgang Amadeus Mozart | Supple |
| Rhys Bobridge; Jack Chambers | Broadway | "Overture"/"All That Jazz" from Chicago | Adam Williams |
| Top 4 Contestants | Hip-hop | "Impacto" By Daddy Yankee | Tiana Joubert |

=== Week 1 (18 February 2008) ===
- Group dance: "LoveStoned"—Justin Timberlake (Jazz; Choreographer: Kelley Abbey
- Musical Guest: "Untouched"—The Veronicas
- Solos:

| Contestant | Style | Music | Results |
|---|---|---|---|
| Courtney Walter | Jazz | | Eliminated |
| Hilton Denis | Jazz | "Flaunt It"—TV Rock | Safe |
| Vanessa Sew Hoy | Ballet | "Fields of Gold"—Eva Cassidy | Safe |
| Henry Byalikov | Cha-cha-cha | "Smooth"—Santana feat. Rob Thomas | Safe |
| Kate Wormald | Jazz | "He's a Dream"—Shandi | Safe |
| Khaly Ngeth | B-boying | "It's Like That"—Run–D.M.C. | Eliminated |

- Eliminated:

- Courtney Walter
- Khaly Ngeth

- New Pairs:

- Kate Wormald
- Hilton Denis

=== Week 2 (25 February 2008) ===
- Group dance: "Wanna Be Startin' Something"—Michael Jackson (Hip-hop; Choreographer: Matt Lee)
- Musical guest: "Soul Man"—Guy Sebastian
- Solos:

| Contestant | Style | Music | Results |
|---|---|---|---|
| Kassy Lee | Hip-hop | "Baby Got Back"—Sir Mix-a-Lot | Eliminated |
| Graeme Isaako | Jazz | | Safe |
| Kate Wormald | Jazz | "Call Me When You're Sober"—Evanescence | Safe |
| Hilton Denis | Contemporary | "Breathe Me"—Sia | Eliminated |
| Rhiannon Villareal | Hip-hop | "PYT (Pretty Young Thing)"—Michael Jackson | Safe |
| Joel De Carteret | Hip-hop | "What Goes Around... Comes Around"—Justin Timberlake | Safe |

- Eliminated:

- Kassy Lee
- Hilton Denis

- New Pairs:

- Kate Wormald
- Graeme Isaako

=== Week 3 (3 March 2008) ===
- Group dance: "Sing, Sing, Sing (With a Swing)"—Louis Prima (Ballroom; Choreographer: Jason Gilkison)
- Musical Guest: "Say It Again"—Scribe feat. Tyra Hammond
- Solos:

| Contestant | Style | Music | Results |
|---|---|---|---|
| Laura Brougham | Jazz | "Never Again"—Kelly Clarkson | Safe |
| Anthony Ikin | Contemporary | "Are You Gonna Go My Way"—Lenny Kravitz | Safe |
| Stephanie Golman | Samba | "Hey Mama"—The Black Eyed Peas | Eliminated |
| Marko Panzic | Contemporary | "I Surrender"—Celine Dion | Eliminated |
| Vanessa Sew Hoy | Jazz | "Taller, Stronger, Better"—Guy Sebastian | Safe |
| Henry Byalikov | Jive | "Johnny B. Goode"—Judas Priest | Safe |

- Eliminated:

- Stephanie Golman
- Marko Panzic

- New Pairs:

- None

=== Week 4 (10 March 2008) ===
- Group dance: "Church"—T-Pain (Hip-hop; Choreographer: Juliette Verne)
- Musical Guest: "When I'm Gone"—Simple Plan
- Solos:

| Contestant | Style | Music | Results |
|---|---|---|---|
| Camilla Jakimowicz | Jazz | "What You Waiting For"—Gwen Stefani | Safe |
| Sermsah Bin Saad | Jazz | "Poison"—The Prodigy | Eliminated |
| Laura Brougham | Jazz | "Fighter"—Christina Aguilera | Eliminated |
| Anthony Ikin | Contemporary | "Feeling Good"—Michael Bublé | Safe |
| Rhiannon Villareal | Hip-hop | "What About"—Janet Jackson | Safe |
| Joel De Carteret | Hip-hop | "Time Is Now"—Moloko | Safe |

- Eliminated:

- Laura Brougham
- Sermsah Bin Saad

- New Pairs:

- Camilla Jakimowicz
- Anthony Ikin

=== Week 5 (17 March 2008) ===
- Group dance: "Blackbird"—Dionne Farris (Jazz; Choreographer: Kelley Abbey)
- Musical Guest: "Saving My Face"—KT Tunstall
- Bottom 3's solos:

| Contestant | Style | Music | Results |
|---|---|---|---|
| Rhiannon Villareal | Hip-hop | "4 My People"—Missy Elliott | Safe |
| Joel De Carteret | Hip-hop | "Signs"—Snoop Dogg feat. Justin Timberlake and Charlie Wilson | Eliminated |
| Camilla Jakimowicz | Jazz | "Let Me Entertain You"—Robbie Williams | Eliminated |
| Anthony Ikin | Contemporary | "Lightning Crashes"—Live | Safe |
| Kate Wormald | Jazz | "I Wish"—Fantasia Barrino, Yolanda Adams and Patti LaBelle | Safe |
| Graeme Isaako | Jazz | "Crazy" | Safe |

- Eliminated:

- Camilla Jakimowicz
- Joel De Carteret

- New Pairs:

- None. Now that only ten contestants remaining, new pairs are randomly assigned each week. They'll also be voted individually.

=== Week 6 (31 March 2008) ===
- Group dance: "Hip Hop Is Dead"—Nas feat. will.i.am (Hip-hop; Choreographer: Nacho Pop)
- Musical Guest: "You Will Only Break My Heart"—Delta Goodrem
- Solos:

| Contestant | Style | Music | Results |
|---|---|---|---|
| Jemma Armstrong | Foxtrot | "Mas Que Nada"—Sérgio Mendes feat. The Black Eyed Peas | Eliminated |
| Anthony Ikin | Contemporary | "Drops of Jupiter"—Train | Eliminated |
| Rhiannon Villareal | Hip-hop | "Last Night"—Diddy | Safe |
| Graeme Isaako | Hip-hop | "Hate That I Love You"—Rihanna & Ne-Yo | Safe |

- Eliminated:

- Jemma Armstrong
- Anthony Ikin

=== Week 7 (7 April 2008) ===
- Group dance: "The Song of the Heart"—Prince (Jazz; Choreographers: Project Moda)
- Musical Guest: "Stop and Stare"—OneRepublic
- Solos:

| Contestant | Style | Music | Results |
|---|---|---|---|
| Rhiannon Villareal | Hip-hop | "If"—Janet Jackson | Eliminated |
| Henry Byalikov | Cha-Cha | "Heartbreaker"—will.i.am feat. Cheryl Cole | Eliminated |
| Vanessa Sew Hoy | Jazz | "Listen"—Beyoncé Knowles | Safe |
| Graeme Isaako | Hip-hop | "Bad"—Michael Jackson | Safe |

- Eliminated:

- Rhiannon Villareal
- Henry Byalikov

=== Week 8 (14 April 2008) ===
- Group dance: "TBC"—TBC (TBC; Choreographers: TBC)
- Musical Guest: "TBC"—TBC
- Top 6 contestant’s solos:

| Contestant | Style | Music | Results |
|---|---|---|---|
| Kate Wormald | Jazz | "TBC"—TBC | Safe |
| Rhys Bobridge | Contemporary | "TBC"—TBC | Safe |
| Vanessa Sew Hoy | Jazz | "TBC"—TBC | Eliminated |
| Graeme Isaako | Hip-hop | "TBC"—TBC | Eliminated |
| Demi Sorono | B-Girl | "TBC"—TBC | Safe |
| Jack Chambers | Hip-hop | "TBC"—TBC | Safe |

- Eliminated:

- Vanessa Sew Hoy
- Graeme Isaako

=== Week 10 Finale (27 April 2008) ===
- Group dances: "Don't Stop The Music"—Rihanna (TBC; Choreographers: TBC)
- Musical Guest: "TBC"—TBC
- Judge's choice:
- 4th Place:
  - Demi Sorono
- **3rd Place**
  - Kate Wormald
- Runner-Up:
  - Rhys Bobridge
- Winner:
  - Jack Chambers

== Episodes ==
| No. | Airdate | Title | Timeslot | Ratings^{1} | Weekly Rank |
|---|---|---|---|---|---|
| 1 | 3 February 2008 | Auditions – Part 1: Perth and Brisbane | 7:30 pm – 9:00 pm | 1,829,000 (1st) | 1st |
| 2 | 4 February 2008 | Auditions – Part 2: Melbourne and Adelaide | 7:30 pm – 9:00 pm | 1,616,000 (1st) | 3rd |
| 3 | 6 February 2008 | Auditions – Part 3: Sydney | 7:30 pm – 9:00 pm | 1,628,000 (1st) | 2nd |
| 4 | 10 February 2008 | Top 100 – Part 1 | 7:30 pm – 9:00 pm | 1,600,000 (1st) | 1st |
| 5 | 11 February 2008 | Top 100 – Part 2 | 7:30 pm – 9:00 pm | 1,468,000 (1st) | 4th |
| 6 | 17 February 2008 | Top 20: Performance | 7:30 pm – 9:40 pm | 1,529,000 (2nd) | 4th |
| 7 | 18 February 2008 | Top 20: Verdict | 7:30 pm – 8:30 pm | 1,345,000 (7th) | 8th |
| 8 | 24 February 2008 | Top 18: Performance | 7:30 pm – 9:30 pm | 1,508,000 (1st) | 6th |
| 9 | 25 February 2008 | Top 18: Verdict | 7:30 pm – 8:30 pm | 1,457,000 (5th) | 8th |
| 10 | 2 March 2008 | Top 16: Performance | 7:30 pm – 9:15 pm | 1,483,000 (1st) | 4th |
| 11 | 3 March 2008 | Top 16: Verdict | 7:30 pm – 8:30 pm | 1,395,000 (5th) | 10th |
| 12 | 9 March 2008 | Top 14: Performance | 7:30 pm – 9:00 pm | 1,483,000 (1st) | 5th |
| 13 | 10 March 2008 | Top 14: Verdict | 7:30 pm – 8:40 pm | 1,335,000 (7th) | 9th |
| 14 | 16 March 2008 | Top 12: Performance | 7:30 pm – 9:10 pm | 1,781,000 (1st) | 1st |
| 15 | 17 March 2008 | Top 12: Verdict | 7:30 pm – 8:40 pm | 1,364,000 (4th) | 9th |
| 16 | 23 March 2008 | "Your Top 10" Special | 7:30 pm – 9:00 pm | 988,000 (5th) | 68th |
| 17 | 30 March 2008 | Top 10: Performance | 7:30 pm – 9:00 pm | 1,234,000 (8th) | 22nd |
| 18 | 31 March 2008 | Top 10: Verdict | 7:30 pm – 8:35 pm | 1,180,000 (8th) | 25th |
| 19 | 6 April 2008 | Top 8: Performance | 7:30 pm – 9:00 pm | 1,361,000 (4th) | 14th |
| 20 | 7 April 2008 | Top 8: Verdict | 7:30 pm – 8:40 pm | 1,249,000 (7th) | 22nd |
| 21 | 13 April 2008 | Top 6: Performance | 7:30 pm – 9:00 pm | 1,476,000 (4th) | 8th |
| 22 | 14 April 2008 | Top 6: Verdict | 7:30 pm – 8:40 pm | 1,164,000 (12th) | 32nd |
| 23 | 20 April 2008 | Top 4: Performance | 7:30 pm – 9:00 pm | 1,466,000 (5th) | 11th |
| 24 | 27 April 2008 | Grand Finale Night | 7:30 pm – 9:30 pm | 1,832,000 (2nd) | 3rd |
| 25 | 27 April 2008 | Grand Finale: Winner Announced | 9:25 pm – 9:30 pm | 1,877,000 (1st) | 2nd |

- ^{1} Overall national viewers, numbers in brackets indicate nightly ratings position.

== Ratings ==
3 February 2008 premiere of So You Think You Can Dance Australia attracted a peak audience of 2.15 million viewers. The show was the night's top-rating program, averaging 1.83 million viewers over its timeslot. The following two audition episodes also put up respectable figures, peaking at 2.04 million and 1.94 million viewers respectively. The Sunday night Top 100 show averaged 1.6 million viewers to become the most watched program of the night.

Since debuting, the weekly performance show had averaged around 1.5 million viewers since its debut. The series one finale averaged 1.8 million viewers, peaking at 2.2 million viewers nationwide. Over 50% of Ten's key 18–49 age demographic had tuned into the show.
