= So You Think You Can Dance Australia =

Australian reality TV programme

- Genre: Interactive reality
- Based on: So You Think You Can Dance by: Simon Fuller; Nigel Lythgoe
- Presented by: Natalie Bassingthwaighte; Carrie Bickmore
- Judges: Bonnie Lythgoe; Matt Lee; Jason Coleman; Paula Abdul; Jason Gilkison; Shannon Holtzapffel; Aaron Cash
- Country of origin: Australia
- Original language: English
- No. of seasons: 4
- No. of episodes: 88

Production
- Production locations: Fox Studios, Sydney
- Running time: 60 minutes
- Production companies: FremantleMedia Australia (Original series); Shine Australia (Revival series)

Original release
- Network: Network Ten
- Release: 3 February 2008 – 21 April 2010
- Release: 9 February – 1 May 2014

So You Think You Can Dance was an Australian version of the American reality dance competition So You Think You Can Dance. The show was hosted by Carrie Bickmore, with judges Paula Abdul, Shannon Holtzapffel, Jason Gilkison and Aaron Cash.

The first season began airing on Sunday, 3 February 2008 at 7.30 pm and continued on Sundays and Mondays until the final on 27 April 2008. The program's second season began airing on Sunday, 1 February 2009 and continued on Sundays and Mondays until the final on 26 April 2009. The third season began on 31 January 2010 and continued on Wednesdays and Thursdays until 21 April 2010. The show was previously hosted by former The X Factor judge Natalie Bassingthwaighte, with Jason Coleman, Matt Lee and Bonnie Lythgoe acting as the judges.

Through telephone and SMS text voting, viewers have chosen nineteen-year-old Broadway dancer Jack Chambers, eighteen-year-old Ballet dancer Talia Fowler and eighteen-year-old Contemporary dancer Robbie Kmetoni as Australia's Favourite Dancer. The eligible age-range for contestants is currently 18–35 years old.

In July 2010 it was announced Network Ten had cancelled So You Think You Can Dance Australia in favour of a new musical/dancing format for 2011. However, Network Ten said it was in continuing discussions with production company FremantleMedia Australia regarding the format's future. In 2011, rumors began to appear in the Australian media industry press that the series would be returned to broadcast, likely on original home network Ten. The show returned with a fourth series broadcast on Network Ten starting on 9 February 2014.

== Show format ==
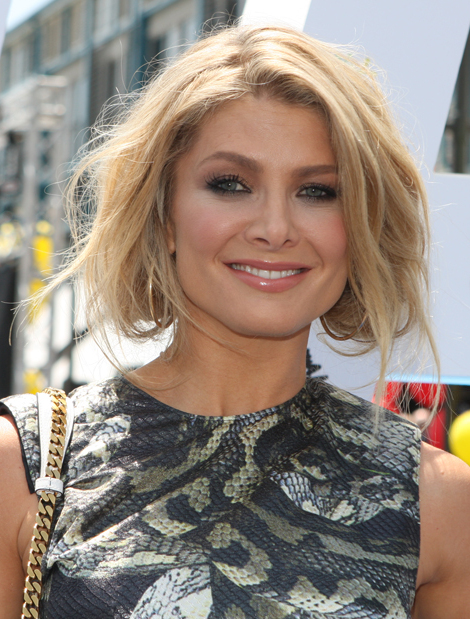
Rogue Traders vocalist Natalie Bassingthwaighte has served as the host of So You Think You Can Dance since its first season, presenting every episode since 2008 to 2010.

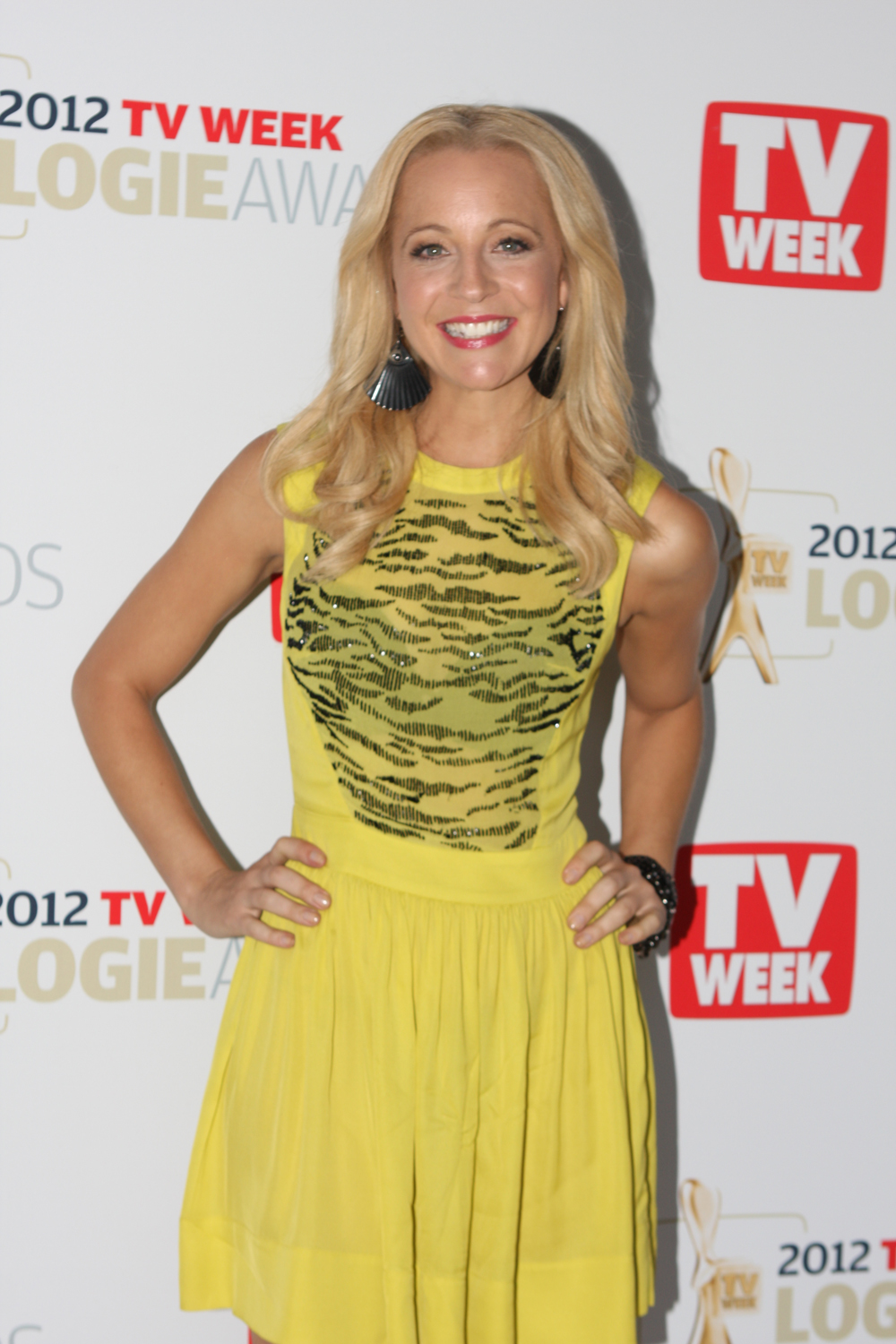
Television presenter Carrie Bickmore has served as the host of So You Think You Can Dance since its fourth season, presenting every episode since 2014.

A typical season of So You Think You Can Dance is divided between a selection process, during which expert judges select contestants from a wide pool of applicant dancers, and a competition phase, during which these "contestants" (more typically referred to as the "Top 20") compete for votes from home viewers. Although it is produced over months, the selection phase is highly edited and usually constitutes only the first 2 to 4 weeks of aired episodes with the competition episodes forming the remaining 7 to 9 weeks of the season.

=== Open auditions ===
The open auditions, the first stage in determining a season's contestants, take place in 5 to 8 major Australian cities each season and are typically open to anyone aged 18 to 35 at the time of their audition. The cities where auditions are held change from season to season but some, such as Melbourne, Adelaide, Brisbane, Sydney and Perth, have featured in most seasons. During this stage, the contestants perform a brief routine (typically a solo, but duet and group routines are allowed as well) before a panel of dance experts usually headed by Australian dance choreographer Jason Coleman. This panel then decides on the spot whether the dancer demonstrated enough ability and performance value to proceed further. If the contestant exhibited exceptional ability in their performance, judges award "a ticket to Sydney" (or in future seasons "a ticket to the Academy"), moving them instantly one step forward in the competition. Alternatively, if judges are on the fence about the contestant, they may ask the contestant to wait until the end of that day's auditions to participate in a short test of their ability to use professional choreography.

=== Callbacks ===
The second stage of the selection process is referred to as "the callbacks" (this round was referenced as "Sydney Week" for much of the show's run, as it was held in Sydney, but was called "Choreography Round" from future season. The callbacks consist of a several-day-long process in which the remaining hopefuls are tested for overall well-rounded dance ability, stamina, creativity, and ability to perform under pressure. The contestants are put through a battery of rounds that test their ability to use various dance styles; these are typically some of the more well-represented genres that are later prominent in the competition phase, such as hip-hop, jazz, ballroom, and contemporary. Additionally, the contestants may be asked to perform further solos in styles of their choosing and participate in a group choreography round in which small teams of contestants must display their musicality and ability to communicate professionally by choreographing a performance to a randomly selected piece of music. This challenge is notable as being the only time contestants are asked to choreograph themselves, aside from solos.

The callbacks are often collectively portrayed as one of the most exhausting and stressful stages of the competition; each successive round sees cuts in which a significant portion of the remaining contestants are eliminated from the competition and are given a limited amount of time to adapt to styles they are sometimes wholly unfamiliar with while being physically taxed by the rapid progression of rounds and a limited amount of rest. At the end of this process, usually less than 40 contestants remain in a pool the top contestants are chosen. The first four seasons have featured 20 "top" contestants for the competition portion of the show, but season 5 would have featured a Top 10.

=== Contestant stage ===
Following the contestant selection process, the show transitions into its regular competition phase, which lasts for the rest of the season. The competition stage is typically divided into eight weeks, generally with two contestants eliminated per week. Contestants are paired up into female-male couples that will sometimes stay paired for much of the remaining competition if neither is eliminated (would have in season 5, contestants have also been occasionally paired with "All Stars", returning contestants from previous seasons who pair up with the contestants, but who are not themselves competing). These couples perform 1 or 2 duets per week in different styles which are typically, but not always, randomly selected. These duets, as with all non-solo performances at this stage in the competition, are choreographed by professional choreographers. Before most duet performances, a video packets of clips of the couple preparing to perform the routine is shown. These packets are intended not only to demonstrate the couple's efforts to master the routine, but also to give glimpses of the personalities and personal histories of the contestants, as well as insights from the choreographer as to the thematic, narrative, and artistic intentions of the piece. Following each duet performance, the week's panel of judges gives critical feedback, often emphasizing the two key areas of technique and performance value. Duets and their accompanying video packets and critiques typically take up the majority of an episode but are often supplemented by solos, group numbers, and occasionally guest dance or musical performances.

== Series overview ==
=== Overview of format and presentation by season ===
Season	Dates	Host	Permanent judges	Separate results show?	Contestant showcase episode?	Number of contestants in first live show	Number of contestants eliminated per week	Number of contestants remaining in finale	Number of winners	All-Stars included in format?	Point at which judge eliminations end	Voting for individual contestants starting with
1	2008 (February 2008-April 2008)	Natalie Bassingthwaighte	Jason Coleman, Bonnie Lythgoe, Matt Lee	Yes	No	20	2	4	1	N/A	Top 10	Top 10
2	2009 (February–April)	Natalie Bassingthwaighte	Jason Coleman, Bonnie Lythgoe, Matt Lee	Yes	No	20	2	4	1	N/A	Top 10	Top 10
3	2010 (January–April)	Natalie Bassingthwaighte	Jason Coleman, Bonnie Lythgoe, Matt Lee	Yes	Yes	20	2	4	1	N/A	Top 10	Top 10
4	2014 (February–April)	Carrie Bickmore	Paula Abdul; Shannon Holtzapffel; Jason Gilkison; Aaron Cash	No	Yes	20	2	4	1	N/A	Top 10	Top 10

== Dance styles and choreographers ==
Throughout its four seasons, So You Think You Can Dance has featured dozens of distinct dance styles in its choreographed routines. Most of these styles fall into four categories that are regularly showcased and can be found in almost every performance episode: western contemporary/classical styles, ballroom styles, hip-hop/street styles as well as Jazz and its related styles. Various other forms of dance that do not especially fall into these broad categories are seen as well, but not as regularly. The following styles have all been seen in a choreographed duet or group routine; styles featured only in auditions or solos are not listed.

=== Classical styles ===
Routines from the classically derived style of contemporary dance are the most common dances seen on the show, being seen in every performance episode of the series (and typically at least twice per episode). While contemporary, lyrical, and modern dance are typically considered three separate (if overlapping) styles of dance, the practice on So You Think You Can Dance has been to refer to all routines in this area as "contemporary", except in the first season where the label "lyrical" was used for the same purpose. Ballet routines occur much more rarely, at a rate of one or two per season, since their introduction in the fourth season.

Genre	Styles
Western Classical styles
Western Classical styles	Contemporary, Lyrical, Modern, Ballet/Pas de Deux
Choreographers
Steven Agisilaou, Kelly Aykers, Josival Bispo, Rafael Bonacela, Sarah Boulter, Channing Cooke, Amè Delves, Debbie Ellis, Ame Delves, Jacqui Howard, Anthony Ikin, Dana Jolly, Chris Ladera, Debbie Ellis Linnert, Ludwig, Paul Malek, Sher Manu, Larrissa McGowan, Project Moda (Shannon Holtzapffel and Simon Lind), Penelope Mullen, Marko Panzic, Shaun Parker, Christopher Scott, Juliette "Jet" Verne, Travis Wall, Steven Watson, Natalie Weir, Paul White, Jason Winters, Brendan Yeates

=== Street and club styles ===
Hip-hop routines are also present in every performance episode. While these routines frequently feature elements from many different subgenres of hip-hop (locking and popping, for example) and various "street" styles (such as breaking), they are typically all labeled under the umbrella term of hip-hop. An exception is the now frequently featured lyrical hip-hop, which is unique amongst all styles on SYTYCD in that it is the only one that is held to have become a known distinct style at least in part as a result of the show; the style is widely attributed to regular show choreographers Tabitha and Napoleon D'umo and the term itself to judge Adam Shankman. These two broad categories are occasionally supplemented by routines that are labeled as krump, breakdancing, waacking, and stepping.

Genre	Styles
Street and Contemporary Club Styles
Street and Contemporary Club Styles	Hip-hop (umbrella term for all Popping, Locking, and New Style/Commercial Hip-Hop styles), Lyrical Hip-hop, Breaking, Krump, Stepping, Waacking, Vogue
Choreographers
Rosa Agius, Jason Bird, Vince Calingasan, Tiana Canterbury, Katie Cesaro, Tabitha and Napoleon D'umo, Alvin Decastro, Parris Goebel, Phillip Haddad, Tiana Joubert, Etienne Khoo, Matt Lee, Project Moda (Shannon Holtzapffel and Simon Lind), Kat Molnar, Manuela Oliveira, Nacho Pop, Jesse Rasmussen, Fabio Robles, Travers Ross, Andrew Sears, Christopher Scott, Garry Stewart, Yannus Sufandi, Supple, Juliette "Jet" Verne, Jason Winters

=== Ballroom styles ===
Ballroom styles are also seen regularly in every performance episode. These routines may use the movement of traditional International Standard forms or lean toward American competitive styles. Other routines may use street or regional variants or may combine elements of different variations.

Genre	Styles
Standard or Smooth Ballroom styles
Standard or Smooth Ballroom styles	Foxtrot, Tango, Quickstep, Waltz (including Smooth Waltz, Slow Waltz, American Slow Waltz, and Viennese Waltz variants)
Latin/Rhythm Ballroom styles
Latin/Rhythm Ballroom styles	Argentine Tango, Bolero, Cha-Cha-Cha, Jive, American Jive, Mambo, Paso Doble, Rumba, Salsa, Street Salsa, Samba, African Samba
Choreographers
Ana André, Sriani Argaet, Leanne Bampton, Masha Belash, Aleeta Blackburn, Sarah Boulter, Sandro Catalano, Rose Edwards, Anya Garnis, Jason Gilkison, Michael Glickman, Gordana Grandosek, Paul Green, Brendan Humphreys, Pasha Kovalev, Luda Kroitor, Natalie Lowe, Craig Monley, Giselle Peacock, Oliver Pineda, Carmelo Pizzino, Fabio Robles, Elena Samodanova, Gleb Savchenko, Csaba Szirmai, Trent Whiddon, Aric Yegudkin

=== Jazz, Broadway, and musical theater styles ===
Jazz is featured in nearly all performance episodes. While these routines are typically labeled simply "Jazz", the genre is notable as being one of the most fusional featured on the show and various style combinations and sub-categories have been referenced. Descended from Jazz but treated as a separate genre on SYTYCD, "Broadway" is analogous to the label "musical theater" outside Australia.

Genre	Styles
Jazz Styles
Jazz Styles	Jazz, Contemporary Jazz, Modern Jazz, Lyrical Jazz, African Jazz, Jazz-Funk, Latin Jazz, Pop-Jazz/Pop
Broadway/musical theatre styles
Broadway/musical theatre styles	Broadway, Burlesque, Can-Can, Tap
Choreographers
Kelley Abbey, Anthony Akin, Kelly Aykers, Aleeta Blackburn, Michael Boyd, Sally Clark, Jason Coleman, Amé Delves, Tyce Diorio, Square Division, Jason Gilkison, Andrew Hallsworth, Leah Howard, Tiana Joubert, Dan Karaty, Matt Lee, Simon Lynn, Cameron Mitchell, Project Moda (Shannon Holtzapffel and Simon Lind), Adam Parson, Nacho Pop, Michael Ralph, Adrian Ricks, Renee Ritchie, Wade Robson, Sue-Ellen Shook, Stephen Tannos, Paul White, Adam Williams, Mitchell Woodcock, Kate Wormald, Nathan Wright

=== Social styles ===
These dance styles are featured less frequently than their ballroom relatives but have been seen intermittently since the first season.

Genre	Styles
Social / Traditional Club Styles
Social / Traditional Club Styles	Charleston, Country-Western Two-Step, Disco, Go-Go, Hustle, Lindy Hop, Rock n' Roll, Swing, West Coast Swing
Choreographers
Michael Boyd, Rose Edwards

=== Regional/traditional styles ===
In addition to the broad categories above, many more styles that are less common in Australia are sometimes featured. Most of these are seen only once, but the Bollywood style has been featured several times per season since the fourth season.

Genre	Styles
Regional/Traditional Styles
Regional/Traditional Styles	Bollywood, African, Capoeira, Flamenco, Irish, Kalinka, Malevos, Tahitian, Tropak
Choreographers
Kadu Pires, Romona Lobo, Farah Shah, Larissa Thayane.

=== Grand finalists ===
Season	Year	Winner	Runner-up	Third place	Fourth place
1	2008	Jack Chambers (Broadway)	Rhys Bobridge (Contemporary/Jazz)	Kate Wormald (Commercial Jazz)	Demi Sorono (Hip-Hop)
2	2009	Talia Fowler (Ballet)	Charlie Bartley (Hip-Hop)	Amy Campbell (Contemporary)	Ben Veitch (Jazz)
3	2010	Robbie Kmetoni (Contemporary)	Jessie Hesketh (Contemporary)	Ivy Heeney (Jazz/Ballet)	Phillipe Witana (Hip-Hop)
4	2014	Michael Dameski (Contemporary)	Lauren Seymour (Lyrical Jazz)	Jay Johns (Tap/Hip-hop)	Renelle Jones (Jazz)

=== Season 1 (2008) ===
Auditions for the first season were held during July and August 2008 in Perth, Brisbane, Melbourne, Adelaide and Sydney. After being selected, through either an impressive initial audition or after a choreography workshop, the top 100 contestants spent a week in Sydney for more auditions, ultimately forming a Top 20. Auditions began on 9 October 2007 in Brisbane, Queensland and ended in Sydney, New South Wales on 6 November 2007. A 600-seat arena was constructed in Sydney for the live shows. Jack Chambers was announced as the winner on 26 April 2008. Chambers won $200,000 prize money and the title of Australia's Favourite Dancer, with Rhys Bobridge, Kate Wormald, Demi Sorono finishing as runner-up, third place and fourth place respectively. Several contestants later performed during the 2008 Australian Idol grand final, as well as Ten's New Year's Eve broadcast.

=== Season 2 (2009) ===
Auditions for the second season were held during September and November 2008. Contestants auditioning were requested to bring pre-approved copyright music CDs because of music licensing issues. Judges hoped that season 2 would see more industry contestants auditioning after the favourable response to the first season of the show. Repeats of the performance and results show aired a week later on MuchMusic. Talia Fowler was announced the winner on 27 April 2009. Fowler received $200,000 prize money, the title of Australia's Favourite Dancer and the opportunity to perform at the finale of America's version of So You Think You Can Dance, while Ben Veitch came 4th place, then Amy Campbell came 3rd place, while lastly Charlie Bartley was named runner-up.

Nigel Lythgoe and Mary Murphy made separate appearances in this season as guest judges.

=== Season 3 (2010) ===
The third season premiered on 31 January 2010. Robbie Kmetoni was announced the winner on 21 May 2010. Kmetoni received $200,000 prize money and the title of Australia's Favourite Dancer. Furthermore, he will have the opportunity to choose from three exclusive dance contracts (including Australian Dance Theatre, Hairspray and Burn the Floor) to perform throughout Australia and overseas, While Robbie Kmetoni's friend Jessie Hesketh was named runner-up, then Ivy Heeney came 3rd place, while lastly Phillipe Witana came 4th place and the first season where each contestants were in the bottom three or four.

=== Cancellation and Revival ===
In July 2010, it was announced Network Ten would not recommission So You Think You Can Dance Australia for a 2011 season. It follows media speculation the show had been cancelled, and talks Ten had a new "shiny floor" format to reveal. Ten advised FremantleMedia Australia that it would opt out of format, but didn't rule out a future return. Instead Ten was to develop a local version of British talent show Don't Stop Believing, inspired by the success of Glee. Don't Stop Believing was instead to be produced by Shine Australia, which is headed by former FremantleMedia Australia executives. Plans were halted late 2010, with the show cancelled before starting.

In October 2011, Ten began airing ads for So You Think You Can Dance Australia implying it would be returning soon, but Ten were yet to release details on when. In February 2012 rumors began to emerge in the Australian media press that former Australia's Next Top Model host Sarah Murdoch had been approached to take over hosting duties for a revival of the show as Natalie Bassingthwaighte has moved on to a judging position for Australia's iteration of music talent show The X-Factor who is replacing Natalie Imbruglia. The show was also rumored to be returning to its original network, Channel Ten. These rumors ultimately proved to be inaccurate when Ten revealed that it had engaged Murdoch to host a different dance-themed show entitled Everybody Dance Now. Ultimately the show did return to broadcast on Network Ten, airing season 4 in the spring of 2014 after a four-year hiatus.

=== Season 4 (2014) ===
The show resumed airing on 9 February 2014 featuring a shortened format with one show broadcast a week, similar to the U.S. seasons 9 and 10. The new format also eliminated the open audition process, with the season opening at the Top 100 stage, these contestants having been selected via audition tapes and processes not portrayed in any episode, a format atypical of So You Think You Can Dance shows, which generally show the contestant selection process from earlier auditions on. The show also featured an entire change in judging cast, with Paula Abdul, Aaron Cashacting, Jason Gilkison, and Shannon Holtzapffel filling the seats of the panel, as well as a change in host, with Carrie Bickmore presenting. The fourth season concluded on Thursday, 1 May with contemporary contestants Michael Dameski and Lauren Seymour taking 1st and 2nd places respectively. To date, neither Network Ten nor the show's producers have made a statement as to whether the show will be returning for a fifth season.

== Ratings ==
3 February 2008 premiere of So You Think You Can Dance Australia attracted a peak audience of 2.15 million viewers. The show was the night's top-rating program, averaging 1.83 million viewers over its timeslot. The following two audition episodes also put up respectable figures, peaking at 2.04 million and 1.94 million viewers respectively. The Sunday night Top 100 show averaged 1.6 million viewers to become the most watched program of the night.

After its debut, the weekly performance show averaged around 1.5 million viewers. The series one finale averaged 1.8 million viewers, peaking at 2.2 million viewers nationwide. Over 50 per cent of Ten's key 18–49 age demographic had tuned into the show. In season 3, ratings further slumped to a below million average, after which the show was cancelled. Season 4's revival of the series had smaller viewership still, with most episodes pulling less than a million viewers, and several seeing viewership as low as 300,000.

== Controversy ==
Jason Coleman has been questioned over his position as judge on the show, with members of the dance community accusing him of being under qualified, and using incorrect jargon on the show, calling a pivot a promenade. Eliminated contestant Marko Panzic also accused Coleman of playing favourites. Critics also cite a possible conflict of interest due to Coleman's external business relationship with choreographer Kelly Aykers.

Coleman has responded to these criticisms, saying: "Mate, this is just nit-picking. With this show a pivot is the same thing as a promenade. In my world it's called a promenade, in the ballroom dancing world it's called a pivot. I'm aware of the differences but I don't have time in my minute-and-a-half speech to explain that." In response to the Aykers issue, he said: "Kelly Aykers has delivered three great routines. I would never put myself in a position where I would compliment a person's work because they are my friend. If the work deserves a compliment it will receive it, if it does not, it will not."

The show has also received criticism from the Australian dance community and mainstream media over the representation of the art of dance on the show. In one example, commentator Valerie Lawson observes that "So You Think You Can Dance Australia goes further. Its very success ... is compromising dance as a performance art. The audience is led to believe that the most obvious effort, the most athletic of tricks, and the most vulgar of moves, represent dance at its best. As hips swivel, the studio audience cheers. When a guy lifts a girl with as much finesse as a forklift truck the audience roars its approval."

On two occasions the show has accidentally broadcast profanities during the PG-rated live show. On the first occasion, Ten issued an apology for a "indistinct and muffled" profanity uttered during the first elimination show, and promised that "efforts [have been] redoubled to prevent such an incident happening again." Nonetheless, when Sermsah Bin Saad was making his speech after being eliminated, he accidentally swore on national television, saying, "You guys are so fucking awesome!". At that time, Sermsah didn't realise that it was on live and apologised after finding out his mistake. In this case the profane word was censored during broadcast.

== See also ==
- Dance on television
