= Jason Gilkison =

Australian dancer

Jason Gilkison is an Australian professional ballroom dance champion and choreographer.

== Early life ==
Gilkison was born in Perth, Australia. He was raised by his single mum, Kay. At age 4, he began dancing at the Perth ballroom dance studio, founded by his grandparents Sam and Ronnie Gilkison, the first of its kind in Australia. Gilkison has lived in Sydney, London, England and Los Angeles, United States. He realised he was gay when he was 16 or 17.

== Dance career ==
At the age of 7 Gilkison was first paired with Peta Roby. Gilkison formed a professional partnership with Peta Roby in 1980 and were undefeated Australian Latin champions from 1981 to 1997. At age 23, Gilkison and Roby were the ranked pair in Ten-Dance Competition.

In 1990, Gilkison and Roby received the "Young Australian of the Year" Award. In 1991, they became the residing teachers at one of London's most prestigious ballroom schools, where they remained for seven years, training many of the world's leading dancers.

== Stage ==
Gilkison has served as choreographer and director for the ballroom dance stage show Burn the Floor Gilkison's longtime dance partner Roby served as associate producer of the show. Burn the Floor began touring in 1999 and reached Broadway, Manhattan in 2009.

In 2012, Gilkison choreographed Dancing with the Stars: Live in Las Vegas, a live stage show at the Tropicana in Las Vegas featuring celebrities and dancers from ABC's Dancing with the Stars. The production opened in April 2012 and ran for twelve weeks.

== TV and film ==
In 2008, Gilkison became a contributing choreographer for Australian version of the American reality dance-off series So You Think You Can Dance. Months later he joined the US version. Superstars of Dance, which he co-choreographed with Nakul Dev Mahajan.

As of 2014, Gilkison worked as the director of choreography on BBC One's Strictly Come Dancing.

=== As choreographer ===
==== So You Think You Can Dance ====
Season	Week	Dancers	Dance style	Music
4	8	Courtney Galiano; Mark Kanemura	Viennese Waltz	"The Time of My Life"—David Cook
4	8	Katee Shean; Joshua Allen	Paso Doble	"Filet" from Le Rêve
4	9	Courtney Galiano; Joshua Allen	Jive	"The Dirty Boogie"—The Brian Setzer Orchestra
6	0	Karen Hauer; Ashleigh Di Lello; Ryan Di Lello	Samba	"Everything I Can't Have"—Robin Thicke
6	1	Channing Cooke; Phillip Attmore	Jive	"Rockin' Robin"—The Jackson 5
6	1	Brandon Dumlao; Pauline Mata	Smooth Waltz	"You Light Up My Life"—Whitney Houston
6	7	Kathryn McCormick; Ryan Di Lello	Cha-Cha	"Put Your Hands on Me"—Joss Stone
6	7	Mollee Gray; Jakob Karr	Viennese Waltz	"Ordinary Day"—Vanessa Carlton
6	8	Kathryn McCormick; Ryan Di Lello	Samba	"Magalenha"—Sérgio Mendes
6	8	Ellenore Scott; Russell Ferguson	Paso Doble	"Village Attack" from Blood Diamond
7	0	Anya Garnis; Pasha Kovalev; Cristina Santana	Samba	"Work" (Freemason remix)—Kelly Rowland
8	0	Iveta Lukosiute; Pasha Kovalev	Ballroom Medley	"Ven a Bailar (On the Floor)"—Jennifer Lopez feat. Pitbull
8	1	Miranda Maleski; Robert Taylor Jr.	Jive	"Runaway Baby"—Bruno Mars
8	1	Iveta Lukosiute; Nick Young	Quickstep	"The Ballroom Blitz"—Sweet
8	6	Chelsie Hightower; Marko Germar	Samba	"Cinema Italiano (The Ron Fair Remix)"—Kate Hudson
8	6	Melanie Moore; Pasha Kovalev	Viennese Waltz	"Everybody Hurts"—Tina Arena
9	0	Lindsay Arnold; Nick Bloxsom-Carter; Witney Carson	Ballroom Medley	"Dance Again"—Jennifer Lopez feat. Pitbull
9	1	Amber Jackson; Nick Bloxsom-Carter	Viennese Waltz	"Nights in White Satin"—Tina Arena
9	1	Lindsay Arnold; Cole Horibe	Paso Doble	"Unstoppable"—E.S. Posthumus

==== So You Think You Can Dance Australia ====
Season	Week	Dancers	Dance style	Music
1	1	Jemma Armstrong; Rhys Bobridge	Waltz	"A New Day Has Come" from Celine Dion
1	1	Stephanie Golman; Marko Panzic	Jive	"Untouched"—The Veronicas
1	2	Kate Wormald; Hilton Denis	Foxtrot	"2 Hearts"—Kylie Minogue
1	3	Jemma Armstrong; Rhys Bobridge	Paso Doble	"O Verona" from the film Romeo + Juliet
1	3	Top 16	Ballroom	"Sing, Sing, Sing (With a Swing)"—Louis Prima
1	4	Henry Byalikov; Vanessa Sew Hoy	African Samba	"Lo-Lo Dzama"—Sum Svisti
1	8	Kate Wormald; Rhys Bobridge	Rumba	"Message to My Girl"—Split Enz
1	9	Demi Sorono; Jack Chambers	Cha-cha-cha	"Mercy"—Duffy
2	1	Talia Fowler; Emmanuel Rodriguez	Cha-Cha	"Hound Dog"-Smoky Joe's Cafe
2	2	Top 18	Rock and Roll/Latin Ballroom	"Objection (Tango)"-Shakira
2	3	Amy Campbell; Damien Samuel	Rumba	"Stepping Stone"-Duffy
2	4	Penny Higgs; Charlie Bartley	Viennese Waltz	"I Have Nothing"-Whitney Houston
2	6	Talia Fowler; Charlie Bartley	Quickstep	"Valerie"-Mark Ronson feat. Amy Winehouse
2	6	Penny Higgs; Ben Veitch	Foxtrot	"Rock with You (Frankie Knuckles Remix)"-Michael Jackson
2	7	Top 8	Foxtrot	"Ain't That A Kick in the Head"-Robbie Williams
2	8	Kat Risteska; Charlie Bartley	Tango	"Gotta Get Thru This (Acoustic)"-Daniel Bedingfield
2	8	Amy Campbell; Ben Veitch	Paso Doble	"Overture"-Australian Cast of Jesus Christ Superstar
2	9	Ash-Leigh Hunter; Damien Samuel	Foxtrot	"Hurt"-Christina Aguilera
3	0	Jessica Prince; Kieran McMahon; Matt Geronimi; Will Centurion	Viennese Waltz	"Never Tear Us Apart"—INXS
3	4	Robbie Kmetoni; Ivy Heeney	Paso Doble	"Sweet Disposition"—The Temper Trap
3	7	Nick Geurts; Jessie Hesketh	Cha-cha-cha	"Istanbul 1:26 am"—Orient Expressions

=== As judge ===
In 2014, Jason Gilkison joined the judging panel on the 4th season of So You Think You Can Dance Australia alongside Aaron Cash, Shannon Holtzapffel and Paula Abdul.

== See also ==
- Index of dance articles
- List of dances
- List of ethnic, regional, and folk dances by origin
- Outline of dance
