= Juliette Verne =

Australian choreographer

Juliette "JET" Verne (born 26 April 1972) is an Australian choreographer and dancer. She studied at Broadway Dance Center, Steps and the Alvin Ailey School of Dance in New York. Along with her husband, Douglas Blaikie, Verne is the founder and director of Sydney's Urban Dance Centre, which opened in January 2006. She was a member of The Rockettes dance troupe in New York for a year, and was a featured choreographer on So You Think You Can Dance Australia.

== Credits ==
- Verne's choreography credits include:
  - Australian Idol winner Guy Sebastian's performance at the Aria Awards
  - Guy Sebastian's "Beautiful Life" Australian tour.
  - Sony Music duo Shakaya for the Destiny's Child tour
  - Shakaya's video clip "Are You Ready"
  - Jive Record’s Samantha Jade for the Urban Music Awards 2007
  - USA hip-hop star Chingy on his Australian tour.
  - So You Think You Can Dance - Australia Choreographer:
    - So You Think You Can Dance Australia (season 1)
    - So You Think You Can Dance Australia (season 2)
    - So You Think You Can Dance Australia (season 3)
- Other choreography credits includes:
  - Deni Hines “Pull Up To My Bumper”
  - “Stomp” with Marcia Hines and Deni Hines
  - Cherry “SOS” single
  - Joanne’s “Jackie”
  - Fox Fire IV @ Rumba
  - “Buskers & Angels”: A Rock Musical written by Jon English
  - Nikki Bennett’s “Diamonds, Divas and Dolls” Cabaret Show.
  - Resident Choreographer for the Russian Coachman Restaurant in Sydney
- Choreographed fashion shows for labels:
  - One Teaspoon
  - Wish
  - Bonds
  - Backstage
  - Swarovski
