= Talia Fowler =

Australian dancer

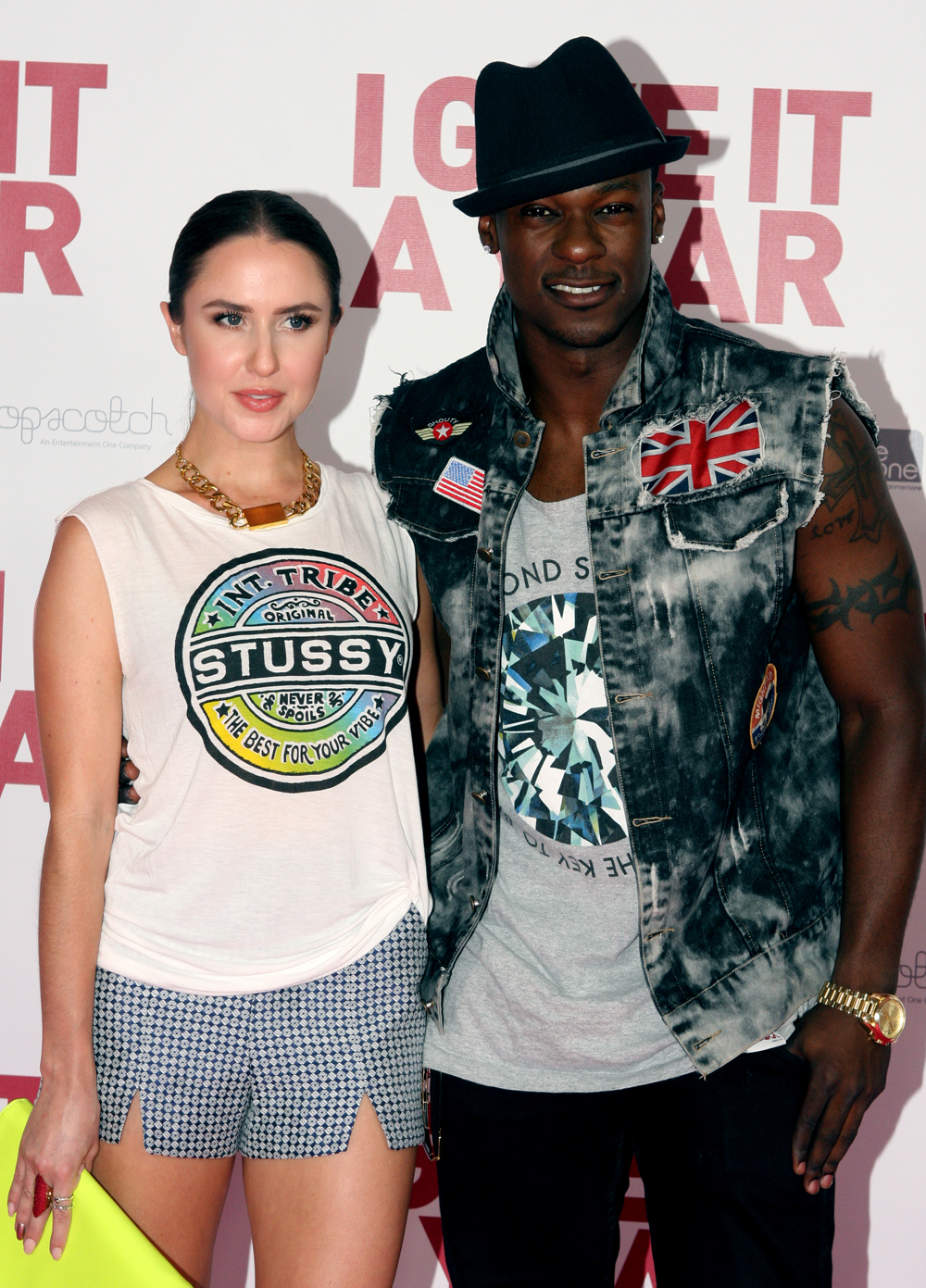
Talia Fowler with Timomatic (2013)

Talia Fowler is an Australian dancer who won the 2009 season of So You Think You Can Dance Australia.

Born in Brisbane, Queensland, Fowler started ballet and jazz dance at the age of three. After entering the Queensland Ballet, she stayed there for three years, being the youngest student ever to have been there.

Fowler left the company to enter SYTYCD to go after other styles. There, she beat favourite Charlie Bartley, Dubbo, to become the first female contestant to win So You Think You Can Dance Australia first place. After So You Think You Can Dance, she participated in the fifth season of the US version, she toured in the Australian production of Fame the musical alongside her past contestants Timomatic and Amy Campbell.
