= Shannon Holtzapffel =

Australian dancer and choreographer

- Born: Delft, Netherlands
- Occupations: Dancer; choreographer
- Awards: Chita Rivera Award (2018)

Shannon Holtzapffel is a Dutch-born Australian dancer and choreographer whose work spans live performance, television and film. He performed as a principal dancer for Michael Jackson's planned This Is It concert series and choreographed for and later judged So You Think You Can Dance Australia. His film work includes choreography, motion capture and visualization on projects including The Greatest Showman, Lyle, Lyle, Crocodile, Minions: The Rise of Gru and Ladybug & Cat Noir: The Movie. In 2018, he shared a Chita Rivera Award for the choreography of The Greatest Showman.

== Early life and training ==
Holtzapffel was born in Delft, the Netherlands, and moved with his family to Brisbane when he was four. He attended the Johnny Young Talent School and Davidia Lind Dance Centre, and graduated from Sunnybank State High School. At age six, he was cast in his first professional musical, The King and I. As a child performer, he was selected for Queensland Ballet's Sleeping Beauty and Australian Ballet seasons of Manon and Don Quixote, and appeared in his first television commercial at age seven. By age 16, he had performed for Marcia Hines and Deni Hines. His interest in dance developed through watching music videos, musicals and televised performances, and as a child he copied performers including Gene Kelly, Michael Jackson and MC Hammer.

Holtzapffel trained at Clarrissa Hill Dance Centre in Brisbane and received a scholarship to the Edge Performing Arts Center in Los Angeles at age 17. He credited choreographer Robert Sturrock with maturing him as a dancer and helping him make the transition from dance-school student to professional. After receiving the scholarship, Holtzapffel obtained representation in Los Angeles and spent six years travelling between work in Australia and the United States. Adam Parson later selected him over approximately 40 American dancers to tour Europe with Commonality Dance Company, citing his ability to inhabit different movement styles.

== Career ==
=== Performance and television ===
Holtzapffel and Simon Lind created Project Moda around 2005. By 2008, The Daily Telegraph described Holtzapffel as running the production company. Under the Project Moda name, Holtzapffel and Lind choreographed for the first two seasons of So You Think You Can Dance Australia. Their other choreography credits by 2008 included Delta Goodrem's Australian Visualise Tour, several Human Nature tours in Australia and the United States, Gladiators on the Seven Network and Carols by Candlelight. Project Moda's later television work included The X Factor Australia in 2010.

Holtzapffel worked as a motion-capture performer on the animated film Happy Feet. He took part in workshops and developed character movement by studying penguin behaviour and translating it into choreographed dance and exaggerated movement.

In 2008, after Holtzapffel was observed dancing during a session in Los Angeles, Britney Spears selected him as her partner for rehearsal-studio footage connected to her song "Mannequin". His other early work in the United States included Spears's music video for "Womanizer", the MTV documentary Britney: For the Record and promotional work for Circus.

While working in Australia on the sequel to Happy Feet, Holtzapffel travelled to Los Angeles to audition for Michael Jackson. He had two days to travel from Sydney to Los Angeles for the audition; Jackson attended the third day and selected him. In an interview published by El Universal alongside the film's director, Kenny Ortega, Holtzapffel recalled Jackson directing the dancers during the final rehearsals and urging them to consider each step carefully, perform at their best and enjoy the moment onstage. From more than 5,000 applicants, he was selected as one of Jackson's 11 principal dancers for the planned concert series. Holtzapffel later turned down a place on Britney Spears's The Circus Starring Britney Spears tour because it conflicted with This Is It.

Rehearsals began in late April and continued six days a week, for approximately eight hours a day. Holtzapffel participated in the final rehearsals at the Staples Center shortly before the company was due to travel to London. He featured prominently in the documentary assembled from the rehearsals and had been scheduled to continue with Jackson on the proposed world tour.

Following Jackson's death, Holtzapffel performed at the public memorial held at the Staples Center in Los Angeles in July 2009. He also performed at the 2009 MTV Video Music Awards with Janet Jackson. He later appeared in Michael Jackson's This Is It and took part in the worldwide campaign for the video game Michael Jackson: The Experience.

In 2010, Holtzapffel was selected as one of four dancers for Whitney Houston's Nothing but Love World Tour. He was also selected as one of eight principal dancers for Christina Aguilera's music video "Not Myself Tonight". Later that year, he appeared as a choreographer on the CMT reality competition series Your Chance to Dance, working with contestants on routines for the competition.

In 2011, Holtzapffel performed on Kylie Minogue's Aphrodite: Les Folies Tour and appeared in the concert film Aphrodite Les Folies – Live in London.

In 2012 and 2013, he performed on Jennifer Lopez's Dance Again World Tour, appeared in the concert film Jennifer Lopez: Dance Again, and was featured in A Step Away, a NuvoTV reality series following Lopez's dance crew across five continents and 66 cities. In the series, Holtzapffel discussed the physical demands of professional touring.

Holtzapffel provided the original choreography for Human Nature's Las Vegas Motown residency, which opened at the Imperial Palace in 2009. In 2013, he also served as choreographer for Smokey Robinson Presents Human Nature: The Motown Show at the Venetian. He also joined Paula Abdul, Jason Gilkison and Aaron Cash on the judging panel for the fourth season of So You Think You Can Dance Australia. He had previously worked on the series as a choreographer before joining its judging panel.

In 2016, Holtzapffel joined the season 22 cast of Dancing with the Stars as a troupe member. He appeared in a 360-degree virtual reality opening number with the show's professional dancers, set to Donna Summer's "Last Dance".

By 2018, Holtzapffel had choreographed three additional resident Las Vegas productions: Absinthe at Caesars Palace, Jukebox at the Venetian and Masters of Illusion at Bally's.

His work with P!nk included the 2017 music video for "Beautiful Trauma", which featured Channing Tatum. He subsequently performed on P!nk's Beautiful Trauma World Tour. The 2021 documentary P!nk: All I Know So Far, which followed the tour leading up to P!nk's first Wembley Stadium performance, featured Holtzapffel as a dancer. He later performed on P!nk's Summer Carnival tour, including its Australian leg in 2024.

His television choreography later included "From Unknown Graves", a 2022 episode of The Orville directed by Seth MacFarlane.

=== Film choreography and visualization ===
In 2010, Holtzapffel worked with director Michael Gracey and Hugh Jackman on a Lipton Ice Tea commercial filmed in Rio de Janeiro.

In 2016, Holtzapffel appeared as a dancer in the Hollywood party scene of La La Land.

Gracey later brought Holtzapffel into the early development of The Greatest Showman. Working with Cameron Sonerson during previsualization, he developed the film's musical sequences before pre-production began in New York. His work included development and choreography for "A Million Dreams", "Come Alive", "This Is Me", "From Now On" and "The Greatest Show", as well as work with Hugh Jackman and Zac Efron on "The Other Side". For the video previs, Holtzapffel performed the characters through motion capture, which Sonerson translated into animated storyboards used to plan the choreography, staging and camera work.

In The Greatest Showman, Holtzapffel portrayed Captain Costentenus, the Tattooed Man. Auditions for the film's dancer "Oddity" roles and ensemble were initially held in New York before being extended to Los Angeles, where Holtzapffel helped find performers who were cast.

The choreography of The Greatest Showman earned Holtzapffel and Ashley Wallen the Chita Rivera Award for Outstanding Choreography of a Theatrical Release in 2018.

In 2018, Holtzapffel was developing sequences, movement and choreography for a Skydance film. He also described working on scene and sequence design for a Skydance animated project, including creating live-action previews for animators. Holtzapffel and Cameron Sonerson contributed their expertise to the animated films Luck (2022) and Minions: The Rise of Gru (2022). Holtzapffel also served as choreographer on Minions: The Rise of Gru.

Holtzapffel's work on Lyle, Lyle, Crocodile encompassed development, sequence design, choreography, motion-capture performance and visual effects collaboration. He also developed movement for Javier Bardem's character, Hector P. Valenti. He described the challenge of translating human movement into that of a crocodile while keeping Lyle believable rather than overly cartoon-like, and said the choreography was shaped around what the character could do within each scene and environment.

On Ladybug & Cat Noir: The Movie, Holtzapffel worked with Cameron Sonerson on the film's choreography and visualization, and was also credited as a story artist. Drawing on ballet and jazz for Ladybug's movement, he also used a waltz to depict the developing relationship between the central characters. Director Jeremy Zag said he wanted the fight scenes to retain a sense of dance, with movement that could support both the action sequences and the musical numbers; Holtzapffel and Sonerson developed the choreography and visualization for that approach. Holtzapffel and Sonerson began collaborating in 2015, with other projects including The Greatest Showman and Lyle, Lyle, Crocodile.
