= Bonnie Lythgoe =

British former dancer (born 1949)

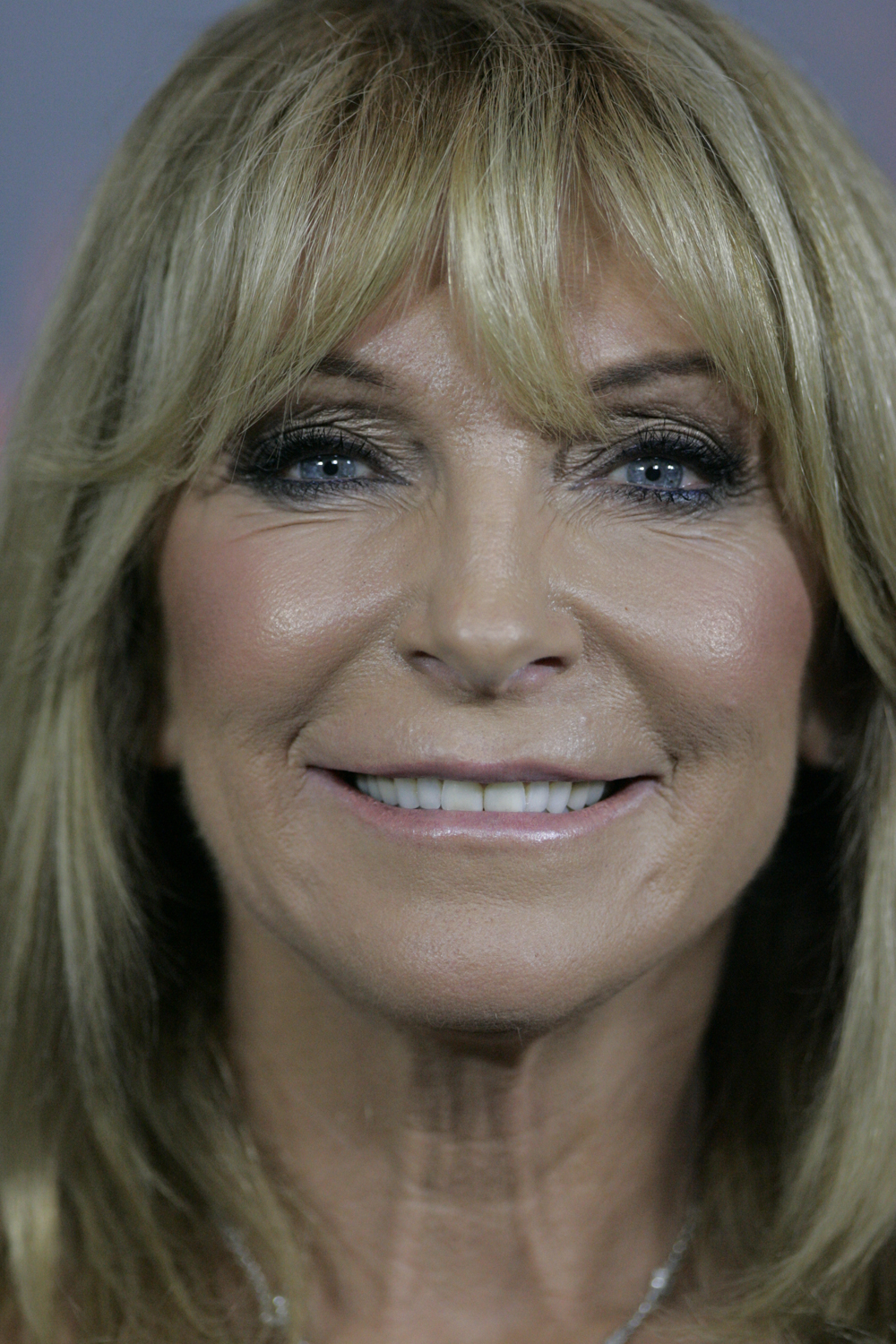
- Lythgoe in 2013
- Born: Bonita Shawe; 1949 (age 76–77); England
- Occupations: Dancer, producer, director
- Spouse: Nigel Lythgoe (m. 1974; div. 2010)
- Children: Simon; Kris

Bonita Lythgoe (née Shawe; born 1949) is a British former dancer who, since the 1990s and 2000s, has been the producer and director of various theatre productions, including pantomimes.

In 1969, aged 19, Lythgoe auditioned for the BBC's Young Generation dance troupe, which included her future husband Nigel among its members. The couple started dating, but after Nigel became choreographer in 1971, he dismissed Bonnie from the troupe. They continued their personal relationship, subsequently married and became the parents of two sons, Simon and Kristopher. The Lythgoes separated in 2007, and divorced in 2010.

Lythgoe's success as a choreographer of dance productions within the West End led to a career as a producer/director of various theatre productions, including pantomimes. She produced/directed and choreographed the Christmas 2006 version of Peter Pan, starring Henry Winkler, in Wimbledon and Cinderella, starring Patrick Duffy, in Woking.

Lythgoe was a producer and judge on season one of the US reality television series So You Think You Can Dance. She was one of the judges on So You Think You Can Dance Australia prior to its cancellation in July 2010.

In 2016, Lythgoe was a contestant on the second season of the Australian version of I'm a Celebrity...Get Me Out of Here!, lasting 3 weeks. Her charity of choice was Olivia Newton-John's Cancer and Wellness Centre.
