= So You Think You Can Dance (American TV series) season 9 =

So You Think You Can Dance
- Season 9
- Hosted by: Cat Deeley
- Judges: Nigel Lythgoe; Mary Murphy
- Winners: Eliana Girard; Chehon Wespi-Tschopp
- Runners-up: Tiffany Maher, Cyrus "Glitch" Spencer

Release
- Original network: Fox Broadcasting Company
- Original release: May 24 – September 18, 2012

Season chronology
- ← Previous; Season 8 Next → Season 10

So You Think You Can Dance, an American television dance competition, returned for its ninth season on May 24, 2012, on FOX Television. Fox and series creator Nigel Lythgoe have each independently confirmed that the weekly results show, a staple of the series in seasons 2–8, has been cut from the show format and that only one episode will air each week for the show's ninth season. This season has marked three firsts in the series history: this season had two winners (one female and one male), as opposed to the one winner format used in previous seasons, a contemporary dancer was not amongst the contestants remaining in the competition in the finale, and lastly, a ballet contestant is the winner of the competition.

== Auditions ==
Open auditions for this season were held in the following locations:

Air Date	Audition Venue	City	Audition Date	Guest judge
May 24, 2012	McFarlin Memorial Auditorium	Dallas, Texas	January 13, 2012	Lil' C
May 24, 2012	Manhattan Center	New York City	January 23, 2012	Tyce Diorio
May 30, 2012	Orpheum Theatre	Los Angeles, California	March 2, 2012	Jesse Tyler Ferguson
June 6, 2012	The Fox Theatre	Atlanta, Georgia	January 5, 2012	Debbie Allen
June 13, 2012	Capitol Theatre	Salt Lake City, Utah	February 23, 2012	Adam Shankman

=== Las Vegas week ===
The Las Vegas callbacks were held at Planet Hollywood Resort and Casino in Las Vegas, Nevada. For the first time in nine seasons, contestants were allowed to choose their own groups for the group choreography round, in contrast to previous seasons where the groups were assigned. With cuts made following each round of choreography, thirty-five contestants remained at the close of the week, prior to the selection of the Top 20.

Judges
Nigel Lythgoe, Mary Murphy, Adam Shankman, Debbie Allen, Tyce Diorio, Lil' C, Sonya Tayeh*, Jason Gilkison*, Travis Wall*
Task/style	Music	Choreographer(s)
Individual solo	Music chosen by contestant	The contestant
Hip-Hop	"B.O.B"—OutKast	Comfort Fedoke and tWitch
Broadway	"Must Be the Water"—Marc Broussard	Tyce Diorio
Jazz	"Freak Out (Gold Chains Panique Mix)"—My Brightest Diamond	Sonya Tayeh
Group routines	Chosen at random from a selection of songs including "Somebody That I Used to Know"—Gotye and "Glad You Came"—The Wanted	The contestants
Cha-cha-cha	"Let's Get Loud"—Jennifer Lopez	Jason Gilkison
Contemporary	"I Won't Give Up"—Jason Mraz	Travis Wall
Individual solo	Music chosen by contestant	The contestant

* Only participated on the judge's panel on the round they choreographed.

== Studio Shows ==
=== Format changes ===
In January 2012, Fox announced that So You Think You Can Dance would be returning for its ninth season in a format similar to that seen in season one; a single two-hour episode per week, eliminating each week's results show. In an interview shortly thereafter, Lythgoe hinted at a format where each week's episode is ended with the revelation of the bottom three couples (based on the votes from the previous week) but after all contestants had performed the new week's routines, giving the judges an additional routine to take into account when deciding which contestants (from amongst the bottom three couples) to save and which to send home for that week. This contrasts with the season one format where judges would nominate a bottom three couples and home viewers would vote out two contestants, the results being pre-taped and shown at the beginning of the next week's episode. Lythgoe also hinted at which elements of the results show were likely to be carried over into the new format, suggesting the group and guest dance routines would be shown priority over guest musical acts.

These above changes all proved to be in place once the season's performance shows began airing but were also accompanied by a number of other format tweaks. These additional changes most notably include the fact that the season will crown two winners (one female and one male) and that voting for individual contestants (as opposed to couples) began with the first week of the Top 20 competition with 1-855-GO-HIM## for the guys and 1-855-GO-HER## for the girls as opposed to halfway through the performance show phase, as in previous seasons. Additionally there have been tweaks to the format of the "dance for your life" solos, the last chance efforts which contestants are given to impress judges and remain in the competition if the at-home-viewer votes put them in the bottom 6 dancers. In previous seasons, all contestants who were in danger of elimination were automatically assigned to perform such solos but in season 9 the judges, taking into advisement the contestants' previous performances and the advice of the choreographers who have worked with them, will decide each week which (if any) contestants will perform solos. For example, in Week 2, the first week of the competition to feature eliminations (in this case a double elimination), the judges decided which two of the six contestants in danger they wished to save without asking for additional solos. By contrast, in week 3 they decided that Lindsay Arnold and George Lawrence Jr. would be safe without being required to perform a solo but the remaining four dancers were required to perform, with two ultimately eliminated.

The ninth season is also the first in which contestants have been able to exert some control over the styles they dance for their duets; Lythgoe revealed during the week 3 performances that during this season couples are given the ability to pick their styles from the pool of available routines for a given week, with the order of choosing determined by drawing lots. Season 9's Top 14 show also became the first episode in the show's history to feature only one style, the first to feature only one choreographer and the first to feature routines from previous seasons danced by new contestants when it aired as a tribute to long-time contributing choreographer Mia Michaels, with seven of her past contemporary routines danced by season 9 contestants.

=== Top 20 Contestants ===
==== Female Contestants ====
Contestant	Age	Home Town	Dance Style	Elimination date	Placement
Eliana Girard	21	Palm Beach, Florida	Ballet	September 18, 2012	Winner
Tiffany Maher	19	Fort Lauderdale, Florida	Jazz	September 18, 2012	Runner-up
Witney Carson	18	American Fork, Utah	Latin Ballroom	September 5, 2012	Top 6
Lindsay Arnold	18	Provo, Utah	Latin Ballroom	August 29, 2012	Top 8
Audrey Case	18	Edmond, Oklahoma	Jazz	August 22, 2012	Top 10
Amelia Lowe	18	Butler, New Jersey	Contemporary	August 15, 2012	Top 14
Janelle Issis	24	Vestavia Hills, Alabama	Belly Dancing	August 15, 2012	Top 14
Amber Jackson	21	Decatur, Georgia	Contemporary	July 25, 2012	Top 16
Alexa Anderson	19	Chandler, Arizona	Contemporary	July 18, 2012	Top 20
Janaya French	20	Aurora, Colorado	Contemporary	July 18, 2012	Top 20

==== Male Contestants ====
Contestant	Age	Home Town	Dance Style	Elimination date	Placement
Chehon Wespi-Tschopp	23	Zurich, Switzerland	Ballet	September 18, 2012	Winner
Cyrus "Glitch" Spencer	22	Atlanta, Georgia	Animation	September 18, 2012	Runner-up
Cole Horibe	26	Honolulu, Hawaii	Martial Arts Fusion	September 5, 2012	Top 6
Will Thomas	19	Troy, Michigan	Contemporary	August 29, 2012	Top 8
George Lawrence Jr.	19	Atlanta, Georgia	Contemporary	August 22, 2012	Top 10
Matthew Kazmierczak	21	Peoria, Arizona	Contemporary	August 15, 2012	Top 14
Dareian Kujawa	20	Saint Paul, Minnesota	Contemporary	August 15, 2012	Top 14
Brandon Mitchell	27	Wichita, Kansas	Stepping	July 25, 2012	Top 16
Daniel Baker	24	San Francisco, California (originally from Australia)	Ballet	July 18, 2012	Top 20
Nick Bloxsom-Carter	20	Thousand Oaks, California	Ballroom	July 18, 2012	Top 20

==== Elimination chart ====
Contestants are listed in reverse chronological order of elimination. Haley Reinhart's "Free" is played in the montage of a female contestant's elimination, and Mikey Wax's "Counting On You" is played in the male contestant's.

Legend
Female	Male	Bottom 6 contestants ^{1}	Bottom 4 contestants ^{1}

Week:	7/18	7/25	8/15	8/22	8/29	9/5	9/18
Contestant	Result						
Eliana Girard		Btm 6					Winner
Chehon Wespi-Tschopp	Btm 6			Btm 4			Winner
Tiffany Maher							Runner-Up
Cyrus "Glitch" Spencer							Runner-Up
Cole Horibe					Btm 4	Elim	
Witney Carson	Btm 6			Btm 4	Btm 4	Elim	
Will Thomas					Elim		
Lindsay Arnold		Btm 6	Btm 6		Elim		
George Lawrence Jr.		Btm 6	Btm 6	Elim			
Audrey Case				Elim			
Matthew Kazmierczak			Elim				
Amelia Lowe			Elim				
Dareian Kujawa		Btm 6	Elim				
Janelle Issis			Elim				
Brandon Mitchell		Elim					
Amber Jackson		Elim					
Daniel Baker	Elim						
Alexa Anderson	Elim						
Nick Bloxsom-Carter	Elim						
Janaya French	Elim						

^1 Voting will be based on the individual contestants from the start, rather than from Top 10 on.

=== Performance shows ===
Unlike previous seasons, each week's Bottom 6 / Bottom 4 contestants are determined by the previous week's voting. The judge's panel still chooses which of these bottom contestants will be eliminated each week until the Top Ten. However, not all contestants who are in danger of elimination will perform final solos by default; the judges will determine each week which contestants will be asked to perform a "dance for your life" solo, if any. As no voting had been conducted previously, no contestants were eliminated for the Week 1 show; as a result, four contestants were eliminated in the Week 2 show, as opposed to the usual two. No voting took place after the Top 6 performance / Top 4 announcement show. The next week's show (the Top 4 performance finale) was followed by voting, the results of which were announced yet one more week later on the season's grande finale.

==== Meet the Top 20 (June 27, 2012) ====
- Judges: Nigel Lythgoe, Mary Murphy, Zooey Deschanel
- Performances:

Contestants	Style	Music	Choreographer(s)
Alexa Anderson; Amber Jackson; George Lawrence Jr. Will Thomas	Contemporary	"We Found Love" (BBC Radio 1 Live Lounge)—Jessie J.	Tyce Diorio
Lindsay Arnold; Nick Bloxsom-Carter; Witney Carson	Cha-cha-cha	"Dance Again"—Jennifer Lopez feat. Pitbull	Jason Gilkison
Daniel Baker; Eliana Girard; Chehon Wespi-Tschopp	Ballet	"Romantic Inclinations/Like A Shot/Fury"—P. Mottram, S. Everitt, G. Shadid, T. Marberger	Dwight Rhoden; Desmond Richardson
Audrey Case; Tiffany Maher; Janelle Issis*	Jazz	"Sail"—Awolnation	Sonya Tayeh
Janaya French; Matthew Kazmierczak; Dareian Kujawa; Amelia Lowe	Contemporary	"Modern Drift"—Efterklang	Stacey Tookey
Cole Horibe; Brandon Mitchell; Cyrus Spencer	Martial Arts, Stepping, Animation	"Resolve"—Nathan Lanier	Christopher Scott
Top 10 female contestants	Contemporary	"Where the Light Gets In"—Sennen	Travis Wall
Top 10 male contestants	Jazz	"Precognition" (Steed Lord Machine Mix)—Steed Lord	Sonya Tayeh
Top 20	Contemporary	"Eyes" (Coachella Live 2012 version)—Kaskade	Mia Michaels

*Due to an illness, Janelle was unable to dance in the showcase. She would've danced in the jazz number with Audrey & Tiffany, as well as in the group routines.

==== Week 1 (July 11, 2012) ====
- Judges: Nigel Lythgoe, Mary Murphy, Kenny Ortega
- Group dance: "Architect of the Mind"—Kerry Muzzey (Modern; Choreographer: Christopher Scott)
- Performances:

Couple	Style	Music	Choreographer(s)
Witney Carson; Chehon Wespi-Tschopp	Samba	"Jump"—The Cube Guys & Lucinana	Louis van Amstel
Tiffany Maher; George Lawrence Jr.	Contemporary	"Turning Page"—Sleeping At Last	Sonya Tayeh
Janaya French; Brandon Mitchell	Lyrical hip-hop	"Take Care"—Drake featuring Rihanna	Nappytabs
Alexa Anderson; Daniel Baker	Jazz	"Hey Hey"— (DF's Attention Vocal Mix)—Dennis Ferrer	Sean Cheesman
Amber Jackson; Nick Bloxsom-Carter	Viennese Waltz	"Nights in White Satin"—Tina Arena	Jason Gilkison
Amelia Lowe; Will Thomas	Pop Jazz	"The Lovecats"—The Cure	Nappytabs
Janelle Issis; Dareian Kujawa	African Jazz	"Jungle"—Hilight Tribe	Sean Cheesman
Eliana Girard; Cyrus "Glitch" Spencer	Broadway	"Run and Tell That"—Hairspray (Original Broadway Cast)	Tyce Diorio
Audrey Case; Matthew Kazmierczak	Contemporary	"Unchained Melody"—The Righteous Brothers	Travis Wall
Lindsay Arnold; Cole Horibe	Paso Doble	"Unstoppable"—E.S. Posthumus	Jason Gilkison

==== Week 2 (July 18, 2012) ====
- Judges: Nigel Lythgoe, Mary Murphy, Adam Shankman
- Group dance: "The Beautiful People (District 78 remix)"—Marilyn Manson (Jazz; Choreographers: Tabitha and Napoleon D'umo)
- Guest dancers: Dancers from Step Up: Revolution ("Hands in the Air"—Timbaland feat. Ne-Yo)

Couple	Style	Music	Choreographer(s)	Results
Lindsay Arnold; Cole Horibe	Hip-hop	"Teeth"—Lady Gaga	Christopher Scott	Both Safe
Amelia Lowe; Will Thomas	Contemporary	"3326"—Ólafur Arnalds	Sonya Tayeh	Both Safe
Amber Jackson; Nick Bloxsom-Carter	Argentine Tango	"Tanguera"—Sexteto Mayor	Miriam Larici; Leonardo Barrionuevo	Bloxsom-Carter eliminated
Audrey Case; Matthew Kazmierczak	Jazz	"Hear Me Now" (Dri, Lind and Likka Mix)—Steed Lord	Sonya Tayeh	Both Safe
Janelle Issis; Dareian Kujawa	Lyrical hip-hop	"My Girl"—The Temptations	Christopher Scott	Both Safe
Janaya French; Brandon Mitchell	Broadway	"Bring on the Men"—Linda Eder	Sean Cheesman	French eliminated
Eliana Girard; Cyrus "Glitch" Spencer	Jive	"I'm Shakin'"—Jack White	Tony Meredith; Melanie LaPatin	Both Safe
Alexa Anderson; Daniel Baker	Contemporary	"So Long My Friend"—Yanni	Dee Caspary	Both eliminated
Tiffany Maher; George Lawrence Jr.	Foxtrot	"I Want to Be Loved by You"—Sinéad O'Connor	Tony Meredith; Melanie LaPatin	Both Safe
Witney Carson; Chehon Wespi-Tschopp	Bollywood	"Tandav Music"—Aatish Kapadia	Nakul Dev Mahajan	Both Bottom 6

- Amber Jackson and Brandon Mitchell became a new couple when their former pair were eliminated after the results were revealed.

==== Week 3 (July 25, 2012) ====
- Judges: Nigel Lythgoe, Mary Murphy, Christina Applegate
- Group dance: "The Here and After"—Jun Miyake (Contemporary; Choreographer: Tyce Diorio)
- Guest dancers: Alvin Ailey American Dance Theater ("Jungle Jazz"—Les Tambours du Bronx)
- Mens Elimination Montage: "Counting on You"—Mikey Wax

Couple	Style	Music	Choreographer(s)	Results
Tiffany Maher; George Lawrence Jr.	Hip-hop	"Out of My Mind"—B.o.B feat. Nicki Minaj	Tabitha and Napoleon D'umo	Lawrence in Bottom 6
Amber Jackson; Brandon Mitchell	Jazz	"Dr. Feelgood (Love is Serious Business)"—Aretha Franklin	Ray Leeper	Both eliminated
Janelle Issis; Dareian Kujawa	Cha-cha-cha	"Call Me Maybe"—Carly Rae Jepsen	Pasha Kovalev	Kujawa in Bottom 6
Lindsay Arnold; Cole Horibe	Contemporary	"Wild Horses"—Charlotte Martin	Mandy Moore	Arnold in Bottom 6
Amelia Lowe; Will Thomas	Jazz	"You!"—The Creatures featuring Siouxsie Sioux	Mandy Moore	Both Safe
Audrey Case; Matthew Kazmierczak	Salsa	"Cinco Salsa"—Sverre Indris Joner/HSC/Kork	Liz Lira	Both Safe
Witney Carson; Chehon Wespi-Tschopp	Contemporary	"I Will Always Love You"—Whitney Houston	Stacey Tookey	Both Safe
Eliana Girard; Cyrus "Glitch" Spencer	Hip-hop	"Toxic"—District 78 feat. Cheesa	Tabitha and Napoleon D'umo	Girard in Bottom 6

- Solos:

Contestant	Style	Music	Result
Amber Jackson	Contemporary	"This Is What Makes Us Girls"—Lana Del Rey	Eliminated
Brandon Mitchell	Stepping	"I Want It All Back"—Tye Tribbett & G.A.	Eliminated
Eliana Girard	Ballet	"Near Light"—Ólafur Arnalds	Safe
Dareian Kujawa	Contemporary	"Ordinary People"—John Legend	Safe

==== Week 4 (August 15, 2012) ====
- Judges: Nigel Lythgoe, Mary Murphy, Michael Nunn, Billy Trevitt
- Group dance: "Hanging On"—Active Child (White Sea Remix) (Contemporary, Choreographer: Mia Michaels)
- Theme: All couples perform routines choreographed by Mia Michaels for previous seasons.

Couple	Style	Music	Results
Eliana Girard; Cyrus "Glitch" Spencer	Contemporary	"Mercy"—Duffy	Safe
Tiffany Maher; George Lawrence Jr.	Contemporary	"Hometown Glory"—Adele	Lawrence Jr. in Bottom 6
Amelia Lowe; Will Thomas	Contemporary	"Koop Island Blues"—Koop feat. Ane Brun	Lowe eliminated
Janelle Issis; Dareian Kujawa	Contemporary	"Dreaming with a Broken Heart"—John Mayer	Both eliminated
Audrey Case; Matthew Kazmierczak	Contemporary	"Time"—Billy Porter	Kazmierczak eliminated
Witney Carson; Chehon Wespi-Tschopp	Contemporary	"Calling You"—Celine Dion	Safe
Lindsay Arnold; Cole Horibe	Contemporary	"Gravity"—Sara Bareilles	Arnold in Bottom 6

- Solos:

Contestant	Style	Music	Result
Amelia Lowe	Contemporary	"Falling Slowly"—Glen Hansard and Marketa Irglova	Eliminated
Janelle Issis	Belly dance	"Inta Omri"—Elie Attieh	Eliminated
Lindsay Arnold	Samba	"Hip Hip Chin Chin"—Club des Belugas	Safe
George Lawrence Jr.	Contemporary	"So Long, Lonesome"—Explosions In the Sky	Safe
Dareian Kujawa	Contemporary	"It's a Man's Man's Man's World"—Joshua Ledet	Eliminated
Matthew Kazmierczak	Contemporary	"Delicate"—Damien Rice	Eliminated

==== Week 5 (August 22, 2012) ====
- Judges: Nigel Lythgoe, Mary Murphy, Benjamin Millepied
- Group dance: "The Cool World Stomp"—Mark Isham (Broadway, Choreographer: Tyce Diorio)
- Guest dancers: LA Dance Project ("Trio"—Nico Muhly; Choreographer: Benjamin Millepied)

Couple	Style	Music	Choreographer(s)	Results
Brandon Bryant; Tiffany Maher	Disco	"You Make Me Feel..." (Disco Fries remix)—Cobra Starship feat. Sabi	Doriana Sanchez	Safe
Witney Carson; Nick Lazzarini	Jazz	"Sing It Back"—Moloko	Travis Wall	Bottom 4
Anya Garnis; Cole Horibe	Cha-cha-cha	"Glad You Came"—The Wanted	Dmitry Chaplin	Safe
Lindsay Arnold; Jakob Karr	Broadway	"Dancin' Dan" (Me and My Shadow) from Fosse	Spencer Liff	Safe
Kathryn McCormick; Will Thomas	Bollywood	"Ooh La La" from The Dirty Picture	Nakul Dev Mahajan	Safe
Jaimie Goodwin; Cyrus "Glitch" Spencer	Contemporary	"Outro"—M83	Travis Wall	Safe
Lauren Gottlieb; Chehon Wespi-Tschopp	Hip-hop	"Pretty Wings"—Maxwell	Dave Scott	Bottom 4
Allison Holker; George Lawrence Jr.	Jazz	"Bahamut"—Hazmat Modine	Tyce Diorio	Eliminated
Eliana Girard; Alex Wong	Contemporary	"Bang Bang (My Baby Shot Me Down)"—Nancy Sinatra	Stacey Tookey	Safe
Stephen "tWitch" Boss; Audrey Case	Hip-hop	"Sincerely, Jane"—Janelle Monáe	Dave Scott	Eliminated

- Solos:

Contestant	Style	Music	Result
Witney Carson	Samba	"You'll Find a Way" (Switch & Sinden remix)—Santigold	Safe
Audrey Case	Contemporary	"And I Am Telling You I'm Not Going"—Jennifer Holliday	Eliminated
Chehon Wespi-Tschopp	Ballet	"Til Enda"—Ólafur Arnalds (Commissioned by Wayne McGregor/Random Dance)	Safe
George Lawrence Jr.	Contemporary	"Brotsjor"—Ólafur Arnalds	Eliminated

==== Week 6 (August 29, 2012) ====
- Judges: Nigel Lythgoe, Mary Murphy, Jesse Tyler Ferguson
- Group dance: "Run Boy Run"—Woodkid (Contemporary; Choreographer: Peter Chu)

Couple	Style	Music	Choreographer(s)	Results
Stephen "tWitch" Boss; Witney Carson	Hip-hop	"My Homies Still"—Lil Wayne feat. Big Sean	Luther Brown	Bottom 4
Allison Holker; Cole Horibe	Contemporary	"Possibly Maybe" (Instrumental)—Björk	Sonya Tayeh	Bottom 4
Ryan Di Lello; Eliana Girard	Quickstep	"That Man"—Caro Emerald	Jonathan Roberts	Safe
Lindsay Arnold; Alex Wong	Jazz	"Somebody That I Used to Know"—Gotye feat. Kimbra	Sonya Tayeh	Eliminated
Lauren Gottlieb; Will Thomas	Hip-hop	"Dance My Pain Away" (District 78 remix)—Wye Oak	Christopher Scott	Eliminated
Melanie Moore; Cyrus "Glitch" Spencer	Jazz	"Badder Badder Schwing"—Freddy Fresh feat. Fatboy Slim	Mandy Moore	Safe
Anya Garnis; Chehon Wespi-Tschopp	Argentine Tango	"Breathing Below Surface"—Jesse Cook	Miriam Larici; Leonardo Barrionuevo	Safe
Tiffany Maher; Ade Obayomi	Contemporary	"The Power of Love"—Celine Dion	Mandy Moore	Safe

- Solos:

Contestant	Style	Music	Result
Tiffany Maher	Jazz	"I Was Here"—Glee cast	Safe
Will Thomas	Contemporary	"Better Man"—James Morrison	Eliminated
Lindsay Arnold	Paso Doble	"Señorita"—bond	Eliminated
Chehon Wespi-Tschopp	Contemporary	"On the Nature of Daylight"—Max Richter	Safe
Witney Carson	Cha-cha-cha	"Where Have You Been"—Rihanna	Bottom 4
Cole Horibe	Martial Arts Fusion	"Arise"—E.S. Posthumus	Bottom 4
Eliana Girard	Contemporary Ballet	"Infra 8"—Max Richter	Safe
Cyrus "Glitch" Spencer	Animation	"Existence" (VIP)—Excision & Downlink	Safe

==== Week 7 (September 5, 2012) ====
- Judges: Nigel Lythgoe, Mary Murphy, Christina Applegate
- Group dance: "Scream"—Kelis (Jazz; Choreographer: Sonya Tayeh)

Couple	Style	Music	Choreographer(s)	Results
Tiffany Maher; Benji Schwimmer	Jive	"What I Like About You"—Lillix	Jean-Marc Généreux	Safe
Cole Horibe; Melanie Moore	Jazz	"Too Close"—Alex Clare	Sonya Tayeh	Eliminated
Stephen "tWitch" Boss; Eliana Girard	Hip-hop	"Please Mr. Postman" (District 78 remix)—The Marvelettes	Christopher Scott	Safe
Kathryn McCormick; Chehon Wespi-Tschopp	Contemporary	"Eli, Eli" (A Walk to Caseara)—Sophie Milman	Tyce Diorio	Safe
Witney Carson; Marko Germar	Lyrical Jazz	"No Nothing"—Curtis & Reinhard feat. Blaire	Ray Leeper	Eliminated
Comfort Fedoke; Cyrus "Glitch" Spencer	Dubstep	"Cinema" (Skrillex remix)—Benny Benassi feat. Gary Go	Christopher Scott	Safe
Witney Carson; Chehon Wespi-Tschopp	Cha-cha-cha	"Where Have You Been"—Rihanna	Jean-Marc Généreux	Carson eliminated
Eliana Girard; Cole Horibe	Contemporary	"Adagio for Strings"—Brno Philharmonic Orchestra	Mia Michaels	Horibe eliminated
Tiffany Maher; Cyrus "Glitch" Spencer	Broadway	"Treat Me Rough" (Girl Crazy)—Debbie Gravitte	Spencer Liff	Safe

- Solos:

Contestant	Style	Music	Result
Witney Carson	Paso Doble	"Malagueña"—Brian Setzer '68 Comeback Special	Eliminated
Chehon Wespi-Tschopp	Ballet	"Way Back Home"—District 78	Safe
Tiffany Maher	Lyrical jazz	"Just the Way You Are"—Carmen Reece	Safe
Cole Horibe	Martial Arts Fusion	"Night of the Wolf"—Nox Arcana	Eliminated
Eliana Girard	Contemporary	"I Will Follow You Into the Dark"—Death Cab for Cutie	Safe
Cyrus "Glitch" Spencer	Animation	"Harem"—Sarah Brightman	Safe

==== Week 8 (September 11, 2012) ====
- Group dance: "Eine kleine Nachtmusik" (District 78 remix)—KPM Studio Artists (Broadway; Choreographer: Tyce Diorio)
- Guest judges: Nigel Lythgoe, Mary Murphy, Rob Marshall

Couple	Style	Music	Choreographer(s)
Eliana Girard; Cyrus "Glitch" Spencer	Paso Doble	"The Game Has Changed"—Daft Punk	Jason Gilkison
Tiffany Maher; William Wingfield	Jazz	"Time is Now"—Moloko	Sonya Tayeh
Eliana Girard; Chehon Wespi-Tschopp	Classical ballet	"The Nutcracker Suite—Pas De Deux"—Bruton Apm Studios	Marat Daukayev
Tiffany Maher; Cyrus "Glitch" Spencer	Lyrical hip-hop	"Best Thing I Never Had"—Beyoncé Knowles	Tessandra Chavez
Allison Holker; Chehon Wespi-Tschopp	Contemporary	"Leave" from Once	Stacey Tookey
Eliana Girard; Tiffany Maher	Broadway	"When You're Good to Mama" from Chicago	Ray Leeper
Cyrus "Glitch" Spencer; Chehon Wespi-Tschopp	Jazz	"Fangs" (District 78 remix)—Little Red Lung	Sonya Tayeh
Eliana Girard; Alex Wong	Contemporary	"Without You"—Harry Nilsson	Travis Wall
Tiffany Maher; Chehon Wespi-Tschopp	Rumba	"Love Me Tender"—Adam Levy and Norah Jones	Dmitry Chaplin
Stephen "tWitch" Boss; Cyrus "Glitch" Spencer	Animation	"Like a Criminal"—District 78	Christopher Scott

- Top 6 contestant's solo:

Contestant	Style	Music
Eliana Girard	Ballet	"Passacaglia"—Johann Johannsson
Cyrus "Glitch" Spencer	Animation	"Holy Ghost" (Helicopter Showdown & Sluggo Remix)—Messinian
Tiffany Maher	Jazz	"I Believe"—Fantasia Barrino
Chehon Wespi-Tschopp	Contemporary	"How It Ends"—DeVotchKa

==== Week 9 (Finale) (September 18, 2012) ====
- Judges: Nigel Lythgoe, Mary Murphy, Tyce Diorio, Debbie Allen, Lil' C, Adam Shankman
- Group dances & guest performers:

Contestants and Guest(s)	Style	Music	Choreographer
Top 20	Contemporary/Hip-Hop	"Torn"—Nathan Lanier	Sonya Tayeh; Christopher Scott
Cyrus "Glitch" Spencer; Comfort Fedoke; Stephen "tWitch" Boss; Christopher Scott	Animation	"Holy Ghost (Helicopter Showdown and Sluggo Remix)"—Messinian	Christopher Scott
Dragon House; Bryan Gaynor	Hip-hop/Animation	"Cryosleep"—Cyberoptics	Dragon House; Bryan Gaynor
Top 10 with All-Stars	Jazz/Hip-hop	"The Circle of Life/Nants Ingonyama (District 78 Remix)" from The Lion King	Nappytabs

===== Musical Guest =====
- Carly Rae Jepsen - This Kiss

===== Judges & grand-finalists' picks =====
Contestants	Style	Music	Choreographer	Chosen by
Audrey Case; Matthew Kazmierczak	Contemporary	"Unchained Melody"—The Righteous Brothers	Travis Wall	Nigel Lythgoe
Stephen "tWitch" Boss; Witney Carson	Hip-hop	"My Homies Still"—Lil Wayne feat. Big Sean	Luther Brown	Lil' C
Tiffany Maher; George Lawrence Jr.	Contemporary	"Turning Page"—Sleeping At Last	Sonya Tayeh	Debbie Allen
Lindsay Arnold; Cole Horibe	Paso Doble	"Unstoppable"—E.S. Posthumus	Jason Gilkison	Adam Shankman
Amelia Lowe; Will Thomas	Pop-Jazz	"The Lovecats"—The Cure	Nappytabs	Tyce Diorio
Kathryn McCormick; Chehon Wespi-Tschopp	Contemporary	"Eli, Eli" (A Walk to Caseara)—Sophie Milman	Tyce Diorio	Mary Murphy
Eliana Girard; Alex Wong	Contemporary	"Bang Bang (My Baby Shot Me Down)"—Nancy Sinatra	Stacey Tookey	Eliana Girard
Brandon Bryant; Tiffany Maher	Disco	"You Make Me Feel..." (Disco Fries remix)—Cobra Starship feat. Sabi	Doriana Sanchez	Cat Deeley
Anya Garnis; Chehon Wespi-Tschopp	Argentine Tango	"Breaking Below Surface"—Jesse Cook	Miriam Larici; Leonardo Barrionuevo	Chehon Wespi-Tschopp
Tiffany Maher; Ade Obayomi	Contemporary	"The Power of Love"—Celine Dion	Mandy Moore	Tiffany Maher
Stephen "tWitch" Boss; Cyrus "Glitch" Spencer	Animation	"Like a Criminal"—District 78	Christopher Scott	Cyrus "Glitch" Spencer

- Female Runner-up
  - Tiffany Maher
- Female Winner
  - Eliana Girard
- Male Runner-up
  - Cyrus "Glitch" Spencer
- Male Winner
  - Chehon Wespi-Tschopp

=== All-Stars Dance Pool ===
All-Stars, Contestant Partners, and Results
Season	Former Contestant	Dance Styles	Placement	Contestant			
Season	Former Contestant	Dance Styles	Placement	Week 5	Week 6	Week 7	Week 8
1	Nick Lazzarini	Contemporary	Winner	Witney			
2	Allison Holker	Contemporary	Top 8	George	Cole		Chehon
2	Benji Schwimmer	Swing	Winner			Tiffany	
3	Anya Garnis	Latin/ballroom	Top 12	Cole	Chehon		
3	Lauren Gottlieb	Contemporary/Jazz/Hip-hop	Top 6	Chehon	Will		
3	Jaimie Goodwin	Contemporary	Top 10	Cyrus			
4	Stephen "tWitch" Boss	Hip-hop	Runner-up	Audrey	Witney	Eliana	Cyrus
4	Comfort Fedoke	Hip-hop	Top 8			Cyrus	
4	William Wingfield	Contemporary	Top 8				Tiffany
5	Brandon Bryant	Contemporary	Runner-up	Tiffany			
5	Ade Obayami	Contemporary	Top 6		Tiffany		
6	Ryan Di Lello	Latin/Ballroom	6th place		Eliana		
6	Jakob Karr	Contemporary	Runner-up	Lindsay			
6	Kathryn McCormick	Contemporary	3rd place	Will		Chehon	
7	Alex Wong	Ballet	Top 8	Eliana	Lindsay		Eliana
8	Marko Germar	Lyrical Jazz	3rd place			Witney	
8	Melanie Moore	Contemporary	Winner		Cyrus	Cole	

This contestant was eliminated this week.
This contestant was in the bottom 4 this week.
These two dancers won the competition.

== Ratings ==
=== U.S. Nielsen ratings ===
Show	Episode	First air date	Rating (18–49)	Share (18–49)	Viewers (millions)	Nightly rank	Weekly rank
1	Auditions: Dallas and New York City	May 24, 2012	2.4	8	6.26	1	13
2	Auditions: Los Angeles	May 30, 2012	2.7	8	7.15	1	3
3	Auditions: Atlanta	June 6, 2012	2.5	8	6.66	1	3
4	Auditions: Salt Lake City	June 13, 2012	2.5	8	6.71	1	8
5	Vegas Callbacks	June 20, 2012	2.4	8	6.76	1	6
6	Meet the Top 20	June 27, 2012	2.1	7	5.74	2	
7	Top 20 Perform (Part 1)	July 11, 2012	2.0	6	5.88	2	
8	Top 20 Perform (Part 2)	July 18, 2012	1.8	6	5.10	4	
9	Top 16 Perform	July 25, 2012	1.7	5	5.12	4	
10	Top 14 Perform	August 15, 2012	1.8	5	4.77	6	
11	Top 10 Perform	August 22, 2012	1.5	5	4.53	6	
12	Top 8 Perform	August 29, 2012	1.5	5	4.16	5	
13	Top 6 Perform	September 5, 2012	1.5	4	4.21	7	
14	Top 4 Perform	September 11, 2012	1.5	4	4.33	8	
15	Finale	September 18, 2012	1.6	5	4.71	8	

== See also ==
- List of So You Think You Can Dance finalists
