= So You Think You Can Dance (American TV series) season 10 =

So You Think You Can Dance
- Season 10
- Hosted by: Cat Deeley
- Judges: Nigel Lythgoe; Mary Murphy
- Winners: Amy Yakima; Du-Shaunt "Fik-Shun" Stegall
- Runners-up: Jasmine Harper; Aaron Turner

Release
- Original network: Fox Broadcasting Company
- Original release: May 14 – September 10, 2013

Season chronology
- ← Previous; Season 9 Next → Season 11

So You Think You Can Dance, a televised American dance competition, began broadcast of its tenth season on May 14, 2013. It airs on the FOX Television Network and was hosted by Cat Deeley and featured returning permanent judges Nigel Lythgoe, who also serves as one of the show's executive producers, and Mary Murphy. The show featured many of the format changes instituted in the previous season, including notably a single episode per week/voting round (seasons two through eight featured two episodes per week). It was also the first season in the show's history that a tap contestant not only made it past the third week of competition, but made the finale. It is also the first season to last longer than nine weeks. Lythgoe announced in the finale that the show has been renewed for the eleventh season.

== Auditions ==
Open auditions for season 10 were held in the following locations:

Air Date	Audition Venue	City	Audition Date	Guest judge
May 14, 2013	The Orpheum Theatre	Los Angeles, California	March 22, 2013	Jesse Tyler Ferguson
May 15, 2013	The Fillmore	Detroit, Michigan	February 12, 2013	Stephen "Twitch" Boss
May 21, 2013	The Orpheum Theatre	Los Angeles, California	March 22, 2013	Jesse Tyler Ferguson
May 21, 2013	The Joe R. and Teresa Lozano Long Center for the Performing Arts	Austin, Texas	January 18, 2013	Minnie Driver
May 28, 2013	Boston Opera House	Boston, Massachusetts	February 21, 2013	Adam Shankman
June 4, 2013	Orpheum Theatre	Memphis, Tennessee	March 14, 2013	Wayne Brady

== Las Vegas Week ==
The Las Vegas callbacks were held at the Planet Hollywood Resort and Casino in Paradise, Nevada. Contestants had to learn and perform various styles of choreography with cuts being made after every round. By the end of the week, only 33 contestants remained to be selected for the Top 20.

Judges
Nigel Lythgoe, Mary Murphy, Adam Shankman, tWitch, Nappytabs*, Sonya Tayeh*, Chelsie Hightower (season 4) & Dmitry Chaplin* (season 2), Stacey Tookey*, Jason Derulo**, Hannah Simone**
Task/style	Music	Choreographer(s)
Individual solo	Music chosen by contestant	The contestant
Hip-Hop	"Ball"—T.I. feat. Lil Wayne	Nappytabs
Jazz	"Latch"—Disclosure (band)	Sonya Tayeh
Cha-cha-cha	"Respect"—Aretha Franklin	Chelsie Hightower (season 4) & Dmitry Chaplin (season 2)
Group routines	Chosen at random from a selection of songs	The contestants
Contemporary	"Give Me Love"—Ed Sheeran	Stacey Tookey

* Only participated on the judge's panel on the round they choreographed.

** Brought in as special guest judges.

== Studio shows ==
=== Top 20 contestants ===
Contestants' dance styles and hometowns are based on those listed on the official website.

==== Female contestants ====
Contestant	Age	Home town	Dance style	Elimination date	Placement
Amy Yakima	19	Northville, Michigan	Jazz	September 10, 2013	Winner
Jasmine Harper	20	Rochester, New York	Contemporary	September 10, 2013	Top 4
Hayley Erbert	18	Topeka, Kansas	Contemporary	August 27, 2013	Top 6
Jenna Johnson	19	Provo, Utah	Ballroom	August 20, 2013	Top 8
Makenzie Dustman	18	Temecula, California	Contemporary	August 13, 2013	Top 10
Malece Miller	19	Salt Lake City, Utah	Contemporary	August 6, 2013	Top 12
Alexis Juliano	19	Coral Springs, Florida	Tap	July 30, 2013	Top 14
Mariah Spears	19	Chandler, Arizona	Hip-Hop	July 23, 2013	Top 16
Jasmine Mason	19	Placentia, California	Jazz	July 9, 2013	Top 18
Brittany Cherry	19	Pleasant Grove, Utah	Ballroom	July 2, 2013	Top 20

==== Male contestants ====
Contestant	Age	Home town	Dance style	Elimination date	Placement
Du-Shaunt "Fik-Shun" Stegall	18	Las Vegas, Nevada	Hip-Hop	September 10, 2013	Winner
Aaron Turner	25	Las Vegas, Nevada	Tap	September 10, 2013	Top 4
Paul Karmiryan	22	Los Angeles, California	Latin Ballroom	August 27, 2013	Top 6
Tucker Knox	23	Nashville, Tennessee	Contemporary	August 20, 2013	Top 8
Nico Greetham	18	Woodbridge, Virginia	Contemporary	August 13, 2013	Top 10
Alan Bersten	19	Minnetonka, Minnesota	Ballroom	August 6, 2013	Top 12
Curtis Holland	19	Miami, Florida	Tap	July 30, 2013	Top 14
Dorian "Bluprint" Hector	20	Atlanta, Georgia	Animation	July 23, 2013	Top 16
Jade Zuberi	21	Detroit, Michigan	Animation	July 9, 2013	Top 18 (withdrew)
Carlos Garland	24	Jacksonville, Florida	Contemporary	July 2, 2013	Top 20

==== Elimination chart ====
Legend
Female	Male	Bottom 6 contestants	Bottom 4 contestants	Withdrew	Eliminated

Week:	7/2	7/9	7/23	7/30	8/6	8/13	8/20	8/27	9/10
Contestant	Result								
Amy Yakima					Btm 4				Winner
Du-Shaunt "Fik-Shun" Stegall							Btm 4		Winner
Jasmine Harper				Btm 6					Runner-Up
Aaron Turner									Runner-Up
Paul Karmiryan								Elim	
Hayley Erbert							Btm 4	Elim	
Tucker Knox					Btm 4	Btm 4*	Elim		
Jenna Johnson		Btm 6	Btm 6		Btm 6	Btm 4	Elim		
Nico Greetham				Btm 6	Btm 6	Elim			
Makenzie Dustman	Btm 6		Btm 6	Btm 6		Elim			
Alan Bersten	Btm 6		Btm 6	Btm 6	Elim				
Malece Miller					Elim				
Curtis Holland		Btm 6	Btm 6	Elim					
Alexis Juliano		Btm 6		Elim					
Dorian "BluPrint" Hector		Btm 6	Elim						
Mariah Spears	Btm 4		Elim						
Jade Zuberi	Btm 4	WD							
Jasmine Mason		Elim							
Carlos Garland	Elim								
Brittany Cherry	Elim								

* Due to Tucker Knox being injured on August 6, he was automatically placed in the Bottom 4 for the next show.

=== Performances ===
==== Meet the Top 20 (June 18, 2013) ====
- Judges: Nigel Lythgoe, Mary Murphy, Adam Shankman
- Performances:

Contestants	Style	Music	Choreographer(s)
Mariah Spears; Du-Shaunt "Fik-Shun" Stegall	Hip-Hop	"Ball"—T.I. feat. Lil Wayne	Luther Brown
Makenzie Dustman; Nico Greetham; Jasmine Harper; Tucker Knox	Contemporary	"Goes On and On"—Sleeping at Last	Stacey Tookey
Curtis Holland; Alexis Juliano; Aaron Turner*	Tap	"You Really Did It" (Live)—Jason Mraz	Anthony Morigerato
Dorian "BluPrint" Hector; Jade Zuberi	Animation	"Trigger"—Kezwik feat. Mel Presson	Christopher Scott
Hayley Erbert; Carlos Garland; Malece Miller	Contemporary	"Stay"—Rihanna feat. Mikky Ekko	Mia Michaels
Alan Bersten; Brittany Cherry; Jenna Johnson; Paul Karmiryan	Samba	"Wings"—Little Mix	Louis van Amstel
Jasmine Mason; Amy Yakima	Jazz	"Enjoy"—Björk	Sonya Tayeh
Top 10 Male Contestants	Hip-Hop/Contemporary	"Sand"—Nathan Lanier feat. Karen Whipple	Christopher Scott
Top 10 Female Contestants	Pop Jazz	"Let's Have a Kiki" (Guwremix)—Fanny Pak & District 78	Ray Leeper
Top 20	Jazz	"Ghost of Sky" (Epic Dub)—Steed Lord	Sonya Tayeh

*Emilio Dosal, a hip-hop contestant, was originally selected in the Top 20. Shortly after, he sustained an injury forcing him to withdraw from the competition. Aaron Turner, number 11 in the list of male contestant, took his place in the Top 20 contestants.

==== Week 1 (June 25, 2013) ====
- Group dance: "Puttin' on the Ritz"—Herb Alpert feat. Lani Hall (Jazz-Funk; Choreographers: Tabitha and Napoleon D'umo)
- Judges: Nigel Lythgoe, Mary Murphy, Wayne Brady
- Performances:

Couple	Style	Music	Choreographer(s)	Result
Mariah Spears; Carlos Garland	Jive	"Get It Right"—Fantasia Barrino	Jason Gilkison	Spears Bottom 6 Garland eliminated
Jasmine Mason; Alan Bersten	Contemporary	"Can't Help Falling in Love" (Live at Daytrotter)—Ingrid Michaelson	Travis Wall	Bersten Bottom 6
Malece Miller; Jade Zuberi	Jazz	"Silver Screen Shower Scene"—Felix da Housecat	Travis Wall	Zuberi Bottom 6
Jenna Johnson; Tucker Knox	Broadway	"That's All"—Kevin Spacey	Tyce Diorio	Safe
Brittany Cherry; Dorian "BluPrint" Hector	African Jazz	"Drumming Circle"—Professor Trane & The Energizers	Sean Cheesman	Cherry eliminated
Alexis Juliano; Nico Greetham	Hip-hop	"Last Time" (Knife Party Remix)—Labrinth	Christopher Scott	Safe
Makenzie Dustman; Paul Karmiryan	Viennese Waltz	"I'm with You"—Avril Lavigne	Jason Gilkison	Dustman bottom 6
Jasmine Harper; Aaron Turner	Jazz	"Bottom of the River"—Delta Rae	Sonya Tayeh	Safe
Hayley Erbert; Curtis Holland	Hip-hop	"Go"—Delilah	Christopher Scott	Safe
Amy Yakima; Du-Shaunt "Fik-Shun" Stegall	Contemporary	"Elsa"—The Valerie Project	Sonya Tayeh	Safe

==== Week 2 (July 2, 2013) ====
- Group dance: "The Heroic Weather Conditions of the Universe Part 1 – A Veiled Mist" from Moonrise Kingdom (Contemporary, Choreographer: Tyce Diorio)
- Judges: Nigel Lythgoe, Mary Murphy, Christina Applegate
- Solos:

Contestant	Style	Music	Result
Mariah Spears	Krump	"Hard in Da Paint"—Waka Flocka Flame	Safe
Carlos Garland	Contemporary	"Radioactive"—Imagine Dragons	Eliminated
Brittany Cherry	Latin Ballroom	"Hacksaw"—Ooah	Eliminated
Jade Zuberi	Animation	"De Novo Adagio"—Alicia Keys	Safe

- Performances:

Due to the format change, the contestants who were already eliminated will still be dancing providing their partner is still in the competition.

Couple	Style	Music	Choreographer(s)	Result
Hayley Erbert; Curtis Holland	Jazz	"Mama Knows Best"—Jessie J	Ray Leeper	Holland Bottom 6
Jasmine Harper; Aaron Turner	Lyrical hip-hop	"Tears Always Win"—Alicia Keys	Tabitha and Napoleon D'umo	Safe
Malece Miller; Jade Zuberi	Bollywood	"Radha" from Student of the Year	Nakul Dev Mahajan	Zuberi withdrew
Alexis Juliano; Nico Greetham	Contemporary	"Old Skin"—Ólafur Arnalds & Arnór Dan	Stacey Tookey	Juliano Bottom 6
~~Brittany Cherry~~; Dorian "BluPrint" Hector	Broadway	"It's Oh So Quiet" from Ice Princess	Spencer Liff	Hector Bottom 6
Jasmine Mason; Alan Bersten	Tango	"Escape From Slavery"—PP Music	Miriam Larici; Leonardo Barrionuevo	Mason eliminated
Makenzie Dustman; Paul Karmiryan	Jazz	"Mannequin" (Skeet & Tito Remix)—Trish	Sean Cheesman	Safe
Mariah Spears; ~~Carlos Garland~~	Contemporary	"Dead in the Water"—Ellie Goulding	Stacey Tookey	Safe
Amy Yakima; Du-Shaunt "Fik-Shun" Stegall	Hip-hop	"After Party"—Dorrough	Tabitha and Napoleon D'umo	Safe
Jenna Johnson; Tucker Knox	Cha-cha-cha	"I Like It Like That" (Aaron Jerome remix)—Pete "El Conde" Rodríguez	Dmitry Chaplin	Johnson Bottom 6

==== Week 3 (July 9, 2013) ====
- Group dance: "Pretty Face" (Nathan Lanier remix)—Sóley (Jazz Choreographers: Christopher Scott & Sonya Tayeh)
- Judges: Nigel Lythgoe, Mary Murphy, Paula Abdul, Erin Andrews
- Solos:

Contestant	Style	Music	Result
Alexis Juliano	Tap	"Try a Little Tenderness"—Otis Redding	Last to be called Safe
Jasmine Mason	Jazz	"10 Seconds"—Jazmine Sullivan	Eliminated
Jenna Johnson	Cha-cha-cha	"Wild"—Jessie J feat. Big Sean	Safe

Couple	Style	Music	Choreographer(s)	Result
Amy Yakima; Du-Shaunt "Fik-Shun" Stegall	Paso Doble	"Tactical Dominance" (Orch Hybrid Version)—Jack Trammell	Jean-Marc Généreux	Safe
Jasmine Harper; Aaron Turner	Broadway	"They Just Keep Moving the Line"—Smash cast feat. Megan Hilty	Spencer Liff	Safe
Makenzie Dustman; Paul Karmiryan	Contemporary	"No Day but Today" (Live from Soundstage)—Idina Menzel	Lindsay Nelko	Dustman Bottom 6
~~Jasmine Mason~~; Alan Bersten	Jazz	"Veins"—Charlotte Martin	Sean Cheesman	Bersten Bottom 6
Jenna Johnson; Tucker Knox	Hip-Jazz (hip-hop and jazz i.e. jazz-funk)	"Dangerous" (Immortal version)—Michael Jackson	Keone Madrid; Mari Madrid	Johnson Bottom 6
Malece Miller; Marko Germar*	Contemporary	"In the Embers"—Sleeping at Last	Sonya Tayeh	Safe
Hayley Erbert; Curtis Holland	Samba	"Straight to Memphis"—Club des Belugas	Jean-Marc Généreux	Holland Bottom 6
Alexis Juliano; Nico Greetham	Jazz	"I Put a Spell on You"—Nina Simone	Spencer Liff	Safe
Mariah Spears; Dorian "BluPrint" Hector	Hip-hop	"Bring the Noize"—M.I.A.	Luther Brown	Both eliminated

* Due to a meniscus injury, Jade Zuberi withdrew from the competition. Marko Germar (who was not a contestant on the show) danced in his place with Zuberi's pair Malece Miller.

==== Week 4 (July 23, 2013) ====
- Group dance: "New World"—The Irrepressibles (Contemporary; Choreographers: Stacey Tookey and Peter Chu)
- Judges: Nigel Lythgoe, Mary Murphy, Carly Rae Jepsen
- Solos:

Contestant	Style	Music	Result
Makenzie Dustman	Contemporary	"Claire de Lune" — Claude Debussy, performed by Laura Sullivan	Safe
Alan Bersten	Paso Doble	"Return of the King"—X-Ray Dog	Safe
Curtis Holland	Tap	"Used to Love U"—John Legend	Safe
Mariah Spears	Hip-hop	"Set It Off"—Kardinal Official feat. The Clipse	Eliminated
Dorian "BluPrint" Hector	Animation	"Illusion of Choice"—Gramatik	Eliminated

Couple	Style	Music	Choreographer(s)	Result
Alexis Juliano; Nico Greetham	Jive	"Mayhem"—Imelda May	Tony Meredith; Melanie LaPatin	Juliano eliminated Greetham in bottom 6
Jenna Johnson; Tucker Knox	Contemporary	"Hangin' By a Thread"—Jann Arden	Travis Wall	Safe
~~Mariah Spears~~; ~~Dorian "BluPrint" Hector~~	Jazz	"Fall Into the Sky"—Zedd & Lucky Date feat. Ellie Goulding	Brian Friedman	
Malece Miller; Alan Bersten	Hip-hop	"Bassline"—Chris Brown	Dave Scott	Bersten in bottom 6
Hayley Erbert; Curtis Holland	Contemporary	"Don't Let Go Yet" (Radio Edit)—David J. Roch	Dee Caspary	Holland eliminated
Amy Yakima; Du-Shaunt "Fik-Shun" Stegall	Jazz	"Under the Bridge" (Sous le port) from The Triplets of Belleville	Tyce Diorio	Safe
Makenzie Dustman; Paul Karmiryan	Hip-hop	"Pretty Lil' Heart"—Robin Thicke feat. Lil' Wayne	Dave Scott	Dustman in bottom 6
Jasmine Harper; Aaron Turner	Quickstep	"Pencil Full of Lead"—Paolo Nutini	Tony Meredith; Melanie LaPatin	Harper in bottom 6

==== Week 5 (July 30, 2013) ====
- Group dance: "Dimman Kryper Sakta In"—District 78 (Jazz/Ballroom; Choreographers: Dmitry Chaplin and Sonya Tayeh)
- Judges: Nigel Lythgoe, Mary Murphy, Anna Kendrick
- Solos:

Contestant	Style	Music	Result
Alexis Juliano	Tap	"Stand By Me"—Ben E. King	Eliminated
Jasmine Harper	Jazz	"Endangered Species"—Dianne Reeves	Safe

Couple	Style	Music	Choreographer(s)	Result
Jenna Johnson; Tucker Knox	Hip-hop	"Slight Work"—Wale feat. Big Sean	Luther Brown	Bottom 6
~~Alexis Juliano~~; Nico Greetham	Contemporary	"Ashes"—The Bengsons	Sonya Tayeh	Greetham Bottom 6
Hayley Erbert; Leonardo Barrionuevo*	Argentine Tango	"Este Es El Rey"—Juan D'Arienzo	Miriam Larici; Leonardo Barrionuevo	Safe
Makenzie Dustman; Paul Karmiryan	Jazz	"You'll Find a Way" (Switch & Sinden Remix)—Santigold	Sonya Tayeh	Safe
Jasmine Harper; Aaron Turner	Contemporary	"The District Sleeps Alone Tonight"—Birdy	Justin Giles	Safe
Amy Yakima; Du-Shaunt "Fik-Shun" Stegall	Hip-hop	"Let's Get It On"—Marvin Gaye	Christopher Scott	Yakima Bottom 6
Malece Miller; Alan Bersten	Salsa	"Pa' Los Rumberos"—Tito Puente & His Orchestra	Jonathan Platero	Both eliminated
Alan Bersten; Makenzie Dustman; Hayley Erbert; Nico Greetham; Jenna Johnson; Spencer Liff*; Malece Miller	Broadway	"Come Together"—Joe Cocker	Spencer Liff	N/A
Jasmine Harper; ~~Alexis Juliano~~; Paul Karmiryan; Tucker Knox; Du-Shaunt "Fik-Shun" Stegall; Aaron Turner; Amy Yakima	Contemporary	"Tears of An Angel"—RyanDan	Bonnie Story	N/A

* Curtis Holland injured his shoulder during rehearsal and couldn't perform on the show. Leonardo Barrionuevo (who was a choreographer on the show) danced in his place with Holland's pair Hayley Erbert.

==== Week 6 (August 6, 2013) ====
- Group dance: "Pandeyjee Seeti" from Dabangg 2 (Bollywood; Choreographer: Nakul Dev Mahajan)
- Judges: Nigel Lythgoe, Mary Murphy, Kenny Ortega
- Solos:

Contestant	Style	Music	Result
Tucker Knox	Contemporary	"Maestro" from The Holiday	Safe
Amy Yakima	Jazz	"Je Suis Malade"—Lara Fabian	Safe
Malece Miller	Contemporary	"Patient Love"—Passenger	Eliminated
Alan Bersten	Samba	"Mas que Nada"—Sergio Mendes feat. Black Eyed Peas	Eliminated

Couple	Style	Music	Choreographer(s)	Result
Hayley Erbert; Nico Greetham	Broadway	"Kiss of the Spider Woman"—Jeffrey Huard & Chita Rivera	Sean Cheesman	Greetham eliminated
~~Malece Miller~~; ~~Alan Bersten~~	Jazz	"Come Dance With Me"—Michael Bublé	Mandy Moore	
Jenna Johnson; Alex Wong*	Paso Doble	"He's A Pirate" (Ship Ahoy Tribal Remix)—Chris Joss & Klaus Badelt	Jean-Marc Généreux	Bottom 4
Makenzie Dustman; Paul Karmiryan	Contemporary	"The Edge of Glory" (Live from A Very Gaga Thanksgiving)—Lady Gaga	Mandy Moore	Dustman eliminated
Amy Yakima; Du-Shaunt "Fik-Shun" Stegall	Viennese Waltz	"A Thousand Years, Pt. 2"—Christina Perri & Steve Kazee	Jean-Marc Généreux	Safe
Jasmine Harper; Aaron Turner	Hip-hop	"Gold Rush"—Clinton Sparks feat. 2 Chainz, Macklemore & D.A.	Tabitha and Napoleon D'umo	Safe
Top 6 Boys*	Lyrical hip-hop	"It's A Man's Man's Man's World"—Joshua Ledet	Tabitha and Napoleon D'umo	N/A
Top 6 Girls	Contemporary	"Young and Beautiful" (DH Orchestral Version)—Lana Del Rey	Stacey Tookey	N/A

* Due to a knee infection, Tucker Knox was unable to perform. Alex Wong (Season 7 contestant) danced in his place with Knox's pair Jenna Johnson.

==== Week 7 (August 13, 2013) ====
- Group dance: "The Gravel Road" from The Village (Contemporary; Choreographer: Christopher Scott)
- Judges: Nigel Lythgoe, Mary Murphy, Debbie Allen

Couple	Style	Music	Choreographer(s)	Result
Amy Yakima; Brandon Bryant	Disco	"I Will Always Love You" (Hex Hector Radio Mix)—Whitney Houston	Doriana Sanchez	Safe
Aaron Turner; Kathryn McCormick	Contemporary	"Kissing You"—Des'Ree	Stacey Tookey	Safe
Du-Shaunt "Fik-shun" Stegall; Melanie Moore	Jazz	"Feeling Good"—Jennifer Hudson	Mandy Moore	Bottom 4
Paul Karmiryan; Witney Carson	Cha-cha-cha	"Live It Up"—Jennifer Lopez	Jean-Marc Généreux	Safe
Hayley Erbert; Stephen "tWitch" Boss	Hip-hop	"Locked Out of Heaven" (District 78 remix)—Bruno Mars	Christopher Scott	Bottom 4
Jenna Johnson; Neil Haskell	Contemporary	"I Can't Make You Love Me"—Mark Masri	Mandy Moore	Eliminated
Jasmine Harper; Marko Germar	Jazz	"Blurred Lines"—Robin Thicke feat. Pharrell & T.I.	Ray Leeper	Safe
~~Makenzie Dustman~~; Jakob Karr	Broadway	"Too Darn Hot"—(RAC mix)—Ella Fitzgerald	Spencer Liff	
~~Nico Greetham~~; Comfort Fedoke	Hip-hop	"Get Ur Freak On" (Amended LP Version)—Missy Elliott	Tabitha and Napoleon D'umo	
Tucker Knox; Robert Roldan	Contemporary	"Medicine"—Daughter	Travis Wall	Eliminated

==== Week 8 (August 20, 2013) ====
- Group dance: "Move to the Ocean" (Baauer remix)—Brick & Mortar (Contemporary; Choreographer: Mia Michaels)
- Judges: Nigel Lythgoe, Mary Murphy, Jenna Elfman
- Solos:

Contestant	Style	Music	Result
Du-shaunt "Fik-shun" Stegall	Hip-Hop	"If You Crump Stand Up"—edIT	Safe
Hayley Erbert	Contemporary	"Skin & Bones"—David J. Roch	Safe
Jenna Johnson	Paso Doble	"Greyhound"—Swedish House Mafia	Eliminated
Tucker Knox	Contemporary	"Beautiful Child"—Rufus Wainwright	Eliminated

- This week, each routine is choreographed by the all-star who's paired with the contestant.

Contestant	Style	Music	Result
Aaron Turner; Chelsie Hightower	Jive	"Great Balls of Fire" from Million Dollar Quartet	Safe
Du-shaunt "Fik-shun" Stegall; Allison Holker	Contemporary	"Skinny Love"—Birdy	Safe
~~Tucker Knox~~; Courtney Galiano	Jazz	"Clarity"—Zedd feat. Foxes	
Paul Karmiryan; Comfort Fedoke	Hip-hop	"Dum Dum"—Tedashii feat. Lecrae	Eliminated
Hayley Erbert; Dmitry Chaplin	Rumba	"Meant"—Elizaveta	Eliminated
~~Jenna Johnson~~; Mark Kanemura	Jazz Funk/Voguing	"I Am the Best"—2NE1	
Jasmine Harper; Stephen "Twitch" Boss	Hip-hop	"The Power"—District 78 feat. Cheesa	Safe
Amy Yakima; Travis Wall	Contemporary	"Wicked Game" (Live at Kilkenny Arts Festival, Ireland 2011)—James Vincent McMorrow	Safe

==== Week 9 (August 27, 2013) ====
- Group dance: "Hlohonolofatsa"—Soweto Gospel Choir (African Jazz; Choreographer: Sean Cheesman)
- Judges: Nigel Lythgoe, Mary Murphy, Jesse Tyler Ferguson
- Solos:

Contestant	Style	Music
Amy Yakima	Contemporary	"Anna's Theme" from The Red Violin
Du-shaunt "Fik-shun" Stegall	Hip-Hop	"Look At Me Now"—Chris Brown feat. Busta Rhymes and Lil Wayne
Jasmine Harper	Jazz	"Outro" (Amazing Grace)—Destiny's Child
Paul Karmiryan	Mambo	"Mamba Negra"—Huecco
Hayley Erbert	Contemporary	"Be Mine!" (Live at the Cherry Treehouse)—Robyn
Aaron Turner	Tap	"Use Me"—Bill Withers

Couple	Style	Music	Choreographers
~~Paul Karmiryan~~; Kathryn McCormick	Jazz	"Tied Up"—Yello	Tyce Diorio
~~Hayley Erbert~~; Joshua Allen	Hip-hop	"Work Hard, Play Hard"—Wiz Khalifa	Tabitha and Napoleon D'umo
Aaron Turner; Melanie Moore	Broadway	"Faith"—George Michael	Spencer Liff
Du-shaunt "Fik-shun" Stegall; Witney Carson	Foxtrot	"Sexy Silk"—Jessie J	Jonathan Roberts
Jasmine Harper; Neil Haskell	Contemporary	"Unfaithful" from Unfaithful	Tyce Diorio
Amy Yakima; Alex Wong	Bollywood	"Munni Badnaam Hui" from Dabangg	Nakul Dev Mahajan
~~Hayley Erbert~~; ~~Paul Karmiryan~~	Contemporary	"I'm Gonna Be (500 Miles)"—Sleeping At Last	Dee Caspary
Amy Yakima; Du-shaunt "Fik-shun" Stegall	Hip-hop	"Lemme See"—Usher feat. Rick Ross	Dave Scott
Jasmine Harper; Aaron Turner	Commercial Jazz	"Mirror Mirror" - Lord KraVen	Sean Cheesman

==== Week 10 (September 3, 2013) ====
- Judges: Nigel Lythgoe, Mary Murphy, Gabby Douglas, Paula Abdul
- Solos:

Contestant	Style	Music
Jasmine Harper	Contemporary	"Ready For Love"—India.Arie
Du-shaunt "Fik-shun" Stegall	Animation	"Gangnam Style"—PSY
Amy Yakima	Contemporary	"Unchained Melody"—The Righteous Brothers
Aaron Turner	Tap	"You and I Both" (Acoustic)—Jason Mraz

Couple	Style	Music	Choreographers
Amy Yakima; Aaron Turner	Jazz	"Primitive"—Richard Vission vs. Luciana	Ray Leeper
Jasmine Harper; Du-shaunt "Fik-shun" Stegall	Contemporary	Spiegel Im Spiegel — Arvo Pärt, performed by Angela Yoffe & Vadim Gluzman	Travis Wall
Aaron Turner; Melinda Sullivan	Tap	"When I Was Your Man"—Bruno Mars	Anthony Morigerato
Jasmine Harper; Comfort Fedoke	Hip-hop	"Run the World (Girls)" (Nappytabs remix)—Beyoncé Knowles	Tabitha and Napoleon D'umo
Amy Yakima; Du-shaunt "Fik-shun" Stegall	Argentine Tango	"Hazardous/Zero Signal"—PP Music	Miriam Larici; Leonardo Barrionuevo
Jasmine Harper; Aaron Turner	Samba	"Can't Touch It" (Radio edit)—Ricki-Lee Coulter	Dmitry Chaplin
Du-shaunt "Fik-shun" Stegall; Stephen "Twitch" Boss	Hip-hop	"Hello Good Morning" (Remix)—Diddy – Dirty Money feat. Nicki Minaj & Rick Ross	Luther Brown
Amy Yakima; Robert Roldan	Contemporary	"Say Something"—A Great Big World	Stacey Tookey
Du-shaunt "Fik-shun" Stegall; Aaron Turner	Broadway	"The Jitters"—Big Bad Voodoo Daddy	Tyce Diorio
Jasmine Harper; Amy Yakima	Jazz	"The Diva Dance"—Éric Serra	Mark Kanemura

==== Week 11 (Finale) (September 10, 2013) ====
- Judges: Nigel Lythgoe, Mary Murphy, Paula Abdul, Adam Shankman, Stephen "twitch" Boss
- Group dances & guest performers:

Contestants and Guest(s)	Style	Music	Choreographer
Top 20	Jazz	"Wonderwall"—Paul Anka	Ivan Koumeav
Dancers from Battle of the Year	B-boying	"Fast Man (Z-Trip Remix)/Know the Ledge"—The PC's Ltd/Eric B. & Rakim	Dave Scott
Top 10 boys	Hip-hop/Contemporary	"Sand"—Nathan Lanier feat. Karen Whipple	Christopher Scott
Top 20	Jazz-Funk	"Puttin' on the Ritz"—Herb Alpert feat. Lani Hall	Tabitha and Napoleon D'umo
Mary Murphy; Nigel Lythgoe	Hip-hop	"Let's Get It On"—Marvin Gaye	Christopher Scott
Movement Box	Beatboxing/Hip-hop	"This Life"—Gene Shinozaki	Themselves
Top 10/All-Stars	Jazz	"Rock Lobster" (District 78 remix)—The B-52's	Tabitha and Napoleon D'umo

===== Judges & grand-finalists' picks =====
Contestants	Style	Music	Choreographer	Chosen by
Makenzie Dustman; Paul Karmiryan	Contemporary	"The Edge of Glory" (Live from A Very Gaga Thanksgiving)—Lady Gaga	Mandy Moore	Paula Abdul
Jasmine Harper; Marko Germar	Jazz	"Blurred Lines"—Robin Thicke, Pharrell Williams & T.I.	Ray Leeper	Herself
Du-shaunt "Fik-shun" Stegall; Stephen "Twitch" Boss	Hip-hop	"Hello Good Morning" (Remix)—Diddy – Dirty Money feat. Nicki Minaj & Rick Ross	Luther Brown	Adam Shankman
Curtis Holland; Alexis Juliano; Aaron Turner	Tap	"You Really Did It" (Live)—Jason Mraz	Anthony Morigerato	Nigel Lythgoe
Hayley Erbert; Nico Greetham	Broadway	"Kiss of the Spider Woman"—Chita Rivera	Sean Cheesman	Stephen "Twitch" Boss
Aaron Turner; Kathryn McCormick	Contemporary	"I'm Kissing You"—Des'ree	Stacey Tookey	Himself
Jasmine Harper; Comfort Fedoke	Hip-hop	"Run the World (Girls)" (Nappytabs remix)—Beyoncé Knowles	Tabitha and Napoleon D'umo	Cat Deeley
Tucker Knox; Robert Roldan	Contemporary	"Medicine"—Daughter	Travis Wall	Mary Murphy
Jenna Johnson; Mark Kanemura	Jazz/Vogue	"I Am the Best"—2NE1	Mark Kanemura	Cat Deeley
Amy Yakima; Du-shaunt "Fik-shun" Stegall	Hip-hop	"After Party"—Dorrough	Tabitha and Napoleon D'umo	Themselves
Amy Yakima; Travis Wall	Contemporary	"Wicked Game" (Live at Kilkenny Arts Festival, Ireland 2011)—James Vincent McMorrow	Travis Wall	Viewers

=== All-Stars dance pool ===
All-stars, contestant partners, and results
Season	Former contestant	Dance styles	Placement	Contestant			
Season	Former contestant	Dance styles	Placement	Week 7	Week 8	Week 9	Week 10
2	Dmitry Chaplin	Ballroom/Latin	Top 10		Hayley		
2	Allison Holker	Contemporary	Top 8		Fik-shun		
2	Travis Wall	Contemporary	Runner-up		Amy		
3	Neil Haskell	Contemporary	Top 3	Jenna		Jasmine H.	
4	Stephen "Twitch" Boss	Hip-hop	Runner-up	Hayley	Jasmine H.		Fik-shun
4	Comfort Fedoke	Hip-hop	Top 8	Nico	Paul		Jasmine H.
4	Courtney Galiano	Contemporary/Jazz	Top 4		Tucker		
4	Chelsie Hightower	Ballroom/Latin	Top 6		Aaron		
4	Mark Kanemura	Jazz	Top 6		Jenna		
4	Joshua Allen	Hip-Hop	Winner			Hayley	
5	Brandon Bryant	Contemporary	Runner-up	Amy			
6	Jakob Karr	Contemporary/Broadway	Runner-up	Makenzie			
6	Kathryn McCormick	Contemporary	Top 3	Aaron		Paul	
7	Robert Roldan	Contemporary	Top 3	Tucker			Amy
7	Melinda Sullivan	Tap	Top 9				Aaron
7	Alex Wong	Ballet	Top 8			Amy	
8	Marko Germar	Contemporary	Top 3	Jasmine H.			
8	Melanie Moore	Contemporary	Winner	Fik-shun		Aaron	
9	Witney Carson	Ballroom/Latin	Top 6	Paul		Fik-Shun	

This contestant was eliminated this week.
This contestant was in the bottom 4 this week.
These two contestants won the competition.

== Ratings ==
=== U.S. Nielsen ratings ===
Show	Episode	First air date	Rating (18–49)	Share (18–49)	Viewers (millions)
1	Auditions: Los Angeles	May 14, 2013	1.9	6	5.12
2	Auditions: Detroit	May 15, 2013	2.3	6	7.01
3	Auditions: Los Angeles and Austin	May 21, 2013	2.0	6	4.66
4	Auditions: Boston	May 28, 2013	1.9	6	5.00
5	Auditions: Memphis	June 4, 2013	1.7	5	4.44
6	Las Vegas Callbacks	June 11, 2013	1.7	5	4.31
7	Meet the Top 20	June 18, 2013	1.4	4	3.86
8	Top 20 Perform (Part 1)	June 25, 2013	1.7	5	4.49
9	Top 20 Perform (Part 2)	July 2, 2013	1.5	5	4.38
10	Top 18 Perform	July 9, 2013	1.5	5	4.41
11	Top 16 Perform	July 23, 2013	1.4	4	4.17
12	Top 14 Perform	July 30, 2013	1.5	5	4.20
13	Top 12 Perform	August 6, 2013	1.4	4	4.11
14	Top 10 Perform	August 13, 2013	1.3	4	3.90
15	Top 8 Perform	August 20, 2013	1.2	4	3.80
16	Top 6 Perform	August 27, 2013	1.3	4	3.98
17	Top 4 Perform	September 3, 2013	1.4	4	4.17
18	Finale	September 10, 2013	1.4	4	4.37

== See also ==
- List of So You Think You Can Dance finalists
