= Julia Powers =

American ballroom dancer and choreographer

Julia Gorchakova Powers
- Born: Russia
- Occupation: Choreographer
- Spouse: Bob Powers (m. 1993)

Julia Powers (née Gorchakova) is a ballroom dance champion and fitness program creator.

== Biography ==
Julia Powers is a Russian-American ballroom dancer, and was born in St. Petersburg, Russia. She received dance instruction from her mother as a child, and danced in Japan and in East Russia as a young woman. In 1991, she moved to Arizona to develop a dance partnership with Bob Powers; they married in 1993.

=== Awards ===
- 12 Times United States Rhythm Champions.
- 3 Times World Professional Mambo Champions
- Finalists, World Latin-American Showdance Championships
- Can-Am Open Professional American Rhythm Champions

=== Television ===
They have been featured on PBS's Championship Ballroom Dancing, GTV DanceSport, as well as The Heritage Classic hosted by Cyd Charisse.

=== Current Projects ===
Powers is an adjudicator with the National Dance Council of America member of the World Dance Arts Foundation, and co-organizer of the Sunburst Ball.

Adjudication Qualifications
International Style Standard
International Style Latin
American Smooth
American Rhythm
Theatrical Style

Powers's latest endeavor is Core Rhythms, which she co-created with another ballroom champion, Jaana Kunitz. Core Rhythms is a Latin-dance-based fitness program, that has been featured on infomercials and QVC, and included endorsements from Mary Murphy of So You Think You Can Dance and Len Goodman & Tony Dovolani of Dancing with the Stars.

The program is led in-person at the Champion Ballroom Academy, in San Diego, California.

Powers is also a clothing designer, creating custom dancewear.

In 2007, Powers returned to the competition floor to compete with Emmanuel Pierre-Antoine.

== See also ==
- U.S. National Dancesport Champions (Professional Rhythm)
- Champion Ballroom Academy
