= Jaana Kunitz =

- Born: Taivalkoski, Finland
- Occupation: Choreographer
- Spouse: James Kunitz

Jaana Kunitz (sometimes Yaana Kunitz, née Reinikka) is a ballroom dancer and fitness program creator.

== Biography ==
Jaana Kunitz, born in Taivalkoski, Finland in 1972, is a professional dance instructor based in San Diego, California. She is married to her dance partner, James Kunitz, and has since retired from competing in ballroom dance competitions to focus on coaching, video production, and dance-fitness programs.

=== Television and film ===
With her husband and dance partner James Kunitz, she has appeared on television programs such as PBS Championship Ballroom Dancing, NBC DanceSport Series, Goodlife TV, and ESPN. They also appeared as featured Latin-dance finalists in the film Dance with Me, starring Vanessa L. Williams.

She has produced numerous instructional videos, including Samba: Funky Moves with James & Jaana Kunitz.

=== Fitness programs ===
Jaana's latest endeavor is Core Rhythms, which she co-created with another ballroom champion, Julia Gorchakova. Core Rhythms is a Latin-dance-based fitness program, that has been featured on pay-per-view programs and QVC, and included endorsements from Mary Murphy of So You Think You Can Dance and Len Goodman & Tony Dovolani of Dancing with the Stars.

The program is led in-person at the Champion Ballroom Academy, in San Diego, California.

Jaana and James have created a new program called Figure 8.

== See also ==
- U.S. National Dancesport Champions (Professional Latin)
- Champion Ballroom Academy
