= Mikey Wax =

American singer-songwriter

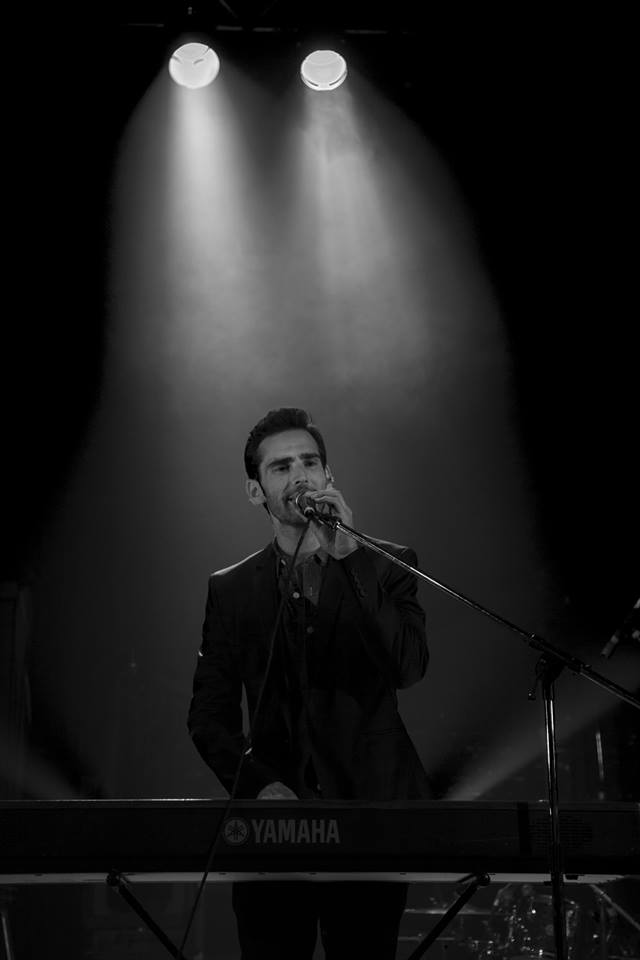
- Mikey Wax Live In Toronto 06/18/2014

Background information
- Also known as: Middle Child
- Born: Michael Ross Wax
- Origin: Syosset, New York, United States
- Genres: Pop rock; acoustic; indie
- Occupations: Singer-songwriter; musician
- Instruments: Vocals; piano; guitar
- Labels: Toucan Cove (2014–2016); Independent (2016–present)
- Website: Official website

Mikey Wax, (also known as Middle Child) is an American pianist, guitarist and singer-songwriter. He is best known for his singles “Counting on You” and "You Lift Me Up".

== Early life and education ==
Mikey Wax grew up on Long Island, New York, and started playing piano at the age of 8. Upon graduating from high school, Wax attended Vanderbilt University in Nashville, Tennessee.

== Career ==
His debut single "In Case I Go Again" was released in 2008, along with his album Change Again, which featured the single. The single was featured on television programs such as Pretty Little Liars, Ghost Whisperer, The Real World, and NBC’s coverage of the 2012 Summer Olympics.

In 2011, Wax released his second independent album, Constant Motion. The album was ranked at #47 on Billboard’s Heatseekers chart and #6 on the iTunes singer/songwriter chart in the US. The album’s single "Counting on You" was used as the elimination montage song for season nine of the US version of So You Think You Can Dance.

In 2012, Wax was recognized by New Music Seminar as an "Artist on the Verge." In the same year, he was also featured by iHeartRadio as an "Artist To Watch".

In 2012, Wax also released the Christmas song "And A Happy New Year." The song was featured on the television series Switched at Birth.

In 2014, Wax's single "You Lift Me Up" debuted on the iTunes US Top 200 Pop Chart. and was also featured on iTunes’ "Ahead of the Curve" list. The New York-based EDM duo Live City also produced a dance remix of the song, which premiered on BPM station. "You Lift Me Up" has been used on episodes of MTV's The Real World and The Challenge: Battle of the Exes II. "You Lift Me Up" was also used in a commercial for Keeping Up With The Kardashians on E! Entertainment, and in FOX Sports’ coverage of NBA games. "You Lift Me Up" was co-written by Wax and his brother Jonathan Wax.

In September 2014, Wax was chosen as a featured artist by the karaoke and music app Smule. In October, he was named Artist of the Month by American Airlines. Wax's song "Drive On" was written and recorded for the film The Road Within.

Wax premiered his new single "Love Always Wins (#LoveWins)", inspired by marriage equality. In the same month, it was announced that the song would be featured in promos for E! Entertainment's docuseries about Caitlyn Jenner, titled I Am Cait. On September 11, 2015, Wax was the featured artist performing on the AOL’s Build Series. Wax's song "Walking On Air" was featured on MTV's Finding Carter in November 2015. In 2015, Wax's songs “Perfect Holiday” and “Catch the Midnight Flight” were featured in the film A Dogwalker's Christmas Tale.

"You Lift Me Up" was played in the background during TBS's coverage of NCAA March Madness for the 2015–16 NCAA Division I men's basketball season. In 2016, Wax also released his new single "Helium." The song was featured in a Hollister Co. online commercial.

In June, 2017, Wax released the single "Never Letting You Go.” In October, 2017, Wax released the single “Spaceman,” which was produced by Stash Konig. The song was featured in a Nike, Inc Swim ad.

On June 15, 2018, Wax released the single 'Big Little Life'. In an interview with All Access, Wax revealed that the song would be featured on the season finale of the television series Born This Way. On June 21, 2019, Wax released his single "Do You Believe Me." The song was featured in season 8 of Teen Mom. In August, 2019 pop singer Midlo released the single "Emotional," which was co-written by Wax.

Wax's song "My Heart Knows Where To Go" was featured in the show Heartland in September 2019, and in one of the show's promos. In February 2021, Wax's single "Helium" was featured in a commercial for hospitality sales for the 2022 FIFA World Cup in Qatar.

On May 13, 2021, Wax released the single 'Burn Out' under the new stage-name Middle Child, alongside producer Jacob Lee.

Wax has performed on tour with artists such as Andy Grammer, Howie Day,Tyler Ward, Rachel Platten,Matt Wertz,Parachute, Ryan Cabrera, Tyler Hilton, Teddy Geiger, Jon McLaughlin, and Tony Lucca, among others. Wax has been known to play the piano and guitar simultaneously.

== Discography ==
=== Albums ===
Title	Year	Label
Change Again	2008	Mikey Wax / WaxSongs, Inc
The Traveler (EP)	2010	Mikey Wax / WaxSongs, Inc
For Better or Worse (EP)	2010	Mikey Wax / WaxSongs, Inc
Constant Motion	2011	Mikey Wax / WaxSongs, Inc
And a Happy New Year (EP)	2012	Mikey Wax / WaxSongs, Inc
Mikey Wax	2014	Toucan Cove/Universal

=== Singles ===
Title	Year	Comments
In Case I Go Again	2008	Debut single
Counting on You	2012	International Songwriting Competition finalist
You Lift Me Up	2014	
Only One	2015	
Love Always Wins (#LoveWins)	2015	
Bottle of Jack	2016	
Helium	2016	
Never Letting You Go	2017	
Spaceman	2017	Produced by Stash Konig
Big Little Life	2018	
Do You Believe Me	2019	
My Heart Knows Where To Go	2019	
Stay Together (feat. Renata Baiocco)	2020	
Burn Out	2021	First single as Middle Child
