= Tabitha and Napoleon D'umo =

American married choreographers

Napoleon and Tabitha D'umo
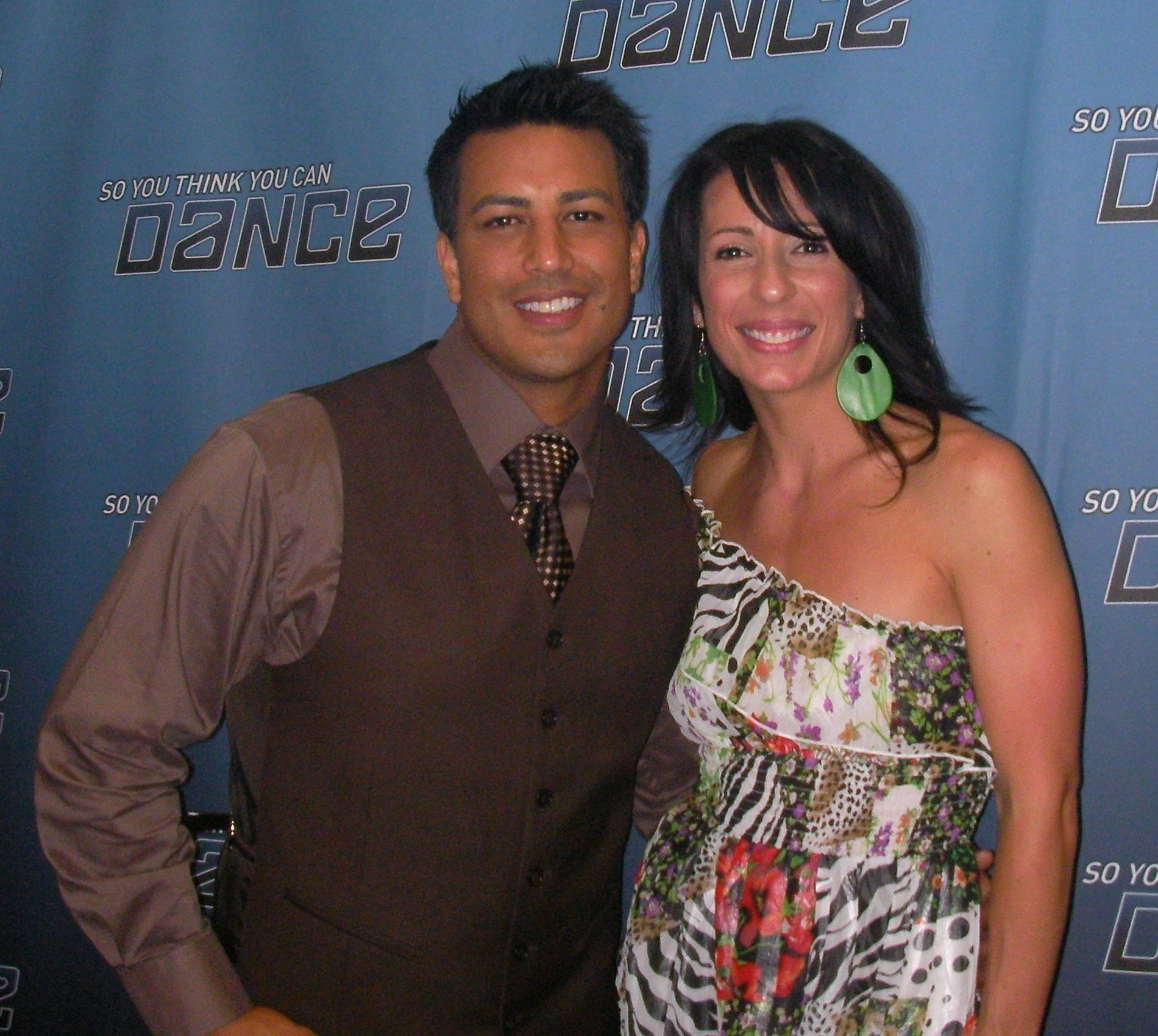
- Backstage after the So You Think You Can Dance season-four finale
- Other name: Nappytabs
- Education: University of Nevada, Las Vegas
- Occupations: Choreographers, dance teachers, creative directors, entrepreneurs
- Years active: 1996–present
- Agent: McDonald Selznick Associates Mass Movement
- Known for: Developing lyrical hip-hop
- Children: 1
- Awards: Outstanding Choreography – Primetime Emmy Award; 2014 So You Think You Can Dance; Outstanding Choreography – Primetime Emmy Award; 2011 So You Think You Can Dance

Tabitha A. D'umo (née Cortopassi) and Napoleon Buddy D'umo, known together as Nappytabs, are Emmy Award-winning married choreographers. They are best known for their choreography on the television show So You Think You Can Dance and for being supervising choreographers and executive producers of America's Best Dance Crew. Since being with the former, their choreography has received both praise and criticism. They own Nappytabs urban dancewear and have been working in the dance industry since 1996.

Tabitha and Napoleon grew up on opposite coasts of the United States and met in the early 1990s as students at the University of Nevada, Las Vegas. They began their dance career together while still in college by choreographing industrial musicals for large corporations with the hip-hop dance company Culture Shock. After moving to Los Angeles in 1999, they started teaching hip-hop classes at the Edge Performing Arts Center. They took additional jobs choreographing for professional sports dance teams and back-up dancing for musical artists. In 2003, they joined the faculty of Monsters of Hip Hop dance convention.

Their work was introduced to mainstream audiences in 2008 when they became supervising choreographers on America's Best Dance Crew and resident choreographers on So You Think You Can Dance. It was on the later show that their lyrical hip-hop choreography style gained exposure. The pair's career progressed to providing creative direction for tours and live events by Christina Aguilera, Ricky Martin, Celine Dion, and Jennifer Lopez. They continued to develop their dancewear line by breaking out of its previously online-only presence and opening a physical store location in 2010.

From television and concerts, their move into theater occurred gradually. In 2010, they directed the JabbaWockeeZ's MÜS.I.C. stage show and began to work with Cirque du Soleil; they choreographed Viva Elvis and were contributing choreographers for Michael Jackson: The Immortal World Tour. They continued to establish themselves in television as choreographers for Madonna's Super Bowl halftime performance. By 2015, they had choreographed several K-pop music videos for artists such as TVXQ, EXO, and BoA. Aside from their choreography, creative direction, and dancewear line, Tabitha and Napoleon continue to teach hip-hop classes at dance studios and on the convention circuit. They have also been involved with charity work for organizations that support the arts.

== Life and career ==
=== 1968–1996: Early life and education ===
Napoleon was raised in Victorville, California as one of three siblings. He learned b-boying, locking, and popping by traveling to Los Angeles and frequenting the b-boy scene; he was eventually cast as an extra in the movie Breakin' 2: Electric Boogaloo in 1984. After Napoleon graduated from Apple Valley High School, he joined the army and worked as a surgeon's assistant while stationed in Germany. Once discharged, he attended the University of Nevada, Las Vegas (UNLV) where he majored in molecular biology and started taking jazz and modern dance classes.

Tabitha grew up as an only child in Galloway Township, New Jersey. Her mother enrolled her in jazz dance classes when she was young. Since there were no hip-hop classes, Tabitha learned by watching music videos and participating in her school's cheer and dance teams. She cites Michael Jackson, Janet Jackson, and Paula Abdul as influences. While cheerleading at Absegami High School, Tabitha earned "All-American" status at an NCA camp and got the opportunity to perform in the Aloha Bowl in Hawaii. After Tabitha graduated, she moved to Nevada in 1991 to attend UNLV where she majored in communications and started taking formal hip-hop dance classes. It was there at a party that she met Napoleon.

While hanging out with her cheerleading and dance team friends, Tabitha invited Napoleon and his body building friends to come to a casual practice session and do stunt work with them. Napoleon and his friends eventually attended a formal practice session on campus, and the cheerleading coach was so impressed with their work that they all received full scholarships to join the team. Tabitha and Napoleon started dating in 1994, but their professional partnership and dance career did not start until 1996 when they began teaching hip-hop classes together at the Las Vegas Athletic Club. Since the beginning of their career, they have always worked together including their first choreography job and the first dance class they taught.

=== 1996–2007: Early career, dancewear, and creative directing ===
While Tabitha and Napoleon were still in college, they were accepted into the dance company Culture Shock where they met members of the JabbaWockeeZ before the JabbaWockeeZ became a crew. In addition to going to school and being a part of Culture Shock, they both maintained part-time jobs. Together they worked at Bunker Dance Center in Las Vegas teaching hip-hop classes. Separately Napoleon worked as a personal trainer and Tabitha worked at the Rio Hotel and Casino. While dancing with Culture Shock, Tabitha created demo reels of the company to send to event organizers who were having conventions in Las Vegas. Tabitha and Napoleon used this method to book choreography jobs and it was during this time that they honed their lyrical hip-hop style. Through Culture Shock, they were hired to choreograph several industrial musicals for casinos and corporations such as Nike, Levi, Redken, Matrix Hair, and MAC. They eventually worked their way up from company dancers to become the artistic directors. As Tabitha and Napoleon's college graduation was approaching they decided to change their plans from a job in public relations and medical school respectively to a career in the dance industry.

Tabitha and Napoleon were married April 19, 1998. In 1999, they moved to Los Angeles to expand their opportunities. Upon arriving in L.A., they taught hip-hop classes at the Edge Performing Arts Center. They found extra work as back-up dancers for Beyoncé, Toni Braxton, Missy Elliott, Monica, Timbaland, Sisqó, and Destiny's Child whom they went on tour with in 2002.

Their move from dancing into choreography occurred gradually. Jobs included choreographing performances for NFL and NBA dance teams including the Dallas Cowboys, Denver Broncos, Chicago Bulls, and Orlando Magic. In November 2002, they made the cover of Dance Spirit magazine. They were profiled with seven other choreographers and interviewed about what it takes to make it as a dancer in Los Angeles. In 2003, Napoleon started teaching classes with Monsters of Hip Hop dance convention. Tabitha joined him later and they are still permanent faculty members to this day.

The original Nappytabs dancewear logo.

In 2005, Tabitha and Napoleon started Nappytabs dancewear. They cite the lack of appropriate dancewear for the hip-hop dance community as inspiration for the company. Early in its production, Tabitha sewed the clothes herself. The Nappytabs logo began as a yin and yang like symbol with an "n" and a "t" overlapping in the middle. The word itself—Nappytabs—is a combination of Napoleon (Nappy) and Tabitha's (Tab) nicknames. Contrary to popular belief, the name 'Nappytabs' started as their clothing line first. They did not call themselves Nappytabs, and the word being a nickname to refer to both of them did not start until they became choreographers on So You Think You Can Dance.

Tabitha and Napoleon began creative directing stage shows and concerts in the mid-2000s. In 2006, they served as assistant directors for Christina Aguilera's Back to Basics Tour. In 2007, they were also assistant directors for Ricky Martin's Black and White Tour. Both tours were directed by Jamie King who is known primarily for his work with Madonna.

The same year, Tabitha appeared in two fitness DVDs. She was the host/instructor of Drop it with Dance. The video is split into six 10-minute routines that gradually increase in difficulty; movements from all six routines are combined in the finale "Showtime" segment. She also appeared in Rock Your Body, which was hosted by Jamie King.

=== 2008–2009: Dance shows and mainstream exposure ===
Tabitha and Napoleon became supervising choreographers for the inaugural season of America's Best Dance Crew in 2008. They were responsible for choreographing group routines, coming up with dance challenges, and assisting the crews as needed with polishing their performances. Also in 2008, they took on hosting duties for Rock the Reception. On the show, they created wedding dances for engaged couples and their wedding party to perform at the reception. The participants were real life couples with no dance experience. In addition to America's Best Dance Crew and Rock the Reception, they joined the choreography and judging team on the fourth season of So You Think You Can Dance. It was on this show that their lyrical hip-hop choreography style gained mainstream exposure.

Lyrical hip-hop is a fluid and more interpretive version of standard hip-hop often danced to downtempo rap music or R&B music. The term itself was coined by choreographer and producer Adam Shankman in reference to a routine choreographed by Tabitha and Napoleon to Leona Lewis' song "Bleeding Love". "Bleeding Love" was nominated for a 2009 Emmy Award for Outstanding Choreography. After the season ended, Tabitha and Napoleon directed the 2008 So You Think You Can Dance Tour. They continued creative directing several other concerts throughout the remainder of the year.

They teamed up with Jamie King again and served as assistant directors for Celine Dion's Taking Chances Tour. They directed Monsters of Hip Hop: The Show and America's Best Dance Crew Live which featured dance crews JabbaWockeeZ, Super Cr3w, Fanny Pak, ASIID, and Breaksk8. OMG! gave the concert a positive review stating that the five crews represented a good mix of styles and that the concert brought the best parts of the show to the stage.

In January 2009, the Nappytabs dancewear website launched which began the start of online clothing sales. The first version of their website was designed and maintained by Ryan Cyphert's 3nine Design media company. Cyphert is also a professional dancer and a colleague of Tabitha and Napoleon. At the time the website launched they all were faculty members at Shock the Intensive dance convention. When Tabitha and Napoleon joined So You Think You Can Dance, dancers on the show, as well as on America's Best Dance Crew and Dancing With the Stars, were already wearing their clothing line during rehearsals. Some of the sponsors were not happy about it and wanted to cover the Nappytabs logo on the clothing. In response to this, judge and executive producer Nigel Lythgoe decided to start calling Tabitha and Napoleon "Nappytabs" during the show so that viewers who looked them up on Google would find their store's website.

In April 2009, Tabitha and Napoleon choreographed two couples' routines and a group routine for the second season of So You Think You Can Dance Australia. The "Arab Money" hip-hop routine they choreographed received positive reviews from the judges but their "Dead and Gone" lyrical hip-hop routine, which was performed later on the same episode, received the most praise. Bonnie Lythgoe called it the "top routine of the night". Jason Coleman added "the choreography [was] absolutely spectacular" and Matt Lee said it was "...probably the best routine in the series." While in Australia, Tabitha and Napoleon were judges at the 2009 Australian Hip Hop Championships in Sydney.

Tabitha and Napoleon choreographed several television specials later in the year. In September, they choreographed the opening dance sequence on the season seven premiere of The Ellen DeGeneres Show. The routine featured both DeGeneres and the top ten dancers from season five of So You Think You Can Dance. At the 61st Primetime Emmy Awards, they choreographed a routine honoring dance that featured Karina Smirnoff and Maksim Chmerkovskiy from Dancing With The Stars; Katee Shean, Mark Kanemura, and Joshua Allen from So You Think You Can Dance; and four members of Quest Crew—the winners of season three of America's Best Dance Crew. They finished the year with choreography for Carrie Underwood's All-Star Holiday Special and Jennifer Lopez' performance on Dick Clark's New Year's Rockin' Eve with Ryan Seacrest.

=== 2010–2011: Stage productions and brand expansion ===
In 2010, Tabitha and Napoleon returned to So You Think You Can Dance (SYTYCD) for season seven and started to work with four different productions of Cirque du Soleil. In February, they provided choreography for Cirque du Soleil's Viva Elvis show at the Aria hotel in Las Vegas. They also choreographed a Viva Elvis guest appearance on Dancing with the Stars.

On SYTYCD, they choreographed routines for the contestants as well as one guest performance for the cast of Cirque du Soleil's Beatles Love. They worked with Love again at the NHL awards and with their sister Cirque productions Kà, for a guest performance on America's Got Talent, and Mystère, for a guest performance on Lopez Tonight. After SYTYCD ended, they appeared as guest choreographers on the Ukrainian version of the show called Everybody Can Dance!/Танцюють всі!.

External videos
- John Gillette's "All Bad" music video.

Aside from choreography, Tabitha and Napoleon continued to develop and expand their dancewear line. In May, they opened the Nappytabs store and dance studio in the North Hollywood Arts District. Although they design their own clothing, they commissioned some print and t-shirt designs from Alex Lodermeier who has also designed for Propr, a clothing line owned by Ben Harper, David Arquette, and David Bedwell. Through Nappytabs, they also started to sponsor The Pulse on Tour dance convention and the Industry Voice online newsletter. Their clothing appears in independent R&B singer John Gillette's music video "All Bad". Tabitha was a featured dancer in the video and Napoleon made a cameo appearance at the end.

Also in May, the JabbaWockeeZ' MÜS.I.C. (pronounced MUSE-i-see) stage show, which Tabitha and Napoleon directed, opened at the MGM Grand Las Vegas hotel. MÜS.I.C. was the first hip-hop dance stage show on the Las Vegas Strip. The show was 90 minutes long involving dancing, comedy, and magic. In October, MÜS.I.C. moved to the Monte Carlo Resort and Casino. At the Monte Carlo premiere, the JabbaWockeeZ brought Tabitha on stage for a cameo appearance.

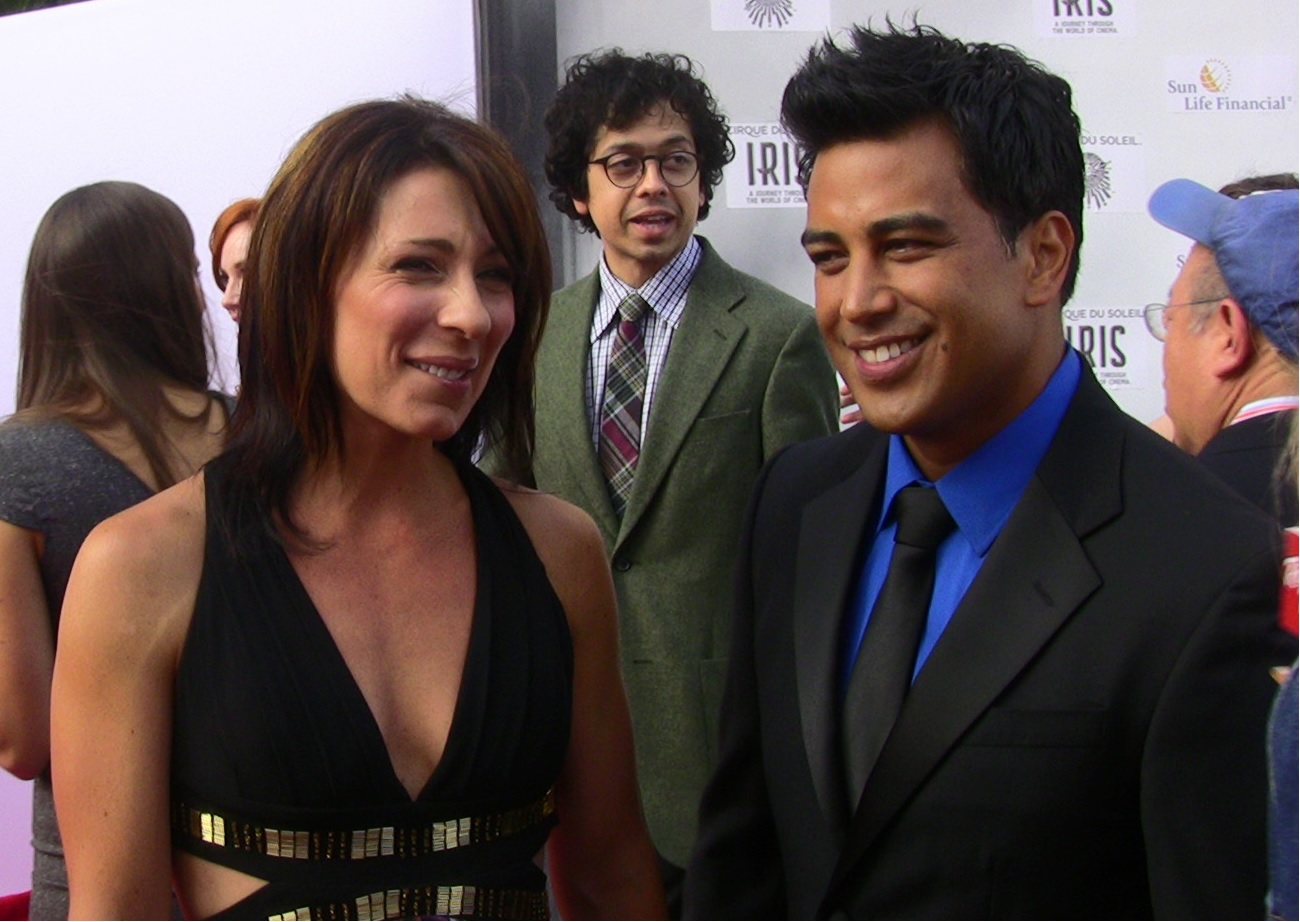
Tabitha and Napoleon in 2011 at the world premiere of Iris by Cirque du Soleil.

In February 2011, Tabitha and Napoleon made their music video directorial debut with the song "All These Boys" by Jasmine Villegas. Unlike John Gillette's "All Bad" they did not dance or appear in the video, but they did serve as the choreographers. In the Spring, they returned to working in television with two projects. At the invitation of Nigel Lythgoe, they joined the production crew on the tenth season of American Idol as staging and creative directors, a position they continued to hold for season 11. They also choreographed the Howie Mandel-produced television show Mobbed which premiered after American Idol on March 31, 2011. The pilot episode was actually shot in September 2010, but after drawing 10.8 million views it was picked up as a series.

In April 2011, they started work on the film Make Your Move starring Derek Hough from Dancing With the Stars and K-pop singer BoA Kwon. Their relationship with BoA extended past the production of the film when they choreographed the music video for her song "Only One"—the title track from her seventh studio album. Due to scheduling conflicts with the production of Make Your Move, Tabitha and Napoleon did not return to America's Best Dance Crew as supervising choreographers for season six. When filming was complete, they did return to Cirque du Soleil as two of ten choreographers for Michael Jackson: The Immortal World Tour. Like other stage shows they've worked on in the past, this one was directed by Jamie King. Christmas 2011 brought personal changes as Napoleon announced on their Twitter page that Tabitha was pregnant.

=== 2012–2016: Music videos, K-pop, and Las Vegas residencies ===
Tabitha and Napoleon spent the beginning of 2012 apart. While Tabitha was choreographing Madonna's halftime performance for Super Bowl XLVI, Napoleon was shooting more scenes for Make Your Move and scouting for the seventh season of America's Best Dance Crew. Although they never returned to America's Best Dance Crew as supervising choreographers, they did return in season eight as co-executive producers After the Super Bowl, Tabitha worked with Madonna again. She choreographed her music video "Girl Gone Wild" which featured all-male Ukrainian dance troupe Kazaky. During the last months of the year, Tabitha and Napoleon continued to work with K-pop artists. They choreographed the music videos "Humanoids" by TVXQ and "I Got A Boy" by Girls' Generation. TVXQ, Girls' Generation, and BoA are all signed to S. M. Entertainment.

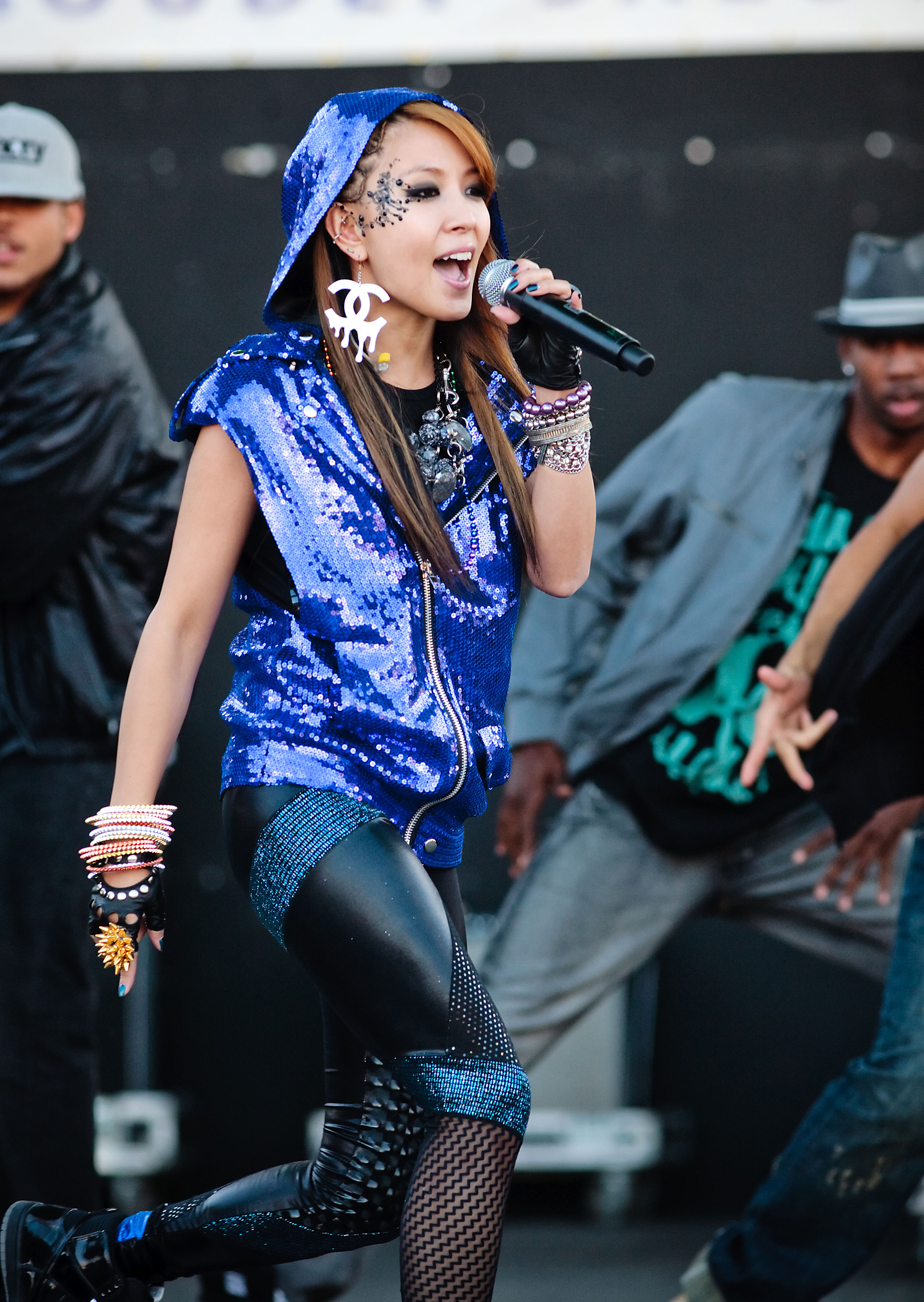
K-pop singer BoA performing in 2009 at San Francisco Pride.

In April 2013, Tabitha and Napoleon choreographed the music video "Puttin' on the Ritz" by Herb Alpert. Two months later, they recreated the video on SYTYCD as the opening routine for season ten's Top 20 performance episode. Yahoo! Music called the performance "absolutely epic". Like the video, it was also shot in one take and several people made cameo appearances including Sean Cheesman, Travis Wall, Chris Scott, Mary Murphy, Jason Gilkison, Nigel Lythgoe, Herb Alpert, Lani Hall, and Tabitha and Napoleon themselves.

In February 2014, Tabitha and Napoleon teamed up with TVXQ again to choreograph their music video "Spellbound"—the title track from their seventh album. Just like Alpert's "Puttin' on the Ritz", the video was shot in one take. Billboard gave the video a positive review: "The duo makes a strong case for 2014's best choreography in the [Spellbound] video." Tabitha and Napoleon also choreographed Super Junior-M's music video "Swing"—the title track from their third EP. They briefly returned to the stage as directors for sibling ballroom dancers Derek and Julianne Hough's Move Live on Tour.

After the Move tour, Tabitha and Napoleon continued to work on music videos. They choreographed Ed Sheeran's music video for the single "Thinking Out Loud". Since its premiere, the video has amassed over 1.5 billion views.

They directed and choreographed the music video for "Harlem Hopscotch", the first single from Maya Angelou's posthumous poetry album Caged Bird Songs. The video premiered December 23, 2014, on Oprah.com and features cameo appearances by Derek Hough and actress Zendaya.

The beginning of 2015 marked a return to K-pop. They choreographed BoA's "Kiss My Lips" and EXO's "Call Me Baby" and "Monster". Afterward, they directed and choreographed Mariah Carey's Number 1's residency at Caesars Palace hotel and re-choreographed Beatles Love at the Mirage Resort and Casino.

=== 2017–present: World of Dance ===
Tabitha and Napoleon serve as co-executive producers and supervising choreographers for World of Dance (WOD), a television show based on the hip-hop dance competition of the same name. This project will serve as a continuation of a long professional partnership they've had with Jennifer Lopez; her company Nuyorican Productions is developing the show. Tabitha and Napoleon worked with Lopez in 2009 when they choreographed her performance at the American Music Awards. They choreographed her 2011 music video "Papi", her 2014 A.K.A. promotional tour, and her 2016 All I Have residency at the Planet Hollywood Resort & Casino. Tabitha and Napoleon's relationship with WOD goes back to 2014 when they were judges at the competition's Los Angeles tour stop. They were working on Britney: Domination, Britney Spears's Las Vegas residency, but their work was put on hold because of the singer going into a hiatus to take care of her father.

== Choreography style ==
=== Artistry ===
Tabitha and Napoleon's choreography is primarily hip-hop; however, it varies across genres depending on what project they're working on. For example, on America's Best Dance Crew all of the group routines they choreographed were hip-hop. However, on So You Think You Can Dance (SYTYCD) they choreographed a few jazz routines and on Cirque du Soleil their work incorporated acro. In general, their choreography emphasizes big visuals, which they attribute to their cheerleading past, and is "...largely centered on storytelling and physical comedy." Inspiration for lifts is taken from lucha libre, adagio, and swing dance. The style they are most known for is lyrical hip-hop.

=== Lyrical hip-hop ===
Lyrical dance is a studio-based dance style that uses a combination of classical dance techniques from jazz and ballet to tell a story through movement. With jazz and ballet, technique alone can provide a good performance but in lyrical dance expressing emotion is emphasized just as much as technique. Hip-hop is an urban dance style that is characterized as hard-hitting involving isolations—moving certain body parts independently from others—and musicality, the body's sensitivity to changes in music. Hip-hop can incorporate movement from its substyles locking, breaking, popping, and boogaloo to add a different movement quality but conveying emotion does not have to be present as the dance is more about bravado and personal enjoyment. Lyrical hip-hop is a fluid and more interpretive version of standard hip-hop. It combines the nuances of lyrical dance with the vocabulary and foundational movements found in hip-hop. According to Dance Spirit magazine, what differentiates lyrical hip-hop from standard hip-hop is that dancers interpret the beat differently. In lyrical hip-hop there are still isolations, gliding, and body waves just like in standard hip-hop. However, the movements are smoother and more fluid rather than hard-hitting and, like lyrical dance, emphasis is placed on storytelling and conveying emotion through the choreography.

"This is one of the great things about this show is that we've really explored a totally new thing which is lyrical hip-hop and [Tabitha and Napoleon] nail it... It shows you that hip-hop [has] completely become a really legitimate beautiful genre in and of its own and you can tell such beautiful and heart breaking stories."

— Adam Shankman

Lyrical hip-hop first gained mainstream exposure, and its name, in 2008 on season four of SYTYCD. The term itself is credited to Adam Shankman, a choreographer and judge on the program, who made a comment in reference to a routine choreographed by Tabitha and Napoleon D'umo to Leona Lewis' song "Bleeding Love". Due to Shankman's comment and their subsequent work on seasons four through seven, Tabitha and Napoleon are credited with developing this style.

Some hip-hop purists feel the interpretive and softer approach means lyrical hip-hop is not hip-hop at all. From a purist perspective, dancing to the lyrics would make the choreography linear and too technical. This is because dancing to the words would take precedence over dancing to the beat. Traditionally in hip-hop, dancing to the beat is essential; lyrics can accent the movement, but the beat is the guiding force for the dancing. Other hip-hop dancers, such as choreographer Shane Sparks, believe that lyrical hip-hop is hip-hop but not different enough for it to have a separate label or be in its own subgenre.

=== Teaching ===
Although Tabitha and Napoleon have a solid career in choreography and creative direction, they spend a significant amount of time teaching classes at dance studios and conventions. They have stated that teaching helps their choreography because it keeps them current on new hip-hop social dances (party dances). They are faculty members at Monsters of Hip Hop dance convention. In the past they have taught at Shock the Intensive, the Edge Performing Arts Center, Millennium Dance Complex, Hip Hop International, Dance Blitz, Seattle Theater Group, Coastal Dance Rage, the Dance Teacher Web Conference and Expo, Teen Dance Company of the Bay Area, JUMP, Xtreme Dance Force, ProDance, Triple Threat Dance, Project 818, Boogiezone, iHollywood, the So You Think You Can Dance Experience, DANCE! The Convention, the Hollywood Summer Tour, Velocity, Radix, The Zoo, and VIP Dance Events.

== Critical reception ==
=== JabbaWockeeZ ===
The JabbaWockeeZ performed the show MÜS.I.C. from May 2010 to September 2012. Over the course of their two-year run, the show received mixed reviews. For their second show PRiSM they signed a six-year deal which included building a new 830-seat theater in a space that used to house a motion-simulator ride. Upon opening, PRiSM was met with positive reviews. Tabitha and Napoleon directed both shows.

==== MÜS.I.C. ====
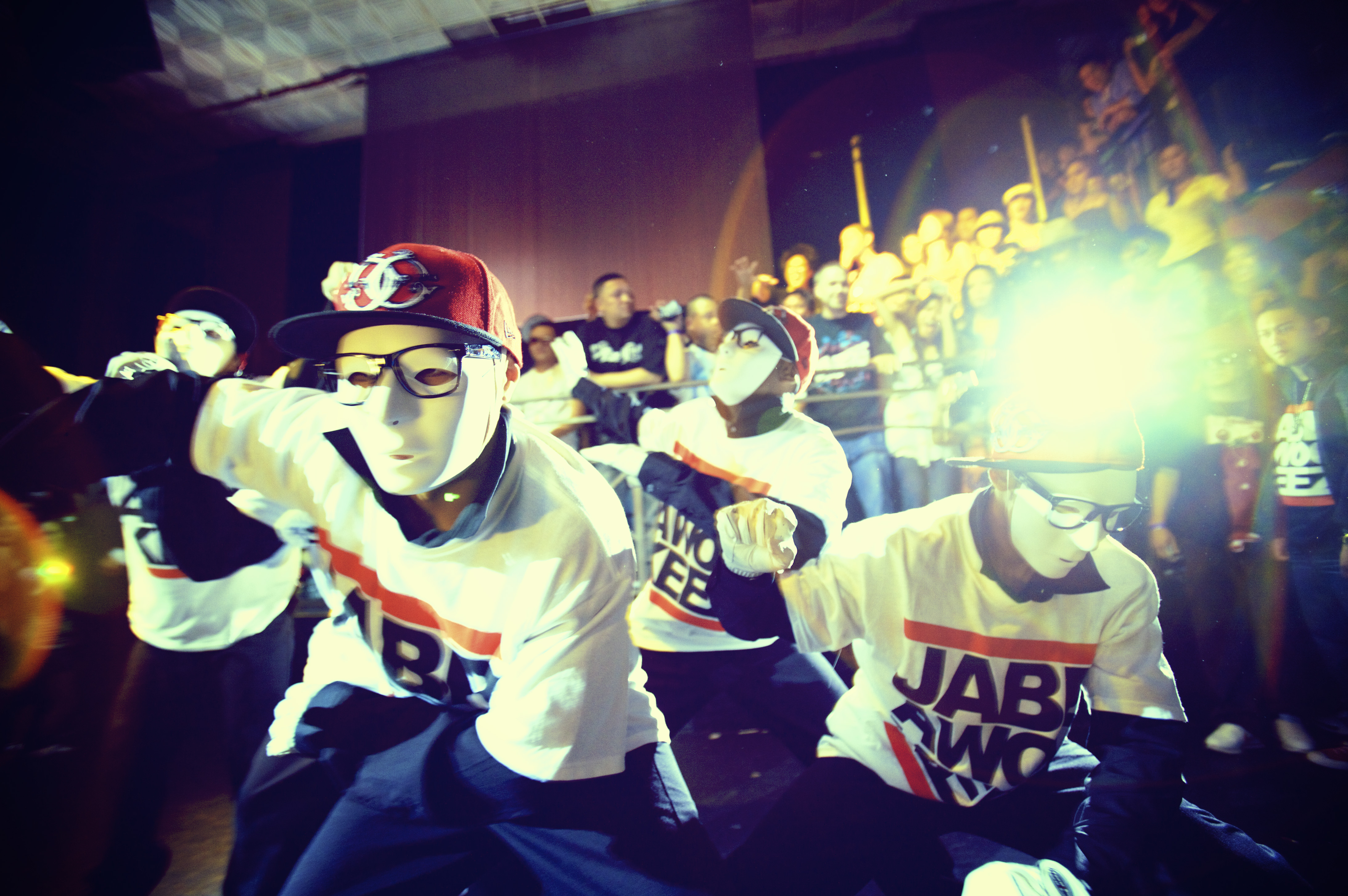
The JabbaWockeeZ performing in 2008 at Vivid Nightclub in San Jose, CA.

The first run of MÜS.I.C. was held at the MGM Grand Las Vegas hotel and casino. Las Vegas Weekly wrote that MÜS.I.C. had "game-changing potential" because it was the first time hip-hop dance had headlined a show on the Las Vegas Strip. In contrast, the Las Vegas Review-Journal (LVRJ) criticized the show for being repetitious and for having a bare stage for the first 20 minutes. LVRJ also criticized the use of masks as not appealing to a casual viewer because it inhibited the dancers' personality: "Even if a generational split is in play here, it would be tough to hear the creators argue that the show would suffer if, after 20 minutes or so -- gasp! -- makeup or clown-face replaced the masks to expand the original concept." In October 2010, the show moved to the Monte Carlo Resort and Casino. Changes to the original show included a bigger stage, a new set, and added dance routines. CraveOnline.com called the new show "amazing" and Zap2It.com described it as "a vibrant, frenetic and multi-genre extravaganza of visuals, sound and movement."

In April 2012, the Jabbawockeez began running two MÜS.I.C. shows in tandem. Some members stayed with the flagship show in Las Vegas while the others took the show on limited residencies elsewhere. Their first residency outside Las Vegas was in Australia at the Jupiters Hotel and Casino in Gold Coast, Queensland. Gold Coast Magazine gave the show a good review describing it as "magical... it truly does stir an emotional response through your soul and the combination of dance and drama make it appealing to all ages." After leaving Jupiters, the Jabbawockeez took up a second month-long residency in August 2012 at Harrah's Resort Atlantic City casino in New Jersey. Philly.com gave it a lukewarm review: "The problem is that as good as Jabbawockeez is at what [they do], the novelty wears off about a third-way through the show... the bulk of the performance pretty much offers little more than variations on a theme. As such, Jabbawockeez would have much more impact as a featured act in a variety show than it has on its own." The members that stayed in Las Vegas temporarily moved into an 800-seat tent outside the Monte Carlo to continue their show. VegasChatter.com reviewed the tent show and called it "an entertaining, fun, and interactive performance show." They performed in the tent from June 2012 through September 2012 with the understanding they would take up residence in the Luxor Las Vegas hotel and casino in the Spring of 2013.

==== PRiSM ====
The JabbaWockeeZ second stage show PRiSM opened at the Luxor Las Vegas on May 31, 2013. The show's original title was Nonsense (a nod to the crew's name) because, at the time, they lacked a cohesive theme. However, it was Napoleon's idea to change the title to PRiSM since there are seven crew members and when light goes into a prism, seven colors emerge (the Luxor hotel is in the shape of a triangular prism). From that point on, unity and color became the themes of the show and the title was given the backronym Painting Reality in a Spectrum of Movement.

PRiSM received positive reviews. Las Vegas Weekly wrote "Those who deride the art of pantomime or breakdancing need to check this show out. It will change your mind." Las Vegas Sun (LVS) described the show as "a mix of great choreography, interesting storylines and special effects reminiscent of Electric Daisy Carnival...". LVS wrote "It's great to see a different kind of headliner — in content and ethnic makeup — thriving on the Strip." Vegas Kool stated that the new theater "...is laid out [so] everyone has a great view of the stage." Las Vegas Review-Journal (LVRJ) directly addressed Tabitha and Napoleon's involvement in "...turning the Jabbawockeez brand into an oddly endearing mix of mime, modern dance and physical theater."

Several reviewers noted that overall PRiSM is better than MÜS.I.C. LVRJ wrote "...it all seems to hang together better this time, with a seamless flow and unifying themes of brotherhood and diversity." Dance Track Magazine wrote "Not only does the show have a much more intimate feel than previous Jabbawockeez shows, but PRiSM also includes increased audience participation, intensified humor and a storyline that is dramatic and flows through the entire performance." IGoShows.com had the same observation: "...the [previous] shows were plagued by lost opportunities, undeveloped ideas, and repetition. They seem to have corrected these shortcomings. 'Prism' is better in almost every way over its predecessors. The show has a cohesiveness that it never had before, good follow-through on ideas, and far more intriguing staging. The choreography is strong, varied, and doesn't suffer the repetition that had invaded it previously."

=== So You Think You Can Dance ===
Most criticism of Tabitha and Napoleon's choreography has come as a result of their work on So You Think You Can Dance (SYTYCD). Over the course of their involvement with the show, they have received mixed reviews. At worst, their choreography has been criticized as "softie hip-hop (more like 'hip-pop')". At best, it has been described as "amazing" and "bring[ing] out the best in their dancers..."

==== Seasons four, five, and six ====
"[Katee and Joshua] did a routine to my song, 'No Air,' and it was crazy to see how they moved to it. It was beautiful and I totally saw the story. I got chills... I played it 100 times."

— Jordin Sparks

Lyrical hip-hop gained exposure and popularity during Tabitha and Napoleon's first season with SYTYCD (season four). On the first performance episode, contestants Katee Shean and Joshua Allen performed a D'umo choreographed lyrical hip-hop piece to the song "No Air" by Jordin Sparks. This routine received positive reviews and was later chosen as a "Judges' Favorite" by judge and executive producer Nigel Lythgoe to be performed again during the finale. BuddyTV.com wrote that the routine deserved an Emmy nomination. Although Tabitha and Napoleon were not nominated for "No Air", they were nominated for "Bleeding Love", another lyrical hip-hop routine performed by Mark Kanemura and Chelsie Hightower which the San Francisco Gate called a "great drama from hip-hop choreographers Tabitha and Napoleon D'Umo, danced with chemistry and theatrical flair." This routine was picked as a "Judges' Favorite" by choreographer and judge Christopher "Lil' C" Toler. In June 2010, TVSquad.com named "No Air" and "Bleeding Love" two of the ten best routines from all seasons of SYTYCD. A third Tabitha and Napoleon lyrical hip-hop routine choreographed to Alicia Keys' song "Like You'll Never See Me Again" did not receive as much critical praise or attention as "Bleeding Love" or "No Air"; however, Nigel Lythgoe confessed when giving feedback on the dance that season four was the first time he had been emotionally affected by hip-hop routines.

Seasons five and six brought less praise for Tabitha and Napoleon. During season five's Top 8 performance episode, Lythgoe commented after a hip-hop routine choreographed by Shane Sparks "It's wonderful to have Shane Sparks back this season. He brings something else... I've been a little disappointed with our hip-hop this year." Out of the ten hip-hop routines (both couples and group routines) choreographed on season five previous to Lythgoe's comment, Tabitha and Napoleon choreographed seven. The most significant criticism came during season six in response to "People are Strange"—a routine about how aliens would attempt to dance hip-hop. None of the judges liked the routine. Lythgoe said the routine placed concept (theme) over substance (dancing). All the judges felt that the dance was weird and that the choreography was more to blame for the dancers' performance than the dancing itself. Of the routine "Give it to me Right" that Tabitha and Napoleon choreographed on a later season six episode about two fraternizing office employees, TVSquad.com wrote that many parts were awkward and that the dance only became enjoyable once the dancers "stopped cavorting around the desk and got out on the floor." In contrast to the mediocre to bad reviews, two other routines they choreographed were picked as "Judges' Favorite" during the season six finale: "Beggin'" (chosen by Lil' C) and "I Can Transform Ya" (chosen by Mary Murphy).

==== Seasons seven and eight ====
Tabitha and Napoleon received their best reviews on SYTYCD during season seven after a performance they choreographed to the song "Outta Your Mind" by Lil Jon. Creators.com called the routine "brilliantly imaginative." Pioneer Local called it "powerful... It's been so long since [Tabitha and Napoleon] have had a showstopping hip-hop number on SYTYCD. Not since Season 4 when they had Katee, Joshua, tWitch, Mark and Chelsie have they pulled out hip-hop this good." The routine was performed by ballet dancer Alex Wong and "All-Star" hip-hop dancer Stephen "tWitch" Boss from season four. The concept is about a psychologist (tWitch) who teaches a dancer (Alex) to let go of his technique and inhibitions and just dance. After the performance, tWitch and Alex received a standing ovation from the crowd and all three judges—Nigel Lythgoe, Mia Michaels, and Adam Shankman. Host Cat Deeley commented "I have never, never, in 'So You Think You Can Dance' history, heard a roar from a crowd like this - ever." Lythgoe called the concept "brilliant... This is about a ballet dancer doing the most incredible hip-hop... If this routine and you are not up for an Emmy with Napoleon and Tabitha next year, I don't know why not. It's probably one of the funnest, best hip-hop routines we've ever had on this show." In slight disagreement, the Wall Street Journal noted that "Outta Your Mind" may in fact be nominated for an Emmy, but it is unlikely to win because past winners have all been lyrical, very emotional routines.

A screenshot from the So You Think You Can Dance season seven finale showing Ellen DeGeneres and hip-hop dancer tWitch performing "Outta Your Mind".

On a later episode, Tabitha and Napoleon choreographed a lyrical hip-hop routine to Alicia Keys debut single "Fallin'". Of the dance, judge Mia Michaels stated "That to me felt more real than any contemporary piece, honestly, because it came from such a raw raw space and place. That was absolutely unbelievable, and it was like watching a dance film." Lythgoe stated that the dance reminded him of "Bleeding Love" and "No Air" from season four and added "Somehow Napoleon and Tabitha have this ability... to put emotion into hip-hop routines and it really is a real talent."

The positive reviews continued through the rest of the season. Of Tabitha and Napoleon's "Scars" routine about angry clowns, Lythgoe called the piece "stunning" and Michaels described it as "hip-hop theater". After the episode aired, Dance Spirit magazine wrote "Tabitha and Napoleon are on FIRE this season!" The Los Angeles Times echoed this comment stating that season seven had been "Nappytabs' best season". On the Top 3 performance episode, after their "Power" routine danced by eventual champion Lauren Froderman and "All-Star" tWitch, Michaels commented "Nappytabs what a season you have had, my God. It's been like home run after home run after home run..." Shankman echoed this comment on the finale by calling Tabitha and Napoleon "the MVPs of the season". Four of their routines—"Fallin'", "Scars", "Battle for the Beat", and "My Chick Bad"—were chosen as "Judges' Favorite" during the season seven finale broadcast. Due to an injury sustained by Alex Wong, "Outta Your Mind" was not picked as a judge's favorite. Instead, it was performed by tWitch and special guest Ellen DeGeneres as a tribute to Alex just before Lauren Froderman was declared the winner of season seven.

Season eight brought back mixed feedback. Early in the season, Tabitha and Napoleon choreographed a lyrical hip-hop routine "Coming Home" about a veteran coming back to his wife after returning from his deployment. The routine generated positive while emotional responses causing both guest judge Debbie Reynolds and resident judge Mary Murphy to cry while giving feedback. The Star Ledger placed "Coming Home" at number three in its list of the top five routines performed during season eight. Tabitha and Napoleon choreographed another lyrical hip-hop routine "I Got You" on the Top 16 performance episode. Celebuzz.com called the routine "dramatic and breathtaking". The dance generated positive reviews from the judges causing them to spontaneously kiss one another in response to a kiss that was choreographed into the dance. On the Top 8 performance episode, Lady Gaga appeared as a guest judge in which three hip-hop routines were performed. Although Tabitha and Napoleon choreographed two of them, she criticized their work while giving feedback on all three. She indirectly criticized them after a lyrical hip-hop piece choreographed by Marty Kudelka in which she referred to the dance style as "dated". Of the two routines they did choreograph, she criticized their use of props in both of them. A flower was used in the first routine "Take a Bow" about a cheating boyfriend asking for forgiveness. Several props including trash cans, rags, and brooms were used in the second routine "Bad Boys for Life" about waste management workers. Aside from disliking the props, she described their hip-hop choreography for "Bad Boys for Life" as "contrived". On the finale, "Coming Home" was not picked as a "Judges Favorite" but two other routines they choreographed, "I Got You" and "Break Ya Neck", were chosen instead by judges Nigel Lythgoe and Lil' C respectively.

=== Make Your Move ===
Make Your Move was released in South Korea and the United States in April 2013. With the exception of a make-out scene the choreography was generally praised among critics. The Washington Post stated "Although the bit of bedroom footwork was more laugh-inducing than anything, some of the dancing really is spectacular. Scenes from the competing clubs include impressive choreography and gravity-defying moves." KPopStarz.com wrote "The dance teams and performances are enough to dominate the scenes, and definitely deserve a look. They bring forth the unique charm of watching a dance movie." RogerEbert.com stated "'Make Your Move' rests on the success of its various dance sequences, not its plot. And the dancing here is exciting, innovative, and specific. Each 'number' has a story behind it, a motivation, a different look and feel... I could have lived without the choreographed (literally) foreplay scene, as they dance their way to the bed, but there are other dance sequences between the two where their chemistry vibrates off the screen." The Hollywood Reporter said "The Romeo and Juliet-inspired plotline basically serves as a framing device allowing the opportunity for a plethora of exuberant dance sequences that particularly show off Hough's considerable talent."

== Awards and recognition ==
Primetime Emmy Awards
Tabitha and Napoleon have won two Emmys from a total of four nominations. At the 2013 Primetime Emmy Awards ceremony, they joined the other choreography nominees and created a routine honoring dance that was performed just before the Outstanding Choreography award was presented. 2013 was the first year the Outstanding Choreography award was presented at the Primetime Emmys telecast rather than at the Creative Arts Emmys ceremony which takes place a week prior.

Year	Award	Result
2014	Outstanding Choreography	Won
2013	Outstanding Choreography	Nominated
2011	Outstanding Choreography	Won
2009	Outstanding Choreography	Nominated

MTV Video Music Awards

Year	Award	Result
2015	Best Choreography	Nominated

Dancers' Choice Awards

Year	Award	Result
2016	America's Favorite Choreographer	Won
2014	Favorite Choreographer	Nominated
2014	Favorite Concert Choreographer	Won
2013	Most Popular Choreographer for TV, Film, and YouTube	Won

The Carnival Choreographer's Ball

Year	Award	Result
2016	Lifetime Achievement Award	Won
2014	Industry Innovators Award	Won

World of Dance

Year	Award	Result
2017	Best Live Show of the Year	Won
2017	Best Live Performance on Television	Nominated
2012	Decade of Dance	Won

Entertainment Weekly
In 2011, Entertainment Weekly compiled a list of the "25 Best Performances Ever" on So You Think You Can Dance. Tabitha and Napoleon choreographed four routines on the list.

Year	Work	Rank
2011	"Outta Your Mind"	#1
2011	"No Air"	#2
2011	"Bleeding Love"	#11
2011	"My Chick Bad"	#23

Shorty Awards

Year	Award	Result
2019	Best in Dance	Nominated

== Charity work ==
Tabitha and Napoleon have donated money and their time to different non-profit organizations. In 2009, they made an appearance at the Life Changing Lives Gala, the proceeds of which benefited the Wounded Warrior Project, the Make-A-Wish Foundation, and the Boys & Girls Clubs. At the event, dancers Katie Shean and Joshua Allen from season four of So You Think You Can Dance performed the D'umo choreographed "No Air" lyrical hip-hop routine about a soldier telling his girlfriend he is being deployed.

In the wake of the 2010 Haiti earthquake, Tabitha and Napoleon held a week-long fundraiser from online sales of their dancewear line. The money raised was donated to Artists for Peace and Justice who in turn gave 100% of their donations toward humanitarian relief efforts. For a separate fundraiser, they donated Nappytabs merchandise for a silent auction held by the organization Art4Life to benefit the American Cancer Society.

In 2012, they taught classes at "The JabbaWockeez Experience" held at the Alexis Park Resort in Las Vegas. The event raised money for the Monsters on the Move Foundation which grants scholarships to aspiring dancers.

In 2013, they worked with the Jabbawockeez again on a music video to the song "Celebrate" by Empire of the Sun and Tommy Trash. The music video also featured Les Twins, 8 Flavahz, and Harry Shum, Jr. and was used to raise money for a Coke (RED) campaign to decrease the number of HIV-infected newborns and raise awareness about AIDS. For Veterans Day 2013, they choreographed a military themed performance for the Homeward Bound Telethon that aired live on the Military Channel. The purpose of the telethon was to raise money for veterans with TBI and PTSD.

Tabitha and Napoleon are on the board of directors of the Dizzy Feet Foundation and the advisory board of The Young Choreographers Festival.

== See also ==
- List of dance personalities
- List of dancers
