= Champion Ballroom Academy =

Dance studio in San Diego, California, US

- Type: Private
- Industry: Cultural, Entertainment
- Founded: San Diego, California, United States (1990)
- Headquarters: San Diego, California, United States
- Key people: Mary Murphy, Founder
- Services: Ballroom Dance Instruction; Shows & Exhibitions
- Website: http://championballroom.com

The Champion Ballroom Academy (founded April 1990) is a dance studio in San Diego, California. Its main specialties are social partner-dancing, competitive ballroom dance (aka. Dancesport) and the Latin-dance-based aerobic program Core Rhythms.

The studio also hosts weekly social dances open to the public, and other monthly events hosted by local dance and social organizations.

Since founder Mary Murphy's casting as a judge of the Fox TV series So You Think You Can Dance, the studio has expanded its repertoire to include guest instructors of other dance styles, including hip hop, flamenco, and contemporary dance.

The studio also hosts at least two showcase parties per year, which include judged dance contests, professional exhibitions, and special guest performances of ballroom and other dance styles.

Special guests and showcase highlights have included:

- Benji Schwimmer - winner of So You Think You Can Dance
- Anna Trebunskaya, Louis van Amstel - professionals on Dancing with the Stars
- Dmitry Chaplin, Artem Chigvintsev, Ryan Conferido, Ashlé Dawson - finalists of SYTYCD
- Ron Montez, Tony Meredith, Melanie LaPatin, Rick Valenzuela - Latin dance champions
- Michael Mead, Toni Redpath, Hunter & Maria Johnson - Smooth ballroom champions
- Jaana Kunitz, Julia Gorchakova - dance champions and creators of Core Rhythms^{©}

== See also ==
- Mary Murphy (choreographer)
