= Mary Murphy (choreographer) =

American ballroom dance champion, choreographer, and judge (born c. 1958)

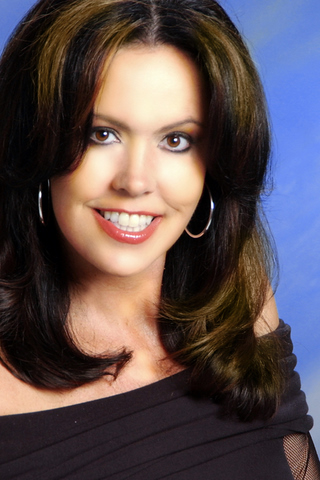
- Mary Murphy in 2006
- Born: Mary Ann Murphy; March 9, 1958 (age 68); Lancaster, Ohio, U.S.
- Education: Ohio University
- Occupation: Choreographer
- Known for: Judge on So You Think You Can Dance (2005–09, 2011–2014, 2017–2019)
- Height: 5 ft 11 in (1.80 m)

Mary Ann Murphy (born c. 1958) is an American ballroom dance champion, accredited dance judge, and a judge and choreographer on the Fox dance competition-reality show So You Think You Can Dance.

== Early life and education ==
Mary Murphy was born in Lancaster, Ohio in an Irish family. She graduated from Northwest High School in Canal Fulton, Ohio. After graduating from Ohio University with a degree in physical education and a minor in modern dance, Murphy moved to Washington, D.C. to begin her career.

== Career ==
She answered a newspaper advertisement for studio instructor trainees. She became an instructor after only one week, and the studio owner invited her to attend the United States Ballroom Championships in New York City, which was the event that influenced her to commit to a career in ballroom dancing.

Murphy moved to California and searched for a dance partner while working as an instructor. During the U.K. Open Championships in England, she met Manfred Stiglitz and a dancing partnership was formed. The two began to compete and eventually became the 1990 and 1991 Austrian National Champions. Despite their success, the constant travel and Murphy's domestic commitments took their toll. Murphy had opened the Champion Ballroom Academy in San Diego in 1990 and found it difficult splitting herself between these two obligations.

For the next five years she went on to build a list of accomplishments with partners based in California, earning titles at the Southwest Regional Dance Tournament, the Saint Louis Star Ball, and the International Grand Ball. With partner Bill Milner, Murphy made the U.S. Open Standard final in an unprecedented six months. Finally, in 1996, she and partner Jim Desmond made the final of the U.S. Open American Smooth and won the U.S. Open American Nine Dance. She retired from competition and shifted her focus toward her dance academy.

She acted as a dance double for Julia Roberts in the movie Something to Talk About and appeared in Dance With Me, starring Vanessa L. Williams.

She appeared in the 2010 movie Degrassi Takes Manhattan as a worker at a casino wedding chapel.

She currently runs her dance studio and organizes a Los Angeles dance competition, the Hollywood Dancesport Championships. She frequently serves as a judge in several competitions, including the U.S. National Ballroom Championships.

=== So You Think You Can Dance ===
Murphy was part of the original guest judge and choreographer pool when season 1 began in 2005. In 2006, for season 2, she made increasing appearances at the judging table. In 2007, prior to season 3, Murphy was announced as a permanent judge, a position previously held only by Nigel Lythgoe.

In 2008, Murphy made guest appearances on international versions of So You Think You Can Dance, including So You Think You Can Dance Australia, So You Think You Can Dance Canada and So You Think You Can Dance Scandinavia.

In 2008, Murphy reprised her role as judge on season 4 with fellow regular, Nigel Lythgoe, and on the season finale, performed a surprise samba with Dmitry Chaplin. Murphy continued as a weekly permanent judge on season 5 and season 6.

For season 7, it was announced that Mia Michaels would replace Murphy as permanent judge. Although absent most of the season, Murphy appeared with a seat at the judging table for Vegas Week as well as the final episode. In 2011, she returned to replace Mia Michaels as a permanent judge for season 8.

==== Choreography ====
Season	Dancers	Style	Music
1	Ashlé Dawson; Jamile McGee	Jive	Jim Dandy – LaVern Baker
1	Melody Lacayanga; Craig DeRosa	Jive	Jim Dandy – LaVern Baker
1	Kamilah Barrett; Nick Lazzarini	Tango	Tanguedia – Prandi Sound Dance Orchestra
1	Ashlé Dawson; Blake McGrath	Samba	Jazz Machine – Black Machine
1	Melody Lacayanga; Nick Lazzarini	Paso Doble	España cañí – Boston Pops Orchestra
2	Jessica Fernandez; Jaymz Tuaileva	Foxtrot	Why Don't You Do Right? – Sinéad O'Connor
2	Ashlee Nino; Ben Susak	Jive	Great Balls of Fire – Jerry Lee Lewis
2	Top 14	Jive	Footloose – Kenny Loggins (Soundtrack: Footloose)
2	Heidi Groskreutz; Travis Wall	Paso Doble	Plaza of Execution – James Horner (Soundtrack: Zorro - The Mask of Zorro)
2	Donyelle Jones; Dmitry Chaplin	Samba	Hey Mama – The Black Eyed Peas
2	Natalie Fotopoulos; Dmitry Chaplin	Samba	Magaleñha – Sérgio Mendes
4	Mary Murphy; Dmitry Chaplin	Samba	Baila, Baila – Angela Via

=== Burn the Floor ===
From December 22, 2009, to January 10, 2010, Murphy headlined the Broadway ballroom dance show Burn the Floor. She was partnered with Vaidas Skimelis.

Murphy returned to the touring cast of Burn the Floor in September and October 2010, with performances in San Jose and San Diego, once again partnered with Vaidas Skimelis.

== Personal life ==
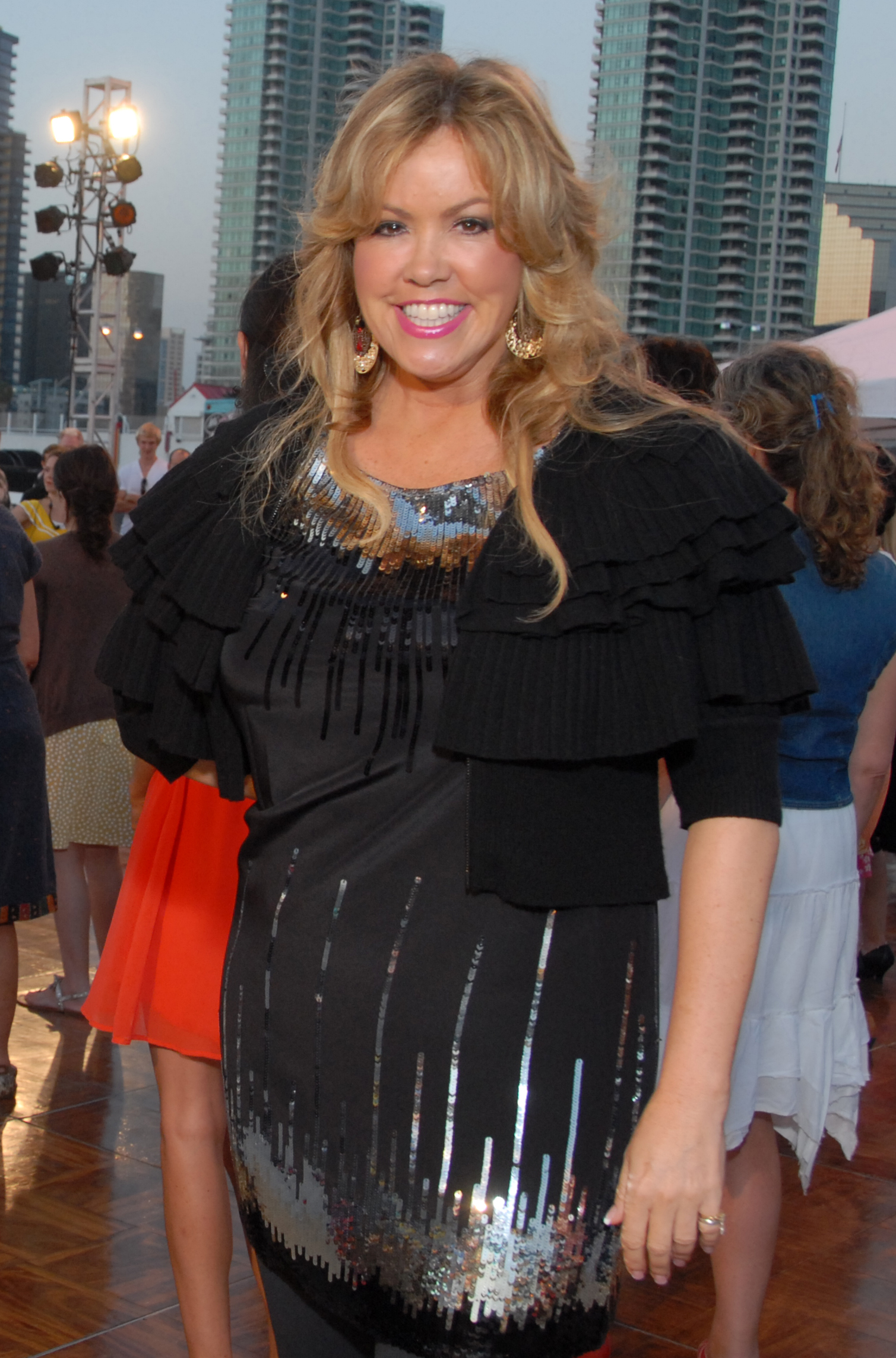
Murphy in San Diego in August 2012

Murphy has been married three times and revealed that during her first marriage, which lasted nine years, she was a victim of domestic abuse. In October 2010, on Larry King Live, she said she was finally speaking out so that other victims could learn how she endured, but escaped, domestic violence. Her first husband denies physically or mentally abusing her.

In 2008, Murphy divorced amicably with her third husband, Phillip Gott, who remains an employee of her ballroom dance academy. On May 28, 2011, Murphy announced that she made amends with her second husband in his final days battling cancer. On July 22, 2011, Murphy stated in her online blog "As we said goodbye to the contestants, I'm also saying goodbye to my ex husband today, as cancer has taken another special person from my life. Even though our marriage did not work out, we became good friends. I will miss him and I will always love him."

In 2011, during the announcements of Murphy's return as a permanent judge for season 8 of So You Think You Can Dance, it was revealed that she had undergone treatment for thyroid cancer. Although there was a possibility that she would never be able to speak again, she is now cancer-free with vocal cords intact.

== Awards ==
- Nominee, Favorite Host/Judge, The 2009 Fox Reality Awards
- Winner, Favorite Host/Judge, The 2007 Reality Really Awards
- Lifetime Achievement Award, 2007 Heritage Dance Classic
- Nominee, Favorite Judge, The 2006 Reality Really Awards
- U.S. National Professional 9-Dance Champion, 1996 United States Ballroom Dance Championships
- Austrian National 10-dance and Ballroom Champion, Representatives at the World Championships

== See also ==
- List of dancers
