= So You Think You Can Dance (American TV series) season 8 =

So You Think You Can Dance
- Season 8
- Hosted by: Cat Deeley
- Judges: Nigel Lythgoe; Mary Murphy
- Winner: Melanie Moore
- Runner-up: Sasha Mallory

Release
- Original network: Fox
- Original release: May 26 – August 11, 2011

Season chronology
- ← Previous; Season 7 Next → Season 9

So You Think You Can Dance is an American television reality program and dance competition airing on the Fox network. The show's eighth season premiered on May 26, 2011. It features the return of Mary Murphy and Nigel Lythgoe as permanent judges and Cat Deeley as host. Also returning is the selection of a Top 20 for the studio shows, in contrast to season 7's Top 11. This is the final season to feature Results Show episodes. Contemporary contestant Melanie Moore won the season and Sasha Mallory was the runner-up. This is the first season where both the winner and runner-up were female. Moore and fellow grand finalist Mark Germor, who were paired as a couple from the first performance episode, became the fourteenth contestants in the show's run never to face elimination from being among the bottom six or bottom four contestants, became the eleventh contestants to be in the grand finale, and became the fourth pair in the show's run never to face elimination from being among the bottom six or bottom four contestants in the grand finale.

== Judging panel ==
Mary Murphy returned and replaced Mia Michaels as a permanent judge after being absent in season 7 due to contract disputes and to undergo surgery to remove a thyroid tumor. Adam Shankman's permanent judge spot—to which he was unable to return due to conflict with directing the film Rock of Ages—was filled with rotating guest judges Robin Antin, Lil' C, Tyce Diorio, Toni Redpath, and Jason Gilkison.

== Auditions ==
Open auditions for this season took place in the following five cities:

| Air Date | Location | Audition Date | Judges |
|---|---|---|---|
| May 26, 2011 | Paramount Theatre - Oakland, California (billed as San Francisco) | October 13, 2010 | Nigel Lythgoe, Tyce Diorio, Toni Redpath |
| May 26, 2011 | Fox Theatre - Atlanta, Georgia | February 19, 2011 | Nigel Lythgoe, Mary Murphy, Lil' C |
| June 1, 2011 | Brooklyn, New York | November 15, 2010 | Nigel Lythgoe, Mary Murphy, Jason Gilkison |
| June 1, 2011 | Capitol Theater - Salt Lake City, Utah | February 2, 2011 | Nigel Lythgoe, Mary Murphy, Robin Antin |
| June 2, 2011 | Orpheum Theatre - Los Angeles, California | March 12, 2011 | Nigel Lythgoe, Mary Murphy, Tyce Diorio |

=== Las Vegas week ===
Judges: Nigel Lythgoe, Mary Murphy, Debbie Allen, Tyce Diorio, Robin Antin, and Adam Shankman, who was replaced by Jason Gilkison on Day 2 due to a conflict with his schedule. The Las Vegas callbacks, which started on April 8, 2011, were held at Planet Hollywood Resort and Casino in Las Vegas, Nevada. Thirty-one dancers made it through to the final stage before the selection of the Top 20.

| Task/style | Music | Choreographer(s) |
|---|---|---|
| Individual solo | Music chosen by contestant | The contestant |
| Hip-Hop | "Look at Me Now"—Chris Brown feat. Lil Wayne & Busta Rhymes | Napoleon and Tabitha D'umo |
| Broadway | "I Gotcha" from Fosse | Tyce Diorio |
| Jive | "Blue Suede Shoes (from Viva Elvis)"—Elvis Presley | Jason Gilkison |
| Group routines | Picked out of a hat | The contestant |
| Contemporary | "Yellow"—Vitamin String Quartet | Travis Wall |
| Individual solo | Music chosen by contestant | The contestant |

== Studio Shows ==
=== Format changes ===
This season featured a combination of the Top 20 format from seasons 2–6 and the All-Star format from season 7. The studio shows began with a Top 20. When the show reached Top 10 week, contestants from previous seasons (the All-Stars) partnered current contestants in individual dance genres. Lythgoe has noted that although fans of the show complained about season 7's format and missed "the interconnection between people who had never been in competition before," "putting [contestants] with an All-Star lifted their game immensely," which informed his decision to combine the two formats and try to "have the best of both worlds." This season also marked the first time that the public was able to cast their votes by SMS or online, in addition to calling in, with a limit of 50 votes per viewer.

=== Top 20 Contestants ===
==== Female contestants ====
| Contestants | Age | Home Town | Dance Style | Elimination date | Placement |
|---|---|---|---|---|---|
| Melanie Moore | 19 | Marietta, Georgia | Contemporary | August 11, 2011 | Winner |
| Sasha Mallory | 23 | Bakersfield, California | African Jazz | August 11, 2011 | Runner Up |
| Caitlynn Lawson | 18 | Moses Lake, Washington | Contemporary | August 4, 2011 | Top 6 |
| Jordan Casanova | 19* | Chino Hills, California | Jazz | July 28, 2011 | Top 8 |
| Clarice Ordaz | 19 | Whittier, California | Jazz | July 21, 2011 | Top 10 |
| Ryan Ramirez | 19 | Morgan Hill, California | Contemporary | July 14, 2011 | Top 12 |
| Ashlee “Ashley” Rich | 22 | Antioch, California | Contemporary | July 7, 2011 | Top 14 |
| Miranda Maleski | 19 | Pittsburgh, Pennsylvania | Contemporary | June 30, 2011 | Top 16 |
| Iveta Lukošiūtė | 30 | Woodside, New York (originally from Lithuania) | Ballroom | June 23, 2011 | Top 20 |
| Missy Morelli | 20 | Arvada, Colorado | Jazz | June 23, 2011 | Top 20 |

- Jordan turned 19 on June 15, 2011.

==== Male contestants ====
| Contestants | Age | Home Town | Dance Style | Elimination date | Placement |
|---|---|---|---|---|---|
| Marko Germar | 22 | Canoga Park, California | Lyrical Jazz | August 11, 2011 | 3rd Place |
| Tadd Gadduang | 25 | Provo, Utah | Breakdance | August 11, 2011 | 4th Place |
| Ricky Jaime | 19 | Miami, Florida | Contemporary | August 4, 2011 | Top 6 |
| Jess LeProtto | 18 | Newark, New Jersey | Broadway | July 28, 2011 | Top 8 |
| Mitchell Kelly | 20 | Atlanta, Georgia | Contemporary | July 21, 2011 | Top 10 |
| Alexander Fost | 21 | Los Alamitos, California | Ballet | July 14, 2011 | Top 12 |
| Chris Koehl | 21 | Garland, Texas | Hip Hop | July 7, 2011 | Top 14 |
| Robert Taylor Jr. | 31* | Brooklyn, New York | Hip Hop | June 30, 2011 | Top 16 |
| Wadi Jones | 24 | Oceanside, New York | Breakdance | June 23, 2011 | Top 20 |
| Nick Young | 19 | Milwaukee, Wisconsin | Tap | June 23, 2011 | Top 20 |

- Robert was 30 at the time of application. His age on the website is 31 years old.

==== Elimination chart ====
Contestants are listed alphabetically by first name, then in reverse chronological order of elimination.

Legend
| Female | Male | Bottom 3 couples | Bottom 4 contestants | Injury |

| Week: | 6/16^{1} | 6/23 | 6/30 | 7/7 | 7/14 | 7/21 | 7/28 | 8/4 | 8/11 |
| Contestant | Result | | | | | | | | |
| Melanie Moore | | | | | | | | | **Winner** |
| Sasha Mallory | | | | | Btm 3 | | | | **Runner-Up** |
| Marko Germar | | | | | | | | | **3rd Place** |
| Tadd Gadduang | Btm 3 | | | Btm 3 | | | Btm 4 | | **4th Place** |
| Ricky Jaime | | Btm 3 | | Btm 3 | Btm 3 | Btm 4 | | **Elim** | |
| Caitlynn Lawson | | | Btm 3 | | Btm 3 | | Btm 4 | **Elim** | |
| Jess LeProtto | Btm 3 | | | | | | **Elim** | | |
| Jordan Casanova | Btm 3 | | | Btm 3 | | Btm 4 | **Elim** | | |
| Mitchell Kelly | Injury^{2} | | Btm 3 | | Btm 3 | **Elim** | | | |
| Clarice Ordaz | Btm 3 | | | | | **Elim** | | | |
| Alexander Fost | | | | | **Elim** | | | | |
| Ryan Ramirez | | Btm 3 | | Btm 3 | **Elim** | | | | |
| Chris Koehl | | | Btm 3 | **Elim** | | | | | |
| Ashley Rich | | | Btm 3 | **Elim** | | | | | |
| Robert Taylor Jr. | Btm 3 | | **Elim** | | | | | | |
| Miranda Maleski | Btm 3 | | **Elim** | | | | | | |
| Nick Young | | **Elim** | | | | | | | |
| Iveta Lukosiute | | **Elim** | | | | | | | |
| Wadi Jones | | **Elim** | | | | | | | |
| Missy Morelli | | **Elim** | | | | | | | |

^1 The judges elected not to eliminate anyone the first week. As a result, two couples were eliminated the following week.
^2 Due to Mitchell Kelly having an elbow injury, he was barred from performing the routine. See below for more information.

=== Performance shows ===
==== Meet the Top 20 (June 9, 2011) ====
- Judges: Nigel Lythgoe, Mary Murphy, Tyce Diorio, Lil' C, Robin Antin
- Performances:

| Contestants | Style | Music | Choreographer(s) |
|---|---|---|---|
| Ricky Jaime; Miranda Maleski; Sasha Mallory; Melanie Moore | Contemporary | "In This Shirt"—The Irrepressibles | Stacey Tookey |
| Tadd Gadduang; Wadi Jones; Chris Koehl; Robert Taylor Jr. | Hip-hop | "Everyday (Coolin')"—Swizz Beatz feat. Eve | Dave Scott |
| Iveta Lukosiute; Pasha Kovalev | Ballroom Medley (Viennese Waltz, Paso Doble, and Cha-cha-cha) | "Ven a Bailar (On the Floor)"—Jennifer Lopez feat. Pitbull | Jason Gilkison |
| Jordan Casanova; Marko Germar; Missy Morelli; Clarice Ordaz | Jazz | "Vanguardian"—Steed Lord | Sonya Tayeh |
| Jess LeProtto; Nick Young | Broadway/Tap | "Funkier Than a Mosquito's Tweeter"—Nina Simone | Christopher Scott |
| Alexander Fost; Mitchell Kelly; Caitlynn Lawson; Ryan Ramirez; Ashley Rich | Contemporary | "Moth's Wings"—Passion Pit | Travis Wall |
| Top 10 male contestants | Hip-hop/Contemporary | "Velocity"—Nathan Lanier | Christopher Scott |
| Top 10 female contestants | Jazz | "Pop Drop & Roll"—Chonique Sneed & Lisette Bustamante | Sonya Tayeh |
| Top 20 | Jazz | "Little Bird"—Annie Lennox | Tyce Diorio |

==== Top 20 Perform (June 15, 2011) ====
- Judges: Nigel Lythgoe, Mary Murphy, Megan Mullally
- Performances:

| Couple | Style | Music | Choreographer(s) | Result(s) |
|---|---|---|---|---|
| Jordan Casanova; Tadd Gadduang | African Jazz | "Riding the Waves"—Afro Celt Sound System | Sean Cheesman | Bottom 3 |
| Sasha Mallory; Alexander Fost | Contemporary | "Stupid" (Mark Bell mix)—Sarah McLachlan | Travis Wall | Safe |
| Clarice Ordaz; Jess LeProtto | Broadway | "Me and My Baby"—Liza Minnelli | Tyce Diorio | Bottom 3 |
| Ryan Ramirez; Ricky Jaime | Lyrical hip-hop | "Ain't No Sunshine"—Lighthouse Family | Christopher Scott | Safe |
| Caitlynn Lawson; Robert Roldan^{2} | Jazz | "In For the Kill" (Skream's Let's Get Ravey Remix)—La Roux | Sonya Tayeh | Safe |
| Miranda Maleski; Robert Taylor Jr. | Jive | "Runaway Baby"—Bruno Mars | Jason Gilkison | Bottom 3 |
| Missy Morelli; Wadi Jones | Pop Jazz | "Judas" (R3HAB Remix)—Lady Gaga | Sean Cheesman | Safe |
| Melanie Moore; Marko Germar | Contemporary | "Turn to Stone"—Ingrid Michaelson | Travis Wall | Safe |
| Ashley Rich; Chris Koehl | Hip-Hop | "Forget You"—Cee Lo Green | Christopher Scott | Safe |
| Iveta Lukosiute; Nick Young | Quickstep | "The Ballroom Blitz"—Sweet | Jason Gilkison | Safe |

^2 Due to a shoulder injury, Mitchell Kelly was barred from performing in his routine. He was replaced for the evening by season 7's Robert Roldan and was automatically in danger of going home.

==== Top 20 Perform Again (June 22, 2011) ====
- Judges: Nigel Lythgoe, Mary Murphy, Debbie Reynolds
- Performances:

| Couple | Style | Music | Choreographer(s) | Result(s) |
|---|---|---|---|---|
| Ryan Ramirez; Ricky Jaime | Jazz | "Addicted to Love"—Robert Palmer | Mandy Moore | Bottom 3 |
| Caitlynn Lawson; Mitchell Kelly | Contemporary | "Turning Tables"—Adele | Stacey Tookey | Safe |
| Missy Morelli; Wadi Jones | Cha-cha-cha | "Cannibal"—Kesha | Jean-Marc Généreux | Both eliminated |
| Iveta Lukosiute; Nick Young | Bollywood | "Baawre" from Luck by Chance | Nakul Dev Mahajan | Both eliminated |
| Miranda Maleski; Robert Taylor Jr. | Hip-hop | "Break Ya Neck"—Busta Rhymes | Nappytabs | Safe |
| Clarice Ordaz; Jess LeProtto | Contemporary | "Cathedrals"—Jump, Little Children | Stacey Tookey | Safe |
| Jordan Casanova; Tadd Gadduang | Viennese Waltz | "Fade Into Me"—David Cook | Jean-Marc Généreux | Safe |
| Melanie Moore; Marko Germar | Jazz | "Sing, Sing, Sing (With a Swing)" (Raf Marchesini Remix)—DKS | Mandy Moore | Safe |
| Sasha Mallory; Alexander Fost | Hip-hop | "Coming Home"—Diddy-Dirty Money feat. Skylar Grey | Nappytabs | Safe |
| Ashley Rich; Chris Koehl | Broadway | "Please, Mr. Jailer"—Rachel Sweet | Spencer Liff | Safe |

==== Top 16 Perform (June 29, 2011) ====
- Judges: Nigel Lythgoe, Mary Murphy, Kristin Chenoweth, Lil' C
- Performances:

| Couple | Style | Music | Choreographer(s) | Result(s) |
|---|---|---|---|---|
| Sasha Mallory; Chris Koehl; Ryan Ramirez; Tadd Gadduang; Clarice Ordaz; Marko Germar; Miranda Maleski; Mitchell Kelly | Broadway | "Hit the Road Jack"—Ray Charles | Tyce Diorio | No Results |
| Sasha Mallory; Alexander Fost | Contemporary | "Belong"—Cary Brothers | Dee Caspary | Safe |
| Caitlynn Lawson; Mitchell Kelly | Samba | "Put It in a Love Song"—Alicia Keys feat. Beyoncé Knowles | Jean-Marc Généreux | Bottom 3 |
| Miranda Maleski; Robert Taylor Jr. | Broadway | "It Don't Mean a Thing (If It Ain't Got That Swing)" from Sophisticated Ladies | Tyce Diorio | Both eliminated |
| Melanie Moore; Marko Germar | Lyrical hip-hop | "I Got You"—Leona Lewis | Nappytabs | Safe |
| Ashley Rich; Chris Koehl | Jazz | "Lights Go Down" (District 78 remix)—Telepathe | Sonya Tayeh | Bottom 3 |
| Clarice Ordaz; Jess LeProtto | Foxtrot | "Fly Me to the Moon"—Frank Sinatra | Jean-Marc Généreux | Safe |
| Ryan Ramirez; Ricky Jaime | Contemporary | "With Every Heartbeat" (Acoustic)—Robyn | Sonya Tayeh | Safe |
| Jordan Casanova; Tadd Gadduang | Hip-hop | "Memories"—David Guetta feat. Kid Cudi | Nappytabs | Safe |
| Jordan Casanova; Robert Taylor Jr. Melanie Moore; Jess LeProtto; Ashley Rich; Alexander Fost; Caitlynn Lawson; Ricky Jaime | Contemporary | "Poison & Wine"—The Civil Wars | Dee Caspary | No Results |

==== Top 14 Perform (July 6, 2011) ====
- Judges: Nigel Lythgoe, Mary Murphy, Carmen Electra, Travis Wall
- Performances:

| Couple | Style | Music | Choreographer(s) | Result(s) |
|---|---|---|---|---|
| Top 7 male contestants | Contemporary | "Prague"—Damien Rice | Justin Giles | No results |
| Melanie Moore; Marko Germar | Latin Jazz | "Americano"—Lady Gaga | Ray Leeper | Safe |
| Sasha Mallory; Alexander Fost | Hip-hop | "To the Moon"—Miguel | Shaun Evaristo | Safe |
| Jordan Casanova; Tadd Gadduang | Smooth Waltz | "Nocturne"—Secret Garden | Toni Redpath | Bottom 3 |
| Clarice Ordaz; Jess LeProtto | Contemporary | "Light Through the Branches"—Celeste Lear | Justin Giles | Safe |
| Ashley Rich; Chris Koehl | Salsa | "Mambo Beat"—Tito Puente | Liz Lira | Both eliminated |
| Ryan Ramirez; Ricky Jaime | Pop Jazz | "Fashion"—David Bowie | Charles Klapow | Bottom 3 |
| Caitlynn Lawson; Mitchell Kelly | Contemporary | "To Love You More"—Celine Dion | Mandy Moore | Safe |
| Top 7 female contestants | Jazz | "My Discarded Men"—Eartha Kitt feat. Bronski Beat | Ray Leeper | No results |

==== Top 12 Perform (July 13, 2011) ====
- Judges: Nigel Lythgoe, Mary Murphy, Jesse Tyler Ferguson, Sonya Tayeh
- Performances:

| Couple | Style | Music | Choreographer(s) | Result(s) |
|---|---|---|---|---|
| Sasha Mallory; Alexander Fost | Paso Doble | "Alley Dash/March of the Trolls"—Taylor Long/Rick Powell | Tony Meredith; Melanie LaPatin | Fost eliminated |
| Sasha Mallory; Alexander Fost | Jazz | "That's Life"—Aretha Franklin | Tyce Diorio | Fost eliminated |
| Jordan Casanova; Tadd Gadduang | Contemporary | "Brotsjór"—Ólafur Arnalds | Travis Wall | Safe |
| Jordan Casanova; Tadd Gadduang | Broadway | "Out Tonight" from Rent (Original Broadway Cast) | Spencer Liff | Safe |
| Ryan Ramirez; Ricky Jaime | Broadway | "All I Need is the Girl"—Frank Sinatra | Spencer Liff | Ramirez eliminated |
| Ryan Ramirez; Ricky Jaime | Cha-cha-cha | "Tonight (I'm Lovin' You)"—Enrique Iglesias featuring DJ Frank E | Louis van Amstel | Ramirez eliminated |
| Caitlynn Lawson; Mitchell Kelly | Hip-hop | "Break the Chain"—Lupe Fiasco feat. Eric Turner and Sway | Christopher Scott | Bottom 3 |
| Caitlynn Lawson; Mitchell Kelly | Jazz | "Piece of My Heart"—Janis Joplin | Travis Wall | Bottom 3 |
| Melanie Moore; Marko Germar | Tango | "Triptico"—Gotan Project | Louis van Amstel | Safe |
| Melanie Moore; Marko Germar | Contemporary | "Skin and Bones"—David J. Roch | Dee Caspary | Safe |
| Clarice Ordaz; Jess LeProtto | Lyrical hip-hop | "Just The Way You Are"—Boyce Avenue | Christopher Scott | Safe |
| Clarice Ordaz; Jess LeProtto | Jive | "Ain't Nothing Wrong With That"—Robert Randolph and the Family Band | Tony Meredith; Melanie LaPatin | Safe |

==== Top 10 Perform (July 20, 2011) ====
- Judges: Nigel Lythgoe, Mary Murphy, Neil Patrick Harris
- Performances:

| Contestants | Style | Music | Choreographer(s) | Result(s) |
|---|---|---|---|---|
| **Marko Germar**; Chelsie Hightower | Samba | "Cinema Italiano" (The Ron Fair Remix)—Kate Hudson | Jason Gilkison | Safe |
| Brandon Bryant; **Jordan Casanova** | Contemporary | "Who You Are" (Live Acoustic Version)—Jessie J | Dwight Rhoden; Desmond Richardson | Bottom 4 |
| Comfort Fedoke; **Tadd Gadduang** | Hip-hop | "Look at Me Now"—Chris Brown feat. Lil Wayne & Busta Rhymes | Chuck Maldonado | Safe |
| **Mitchell Kelly**; Melody Lacayanga | Broadway | "Take Off With Us" from All That Jazz | Tyce Diorio | Eliminated |
| Pasha Kovalev; **Caitlynn Lawson** | Argentine Tango | "Malajunta"—Orquesta Color Tango | Miriam Larici; Leonardo Barrionuevo | Safe |
| Stephen "tWitch" Boss; **Sasha Mallory** | Hip-hop | "Misty Blue"—Dorothy Moore | Christopher Scott | Safe |
| **Jess LeProtto**; Kathryn McCormick | Contemporary | "The Lonely"—Christina Perri | Stacey Tookey | Safe |
| Pasha Kovalev; **Melanie Moore** | Viennese Waltz | "Everybody Hurts"—Tina Arena | Jason Gilkison | Safe |
| Allison Holker; **Ricky Jaime** | Jazz | "Precious Things"—Tori Amos | Tyce Diorio | Bottom 4 |
| **Clarice Ordaz**; Robert Roldan | Bollywood | "Aila Re Aila" from Khatta Meetha | Nakul Dev Mahajan | Eliminated |

- Top 10 contestant's solos:

| Contestant | Style | Music | Result |
|---|---|---|---|
| Sasha Mallory | Contemporary | "Syrup & Honey"—Duffy | Safe |
| Jess LeProtto | Broadway | "Come By Me"—Harry Connick Jr. | Safe |
| Melanie Moore | Contemporary | "You're the One That I Want"—Angus & Julia Stone | Safe |
| Ricky Jaime | Contemporary | "Daylight Breaks"—Cassidy Haley | Bottom 4 |
| Clarice Ordaz | Jazz | "Royal T"—Crookers feat. Róisín Murphy | Eliminated |
| Mitchell Kelly | Contemporary | "This Time"—John Legend | Eliminated |
| Jordan Casanova | Contemporary | "Tonight"—Lykke Li | Bottom 4 |
| Tadd Gadduang | B-boying | "Everything I Can't Have"—Robin Thicke | Safe |
| Caitlynn Lawson | Contemporary | "Cosmic Love"—Florence and the Machine | Safe |
| Marko Germar | Jazz | "More Than Anyone" (Stripped version)—Gavin DeGraw | Safe |

==== Top 8 Perform (July 27, 2011) ====
- Judges: Lady Gaga, Nigel Lythgoe, Mary Murphy, Rob Marshall
- Performances:

| Contestants | Style | Music | Choreographer(s) | Result(s) |
|---|---|---|---|---|
| Pasha Kovalev; **Sasha Mallory** | Quickstep | "Puttin' On the Ritz"—Terry Snyder | Jonathan Roberts | Safe |
| Ivan Koumaev; **Caitlynn Lawson** | Hip-hop | "Let Me Love You"—Mario | Marty Kudelka | Bottom 4 |
| Ade Obayomi; **Jordan Casanova** | Jazz | "Nutbush City Limits"—Tina Turner | Tyce Diorio | Eliminated |
| Neil Haskell; **Melanie Moore** | Contemporary | "Total Eclipse of the Heart"—Bonnie Tyler | Mandy Moore | Safe |
| Anya Garnis; **Ricky Jaime** | Jive | "River Deep, Mountain High"—Celine Dion | Jason Gilkison | Safe |
| Lauren Gottlieb; **Jess LeProtto** | Lyrical hip-hop | "Take A Bow"—Rihanna | Nappytabs | Eliminated |
| Lauren Froderman; **Tadd Gadduang** | Jazz | "Another One Bites the Dust"—Queen | Mandy Moore | Bottom 4 |
| Allison Holker; **Marko Germar** | Contemporary | "I Know It's Over"—Jeff Buckley | Sonya Tayeh | Safe |
| Caitlynn Lawson; Tadd Gadduang | Foxtrot | "Top Hat, White Tie and Tails"—Ella Fitzgerald | Jonathan Roberts | Both Bottom 4 |
| Marko Germar; Ricky Jaime | Hip-hop | "Bad Boy For Life"—Diddy feat. Black Rob & Mark Curry | Nappytabs | Both Safe |
| Jordan Casanova; Jess LeProtto | Rumba | "Set Fire to the Rain"—Adele | Jason Gilkison | Both Eliminated |
| Melanie Moore; Sasha Mallory | Jazz | Game On—District 78 | Sonya Tayeh | Both Safe |

==== Top 6 Perform (August 3, 2011) ====
- Judges: Nigel Lythgoe, Mary Murphy, Lil' C, Christina Applegate
- Performances:

| Contestants | Style | Music | Choreographer(s) | Result(s) |
|---|---|---|---|---|
| Stephen "tWitch" Boss; **Melanie Moore** | Hip-hop | "Roman's Revenge"—Nicki Minaj feat. Lil Wayne | Nappytabs | Safe |
| Kent Boyd; **Sasha Mallory** | Contemporary | "Fool of Me"—Meshell Ndegeocello | Tyce Diorio | Safe |
| **Marko Germar**; Janette Manrara | Paso Doble | "Zorongo" (Traditional)—Antonia Gomez, Ely "La Gambita", Guillermo Basilisco & Paco Peña | Dmitry Chaplin | Safe |
| **Tadd Gadduang**; Ellenore Scott | Jazz | "The Gulag Orkestar"—Beirut | Sonya Tayeh | Safe |
| Jaimie Goodwin; **Ricky Jaime** | Contemporary | "Inside These Lines"—Trent Dabbs | Dee Caspary | Eliminated |
| Pasha Kovalev; **Caitlynn Lawson** | Samba | "Drop It Low" (District 78 remix)—Kat DeLuna | Dmitry Chaplin | Eliminated |
| Ricky Jaime; Sasha Mallory | Waacking | "Schoolin' Life"—Beyoncé | Kumari Suraj | Jaime eliminated |
| Tadd Gadduang; Melanie Moore | Broadway | "(Where Do I Begin) Love Story" (Away Team Remix)—Shirley Bassey | Spencer Liff | Safe |
| Marko Germar; Caitlynn Lawson | Lyrical Jazz | "Heavy in Your Arms"—Florence and the Machine | Sonya Tayeh | Lawson eliminated |

- Top 6 contestant's solos:

| Contestant | Style | Music | Result |
|---|---|---|---|
| Ricky Jaime | Contemporary | "After Tonight"—Justin Nozuka | Eliminated |
| Caitlynn Lawson | Contemporary | "What's Love Got to Do with It"— Katie Thompson | Eliminated |
| Tadd Gadduang | B-boying | "We No Speak Americano"—Yolanda Be Cool & DCUP | Safe |
| Sasha Mallory | Jazz | "Teeth"—Lady Gaga | Safe |
| Marko Germar | Contemporary | "Wonderful World (Acoustic)"—James Morrison | Safe |
| Melanie Moore | Jazz | "Cracks" (Flux Pavilion Remix)—Freestylers feat. Belle Humble | Safe |

==== Top 4 Perform (August 10, 2011) ====
- Judges: Nigel Lythgoe, Mary Murphy, Katie Holmes, Kenny Ortega
- Performances:

| Contestants | Style | Music | Choreographer(s) |
|---|---|---|---|
| Melanie Moore; Marko Germar | Disco | "I Feel Love" (12" Version)—Donna Summer | Doriana Sanchez |
| **Sasha Mallory**; Mark Kanemura | Jazz | "Raise Your Weapon"—Deadmau5 | Sonya Tayeh |
| Joshua Allen; **Tadd Gadduang** | Hip-hop | "Hustle Hard"—Ace Hood | Lil' C |
| **Melanie Moore**; Robert Roldan | Contemporary | "Sacrifice"—Sinéad O'Connor | Stacey Tookey |
| Sasha Mallory; Marko Germar | Broadway | "Whatever Lola Wants"—Ella Fitzgerald | Spencer Liff |
| Sasha Mallory; Tadd Gadduang | Cha-cha-cha | "Raindrops"—Basement Jaxx | Mark Ballas |
| Lauren Froderman; **Marko Germar** | Contemporary | "Shirk"—Meshell Ndegeocello | Tessandra Chavez |
| Melanie Moore; Tadd Gadduang | Jazz | "Show Me What You're Working With"—Sista Monica | Ray Leeper |
| Melanie Moore; Sasha Mallory | Contemporary | "Heart Asks Pleasure First"—Ahn Trio | Stacey Tookey |
| Tadd Gadduang; Marko Germar | Stepping | "B.O.B."—OutKast | Chuck Maldonado |

- Top 4 contestant's solos:

| Contestant | Style | Music |
|---|---|---|
| Melanie Moore | Contemporary | "Song for Viola"—Peter Bradley Adams |
| Marko Germar | Contemporary | "The Fear You Won't Fall"—Joshua Radin |
| Tadd Gadduang | B-boying | "Mama Knows Best"—Jessie J |
| Sasha Mallory | Contemporary | "Be Be Your Love"—Rachael Yamagata |

=== Result shows ===
==== Results show musical performances ====
| Week | Performer(s) | Title | Performance type |
|---|---|---|---|
| Week 1 (6/16/2011) | Keri Hilson | "Lose Control" | pre-recorded performance |
| Week 1 (6/16/2011) | Lady Gaga | "The Edge of Glory" | music video world exclusive |
| Week 2 (6/23/2011) | LMFAO, Lauren Bennett, and GoonRock | "Party Rock Anthem" (dancing guests Quest Crew) | pre-recorded performance |
| Week 4 (7/7/2011) | Florence + the Machine | "Cosmic Love" | pre-recorded performance |
| Week 5 (7/14/2011) | Nicole Scherzinger | "Right There" | pre-recorded performance |
| Week 6 (7/21/2011) | Blush and Snoop Dogg | "Undivided" | pre-recorded performance |
| Week 7 (7/28/2011) | Lady Gaga | "You and I"/"The Edge of Glory" | pre-recorded performance |
| Week 8 (8/4/2011) | Pia Toscano | "This Time" | pre-recorded performance |
| Week 9 (8/11/2011) | N/A | N/A | N/A |

==== Week 1 (June 16, 2011) ====
- Group dance: Top 20: "XR2"—M.I.A. (Jazz; Choreographer: Sonya Tayeh)
- Guest dancers: (Hopak)
- Bottom 3's solos:

| Contestant | Style | Music | Result |
|---|---|---|---|
| Mitchell Kelly | Contemporary | "Say"—John Mayer | Safe |
| Jordan Casanova | Jazz | "Hot Like Wow"—Nadia Oh | Safe |
| Tadd Gadduang | Breakdance | "Jump, Jive An' Wail"—The Brian Setzer Orchestra | Safe |
| Clarice Ordaz | Jazz | "Glam"—Christina Aguilera | Safe |
| Jess LeProtto | Broadway | "Mr. Bojangles"—Robbie Williams | Safe |
| Miranda Maleski | Contemporary | "The First Time Ever I Saw Your Face"—Leona Lewis | Safe |
| Robert Taylor Jr. | Hip-Hop | "Electric"—Omarion | Safe |

- Eliminated:
  - No one was eliminated.
- New Pairs:
  - None. Starting with the next four weeks, no one will get a new pair until Top 10.

==== Week 2 (June 23, 2011) ====
- Group dance: "Sinnerman"—Nina Simone (Hip-hop; Choreographer: Dave Scott)
- Guest dancers: Quest Crew
- Bottom 3's solos:

| Contestant | Style | Music | Result |
|---|---|---|---|
| Wadi Jones | B-boying | "Pon de Floor"—Major Lazer feat. Vybz Kartel | Eliminated |
| Missy Morelli | Jazz | "Move" (Metronomy Remix)—CSS | Eliminated |
| Nick Young | Tap | "Follow Me Down"—3OH!3 feat. Neon Hitch | Eliminated |
| Iveta Lukosiute | Samba | "Samba Rock"—Gennaro | Eliminated |
| Ricky Jaime | Contemporary | "Riot Rhythm"—Sleigh Bells | Safe |
| Ryan Ramirez | Contemporary | "Moving Mountains"—Usher | Safe |

- NOTE:
  - Four contestants were eliminated because no one was voted off in Week 1.

==== Week 3 (June 30, 2011) ====
- Group dance: "The Incredits" from The Incredibles (Jazz; Choreographer: Michael Rooney)
- Guest dancers:

- AXIS Dance Company ("Partita for Violin No. 2 in D Minor, BWV 1004: V. Ciaccona"—Janine Jansen; Contemporary; Choreographer: Alex Ketley)
- Eric Luna and Georgia Ambarian ("Calypso" from Pirates of the Caribbean: At World's End; Ballroom)

- Bottom 3's solos:

| Contestant | Style | Music | Result |
|---|---|---|---|
| Ashley Rich | Contemporary | "For You"—David Ryan Harris | Safe |
| Chris Koehl | Hip-hop | "You're Gonna Make It"—KJ-52 feat. Blanca Reyes | Safe |
| Miranda Maleski | Contemporary | "Unthinkable"—Maria Zouroudis | Eliminated |
| Robert Taylor Jr. | Hip-hop | "I Don't Need It"—Jamie Foxx | Eliminated |
| Caitlynn Lawson | Contemporary | "It Doesn't Hurt" (Live version)—Katie Thompson | Safe |
| Mitchell Kelly | Contemporary | "Rolling in the Deep"—Adele | Safe |

==== Week 4 (July 7, 2011) ====
- Group dance: "Kata Kata" from Raavan (Bollywood; Choreographer: Nakul Dev Mahajan)
- Guest dancers: Cedar Lake Contemporary Ballet ("Ends"—Mikael Karlsson)
- Bottom 3's solos:

| Contestant | Style | Music | Result |
|---|---|---|---|
| Ashley Rich | Contemporary | "Lovely"—John West feat. Pusha T | Eliminated |
| Chris Koehl | Hip-hop | "Scars"—Basement Jaxx feat. Kelis, Meleka and Chipmunk | Eliminated |
| Jordan Casanova | Jazz | "Commander"—Kelly Rowland feat. David Guetta | Safe |
| Tadd Gadduang | B-boying | "1-2-3 (Remix)"—Gloria Estefan | Safe |
| Ryan Ramirez | Contemporary | "Adagio for Strings"—Brno Philharmonic Orchestra | Safe |
| Ricky Jaime | Contemporary | "When You Say My Name"—Mario Spinetti | Safe |

==== Week 5 (July 14, 2011) ====
- Group dance: "El Fuego" by Sean Peter feat. Oscar Jimenez (Flamenco-Jazz; Choreographer: Kelley Abbey)
- Guest dancers: Jason Samuels Smith & Anybody Can Get It - "Move The Crowd (Sole Sessions Pt. 1)"
- Bottom 3's solos:

| Contestant | Style | Music | Result |
|---|---|---|---|
| Caitlynn Lawson | Jazz | "The Edge of Glory"—Lady Gaga | Safe |
| Mitchell Kelly | Contemporary | "Ra"—Nathan Lanier | Safe |
| Ryan Ramirez | Jazz | "Not in Love"—Crystal Castles feat. Robert Smith | Eliminated |
| Ricky Jaime | Jazz | "Body Language"—Queen | Safe |
| Sasha Mallory | Modern | "Thinkin' About Your Body"—Bobby McFerrin | Safe |
| Alexander Fost | Ballet | "Palladio"—Escala | Eliminated |

Note: Now it's up to Top 10, they'll be voted individually by America. Also, new pairs randomly picked whether they get a male or female and an All-Star pool.

==== Week 6 (July 21, 2011) ====
- Group dance: "Act One: On Broadway" from Smokey Joe's Cafe (Broadway; Choreographer: Josh Bergasse)
- Guest dancers: Daniil Simkni from The American Ballet Theatre ("Les Bourgeois"—Jacques Brel; Ballet)
- Bottom 4 contestant's solos:

| Contestant | Style | Music | Result |
|---|---|---|---|
| Clarice Ordaz | Jazz | "Let Me Think About It (Radio Edit)"-Ida Corr vs Fedde le Grand | Eliminated |
| Mitchell Kelly | Contemporary | "Time & Space"—The Cinematic Orchestra | Eliminated |
| Jordan Casanova | Contemporary | "Tonight"—Lykke Li | Safe |
| Ricky Jamie | Contemporary | "Battle for the Beat"—District 78 | Safe |

==== Week 7 (July 28, 2011) ====
- Group dance: "The Circus Sets Up" from Water for Elephants (Contemporary; Choreographer: Tyce Diorio)
- Guest dancers: The Legion of Extraordinary Dancers ("Bernini's Angels"—Kerry Muzzey; Choreographers:Christopher Scott and Galen Hooks)
- Bottom 4 contestant's solos:

| Contestant | Style | Music | Result |
|---|---|---|---|
| Jordan Casanova | Jazz-Funk | "S&M"—Rihanna | Eliminated |
| Jess LeProtto | Broadway | "Mack the Knife"—Kevin Spacey | Eliminated |
| Caitlynn Lawson | Contemporary | "What Turns You On"—Katie Thompson | Safe |
| Tadd Gadduang | B-boying | "Jump in the Line"—Harry Belafonte | Safe |

==== Week 8 (August 4, 2011) ====
- Group dance: "Grown Unknown"—Lia Ices (Contemporary; Choreographer: Justin Giles)
- Guest dancers:

- Kent Boyd and Lauren Froderman: "Collide"—Howie Day (Contemporary; Choreographer: Travis Wall)
- Bad Boys of Dance: "Derezzed" from Tron: Legacy (Choreographer: Rasta Thomas)

- Top 6 contestant's solos:

| Contestant | Style | Music | Result |
|---|---|---|---|
| Sasha Mallory | Jazz | "We Gonna Win"—Miri Ben-Ari feat. Styles P. | Safe |
| Caitlynn Lawson | Contemporary | "Touch"—Natasha Bedingfield | Eliminated |
| Melanie Moore | Contemporary | "My Love"—Sia | Safe |
| Tadd Gadduang | B-boying | "Only So Much Oil in the Ground"—Tower of Power | Safe |
| Marko Germar | Contemporary | "You Give Me Something" (Acoustic)—James Morrison | Safe |
| Ricky Jaime | Contemporary | "Requiem for a Tower"—London Music Works & Clint Mansell | Eliminated |

==== Week 9 (Finale) (August 11, 2011) ====
- Judges: Nigel Lythgoe, Mary Murphy, Jesse Tyler Ferguson, Sonya Tayeh, Tyce Diorio, Robin Antin, Lil' C
- Group dances:

| Contestant(s) and guest(s) | Style | Music | Choreographer | Chosen by |
|---|---|---|---|---|
| Top 20 | Jazz | "Wanna Get Hype"—District 78 | Sonya Tayeh | N/A |
| Top 8 | Contemporary | "The Circus Sets Up" from Water for Elephants (taped from broadcast of 28 July) | Tyce Diorio | Cat Deeley |
| Matt Flint^{1} Jess LeProtto; Nick Young | Tap | "Can't Buy Me Love"—Michael Bublé | Matt Flint; Jess LeProtto; Nick Young | N/A |
| Top 10 female contestants | Jazz | "Pop Drop & Roll"—Chonique Sneed & Lisette Bustamante | Sonya Tayeh | Tyce Diorio |
| Top 10 male contestants | Hip-hop | "Velocity"—Nathan Lainer | Christopher Scott | Sonya Tayeh |

^1 Matt Flint is the winner of So You Think You Can Dance UK's second season, and this performance comprised a portion of his prize package.

===== Judges' picks =====
| Dancers | Style | Music | Choreographer | Chosen by |
|---|---|---|---|---|
| **Sasha Mallory**; Kent Boyd | Contemporary | "Fool Of Me"—Meshell Ndegeocello | Tyce Diorio | Mary Murphy |
| **Melanie Moore**; **Marko Germar** | Lyrical hip-hop | "I Got You"—Leona Lewis | Nappytabs | Nigel Lythgoe |
| **Tadd Gadduang**; Lauren Froderman | Jazz | "Another One Bites The Dust"—Queen | Mandy Moore | Robin Antin |
| **Miranda Maleski**; **Robert Taylor Jr**. | Hip-hop | "Break Ya Neck"—Busta Rhymes | Nappytabs | Lil' C |
| **Melanie Moore**; Neil Haskell | Contemporary | "Total Eclipse of the Heart"—Bonnie Tyler | Mandy Moore | Mary Murphy |
| **Marko Germar**; Allison Holker | Contemporary | "I Know It's Over"—Jeff Buckley | Sonya Tayeh | Jesse Tyler Ferguson |
| **Ashley Rich**; **Chris Koehl** | Broadway | "Please, Mister Jailer"—Rachel Sweet | Spencer Liff | Lil' C |
| **Sasha Mallory**; Stephen "tWitch" Boss | Hip-hop | "Misty Blue"—Dorothy Moore | Christopher Scott | Nigel Lythgoe |
| **Caitlynn Lawson**; Pasha Kovalev | Argentine Tango | "Malajunta"—Orquesta Color Tango (taped from broadcast of 20 July) | Miriam Larici; Leonardo Barrionuevo | Jesse Tyler Ferguson |
| **Melanie Moore**; **Marko Germar** | Contemporary | "Turn to Stone"—Ingrid Michaelson | Travis Wall | Mary Murphy |
| **Melanie Moore**; **Sasha Mallory** | Jazz | Game On—District 78 | Sonya Tayeh | Nigel Lythgoe |

=== All-Stars Dance Pool ===
As opposed to last season, there is no set group of All-Star dancers. Rather, All-Stars will be changing weekly based on availability. On the July 14, 2011 results show, Lythgoe announced that Season 7 contestant Alex Wong—forced to withdraw after tearing an Achilles tendon—was asked to be an All-Star for Top 10 week, but that Wong tore his other Achilles tendon at an audition the Saturday prior and thus would not be able to participate.

All-Stars, Contestant Partners, and Results
| Former Contestant | Season | Dance Styles | Original Placement | Contestant | | | | |
| Former Contestant | Season | Dance Styles | Original Placement | Week 6 | | Week 7 | Week 8 | Week 9 |
|---|---|---|---|---|---|---|---|---|
| Melody Lacayanga | 1 | Contemporary/Jazz | Runner-up | Mitchell | | | | |
| Ivan Koumaev | 2 | Hip Hop | Top 6 | | | Caitlynn | | |
| Allison Holker | 2 | Contemporary/Jazz | Top 8 | Ricky | | Marko | | |
| Neil Haskell | 3 | Contemporary/Jazz | 3rd Place | | | Melanie | | |
| Lauren Gottlieb | 3 | Contemporary/Jazz/Hip Hop | Top 6 | | | Jess | | |
| Pasha Kovalev | 3 | Ballroom/Latin | Top 6 | Caitlynn | Melanie | Sasha | Caitlynn | |
| Jaimie Goodwin | 3 | Contemporary/Jazz | Top 10 | | | | Ricky | |
| Anya Garnis | 3 | Ballroom/Latin | Top 12 | | | Ricky | | |
| **Joshua Allen** | 4 | Hip-Hop | **Winner** | | | | | Tadd |
| Stephen "tWitch" Boss | 4 | Popping/Locking/Krump | Runner-up | Sasha | | | Melanie | |
| Chelsie Hightower | 4 | Ballroom/Latin | Top 6 | Marko | | | | |
| Mark Kanemura | 4 | Contemporary/Jazz | Top 6 | | | | | Sasha |
| Comfort Fedoke | 4 | Hip Hop/Krump | Top 8 | Tadd | | | | |
| Brandon Bryant | 5 | Contemporary/Jazz | Runner-up | Jordan | | | | |
| Ade Obayomi | 5 | Contemporary/Jazz | Top 6 | | | Jordan | | |
| Janette Manrara | 5 | Ballroom/Latin | Top 8 | | | | Marko | |
| Kathryn McCormick | 6 | Contemporary/Jazz | 3rd Place | Jess | | | | |
| Ellenore Scott | 6 | Contemporary/Jazz | 4th Place | | | | Tadd | |
| **Lauren Froderman** | 7 | Contemporary/Jazz | **Winner** | | | Tadd | | Marko |
| Kent Boyd | 7 | Contemporary/Jazz | Runner-up | | | | Sasha | |
| Robert Roldan | 7 | Contemporary/Jazz | 3rd Place | Clarice | | | | Melanie |

This contestant was eliminated this week.
This contestant was in the bottom 4 this week.
This All-Star did not perform this week.
This dancer won the competition.
All-Stars in bold text won the competition in their season.
This contestant runner-up.

== Ratings ==
=== U.S. Nielsen ratings ===
| Show | Episode | First air date | Rating (18–49) | Share (18–49) | Viewers (millions) | Rank (timeslot) | Rank (night) |
|---|---|---|---|---|---|---|---|
| 1 | Auditions #1 and #2: Atlanta and the Bay Area | May 26, 2011 | 5.2 | 9 | 9.5 | 1 | 2 |
| 2 | New York and Salt Lake City Auditions | June 1, 2011 | 5.0 | 8 | 8.6 | 1 | 1 |
| 3 | Los Angeles Auditions | June 2, 2011 | 4.7 | 8 | 8.1 | 2 | 5 |
| 4 | Las Vegas Callbacks | June 8, 2011 | 4.2 | 7 | 7.3 | 1 | 2 |
| 5 | Top 20 Revealed/Meet the Top 20 Performances | June 9, 2011 | 4.3 | 7 | 7.1 | 2 | 5 |
| 6 | Top 20 Perform | June 15, 2011 | 4.5 | 8 | 7.6 | 2 | 2 |
| 7 | 2 of 20 Voted Off | June 16, 2011 | 4.0 | 7 | 6.5 | 2 | 4 |
| 8 | Top 20 Perform Again | June 22, 2011 | 3.7 | 6 | 6.3 | 2 | 6 |
| 9 | 4 of 20 Voted Off | June 23, 2011 | 4.0 | 7 | 6.5 | 3 | 6 (tied) |
| 10 | Top 16 Perform | June 29, 2011 | 3.4 | 6 | 5.6 | 2 | 6 |
| 11 | 2 of 16 Voted Off | June 30, 2011 | 3.3 | 6 | 5.2 | 3 | 7 (tied) |
| 12 | Top 14 Perform | July 6, 2011 | 3.7 | 6 | 6.5 | 1 | 5 |
| 13 | 2 of 14 Voted Off | July 7, 2011 | 3.4 | 6 | 5.5 | 3 | 6 (tied) |
| 14 | Top 12 Perform | July 13, 2011 | 3.5 | 6 | 5.6 | 2 | 5 |
| 15 | 2 of 12 Voted Off | July 14, 2011 | 1.6 | 6 | 5.2 | 3 | 4 (tied) |
| 16 | Top 10 Perform | July 20, 2011 | 1.9 | 7 | 5.4 (Note: Nielsen split this episode into two, so a combined average is displayed here. The first half gained 5.4 million viewers with a 1.9/7 rating/share, ranked number 2 in the timeslot and number 3 for the night. The second half, which aired at 9 pm, gained 5.4 million viewers with a 1.9/6 rating/share, ranked number 3 in the timeslot and number 4 for the night.) | 2 | 3 |
| 17 | 2 of 10 Voted Off | July 21, 2011 | 3.2 | 6 | 5.3 | 3 | 7 |
| 18 | Top 8 Perform | July 27, 2011 | 3.7 | 6 | 6.1 | 2 | 4 |
| 19 | 2 of 8 Voted Off | July 28, 2011 | 3.4 | 6 | 5.4 | 3 | 6 |
| 20 | Top 6 Perform | August 3, 2011 | 3.4 | 6 | 5.5 | 2 | 6 |
| 21 | 2 of 6 Voted Off | August 4, 2011 | 3.3 | 6 | 5.4 | 3 | 6 (tied) |
| 22 | Season Finale, Part 1 | August 10, 2011 | 3.5 | 6 | 5.8 | 2 | 5 |
| 23 | Season Finale, Part 2 | August 11, 2011 | 3.8 | 6 | 6.1 | 2 | 3 |

== See also ==
- List of So You Think You Can Dance finalists
