= So You Think You Can Dance (American TV series) season 7 =

So You Think You Can Dance
- Season 7
- Hosted by: Cat Deeley
- Judges: Nigel Lythgoe; Adam Shankman; Mia Michaels
- Winner: Lauren Froderman
- Runner-up: Kent Boyd

Release
- Original network: Fox
- Original release: May 27 – August 12, 2010

Season chronology
- ← Previous; Season 6 Next → Season 8

So You Think You Can Dance is an American television reality program and dance competition airing on the Fox Broadcasting Company network. Season seven premiered on May 27, 2010. In the August 12 finale, contemporary/jazz contestant Lauren Froderman was named "America's Favorite Dancer" and received the grand prize of $250,000, as well as an appearance on the cover of Dance Spirit magazine and in print advertising for Gatorade. Contemporary dancer Kent Boyd was named runner-up.

== Judging panel ==
Nigel Lythgoe and Adam Shankman returned as permanent judges and Cat Deeley returned to host. Mary Murphy stepped down from her judging position, but guest judged during Las Vegas week and made an appearance at the finale. Mia Michaels became the third permanent judge for this season. During the auditions, various guest judges joined Lythgoe, including Shankman and Michaels along with others. This was Michael's only season as a permanent judge. It was announced in early 2011 that Murphy would return as a permanent judge for season 8. Michaels left because she felt she didn't fit well on the panel and wanted to do her own work without being linked to the show.

== Auditions ==
=== Open auditions ===
Audition	City	Date	Guest judges
Adrienne Arsht Center for the Performing Arts	Miami	January 18, 2010	Sonya Tayeh, Jason Gilkison
Paradise Theater	The Bronx, New York City	January 25, 2010	Mia Michaels, Adam Shankman
McFarlin Memorial Auditorium	Dallas	March 10, 2010	Tyce Diorio, Toni Redpath
Acuff Theatre	Nashville	March 14, 2010	Adam Shankman, Joey Dowling
Cadillac Palace Theatre	Chicago	March 18, 2010	Adam Shankman, Stacey Tookey
Orpheum Theatre	Los Angeles	March 26, 2010	Adam Shankman, Hi-Hat

=== Las Vegas week ===
Judges: Nigel Lythgoe, Mary Murphy, Adam Shankman, Toni Redpath, Lil' C, Tyce Diorio Day 1 kicks off with individual solos, Day 2 is hip-hop, Day 3 is cha-cha, Day 4 is broadway, Day 5 is group routines, Day 6 is Contemporary, and the final day is individual solos.

The Las Vegas callbacks were held at Planet Hollywood Resort and Casino in Las Vegas, Nevada.

Task/style	Music	Choreographer(s)
Individual Solo	Music Chosen by Contestant	The contestants
Hip-Hop	"OMG"—Usher ft. will.i.am	Tabitha D'umo
Cha-cha-cha	"Just Dance"—Lady Gaga	Toni Redpath
Broadway	"Charleston" from Billion Dollar Baby	Tyce Diorio
Group routines	Picked out of a hat	The contestants
Contemporary	"A Beautiful Mess"—Jason Mraz	Travis Wall
Individual solo	Music chosen by contestant	The contestant

== Studio Shows ==
=== Format changes ===
Executive producer Nigel Lythgoe has stated numerous format changes for this season. Instead of naming a top 20 to compete in the studio shows, the show planned on selecting a top 10 - they ended up accepting an extra contestant to create a top 11. The contestants were informed of their inclusion in the studio shows by the judges either traveling to each contestant's home or personally telephoning them to reveal their fate. This is in contrast to previous seasons where the contestants walked down a long corridor to face the judging panel.

Rather than partnering up the contestants with each other, partners were chosen at random each week from a pool of All-Stars composed of former top contestants that have appeared in previous seasons of the show, and the contestants performed in their All-Star partners' specialized style. Additionally, rather than sending home a pair of contestants each week, contestants were voted on as individuals from the beginning of the competition, and only one was sent home per week. Only three contestants were featured in the finale, as opposed to the usual four.

On June 16, 2010—the first performance show—host Cat Deeley revealed that the phone numbers viewers needed to dial to vote for their favorite contestant(s) were changed to 1-888-6BEST## from the usual 1-888-TEMPO##, ## being the numerical order of the contestant. This year also marks the first season in which, just like the results shows in all seasons prior, the performance shows were aired live, as opposed to being taped earlier in the week. This is also the first season to be broadcast in high-definition video.

=== Top 11 contestants ===
==== Female contestants ====
Contestant	Age	Home Town	Dance Style	Elimination date	Placement
Lauren Froderman	18	Phoenix, Arizona	Contemporary	August 12, 2010	Winner
Ashley Galvan	19	Thousand Oaks, California	Lyrical Jazz	July 15, 2010 (Injured)	Seventh
Melinda Sullivan	22	Jericho, New York	Tap	July 1, 2010	Ninth
Cristina Santana	24	San Diego, California	Salsa	June 24, 2010	Tenth
Alexie Agdeppa	26	Rowland Heights, California	Contemporary	June 17, 2010	Eleventh

==== Male contestants ====
Contestant	Age	Home Town	Dance Style	Elimination date	Placement
Kent Boyd	18	Botkins, Ohio	Contemporary	August 12, 2010	Runner-Up
Robert Roldan	19	Thousand Oaks, California	Contemporary	August 12, 2010	Third
AdéChiké Torbert	23	Brooklyn, New York	Contemporary	August 5, 2010	Fourth
Jose Ruiz	21	Pembroke Pines, Florida	Breakdance	July 29, 2010	Fifth
Billy Bell	19	Loxahatchee, Florida	Contemporary	July 29, 2010	Sixth
Alex Wong	23	Vancouver, British Columbia, Canada	Ballet	July 8, 2010 (Injured)	Eighth

=== Elimination chart ===
Legend
Female	Male	Bottom 3 contestants	Bottom 2 contestants	Injury

Result show date:	6/17	6/24	7/1	7/8	7/15	7/22	7/29	8/5	8/12
Contestant	Results								
Lauren Froderman							Btm 3		**Winner**
Kent Boyd									**Runner-Up**
Robert Roldan		Btm 3	Btm 3			Btm 2		Btm 2	**Elim**
AdéChiké Torbert								**Elim**	
Jose Ruiz					Btm 2	Btm 2	**Elim**		
Billy Bell			Btm 3	Btm 2	Btm 2	Injury	**Elim**		
Ashley Galvan				Btm 2	Injury				
Alex Wong				Injury					
Melinda Sullivan	Btm 3	Btm 3	**Elim**						
Cristina Santana	Btm 3	**Elim**							
Alexie Agdeppa	**Elim**								

=== Performance shows ===
The contestants that are marked in bold are the Season 7 contestants.

==== Meet the Top 11 (June 10, 2010) ====
- Performances:

Contestants	Style	Music	Choreographer(s)
All Contestants	Jazz	"Fame"—David Bowie	Wade Robson
**Kent Boyd**; **Lauren Froderman**; Mark Kanemura; Kathryn McCormick	Jazz	"Paris is Burning"—St. Vincent	Travis Wall (season 2)
**Alexie Agdeppa**; Lauren Gottlieb; Allison Holker; **Melinda Sullivan**	Broadway	"There's Gotta Be Something Better Than This" from Sweet Charity	Tyce Diorio
Stephen "Twitch" Boss; Comfort Fedoke; **Jose Ruiz**; Dominic Sandoval	Hip-Hop	"Din Daa Daa" (District 78 mix)—George Kranz	Tabitha and Napoleon D'umo
Anya Garnis; Pasha Kovalev; **Cristina Santana**	Samba	"Work" (Freemason remix)—Kelly Rowland	Jason Gilkison
**Billy Bell**; Ade Obayami; **Alex Wong**	Contemporary	"This Bitter Earth/On the Nature of Daylight"—Max Richter and Dinah Washington	Mia Michaels
Courtney Galiano; **Ashley Galvan**; Neil Haskell; **Robert Roldan**; **AdéChiké Torbert**	Jazz	"Freak"—Estelle feat. Kardinal Offishall	Sonya Tayeh

==== Week 1 (June 16, 2010) ====
- Performances:

Contestants	Style	Music	Choreographer(s)	Results
**Billy Bell**; Lauren Gottlieb	Broadway	"Footloose"—Kenny Loggins	Tyce Diorio	Safe
Mark Kanemura; **Cristina Santana**	Jazz	"Starstruck"—Santigold	Sonya Tayeh	Bottom 3
Comfort Fedoke; **Jose Ruiz**	Hip-Hop	"Beautiful Monster"—Ne-Yo	Tabitha and Napoleon D'umo	Safe
Kathryn McCormick; **AdéChiké Torbert**	Jazz	"Addicted to Love"—Florence and the Machine	Travis Wall (season 2)	Safe
Pasha Kovalev; **Melinda Sullivan**	Jive	"L-O-V-E"—VV Brown	Tony Meredith; Melanie LaPatin	Bottom 3
Allison Holker; **Alex Wong**	Contemporary	"Hallelujah"—Jeff Buckley	Sonya Tayeh	Safe
**Alexie Agdeppa**; Stephen "Twitch" Boss	Hip-Hop	"Butterfly"—Jason Mraz	Tabitha and Napoleon D'umo	Eliminated
**Lauren Froderman**; Ade Obayomi	Pop-Jazz	"Oh Yeah"—Yello	Mandy Moore	Safe
**Kent Boyd**; Anya Garnis	Cha-cha-cha	"Lady Marmalade"—Diva Invasion	Tony Meredith; Melanie LaPatin	Safe
**Ashley Galvan**; Neil Haskell	Contemporary	"For All We Know"—Roberta Flack & Donny Hathaway	Tyce Diorio	Safe
Courtney Galiano; **Robert Roldan**	African Jazz	"Norweg" from Saltimbanco	Sean Cheesman	Safe

==== Week 2 (June 23, 2010) ====
- Performances:

Contestants	Style	Music	Choreographer(s)	Results
Pasha Kovalev; **Cristina Santana**	Paso Doble	"Ira Deorum/Sanctus"—James Dooley	Jean-Marc Généreux; France Mousseau	Eliminated
Allison Holker; **AdéChiké Torbert**	Contemporary	"Listen to Your Heart" (Edmee's Unplugged Vocal Edit)—DHT	Mandy Moore	Safe
Lauren Gottlieb; **Alex Wong**	Broadway	"Summertime"—Sylvester	Tyce Diorio	Safe
**Ashley Galvan**; Mark Kanemura	Lyrical Jazz	"Wonderful"—Annie Lennox	Travis Wall	Safe
**Billy Bell**; Comfort Fedoke	Krumping	"So U Think U Can Krump"—Tha J-Squad	Lil' C	Safe
Anya Garnis; **Robert Roldan**	Argentine Tango	"Libertango"—Bond	Jean-Marc Généreux; France Mousseau	Bottom 3
Ade Obayomi; **Melinda Sullivan**	Contemporary	"Squander"—Skunk Anansie	Stacey Tookey	Bottom 3
Kathryn McCormick; **Jose Ruiz**	Bollywood	"Marjaani Marjaani Kasama" from Billu	Nakul Dev Mahajan	Safe
**Lauren Froderman**; Dominic “D-Trix” Sandoval	Lyrical hip-hop	"If I Were a Boy"—Beyoncé Knowles	Tessandra Chavez	Safe
**Kent Boyd**; Courtney Galiano	Jazz	"Amy Amy Amy"—Amy Winehouse	Tyce Diorio	Safe

==== Week 3 (June 30, 2010) ====
- Performances:

Contestants	Style	Music	Choreographer(s)	Results
Lauren Gottlieb; **AdéChiké Torbert**	Hip-hop	"Hot-N-Fun"—N.E.R.D ft. Nelly Furtado	Dave Scott	Safe
**Ashley Galvan**; Ade Obayomi	Contemporary	"Cosmic Love"—Florence and the Machine	Dee Caspary	Safe
Courtney Galiano; **Robert Roldan**	Jazz	"XXXO"—M.I.A.	Sonya Tayeh	Bottom 3
Pasha Kovalev; **Melinda Sullivan**	Salsa	"Magdalena, Mi Amor" (Quimbara)—D.L.G.	Fabian Sanchez	Eliminated
**Lauren Froderman**; Neil Haskell	Broadway	"Let Me Entertain You"—Debbie Gibson	Joey Dowling	Safe
**Billy Bell**; Kathryn McCormick	Contemporary	"Jar of Hearts"—Christina Perri	Stacey Tookey	Bottom 3
Anya Garnis; **Jose Ruiz**	Samba	"Long Time"—Shakira	Dmitry Chaplin	Safe
**Kent Boyd**; Allison Holker	Jazz	"Heartburn"—Alicia Keys	Mandy Moore	Safe
**Alex Wong**; Stephen "Twitch" Boss	Hip-hop	"Outta Your Mind" (District 78 mix)—Lil Jon and LMFAO	Napoleon and Tabitha D'umo	Safe

- Solos:

Contestant	Style	Music	Result
Billy Bell	Jazz	"Something Bigger, Something Better"—Amanda Blank	Bottom 3
Jose Ruiz	Breaking	"Super Bad"—James Brown	Safe
Kent Boyd	Contemporary	"Down" (Candlelight Remix)—Jay Sean	Safe
Alex Wong	Ballet	"Rule the Planet" from Planet of the Apes	Safe
Ashley Galvan	Jazz	"Royal T"—Crookers feat. Róisín Murphy	Safe
Robert Roldan	Contemporary	"Hold You in My Arms"—Ray LaMontagne	Bottom 3
Melinda Sullivan	Tap	"Empire State of Mind (Part II) Broken Down"—Alicia Keys	Eliminated
AdéChiké Torbert	Contemporary	"Ruthless Gravity"—Craig Armstrong	Safe
Lauren Froderman	Contemporary	"Unchained Melody"—Cyndi Lauper	Safe

==== Week 4 (July 7, 2010) ====
- Performances:

Contestants	Style	Music	Choreographer(s)	Result
**Lauren Froderman**; Pasha Kovalev	Cha-cha-cha	"Telephone"—Lady Gaga and Beyoncé Knowles	Jean-Marc Généreux; France Mousseau	Safe
Lauren Gottlieb; **Jose Ruiz**	Contemporary	"Never Tear Us Apart"—INXS	Mandy Moore	Safe
**Kent Boyd**; Comfort Fedoke	Hip-hop	"You're Not My Girl"—Ryan Leslie	Dave Scott	Safe
Courtney Galiano; **AdéChiké Torbert**	Jazz	"Is You Is or Is You Ain't My Baby" (Rae & Christian Remix)—Dinah Washington	Mandy Moore	Safe
**Billy Bell**; Katee Shean^{1}	Broadway	"Macavity: The Mystery Cat" from Cats	Spencer Liff	Bottom 3
**Ashley Galvan**; Dominic “D-Trix” Sandoval	Hip-hop	"How Low"—Ludacris	Tabitha and Napoleon D'umo	Bottom 3
Kathryn McCormick; **Robert Roldan**	Jazz	"Sinking Feeling"—Róisín Murphy	Sean Cheesman	Safe
Marla^{2} **AdéChiké Torbert**	Bollywood	"Mourya Re" from Don: The Chase Begins Again	Nakul Dev Mahajan	Alex Wong (Injured) Withdrew
**Kent Boyd**; **Lauren Froderman**	Contemporary	"Collide" (Acoustic version)—Howie Day	Travis Wall	Safe
**Ashley Galvan**; **Robert Roldan**	Quickstep	"Man with the Hex"—Atomic Fireballs	Jean-Marc Généreux; France Mousseau	Galvan Bottom 3
**Billy Bell**; **Jose Ruiz**	African Jazz	"The Hunt"—Mickey Hart	Sean Cheesman	Bell Bottom 3

- **^1** Shean was asked to step in due to an injury sustained by Allison Holker.
- **^2** Marla, the assistant choreographer, was asked to step in due to contestant Alex Wong sustaining an injury during rehearsal that would force his withdrawal from the competition.
- Alex would have done the foxtrot with Anya, but due to his injury, it was cancelled.

==== Week 5 (July 14, 2010) ====
- Performances:

Contestants	Style	Music	Choreographer(s)	Result
**Lauren Froderman**; Mark Kanemura	Tahitian	"Jungle"—Last Voices	Tiana Liufau	Safe
Anya Garnis; **AdéChiké Torbert**	Salsa	"Oyelo Que Te Conviene"—Eddie Palmieri	Liz Lira; Danny Davalos	Safe
Courtney Galiano; **Jose Ruiz**	Broadway	"Mister Cellophane" from Chicago	Joey Dowling	Bottom 3
Allison Holker; **Robert Roldan**	Contemporary	"Fix You"—Coldplay	Travis Wall	Safe
**Billy Bell**; Anya Garnis	Jive	"Paradise by the Dashboard Light"—Meat Loaf	Louis van Amstel	Bottom 3
**Kent Boyd**; Neil Haskell	Broadway	"Shoeless Joe From Hannibal, MO" from Damn Yankees	Tyce Diorio	Safe
**Billy Bell**; **Lauren Froderman**	Jazz	"Boogie Shoes"—KC & the Sunshine Band	Mandy Moore	Bell Bottom 3
**Jose Ruiz**; Dominic “D-Trix” Sandoval	B-boying	"Battle for the Beat"—District 78	Tabitha and Napoleon D'umo	Bottom 3
**Kent Boyd**; **AdéChiké Torbert**	Contemporary	"You Only Disappear"—Tom McRae	Dee Caspary	Both Safe
**Robert Roldan**; Kathryn McCormick^{6}	Disco	"Instant Replay"—Dan Hartman	Doriana Sanchez	Safe

- Ashley was supposed to do a rumba routine with Pasha, but due to her injury, it was cancelled.

==== Week 6 (July 21, 2010) ====
- Guest Judge: Kenny Ortega
- Performances:

Contestants	Style	Music	Choreographer(s)	Result
Stephen "Twitch" Boss; **Lauren Froderman**	Hip-hop	"My Chick Bad"—Ludacris ft. Nicki Minaj	Napoleon and Tabitha D'umo	Safe
Allison Holker; **Jose Ruiz**	Contemporary	Eternal Sunshine of the Spotless Mind theme—Jon Brion	Sonya Tayeh	Bottom 3
Lauren Gottlieb; **Robert Roldan**	Jazz	"Wasted Time"—My Life with the Thrill Kill Kult	Tyce Diorio	Bottom 3
**Kent Boyd**; Kathryn McCormick	Jazz	"Tightrope"—Janelle Monáe	Sonya Tayeh	Safe
Comfort Fedoke; **AdéChiké Torbert**	Lyrical Hip-hop	"Fallin'"—Alicia Keys	Napoleon and Tabitha D'umo	Safe
**Lauren Froderman**; **Robert Roldan**	Samba	"Drummer Boy" (SYTYCD Remix)—Debi Nova	Dmitry Chaplin	Roldan Bottom 3
**Jose Ruiz**; **AdéChiké Torbert**	Paso Doble	"The Arrival/Rampage/Continued Existence"—James Dooley	Dmitry Chaplin	Ruiz Bottom 3
**Kent Boyd**; Stephen "Twitch" Boss^{9}	Stepping	"Pro Nails" (Rusko remix)—Kid Sister	Chuck Maldonado	Safe

- Billy was to be partnered with Courtney, unfortunately, the routine was cancelled due to his injury. He was still able to perform the following week.
- Solos:

Contestant	Style	Music	Result
AdéChiké Torbert	Contemporary	"This Woman's Work"—Maxwell	Safe
Robert Roldan	Contemporary	"Parachutes"—Trevor Hall	Bottom 3
Lauren Froderman	Contemporary	"The Waves"—Elisa	Safe
Jose Ruiz	Breakdancing	"Give It Up or Turnit a Loose"—James Brown	Bottom 3
Kent Boyd	Contemporary	"End of the Road" (A capella)—Boyz II Men	Safe

==== Week 7 (July 28, 2010) ====
- Guest Judge: Toni Redpath
- Performances:

Contestants	Style	Music	Choreographer(s)	Result
**Kent Boyd**; Anya Garnis	Cha-cha-cha	"My First Kiss"—3OH!3 ft. Ke$ha	Jean-Marc Généreux; France Mousseau	Safe
Kathryn McCormick; **Robert Roldan**	Contemporary	"Heaven Is a Place on Earth"—Katie Thompson	Stacey Tookey	Safe
Courtney Galiano; **AdéChiké Torbert**	Jazz	"Manteca"—Dizzy Gillespie	Tyce Diorio	Safe
Comfort Fedoke; **Jose Ruiz**	Hip-hop	"Try a Little Tenderness"—Otis Redding	Marty Kudelka; Dana Wilson	Ruiz Eliminated
**Lauren Froderman**; Allison Holker	Broadway	"Who's Got the Pain?" from Damn Yankees	Tyce Diorio	Bottom 3
**Billy Bell**; Ade Obayomi	Contemporary	"Mad World" (Alternate Version)—Michael Andrews ft. Gary Jules	Stacey Tookey	Bell Eliminated
**Kent Boyd**; **Jose Ruiz**	Broadway	"From This Moment On" from Kiss Me, Kate	Spencer Liff	Ruiz Eliminated
**Lauren Froderman**; **AdéChiké Torbert**	Foxtrot	"Fever"—Beyoncé Knowles	Jean-Marc Généreux; France Mousseau	Froderman Bottom 3
**Billy Bell**; **Robert Roldan**	Bollywood	"Ganesh" from Bombay Dreams	Nakul Dev Mahajan	Bell Eliminated

- Solos:

Contestant	Style	Music	Result
Jose Ruiz	B-boying	"Giant Squid"—RJD2	Eliminated
Lauren Froderman	Contemporary	"(You Make Me Feel Like) A Natural Woman"—Aretha Franklin	Bottom 3
Billy Bell	Contemporary	"Lights Go Down"—Telepathe	Eliminated
Kent Boyd	Contemporary	"A Song For You"—Elliott Yamin	Safe
Robert Roldan	Contemporary	"A Beautiful Mess" (A Raining Jane sessions)—Jason Mraz	Safe
AdéChiké Torbert	Contemporary	"Pretty Wings"—Maxwell	Safe

==== Week 8 (August 4, 2010) ====
- Guest Judge: Tyce Diorio
- Group dance (Top 4): "The Crapshooter's Dance" from Guys and Dolls
- Performances:

Contestants	Style	Music	Choreographer(s)	Result
**Lauren Froderman**; Pasha Kovalev	Argentine Tango	"Oblivion"—Ástor Piazzolla	Miriam Larici; Leonardo Barrionuevo	Safe
Lauren Gottlieb; **AdéChiké Torbert**	African Jazz	"The Path"—Ralph MacDonald	Sean Cheesman	Eliminated
**Robert Roldan**; Anya Garnis	Viennese Waltz	"Lost"—Anouk	Jonathan Roberts	Bottom 2
**Kent Boyd**; Courtney Galiano	Disco	"When Love Takes Over"—Kelly Rowland feat. David Guetta	Doriana Sanchez	Safe
**Lauren Froderman**; Ade Obayomi	Commercial Jazz	"Hide U" (John Creamer and Stephane K Remix)—Kosheen	Sean Cheesman	Safe
Kathryn McCormick; **AdéChiké Torbert**	Contemporary	"Fearless Love"—Melissa Etheridge	Dwight Rhoden; Desmond Richardson	Eliminated
**Robert Roldan**; Dominic “D-Trix” Sandoval	Hip-hop	"Scars"—Basement Jaxx feat. Kelis, Meleka and Chipmunk	Napoleon and Tabitha D'umo	Bottom 2
**Kent Boyd**; Neil Haskell	Contemporary	"How It Ends"—DeVotchKa	Travis Wall	Safe

==== Week 9 (August 11, 2010) ====
Contestants	Style	Music	Choreographer(s)
**Kent Boyd**; Lauren Gottlieb	Bollywood	"Om Mangalam" from Kambakkht Ishq	Nakul Dev Mahajan
Stephen "Twitch" Boss; **Lauren Froderman**	Hip-hop	"Power"—Kanye West	Napoleon and Tabitha D'umo
Mark Kanemura; **Robert Roldan**	Jazz	"Whip It"—Devo	Tyce Diorio
**Lauren Froderman**; **Robert Roldan**	Contemporary	"That Home"—The Cinematic Orchestra	Dee Caspary
**Kent Boyd**; **Lauren Froderman**	Jazz	"Hip to Be Square"—Huey Lewis and the News	Mandy Moore
**Kent Boyd**; Allison Holker	Contemporary	"Sundrenched World" (Live Session)—Joshua Radin	Stacey Tookey
Kathryn McCormick; **Robert Roldan**	Broadway	"Cool" from West Side Story	Spencer Liff
**Lauren Froderman**; Pasha Kovalev	Cha-cha-cha	"Not Myself Tonight"—Christina Aguilera	Tony Meredith; Melanie LaPatin
**Kent Boyd**; **Robert Roldan**	Malevos	"The Chosen/Drum Addict"—Taylor Long	Miriam Larici; Leonardo Barrionuevo

- Solos:

Contestant	Style	Music
Kent Boyd	Contemporary	"The Finish Line"—Train
Robert Roldan	Contemporary	"The District Sleeps Alone Tonight"—The Postal Service
Lauren Froderman	Contemporary	"I'm Going Down"—Mary J. Blige

=== Result shows ===
==== Results show musical performances ====
Week	Performer(s)	Title	Performance type
Week 1	Usher	"OMG"	pre-recorded performance
Week 1	Justin Bieber feat. Usher	"Somebody to Love"	music video premiere
Week 2	Debi Nova	"Drummer Boy"	live performance
Week 3	Ne-Yo	"Beautiful Monster"	pre-recorded performance
Week 4	Natasha Bedingfield	"Touch"	live performance
Week 5	Christina Perri	"Jar of Hearts"	pre-recorded performance
Week 6	Enrique Iglesias feat. Pitbull	"I Like It	pre-recorded performance
Week 7	Christian TV	"When She Turns 18"	live performance
Week 7	Allison Iraheta feat. Orianthi	"Don't Waste the Pretty"	pre-recorded performance
Week 8	Janelle Monáe	"Tightrope"	live performance
Week 8	Flo Rida	"Club Can't Handle Me"	live performance
Finale	Black Gold	"Shine"	live performance

==== Week 1 (June 17, 2010) ====
- Group dance: Top 11: "Acapella"—Kelis (Jazz; Choreographer: Tessandra Chavez)
- Guest dancer(s): Keith Roberts and Karine Plantadit
- Bottom 3 contestant's solos:

Contestant	Style	Music	Result
Melinda Sullivan	Tap	"I Got the Feelin'"—James Brown	Safe
Alexie Agdeppa	Jazz	"I've Been Loving You Too Long"—Otis Redding	Eliminated
Cristina Santana	Salsa	"La Guarachera"—Celia Cruz and Tito Puente	Safe

==== Week 2 (June 24, 2010) ====
- Group dance: Top 10: "Royal T"—Crookers feat. Róisín Murphy (Jazz; Choreographer: Sonya Tayeh)
- Guest dancer(s): RemoteKontrol featuring Bryan Gaynor dancing to Eskimo's "Agnus Dei"
- Bottom 3 contestant's solos:

Contestant	Style	Music	Result
Cristina Santana	Salsa	"Quimbara"—Celia Cruz & Johnny Pacheco	Eliminated
Melinda Sullivan	Tap	"Heels"—Q-Tip	Safe
Robert Roldan	Contemporary	"Everywhere I Go"—Lissie	Safe

==== Week 3 (July 1, 2010) ====
- Group dance: Top 9: "O Fortuna" from Carmina Burana—London Symphony Orchestra & Richard Hickox (Contemporary; Choreographer: Jamel Gaines)
- Guest dancer(s):
  - Viva Elvis (Cirque du Soleil)
  - All-Stars Courtney Galiano & Mark Kanemura - "The Garden" from Season 4
- Bottom 3 contestant's solos:

Contestant	Style	Music	Result
Billy Bell	Contemporary	"Fly"—Ludovico Einaudi	Safe
Robert Roldan	Jazz	"Hater"—Various Production	Safe
Melinda Sullivan	Tap	None^{3}	Eliminated

^3 Sullivan chose to dance a cappella.

==== Week 4 (July 8, 2010) ====
- Group dance: "When We Dance"—Sting (Contemporary; Choreographer: Mia Michaels)
- Guest dancer(s):
  - Touring cast of In the Heights: "96,000" from In the Heights (Choreographer: Andy Blankenbuehler)
  - All-Stars Pasha & Anya - Cha-Cha from Season 3 Auditions; Song: "Magic Carpet Ride"—Mighty Dub Katz
- Bottom 3 contestant's solos:

Contestant	Style	Music	Result
Alex Wong	N/A^{5}		Withdrew
Billy Bell	Contemporary	"To Build a Home"—The Cinematic Orchestra	Safe
Ashley Galvan	Contemporary	"Lost" (Acoustic version)—Anouk	Safe

^4 Wong sustained an injury to his Achilles tendon during rehearsal and was unable to perform during the show on 7/7/2010. He was therefore automatically placed in the bottom 3 and in danger of elimination. Due to the seriousness of the injury, Wong needed surgery and 3 months of recuperation and was forced to leave the competition, causing both Bell and Galvan to be safe to continue into the next week.

==== Week 5 (July 15, 2010) ====
- Group dance: "Charleston" from Billion Dollar Baby (Broadway; Choreographer: Tyce Diorio)
- Guest dancer(s):
  - Fernando Martín-Gullans and Lauren Vayser from Mary Murphy's Champion Ballroom Academy ("Jailhouse Rock"—Elvis Presley); Jive
  - Jamar Roberts and Rachael McLaren from the Alvin Ailey American Dance Theater ("Gravity's Angel"—Laurie Anderson; Contemporary ballet)
  - All-Stars Twitch & Comfort: ("Forever"—Chris Brown; Choreographer: Dave Scott; Hip-hop)
- Bottom 3 contestant's solos:

Contestant	Style	Music	Result
Ashley Galvan	N/A^{5}		Withdrew
Billy Bell	Contemporary	"Stand by Me"—Ben E. King	Safe
Jose Ruiz	Breaking	"Chicken Bone Circuit"—RJD2	Safe

^5 Galvan sustained an injury to a rib on Monday July 12, 2010. Unable to perform, she was automatically placed in the bottom 3 for the week.

==== Week 6 (July 22, 2010) ====
- Group dance: "All That Jazz"—Lea DeLaria; Choreographer: Kelley Abbey
- Guest dancer(s):
  - Soloists Yuriko Kajiya and Jared Matthews from American Ballet Theatre-Don Quixote Act III Grand Pas de Deux
  - DJ Smart-Contemporary
  - All-Stars Lauren & Neil - Jazz from Season 3 "Night of the Dancing Flame" - Róisín Murphy
- Bottom 3 contestant's solos:

Contestant	Style	Music	Result
Billy Bell	N/A		Safe
Robert Roldan	Contemporary	"Fireflies"—Ron Pope	Safe
Jose Ruiz	B-boying	"It's Just Begun"—Jimmy Castor Bunch	Safe

^6 The judges chose not to send home anyone, which means that two contestants are to be sent home in week seven.

==== Week 7 (July 29, 2010) ====
- Group dance: "Every Little Thing She Does Is Magic"—Sting (Contemporary; Choreographer: Mia Michaels)
- Guest dancer(s): Cast of Step Up 3D, to "Already Taken" by Trey Songz, "My Own Step (Theme from Step Up 3D)" by Roscoe Dash & T-Pain featuring Fabo and "This Instant" by Sophia Fresh featuring T-Pain
- Bottom 3 contestant's solos:

Contestant	Style	Music	Result
Jose Ruiz	B-boying	"Hot Music"—Soho	Eliminated
Billy Bell	Contemporary	"Szerencsetlen"—Venetian Snares	Eliminated
Lauren Froderman	Contemporary Jazz	"Let's Get It On"—Marvin Gaye	Safe

==== Week 8 (August 5, 2010) ====
- Group dance (All-Stars): "Drumming Song"—Florence & the Machine (Contemporary; Choreographer: Dee Caspary)
- Guest dancer(s): Desmond Richardson ("Sympathy for the Devil"—The Rolling Stones)
- Solos:

Contestant	Style	Music	Result
Lauren Froderman	Contemporary	"Wasted Time"—Me'Shell Ndegeocello	Safe
Kent Boyd	Jazz	"Dynamite"—Taio Cruz	Safe
AdeChike Torbert	Contemporary	"Sir"—Various Artists	Eliminated
Robert Roldan	Jazz	"Mr. Muscle"—Rusko	Bottom 2

==== Week 9 (Finale) (August 12, 2010) ====
- Judges: Tyce Diorio, Kenny Ortega, Stacey Tookey, Mary Murphy, Adam Shankman, Mia Michaels, Nigel Lythgoe
- Guest dancers:
  - Quest Crew ("Suzy"—Caravan Palace)
  - The Manzari Brothers and 7-year-old Luke (Tap)
  - Lil' C and Season 6's winner Russell Ferguson (Krumping; "Hazardous"—Buckmouth)
  - SYTYCD U.K. winner Charlie Bruce and Neil Haskell ("I Surrender"—Celine Dion; Choreographer: Mandy Moore)
  - Ellen DeGeneres and Stephen "Twitch" Boss in tribute to Alex Wong ("Outta Your Mind"—Lil Jon and LMFAO; Choreographers: Tabitha and Napoleon D'umo)
- Group dances:

Contestant	Style	Music	Choreographer
Top 11 + All-stars	Hip-Hop	RA —Nathan Lanier	Christopher Scott

===== Judges' picks =====
Contestants	Style	Music	Choreographer	Chosen by
**Kent Boyd**; Neil Haskell	Broadway	"Shoeless Joe" from Damn Yankees	Tyce DiOrio	Kenny Ortega
**Billy Bell**; Ade Obayomi	Contemporary	"Mad World" (Alternate Version)—Michael Andrews feat. Gary Jules	Stacey Tookey	Nigel Lythgoe
Comfort Fedoke; **AdéChiké Torbert**	Lyrical Hip-hop	"Fallin'"—Alicia Keys	Napoleon and Tabitha D'umo	Mia Michaels
**Kent Boyd**; Anya Garnis	Cha-cha-cha	"My First Kiss"—3OH!3 feat. Ke$ha	Jean-Marc Généreux; France Mousseau	Cat Deeley
**Robert Roldan**; Dominic “D-Trix” Sandoval	Hip-hop	"Scars"—Basement Jaxx feat. Kelis, Meleka and Chipmunk	Napoleon and Tabitha D'umo	Tyce DiOrio
**Lauren Froderman**; Pasha Kovalev	Argentine Tango	"Oblivion"—Ástor Piazzolla	Miriam Larici; Leonardo Barrionuevo	Nigel Lythgoe
Allison Holker; **Robert Roldan**	Contemporary	"Fix You"—Coldplay	Travis Wall	Adam Shankman
**Jose Ruiz**; Dominic “D-Trix”Sandoval	Breakdance	"Battle for the Beat"—District 78	Napoleon and Tabitha D'umo	Mary Murphy
Stephen "Twitch" Boss; **Lauren Froderman**	Hip-hop	"My Chick Bad"—Ludacris feat. Nicki Minaj	Napoleon and Tabitha D'umo	Adam Shankman
Allison Holker; **Alex Wong**	Contemporary	"Hallelujah"—Jeff Buckley	Sonya Tayeh	Cat Deeley
**Billy Bell**; **Robert Roldan**	Bollywood	"Ganesh" from Bombay Dreams	Nakul Dev Mahajan	Stacey Tookey
**Kent Boyd**; Neil Haskell	Contemporary	"How It Ends"—DeVotchKa	Travis Wall	Mia Michaels

- **Eliminated**
  - Robert Roldan
- **Runner-up**
  - Kent Boyd
- **Winner**
  - Lauren Froderman

== All-Stars Dance Pool ==
The All-Stars Dance Pool features some of the best and most popular contestants that have been featured on previous seasons. They acted as pairs for the top eleven contestants this season, and rotated every week. Each of the dancers represents one specific style of dance and only danced in that genre with a partner. They did not choreograph any routines but learned them just as the contestants did.

All-Stars, Contestant Partners, and Results
Former Contestant	Season	Dance Styles	Placement	Contestant										
Former Contestant	Season	Dance Styles	Placement	Week 1	Week 2	Week 3	Week 4	Week 5		Week 6		Week 7	Week 8	Week 9
Allison Holker	2	Contemporary/Jazz	Top 8	Alex	AdéChiké	Kent	Billy^{7}	Robert		Jose		Lauren		Kent
Anya Garnis	3	Ballroom/Latin	Top 12	Kent	Robert	Jose	Alex	AdéChiké	Billy			Kent	Robert	
Dominic Sandoval	3	Hip Hop/Breaking	Top 8		Lauren		Ashley	Jose					Robert	
Lauren Gottlieb	3	Contemporary/Jazz/Hip Hop	Top 6	Billy	Alex	AdéChiké	Jose			Robert			AdéChiké	Kent
Neil Haskell	3	Contemporary/Jazz	3rd Place	Ashley		Lauren		Kent					Kent	
Pasha Kovalev	3	Ballroom/Latin	Top 6	Melinda	Cristina	Melinda	Lauren	Ashley					Lauren	Lauren
Comfort Fedoke	4	Hip Hop/Krump	Top 8	Jose	Billy		Kent			AdéChiké		Jose		
Mark Kanemura	4	Contemporary/Jazz	Top 6	Cristina	Ashley			Lauren						Robert
Stephen "Twitch" Boss	4	Popping/Locking/Krump	Runner-up	Alexie		Alex				Lauren	Kent^{9}			Lauren
Courtney Galiano	4	Contemporary/Jazz	4th Place	Robert	Kent	Robert	AdéChiké	Jose		Billy		AdéChiké	Kent	
Ade Obayomi	5	Contemporary/Jazz	Top 6	Lauren	Melinda	Ashley						Billy	Lauren	
Kathryn McCormick	6	Contemporary/Jazz	3rd Place	AdéChiké	Jose	Billy	Robert	Robert^{8}		Kent		Robert	AdéChiké	Robert

- ^7 Allison had an old back injury flare up so for this dance she was replaced by Season 4's Katee Shean (3rd Place)
- ^8 McCormick was asked to step in for competing contestant Ashley Galvan, who suffered a rib injury and was unable to compete.
- ^9 Boss was asked to step in for competing contestant Billy Bell, who suffered a knee injury and did not compete.

This contestant was eliminated this week.
This contestant was in the bottom 2 this week
This contestant was in the bottom 3 this week.
This contestant did not perform this week due to injury making it the dancer's routine with all-star cancelled.
Due to a pair's injury, this All-star stepped in to perform with the injured pair's contestant partner.
This All-Star did not perform this week and had someone else step in for them.
This All-Star did not perform this week.
This contestant won the competition

== Tour ==
The SYTYCD 2010 Season 7 tour took place in 40 cities across the US, creating many sold-out shows. It took place from the end of September to the end of November. The dancers from Season 7 for the tour were Lauren Froderman, Kent Boyd, Robert Roldan, AdéChiké Torbert, Billy Bell, Jose Ruiz, and Ashley Galvan. The all-stars for the tour were Allison Holker from Season 2, Dominic Sandoval from Season 3, Courtney Galiano from Season 4, Ade Obayomi from Season 5 and Kathryn McCormick from Season 6. Also featured was the winner of Season 6, Russell Ferguson.

== Ratings ==
=== U.S. Nielsen ratings ===
Show	Episode	First air date	Rating (18–49)	Share (18–49)	Viewers (millions)	Rank (timeslot)	Rank (night)
1	Auditions #1 and #2	May 27, 2010	5.0	9	8.2	1	3
2	Auditions #3 and #4	June 2, 2010	4.6	8	7.4	1	4
3	Auditions #5 and #6 / Vegas Callbacks, Part 1	June 3, 2010	5.3	9	8.7	1	3
4	Vegas Callbacks, Pt. 2	June 9, 2010	5.0	9	8.1	1	3
5	Meet The Top 11	June 10, 2010	4.1	7	6.8	3	5
6	Top 11 Perform	June 16, 2010	4.0	7	6.6	3	6
7	1 of 11 Voted Off	June 17, 2010	3.8	6	6.2	3	6
8	Top 10 Perform	June 23, 2010	3.9	7	6.4	2	5
9	1 of 10 Voted Off	June 24, 2010	3.9	7	6.4	3	6
10	Top 9 Perform	June 30, 2010	3.6	7	5.9	2	6
11	1 of 9 Voted Off	July 1, 2010	3.7	7	5.8	3	6
12	Top 8 Perform	July 7, 2010	2.4	8	6.5 (Note: Nielsen split this episode into two, so a combined average is displayed here. The first half gained 6.4 million viewers with a 2.3/8 rating/share, ranked number 1 in the timeslot and number 3 for the night. The second half, which aired at 9 pm, gained 6.5 million viewers with a 2.5/8 rating/share, ranked number 2 in the timeslot and number 2 for the night.)	1	2
13	1 of 8 Voted Off	July 8, 2010	3.9	7	6.2	2	5
14	Top 7 Perform	July 14, 2010	3.7	7	6.0	3	6 (tied)
15	1 of 7 Voted Off	July 15, 2010	3.5	6	5.7	3	6
16	Top 6 Perform	July 21, 2010	3.6	6	5.8	3	7
17	1 of 6 Voted Off	July 22, 2010	3.7	6	5.7	3	6
18	Top 5 Perform	July 28, 2010	3.3	6	5.4	3	6
19	1 of 5 Voted Off	July 29, 2010	3.5	6	5.9	3	6 (tied)
20	Top 4 Perform	August 4, 2010	3.6	6	6.1	3	7
21	1 of 4 Voted Off	August 5, 2010	3.4	6	5.6	3	6
22	Top 3 Perform	August 11, 2010	3.6	6	6.1	3	7
23	Winner Announced	August 12, 2010	4.1	7	6.7	2	3 (tied)

== See also ==
- List of So You Think You Can Dance finalists
