= Sonya Tayeh =

American choreographer

- Born: 1977 or 1978 (age 48–49); New York City, New York
- Education: Dance (BS/BFA)
- Alma mater: Wayne State University
- Occupation: Choreographer
- Years active: 2002–present

Sonya Tayeh is a New York City-based choreographer. She has worked nationally and internationally across the worlds of dance and theater.

She has earned several accolades for her work, including the Tony award for her choreography work on the Broadway production of Moulin Rouge!, Emmy nominations for Fox's So You Think You Can Dance, and the Lucille Lortel and Obie Awards for “Outstanding Choreography” for her work on David Henry Hwang's dance-play Kung Fu, for which she also received a Drama Desk nomination.

== Life and career ==
=== Early life and education ===
Tayeh was born in Brooklyn, New York and raised in Detroit, Michigan, the daughter of a Lebanese mother and Palestinian father. She has two sisters and one half-brother. Tayeh started dancing at age 15 when she began frequenting hip-hop and house dance parties with her sister. She started studying ballet and modern dance—as a subject—at age 17 when she was a student at Henry Ford Community College. Although Tayeh was a freestyle house dancer in her youth, she did not take any formal dance classes until she was 18 and a student at Wayne State University. Before starting her training, she was denied by six dance studios who wouldn't let her take classes because they felt she was too old. In addition to her classes, Tayeh was a member of Counter Groove and Full Circle dance companies.

During her time at Wayne State, Tayeh drew on dance history, anatomy, and performance to develop a style that is built on core strength, aggressive partner interaction, quirky, and stylized movements. She graduated Wayne State in 2002 with a bachelor's degree in Dance.

=== Dance career and mainstream exposure ===
Since gaining mainstream exposure, Tayeh has choreographed tours and/or live events for Madonna, Florence and the Machine, Kylie Minogue, Kerli, and Miley Cyrus. She has also choreographed for Steed Lord and spent three years in residence with the Los Angeles Ballet. In 2010, she choreographed indie singer Lucy Schwartz' music video "Graveyard".

Tayeh choreographed the rock musical The Last Goodbye which is based on Romeo and Juliet and set to a soundtrack of music by Jeff Buckley. It premiered in 2010, but a revised version of the show with a new cast opened in September 2013 at the Old Globe Theatre in San Diego, California. In 2011, she choreographed San Jose Repertory Theatre's production of Spring Awakening. In 2014, she choreographed an off-Broadway play based on Bruce Lee's life called Kung Fu. It premiered February 24 with So You Think You Can Dance alumnus Cole Horibe playing the lead role.

In 2015 Martha Graham Dance Company commissioned a new work by Sonya Tayeh which she set to the music of Meredith Monk. It premiered in the company's New York season at The Joyce, Spring 2015 and has been performed by the company while on tour.

Sonya earned a Tony award for her choreography of the Broadway musical, "Moulin Rouge".

==== Choreography for So You Think You Can Dance ====
Season	Week	Dancers	Style	Song	Note
4	3	Kourtni Lind; Matt Dorame	Contemporary	"Wrestlers (Sticky, Dirty Pop Mix)"—Hot Chip	
4	6	Chelsie Hightower; Gev Manoukian	Contemporary	"These Arms of Mine"—Otis Redding	
4	8	Courtney Galiano; Mark Kanemura	Jazz	"The Garden"—Mirah	
5	LVW	All Dancers	Jazz	"Great DJ (Calvin Harris Remix)"—The Ting Tings	
5	2	Melissa Sandvig; Ade Obayomi	Jazz	"24 Hours" (The Aston Shuffle A-Bomb Remix)—Terry Poison	
5	4	Kayla Radomski; Kūpono Aweau	Contemporary	"Eyes On Fire"—Blue Foundation	
5	7	Janette Manrara; Evan Kasprzak	Jazz	"Move" (Metronomy Remix)—CSS	
5	8	Top 3 male	Jazz	"True Romance"—She Wants Revenge	
5	8	Top 3 female	Jazz	"Kick It (Stereoheroes Remix)"—Nina Martine	
5	9	Jeanine Mason; Evan Kasprzak	Jazz	"Heartbreaker"—MSTRKRFT featuring John Legend	
5	9	Talia Fowler	Jazz	"Shot You Down"—Audio Bullys	Guest Dancer; Result Show
6	MT20	Mollee Gray; Pauline Mata; Ellenore Scott	Jazz	"On a Cloud"—Platinum Pied Pipers	
6	1	Ellenore Scott; Ryan Di Lello	Contemporary Jazz	"Arcadia"—Apparat	
6	5	Kathryn McCormick; Jonathan "Legacy" Perez	Jazz	"So Deep"—Hot Chip	
6	5	Ashleigh Di Lello; Jakob Karr	Lyrical Jazz	"Time Flies"—Lykke Li	
6	6	Ellenore Scott; Jakob Karr	Contemporary Jazz	"Tore My Heart"—OONA and Dave Tweedie	
6	7	Top 8	Jazz	"Pon de Floor" (Samantha Ronson remix)—Major Lazer feat. Vybz Kartel (Jazz	Result Show
6	8	Ashleigh Di Lello; Russell Ferguson	Lyrical Jazz	"Angel Standing By"—Jewel	
7	MT11	Courtney Galiano; Ashley Galvan; Neil Haskell; Robert Roldan; AdéChiké Torbert	Jazz	"Freak"—Estelle feat. Kardinal Offishall	
7	1	Mark Kanemura; Cristina Santana	Jazz	"Starstruck"—Santigold	
7	1	Allison Holker; Alex Wong	Contemporary	"Hallelujah"—Jeff Buckley	
7	2	Top 10	Jazz	Royal T"—Crookers feat. Róisín Murphy (Jazz	Resul Show
7	3	Courtney Galiano; Robert Roldan	Jazz	"XXXO"—M.I.A.	
7	6	Allison Holker; Jose Ruiz	Contemporary	Eternal Sunshine of the Spotless Mind theme—Jon Brion	
7	6	Kent Boyd; Kathryn McCormick	Jazz	"Tightrope"—Janelle Monáe	
8	MT20	Jordan Casanova; Marko Germar; Missy Morelli; Clarice Ordaz	Jazz	"Vanguardian"—Steed Lord	
8	MT20	Top 10 girls	Jazz	"Pop Drop & Roll"—Chonique Sneed & Lisette Bustamante	
8	1	Caitlynn Lawson; Robert Roldan^{2}	Jazz	"In For the Kill" (Skream's Let's Get Ravey Remix)—La Roux	
8	1	Top 20	Jazz	"XR2"—M.I.A.	Result Show
8	3	Ashley Rich; Chris Koehl	Jazz	"Lights Go Down" (District 78 remix)—Telepathe	
8	3	Ryan Ramirez; Ricky Jaime	Contemporary	"With Every Heartbeat" (Acoustic)—Robyn	
8	6	Allison Holker; Marko Germar	Contemporary	"I Know It's Over"—Jeff Buckley	
8	6	Melanie Moore; Sasha Mallory	Jazz	Game On—District 78	
8	7	Tadd Gadduang; Ellenore Scott	Jazz	"The Gulag Orkestar"—Beirut	
8	7	Marko Germar; Caitlynn Lawson	Lyrical Jazz	"Heavy in Your Arms"—Florence and the Machine	
8	8	Sasha Mallory; Mark Kanemura	Jazz	"Raise Your Weapon"—Deadmau5	
9	LVW	All Dancers	Jazz	"Freak Out (Gold Chains Panique Mix)"—My Brightest Diamond	
9	MT20	Audrey Case; Tiffany Maher; Janelle Issis*	Jazz	"Sail"—Awolnation	
9	MT20	Top 10 guys	Jazz	"Precognition" (Steed Lord Machine Mix)—Steed Lord	
9	1	Tiffany Maher; George Lawrence Jr.	Contemporary	"Turning Page"—Sleeping At Last	
9	2	Amelia Lowe; Will Thomas	Contemporary	"3326"—Ólafur Arnalds	
9	2	Audrey Case; Matthew Kazmierczak	Jazz	"Hear Me Now" (Dri, Lind and Likka Mix)—Steed Lord	
9	6	Allison Holker; Cole Horibe	Contemporary	"Possibly Maybe" (Instrumental)—Björk	
9	6	Lindsay Arnold; Alex Wong	Jazz	"Somebody That I Used to Know"—Gotye feat. Kimbra	
9	7	Top 6	Jazz	"Scream"—Kelis	
9	8	Tiffany Maher; William Wingfield	Jazz	"Time is Now"—Moloko	
9	8	Cyrus "Glitch" Spencer; Chehon Wespi-Tschopp	Jazz	"Fangs" (District 78 remix)—Little Red Lung	
9	9	Tiffany Maher; William Wingfield	Jazz	"Time is Now"—Moloko	
9	9	Cyrus "Glitch" Spencer; Chehon Wespi-Tschopp	Jazz	"Fangs" (District 78 remix)—Little Red Lung	
9	9	Top 20	Contemporary/Hip-hop	"Torn"—Nathan Lanier	Sonya Tayeh; Christopher Scott
10	LVW	All Dancers	Jazz	"Latch"—Disclosure (band)	
10	MT20	Jasmine Mason; Amy Yakima	Jazz	"Enjoy"—Björk	
10	MT20	Top 20	Jazz	"Ghost of Sky" (Epic Dub)—Steed Lord	
10	1	Jasmine Harper; Aaron Turner	Jazz	"Bottom of the River"—Delta Rae	
10	1	Amy Yakima; Du-Shaunt "Fik-Shun" Stegall	Contemporary	"Elsa"—The Valerie Project	
10	3	Top 18	Jazz	"Pretty Face" (Nathan Lanier remix)—Sóley	Christopher Scott; Sonya Tayeh
10	3	Malece Miller; Marko Germar*	Contemporary	"In the Embers"—Sleeping at Last	
10	5	Top 14	Jazz	"Dimman Kryper Sakta In"—District 78	Dmitry Chaplin; Sonya Tayeh
10	5	~~Alexis Juliano~~; Nico Greetham	Contemporary	"Ashes"—The Bengsons	
10	5	Makenzie Dustman; Paul Karmiryan	Jazz	"You'll Find a Way" (Switch & Sinden Remix)—Santigold	
11	LVW	All Dancers	Jazz	"F for You"—Disclosure feat. Mary J. Blige	
11	MT20	Top 20	Jazz	"Stalker Ha"—Kingdom	
11	MT20	Jessica Richens; Ricky Ubeda	Contemporary	"Vow"—Meredith Monk	
11	1	Tanisha Belnap; Rudy Abreu	Jazz	"You Need"—Bengsons	
11	1	Carly Blaney; Serge Onik	Contemporary	"Latch (Acoustic)"—Sam Smith	
11	3	Jacque LeWarne; Zack Everhart Jr.	Jazz	"Back to Black"—Beyoncé feat. André 3000	
11	3	~~Brooklyn Fullmer~~; Casey Askew; Emilio Dosal; Emily James; Serge Onik; Tanisha Belnap; Valerie Rockey; Zack Everhart Jr.	Contemporary	"So Broken" (Live)—Björk	
11	5	Zack Everhart Jr. Amy Yakima	Contemporary	"Europe, After The Rain"—Max Richter	
11	10	Top 10; All-stars	Contemporary/Hip-Hop	"Sweet Disposition"—The Temper Trap	Sonya Tayeh; Christopher Scott
12	TBA	TBA	TBA	TBA	TBA

^2 Due to a shoulder injury, Mitchell Kelly was barred from performing in his routine. He was replaced for the evening by season 7's Robert Roldan and was automatically in danger of going home.

=== Teaching ===
Tayeh is a faculty member at the Edge Performing Arts Center in Los Angeles. She has also taught classes at The Hip Drop Dance Complex, Monsters of Contemporary, Broadway Dance Center, 24 Seven Dance, Hall of Fame Dance Challenge, Loyola Marymount University, NUVO, and Spotlight Dance Works.

== Style and influences ==
Tayeh describes her choreography style as combat jazz because in her words "[i]t’s staccato, aggressive, and engaged, even when it’s slow." SanJose.com characterized it as "fearless, provocative and unique." She has several influences which include two of her former college professors Diane Mancinelli and Erica Wilson-Perkins, Broadway choreographers Twyla Tharp and Bill T. Jones, Mexican artist Frida Kahlo, her favorite choreographer Jiří Kylián, and her family. In addition, she calls competitive hip-hop dancer Salah her "idol" and Icelandic singer Björk her "ultimate hero".

== Awards and recognition ==
In January 2009, Tayeh was named one of Dance magazine's "25 to Watch". In 2010, she was honored by the Detroit Arts Council and she made the December cover of Dance Teacher magazine. At Wayne State University there is a scholarship named after her called the Sonya Tayeh Endowment Fund that is awarded to students who want to pursue a degree in dance.

Award	Year	Category	Work	Result
Primetime Emmy Awards	2013	Outstanding Choreography	"Possibly Maybe", "Turning Page", "Sail"	Nominated
Primetime Emmy Awards	2015	Outstanding Choreography	"Vow", "So Broken", "Europe, After the Rain"	Nominated
Tony Awards	2021	Best Choreography	Moulin Rouge	Won
