= Light a Light =

Light a Light may refer to:

- "Light a Light", a song by Janis Ian on the album Between the Lines (1975)
  - "Light a Light", a cover of the Janis Ian song by Joan Baez on Honest Lullaby (1979)
  - "Light a Light", a cover of the Janis Ian song by Chyi Yu on Stories (1987)
- "Light a Light", a song by Melissa Etheridge on the album A New Thought for Christmas (2008)
- "Light a Light", a song by Jessica Mauboy and Brendon Boney on the soundtrack to Bran Nue Dae (2010)
- "Light a Light", a song by Sons of Bill on the album Love & Logic (2013)
