= Melanie Moore =

American dancer and actress

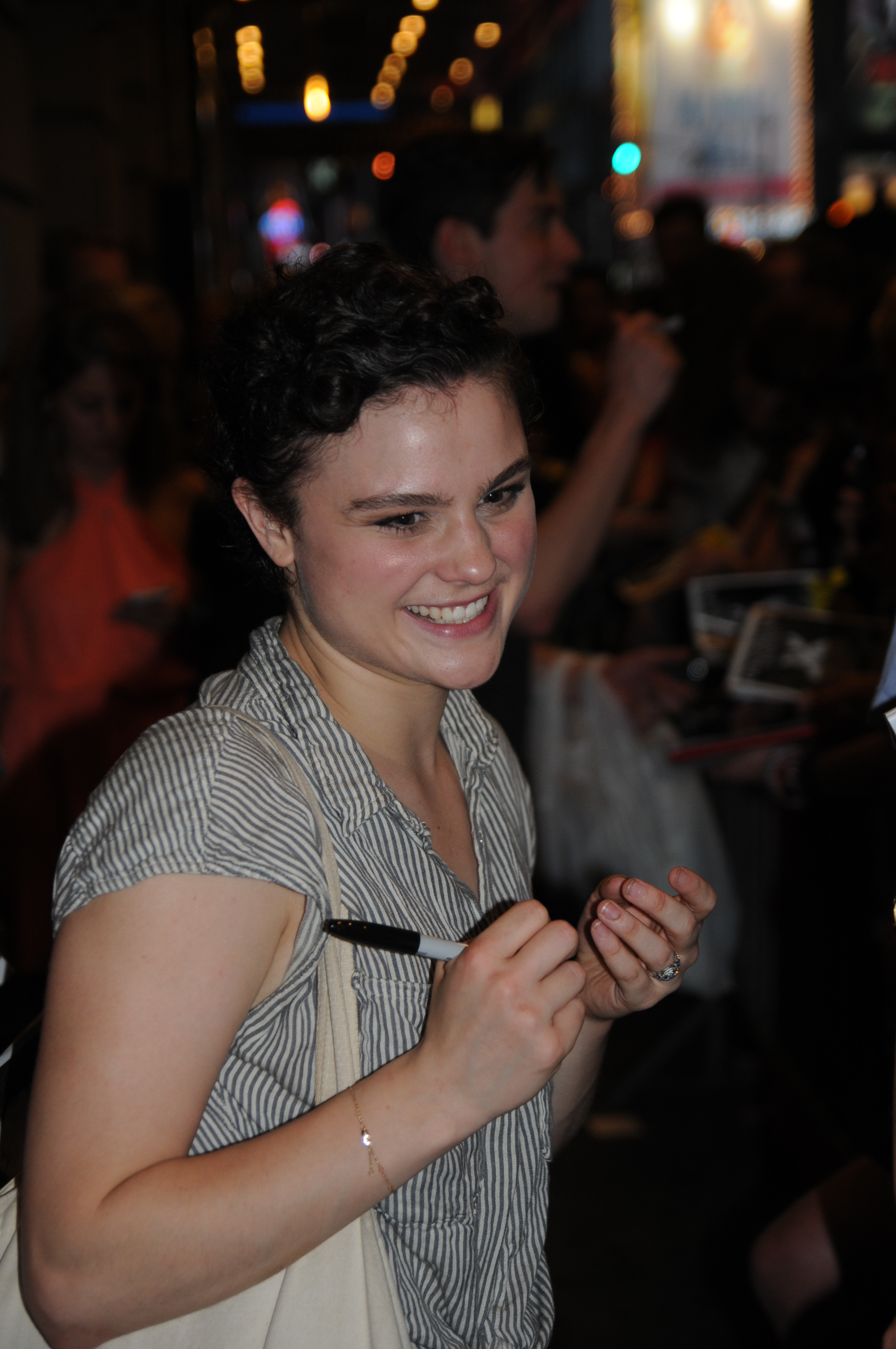
- Moore at the 2015 Broadway production of Finding Neverland
- Born: September 17, 1991 (age 34)
- Occupations: Dancer; actress
- Known for: Winning Season 8 of So You Think You Can Dance

Melanie Moore (born September 17, 1991) is an American professional dancer and actress best known as the winner of the eighth season of the U.S. reality television competition So You Think You Can Dance. According to the results announced on the broadcast, Moore won "overwhelmingly", garnering 47% of the vote in a four-way final tally for 1st place.

== Early life and education ==
Moore was educated in Marietta, Georgia, where she attended Lassiter High School and was crowned homecoming queen. At the time of the SYTYCD competition, she was a 19-year-old college freshman attending Fordham University at Lincoln Center in New York City. Moore trained and competed for twelve years at Centre Stage School of Dance, followed by training and competing at Rhythm Dance Center, both located in Marietta. Moore won the National JUMP Senior Female VIP in 2010.

== Career ==
Moore appeared on the Oxygen TV show All the Right Moves as a member of the Shaping Sound Dance Company. She also appeared on the fourth season of Glee as a dance pupil enrolled at NYADA.

In 2015, Moore originated the role of Peter Pan in Finding Neverland on Broadway at the Lunt-Fontanne Theater, and was nominated for the Fred and Adele Astaire "Best Female Dancer" Award for her work in the role. She played the role of Chava in the 2015 Broadway revival of Fiddler on the Roof until the show closed on December 31, 2016. She appeared in the 2017 Broadway revival of Hello Dolly! as Ermengarde through the end of the show's run in August 2018. In 2022, she joined the touring cast of To Kill a Mockingbird playing Scout Finch opposite Richard Thomas.

In 2026, she originated the role of Nina in the musical adaptation of the film Black Swan at the American Repertory Theater.

Preceded by Lauren Froderman	Winner of So You Think You Can Dance; 2011	Succeeded by Chehon Wespi-Tschopp and Eliana Girard
