= Toni Redpath =

Ballroom dance champion and choreographer

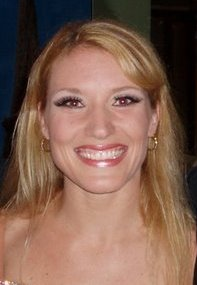
- Toni Redpath (2005)
- Born: October 8, 1972 (age 53); Queensland; Australia
- Occupation: Choreographer
- Spouse: Michael Mead (m. 2000)

Toni Redpath is a professional ballroom dance champion and choreographer.

== Biography ==
Toni Redpath was born in Surfers Paradise, Queensland, Australia, and started ballroom dancing at the age of 9, after accompanying a friend to a local dance competition and deciding that it looked like too much fun not to try.

At 18, Toni represented Norway for three years with then partner Jan Tore Jacobsen before moving to England and passing her Imperial Society Professional Exams with high honors. Toni later joined her family in the United States and began her professional career as an instructor at the Champion Ballroom Academy in San Diego, California.

== Dance career ==
Toni formed a professional partnership with Michael Mead and developed a unique style that ultimately led them to setting a record by winning the Open Championships 4 years in a row (undefeated throughout) before retiring from competition in 2002. On September 28, 2000, Toni and Michael were married on the island of Kauai. Currently the couple are based in San Diego and coach many of the U.S. top competitive couples, as well as judging for competitions and traveling the world doing shows.

=== Related projects ===
Since July 2011, Toni has maintained a YouTube channel and blog where she has provided expert commentary on Dancing with the Stars performances.

In April 2013, Toni launched a wedding dance instructional program on DVD developed for couples preparing for their first dance. The program, called Forget the Feet, consists of 4 DVD discs and a wedding dancing planning guide, according to the official website.

== TV and Film ==
Michael and Toni have made numerous appearances on TV and film. Most notable TV credits are as choreographers on FOX So You Think You Can Dance, featured dancers and champions on PBS America's Ballroom Challenge and Championship Ballroom Dancing, and in the feature film Dance with Me.

=== So You Think You Can Dance ===
Toni and her husband Michael provided smooth ballroom choreography for the first three seasons of So You Think You Can Dance.

In 2010, Toni made her debut as a guest judge on season 7 and supplied choreography for the Las Vegas eliminations.

Season	Dancers	Style	Music
Season 1	Ashlé Dawson; Blake McGrath	Smooth Waltz	Rilassamento—Gianni Pavesi
Season 2	Donyelle Jones; Benji Schwimmer	Viennese Waltz	Have You Ever Really Loved A Woman?—Bryan Adams
Season 2	Martha Nichols; Ivan Koumaev	Waltz	Sandy's Song—Dolly Parton
Season 3	Jamie Goodwin; Hok Konishi	Waltz	Angel—Sarah McLachlan Judge on Ballroom Blitz
Season 3	Jamie Goodwin; Dominic Sandoval	Viennese Waltz	Man of la Mancha—Linda Eder
Season 7	Las Vegas; Group Callbacks	Cha Cha	Just Dance—Lady Gaga
Season 8	Jordan Casanova; Tadd Gadduang	Waltz	"Nocturne"—Secret Garden

== Achievements ==
- Four Time Undefeated U.S. Ballroom Champions: 1999, 2000, 2001, 2002.
- World DanceSport Classic Showdance Champions Finalists.
- National Professional Rising Star Champions: 1998.
- Canadian Open American Ballroom Champions: 2000, 2001.
- National Showdance Championships Runners Up: 2001.

== See also ==
- U.S. National Dancesport Champions (Professional Smooth)
- So You Think You Can Dance (US)
- Michael Mead
- Champion Ballroom Academy
