= Fearless Love =

Album by Melissa Etheridge

Studio album by Melissa Etheridge
- Released: April 27, 2010
- Studio: The Document Room (Malibu, California); Henson Recording Studios (Los Angeles, California)
- Genre: Rock
- Length: 56:31
- Label: Island
- Producer: John Shanks, Melissa Etheridge

Melissa Etheridge chronology
A New Thought for Christmas (2008)	Fearless Love (2010)	4th Street Feeling (2012)

Singles from Fearless Love
- 1. "Fearless Love" Released: 2010

Fearless Love is the eleventh studio album by American singer-songwriter Melissa Etheridge, released by Island Records and Def Jam Music Group on April 27, 2010. Etheridge stated in an interview the album is "about being fearless. It's about choosing love over fear. It's a way, a philosophy of living life that suits me well." The album was recorded at the Document Room in Malibu, and Hensons Studios in Hollywood, CA. It features twelve tracks on the standard release and two bonus tracks on the deluxe edition.

== Production ==
The album was produced by John Shanks, and co-produced by Etheridge. In an interview Etheridge stated about Shanks, she said: "He and I have a great relationship and I knew he could understand my desire to really get back to the rock and roll roots of myself and my music. He certainly did all that and more."

== Reception ==
Professional ratings
Review scores
Source	Rating
AllMusic	2/5 stars
Billboard	(favorable)
The Boston Globe	(average)
The New York Times	(favorable)
NU.nl	(6/10)
PopMatters	5/10 stars
Q	3/5 stars
Rolling Stone	3.5/5 stars

=== Chart history ===
Fearless Love was widely viewed as Etheridge's "return to rock" after a more introspective and blues-influenced album in The Awakening. She embarked on an extensive promotional tour in support of the album, performing the lead single on QVC, Oprah, The Tonight Show with Jay Leno, Dancing with the Stars, The View, Good Morning America, and Ellen.

In its first week on the Billboard 200, Fearless Love debuted at No. 7, selling 46,000 copies. Although the number of albums sold was nearly identical to The Awakening's first week, this album debuted six spots higher on the chart. It was her highest charting debut since Your Little Secret, which debuted at No. 6 in 1995. As of 2012 the album has sold 158,000 copies in United States.

Weekly chart performance for Fearless Love
Chart (2010)	Peak position
Austrian Albums (Ö3 Austria)	26
Canadian Albums (Billboard)	13
Dutch Albums (Album Top 100)	28
Greek Albums (IFPI)	18
Swiss Albums (Schweizer Hitparade)	51
US Billboard 200	7

=== Critical reception ===
Critical reception towards the album was mixed and positive. At Metacritic, which assigns a rating to reviews from mainstream critics, it holds a "mixed or average reviews" score of 59% based on seven reviews.

Rolling Stone gave it 3.5 stars out of 5, calling the album, Melissa's "feistiest disc since her 1988 debut."

The New York Times praised the "broad, bruising rock arrangements."

The Boston Globe also noted that the rock tracks are the ones when Etheridge's "scarred, emotive croon works its visceral voodoo."

AllMusic was less positive, giving the album 2 stars out of 5 and criticizing the "oppressive" production.

NU.nl states that "despite a strong and promising opening, Fearless Love gets trapped halfway in (...) cliché-filled lyrics against a backdrop of insignificant heartland rock and schmalzy power ballads."

== Track listing ==
All songs written by Melissa Etheridge.

1. "Fearless Love" – 4:28
2. "The Wanting of You" – 4:12
3. "Company" – 4:53
4. "Miss California" – 4:00
5. "Drag Me Away" – 4:41
6. "Indiana" – 5:28
7. "Nervous" – 3:12
8. "Heaven on Earth" – 3:47
9. "We Are the Ones" – 5:39
10. "Only Love" – 5:43
11. "To Be Loved" – 5:16
12. "Gently We Row" – 5:11

=== Bonus tracks ===
1. "The Heart of a Woman" – 5:16
2. "Away" – 4:37

== Personnel ==
- Melissa Etheridge – vocals, acoustic guitar, mando-guitar
- John Shanks – acoustic guitar, electric guitar
- Sean Hurley – bass guitar
- Jamie Muhoberac – keyboards
- Charles Judge – additional keyboards and synthesizer (tracks 3–6)
- Joss Stone – backing vocals (track 9)
- Natasha Bedingfield – backing vocals (track 9)
- Victor Indrizzo – drums
- Satnam Ramgotra – tabla (track 9)
- The line "We are the ones we have been waiting for" (track 9) originates from June Jordan's Poem for South African Women. Copyright 2005 June Jordan Literary Estate Trust.
- Engineered and mixed by Jeff Rothschild
