= Liz Lira =

American dancer and choreographer

Liz Lira is a professional salsa dancer and choreographer from Southern California. She has won numerous titles at the World Salsa Championships and other international competitions. Liz is best known for her work as a choreographer on several seasons of So You Think You Can Dance.

== SYTYCD choreography ==
Season	Show	Dancers	Style	Music
Season 7	Week 5	Anya Garnis; AdéChiké Torbert	Salsa	"Oyelo Que Te Conviene"—Eddie Palmieri
Season 8	Week 4	Ashley Rich; Chris Koehl	Salsa	"Mambo Beat"—Tito Puente
Season 9	Week 3	Audrey Case; Matthew Kazmierczak	Salsa	"Cinco Salsa"—Sverre Indris Joner/HSC/Kork
