= Michael Mead =

English ballroom dancer (born 1956)

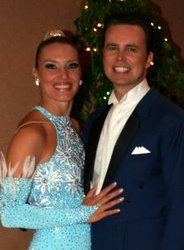
- Michael (right) with Toni Redpath
- Born: 4 June 1956 (age 70); Croydon, England; United Kingdom
- Occupation: Choreographer
- Spouse: Toni Redpath (m. 2000)

Michael Mead (born 4 June 1956) is a professional ballroom dance champion and choreographer.

== Biography ==
Michael Mead, born in Croydon, England, spent his early years traveling with his family and attending schools overseas. At 18, done with school and unsure of what he wished to do professionally, Michael decided to try his hand at accounting. After quickly establishing that perhaps the last thing he wished was to spend the rest of his life auditing, Michael enrolled in a teacher training class at a local dance studio, and was offered a job after only six months of dance training.

The lust for travel instilled in Michael in his early years soon took hold, ultimately leading him to California, where he opened Londance, now one of the top competitive dance studios in the U.S., in Costa Mesa, California. Though Michael sold his ownership share in 1989 in order to concentrate on the serious pursuit of a competitive dance career, he continues to teach there (and at Champion Ballroom Academy in San Diego) to this day.

== Dance career ==
Michael formed a professional partnership with Toni Redpath and developed a unique style that ultimately led them to setting a record by winning the Open Championships 4 years in a row (undefeated throughout) before retiring from competition in 2002. On September 28, 2000, Toni and Michael were married on the island of Kauai. Currently the couple are based in San Diego and coach many of the U.S. top competitive couples, as well as judging for competitions and traveling the world doing shows.

== TV and Film ==
Michael and Toni have made numerous appearances on TV and film. Most notable TV credits are as choreographers on FOX So You Think You Can Dance, featured dancers and champions on PBS America's Ballroom Challenge and Championship Ballroom Dancing, and in the feature film Dance with Me.

=== Choreography for So You Think You Can Dance ===
Season	Dancers	Style	Music
Season 1	Ashlé Dawson; Blake McGrath	Waltz	Rilassamento—Gianni Pavesi
Season 2	Donyelle Jones; Benji Schwimmer	Viennese Waltz	Have You Ever Really Loved A Woman?—Bryan Adams
Season 2	Martha Nichols; Ivan Koumaev	Waltz	Sandy's Song—Dolly Parton
Season 3	Jamie Goodwin; Hok Konishi	Waltz	Angel—Sarah McLachlan
Season 3	Jamie Goodwin; Dominic Sandoval	Viennese Waltz	Man of la Mancha—Linda Eder

== Achievements ==
- Four Time Undefeated U.S. Ballroom Champions: 1999, 2000, 2001, 2002
- World DanceSport Classic Showdance Champions Finalists
- National Professional Rising Star Champions: 1998
- Canadian Open American Ballroom Champions: 2000, 2001
- National Showdance Championships Runners Up: 2001

== See also ==
- U.S. National Dancesport Champions (Professional Smooth)
- So You Think You Can Dance (US)
- Toni Redpath
