= Fearless Love (song) =

Single by Melissa Etheridge

from the album Fearless Love
- Released: 2010
- Genre: Rock
- Length: 4:13
- Label: Island
- Songwriter(s): Melissa Etheridge
- Producer(s): John Shanks; Jeremy Sullivan; Melissa Etheridge

Melissa Etheridge singles chronology
| "Message to Myself" (2007) | "Fearless Love" (2010) | "Falling Up" (2012) |

"Fearless Love" is a song by Melissa Etheridge and the first single of her 2010 album Fearless Love.

== Background ==
Etheridge wrote the song after her young daughter suggested the title for her album. Etheridge explained to Spinner the inspiration for the lyric "I was 17, you kissed my lips":

"It was the first time I kissed a girl. I try to put my own experiences in my songs, of course, and yet have them remain universal. It was intense going through that experience and having the fireworks go off: 'Oh my God, this is greatest thing ever! This is what all my girlfriends have been talking about when they kiss boys' and stuff. I was like, 'Hmmm I don't feel that' and then all of a sudden I felt it and I had to keep it in to myself. It will eat you up. It's horrible to have to put a lid on something."

== Music video ==
The video for "Fearless Love" features actress Willa Holland and was directed by Jay Martin.

== Charts ==
| Chart (2010) | Peak position |
|---|---|
| U.S. Billboard Hot Adult Contemporary | 18 |
| US Adult Alternative Songs (Billboard) | 10 |
