= Message to Myself =

2007 single by Melissa Etheridge

Single by Melissa Etheridge

from the album The Awakening
- Released: 2007
- Recorded: Document Room, Malibu
- Genre: Rock
- Length: 3:26
- Label: Island
- Songwriter(s): Melissa Etheridge
- Producer(s): Melissa Etheridge, David N. Cole

Melissa Etheridge singles chronology
"I Need to Wake Up" (2006)	"Message to Myself" (2007)	"Just Stand Up!" (2008)

"Message to Myself" is a song by Melissa Etheridge and the first single of her album The Awakening released in 2007.

== Song information ==
The song was written by the singer and is about how she writes songs to remind herself that she is fine when she is depressed – she discovers the good things in her life again when she hears these songs in the radio. The line "I've warned myself of the blackness in my chest" is a reference to the time when she was suffering from breast cancer, which was her inspiration for the whole album. The warning she mentions took place in one of her most famous songs, "Come to My Window", where the lyrics contain the lines "Nothing fills the blackness that has seeped into my chest". The chorus ("I'm sending out a message to myself, so that when I hear it on the radio...") is reflected at the beginning of the song which is recorded in lower quality to give the impression that you hear it on the radio or through an old gramophone. It is also the second Melissa Etheridge song to contain some nonsense lines ("...sha la la la...") -, the first being "Come On out Tonight", from Lucky. Those are supposed to show that the message the singer is sending herself is not based on the lyrics of her songs but mainly on the music itself ("...it works that way too..."). The song ends with the sound of a pounding telecaster, a reference to the messaging system Morse Code.

Musically, the song is an up-tempo rock song that rides on a pop hook which has been described as "one of the most buoyant sing-along she's ever led". In the chorus there is an acoustic guitar loop in a typical country style.

== Track listing ==
All songs written by Melissa Etheridge.

1. "Message to Myself" – 3:26
2. "I Need to Wake Up" – 3:33

== Music video ==
Etheridge and Michaels in the music video.

The video, directed by Danny Clinch, shows Melissa in a white room with her band singing along to the song which is played on an old gramophone. She is writing her message ("I'm loved") on a wall of glass until her band joins her writing various catchphrases ("simple truth", "I am almost free", "All is love", "I found my sound") on the walls until the formerly white room turns all colorful. Her spouse at the time Tammy Lynn Michaels and the couple's baby twins appear in the video too as well as other people who mean a lot to her enter the room which shows the positive and optimistic character of the lyrics and how life gets better step by step listening to the music. Already at the beginning of the video snippets of the end of the video are shown when the room is crowded which is supposed to reflect the positive look in the future as soon as she can listen to her own song.

== Cover artwork ==
The single cover of the US release looks like an abstract painting but is in fact a tinted mammography image. This has also been used for the album cover where the image pretends to show the waves of the ocean at first sight.

== Credits and personnel ==
- Vocals and acoustic guitar by Melissa Etheridge
- Recorded and mixed by David N. Cole
- Assistant engineering by Jorge Costa and Jared Kvitka
- Mastered by Brian

=== Weekly charts ===
Chart (2007)	Peak position
Germany (GfK)	52
US Adult Contemporary (Billboard)	25
