= A New Thought for Christmas =

Album by Melissa Etheridge

Studio album by Melissa Etheridge
- Released: September 30, 2008
- Recorded: NRG Studios, North Hollywood, California
- Genre: Christmas music, rock
- Length: 44:10
- Label: Island
- Producer: Melissa Etheridge, David N. Cole

Melissa Etheridge chronology
The Awakening (2007)	A New Thought for Christmas (2008)	Fearless Love (2010)

A New Thought for Christmas is the tenth studio album, and first Christmas album, by American singer-songwriter Melissa Etheridge, released by Island Records on September 30, 2008.

Professional ratings
Review scores
Source	Rating
AllMusic	3/5 stars

== Track listing ==
All songs written by Melissa Etheridge, except where noted.

No.	Title	Writer(s)	Length
1.	"Blue Christmas"	Billy Hayes, Jay W. Johnson	2:44
2.	"Glorious"		3:38
3.	"Christmas (Baby Please Come Home)"	Jeff Barry, Ellie Greenwich, Phil Spector	2:41
4.	"Have Yourself a Merry Little Christmas"	Hugh Martin, Ralph Blane	4:22
5.	"Ring the Bells"	Salman Ahmad, Melissa Etheridge	6:05
6.	"Merry Christmas Baby"	Lou Baxter, Johnny Moore	3:46
7.	"Christmas in America"		4:20
8.	"Light a Light"		5:10
9.	"It's Christmas Time"		4:21
10.	"O Night Divine"		6:57

In the album's liner notes, Etheridge states that although she has never been a religious person, Christmas has always been one of her favorite times of year. She states that the album is her attempt "to bridge our old oppressive cultural ways with the enlightenment of our coming future." The album contains a mix of traditional Christmas songs and original compositions.

== 2009 re-release deluxe edition DVD track list ==
On October 26, 2009, Etheridge re-released A New Thought for Christmas as a deluxe package with a concert film DVD produced by Barry Summers from World Live Shows/Rock Fuel Media from the House Of Blues in Atlantic City. The Concert TV Special is broadcast throughout the month of December each year on HDNET/AXIS TV

1. "Christmas (Baby Please Come Home)"
2. "Blue Christmas"
3. "Glorious"
4. "Have Yourself a Merry Little Christmas"
5. "Christmas in America"
6. "Merry Christmas Baby"
7. "Light a Light"
8. "Ring the Bells"
9. "It's Christmas Time"
10. "O Night Devine"

== Personnel ==
- Melissa Etheridge – lead vocals, acoustic guitar, electric rhythm guitar
- Salmand Ahmad – guitar, vocals
- Mark Browne – bass, guitar
- Bernie Barlow – vocals
- Lily Wilson Browne – vocals
- Fritz Lewak – drums, percussion
- Philip Sayce – guitar, vocals
- Paul Trudeau – keyboards, vocals

== Charts ==
Chart (2008)	Peak position
US Billboard 200	113
US Top Holiday Albums (Billboard)	4
