= Lauren Froderman =

American contemporary dancer

- Other names: LoFro, Frodie, Lo
- Education: Loyola Marymount University
- Occupation: Dancer
- Known for: So You Think You Can Dance

Lauren Rose Froderman is an American contemporary dancer. She is most known for being the winner of the 7th season of So You Think You Can Dance.

== Early life and education ==
She grew up in Glendale, Arizona and graduated from Greenway High School in 2010. While in high school she was a part of both the cheer and dance team. She began dancing at the age of three. She has trained in jazz, lyrical, contemporary, ballet, tap, and hip-hop. She trained under the direction of Donald Dadey, who now owns the Scottsdale School of Ballet. She graduated from Loyola Marymount University in California in 2015 and is part of the California Nu chapter of Pi Beta Phi there. Froderman has stated that she has been influenced by Mikhail Baryshnikov and Michael Jackson.

== Career ==
Froderman began her professional career when she was 10 years old and performed with the Phoenix Rockettes. She has also danced for the Radio City Rockettes, Big Time Rush, Blake McGrath, and others. She has also performed in multiple television performances, music videos, and live shows. Some of the shows she has appeared on include AFTER Episode I: Lucy (VR Experience) (2017), How to Get the Girl (2019) and Collide in 1986 (2015). She also appeared on Live with Regis and Kelly in 2010. The show she gained recognition on was the seventh season of So You Think You Can Dance. She is also the first dance athlete for Gatorade and being the female dance athlete for the G Series Fit line.

== So You Think You Can Dance and life after the show ==
In 2011 Froderman who was 18 years old at the time, auditioned and made it onto the seventh season of the popular Fox show So You Think You Can Dance. She is known for making it to the top 11 of the season. She auditioned for the show on a whim after having friends and family convince her. After making it through each of the weeks, she made it to the top three with fellow dancers Robert Roldan who placed third, and Kent Boyd who placed as the runner-up. With winning the show Froderman got to be featured in and on the cover of Dance Spirit Magazine, take home $250,000, get to be the first dancer to be a Gatorade Athlete, and go on tour with some of the cast from season 7. After the show, she went and got her degree at Loyola Marymount University. She still continues to dance and produce her own choreography. Froderman is also a faculty member of the traveling dance convention Excel in Motion. She posts her work through her YouTube channel. She also experiments with daily vlogging to share with her fans. Knowing that she can not dance forever, she hopes to one day teach middle school English.

Performances on So You Think You Can Dance season 7

Week	Dancers	Style	Music	Choreographer(s)	Results
1	Lauren Froderman & Ade Obayomi	Pop-Jazz	"Oh Yeah"—Yello	Mandy Moore	Safe
2	Lauren Froderman & Dominic Sandoval	Lyrical hip-hop	"If I Were a Boy"—Beyoncé Knowles	Tessandra Chavez	Safe
3	Lauren Froderman & Neil Haskell	Broadway	"Let Me Entertain You"—Debbie Gibson	Joey Dowling	Safe
4	Lauren Froderman & Pasha Kovalev	Cha-cha-cha	"Telephone"—Lady Gaga and Beyoncé Knowles	Jean-Marc Généreux France Mousseau	Safe
5	Lauren Froderman & Mark Kanemura	Tahitian	"Jungle"—Last Voices	Tiana Liufau	Safe
6	Lauren Froderman & Stephen "Twitch" Boss	Hip-hop	"My Chick Bad"—Ludacris ft. Nicki Minaj	Napoleon and Tabitha D'umo	Safe
7	Lauren Froderman & Allison Holker	Broadway	"Who's Got the Pain?" from Damn Yankees	Tyce Diorio	Bottom 3
8	Lauren Froderman & Pasha Kovalev	Argentine Tango	"Oblivion"—Ástor Piazzolla	Miriam Larici Leonardo Barrionuevo	Safe
9	Lauren Froderman & Stephen "Twitch" Boss	Hip-hop	"Power"—Kanye West	Napoleon and Tabitha D'umo	Safe

- Solos:

Week	Style	Music	Result
3	Contemporary	"Unchained Melody"—Cyndi Lauper	Safe
6	Contemporary	"The Waves"—Elisa	Safe
7	Contemporary	"(You Make Me Feel Like) A Natural Woman"—Aretha Franklin	Bottom 3
9(Top Three Solo)	Contemporary	"I'm Going Down"—Mary J. Blige	Winner

Preceded by Russell Ferguson	Winner of So You Think You Can Dance; 2010	Succeeded by Melanie Moore
