= Malika Ferguson =

English singer-songwriter

- Also known as: Meleka, Malika
- Born: Malika Ferguson; London, England
- Genres: Soul, R&B, dance
- Years active: 2000s–present
- Website: Website

Malika Ferguson, known professionally as Malika and formerly as Meleka, is a British singer-songwriter from London. She is known for the 2009 funky single "Go (Now It's Over Boy)", whose Crazy Cousinz remix reached the BBC 1Xtra A List and was named Urban Record of the Month by Mixmag. Malika provided lead vocals on Nathan Dawe's 2019 cover of "Flowers", for which she was uncredited on the original release. the single peaked at number 12 on the UK Singles Chart in 2020 and was certified platinum by the BPI. Dawe's 2018 debut single "Cheatin'", which also features Malika, was certified platinum by the BPI in May 2025. In 2017, she received a grant from the PRS Foundation Momentum Fund.

== Biography ==
Malika grew up in the Northwest London. In interviews, she has described winning her first singing competition at the age of five, performing "Weak" by SWV. Her father ran a pirate radio station called Time Radio in North West London and worked as a music manager during the 1980s and early 1990s. Her aunt, Sonia Ferguson, recorded a UK Lovers Rock version of Smokey Robinson's "Ooh Baby Baby", which Malika has cited as an early musical influence. Her stated musical influences include Mary J. Blige, Whitney Houston, Brandy, Stevie Wonder, Alicia Keys, the Spice Girls, Christina Aguilera, the Sugababes, and SWV.

== Career ==
Malika began her professional music career around 2006 under the stage name Meleka. Working with vocal producer Shaun "Hypertone" Barrett and songwriter Zeus "Mr Starz Up" Charalambous, she wrote and recorded "Go (Now It's Over Boy)".

In 2008, Malika won the MTV Base talent competition Hugo Urban Rules, whose judges included Grammy Award-winning singer Estelle and Sabrina Washington, formerly of Mis-Teeq. As her prize, she licensed "Go" to Xtaster Records, which released it as her debut single in September 2009. The Crazy Cousinz remix reached the BBC 1Xtra A List and received airplay on Kiss FM, Choice FM, and the Galaxy Network; it was named Urban Record of the Month by Mixmag.

In 2009, Malika appeared on "Scars", a track from the Basement Jaxx album of the same name, also featuring American singer Kelis and rapper Chipmunk (now known as Chip), released through XL Recordings.

2010–2016: Independent releases and features

Following the release of "Go", Malika released "Miss Me", also produced by Crazy Cousinz, through her independent label Malika Music Ltd. In the early 2010s, she formed a short-lived collective called P45 alongside producer TS7, Maxwell D of Pay As You Go Cartel, and Piers Aggett of Rudimental.

In 2014, Malika signed a publishing deal with Ultra Records.

Malika released her debut solo EP, Songs About C, in October 2017, preceded by lead singles including "Put It On Me" and "Run". Around the same time, Snakehips featured her on "Falling", from their 2016 All My Friends EP. Speaking to The FADER, Snakehips said of the collaboration: "With 'Falling,' we felt like making a more classic-sounding soul and R&B record...and Malika's voice worked so good with the vibe."

2017–2020: PRS Foundation Momentum Fund and Tension EP

In 2017, Malika received a grant from the PRS Foundation Momentum Fund, which she used to fund promotional activities for Songs About C, including live sessions with Mahogany, Red Bull, and BBC Introducing, and to record her second EP.

Malika second EP, Tension, was released in September 2020. Voice Online described it as "the UK artist's coming of age". An acoustic reworking, Tension (Acoustic), followed in November 2020.

In 2018, Malika featured on "Cheatin'", the debut single by DJ and producer Nathan Dawe, which was certified platinum by the BPI in May 2025. In October 2019, Dawe released a cover of "Flowers" originally recorded by Sweet Female Attitude in 2000, featuring rapper Jaykae; Malika provided lead vocals on the track but was not credited on the original release. The single reached number 12 on the UK Singles Chart in 2020 and was certified platinum by the BPI.

2022: Bless Her Soul

In August 2022, Malika released the single "Bless Her Soul", co-written with Zeus Charalambous and Ian Henry and produced by Piers Aggett and Shaun Barrett.Wonderland Magazine premiered the accompanying music video, while The Pit London described the single as "a monumental addition to Malika's already formidable discography". An acoustic version followed in December 2022.

Music Consultancy

Malika is the founder of Sounds Write, a music consultancy based in London. She has also served as a trustee of Grounded Sounds, a music charity that offered workshops for aspiring music industry professionals.
