= Steed Lord =

Icelandic electronic house group

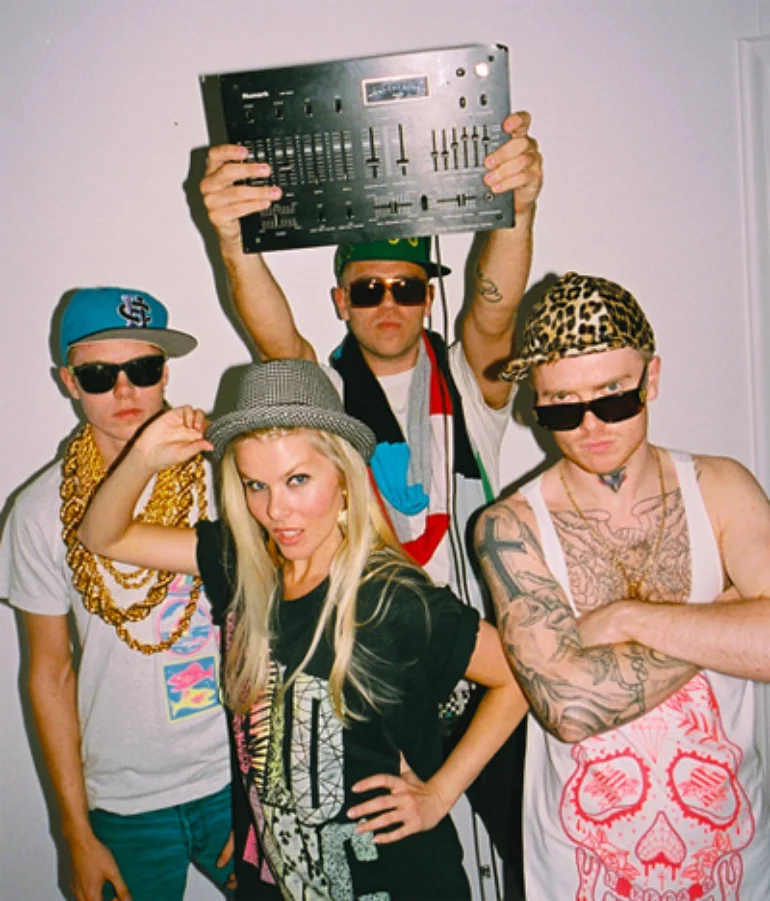

Background information
- Origin: Reykjavík, Iceland
- Genre: Electronic House
- Years active: 2006 - 2013
- Label: Self-distributed
- Members: Mega; Demo; Kali; AC Bananas
- Website: www.SteedLord.com

Steed Lord was an Icelandic electronic house group from Reykjavík, Iceland. The group was made up of four members, Kali, MEGA, Demo and AC Bananas.

== Music career ==
=== Touring ===
Starting in 2006, they played shows in their native Reykjavík, and soon after they were being booked to perform over Europe and North America. They have played in Portugal, France, Italy, Germany, the Netherlands, Norway, Denmark, Sweden, and the United Kingdom. During their tour of North America, they performed live with artists such as Chromeo, Girl Talk, Vampire Weekend, Klever, and Does It Offend You, Yeah?. In the fall of 2009, Steed Lord was asked to open for Peaches for a run of dates in Southern California. Additionally, they have performed at festivals including Winter Music Conference in Miami, Electronic Betas Festival in Austria and South By Southwest in Austin, Texas.

=== 2008 car accident ===
On April 9, 2008, Steed Lord was involved in a near-fatal car accident on their way to the Keflavik International Airport as they were about to depart for a tour of Norway and Sweden. Their car collided head-on with another car coming from the opposite direction on a narrow and icy road. The band was taken to the hospital and placed in the intensive care unit. Mega suffered life-threatening internal injuries and had to undergo multiple surgeries to recover and Demo had to undergo surgery for internal bleeding. By the end of July 2008, still not entirely recovered from the accident, the band set out on their first proper tour.

=== Current status ===
In 2009, the band moved from Iceland to Los Angeles, however, most of them have since moved back to Iceland and they are currently focusing on individual projects.

== Clothing line ==
In 2007, Steed Lord was commissioned by Sweden-based retail giant H&M to design a line for their Divided label. The Steed Lord / H&M designs were available in more than 50 countries. Additionally, Steed Lord is part of WeSC's “We Activist” program, and is featured in the print and video campaigns for the Swedish streetwear brand.

== Discography ==
Albums

- 2008: Truth Serum
- 2009: The Truth Serum Remix Project
- 2010: Heart II Heart
- 2012: The Prophecy pt. 1

Mixtapes

- 2008: Beats & Blues: Live From The Big Apple
- 2008: Mixmag's Ed Banger Menage-A-Trois

EPs

- 2012: Precognition EP
