= Kris Lythgoe =

American writer and producer

- Born: 10 May 1979 (age 47); Enfield, England
- Occupations: Television and Theatrical Producer
- Spouse: Becky Baeling (m. 2013)
- Children: 2
- Parent(s): Bonnie Lythgoe (mother); Nigel Lythgoe (father)
- Family: Simon Lythgoe (brother)
- Website: www.lythgoefamily.com

Kristopher Michael Lythgoe (born 10 May 1979) is an English–American television and theatre writer/producer known for creating and producing reality television shows such as Who Are You? and So You Think You Can Dance. Lythgoe has also created several American pantomimes live stage productions based upon fairy-tales and folk tales with a modern twist.

== Theatre career ==
Lythgoe has written several pantomimes based upon fairy tales and folk tales. He has also produced several musicals in the United Kingdom, including Footloose and The Wedding Singer.

=== Pantomime ===
- A Cinderella Christmas (2010, 2011)
- A Snow White Christmas (2012)
- Aladdin and his Winter Wish (2013)
- Sleeping Beauty and her Winter Knight (2014)
- Peter Pan and Tinkerbell: A Pirate’s Christmas (2016)
- Beauty and the Beast: A Christmas Rose (2017)
- The Wonderful Winter of Oz (2018)
- Princess and Pirates Sing Along
- Rapunzel and Her Holiday Wish (2024)
- Robin Hood and His Merry Christmas Men (2025)

== Filmography ==
=== As producer ===
- Corkscrewed: The Wrath of Grapes (2006)
- So You Think You Can Dance (2008 - 2009, 11 episodes)
- So You Think You Can Dance Canada (2008, premiere episode only)
- Who Are You? (2009)
- Opening Night (2012, also as writer)
- My Beautiful Game (2013, also as writer)

== Awards and honors ==
- Great American Award, The All-American Boys Chorus, 2018
