= Becky Baeling =

American singer and actress (born 1977)

Becky Baeling Lythgoe
- Born: Rebecca Diane Bahling; May 1, 1977 (age 49); Rochester Hills, Michigan, US
- Origin: New York City, US
- Genres: Dance; pop
- Occupations: Singer; actress; producer; TV host
- Label: Universal
- Website: beckybaeling.com

Becky Baeling Lythgoe (born May 1, 1977) is an American singer, actress, producer, and television host.

== Early life and family ==
Baeling was born in Rochester Hills, Michigan, as Rebecca Diane Bahling, the daughter of Wanda (née Vincent) (November 10, 1945 – May 18, 2013) and Garry Bahling, a Brigadier General F-16 fighter pilot in the Air National Guard and an expert witness in accident reconstruction. She has one older brother, Ronald Bahling. She is of Norwegian and Scottish descent. Later in life while recording her debut album, she changed one letter of her last name (the "h" to an "e") to Baeling, so that her surname would be pronounced correctly. She began taking dance lessons at the age of 6 at the Rochester School of Ballet and by the age of 12 was performing in various local and regional theaters including Stanley Hollingsworth's opera "The Selfish Giant" at Meadowbrook Theatre and singing and narrating the Detroit Symphony Orchestra at Orchestra Hall in Detroit. In high school, she was part of the National Honors Society and was named "best actress" and "class clown" by her peers. Upon graduation, she went on to attend the University of Michigan School of Music, Theatre & Dance and graduated with a BFA in musical theatre performance. During this time, she spent a summer singing in Chicago and a semester abroad studying drama more intensely at the Royal Academy of Dramatic Arts in London, England.

Baeling married her producing partner, theatre and TV producer Kris Lythgoe, on April 27, 2013, in a themed mystery wedding.

== Career ==
=== Music ===
After graduating from university, she moved to New York City and made money singing in jazz clubs, performing in regional theaters, and singing jingles for "Gatorade", "Slim Fast" and "Coca-Cola" to name a few. Soon after she was offered a demo deal from Epic Records to do a solo album and then later signed to Universal Records under Monte Lipman and Doug Morris. She began having success on Billboard's Hot Dance Club Play chart with her debut album, Becstasy, which was released on Universal Records in 2003. Baeling served as co- executive producer on the album, along with A&R man Lee Chesnut. Her most successful single to date has been "Getaway", which hit No. 1 on the U.S. billboard dance chart (produced by DJ Tony Moran), followed by "If You Love Me" which hit No. 3 on the U.S. Billboard dance chart (produced by Anders Bagge). By year end she was named No. 6 Dance Artist of the Year by Billboard Magazine and her single "If You Love Me" was No. 11 on Billboard's Hot Dance Club Play Singles of the year. In 2004, Baeling's song "Without Love", was covered by Ho Yeow Sun and hit No. 1 on the Billboard dance chart as well. Her movie soundtrack debut, "I'm Gonna Fly", was featured in The Guru starring Heather Graham and Marisa Tomei. Her cover of "Heaven Is a Place on Earth" is featured in the film Sleepover. During her years with Universal, she was managed by Larry Rudolph (known best for handling Britney Spears career).

She won the Best New Artist category at the 2004 International Dance Music Awards held in Miami, Florida.

Her television debut occurred in 2003, performing "Saturday in the Park" duet with Brian McKnight on Fox.

She also sang the song "My Grave", which was featured in the video game Dead or Alive 4.

She sang the National Anthem at a NASCAR NEXTEL Cup Race.

It is rumored that she has recorded dance remixes of some old Cy Coleman tunes and that she is working on another album.

=== TV presenting ===
She is also a television host/music journalist, serving as co-host alongside Kyle Martino for Fox TV's Stars in Danger: The High Dive based on the long-running German format Stars in Danger.

From 2006 to 2008, she could be seen on virtually continuous rotation on DirecTV's The 101 program, CD:USA, sister program to the popular CD:UK series. On this show she interviewed musicians including Jamie Foxx, Kelly Clarkson, Clive Davis Rihanna, Jonas Brothers and The Goo Goo Dolls.

She served as a host for The Mobile Fix on Sprint TV.

She hosted and produced Star! Weekly, a weekly entertainment news magazine show in Scandinavia for the E! Network, and was a guest commentator for BBC3's "The Most Annoying......" series for many years, and for several other commentary based programs for Elisabeth Murdoch's company Shine Ltd.

In 2008, she became the entertainment and celebrity correspondent for Discovery Planet Green's "G Word" program. During the first season, her segments included interviews with Trudie Styler about her and Sting's work with the Rainforest Foundation Fund, Robert F. Kennedy, Jr. and his work at Green Chimneys and NFL players from the Philadelphia Eagles among others.

=== Television acting ===
After completing a US club tour for Universal Records, she moved to Los Angeles, California and has had guest-starring roles on several television shows including All of Us on CW, House on Fox and How I Met Your Mother on CBS.

=== Producer ===
During her career as a television host, she began producing shows for Discovery Channel and Star! Weekly. She is EVP for Magic Pictures International producing television series including A Snow White Christmas: Opening Night for Ovation, and My Beautiful Game for Fox Sports/Fox Soccer and is a lead producer for Lythgoe Family Productions, bringing British Panto's to the American stage at its inception along with her husband Kris Lythgoe. Shows include thus far several productions of the following: "A Cinderella’s Christmas" with Lauren Taylor, Fred Willard, Morgan Fairchild, Veronica Dunne, Freddie Stroma, Alex Newell and Broadway's Shoshana Bean; A Snow White Christmas with Ariana Grande, Erich Bergen, Curt Hansen and Neil Patrick Harris; "Aladdin’s Winter Wish" with Ben Vereen, Jordan Fisher, Richard Karn and Bruce Vilanch, "Sleeping Beauty’s Winter Knight" with Olivia Holt, Lucy Lawless and Garrett Clayton; and "Peter Pan and Tinkerbell" starring Sabrina Carpenter, John O'Hurley, and Chrissie Fit.

== Discography ==
=== Albums ===
- Becstacy (2003)
- The Guru soundtrack (2003), "I'm Gonna Fly"
- Sleepover soundtrack (2004), "Heaven Is a Place on Earth"
- "Ultra Dance 04" (2004), "Getaway"
- "Maze:Miami Beach" (2004), "If You Love Me"
- "Dance Diva's II" (2004), "Getaway"

=== Singles ===
- If You Love Me, #3 on Billboard Dance Chart
- Getaway, #1 on Billboard Dance Chart
- Heaven Is a Place on Earth
- Without Love covered by SUN, No. 1 on Billboard Dance Chart
- Diva

== See also ==
- List of Number 1 Dance Hits (United States)
- List of artists who reached number one on the US Dance chart

=== Awards and honors ===
- Great American Award, The All-American Boys Chorus, 2018
