= Pantomime (disambiguation) =

Pantomime is a type of musical comedy stage production, developed in England and designed for family entertainment, mostly performed during Christmas and New Year season.

Pantomime may also refer to:

- Acting or performance such as that performed by a mime artist, using silent gestures
- American pantomime, a North American variant of the English theatrical genre
- Charades, a party game sometimes called "pantomime"
- Pantomime (The Pillows EP), by The Pillows (also the title of its first track)
- Pantomime (Polara EP), by Polara (also the title of its first track)
- "Pantomime", a song by Incubus from the album Alive at Red Rocks
- "Pantomime", a song by Imagine Dragons from the EP It's Time
- "Pantomime", a song by Orgy from the album Candyass
- Pantomime (novel), a 2013 novel by Laura Lam
- "Pantomime" (Penny Crayon), a 1989 television episode

== See also ==
- Panto (disambiguation)
- Mime (disambiguation)
- Dumbshow
- Phantomime
