= Panto =

Panto may refer to:

- Pantomime, a genre of musical comedy stage production developed in England and mostly performed during the Christmas and New Year season
- American pantomime, theatre entertainment in North America derived from the English entertainment genre of pantomime
- Panto (surname)
- Pantograph (rail), an overhead current collector for a tram or electric train
- Pantoprazole, a proton pump inhibitor
- Panto!, a 2012 ITV Christmas special
- "Panto" (Balamory), a 2002 television episode
- "Panto" (Not Going Out), a 2021 television episode

== See also ==
- Big Brother Panto, a 2004–2005 series of the UK TV show Big Brother
- ITV Panto, a series of pantomimes originally broadcast on ITV in 1998, 2000, and 2002
- Pantos (disambiguation)
