= Allison Holker =

American dancer (born 1988)

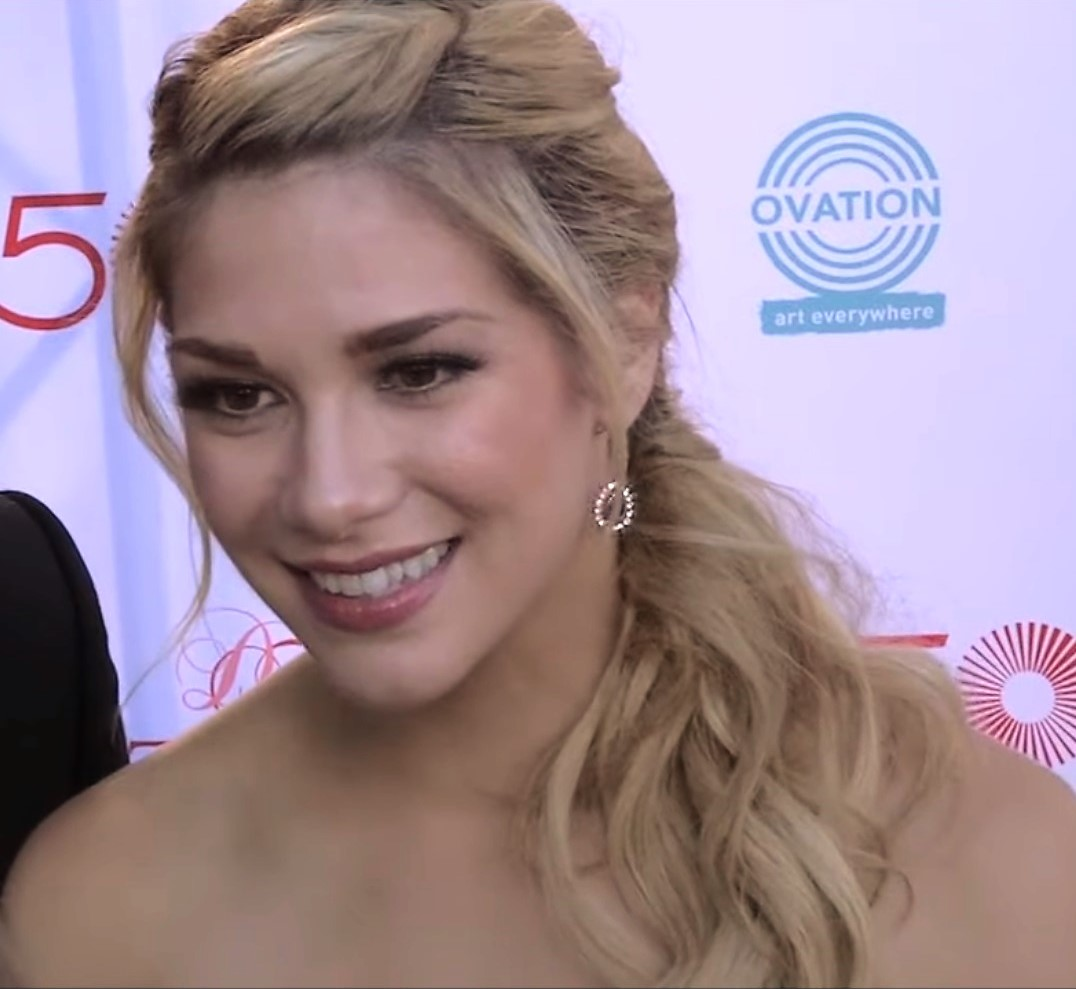
- Holker in 2014
- Born: Allison Renae Holker; February 6, 1988 (age 38); Anoka County, Minnesota, U.S.
- Education: Timpanogos High School
- Occupation: Dancer
- Years active: 2002–present
- Television: So You Think You Can Dance; Dancing with the Stars
- Spouse: Stephen "tWitch" Boss (m. 2013; died 2022)
- Partner(s): Adam Edmunds (2024–present; engaged)
- Children: 3

Allison Renae Holker (born February 6, 1988) is an American dancer. Holker has worked in film, television, and concert tours. She is known for appearances on the television dance competition So You Think You Can Dance, where she was a contestant in season 2 and as an All-Star in seasons 7–11 and 14.

== Early life and education ==
Holker was born in Anoka County, Minnesota, grew up in Orem, Utah, and graduated from Timpanogos High School in June 2006. She began her dance training at the age of nine when she enrolled as a student at The Dance Club in Orem. While she was in Orem she began to specialize in contemporary, tap, ballet, and jazz. She performed in the opening and closing ceremonies of the 2002 Winter Olympics. She has won dance titles including her first national competition in Co DANCE in 2004 and as the National Senior Outstanding Dancer at the New York City Dance Alliance in 2005.

== Career ==
Holker performed with Earth, Wind and Fire at the opening and closing ceremonies at the Olympic Games in 2002, and in the Disney Channel original films High School Musical (2006) and High School Musical 2 (2007). On television, she has been seen in various commercials and was a contestant on the second season of So You Think You Can Dance was in gender the overall quarter-finalist eliminated and as the seventh female contestant, and danced in that season's SYTYCD nationwide tour. She performed with a show called Ballroom with a Twist, choreographed by Louis Van Amstel, and appeared with American Idol's Clay Aiken in his PBS special Tried and True.

Holker was featured in the "Jar of Hearts" music video by Christina Perri. In September/October 2011 Holker was one of Demi Lovato's backup-dancers. Holker has taught at different dance conventions and workshops across the country, also branching out into choreography. Holker was a backup-dancer on The X Factor USA working together with Brian Friedman. On April 30, 2013, she performed a dance routine on Dancing with the Stars with Stephen "tWitch" Boss. They danced to "Crystallize" which was performed live by Lindsey Stirling.

== Dancing with the Stars ==
In August 2014, Holker was announced as one of the 12 professional dancers on the 19th season of Dancing with the Stars. The announcement of Holker, a contemporary dancer, as a cast member was met with controversy due to her limited experience with dancing and teaching Latin Ballroom dance. She partnered with Mean Girls actor Jonathan Bennett. The couple was eliminated on Week 6, finishing in 9th place. On February 11, 2015, Holker was partnered with R5 singer and actor Riker Lynch in the show's 20th season. The couple made it to the finals and finished in second place. For season 21 she was paired with singer Andy Grammer. They were eliminated on Week 8 finishing in 7th place. She did not appear in season 22 due to pregnancy. Holker returned for season 23 and was partnered with singer-songwriter Kenneth "Babyface" Edmonds. The couple were eliminated on Week 4 and finished in 11th place.

| Season | Partner | Place |
|---|---|---|
| 19 | Jonathan Bennett | 9th |
| 20 | Riker Lynch | 2nd |
| 21 | Andy Grammer | 7th |
| 23 | Kenny "Babyface" Edmonds | 11th |

=== Dancing with the Stars performances ===
==== With celebrity partner: Jonathan Bennett ====
Season average: 28.7

| Week # | Dance/Song | Judges' score | | | | Result |
|---|---|---|---|---|---|---|
| Week # | Dance/Song | Inaba | Goodman | J. Hough | Tonioli | Result |
| 1 | Jive / "Dance with Me Tonight" | 8 | 7 | 7 | 8 | Safe |
| 2 | Cha-cha-cha / "Sing" | 7 | 7 | 8 | 8 | Safe |
| 3 | Tango / "Back to Black" | 8 | 8^{1} | 8 | 8 | Bottom two |
| 4 | Samba / "Milkshake" | 6 | 6^{2} | 6 | 6 | Safe |
| 5^{3} | Jitterbug / "Rock This Town" | 6 | 6^{4} | 6 | 6 | No Elimination |
| 6 | Jazz / "Back in Time" | 8 | 8^{5} | 8 | 8 | Eliminated |

===== Notes =====
- ^{1}Score given by guest judge Kevin Hart in place of Goodman.
- ^{2}The American public scored the dance in place of Goodman with the average score being counted alongside the three other judges.
- ^{3} Only for this week, "Partner Switch-Up" week, Bennett performed with Peta Murgatroyd instead of her while she performed with Antonio Sabàto Jr.
- ^{4}Score given by guest judge Jessie J in place of Goodman.
- ^{5}Score given by guest judge Pitbull in place of Goodman.

==== With celebrity partner: Riker Lynch ====
Season average: 37.3

| Week # | Dance/Song | Judges' score | | | | Result |
|---|---|---|---|---|---|---|
| Week # | Dance/Song | Inaba | Goodman | J. Hough | Tonioli | Result |
| 1 | Jive / "What I Like About You" | 8 | 7 | 8 | 8 | No Elimination |
| 2 | Foxtrot / "Sugar" | 8 | 8 | 8 | 8 | Safe |
| 3 | Salsa / "Limbo" | 9 | 7 | 9 | 9 | Safe |
| 4 | Tango / "Shut Up and Dance" | 8 | 8 | 9 | 9 | Bottom two |
| 5 | Paso Doble / "He's a Pirate" | 10 | 9 | 9 | 10 | Safe |
| 6 | Samba / "Want to Want Me"; Team Freestyle / "Trouble" | 10; 10 | 8; 9 | 9; 10 | 10; 10 | Safe |
| 7 | Quickstep / "Wiggle" | 9 | 10 | 9 | 9 | Safe |
| 7 | Salsa Dance-Off / "Temperature" | No | Extra | Points | Awarded | Safe |
| 8 | Viennese Waltz / "What Now"; Jazz / "A Little Party Never Killed Nobody (All We Got)" | 10; 10 | 9; 9 | 10; 10 | 10; 10 | Bottom two |
| 9 Semi-finals | Contemporary / "Work Song"; Argentine Tango / "Für Elise" | 10; 10 | 10; 10 | 10; 10 | 10; 10 | Safe |
| 10; Finals | Paso Doble / "He's a Pirate"; Freestyle / "I Won't Dance (Step Up 3D Remix)"; Salsa & Quickstep Fusion / "Classic" | 10; 10; 10 | 10; 10; 10 | 10; 10; 10 | 10; 10; 10 | Runner-up |

==== With celebrity partner: Andy Grammer ====
Season average: 24.5

| Week # | Dance/Song | Judges' score | | | Result |
|---|---|---|---|---|---|
| Week # | Dance/Song | Inaba | J. Hough | Tonioli | Result |
| 1 | Foxtrot / "Marvin Gaye" | 7 | 7 | 7 | No Elimination |
| 2 | Jive / "Only the Good Die Young" | 7 | 7 | 7 | Safe |
| 2 | Contemporary / "Heaven Is a Place on Earth" | 8 | 8 | 7 | Safe |
| 3 | Quickstep / "Bandstand Boogie" | 7 | 8/7^{1} | 7 | Bottom two |
| 4 | Cha-cha-cha / "Good to Be Alive (Hallelujah)" | 7 | 8 | 8 | Safe |
| 5^{2} | Argentine Tango / "Can't Feel My Face" | 9 | 9/9^{3} | 9 | No Elimination |
| 6 | Jazz / "Good Morning" | 10 | 10/10^{4} | 10 | Safe |
| 7 | Paso Doble / "The Beautiful People" | 9 | 9 | 8 | Safe |
| 7 | Team Freestyle / "This Is Halloween" | 10 | 10 | 10 | Safe |
| 8 | Viennese Waltz / "Isn't She Lovely" | 8 | 7 | 7 | Eliminated |
| 8 | Samba Dance-Off / "Lean On" | Awarded | 2 | Points | Eliminated |

===== Notes =====
- ^{1} Score given by guest judge Alfonso Ribeiro.
- ^{2} Only for this week, "Partner Switch-Up" week, Grammer performed with Sharna Burgess instead of Holker. Holker performed with Hayes Grier.
- ^{3} Score given by guest judge Maksim Chmerkovskiy.
- ^{4} Score given by guest judge Olivia Newton-John.

==== With celebrity partner: Babyface ====
Season average: 26.3

| Week # | Dance/Song | Judges' score | | | | Result |
|---|---|---|---|---|---|---|
| Week # | Dance/Song | Inaba | Goodman | J. Hough | Tonioli | Result |
| 1 | Foxtrot / "'Deed I Do" | 7 | 6 | 6 | 7 | No Elimination |
| 2 | Argentine Tango / "The X-Files" | 8 | 7 | 7 | 8 | Safe |
| 3 | Jive / "Great Gosh A'Mighty" | 7 | 6 | 6 | 6 | Safe |
| 4 | Tango / "Come Together" | 6 | —N/a | 6 | 6 | Eliminated |

== Personal life ==
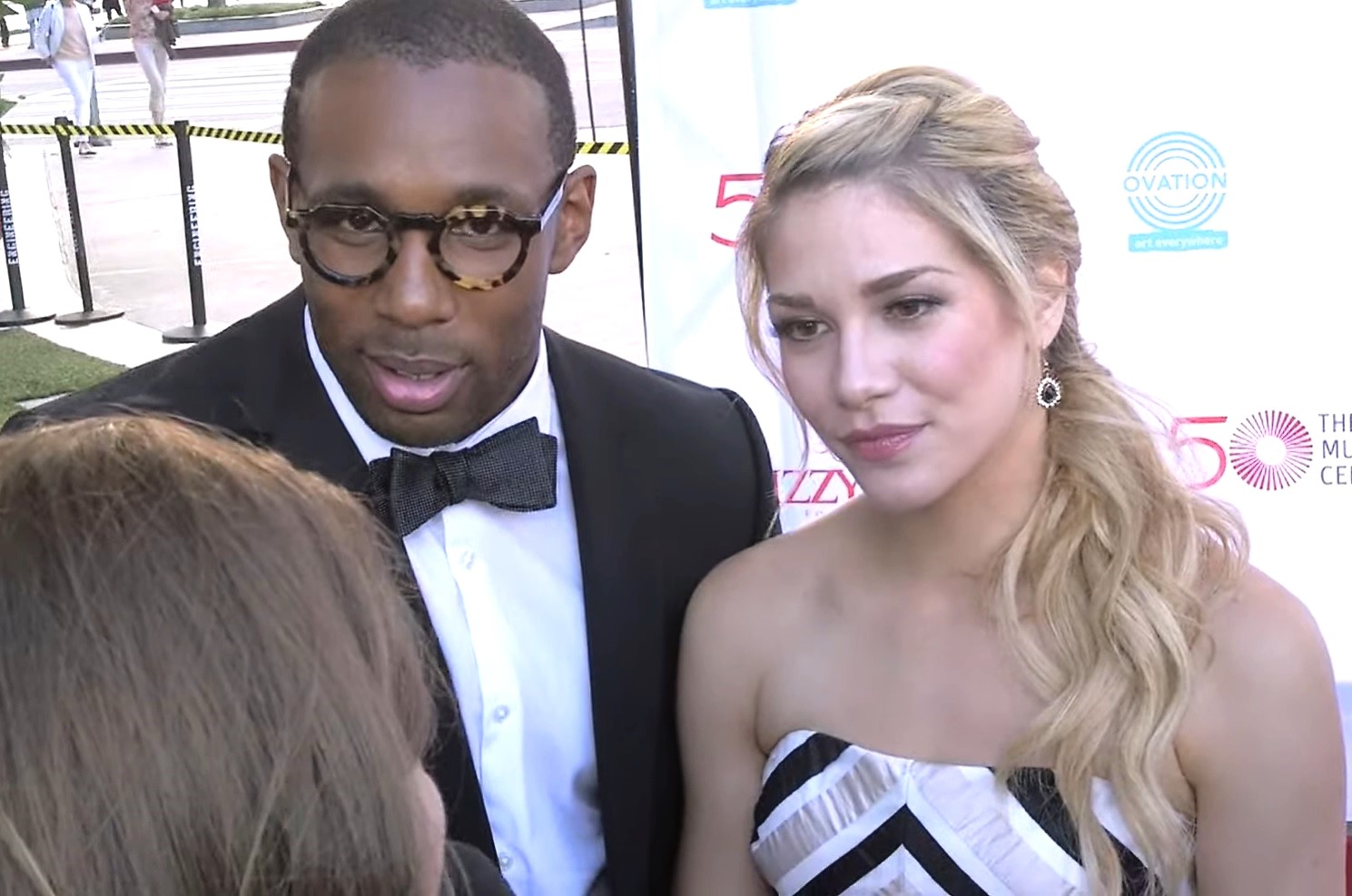
Holker with Stephen "tWitch" Boss in 2014

In 2013, Holker and fellow So You Think You Can Dance all-star, Stephen "tWitch" Boss, were married at Villa San-Juliette Winery in Paso Robles, California, owned by SYTYCD producer and judge Nigel Lythgoe. The couple had two children together, a son born in 2016 and a daughter born in 2019. Holker also has a daughter (born 2008) with her former fiancé.

On December 14, 2022, it was announced that Stephen Boss had died by suicide the day before.

In September 2024, Holker confirmed her relationship with Adam Edmunds, a chief executive officer at the software development company Entrata.

In February 2026, Holker confirmed her engagement to Adam Edmunds.

== Filmography ==
Film and television
| Year | Title | Role | Notes |
|---|---|---|---|
| 2006–2017 | So You Think You Can Dance | Herself | Dancer; 42 episodes |
| 2006 | High School Musical | Cheerleader Dancer | Disney Channel Original Film |
| 2007 | High School Musical 2 | East High Dancer | Disney Channel Original Film |
| 2011 | House | Dancer #3 | Episode: "Bombshells" |
| 2011 | Footloose | Dancer #3 | Uncredited; Film |
| 2012–18 | Dancing with the Stars | Herself | Dancer; 41 episodes |
| 2013 | Make Your Move | Gina | Film |
| 2013–14 | Hit the Floor | Devil Girl | 18 episodes |
| 2015–21 | The Ellen DeGeneres Show | Herself | Guest DJ and musical guest; 7 episodes |
| 2017–2020 | Disney's Fairy Tale Weddings | Herself | Co-host; 10 episodes |
| 2020 | The Funny Dance Show | Herself | Judge; 7 episodes |
| 2020 | Dance Like a Boss | Herself | Host |
| 2021 | Design Star: Next Gen | Herself | Host |
| 2022 | Guy's Ultimate Game Night | Herself | Contestant; Episode: "Smells Like Team Spirit" |
| 2025 | Dancing with Sharks | Herself | Judge; Shark Week special |

== Awards ==
- 2004: National Senior Performer of the Year from Company Dance
- 2005: National Senior Outstanding Dancing for New York City Dance Alliance
- 2007: National Senior Dancer of the Year
- 2013: Primetime Emmy Award Nomination for Outstanding Choreography

== Books ==
- Holker, Allison (February 4, 2025). This Far: My Story of Love, Loss, and Embracing the Light (1st hardcover ed.). Nashville, TN: Harper Select. ISBN 9781400248940. OCLC 1491317977.

Awards and achievements
| Preceded by Sadie Robertson & Mark Ballas | Dancing with the Stars (US) Runner-up; Season 20 (Spring 2015 with Riker Lynch) | Succeeded by Nick Carter & Sharna Burgess |
