= Pantos =

Pantos may refer to:

- Pantomimes, musical comedy stage productions, developed in England and mostly performed during Christmas and New Year season
- American pantomimes, theatre entertainments, derived from the distinctly English entertainment genre
- Pantos Logistics, a company based in South Korea

== People with the surname ==
- Anastasios Pantos (born 1976), Greek footballer
- Stamatis Pantos (born 1990), Cypriot footballer

== See also ==
- Panto (disambiguation)
