= Aladdin and his Winter Wish =

American panto version of Aladdin

Aladdin and his Winter Wish is an American panto version of the Middle Eastern folk tale Aladdin. The panto's book was written by Kris Lythgoe and its music is based around classic pop tunes by artists such as Ray Charles, Coldplay, and Starship. Aladdin and his Winter Wish premiered at the Pasadena Playhouse on December 11, 2013 and ran through December 29 of the same year.

== Plot ==
The story follows the general Aladdin pantomime. Wishee Washee is Aladdin’s brother and Widow Twankey is Aladdin’s mother.

== Songs ==
=== Act 1 ===
- Jai Ho - Ensemble
- I'm Too Sexy - Widow Twankey
- Break My Stride - Aladdin and Wishee
- You Don’t Know Me - Aladdin
- Old Time Rock’n’ Roll - Widow Twankey
- What Makes You Beautiful
- Call Me Maybe - Princess
- Billionairre - Aladdin
- Fantasy - Genie

=== Act 2 ===
- Treasure - Aladdin
- Viva La Vida - Abanazar
- Nothing's Gonna Stop Us Now - Aladdin and Princess
- Walking on Sunshine - Aladdin and Princess
- Merry Christmas Everyone - Ensemble

== Reception ==
Reception for Aladdin and his Winter Wish was positive. The Los Angeles Times gave it a positive review, stating that adults would be likely to enjoy it as much as their children would. Los Angeles magazine and LA Weekly also praised the work, with Los Angeles citing Ben Vereen's performance as a highlight.
