= Jennifer Leigh Warren =

American actress

Jennifer Leigh Warren is an American stage, television, film, and voice-over actress/singer who first came to the world's attention for her work in professional musical theater. She is best known for originating the role of Crystal in the Howard Ashman /Alan Menken hit musical Little Shop of Horrors, for her performance in the original Broadway cast of the Michael John LaChiusa musical Marie Christine and for her show stopping performance in the role of Alice's Daughter in the original Broadway musical "Big River" with the song "How Blest We Are" written especially for her by Roger Miller.

She is an NAACP Theatre Award nominee, Los Angeles Times Ovation Award winner (and three-time nominee), Backstage Garland award winner, and won two Broadway World awards in the same season for her portrayal of the fairy godmother in the first US pantomime production A Cinderella Christmas directed by Bonnie Lythgoe and for her one-woman concert event Diamonds Are Forever:The Songs of Dame Shirley Bassey, that premiered in Los Angeles at the Renberg Theater, directed by Richard Jay-Alexander.

== Filmography ==
=== Film ===
- Valentine's Day (2010)
- Firehouse Dog (2007)
- The Other Sister (1999)
- Matter of Trust (1998)
- Scooby-Doo on Zombie Island (1998) Video
- Sour Grapes (1998)
- Grace of My Heart (1996)
- The Crossing Guard (1995)
- What's Love Got to Do with It (1993)
- Forever, Lulu (1987)

=== Television ===
- Rent: Live (2019) TV Movie
- A Night with Janis Joplin (2019) TV Movie
- Pretty Little Liars (2013–2014)
- Faux Baby (2008)
- Lipstick Jungle (2008)
- Dirt (2008)
- Scrubs (2007)
- Jake in Progress (2005)
- Charlie Lawrence (2003)
- Touched by an Angel (2001)
- Sliders (1999 "Java Jive" episode - 5/8)
- ER (1996)
- The Wayans Bros. (1996)
- The Wayans Bros. (1995)
- Homefront (1992)
- Santa Barbara (1992)
- God Bless the Child (1988) TV Movie
- The Gift of Amazing Grace (1986) TV Movie
- Robert Klein on Broadway (1986)

== Discography ==
- The Stephen Schwartz Album, 1999 Varese Saraband.
- Big River: Original Cast Album, 1988 Verve.
- Little Shop of Horrors: Original Cast Album, 1982 Decca U.S. Label.
