= Simon Lythgoe =

British television producer

Simon Lythgoe is a British film and television producer. Shows he has produced include Meet Me Next Christmas, American Idol, Disney's Fairy Tale Weddings, So You Think You Can Dance. He was born in England and educated at Felsted School, St. Alban's College and National Film School in Beaconsfield, England. He is the son of theatre director Bonnie Lythgoe and television executive Nigel Lythgoe.

== Early life ==
Born in North London, England, to choreographer Nigel Lythgoe and dancer Bonnie Lythgoe, he grew up in Cuffley, Hertfordshire. After attending Keble School in Winchmore Hill, North London, Simon later attended Felsted Boarding School in Essex. After completing 10 GCSEs, he attended Oaklands College in St. Albans for his A-Levels in Film Studies, Psychology and Art. Then Simon attended the National Film School in Beaconsfield for several industry courses.

== Career ==
Simon's career began in theatre, where at the early age of fifteen he was a stage-hand and performer in the local professional Panto at the Millfield Theatre in North London, England. For three consecutive years, Simon performed and was the Assistant Stage Manager in "Jack & The Beanstalk", "Aladdin" and "Robin Hood" while simultaneously moving from theatre into television.

Upon completion of his studies, he worked for London Weekend Television as a senior runner and an Assistant Floor Manager. His credits include The Late Show with David Letterman, The Royal Variety Performance, Don't Forget Your Toothbrush, An Audience with…, Gladiators, The Brian Conley Show, The Big Big Talent Show, and The British Comedy Awards.

In 1993, Lythgoe traveled to Australia to work on the country’s longest running soap opera, Home & Away, and the Aussie version of Gladiators for Kevin Jacobson Productions. The three month engagement turned into a yearlong commitment, when Lythgoe decided to stay in Sydney working for the Seven Network. His titles ranged from 3rd Assistant Director to Floor Manager, and later a Researcher and then Associate Producer.

Returning to England, Lythgoe stayed in scripted drama working as a 1st Assistant Director for the Sky series Dream Team, produced by Hewland International. During this the time, he also attended the National Film and Television School.

Returning to Australia in 1998, Lythgoe emigrated permanently to Sydney. At the Seven Network, he worked on the Sydney 2000 Olympics, Win Roy & H.G.'s Money, The Monday Dump, Saturday Disney, House of Hits, The Morning Shift, Big Arvo, and the People's Choice Awards, along with numerous sports events, including the Bledisloe Cup, AFL, Super 12 Rugby, and the Lions Tour.

In addition to television production, Simon returned to the theatre, working as the assistant manager and tech supervisor for the Zenith Theatre in Chatswood for three years.

In 1999, Lythgoe was employed by Screentime Pty. Ltd. working in program development. After completing one of Australia's highest rating and groundbreaking series, Popstars, Lythgoe coerced his father, Nigel Lythgoe, to license the format for Britain's ITV network. With the overwhelming success of Popstars in the UK, Nigel formed 19 Television with Simon Fuller, and the format evolved into Pop Idol. This format was later sold to the USA, known as American Idol.

In 2002, Lythgoe left Australia and moved to Hollywood to help produce American Idol with his father, Nigel. Lythgoe produced some of Idol's biggest success stories, including Carrie Underwood, Fantasia Barrino and Ruben Studdard. During this period, Lythgoe was also produced So You Think You Can Dance. After six seasons of Idol and three of SYTYCD, Lythgoe was poached by Steven Spielberg and Mark Burnett as a producer for the Fox Network's On the Lot.

Upon completion, Lythgoe was employed as an Executive for American Idol's parent company, Fremantle Media North America. During his contract, Lythgoe produced CMT's Can You Duet, NBC's Celebrity Family Feud, Fox's Osbourne Reloaded and advised on America's Got Talent, I've Got Your Number and Let's Make A Deal.

In 2010, Lythgoe left Fremantle Media North America and set up his own company, Legacy Productions. The production company established development deals with a number of development executive producers in Hollywood. In the first quarter of 2011, Legacy Productions, with Simon as the showrunner, produced CMT's Next Superstar for Country Music Television. The series was commissioned for a second season, but was later cancelled for creative and budgetary reasons. In 2012, Simon developed, directed and was the Showrunner on A Chance to Dance for Ovation and Opening Act for the E! Network. More recently Lythgoe was the Co-Executive Producer for a CBS pilot, The Spotlight.

In 2015 Lythgoe returned to Sydney, Australia to help produce "Aladdin" at the State Theatre for Bonnie Lythgoe Productions before returning to television in Los Angeles. He then produced a Wife Swap-type pilot with the production company 44Blue and the Disney cable network Freeform entitled Take My Kids. Simon produced for the same network a special called Disney's Fairy Tale Weddings, starring Pentatonix. This later turned into a number of specials, followed by the first series being commissioned starring Olivia Newton-John, Hunter Hayes, and Martina McBride among others. In between these episodes, Simon produced Decorating Disney: Holiday Magic and Decorating Disney: Halloween Magic starring Whoopi Goldberg, Jordan Fisher, Cierra Ramirez and Sofia Carson. Both series and specials won the Bronze Tele Award for Best Entertainment Show.

In 2019, with the success of Disney's Fairy Tale Weddings, Simon became the executive producer and showrunner for Season 2 as it was transferred from the cable channel Freeform to Disney's new streaming service, Disney+. It was the first reality-shiny floor performance type show of its kind on the new platform. Season 2 of Disney's Fairy Tale Weddings began streaming on Valentine's Day 2020.

At the turn of 2020, Legacy Productions, along with Simon Lythgoe, announced their partnership with music icon John Legend to produce a new hybrid dating singing competition taken from a Korean format, Love At First Song. The CBS pilot was cancelled due to the global pandemic.

In 2023, Variety magazine announced Lythgoe was executive producing a Netflix feature film, Meet Me Next Christmas, starring Christina Milian.

== Filmography ==
Producer (selected credits)

- So You Think You Can Dance (US)
- American Idol
- Can You Duet
- CMT's Next Superstar
- A Chance To Dance
- Celebrity Family Feud
- On The Lot
- America's Got Talent
- Opening Act
- Popstars (Australia)
- Disney's Fairy Tale Weddings (TV series)
- Meet Me Next Christmas

Director

- CMT's Next Superstar
- A Chance To Dance
- Opening Act
- Decorating Disney: Holiday Magic
- Decorating Disney: Halloween Magic
- Disney's Fairy Tale Weddings (TV series)

== Awards and honours ==
- 2018 Tele Award Bronze - Winner
- 2017 Tele Award Bronze - Winner
- 2007 Producers Guild of America: Reality/Competition Program - Nominee
- 2007 Emmy: Outstanding Reality/Competition Program - Nominee
- 2006 Peoples Choice Award: Reality Show - Winner
- 2006 Emmy: Outstanding Reality/Competition Program - Nominee
- 2005 Emmy: Outstanding Reality/Competition Program - Nominee
- 2004 Emmy: Outstanding Reality/Competition Program - Nominee
- 2003 Grammy: Album of the Year - Nominee
