= Disney's Fairy Tale Weddings =

- Genre: Documentary television
- Created by: Kary McHoul
- Country of origin: United States
- Original language: English
- No. of seasons: 2
- No. of episodes: 14 episodes + 2 specials

Production
- Executive producers: Ann Lewis Roberts; Simon Lythgoe; Jenny Daly; Jill Garelick
- Running time: 63 minutes
- Production companies: T Group Productions; Roberts Media; Legacy Productions

Original release
- Network: Freeform (Season 1); Disney+ (Season 2)
- Release: May 7, 2017 – April 3, 2020

Disney's Fairy Tale Weddings is a documentary television series featuring couples and their Disney-themed weddings, airing on Disney's Freeform network and the Disney+ streaming service. The series was removed from Disney+ on May 26, 2023.

== Synopsis ==
The show provides a behind-the-scenes look at the weddings and engagements of couples that take place at Disney destinations including Walt Disney World, Disneyland, Disney Cruise Line, and at Aulani in Hawaii. It is coordinated by Disney's Fairy Tale Weddings.

== Release ==
A Disney's Fairy Tale Weddings 90–minute special was announced on March 29, 2017. The special was broadcast via Freeform on May 7, 2017. The special was hosted by Ben Higgins and Lauren Bushnell from The Bachelor. On October 17, 2017, Freeform announced the production of a seven-episode series for Summer 2018 to be hosted by Allison Holker and Stephen "tWitch" Boss. In November 2017, Freeform added a December 11, 2017 hour-long special, Disney's Fair Tale Weddings: Holiday Magic as part of its 25 Days of Christmas event. The series premiered on June 11, 2018. The first season concluded on July 16, 2018.

The second season premiered on Disney+ on February 14, 2020.

== Episodes ==
=== Specials (2017) ===
No. overall	No. in season	Title	Directed by	Original release date	US viewers (millions)
Special	Special	"Disney's Fairy Tale Weddings"	Simon Lythgoe	May 7, 2017	0.64
Hosted by The Bachelor alums Ben Higgins and Lauren Bushnell. The documentary follows four couples through their Disney wedding journey including a surprise performance by a cappella group Pentatonix.

No. overall	No. in season	Title	Directed by	Original release date	US viewers (millions)
Special	Special	"Holiday Magic"	Simon Lythgoe	December 11, 2017	0.90
Hosted by Stephen Boss and Allison Holker, this holiday-themed episode follows Dominique and Joe, and Greg and Melanie through their ceremonies and receptions. The end of the episode shows a preview of the upcoming season, including a glimpse of Eric’s epic surprise proposal to Kelley at Aulani in Hawaii.

=== Season 1 (2018) ===
No. overall	No. in season	Title	Directed by	Original release date	US viewers (millions)
1	1	"Relationship Goals"	Chris Wilson	June 11, 2018	0.45
John has always dreamed of getting married at Disney.
2	2	"A Rustic Romance"	Chris Wilson	June 18, 2018	0.35
David plans an island proposal for Nicole.
3	3	"Royally Inspired"	Chris Wilson	June 25, 2018	0.29
Gabriela and Tanner renew their vows at Epcot.
4	4	"The Circle of Love"	Chris Wilson	July 2, 2018	0.23
Lorina and Greg wed in front of the Tree of Life.
5	5	"Sea of Love"	Chris Wilson	July 9, 2018	0.29
A surprise proposal at Aulani Resort in Hawaii.
6	6	"Do You Believe in Magic"	Chris Wilson	July 16, 2018	0.26
A couple's wedding inside Disney's Hollywood Studios.

=== Season 2 (2020) ===
No. overall	No. in season	Title	Directed by	Original release date
7	1	"Marching Down the Aisle"	Chris Wilson	February 14, 2020
A couple from Indiana get married at Disneyland Resort, and there's a surprise proposal at the Aulani resort in Hawaii.
8	2	"Alaska to Marry Me"	Chris Wilson	February 21, 2020
9	3	"A Flashy Proposal"	Chris Wilson	February 28, 2020
10	4	"Pandoran Wedding"	Chris Wilson	March 6, 2020
11	5	"Made for Loving You"	Chris Wilson	March 13, 2020
12	6	"Wedding GOALS!"	Chris Wilson	March 20, 2020
13	7	"Te Amo, Mi Amor, Again!"	Chris Wilson	March 27, 2020
14	8	"Marry Me!"	Chris Wilson	April 3, 2020
