= The Funny Dance Show =

- Created by: Heidi Heaslet; Justine Marino
- Starring: Heidi Heaslet; Justin Martindale; Loni Love; Allison Holker; Dawn Noel
- Country of origin: United States
- Original language: English

Original release
- Network: E!
- Release: 2020 – 2020

The Funny Dance Show is a 2020 E! channel competitive dance-off show.

== Overview ==
Each week two teams of celebrity comedians compete in a series of comedic dance-offs. The show was inspired by Justine Marino and Heidi Heaslet's live show at The Comedy Store.

== Critical reception ==
TheWrap wrote that there is often a moment during a Zoom gathering when conversation wanes and participants seek a light, feel-good show to watch, recommending “The Funny Dance Show” on E! as an example.
