= Matter of Trust =

1997 film by Joey Travolta

Matter of Trust is a 1997 independent erotic thriller film directed by Joey Travolta and written by John Penney. Model and dancer Dita Von Teese played a small role. Other cast members include: C. Thomas Howell as Michael D'Angelo, Joan Severance as Theresa Marsh, Nick Mancuso as Peter Marsh, Robert Miano as Ben and Jennifer Leigh Warren as Janet.

== Premise ==
A prosecutor is building a case against a suspected serial killer. She receives death threats but ignores them at first, until her husband disappears and someone blackmails her. She then turns to her ex-husband, a suspended homicide detective.

== Cast ==
- C. Thomas Howell as Michael D'Angelo
- Joan Severance as Theresa Marsh
- Nick Mancuso as Peter Marsh
- Robert Miano as Ben
- Jennifer Leigh Warren as Janet
- Randee Heller as Stoddard
- Corbin Timbrook as Danzig
- John V. Barbieri as Sandblaster
- Eddie Ebell as Billt
- Natasha Espledra as Heather
- George Georgiadis as Santos
- Melissa Greenspan as Sara
- Claire Jacobs as Ivy
- Susie McDonnell as Kim
- Vincent Riotta as Johnny
- Harold Green as AA Spokesman
- Dayna Danika as The Receptionist
- Sharone Carmi as Newscaster
- Julia Verdin as Newscaster
- Dita Von Teese as Girl With C.T.
