= Wife Swap =

Wife Swap may refer to:

- Wife swapping (an act)
  - Wife Swap (British TV series), a British reality television program
  - Wife Swap (American TV series), an American reality television program
  - Wife Swap Australia, an Australian reality television program
