= Nigel Lythgoe =

English film director and producer (born 1949)

Nigel Lythgoe OBE
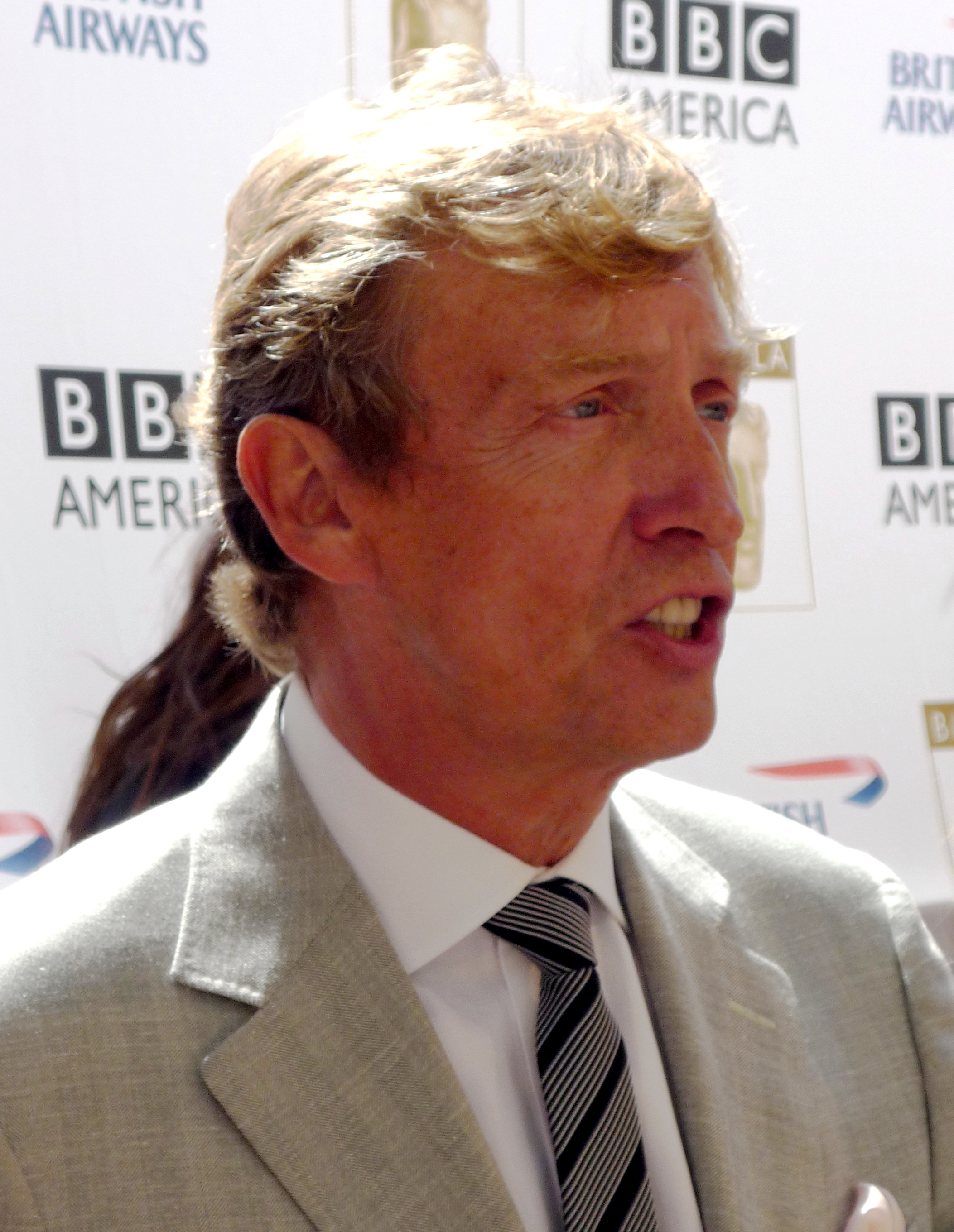
- Lythgoe in 2010
- Born: 9 July 1949 (age 77); Wallasey, Merseyside, England
- Occupations: Television director; film director; television producer; film producer; screenwriter; television personality; choreographer; former dancer
- Years active: 1969–present
- Spouse: Bonnie Shawe (m. 1974; div. 2010)
- Children: Simon & Kris

Nigel Lythgoe OBE (/ˈlɪθɡoʊ/; born 9 July 1949) is an English television and film director and producer, television dance competition judge, former dancer in the Young Generation and choreographer. He was the producer of the shows Pop Idol and American Idol and created the 2009 competition Superstars of Dance. He is also the creator and executive producer of So You Think You Can Dance, on which he served as a permanent judge for the first sixteen seasons.

== Early life ==
Lythgoe was born in Wallasey, Merseyside, to dockworker George Percival Lythgoe and Gertrude Emily Lythgoe. He became interested in dance at the age of ten and began tap dancing. He studied at the Hylton-Bromley School of Dance and Drama and the Perry Cowell School of Dance, both in Wallasey, where he studied classical ballet, modern jazz, ballroom, character, classical Greek and National dance from various countries. Lythgoe's first professional job was in the corps de ballet for the English National Ballet tour of The Merry Widow. He trained in London under Joanne Steuer and Molly Molloy. Beginning in 1969, Lythgoe performed with the BBC's dance troupe known as The Young Generation. He became their choreographer in 1971 and has since choreographed over 500 television shows.

== Career ==
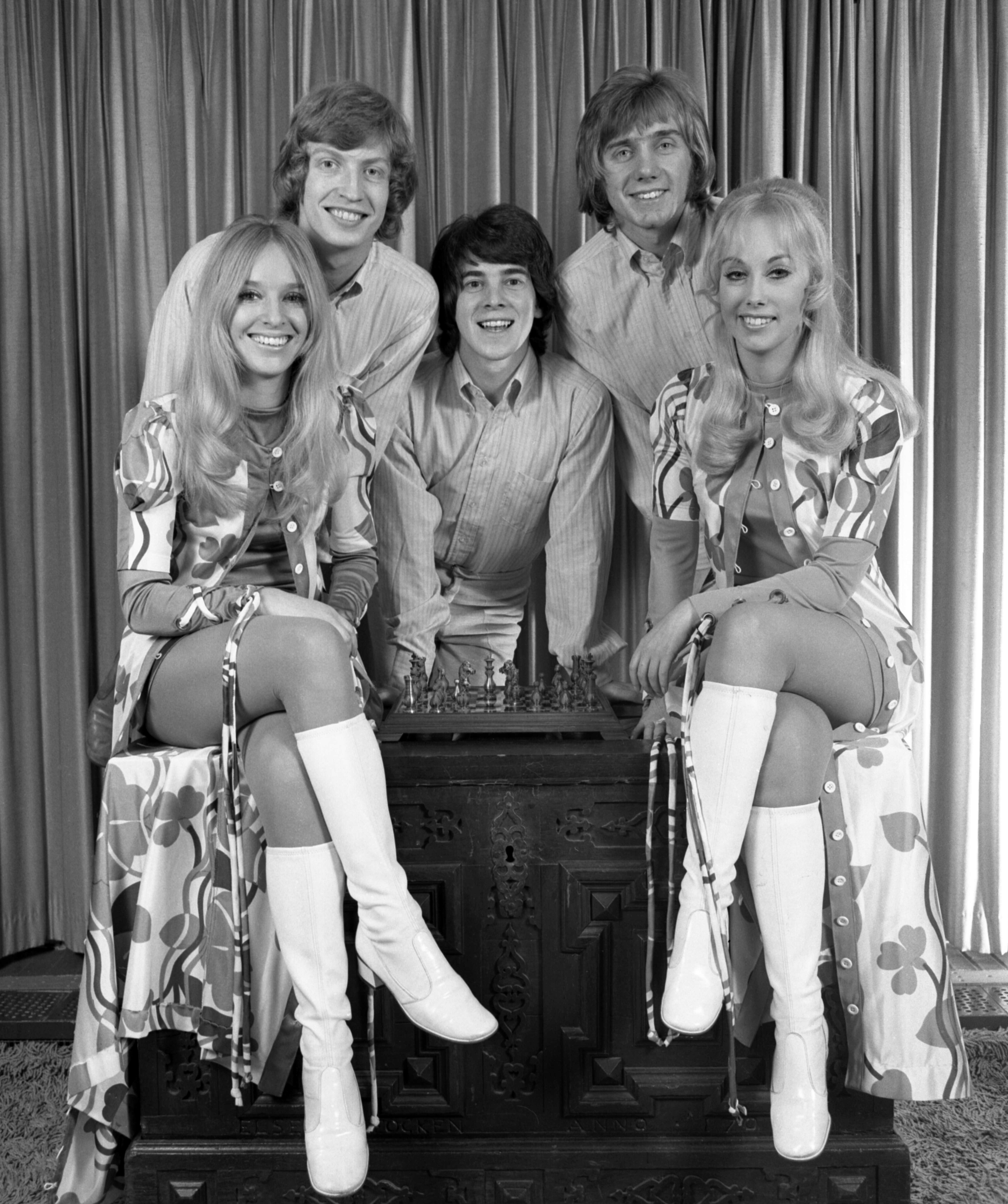
Lythgoe (top left) in 1976, with dance group

Early in Lythgoe's career, he learned to use techniques (e.g., multi-cameras) to film choreography, a skill that would help lead to a TV career.

During the 1970s and into the 1980s, Lythgoe performed with dancers including Cyd Charisse and Gene Kelly. He also choreographed for Ben Vereen, Shirley Bassey and the Muppets. Lythgoe, in an interview with People said that he was "the only person to dance, choreograph, produce and direct the Royal Variety Performance."

After working in the television industry, including at TVS, by 1995, Lythgoe held the post of Head of Entertainment and Comedy at London Weekend Television, where he commissioned and produced shows including Gladiators and Blind Date.

In 2000, Lythgoe became the so-called "tough judge" on Popstars and was nicknamed "Nasty Nigel" by the British tabloid press. He was loaned by London Weekend Television to Bob Geldof's television company Planet 24 to executive produce and direct the British version of Survivor. Lythgoe then joined Simon Fuller's 19 Entertainment group as President of 19 Television. He developed and produced a new show created by Fuller, Pop Idol. This then became a global franchise that includes American Idol. He moved to the U.S. in 2002 to produce American Idol and then became producer/judge and co-creator of So You Think You Can Dance on the FOX television network.

Lythgoe, and his production partner Ken Warwick, initially agreed to produce the 2007 Emmys, but could not due to scheduling conflicts with SYTYCD.

In 2007, Lythgoe worked with a number of California-based Brits, including then-British Consul-General Bob Peirce, to found BritWeek, an annual program of events held in Los Angeles and Orange County to celebrate the business, historical, and entertainment ties between the UK and California. On 4 August 2008, Lythgoe confirmed that he was leaving American Idol and decided to move on with So You Think You Can Dance.

In 2009, Lythgoe and Fuller formed a company called Big Red 2 Entertainment. Fuller is a fan of Manchester United and Lythgoe of Liverpool. Their first venture was Superstars of Dance for NBC. He also became a judge on So You Think You Can Dance.

On 5 August 2010, American Idol confirmed Lythgoe would be returning as an executive producer to the show beginning season 10. In 2018, Lythgoe starred in A Shakespeare Jubilee! directed by Louis Fantasia at The Wallis in Beverly Hills.

== Personal life ==
Lythgoe married Bonita Shawe in 1974, whom he met while he was choreographer for the BBC's Young Generation dance troupe. Shawe was also an audition judge on the first season of So You Think You Can Dance and was a judge on the Australian version of So You Think You Can Dance for the first three seasons. The couple divorced in 2010 after a protracted separation. They have two sons together, Simon and Kristopher. Lythgoe has dated Priscilla Presley and Raquel Welch. He owns Villa San Juliette, a vineyard in Paso Robles, California.

He suffered a heart attack in January 2003.

=== Sexual assault allegations ===
On 29 December 2023, Paula Abdul filed a lawsuit accusing Lythgoe of sexual assault while she was employed as a judge on American Idol and So You Think You Can Dance. She said that the first assault occurred in 2002, when Lythgoe allegedly groped her and “[shoved] his tongue down her throat” in a hotel elevator, wherein she pushed him away. She alleged the second assault occurred in 2015 when Lythgoe forced himself on her while she was at his house under the pretense of discussions regarding So You Think You Can Dance, a program that Lythgoe also produced. The lawsuit also claimed that Lythgoe's abuse continued after Abdul's tenure on Idol ended, and her becoming a judge on So You Think You Can Dance.

Lythgoe denied Abdul's allegations, which he described as an "appalling smear", adding:

To say that I am shocked and saddened by the allegations made against me by Paula Abdul is a wild understatement. For more than two decades, Paula and I have interacted as dear—and entirely platonic—friends and colleagues. Yesterday, however, out of the blue, I learned of these claims in the press and I want to be clear: Not only are they false, they are deeply offensive to me and to everything I stand for.

Lythgoe added that he could not "pretend to understand exactly why she would file a lawsuit that she must know is untrue." It was reported in December 2024 that the lawsuit had been settled. Abdul's attorney Melissa Eubanks did not comment on the terms of the agreement, which were kept private.

Lythgoe commented, "we live in a troubling time where a person is now automatically assumed to be guilty until proven innocent, a process that can take years [...] like Paula, I am glad to be able to put this behind me. I know the truth and that gives me great comfort."

On 2 January 2024, two contestants of the programme All American Girl, who were identified as Jane Does, sued Lythgoe, accusing him of sexual assault, sexual harassment, gender violence, emotional distress, and negligence, and alleging he "openly swatted and groped" their buttocks while he roamed around the show's set as the contestants were dressed in dance costumes; they alleged that his behaviour was "openly accepted" by the programme's production company. The 14-page document Rolling Stone magazine obtained alleges that after a wrap party in May 2003, Lythgoe took an "unusual interest" in the Jane Does, and then proceeded to try to force himself on them without their consent.

On 5 January 2024, Lythgoe departed from So You Think You Can Dance. In a statement to Variety, Lythgoe said that "I have informed the producers of 'So You Think You Can Dance' of my decision to step back from participating in this year's series." The 18th season would premiere on 4 March 2024, with Lythgoe absent.

On 5 March 2024, a new sexual assault lawsuit was filed against Lythgoe in the Los Angeles Superior Court, according to documents which were obtained by Us Weekly. The new lawsuit was the fourth sexual assault lawsuit to be filed against Lythgoe in a period of two months. In the lawsuit, a woman who identified as Jane Doe alleged Lythgoe committed sexual battery, gender violence, sexual harassment and intentional infliction of emotional distress following a 2018 incident.

== Filmography ==
Producer (selected credits)

- The Next Great American Band
- So You Think You Can Dance
- All American Girl
- American Juniors
- American Idol
- Pop Idol
- The Brian Conley Show
- Superstars of Dance
- Idol Gives Back
- CMT's Next Superstar

Director

- Superstars of Dance (2009)
- So You Think You Can Dance (2005)
- All American Girl (2003)
- American Idol (2002)
- Survivor (2001)
- Popstars (2000)
- Animals Do the Funniest Things (1999)
- TV Weekly (1988)
- Gladiators (1992)
- The Brian Conley Show

== Awards and honours ==
- 2015 OBE – Officer of the Order of the British Empire
- 2014 Ellis Island International Medal of Honor
- 2011 International Emmy: Founders Award – Winner
- 2008 Emmy: Outstanding Reality/Competition Program – Nominee
- 2007 The Governors Award – Winner
- 2007 Emmy: Outstanding Reality/Competition Program – Nominee
- 2006 Emmy: Outstanding Reality/Competition Program – Nominee
- 2005 Emmy: Outstanding Reality/Competition Program – Nominee
- 2004 Emmy: Outstanding Reality/Competition Program – Nominee
- 2003 Grammy: Album of the Year – Nominee

== See also ==
- List of celebrities who own wineries and vineyards
