= Panto (surname) =

Panto is a surname. Notable people with the surname include:

- Giorgio Panto (1941–2006), Italian entrepreneur and politician
- Hariyanto Panto (born 1998), Indonesian footballer
- Miguel Ángel Pantó (born 1912), Argentine footballer
- Pete Panto (1911–1939), Italian-American longshoreman and union activist
- Salvatore J. Panto, Jr. (born 1953), American politician
