= All-American Boys Chorus =

Non-denominational choral group

The All-American Boys Chorus started as a small church choir in Orange County, California in 1970.

== About ==
Based in Santa Ana, California, the Chorus is under the artistic direction of Wesley Martin. The Chorus attracts youth from 26 cities throughout Southern California. Programs require a small tuition payment.

The Chorus's program progresses through different stages of cognitive development, transforming an individual from a beginner vocalist to a seasoned performer while instilling leadership skills through peer-to-peer mentoring. All choristers participate in after-school and weekend music lessons with rehearsals at the Santa Ana campus, as well as performances, recordings, national and international concert tours, and an annual week-long summer camp.

Most choristers remain in the program for approximately four years, with some students continuing by joining the graduate chorus or as part-time staff or interns. All Saturday four-hour rehearsals combine periods of time for breaks, recreation, games, music education, and vocal learning.

== History ==
For over 40 years, the group worked out of rented space at the Orange County Fairgrounds.

- In 2015, the Chorus appeared on the David Benoit Trio's Believe holiday jazz album.
- In 2016, the group collaborated with a capella group Vocal Point on a cover of the track Go the Distance from Disney's Hercules.
- On August 10, 2018, Roger Giese, a vocal coach at the Chorus in 1998 was extradited from the UK to California, where he had been living incognito for nearly twenty years.
- On November 10, 2018, the Chorus performed at the lighting of the World's Tallest Live-Cut Tree' (110 ft.) in Phoenix, Arizona with Caleb Lee Hutchinson and American Idol's Maddie Poppe.

== Discography ==
- A Little Christmas Magic (1985)
- On the Sunny Side of the Street (1988)
- The Best Gift of All (1992)
- By Request (1996)
- On Tour! (2003)
- California Dreamin' (2016)
