= A Cinderella Christmas =

Pantomime of Cinderella by Kris Lythgoe

A Cinderella Christmas is a pantomime version of the fairytale Cinderella, with a book by Kris Lythgoe, using for its score a pastiche of well known pop tunes. It was first produced in 2010 at the El Portal Theatre in North Hollywood, California. The music includes songs by Lady Gaga, Michael Bublé, Katy Perry, Whitney Houston, Mariah Carey, Jennifer Lopez and Kelly Clarkson, among others. Like other pantomimes, the show includes magic, dancing, singing, acting, audience interactivity and sing-a-long segments.

== Plot ==
A Cinderella Christmas retells the classic fairytale, Cinderella, in the style of a British holiday pantomime, combining family-oriented comedy with contemporary pop music and audience interaction. Cinderella lives at "Hardup Hall" under the authority of her stepmother, Baroness Hardup. Her two stepsisters, Hollywood and Vine, are portrayed by male actors dressed as women for comic effect. Her friend Buttons works as the household's servant and serves as a guide for the audience, inviting them to participate by cheering for Cinderella and booing the villains.

Prince Charming arrives in town to host a Christmas ball and briefly exchanges roles with his aide, Dandini, leading to a case of mistaken identity when he meets Cinderella. With assistance from her Fairy Godmother, Cinderella is magically transformed and attends the ball, where she and the Prince dance and fall in love. She departs at midnight, leaving behind her glass slipper.

Buttons supports the Prince in his search for Cinderella, despite his own unreturned romantic affection for her. Cinderella’s identity is revealed, she reunites with the Prince, and the stepfamily learns the consequences of their behavior.

== Songs ==
=== Act 1 ===
- "Let's Get Loud" – Ensemble
- "California Gurls" – The Step-Sisters
- "Just Haven’t Met You Yet" – Prince Charming
- "Just Dance" – Company
- "Taking Chances" – Cinderella
- "Breakaway" – Cinderella
- "When You Believe" – Fairy Godmother

=== Act 2 ===
- "Low" – Ensemble
- "Need You Now" – Prince Charming and Cinderella
- "Somewhere over the Rainbow" – Cinderella and Buttons
- "All I Want For Christmas" – Ensemble

== Productions ==
=== El Portal Theatre ===
The show premiered in 2010 at the El Portal Theatre in North Hollywood, California, starring Freddie Stroma, Jerry Mathers and Jennifer Leigh Warren. A nationwide search in conjunction with Westfield Corporation was carried out to cast the title role. Celebrity judges included Neil Patrick Harris. This was the first pantomime seen in California for some time and received positive reviews from the press.

The show was repeated in 2011, again at the El Portal Theatre, starring Fred Willard, with Shoshana Bean as the Fairy Godmother. It again received positive reviews.

=== Pasadena Playhouse ===
Pasadena Playhouse produced the show in 2016. It was directed by Bonnie Lythgoe and choreographed by Spencer Liff, with sets by Ian Wilson and costumes by Florencia M. Carrizo.

== Roles and principal cast ==
Role	2010	2011	2016
Cinderella	Veronica Dunne	Veronica Dunne	Lauren Taylor
Fairy Godmother	Jennifer Leigh Warren	Shoshana Bean	Alex Newell/Shoshana Bean*
Charming	Freddie Stroma	Nico Evers-Swindell	Kenton Duty
Baroness Hardup			Morgan Fairchild
Buttons	Benny Harris	Todd Buonopane	Matthew Patrick Davis
Baron	Jerry Mathers	Fred Willard	
Stepsister	Mark Stephens	Eddie Driscoll	Ben Giroux
Stepsister	Mark Stephens	Jeff Sumner	Josh Adamson
Dandini			Davi Santos

*Bean played the Fairy Godmother for the December 24 and December 31 performances
