= American pantomime =

American productions patterned after British pantomime

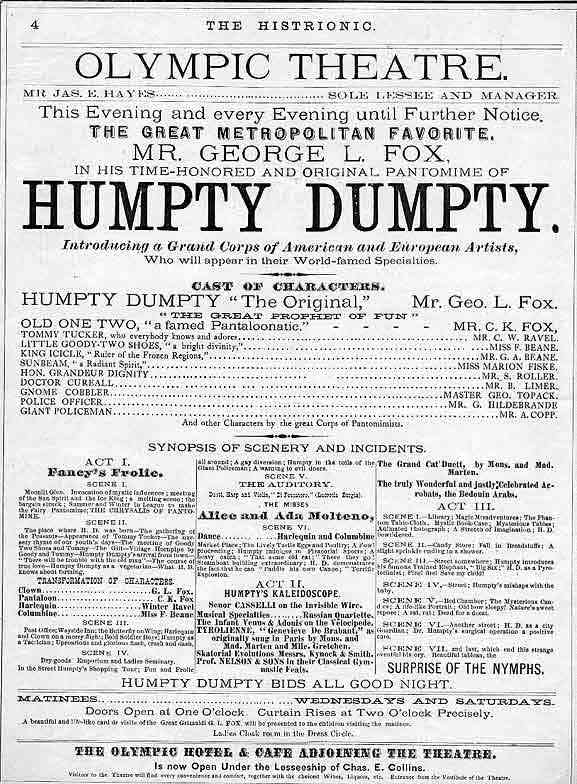
Humpty Dumpty playbill, New York, 1873 revival

American pantomime is a genre of musical theatre presented in the United States of America since 1876. It is derived pantomime, an entertainment genre that developed in England, and in the US it is presented either as in Britain or adapted for the American stage and tailored to American audiences. Pantomime in America, as in England, is usually performed at Christmas time. The entertainments, aimed at family audiences, are based on nursery stories and fairy tales, and they incorporate songs (traditional, popular and new), slapstick comedy, often topical jokes, magic, some cross-dressing, local references, audience participation, and mild adult innuendo. Like the British productions, American pantomimes incorporate audience participation. Earlier productions often also included a harlequinade.

Although pantomime was not frequently produced in the US during the 20th century and is not well known in America, productions of pantomime, both professional and amateur, have been seen nearly every year somewhere in the US since the 1990s.

== 19th century ==
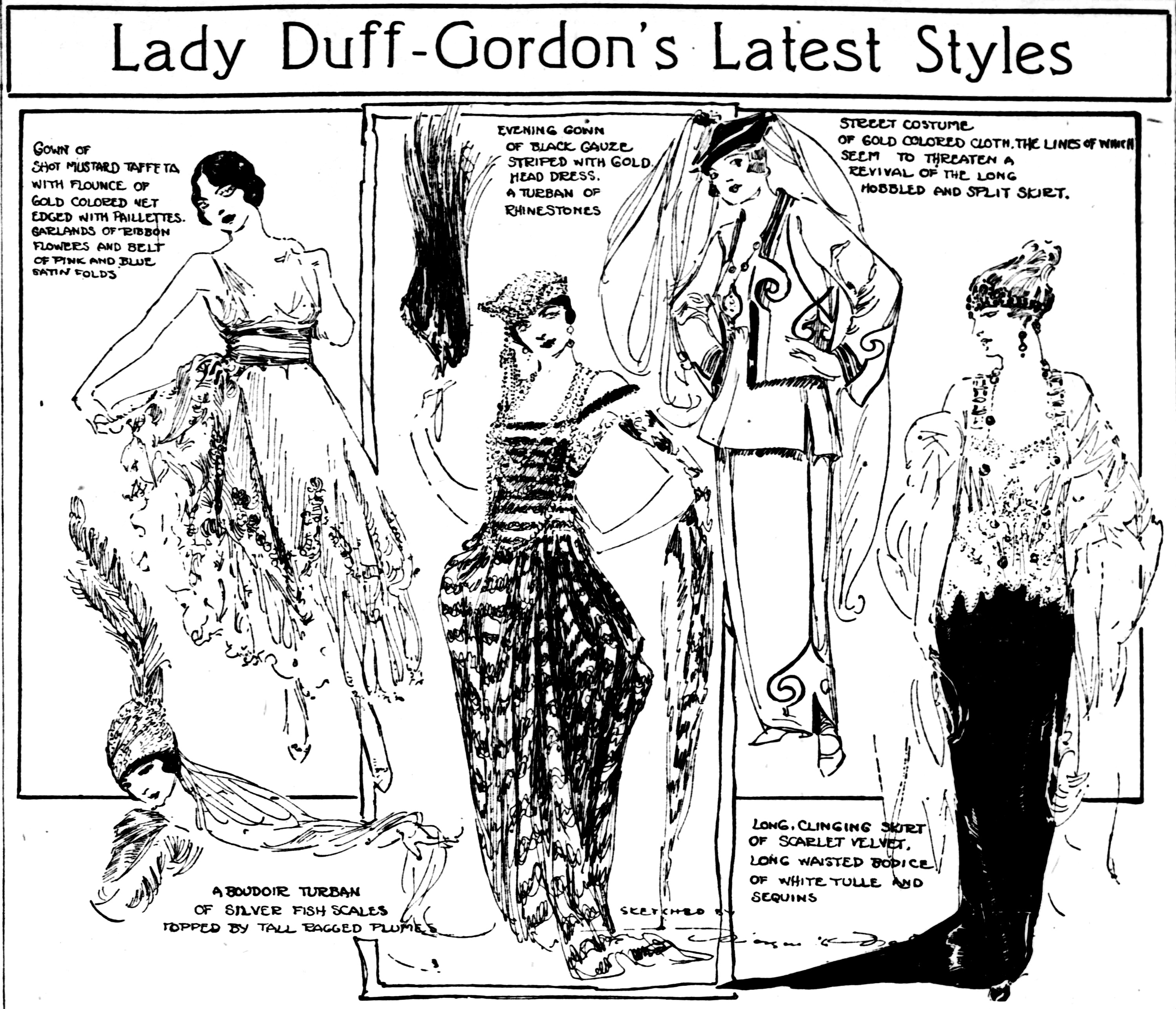
Panto styles of Lucy, Lady Duff-Gordon, sketched by Marguerite Martyn, St. Louis Post-Dispatch, 1918

The earliest known pantomime in the U.S. was Robinson Crusoe produced at St. John's Theatre, New York in 1786. Humpty Dumpty, starring and co-written by George L. Fox, premiered at Olympic Theatre in New York in 1868; it was frequently revived and eventually played for over 1,200 performances, becoming one of the most successful American pantomimes.

== 20th and 21st centuries ==
In 1993, a production of Cinderella at the UCLA Freud Theatre starred Zsa Zsa Gabor. Pantomonium Productions produced pantomimes annually in New York City from 2004 to at least 2019. Stages Repertory Theatre in Houston, Texas, has been performing original pantomime-style musicals during the Christmas holidays since 2008: Panto Sleeping Beauty, Panto Pinocchio, Panto Red Riding Hood, Panto Mother Goose and Panto Goldilocks. Since 2004, People's Light and Theatre Company, in Malvern, Pennsylvania, has been presenting an annual Christmas pantomime season. Amateur troupes include The Fremont Players in Oregon, formed in 2001.

Lythgoe Family Productions has produced pantomimes each winter since 2010 in California. Their first production was Cinderella in North Hollywood, starring Jerry Mathers and Freddie Stroma. This was followed in 2011 by A Snow White Christmas, starring Marina Sirtis as The Wicked Queen and Neil Patrick Harris as The Magic Mirror, and A Cinderella Christmas, starring Fred Willard as Baron Hardup, Cinderella's father. In 2012, the company mounted A Snow White Christmas at the Pasadena Playhouse, starring Ariana Grande as Snow White, Charlene Tilton as The Wicked Queen and Neil Patrick Harris again as The Magic Mirror. The production drew 13,000 ticket buyers. "Aladdin" was scheduled for the 2013 holiday season at Pasadena.

== Gallery ==
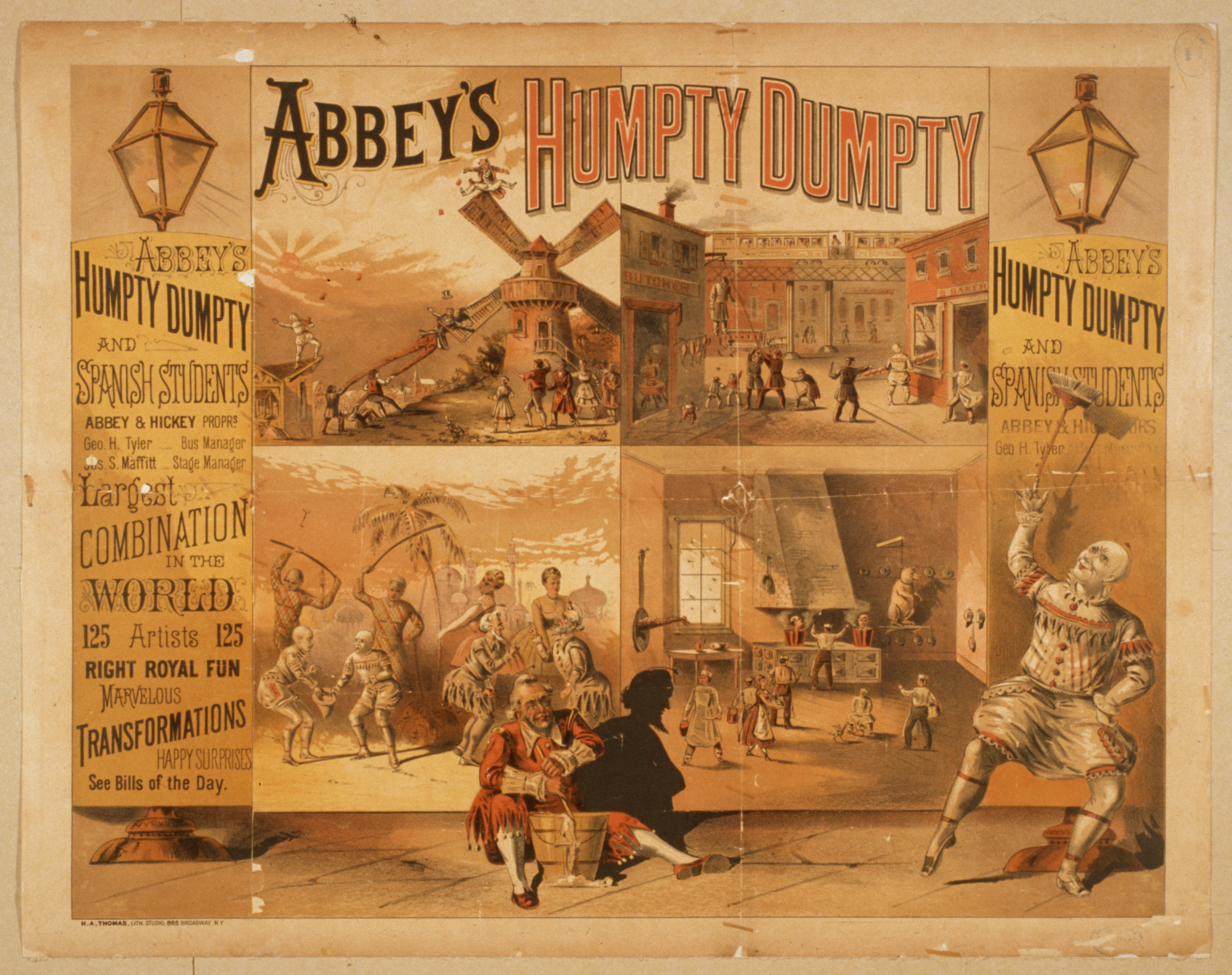
Poster for Abbey & Hickey’s Humpty Dumpty Pantomime Company (1879)

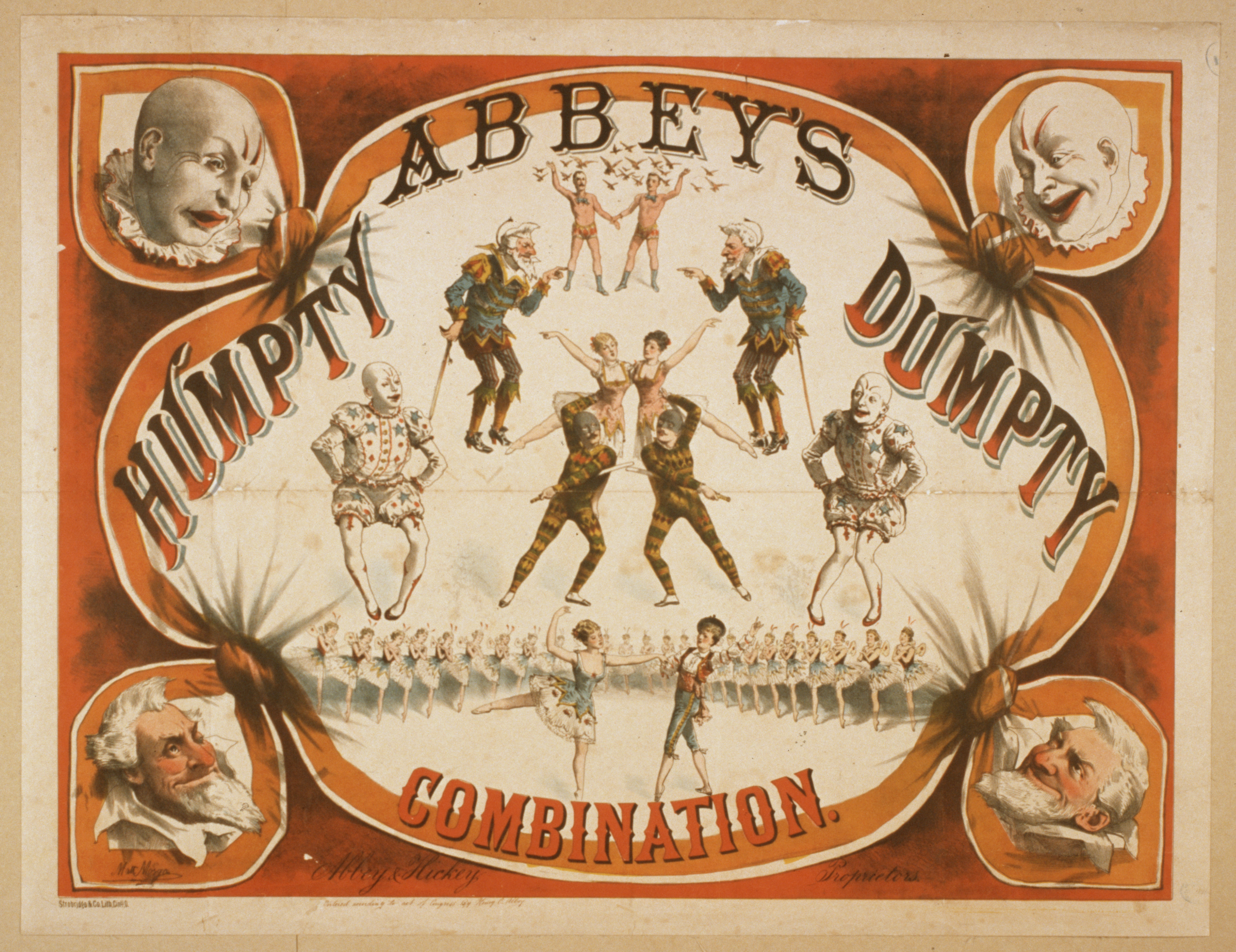
Poster for Abbey & Hickey's Humpty Dumpty, showing the show's harlequinade characters and other acts (1879).

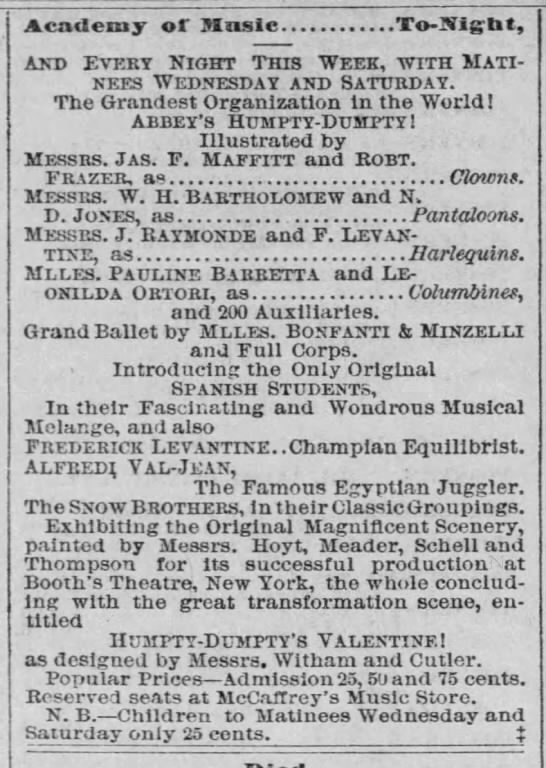
Cast list from Humpty Dumpty in a May 1880 advertisement
