= Slavik Kryklyvyy =

Ukrainian dancer

- Славік Крикливий
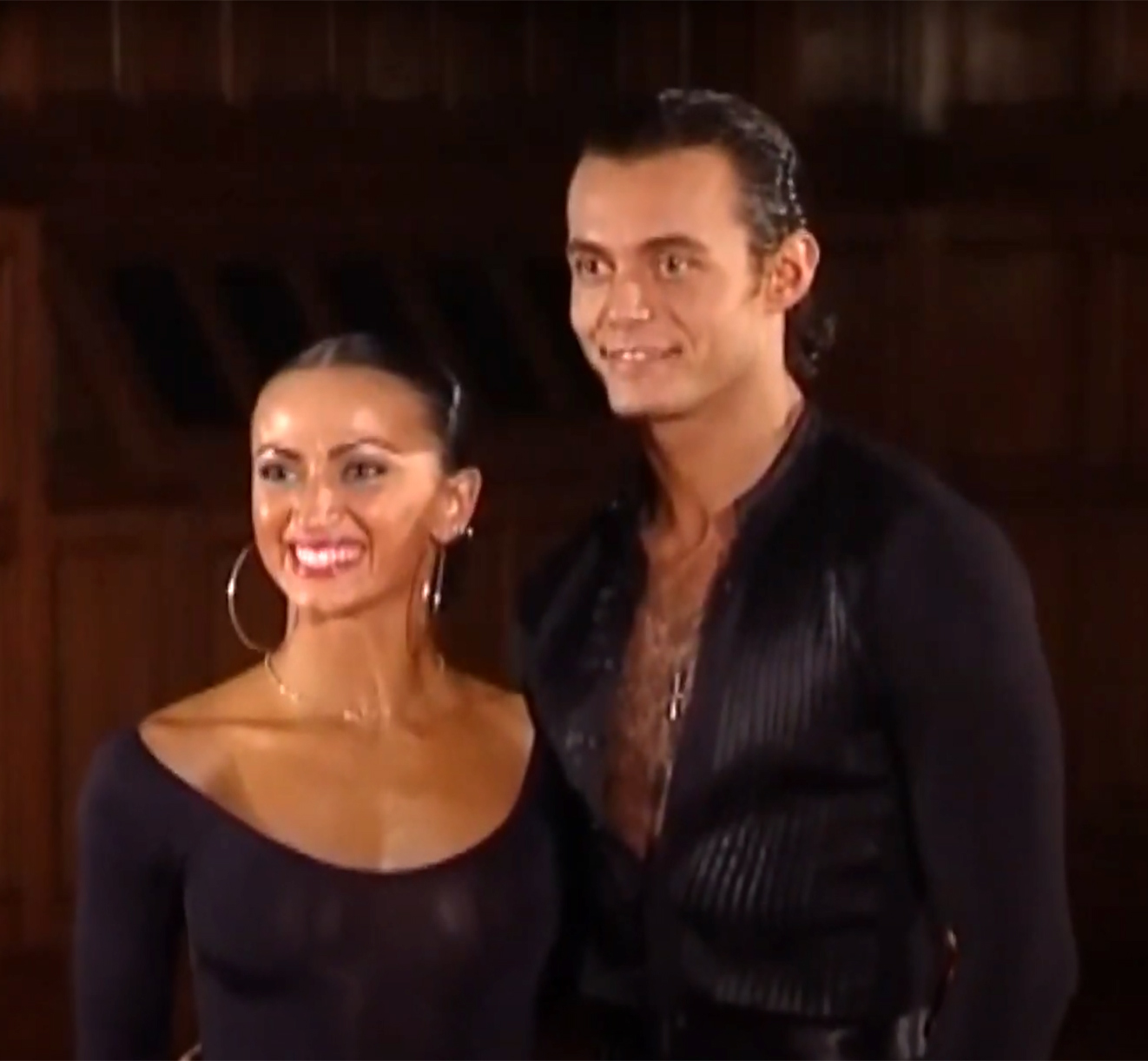
- Kryklyvyy (right) and Karina Smirnoff (left)
- Born: Vyacheslav Leonidovych Kryklyvyy; July 1, 1976 (age 49); Zaporizhzhia, Ukrainian SSR, Soviet Union (now Ukraine)
- Occupation: Ballroom dancer

Slavik Kryklyvyy (Note: Ukrainian: Славік Крикливий, romanized: Slavik Kryklyvyi) (born Vyacheslav Leonidovych Kryklyvyy, (Note: Ukrainian: В'ячеслав Леонідович Крикливий, romanized: V'iacheslav Leonidovych Kryklyvyi) July 1, 1976) is a professional ballroom dancer specializing in International Latin. Born and raised in Ukraine, he is currently residing in New York City.

== Career ==
Kryklyvyy and Joanna Leunis were amateur world champions in International Latin. In 2000, the couple took first place in the IDSF World Amateur Latin Championship, the British Open (Blackpool), the ARD Masters Gala (Germany), and the IDSF European Latin Championship. Kryklyvyy and Leunis were the first World Amateur Latin Champions in the new millennium.

After becoming a professional dancer, his longest and most successful partnership was with Karina Smirnoff with whom he became the second best couple in the world, behind the nine-time WDC world champions Bryan Watson and Carmen Vincelj. Kryklyvyy and Smirnoff split up in 2005. Kryklyvyy and his partner Smirnoff were featured in the film Shall We Dance?. Kryklyvyy was credited as the current Blackpool partner of Paulina (Jennifer Lopez) and as dance instructor.

Following the partnership with Smirnoff, he paired with Elena Khvorova. They won second place in the 2006 and 2007, World Championships, however, their results were not as good as Kryklyvyy's previous placements with Smirnoff; his former partner, Joanna Leunis started to beat them with her partner, Michael Malitowski. This probably led to the couple's split.

He next had a short-lived partnership with Hanna Karttunen who was already retired after her successful career with Paul Killick. They were second behind Watson and Vincelj and in front of Kryklyvyy and Smirnoff until their retirement. In 2008 Karttunen confirmed that she would be back on the floor with Kryklyvyy, but the 2009 UK Open Championship was a huge disappointment for both of them. The couple finished 6th, while the winners were Malitowski and Leunis.

In 2009–2010, Slavik Kryklyvyy partnered with Anna Melnikova, then amateur Latin champion, representing Russia in the international arena. Kryklyvyy and Melnikova were guest competitors as Show Performers. The couple were the subject of a feature documentary, "Ballroom Dancer", directed by Christian Holten Bonke and Andreas Koefoed.

It was probably Kryklyvyy's last chance to reach the top, but he and Melnikova could not manage the challenge. They finished 3rd in the European Professional Latin Championship and finished 5th in Blackpool and the UK Open. After they split up in 2010, Kryklyvyy started practicing with Daria Chesnokova, but they did not manage to introduce themselves on a competition.

In the fall of 2012 it was announced that Kryklyvyy would be dancing with Ekaterina Lapaeva, and their debut was announced to be at the UK Championships in January 2013. However, on November 22, Lapaeva announced that she was retiring from professional dancesport.

In April 2014, Kryklyvyy reunited with former partner Karina Smirnoff to perform in Dance Legends. Since then, the couple has occasionally performed on different events and shows.

== Film ==
Kryklyvyy danced in the 2004 Richard Gere film Shall We Dance?.

Slavik also starred in the 2011 film Ballroom Dancer with Anna Melnikova.
