= Walter Laird =

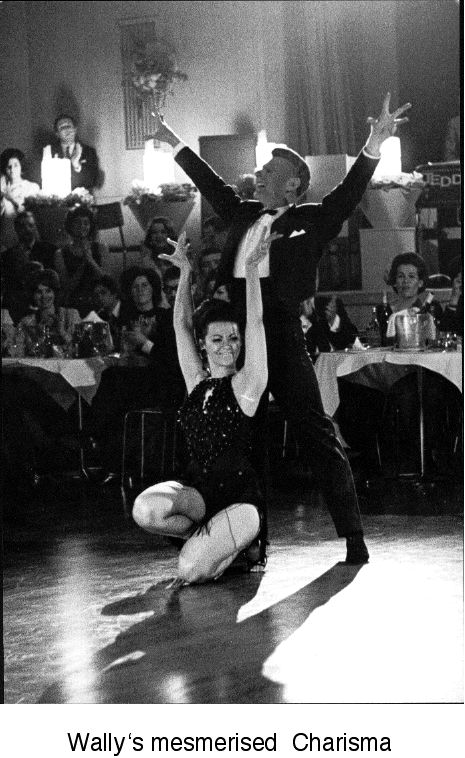
Wally's Show-Mood

Walter William Laird (26 July 1920 – 30 May 2002) was a major influence in the development of Latin American dancing in Britain after the Second World War. He was World Professional Latin Dance Champion three times. He coached many successful dancers including Allan Tornsberg, Vibeke Toft, Espen Salberg, Jukka Haapalainen, Sirpa Suutari, Donnie Burns & Ian Waite. Peter Maxwell & Lynn Harman were amongst his first major champions and a couple on which much of his ultimate technique was developed. Laird was a Fellow and Examiner of the IDTA, and until 2000, he was Secretary (and later President) of the Ballroom Dancers' Federation.

Laird first danced with his sister Joan in the 1930s. His professional partner during the war and after was Andé Lyons (née Ashcroft, and subsequently Andé Tyrer). They met when Andé was sent to the Royal Aircraft Establishment, Farnborough as a shorthand typist. One day she took dictation from Walter Laird, who was a scientist working there. At the end of the dictation, he asked her if she was keen on dancing.

"By this time, the Americans were in force in the area. Like most of the girls, I now knew how to Jitter Bug (later called the Jive), and I was having a great time! My answer to him was that I loved dancing and that I was pretty good at it too! We made a date and to my horror it turned out Walter was a professional ballroom dancer. I soon realised that I was well out of my depth. However, Walter offered to teach me to dance properly as he thought that I had potential. So that was how my second career was born!"

The Laird–Lyons partnership was entirely traditional ballroom dancing. Laird did not switch to Latin until some time after the war. Laird's three world championships (1962–1964) were in partnership with Lorraine Reynolds (now Rohdin), known professionally as 'Lorraine'. Later Walter married Julie, who continues the dance school in South London. One of Laird's greatest achievements was his Technique of Latin dancing, first published in 1961; further editions in 1964, 1972, 1977, 1983, 1988, 2003. Initially Laird followed the traditional descriptive format, but in 1972 edition he published the results of a major analysis of Latin dance, and used a tabular form, including a column for 'action used' to help definition. This edition was widely influential, and has since been accepted by many dance teacher organisations as a definitive work.

== Works ==
- Technique of Latin dancing. IDTA standard text.
  - Technique of Latin dancing supplement: technique for the British Dance Council's Appendix 1. (Latin) Figures.
- Ballroom Dance pack. 1994, 2004. Includes CD; French, German, Spanish editions exist.

== See also ==
- List of dancers
