= International Latin American Dance Champions =

Ballroom dance competitions

The International Latin American Dance Championships were created after the Second World War in England by Elsa Wells, and are now organised by Dance News special events. The current full title is the Elsa Wells International Dance Championships, and includes all categories in Standard and Latin American ballroom dance.

The series of Latin American International Championships were started once the initial choreography, teaching and adjudications standards for these dances were stabilised. This occurred in the 1950s, after a period of debate and discussion initiated by Monsieur Pierre and his associates. Although English in origin and organisation, the championships were open to the world, as is the case today for all the major ballroom championships held in England. There are two main series, one for professionals, and another for amateurs, plus various age-limited categories. The division between amateur and professional has persisted in ballroom dance long after it disappeared in most other sports and pastimes.

The final stages for both Amateur and Professional Standard and Latin American titles are always held at the Albert Hall in London. Qualification for these final stages, and the championships for other categories (Juvenile, Under 14, Junior, Under 21, Senior, Pro Rising Stars) are held at a preliminary two-day event before the main finals at Brentwood, Essex. Non-English adjudicators are always included in the adjudication panels. It is one of the largest regular, and genuinely international, events in the ballroom dance world.

This list (and competition) is not the same as the later WDC World Championships. The International Professional Latin and Standard Championships are now part of the World Dance Council's World Super Series.

== The dances ==
The Latin American competition comprises five dances: cha-cha-cha, samba, rumba, paso doble, and jive, conducted in line with British Dance Council (BDC) regulations; the basis of the dances is described in standard texts. Advanced choreography has, however, broken through the traditional limitations of social dancing, and more obviously in the Latin and American dances than in ballroom (Modern or Standard).

== Adjudication ==
The qualifying and lesser events days at Brentwood had, in 2009, three adjudication panels of eight former champions and other significant professionals. Early rounds had one panel of eight, alternating. Semi-finals and finals of lesser events had both panels. At the Albert Hall, there were four panels, each of 19 adjudicators. The semi-finals and finals of the amateur and professional titles were each adjudicated by a separate panel. This may be contrasted favourably with the number of judges used for those Olympic Games events which depend upon adjudication, such as ice dancing and diving. Results and adjudication details (marks for each finalist by each adjudicator) are posted after the event.

== 2009 entrants ==
In the Professional Championship there were 150 couples from 34 countries of affiliation (countries of origin not listed). In the Amateur Championship there were 289 couples from 31 countries of affiliation. Countries such as China, Japan, Russia and Italy sent multiple entries to all competitions. The countries listed in the table below are countries of origin, where known.

== International Professional Champions ==
Professional Champions
1953	Jack Orton-Smith & Norma Noble	England
1954	Leonard Patrick & Doreen Key	England
1955	James Arnell & Jillian La Valette	England
1956	James Arnell & Jillian La Valette	England
1957	James Arnell & Jillian La Valette	England
1958	James Arnell & Jillian La Valette	England
1959	James Arnell & Jillian La Valette	England
1960	Walter Laird & Lorraine Reynolds	England/Sweden
1961	Jimmy Hulbert & Carol Dourof	England
1962	Walter Laird & Lorraine Reynolds	England/Sweden
1963	Walter Laird & Lorraine Reynolds	England/Sweden
1964	Robert & Marguerite O'Hara	England
1965	James Arnell & Jillian La Valette	England
1966	Robert & Marguerite O'Hara	England
1967	Robert & Marguerite O'Hara	England
1968	Robert & Marguerite O'Hara	England
1969	Robert & Marguerite O'Hara	England
1970	Michael Stylianos & Lorna Lee	England
1971	Michael Stylianos & Lorna Lee	England
1972	Michael Stylianos & Lorna Lee	England
1973	Michael Stylianos & Lorna Lee	England
1974	Michael Stylianos & Lorna Lee	England
1975	Alan & Hazel Fletcher	England
1976	Alan & Hazel Fletcher	England
1977	Alan & Hazel Fletcher	England
1978	Peter Maxwell & Lynn Harman	England
1979	Alan & Hazel Fletcher	England
1980	Alan & Hazel Fletcher	England
1981	Espen & Kirsten Salberg	Norway
1982	Espen & Kirsten Salberg	Norway
1983	Sammy & Shirley Stopford	England
1984	Donnie Burns & Gaynor Fairweather	Scotland/England
1985	Donnie Burns & Gaynor Fairweather	Scotland/England
1986	Donnie Burns & Gaynor Fairweather	Scotland/England
1987	Donnie Burns & Gaynor Fairweather	Scotland/England
1988	Donnie Burns & Gaynor Fairweather	Scotland/England
1989	Donnie Burns & Gaynor Fairweather	Scotland/England
1990	Donnie Burns & Gaynor Fairweather	Scotland/England
1991	Donnie Burns & Gaynor Fairweather	Scotland/England
1992	Donnie Burns & Gaynor Fairweather	Scotland/England
1993	Sammy Stopford & Barbara McColl	England
1994	Donnie Burns & Gaynor Fairweather	Scotland/England
1995	Corky & Shirley Ballas	U.S.A./England
1996	Donnie Burns & Gaynor Fairweather	Scotland/England
1997	Jukka Haapalainen & Sirpa Suutari	Finland
1998	Bryan Watson & Karen Hardy	South Africa/England
1999	Jukka Haapalainen & Sirpa Suutari	Finland
2000	Bryan Watson & Carmen Vincelj	South Africa/Germany
2001	Bryan Watson & Carmen Vincelj	South Africa/Germany
2002	Bryan Watson & Carmen Vincelj	South Africa/Germany
2003	Bryan Watson & Carmen Vincelj	South Africa/Germany
2004	Bryan Watson & Carmen Vincelj	South Africa/Germany
2005	Bryan Watson & Carmen Vincelj	South Africa/Germany
2006	Bryan Watson & Carmen Vincelj	South Africa/Germany
2007	Bryan Watson & Carmen Vincelj	South Africa/Germany
2008	Michael Malitowski & Joanna Leunis	Poland/Belgium
2009	Michael Malitowski & Joanna Leunis	Poland/Belgium
2010	Michael Malitowski & Joanna Leunis	England
2011	Michael Malitowski & Joanna Leunis	England
2012	Riccardo Cocchi & Yulia Zagoruychenko	U.S.A.
2013	Michael Malitowski & Joanna Leunis	England
2014	Michael Malitowski & Joanna Leunis	England
2015	Riccardo Cocchi & Yulia Zagoruychenko	U.S.A.
2016	Riccardo Cocchi & Yulia Zagoruychenko	U.S.A.
2017	Riccardo Cocchi & Yulia Zagoruychenko	U.S.A.
2018	Riccardo Cocchi & Yulia Zagoruychenko	U.S.A.
2019	Riccardo Cocchi & Yulia Zagoruychenko	U.S.A.
2020	not held due to COVID-19	
2021	Troels Bager & Ina Ivanova-Jeliazkova	U.S.A.
2022	Troels Bager & Ina Ivanova-Jeliazkova	U.S.A.
2023	Troels Bager & Ina Ivanova-Jeliazkova	U.S.A.

== International Amateur Champions ==
Amateur Champions
1953	James Arnell & Estrella Pescador	England/Spain
1954	tie: Derek & Rose Bassi and Teddie Atkinson & Audrey Tessier	England
1955	Derek & Rose Bassi	England
1956	James Hayes & Eileen Pollard	England
1957	James Hayes & Eileen Pollard	England
1958	James Hayes & Eileen Pollard	England
1959	Robert O'Hara & Margaret Nuthall	England
1960	Ronald Smith & Jill Stevens	England
1961	Ronald Smith & Jill Stevens	England
1962	Alan Shaw & Ann Tinkley	England
1963	John Brogan & Valerie Ritter	England
1964	Barnie Conway & Evelyn Hislop	Scotland
1965	Barnie Conway & Evelyn Hislop	Scotland
1966	Barnie Conway & Evelyn Hislop	Scotland
1967	David Douglass and Janice Barb	
1968	David Douglass and Janice Barb	
1969	Alan & Hazel Fletcher	England
1970	Keith Brewer & Shirley Wardman	England
1971	Alan & Hazel Fletcher	England
1972	Alan & Hazel Fletcher	England
1973	Peter Maxwell & Lynn Harman	England
1974	Ian & Ruth Walker	England
1975	Espen & Kirsten Salberg	Norway
1976	see http://www.dancesportinfo.net	-
1977	see http://www.dancesportinfo.net	-
1978	see http://www.dancesportinfo.net	-
1979	see http://www.dancesportinfo.net	-
1980	see http://www.dancesportinfo.net	-
1981	see http://www.dancesportinfo.net	-
1982	see http://www.dancesportinfo.net	-
1983	see http://www.dancesportinfo.net	-
1984	see http://www.dancesportinfo.net	-
1985	see http://www.dancesportinfo.net	-
1986	see http://www.dancesportinfo.net	-
1987	see http://www.dancesportinfo.net	-
1988	see http://www.dancesportinfo.net	-
1989	see http://www.dancesportinfo.net	-
1990	see http://www.dancesportinfo.net	-
1991	see http://www.dancesportinfo.net	-
1992	see http://www.dancesportinfo.net	-
1993	see http://www.dancesportinfo.net	-
1994	see http://www.dancesportinfo.net	-
1995	Louis Van Amstel & Julie Fryer	Netherlands
1996	Ralf Müller & Olga Müller-Omeltchenko	Germany
1997	Michael Wentink & Beata Onefater	South Africa
1998	Michael Wentink & Beata Onefater	South Africa
1999	Matthew Cutler & Nicole Cutler	England
2000	Slavik Kryklyvyy & Joanna Leunis	Belgium
2001	Andrej Škufca & Katarina Venturini	Slovenia
2002	Franco Formica & Oksana Nikiforova	Germany
2003	Franco Formica & Oksana Nikiforova	Germany
2004	Riccardo Cocchi & Joanne Wilkinson	USA
2005	Riccardo Cocchi & Joanne Wilkinson	Italy
2006	Peter Stokkebroe & Kristina Stokkebroe	Denmark
2007	Maurizio Vescovo & Melinda Törökgyörgy	Hungary
2008	Stefano Di Filippo & Anna Melnikova	Italy
2009	Alexei Silde & Anna Firstova	Russia
2010	Zoran Plohl & Tatsiana Lahvinovich	Croatia
2011	Neil Jones & Ekaterina Sokolova	England
2012	Neil Jones & Ekaterina Sokolova	England
2013	Troels Bager & Ina Jeliazkova	Denmark
2014	Troels Bager & Ina Jeliazkova	Denmark
2015	Nikita Brovko & Olga Urumova	Russia
2016	Morten Lowe & Roselina Doneva	Denmark
2017	Ferdinando Iannaconne & Yulia Musikhina-Iannaconne	Italy
2018	Ferdinando Iannaconne & Yulia Musikhina-Iannaconne	Italy
2019	Ferdinando Iannaconne & Yulia Musikhina-Iannaconne	Italy
2020	not held due COVID-19	
2021	Klemen Presnikar & Alexandra Averkieva	Slovenia
2022	Petar Daskalov & Zia James	England
2023	Petar Daskalov & Zia James	England
