= Maksim Chmerkovskiy =

Ukrainian-American dancer (born 1980)

- Максим Чмерковський
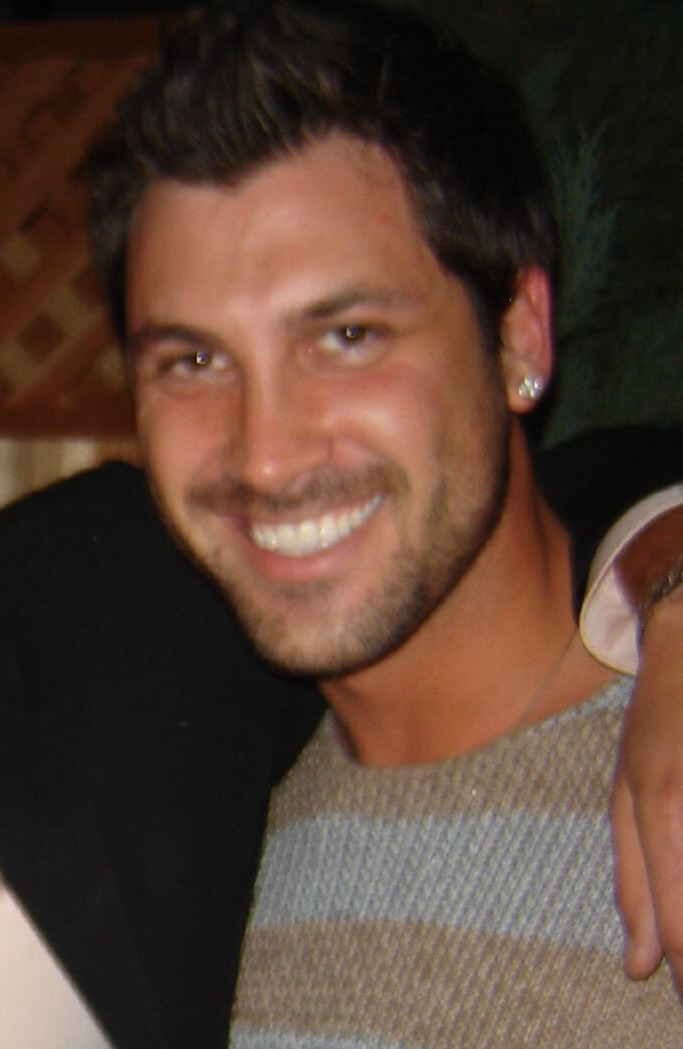
- Chmerkovskiy in 2007
- Born: Maksim Aleksandrovich Chmerkovskiy; January 17, 1980 (age 46); Odessa, Ukrainian SSR, Soviet Union
- Occupations: Dancer; choreographer; instructor
- Spouse: Peta Murgatroyd (m. 2017)
- Children: 3
- Relatives: Valentin Chmerkovskiy (brother); Jenna Johnson (sister-in-law)
- Website: maksimchmerkovskiy.com

Maksim Aleksandrovich Chmerkovskiy (Note: Ukrainian: Максим Олександрович Чмерковський, romanized: Maksym Oleksandrovych Chmerkovskyi [mɐkˈsɪm olekˈsɑndrowɪtʃ ˈtʃmɛrkou̯sʲkɪj]) (born January 17, 1980) is a Ukrainian-American Latin–ballroom dance champion, choreographer, and instructor. He is widely known as one of the professional dancers on the American television series Dancing with the Stars, on which he first appeared in season two. In his 17 seasons as a competing pro on the show, Chmerkovskiy made it to the final round five times, with two runner-up and two third-place finishes. On May 20, 2014, Chmerkovskiy, paired with Olympic ice dancer Meryl Davis, won his first Dancing with the Stars title. Chmerkovskiy has also starred in the Broadway productions of dance shows Burn the Floor and Forever Tango.

== Early life ==
Maksim Aleksandrovich Chmerkovskiy was born on January 17, 1980, in the Ukrainian port city of Odessa. At the time, Ukraine, known by the Ukrainian Soviet Socialist Republic, was a constituent republic of the Soviet Union. His mother, Larisa Chmerkovskaya, is Christian, and his father, Aleksandr "Sasha" Chmerkovskiy, is Jewish; Chmerkovskiy has described himself as Jewish. He has a younger brother, Valentin Chmerkovskiy (born 1986), who is also a professional dancer.

Chmerkovskiy began dancing at the age of four when his parents enrolled him in a school of aesthetic education. The aim of the school was to train children to become young gentlemen or ladies, and the education included manners and ballroom dance. He eventually began competing in ten-dance, which includes both ballroom and Latin dances. As a child, Chmerkovskiy also participated in tennis, soccer, and swimming.

At age 13, he broke his right leg in a skiing accident and had a titanium rod put in to stabilize his leg. Doctors foresaw long-term difficulties and little possibility of a dancing career; however, he recovered and was dancing again six months later.

The family immigrated to Brooklyn, New York, in 1994. The challenges of immigration for Chmerkovskiy and his family included financial and language barriers. On his second day in the United States, Chmerkovskiy had a new pair of roller blades stolen. Moving to the United States also gave Chmerkovskiy the opportunity to rededicate himself to dance. At 15 he began working at a local Russian restaurant, dancing as entertainment. Working at the restaurant, Chmerkovskiy decided winning competitions as a dancer would be a way to argue for higher pay.

== Competitive dancing ==
As a dancer, Chmerkovskiy competed at the professional level in the International Latin category. With partner Elena Grinenko, with whom Chmerkovskiy competed from 2002 to 2005, Chmerkovskiy achieved the rank of 2nd in the United States and 7th in the world among professional international Latin couples.

=== Dancing titles ===
- 2005 Yankee Classic Professional Latin Champion
- 2005 Blackpool Dance Festival Semi-Finalist
- 2004 Manhattan Dancesport Professional Latin Champion
- 2004 Nevada Star Ball Champion
- 2004 World Masters Finalist
- 2004 Moscow Kremlin Cup Finalist
- 2004 Philadelphia Dancesport Festival Champion
- 2003 All England Champion
- 2003 Ohio Star Ball Latin Champion
- 2003 La Classique du Quebec Champion

=== Opening dance studios ===
At age 16, Chmerkovskiy and his father opened a youth-oriented competitive dance studio, Rising Stars Dance Academy, on the second floor of a building his father owned in Ridgewood, New Jersey. Chmerkovskiy said he chose New Jersey because there was a plethora of dance studios that he disliked already established in Brooklyn. The studio relocated a few times until it ended up in Saddle Brook, New Jersey. He said in 2011 of choosing a New Jersey location, "I didn't want to open a studio that would become just one of the studios in the area. I wanted to open my studio somewhere where there was nothing like it and where people would look at it with no preconceived notions."

In 2001, Chmerkovskiy had his first major success as an instructor when he helped his brother, Valentin, then 16, and Diana Olonetskaya, 15—became the first U.S. dance pair to win a world junior championship. Chmerkovskiy also taught dancers Serge Onik and Kiki Nyemchek, both of whom competed on So You Think You Can Dance, finishing in the top fourteen in season 11 and fourth in season 14, respectively.

In addition to Rising Stars, Chmerkovskiy owns several social and competitive dance studios under the brand "Dance With Me." Most are in the New York metropolitan area.

== Dancing with the Stars ==
=== Pro dancer ===
Chmerkovskiy competed as a professional dancer on Dancing with the Stars for fifteen seasons. He was often referred to as "the bad boy of the ballroom."

==== Seasons 2–6 ====
Chmerkovskiy first appeared in the second season of the ABC series Dancing with the Stars partnered with actress Tia Carrere. The pair's most successful dance was their tango. They finished in sixth place. The following season, he and partner singer Willa Ford came in seventh place. Chmerkovskiy returned to Dancing with the Stars in March 2007 for Season 4, this time partnered with boxer Laila Ali. They made it to the finals and finished in third place. In Season 5 of Dancing with the Stars, he was partnered with Melanie Brown and the couple received second place. Following the season 5 finale, Chmerkovskiy reportedly told TV Guide Magazine he would not be returning to the show, something he later told People Magazine he had announced his departure because of stress. Chmerkovskiy did not compete in Season 6, although he and former partner Melanie Brown made an appearance for the 100th episode.

==== Seasons 7–9 ====
He returned for the show's seventh season, this time paired with two-time Olympic volleyball gold medalist, Misty May-Treanor. Chmerkovskiy and May-Treanor were forced to withdraw from the competition in Week 3. During a practice for their jive, May-Treanor ruptured her Achilles tendon and required surgery. Her withdrawal gave them a finish in 10th place.

On February 9, 2009, Good Morning America announced that he would be paired with Denise Richards for the eighth season of Dancing with the Stars. They were eliminated second in the competition, giving the pair a finish of 12th place. In the ninth season, he was paired with actress Debi Mazar, during which they were eliminated fourth. Halfway through season 9, Chmerkovskiy partnered Joanna Krupa for one week while Derek Hough was ill. Krupa and Chmerkovskiy danced an Argentine Tango and participated in the '70s themed group dance.

==== Seasons 10–13 ====
In season 10, Chmerkovskiy, returning for his eighth season, was partnered with Erin Andrews. Andrews and Chmerkovskiy's partnership was notable for their good rapport and Chmerkovskiy was protective of Andrews as she coped with threats. They ended up coming in third place during the two-hour finale on May 25, 2010.

For season 11, Chmerkovskiy partnered with singer and actress, Brandy. They made it to the semi-finals but were eliminated with a fourth-place finish. Their elimination was viewed as shocking because they were consistently among the highest scoring couples each week.

For Season 12, he was paired with actress Kirstie Alley. On week 3, his leg gave out causing her to fall heavily on him, earning 21 points (out of 30). The next week, Alley's shoe fell off during their routine. Judge Carrie Ann Inaba called Alley "The Queen of the Unexpected Mishap." In April the show aired a rehearsal outtake of Chmerkovskiy giving a monologue which resulted in him often being referred to as "sex on a stick."

For season 13, Chmerkovskiy was partnered with Hope Solo and they finished in fourth place. He faced controversy for his comments aimed at Judge Len Goodman who described his and Solo's rumba as the "worst dance of the season". Chmerkovskiy attacked Goodman, suggesting that, "maybe it’s time" for Goodman to leave the business after 50 years. Carrie Ann Inaba called him out on the spot for being disrespectful. He responded by saying "With all due respect, this is my show". He later doubled down saying, "Don’t tell me it was your worst dance of the season because you’re an idiot, you know it’s not true". On ABC News with Robin Roberts Chmerkovskiy defended his comments adding "I have nothing to apologize for to Len, certainly not to Carrie Ann". In Solo's 2012 autobiography, Solo: A Memoir of Hope, she alleged Cherkovskiy "manhandled me in rehearsals from the start, pushing me, whacking my stomach, bending my arms roughly" adding "Maks was rough and mean with me, flinging me and pushing me around." He has denied the allegations.

==== Seasons 14–18 ====
For season 14, he was partnered with actress Melissa Gilbert. In week 4, while performing the paso doble, Gilbert hit her head on the dance floor and suffered a mild concussion. She was rushed to the hospital and was unable to be at the results show the following night. The couple was called safe. Chmerkovskiy also suffered an injury, pulling a muscle in his shoulder. The couple was eliminated four weeks later, finishing in fifth place.

For season 15, an All-Stars season, Maksim returned to the dance floor with previous partner, Kirstie Alley. In week 1, they received the second-lowest score, 19. In week 3, Alley and Chmerkovskiy danced a Cha-Cha-Cha, they scored 17 . Alley and Chmerkovskiy earned 24. Alley and Chmerkovskiy were eliminated in week 8 alongside Gilles Marini and Peta Murgatroyd in a double elimination.

In February 2013, Chmerkovskiy announced his departure from Dancing with the Stars for Season 16. Chmerkovskiy returned on the fifth week of Season 16 for "Len's Side-By-Side Challenge", where he danced with Anna Trebunskaya in an Argentine Tango with brother Val and his partner Zendaya and in a Jive with Jacoby Jones and his partner Karina Smirnoff.

Prior to the full cast announcement, US Weekly reported Chmerkovskiy would return to Dancing for season 18 after a two-season break. Chmerkovskiy was paired with Olympic ice dancer Meryl Davis. They were announced the winners on May 20, 2014, marking Chmerkovskiy's first win. At the end of Season 18, they had the highest average of any dancers of the show with a 28.4 average, and were tied for the most perfect scores, earning a total of six.

==== Seasons 23–26 ====
On August 25, 2016, following the circulation of a reportedly new photo of Chmerkovskiy in costume for DWTS, Chmerkovskiy confirmed his return to the show in an appearance on Good Morning America. Season 23 was Chmerkovskiy's first as a competing pro since winning the competition in season 18. The full cast was officially announced on August 30, at which point ABC confirmed Chmerkovskiy was partnered with model Amber Rose. They were eliminated on week 6 of the competition, finishing in 9th place.

After his season 23 elimination, Chmerkovskiy said he did not plan to return for season 24. Nevertheless, in February 2017, Chmerkovskiy and his fiancée Peta Murgatroyd announced they both would return as professionals. He was partnered with actress Heather Morris. Chmerkovskiy however, missed 4 weeks of competition due to an injury. Morris and Chmerkovskiy were eliminated on week 6 after receiving a perfect 40 and finished in 8th place. Chmerkovskiy returned for season 25, and was paired with television personality Vanessa Lachey. They were eliminated on week 7 of the competition, in a double elimination and finished in seventh place. On April 5, 2018, Chmerkovskiy announced in an interview that he was officially done as a DWTS pro.

=== Results ===
Season	Partner	Place	Average
2	Tia Carrere	6th	23.0
3	Willa Ford	7th	24.4
4	Laila Ali	3rd	27.0
5	Melanie Brown	2nd	27.6
7	Misty May-Treanor	10th	21.0
8	Denise Richards	12th	18.3
9	Debi Mazar	12th	18.0
10	Erin Andrews	3rd	24.6
11	Brandy Norwood	4th	26.0
12	Kirstie Alley	2nd	24.7
13	Hope Solo	4th	23.3
14	Melissa Gilbert	5th	22.9
15	Kirstie Alley	7th	24.2
18	Meryl Davis	1st	28.4
23	Amber Rose	9th	20.6
24	Heather Morris	8th	25.0
25	Vanessa Lachey	7th	24.4

=== Guest judge ===
For season 17, he was a guest judge during the semifinals in Week 10. Chmerkovskiy returned to the ballroom as a guest judge during Week 5 of Season 21. Chmerkovskiy again returned to the judge's desk in Week 5 of Season 22, switch-up week. Chmerkovskiy's fiancée, Peta Murgatroyd, was among the competing pros that week. She won that season with model Nyle DiMarco.

== Dancing with the Stars performances ==
=== Season 2 ===
- With celebrity partner: Tia Carrere (Average – 23.0) (Placed: 6th)

Week #	Dance/Song	Judges' score			Total	Result
Week #	Dance/Song	Inaba	Goodman	Tonioli	Total	Result
1	Waltz / "What a Wonderful World"	6	7	7	20	Bottom Two
2	Rumba / "Emotion"	7	8	7	22	Safe
3	Tango / "Por Una Cabeza"	9	8	9	26	Safe
4	Foxtrot / "Dream a Little Dream of Me"	9	8	8	25	Bottom Two
5	Samba / "No More Tears (Enough Is Enough)"	7	7	8	22	Eliminated

=== Season 3 ===
- With celebrity partner: Willa Ford (Average – 24.4) (Placed: 7th)

Week #	Dance/Song	Judges' score			Total	Result
Week #	Dance/Song	Inaba	Goodman	Tonioli	Total	Result
1	Foxtrot / "True"	7	7	8	22	Bottom three
2	Mambo / "Get Busy"	7	8	8	23	Bottom Two
3	Jive / "SOS"	7	7	8	22	Safe
4	Waltz / "You Light Up My Life"	9	9	10	28	Safe
5	Rumba / "Every Breath You Take"	9	9	9	27	Eliminated

=== Season 4 ===
- With celebrity partner: Laila Ali (Average – 27.0) (Placed: 3rd)

Week #	Dance/Song	Judges' score			Total	Result
Week #	Dance/Song	Inaba	Goodman	Tonioli	Total	Result
1	Foxtrot / "How Sweet It Is (To Be Loved by You)"	7	8	8	23	No Elimination
2	Mambo / "Maracaibo Oriental"	9	9	9	27	Safe
3	Tango / "Goldfinger"	7	7	7	21	Safe
4	Paso Doble / "Les Toreadors"	7	7	7	21	Safe
5	Rumba / "Put Your Records On"	9	10	9	28	Safe
6	Cha-Cha-Cha / "Hold on, I'm Comin'"	9	9	10	28	Safe
7	Quickstep / "Part-Time Lover"	10	9	10	59 (29 + 30)	Safe
7	Samba / "Brazil"	10	10	10	59 (29 + 30)	Safe
8	Waltz / "May Each Day"	9	9	9	53 (27 + 26)	Safe
8	Jive / "Bad, Bad Leroy Brown"	9	8	9	53 (27 + 26)	Safe
9 Semi-finals	Quickstep / "Walk Like an Egyptian"	10	10	10	60 (30 + 30)	Safe
9 Semi-finals	Cha-Cha-Cha / "She's a Lady"	10	10	10	60 (30 + 30)	Safe
10; Finals	Paso Doble / "España Cani"	10	9	10	85 (29 + 26 + 30)	Third Place
10; Finals	Freestyle / "Shake Your Body (Down to the Ground)"; Mambo / "Maracaibo Oriental"	9	8	9	85 (29 + 26 + 30)	Third Place
10; Finals	Freestyle / "Shake Your Body (Down to the Ground)"; Mambo / "Maracaibo Oriental"	10	10	10	85 (29 + 26 + 30)	Third Place

=== Season 5 ===
- With celebrity partner: Mel B (Average – 27.6) (Placed: 2nd)

Week #	Dance/Song	Judges' score			Total	Result
Week #	Dance/Song	Inaba	Goodman	Tonioli	Total	Result
1	Cha-Cha-Cha / "A Deeper Love"	8	8	8	24	Safe
2	Quickstep / "Take On Me"	7	8	8	23	Safe
3	Jive / "Sweet Soul Music"	9	9	9	27	Safe
4	Viennese Waltz / "Breakaway"	8	9	9	26	Bottom Two
5	Samba / "Spice Up Your Life"	10	9	10	29	Safe
6	Rumba / "A Woman's Worth"	10	10	10	30	Safe
7	Foxtrot / "Jimmy Mack"	8	8	8	54 (24 + 30)	Safe
7	Paso Doble / "Free Your Mind"	10	10	10	54 (24 + 30)	Safe
8	Tango / "Personal Jesus"	9	9	9	56 (27 + 29)	Safe
8	Mambo / "Mambo Jambo"	9	10	10	56 (27 + 29)	Safe
9 Semi-finals	Viennese Waltz / "Somebody to Love"	10	10	10	60 (30 + 30)	Safe
9 Semi-finals	Paso Doble / "(I Can't Get No) Satisfaction"	10	10	10	60 (30 + 30)	Safe
10; Finals	Cha-Cha-Cha / "Car Wash"	9	9	10	85 (28 + 27 + 30)	Second Place
10; Finals	Freestyle / "The Way I Are"	9	9	9	85 (28 + 27 + 30)	Second Place
10; Finals	Mambo / "Mambo Jambo"	10	10	10	85 (28 + 27 + 30)	Second Place

=== Season 7 ===
- With celebrity partner: Misty May-Treanor (Average – 21.0) (Placed: 10th)

Week #	Dance / Song	Judges' scores			Result
Week #	Dance / Song	Inaba	Goodman	Tonioli	Result
1	Foxtrot / "This Will Be (An Everlasting Love)"; Mambo / "Black Mambo"	6; 7	8; 7	7; 7	Safe
2	Paso Doble / "Take Me Out"	7	7	7	Safe
3	Jive / "Shake It"	Suffered injury			Withdrew

- Season 8 – With celebrity partner: Denise Richards (Average – 18.3) (Placed: 12th)

Week #	Dance / Song	Judges' scores			Result
Week #	Dance / Song	Inaba	Goodman	Tonioli	Result
1	Cha-Cha-Cha / "Nothin' but a Good Time"	6	6	6	No Elimination
2	Quickstep / "We Go Together"	7	7	7	Safe
3	Samba / "Take a Picture"	5	6	5	Eliminated

- Season 9 – With celebrity partner: Debi Mazar (Average – 18.0) (Placed: 12th)

Week #	Dance / Song	Judges' scores			Result
Week #	Dance / Song	Inaba	Goodman	Tonioli	Result
1	Salsa / "Complicacion"; Foxtrot Relay / "The Best is Yet to Come"	6 Awarded	5; 6	5 Points	Safe
2	Tango / "El Tango de Roxanne"	7	7^{1}	7	Bottom Two
3	Samba / "Love Is in the Air"	6	5	6	Eliminated
^{1}Score by guest judge Baz Luhrmann.

- Season 10 – With celebrity partner: Erin Andrews (Average – 24.6) (Placed: 3rd)

Week #	Dance / Song	Judges' scores			Result
Week #	Dance / Song	Inaba	Goodman	Tonioli	Result
1	Cha-Cha-Cha / "Tik Tok"	7	7	7	No Elimination
2	Foxtrot / "Love Story"	8	7	8	Safe
3	Waltz / "See the Day"	8	7	8	Safe
4	Tango / "Sweet Dreams (Are Made of This)"	6; 7	6; 7	6; 7	Safe
5	Jive / "You Never Can Tell"	7	7	8	Safe
6	Samba / "When I Get You Alone"; Swing Marathon / "In the Mood"	9 Awarded	7; 9	9 Points	Safe
7	Team Cha-Cha-Cha / "Holiday"; Quickstep / "Dancin' Fool"	8; 9	8; 9	8; 9	Bottom Two
8	Argentine Tango / "Una Musica Brutal"; Rumba / "Missing You"	9; 8	10; 8	9; 9	Safe
9 Semi-finals	Viennese Waltz / "February Song"; Paso Doble / "U Got the Look"	9; 10	9; 9	9; 10	Last to Be Called Safe
10; Finals	Samba / "Mi Swing Es Tropical"; Freestyle / "Alone"; Argentine Tango / "Una Musica Brutal"	10; 9; 8	10; 8; 9	9; 9; 9	Third Place

- Season 11 – With celebrity partner: Brandy (Average – 26.0) (Placed: 4th)

Week #	Dance / Song	Judges' scores			Result
Week #	Dance / Song	Inaba	Goodman	Tonioli	Result
1	Viennese Waltz / "Cry Me Out"	7	8	8	Safe
2	Jive / "Magic"	7	7	7	Safe
3	Samba / "Put It in a Love Song"	8	8	8	Safe
4	Rumba / "This Woman's Work"	8; 8	8; 8	7; 9	Safe
5	Quickstep / "I'll Be There for You"	9	9	9	Safe
6	Tango / "Holding Out for a Hero"; Rock N' Roll Marathon / "La Grange"	8 Awarded	9; 10	9 Points	Safe
7	Team Cha-Cha-Cha / "Bust A Move"; Foxtrot / "Fever"	9; 9^{1} / 9	9; 10	9; 9	Safe
8	Waltz / "Dark Waltz"; Cha-Cha-Cha / "Teenage Dream"	9; 9	10; 9	10; 10	Last to be Called Safe
9 Semi-finals	Paso Doble / "Firework"; Argentine Tango / "Taquito Militar"	9; 10	9; 10	9; 10	Eliminated
^{1}Score by guest judge Gilles Marini.

- Season 12 – With celebrity partner: Kirstie Alley (Average – 24.6) (Placed: 2nd)

Week #	Dance / Song	Judges' scores			Result
Week #	Dance / Song	Inaba	Goodman	Tonioli	Result
1	Cha-Cha-Cha / "Forget You"	8	7	8	No Elimination
2	Quickstep / "Black Horse and the Cherry Tree"	7	6	7	Safe
3	Rumba / "Over the Rainbow"	7	7	7	Safe
4	Waltz / "The Flower Duet"	7	7	8	Safe
5	Foxtrot / "American Woman"	8	7	8	Safe
6	Samba / "Baby One More Time"	8	9	9	Safe
7	Team Cha-Cha-Cha / "We R Who We R"; Jive / "La Bamba"	7^{1} / 7; 9 / 7	8; 6	8; 8	Safe
8	Argentine Tango / "Cite Tango"; Salsa / "Cobrastyle"	9; 8	9; 9	10; 8	Safe
9 Semi-finals	Viennese Waltz / "One and Only"; Paso Doble / "White Room"; Winner Take All Cha-Cha-Cha / "Walkin' on the Sun"	9; 9 Lost	9; 9 This	9; 9 Event	Last to Be Called Safe
10; Finals	Samba / "Magalenha"; Freestyle / "Perfect"; Cha-Cha-Cha / "Forget You"	9; 9; 10	9; 9; 10	9; 9; 10	Runner Up
^{1}Score by guest judge Donnie Burns.

- Season 13 – With celebrity partner: Hope Solo (Average – 23.3) (Placed: 4th)

Week #	Dance / Song	Judges' scores			Result
Week #	Dance / Song	Inaba	Goodman	Tonioli	Result
1	Viennese Waltz / "Satellite"	7	7	7	Safe
2	Jive / "Girlfriend"	6	7	6	Safe
3	Cha-Cha-Cha / "Tonight I'm Lovin' You"	8	8	8	Last to Be Called Safe
4	Foxtrot / "You've Got a Friend in Me"	8	8	8	Safe
5	Tango / "Livin' on a Prayer"	8	8	8	Last to Be Called Safe
6	Rumba / "Seasons of Love"	7	6	7	Last to Be Called Safe
7	Samba / "Werewolves of London"; Team Paso Doble / "Bring Me to Life"	8; 9	8; 8	8; 9	Safe
8	Quickstep / "Valerie"; Instant Jive / "The Best Damn Thing"	9; 8	9; 9	9; 8	Safe
9 Semi-finals	Paso Doble / "Can't Be Tamed"; Argentine Tango / "Whatever Lola Wants"; Cha-Cha-Cha Relay / "I Like How It Feels"	7; 8 Awarded	7; 8; 4	7; 8 Points	Eliminated

- Season 14 – With celebrity partner: Melissa Gilbert (Average – 22.9) (Placed: 5th)

Week #	Dance / Song	Judges' scores			Result
Week #	Dance / Song	Inaba	Goodman	Tonioli	Result
1	Cha-Cha-Cha / "Ain't No Mountain High Enough"	7	6	7	No Elimination
2	Quickstep / "Dancing with Myself"	7	6	7	Safe
3	Jive / "Dog Days Are Over"	8	8	8	Safe
4	Paso Doble / "Conquest"	7	8	7	Safe
5	Salsa / "Aguanile"	7	7	7	Safe
6	Viennese Waltz / "Ooh Baby Baby"; Motown Marathon / "Nowhere to Run"	8 Awarded	8; 6	8 Points	Safe
7	Argentine Tango / "Marriage of Figaro"; Team Paso Doble / "O Fortuna"	7; 9	7; 8	7; 9	Safe
8	Foxtrot / "Maggie May"; Samba (Trio Challenge) / "Hard to Handle"	8; 9	8; 9	8; 9	Eliminated

- Season 15 – With celebrity partner: Kirstie Alley (Average – 24.2) (Placed: 7th)

Week #	Dance / Song	Judges' scores			Result
Week #	Dance / Song	Inaba	Goodman	Tonioli	Result
1	Foxtrot / "Set Fire to the Rain"	6.5	6	6.5	Safe
2	Jive / "Non Non Rien N'a Changé"	7	7	7	Safe
3	Cha-Cha-Cha / "Moves like Jagger"	8	8	8	Safe
4	Charleston / "42nd Street"	7.5	7.5	7.5^{1} / 7.5	Bottom Two
5	Quickstep / "Mrs. Robinson"; Team Freestyle / "Gangnam Style"	8.5; 9	8.5; 9	8.5; 9	No Elimination
6	Rumba / "Home"; Group Country Western / "Save a Horse (Ride a Cowboy)" & "I Play Chicken with a Train"	9.5; Awarded	8.5; 2	9.5; Points	Safe
7	Quickstep & Samba / "Sir Duke"; Swing Marathon / "Do Your Thing"	8 Awarded	8; 4	8 Points	No Elimination
8	Viennese Waltz / "Hallelujah"; Paso Doble (Trio Challenge) / "Bring Me to Life"	9; 8	9; 8	9; 8	Eliminated
^{1}Score by guest judge Paula Abdul.

- Season 18 – With celebrity partner: Meryl Davis (Average – 28.4) (Placed: 1st)

Week #	Dance / Song	Judges' scores			Result
Week #	Dance / Song	Inaba	Goodman	Tonioli	Result
1	Cha-cha-cha / "All Night"	8	8	8	No Elimination
2	Swing / "Big and Bad"	8	9	8	Safe
3	Foxtrot / "All of Me"	10	9 / 10^{1}	10	Safe
4^{2}	Argentine Tango / "Too Close"	10	9 / 10^{3}	10	No Elimination
5	Samba / "I Wan'na Be Like You (The Monkey Song)"	9	9 / 9^{4}	9	Safe
6	Tango / "Feel So Close"	10	10^{5} / 10	10	Safe
7	Salsa / "Adrenalina"; Team Freestyle / "Livin' la Vida Loca"	10; 10	10^{6} / 9; 10 / 9	10; 10	Safe
8	Rumba / "Read All About It (Pt. III)"; Celebrity Dance Duel (Samba) / "I Luh Ya Papi"	9; 8	9 / 8^{7} 9 / 8	10; 9	Safe
9 Semi-Finals	Jive / "Hound Dog"; Viennese Waltz / "Just a Fool"	10; 10	10 / 10^{8} 10 / 10	10; 10	Last to Be Called Safe
10; Finals	Argentine Tango / "Montserrat"; Freestyle / "Latch"; Foxtrot & Cha-cha-cha Fusion / "Glowing"	10; 10; 10	10; 10; 10	10; 10; 10	WON
^{1}Score from guest judge Robin Roberts^{2}For this week only, as part of the "Partner Switch-Up", Davis did not perform with Maksim Chmerkovskiy and instead performed with Valentin Chmerkovskiy.^{3}Score from guest judge Julianne Hough.^{4}Score from guest judge Donny Osmond.^{5}Score from guest judge Redfoo.^{6}Scores from guest judge Ricky Martin.^{7}Scores from guest judge Abby Lee Miller.^{8}Scores from guest judge Kenny Ortega.

- Season 23 – With celebrity partner: Amber Rose (Average – 28.4) (Placed: 9th)

Week #	Dance / Song	Judges' scores				Result
Week #	Dance / Song	Inaba	Goodman	Hough	Tonioli	Result
1	Foxtrot / "Here"	6	6	6	6	No Elimination
2	Viennese Waltz / "Game of Thrones Theme"	6	6	6	6	Safe
3	Salsa / "Booty"	7	6	6	6	Last to Be Called Safe
4	Argentine Tango / "Two Two Tango"	8	–	8	8	Safe
5	Samba / "Woman Up"	8	–	8	8	No Elimination
6	Cha-cha-cha / "Bla Bla Bla Cha Cha Cha"	7	7^{1}	7	7	Eliminated
^{1}Score from guest judge Pitbull.

- Season 24 – With celebrity partner: Heather Morris (Average – 33.4) (Placed: 8th)

Week #	Dance / Song	Judges' scores				Result
Week #	Dance / Song	Inaba	Goodman	Hough	Tonioli	Result
1	Viennese Waltz / "Make Something Beautiful"	7	6	7	7	No Elimination
2^{1}	Jive / "Grown"	8	7	8	8	Safe
3	Tango / "Toxic"	9	8	8	8	Safe
4	Cha-cha-cha / "Shut Up and Dance"	8	9	9	9	Safe
5	Jazz / "For the First Time in Forever"	8	8	9	9	Safe
6	Rumba / "Waterfalls"; Team Freestyle / "My Boyfriend's Back", "No Scrubs" & "Boss"	10; 8	10; 8	10^{2} 9	10; 9	Eliminated
^{1}Chmerkovskiy was injured from weeks 2 to 5, so Alan Bersten performed with Morris instead.^{2}Scores from guest judge Nick Carter.

- Season 25 – With celebrity partner: Vanessa Lachey (Average – 24.4) (Placed: 7th)

Week #	Dance / Song	Judges' scores			Result
Week #	Dance / Song	Inaba	Goodman	Tonioli	Result
1	Cha-cha-cha / "Woman"	7	7	7	No Elimination
2	Foxtrot / "Hit Me with a Hot Note"; Salsa / "Instruction"	8; 8	8; 8	8; 7	Safe
3^{1}	Jazz / "Girls Just Wanna Have Fun"	7	8	8	Safe
4	Rumba / "Godspeed (Sweet Dreams)"	8	8	8	Safe
5	Waltz / "Un jour mon prince viendra"	8	8	8	Safe
6	Quickstep / "Let's Be Bad"	9	9	9^{2}/9	Safe
7	Paso doble / "Game of Survival"; Team Freestyle / "The Phantom of the Opera"	8; 10	8; 10	8; 10	Eliminated
^{1}Chmerkovskiy was unable to perform that week, so Alan Bersten danced with Lachey instead.^{2}Score from guest judge Shania Twain.

== Theater ==
His professional work includes choreographing for the Wynn Las Vegas's water-based show Le Rêve. By 2008, Chmerkovskiy's contribution to Le Rêve included choreographing three numbers: "Tango", "Paso Doble" and "Piece Montèe". In 2014 Chmerkovskiy returned to Le Rêve to choreograph for a new scene as part of a $3 million upgrade to the production.

Chmerkovskiy choreographed and performed in the Dancing with the Stars Tour 2008-2009 winter tour. The tour kicked off on December 17, 2008, and was scheduled to stop in 34 cities.

In the summer of 2014, Chmerkovskiy appeared in multiple performances of the touring dance show "Ballroom with a Twist."

=== Broadway ===
Chmerkovskiy was a dancer in the Broadway production Burn the Floor when it opened on July 25, 2009. Chmerkovskiy was partnered with Karina Smirnoff for the first three weeks of the show's Broadway run before both left to return to Dancing with the Stars. The pair learned their choreography for the production in just two days. Chmerkovskiy returned to Burn the Floor in November 2009 through January 2010, this time he partnered with Kym Johnson.

From July 9 to August 18, 2013, he starred in Forever Tango, a Broadway musical, dancing and performing onstage with former dance colleague Karina Smirnoff.

=== Sway: A Dance Trilogy ===
2014 was also the year when Chmerkovskiy started performing in Sway: A Dance Trilogy in Westbury, New York. Chmerkovskiy credits his father Sasha with the idea for Sway. Sway is a live ballroom dance show starring Maksim, his brother Valentin, and Tony Dovolani. The show also features other professional dancers from Dancing with the Stars, So You think You Can Dance, and dance instructors from Chmerkovskiy's Dance with Me studios. A few celebrities from Dancing with the Stars have appeared in the production as well. Sway is primarily broken into three distinct sections: a smooth, 40's nightclub inspired section featuring Dovolani, an urban and hip-hop influenced section featuring Val, and finally a more Latin and Miami oriented section featuring Maksim.

=== Maks and Val on Tour ===
On February 12, 2016, Maksim announced plans for a 45 city live tour with his younger brother, Valentin. The tour, titled Maks & Val Live On Tour: Our Way, began on June 15, 2016. The show is autobiographical and tells the story of the brothers' lives through dance.

=== Other work as choreographer ===
In addition to his choreography on Dancing with the Stars and La Reve, Chmerkovskiy has worked as a choreographer on other projects. Chmerkovskiy choreographed a commercial for Propel water. Chmerkovskiy provided choreography for Zendaya's music video for the song "Neverland" from Broadway's Finding Neverland.

== Other activities ==
Chmerkovskiy is one of the creators and directors of Dance Team USA, a nonprofit educational and charitable organization dedicated to recruiting, supporting, and training future DanceSport participants.

=== Television ===
==== In the United States ====
In 2009, he participated in the ABC sport show called The Superstars and was paired with Freestyle Skier Kristi Leskinen. They won the competition. Chmerkovskiy also appeared as himself in a 2011 episode of the short-lived CW reality show H8R. He appeared as an actor on a 2012 episode of the TV Land series The Exes. Chmerkovskiy appeared on three episodes of General Hospital in March 2013, playing the role of Anton Ivanov, who dances with Kelly Monaco's character Sam Morgan during the Nurses' Ball. In 2016, Chmerkovskiy and his brother, Valentin, both made cameo appearances in the Netflix series Fuller House, a sequel of the sitcom Full House.

In 2021, Chmerkovskiy competed on The Masked Singer spin-off The Masked Dancer as "Sloth" and finished in second place.

In September 2023, it was announced that Chmerkovskiy would be a contestant on Peacock's second season of The Traitors. The season was released in January 2024 and Chmerkovskiy finished in 18th place.

In December 2023, it was announced that Chmerkovskiy would be a judge on the 18th season of So You Think You Can Dance alongside Allison Holker and JoJo Siwa (who replaced Nigel Lythgoe after he departed before the season began).

In 2026, Chmerkovskiy was named among the most-followed duanju (vertical microdrama) actors internationally on Instagram by trade outlet Duanju News, following his role in the series Wild Silence.

==== Around the world ====
In 2011, Chmerkovskiy starred as The Bachelor in the Ukrainian version of the dating reality series. He later told a Ukrainian newspaper that he regretted doing the show, saying, "This kind of project is not for me." The show made Chmerkovskiy the second most searched person on Google in Ukraine for 2011, behind only Steve Jobs. As of 2012, he hosted the Ukrainian version of the game show The Cube.

Chmerkovskiy has also appeared as a judge on two international versions of Dancing with the Stars: India's Jhalak Dikhhla Jaa and Ukraine's Tantsi z zirkamy.

== Personal life ==
Chmerkovskiy is fluent in Russian, and understands Ukrainian. He learned how to speak English when he immigrated to Brooklyn and observed its street signs. He primarily resides in Fort Lee, New Jersey.

In 2009, Chmerkovskiy was briefly engaged to fellow Dancing with the Stars pro Karina Smirnoff. He entered a relationship with another Dancing with the Stars pro, Peta Murgatroyd, in 2012. After their initial relationship of ten months ended in 2013, Chmerkovskiy and Murgatroyd reconciled in October 2014. They became engaged on December 5, 2015, during a performance of Sway: A Dance Trilogy in Miami. Chmerkovskiy and Murgatroyd were married in a contemporary ceremony on Long Island on July 8, 2017. They have three sons together: Shai Aleksander (born January 2017), Rio John (born June 2023), and Milan Maksim (born July 2024).

In March 2022, Chmerkovskiy confirmed that he had fled from Ukraine to Poland, due to the Russian invasion of Ukraine. He also documented scenes from the invasion on social media and joined the movement "#StandWithUkraine".
