= Carmen Vincelj =

German professional dancer (born 1972)

- Born: August 1972 (age 52); Stuttgart, West Germany
- Occupation: Ballroom dancer

Carmen Vincelj (born 1972 in Stuttgart) is a German professional dancer.

Together with her partner Bryan Watson she has won the WDC World Latin Dance Championships in the professional category nine times (1999–2007), as well as 7 British Open Professional Latin American Championships (2000, 2002 - 2007) at the prestigious and most coveted Blackpool Dance Festival (a record at the time, and would be surpassed by Michael Malitowski & Joanna Leunis in 2015, after they won 8 consecutive titles) . Before partnering with Bryan Watson in 1999, Carmen was a regular Amateur finalist in all championships with her Italian partner, Sandro Cavellini. In 1996, under the training of 14 time WDC World Professional Latin American dance champion, Donnie Burns MBE, Carmen turned professional after partnering with Allan Tornsberg from Denmark. They were finalists in all major professional championships from 1996 - 1999. Today, together with her former partner Bryan and fellow World Latin American Champion, Hans Galke, she is one of the foremost and leading Latin American dance teachers and adjudicators across the globe.

== See also ==
- International Latin American Dance Champions
