= Shall We Dance? (2004 film) =

Film by Peter Chelsom

- Theatrical release poster
- Directed by: Peter Chelsom
- Screenplay by: Audrey Wells
- Based on: Shall We Dance? (1996 film) by Masayuki Suo
- Produced by: Simon Fields
- Starring: Richard Gere; Jennifer Lopez; Susan Sarandon; Stanley Tucci; Lisa Ann Walter; Richard Jenkins; Bobby Cannavale; Omar Miller; Mýa Harrison; Ja Rule; Nick Cannon
- Cinematography: John de Borman
- Edited by: Robert Leighton
- Music by: Gabriel Yared; John Altman
- Distributed by: Miramax Films
- Release date: October 15, 2004
- Running time: 106 minutes
- Country: United States
- Language: English
- Budget: $50 million
- Box office: $170.1 million

Shall We Dance? (Note: The original Japanese film had a question mark in its title, and the publicity poster for this film also includes it. However, the actual film titles on the US film appear as simply "Shall We Dance", leading to some online sources, including IMDb, referring to it without showing the question mark. The inclusion of the question mark serves to distinguish these two films from the 1937 Fred Astaire and Ginger Rogers film Shall We Dance.) is a 2004 American romantic comedy-drama film directed by Peter Chelsom and starring Richard Gere, Jennifer Lopez, and Susan Sarandon. A remake of the 1996 Japanese film of the same name, the film received mixed reviews and grossed $170.1 million worldwide.

== Plot ==
John Clark is a lawyer with a charming wife, Beverly, and a loving family, who nevertheless feels that something is missing as he makes his way every day through the city. Each evening on his commute home through Chicago, John sees a beautiful woman staring with a lost expression through the window of a dance studio. Haunted by her gaze, John impulsively jumps off the train one night, and signs up for ballroom dancing lessons, hoping to meet her.

At first, it seems like a mistake. His teacher turns out not to be the woman in the window, Paulina, but the studio's older namesake, Miss Mitzi, and John proves to be just as clumsy as his equally clueless classmates Chic and Vern on the dance-floor. Even worse, when he does meet Paulina, she icily tells John she hopes he has come to the studio to seriously study dance and not to look for a date. But, as his lessons continue, John falls in love with dancing.

Keeping his new obsession from his family and co-workers, John feverishly trains for Chicago's biggest dance competition. His friendship with Paulina blossoms, as his enthusiasm rekindles her own lost passion for dance. But the more time John spends away from home, the more his wife Beverly becomes suspicious. She hires a private investigator to find out what John is doing, but when she finds out the truth, she chooses to discontinue the investigation and not invade her husband's privacy.

John is partnered with Bobbie for the competition, although his friend Link steps in to do the Latin dances. Link and Bobbie do well in the Latin dances, and while John and Bobbie's waltz goes well, John hears his wife and daughter in the crowd during the quickstep, and is distracted by trying to find them. He and Bobbie fall and are disqualified, and he and Beverly argue in the parking garage. He then quits dancing, much to everyone's dismay.

Paulina, having been inspired by John to take up competing again, is leaving to go to Europe, and is having a going-away party at the dance studio. She sends John an invitation, but he is not convinced to go until his wife leaves out a pair of dancing shoes that she bought him. He goes and meets Beverly at work, convinces her that while he loves dancing, he still loves her just as much, and he teaches her to dance. They go to the party, and John and Paulina have one last dance before she leaves.

The end scene shows everyone afterwards: Link and Bobbie are now together; Chic, who was actually gay, dances at a club with his partner; Miss Mitzi finds a new partner, and they are happy together; John and Beverly are happier than before and dance in the kitchen; Vern, newly married to his fiancée, dances with her at their wedding; the private investigator that Beverly hired, Devine, starts up dance lessons; and Paulina, with a new partner, competes at the Blackpool Dance Festival, the competition that she had lost the year before.

== Cast ==
- Richard Gere as John Clark
- Jennifer Lopez as Paulina
- Susan Sarandon as Beverly Clark
- Lisa Ann Walter as Bobbie
- Stanley Tucci as Link Peterson
- Anita Gillette as Miss Mitzi
- Bobby Cannavale as Chic
- Omar Miller as Vern
- Tamara Hope as Jenna Clark
- Stark Sands as Evan Clark
- Richard Jenkins as Devine
- Nick Cannon as Scott Harcourt
- Diana Salvatore as Tina, Bobbie's daughter
- Sarah Lafleur as Carolyn
- Onalee Ames as Diane
- Sandra Renee Caldwell as Elise
- Karina Smirnoff as Link's Pouty Dance Partner
- Mýa Harrison as Lisa, Vern's Fiancée
- Ja Rule as Hip-Hop Bar Performer
- Tony Dovolani as Slick Willy
- Cesar Corrales as Dancer
- Slavik Kryklyvyy as Paulina's Pro Ballroom (finale)

== Soundtrack ==
1. "Sway" - The Pussycat Dolls
2. "Santa Maria" (Del Buen Ayre) - Gotan Project
3. "Happy Feet" - John Altman
4. "España cañí" - John Altman
5. "I Wanna (Shall We Dance)" - Gizelle D'Cole
6. "Perfidia" - John Altman
7. "Under The Bridges Of Paris" - John Altman
8. "Moon River" - John Altman
9. "Andalucia" - John Altman
10. "The Book Of Love" - Peter Gabriel
11. "The L Train" - Gabriel Yared
12. "I Could Have Danced All Night" - Jamie Cullum
13. "Wonderland" - Rachel Fuller
14. "Shall We Dance?" - Gotan Project
15. "Let's Dance" - Mýa

The Japanese dub uses "a love story" by Toshinobu Kubota as its theme song.

== Reception ==
=== Box office ===
The film debuted on October 15, 2004, grossing $11,783,467 in its opening weekend, placing fourth at the North American box office. Despite its 27% decline in gross earnings, it rose to the third spot the following week. The film ran for 133 days, grossing $57,890,460 in the United States and $112,238,000 internationally, for a worldwide total of $170,128,460.

=== Critical response ===
On the review aggregator website Rotten Tomatoes, the film holds an approval rating of 47% based on 156 reviews, with an average rating of 5.5/10. The website's critics consensus reads, "The cast is warmly appealing, but with the loss of cultural context and addition of big-name celebrities, this American version loses the nuances of the original." Metacritic, which uses a weighted average, assigned the film a score of 47 out of 100, based on 33 critics, indicating "mixed or average" reviews. Roger Ebert gave the film 3 out of 4 stars, stating "I enjoyed the Japanese version so much I invited it to my Overlooked Film Festival a few years ago, but this remake offers pleasures of its own."
