= Karina Smirnoff =

American professional ballroom dancer

- Карина Смирнофф
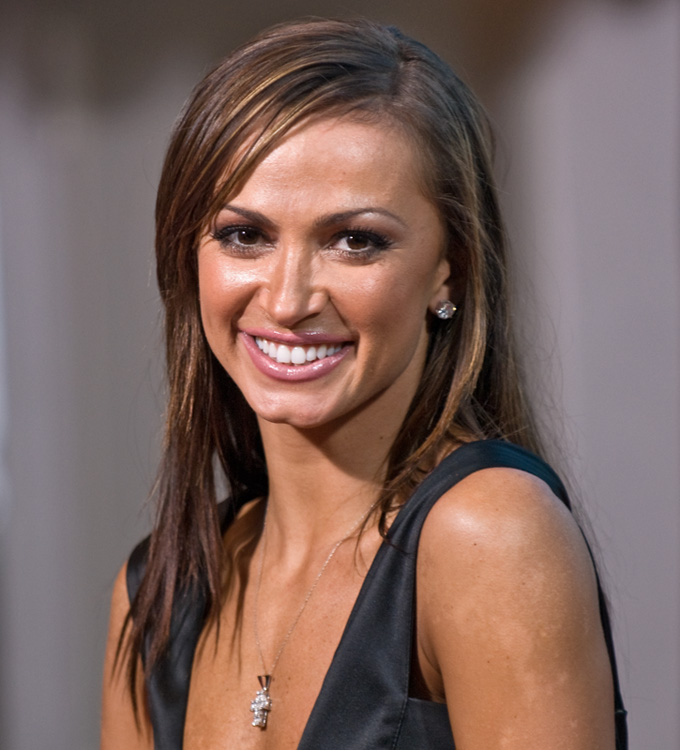
- Smirnoff in 2008
- Born: Karina Smyrnova; January 2, 1978 (age 48); Kharkiv, Ukrainian SSR, Soviet Union (now Ukraine)
- Education: Fordham University
- Occupation: Dancer
- Years active: 2004–present
- Partner: Justinas Duknauskas
- Children: 1

Karina Smirnoff (Note: Ukrainian: Карина Смирнофф, romanized: Karyna Smyrnoff) (born Karina Smyrnova (Note: Ukrainian: Карина Смирнова, romanized: Karyna Smyrnova), January 2, 1978) is a professional ballroom dancer. She is known as a professional dancer on Dancing with the Stars, where she won the thirteenth season with army veteran and soap opera star J. R. Martinez. She has also won two runner-up titles, a semifinal title, and several quarterfinal titles.

She is a five-time U.S. National Champion, World Trophy Champion, and Asian Open Champion. She has won the title at the UK Open, is a three-time champion at the US Open, two-time champion at the Asian Open, five-time champion at the Dutch Open, and five-time US National Professional Champion. She has taken second at the British Open Blackpool Dance Festival, and the first woman to reach the British Professional Final with three different partners, and surpassed her own distinction by being the only woman to have made the final with four different partners between 1999–2006.

== Early life ==
Karina Smirnoff was born in Kharkiv, Ukrainian SSR, Soviet Union, and is of half-Greek and half-Russian Jewish descent. At 11, she began competing in ballroom dancing. She chose to pursue ballroom dancing. In 1993, Smirnoff immigrated to the United States.

=== Education ===
Smirnoff attended multiple schools, including Nerinx Hall High School in St. Louis and Christopher Columbus High School in The Bronx. She finally graduated from the Bronx High School of Science. Smirnoff graduated from New York City's Fordham University with a double major in economics and information system programming.

== Career ==
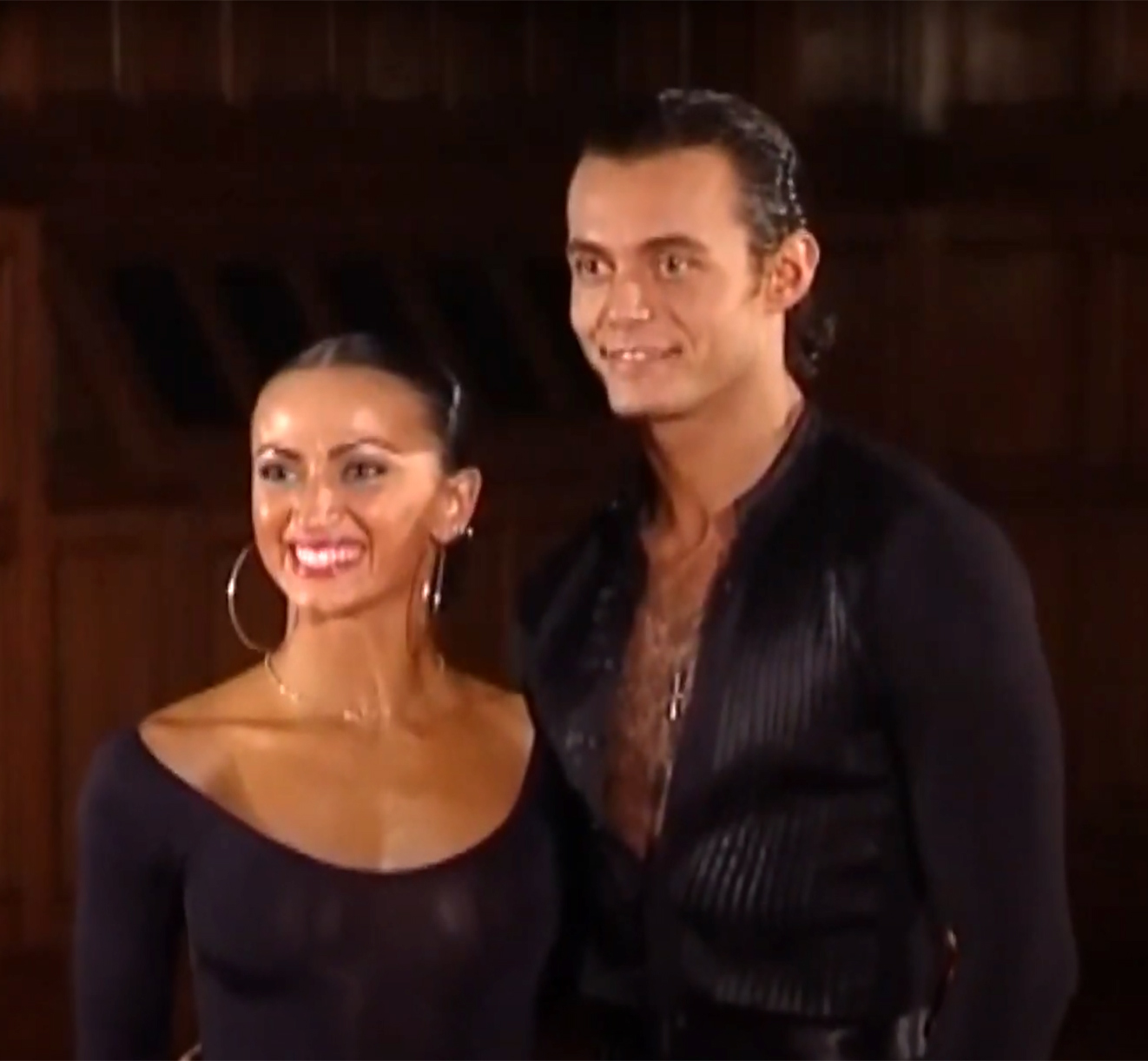
Karina Smirnoff and Slavik Kryklyvyy

Early in Smirnoff's dancing career, she and Roman Nabatov competed as an amateur couple for USA. They ended their dance partnership in January 1997. Smirnoff soon after started dancing with Paul Killick in October 1998 as a professional couple for England; this partnership ended in July 1999. Immediately, Louis Van Amstel and Karina Smirnoff, in July 1999, entered a professional dance partnership, representing the U.S.A; the partnership ended in December 2000. From January 2001 to September 2005, Smirnoff was in a dance partnership with Slavik Kryklyvyy and they represented the U.S.A; this partnership thus far is her most successful one. Kryklyvyy and Smirnoff earned numerous top titles and high ratings together.

Smirnoff appeared in the 2004 film Shall We Dance? as a dance instructor and was Stanley Tucci's dance partner. She also released a fitness DVD, Shape Up With Karina Smirnoff.

Her last professional partner recorded in competitions was Dmitri Timokhin representing Russia in October 2005. They won first place at the 2006 Grand-Prix Dynamo in Moscow. They finished dancing together in June 2006. Smirnoff was the project manager/director of a dancing event entitled "Day & Night", held on November 18, 2006 at the Hollywood & Highlands Grand Ballroom. She guest starred as Madame Escajeda in an episode of Hannah Montana. She is featured in a nude pictorial in the May 2011 American issue of Playboy magazine.

In November 2016, it was announced that Smirnoff would be joining the cast of E! reality series Famously Single for its second season.

== Dancing with the Stars ==
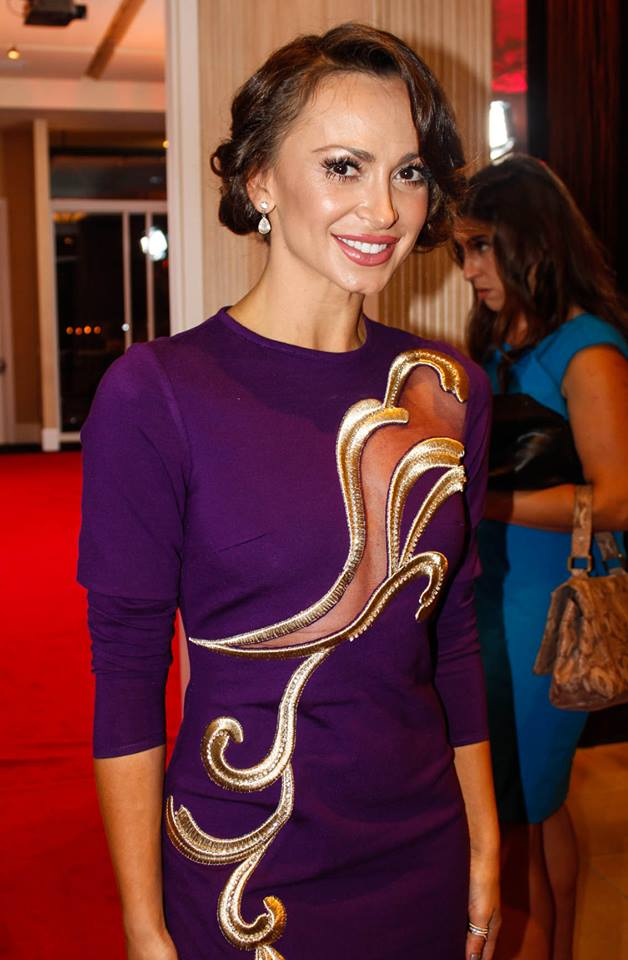
Smirnoff in 2014

Smirnoff was a performer on the third season of the ABC series Dancing with the Stars with celebrity partner Mario Lopez. They finished in second place, losing to the team of Emmitt Smith and Cheryl Burke. Smirnoff returned to the show on March 19, 2007 for Season 4, this time partnered with Billy Ray Cyrus, country singer and Hannah Montana star. The pair was the seventh to be eliminated from the competition on May 8, 2007. Her partner for Season 5 of the show was current five-division world champion boxer, Floyd Mayweather Jr. On October 16, 2007, Karina and Floyd were the fourth couple eliminated from competition and came in 9th place. She returned for Season 6, partnered with singer Mario and finished in 5th place. In Season 7, she was partnered with chef Rocco DiSpirito and they were the fourth pair to be eliminated with a finish of 9th place for the second time.

For the eighth season, Smirnoff's partner was Apple Inc. co-founder Steve Wozniak. They were eliminated in the fourth round on March 31, 2009, along with Holly Madison and her partner Dmitry Chaplin. For the ninth season, she was partnered with singer Aaron Carter. They were eliminated on November 10, 2009, placing fifth. In the eleventh season, she was partnered with Michael "The Situation" Sorrento from MTV's reality television show Jersey Shore. They were eliminated in the fourth week. In the twelfth season of Dancing with the Stars, she was partnered with movie star Ralph Macchio. They were eliminated in the semi-finals.

Smirnoff appeared on the thirteenth season of Dancing with the Stars, where she was partnered with All My Children actor J. R. Martinez. Smirnoff and Martinez ended up winning the competition against Rob Kardashian and his partner Cheryl Burke and Ricki Lake and her partner Derek Hough. This was the first time Smirnoff had advanced to the finals since her inaugural season in season 3 with Mario López. For the fourteenth season of Dancing With The Stars, Karina was partnered with singer Gavin DeGraw. They were eliminated in week 5. For the fifteenth season, she was partnered with season four winner, Apolo Anton Ohno and ended up placing 5th. For the sixteenth season, she is partnered with NFL star Jacoby Jones. Smirnoff became injured when she was performing a flip with partner Jones during rehearsals for their week 9 Lindy hop. The couple was able to reach finals but came in third place losing to Zendaya and Kellie Pickler who took second and first place respectively. For season 17 she was partnered with former High School Musical actor Corbin Bleu and landed in second place behind Amber Riley and Derek Hough. For season 18, she was partnered with former NHL player Sean Avery. They were the second couple eliminated in a double elimination on Week 2. This marked Smirnoff's earliest exit of the competition. For season 19 she was paired with UFC fighter and actor Randy Couture. They were eliminated in week 3, finishing in 11th place. After taking a one-season break, Smirnoff returned for season 21 and was paired with professional jockey, Victor Espinoza. The couple was eliminated on Week 2 and finished in 12th place. For season 22, she was partnered with former NFL quarterback Doug Flutie. They were eliminated on week 6 of competition and finished in 9th place.

On October 24, 2023, Smirnoff returned to the Season 32 ballroom, along with many of her original DWTS peers, performing a group choreographed Waltz, to "Moon River", as a special tribute in memory of DWTS judge, Len Goodman. Goodman had retired one year earlier in 2022, after the previous season, and died on April 22, 2023, after a long battle with cancer.

=== Performances ===
Season	Partner	Place
3	Mario Lopez	2nd
4	Billy Ray Cyrus	5th
5	Floyd Mayweather Jr.	9th
6	Mario	5th
7	Rocco DiSpirito	9th
8	Steve Wozniak	10th
9	Aaron Carter	5th
11	Mike Sorrentino	9th
12	Ralph Macchio	4th
13	J. R. Martinez	1st
14	Gavin DeGraw	9th
15	Apolo Anton Ohno	5th
16	Jacoby Jones	3rd
17	Corbin Bleu	2nd
18	Sean Avery	11th
19	Randy Couture	11th
21	Victor Espinoza	12th
22	Doug Flutie	9th

==== With Mario Lopez (Season 3) 27.6 ====
Week	Dance(s)/Song	Carrie Ann's Score	Len's Score	Bruno's Score	Result
1	Cha-Cha-Cha/"Walkin' on the Sun"	9	8	9	Safe
2	Quickstep/"Do Your Thing"	7	6	8	Safe
3	Tango/"What You Waiting For?"	8	6	8	Safe
4	Paso Doble/"Cancion Del Mariachi"	10	9	10	Safe
5	Rumba/"The Way You Look Tonight"	9	9	9	Safe
6	Mambo/"Ran Kan Kan"	9	9	10	No elimination
7	Foxtrot/"I Wanna Be Loved by You"	10	9	10	Safe
7	Jive/"Shake a Tail Feather"	9	9	9	Safe
8 Quarter Finals	Waltz/"Dark Waltz"	9	9	10	Bottom two
8 Quarter Finals	Samba/"Superstition"	10	9	10	Bottom two
9 Semi-Finals	Tango/"Whatever Lola Wants"	10	10	10	Safe
9 Semi-Finals	Cha-Cha-Cha/"Bad"	10	9	10	Safe
10; Finals	Samba/"Sir Duke"	10	9	10	Runner-up
10; Finals	Paso Doble/"Cancion Del Mariachi"	10	10	10	Runner-up
10; Finals	Freestyle/"It Take Two"	10	10	10	Runner-up

==== With Billy Ray Cyrus (Season 4) 19.0 ====
Week	Dance(s)/Song(s)	Carrie Ann Inaba	Len Goodman	Bruno Tonioli	Result
1	Cha-Cha-Cha/"I Want My Mullet Back"	5	4	4	No elimination
2	Quickstep/"Ring of Fire"	7	7	7	Safe
3	Tango/"Rock the Casbah"	7	7	7	Safe
4	Paso Doble/"Black Betty"	7	7	7	Safe
5	Rumba/"What's Love Got to Do with It?"	6	6	5	Safe
6	Jive/"I Love to Boogie"	7	7	7	Safe
7	Waltz/"Play Me"	5	6	6	Bottom two
7	Samba/Living in America"	7	7	7	Bottom two
8 Quarter Finals	Foxtrot/"Stand by Your Man"	7	6	5	Eliminated
8 Quarter Finals	Mambo/"My Way"	6	7	7	Eliminated

==== With Floyd Mayweather Jr. (Season 5) 20.8 ====
Week	Dance/Song	Carrie Ann Inaba	Len Goodman	Bruno Tonioli	Result
1	Cha-Cha-Cha/"The Way You Move"	6	6	6	Safe
2	Quickstep/"Signed, Sealed, Delivered I'm Yours"	7	7	7	Safe
3	Jive/"Mess Around"	7	7	7	Bottom two
4	Paso Doble/"Captain from Castille"	7	8	8	Eliminated

==== With Mario (Season 6) 25.4 ====
Week	Dance(s)/Song(s)	Carrie Ann	Len	Bruno	Result
1	Cha-Cha-Cha/"Request Line"	8	8	8	No elimination
2	Quickstep/"Valerie"	9	8	9	Safe
3	Tango/"El Tango de Roxanne"	7	6	8	Last to be called safe
4	Paso Doble/"Higher Ground"	8	7	9	Safe
5	Samba/"A-Tisket, A-Tasket"	9	9	9	Safe
6	Rumba/"Let's Get It On"	9	9	10	Bottom two
7	Foxtrot/"I'm Your Man"; Mambo/"Mambo a la Sandoval"	8; 9	8; 9	8; 9	Safe
8 Quarter Finals	Viennese Waltz/"If I Ain't Got You"; Jive/"Little Bitty Pretty One"	9; 9	9; 8	9; 9	Eliminated

==== With Rocco DiSpirito (Season 7) 17.8 ====
Week	Dance(s)/Song(s)	Carrie Ann Inaba's Score	Len Goodman's Score	Bruno Tonioli's Score	Result
1	Foxtrot/"Stray Cat Strut"; Mambo/"La Comay"	5; 7	4; 7	5; 7	Safe
2	Rumba/"You'll Never Find Another Love Like Mine"	5	6	5	Safe
3	Viennese Waltz/"What's New Pussycat?"	7	7	6	Safe*
4	Samba/"I Go to Rio"	6	6	6	Eliminated

- Would have been eliminated, but was not after Misty May-Treanor suffered an injury and was forced to withdraw from competition.

==== With Steve Wozniak (Season 8) 13.0 ====
Week	Dance/Song	Carrie Ann Inaba	Len Goodman	Bruno Tonioli	Result
1	Cha-Cha-Cha/"You Ain't Seen Nothing Yet"	5	4	4	No elimination
2	Quickstep/"Oh, Boy!"	6	5	6	Dance off
3	Samba/"Jump in the Line (Shake, Senora)"	4	3	3	Safe
4	Argentine Tango/"Cite Tango"	4	4	4	Eliminated

==== With Aaron Carter (Season 9) 24.0 ====
Week	Dance(s)/Song(s)	Carrie Ann	Len/Baz	Bruno	Result
1	Cha-Cha-Cha/"Beggin'"	7	8	7	Safe
1	Viennese Waltz/"I Am Your Man"	Awarded	10	Points	Safe
2	Quickstep/"The Muppet Show Theme Song"	9	9*	9	Safe
3	Rumba/"Spotlight"	8	6	7	Safe
4	Lambada/"Dr. Beat"	6	6	6	Bottom two
5	Argentine Tango/"Epoca"	8	8	8	Bottom two
6	Waltz/"Three Times a Lady"	8	9	8	Safe
6	Mambo Marathon/"Ran Kan Kan"	Awarded	8	Points	Safe
7	Jive/"We're Not Gonna Take It"	9	10	10	Bottom two
7	Paso Doble/"I Hate Myself for Loving You"	8	8	8	Bottom two
8 Quarter Finals	Foxtrot/"Lucky"	7	8	8	Eliminated
8 Quarter Finals	90's Samba/"Two Princes"	9	9	9	Eliminated

- Score was awarded by stand-in judge Baz Luhrmann.

==== With Mike "The Situation" Sorrentino (Season 11) ====
- Season average: 16.2; placed 9th

Week #	Dance/Song	Judges' score			Result
Week #	Dance/Song	Inaba	Goodman	Tonioli	Result
1	Cha-cha-cha / "Break Your Heart"	5	5	5	Safe
2	Quickstep / "Americano"	6	6	6	Last to be called safe
3	Foxtrot / "Boom Boom Pow"	7	6	7	Safe
4*	Argentine Tango / "Sweet Dreams (Are Made of This)"	4	4	4	Eliminated
4*	Argentine Tango / "Sweet Dreams (Are Made of This)"	6	5	5	Eliminated

- As part of acoustic music/double-scoring week, the judges had to give scores for both technical and performance.

==== With Ralph Macchio (Season 12) ====
- Season average: 23.4; placed 4th

Week #	Dance/Song	Judges' score			Result
Week #	Dance/Song	Inaba	Goodman	Tonioli	Result
1	Foxtrot / "Ain't That a Kick in the Head?"	8	8	8	Safe
2	Jive / "Nobody But Me"	7	7	7	Safe
3	Rumba / "Stay Gold"	7	7	7	Safe
4	Waltz / "Romeo and Juliet"	8	8	9	Safe
5	Samba / "Sweet Home Alabama"	8	7	7	Safe
6	Paso Doble / "Gonna Make You Sweat (Everybody Dance Now)"	8	8	8	Last to be called safe
7	Quickstep / "Pencil Full of Lead"	*9 / 10	8	9	Safe
7	Team Cha-cha-cha / "Born This Way"	*8 / 8	7	7	Safe
8	Viennese Waltz / "Maybe I, Maybe You"	8	8	9	Last to be called safe
8	Instant Cha-cha-cha / "Stuck in the Middle with You"	7	7	7	Last to be called safe
9	Argentine Tango / "Violentango"	8	9	8	Eliminated
9	Salsa / "I Know You Want Me (Calle Ocho)"	8	7	8	Eliminated

- Additional scores for Week 7 were awarded by guest judge Donnie Burns.

==== With J.R. Martinez (Season 13) ====
- Season average: 26.4; placed 1st

Week #	Dance/Song	Judges' score			Result
Week #	Dance/Song	Inaba	Goodman	Tonioli	Result
1	Viennese Waltz / "Breakaway"	8	7	7	Safe
2	Jive / "Jump, Jive An' Wail!"	7	7	8	Safe
3	Rumba / "If You're Reading This"	9	8	9	Safe
4	Foxtrot / "Theme from The Pink Panther"	8	9	9	Safe
5	Samba / "Conga"	9	9	10	Safe
6	Quickstep / "Hot Honey Rag"	10	9	10	Safe
7	Tango / "Theme from Ghostbusters"	9	8	8	Safe
7	Team Tango / "Disturbia"	8	7	8	Safe
8	Waltz / "What the World Needs Now"	10	10	10	Safe
8	Instant Jive / "Tutti Frutti"	10	10	10	Safe
9	Paso Doble / "Theme from The Legend of Zorro"	8	7	8	Last to be called safe
9	Argentine Tango / "Bust Your Windows"	9	9	9	Last to be called safe
9	Cha-cha-cha Relay / "I Like How It Feels"	Awarded	6	Points	Last to be called safe
10	Cha-cha-cha / "Let's Get Loud"	8	7	9	WINNERS
10	Freestyle / "Whine Up"	10	10	10	WINNERS
10	Jive / "Jump, Jive An' Wail!"	Awarded	28	Points	WINNERS
10	Instant Samba / "Shake Your Bon-Bon"	10	10	10	WINNERS

==== With Gavin DeGraw (Season 14) ====
- Season average: 21.4; placed 9th

Week #	Dance/Song	Judges' score			Result
Week #	Dance/Song	Inaba	Goodman	Tonioli	Result
1	Foxtrot / "I Run to You"	7	6	7	No elimination
2	Jive / "Real Wild Child"	7	7	7	Bottom two
3	Rumba / "New York State of Mind"	8	8	8	Bottom two
4	Tango / "Paint It, Black"	8	8	7	Safe
5	Samba / "Sweetheart from Venezuela"; Dance Duel Cha-cha-cha / "The Edge of Glory"	6 Lost	6 This	7 Event	Eliminated

==== With Apolo Anton Ohno (Season 15) ====
- Season average: 27.3; placed 5th

Week #	Dance/Song	Judges' score			Result
Week #	Dance/Song	Inaba	Goodman	Tonioli	Result
1	Cha-cha-cha / "Party Rock Anthem"	7.5	7	7.5	Safe
2	Quickstep / "Five Months, Two Weeks, Two Days"	8.5	8	8	Safe
3	Foxtrot / "Fever"	9	8	8.5	Safe
4	Hip-Hop / "Poison"	8.5	9	8.5* / 8.5	Safe
5	Samba / "Give It to Me Baby"; Team Freestyle / "Call Me Maybe"	8.5; 9.5	9.5; 10	9; 10	No elimination
6	Viennese Waltz / "Skin (Sarabeth)"	10	10	10	Last to be called Safe
7	Cha-cha-cha & Paso Doble / "Scream"; Swing Marathon / "Do Your Thing"	9 Awarded	9; 6	9 Points	No elimination
8	Tango / "Holding Out for a Hero"; Jive (Trio Challenge)* / "Greased Lightnin'"	10; 9.5	9.5; 9.5	10; 10	Last to be called Safe
9	Jazz / "What You Waiting For?"; Rumba / "Man in the Mirror"	8.5; 10	9; 10	9.5; 10	Eliminated

- The additional score for Week 4 was awarded by guest judge Paula Abdul.
- The dancer Ohno and Smirnoff chose for the Trio Challenge was Sasha Farber.

==== With Jacoby Jones (Season 16) ====
- Season average: 25.6; placed 3rd

Week #	Dance/Song	Judges' score			Result
Week #	Dance/Song	Inaba	Goodman	Tonioli	Result
1	Cha-cha-cha / "Good Feeling"	7	6	7	No elimination
2	Jazz / "Five Guys Named Moe"	8	7	8	Safe
3	Prom Group Dance / "The Rockafeller Skank"; Rumba / "Stay"	Awarded; 8	2; 8	Points; 8	Safe
4	Foxtrot / "Watching You"	8	8	8	Safe
5	Jive* / "Long Tall Sally"	9	8	9	Safe
6	Quickstep / "For Once in My Life"; Team Paso Doble / "Higher Ground"	8; 7	7; 8	8; 7	Safe
7	Salsa / "Danza Kuduro"; Jive Dance Off / "Good Golly Miss Molly"	9 Lost	9 This	9 Event	Safe
8	Viennese Waltz / "It's a Man's, Man's, Man's World"; Paso Doble (Trio Challenge)* / "La Virgen de la Macarena"	9; 8	9; 9	9; 8	Last to be called Safe
9	Argentine Tango / "Concierto Para Quinteto"; Lindy Hop / "Ding Dong Daddy of the D-Car Line"	10; 10	10; 9	10; 10	Safe
10	Jive / "Shake It"; Cha-cha-cha Relay / "Treasure"; Freestyle / "Can't Hold Us"; Instant Salsa / "Aguanile"	9 Awarded; 9; 10	9; 2; 9; 10	9 points 9; 10	Third Place

- For the 'Len's Side-by-Side Challenge', Jones and Smirnoff chose Maksim Chmerkovskiy and Anna Trebunskaya to dance alongside them.
- The dancer Jones and Smirnoff chose for the Trio Challenge was Cheryl Burke.

==== With Corbin Bleu (Season 17) 27.4 ====
Season 17 – Celebrity partner: Corbin Bleu; Season average: 27.4; placed 2nd

Week #	Dance/Song	Judges' score			Result
Week #	Dance/Song	Inaba	Goodman	Tonioli	Result
1	Contemporary / "If I Lose Myself"	8	8	8	No elimination
2	Jive / "Kiss You"	9	8	9	Safe
3	Quickstep / "Diga Diga Doo"	9	8	9	Safe
4	Paso Doble / "Zorongo"	9	9*	9	Safe
5	Foxtrot / "My Wish"	9	9	10	Safe
6	Viennese Waltz / "Theme from Game of Thrones"; Switch-Up Challenge / Various	8 Awarded	7; 4	8 Points	No elimination
7	Cha-cha-cha / "Pumpin Blood"; Team Freestyle / "The Fox (What Does the Fox Say?)"	10; 10	9; 10	10; 10	Safe
8	Argentine Tango / "Welcome to Burlesque"; Cha-cha-cha Dance-Off / "Woman's World"	9 Awarded	9*; 3	9 Points	Safe
9	Waltz / "Apologize"; Jazz (Trio Challenge)* / "Yeah!"	9; 10	9; 10	10; 10	Safe
10	Tango / "My Songs Know What You Did in the Dark (Light Em Up)"; Rumba / "My Songs Know What You Did in the Dark (Light Em Up)" (acoustic version)	9; 10	8/9*; 10/10*	9; 10	Safe
11	Quickstep / "Diga Diga Doo"; Samba Relay / "No Scrubs"; Freestyle / "Smooth Criminal"; Cha-cha-cha & Foxtrot / "All Night"	9 Awarded; 10; 9	9; 5; 10; 9	9 Points; 10; 9	Runner-up

- Week 4 score was given by Julianne Hough.
- Week 8 score was given by Cher.
- The dancer Bleu and Smirnoff chose for the Trio Challenge was Witney Carson.
- Additional score for Week 10 was awarded by guest judge Maksim Chmerkovskiy.

==== With Sean Avery (Season 18) 20.5 ====
Season 18 – Celebrity partner: Sean Avery; Season average: 20.5; placed 11th

Week #	Dance/Song	Judges' score			Result
Week #	Dance/Song	Inaba	Goodman	Tonioli	Result
1	Contemporary / "Somewhere Only We Know"	7	6	7	No elimination
2	Salsa / "Dance Bailalo"	7	7	7	Eliminated

==== With Randy Couture (Season 19) 28.3 ====
Season 19 – Celebrity partner: Randy Couture; Season average: 28.3; placed 11th

Week #	Dance/Song	Judges' score				Result
Week #	Dance/Song	Inaba	Goodman	J. Hough	Tonioli	Result
1	Foxtrot / "The Way You Look Tonight"	8	7	8	8	Safe
2	Cha-cha-cha / "(I Can't Get No) Satisfaction"	7	7	7	7	Safe
3	Paso Doble / "Eye of the Tiger"	7	7*	6	6	Eliminated

==== Notes ====
- Week 3 score was awarded by Kevin Hart in place of Len Goodman.

==== With Victor Espinoza (Season 21) 17.3 ====
Season 21 – Celebrity partner: Victor Espinoza; Season average: 17.3; placed: 12th

Week #	Dance/Song	Judges' score			Result
Week #	Dance/Song	Inaba	J. Hough	Tonioli	Result
1	Salsa / "G.D.F.R"	5	5	5	No elimination
2	Jive / "La Bamba"	6	5	6	Eliminated
2	Rumba / "Girl on Fire"	7	6	7	Eliminated

==== With Doug Flutie (Season 22) 19.2 ====
Season 22 – Celebrity partner: Doug Flutie; Season average:19.2; placed: 9th

Week #	Dance/Song	Judges' score			Result
Week #	Dance/Song	Inaba	Goodman	Tonioli	Result
1	Foxtrot / "Sweet Caroline"	5	5	5	No elimination
2	Paso Doble / "Buster Voodoo"	7	6	7	Bottom three
3	Waltz / "Rainbow Connection"	7	6	7	Last to be called safe
4	Jazz / "A Spoonful of Sugar"	6	6/6^{1}	6	Safe
5^{2}	Tango / "Black and Gold"	7	7/7^{3}	7	No elimination
6	Bollywood / "Jai Ho"	7	7	7	Eliminated

^{1} Score given by guest judge Zendaya.
^{2} For this week only, as part of "America's Switch Up", Flutie performed with Peta Murgatroyd instead of Smirnoff. Smirnoff performed with Antonio Brown.
^{3} Score given by guest judge Maksim Chmerkovskiy.

== Personal life ==
Smirnoff grew up as an only child. Her parents own a liquor store in Staten Island. She has an American Staffordshire Terrier dog named Randy.

She was engaged to fellow DWTS pro and Ukrainian Maksim Chmerkovskiy for nine months in 2009.

In October 2009, Smirnoff began dating Major League Baseball pitcher Brad Penny. They became engaged in October 2010, but ended the engagement in December 2011.

Smirnoff became engaged to entrepreneur Jason Adelman in January 2015. On March 11, 2015, both individuals announced that they had split and their engagement was off.

In the summer of 2015 she was featured with her cast mates on Celebrity Family Feud. On the stage she danced a salsa number with host Steve Harvey. Her fellow dancers gave them a perfect "10."

In April 2020, Smirnoff gave birth to her first child, Theo Gabriel, with boyfriend Justinas Duknauskas.
