= Jillian La Valette =

Jillian La Valette (born Maida Vale, London, 19 August 1934) is a professional ballroom dancer and teacher. With her dance partner James Arnell she won the professional International Latin American Dance Championship six times between 1955 and 1965.

== Early life ==
La Valette's father was a civil engineer. When he worked in India, the family came also. They lived in Madras (Chennai), and Trichonopoly (Trichy), both in Tamil Nadu.

== Dance career ==
Jillian started ballet dancing at six years old, and took lessons wherever the family lived. Jillian’s conversion to ballroom dancing came quite late (in dance terms). It occurred when she went on her own to Ceylon (Sri Lanka) when she was 16. She went there to live at the Bradley School of Dancing, for ballet training.

It was there she met, Melville Francké (1928-2020), known as Mel, who taught her her first ballroom steps. She partnered him in many an Amateur Ballroom competition in Colombo and they had many successes. Later she met Freda Newell-Jones, and continued learning Ballroom & Latin dancing. Her first ballroom medals were taken in Sri Lanka in 1952.

=== Professional dancer ===
As La Valette took lessons towards becoming a dance teacher with the Imperial Society of Teachers of Dancing (ISTD), an opportunity came to dance as a professional competitor. James Arnell, who won the 1954 International Amateur Latin American championship with Estrella Pescador, wanted to turn professional. His partner was unwilling to do this, so a search began to find him a new partner. Although he was 15 years older than Jillian, they became partners for competition Latin dancing. One factor was height: at over 6ft, he was taller than the average Latin dancer, and so was she. Also, they were both being coached by the same school, that of Monsieur Pierre, in Soho. Pierre had been instrumental in setting up Latin American dance in England, and both the teaching syllabus and the competitions were greatly influenced by him.

Jillian is qualified as a Fellow of the ISTD in both Ballroom ('Modern') and Latin American dances. She worked as a dance teacher from 1952—1971 in studios run by her mentor, Freda Newell-Jones, and until the present day as an independent teacher.

=== Competitions ===
Arnell and La Valette competed only in the Latin dance competitions, and in some ten-dance events. When they started competing there was only one major Latin competition: the International, held always at London’s Albert Hall. This they won six times, on every occasion they entered: 1955–1959 and 1965. They also won the Star and United Kingdom championship in 1961 at the Lyceum ballroom, London, and a number of less important events. 3rd place in the new World Latin Dance Championship in 1961 was their only venture into what is today the premier event of its type.
