= Gaynor Fairweather =

British ballroom dancer

Gaynor Fairweather MBE is a British professional ballroom dancer. She and her partner, Donnie Burns, were 14-time Professional World Latin Dance Champions and 11 times Professional International Latin American Dance Champions. This is by some way the record number of wins in both these top competitions. On their retirement from competition dancing they were both appointed Members of the Order of the British Empire (MBE) for services to the performing arts in the 1991 Birthday Honours.

Gaynor was introduced to Donnie by another former world champion Sammy Stopford. They were two-time amateur champions before moving to the professional level. Their professional string of wins in the world championship stood at an undefeated streak of 13 years (1984–1996) followed by one year of retirement and then another single championship followed by another retirement.

To bring the elements of Flamenco dance into their competitive repertoire they went to South America to train with world champion Flamenco dancers. They have traveled extensively to teach in Japan and Hong Kong.

Gaynor is married to Italian dancer Mirko Saccani, with whom she competed after the end of her partnership with Burns. As of 2006, she was living in Hong Kong and training wealthy socialites for Pro-Am competitions.

== Monica Wong case ==
She and Saccani were sued by a former student, heiress and banker Monica Wong, who had promised to pay them £8 million pounds over an eight-year period for exclusive coaching. However the relationship rapidly deteriorated after Saccani repeatedly verbally abused Monica Wong in public. Wong terminated the contract in 2004 on the basis of repudiatory conduct by Saccani, which she accepted and some other bases. She sued to have her £4 million downpayment returned. Judge G. P. Muttrie of the Hong Kong Court of First Instance ruled in Wong's favour in September 2006.
