= Karen Hardy =

British dancer and dance teacher

- Born: 14 July 1970 (age 56); Weymouth, Dorset, England
- Occupations: Ballroom dancer and coach

Karen Hardy (born 14 July 1970) is a British professional ballroom dancer, coach, teacher and adjudicator. In 1998, she won the professional International Latin American Dance Championship with Bryan Watson. She also won the United Kingdom Open, British National, European and World Masters championships. She now runs a dance studio at Imperial Wharf, London.

She is best known for being a professional dancer in Strictly Come Dancing from 2005 to 2009 and as a regular contributor to Strictly Come Dancing: It Takes Two. She has also filled in for some of the judges on The Strictly Live Tour.

== Dancing career ==
She started dancing aged five in her home town of Bournemouth, and competed in the United States for two years from the age of 18 winning both East and West Coast amateur championship titles. She returned to the UK in 1990 after two years in America where she teamed up with new partner Mark Lunn. It only took 6 months before they broke into the finals worldwide, representing England.

Hardy turned professional in August 1994, after being asked to partner South African dancer Bryan Watson. They were highly successful from 1995 to 1999. In January 1995, they entered the Professional Final of the Pioneer United Kingdom Open Championship finishing fourth. Their progress to the top continued over the coming year going from fourth to first. The couple won the Carl Alan award for services to the dance world, and were named the most outstanding Latin American couple in 1995 by the Ballroom Dancers' Federation. During their 5-year partnership they were World Masters, Osaka World Trophy, United Kingdom Open, International Open, British National, Italian Open, London Open, Yankee Classic Professional Latin American Champions.

Discussing her success, she writes:

To create a step and then see it copied around the world is an indescribable reward. They don't come any more dedicated and focused than Bryan, and that's why we were able to break what had been set in stone for so long.

Hardy retired from competitive dancing in 1999 and moved into coaching. She was named Teacher of the Year in 2002 and 2003 at the Crystal Palace Dance Championships. She is also an adjudicator and now judges all of the Grand Slam events worldwide which she had previously competed in and more. She is a Senior Commentator for EuroSport DanceSport Series. Hardy also co-hosts as the Master of Ceremonies in the International Open to the World Championships held annually at the Royal Albert Hall, London.

Hardy participated in the television series Faking It (series 4) for Channel 4. Along with Paul Harris, they mentored a young female kick boxer to become a Latin American dancer.

== Strictly Come Dancing ==
After seven years retirement from competitions, Hardy appeared in the third series of the BBC's television series Strictly Come Dancing. She appeared with journalist and presenter Bill Turnbull, in the 2005 Christmas show with former World Heavyweight Champion Evander Holyfield, and won the 2006 series with cricketer Mark Ramprakash. She danced in the 2007 series with actor Brian Capron. They were eliminated in the first round.

In June/July 2007, Hardy completed filming the DVD "Strictly Come Dancersize" with Erin Boag. The DVD went on general release on 4 December 2007.

In the 2008, series of Strictly Come Dancing, Hardy partnered Gary Rhodes. They were knocked out in week 3. She has since said that she left as due to Gary Rhodes work commitments he was unable to train much and so each week they would be struggling to do the routines. This caused arguments due to frustration on both sides which she didn't like causing her to "fall out of Love" with it. She does however continue to make regular appearances on sister-show Strictly Come Dancing: It Takes Two giving her professional opinion on the couple's training and performances.

In 2011, she appeared on the BBC red button service, giving live commentary on the dancing, a role she continued in 2012. From 2011 until 2017, Hardy had been a regular presenter on the sister show "It Takes Two". Her Tuesday night slot "Choreography Corner" which has essentially become a review of the previous Saturday night show. Initially the focus was on specific pieces of interesting choreography.

== Personal life ==
At the age of eight, Hardy was diagnosed with a rare and acute form of ear cancer. Despite successive operations, the cancer returned three times. As a consequence of this, Hardy was advised to take up the art of ballroom dancing to compensate for the loss in her balance. A last-ditch operation when she was 21 cleared the cancer permanently. As a result of the cancer, Hardy lost 70% of the hearing in her left ear and in August 2012 was fitted with a hearing device.
