= Bryan Watson (dancer) =

South African ballroom dancer (born 1969)

- Born: 18 April 1969 (age 56); Durban, South Africa
- Occupation: Ballroom dancer

Bryan Watson (born 18 April 1969) was nine times Professional World Latin Dance Champion and won the International Latin American Championship five times.

Watson was born in Durban, South Africa. He became the UK Open Amateur champion with Claudia Leonie in 1991 and the runner-up in the International Latin Professional World Championships with Karen Hardy in 1996. He then won his first International Latin Professional World Championships with Carmen Vincelj in 1999. Watson and Vincelj proceeded to win every major International Latin Professional Championships that they entered until their retirement from competition in 2007. The couple continue to run a dance teaching studio in Wimbledon, London, and gave an interesting interview on the subject of retiring from competition.

== Career ==
=== World championships ===
Bryan Watson and Carmen Vincelj won the World Dance Council's World Professional Latin Championship for nine years running, from 1999 to 2007.

=== International Latin American Championship ===
Watson won the Professional Latin American title at the International Championships at the Albert Hall, London, five times. These are the oldest recognised Latin championships in ballroom dance.

- 1998 with Karen Hardy as partner.
- 2000, 2001, 2003, 2004 with Carmen Vincelj as partner.

=== Other international titles ===
Watson also won the British Open Latin Championship seven times (details not to hand).

- 2005: Blackpool Professional Latin 1st
- 2005: WDC European Professional Latin 2005 Russia 1st
- 2005: German Professional Latin 2005 Germany 1st
- 2004: Moscow Kremlin Cup 2004 Latin 1st
- 2004: British Professional Latin 1st
- 2004: Professional Latin Cup 2004. Germany 1st
- 2004: German Professional Latin 2004 Germany 1st
- 2004: WDC German Masters Latin 2004. Germany 1st
- 2003: WDC World Masters 2003 Professional LA Austria 1st
- 2003: GP von Deutschland (Grand Prix) Closed Professional LA 1st
- 2003: WDC US Open Professional LA USA 1st
- 2003: WDC German Open GOC 2003 Professional LA Germany 1st
- International Latin American Dance Champions
- World Latin Dance Champions
