= Joanna Leunis =

Latin ballroom dancer (born 1981)

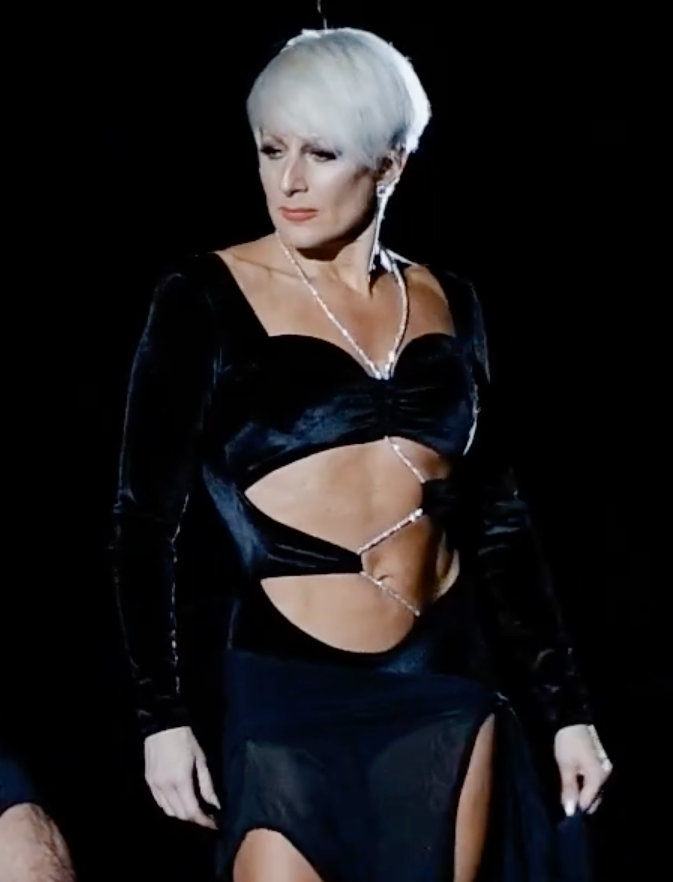
- Born: May 22, 1981 (age 44); Liège, Belgium
- Occupation: Dancer

Joanna Leunis (born May 22, 1981 in Rocourt, Liège, Belgium), is a professional Latin ballroom dancer. With Michael Malitowski, she is a former professional World Latin Dance Champion and the current International Latin American Dance Champion. The couple represented Poland until 2011, and then choosing to represent England until their retirement in 2015.

At the age of 8, she suffered from a blood disease similar to leukemia, but recovered after a year on bedrest. Joanna speaks several languages, including French, English, Dutch and German, and is reportedly learning Italian. Joanna’s dance background includes training in ballet, tap and ballroom and Latin American dance. Prior to her partnership with Michael Malitowski, Joanna had several successful partnerships. At age 18, Joanna won the World Amateur Latin Championship, with Slavik Kryklyvyy. Later, with Malitowski, she won the WDC World Professional Latin Championship in 2008 and 2009. In 2012, Leunis and Malitowski became Open British Champions.

The couples partnership included wins in all the most prestigious Latin dance championships. As competitive dancers, they specialised entirely in the Latin dance.

After winning the Professional Latin Championship at the Blackpool Dance Festival 2015 for the eighth time, Michael and Joanna announced their retirement from the competition circuit.

In August 2019, it was announced that Michael and Joanna had decided to separate. They no longer live, work or dance together.
