= Sirpa Suutari =

Finnish professional ballroom dancer

Sirpa Suutari (Sirpa Suutari-Jääskö) is a Finnish professional ballroom dancer.

Sirpa started dancing ballet at the age of 5 at her native town of Oulu. At 10 she switched to Dancesport. She won a number of Dancesport championships in Finland in 10 Dances category with her partner Timo Pukkila, as well as several titles in junior category with Pekka Suutari-Jaasko. After that she was finalist in Junior Latin with Tony Wong. In 1989 she teamed up with Jukka Haapalainen and turned to Professional category of ballroom championships. They retired from competitive dance in 2002 and have become the Latin cabaret dance artists.

At the peak of their success, during 1997–2001, they won a large number of 1st and 2nd places in various international championships. Their highest rating was 1 (in 1997,1998,1999, 2001).

For their performances in Professional Latin they have earned a number of (non-championship) awards, including the World Dance & Dance Sport Council ”Isadora Duncan” Award (2002).

As of 2010, her residence was in London, Kensington Gardens, and at Katajanokka, Helsinki, so she and Jukka travel much between England and Finland, and to Japan.
