= Jukka Haapalainen =

Finnish professional ballroom dancer

Jukka Haapalainen is a Finnish professional ballroom dancer.

He started dancing at the age of 5 in his hometown Lapua. In 1989 he teamed up with Sirpa Suutari and turned to Professional category of ballroom championships. They retired from competitive dance in 2002 and have become the Latin cabaret dance artists. At the peak of their success, during 1997–2001, they won a large number of 1st and 2nd places in various international championships. Their highest rating was 1887 (in 2001).

For their performances in Professional Latin they have earned a number of (non-championship) awards, including the World Dance & Dance Sport Council ”Isadora Duncan” Award (2002).

Haapalainen lives in London, England.
