= Donnie Burns =

Scottish professional ballroom dancer (born 1959)

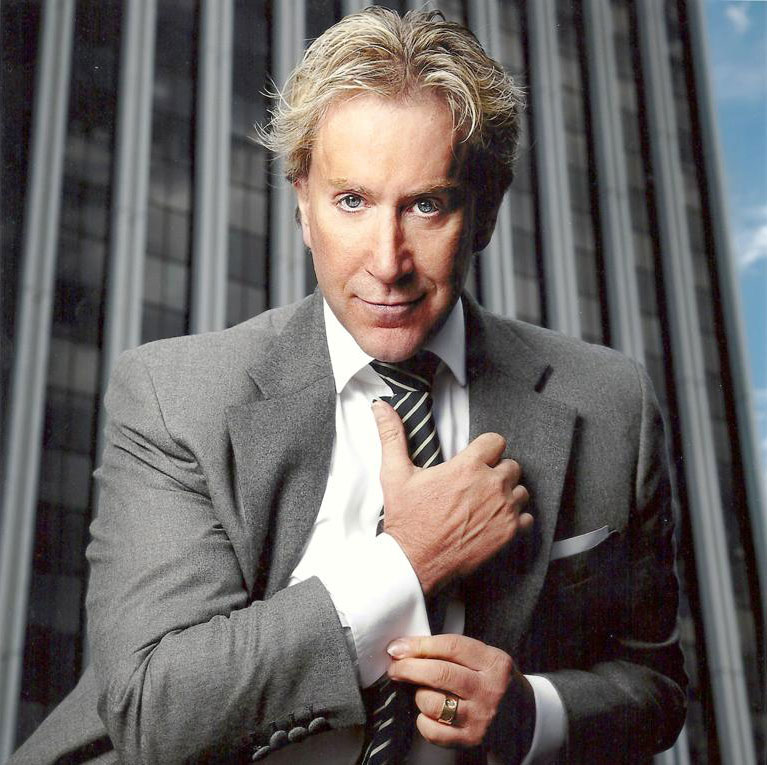
photo of Donnie Burns

Donnie Burns MBE (born 1959) is a Scottish professional ballroom dancer, specialising in Latin dance.

He and his former partner Gaynor Fairweather were 14-time World Professional Latin champions: this is by some way the record for this title. They were also eleven times International Latin American Dance Champions, and this is also a record. On their competitive retirement both were honoured by appointment as Members of the Order of the British Empire (MBE) in the 1991 Birthday Honours. Donnie was undefeated in any competitive dance contest for nearly 20 years of continuous competition, a record in any major category of ballroom dance; this is now in the Guinness Book of Records. During this period he won major titles in countries throughout the world.

Since 2005, he has been President of the World Dance Council. In 1979, he was a winner of the Carl Alan Award for outstanding services to dance.

In 2008, Burns married swing dance and International Latin dancer Heidi Groskreutz.

Burns was the hero of the character Mr. Aoki in the 1996 Japanese film Shall We Dance?.

Burns also appeared during week 7 of the 12th season of Dancing with the Stars.
