= Latin dance =

Dance styles originating in Latin America

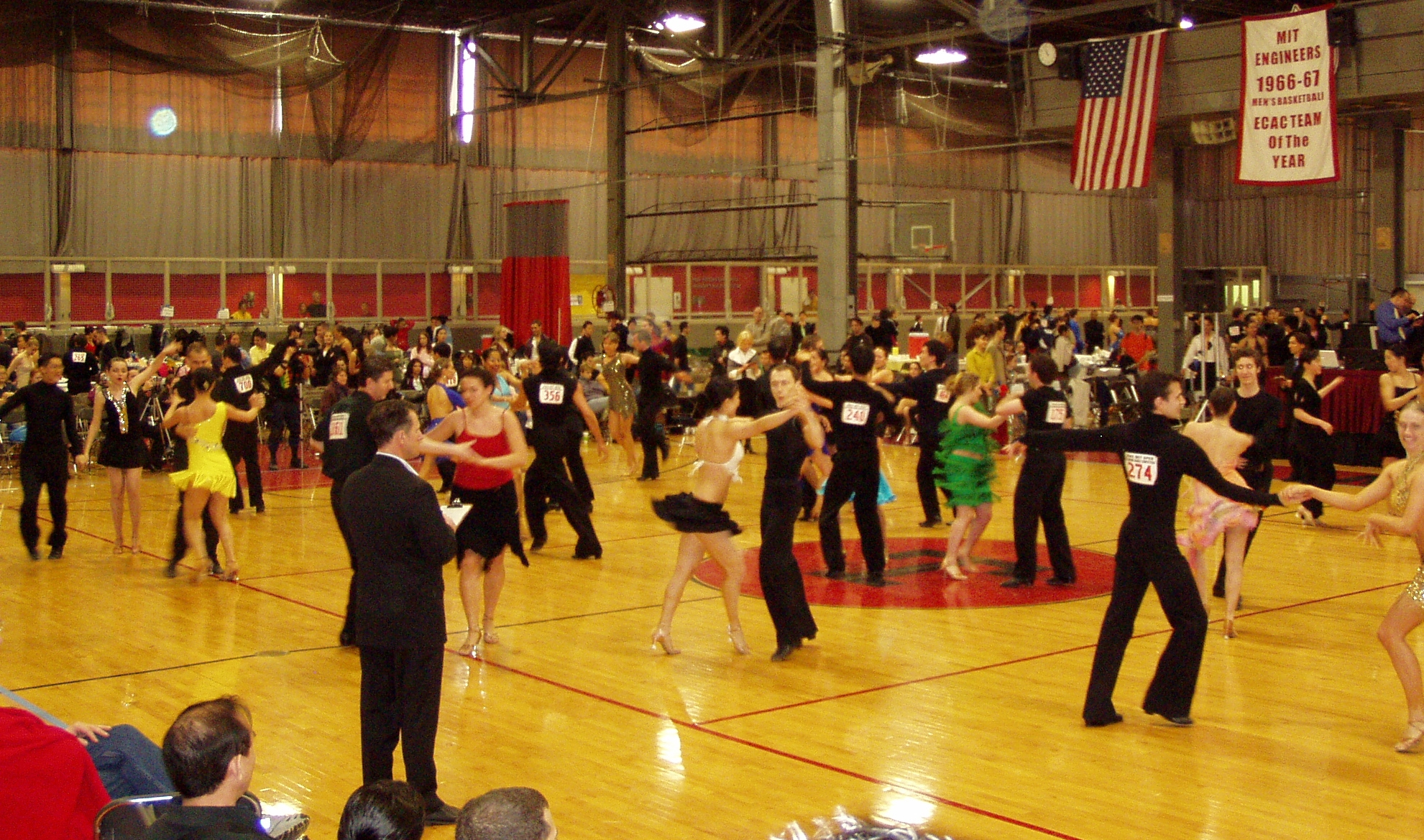
Intermediate level international-style Latin dancing at the 2006 MIT ballroom dance competition. A judge stands in the foreground.

Latin dance is a general label, and a term in partner dance competition jargon. It refers to types of ballroom dance and folk dance that mainly originated in Latin America, though a few styles originated elsewhere.

The category of Latin dances in the international dancesport competitions consists of the Cha-cha-cha, Rumba, Samba, Paso Doble, and Jive.

Social Latin dances (Street Latin) include salsa, mambo, merengue, rumba, bachata, bomba and plena. There are many dances which were popular in the first part of the 20th century, but which are now of only historical interest. The Cuban danzón is a good example.

Perreo is a Puerto Rican dance associated with reggaeton music with Jamaican and Caribbean influences. Argentinian folk dances are chacarera, escondido and zamba, also tango used to be a popular dance until the mid-20th century. Cueca is Chilean folk dance. Uruguayan folk dances are pericón, polka, ranchera, etc, also candombe is a common street and parade dance in the cities. Typical Bolivian folk dances are the morenada, kullawada, caporales and the recently created tinku. In Colombia, one of the typical dances is the cumbia.

== Origin ==
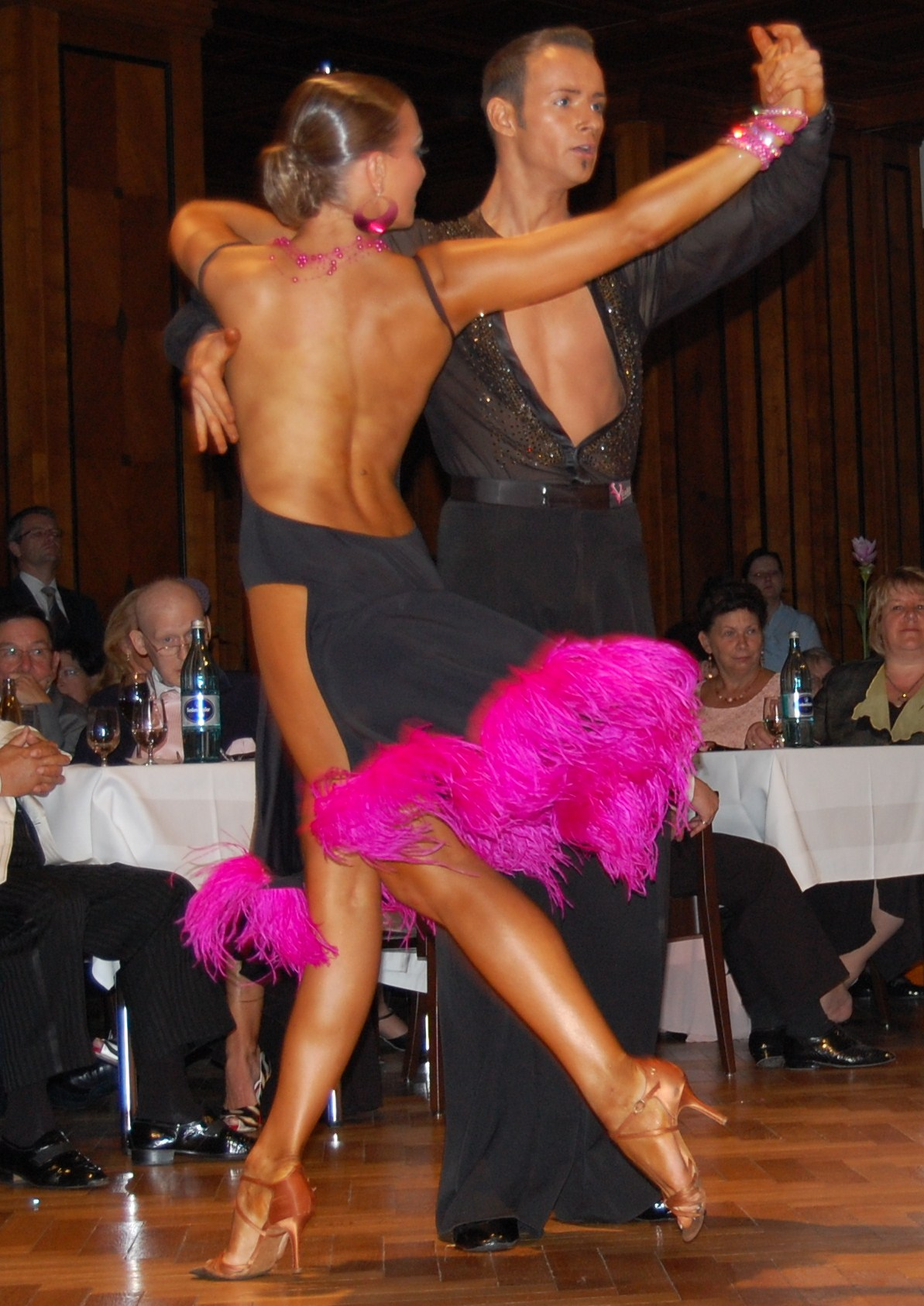
Latin dancers in their costumes. The woman is wearing a backless dress with deep slits on its lower portion, while the man is wearing a shirt with top buttons open.

Latin dance draws from Indigenous American, European, and African influences. The earliest native roots for Latin dance came from the Aztecs, Guarani, Aymara, Incas and Tehuelches among others. When sixteenth-century seagoing explorers returned home to Portugal and Spain, they brought along tales of the native peoples. According to Rachel Hanson, no one knows how long these dance traditions were established, but they were already being developed and ritualized when they were observed by the Europeans. This suggests that these Native influences became the foundation for Latin dancing. Indigenous dance often told stories of everyday activities such as hunting, agriculture, or astronomy. When European settlers and conquistadors began to colonize South America in the early sixteenth century, they reinvented the local dance traditions, but still kept the styles of the natives. Catholic settlers merged the native culture with their own and incorporated catholic saints and stories to the dance. The Europeans were captivated by the highly structured, large member dance working together in a precise manner.

After the Europeans brought home the Aztec/Inca influences in the sixteenth century, they incorporated their own styles to the dance. Since the Aztec/Inca dances were performed in a group, many of the European dances were performed by a male and female. This was a new practice because European dances prohibited male and female dance partners from touching each other. The benefits of such a dance style allowed musical appreciation and social integration, which became the form of Latin dance. However, “much of the storytelling element disappeared from the genre as the focus moved toward the rhythm and steps,” Hanson explains. The movement evolved differently because it brought a certain element of daintiness to the Aztec dances since the steps were smaller and the movements were less forceful. Combining African styles along with the Native and European influences is what truly makes Latin possible.

The movement and rhythms of African influences left a permanent mark in Latin dance. When the African slaves were forced to Europe in the 1500s, their culture brought styles such as basic, simple movements (putting emphasis on the upper body, torso, or feet) and intricate movements like the coordination of different body parts and complex actions such as “fast rotation, ripples of the body, and contraction and release, as well as variations in dynamics, levels, and use of space.” The difference between the African and European styles was that it included bent knees and a downward focus (grounded to the earth) rather than a straight-backed upward focus like the Europeans, and whole-foot steps than toes and heels. These influences from African roots have allowed Latin dance to become what it is today.

== Development ==
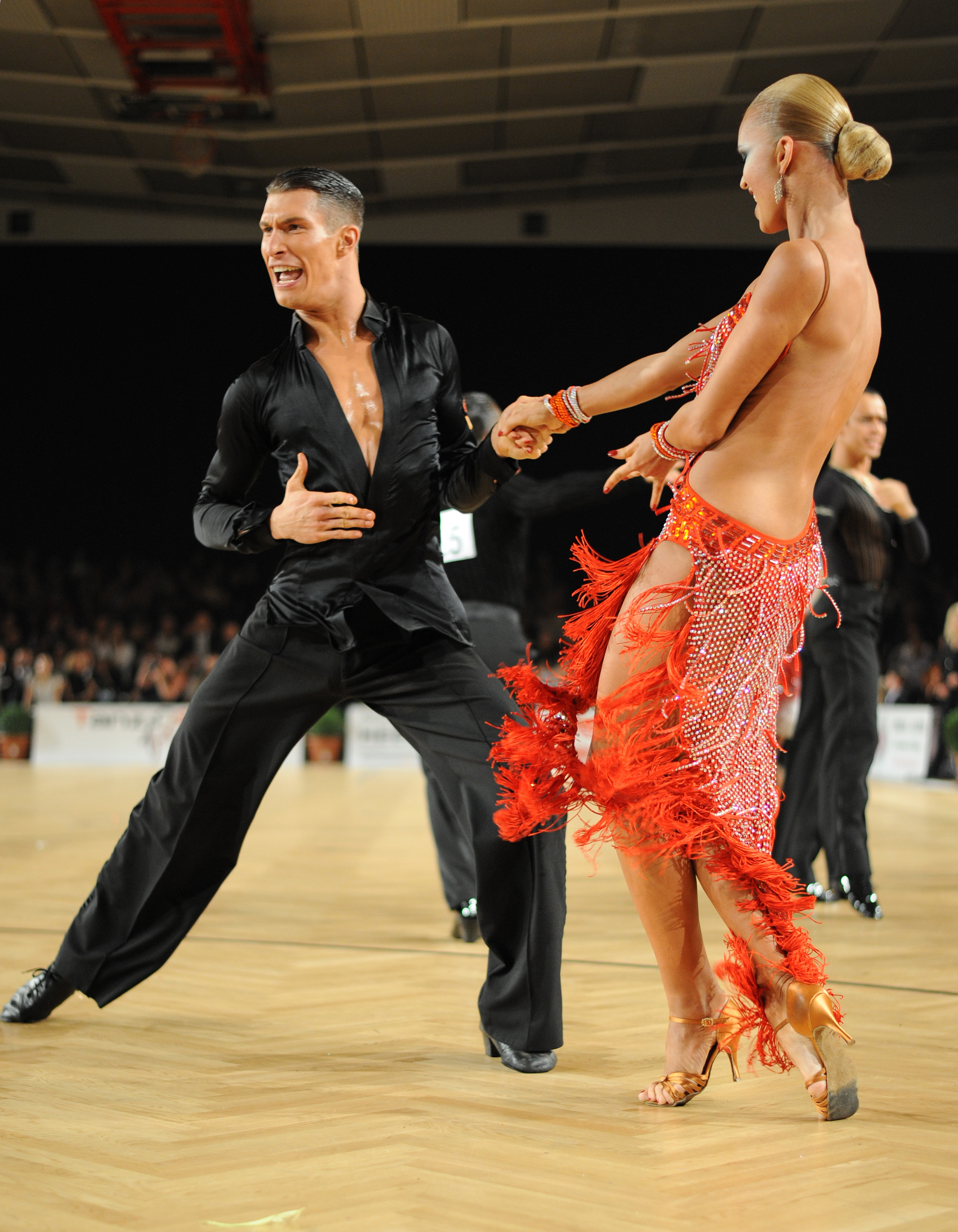
Cha-cha

Latin dance is a mix of various dance styles from cultures around the world, creating a dance style encompassing this new age of Latin culture. Influences deriving from West African, African American, and European dance styles were all comprised in the making of many of these Latin dances such as: Salsa, Mambo, Merengue, Rumba, Cha-cha-cha, Bachata, and Samba. Not only have these cultures shaped this style of dance, they've also shaped the music made in Latin America. Music became the engine for Latin dancing because it guided the dance steps with its measure, speed, and the feeling it evoked, from energetic to sensual. Many of these beats come from European folk music, West African beats, and African American jazz. Various Latin American regions developed independent styles, and from each genre, or combination of styles, a different genre was born. For example, the Mambo which was created in the 1940s emerged through the combination of American swing and Cuban Son music. Another example is the Romania and Egyptian cultural dance of belly dancing, which has traveled its way to Spain and gained its influence in the repertoire of the Latin dance known as flamenco due to the Moorish conquest of Iberia (Spain) in the Eighth-Century. Though Latin dance is a social dance that can be seen in Quinceañeras, parties, and in other social gatherings, there is no required cultural clothing required for this style of dancing. However, in the dance sport competition world of "Latin dance" each category in Latin dance has its own unique styled costumes along with it. Short rimmed dresses, fringe hems, a skirt or dress, braided hems, and boa feathers and flowers can be seen throughout costume designs.

== The modernization of Latin dance ==
Following the music, movement history, and the rhythms, Latin dance evolved over time and individual steps slowly shifted the repertoire of each dance. It has several different forms and many modernized styles which creates a problem because it is shifting away from its Native, European, and African roots. A popular aerobic dance class known as Zumba is said to be influenced by Latin rhythm and steps. However, there are disagreements among Latin dancers about whether Zumba is a true Latin dance.

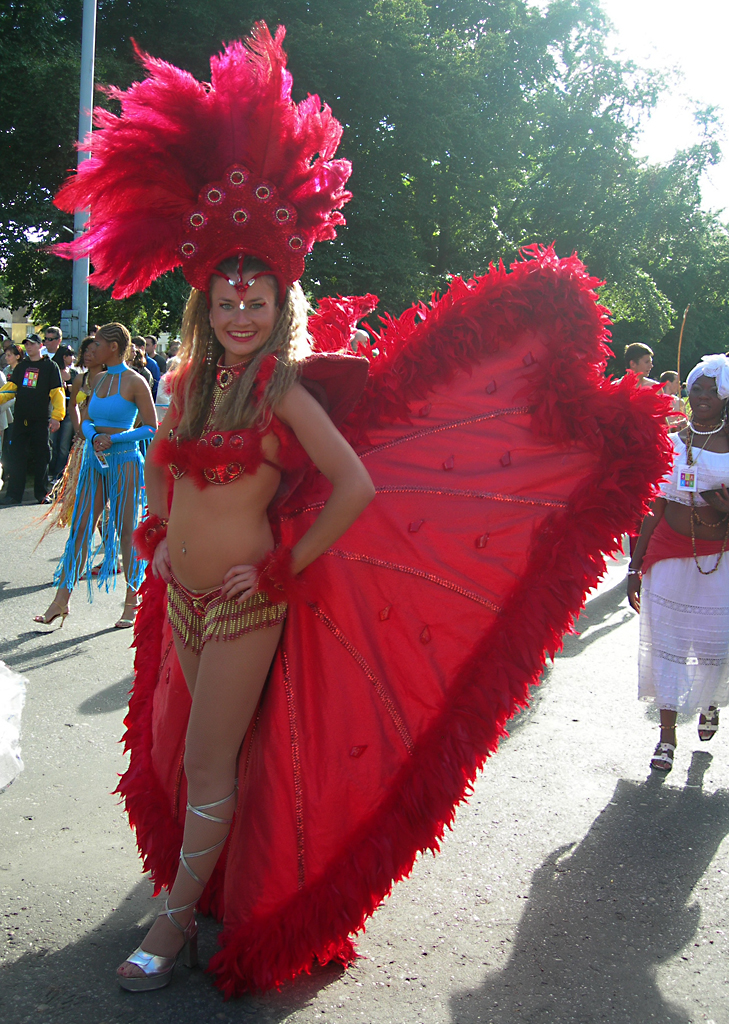
Samba Dancer

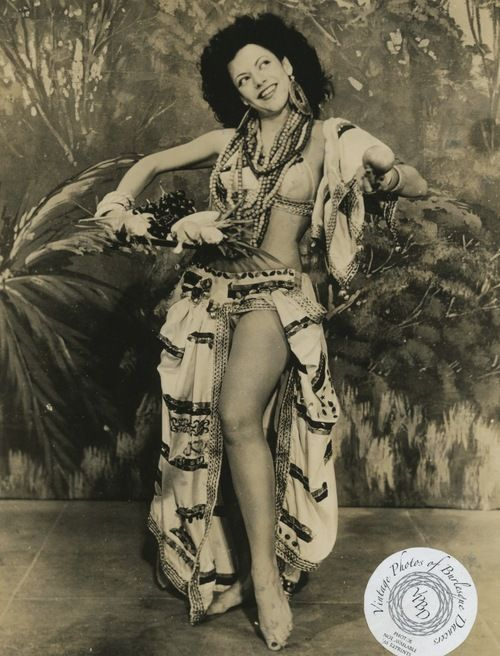
Amalia Aguilar Cuban-Mexican dancer and actress

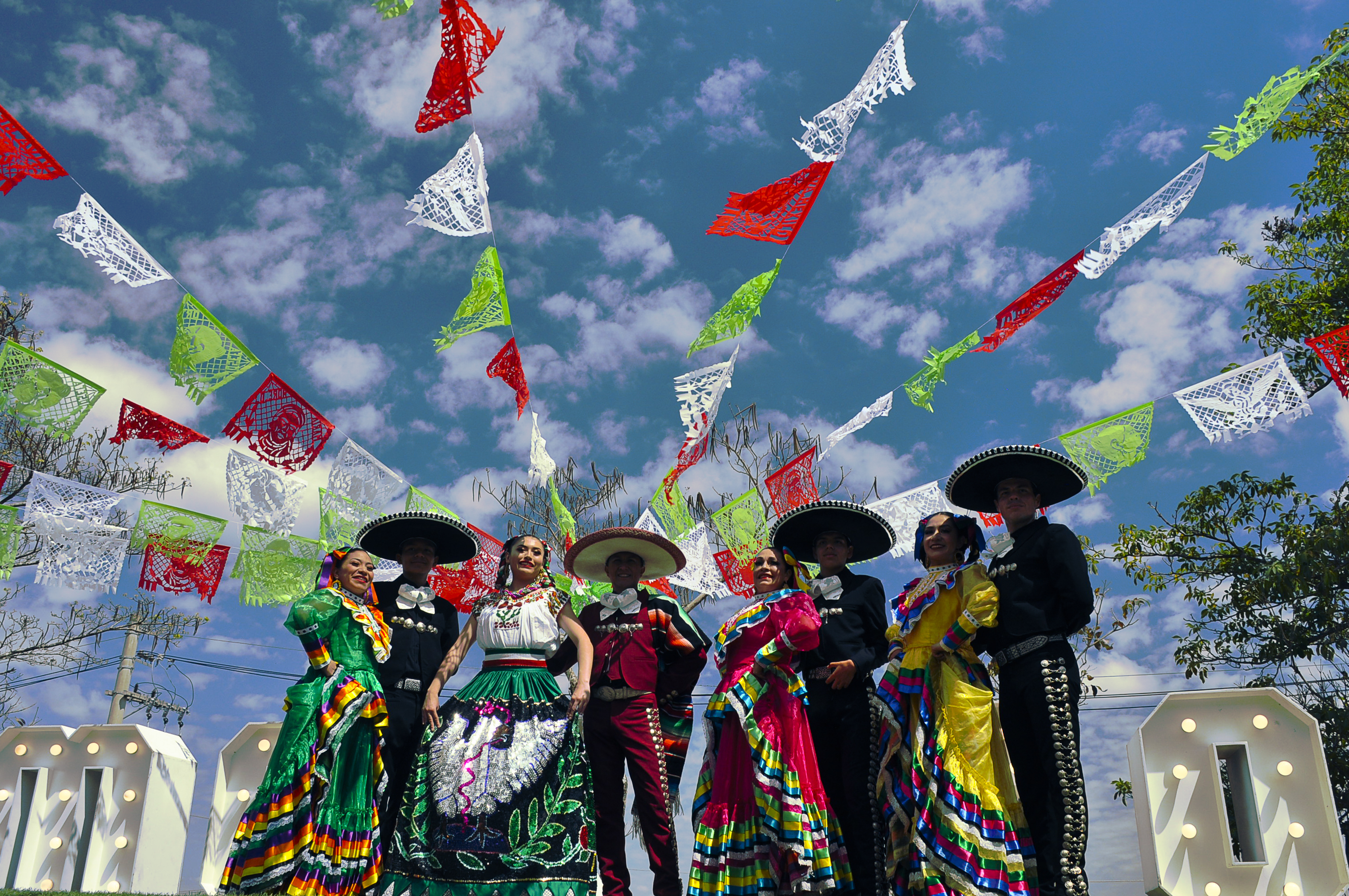
Jarabe Tapatío dancers

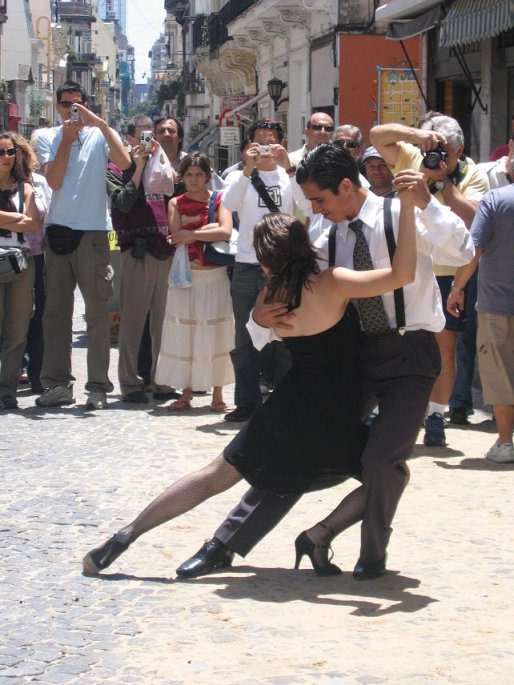
Tango

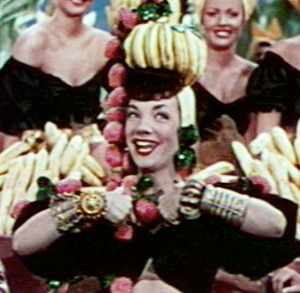
Carmen Miranda

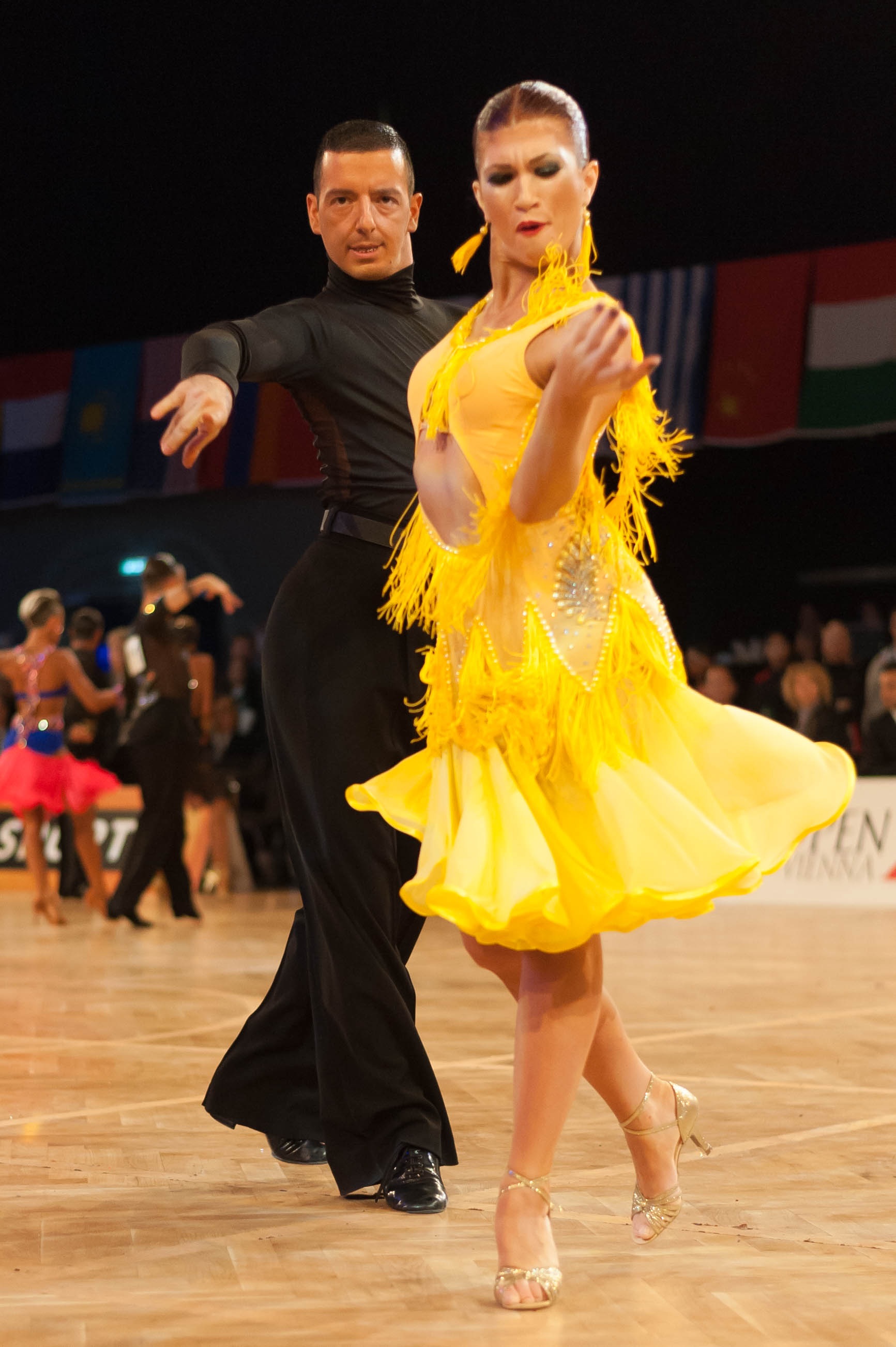
Young couple dancing cha-cha-cha at competitions in Austria.

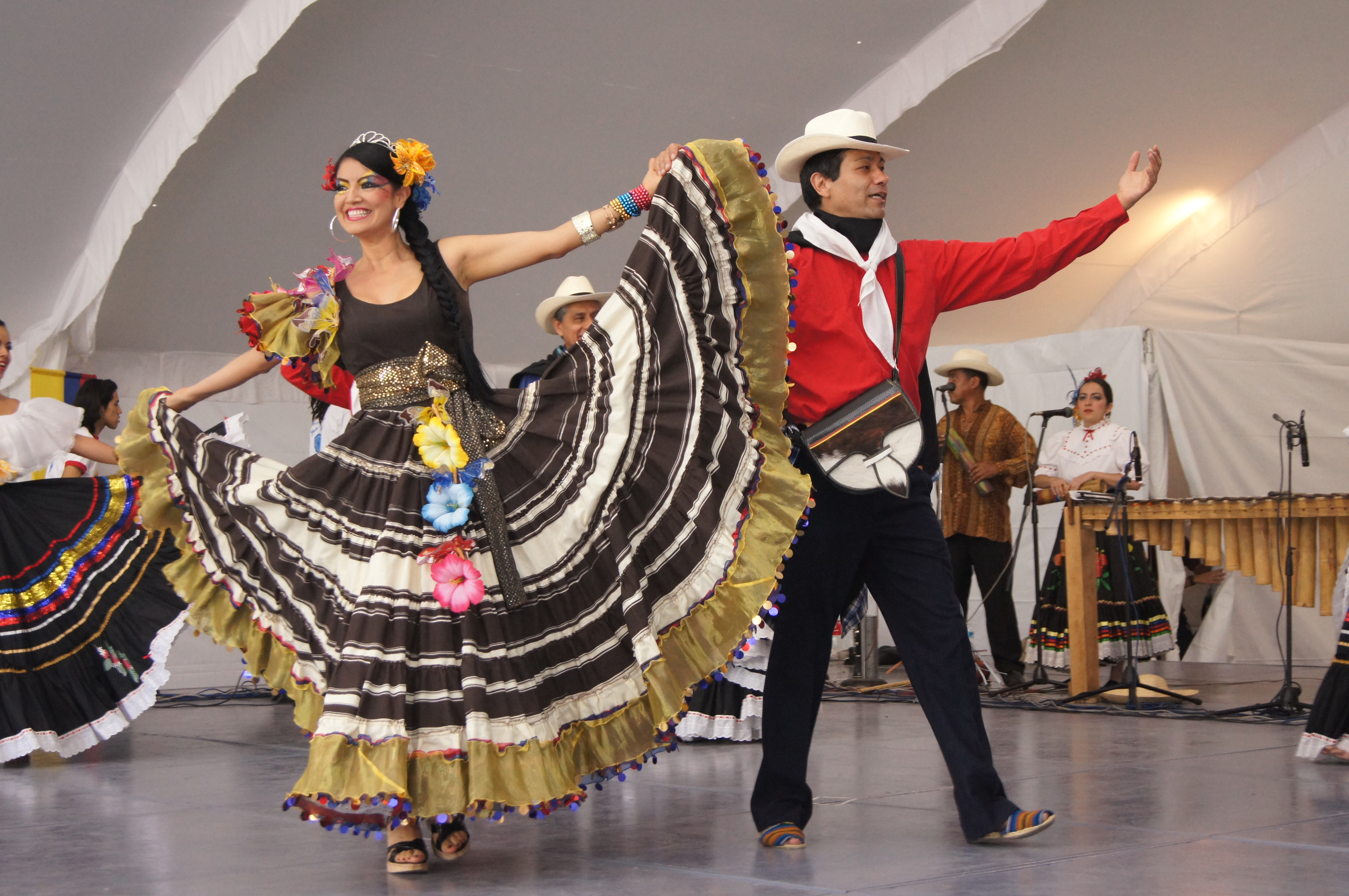
An example of folkloric dancing in Colombia

== See also ==
- International Latin American Dance Champions
- World Latin Dance Champions
