= 1991 Birthday Honours =

British government recognitions

The Birthday Honours 1991 for the United Kingdom and the other Commonwealth realms of Antigua and Barbuda, Bahamas, Belize, Grenada, New Zealand, Saint Lucia, Saint Vincent and the Grenadines, Solomon Islands, Tuvalu, were announced on 14 June 1991, to celebrate the Queen's Official Birthday of 1991.

The recipients of honours are displayed here as they were styled before their new honour, and arranged firstly by the country whose ministers advised the Queen on the appointments, then by honour, with classes (Knight, Knight Grand Cross, etc.) and then divisions (Military, Civil, etc.) as appropriate.

== United Kingdom ==
=== Life Peers ===
To be a Baroness

- Pauline Perry, Director, South Bank Polytechnic.

To be Barons

- Group Captain Geoffrey Leonard Cheshire, VC, OM, DSO, DFC, Founder of Cheshire Foundation Homes.
- Sir Norman (Somerville) Macfarlane, Chairman, Macfarlane Group plc.
- Professor Robert Jacob Alexander Skidelsky, Professor of International Studies, Warwick University.

=== Privy Counsellors ===
- Sir (Arthur) Paul Dean, MP, Deputy Chairman of Ways and Means. Member of Parliament for Woodspring.
- The Honourable Archibald Hamilton, MP, Minister of State for the Armed Forces, Ministry of Defence. Member of Parliament for Epsom and Ewell.
- Sir (Ieuan) Wyn (Pritchard) Roberts, MP, Minister of State, Welsh Office. Member of Parliament for Conwy.

=== Knights Bachelor ===
- Michael David Bishop, CBE, Chairman, British Midland Airways Ltd.
- Robin Wilson Buchanan, Chairman, Wessex Regional Health Authority.
- Robert Sidney Bunyard, CBE, QPM, Her Majesty's Inspector of Constabulary.
- David Charles Calcutt, QC. For public service.
- Philip David Carter, CBE, lately Chairman, Merseyside Development Corporation.
- Malcolm Hilbery Chaplin, CBE. For political service.
- The Right Honourable John (Ambrose) Cope, MP. For political service.
- Edward John Cullen, Chairman, Health and Safety Commission.
- Edward Thomas Downes, CBE, Conductor.
- (Albert) (Edward) Patrick Duffy, MP. For services to the North Atlantic Assembly.
- Malcolm David Field, Chairman, Navy, Army and Air Force Institutes. Managing Director, WH Smith Group plc.
- Anthony Keith Gill, Chairman and Chief Executive, Lucas Industries plc.
- Brian Lawrence Goswell. For political service.
- John Hall, Chairman, Cameron Hall Developments Ltd.
- Christopher George Francis Harding, Chairman, British Nuclear Fuels plc.
- John Theodore Houghton, CBE, Director General and Chief Executive, Meteorological Office.
- Robert Vidal Rhodes-James, MP. For political service.
- Michael Joughin, CBE, Chairman, Scottish Hydro-Electric plc.
- David Bryan Lees, Chairman and Chief Executive, GKN plc; Chairman, CBI Economic and Financial Committee.
- Peter Evelyn Leslie, Chairman, Export Guarantees Advisory Council, lately Deputy Chairman, Barclays Bank plc.
- Frederick Albert (Bert) Millichip, Chairman, The Football Association.
- Richard George Rogers. For services to Architecture.
- Joseph William Grenville Smith, Director, Public Health Laboratory Service.
- Professor Roland Smith, Chairman, British Aerospace.
- Harry Solomon, Chairman, Hillsdown Holdings plc.
- The Right Honourable Bernard Harold Ian Halley Stewart, MP, RD. For political service.
- Professor Malcolm Keith Sykes, Nuffield Professor of Anaesthetics, University of Oxford.
- Edward Macmillan (Teddy) Taylor, MP. For political service.
- Professor John Meurig Thomas, Director and Fullerian Professor of Chemistry, The Royal Institution; Director, Davy-Faraday Research Laboratory.
- Thomas James Thomson, CBE, Chairman, Greater Glasgow Health Board.
- Professor David Glyndwr Tudor Williams, Vice-Chancellor, University of Cambridge; President, Wolfson College, Cambridge.
- Professor Erik Christopher Zeeman, Principal, Hertford College, Oxford, and Gresham Professor of Geometry.

=== Order of the Bath (Military Division) ===
==== Knight Grand Cross (GCB) ====
Army

- General Sir Brian Kenny, KCB, CBE (437098), Colonel The Queen's Royal Irish Hussars, Colonel Commandant Royal Armoured Corps, Colonel Commandant Royal Army Veterinary Corps.

Royal Air Force

- Air Chief Marshal Sir David Parry-Evans, KCB, CBE.

==== Knights Commander (KCB) ====
Royal Navy

- Vice Admiral The Hon. Nicholas John Hill-Norton.
- Vice Admiral Hugo Moresby White, CBE.

Army

- Lieutenant General Peter Walter Graham, CBE (451249), Colonel The Gordon Highlanders, Colonel Commandant The Scottish Division.

Royal Air Force

- Air Marshal Charles John Thomson, CBE, AFC.
- Air Marshal Ronald Andrew Fellowes Wilson, CB, AFC.

==== Companions (CB) ====
Royal Navy

- Rear Admiral Douglas Morrison Dow.
- The Venerable Michael Harry George Henley, QHC.
- Rear Admiral James Frederick Thomas George Salt.

Army

- Major General Peter Robert Frank Bonnet, MBE (457109), Colonel Commandant Royal Regiment of Artillery.
- Major General Paul Sheldon Bray (448919), late Royal Army Pay Corps.
- Major General Anthony Bernard Crowfoot, CBE (448944), Colonel the Prince of Wales's Own Regiment of Yorkshire.
- Major General Graham Ben Fawcus (457162), late Corps of Royal Engineers.
- Major General Francis George Sugden, CBE (458186), late Corps of Royal Engineers.

Royal Air Force

- Air Vice-Marshal Christopher Paul Baker.
- Air Vice-Marshal David Cousins, AFC.
- Air Vice-Marshal Michael John Pilkington, CBE.

=== Order of the Bath (Civil Division) ===
==== Knights Commander (KCB) ====
- John Bryant Bourn, CB, Comptroller and Auditor General.
- Robert Russell Hillhouse, Permanent Under Secretary of State, Scottish Office.
- Edward Peter Kemp, CB, Second Permanent Secretary, Cabinet Office (Office of the Minister for the Civil Service).

==== Companions (CB) ====
- Kenneth Reginald Cooper, Chief Executive, The British Library.
- Frank Alan Elliott, Permanent Secretary, Department of Health and Social Services, Northern Ireland.
- Julian Faux, Grade 2, Ministry of Defence.
- Professor Francis Stanley Feates. Lately Grade 3, Department of the Environment.
- David Henry Jephson Hilary, Receiver, Metropolitan Police.
- Peter Benjamin Gurner Jones, Grade 3, Board of Inland Revenue.
- Christopher Thomas McDonnell, Deputy Under Secretary of State, Ministry of Defence.
- Peter McMaster, Director General and Chief Executive, Ordnance Survey.
- David Menhennet, Librarian, House of Commons.
- Clive Trevor Newton, Grade 3, Department of Trade and Industry.
- Frederic Adrian Osborn, Deputy Secretary, Department of the Environment.
- Graham Livingstone Reid, Deputy Secretary, Department of Employment.
- William George Sanders, Grade 3, Ministry of Defence.
- Michael Charles Scholar, Deputy Secretary, Her Majesty's Treasury.
- Geoffrey Bernard Sellers, Parliamentary Counsel.
- Godfrey Russell Sunderland, Deputy Secretary, Department of Transport.
- Alex Williams, lately Government Chemist, Laboratory of the Government Chemist.
- Gerald Robertson Wilson, Secretary, Scottish Office Education Department.

=== Saint Michael and Saint George ===
==== Companion (CMG) ====
- The Right Reverend John Richard Satterthwaite, Bishop of Gibraltar in Europe.

=== Royal Victorian Order ===
==== Knights Commander (KCVO) ====
- Major David Henry Butter, MC.
- David Burdett Money-Coutts.
- Roger de Grey, President of the Royal Academy.
- Colonel Martin St John Valentine Gibbs, CB, DSO, TD, JP.

==== Commanders (CVO) ====
- Sir David Frederick Attenborough, CBE.
- The Reverend Canon Anthony Douglass Caesar, LVO, MA, MusB, FRCO.
- Oliver William Everett, LVO.
- William Oliver Farrer.
- John Brook Marriott, LVO.
- Rear-Admiral (Basil Charles) Godfrey Place, VC, CB, DSC.
- Philip Sandeman Ziegler.

==== Lieutenants (LVO) ====
- Wing Commander Peter Basil Akehurst, RAF.
- John Joseph Crowley.
- Michael Tom Fishlock.
- Anne Tennant, Baroness Glenconner.
- Clare Veronica Wilmot-Sitwell.
- John James Taylor.
- Peter Dudley Yorke.

==== Members (MVO) ====
- Stephanie Anne Barry.
- Betty Chalmers.
- Stuart Jonathan Holmes.
- Squadron Leader Graham Harvey Laurie, RAF.
- Major John Cooper Leech.
- Patricia Pentney.
- Chief Inspector Philip Robinson, Metropolitan Police.
- Guy Salter.
- Inspector Colin Harry Tebbutt, Metropolitan Police.
- Douglas Thomas.
- Commander Alistair Fraser Lindsay Watson, RN.
- John Young.

=== Bar to the Royal Victorian Medal (RVM) ===
- Lawrence Hardy, RVM.

=== Royal Victorian Medal (RVM) ===
- Chief Technician Andre Robin Bird (LSI12106), A. TECH A, RAF.
- Petty Officer Steward Derek John Bond (D139155M), RN.
- Harold Brown.
- Petty Officer Steward (Royal Yacht Service) Stephen Frederick Green (D134152Q), RN.
- Ronald Hurst.
- Norman Gerard Lawrence.
- Frederick William Searle.
- Chief Technician Thomas John Taylor (N1962056), A. TECH A, RAF.
- James Walton.
- Albert Charles Wenban.
- Tony Whittle.

=== Order of the British Empire (Military Division) ===
==== Knight Grand Cross (GBE) ====
Royal Navy

- Admiral Sir (John) Jeremy Black, KCB, DSO, MBE, ADC.

==== Commanders (CBE) ====
Royal Navy

- Captain Stephen Henry Graham Johnston.
- Commodore Douglas George Littlejohns, OBE.
- Captain Walter Bernard Thrush.
- Captain David Wright.

Army

- Colonel Christopher Robin Burson (468310), late Royal Regiment of Artillery.
- Brigadier Alan Fleetwood Gordon (463342), late Royal Regiment of Artillery.
- Brigadier Denis Ronald Higginbotham (453488), Royal Pioneer Corps.
- Brigadier Charles Roland Sykes Notley (461481), late The Royal Scots Dragoon Guards (Carabiniers and Greys).
- Colonel Andrew Robert Douglas Pringle, MBE. (482810), late The Royal Green Jackets.
- Brigadier Anthony Graham Staniforth (445979), late Corps of Royal Electrical and Mechanical Engineers.
- Colonel Timothy William Terry, MBE.(474070), late Royal Tank Regiment.
- Brigadier Charles Anthony Gilbert Wells (467645), late 15th/19th The King's Royal Hussars.

Royal Air Force

- Group Captain Geoffrey Leaver.
- Air Commodore Kenneth John Lovett.
- Air Commodore Gordon Harry Edward Mitchell, MBE.
- Group Captain Steven Mark Nicholl, AFC.

==== Officers (OBE) ====
Royal Navy

- Commander Geoffrey Ronald Bartlett.
- Commander Fabian Henry Hiscock.
- Commander Rory Alistair Ian McLean.
- Local Lieutenant Colonel Christopher John Menheneott, Royal Marines.
- Commander John Gilbert Perakis Phillips.
- Commander Michael Henry Porter, RD*, Royal Naval Reserve.
- Commander Michael John Reeves.
- Commander Nicholas James Regan.
- Commander Robert Wakeham Tucker.
- Captain Brian James Waters, Royal Fleet Auxiliary Service.
- Commander Anthony Charles Young.

Army

- Lieutenant Colonel John Robin Berry (506695), Intelligence Corps.
- Lieutenant Colonel Timothy Richard Bradwell (481730), Corps of Royal Engineers.
- Lieutenant Colonel Bruce James Burgess (473899), Royal Corps of Transport.
- Lieutenant Colonel Cedric James Burton (489500), Royal Corps of Signals.
- Lieutenant Colonel Richard Seymour Corkran (451214), Grenadier Guards.
- Lieutenant Colonel John Jeremy Dumas (472255), Royal Regiment of Artillery.
- Lieutenant Colonel David Edward Forrest (495017), Royal Corps of Transport.
- Lieutenant Colonel Christopher Vladimir Froehlich (476515), Royal Corps of Transport.
- Lieutenant Colonel Ian Wallace Fulton (484993), Corps of Royal Military Police.
- Lieutenant Colonel Euan Henry Houstoun, MBE. (476876), Grenadier Guards.
- Lieutenant Colonel Eric Andrew Coutts Ironside, TD. (460836), The Parachute Regiment, Territorial Army.
- Lieutenant Colonel Vincent Gerald Iwanek (484887), Corps of Royal Engineers.
- Lieutenant Colonel Terence Joseph Magee (506229), Royal Army Medical Corps.
- Lieutenant Colonel Christopher George Patey (485800), Royal Tank Regiment.
- Lieutenant Colonel George Beverley Smalley, TD. (489638), The Yorkshire Volunteers, Territorial Army.
- Acting Colonel Iain Scott Taylor, TD. (438876), Army Cadet Force, Territorial Army.
- Lieutenant Colonel Roger Charles Thayne (495720), Royal Army Medical Corps.
- Lieutenant Colonel Crichton Stuart Wakelin (484050), The Staffordshire Regiment (The Prince of Wales's).

Royal Air Force

- Wing Commander Richard John Colver (4232477).
- Wing Commander Patrick Terence Davies (2544543).
- Wing Commander Stanley Charles Fuller, BEM. (5201481).
- Wing Commander Malcolm Gleave, MBE. (4232774).
- Squadron Leader John Michael Henson, MBE. (4231507).
- Wing Commander Norman Mavor Macleod (8023033).
- Wing Commander Timothy James Pink, MBE. (5201961).
- Wing Commander David Christopher Roome (4232632).
- Wing Commander (now Group Captain) Arthur Stewart Torode (0507748).
- Wing Commander William Michael Watkins (5011165).

==== Members (MBE) ====
Royal Navy

- Lieutenant Commander John Christopher Archer.
- Temporary Acting Captain (E) Peter John Beer, Royal Fleet Auxiliary Service.
- Lieutenant (CS) Henry John Bell.
- Lieutenant Commander David Patrick Foster.
- Lieutenant Commander Peter Andrew Francis Grant.
- Warrant Officer David Nelson Greig.
- Lieutenant Philip Steven Hoper.
- Warrant Officer Michael John Morris.
- Warrant Officer 1 John Kenneth Palmer, Royal Marines.
- Warrant Officer Anthony David Parkinson.
- Warrant Officer Nathan James Prince.
- Lieutenant Commander Peter Robert Rundle.
- Lieutenant Commander Stephen John Southgate.
- Acting Lieutenant Commander Jonathan Simon Westbrook.
- Lieutenant Commander Brian Frank Witts.
- Superintending Nursing Officer Isobel Easton Young, ARRC, Queen Alexandra's Royal Naval Nursing Service.

Army

- Major (Queen's Gurkha Officer) Balkrishnarai, MVO, BEM, (512284), Queen's Gurkha Signals.
- 23942160 Warrant Officer Class 1 (now Lieutenant) Trevor Roy Beswick, Royal Regiment of Artillery.
- Major Paul Bradley (479452), The Light Infantry, Territorial Army.
- 24123745 Warrant Officer Class 1 Stephen Paul Byford, Royal Regiment of Artillery.
- Major John Robert Orion Calver (480261), Royal Army Education Corps.
- Major Adrian Patrick Collins (497390), Corps of Royal Military Police.
- Captain Donald Patrick Cormack (485625), Royal Regiment of Artillery, Territorial Army.
- Captain Christopher Michael Deverell (509168), Royal Tank Regiment.
- 24047907 Warrant Officer Class 2 Michael Timothy Doran, Corps of Royal Engineers.
- Major Colin Andrew Findlay (500092), Corps of Royal Military Police.
- Major Trevor Stuart Finklaire (495167), The Royal Hampshire Regiment.
- Major Bernard Sarjeant Fitzjohn, TD, (436796), Intelligence Corps, Territorial Army.
- Major Simon James Fleet (507440), Royal Corps of Transport.
- Major Denis Gardner (501328), Royal Army Medical Corps, Territorial Army.
- Captain Gillian Margaret Gibson (511457), Corps of Royal Electrical and Mechanical Engineers.
- Captain Maurice Ronald Mackenzie Gibson (504456), The Gordon Highlanders.
- Captain Stevyn Denzil Gibson (513595), Corps of Royal Engineers.
- Major Thomas Godwin (506253), The Parachute Regiment.
- Major James Henry Gordon (504457), The Royal Green Jackets.
- Major Martin Graham (510512), The Royal Scots Dragoon Guards (Carabiniers and Greys).
- Major Timothy John Gregson (501010), The Light Infantry.
- Captain Stephen David Hambrook, GM, (496151), Corps of Royal Engineers, Territorial Army.
- 23944840 Warrant Officer Class 2 Michael John Hopkins, Intelligence Corps.
- Lieutenant James Colin John (535447), The Royal Regiment of Wales (24th/41st Foot).
- Major Maurice John Joyce (517561), Grenadier Guards.
- Captain Arthur Russell Kay (523722), The Queen's Lancashire Regiment.
- 24121539 Warrant Officer Class 2 David Melvin Longstaff, Royal Army Medical Corps.
- Captain (now Major) Jeffrey Lyman (519310), Royal Tank Regiment.
- 23879172 Warrant Officer Class 1 Alan George Mason, Coldstream Guards.
- 22165041 Warrant Officer Class 2 Thomas McCormick, Royal Regiment of Artillery, Territorial Army.
- Major William Andrew McCracken, MC, (501653), Royal Regiment of Artillery.
- Major Gordon Muir (514210), Small Arms School Corps.
- Major Paul Thomas Musgrove (497476), Corps of Royal Electrical and Mechanical Engineers.
- Major (now Lieutenant Colonel) Michael Charles Parish (494663), The King's Regiment.
- Major David Ralph Potts (501678), Royal Regiment of Artillery.
- Major John Henry Vereker Prendergast (470132), Royal Tank Regiment.
- Major Ian John Rodley (505904), Royal Tank Regiment.
- Major Stuart Louis Sessions (498288), 2nd King Edward VII's Own Gurkha Rifles (The Sirmoor Rifles).
- Acting Major William George Barnett Shiels (489383), Army Cadet Force, Territorial Army.
- Major David Michael Munro Stevenson (495383), The Devonshire and Dorset Regiment.
- 23702312 Warrant Officer Class 2 Martin Lockhart Thompson, The Royal Irish Rangers (27th (Inniskilling) 83rd and 87th), Territorial Army.
- Major Samuel John Venus (516675), The Duke of Edinburgh's Royal Regiment (Berkshire and Wiltshire).
- 24119595 Warrant Officer Class 1 Marvin Walden, Royal Army Ordnance Corps.
- Major David Michael Walker (509360), General List, Territorial Army.
- 24166373 Warrant Officer Class 2 James McCann Graham Wilson, Royal Corps of Transport.
- 24144482 Warrant Officer Class 1 Keith Charles Wynn, Royal Army Ordnance Corps.

Royal Air Force

- Squadron Leader Susan Elizabeth Armitage-Maddox (8032085), Women's Royal Air Force.
- Squadron Leader Colin Nigel Blagrove (5203534).
- Flight Lieutenant Lawrence Alfred Briar (3155805), Royal Air Force Volunteer Reserve (Training).
- Squadron Leader John David Treverton Butterworth (0587666).
- Warrant Officer Leslie Charles Chapman (A2637197), Royal Auxiliary Air Force Regiment.
- Squadron Leader David John Cairns Crombie (4232631).
- Flying Officer Brian Thomas Dunleavy (8097032).
- Warrant Officer Brian Charles Durston (R1947941).
- Flight Lieutenant Andrew Ian Farmer (5204627).
- Squadron Leader David Alan Foulger (0608543).
- Squadron Leader Samuel John Gibson (0688874), (Retired).
- Warrant Officer David Griffith Harries (D0587960).
- Warrant Officer Rodney Alan Ludlow (S1930997).
- Squadron Leader John Robert Mann (2623350).
- Warrant Officer Michael James Marriott (K4176939).
- Warrant Officer David Rennie Munro (B4284959), Royal Air Force Regiment.
- Warrant Officer John Pattison (G4249304).
- Warrant Officer Patrick Joseph Pumphry (Q5082137).
- Squadron Leader John Hugh Ross (1920948).
- Warrant Officer Barry Arthur Sears (H0681873).
- Squadron Leader Stephen John Taylor (8098610).
- Flight Lieutenant Derek Arthur John Warby (5204042).
- Squadron Leader Jeffrey Leonard Whitehead (3519411).
- Flight Lieutenant James Robert Williams (2378045), Royal Air Force Volunteer Reserve (Training).

=== Order of the British Empire (Civil Division) ===
==== Dames Commander (DBE) ====
- Gwen Ffrangcon-Davies. For services to Acting.
- Dione Marian, Lady Digby, DL. For services to the Arts.

==== Commanders (CBE) ====
- Gary James Allen, Managing Director and Chief Executive, IMI plc.
- John Wulf Allenby, Deputy Chairman, Lansing Linde Ltd.
- William Everett Allison, lately Grade 5, Department of Energy.
- Margaret Barbour, Chairman, J. Barbour and Sons Ltd. For services to Export.
- John William Beresford. For services to the Scout Association.
- Professor Christopher Blake, Chairman, Glenrothes Development Corporation.
- Arthur Thomas Booth, Chairman, South and East Cheshire Training and Enterprise Council; Chairman, Refuge Group plc.
- Alan Charles Nelson Borg, Director General, Imperial War Museum.
- Donald Boulter, Professor of Botany, University of Durham.
- David Gordon Murdoch Boyd, Managing Director, GOAL Petroleum.
- Christopher David Brickell, Director General, Royal Horticultural Society.
- George Bundred, D.L. For public service in Merseyside.
- Jeffery Burley, Director, Oxford Forestry Institute.
- Roger Stephen Burman, Chairman and Managing Director, Teledictor Ltd. For services to Export.
- David Edgeworth Butler, Fellow, Nuffield College, University of Oxford.
- Henry Ernest Carter, Doctor of Veterinary Medicine. For services to the Veterinary Profession.
- Raymond John Carter, Member, Interim Advisory Council; Director and Executive, Marathon Oil Co.
- Poul Adrian Christensen, Member, Commercial Management Board, Agricultural Development and Advisory Service.
- Frank Clark, General Manager, Lanarkshire Health Board.
- Henry Stephen Cobb, Clerk of the Records, House of Lords.
- David Colvin, lately Chief Social Work Adviser, Scottish Office.
- Professor David Daiches. For services to Literature.
- Eric Dancer, Chairman, Devon and Cornwall Training and Enterprise Council; Managing Director, Dartington Crystal.
- Peter Munn Dines, Secretary, School Examinations and Assessment Council.
- Kenneth Douglas, Chairman, Board of Governors, Sunderland Polytechnic.
- George Findley, Senior Principal Inspector of Taxes, Board of Inland Revenue.
- Anthony Fish, Member, Advisory Committee on Research and Development.
- Gerda Flockinger, Artist/Jeweller.
- Donald William Ford, Chairman, TWIL Ltd.
- Professor Arthur John Forty, Principal and Vice-Chancellor, Stirling University.
- Cedric Arthur Fullwood, Chief Probation Officer, Greater Manchester.
- James Douglas Gadd, Chairman, GEC Alsthom. For services to Export.
- Wilson Gamble, lately Chairman and Chief Executive, Labour Relations Agency.
- Peter Noel Gerrard, lately Senior Partner, Lovell White Durrant.
- Professor Norman James Gibson, Pro Vice-Chancellor, University of Ulster.
- Neville Clive Goldrein. For political and public service.
- Jean Muriel Goose, Grade 5, Home Office.
- Allan Graham Gormly, Director, Trafalgar House plc; Managing Director, John Brown plc. For services to Export.
- Margaret Ethel Grainger, O.B.E., President, Occupational Pensions Advisory Service.
- Eric Benjamin Granshaw, Grade 5, Department of Education and Science.
- Professor George William Gray, Consultant, MERCK Ltd.
- Arthur Jeffrey Greenwell, Chief Executive, Northamptonshire County Council.
- Denis Walter Greenwood. For political and public service.
- Colonel Antony Bailey Griffiths, T.D., D.L., Chairman, West Midlands, Territorial Auxiliary and Volunteer Reserve Association.
- William Hall, DFC, Member, Lands Tribunal for Scotland.
- David Constable Hobson, Member, Building Societies Commission.
- Derek Andrew Howe. For political service.
- John Bernard Lloyd Howell, Professor of Medicine, University of Southampton. President, British Medical Association.
- Rupert Paul Sylvester Hughes, Grade 5, Department of Health.
- George Harrison Inglis, Managing Director and Board Member, Urenco Group.
- Julia Mary Walden-Jones, National Vice-Chairman, Women's Royal Voluntary Service.
- Professor Elie Kedourie, lately Professor of Politics, University of London.
- David John Kenny, lately General Manager, North West Thames Regional Health Authority.
- (John) Martin Kirby Laing, D.L., Chairman, John Laing plc. For services to Export.
- Alan James Lewis, Chairman and Chief Executive, Illingworth Morris plc.
- Roy Nigel Lewis, Collector, HM Board of Customs and Excise.
- Martyn Howard Long, D.L., Chairman, Mid Downs Health Authority.
- Jean, Lady Mackenzie, Chairman, Royal United Kingdom Beneficent Association.
- Calum Alexander Macleod. For services to industry in Scotland.
- David Ronald Male, Joint Senior Partner, Gardiner and Theobald.
- Jack Craig McDougall, Director of Architectural and Related Services, Strathclyde Regional Council.
- Desmond McMullan, Director of Operations, Northern Ireland Prison Service.
- John Sinclair Morrison. For services to the Study of Ancient Greece.
- The Countess Mountbatten of Burma, D.L., Chairman, Joint Committee, Order of St John and British Red Cross Society; Vice-President, British Red Cross Society.
- Thomas Murphy, Managing Director, Civil Aviation Authority.
- Harry Morton Neal, Chairman, City and Guilds of London Institute.
- James Allan Nightingale, Chairman, Apparel, Knitting and Textile Alliance.
- William Nimmo. For political service.
- Peter John O'Sullevan, O.B.E. For services to Horse Racing.
- David Owen, Q.P.M., Chief Constable, North Wales Police.
- Mervyn Hugh Phillips, Chief Executive, Clwyd County Council; Secretary, Assembly of Welsh Councils.
- William George Poeton. For political service.
- James Forrest Porter, Director General, The Commonwealth Institute.
- Geoffrey Heddon Potter, lately Senior Partner and Chairman, Frank Graham and Partners.
- Simon James Crawford Randall, Chairman, Housing and Social Services Committee, London Boroughs Association.
- Michael Ring, lately Grade 5, Ministry of Agriculture, Fisheries and Food.
- Anthony John Roberts, Chairman, South Thames Training and Enterprise Council; Managing Director, Post Office Counters.
- Professor Norman Robert Ban Robertson, Dean of the Dental School, University of Wales College of Medicine.
- Dennis Frederick Robins, Q.F.S.M., Territorial Inspector (Grade 1), HM Fire Service Inspectorate.
- Kenneth Paul Robinson, lately Assistant Managing Director, GEC-Marconi Ltd.
- William David Crowe Semple, Director of Education, Lothian Regional Council.
- John Herbert Subak-Sharpe, Professor of Virology, University of Glasgow, Honorary Director MRC Virology Unit.
- Professor John Rankin Small, Commission for Local Authority Accounts in Scotland.
- John Frank Monton Smallwood, Chairman, City Parochial Foundation. For services to the Church of England.
- Arthur David Gerald Smart, Emeritus Professor, Urban Planning, University of London.
- Marion Hildick-Smith, Consultant Physician in Geriatric Medicine, Kent and Canterbury Hospital.
- Jeffery John Mumford Speed. For political service.
- Michael Hilary Spence, Director of Strategic Development, Dowty Group plc.
- Reginald Hawkins Streeten, Head of Statute Law Revision, Law Commission.
- Victor Tarnofsky, Assistant Comptroller, Patent Office, Department of Trade and Industry.
- Trevor Charles Thomas, Deputy National Manager, Unilever.
- Graham Norman Tope. For political and public service.
- Professor Victor Brownlie Torrance, William Watson Professor of Building Heriot-Watt University.
- Garry Turvey, Director General, Freight Transport Association.
- Sarah Elizabeth Royle Walker (Mrs Allum), Opera Singer.
- Richard Trevor Turner-Warwick, Senior Surgeon, The Middlesex Hospital, and The Institute of Urology.
- Cyril Washbrook. For services to Cricket.
- Keith Spencer Waterhouse, Author and Columnist.
- Billie Honor Whitelaw (Mrs Muller), Actress
- Peter Orchard Williams, Director, The Wellcome Trust.
- William Eric Wilson, Director General, Federation of Agricultural Co-operatives (UK) Ltd.
- John David Woods, Director, Marine and Atmospheric Sciences, Natural Environment Research Council.
- Paul Brook Woods, H.M. Deputy Chief Inspector, Nuclear Installations, Health and Safety Executive.
- Ronald William Wootton, lately Grade 5, Overseas Development Administration.
- Ian Humphrey Nelson Yates, lately General Manager and Chief Executive, The Press Association Ltd.

==== Officers (OBE) ====
- Kenneth Barry Smale-Adams, Chairman, Governors, Camborne School of Mines.
- (Rosemary) Hester Agate, lately Secretary, Suffolk Historic Churches Trust.
- Professor Leslie Alcock. For services to Archaeology.
- John Harry Archibald, HM Principal Inspector of Mines, Health and Safety Executive.
- Shirley Ardener, Director, Centre for Cross Cultural Research on Women, International Development Centre, Queen Elizabeth House, Oxford University.
- Ruth Mary Ashton (Mrs. Henschel), General Secretary, Royal College of Midwives.
- David Anthony Ayres, Chairman, Advance Tapes (International) Ltd. For services to Export.
- Mary Jean Baines, Consultant Physician, St. Christopher's Hospice, London.
- Oliver Ball, Chairman, Multiple Sclerosis Society of Great Britain and Northern Ireland.
- Peter Maxwell Ball, Director of Operations, Engineering Employers Federation.
- Audrey Joan Bambra. For services to Sport and Physical Recreation.
- Donald Christopher Barber. For services to Jazz.
- Lawrence Batley. For services to the National Art Education Archive.
- David Bayliss, Director of Planning, London Transport.
- James Lester Beeching, TD. For political and public service.
- John Muir Bell, Messenger-at-Arms and Sheriff Officer, Glasgow.
- Jane Elliott Benson, LVO, Appeal Organiser, Courtauld Institute of Art Fund.
- Ian Dennis Gray Berwick, Director General, United Kingdom Petroleum Industry Association.
- Eric Bielby, Chairman, Association of District Councils Environment Committee. Member, Beverley District Council.
- John Clyde Goodfellow Binfield. For services to the Community in Sheffield and For services to the YMCA.
- Anthony Patrick Michael Bird, Deputy Chairman and Joint Managing Director, The Bird Group of Companies.
- Geoffrey John Blumenthal, Group Leader Architect, Warwickshire County Council.
- Anne Marie Bohm, Part-time External Relations Consultant, London School of Economics.
- Valerie Bourne, Director, Dance Umbrella.
- Harold William Briley, lately World Service Defence Correspondent, British Broadcasting Corporation.
- John Bromley, Sports Producer, Independent Television and Channel 4.
- Ivan Douglas Brown, Assistant Director, Applied Psychology Unit, Medical Research Council.
- David Brunnschweiler, lately Group Managing Director, Cosmopolitan Holdings Ltd.
- Julian Medforth Budden. For services to Opera.
- John Leonard Burbidge, Visiting Professor, Cranfield Institute of Technology.
- John Haddon Button, Chief Executive Director, West Glamorgan Health Authority.
- Michael Ferdinand Callery, County Surveyor and Bridgemaster, Lancashire County Council.
- Ernest Thomas Cantle, Director General, National Home Improvement Council.
- Michael Duncan Chartres. For political and public service.
- Brian Howard Clough, Manager, Nottingham Forest Football Club. For services to Association Football.
- Brian Brook Coldwell, Chief Executive, Teesside Tomorrow.
- Thomas Coldwell, lately Grade 6, Ministry of Defence.
- Joy Elizabeth Cole, Director, Dorset County Branch, British Red Cross Society.
- Douglas Stuart Ralph Coltart, Chief Executive, East Berkshire Motor Trade Consortium Ltd.
- John Morris Connell, Chairman, Noise Abatement Society.
- Andrea Cook, Director, Neighbourhood Energy Action.
- Eric George Coombs, Grade 7, Ministry of Defence.
- Patrick Henry Douglas Crichton, TD. For services to The Queen Elizabeth Foundation for the Disabled, Surrey.
- Edward Crooks, Superintendent Specialist Inspector, Health and Safety Executive.
- Richard Francis Cunningham, lately Secretary, Catholic Education Council.
- Audrey Anne Dawson, Consultant Haematologist, Grampian Health Board.
- Desmond John Day, Under Secretary Pastoral, Church Commissioners.
- James McCulloch York Dickens, Chief Personnel Officer, Agricultural and Food Research Council.
- John Dickie, lately Diplomatic Correspondent, Daily Mail.
- Raymond Dickinson, Deputy Secretary, Royal Pharmaceutical Society of Great Britain.
- James Donald Driver, Non-Executive Chairman, Meggitt plc.
- Charles Edward Eckersley, Proprietor, Moray Seafoods Ltd, Buckie.
- Dennis Joseph Enright, Poet and Writer.
- Lawrence George Evans, lately Director, Integrated Systems, Marconi Defence Systems Ltd, Stanmore.
- Alan Reed Fairley, Managing Director, Port of Tyne Authority.
- Pauline Mary Farrell, lately Director, Social Services, Sefton Metropolitan Borough Council.
- Professor Morag Cameron Faulds. For services in the field of social work and social welfare in Scotland.
- Edward Spencer Faulkner, QFSM, Chief Fire Officer, Hertfordshire Fire and Rescue Service.
- Neil Frederick Ferguson, Grade 7, Department of Social Security.
- Ann Cecilia Fleming, Area Organiser, Devon, Dorset, Cornwall and Somerset Women's Royal Voluntary Service.
- Elizabeth Ann Frye, Grade 6, Department of Transport.
- Robert Kerr (Rikki) Fulton, Actor and Entertainer.
- Moyna Patricia Gilbertson, lately Executive Director, Association for Spina Bifida and Hydrocephalus.
- Thomas Robert Glover. For political and public service.
- Ian Gordon. For political and public service.
- James Lowery Graham, Managing Director, Border Television.
- John Patrick Greene, Director, Museum of Science and Industry, Manchester.
- David Gwyn Griffiths, Director of Land Reclamation, Welsh Development Agency.
- Edward Giles Griffiths. For services to Agriculture.
- William Gwyn Griffiths, Senior Medical Officer, Department of Health.
- Valerie Guttsman. For services to the Community in Norwich and Norfolk.
- Wing Commander Norman Patrick Watkins Hancock, DFC. For services to the Battle of Britain Fighter Association.
- Professor Wynne Harlen, Director, Scottish Council for Research in Education.
- Ernest Sanderson Harper, Member, Police Authority for Northern Ireland.
- Anthony George Harris, Principal, Harper Adams Agricultural College.
- Kenneth Ernest Harris, MBE. For political service.
- Archibald Oliver Hays, Assistant Chief Constable, Royal Ulster Constabulary.
- Jean Georgiana Heneage, Vice-President, Lincolnshire Branch, Soldiers', Sailors' and Airmen's Families Association.
- Terence Higgins, President, Sand and Gravel Association Ltd.
- Roy Howard Hill, Counselling Adviser, South East Region, Small Firms Service.
- Professor Alan William Holmes, lately Director, Leatherhead Food Research Association.
- John Horn, Inspector of Taxes (SP), Board of Inland Revenue.
- Alan Osborn Hughes, Director, Messrs. Ove Arup and Partners.
- Roy Inman. For services to Women's Judo.
- Professor William George Irwin. For services to General Practice Medicine in Northern Ireland.
- Josephine Lillian Wilson Johnson. For political and public service.
- Emlyn Rawson Jones, Principal, Yale Sixth Form College, Wrexham, Clwyd.
- Gareth Jones, Headmaster, Ysgol John Bright, Llandudno, Gwynedd.
- Vivian Edwin Jones, County Engineer and Planning Officer, Hereford and Worcester County Council.
- Arthur Kennedy. For services to the Laundry Industry.
- Frederick John Kennedy, Regional Reporter, Children's Panel, Strathclyde Region.
- Desmond John Keohane, lately Principal, Oxford College of Further Education.
- Patrick Killen, Managing Director, Tyrone Crystal Ltd.
- Eric Kime. For political and public service.
- John Robert James King, lately Tunnels Director, Trans Link Joint Venture.
- Robert King, Convener, Kirkcaldy District Council.
- Shirley Georgina King. For political and public service.
- John Michael Knowles, Director, Marwell Preservation Trust and Marwell Zoological Park.
- Walter Henry Lambert. For services to Industry and Training in Kent.
- Ian James Lawrenson, Grade 6, Department of Trade and Industry.
- David Levene, First Class Valuer, Board of Inland Revenue.
- Peter Lawrence Levy, Chairman, Cystic Fibrosis Research Trust.
- Colin Lewis, Grade 6, Ministry of Defence.
- David Overington Lewis, Manager, Patents and Trade Marks, Babcock International Group plc.
- Derek Fahey Lewis, HM Inspector of Schools, Department of Education and Science.
- Hedley Lock, MBE, BEM, Grade 6, Ministry of Defence.
- Adrian Reginald Longley, lately Legal Adviser to the National Council for Voluntary Organisation.
- Anthony John Lord, Director, National Trust, Northern Ireland Region.
- Brian Crichton Loretto, Principal, Department of Education, Northern Ireland.
- Joseph Ebenezer Lovell, Chairman, Association of Sea Fisheries Committee.
- Marshall Leonard Marinker, Director, The MSD Foundation; Former Professor of General Practice, University of Leicester.
- Edward Henderson Marley, General Manager, Design Engineering, Swan Hunter Shipbuilding and Engineering Group Ltd, Wallsend, Newcastle upon Tyne.
- John James Brendan McGahan, Chief Executive, Livestock Marketing Commission.
- David Rollo McNicoll, Chief Executive, Scottish Consultative Council on the Curriculum.
- Bruce Alastair Merchant, lately Vice-Chairman, Highland Health Board.
- William Eric Wolf Montgomery, MBE, Chairman, Ulster-American Folk Park.
- Eric Moonman. For services to Bloomsbury and Islington Health Authority.
- Juliet Ann Moore, District Nursing Adviser and Assistant Director for Contracts and Quality.
- John Scotland Moreland, Member, Cumbernauld Development Corporation.
- Morgan John Morgan. For services to Game Fishing.
- Hamish Robertson Morrison, Chief Executive, Scottish Council Development and Industry.
- Margaret Jane Morrison, BEM, Co-Chairman, Women's National Commission.
- Adam James Morrow. For political and public service.
- Henry Vincent Mulligan. For services to the Housing Association movement in Scotland.
- Eileen Murdoch, Headteacher, St. Augustine's School, Edinburgh.
- William John Newburn, Director, Nih Housing Association Ltd.
- Lotte Theresa Newman (Mrs. Aronsohn). General Medical Practitioner; Past President, Medical Women's Federation; Vice-Chairman, Council, Royal College of General Practitioners.
- Trevor Newton, Deputy Chairman, and Group Managing Director, Yorkshire Water plc.
- Betty Nicholl. For services to the St. John Ambulance Brigade.
- Edmund O'Leary, Senior Partner, Veryard and Partners, Consulting Engineers.
- Margaret Annie Orchard. For political and public service.
- Buddug Owen, lately Consultant Anaesthetist, Ysbyty Glan Clwyd Hospital.
- Marcel Auger Pachebat, lately Broadcasting Consultant, The Services Sound and Vision Corporation.
- Gilbert Henry Parry. For services to the Community in Chester.
- (Hilda Elsie) Marguerite Patten. For services to the Art of Cookery.
- Geoffrey David Paul, lately Editor, Jewish Chronicle.
- Major Kenneth William Pettegree, TD. For political service.
- Peter Phelan, QPM, Deputy Assistant Commissioner, Metropolitan Police.
- Captain Edmund Malcolm Stuart Phelps, Captain, Royal Research Ship John Biscoe, British Antarctic Survey, Natural Environment Research Council.
- Elizabeth Ann Piggott, Secretary, Macaulay Land Use Research Institute.
- Michael Henry Porter, RD, Grade 7, HM Board of Customs and Excise.
- Barry Walter Price. For political service.
- Florence Price, Member, Nottinghamshire County Council. For services to rural affairs.
- Douglas Purves Pringle, Grade 6, Forestry Commission, Scotland.
- Derek William Punshon, lately Grade 6, Home Office.
- Professor John McArthur Reid, Senior Zone Scientific Adviser to Central Government.
- Malcolm John Reilly, Coach, Great Britain Rugby League Team.
- Mary Angela Reynolds, Assistant General Manager, Chief Medical Officer and Executive Underwriting Consultant, Canada Life Assurance Company.
- Charles Francis Robinson. For political and public service.
- David Wyndham Colenso Rodda, Grade 6, Department of the Environment.
- Frederick Rodgers, Consultant, Non-executive Director, Balfour Beatty Power Ltd. For services to Export.
- Christopher Rogers, Livestock Husbandry Advisory Officer I, Ministry of Agriculture, Fisheries and Food.
- Ruth, The Viscountess Runciman, Member, Advisory Council on the Misuse of Drugs.
- Richard Savinson, Managing Director, Electricity Association Services Ltd.
- Jean Rose Masson Searle. For political and public service.
- Roy Sewell, Senior Valuer, Board of Inland Revenue.
- Donald Ian Shearer, President, The Cold Storage and Distribution Federation.
- John Vincent Shennan, Site Director, Risley, United Kingdom Atomic Energy Authority.
- Barry Malcolm Simmons, Headteacher, Kingsland School, Hackney, London.
- Joseph Victor Simpson. For political service.
- Ralph Conway Skelton, Senior Technical Education Adviser, Overseas Development Administration.
- June Rosalind Spencer (Mrs. Brocksom), Actress.
- Geoffrey Charles Steeley, County Planning and Estates Officer, Hertfordshire County Council.
- Alan Russell Stephenson, lately Secretary, University of London School Examinations Board.
- Arthur Edward Stone, Chief Executive and Director, Leeds and Holbeck Building Society.
- David Stone. For political service.
- Henry Isidore Tankel, lately Consultant Surgeon, Southern General Hospital, Glasgow.
- Margaret Sylvia Taylor, Grade 6, Department of Trade and Industry.
- Desmond James Thompson. For services to the Veterinary Profession.
- John Quarrell Thorburn, Managing Director, Thorburn plc.
- Ronald James Toseland, Deputy Controller, National Air Traffic Services.
- Sidney Basil Trease. For public service and service to the Community in Nottingham.
- Janet Trotter, Principal, Cheltenham and Gloucester College of Higher Education.
- Terence Arthur True, Company Personnel Manager, Remploy Ltd.
- Leonard Keith Turner, Headmaster, Watford Boys' Grammar School.
- Peter John Twin, Professor of Physics, University of Liverpool.
- Roger Miles Uttley. For services to Rugby Union Football.
- Frederick William Thomas Venables, Leader, Ellesmere Port and Neston Borough Council.
- David James Walker, Manufacturing Director, All Wheel Drive Ltd.
- Norman Henry Walker, Director, National Oilwell (UK) Ltd; Chairman, Stockport Business Venture Ltd.
- Harry Watson, Managing Director, Mirrlees Blackstone (Stockport) Ltd; Managing Director, Mirrlees Blackstone (Stamford) Ltd.
- Charles Paton Webb, Clerk, North Tyneside Justices.
- David John Wells, Director, Public Prosecution, London Borough of Southwark.
- Roy James Westmore. For service to the Community in Newport, Isle of Wight.
- Roger John Wheater, Director, The Royal Zoological Society of Scotland and Edinburgh Zoo.
- David Haddon Whitaker, Chairman, J. Whitaker and Sons Ltd.
- Arthur William White, lately Deputy Managing Director, Andrew Weir Shipping Ltd.
- Duncan Bryce White, Regional Sheriff Clerk, Scottish Office.
- Norman Arthur Whitehorn, Assistant Master, Court of Protection, Lord Chancellor's Department.
- Derek Alan Whiting, former Chairman, International Petroleum Exchange of London.
- Frederic William Whyte, Managing Director, Crabtree Vickers Division, Vickers plc. For services to Export.
- Elizabeth Diana Perrior Wilcox, Foreign and Commonwealth Office.
- Derek Wilebore, Divisional Director Energy Supply, Yorkshire Electricity Group.
- Arthur Williams, Chief Administrative Pharmaceutical Officer, Grampian Health Board.
- Colin Vaughan Williams, lately Director General of Supply and Contracts, British Coal.
- Michael Roy Williams, lately Technical Director, Aerospace Group, Rolls-Royce plc.
- Sheila Wiltshire, Headmistress, Haberdashers' Aske's School for Girls.
- Peter John James Wren, VRD, DL, MD, RNR. For services to the Community in Preston, Lancashire.
- Ada Wrighton, Chairman, Walsall Advisory Committee on Justices of the Peace.

==== Members (MBE) ====
- Christopher Michael Giles Adams, Operations Officer, Research Vessel Services, Natural Environment Research Council.
- Kriss Kezie Akabusi. For services to Athletics.
- Douglas Thomson Allsop, Executive Director, The Scottish Council on Alcohol.
- Ruth Anderson, Chairman, Blackpool and Fylde Spastics Group.
- Jean Andrews, College Nursing Sister, Wye College, University of London.
- Dennis Andries. For services to Boxing.
- Marion Violet Appel, Senior Executive Officer, Advisory Conciliation and Arbitration Service.
- John Graham Ardley. For political and public service.
- Maisie Arnold. For political service.
- Winnie Florence Ash, Local Officer I, Department of Social Security.
- Margaret Mary Ashton. For services to the Victim Support Scheme.
- Jack Ashwell, lately National Secretary, Road Transport (Commercial), Transport and General Workers Union.
- Raymond Seedall Aspin, Senior Training Officer, Rolls-Royce plc. For services to Training.
- Ethel Maud Austin. For services to the public and to the Community in Egham, Surrey.
- Frederick Donald Ayers. For services to the Scout Association in Carlisle, Cumbria.
- William Bain, Senior Executive Officer, HM Board of Customs and Excise.
- John Michael Barber, Director, Cumbria Deaf Association.
- Ann Beryl Barker, Macmillan Co-ordinator, Education and Services, Highland Health Board.
- Anne Flora Beattie, Headteacher, St. Kevin's Special School, Glasgow.
- William Beattie. For services to the Community in Buckie.
- Stanley Beddoe, Technology Manager (Power Generation and Control, Electronics and Software), GEC Aerospace, Fareham.
- Charles Edward Kenneth Beddow, Technical Manager, British Film Institute.
- Professor John George Beetlestone, Director, Techniquest, Cardiff.
- Robert Bell, Personnel, Industrial Relations and Health and Safety Manager, NEI International Research and Development Co.
- Gordon Sidney Bennett, lately Professional and Technology Officer, Ministry of Defence.
- Helen Johnston Bisset, lately Executive Officer, Scottish Office.
- Kay Blackstock, Lecturer in Education, HM Prison, Barlinnie.
- Noel James Bogle, Vice-Principal, Limavady Grammar School, Co. Londonderry.
- Joyce Bowe. For political and public service.
- Maureen Anne Boyce, Branch Society, Suffolk Branch, British Red Cross Society.
- Sheila Boynton, Services Manager, Prescription Pricing Authority.
- Lieutenant Frederick George Brading, RN, (Retd), Chairman, Gosport and Fareham Inshore Rescue Service.
- Roland Thomas Browne, General Manager, Product Development, Renault Truck Industries Ltd.
- Joyce Stephanie Bryant. For services to the Community in Bagshot, Surrey.
- John Lalande Bulley, Managing Director, J. L. B. Textiles Ltd.
- Mary Catherine Bullock, Acting Director of Nursing Services, Mid Surrey Health Authority.
- James William Bunting, Chairman, Beacon Controls Ltd.
- Thomas Burnet, General Practitioner, Thornhill and Doune, Perthshire.
- Donnie Burns. For services to Latin Dance.
- Brian Jackson Burton. For services to the Royal Air Forces Association, Kingston upon Thames Branch.
- Thomas Albert Cadman, Governor, HM Prison Birmingham.
- The Honourable Judith Cameron. For political service.
- Catherine Campbell, Headteacher, Arkleston Primary School, Renfrew.
- Miriam Doreen Cannell. For services to the Norfolk and Norwich Music Club.
- Louis Capaldi, Member, Argyll and Clyde Health Board.
- Anthony Chantler, Product Support Executive, British Aerospace (Dynamics) Ltd.
- Michael Frank Cherry, Principal Systems Engineer, Hunting Communication Technology Ltd.
- Michael Richard Chorley, Senior Scientific Officer, Ministry of Defence.
- Winifred Margaret Osborn-Clark, Vice-President, Avon Region, National Deaf Children's Society.
- Peter Clarke, Resident Engineer, Milton Keynes Development Corporation.
- Betty Clarkson, Headteacher, Dalton Infant and Nursery School, Huddersfield.
- Valerie Clemons. For charitable services in Rugby, Warwickshire.
- Mary Sutherland Coard, Area Welfare Services Organiser, North East Area 2, Women's Royal Voluntary Service.
- William Arthur Collier. For services to the Young Men’s Christian Association, Brighton, Sussex.
- James Collins, District Manager, South Mersey Water Supply, North West Water Ltd.
- Ann Coney, Energy Management Officer, London Borough of Lewisham.
- Kenneth Connor, Actor.
- Patrick Croan, Chairman, Herring Buyers Association Ltd.
- Hal Trevor Malcolmson Crowe, Editor and General Manager, Farmweek.
- John Albert Daniels, lately Manager, Clipstone Colliery, British Coal.
- Margaret Chisholm Darling. For political service.
- Mary Joyce Darlington. For political and public service.
- John Victor Davies. For services to the Royal British Legion, Lampeter Branch.
- Margaret Joan Davies, Local Officer I, Department of Social Security.
- Peter Dawson, Clerk to Bolton Justices.
- Ivy Day. For political and public service.
- Michael Brian Day, Head, War Pensions Department, Royal British Legion.
- Peter John Deviell, Lately Senior Executive Officer, Department of Employment.
- Sister Mary Joseph Deeny, Principal St Oliver Plunkett Girls' Primary School, Belfast.
- Elizabeth Dendy. For services to Sport, particularly for Disabled People.
- Steven Dey, General Secretary, Plymouth Guild of Community Service.
- Jean Margaret Dinneen, Registration Officer, General Dental Council.
- Malcolm Doley, Founder, Lancashire Students' Symphony Orchestra.
- Patricia Douglas, Director, Charles Rennie Mackintosh Society.
- Constance Irene Downes, lately Education Officer, Coventry Cathedral.
- Roderick James Drew, Chairman, Coventry City Centre Alcohol Related Crime Project.
- The Venerable John Finch Duncan, Chairman, Copec Housing Trust.
- Pauletta Joan Edwards. For services to The Save The Children Fund.
- Brian Ellerby, Works Manager, Weetabix Ltd.
- Frederick Ellerby, BEM, lately Chairman, Gloucestershire War Pensions Committee.
- Dorothy Isobel Elliott. For services to The Save The Children Fund.
- Peter William Emsley, Higher Executive Officer, Lord Chancellor's Department.
- Stephen Entwistle, Military Systems Office, Vickers Shipbuilding and Engineering Ltd, Barrow-in-Furness.
- William Frederick Evans. For services to the Beaumaris Brass Band.
- Gaynor Fairweather. For services to Latin Dance.
- Margaret Sinclair Ferguson, Deputy Director, Aberlour Child Care Trust.
- Eric Finney, Chairman, Gwent Probation Committee.
- Raymond Foley, Lately Senior Professional and Technology Officer, Property Services Agency.
- Oliver Haldane Frazer, Vice-President, Isle of Wight Natural History and Archaeological Society.
- Vera Pamela Freeman, Divisional Superintendent, Suffolk County, St John Ambulance Brigade.
- Walter French. For political service.
- Douglas Robert Garland, Deputy General Manager, Cathedral Works Organisation (Chichester) Ltd.
- Harry Garland, Chairman, Advisory Committee on Scotland's Travelling People.
- David Walker Garside. For services to the development of Wankel-type rotary engine technology.
- Alison Geissler, Glass Engraver.
- Archibald Gentles. For services to the Community in Burton-on-Trent, Staffordshire.
- Jacqueline Gifford, Ward Sister, South Bedfordshire Health Authority.
- Charles Brian Gilbert. For services to the Community in Maghera, Co. Londonderry.
- Thomas Glasgow. For services to the Disabled in the West Midlands.
- Jean Glover, Organiser, Education Grants Advisory Service.
- Norman Henry Green, Headteacher, Holy Trinity Church of England (VA) School, Cookridge, Leeds.
- Gwyneth Maud Griffiths. For political and public service.
- Gillian Margaret Gunner. For political service.
- Anthony John Gyselynck, Chief Pilot, Wycombe Air Centre Ltd.
- Alfred James (Jim) George Hall, Member, Advisory Council of Farming and Wildlife Trust.
- Margaret Minnie Hall, Staff Officer, Department of Education, Northern Ireland.
- Mohammed Rafiek Hallim, Inspector of Taxes (S), Board of Inland Revenue.
- James Ham, lately Member, Kerrier District Council.
- Bryan Frederick Charles Hammond, Resident Contract Manager, Dudley Coles Ltd.
- Ronald Victor Hammond, Seawolf Technical Manager, Naval Division, Marconi Radar Systems Ltd.
- Douglas Francis Harding, Superintendent, Kent County Constabulary.
- Joan Marion Harding, Chairman, Domestic Buildings Research Group (Surrey).
- Rosamond Drusilla Harley, Lecturer in Conservation of Fine Art, Newcastle upon Tyne Polytechnic.
- Major James Fulton Harrison, TD, lately Chairman, Wiltshire War Pensions Committee.
- Gwyneth Mary Hebblethwaite. For political and public service.
- Thomas Henney, Principal, Thomas Henney, Architects.
- Baden Herbert William Hickman, lately Senior Information Officer, Central Office of Information.
- Brian Richards Hill, Managing Director, Crosrol Ltd.
- Patricia Brigid Hill, Assistant Teacher, St. Catherine's Convent Primary School, Belfast.
- Helen Felicity Hindson. For political service.
- Anthony John Hines, Chief Executive, Aviation Training Association.
- David Alan Hoare, lately Senior Executive Officer, Ministry of Agriculture, Fisheries and Food.
- Ian Geoffrey Hogbin, Legal Assistant, West Yorkshire Passenger Transport Executive (PTE).
- Barry George Hook, Chief Administrative Officer, County of Avon Fire Brigade.
- Norman Anthony Horsley, Manager, Risk Improvement and Survey Department, Sun Alliance Insurance Group.
- James Evans Horton. For services to the 1940 Dunkirk Veterans' Association.
- Catherine Hosty, Health Visitor, St Helens and Knowsley Health Authority.
- Jane Elizabeth Houston, Archivist, Lambeth Palace.
- John Michael Howes, Chairman, South London Family and Committee Member of Crystal Palace Housing Associations.
- Doreen Howlett, Vice-Chairman, Bath District Health Authority.
- Juan Huang, Commercial Officer, Anglo-Taiwan Trade Committee. For services to Export.
- Peter Maurice Hull. For services to Sport for the Disabled.
- Ursula Hulme, Founder, CONQUEST, Epsom, Surrey.
- Jean Kathleen Vernon-Jackson. For Services to the Community in Lymington, Hampshire.
- Richard Quintin Hanson Jaggar, VRD, Chairman, Management Committee Swindon Unit, Sea Cadet Corps.
- Glynne John, Vice-President, Bridgend Division, Soldiers', Sailors' and Airmen's Families Association.
- Jack Johnson, Chairman, Pontefract and District Civic Trust.
- Frank Tudor Whitney Jordan, Honorary Senior Fellow, University of Liverpool.
- Olive Kaer. For political and public service.
- Brigade Lieutenant Colonel Charles Sydney Kay, Brigade Staff Secretary and Chief Staff Officer, Jewish Lads' and Girls' Brigade.
- Donovan Frank Kelley, Fish Biologist.
- Cyril Leslie Kersh. For services to the Association of Jewish Ex-Servicemen and Women and for services to the Community.
- Martin William King, Higher Executive Officer, Office of Population Censuses and Surveys.
- Joseph Henry Knox, TD, Board Member, Northern Ireland Tourist Board.
- John Alfred Charles Laidlaw. For political service.
- Thomas Lang, Principal Teacher of English, St. Gerard's Secondary School, Govan, Glasgow.
- Jack Chapman Lavin, Principal Ecological Officer, Bradford Metropolitan City Council.
- John Robert Lepine, General Manager, The Motor Schools Association of Great Britain.
- Sylvia Lindsay, Director, The Council for Music in Hospitals.
- William Garnett Liversidge, Senior Professional and Technology Officer, Vehicle Inspectorate Executive Agency, Department of Transport.
- Julia Lunn, Superintendent, Dorset Police.
- Commander Geoffrey Clement Percival Lycett. For services to the Community in Stourbridge, West Midlands.
- John Alexander Macrae. For services to Gaelic music.
- Edwin Joseph Malone, Senior Executive Officer, HM Board of Customs and Excise.
- George Thomas Mandl, Chairman, Thomas and Green Holdings Ltd.
- Ronald Alexander Marshall, Higher Executive Officer, Department of Social Security.
- Edward Martin, Blacksmith, Farrier and Agricultural Engineer.
- John Graham Martin, Chief Engineer, Peninsular and Oriental Steam Navigation Company.
- Cecil Matthews, National Pensions Officer, Royal Naval Association.
- Roderick Alfred Matthews, Director, Telecommunications Services; lately Director Information Technology Services, ICL.
- Neil McArthur, Chairman, Thurnall Engineering plc.
- Archibald Denis McAuley, Independent Councillor, Moyle District Council, County Antrim.
- Frederick Clive McComb, Chief Superintendent, Royal Ulster Constabulary.
- Lloyd McCullough, Personal Director, Crossbows Optical Ltd.
- Jane McGranaghan, Valuation Technician, Board of Inland Revenue.
- John French McGregor, Chairman, Disablement Income Group, Scotland.
- James McGuire, Independent Food Retailer.
- John McKee, Librarian, Wallace Collection.
- Anthony John Membrey, General Practitioner, Tunbridge Wells, Kent.
- Christine Merricks, Youth and Community Worker, Saints Youth Club, Wolverhampton.
- Donald Albert Mildenhall, Editorial Consultant, Western Gazette.
- William Ferguson Miller. For services to Association Football in Scotland.
- Martha Mary Moody, Chairman, Feughdee West Community Council.
- Frances Stephanie Moor, Health Visitor and Fieldwork Teacher, Liverpool Health Authority.
- Henry Charles Moore, TD. For political service.
- The Reverend Robert Moore, Assistant Divisional Director, Yorkshire and Humberside Division, Barnardos.
- Janet Morris. For services to the Community in Denbigh, Clwyd.
- Mona Rachel Morris. For public service in Wales.
- Stephen David Moss, Vice-Chairman, Restaurateurs Association of Great Britain.
- Norman Winnaka Natall Mullings, Chairman of Governors, New Furness Primary School, North West London.
- Patrick Anthony Neenan, Commercial Director, AMG Industries plc.
- James Alexander Gordon Nicoll. For services to Journalism.
- Betty Florence Nuttall, Headteacher, Stow Heath Junior School, Willenhall, Wolverhampton.
- Thomas Joseph O'Connor, Chairman and Managing Director, Elta Plastics Ltd.
- Mary Elizabeth O'Sullivan, Headteacher, English Martyrs' Roman Catholic Primary School, South East London.
- Alan Benjamin Otlet, General Medical Practitioner, Bristol.
- Hilary Elizabeth Page, Higher Executive Officer, Employment Service, Department of Employment.
- William Arthur Painter, Technical Manager, Development, Thorn EMI Electronics, Crawley.
- Muriel Gladwys Palmer, Inspector of Taxes, Board of Inland Revenue.
- Edith Ruby Parker, Principal, Princess Alexandra and Newham College of Nursing and Midwifery.
- Michael Edward Peach, lately Manager, London Transport Lost Property Office.
- Derrick George Pearce, lately Senior Professional and Technology Officer, Ministry of Defence.
- William David Peirse, Headmaster, St Aidan's Church of England High School, Preesall, Blackpool, Lancashire.
- Gilmour Pemberton, Local Officer I, Department of Social Security.
- Peter Pieroni, Manager, International Distribution, BP Chemicals Ltd.
- Beatrice Anne Pitcher. For charitable services.
- Sheilah Maureen Pitman. For political service.
- Bernard Walter Potter, Prison Visitor, HM Prison, Canterbury.
- Jean Elizabeth Nunn-Price, Grade 7, Science and Engineering Research Council.
- Edna Mary Procter, Senior Midwifery Manager, Maternity, Grimsby.
- David Cavanagh Rainford, Member, Area VII, Whitefish Industry Advisory Committee.
- Mavis Maureen Raper, lately Health Visitor, Tweedmouth Clinic, Berwick-upon-Tweed, Northumberland.
- William Leslie Raymond. For services to farming and community affairs.
- John James Reid, Accounts Office Manager, British Nuclear Fuels.
- Rosemary Ann Lloyd Roberts, Assistant Secretary (Wales), British Medical Association.
- Wilfred Roberts, Head, Whitewares Division, British Ceramic Research Ltd.
- Freda Lenice Robertson, Senior Sister, Twin Operating Theatres, Derbyshire Royal Infirmary.
- Frederick Singer Robertson, Executive Officer, Department of the Environment.
- Major John Christopher Robinson. For political service.
- Christina Robson. For political service.
- Morag McGilp Rosie, Director, Friends for the Young Deaf.
- Glyn Rosser. For services to the Deaf.
- Agnes Muriel Roxburgh, Warden, Leith House Hostel for Men, Edinburgh.
- John Richard Russell, lately Higher Executive Officer, Office of Population Censuses and Surveys.
- Harry Roy Ryals. For services to the Royal Pigeon Racing Association.
- James Riccardo Salandin, lately Secretary, Friends of St Paul's Cathedral.
- Catherine Sanderson, Accident and Emergency Sister, St John's Hospital, Livingston.
- Robert Anthony Sareen, Executive Manager, Oxford Instruments Group plc.
- Beryl Saunders, Member, London Borough of Croydon.
- Jane Saxby. For services to the National Federation of Community Service.
- John Scruton. For services to conservation in High Wycombe.
- Charles Sellers, Senior Master, De La Salle Sixth Form College, Salford.
- Mary Elizabeth Seymour, Revenue Executive, Board of Inland Revenue.
- Eva Shackleton. For services to the Thanet Division, Soldiers', Sailors' and Airmen's Families Association.
- Henry Alan Shadrack. For services to the Community in Chelmsford, Essex.
- Kanta Kumari Sharma, Executive Officer, Department of Social Security.
- Mary Ross Shephard, lately Chairman, Agricultural Wages Committee and Agricultural Dwelling House Advisory Committee for Gloucestershire, Avon and Wiltshire.
- Dorothy Elizabeth Sheridan, Archivist, Mass Observation Archive, University of Sussex.
- Martin Arthur Sibson, County Emergency Planning Officer, Essex County Council.
- Irene Maude Singleton, Higher Executive Officer, Department for National Savings.
- Jean Mary Slater, Higher Executive Officer, Employment Service, Department of Employment.
- Jean Slesser, Director of Tourism, Inverness, Loch Ness and Nairn Tourist Board.
- Valerie Ann Sloan, Inspector Grade III, Department of Agriculture, Northern Ireland.
- David Walter Smith, Higher Professional and Technology Officer, Ministry of Defence.
- Heather Ruth Banks-Smith, Associate Specialist, North Hertfordshire Health Authority.
- Michael Henry Smith, lately District Estates Officer, Gateshead Health Authority.
- Pamela Jeanne Griffin-Smith. For political service.
- Brian Sydney Snook, Regional Organiser, Institute of Advanced Motorists. For services to Road Safety.
- Wing Commander Kenneth Edwin Soal, Assistant Secretary, Wing Committee and Civilian Committee Secretary, No.149 (Poole) Squadron, Air Training Corps.
- Charles Solomons, Sales Executive, Brown and Perring London.
- John Drew Sproson, Senior Dental Officer, Kettering and Northampton Health Authority.
- Ann Ferguson Stewart, Inspector of Taxes (S), Board of Inland Revenue.
- Alison Jane Streeter. For services to Swimming.
- Andrew Sutherland, Adviser for Scotland, Concrete Advisory Service.
- John Sutton, Leader, Broxtowe Borough Council, Nottinghamshire.
- Andrew John Swanson, Assistant Company Secretary, National Power.
- Ernest Louis Symes. For services to the Community in Ilkeston, Derbyshire.
- The Reverend Prebendary Clive Cavanagh Taylor, Force Chaplain, Metropolitan Police.
- Joseph Taylor. For services to the Community in Leeds.
- Noreen Barbara Taylor, Director of Services, Isle of Wight Society for the Blind.
- Aurelie Georgina Tees, Domestic Bursar, Keele University.
- Robert David Thomas, Divisional Officer III, Gwynedd Fire Service.
- The Reverend Thomas Arwyn Thomas, Vice-Chairman, Pembrokeshire Health Authority.
- Ronald Edward Thompson, Senior Reporter and Interviewer, Grampian Television.
- Christopher William Thurman, Economist and Statistician, Brewers' Society.
- Ivor Sigmund Tiefenbrun, Chairman and Managing Director, Linn Products Ltd, Eaglesham, Glasgow.
- Basil Ashton Tinkler, Manager, Flood Defences, National Rivers Authority, Wessex Region.
- Jane Elizabeth Tozer, Chief Executive, Softwright Systems.
- Malcolm Colin Treacher. For services to the Scout Association, Essex County.
- Esther Jean Trenouth. For services to the Community in St. Merryn and Padstow, Cornwall.
- Mary Frances Turner. For services to the Recreational Use of Inland Waterways.
- Frank Edward Underdown, Senior Scientific Officer, Meteorological Office.
- Laurence Alan Vaisey, Higher Executive Officer, Ministry of Defence.
- Sheila Vaughan, Senior Personal Secretary, Royal Greenwich Observatory, Science and Engineering Research Council.
- Betty Diana Vause. For services to the Community in Bolton.
- Alistair William Andrew Wallace, General Secretary, Scottish Police Federation; Inspector, Strathclyde Police.
- Sheila Margaret Walton, Senior Personal Secretary, Department of Education and Science.
- John Waring, Farmer, North Humberside.
- Laura Margaret Waring, Executive Officer, Export Credits Guarantee Department.
- Eleanor Catherine Warren, Chamber Music Co-ordinator, The Guildhall School of Music and Drama.
- Vivian Norton Waters, Principal, Ebbw Vale College of Further Education.
- Alec Waterson. For political service.
- Karl Eric Watkin, Managing Director, Crabtree of Gateshead Ltd.
- Eileen Joyce Watkinson, Founder, The Three Owls Bird Sanctuary, Rochdale, Lancashire.
- Edith Dorothy Webb, lately Director, Community Nursing Service, Bath Health Authority.
- John Whitaker. For services to Show Jumping.
- Iris Morina Wills, Senior Midwife, Community Midwifery with Hospital Liaison, Wales.
- Michael Wilson, Chief Superintendent, Gwent Constabulary.
- Kathleen Wixcey, Nursing Sister, Accident and Emergency Unit, Royal Gwent Hospital, Newport, Gwent.
- James Brian Wood, Chairman, Coal Trade Benevolent Association.
- Peggy Sophia Wood. For services to Charity.
- Alfred Maldwyn Woodcock, Consultant, Valleys Adviser.
- Edward Arnold Wright, Council Member, Fauna and Flora Preservation Society.
- Geoffrey Wright, Green Strategy Co-ordinator, Leeds City Council.
- Norbert Zuman, Principal Engineer (Lighting), Hertfordshire County Council.

=== Imperial Service Order (ISO) ===
- Daniel Kevin Austin, Grade 7, Department of the Environment, Northern Ireland.
- Robert Hartland Bayley, Official Receiver (A), The Insolvency Service, Department of Trade and Industry.
- Charles Henry Burling, Foreign and Commonwealth Office.
- Brian Barry Cattermole, Grade 7, HM Board of Customs and Excise.
- Eveline Elizabeth Craske, lately Grade 6, Training Enterprise and Education Directorate, Department of Employment.
- Peter Ronald Daniell, Principal Information Officer, Central Office of Information.
- Anthony John Freeman, Grade 7, Property Services Agency.
- Dennis Edwin Herbert Heath, Grade 7, Employment Service, Department of Employment.
- Peter Charles Johnson, Grade 6, Ministry of Defence.
- Arthur Alfred King, Principal Scientific Officer, Central Veterinary Laboratory, Ministry of Agriculture, Fisheries and Food.
- Noel McLaughlin, Grade 6, Ministry of Defence.
- Royston John Payne, Inspector of Taxes (S P), Board of Inland Revenue.
- Graham Thomas Peters, Grade 7, Ministry of Defence.
- Robert Pounder, Grade 6, Property Services Agency.
- Robert Malcolm Ruegg, Grade 7, Ministry of Defence.
- John Simpson, lately Grade 7, Home Office.
- Ian Compton Stewart, lately Secretary, Parole Board of Scotland, Scottish Office.
- John Cuthbert Tibbels, lately Grade 7, Ministry of Agriculture, Fisheries and Food.
- Roger Charles Troke, Grade 7, Department of Trade and Industry.
- David John Wilson Vaudin, Grade 7, Driver and Vehicle Licensing Executive Agency, Department of Transport.
- Peter William Warrington, Inspector of Taxes (SP), Board of Inland Revenue.
- Peter Webber, Senior Principal, Board of Inland Revenue.
- James Campbell Wilson, lately Grade 7, Department of Social Security.
- Leslie Albert Wood, Grade 7, Department of Health.
- Ernest Albert Yeo, Grade 7, HM Treasury.

=== British Empire Medal (Military Division) ===
Royal Navy

- Chief Petty Officer Marine Engineering Artificer (P) Geoffrey Antcliff, D181014E.
- Chief Petty Officer Airman (AH) Stephen Fredrick Coburn, D098512A.
- Air Engineering Mechanician (Electrical) First Class (Careers Service) Martin James Ellis, F967063V.
- Petty Officer Airman (AH) Robert Howard Hughes, D144575T.
- Temporary Acting Chief Petty Officer (Deck) Robert Francis Kirk, Royal Fleet Auxiliary Service, R761577.
- Marine Edward James McLaughlin, Royal Marines, P038643M.
- Chief Marine Engineering Mechanic (M) William Price, K851559X.
- Chief Petty Officer Air Engineering Artificer (WL) Michael Terrence Saunders, F967887T.
- Band Sergeant Stephen John Saunders, Royal Marines, Q003780P.
- Chief Petty Officer Marine Engineering Artificer (M) Philip Henry Nicholas Till, D136545K.
- Chief Petty Officer Airman (PHOT) Paul Wellings, D102288H.
- Chief Petty Officer (Mine Warfare) John Brian Norman White, Royal Naval Reserve, D987461H.
- Colour Sergeant Ian James Wilkie, Royal Marines, P025740C.
- Medical Technician 1st Class Luigi Wilks, D171013S.
- Chief Petty Officer Stores Accountant Richard Dudley Williams, D118413E.
- Chief Petty Officer Air Engineering Artificer (M) Roger Leslie Wiltshire, D096333A.
- Charge Chief Marine Engineering Artificer (P) John Syme Young, D185704U.

Army

- 24167589 Sergeant Raymond Francis Bishop, Royal Regiment of Artillery.
- 24591669 Corporal Robert Grant Blythe, Royal Corps of Signals.
- 24256764 Sergeant (now Staff Sergeant) Donald James McKinlay Brown, The Royal Scots Dragoon Guards (Carabiniers and Greys).
- 24127697 Corporal John David Bryant, Royal Corps of Signals.
- 24323554 Staff Sergeant Jon Foster Buchan, 17th/21st Lancers.
- 24326469 Sergeant Peter David Burgoyne, Corps of Royal Military Police.
- 24395555 Sergeant John Mitchell Burnett, Corps of Royal Electrical and Mechanical Engineers.
- 23976469 Sergeant Henry Gibson Moss Clark, Army Catering Corps, Territorial Army.
- 24195608 Staff Sergeant John Dennis Coles, Royal Corps of Signals.
- 24672942 Sergeant Paul Collard, Royal Army Pay Corps.
- 24235865 Staff Sergeant Hugh Collett, Royal Army Ordnance Corps.
- 24408458 Sergeant William Charles Corbett, The Staffordshire Regiment (The Prince of Wales's).
- 23241852 Corporal John Arthur Curtis, The Queen's Regiment, Territorial Army.
- 24185539 Guardsman Richard Curtis, Coldstream Guards.
- 21160539 Sergeant Dhanbahadurthapa, Queen's Gurkha Signals.
- W/0467743 Sergeant Susan Anne Dicks, Women's Royal Army Corps.
- 24096857 Sergeant James Donald, Scots Guards.
- 24340872 Staff Sergeant Philip Roy Fahrenholz, Corps of Royal Military Police.
- W/0460022 Staff Sergeant Eva Diane Feest, Women's Royal Army Corps, Territorial Army.
- 23875851 Staff Sergeant Charles Andrew Giblin, Royal Army Ordnance Corps, Territorial Army.
- 23894963 Sergeant Sydney Thomas Gilmore, Royal Army Ordnance Corps, Territorial Army.
- 24190461 Staff Sergeant Maurice Ellis Glaholm, Corps of Royal Electrical and Mechanical Engineers, Territorial Army.
- 21160499 Staff Sergeant Gobindarai, 10th Princess Mary's Own Gurkha Rifles.
- 24145374 Staff Sergeant Robert Martin Graham, Royal Army Ordnance Corps.
- 24380518 Sergeant John Haldane, The Royal Highland Fusiliers, (Princess Margaret's Own Glasgow and Ayrshire Regiment).
- 24557373 Staff Sergeant James David Halliday, Corps of Royal Military Police.
- 24425847 Staff Sergeant Jonathan Paul Keith Heffernan, Royal Army Ordnance Corps.
- 24245292 Staff Sergeant Barry Austin John, The Royal Regiment of Wales (24th/41st Foot), Territorial Army.
- 24447816 Corporal Christopher Gilroy Jones, Royal Army Ordnance Corps.
- 21161428 Sergeant Kulbahadurlimbu, 10th Princess Mary's Own Gurkha Rifles.
- 23945276 Sergeant John Michael Langelier, The Light Infantry, Territorial Army.
- 24592485 Sergeant Scott William Leckie, Royal Army Ordnance Corps.
- W/0459948 Sergeant Lauren Elizabeth Lilley, Women's Royal Army Corps/Intelligence Corps.
- 24067347 Sergeant Christopher Douglas Livett, Royal Regiment of Artillery.
- 24204998 Staff Sergeant Anthony William Mackey, Royal Army Ordnance Corps.
- 24200389 Staff Sergeant John Massie Mair, The Royal Highland Fusiliers, (Princess Margaret's Own Glasgow and Ayrshire Regiment).
- 24294401 Staff Sergeant Alfred McConnell, The Queen's Royal Irish Hussars.
- 24224783 Staff Sergeant Gavin Stuart McGregor, Royal Regiment of Artillery.
- 24076821 Sergeant Robert Eaglesom McQuarrie, Scots Guards.
- 24335675 Sergeant Andrew Malcolm Millard, Royal Corps of Signals.
- 24479683 Sergeant Gary Andrew Mitchell, Royal Corps of Transport.
- 24442239 Staff Sergeant Victor Harry Moon, Corps of Royal Military Police.
- LS23738954 Staff Sergeant Peter Palmer, The Royal Green Jackets.
- 24394199 Sergeant Brian Harry Penfold, Corps of Royal Electrical and Mechanical Engineers.
- 24303042 Staff Sergeant Julian John Pennie, The Royal Regiment of Wales (24th/41st Foot).
- 24386858 Staff Sergeant Cyril Thomas Pickwell, The Queen's Lancashire Regiment.
- 24094470 Staff Sergeant Trevor Pilkington, Corps of Royal Engineers.
- 24222604 Corporal Alexander Whyte Rankin, Royal Corps of Signals.
- 24296073 Staff Sergeant Colin Nigel Richardson, The Cheshire Regiment.
- 23237352 Corporal John Robinson, Corps of Royal Engineers, Territorial Army.
- 24285076 Sergeant Edgar John Sheppard, Royal Regiment of Artillery.
- 24255674 Staff Sergeant Frederick Edward Small, Royal Corps of Signals.
- 24636829 Corporal (now Sergeant) Rex Finley Smith, Royal Army Ordnance Corps.
- 24128955 Lance Corporal (now Corporal) David William Peter Soane, The Parachute Regiment.
- 24256416 Staff Sergeant (now Warrant Officer Class 2) William Stobbart, 14th/20th King's Hussars.
- 24541388 Staff Sergeant George Thom, Corps of Royal Military Police.
- 24432442 Staff Sergeant Christopher Robert Trott, Corps of Royal Engineers.
- 24225519 Staff Sergeant Bryan Trotter, The King's Own Scottish Borderers.
- 23621737 Staff Sergeant George Albert Tucker, The Parachute Regiment, Territorial Army.
- 24098388 Staff Sergeant John Desmond Turgoose, Corps of Royal Engineers.
- 24386734 Staff Sergeant (now Warrant Officer Class 2) Mark Wallis, Royal Army Ordnance Corps.
- 23051216 Staff Sergeant Brian John White, Royal Corps of Transport, Territorial Army.
- 24283374 Corporal Gordon Mclntosh Witty, Royal Corps of Transport.
- 23522865 Corporal David Thomas Wood, Army Catering Corps, Territorial Army.
- W/0459639 Staff Sergeant Lucinda Jane Wyllie, Women's Royal Army Corps.

Royal Air Force

- E8086793 Chief Technician Michael Graham Alexander.
- L8083649 Chief Technician Timothy John Allsopp.
- W4271745 Sergeant (now Flight Sergeant) Stephen Appleyard.
- C8090183 Sergeant Mark William Aram.
- L8007167 Chief Technician Peter Francis Bane.
- C8020117 Chief Technician Terence Nigel Bastin.
- L8090907 Chief Technician Clive Geoffrey Coles.
- E4275933 Flight Sergeant Terence St John Graham Cooke.
- D8105513 Sergeant Michael Dempsey.
- T8001158 Sergeant Michael Edward Denton.
- D8087431 Flight Sergeant David Ian Edmondston.
- U0595369 Flight Sergeant Reginald Josiah Etheridge.
- J8104906 Sergeant Christopher John French.
- Q8008533 Flight Sergeant Peter Hull.
- K8007426 Flight Sergeant John David Lamb.
- S4279616 Flight Sergeant Peter Marriott-Lodge.
- J1927351 Flight Sergeant Brian O'Dea.
- H8093939 Flight Sergeant David Aubrey Rees.
- T4288349 Flight Sergeant Robert Henry Rose.
- L1927353 Chief Technician Peter Rowling.
- A8102252 Flight Sergeant Ian Simpson.
- B8222136 Corporal Randal Leslie Smith.
- B8095488 Flight Sergeant David William Macrae Whalley.

=== British Empire Medal (Civil Division) ===
- Josephine Anne McLeam Adams, Leading Naval Auxiliary, Elgin Unit, Royal Naval Auxiliary Service.
- Imtiaz Ahmed, British High Commission, Delhi, Foreign and Commonwealth Office.
- Eric Alcock. For services to the Community in Amble, Northumberland.
- Dennis Reginald Aldridge, Craftsman, Aeroplane and Armament Experimental Establishment, Boscombe Down, Ministry of Defence.
- Margaret Helen Armstrong. For services to the Community in Swinderby, Lincoln.
- Christopher John Arnold, Police Constable, Gwent Constabulary.
- Elsie Rosa Arnott, Conductor, Aspatria Ladies Choir, Cumbria.
- Barbara Ellene Ash, Personal Secretary, Health and Safety Executive, Department of Employment.
- Georgina Alice Ayling. For services to the Girl Guides Association in Buckinghamshire.
- Edward John Baker. For services to the Greenock St. Andrew's Ambulance Corps.
- Florence Valerie Bancroft, Administrative Officer, Vehicle Inspectorate Swansea, Department of Transport.
- John Brian Barlow, Principal Officer, Northern Ireland Prison Service.
- Herbert Norman Barns, Voluntary Warden, Axmouth-Lyme Regis Undercliffs National Nature Reserve.
- Brian David James Barrat, Electronics Engineer, Milford Haven Port Authority.
- John Sutton Basford, lately Head Gardener, Brodick Castle, Isle of Arran.
- Nancy Beal, Typist, Ministry of Defence.
- Peter Raymond Beale, Senior Ranger, Ministry of Agriculture, Fisheries and Food (Forestry Commission).
- Anthony Reginald Begbie, Police Constable, Surrey Constabulary.
- Pamela Doris Bellinger, Foreign and Commonwealth Office.
- Joyce Madeline Frances Berg, Personal Secretary, Department of Education and Science.
- Alfred Charles Bruce Bilby, Caretaker, Thundersley Junior School, and For services to Amateur Football.
- Edward George Frank Bishop, Caretaker, Territorial Army Centre, Londesborough Barracks, Ministry of Defence.
- Stanley James Blakley. For services to the Ambulance Section, British Red Cross Society.
- John Blanks, Process and General Supervisory Grade 'B', Ministry of Defence.
- Barbara Blanche Booth, Secretary, Lincolnshire Police.
- Samuel Boustead, Principal Officer, HM Prison, Channings Wood.
- Eva Cook Bowles. For services to the Community in Liskeard, Cornwall.
- William John Bowman, Estate Building Foreman, Saltram, Devon.
- Elizabeth Bradford, Technician, Nottingham Polytechnic.
- Ada Ellen Brench, Administrative Officer, Metropolitan Police.
- Douglas George Brimacombe. For services to the Community in West Somerset.
- Bruce George Brown, Mechanic, Walmer Lifeboat, Kent, Royal National Lifeboat Institution.
- Douglas Roy Brown. For services to the Harper House Children's Service, Hertfordshire.
- John Wallace Brown, lately Chauffeur to the Archbishop of Canterbury.
- Robert Brown, lately Fitter, Ulsterbus Ltd.
- Robert John Bruce, Police Constable, Kent County Constabulary, and for Charitable Services.
- John William Buchan, Senior Officer (Instructor), HM Prison, Peterhead.
- Ronald Bury, Production Manager, James Walker Metaflex Ltd.
- Patricia Alice Campbell, Bookstall Salesperson, House of Commons.
- Freda Muriel Chapman. For Voluntary Services to the Forces Help Society.
- Marjorie Childs, Typist, Ministry of Defence.
- Audrey Ann Chivers, Personal Secretary, Ministry of Defence.
- Albert Edward Coleman. For services to the Community in Tamworth, Staffordshire.
- Walter Charles Coles, Farm Worker, Roadnight Farms.
- Elizabeth Collier, Administrative Officer, North of England Territorial Auxiliary Volunteer and Reserve Association.
- Joan Shirley Coomber, Administrative Officer, Public Trust Office, Lord Chancellor's Department.
- Victor James Court. For services to the Princess Margaret Hospital Radio, Swindon.
- Frederick William Norman Cowgill. For services to the Community in Cheshire.
- Reginald Victor William Cox. For services to Golf.
- Neil Patrick Rose Craigie, Principal Lightkeeper, Fair Isle Lighthouse, Orkney.
- John Crozier, Driver, London Midland Region, British Railways.
- Ann Cryer. For Voluntary Services to the North Western Regional Transfusion Service.
- Leah Goldwater Cummings, Administrative Officer, Department of Transport.
- Elizabeth Cunningham, Nursing Auxiliary, Liverpool Health Authority.
- Robert Ian Curran, Station Officer Retained, Cornwall County Fire Brigade.
- Mary Ann Cutts. For services to the Community in Belchamp-St-Paul, Sudbury, Suffolk.
- Peter Alexander Dale, Technician 1, British Telecommunications plc.
- Horace William Daughtrey. For services to the Community in Slinfold, West Sussex.
- William Elwyn Davies, Laboratory Technician Course Tutor, Dyfed County Council and lately Senior Laboratory Technician, Ysgol Dewi Sant, Dyfed.
- Drusilla Katrina Palmer Dennis. For services to the Community in Godstone, Surrey.
- Reginald Frederick Denny, Police Constable, Metropolitan Police.
- John Jamieson Deuchar. For services to the Youth and Community of Denny, Stirlingshire.
- Nora Devine, Manageress, Pennyburn Credit Union Ltd.
- Anthony Devis, Chief Technician, Royal Pharmaceutical Society of Great Britain.
- Walter Dickson. For services to the Dalkeith Community Council.
- William George Dingle, Police Constable, Norfolk Constabulary.
- Eileen Peggy Doe, Food Service Assistant, Royal Holloway and Bedford New College, Egham, Surrey.
- Elsie Kathleen Sheila Draper, lately Administrative Officer, Department of Trade and Industry.
- Ivor William Dyer, Rigger, HM Naval Base, Devonport, Ministry of Defence.
- Doreen Lilian Edwards. For services to Meals-on-Wheels, Harrow Women's Royal Voluntary Service.
- John Stewart Egginton. For services to Horseracing.
- Jean Mary Eglin, Catering Clerk, Post Office Management College, Rugby, The Post Office.
- Isobel Joan Elder. For services to the Community in Berwick-on-Tweed, Northumberland.
- David Elias. For services to the Stoke Newington Jewish Police Liaison Committee.
- Bernard Charles Martin Elsden, Chargeh and Craftsman, Royal Aircraft Establishment, Bedford, Ministry of Defence.
- Charles Elworthy. Police Museum Curator, West Midlands Police.
- Peter John England, Mailroom Supervisor, London Transport.
- Veronica Muriel Essame. For services to The Royal Air Forces Association in Berkshire.
- Annie Wardlaw Barber Fairbairn, Administrative Assistant, St. Columba's High School, Dunfermline.
- Graham Wilfred Fearn, lately Attendant, Cromer Lighthouse, Norfolk.
- Mary Irene Fearn, Cleaner, Institute of Arable Crops Research, Agricultural and Food Research Council.
- James Fearnley, lately Macebearer and Mayoral Attendant, Halton Borough Council.
- Barbara Margaret Ferguson, Secretary to the Secretary and Legal Adviser, British Aerospace plc.
- Evelyn Fewings. For services to the Community in Tiverton, Devon.
- Colin David Fletcher, Head Gardener, Sheffield City Polytechnic.
- Florence Mabel Flint, Administrative Officer, Passport Office, Home Office.
- William Flynn. For services to Strandtown Primary School, Belfast.
- Jean Mary Forrest, Foster Parent, West Sussex Council.
- Timothy Forrest, Foster Parent, West Sussex Council.
- Christine Olive Foulger, Auxiliary Coastguard, HM Coastguard, Walton-on-the-Naze.
- Alan Sidney Francis, Sub-Divisional Officer, Metropolitan Special Constabulary.
- Norah Betty Freeman, Support Grade B and 2, Board of Customs and Excise.
- Kenneth Albert Froggatt, Civilian Fingerprint Officer, Devon and Cornwall Constabulary.
- Gilian Fulford, Manager, Stourcastle Training Centre, Dorset.
- Arthur Edward Gale. For services to the Community in Thursley, Surrey.
- John Gawne, Sergeant, Royal Ulster Constabulary.
- Theodores Georghiou, British High Commission, Nicosia, Foreign and Commonwealth Office.
- Phyllis Mary Gibbs, Civilian Communication Officer, Derbyshire Constabulary.
- Victor Henry Goddard, Construction Foreman, Wessex Region, National Rivers Authority.
- Norman Goldspink. For services to the Chartered Institute of Building.
- Ian Cameron Gordon. For services to the Leeds Wounded Warriors Welfare Committee.
- Robert Gordon, Head Gamekeeper, Bute Estates, Isle of Bute.
- Robert Thomson Steell Gow, Joiner, Scottish Homes.
- Sheila Ann Gower, Personal Secretary to Association Secretary, South East Territorial Auxiliary Volunteer and Reserve Association.
- Adam Gray, Auxiliary Coastguard-in-Charge, HM Coastguard, Cockburnspath, Berwickshire.
- David Gray, Ambulance Member, Suffolk County, St. John Ambulance Brigade.
- Donald Green, Supervisor, Demonstrations and Presentations, Land Rover Ltd.
- Pauline Green, Foster Mother, Lincolnshire County Council.
- Thomas Green, Senior Foreman, London Electricity plc.
- James Gregson, Gardener, Richmond Park, Department of the Environment.
- Robert James Griffith. For services to the Clwyd Division, St. John Ambulance Brigade.
- Charles Harry Benjamin Groves, Manager, Stephen Austin and Sons Ltd.
- Christine Elizabeth Haines, lately Secretary to the Chief Executive, Wychavon District Council.
- Maurice Hales, Assistant Treasurer, Moorfields Eye Hospital.
- Jean Maud Hall, Secretary and Personal Assistant, East Midlands British Gas plc.
- Florence Edith Gwendoline Hamley, lately Administrative Officer, Ministry of Agriculture, Fisheries and Food.
- Oliver Albert Harbour. For services to the Community in Bembridge, Isle of Wight.
- Anthony Charles Harding, Police Constable, Metropolitan Police.
- Dennis Harnett, Head Hall Porter, Swallow Gosforth Park Hotel.
- Robert Anthony Harper, Leading Postal Technician, Birmingham, The Post Office.
- Francis John Thomas Hart. For services to the Community in Dorchester, Dorset.
- Peter Hartley, Health Physics Attendant, British Nuclear Fuels plc.
- Gwyneth Myora Hayward, Stores Officer Grade 'C', Ordnance Survey, Department of the Environment.
- Norman Irving Heap. For services to the Community in Earby, Lancashire.
- Geraldine Hilda Hearson, Technical Officer, Metropolitan Police.
- Bernard Joseph Heath. For services to the Mountain Bothies Association.
- Elizabeth Sheila Heath. For services to the Mountain Bothies Association.
- Bruce Arnold Herbert, Coxswain, Rhyl Lifeboat, Clwyd, Royal National Lifeboat Institution.
- Alan Geoffrey Hill, Senior Section Leader and Production Engineer, British Aerospace (Military Aircraft) Ltd.
- Philippa Hill. For services to the St. Raphael Club for the Physically Handicapped, Cambridge.
- Georgina Elizabeth Hilson, Secretary to Clerk, Bexley Magistrates Court.
- Raymond Vaughan Kinsley, Foreman, British Aerospace (Commercial Aircraft) Ltd.
- Daphne Hitchcock, Executive Officer, National Radiological Protection Board.
- Irene Shirley Hitchcock, Typist, The Insolvency Service, Department of Trade and Industry.
- James Arthur Hitchman, Maintenance Officer, Worcester College of Higher Education.
- Alfred Hoare, lately Milk Roundsman, Woodgate Farms Dairy.
- Gordon Hobson, Caretaker, Herries School, Sheffield.
- Elizabeth Hamilton Hodkinson, Clerks Secretary, Carrickfergus Borough Council.
- John Leonard Hogan, Rigger and Driver Foreman, Television Outside Broadcasts, British Broadcasting Corporation.
- Ronald Ian Hope, Police Sergeant, North Yorkshire Police.
- Olive Amelia Hughes. For services to the Community in Heswall, Wirral.
- William George Hunwick, Prison Officer (Instructor), HM Prison, Oxford.
- James Harkness Hutchinson, Reserve Constable, Royal Ulster Constabulary.
- Philomena Angela Hyland. For services to Service Families of the 1st Battalion, Royal Irish Rangers.
- Albert George Illsley. For services to the Community in Tilehurst, Reading.
- June Margaret Irthum, Support Manager 1 (Office Keeper 1A), Home Office.
- Sybil Joan Izzard, Supervisor, Glassware Washing Services, Medical Research Council, Radiobiology Unit, Harwell.
- Raymond George Jago, Joiner, Director General of Supplies and Transport (Naval), Devonport, Ministry of Defence.
- Victor Selwyn Thomas James, Sub-Officer Retained, Powys Fire Service.
- Miss Lucy Norna Jamieson. For services to the Community in Reawick, Shetland.
- Eileen Jenkins, lately Secretary and Personal Assistant to Town Clerk and Chief Executive, Stafford Borough Council.
- Anthony Richard Jones, Regimental Sergeant Major Instructor, Essex Army Cadet Force.
- Lilian Helena Briwnant-Jones. For services to Music, Culture and the Community in Wales.
- Mary Frances Jones, Head of Administration Services, Federation of Master Builders.
- Roger Jones, Sub-Officer, Hereford and Worcester Fire Brigade.
- Brian Campbell Keenleyside, Police Sergeant, Northumbria Police.
- Norah Rose Kelly, Assistant Company Secretary, London Underground Ltd.
- Anthony Arthur Baxter Kemp. For services to the Community in Tillingham, Essex.
- Norman Goymer Kemp. For services to the Community in Tillingham, Essex.
- Alan Kendell, NAAFI Canteen Manager, HMS Ark Royal.
- Norman Kennedy, Storeman, Ministry of Defence.
- Charles Ernest Kennett, Museum Technician I, Victoria and Albert Museum, Office of Arts and Libraries.
- Dorothea Mary Kerr, Secretary, Belfast Philharmonic Choir.
- Joseph William Kertin. For services to the Birmingham Branch, Royal British Legion.
- Andrew Loudon Kettrick, Porter and Driver, Stirling Royal Infirmary.
- Denis Arthur Killiner. For services to the St. John Ambulance Brigade.
- Joan Margaret Kindred. For services to All Saints Church Guild, Upper Norwood.
- Orlean Patricia King, Nursing Assistant, Maudsley Hospital, Bethlem Royal and Maudsley Special Health Authority.
- Ronald King. For services to the Desborough Allotment Association, Kettering.
- Shirley Diana Kinsey. For Catering Services to the Eastern Area Sea Cadet Corps.
- Alan Knowles, Die Polisher, Tinsley Wire (Sheffield) Ltd.
- Daisy Chiu Nung Kwok, Payroll Assistant, Lee Valley Water Company and For services to the Community in St. Albans.
- Eva Constance Lane. For Voluntary Services to the Northwood and Pinner Cottage Hospital.
- Frank Lane, Trustee, Woodingdean Boys Club, Brighton.
- John Lea. For services to the Southport League of Hospital Friends.
- Barbara Rosalie Lebbon, Personal Secretary, Ministry of Defence.
- Michael Graham Leckey, Constable, Royal Ulster Constabulary.
- Arthur Joseph Leech, Senior Head Gardener, Commonwealth War Graves Commission.
- William Tanner Lennon, lately Coxswain, Donaghadee Lifeboat, County Down, Royal National Lifeboat Institution.
- Charley Levett, lately Fisheries Inspector, National Rivers Authority.
- Jacqueline Ann Lewis, lately Warden, Mid-Devon District Council.
- Walter George Linington, lately Driver, British Road Services, "Islandlink".
- John Graham Lloyd, East Midlands Regional Secretary, Bus and Coach Council.
- Rodney Frederick Lockwood, Engineering Foreman, Southern Electric plc.
- Sydney Cecil Lodge, Reprographics Operator, Roehampton Institute of Higher Education.
- Pamela Long, Revenue Typing Manager, Board of Inland Revenue.
- Kenneth Joseph Luxford, Sergeant, Essex Police.
- William Lyon, Marine Control Room Operator, British Petroleum.
- Donald Macdiarmid, Head Cattleman, Leys Castle Home Farm, Inverness.
- Edward William Mann, Almoner, Allied-Lyons.
- Gerald Sidney Mann, Physical Training Instructor, West Mercia Constabulary.
- Richard James Marks, Sergeant, Lothian and Borders Police.
- Joan Maria Margaret Mauret. For services to the St. George's Memorial Church, Ypres, Belgium.
- James McArthur. For services to the Community in West Lothian.
- Eileen McCarroll, Typist, Northern Ireland Office.
- James Robinson McDowall, lately Joiner and Master of Works, Natural Environment Research Council.
- Daniel McFie, Station Officer Retained, Strathclyde Fire Brigade.
- Leslie Douglas McLachlan, Musical Director and Conductor, St. John Ambulance Silver Band, Southport.
- Edward McMenemy, Rail Transport Office Clerk, Helmstedt.
- Elizabeth Hannah McQuillan, Ward Orderly, Mater Infirmorium Hospital, Belfast.
- Gladys Mary Miles. For Charitable Services to the Bristol Royal Infirmary.
- Arthur Gourlay Mill, Stores Officer Grade 'D', Ministry of Defence.
- Delphine May Milligan, lately Personal Secretary to General Manager, Anglia Region, British Railways.
- Jane Greenlaw Mitchell, Subpostmistress, Cockburnspath Sub Office, The Post Office.
- Desmond Moore. For services to the Outward Memorial Halland Community Centre in Wakefield, Yorkshire.
- Leslie Arthur John Moore. For services to the Boys Brigade in Bristol.
- Glynne Leslie Morgan, Chargeman Hydraulic Repairer, Associated British Ports.
- Dermot Morris, Senior Administrative Assistant, Oxfordshire Fire Service.
- Williamina Catherine Mouat, Instructor for the Severely Handicapped in Lerwick.
- Henry Mowbray, Industrial Foreman, Property Services Agency, Department of the Environment.
- Renee Murfitt. For services to the Bramhall Women's Royal Voluntary Service.
- Denzil Percival Nicholls. For Conservation Services to the Humber Wildfowl Refuge.
- Richard Stuart Nicholls. For Conservation Services to the Humber Wildfowl Refuge.
- Frank John Oakman, Beadle to the Worshipful Company of Haberdashers.
- Elizabeth Julia Marie O'Brien, lately Support Grade Band1 (Senior Messenger), Department of Trade and Industry.
- Norah Mary O'Keeffe, Administrative Officer, Science Museum, Office of Arts and Libraries.
- Eileen Benedict O'Kelly, lately Social Security Officer Grade II, Department of Health and Social Services, Northern Ireland Civil Service.
- Charlotte Elizabeth Ollivant, Voluntary Warden, Studland Heath National Nature Reserve, Dorset.
- Thomas Hartley Ord, Development Engineer, Rolls-Royce and Associates Ltd.
- Andrew Joseph O'Sullivan, Police Constable, Greater Manchester Police.
- Doreen May Oswin, Valuation Clerk, Board of Inland Revenue.
- Alfred John Raymond Owens, Driving Instructor, Road Transport Industry Training Board.
- Eileen Oxendale, Accounts Administrator, Bullen and Partners.
- Keith Brian Pavitt, Higher Instructional Officer, Ministry of Defence.
- Kenneth Edward Peach, lately Ship Plate Machinist, HM Naval Base, Portsmouth, Ministry of Defence.
- Ernest Reginald George Pearce. For services to the Avon County, St. John Ambulance Brigade.
- Gordon Phelan. For services to the "Taunton Aid-in-Sickness Fund", Somerset.
- Andrew Henderson Philip, Station Master, Aberdour Station, Fife, British Rail.
- David Llewelyn Pierce, Assistant Superintendent of Works, Forestry Commission (Wales).
- Kathleen Ann Piggott, Personal Secretary, London Underground Ltd.
- Marion Pigounakis. For services to Wildlife in Devon.
- Annabella Pounder, Support Grade Band 1, Department of Trade and Industry.
- Ronald Frederick Power, Head of Test and Development Group, Royal National Institute for the Deaf.
- Elsie Prangell, Support Grade Band 2, Department of Education and Science.
- Nancy Prentice. For services to the Community in Mid-Glamorgan.
- James Alexander Purdie, Supervisor, W. A. Baxter and Sons Ltd.
- William James Putt, Overhead Line Foreman, Bodmin South West Electricity plc.
- Marion Catherine Puttock, Typist, Ministry of Agriculture, Fisheries and Food.
- Alexander Davie Ramsay, Chargehand Mason, Scottish Office.
- Theodor Wilhelm Werner Rang. For services to the Community in Sark, Channel Islands.
- John Isaac Ratcliffe, Transport Supervisor, GKN Technology Ltd.
- Ann Elizabeth Redman, Personal Assistant and Private Secretary to Chairman, Meyer International plc.
- Ronald George Reeves. For services to the Community in London Wl.
- Mary Eulalie Revers. For services to the Community in Worcestershire.
- Patricia Mary Richards, Support Grade Band 2 (Cleaner), Department of Employment.
- Peter Robert Ricketts. For services to the Mayoralty and the Corporation of London.
- Patricia Joan Rideout, Typist, Department of Social Security.
- Ian Callis Riley, Administrative Officer, Ministry of Defence.
- James Arthur Roberts. For services to the Severn District Reserve, South Western Area, Sea Cadet Corps.
- George Edwin Charles Robinson, lately Fleet Engineer, London Borough of Richmond-upon-Thames.
- Ina Icelene Rodney, Foster Mother, Birmingham Social Services Department.
- George Henry Rowe, Police Constable, Avon and Somerset Constabulary.
- Theodora Margaret Eirene Rudge. For Services to the Community in Dyfed.
- Sheila Philomena Sands, Administrative Officer, Passport Office, Home Office.
- Jane Saunders. For services to the Community in Dartford, Kent.
- Edward John Scott, Works Supervisor, George Houlton and Sons Ltd.
- Eleanor Anne Scullion, School Meals Supervisor, St. Aidan's Primary School, Belfast.
- Barrie Sharkey, Chief Motorcycle Training Instructor, London Borough of Redbridge.
- David Edward Sheppard, Turner, Royal Ordnance.
- Freda Doreen Brooks Short, Secretary and Personal Assistant, Marshall of Cambridge (Engineering) Ltd.
- Lucy Beatrice Shotton. For services to the Community in Stafford.
- Sidney Robert Simpson, Senior Section Leader, British Aerospace (Military Aircraft) Ltd.
- Anne Georgina Skinner, Housekeeper, Lambeth Palace.
- Albert Scott Smith. For Charitable Services in Durham.
- Edward Walter Smith. For services to the Community in Sandy, Bedfordshire.
- Helene Rosina Reeve-Smith. For services to the Clacton Dog Rescue Centre, Essex.
- William Henry Smith, Senior Officer, HM Prison Hospital, Gartree.
- Robert Alexander Speers, Detective Sergeant, Royal Ulster Constabulary.
- Eleanor Mae Spence. For services to the Community in Harrogate, North Yorkshire.
- Audrey Spender. For services to the Llwyneryr Hospital League of Friends, West Glamorgan.
- John Phillip Spickett, Chargehand Craftsman (Coppersmith), Royal Aircraft Establishment, Farnborough, Ministry of Defence.
- Squadron Leader John Edward Spinks, RAF (Ret'd) Civilian Instructor, No.1401 Alfreton and Ripley Squadron, Air Training Corps.
- Zigurds Staks, lately Fisheries Workman, Severn Trent Region, National Rivers Authority.
- Edith Maude Steuart. For services to the Community in East Surrey.
- Marjorie Stevenson, lately Personal Assistant to Colliery Manager, Welbeck Colliery, British Coal.
- Agnes Christina Stewart, Administrative Officer, Department for National Savings.
- John Dewar Stewart, Senior Officer, HM Prison, Barlinnie.
- Harold John Stokes, lately Court Usher, Long Ashton Magistrates Court, Avon.
- Hazel June Stovell, Valuation Clerk, Board of Inland Revenue.
- Ronald Frederick Stow, Signalling Works Supervisor, Western Region British Railways.
- John Thompson, Driver, Caretaker and Groundsman, Drumskinney Primary School, Enniskillen.
- Edith Walker Thomson, Crew Supervisor, No.25 Group, Ayr Royal Observer Corps.
- Norman Thrussell, Electrician, Property Services Agency, Department of the Environment.
- Cyril George Tiltman. For services to Swimming and the Community in Bridport, Dorset.
- Anthony Victor Timbers, Senior Metallurgist, Rolls-Royce and Associates Ltd.
- Royston Victor Frank Torrington. For services to the Community in Derbyshire.
- Ronald James Trott, lately Craftsman (Engraver), Royal Aerospace Establishment, Farnborough, Ministry of Defence.
- Michael Ray Tuck, Treasurer, Area Council, Dorset, Royal British Legion.
- Geoffrey Vause, Senior Calibration Engineer, Rockware Group plc.
- Nigel Jeffrey Wainwright. For services to Road Safety in Essex.
- Derek William Walder. For services to Groundsmanship.
- Graham Pelham Warner, lately Face Worker, Lea Hall Colliery, British Coal.
- Kathleen Beatrice Warrington. For Services to the National Council, Royal Naval Association.
- Alan Watson, Police Sergeant, Durham Constabulary.
- Andrew Clark Watson, lately Skilled Moulder, Glencast Ltd.
- Donald Arthur Serjeant Waudby, Observer, No.14 Group, Winchester Royal Observer Corps.
- Katherine Joan Weeks, Housekeeper and Cook, Farms for City Children.
- John Stanley West, Consultant, Thomas Mason Ltd.
- Edward Morris Gordon Westgate, Process and General Supervisory Grade 'D', Ministry of Defence.
- David John Whiley. For services to Cricket Umpiring.
- Anthony Edward White, Instructor, North Western British Gas plc.
- Irene Mary White, Instructor, Clippens School, Linwood, Renfrewshire.
- Audrey Harriet Whitfield, Senior Enrolled Nurse, East Yorkshire Regional Health Authority.
- Arthur James Wilkins, Secretary, The Kelly Association.
- Valerie Wilkinson, Cook Supervisor, Allertonshire School.
- Bette Gibbon Williams. For services to the Blind in Wales.
- Eluned Williams. For services to Meals-on-Wheels, Aberystwyth Women's Royal Voluntary Service.
- Henry Ray Wilson, lately Crematorium and Cemeteries Officer, Cambridge City Council.
- Norman Peter Wilson, Sub-Officer Retained, Cleveland County Fire Brigade.
- Gerald Nicholas Withers, District Foreman, Bristol Waterworks Company.
- Patricia Womersley, Local Officer II, Department of Social Security.
- Kenneth Andrew Wood. For Charitable Services in Essex.
- Vera Grace Wood, Foster Mother and Childminder, Wiltshire Social Services Department.
- Walter Woods, Links Superintendent, St. Andrews Golf Course, and For services to Greenkeeping.
- Lilla Monica Wright. For services to the Community in Cartmel, Cumbria.
- Gordon Yarborough. For services to the St. John Ambulance Brigade and to Sport.
- Howard Thomas Youdan, Police Sergeant, Merseyside Police, and for Charitable Services.

=== Royal Red Cross ===
==== Members (RRC) ====
Royal Navy

- Chief Nursing Officer Virginia Christabel Fisher, ARRC, Queen Alexandra's Royal Naval Nursing Service.
- Chief Nursing Officer Jillian Nina Last, ARRC, Queen Alexandra's Royal Naval Nursing Service.

Army

- Colonel Sheila Leslie McAulay, ARRC, (494562), Queen Alexandra's Royal Army Nursing Corps.
- Lieutenant Colonel Mary Thomson Pringle (487756), Queen Alexandra's Royal Army Nursing Corps, Territorial Army.

==== Associates (ARRC) ====
Royal Navy

- Superintending Nursing Officer Rosemary Savage, Queen Alexandra's Royal Naval Nursing Service.

Army

- Captain Janet Susan Frances De Mello (516823), Queen Alexandra's Royal Army Nursing Corps.
- Major Rhoda Christine Parks (498857), Queen Alexandra's Royal Army Nursing Corps.
- Major Robert James Price (506304), Royal Army Medical Corps.
- Captain William Leslie Stead (523766), Royal Army Medical Corps, Territorial Army.

=== Air Force Cross (AFC) ===
Royal Air Force

- Flight Lieutenant Stephen McLaughlin (2627019).
- Squadron Leader Brian Walter Newby (8141005).
- Squadron Leader David Roy Southwood (5202328).

=== Queen's Police Medal (QPM) ===
England and Wales

- Malcolm Ramsay Campbell, Commander, Metropolitan Police.
- Edward Michael Crew, Deputy Chief Constable, Kent Constabulary.
- John Frederick Culley, Assistant Chief Constable, Nottinghamshire Constabulary.
- Margaret Gornall, Chief Superintendent, Greater Manchester Police.
- Richard William Hester, Detective Sergeant, Metropolitan Police.
- Edward George Holt, Chief Superintendent, Avon and Somerset Constabulary.
- John Anthony Howley, Deputy Assistant Commissioner, Metropolitan Police.
- Ronald Longstaff, Chief Superintendent, West Midlands Police.
- William Ian McGregor, Assistant Chief Constable, British Transport Police.
- Andrew Hyslop Montgomery, Chief Superintendent, Staffordshire Police.
- Philip Frederick Moseley, Constable, Merseyside Police.
- Keith Povey, Deputy Chief Constable, Northamptonshire Police.
- Peter James Ryan, Chief Constable, Norfolk Constabulary.
- Anthony James Speed, Deputy Assistant Commissioner, Metropolitan Police.
- Clifford Colin Street, lately Chief Superintendent, Cambridgeshire Constabulary.
- Alan Tainsh, lately Detective Constable, West Yorkshire Police.

Channel Islands

- Michael Lemoignan, Chief Officer, Guernsey Police.

Northern Ireland

- Francis Blakely, Chief Inspector, Royal Ulster Constabulary.
- Colin Stanley Burrows, Chief Inspector, Royal Ulster Constabulary.

Scotland

- Douglas William McMurdo, Deputy Chief Constable, Central Scotland Police.
- Richard John Frances Prentice, Assistant Chief Constable, Lothian and Borders Police.

=== Queen's Fire Service Medal (QFSM) ===
England and Wales

- Neil Ernest Gaskarth, Deputy Chief Officer, Dorset Fire Brigade.
- David Michael Pain, Deputy Chief Officer, Hampshire Fire Brigade.
- William Wallace Anderson Redford, Chief Officer, Warwickshire Fire and Rescue Service.
- Gerald Patterson Reid, Chief Officer, Shropshire Fire and Rescue Service.
- Robert Alexander Stevenson, Deputy Chief Officer, East Sussex Fire Brigade.
- Peter John Whitehouse, Deputy Chief Officer, Devon Fire and Rescue Service.
- Harry Thomas Wilson-Webb, Senior Fire Service Officer, Defence Fire Service.

Channel Islands

- Brian Ernest Roy Mallett, Chief Officer, Jersey Fire Brigade.

Scotland

- Donald Grant, Firemaster, Highland and Islands Fire Brigade.

=== Colonial Police and Fire Service Medal (CPM) ===
- George Frederick Noel Acheson, Senior Superintendent, Royal Hong Kong Police Force.
- Richard James Best, Senior Superintendent, Royal Hong Kong Police Force.
- Chan Chun-kei, Station Sergeant, Royal Hong Kong Police Force.
- Chan Kwong-fuk Station Sergeant, Royal Hong Kong Police Force.
- Chan Tak-wang, Principal Fireman, Hong Kong Fire Services.
- Chan Yiu-tin, Principal Fireman, Hong Kong Fire Services.
- Chan Yuk-sang, Station Sergeant, Royal Hong Kong Police Force.
- Chiang Chi-ming, Station Sergeant, Royal Hong Kong Police Force.
- Chow Man-hing, Principal Fireman, Hong Kong Fire Services.
- Ronald James Clibborn-Dyer, Senior Superintendent, Royal Hong Kong Police Force.
- David Archibold Gooding, Detective Superintendent, Royal Cayman Islands Police Force.
- Ho Kwok-hong, Superintendent (Ambulance), Hong Kong Fire Services.
- Robin Curtis Hobbs, Chief Inspector, Royal Hong Kong Police Force.
- Daden Khan, Senior Superintendent, Royal Hong Kong Police Force.
- Lam Chun-man, Senior Divisional Officer, Hong Kong Fire Services.
- Lam Wah-hing, Principal Fireman, Hong Kong Fire Services.
- Michael Liu Chi-yuen, Senior Superintendent, Royal Hong Kong Auxiliary Police Force.
- Miao Hsiung-hsun, Inspector, Royal Hong Kong Police Force.
- Alan Douglas Newton, Superintendent, Royal Hong Kong Police Force.
- George Franklyn Rose, Superintendent, Bermuda Police Force
- Siu Kit-hung, Inspector, Royal Hong Kong Police Force.
- Wong Sik-chung, Station Sergeant, Royal Hong Kong Police Force.
- Wong Yat-lam, Superintendent, Royal Hong Kong Police Force.

=== Queen's Commendation for Valuable Service in the Air ===
Royal Air Force

- Flight Lieutenant Ian James Baston (5203675).
- Squadron Leader Peter Douglas Cottrell (4230816).
- Master Aircrew Robert Edwards (N4133721).
- Squadron Leader Richard Charles Groombridge (3526203).
- Flight Lieutenant Stephen William Malcolm Johnson (8027273), (Retired).
- Flight Lieutenant Charles William McGibbon (2616041).
- Squadron Leader Thomas William Mallorie (8140204).
- Flight Lieutenant Paul Francis Mulkern (4232896).
- Squadron Leader Anthony John Robinson (4165496).
- Flight Lieutenant Michael Verrill (4264779).

== Diplomatic Service and Overseas List ==
=== Knight Bachelor ===
- Leslie Alan Whittome, lately Director, Exchange and Trade Relations Department, IMF, New York.

=== Saint Michael and Saint George ===
==== Knight Grand Cross (GCMG) ====
- Sir David Goodall, KCMG, British High Commissioner, New Delhi.

==== Knight Commander (KCMG) ====
- Stephen Jeremy Barrett, CMG, HM Ambassador, Warsaw.
- Robin John Taylor McLaren, CMG, HM Ambassador, Peking.
- Michael Keith Orlebar Simpson-Orlebar, CMG, HM Ambassador, Mexico City.

==== Companions (CMG) ====
- Graham Hugh Boyce, HM. Ambassador, Doha.
- Colin Richard Budd, Counsellor, HM Embassy, Bonn.
- David John Michael Dain, British High Commissioner, Nicosia.
- Alan Edwin Furness, British Deputy High Commissioner, Bombay.
- Timothy John Burr George, HM Ambassador, Kathmandu.
- Andrew Fleming Green, HM Ambassador, Damascus.
- Jeremy Quentin Greenstock, Foreign and Commonwealth Office.
- Donald Keith Haskell, CVO, HM Ambassador, Lima.
- Paul Lever, Head of the British Delegation to the CFE, Vienna.
- Jeffrey Ling, Foreign and Commonwealth Office.
- William Marsden, HM Ambassador, San Jose.
- Mark Frederick Hakon Scrase-Dickins, Counsellor, HM Embassy, Riyadh.
- William Nigel Wenban-Smith, British High Commissioner, Lilongwe.
- Patrick Francis Michael Wogan, British Deputy High Commissioner, Karachi.

=== Order of the British Empire (Military Division) ===
==== Members (MBE) ====
Army

- Major Kam Yiu-Leung, Royal Hong Kong Regiment (The Volunteers).

Air Force

- Squadron Leader Peter Dicky Yip, AE, Royal Hong Kong Auxiliary Air Force.

=== Order of the British Empire (Civil Division) ===
==== Commanders (CBE) ====
- Robert Arbuthnott, Minister (Cultural Affairs), British High Commission, New Delhi.
- Dr. Michael Peter Bates. For services to British commercial and Community interests in Namibia.
- George Dickson, OBE, lately HM Consul-General, Amsterdam.
- David Stronach Hunter, Justice of Appeal, Hong Kong.
- Li Yuet-ting, Director of Education Hong Kong.
- Eric Cloran O'Brien. For services to British commercial interests in Canada.
- Dr Wang Gungwu. For public and community services in Hong Kong.
- Edward Barrie Wiggham, JP, Secretary for the Civil Service, Hong Kong.
- Colin Wilson, HM Consul-General, Sydney.
- Terence Leslie William Windle, lately Director, Agriculture Directorate-General, E.C. Commission, Brussels.
- Wong Chung-hin, JP. For public and community services in Hong Kong.

==== Officers (OBE) ====
- John Towers Abaza. For services to British cultural and Community interests in the Sudan.
- Michael Joachim Walter Borner. For services to British interests in Bahrain.
- Stuart Armitage Brooks, First Secretary, HM Embassy, Stockholm.
- Chung Pui-lam, JP. For public services in Hong Kong.
- Michael Alistair Corbett, First Secretary (Commercial), HM Embassy, Warsaw.
- John Howard Davies. For services to agricultural development in Nigeria.
- James Kerr Findlay, QC, JP, Law Officer, Legal Department, Hong Kong.
- Alan Clive Goodridge, Adviser, Accountant General's Department, The Gambia.
- Robert William Griffith. For public and community services in Montserrat.
- Dr. John David Grote, Science Officer, British Council, Japan.
- Albert Brian Gundersen, First Secretary, HM Embassy, Prague.
- John Hanlon. For services to British aviation interests in Nigeria.
- William John Skeffington Hudson. For services to British interests in Zambia.
- Michael Peter Frank Ingham. For services to British commercial interests in Belgium.
- Dr. Ronald Leung Ding-bong, JP. For public and community services in Hong Kong.
- Professor Felice Lieh-Mak. For public and community services in Hong Kong.
- Kenneth Charles Messere, lately Head of Fiscal Affairs Division, OECD, Paris.
- David Ivimey Miller, lately Head of Research Section, Political Directorate, NATO HQ, Brussels.
- Roger James Glanville Neild, lately Chief of Security, United Nations Office, Geneva.
- Anthony William Nicolle, Commissioner of Banking, Hong Kong.
- Terence Sandell, Counsellor (Cultural Affairs), HM Embassy, Moscow.
- John Albert Thorpe, QPM, CPM, Deputy Commissioner of Police, Hong Kong.
- Nicholas Richard White. For services to British interests in Somalia.

==== Members (MBE) ====
- Nadir Ali Fazal Ahmed, Assistant Management Officer, British Consulate-General, Aden.
- Audrey Alessi, Personal Assistant, British Information Services, New York.
- Francis Parton Barber, Honorary British Consul, San Pedro Sula, Honduras.
- Patricia Barral, Personal Assistant to the Commercial Counsellor, HM Embassy, Madrid.
- Joseph Bautista. For public services in Gibraltar.
- Wilhelmina Morrison Beveridge, lately Personal Assistant to HM Ambassador, Oslo.
- Margaret Ann Browne. For services to education and the Community in Montserrat.
- Cheung Kuen. For public services in Hong Kong.
- Reginald Chapman Cooper, JP. For public and community services in Bermuda.
- Michael Ivan Davis. For services to development projects in Zambia.
- Sheila Heather Davis. For educational and welfare services to the Community in Nigeria.
- Elizabeth Catherine Jane Deeks. For educational and welfare services to the Community in Nigeria.
- Stanley John Raymond Dodd. For services to British interests in Zaire.
- Simon Eddy Elazar, Commercial Officer, British Consulate-General, Casablanca.
- Frances Winifred Joan Evans, Secretary, Information Section, HM Embassy, Buenos Aires.
- David Philip Gething, lately Consul, HM Embassy, Mogadishu.
- The Reverend Father Damian Grimes. For services to education in Uganda.
- Sheila Hamilton-Smith, Second Secretary (Management), HM Embassy, Havana.
- Irene Rosina Harris. For nursing and welfare services to the Community in Algeria.
- Susan Headlam. For nursing and welfare services to the Community in Bangladesh.
- Joyce Beryl Jones. For welfare services to the British Community in Paris.
- Lai Kwok-hung, Senior Superintendent, Customs & Excise Service, Hong Kong.
- Robert Douglas Grant Laing. For services to the Community in the Turks and Caicos Islands.
- Rose Lamchen Jing-han, Director of Nursing, Hong Kong.
- Li Kwing-yee, Chief Pharmacist, Hong Kong.
- Ronald Vincent Lightbown. For services to British commercial interests in Bahrain.
- Milton Edward McCann. For welfare services to children in Calcutta.
- Barbara Sally McKibbin. For welfare services to refugees in South Africa.
- Douglas Craghill Robert Mackmurdie. For services to the aid development programme in Bangladesh.
- Anne Marden, JP. For community services in Hong Kong.
- John Ernest Derek Morton, lately Chief Security Officer, HM Embassy, Addis Ababa.
- Robert Gordon Noble. For services to British interests in Mogadishu.
- Derek John North, Consul, British High Commission, Kuala Lumpur.
- John Francis Osborne. For services to agricultural development in Thailand.
- Ethel Eloise Reid, Chief Nursing Officer, Cayman Islands.
- Robert Alexander Duthie McVey Reoch. For services to British cultural and Community interests in California.
- Paul Louis Savignon. For public and community services in Gibraltar.
- Pat Wesley Smith. For services to the British Community in Buenos Aires.
- Thomas Smith. For services to fisheries development in the Solomon Islands.
- Arthur Thomas Stevens, Chief Security Officer, HM Embassy, Paris.
- David Thomas Tait. For services to the British Community in Qatar.
- Tang Kam-yan, Principal land Executive, Hong Kong.
- David Ronald Ward, Translator, HM Embassy, Bonn.
- Lawrence Moore Warner, lately Honorary British Representative, Apia, Western Samoa.
- Wong Wah-sang. For community services in Hong Kong.
- Christopher Joseph Woods-McConville, Director, British Council, East Jerusalem.
- William Sears Zuill. For public services in Bermuda.

=== Imperial Service Order (ISO) ===
- Horace Raymond Knight, MBE, JP, Director of Technical Education, Hong Kong.
- Peter Lok Kung-nam, Director of Civil Aviation, Hong Kong.
- Miao Chi, JP, Director of Electrical & Mechanical Services, Hong Kong.

=== British Empire Medal (Civil Division) ===
- Clive John Baker. For services to Rowing in Gibraltar.
- Chan Kwok-chan, Senior Clerical Officer, Transport Department, Hong Kong.
- Michael Ho Kam-tat, Branch Commander, Auxiliary Medical Services, Hong Kong.
- Philip Archibald Leung, Senior Clerical Officer, Hospital Services Department, Hong Kong.
- Edmond Lok Ka-yiu, Mould Laboratory Technologist, Hospital Services Department, Hong Kong.
- Nadine McLean, Assistant Accountant, Civil Aviation Department, Cayman Islands.
- Mak Kai-ki, Senior Interpreter, Police Department, Hong Kong.
- Barbara Sit Woon-ling, Senior Personal Secretary, Immigration Department, Hong Kong.
- Yue Yun-hing. For services to Table Tennis in Hong Kong.

=== Queen's Police Medal (QPM) ===
Hong Kong

- Barrie Joseph Deegan, CPM, Assistant Commissioner of Police, Royal Hong Kong Police Force.
- Robert Anthony Steele, CPM, Assistant Commissioner of Police, Royal Hong Kong Police Force.

=== Queen's Fire Service Medal (QFSM) ===
Bermuda

- Reginald Alfred Rawlins, Chief Fire Officer, Bermuda Fire Service.

== Antigua and Barbuda ==
=== Order of the British Empire (Civil Division) ===
==== Officer (OBE) ====
- Audrey Brontilla Henry. For public service.

== Bahamas ==
=== Order of the British Empire (Civil Division) ===
==== Member (MBE) ====
- Austin Henry Grant, Jr, JP. For services to the community.

=== British Empire Medal (Civil Division) ===
- Richard Ebenezar Ferguson, Senior JP. For services to the community.
- Lillian Knowles. For public service.

== Belize ==
=== Order of the British Empire (Civil Division) ===
==== Commander (CBE) ====
- Eric William King, OBE. For services to agriculture.

==== Officer (OBE) ====
- David Lawrence McKoy. For public service.

==== Member (MBE) ====
- Belizario Ramon Carballo. For services to education.
- Marion Bernadette Burns Cornejo. For services to the community.

== Grenada ==
=== Order of the British Empire (Civil Division) ===
==== Officer (OBE) ====
- Alphonsus Christopher Redhead. For public service.

=== British Empire Medal (Civil Division) ===
- Kernal Alexander Clarke. For public service.
- Winston Carlton Lionel Dragon. For service to the community.
- Denis Joseph Ison. For public service.

== Mauritius ==
=== Order of the British Empire (Civil Division) ===
==== Commander (CBE) ====
- Francois Marie Alphonse De Grivel. For services to industry.

==== Officers (OBE) ====
- Shantilal Dhanjee. For services to education.
- Abdool Hamid Malleck-Amode. For services to industrial relations.

==== Members (MBE) ====
- Rambhajun Babooa. For services to the community.
- Hemraz Bahorun. For public service.
- Anunta Bhiwajee. For services to the community.
- Osman Lallmahomed. For public service.
- Canniah Luchmaya. For services to the community.
- Seewah Pragassen Muthiayen. For public service.
- Seewooduth Toofanny. For services to the community.

=== Mauritius Police Medal (MPM) ===
- Louis Gabriel De Casanove, Superintendent of Police.
- Pierre Lucien Roland Olivier, Assistant Superintendent of Police.
- Dewo Pursad Budloo, Assistant Superintendent of Police.
- Philippe Jean Bruneau, Chief Inspector of Police.
- Leon Yan Young Sam Soon, Police Sergeant.

== Saint Lucia ==
=== Order of the British Empire (Civil Division) ===
==== Commander (CBE) ====
- Dr. Vaughan Allen Lewis. For public service.

==== Officer (OBE) ====
- Robert Joseph Devaux, MBE. For public service.
- Edwin Pontien Joseph Laurent. For public service.

==== Member (MBE) ====
- Amur Ambroise. For services to the community.
- Cyril Ignatius James. For services to the community.

== Solomon Islands ==
=== Order of the British Empire (Civil Division) ===
==== Officer (OBE) ====
- Dr. Pimbo Ogatuti. For services to health.

==== Member (MBE) ====
- James Uma. For services to the construction industry.

== Saint Vincent and the Grenadines ==
=== Order of the British Empire (Civil Division) ===
==== Member (MBE) ====
- Daphne Luenda Frederick-Grant. For services to the community.
- Nesta Lucy Paynter. For services to the community.

== Tuvalu ==
=== British Empire Medal (Civil Division) ===
- Manoa Manoa. For public service.
- Nalei Paka. For services to health.
- Siuila Toloa. For services to the community.
