= Keith Sykes =

Keith Sykes may refer to

- Keith Sykes (anaesthetist) (1925–2019), English physician
- Keith Sykes (musician) (born 1948), American singer-songwriter
