= Admiral McLean =

Admiral McLean may refer to:

- Rear Admiral Walter McLean (U.S. Navy officer) (1855–1930), USN, American commander of the Norfolk Naval Shipyard
- Rear Admiral Ridley McLean (1872–1933), USN
- Vice Admiral Rory McLean (1950–2021), British Royal Navy
- Surgeon Rear-Admiral Timothy Blair McLean (1910–1982), Royal Canadian Navy
