= Doncaster Business School =

Coordinates: 53.511°N 1.235°W

Doncaster Business School was the business school of Doncaster College, England. Established in 1992, as Dearne Valley Business School, the school offered postgraduate business degrees in management, including MBAs and professional qualifications (CIPD, CIM, CMI, ILM) as well as undergraduate teaching. It was based on the college's High Melton campus, which closed in 2017.

== High Melton ==
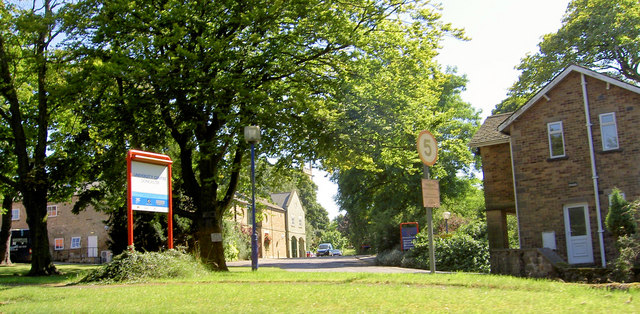
Entrance to the college grounds in High Melton

The school is situated in High Melton within the University Centre (validated by the University of Hull and the University of Wales). Site facilities include a nine-hole golf course, learning resource centre and restaurant. High Melton is a small village, dominated by its church and nearby Hall. From the late seventeenth century, the Hall was owned by the Fountayne family and its descendants, the Wilson family, which changed its name to Montagu following an inheritance. The family were major landowners. In 1883, Andrew Montagu was the owner of over 27,000 acres (110 km^{2}) of land in five counties. The Hall is now one of the main buildings on the High Melton campus.

== CoVE ==
The school was awarded the status of Centre of Vocational Excellence by the Learning Skills Council (LSC) in 2003. It has 500 students on undergraduate, postgraduate and professional programmes, and offers a general MBA. Part-time and flexible modes of study are available.

== Qualifications ==
Employees of BAE Systems, Marconi, Barnsley MBC, Royal Mail, Ivensys, Mitie, Bridon, Avesta Sheffield, AXA Insurance, Haslam Homes and the Home Office have studied at the school. The average age on the part-time MBA is 37. Male to female ratio for full-time and part-time is about 60:40.

The school offers courses and seminars in entrepreneurship and innovation management via the Innovation Academy.
