= Jack Howell (physician) =

British physician

Professor Jack Howell CBE, FRCP
- Born: John Bernard Lloyd Howell; 1 August 1926; Swansea, Wales
- Died: 1 January 2015 (aged 88)
- Education: Middlesex Hospital
- Employers: Manchester Royal Infirmary; University of Southampton

John Bernard Lloyd Howell CBE FRCP (1 August 1926 – 1 January 2015) was a British physician.

Howell was born in Swansea on 1 August 1926, the son of Hilda Mary Howell née Hill, and David John Howell, an architect. He qualified at the Middlesex Hospital in 1950 and in 1957–1958 was granted a Medical Research Council Fellowship at Johns Hopkins Hospital in Baltimore.

From 1960 to 1969 he worked as senior lecturer and consultant physician at Manchester Royal Infirmary.

In 1969 he was appointed foundation professor of medicine at the University of Southampton, becoming emeritus on his retirement in 1991. He was also dean of the Faculty of Medicine there from 1978 to 1983.

He served as president of the British Thoracic Society from 1988 to 1989, as president of the British Medical Association from 1989 to 1990, and as chairman of the Southampton Health Authority from 1983 to 1998.

He was made a Commander of the Order of the British Empire (CBE) in the 1991 Birthday Honours.

He died on 1 January 2015.
