= Noise Abatement Society =

British charitable organization

The Noise Abatement Society is a UK company with the charitable aims of raising awareness of, and finding solutions to, noise pollution.

The Noise Abatement Society was established by John Connell in 1959. John Connell lobbied and got the Noise Abatement Act passed through Parliament in 1960. He was awarded an OBE for his efforts for the Society in 1991.

Over the years it has campaigned for the reduction of unnecessary noise from various sources, co-developed international soundscape standards, conducted research and assisted those who suffer from unreasonable noise, for example, providing a telephone helpline.

The commercial arm of The Noise Abatement Society, Quiet Mark, was established in 2012 by John Connell's daughter, Gloria Elliott, OBE, and granddaughter, Poppy Szkiler.

The John Connell Awards is an annual program organised by The Noise Abatement Society. The Wellcome Collection holds some archives relevant to the activities conducted by the Noise Abatement Society, that were gifted by the society in 2014, including resources regarding the John Connell Awards.
