= Jeffery John Mumford Speed =

Jeffery John Mumford Speed CBE FRSA FInstLM FRGS
- Born: 3 October 1936
- Education: Bedford Modern School
- Known for: Director of Fundraising, Conservative Central Office (1995–96)

Jeffery John Mumford Speed CBE FRSA FInstLM FRGS (born 3 October 1936) was Director of Fundraising and the Treasurer's Department at Conservative Central Office (1995–96). Speed was described as the "ultimate party worker", a party stalwart, and he was credited with turning around the party's finances, wiping-out over twelve million pounds in the party's deficit and building-up the party coffers before the 1996 elections.

== Early life ==
Jeffery John Mumford Speed was born on 3 October 1936, the son of Herbert Victor Speed and Dorothy Barbara Speed (née Mumford). He was educated at Bedford Modern School.

== Career ==
Speed started his career in commerce with General Motors before being made a Conservative Party Agent (1965–78). He was election agent for the Rt Hon. Iain MacLeod (1970); Cecil Parkinson (1970); and the Rt Hon. Edward Heath (1974).

Speed held a number of positions at Conservative Central Office including Director of Constituency Services (1993–95) before becoming the Director of Fundraising (1995–96). Speed was described as the "ultimate party worker", a party stalwart, and he was credited with turning around the party's finances, wiping-out over twelve million pounds in the party's deficit and building-up the party coffers before the 1996 elections. He mysteriously resigned just before those elections, due, it was said, to a disagreement with Dr Brian Mawhinney, the Conservative Party Chairman.

== Awards and honours ==
Speed is a Fellow of the Institute of Leadership and Management. He was made a Fellow of the Royal Society of Arts in 1993 and a Fellow of the Royal Geographical Society in 2003.

Speed was invested as a Commander of the Order of the British Empire in 1991.

== Personal life ==
In 1985, Speed married Hilary Anne Busfield, daughter of the late Haley Busfield of Mayfield, Sussex. His interests include antique maps (especially those by John Speed), oenology, travel (particularly in Spain), musical theatre and film. He is a member of the Royal Over-Seas League.

Jeffery Speed is the brother of Sir Herbert Keith Speed and a direct descendant of John Speed.

== Publications ==
- Tudor townscapes: the town plans from John Speed's: "Theatre of the Empire of Great Britaine 1610". Published Waddesdon, Buckinghamshire, 2000
