= Quiet Mark (certification) =

UK-based product noise certification programme

Quiet Mark is a UK-based international certification programme for products assessed as having lower noise output or effective noise-reduction performance.

== History ==
Poppy Szkiler and Gloria Elliott founded the programme in 2011. Quiet Mark is associated with the Noise Abatement Society. It is federally registered as a certification mark in the United States.

In 2017, the European Environment Agency identified Quiet Mark as a consumer labelling scheme for choosing quieter appliances. A 2021 BBC News report on household appliance noise described testing at Quiet Mark’s laboratory and examined the limitations of decibel-based comparisons for consumers. Writing in The Telegraph in 2025, journalist Susie Mesure reported that the COVID-19 pandemic had accelerated manufacturers’ investment in quieter products, as home working made people more aware of noise in their homes. The Financial Times has also covered Quiet Mark in the context of growing demand for quieter homes and products, and in a 2026 feature testing Quiet Mark-recommended consumer products.

== Certification criteria ==
The programme certifies household appliances, technology and building products. Its assessment process covers both sound level and sound quality, not just decibel measurements, because sounds of similar loudness can differ in pitch and tonal character. Certified categories include kitchen appliances, laundry machines, fans, garden equipment, heating systems (including heat pumps), and acoustic building products such as flooring and wall panels.
