= Roland Smith (businessman) =

British academic and businessman (1928–2003)

Sir Roland Smith (1 October 1928 – 20 November 2003) was a British academic and businessman. He was the chief executive of several prominent companies.
