= Rory McLean =

Vice Admiral Rory McLean CB OBE
- Born: 4 April 1950
- Died: 5 September 2021 (aged 71); London, England
- Military career
- Allegiance: United Kingdom
- Branch: Royal Navy
- Rank: Vice Admiral
- Commands: HMS Fearless; HMS Invincible
- Awards: Companion of the Order of the Bath; Officer of the Order of the British Empire

Vice Admiral Rory Alistair Ian McLean, CB, OBE (4 April 1950 – 5 September 2021) was a senior Royal Navy officer.

== Naval career ==
McLean was born in April 1950. He became commanding officer of the amphibious transport dock HMS Fearless in 1995, Director of Navy Plans at the Ministry of Defence in 1997 and commanding officer of the aircraft carrier HMS Invincible in 1999. He went on to be Assistant Chief of the Defence Staff (Resources and Plans) in 2001 and Deputy Chief of the Defence Staff (Health) in 2004 before leaving the Royal Navy in 2007.

He was appointed an Officer of the Order of the British Empire in the 1991 Birthday Honours and a Companion of the Order of the Bath in the 2004 Birthday Honours.

McLean died in September 2021.
