= Labour Relations Agency (Northern Ireland) =

Northern Irish public body

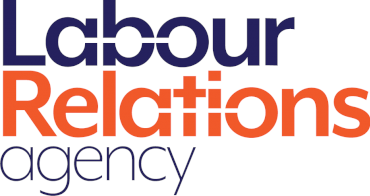

Non-Departmental Public Body overview
- Formed: 1976
- Jurisdiction: Northern Ireland
- Headquarters: James House, Cromac Avenue, Gasworks, Belfast
- Minister responsible: Caoimhe Archibald, Minister for the Economy
- Non-Departmental Public Body executive: Gordon Milligan, Chairperson
- Website: http://www.lra.org.uk

The Labour Relations Agency (LRA) is a non-departmental public body in Northern Ireland responsible for promoting the improvement of industrial relations. Founded in 1976, the Agency is independent of Government and funded by a grant from the Department for the Economy.

The management of the Labour Relations Agency is vested in the LRA Board. The current Chairperson is Gordon Milligan. The rest of the board is made up of experienced trade unionists and industry and employment law specialists. The LRA's staff are led by Chief Executive, Mark McAllister and are based in the Agency's head office in Belfast's Gasworks, with a Regional Office team based in Richmond Chambers in Derry.

== Functions ==
The Labour Relations Agency provides free, impartial and confidential services to anyone involved in the world of work in Northern Ireland, including employers, workers and trade unions. The Agency provides guidance, training and resources to help workers and employers understand their employment rights and responsibilities. It also provides a range of workplace dispute resolution services including conciliation, mediation and arbitration services. It has a dedicated helpline (its Workplace Information Service) available on 03300 333 500.

As part of conciliating disputes, the Agency held collective conciliation meetings between Caterpillar and unions over a "take it or leave it" offer to staff, and facilitated talks between AG and GMB over a 2.5% pay offer.
