= Roy Inman =

British judoka

Roy Inman 9th Dan, OBE
Personal information
- Nationality: England
- Born: 30 April 1946 Hounslow. London
- Died: 30 May 2015 (aged 69)

Sport
- Country: Great Britain
- Sport: Judo
- Rank: kudan
Medal record
Representing United Kingdom
Men's Judo
British Open
Gold medal – first place	1969 British Open	-93 kg
Gold medal – first place	1970 British Open	-93 kg
Bronze medal – third place	1972 British Open	-93 kg
Swedish Open
Gold medal – first place	1972 Swedish Open	-93 kg
Dutch Open
Bronze medal – third place	1975 Dutch Open	-80 kg

Roy Inman OBE was a British judoka, coach and author.

== Biography ==
Roy Inman was born 30 April 1946 in Hounslow, London. He died on 30 May 2015, aged 69. Spouse - Carol Inman..... Children - Maria, Jennifer, Peter...... Grandchildren - Samantha, Alexander, Jessica, Jade, Harry, Jamie..... Great Grand Children - Charlie, Oliver, Leah, Theodore

== Judo career ==
Inman started Judo at the Budokwai in London in 1964. He was an international competitor for 12 years, winning two British Open titles, trained in Japan under Isao Okano and ran Fairholme Judo club for 30 years.

He was the British Judo Association National Coach for over 15 years and coached at 4 Olympic Games. Competitors that he coached in that time won 6 Olympic Medals and 14 World Championships. He was Head Coach, and Judo Technical Director for the University of Bath's High Performance Judo Program for 10 years.

Inman was Director of High Wycombe Judo Centre Ltd for over 20 years, and a Director of the British Judo Association Ltd and the British Judo Association Competitions and Events Ltd for over 6 years. Previously he was a member of the B.J.A Management Committee. Formerly Finance Director of a Hire Purchase Firm.

A Coach and Educator, he was a leading deliverer of the B.J.A Club Coach Award, and the architect of the B.J.A Instructor Award. He is a lecturer for the European Judo Union on their suite of Coach Awards, teaching on the E.J.U Level 4 Performance Coach Award at Anglia Ruskin University, Cambridge. Chairman of the B.J.A Coaching Commission since 2010, and Chair of the B.J.A Promotions Commission from 2008.

He served on the board of directors of the British Judo Association from 2001. He was named U.K. coach of the year in 1991, the O.B.E. from H.M. the Queen in 1992 and a Full Blue from the University of Bath in 2001.

The International Judo Federation awarded Inman the grade of 9th Dan in May 2013.

== Books ==
A selection of books written by Roy Inman include:

- The Junior Promotion Syllabus 1981
- The Kyu Grade Syllabus 1981
- The Dan Grade Syllabus 1981
- Judo For Women 1987
- Contest Judo 1987
- Olympic Judo 1990
- The Skills of the Game 1995
- The Judo Handbook 2005
- The Ju Jitsu Handbook 2006
- BJA Technical Grading Syllabus 2008

== Awards ==
- Awarded O.B.E From Queen Elizabeth
- British Coach for 15 years
- Awarded UK International Coach of the Year 1991
- Author of 10 Books
- Coached at 4 Olympic Games, Won 6 Olympic Medals And 14 World Championships
- Awarded 9th Dan (By International Judo Federation)
- Vice President of the B.J.A
