= Keith Sykes (anaesthetist) =

English anaesthetist (1925–2019)

Professor Sir Keith Sykes FRCA FFARCS
- Born: Malcolm Keith Sykes; 13 September 1925; Clevedon, Somerset, England
- Died: 17 November 2019 (aged 94); Dorset, England
- Resting place: Exeter, England
- Spouse: Michelle June Ratcliffe (m. 1956)

Sir Malcolm Keith Sykes FRCA FFARCS (13 September 1925 – 17 November 2019) was an English consultant anaesthetist.

== Early life and education ==
Sykes was born in Clevedon, Somerset, the only son of economist Joseph Sykes OBE (1899–1967) and Phyllis Mary Greenwood. He studied at Magdalene College, Cambridge, then underwent training in anaesthetics while serving in the Royal Army Medical Corps, and at University College Hospital and Massachusetts General Hospital.

== Career ==
In 1958, he joined the Postgraduate Medical School at Hammersmith Hospital as a lecturer in anaesthesia and consultant anaesthetist, becoming a reader there in 1967 and a professor of clinical anaesthesia in 1970.

He joined the University of Oxford as Nuffield professor of anaesthetics in 1980 and became an Honorary Fellow of Pembroke College in 1996.

He is the author of books about the clinical measurement, treatment of respiratory failure, and the history of anaesthesia.

A 1997 interview with him, by Lady Wendy Ball, is in Oxford Brookes' Medical Sciences Video Archive, catalogue number MSVA159.

He was knighted in the 1991 Birthday Honours, and has also been elected a Fellow of the Royal College of Anaesthetists, (FFARCS), an Honorary Fellow of the Australian and New Zealand College of Anaesthestists (HonFANZCA) and an Honorary Fellow of the College of Anaesthetists of South Africa (HonFCA (SA)).
