= Institute of Leadership =

UK professional membership body for leaders and managers

The Institute of Leadership
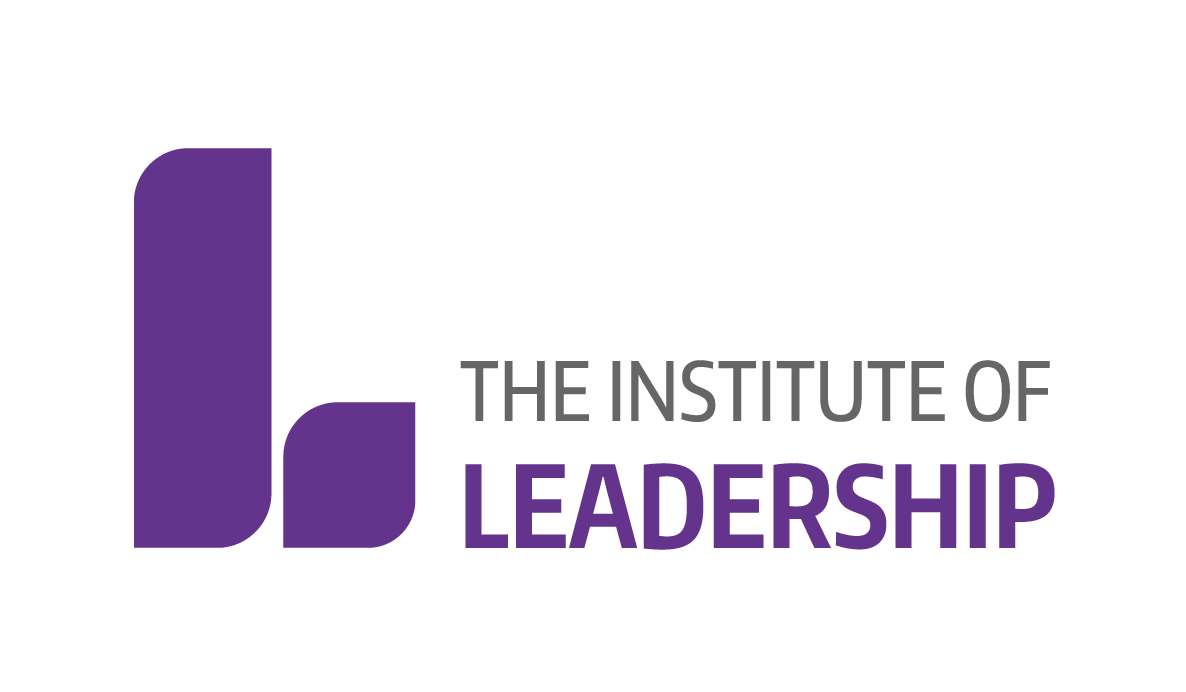
- Type: Non-profit organisation
- Industry: Professional membership
- Incorporated: 1958
- Founded: 1947
- Headquarters: Birmingham, UK
- Key people: John Mark Williams (CEO)
- Products: Membership, Programme accreditation, Leadership development, Research
- Subsidiaries: ABE
- Website: leadership.global

The Institute of Leadership is a UK-based professional membership body for leaders, managers, coaches and mentors. It exists to inspire and support leadership development through membership, programme accreditation, research, events, and resources for individuals and organisations worldwide.

The Institute of Leadership's mission is to "inspire great leadership everywhere", and promote leadership as a practice that can be influenced at all levels of society and business, rather than being defined solely by formal authority or position.

Incorporated in 1958, the organisation is a registered charity in England, Wales and Scotland, and is governed by a board of trustees.

== Membership ==
Membership of The Institute of Leadership is open to individuals at all stages of their leadership journey, from those new to leadership or management through to senior leaders. The Institute also offers membership to tutors who have acquired Institute Approved accreditation for their courses. Corporate solutions (including membership for employees) are also available to organisations.

Professional Membership consists of three grades which entitle the member to use post-nominal letters: Associate Member (AIoL), Member (MIoL) and Fellow (FIoL). Membership is validated with an official membership certificate and a digital credential for online sharing.

== Insights & Research ==
The Institute of Leadership offers a variety of thought leadership content. Its quarterly leadership journal EDGE is available to members online and by post, consisting of leadership trends and insights, research reports and interviews with industry experts. The Institute also publishes a blog examining leadership issues, offering commentary, advice and organisational news.

== History ==
The Institute traces its origins to 1947, when The Institute of Supervision and Management (ISM) was founded. In 1964, the National Examining Board for Supervision and Management (formerly the National Examining Board for Supervisory Studies) was established as an independent, autonomous body administered by the City and Guilds of London Institute.

In November 2001, The Institute of Supervision and Management and the National Examining Board for Supervision and Management, merged to form The Institute of Leadership & Management, operating as part of the City & Guilds Group. In December 2016, The Institute of Leadership separated from City & Guilds, becoming an independent membership body. The accreditation activities remained with City & Guilds under the name ILM.

On 3 April 2023, ABE became an independent subsidiary of The Institute of Leadership.
