= United States Dance Championships =

The annual United States Dance Championships (USDC), previously called the United States Ballroom Championships (USBC) and the United States DanceSport Championships (USDSC), is recognized by the National Dance Council of America (NDCA) and the World Dance & DanceSport Council (WD&DSC) as determining the majority of the United States national professional ballroom dance champions.

The competition was held annually from 1971 to 1974 in New York City at the Waldorf-Astoria Hotel. It was held in Washington, DC, in 1975, and then returned to the Waldorf-Astoria in New York City from 1976 to 1981. In 1982, it was held at the Felt Forum at Madison Square Garden, returning to the Waldorf-Astoria in 1983, and was shared by the two venues in 1984. The competition moved to the Miami (Florida) area in 1985. The competition, now held since 2007 in Orlando, Florida, will celebrate its 37th year in 2008 (September 2nd through 6th).

Although the NDCA and WD&DSC recognize the United States Dance Championships as determining the professional United States Champions, the International DanceSport Federation (IDSF), the United States Olympic Committee (USOC), and the Amateur Sports Act of the United States Congress recognize USA Dance, formerly known as the United States Amateur Ballroom Dance Association (USABDA), as the National Governing Body in the United States for DanceSport (i.e., competitive ballroom dancing). USA Dance holds the annual USA Dance National DanceSport Championships where top dance couples are awarded the opportunity to represent the United States at IDSF World Championships.

== See also ==
- U.S. National Dancesport Champions (Professional Standard)
- U.S. National Dancesport Champions (Professional Latin)
- U.S. National Dancesport Champions (Professional Smooth)
- U.S. National Dancesport Champions (Professional Rhythm)
- U.S. National Dancesport Champions (Professional 9-Dance)
- U.S. National Dancesport Champions (Professional Cabaret/Exhibition)
- USA Dance
- United States Amateur Ballroom Dance Association (USABDA)
- USA Dance National DanceSport Championships
- Dancesport World Champions (Ten Dance)
- Dancesport World Champions (Professional Standard)
- Dancesport World Champions (Professional Latin)
