= Professional Showdance World Champions =

List of all World Professional Showdance World Champions, July 2017:

- 1989 Marcus and Karen Hilton - England
- 1990 Micheal Hull and Patsy Hull-Krogull - Germany
- 1991 Micheal Hull and Patsy Hull-Krogull - Germany
- 1992 Jens Jorgens and Kersten Jorgens-Neubert - Germany
- 1993 Marcus and Karen Hilton - England
- 1994 Marcus and Karen Hilton - England
- 1995 Kim Rygel and Cecilie Rygel- Norway
- 1996 Timothy Howson and Joanne Bolton - England
- 1997 Massimo Giorgianni and Alessia Giorgianni - Italy
- 1998 Massimo Giorgianni and Alessia Giorgianni - Italy
- 1999 Massimo Giorgianni and Alessia Giorgianni - Italy
- 2000 Massimo Giorgianni and Alessia Giorgianni - Italy
- 2001 Massimo Giorgianni and Alessia Giorgianni - Italy
- 2002 Massimo Giorgianni and Alessia Giorgianni - Italy
- 2003 William Pino and Alessandra Bucciarelli - Italy
- 2004 Jonathan Wilkins and Katusha Demidova - USA
- 2005 Sergey Mikheev and Anastasia Sidoran - Russia
- 2006 Roberta Villa and Morena Colagreco - Italy
- 2007 Guoyong Zhang and Hunahuan She - China
- 2008 Stanislav Bekmametov and Natalia Urban - Italy
- 2009 Roberto Regnoli and Tania Berto - Italy
- 2010 Paolo Bosco and Silvia Pitton - Italy
- 2011 Fabrizio Cravero and Loreno Cravero - Italy
- 2012 Ivan Krylov and Natalia Smirnova - Russia
- 2013 Stefan Zoglauer and Sandra Koperski - Germany
- 2014 Stefan Zoglauer and Sandra Koperski - Germany
- 2015 Paul Lorenz and Yulia Spesivtseva - Russia
- 2016 Alexandr Zhiratkov and Irina Novozhilova - Russia
- 2017 Craig Shaw and Evgeniya Shaw - England

== See also ==
- World Ballroom Dance Champions
- World Latin Dance Champions
