= U.S. National Dancesport Champions (Professional Standard) =

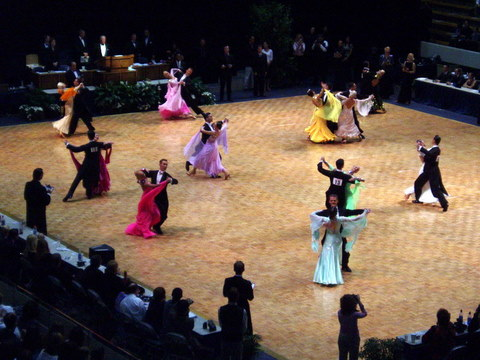
2005 U.S. National Professional Standard Championships, hosted by BYU

The United States national professional ballroom dance champions are crowned at the United States Dance Championships (formerly USDSC, and USBC), as recognized by the National Dance Council of America (NDCA) and the World Dance & DanceSport Council (WD&DSC).

The Professional Standard section (occasionally called Professional Modern, in British tradition) of DanceSport covers the dances waltz, tango, viennese waltz, foxtrot and quickstep.

== U.S. National Champions ==
U.S. National Professional Standard Ballroom Dance / Dancesport Champions
| 1966–1970 | Larry & Betty Silvers | Maryland |
| 1971–1973 | Joe & Nancy Jenkins | (Washington, D.C.) D.C. |
| 1974–1975 | Ken Sloan & Sheila Webber-Sire | California |
| 1976–1978 | Bill Davies & Sandra Cameron | (New York (state)) New York |
| 1979–1982 | Brian & Kristi McDonald | California |
| 1983 | Stephen & Rita Cullip | California |
| 1984–1986 | Brian & Susan Puttock | Nevada |
| 1987–1990 | Victor Veyrasset & Cynthia Dostal | California |
| 1991 | Stephen & Elizabeth Cullip | (Washington (state)) Washington |
| 1992 | Victor Veyrasset & Kathryn Schaffer | California |
| 1993–1997 | Victor Veyrasset & Heather Smith | California |
| 1998–2006 | Jonathan Wilkins & Katusha Demidova | (New York (state)) New York |
| 2007–2017 | Arunas Bizokas & Katusha Demidova | (New York (state)) New York |
| 2018-2019 | Victor Fung & Anastasia Muravyeva | California |
| 2020 | Not held due to Covid-19 pandemic | |
| 2021 | Iaroslav Bieliei & Liliia Bieliei | California |
| 2022-2023 | Valerio Colantoni & Anna Demidova | New Jersey |
| 2024-2026 | Valeriu Ursache & Liana Bakhtiarova | California |

== See also ==
- U.S. National Dancesport Champions (Professional Latin)
- U.S. National Dancesport Champions (Professional Smooth)
- U.S. National Dancesport Champions (Professional Rhythm)
- U.S. National Dancesport Champions (Professional 10-Dance)
- U.S. National Dancesport Champions (Professional 9-Dance)
- Dancesport World Champions (Professional Standard)
