= Nina Hunt =

British dancer

Nina Hunt (1932–1995) was a Manx Latin American dance coach and choreographer. She had a high reputation for coaching competitive Latin dancers.

== Biography ==
Hunt was born in 1932 on the Isle of Man. She came to England to become an actress and found work in a jewellery shop, where she met early Latin American dancer and innovator Dimitri Petrides. She persuaded him to teach her to dance and quickly became an adept dancer, but went into coaching instead of competing. The couple married, and had a son, Ian. Dimitri died whilst judging at Blackpool in 1985; Nina died from a stroke 10 years later.

Hunt trained many world champions and was especially well known for her choreography. Len Goodman, in his autobiography, likens a lesson with Hunt to being sent for a golf session with Tiger Woods. Among those she trained and choreographed were Bill and Bobbie Irvine, whom she coached in their quest for the World Professional Latin Championship, Donnie Burns – the most successful Latin dancer of all time - Sammy Stopford and Barbara McColl, Corky and Shirley Ballas, Alan and Hazel Fletcher, Walter and Marianne Kaiser and Ian Waite. Nina was once asked to choreograph Winter Olympic gold medal winners Torvill and Dean but turned them down. Nina first served on the Latin American Faculty Committee in 1964. An advocate of expanding the appeal of Latin American dancing, Hunt frequently demonstrated with Petrides on the BBC's 'Dancing Club' programme and appeared as a judge on Come Dancing.

An article written by one of Nina's former pupils, five times World Latin Champion Hazel Fletcher, began by saying

"Nina Hunt was indisputably the most successful Latin American competitive dance coach of all time. Her record...I am sure, will never be challenged again...Success in dancing is generally calculated by how many Championship titles a dancer has to his or her credit, if it were possible to count the number of couples that Nina trained solely to become top Champions, her record would be so staggering, it is almost unbelievable. She reigned supreme for over three decades."

"Nina's name became ‘the name’ synonymous with winning...She became a brilliant coach with a great eye for what was successful and how to achieve that in her couples. She was an excellent choreographer and had the ability to poach ‘moves’ from other forms of dance and indoctrinate them into the Latin dances. She was also a great mentor and motivator...Nina decided what competitions her couples should attend; she got involved in their grooming in every detail, their diet was discussed and she even versed her couples on how to walk onto the floor and where to dance. From her tiny studio in Balham she produced so many giants in the competitive world of dance." Hazel Fletcher.

== Coaching achievements ==
=== Professional ===
- Corky and Shirley Ballas.
- Bill and Bobbie Irvine MBE: 1960, 1961, 1966, 1968 (World), 1963 (9 Dance),
- Walter and Marianne Kaiser: 1965 (World)
- Sammy Stopford with Shirley Ballas and later with Barbara McColl
- Rudi and Mechtild Trautz: 1967, 1969–1971 (World)
- Wolfgang and Evelyn Opitz: 1972 (World)
- Hans-Peter and Ingeborg Fisher: 1973–1975 (World)
- Alan and Hazel Fletcher: 1977–1981 (World)
- Martin and Alison Lamb: 1993 (World 10 Dance)
- Donnie Burns MBE and Gaynor Fairweather MBE: 1984–1996, 1998 (World); 1990–1992, 1994, 1996 (International)

=== Amateur ===
- Karl and Ursula Breuer 1961.
- Dr Jurgen and Helga Bernhold 1962, 1966–1967.
- Robert Taylor and Anita Gent 1964.
- John and Betty Westley 1965.
- Peter and Hanni Neubeck 1968, 1970–1971.
- Raymond Root and Francis Spires 1969.
- Alan and Hazel Fletcher 1972–1973.
- Ian and Ruth Walker 1975.
- Jeffrey Dobinson and Debbie Lee London 1977.
- David Sycamore and Denise Weavers 1978–1979.
- Donnie Burns and Gaynor Fairweather 1981.
- Marcus Hilton and Karen Johnstone 1982–1983.
- Horst Beer and Andrea Lankenau 1985.
- Bryan Watson (dancer) and Claudia Leoni 1991.

== Awards ==
Over a successful career she won several awards including the Carl Alan Award 1968 and the Golden Dance-Shoe in 1986.

The World Dance Council named the 'Nina Hunt President's Award for contribution to Latin American Dance as an art-form' in her honour.
