= Tone Nyhagen =

Norwegian sport dancer

- Born: Tone Merete Nyhagen; 17 March 1963; Oslo, Norway
- Died: 28 December 2015 (aged 52)
- Occupation: Sport dancer

Tone Merete Nyhagen (17 March 1963 – 28 December 2015) was a Norwegian sport dancer.

== Career ==
Nyhagen danced with Knut Sæborg and the pair became World and European Champions in Latin American dance in both 1987 and in 1988. They finished third in the 1986 World Cup and second in the European Championships the same year. In 1986, Nyhagen and Sæborg became European champions in 10-dance.

== Award ==
After winning the World Cup in 1987, Nyhagen and Sæborg were awarded the gold medal. For this achievement the pair were awarded the Aftenposten Gold Medal.

The couple became professional in 1989.

Nyhagen worked as an international judge in dance.
