= New Zealand Open Dance Championship =

Championship

The annual New Zealand Open Dance Championship is run by the NZ Federation of Dance Teachers.

The competition has been held annually from 1950 in New Zealand.

This is a Freedom to Dance event.

== See also ==
- New Vogue (dance)
- Dancesport World Champions (Ten Dance)
- Dancesport World Champions (Professional Standard)
- Dancesport World Champions (Professional Latin)
