= U.S. National Dancesport Champions (Professional 10-Dance) =

The United States national professional ballroom dance champions are crowned at the United States Dance Championships (formerly USDSC, and USBC), as recognized by the National Dance Council of America (NDCA) and the World Dance & DanceSport Council (WD&DSC).

The 10-dance division consists of International-style standard waltz, tango, Viennese waltz, foxtrot, quickstep and Latin cha-cha-cha, samba, rumba, paso doble, and jive.

== U.S. National Champions ==
U.S. National Professional 10-Dance Ballroom Dance / Dancesport Champions
Years	Champions	Location	Notes
1966–1973	Larry Silvers & Betty Silvers	Bethesda, MD	
1974	Frank Regan & Victoria Regan	Washington, DC	
1975–1979	Al Franz & Beverly Donahue	Washington, DC	
1980	Victor Veyrasset & Debbie Avalos	California	
1981	Victor Veyrasset & Margaret Burns	California	
1982	Victor Veyrasset & Gitte Svendsen	California	
1983–1985	John Nyemchek & Cathi Nyemchek	Valley Cottage, NY	
1986–1990	Nicholas Cotton & Debbie Avalos	California	
1991–1992	Armando Martin & Laura Martin	West Palm Beach, FL	
1993–2002	Gary McDonald & Diana McDonald	Fairfield, NJ	
2003–2004	Igor Pilipenchuk & Polina Pilipenchuk	Baltimore, MD	
2005–2006	Eddie Stutts & Victoria Belova	Katy, TX	
2007–2011	Gherman Mustuc & Iveta Lukosiute	New York	
2012	Nikolai Pilipenchuk & Natalia Skorikova	Maryland	
2013–2016	Sergiy Samchynskyy & Yuliya Besarab	Georgia	
2017–2019	Jonas Kazlauskas & Kathleen Ilo	Indiana	
2020	Not held due to COVID-19 pandemic		
2021-2022	Jonas Kazlauskas & Kathleen Ilo	Indiana	
2023	Aleksandr Riabtsev & Mariia Oblakova	California	
2024-2025	Aleksei Minaev & Elena Minaeva	Ohio	
2026	Bohdan Dovhalov & Sonya Yudina	New Jersey	

== See also ==
- U.S. National Dancesport Champions (Professional Standard)
- U.S. National Dancesport Champions (Professional Latin)
- U.S. National Dancesport Champions (Professional Smooth)
- U.S. National Dancesport Champions (Professional Rhythm)
- U.S. National Dancesport Champions (Professional 9-Dance)
- Dancesport World Champions (Ten Dance)
- Dancesport World Champions (Professional Standard)
- Dancesport World Champions (Professional Latin)
