= U.S. National Dancesport Champions (Professional 9-Dance) =

The United States national professional ballroom dance champions are crowned at the United States Dance Championships (formerly USDSC, and USBC), as recognized by the National Dance Council of America (NDCA) and the World Dance & DanceSport Council (WD&DSC).

The 9-dance division consists of American-style smooth waltz, tango, foxtrot, Viennese waltz and rhythm cha cha, rumba, East Coast swing, bolero, and mambo.

== U.S. National Champions ==
U.S. National Professional 9-Dance Ballroom Dance / Dancesport Champions
1988–1990	David & Carrie Kloss	California
1991–1993	Randy & Lynn Ferguson	Texas
1994–1995	Jesse Smith & Lynda Price	Minnesota
1996	Jim Desmond & Mary Murphy	California
1997	Alec & Denise Lazo	Florida
1998–1999	Clive Phillips & Karen McDonald	(New York (state)) New York
2000	Jay Larson & Julie Jacobson	Minnesota
2001–2002	Gleb & Tatiana Makarov	(New York (state)) New York
2003–2005	Andrey & Anastasia Abrashin	(New York (state)) New York
2006	Ben Ermis & Shalene Archer-Ermis	Tennessee
2007	Gunnar & Daryll Sverrisson	Connecticut
2008	Joe & Leisa Howard	Virginia
2009	Ilya & Amanda Reyzin	Pennsylvania
2010–2014	Peter Perzhu & Alexandria Perzhu	Florida
2015	Jean Paul & Lana Rossi	Pennsylvania
2016–2017	Mykyta Serdyuk & Anna Krasnoshapka	Wisconsin
2018	Oleksiy Pigotskyy & Natalie Crandall	Arizona
2019	Sergiy Samchynskyy & Yuliya Besarab	North Carolina
2020	Not held due to COVID-19 pandemic	
2021–2022	Oleksiy Pigotskyy & Anastasiia Zhuchenko	Arizona
2023	Ivan Sovetov & Valeria Mkrtchian	(New York (state)) New York
2024-2025	Shane Jensen & Shannon Jensen	Florida
2026	Ivan Sovetov & Valeria Mkrtchian	(New York (state)) New York

== See also ==
- U.S. National Dancesport Champions (Professional Standard)
- U.S. National Dancesport Champions (Professional Latin)
- U.S. National Dancesport Champions (Professional Smooth)
- U.S. National Dancesport Champions (Professional Rhythm)
- U.S. National Dancesport Champions (Professional 10-Dance)
- Dancesport World Champions (smooth)
- Dancesport World Champions (rhythm)
