= U.S. National Dancesport Champions (Professional Latin) =

The United States national professional ballroom dance champions are crowned at the United States Dance Championships (formerly USBC and USDSC), as recognized by the National Dance Council of America (NDCA) and the World Dance & DanceSport Council (WD&DSC).

The International Latin division consists of International-style cha cha, samba, rumba, paso doble, and jive.

== U.S. National Champions ==
U.S. National Professional Latin Ballroom Dance / Dancesport Champions
1964-1969	Larry Silvers & Betty Silvers	Maryland
1971	Bob Medeiros & Sheryn Hawkins	Massachusetts
1972-1973	Vernon Brock & Beverly Donahue	New Jersey
1974	Frank Regan & Victoria Regan	Canada
1975-1978	Vernon Brock & Linda Dean	Texas
1979-1985	Ron Montez & Elizabeth Curtis	California
1986-1990	Corky Ballas & Shirley Ballas	Texas
1991-1992	Rick Valenzuela & Melissa Dexter	California
1993-1994	Bill Sparks & Shirley Johnson	Ohio
1995	Tony Meredith & Melanie LaPatin	(New York (state)) New York
1996	Rick Valenzuela & Melissa Dexter	California
1997	Gary McDonald & Diana McDonald	New Jersey
1998-1999	Bill Sparks & Kimberley Mitchell	Ohio
2000	Louis Van Amstel & Joanna Leunis	(New York (state)) New York
2001-2003	Slavik Kryklyvyy & Karina Smirnoff	(New York (state)) New York
2004-2006	Andrei Gavriline & Elena Kryuchkova	New Jersey
2007	Maxim Kozhevnikov & Yulia Zagoruychenko	(New York (state)) New York
2008-2016	Riccardo Cocchi & Yulia Zagoruychenko	(New York (state)) New York
2017	Andrei Kazlouski & Asta Sigvaldadottir	(New York (state)) New York
2018-2019	Riccardo Cocchi & Yulia Zagoruychenko	(New York (state)) New York
2020	Not held due to Covid-19 pandemic	
2021-2023	Troels Bager & Ina Jeliazkova	(New York (state)) New York
2024-2026	Andrei Kazlouski & Nino Dzneladze	Pennsylvania

== See also ==
- U.S. National Dancesport Champions (Professional Standard)
- U.S. National Dancesport Champions (Professional Smooth)
- U.S. National Dancesport Champions (Professional Rhythm)
- U.S. National Dancesport Champions (Professional 10-Dance)
- U.S. National Dancesport Champions (Professional 9-Dance)
- Dancesport World Champions (Latin)
