= Anna Demidova (dancer) =

Russian-born ballroom dancer

- Анна Демидова
- Born: 23 April 1988 (age 38); Moscow, Russian SFSR, Soviet Union
- Occupation: ballroom dancer
- Known for: WDC World Professional Ballroom champion (2022, 2023); U.S. National Professional Ballroom champion (2022, 2023); British Open Professional Ballroom champion (2022, 2023); UK Champion; Two-time International Professional Ballroom Champion; Television Dance Star
- Partners: Andrei Begunov, Igor Mikushov, Valerio Colantoni
- Relatives: Katusha Demidova (sister)

Anna Demidova (Russian: Анна Демидова; born April 23, 1988) is a Russian-American professional ballroom dancer. She is two-time WDC World Professional Ballroom champion (2022, 2023), two-time British Open Professional Ballroom champion (Blackpool Dance Festival in Brackets, 2022, 2023), two-time United States National Professional Ballroom champion (2022, 2023), two-time International Professional Ballroom Champion and UK Champion. She won the professional dancer competition of Dancing with the Stars, Season 8, which earned her a place as a professional dancer in Season 9 and has been featured in several international publications.

== Early life ==
Demidova was born in Moscow, Russian SFSR, Soviet Union. She started dancing when she was six years old in an after-school program at the local community center, following in the footsteps of her older sister, world champion Katusha Demidova. At the age of fifteen, Demidova won the British Open Junior Ballroom Championship and the Ireland Open Championship.

== Career ==
After finishing high school in Moscow, Demidova moved to New York to live with her sister and pursue her dancing career. She began dancing with Andrei Begunov, and after becoming the United States Youth Champions in 2005 and 2006, they represented the U.S. at the World Championships where they made the finals. They also placed 1st at the Ohio Star Ball, Kings Ball, Tri-State Challenge, BYU Championship, and many other competitions in the youth category.

After her partnership with Andrey ended, Demidova started dancing with Igor Mikushov. With whom they became 2008 United States National Amateur Ballroom Champions and United States National Amateur 10 dance runner up. They were also Blackpool Dance Festival Under 21 Ballroom finalists, United Kingdom and International Championships Grand Finalists.

In 2009 Demidova won the televised "professional dancer competition" on season 8 of ABC Dancing with the Stars, which earned her a spot as a professional dancer on Season 9. She was partnered with former NFL player Michael Irvin, and they remained in the competition for seven weeks.

Demidova has since returned to competition, reuniting with Andrei Begunov, premiering at the Manhattan Dancesport Championships, debuting as professionals, placing second in Rising Star International Standard. In 2011, she and Begunov went on to win the United States National Professional Rising Star Ballroom Championship title and made the final of the Open Professional United States National Ballroom Championships.

In 2022 Anna Demidova started dancing with Valerio Colantoni. Together they have won consecutive United States National Professional Ballroom titles in 2022 and 2023, back-to-back WDC World Professional International Ballroom Titles in 2022 and 2023 (representing the United States), British Open (Blackpool Dance Festival) Professional Ballroom 2022 and 2023, International Professional Ballroom Dance Festival 2022 and 2023 and United Kingdom Professional Ballroom in 2023. After winning all the major championships multiple times together they announced their retirement in 2024 at the Blackpool Dance Festival after winning the team match for Team USA.

== Personal life ==
Since retiring from top-level competition, Demidova has been based in New Jersey, coaching and judging.

== Competitive highlights ==
Year	Competition	Category / Result	Partner	Notes / References
2005	IDSF World Youth Standard Championship	8th place	Andrei Begunov	
2008	U.S. National Amateur Ballroom Championship	Champion	Igor Mikushov	
2009	Dancing with the Stars (Season 8)	Winner, Professional Dancer Competition	—	
2011	U.S. National Professional Rising Star Ballroom Championship	Champion	Andrey Begunov	
2022	U.S. National Professional Ballroom Championship	Champion	Valerio Colantoni	
2022	WDC World Professional Ballroom Championship	Champion	Valerio Colantoni	
2022	United Kingdom Open Professional Ballroom Championship	Champion	Valerio Colantoni	
2022	British Open Professional Ballroom Championship	Champion	Valerio Colantoni	
2022	Manhattan Dance Championships	Open Professional Ballroom – Champion	Valerio Colantoni	
2023	U.S. National Professional Ballroom Championship	Champion	Valerio Colantoni	
2023	WDC World Professional Ballroom Championship	Champion	Valerio Colantoni	
2023	British Open Professional Ballroom Championship	Champion	Valerio Colantoni	
2023	United Kingdom Open Professional Ballroom Championship	Champion	Valerio Colantoni	
2023	British Open Professional Ballroom Championship	Champion	Valerio Colantoni	
2023	Emerald Ball	Professional Ballroom Champion	Valerio Colantoni	
2023	North American Imperial Star Ball	Open Professional Ballroom – Champion	Valerio Colantoni	
