= Sergei Chislov =

Soviet dancer (born 1960)

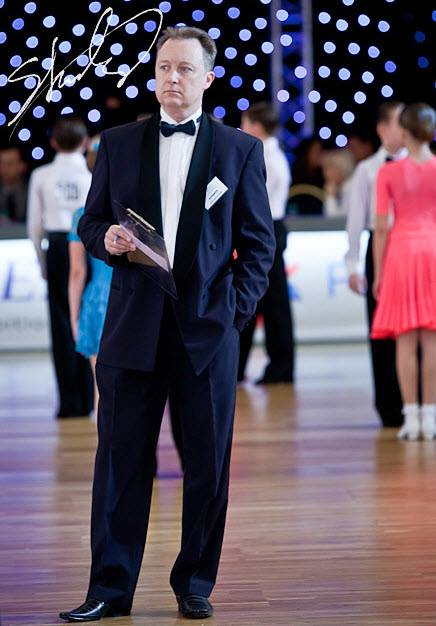
- Sergei Chislov judging at WDC in Moscow, 2012
- Born: November 4, 1960 (age 65)
- Occupations: Dance teacher, Dancesport coach, Dance Adjudicator

Sergei Chislov (alternative spelling: Sergey Chislov, Russian: Сергей Евгеньевич Числов), born November 4, 1960, in Moscow, USSR, is a 3-time USSR Professional 10-Dance champion, certified International Dance Adjudicator of World Dance Council (WDC), ballroom dance coach, USSR Master of Sport in ballroom dancing, choreographer, and a film actor. As of 2013, he lives and works in Miami, FL, United States.

== Biography ==
Sergei Chislov was born to a family of engineers in Moscow, USSR. Sergei started dancing at the age of 17 when he started learning to waltz for the graduation party at the secondary school. After graduation Sergei started his dancing education at the Sports and Dance Center '726' in 1978. He continued training at this club till 1988. During that period Sergei became 3-time USSR Professional 10-Dance champion and a multiple winner of national and international ballroom dancesport competitions.

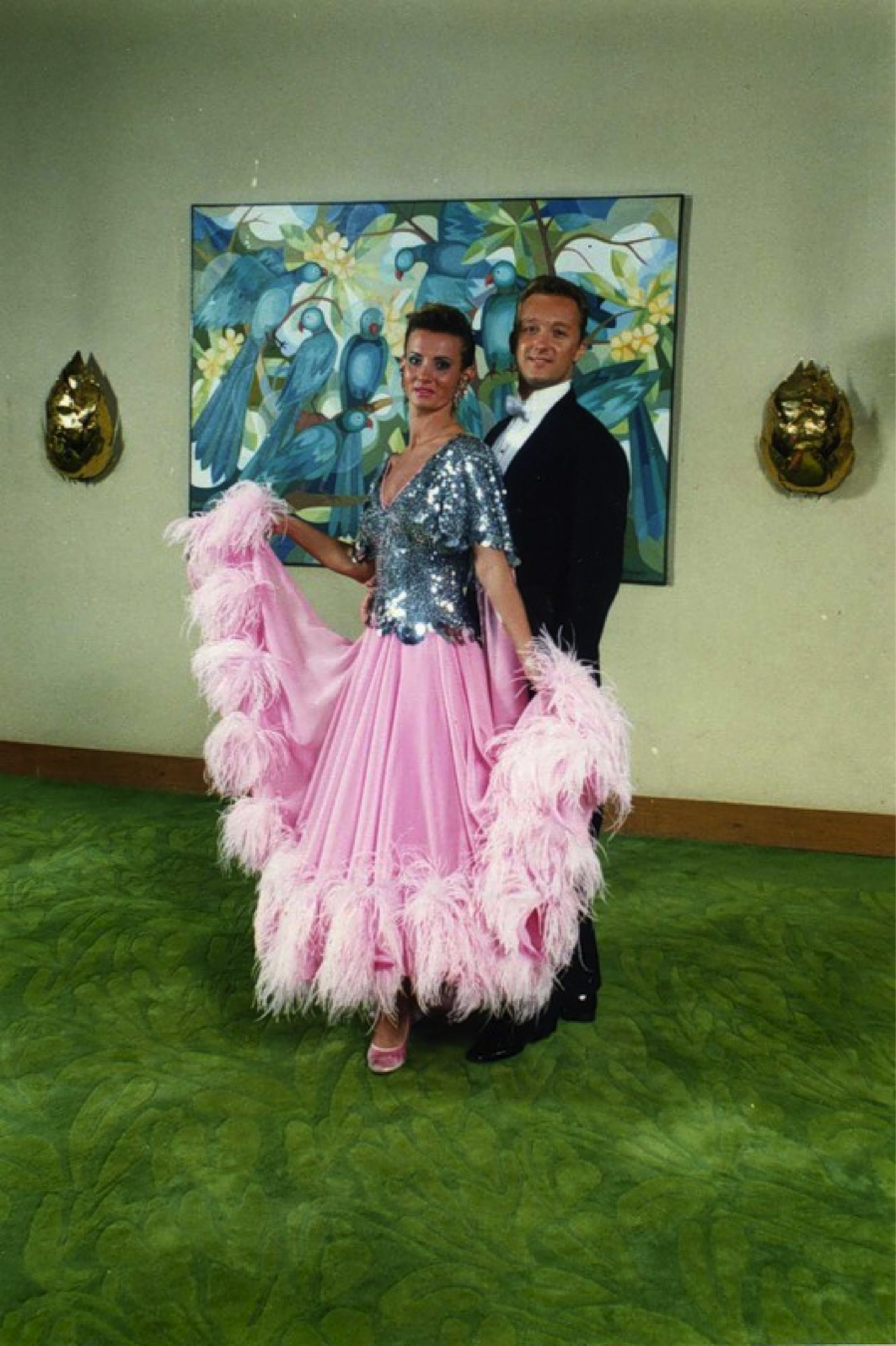
Sergei Chislov and his wife and partner Elena, 1993

List of international dance competitions and festivals of ballroom dancing where Sergei Chislov represented the USSR:

- Usti nad Labem, Czechoslovakia (former Czech Republic), 1982-1986
- Festival in Berlin, International Ballroom Dance Competition, Berlin, Leipzig, Germany – 1982-1987
- Savaria Szombathely, International Ballroom Dance Competition, Hungary, 1983-1988
- International Ballroom Dance Competition, Vilnius, Latvia, 1986
- Leipziger Messe, International Ballroom Dance Competition, Leipzig, GDR, 1987
- Usti nad Labem, Czechoslovakia, 1985)
- Open International Dance Championship, Germany, 1989

Sergei started his training career in 1980 while still taking part in dance competitions. In 1989 he announced his retirement from competitions and founded his own dance instruction club 'Dzhem.' He coached a number of young dancers, some of them became winners of European and world championships. Along with his training career Sergei Chislov started his judging career, and today he is a certified International Dance Adjudicator of World Dance Council. Today Sergei works as a trainer at VK Dance Center in Miami, Fl and pursues his own project New Dance Dimension which is claimed to be "...an idea brought to life by four famous choreographers and multiple-time winners of world championships." Sergei has recently made his acting debut in Russian movie "Snezhnaya Koroleva" directed by Natalia Bondarchuk.

== Notable students ==
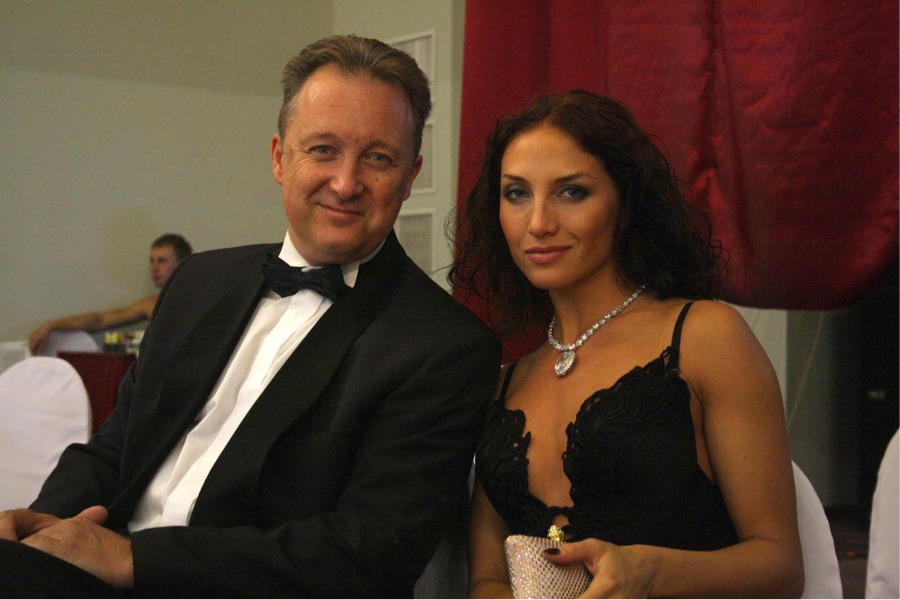
Sergei Chislov and his student Anna Melnikova

Ilya Svintsov and Lubov Bondareva

- Bronze medalist of the World Latin Dance Championship 2008 (IPDSC)-International Professional Dance Sport Council – Italy, Countries: (Italy, Israel, England, Spain, Russia, Norway, Poland, Georgia, Germany, Lithuania)
- Second place at the European Professional Dance Championship, version IPDSC-International Professional Dance Sport Council-2008, total in the competition participated couples from more than 10 countries.(Italy, England, Spain, Germany, Russia, Ukraine, Latvia, Australia, Poland, France, Finland)
- Silver winners of the World Latin Dance 2008 in Taipei. Representatives from 13 countries participated in the competition organized by Royce and Mary Yeh.

Alexandr Poliakov

- Vice-Champion in Latin American Dancing
- World Dance Cup Finalist
- World and European vice-champion among the Professionals Latin American Danceshow
- A multiple winner of Dance International Championships

Anna Melnikova

- World Champion in professional Latin American Dances
- Winner WDC Professional World South American Showdance, 2011
- Silver medalist USA Open Dance Championships, Winner Blackpool Dance Festival, United Kingdom
- Winner IDSF European Latin Championship-Germany, Winner, Copenhagen
- Open International Dance Competition-Denmark, Winner Italian Amateur Championships
- Winner UK Open Dance Championships-England, Winner Tattersall's Australian Open-Melbourne
- Winner Monaco Dancesport Festival
- Winner IDSF Grand Slam Finals-Japan
- Winner International Championships-England, Winner Imperial-England
