= U.S. National Dancesport Champions (Professional Smooth) =

The United States national professional ballroom dance champions are crowned at the United States Dance Championships (formerly United States DanceSport Championships, USDSC, and United States Ballroom Championships, USBC), as recognized by the National Dance Council of America (NDCA) and the World Dance & DanceSport Council (WD&DSC).

The American Smooth division consists of American-style waltz, tango, foxtrot, and Viennese waltz.

== U.S. National Champions ==
U.S. National Professional Smooth Ballroom Dance / Dancesport Champions
1984	Charles & Jean Penatello	New Jersey
1985	Joe Lozano & Jan Mattingly	Texas
1986	Joe Lozano & Jan Mattingly	Texas
1987	Joe Lozano & Jan Mattingly	Texas
1988	Rosendo & Terri Fumero	Texas
1989	Rosendo & Terri Fumero	Texas
1990	Rosendo & Terri Fumero	Texas
1991	David & Carrie Kloss	California
1992	David & Carrie Kloss	California
1993	Jim & Jenell Maranto	Arizona
1994	Jim & Jenell Maranto	Arizona
1995	David Hamilton & Teresa Shiry	California
1996	Edward Simon & Michelle Officer	(New York (state)) New York
1997	David Hamilton & Olga Foraponova	California
1998	David Hamilton & Olga Foraponova	California
1999	Michael Mead & Toni Redpath	California
2000	Michael Mead & Toni Redpath	California
2001	Michael Mead & Toni Redpath	California
2002	Michael Mead & Toni Redpath	California
2003	Nicholas Kosovich & Lena Kosovich	(New York (state)) New York
2004	Nicholas Kosovich & Lena Kosovich	(New York (state)) New York
2005	Ben Ermis & Shalene Archer-Ermis	Tennessee
2006	Ben Ermis & Shalene Archer-Ermis	Tennessee
2007	Tomas Mielnicki & JT Thomas	(New York (state)) New York
2008	Jonathan Roberts & Valentina Kostenko	California
2009	Tomas Mielnicki & JT Thomas	(New York (state)) New York
2010	Slawek Sochacki & Marzena Stachura	California
2011	Slawek Sochacki & Marzena Stachura	California
2012	Slawek Sochacki & Marzena Stachura	California
2013	Slawek Sochacki & Marzena Stachura	California
2014	Peter Perzhu & Alexandra Perzhu	Florida
2015	Peter Perzhu & Alexandra Perzhu	Florida
2016	Nick Cheremukhin & Viktorija	California
2017	Nick Cheremukhin & Viktorija	California
2018	Nick Cheremukhin & Viktorija	California
2019	Nick Cheremukhin & Viktorija	California
2020	Not held due to Covid-19 pandemic	
2021	Roman Malkhasyan & Galina Detkina	Florida
2022	Roman Malkhasyan & Galina Detkina	Florida
2023	Roman Malkhasyan & Galina Detkina	Florida
2024	Roman Malkhasyan & Galina Detkina	Florida
2025	Roman Malkhasyan & Galina Detkina	Florida
2026	Travis Tuft & Jaimee Tuft	New Jersey

== See also ==
- U.S. National Dancesport Champions (Professional Standard)
- U.S. National Dancesport Champions (Professional Latin)
- U.S. National Dancesport Champions (Professional Rhythm)
- U.S. National Dancesport Champions (Professional 10-Dance)
- U.S. National Dancesport Champions (Professional 9-Dance)
- Dancesport World Champions (smooth)
