= Monsieur Pierre =

Monsieur Pierre was the professional name of Pierre Jean Philippe Zurcher-Margolle (born c. 1890, Toulon, France – died 1963, London). He was a professional dancer and dance teacher, largely responsible for introducing the Latin American dances to England, and for codifying them, and laying the groundwork for their use in competitions and in social dance. The system he and his colleagues developed became the basis for all Latin and American competitions held under the World Dance Council (WDC).

== Early life ==
As a young man, Pierre's engineering studies at Zurich University were abruptly halted when he was struck in the eye by a tennis ball. This accident resulted in the loss of sight in that eye. After this accident he went to live in Paris where his spare time was spent in the night clubs where Cuban and other Latin immigrants enjoyed their music and dances. He next worked in the French consular service in Liverpool, but was forced to resign when the eye strain began to affect the sighted eye. He moved to London, where he enjoyed ice skating and dancing. After World War I ended in 1918 he started on a career as a professional ballroom dancer. Although he spent the rest of his life resident in London, Pierre remained a French citizen for his entire life.

== Latin dance in England ==
The rhythms which make Latin American dance popular were brought to Britain between the two World Wars. Pierre was already an accomplished dancer and teacher in the English ballroom style. In Latin dances, his repertoire first consisted of the Argentine tango, the Paso doble and the Samba.

"The tango was always his speciality in demonstrations and as a result many teachers were attracted to it and first learnt it from him."
"Pierre had been a celebrated exponent and teacher of tango, dancing first with Countess Gioia, then Mme Bayo, followed by Meredyth Owen. He had established a reputation as the leading specialist for all Latin dances."

For a number of years Pierre's studio was in or near Regent Street. Later, Doris Lavelle went to him to learn the tango. He quickly realised her potential and after training she became his next dance partner. They demonstrated as often as three nights a week at London restaurants, ballrooms and night clubs, of which there were many at that time.

By the 1930s Pierre had moved more towards the Latin American dances, and in 1934 his full-page trade adverts featured the rumba. The studio stayed open all through World War II, and was a popular meeting place for the Free French fighters on leave in London.

After the war, the studio was re-established at 15, Greek Street, Soho. A small studio on the top floor with a good maple floor, and a sound system installed by James Arnell, who later became International Latin American dance champion.

=== The rumba arrives in London ===
The ballroom rumba is so called despite the music, and the dance, being of a different genre from the authentic Cuban rumba. The rumba danced in America and Europe was, and is, a music of the son type: 'rumba' was a marketing term to cover several terms used by Cubans; salsa is a comparable case today.

In 1932, Monsieur and Madame Chapoul, well known French demonstrators, gave an exhibition of rumba at the Café de Paris in London, followed by Don Azpiazú and his band, the very group who had had such a hit with their recording of Peanut Vendor. Pierre was present and later went to the Cabine Cubaine club in Paris to take a look at the dancers.

Originally, Pierre had visited Paris to find out how their dancers and teachers dealt with the rumba. He discovered they used a system devised in the USA, the square rumba, so called after its basic figure. By 1934 he was featuring the rumba in his demonstrations, his adverts, his classes and in magazine articles.

Following the war, in 1947, Pierre visited Cuba, where he discovered to his surprise that the Cubans danced it differently. When he danced with Suzy of Pepe and Suzy Rivera, the then Cuban champions, according to Lavelle's diary, the first thing she said was "you are out of time". So he had a lesson every day and danced at the acadamias [sic] every night. After this period of study he returned to London determined to replace the square rumba with the Cuban rumba, "el sistema cubano".

To this end, Pierre wrote the first account of his ideas on the rumba as a dance. In this short book, Pierre gives the square rumba at the start of the book, and the first published account of the Cuban 'rumba' in Chapter 7. This latter was substantially the same as in the finally agreed syllabus of 1955.

One of the characteristics of Cuban dance to the son, and other similar rhythms, was, and still is, their method of taking three steps to four beats of music (whether 2/4 or 4/4). Whereas the Square rumba had been danced on beat 1, the Cuban rumba figure starts on beat 2, counting (pause) 2, 3, 4-1 as (pause) quick, quick, slow with the hip settling over the standing foot on 4-1. All social dances in Cuba involve a hip-sway over the standing leg and, though this is scarcely noticeable in fast salsa, it is more pronounced in the slow ballroom rumba.

The Latin and American section of the Imperial Society of Teachers of Dancing (ISTD) Ballroom Branch was formed in 1947 by Monsieur Pierre as Chairman, his partner Doris Lavelle, and their colleague, Doris Nichols. They were the first examiners, soon joined by Gwenethe Walshe and Dimitri Petrides. This small band of specialists worked to establish an examination system and syllabus for both amateur and professional dancers. Walter Laird and Peggy Spencer, were other important members, among others, added a few years later. The syllabus which was finally agreed in 1955 has been the foundation of teaching and competition in the Latin American dances ever since. This work naturally included the samba, paso doble and jive as well, but it was the composition of the rumba which was critical. After further visits to Cuba in the early 1950s, when Doris Lavelle and James Arnell accompanied Pierre, the cha cha cha was added to make the five Latin American dances that are still the basis of teaching and competition today in the international dance community.

On Monsieur Pierre's death in 1963, his colleague Doris Nichols commented: "The Latin American dancing world was so influenced, fostered and built up by him that the names of 'Pierre' and 'Latin American' became virtually synonymous."

Monsieur Pierre was a Fellow, Examiner and committee member of the Imperial Society of Teachers of Dancing (ISTD) and a Member of the Official Board of Ballroom Dancing (OBBD).

== Also ==
- Music of Cuba
