= Riccardo Cocchi =

Italian-American dancer (born 1977)

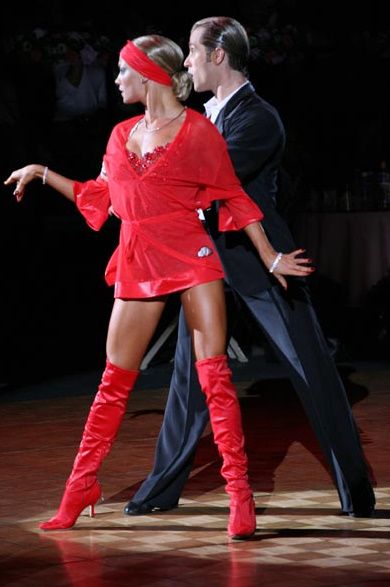
Riccardo Cocchi & Yulia Zagoruychenko

Riccardo Cocchi (born 7 December 1977, Terni, Italy) is a 10-time undefeated Latin Dance Champion, with his partner, Yulia Zagoruychenko. Currently, he resides in and represents the United States of America. When not busy competing, Riccardo is available for coaching.

== History ==
Riccardo began his dancing career at the age of 6 at his parents’ dance studio. His first partner was Barbara Mancuso. At first, Riccardo appreciated International Ballroom (or Standard) more than Latin. Later, he competed for many years in amateur divisions with different partners. When Riccardo started dancing with Joanne Wilkinson, from Australia, in 1998, he switched over to Latin completely. Riccardo and Joanne were two-time World Amateur Latin Champions, ten-time Italian Amateur Champions, Professional Italian Latin Champions, and Professional Grand Finalists at the UK, British and World Championships. He continued dancing with her for ten years until 2007, when the partnership split. Soon afterwards, Riccardo had the opportunity to dance with Yulia Zagoruychenko. Cocchi and Zagoruychenko won their first World Latin Dance Championship in 2010 and earned their second title in 2011. They are ranked #1 in the world for Professional Latin. They recently won their 5th consecutive National Professional Latin Champions title at the US Open Dance Competition. Apart from active participation in competitions, Riccardo and Yulia take part in shows all over the world. From April 2012, they have been performing in «Dance Legends» in New-York. These days, they continue performing as guests at events like Shining Star Cup 2023.

== Famous coaches ==
- Barbara McColl
- Sammy Stopford
- Espen Salberg
- Hans Galke
- Shirley Ballas
- Donnie Burns

== Latest titles ==
- 2005 idsf world amateur Latin champion
- 2010-2019 World Professional Latin Champion
- 2009 World Professional Showdance Champion
- 2008-2019 U.S. National Professional Latin Champion
- 2016-2019 British Open Professional Latin American Dance Champion (Blackpool Dance Festival)
- 2012, 2015-2019 Winner of the Elsa Wells International Dance Championships
- 2008-2014 U.S. Open Champion
- 2008–2011, 2013-2015 DWC Disney Champion (Paris, France)
- 2008-2019 Dutch Open Champion
- 2010-2016 Asian Open Champion (Tokyo, Japan)
- 2013, 2016 Asian Open Champion (Korea and China)
- 2010–2014, 2016 Asian Open Champion (Taiwan)
- 2010-2012 Asian Open Champion (Indonesia)
- 2010-2014 Asian Open Champion (Macao)
- 2010-2012 Philippine Star Ball Champion
- 2009, 2012, 2013 German Open Champion
- 2012, 2016 Asian Pacific Champion
