= Paramount Ballroom =

Paramount Ballroom may refer to:

- The Paramount Ballroom, Alec Lazo's ballroom in West Palm Beach, Florida, U.S.
- Paramount (Shanghai)
