= Jonathan Wilkins =

English ballroom dancer and dance teacher

Jonathan Wilkins is an English ballroom dancer and dance teacher, born in London. He holds many titles in Professional Ballroom Dancing, including being ten times Professional Ballroom Champion, 1997–2007 (in a partnership with Katusha Demidova, which lasted eleven years and brought considerable success). In 2004, they won the World Classic Showdance Championship, which is one of the subsidiary World Dance Council Dance Sport events. Their final result was to win the WDC Open Professional Ballroom title at the USA Open in Orlando, Florida 2007.

From November 2007, Wilkins danced with Hazel Newberry. Together they became European Profession Ballroom Champions (2009) and British Professional Ballroom Champions (2009). Their best results were first in the WDC Professional Ballroom, Moscow 2009, and second in the Professional World Ballroom Dance Championship in Tokyo 2009. After this championship the two partners retired from competitive dancing. Both are currently judges for ballroom dancing championships.

In 2010, Jonathan married Anastasia Kazmina, a Canadian Professional Ballroom Vice-Champion who currently teaches students in the US and England.
