= Lithuanian Sports Dance Federation =

- Lietuvos Sportinių Šokių Federacija
- Abbreviation: LSŠF
- Formation: February 18, 1989; 37 years ago
- Type: Non-governmental organization
- Purpose: Dance
- Headquarters: Vilnius, Lithuania
- Region served: Lithuania
- Official language: Lithuanian
- President: Gintaras Skorupskas
- Vice President for Sports Affairs: Virginijus Visockas
- Vice President for the Strategic Activities of the Federation: Paulius Sangavičius
- Vice President for Common Affairs: Dalia Vaikšnorienė
- Website: https://www.dancesport.lt/

The Lithuanian Sports Dance Federation (Lithuanian: Lietuvos sportinių šokių federacija, LSŠF) is the national governing body for competitive dance in Lithuania. Founded in 1989, its headquarters are located in Vilnius, Lithuania. The Federation is responsible for organizing sports dance competitions, promoting the development of dance sports, and overseeing training and qualification standards for dancers in the country.

The current president of the Lithuanian Sports Dance Federation is Gintaras Skorupskas.

LSŠF is a member of various international sports dance organizations, including the World Dance Council (WDC), which helps facilitate global competitions and the promotion of dance sports on an international scale.

== History ==
The first ball dance competition in Lithuania was held in 1935 at the Vincentas Mintaučkis Dance School in Kaunas. Another contest was organized there in 1939, after which Lithuanian representatives participated in the European Championship.

The Second World War put an end to the development of ball dancing. In 1956, dance enthusiasts in Lithuania again began to be interested in dancing.

On 18 February 1989, the Lithuanian Sports Dance Federation was established. In 1991, the organization became a member of the International Federation of Sports Dances.

== Events ==
- Yearly Competitions
- Youth and Junior Championships
- International Dance Sport Conferences
- International Dance Sport Competitions in Lithuania
- Lithuanian Cup Series
