= Yulia Zagoruychenko =

Russian dancer (born 1981)

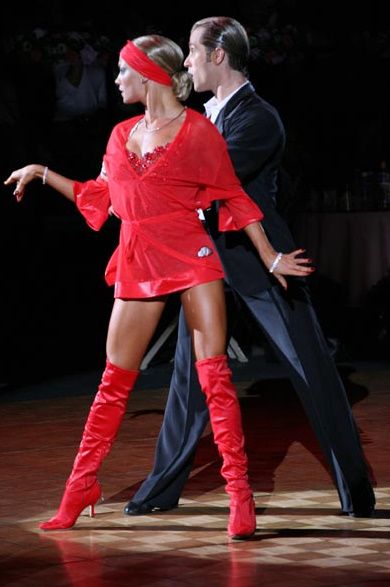
- Yulia Zagoruychenko & Riccardo Cocchi
- Born: September 11, 1981 (age 43); Belgorod, Russia
- Occupation: Professional Latin dancer

Yulia Zagoruychenko (born September 11, 1981) is a ten-time Latin Dance Champion and the current World Latin Dance Champion with her partner/husband, Riccardo Cocchi.

Born on September 11, 1981, in Belgorod, Russia, Zagoruychenko began Russian Folklore ensemble dancing at the age of four. As a child, she enjoyed watching and copying dancers on TV, so her mother agreed to enroll her in dance classes. Her training began with Russian folk dancing, and after three years, she moved into ballroom dancing. At the age of 11, Zagoruychenko began teaching other children to earn money for her family. In 1993, at the age of 12, she earned her first major title when she became the Russian Junior National Champion. For financial reasons, she was not able to afford to dance both Ballroom and Latin and hence, at the age of 16, she chose to pursue Latin. At the age of 21, she decided to move to America and partnered with Maxim Kozhevnikov. Together they became the US National Professional Champions. In the fall of 2007, she began dancing with Riccardo Cocchi.

Zagoruychenko and Cocchi won their first World Latin Dance Championship in 2010 and earned their eighth title in 2017. They are ranked as #1 in the world of Professional Latin. They recently won their 5th consecutive US National Professional Latin Champions title at the US Open Dance Competition. In October 2019, they announced their retirement, with their last international competition being the World Professional Latin Champions in Miami. The pair continues to publish instructional dance content on the app Koros. They still perform as guests at events like Shining Star Cup 2023.

Yulia cites other forms of dance besides Latin, as well as from other musicians, including Cyd Charisse, Fred Astaire, Diana Vishneva, Gaynor Fairweather, and Donnie Burns. She is also inspired by musicians Jose Feliciano, Tina Turner, Andrea Bocelli, Christina Aguilera, and the dance companies Pilobolus and Alvin Ailey.

== Personal life ==
In 2017, after ten years of professional collaboration, Zagoruychenko and Cocchi were married. They have one son together.

Zagoruychenko was named an "American By Choice" in 2011, an honor bestowed by the Carnegie Corporation to "exceptional U.S. immigrants".

== Titles ==
- 2010-2019: World Professional Latin Champions
- 2009: World Professional Showdance Champions
- 2008-2016 and 2018: U.S. National Professional Latin Champions
- 2012, 2015-2017: Winners of the International Championships England
- 2008-2014: U.S. Open Champions
- 2016-2018: Blackpool Dance Festival Champions, England
- 2016-2017: Blackpool Dance Festival Champions, China
- 2016-2018: UK Championship Champions, England
- 2008-2011, 2013-2017: WDC Fred Astaire Cup Competition (Disneyland, Paris)
- 2008-2017: Dutch Open Champions, Assen
- 2010-2018: Asian Open Champions (Tokyo, Japan)
- 2013, 2016: Asian Open Champions (Korea and China)
- 2010-2014, 2016-2018: Asian Open Champions (Taiwan)
- 2010-2012: Asian Open Champions (Indonesia)
- 2010-2014, 2015-2017: Asian Open Champions (Macao)
- 2010-2012: Philippine Star Ball Champions
- 2009, 2012, 2013: German Open Champions
- 2012, 2016: Asian Pacific Champions
