= Dancesport World Champions (smooth) =

World Championships have been held in the Smooth section of ballroom dancing since they were organised by the National Dance Council of America in 2005.

American Smooth dancing covers the dances waltz, tango, foxtrot, and Viennese waltz.

== World Champions ==
World Professional Smooth Ballroom Dance / Dancesport Champions
2005	Nicholas Kosovich & Lena Kosovich	(United States) U.S.A.
2006	Ben Ermis & Shalene Archer-Ermis	(United States) U.S.A.
2007	Tomas Mielnicki & Jennifer Damalas	(United States) U.S.A.
2008	Jonathan Roberts & Valentina Kostenko	(United States) U.S.A.
2009	Tomas Mielnicki & Jennifer Damalas	(United States) U.S.A.
2010-2013	Slawek Sochacki & Marzena Stachura	(United States) U.S.A.
2014-2015	Peter Perzhu & Alexandra Perzhu	(United States) U.S.A.
2016-2019	Nick Cheremukhin & Viktorija Barasihina	(United States) U.S.A.
2020	Not held due to Covid-19 Pandemic	
2021-2025	Roman Malkhasyan & Galina Detkina	(United States) U.S.A.
2026	Travis Tuft & Jaimee Tuft	(United States) U.S.A.

== See also ==
- Standard World Champions
- Latin World Champions
- Rhythm World Champions
- U.S. National Dancesport Champions (Professional Smooth)
- U.S. National Dancesport Champions (Professional 9-Dance)
