= Gwenethe Walshe =

British Latin and ballroom dancer

Gwenethe Walshe (5 February 1908 – 22 January 2006) was a leading British Latin and ballroom dancer. Born in Wanganui, New Zealand, she lived most of her life in England and moved to Australia after her retirement. She arrived in England in 1936, and by 1938 she had founded a dance school bearing her name in London's West End, which (as of 2006) is still operating as the Central London Dance. During World War II she worked by day as a WVS nurse and by night continued to run classes, even during air raids. Gwenethe simply turned up the music and the dancing continued!

Taught latin dance by the leading experts of the day, Monsieur Pierre (Pierre Zurcher-Margolle) and Doris Lavelle, Gwenethe and her partner Dimitri Petrides won the first Latin dance competitions. Gwenethe went on to become a key member of the Imperial Society of Teachers of Dancing. In particular, she helped to develop the technique of latin dancing and the framework for its teaching and competition assessment.

"The Latin American Faculty was formed in 1946 by Monsieur Pierre, his partner Doris Lavelle, and colleague, Doris Nichols. They were later joined by Gwenethe Walshe and Dimitri Petrides. This small band of dedicated specialists worked vigorously to establish an examination system of set syllabus for both amateur and professional dancers."

== Career highlights ==
- Member of the Imperial Society of Teachers of Dancing (ISTD) Grand Council and the ISTD Latin American Faculty Committee
- Gwenethe Walshe School of Dancing
- Central London Dance Studio originally named Gweneth Walshe Dance Studio
- Dance advisor for the 1992 British film L'Amant '
- Judged the International Championships at the Royal Albert Hall in London, for many years
- Taught ballroom dancing teachers
- Through television, taught the general public ballroom dancing
- 1999, received a special award from the Imperial Society of Teachers of Dancing for her services over her career
- Served as a WVS nurse by day and a dance instructor by night.
