= Edward Simon (choreographer) =

Ballroom dance champion and choreographer

- Born: Cedar Rapids, Iowa, U.S.
- Occupation: Choreographer

Edward Simon is a professional ballroom dance champion and choreographer.

== Biography ==
Edward, or "Eddie", Simon is a former United States ballroom champion, world showdance and U.S. theatrical finalist.

Simon received a North American Dance Award for the "Favorite Couple of the Year".

Simon is a co-owner of Dance New York, Former owner of New York Dance Festival and the Empire State Dance Sport Championships. He also returns to his hometown of Cedar Rapids, Iowa, several times a year to coach and offer workshops at Dance New York's Iowa studio, as well as officiate at the annual Iowa Dancesport Challenge.

== TV and Film ==
Simon has been behind the scenes as well as made appearances in various films and TV shows, most notably, performances on the PBS series Championship Ballroom Dancing and as a guest choreographer on the FOX dance competition-reality show So You Think You Can Dance.

== Achievements ==
- 1996 - U.S. National Professional Ballroom Champion with Michelle Officer
- 1999 - North American Dance Award for “Favorite Couple of the Year”
- 2003 - North American Dance Award Nominee for “Choreographer of the Year”
- 2004 - North American Dance Award Nominee for “Coach of the Year”

== See also ==
- U.S. National Dancesport Champions (Professional Smooth)
- So You Think You Can Dance (Season 4)
- America's Ballroom Challenge
