= Barbara McColl =

Scottish ballroom dancer

Barbara Joanne McColl Stopford BEM (née McColl) is a Scottish professional ballroom dancer, teacher, and adjudicator. She specializes in International Latin. With Sammy Stopford, she won in the professional Latin category four times at the Blackpool Dance Festival and three times at the UK Open. She is the Organizer of The World Championship WDC AL.

== Career ==
Between 2 January 1987, when they placed 2nd at the ICBD World Professional Latin Championships in Miami, and 26 May 1995, when they placed 2nd at Blackpool, McColl and Stopford competed in multiple British and international dance championships in the professional Latin category. They placed first at Blackpool four times, in 1989, 1991, 1992, and 1994, and at the UK Open three times, in 1991, 1992, and 1994, and also won the ICBD European Professional Latin Championships in 1991.

Since retiring from competition, McColl has been co-organiser with Stopford and Donnie Burns of the Open World Championship in Paris. She and Stopford co-presented lectures at the Blackpool Congress that have been issued as a set by the British Dance Council.

McColl was awarded the British Empire Medal (BEM) in the 2022 Birthday Honours for services to dance, particularly during COVID-19.
