= Alec Lazo =

American dancer

- Born: Alejandro Lazo; February 23; Havana, Cuba
- Occupations: Professional Dancer; Instructor; Choreographer
- Height: 5 ft 11 in (180 cm)
- Website: www.paramountballroom.com

Alejandro Lazo (born February 23) is a Cuban-American professional dancer, instructor, and choreographer based in Palm Beach, Florida. Lazo was the US International Rising Star Latin Champion in 1990 and went on through over twenty years of successful DanceSport competition. This cumulated in 1999 when he became the U.S. Nine-Dance Champion. He has appeared numerous times in television and theater in various capacities, and has also transitioned into the world of broadcast media as a spokesperson, guest host, and artist. He hosted several national PBS specials including "WXEL Presents", "Tango: The Spirit of Argentina", and "Fiesta at the Philharmonic".

Alec is the Owner/Founder of: "Paramount Ballroom" a premiere ballroom dance studio in Palm Beach Florida, which has been a training site for Dancing With the Stars Cheryl Burke and Cristián de la Fuente during Season 6 of Dancing with the Stars. More recently, Florence Henderson, better known as Carol Brady from The Brady Bunch, and Latin dance champion Corky Ballas trained at Paramount for D.W.T.S. Season 11.

Lazo currently travels across the United States judging competitions, lecturing, coaching, consulting, and performing. He is a Dance Vision International (DVIDA) certified instructor alongside such names as Maksim Chmerkovskiy and Buddy Schwimmer.

== Titles ==
- U.S. International Rising Star Latin Champion
- U.S. Nine-Dance Champion
- U.S. Grand Finalist
- U.S. Rhythm Finalist
- U.S. Latin Top Ten Finisher (7x)
- Ohio Star Ball Latin Rising Star Champion
- Texas Challenge Rising Star Grand Champion
- Heritage Classic Rising Star Latin Champion
- Sunshine State Rhythm and Smooth Champion
- Grand National Rhythm and Smooth Champion
- Northwest Star Ball Rhythm and Smooth Champion
- Northwest Star Ball Nine-Dance Champion
- Southern States Open Rhythm Champion
- Top Teacher: Dance Heat U.S.A. 2009

== Credentials ==
- Fellow: North American Dance Teachers Association
- Licentiate: Imperial Society of Teachers of Dancing
- Dual Master Examiner: World Professional Dance Teachers Association
- Examiner: International Dancers Association (DIVDA)
- Registered Adjudicator N.D.C.A.: A+B+C+
- Registered Championship Adjudicator N.D.C.A.

=== Film ===
Year	Film	Role	Other notes
1999	Strictly Dancing	Himself	Performed with his then-partner and fellow U.S. Nine-Dance Champion, Denise Lazo.

=== Television ===
Year	Title	Role	Notes
	WXEL Presents	Host (Himself)	
	Tango: The Spirit of Argentina	Host (Himself)	
	Fiesta at the Philharmonic	Lead Dancer (Himself)	
