= USA Dance =

Ballroom dance organization

USA Dance, formerly the United States Amateur Ballroom Dance Association (USABDA), is a national governing body for DanceSport (the competitive version of ballroom dancing) in the United States. It is recognized as such by the World DanceSport Federation (WDSF), the U.S. Olympic Committee (USOC), and the Amateur Sports Act of the United States Congress. In addition to promoting ballroom dancing as a recreational activity, USA Dance also promotes DanceSport nationally and internationally.

USA Dance organizes and hosts the annual USA Dance National DanceSport Championships which awards United States National titles and the opportunity to represent the U.S. at the IDSF World Championships. The 2010 championships were held in Los Angeles, CA and the 2011 championships will be held in Baltimore, MD. The organization has approximately 25,000 paying members and has a connection and outreach to an estimated 200,000 dancers.
