= Dimitri Petrides =

Dimitri Petrides (August 1912 in Cyprus – 1985 in Blackpool) was a ballroom dancer who was instrumental in pioneering and developing Latin American dancing in England and later globally. He left Cyprus when he was eighteen with his mother after the death of his father, eventually settling in England. He was one of the founding members of the Latin-American Faculty of the Imperial Society of Teachers of Dancing, and wrote the first English textbook on the subject ('The Latin American Technique' (1949)). He was a Fellow and Examiner of the ISTD.

Petrides was also an adept linguist speaking Greek, English, French and Italian, so much so that, during World War II he worked as a translator in a prisoner of war camp for Italian prisoners of war and was approached to work as a spy. Later, after the war, Dimitri was in a jewellery shop buying awards for a competition when he met Nina Hunt. She asked him to teach her to dance and together they became adominant force in the Latin American dance world. They were later married, and had a son, Ian.

== Career ==
In 1947 a Latin and American Dancing section of the Ballroom Branch of the Imperial Society of Teachers of Dancing (ISTD) was founded for the purpose of creating a syllabus based around four dances from those countries: the Cuban Ballroom Rumba, the Brazilian Samba, the Spanish Paso Doble and the American Swing (Jive). (The Cuban Cha-cha-cha was also later added) Chaired by Pierre, the new faculty also included his partner Doris Lavelle, Doris Nicols, Gwenethe Walshe and Petrides. This small band of dedicated specialists worked hard to establish an examination system and syllabus for both amateur and professional dancers and in 1951 the Latin and American Dancing section was transformed into a formal branch of the ISTD. Sidney Francis and Walter Laird also joined somewhat later. The syllabus they worked on was eventually agreed upon by 1955 and has ever since been the basis of Latin American dancing. The group improved technique and the framework for teaching and assessment dramatically in these years. Petrides wrote one of the first technique books in English for Latin American dancing in 1949 entitled The Latin-American dances (later edition, 1960, The Latin American technique). Of this book the General Secretary of the ISTD, H. Vivian Davies said:

"... Dimitri Petrides is today recognised as one of the foremost authorities in this county on Latin and American dancing...."

Petrides had been introduced to Walshe by Josephine Bradley, one of the greats of Ballroom dancing whom he met shortly after the War. Bradley suggested that Petrides and Walshe might partner up: they were Britain's first Latin American champions, winning many of the earliest competitions before going on to build on their success and become popular as demonstrators, lecturers, coaches and judges. Later, with Hunt, Petrides became a frequent demonstrator on the BBC's 'Dancing Club' programme.

Such was the success of Petrides and the other members of the ISTD in pioneering and codifying Latin American dancing that in 1955 he could write in 'Victor Silvester's Album' of the dawning of "a Latin American era"

He was also part of a later committee of examiners established circa 1972, which included Sidney Francis, Peggy Spencer, Doris Lavelle, Elizabeth Romain, and Doris Nichols. They prepared the Revised Latin American Technique which states in its foreword "this is the official Latin-American technique upon which all future Imperial examinations are to be conducted". It was translated into numerous languages and is still used by the ISTD in five parts (one for each Latin dance). Petrides continued to work to develop the Latin dances; in the 1970s the 'Rumba Wars' - between advocates of the traditional 'box' style and the newer 'international' style - were ended by the intervention of Petrides and Hunt in favour of modernisation at a conference in Germany.

Dimitri next turned his attentions to establishing competitive dancing and set up several competitions in England including the prestigious All England Championship with Hunt and Sidney Francis. He became a leading examiner and adjudicator, as well as a Fellow of the ISTD. Dimitri continued to work until his death whilst judging at the famous Blackpool Dance Festival.
