= Bill and Bobbie Irvine =

British professional ballroom dancers

Bill & Bobbie Irvine MBE
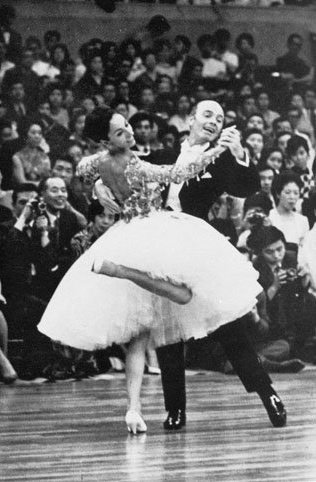
- Bill & Bobbie Irvine

Bill Irvine MBE (30 January 1926 – 13 February 2008) and Bobbie Irvine MBE (27 July 1932 – 30 May 2004) were British professional ballroom dancers. Bobbie Irvine was born Bobbie Barwell in Oudtshoorn, South Africa, while Bill Irvine, born William, was from Low Craigends in Kilsyth. His father was a miner, as was his grandfather, and Bill served in the Royal Navy before starting his dance career. As a young dance teacher he spent a period in South Africa, which led to his meeting Bobbie. They were married in 1957. The pair became South African champions, and later settled in London.

The Irvines won 13 world titles between 1960 and 1968 in the Professional Latin and Professional Modern categories of ballroom dancing. Their principal ballroom teachers were Eric Hancox, Len Scrivener and Sonny Binnick. They were coached in the Latin dances by Nina Hunt, who became a great friend of the couple.

The Irvines are perhaps the most outstanding couple we have ever had in the profession because they have done well over both branches [standard and Latin] and maintained their standard over a number of years. They are good ambassadors for Britain, good teachers, good lecturers, good at everything.

They were honoured for their achievements during their careers by appointment as MBE in 1967, the first such award made for Ballroom dancing.

== Competition record ==
The Irvines' main competitive titles were:

- 1960: World 9 Dance, World Ballroom
- 1961: World Latin
- 1962: World 9 Dance; International, British and World Ballroom
- 1963: World, British Star and International Ballroom; World 9 Dance
- 1964: World, British and Star Ballroom
- 1965: World and Star Latin
- 1966: World, British and Star Ballroom
- 1967: World and Star Ballroom
- 1968: Star Ballroom; World Ballroom; World Latin
