= Sammy Stopford =

British dancer

Sammy Stopford MBE (born 1956) is a British professional ballroom dancer and teacher, and previous winner of the Professional International Latin American Dance Championship.

He competed in Latin dance with three main partners. His partner from 1973–79 was Lyn Aspden (now Lyn Gaskell). They won a number of amateur competitions before turning professional. Their peak achievement was winning the All England Professional Latin Championship in 1979.

He married his next partner, Shirley Rich (now Shirley Ballas), in April 1980. At the time, Rich was an unknown amateur. They became world ranked #1 for two years in the Professional Latin category. They won the 1982 European Professional Latin, the 1983 Professional International Latin American Dance Championship, the British Open Professional Latin championships, and the 1984 Open Professional UK Latin championships. They were at this time the #1 ranked couple in the world.

After his split with Shirley in February 1984, Sammy had another professional partnership with Barbara McColl, another unknown amateur. They also became world #1 and won the International Professional Latin, UK Professional Latin, and the British Open Professional Latin. The pair also won the European Professional Latin, the Star, the Super World Cup, World Team, and the United States Open Latin Championships.

Retired from competition dancing, Stopford and McColl continue to work as dance teachers and coaches to Latin dancers worldwide. As competition organisers, they run the WDC amateur league world championships in Disneyland Paris, along with Donnie Burns and Fred Bijster.
