= World 10 Dance Champions =

This page lists the official World Champions and the countries they represented in the Professional 10-Dance of the World Dance Council (WDC). The championships are authorized and organized under the auspices of the WDC.

The first World 10 Dance Championships took place in 1978 and has been held annually since they were organised by the ICBD in 1980. The ICBD was renamed WD&DSC and renamed again as the WDC. It represents all the major professional DanceSport countries.

The dances covered in the Ten Dance are the five International Ballroom (Standard) dances: waltz, foxtrot, quickstep, tango and Viennese waltz, along with the five International Latin Dances: rumba, samba, paso doble, cha-cha-cha and jive, as defined in ballroom dancing terms.

== World Champions ==
Year	Ten Dance World Champions	Country
1978	David Sycamore & Denise Weavers	Great Britain
1979	David Sycamore & Denise Weavers	Great Britain
1980	David Sycamore & Denise Weavers	Great Britain
1981	David Sycamore & Denise Weavers	Great Britain
1982	David Sycamore & Denise Weavers	Great Britain
1983	David Sycamore & Denise Weavers	Great Britain
1984	David Sycamore & Denise Weavers	Great Britain
1985	David Sycamore & Denise Weavers	Great Britain
1986	Marcus & Karen Hilton	Great Britain
1987	Michael Hull & Patsy Hull-Krogull	Germany
1988	Raymond & Gunn Myhrengen	Norway
1989	Michael Hull & Patsy Hull-Krogull	Germany
1990	Michael Hull & Patsy Hull-Krogull	Germany
1991	Horst & Andrea Beer	Germany
1992	Horst & Andrea Beer	Germany
1993	Martin & Alison Lamb	Great Britain
1994	Bo & Helle Loft Jensen	Denmark
1995	Kim & Cecilie Rygel	Norway
1996	Kim & Cecilie Rygel	Norway
1997	Gary & Diana McDonald	USA
1998	Michael Hull & Mirjam Zweijsen	Germany
1999	Alain Doucet & Anik Jolicoeur	Canada
2000	Alain Doucet & Anik Jolicoeur	Canada
2001	Alain Doucet & Anik Jolicoeur	Canada
2002	Alain Doucet & Anik Jolicoeur	Canada
2003	Adam & Karen Reeve	Iceland
2004	Alain Doucet & Anik Jolicoeur	Canada
2005	Alessandro Garofolo & Annamaria Bassano	Italy
2006	Stefano Fanasca & Michaela Battisti	Italy
2007	Sergej Diemke & Katerina Timofeeva	Germany
2008	Gherman Mustuc & Iveta Lukosiute	USA
2009	Gherman Mustuc & Iveta Lukosiute	USA
2010	Roman Myrkin and Natalia Biedniagina	Ukraine
2011	Nikolai Pilipenchuk & Natalia Skorikova	USA
2012	Eldar Dzhafarov & Anna Sazina	Azerbaijan
2013	Steffen Zoglauer & Sandra Koperski	Germany
2014	Steffen Zoglauer & Sandra Koperski	Germany
2015	Nikolay Govorov & Eugeniya Tolstaya	Russia
2016	Alexander Shindila & Jade Main	England
2017	Title not held	
2018	Nikolay Govorov & Eugeniya Tolstaya	Russia
2019	Jaak Vainomaa & Tiina Tulikallio	Finland
2020	Title not held	
2021	Title not held	
2022	Title not held	
2023	Nikolay Govorov – Evgeniya Tolstay	Russia
2024	Title not held	
2025	Title not held	

== See also ==
- World Ballroom Dance Champions
- World Latin Dance Champions
- Smooth World Champions
- Rhythm World Champions
- U.S. National Dancesport Champions (Professional 10-Dance)
