= World Ballroom Dance Champions =

List of ballroom dancing world champions

This page lists the official World Champions – Professional Ballroom of the World Dance Council (WDC), and its historical predecessors. The championships are authorized and organized under the auspices of the WDC. The designation Ballroom replaces the previously used Modern or Standard in WDC terminology; it does not include the latin dances.

World Championships of a sort have been held in ballroom dancing since 1909 when Camille de Rhynal held annual championships in Paris. Records of the years prior to the First World War are sketchy, and it is only since 1922 when the sport split into professional and amateur levels that complete records have been kept. The 1922 championships were also the first to award a single 'world championship' as opposed to titles in the individual dances. The World Championships were held in France from 1925 to 1939, in Paris except for one year in Nice.

These annual competitions only became official in 1936, and since 1937 the title was held by dancers from the United Kingdom for the rest of that century. With the outbreak of the Second World War, the championships were put on hold for six years. The 2020 WDC World Professional Ballroom Championship, scheduled to take place in Moscow, was cancelled because of the COVID-19 pandemic. Following its revival, the professional ballroom dancing world was becoming more and more fragmented as competing organizations vied for domination. Finally, in September 1950 the ICBD (International Council of Ballroom Dancing) was founded, becoming the world's first international professional dance organisation, and all other competitions claiming to be the 'World Championships' were boycotted by member nations.

The Championships returned once again in 1959 under the control of the ICBD, though that year was something of a trial run. The first officially awarded championship of the new series came in 1960, and have continued since then. The ICBD was renamed as the World Dance & DanceSport Council (WD&DSC), and renamed again as the WDC.

The Professional Ballroom section (occasionally called Professional Modern in British tradition) of dancesport) covers the dances waltz, foxtrot, quickstep, tango and Viennese waltz.

== World Champions ==
Professional Standard World Champions
Year	Winners	Nation
1922	Victor Silvester & Phyllis Clarke	England
1923	no contest held	
1924	Maxwell Stewart & Barbara Miles	England
1925	Maxwell Stewart & Barbara Miles	England
1926	Maxwell Stewart & Pat Sykes	England
1927	Edward Blunt & Doris Germai	England
1928	Maxwell Stewart & Pat Sykes	England
1929	Herbert Jemull & Gerti Hepprich	Germany
1930	Maxwell Stewart & Pat Sykes	England
1931	Arthur Milner & Norma Cave	England
1932	Marcel & Mme Chapoul	France
1933	Sydney Stern & Mae Walmsey	England
1934	Marcel & Mme Chapoul	France
1935	Marcel & Mme Chapoul	France
1936	Marcel & Mme Chapoul	France
1937	Arthur Norton & Pat Eaton	England
1938	Arthur Norton & Pat Eaton	England
1939	Tom Lasson & Ulla Holm/ /Denmark	
1947	Victor Barrett & Doreen Freeman	England
1948	Bob Henderson & Eileen Henshall	England
1949	Bob Henderson & Eileen Henshall	England
1950	Bob Henderson & Eileen Henshall	England
1959	Desmond Ellison & Brenda Winslade	England
1960	Bill and Bobbie Irvine	Scotland
1961	Harry Smith-Hampshire & Doreen Casey	England
1962	Bill & Bobbie Irvine	Scotland
1963	Bill & Bobbie Irvine	Scotland
1964	Bill & Bobbie Irvine	Scotland
1965	Bill & Bobbie Irvine	Scotland
1966	Peter Eggleton & Brenda Winslade	England
1967	Bill & Bobbie Irvine	Scotland
1968	Bill & Bobbie Irvine	Scotland
1969	Peter Eggleton & Brenda Winslade	England
1970	Peter Eggleton & Brenda Winslade	England
1971	Anthony Hurley & Fay Saxton	England
1972	Anthony Hurley & Fay Saxton	England
1973	Richard & Janet Gleave	England
1974	Richard & Janet Gleave	England
1975	Richard & Janet Gleave	England
1976	Richard & Janet Gleave	England
1977	Richard & Janet Gleave	England
1978	Richard & Janet Gleave	England
1979	Richard & Janet Gleave	England
1980	Richard & Janet Gleave	England
1981	Michael & Vicky Barr	England
1982	Michael & Vicky Barr	England
1983	Michael & Vicky Barr	England
1984	Michael & Vicky Barr	England
1985	Michael & Vicky Barr	England
1986	Stephen & Lindsey Hillier	England
1987	Stephen & Lindsey Hillier	England
1988	Stephen & Lindsey Hillier	England
1989	John Wood & Anne Lewis	England
1990	Marcus & Karen Hilton	England
1991	Marcus & Karen Hilton	England
1992	Marcus & Karen Hilton	England
1993	Marcus & Karen Hilton	England
1994	Marcus & Karen Hilton	England
1995	Marcus & Karen Hilton	England
1996	Marcus & Karen Hilton	England
1997	Marcus & Karen Hilton	England
1998	Marcus & Karen Hilton	England
1999	Luca & Loraine Baricchi	England
2000	Augusto Schiavo & Caterina Arzenton	Italy
2001	Luca & Loraine Baricchi	England
2002	Christopher Hawkins & Hazel Newberry	England
2003	Christopher Hawkins & Hazel Newberry	England
2004	Christopher Hawkins & Hazel Newberry	England
2005	Mirko Gozzoli & Alessia Betti	Italy
2006	Mirko Gozzoli & Alessia Betti	Italy
2007	Mirko Gozzoli & Alessia Betti	Italy
2008	Mirko Gozzoli & Alessia Betti	Italy
2009	Arunas Bizokas & Katusha Demidova	USA
2010	Arunas Bizokas & Katusha Demidova	USA
2011	Arunas Bizokas & Katusha Demidova	USA
2012	Arunas Bizokas & Katusha Demidova	USA
2013	Arunas Bizokas & Katusha Demidova	USA
2014	Arunas Bizokas & Katusha Demidova	USA
2015	Arunas Bizokas & Katusha Demidova	USA
2016	Arunas Bizokas & Katusha Demidova	USA
2017	Arunas Bizokas & Katusha Demidova	USA
2018	Arunas Bizokas & Katusha Demidova	USA
2019	Andrea Ghigiarelli & Andracchio-Ghigiarelli	UK
2020	Title not held — COVID pandemic	
2021	Domen Krapez & Natascha Karabey	Germany
2022	Valerio Colantoni & Anna Demidova	USA
2023	Valerio Colantoni & Anna Demidova	USA
2024	Dusan Dragovic & Valeria Dragovic	UK
2025	Dusan Dragovic & Valeria Dragovic	UK
2026	Glenn Richard Boyce & Caroly Janes	UK

== See also ==
- World Latin Dance Champions
- World 10 Dance Champions
- Professional Showdance World Champions
- Dancesport World Champions (smooth)
- Dancesport World Champions (rhythm)
- U.S. National Dancesport Champions (Professional Standard)
- U.S. National Dancesport Champions (Professional 10-Dance)
