= Karen and Marcus Hilton =

British dance couple

Karen Hilton MBE and Marcus Hilton MBE are a British dance couple, noted for competing in the disciplines of Ballroom and Latin American at both amateur and professional level. They have held a number of championship titles, including the World Professional Ballroom Championship, which they have won nine times representing Great Britain. They are patrons of the International Dance Teachers Association and both work as dance teachers, lecturers and competition judges.

== Career ==
The Hiltons first competed together in amateur dance competitions in 1978, achieving Championship titles in the UK for Latin American dance. They also competed in international events, representing Great Britain. In 1980, they took part in the United Kingdom Open Championship, qualifying for the World Amateur Latin American Championships in West Germany. They represented England at the event, achieving 5th place. They later achieved Championship wins in the European and World Amateur 10 Dance Championships.

The Hiltons became a professional dance couple in 1983, winning their first professional title at the British Rising Star Championship. The couple were married in 1986 and continued to dance professionally whilst giving demonstrations, teaching, lecturing and judging. In June 1997, both Karen and Marcus were awarded Membership of the Order of the British Empire in the Queen's Birthday Honours List. They competed professionally until their retirement in 1998, winning numerous Championship titles.

== Titles and awards ==
The following is a complete list of titles and awards won by the Hiltons:

=== 1981-1983 (Amateur) ===
- 1981 - World Amateur 10 Dance Champions
- 1982 - World Amateur 10 Dance Champions
- 1982 - World Amateur Latin Champions
- 1982 - British Open Amateur Latin Champions (Blackpool)
- 1983 - World Amateur Latin Champions
- 1983 - British Open Amateur Latin Champions (Blackpool)

=== 1984 (Professional) ===
- British Rising Star Champions

=== 1986 ===
- World Professional 10 Dance Champions
- European Professional 10 Dance Champions
- World Ballroom Championship - 3rd Place

=== 1989 ===
- World Professional Ballroom Segue Champions
- BDF Award
- USA Open Championship - Winners

=== 1990 ===
- World Ballroom Champions
- European Ballroom Champions
- British Ballroom Champions
- British Open Championship - Winners
- USA Open Championship - Winners
- Norway Open Championship - Winners
- World Cup - Winners

=== 1991 ===
- World Ballroom Champions
- International Champions
- United Kingdom Champions
- USA Open - Winners

=== 1992 ===
- World Champions
- International Champions
- United Kingdom Champions
- British Ballroom Champions
- USA Open - Winners
- BDF Award - Winners

=== 1993 ===
- World Champions
- International Champions
- European Ballroom Champions
- United Kingdom Champions
- German Open - Winners
- USA Open - Winners
- World Trophy - Winners
- World Grand Prix - Winners
- World Classic Show Dance - Winners
- Carl Alan Award Winners
- BDF Award Winners

=== 1994 ===
- World Champions
- International Champions
- European Ballroom Champions
- British Ballroom Champions
- United Kingdom Champions
- USA Open - Winners
- Japanese Open - Winners
- World Classic Show Dance - Winners
- Super World Cup - Winners
- Woman of the Year Rochdale - Karen

=== 1995 ===
- World Champions
- International Champions
- British Ballroom Champions
- United Kingdom Champions
- European Ballroom Champions
- USA Open - winners
- Carl Alan Award
- BDF Award Winners
- Man of the Year Rochdale - Marcus

=== 1996 ===
- World Champions
- International Champions
- British Ballroom Champions
- United Kingdom Champions
- European Ballroom Champions
- USA Open - winners
- Japanese Open - Winners
- BDF Award Winners

=== 1997 ===
- World Champions
- International Champions
- British Ballroom Champions
- United Kingdom Champions
- German Open - Winners
- USA Open - Winners
- UK Open - Winners
- British Open - Winners
- US Open - Winners
- Both Awarded the MBE

=== 1998 ===
- World Champions
- British Ballroom Champions
- United Kingdom Champions
- International Champions
- Carl Alan Award
- BDF Award Winners
