= Katusha Demidova =

Russian-American ballroom dancer, coach, and adjudicator

- Born: 4 January 1978 (age 48); Moscow, Russian SFSR, Soviet Union
- Occupations: ballroom dancer, coach, adjudicator
- Years active: 1996-2019 (competitive)
- Known for: Ten-time World Professional Ballroom Champion; Twenty-time U.S. National Professional Ballroom Champion; Eight-time British Open (Blackpool Dance Festival) Professional Ballroom Champion
- Partners: Jonathan Wilkins, Arūnas Bizokas
- Relatives: Anna Demidova (sister)

Katusha Demidova (Russian: Катюша Демидова, born 4 January 1978) is a Russian-American professional ballroom dancer, coach, and adjudicator. She is a ten-time World Professional Ballroom Champion, twenty-time U.S. National Professional Ballroom Champion and eight-time British Open (Blackpool Dance Festival) Professional Ballroom Champion, titles she held consecutively and undefeated throughout her competitive career. She competed internationally in the Standard (International Ballroom) division and won multiple world and national championships with partners Jonathan Wilkins and Arūnas Bizokas.

== Early life and family ==
Demidova was born in Moscow, Russian SFSR, Soviet Union. Her father introduced her to ballroom dancing at the age of seven. At sixteen, she began competing professionally and later relocated to the United States to pursue her career. Her younger sister, Anna Demidova, is also a professional ballroom dancer.

== Career ==
Demidova began her professional partnership with English dancer Jonathan Wilkins, which lasted from 1997 to 2007. The culmination of their partnership was the first place at the USA Open Professional Ballroom Championship, marking their dominance on the American competitive scene. The pair went on to win ten U.S. National Professional Ballroom Championships and the 2004 World Classic Showdance Championship. They also performed on television programs including Dancing with the Stars, PBS’s Championship Ballroom Dancing, and America’s Ballroom Challenge.

In 2007, Demidova formed a partnership with Lithuanian dancer Arūnas Bizokas.They won the Ohio Star Ball soon after their debut and finished second at the UK Open later that season.

From 2009 to 2018, the couple won ten consecutive World Professional Ballroom Championships and eight British Open titles at the Blackpool Dance Festival. They also won ten consecutive U.S. National Professional International Ballroom Championships between 1998 and 2017. Demidova and Bizokas announced their retirement after their 2019 performance at the Blackpool Dance Festival.

== Coaching and later work ==
Demidova is the organizer of the North American Imperial Star Ball in Chicago and part owner of Rogers Dance Center in New Jersey.

Following her retirement from her competitive career, Demidova continued working as an international coach, adjudicator, and event organizer.

== Personal life ==
Katusha resides in New Jersey, USA, where she continues to mentor and train leading ballroom professionals.

== Titles and achievements ==
Year(s)	Title / Competition	Partner(s)	Notes / Source
1998 - 2017	U.S. National Professional International Ballroom Champion (20×)	Jonathan Wilkins, Arūnas Bizokas	Undefeated record over two decades.
2009 - 2018	World Professional Ballroom Champion (10×)	Arūnas Bizokas	Ten consecutive world titles.
2008 - 2018	British Open (Ballroom) Champion (9×)	Arūnas Bizokas	Won at the Blackpool Dance Festival (did not contest 2017).
2004	World Classic Showdance Champion	Jonathan Wilkins	Orlando event.
