= World Latin Dance Champions =

Annual dance competition winners

This page lists the official World Champions – Professional Latin of the World Dance Council (WDC). The championships are authorized and organized under the auspices of the WDC, and held annually in the last quarter of each year. The competition comprises five dances: Cha-Cha-Cha, Samba, Rumba, Paso Doble and Jive, as defined in ballroom dancing terms.

Official World Championships have been held in the Latin section of ballroom dancing since they were organised by the ICBD in 1959. The ICBD was renamed WD&DSC and has been renamed again to its present title. The WDC represents all the major professional DanceSport countries. Unofficial world championships were held, usually in Paris, by several organisers pre-World War II. Some of these events included one or two Latin dances in the same competition as ballroom dances. As these events had no official standing, they are not noticed here. There is one earlier international Latin dance championship; it started in 1953 at the Elsa Wells International Dance Championships in London (see International Latin American Dance Champions). Both series have continued annually.

== World Champions ==
Professional Latin World Champions
Year	Couple	Country
1959	Leonard Patrick & Doreen Key	Great Britain
1960	Bill and Bobbie Irvine	South Africa
1961	Bill and Bobbie Irvine	Scotland
1962	Walter Laird & Lorraine Reynolds	England
1963	Walter Laird & Lorraine Reynolds	England
1964	Walter Laird & Lorraine Reynolds	England
1965	Walter & Marianne Kaiser	Switzerland
1966	Bill & Bobbie Irvine	Scotland
1967	Rudolf & Mechthild Trautz	Germany
1968	Bill & Bobbie Irvine	Scotland
1969	Rudolf & Mechthild Trautz	Germany
1970	Rudolf & Mechthild Trautz	Germany
1971	Rudolf & Mechthild Trautz	Germany
1972	Wolfgang & Evelyn Opitz	Germany
1973	Hans-Peter & Ingeborg Fischer	Austria
1974	Hans-Peter & Ingeborg Fischer	Austria
1975	Hans-Peter & Ingeborg Fischer	Austria
1976	Peter Maxwell & Lynn Harman	England
1977	Alan & Hazel Fletcher	England
1978	Alan & Hazel Fletcher	England
1979	Alan & Hazel Fletcher	England
1980	Alan & Hazel Fletcher	England
1981	Alan & Hazel Fletcher	England
1982	Espen & Kirsten Salberg	Norway
1983	Espen & Kirsten Salberg	Norway
1984	Donnie Burns & Gaynor Fairweather	Scotland/England
1985	Donnie Burns & Gaynor Fairweather	Scotland/England
1986	Donnie Burns & Gaynor Fairweather	Scotland/England
1987	Donnie Burns & Gaynor Fairweather	Scotland/England
1988	Donnie Burns & Gaynor Fairweather	Scotland/England
1989	Donnie Burns & Gaynor Fairweather	Scotland/England
1990	Donnie Burns & Gaynor Fairweather	Scotland/England
1991	Donnie Burns & Gaynor Fairweather	Scotland/England
1992	Donnie Burns & Gaynor Fairweather	Scotland/England
1993	Donnie Burns & Gaynor Fairweather	Scotland/England
1994	Donnie Burns & Gaynor Fairweather	Scotland/England
1995	Donnie Burns & Gaynor Fairweather	Scotland/England
1996	Donnie Burns & Gaynor Fairweather	Scotland/England
1997	Hans-Reinhard Galke & Bianka Schreiber	Germany
1998	Donnie Burns & Gaynor Fairweather	Scotland/England
1999	Bryan Watson & Carmen Vincelj	Germany
2000	Bryan Watson & Carmen Vincelj	Germany
2001	Bryan Watson & Carmen Vincelj	Germany
2002	Bryan Watson & Carmen Vincelj	Germany
2003	Bryan Watson & Carmen Vincelj	Germany
2004	Bryan Watson & Carmen Vincelj	Germany
2005	Bryan Watson & Carmen Vincelj	Germany
2006	Bryan Watson & Carmen Vincelj	Germany
2007	Bryan Watson & Carmen Vincelj	Germany
2008	Michał Malitowski & Joanna Leunis	Poland
2009	Michał Malitowski & Joanna Leunis	Poland
2010	Riccardo Cocchi & Yulia Zagoruychenko	USA
2011	Riccardo Cocchi & Yulia Zagoruychenko	USA
2012	Riccardo Cocchi & Yulia Zagoruychenko	USA
2013	Riccardo Cocchi & Yulia Zagoruychenko	USA
2014	Riccardo Cocchi & Yulia Zagoruychenko	USA
2015	Riccardo Cocchi & Yulia Zagoruychenko	USA
2016	Riccardo Cocchi & Yulia Zagoruychenko	USA
2017	Riccardo Cocchi & Yulia Zagoruychenko	USA
2018	Riccardo Cocchi & Yulia Zagoruychenko	USA
2019	Riccardo Cocchi & Yulia Zagoruychenko	USA
2020	Title not held — COVID pandemic	
2021	Dorin Frecautanu and Marina Sergeeva	Great Britain
2022	Dorin Frecautanu and Marina Sergeeva	Great Britain
2023	Dorin Frecautanu and Marina Sergeeva	Great Britain
2024	Dorin Frecautanu and Marina Sergeeva	Great Britain
2025	Dorin Frecautanu and Marina Sergeeva	Great Britain

== See also ==
- International Latin American Dance Champions
- Rhythm World Champions
- Smooth World Champions
- U.S. National Dancesport Champions (Professional Latin)
- U.S. National Dancesport Champions (Professional 10-Dance)
- World 10 Dance Champions
- World Ballroom Dance Champions
