= Dancesport =

Ballroom dancing as a sport

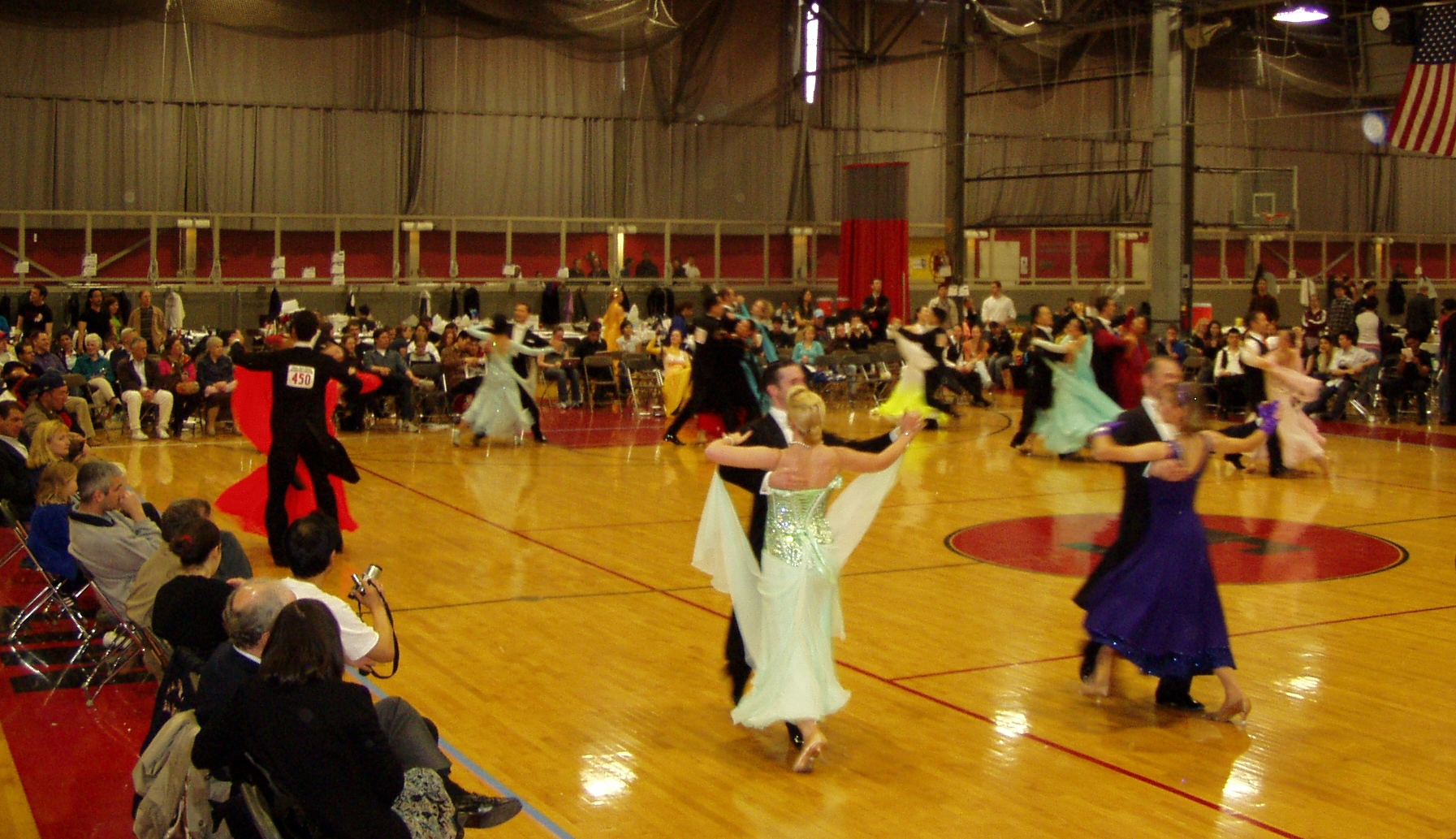
- An amateur dancesport competition at MIT
- Highest governing body: WDSF and WDC

Characteristics
- Mixed-sex: Yes
- Venue: Ballroom

Presence
- Olympic: No, but recognized by the IOC
- World Games: 1997 – present

Dancesport (also stylized as DanceSport) is competitive dancing, as contrasted with social or exhibition dancing. The term dancesport encompasses many dance disciplines (e.g., Acrobatic Rock'n'Roll, Boogie Woogie, Breaking, Hip Hop, and Ballroom). Most dancesport disciplines are competed by couples, but there are solo styles (e.g., Breaking) and group styles (e.g., Formation dance). In the case of Para dancesport, at least one of the dancers is in a wheelchair.

Dancesport events are sanctioned and regulated by dancesport organizations at the national and international level, such as (for Ballroom dance) the World DanceSport Federation, the World Dance Council, and the World Dance Organization.

The name was invented to help competitive ballroom dancing gain Olympic recognition. The physical demand of dancesport has been the subject of scientific research.

== History ==
The first unofficial world championship for Ballroom dance took place in 1909, and the first formation team was presented in 1932 by Olive Ripman at the Astoria Ballroom, London. The first Ballroom dancesport competition to be broadcast on TV was in Germany in 1960.

== Styles of Ballroom dancesport ==
Dancesport competitions are held in the Ballroom discipline in four styles, two in International Style and two in American Style. These include the following categories:

- International Standard
- International Latin
- American Smooth
- American Rhythm

These categories apply to both individual couples and formation dance. Some competitions under USA Dance and WDSF also offer solo events where individuals compete by themselves (i.e., without a partner) in either the leader or follower role and are judged on their form and execution of technique. These events were added to give more opportunities for dancers without partners to compete.

== International governing organizations ==
=== World Dance Council ===
The World Dance Council (WDC) is a registered limited company, and the legal successor to the International Council of Ballroom Dancing (ICBD), which was formed in 1950 in Edinburgh. The WDC operates through a general council and two committees:

- The World Dance Sport Committee regulates professional dancesport at the international level.
- The World Social Dance Committee "deals with all matters of the dance profession that relate to the activities of Dance Schools and Dance Teachers". It does not regulate social dance directly – that is the business of individual organisers, the dance teacher organisations, such as the Imperial Society of Teachers of Dancing, and the chains of dance teaching schools in the United States.

In 2007 the WDC Amateur League was created. This organisation runs a number of competitions and has its own world ranking system for amateur dancers.

Each member country in the WDC has its own national organisation, such as the British Dance Council, which acts as a forum for the many interested parties in that country. The national bodies decide on their delegates to the WDC.

=== World DanceSport Federation ===
The World DanceSport Federation (WDSF), formerly the International DanceSport Federation (IDSF), is the international governing body of dancesport, as recognised by the International Olympic Committee (IOC).

Founded in 1957 as the International Council of Amateur Dancers (ICAD), it took up the name International DanceSport Federation in 1990. In 2011 it changed its name to World DanceSport Federation to emphasise the organization's global character.

In the past, the IDSF's focus was on administering amateur dancers and competitions. However, in 2010 the IDSF Professional Division was created (formerly known as the IPDSC), which extended this focus to professional dancesport.

WDSF members are only allowed to dance in competitions that are on the WDSF's official competition calendar, unless the member has obtained the WDSF's written permission to compete in an event that is not on the WDSF's calendar.

=== World Dance Organization ===
The World Dance Organization (WDO) was founded with the name World Dance Organizers in 2019 with the first meeting being held on May 30, 2019, in Blackpool, England. The named was changed to the current World Dance Organization in December 2020. The controlling legal entity is the non-profit WDO Community Interest Company which was registered in England in September 2019.

== Competitions ==
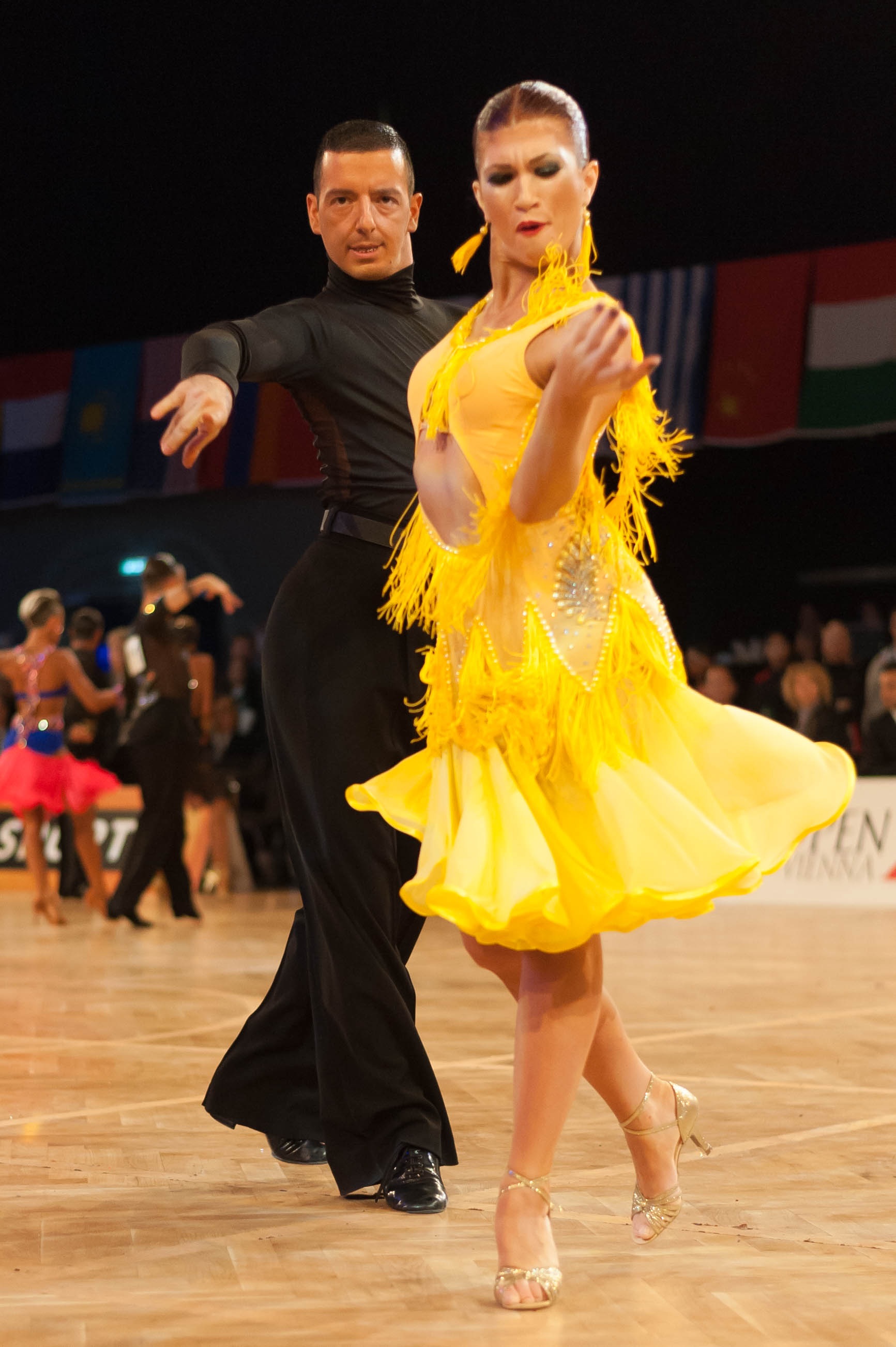
Young couple dancing cha-cha-cha at competitions in Austria.

There are a wide variety of dance competitions. They range from the well known Blackpool Dance Festival, an event open to all, to competitions conducted exclusively for university students, such as those hosted by the Inter Varsity Dance Association in the UK.

Amateur competitions commonly include events that group dancers by age, experience, or both. For example, events might group young dancers by age, such as: juvenile (<12yrs), junior (12-16yrs), and youth (16-19yrs). Events may sometimes cover a wide range of ages, with groupings such as: under 21yrs, adult, senior I (over 35yrs), senior II (over 45yrs), senior III (over 55yrs), and senior IV (over 65yrs).

Competitors may also be grouped by experience level, with categories such as Beginner, Novice, Intermediate, Pre-Amateur and Amateur. These generally correspond to the number of the dances to be performed in the competition, with Beginners performing one dance, and those at Amateur level performing five. In some competitions these are categorized into grades from A to E, with "A" the equivalent of the Amateur level, and "E" corresponding to the "Beginner" level.

=== WDSF minimum competition dance area size standard ===
WDSF governing bodies in different countries have the flexibility to decide on the dance area size for competitions held in the country.

Location	Official Standard	Compare Square Meter	Compare Square Feet
Europe	26m x 16m	416	4478
China	23m x 15m	345	3714
USA	60' x 36'	201	2160
Canada	60' x 35'	195	2100

In December 2011, the WDSF Open and the Australian Nationals were held at the Hisense Arena located within the Olympic park in Melbourne. The floor was at 84 by 37.7 meters which was 7.61 times the size of what WDSF requires.

=== Rules ===
The World Dance Council (WDC) rules for international competitions are lengthy and detailed. The music for competitions is kept confidential until the event. The music always follows a strict tempo and, for a couples competition, it will have a duration of no less than 90 seconds, and no more than two minutes.

Some elementary competitions are restricted to "basic" steps, but international competitions are open as to choreography, within the limits of the traditional style of the individual dances. Only the Viennese waltz has defined choreography: it is limited to seven well-specified figures. Lifts are not permitted, except for Show Dance titles. The tempo for each dance is defined. In the finals, couples are marked under the skating system and judged by timing, footwork, rise and fall, alignment, direction and floor craft. Competitors must meet World Anti-Doping Agency rules.

=== Dancesport as an Olympic event ===
After a long campaign, the World DanceSport Federation (WDSF), formerly IDSF, was recognized by the International Olympic Committee as the sole representative body for dancesport, on September 5, 1997. At that point, many dance organisations changed their titles to incorporate the word sport. This recognition gives the IDSF, potentially, a unique status. The WDSF website shows letters and certificates from the IOC that recognise dancesport as an eligible sport for inclusion pursuant to rule 29 of the Olympic Charter. On its website, the IDSF gives an upbeat appraisal of the chances of dancesport being included in a future summer Olympic Games. However, dancesport has not been included as an official event at the Olympics since its recognition, and there are many who doubt that it ever will. The 2008 Beijing Olympics did not include ballroom dancing and neither did the 2012 London Olympics. However, it was announced in December 2016 that breakdancing would form part of the programme for the 2018 Summer Youth Olympics under the "dancesport" label, with men's, women's and mixed-team events included in a one-on-one battle format. Breakdancing competitions at the 2024 Summer Olympics ran from 9 to 10 August at Place de la Concorde, Paris, marking the sport's official debut in the program and the first dancesport discipline to appear in Summer Olympic history.

=== Physical demands ===
Over the years, competitive ballroom dancing has evolved in its choreography, requiring a higher level of athleticism. Many individuals that spectate or dance socially often underestimate the physical attributes and demands of dancesport competitive dancing. In order to compete at a world level, elite competitive dancers undergo rigorous training to help and enhance their competition performance. These dancers seem to perform at very high levels of energy expenditure, and a deeper understanding of these energy demands may help build specific training programs used to sustain a high quality dance performance consistent over a few rounds of a competition.

In 1988, an Australian study was conducted to determine the heart rate and estimated energy expended during ballroom dancing. Professors Blanksby and Reidy of the Department of Human Movement and Recreation Studies at the University of Western had ten competitive ballroom dance couples simulate a dancesport competition, dancing their competitive routines in either the Latin American or Standard division. After administrating all required laboratory tests (in order to record their height, weight, body fat percentage, fat free mass and the resting/maximal heart rate and VO2 values), the couples danced a five-dance final, given a 15 to 20 second break between each dance. Throughout the final their heart rates were telemetered and recorded. The purpose of this study was to estimate the energy requirements from heart rates acquired during competition simulation and previously recorded measures of VO2 and HR.

The average heart rate for male dancers in Standard was 170 beats min^{−1} and 168 beats min^{−1} in the Latin American. Females elicited 179 beats min^{−1} and 177 beats min^{−1} respectively. Astrand and Rodahl (1977) classify any exercise being extremely heavy if it results in a heart rate above 150 beats min^{−1}. They also classify an exercise as extremely heavy if oxygen consumption is higher than 2.0L min^{−1}. All but the females in the Standard dance sequence did not exceed an oxygen consumption level of 2.0L min^{−1}. Finally, the energy expenditure for male athletes was estimated to be 54.1 ± 8.1 kJ min^{−1} for Standard and 54.0± 9.6kJ min^{−1} in the Latin American dances. For females it was 34.7 ± 3.8 kJ min^{−1} and 36.1 ± 4.1 kJ min^{−1} respectively.

Two other similar experiments were conducted exhibiting very similar results and analyses. In all three of the experiments, significant differences in the energy expenditure between the male and female athletes were noticed. Generally males had a higher energy expenditure than their female counterparts. This is evident due to the anthropometric differences between the two sexes and the oxygen transport capacity.

Comparing the mean gross energy expenditures (in kJ min^{−1}) between ballroom dancing and other sports, it is evident that competitive dancing is equally as demanding in comparison to other sporting activities such as basketball (35.83 kJ min^{−1}) or cross-country running (44.37kJ min^{−1}) (Consolazioetal, 1963), and that competitive ballroom dancing requires a cardiovascular system that can work at a high energy level in order to match the given physiological strain.

== Para dancesport ==
Previously known as Wheelchair dancesport until it was rebranded in 2016, Para dancesport consists of couples can competing in two kinds of events: combi (one standing partner and one wheelchair partner) or duo (both dancers are in wheelchairs). Disciplines contested in Para dance sport are: standard, Latin, singles and freestyle. Disciplines in couples events are combi standard, combi Latin, combi freestyle, duo standard, duo Latin and duo freestyle. The Freestyle and singles disciplines were introduced in 2014. Both were contested for the first time at a World Championship in 2015 in Rome, Italy.

== See also ==
- Dance basic topics
- Dancesport at the 2005 Southeast Asian Games
- Dancesport at the 2007 Southeast Asian Games
- Dancesport at the 2019 Southeast Asian Games
- Dancesport at the 2010 Asian Games
- Dancesport at the World Games
- Formation dance
- English Amateur Dancesport Association
- Figure skating
- List of dance organizations
- List of DanceSport dances
- World 10 Dance Champions
- World Ballroom Dance Champions
- World Latin Dance Champions
