= World Dance Council =

Organization succeeding the International Council of Ballroom Dancing

The World Dance Council Ltd (WDC), is a registered limited company, the legal successor to the International Council of Ballroom Dancing, and was established at a meeting organized by Phillip J. S. Richardson on 22 September 1950 in Edinburgh, Scotland. From 1996 to 2006, the WDC was known as the World Dance & Dance Sport Council Ltd (WD&DSC). The stated mission of the World Dance Council is to inspire, stimulate and promote excellence in education for the World Dance Council and Amateur League (WDC and AL) community.

The primary objective, at the time of the organization's formation, was to provide an agreed basis for holding world championships in competitive ballroom dance. That objective has been achieved. Initially consisting of nine European countries and three others, today the WDC has become the leading authority on professional dance competitions, with members in numerous countries throughout the world. Each country is allowed one vote. As of 2006, there are 59 members. The WDC's governing body, the Presidium, consists of a President and a number of Vice-Presidents. In 2014, seven Vice-Presidents were elected.

WDC includes the Competitive Dance Committee, the Dancesation Committee, and a private public partnership agreement with the WDC Amateur League (WDCAL).

== Mode of operation ==
The WDC is democratic in its operation. All major decisions are taken on the basis of one full member, one vote. The full members are (with a few exceptions) individual countries. There are some Affiliate members, such as the Ballroom Dancers Federation International. The WDC operates through a general council and two committees:

- The World Competitive Dance Committee regulates professional competitive dancing and all matters to do with competitions and their regulations.
- The Dancesation Committee deals with all matters of the dance profession that relate to the activities of Dance Schools and Dance Teachers and all other forms of dance like performing arts, hip Hop, Argentine Tango to name but a few. It does not regulate social dance directly. That is the business of individual organisers.
- The WDC Amateur League was founded in 2007. It regulates and designates the World and continental Amateur championships and licenses and regulates Amateur Dancing.

Each member country in the WDC has its own national organisation, such as the British Dance Council, which acts as a forum for the interested parties in that country. The national bodies decide on their delegates to the WDC. The WDC also operates a WDC National Dance Council system in certain countries, which allows a multi-member system within that NDC, fostering the co-operation of major dance organisations in these countries.

== WDC events ==
These events are under WDC regulation, but organised in various countries each year.

- World Championship – Professional Ballroom
- World Championship – Professional Latin
- World Championship – Professional 10-Dance
- European Championship – Professional 10-Dance
- European Championship – Professional Latin

There are also other events, which are licensed to organising countries, and are open entry.

- WDC Amateur League Open Amateur World Championships & Professional Cups.
- World Masters Latin
- WDC World Cup. In 2009, this event in Shenzhen, China had over 2000 participants.

In the regulations, the facility is also available for professional competitions in:

- Ballroom Show Dance
- Latin American Show Dance

=== WDC competition rules ===
1. The WDC Championships are open championships.
2. The national bodies nominate their best available couples, and only two couples are permitted from any one country. Additionally 3 Wild Cards from the World Series Ranking List are invited. WDC registered competitors can take part as open entries.

== Presidents ==
- P. J. S. Richardson MBE (ICBD)
- Alex Moore MBE (ICBD)
- Bill Irvine MBE (ICBD)
- Leonard Morgan (ICBD)
- Robin Short (WD&DSC)
- Karl Breuer (WD&DSC)
- Donnie Burns MBE

== World Championship winners ==
- World Ballroom Dance Champions
- World Latin Dance Champions
- World 10 Dance Champions
- World Ballroom Dance Champions Amateur

== See also ==
- World DanceSport Federation
- Ballroom dance
- Competitive dance
- Ballroom Dancers' Federation
- Dancesport
