= List of dance organizations =

There are many national or international dance organizations around the world, including governing bodies, teaching associations and examination boards.

== Organisations covering multiple dance styles ==
- Aboriginal Islander Dance Theatre, Australia (defunct)
- Australian Dance Council
- British Association of Teachers of Dance
- bbodance (formerly the British Ballet Organisation) - musical theatre, ballet, jazz, tap, modern
- CDMT (Council for Dance, Drama and Musical Theatre), UK
- Dancewave, Brooklyn, New York City
- Imperial Society of Teachers of Dancing, UK - ballet, modern, theatre, national dance, Greek dance, Classical Indian, ballroom, sequence, disco
- International Dance Teachers Association, UK
- International Dance Council, part of UNESCO, based in Paris, France
- National Aboriginal Islander Skills Development Association, Australia
- National Dance Alliance (NDA)
- National Dance Association (defunct)
- National Dance Education Organization, Maryland, US
- One Dance UK
- TANEČNÍ SVAZ ČR
- UKA Dance
- Universal Dance Association (UDA)

== Organisations for specific dance styles ==
=== Folk dancing ===
- Country Dance and Song Society

=== Ballet/contemporary/jazz ===
- American Dance Guild
- Royal Academy of Dance

=== Ballroom (including dancesport) ===
- British Dance Council
- Canadian Amateur DanceSport Association
- English Amateur Dancesport Association
- European Tournament for Dancing Students
- Swedish Dancesport Federation
- World Dance Council
- World DanceSport Federation

=== Country and western ===
- United Country Western Dance Council

=== Rock'n'roll, modern jive, swing ===
- World Rock'n'Roll Confederation

=== Irish dance ===
- An Coimisiún Le Rincí Gaelacha (Irish Dancing Commission)
- Comhdháil na Múinteoirí le Rincí Gaelacha (Congress of Irish Dance Teachers)
- World Irish Dance Association

=== Competitive Dance ===
- OneBeat Dance Brands (Beyond The Stars, Groove, Breakout, and Reverb Dance Competitions)

== See also ==
- List of dance companies
