= Lyndon Wainwright =

British metrologist, ballroom dancer and author

Lyndon Bentley Wainwright (7 December 1919 – 2 January 2018) was a British metrologist, ballroom dancer and author. He worked at the National Physical Laboratory (NPL) during World War II, and was a chairman of the British Engineering Metrology Association.

After the war, he was a leading exhibition dancer, and one of a small group of experts who introduced Latin American dance to Britain. Wainwright wrote nine books on ballroom dancing. He received the Carl Alan Award for 1996–99, and other honours from the dance community. He was an expert on phonogram performance rights and was a member of the British Ring of the International Brotherhood of Magicians.

== Personal life ==
Born in Scarborough, Yorkshire in 1919, Wainwright married three times: to Felicia Heslop (m. 1943–60; divorced); Isobel Scott (m. 1964–69; divorced), and Yvonne Gandy (m. 1973–2011; her death).

He had one son, Mark, from his second marriage and four grandchildren, Annabel, Connor, Ewan, and Brodie. He died in January 2018 at the age of 98.

== Metrology ==
After his education and upbringing in Scarborough, Wainwright joined the NPL, the largest applied physics laboratory in the UK, in 1939. There he trained and worked as an engineering metrologist. From September 1939, this facility worked mainly in support of the war effort, and so employment there was to some extent a reserved occupation: key employees were not called up for military service if the employer made appropriate application to the War Office. In addition to their work, staff members were expected to join the NPL Fire Brigade as part-timers or the ARP (air-raid warning and fire watch).

Later in life, when his active career as a dancer was over, Lyndon returned to metrology, working at the National Engineering Laboratory in East Kilbride, Scotland for four years, and then for seven years was head of quality control and metrology at PIRA, the Research Association for the Printing, Packaging and Paper Making Industries (formerly PATRA, the Printing Industry Research Association) in Leatherhead, Surrey. In this capacity he lectured in the UK and abroad, and sat on committees of the International Association of Research Organizations in the Printing Industries. Wainwright was chairman of the English Metrology Association from 1967 to 1972.

== Career in dance ==
Wainwright met his first wife, Felicia (14 April 1920 – September 1993), in 1940, and they soon started to train as a ballroom dance couple. They married in 1943, the year they first gave a dance exhibition for payment. After taking coaching from Monsieur Pierre, they started to compete as a professional couple. In 1948 they won the Premier Prix in a World's Professional Eight Dance Ballroom championship, staged in Paris.

The couple then specialised in the Latin dances and helped to introduce these dance forms to the British public. The partnership was billed as Lyndon & Felicia for their dance exhibitions, which were given in clubs, ballrooms, restaurants, celebrations and on television. On BBC tv, they appeared with the Edmundo Ros Orchestra, and Victor Silvester's BBC Dancing Club, dancing rumba, samba, paso doble and mambo. Between 1950 and 1960, the pair were probably the leading exhibition dancers of Latin American style in England. At their peak, they were presenting over 400 shows a year, often several times at different venues on a Sunday, and they also ran dance studios in Kingston, Ewell and Purley in Greater London. They were engaged to perform every alternate Dancers' Night for a year at the Hammersmith Palais.

=== Reviews of the partnership ===
"The highlights of their career are their appearances as demonstrators at the first ever World Congress of Teachers of Dancing organised by the Official Board of Ballroom Dancing, their several appearances on television with Edmundo Ros and Victor Silvester, and their demonstrations in Switzerland, Holland, Éire, Ulster and Denmark...

"Lyndon and Felicia are now well on their way to their two thousandth demonstration... Within Great Britain they have travelled over 100,000 miles to give demonstrations... It is estimated that nearly one million people have seen these demonstrations personally, apart from those who have seen them on the television screen."

"Together they broke box office records all over the country, in an era when England was producing the most beautiful dancers in the world." Kenneth Lee.

"If ever a list is produced of the six best show business [acts] from the world of ballroom dancing in the past 50 years, it would not be complete without [them]." Walter Laird.

"They must have been one of the top ranking and highest paid duos of that and many other eras." Bob More.

"In the early 50s Lyndon & Felicia were well known for their wonderful cabaret – they didn't follow the normal trend – they studied all types of Latin American rhythms. Some that they danced, such as Blues, Mambo and the Mexican Jarabe, are quite new to many people today, but Lyndon and Felicia studied them, and presented every time a cabaret with a difference." Peggy Spencer.

=== Later dance work ===
Many years later, the BBC invited Lyndon to take part in a television documentary Last Man at the Palais dealing with the history of the Hammersmith Palais. The Palais had opened in 1919 as a dance hall and entertainment venue, and finally closed in 2007. With a fellow professional, Lyndon danced a waltz, which was the last dance shown on the televised program, first screened on BBC Four on Christmas Eve 2007.

After his dance partnership and marriage ended in 1960, Wainwright devoted himself to teaching, writing and the administrative side of the dance world. He was Executive Councillor, Hon. Treasurer, and Company Secretary of the International Dance Teachers Association (IDTA). He served as a delegate to the British Dance Council and as founder and Hon Secretary of its Teachers' Committee, and on the Council for Dance Education and Training, and the Central Council of Physical Recreation. He was an acknowledged expert in the Performing and Phonographic Rights involved in playing music in public. For over 50 years he contributed articles to dance magazines such as Dance Teacher (now Dance International), Ballroom Dancing Times (now Dance Today), and Dance Expression. Wainwright also wrote articles for the Daily Mirror.

The dance profession has honoured Lyndon for his services to dance. In 1996 and 1999 he received the Carl Alan Award, in 1998 the Classique de Danse, in 2000 the President's Award of the Ballroom Dancers' Federation, and in 2005 the Distinguished Service Award of the IDTA.

=== Membership of dance organisations ===
Wainwright is or has been a member of these dance organisations:

- Member, Academie des Maitres de Danse de Paris.
- Fellow, Executive Councillor, Hon. Treasurer and Examiner (Ballroom and Latin-American branch), International Dancing Masters' Association (IDMA).
- Member, Midland Association of Teachers of Dancing (Latin American branch).
- Member, Scottish Dance Teachers' Alliance.
- Member, Imperial Society of Teachers of Dancing (Ballroom branch).
- Member and Examiner, Ballroom and Latin branches. Executive Councillor, Hon. Treasurer, and Company Secretary of the International Dance Teachers Association (IDTA).
- Vice-president of La Sociedad Internacional de Profesores en Baile en España. [Danscene, 21 September 1989]

== Publications by Lyndon Wainwright ==
=== Books ===
- Lyndon & Felicia: Ballroom dances of the Continent and Latin America. [1949]. This book included the rumba, the samba, the paso-doble, the blues, the Viennese waltz, the jive, the conga and the tango: an exceptionally wide range of dances.
- First steps to ballroom dancing. Lyric books, London 1993.
- The story of British popular dance. IDTA 1997.
- The dance teacher's handbook. British Dance Council. 2001. Advice on what you need to consider before you open your first dance school; the general process of teaching; and the business aspects of running a school.
- Strictly dancing ballroom. ABC, Sydney 2005.
- Let's dance: the essential guide to ballroom for amateur dancers. HarperCollins, London 2005. This, a best seller, has been translated into five other languages.
- Latin dancing (Need to know series). HarperCollins, London 2006.
- Ballroom dancing (Need to know series). HarperCollins, London 2007.
- Blowin' in the wind: the life of an innocent. IDTA 2012. Autobiography of Lyndon Wainwright.

=== Engineering papers ===
- Munday F.D. and Wainwright L. 1965. The story of S.I. units and their use in the paper and board industry. Paper Technology, 11, pp. 39–46.
- Wainwright L. 1966. The equipment and services of the PATRA metrology section. The Printing, Packaging and Allied Trades Association. Engineering Report #5, 17pp.
- Wainwright L. 1967. An introduction to metrication for printers. The London Printer 2, pp. 74–77.
- Wainwright L. 1968. Changes to metric measures. The Penrose Annual 61, pp. 139–49.
- Wainwright L. 1969. For the technologist. Lithoprinter April, pp. 29–31.
- Wainwright L. 1969. Going metric: why the SI system will make things simpler, PIRA News #12, January.
- Wainwright L. 1971. Measurement of mechanical transmission errors in lithographic processes. PIRA/IARIGAI International Conference on Applied Lithographic Technology 1970. Chapter 19.

=== Dance articles ===
==== Ballroom Dancing Times & Dance Today ====
1956. Recent recordings. BDT vol 1 November p89
1960. Televiewing. BDT 5 November p76
1961. The Juniors take their turn. BDT 5 May p416
1963. Your first competition. BDT 6 June p466
1963. Heel turn. BDT 7 October p27
1963. Nerves! BDT 7 November p69
1963. Footwork. BDT 7 December p140
1964. Leg action. BDT 7 January p194
1964. Smile, please! BDT 7 February p260
1964. Knees. BDT 7 March p306
1964. Tackling the Tango. BDT 7 April p366
1964. Tango atmosphere. BDT 7 May p415
1964. Steps outside. BDT 7 July p537
1964. A word for the Ladies. BDT 7 August p604
1965. Your first competition. BDT 8, September p650
1965. The new competitor? BDT 9 July p524
1966. A question of judgement. BDT 10 January p183
1966. Calculating the marks. BDT 10 February p218
1966. What would Market Research find? BDT 10 July 502
1966. Competitions. BDT 10 September 646
1966. The IDMA – DTA merger. BDT 11 11 October
1967. Dancing and social change. BDT 11 January p168
1967. The influence of Professionals. BDT 11 February p185
1967. Here to stay. BDT 11 March

1981. Lyndon on Latin. BDT 29, February
1986. It's up to You. Dance Today 29 January p146
1986. Wasted opportunity. Dance Today 29 February p185
1986. Landmarks of memory. Dance Today 29 April p26
1986. Music and Dance. Dance Today 29 June p349
1992. Myself when young. Dance Today 36 October p28
1993. Liars, damn liars, and media critics. Dance Today 37 November

==== The Dance Teacher ====
1967. Prudent housekeeping. DT vol 16 November p. 9
1969. The case for a House Style. DT 18 February p. 29
1970. All this and ulcers too. DT 19 February p. 30
1970. IDTA Congress 1970. DT 19 September p. 168
1970. Eight fingers two thumbs. DT 19 October p. 195
1970. The Association charges. DT 19 November p. 218
1970. Day to day transactions. DT 19 December p. 244
1971. Decimal Quiz. DT 20 February, p. 31
1980. The Gulbenkian Report. DT 30 November
1981. Latin or Disco. DT 30 January
1982. Beatrice Bunny's Tale. DT 31 January (under non-de-plume Aesop Minimus)
1989. Youth dancing. DT 38 February, p. 47
1990. Community Charge. DT 39 May, p. 139
1990. Mystina. DT 39 November, p. 341
1991. Ballroom Teachers Committee I. DT 40 May, p. 154
1991. Ballroom Teachers Committee II. DT 40 June, p. 192
1991. Vocational qualifications. DT 40 December, p. 378
1992. Teachers' Competition. DT 41 May 167
1992. Ballroom Teachers Committee. DT 41 September, p. 29
1993. NVQs: Where are they now? DT 42 May p. 177
1993. Writing an article. DT 42 August p. 253
1994. Dance goes around & around. DT 43 March, p. 97
1994. Dance Schools. DT 43 April p. 155
1994. Education can be fun. DT 43 May, p. 191
1994. Straws in the wind. DT 43 June, p. 257
1994. The Superdance League. DT 43 November, p. 461
1995. NVQs The story continues DT 44 July, p.321
1995. Eulogy to Guy Howard DT 44 August, p. 368
1996. The Taxman Cometh DT 45 May, p. 229
1996. National Insurance contributions DT 45 June, p. 277
1998. Aspects of teaching dance DT 47 March, p. 81
1999. Children in the School DT 48 January, p. 9
1999. Burn the floor DT 48 July, p. 273
2000. Reaching the public DT 49 December, p. 517
2001. The nature of dance DT 50 March, p. 95
2001. Chided DT 50 October, p. 429

==== Other articles ====
- 1981. Scarborough upbringing. The Dalesman, October, p. 542
- 2002. The Youthscan Project: teenage attitudes to, and involvement in, dance.

== Links ==
- Official website
