= UKA Dance =

Dance teaching and examination board

- Abbreviation: UKA Dance
- Formation: 1902
- Purpose: Dance teaching and examination board
- Headquarters: Centenary House, 38–40 Station Road, Blackpool, FY4 1EU; UK
- CEO: David Roberts
- Affiliations: • British Dance Council • Council for Dance Education & Training
- Website: http://ukadance.co.uk/

UKA Dance, formally known as the United Kingdom Alliance (UKA), is a dance teaching and examination board based in Blackpool, England, and operates internationally. UKA Dance was established in 1902 and provides training in a range of dance styles, with examination syllabi for students, and training courses for people wishing to become certified dance teachers.

== Overview ==
UKA Dance exists primarily as a dance training and examination board.

For students, UKA Dance provides training opportunities with qualified dance teachers worldwide, both in private and mainstream dance education. Training is available in a wide range of dance disciplines, with examinations leading to a range of awards and certificates for successful candidates, including vocational examinations for students who wish to pursue a career in professional dance. Examinations and awards are available for a variety of ages and abilities.

UKA Dance also awards dance teaching qualifications and has a certification programme for dance students and professionals who wish to gain a recognised dance teaching qualification. There are three levels of qualification that certify teachers to enter candidates for examinations, they are Associate, Licentiate and Fellowship. Fellowship is the highest level of qualification and teachers who have reached this level may apply to become examiners.

UKA Dance are an awarding body validated by the Council for Dance Education and Training.

At UKA Dance, they assist dance teachers worldwide by providing their pupils with Achievement Awards for all ages & abilities, in all styles of Dance & Drama. They also provide Teaching Qualifications and help to encourage and support their members in all dance disciplines to establish and develop their business.

Corporate members of:

- British Dance Council
- Sport and Recreation Alliance
- Scottish Official Board of Highland Dancing

International Dance Supplies are the official supplier of all UKA dance wear.

Beyond dance training and examinations, UKA Dance is also one of the World's foremost organisations in the field of competitive dancing, and in this role organises numerous competitions, dance festivals and championships both in the UK and is influential in the regulation and adjudication of such competitions.

== Dance Styles ==
There are nine main faculties of UKA Dance:-

- Highland dance
- Streetdance
- Cheerdance
- Theatre Faculty
- Club Dance
- Ballroom & Latin
- Freestyle
- Rock 'n' Roll
- Classical Sequence (Sequence Dancing)

A range of examinations and awards are available in each dance discipline for children of all ages. These are typically organised into grades or medal tests, with the work being assessed by a UKA Dance registered examiner.

== Teaching Qualifications ==
As well as these examinations for children, the society also offers training for adults and teacher training for dance professionals who wish to become a registered teacher with UKA Dance.

The following three levels are different levels of qualified teachers and all are authorised to teach the UKA Dance syllabus and enter candidates for examinations:

- Associate (AUKA): A qualified teacher who has completed detailed study in the teaching of the Associate Syllabus for the relevant subject
- Licentiate (LUKA): A qualified teacher who has completed detailed study in the teaching of the Licentiate Syllabus for the relevant subject
- Fellowship (FUKA): A qualified teacher who has completed detailed study in the teaching of the Fellowship Syllabus for the relevant subject

A teacher who has achieved Fellowship status, can apply to become an examiner. Candidates who are successful in the selection process to become an examiner, then visit dance schools as a representative of the organisation, assessing pupils' dancing and providing feedback on how they can improve. They also provide feedback to the teachers, to ensure that standards are being maintained and that the syllabus is being correctly taught.

The UKA Dance Level 4 Diploma in Dance Teaching (UKADDT) will be introduced soon.

The UKADDT qualification is aimed at higher level dancers ages 18 plus who are wishing to progress into teaching, or established teachers wanting to teach in a wider range of vocational and further education settings. The diploma will provide a recognised and regulated framework to complement or start a teaching career.

== Presidents (Past and Present) ==
2025–2026 – Andrew Pigg

2023–2024 – Joan Martin

2019–2022 – Rhona Lawrence

2017–2018 – Joan Martin

2015–2016 – Ann Green

2013–2014 – Sue Burroughs

2012–2013 – Jackie Sanderson

2009–2011 – Ann Green

2009 – Paul Beeton (President Elect)

2007–2008 – Jackie Sanderson

2005–2006 – Ann Green

2003–2004 – Jackie Sanderson

2002 – David Roberts

2000–2001 – Ted Burroughs

1998–1999 – Sue Burroughs

1995–1997 – Ted Burroughs

1903-1904 – William Waymouth Rowe

== See also ==
- International Dance Teachers Association (IDTA)
- Royal Academy of Dance (RAD)
- British Association of Teachers of Dance (BATD)
- British Ballet Organization (BBO)
- National Association of Teachers of Dancing (NATD)
- Imperial Society of Teachers of Dancing (ISTD)
