= Paul Harris (choreographer) =

English choreographer

- Born: St. Helens, England
- Occupations: Choreographer dance teacher movement Director
- Website: paulharrisdance.com

Paul Harris is an English choreographer, dance teacher and movement director in film, television and theatre.

His notable works include the famous laser scenes for Catherine Zeta-Jones in the movie Entrapment, the BAFTA Award-winning Bleak House and the wand fight sequences in Harry Potter and the Order of the Phoenix. An interactive hologram of Harris is a permanent feature of the Warner Bros. Studios, Leavesden where Harris is described by Warner Bros. as being "the world's only wand combat choreographer".

In the theatre, he choreographed the 50th-anniversary production of John Osborne's The Entertainer at London's Old Vic. He is also an author of dance books, having written Salsa and Merengue – The Essential Step by Step Guide and several dance syllabi for British awarding bodies in dance. Harris is an acknowledged authority and leading choreographer in historical dance, period dance, tango, salsa, swing dance, ballroom dancing, Latin American dancing and theatre dance. He is the winner of the 2008 Carl Alan Award for choreography.

== Early career ==
Born in St Helens, Harris began dancing at the age of eight and as a dancer, was a successful Juvenile and Junior competitor in ballroom dancing. He won the British Open Championships at the Blackpool Dance Festival in both Ballroom and Latin American dancing, as well becoming 3 times English Champion, United Kingdom, International and West European Champion and placing in the first 3 of every major competition, including the World Championship as an adult.

On turning professional, he studied jazz dance, tap dancing, historical dance and classical ballet and won the British Exhibition (Theatre Arts) title. He retired from competitive dancing to study acting at the Academy of Live and Recorded Arts in London and on graduating, he played leading roles in British television and theatre, including major national tours of three West End productions. His roles during this period included A-Rab in West Side Story, Dill in To Kill a Mockingbird, Edmund in The Lion, the Witch and the Wardrobe, William H. Bonney in Billy The Kid, Scranton Slim in Guys and Dolls and Catsmeat in Snow White with the late Marti Caine.

In the 1990s, he played a role as a Latin American dance champion on the BBC television drama Casualty, for which he choreographed the dance sequences himself. This was spotted by a leading UK dance agent and led to his career in choreography.

=== As a choreographer ===
In 1997, Harris was asked to look at a script for a British movie with a view to choreographing the dance sequences. Following a single conversation with the director, he realised that combining his two backgrounds of dancing and acting was the direction in which he should take his career. Since then, Paul Harris has become one of the UK's most prolific choreographers and dance instructors in film and television. He has also been responsible for the choreography on several big budget movies, including Entrapment, Inkheart, The Other Boleyn Girl, Far From The Madding Crowd, Crooked House and he created the physical language and choreography for the wand-to-wand combat sequences in Harry Potter and the Order of the Phoenix.

Harris has also choreographed many of British television's most highly acclaimed, award-winning dramas of the last decade including Bleak House, The Way We Live Now, To the Ends of the Earth, Jane Eyre, Poirot, A Touch of Frost, William and Mary and six years as the choreographer for the hit UK comedy My Family starring Robert Lindsay. This led to Lindsay requesting that Harris be the choreographer of the 2007 critically acclaimed revival of John Osborne's The Entertainer. Other notable credits in theatre include being the choreographer of "Liberty", the first co-production of Shakespeare's Globe theatre and being a guest dance tutor for the Royal Shakespeare Company on Two Gentlemen of Verona, as well as choreographing productions such as A Family Affair, The Rivals, As You Like It and David Copperfield. He has continued to choreograph for television during this time, including dramas like Lost in Austen, Da Vinci's Demons and Call The Midwife.

Harris co-choreographed Disney's The Cheetah Girls 2 with its director Kenny Ortega, having been brought in at Ortega's request, specifically to choreograph the tango sequence which was shot in Barcelona. The tango Harris choreographed, was described by Ortega in a Dcom Extra interview, as "the most exciting and demanding dance sequence he had ever shot". Other notable directors he has worked with are Jon Amiel and David Yates, with whom Harris has worked four times. Among the notable actors Harris has created choreography for are Catherine Zeta-Jones, Scarlett Johansson, Gary Oldman, Sam Neill, Natalie Portman, Helena Bonham Carter and Ralph Fiennes.

=== Teaching ===
As a dance teacher, Harris has devised the dance module of the BA Hons (Acting) and MA (Acting)at four London drama schools. He is a dance tutor at The Actors Center in London and teaches dance at the Royal Central School of Speech and Drama (University of London), Mountview Academy of Theatre Arts (University of East Anglia) and the Italia Conti Academy of Theatre Arts (University of East London). He was the main dance coach in the "Kick boxer to Dancer" episode of the BAFTA-award-winning Faking It and he has coached and choreographed for world champions in showdance, salsa, ballroom dancing and Argentine tango including several of the professional dance teachers from British television's Strictly Come Dancing on which he has appeared.

Harris is a Fellow and Examiner of the United Kingdom Alliance of Professional Teachers of Dancing (UKA), as well as an Honorary member of the British Association of Teachers of Dancing (BATD). He also teaches internationally, particularly in South East Asia, where he has helped to develop dance in the Philippines, Indonesia and Thailand. In recognition of this work, Harris was made an Honorary Lifetime Member of the Philippine Professional Dance Teachers Association and he has appeared on as a guest dance expert on television in England and in Asia, to discuss choreography and dance styles as diverse as salsa, Argentine tango, Lindy Hop, West Coast Swing, historical dance and dancesport

He has adjudicated at many international dance championships, including the prestigious Blackpool Dance Festival and he is a licensed adjudicator with both the World DanceSport Federation and the World Dance Council

Salsa and Merengue – The Essential Step by Step Guide was written by Paul Harris and published in 1998. It is considered a definitive work of its kind in the dance industry and is the basis of the syllabi Harris has written in merengue, salsa and mambo, for the International Dance Teachers Association (IDTA), the British Association of Teachers of Dancing (BATD), the National Association of Teachers of Dancing (NATD) and the United Kingdom Alliance of Professional Teachers of Dancing (UKA). The book played a pivotal role in the history of salsa in the UK particularly in the formation of the (then) new Club Dance Division of the UKA. This development, for the first time, enabled teachers of salsa in Britain, to gain a recognised professional teaching qualification. In addition to this, Harris wrote the UKA's course guide for drama schools in 19th & 20th century social dance and co-founded their historical dance Faculty.

In 1996, Paul Harris founded London Theatre of Ballroom, during which they enjoyed a critically acclaimed six-month run at London's Café de Paris. They are dedicated to preserving and progressing ballroom dancing as performing art and their repertoire, choreographed entirely by Paul Harris, consists of shows based on swing dance, tango, Latin dancing, vintage dance and American smooth (Hollywood style partner dancing). They remain Britain's only ballroom based dance/theatre company.

== Works ==
=== Television dramas and films ===
Year	Type	Title	Production	Director
2018	Film	Patrick	Disney	Mandie Fletcher
2017	TV Drama	The Halycon	ITV	Stephen Woolfenden
2016	Film	Crooked House	Sony	Gilles Paquet-Brenner
2015	TV Comedy	Catherine Tate's Nan	ITV	Geoff Posner
2014	TV Drama	The Great Fire	ITV	Jonathan Jones
2014	Film	Far From The Madding Crowd	Fox Searchlight	Thomas Vinterberg
2013	TV Drama	Da Vinci's Demons	BBC / Starz US	David S. Goyer
2013	TV Drama	Call The Midwife	BBC	Juliet May
2012	TV Drama	The Paradise	BBC	David Drury
2011	TV Drama	Great Expectations	BBC	Brian Kirk
2011	TV Drama	South Riding	BBC	Diarmuid Lawrence
2009	TV Drama	Desperate Romantics	BBC	Diarmuid Lawrence
2009	TV Drama	Emma	BBC	Jim O'Hanlon
2008	Film	Inkheart	New Line Cinema	Iain Softley
2008	TV Dramas	Lost in Austen	ITV	Dan Zeff
2008	TV Dramas	Little Dorrit	BBC	Dearbhla Walsh
2008	TV Dramas	Miss Austen Regrets	BBC	Jeremy Lovering
2007	Film	Harry Potter and The Order of The Phoenix	Warner Bros.	David Yates
2008	Film	The Other Boleyn Girl	Sony Pictures	Justin Chadwick
2007	Film	Mister Lonely	O'Salvation Films	Harmony Korine
2007	Film	Love and Other Disasters	Skyline / Ruby Films	Alek Keshishian
2007	TV Dramas	Sense and Sensibility	BBC	John Alexander
2006	Film	Cheetah Girls 2	Disney	Kenny Ortega
2006	TV Dramas	Jane Eyre	BBC	Susanna White
2005	TV Dramas	Bleak House (BAFTA Winner 2006)	BBC	Justin Chadwick / S. White
2005	TV Dramas	To the Ends of the Earth	BBC	David Attwood
2005	TV Dramas	Poirot	Granada	Hettie MacDonald
2004	TV Dramas	The Quest II	YTV	David Jason
2003	TV Dramas	A Touch of Frost	YTV	Roger Bamford
2003	TV Dramas	William and Mary	Granada	Hettie MacDonald
2002	Film	Dream Thief	Salad Films	Nicola Levinsky
2001	TV Dramas	The Way We Live Now (BAFTA Winner 2002)	BBC	David Yates
2000	Film	Trick of the Light	Zephyr Films / Film 4	Teresa McCann
2000	TV Dramas	The Sins	BBC	David Yates
2000	TV Dramas	My Family (2003–2008)	BBC	Dewi Humphreys
1999	Film	Entrapment	20th Century Fox	Jon Amiel
1998	Film	The Tichborne Claimant	The Bigger Picture Co.	David Yates

=== TV features, reality shows and appearances ===
Title	TV Network	Director
Harry Potter Studio Tour (Permanent Hologram)	Warner Bros.	Laura Watson
The Supersizers Go (1920s Dance Consultant)	BBC	Kate Scholefield
Faking It (mentor) (BAFTA winner 2002 & 2003)	Channel 4	Jonathan Smith
Gloria Hunniford's Open House (Salsa Feature)	Channel 5	Personal appearance
Granada Reports – Look North (Salsa feature)	ITV	Personal appearance
11th Hour (Tango and Swing feature)	ITV	Personal appearance

=== Theatre ===
Title	Theatre	Director
The Entertainer	Old Vic	Sean Holmes
Gaslight (Period Movement Coach)	Old Vic	Peter Gill
The Importance of Being Ernest	Theatre Royal Bath	Peter Gill
Liberty	Globe	Guy Retallack
Romeo and Juliet	Oxford Shakespeare Co.	Guy Retallack
Two Gentlemen of Verona (Dance Coach)	Royal Shakespeare Co.	Fiona Buffini
Flight of the Swan (Movement Coach)	Royal Opera House (Linbury)	Rob Swain
A Family Affair	Theatre Royal Bath No.1 Tour	Andy De La Tour
Wallflowering	National Tour	Jennie Darnell
Tommy	Royal Academy of Music	Guy Retallack
A Christmas Carol	Bridge House Theatre	Guy Retallack
As You Like It	Central	Martin Wylde
Redemption Over Hammersmith Broadway	LAMDA	Max Key
Jerusalem	Mountview	Max Key
Dancing at Lughnasa	Mountview	Andrew Jarvis
The Rivals	Mountview	Glen Walford
The American Clock	Mountview	Sean McLevy
David Copperfield	ALRA	Stuart Wood
Mill on the Floss	ALRA	Janette Smith
Erpingham Camp	ALRA	Finetime Fontayne

=== Commercials and music videos ===
Title	Production	Director
My Name (McLean)	Atlantic Records	Nick Bartleet
Grease is the Word	ITV Creative	Simon Mitchell
Trafalgar Square Big Dance	British Tourist Authority	Michael Geigan

=== Stage and trade shows ===
Year	Title	Production	Director
2004	Fox Promotional Screen Test at Cannes Film Festival	20th Century Fox and Stella Artois	Geraldine Maloney
2002	London Boat Show	Sealine	Paul Harris
1999	London Boat Show	Sealine	Paul Harris
1998–2006	Miss Philippine	Alfanti Productions	Paul Harris
1997	Miss China	CNE	Peter Chen
1997	The Delfont Awards	Grosvenor Productions	Alex Clayton
	The Half Monty	Inch High Productions	Paul Harris and Warwick Davis
