= London 1950 =

London 1950 may refer to:

- London International Stamp Exhibition 1950
- London Nationals (1950–), a Canadian junior ice hockey team
- London Ski jumping competition 1950 & 1951
- 1950 World Ice Hockey Championships, held in London
- 1950 World Figure Skating Championships, held in London
- 1950 FA Cup Final, held in London

== See also ==
- London
- 1950 in the United Kingdom
