= EADA =

EADA can refer to:

- English amateur dancesport association ltd
- Executive Assistant District Attorney
- EADA Business School
