= International Dance Teachers Association =

International Dance Teachers' Association
- Abbreviation: IDTA
- Formation: Founded: 1903; Incorporated: 1967
- Legal status: Private limited company (Ltd)
- Purpose: Dance education and examination board
- Headquarters: International House; 76 Bennett Road; Brighton; BN2 5JL; United Kingdom
- Region served: UK and Worldwide
- Main organ: Board of Directors
- Affiliations: • British Dance Council • Council for Dance Education & Training • Central Council for Physical Recreation • Theatre Dance Council International
- Website: www.idta.co.uk

The International Dance Teachers Association (IDTA) is a dance teaching and examination board based in Brighton, England. Operating internationally, the IDTA currently has over 5,000 members in 57 countries. The IDTA is recognised by the national qualifications regulators in England and Wales, Ofqual and the Council for Dance Education and Training, and is also affiliated to the British Dance Council, the Central Council of Physical Recreation and the Theatre Dance Council International. The IDTA works in partnership with the Royal Academy of Dance. The IDTA publishes a print and online magazine for members titled Dance International four times a year.

== History ==
The International Dance Teachers Association was formed in 1967 as the result of a merger between the Dance Teachers' Association (DTA), and the International Dancing Masters Association (IDMA). Both of these organisations were formed from the merging of older dance teaching associations, with the earliest being established in 1903. The IDTA subsequently celebrated its centenary in 2003.

The earliest predecessor of IDTA was the Manchester and Salford Association of Teachers of Dancing, founded in 1903. This later became known as the Empire Society, (ESTD), in 1938. In 1920, another group of teachers in Birmingham formed the Midland Association of Teachers of Dancing (MATD), which eventually merged with the Empire Society in 1961 to form the Dance Teachers' Association.

In the early post-World War I years, a number of other small dance organisations were formed: the English Dancing Masters Association (EDMA), the Premier Association of Teachers of Dancing (PATD), the Universal Association of Dane Teachers (UADT), and the Yorkshire Association of Dancing Masters (YADM). These four organisations merged in 1930 to form the International Dancing Masters' Association.

After their merger in 1967, the organization was renamed the International Dance Teachers' Association.

== Notable people ==
=== Ballroom branch ===
- Walter Laird – Former dancer and teacher of Latin American Dance and author of "Technique of Latin American Dancing"
- Len Goodman – Former Ballroom Dance Champion, now a teacher, examiner and adjudicator. Goodman was head judge on the BBC1 series Strictly Come Dancing from its inception in 2004 until he retired from the position in 2016. He also judged on the American equivalent series Dancing With The Stars.

=== Theatre branch ===
- Deborah Bull, Baroness Bull – Former Principal dancer with The Royal Ballet. Studied IDTA prior to joining the Royal Ballet School
- Vanessa Hooper – Former dancer with the Royal Ballet and Northern Ballet Theatre. Senior examiner of the IDTA and dance tutor for the television series Ladette to Lady
- Jennifer Ellison – British actress and model, who won titles at the IDTA Theatre Dance Championships in 1996 and 1997, later training at the Royal Ballet Lower School
- Kevin O'Hare – Studied IDTA and at the Royal Ballet School. Danced with Birmingham Royal Ballet and The Royal Ballet and is now Director of The Royal Ballet

=== Honorary members ===
- Arlene Phillips was admitted as an honorary member of the IDTA in 2006, in recognition of her work in the field of dance. Phillips is credited with the creation of 70s dance troupe Hot Gossip, and is the renowned choreographer of award-winning West End and Broadway musicals including The Sound Of Music, Starlight Express, Grease, Saturday Night Fever and We Will Rock You. She is most famous today as a judge for television talent shows, such as Strictly Come Dancing and So You Think You Can Dance.
- Ken Dodd was admitted as an honorary member of the IDTA in recognition of his contribution to the entertainments industry. Dodd who died in 2018 was a well-known British comedian, most famous for traditional music hall style entertainment, although he also appeared in drama and was a songwriter.
- Rosemarie Ford is a well-known British television personality from the 1990s, particularly recognised as Bruce Forsyth's co-presenter of The Generation Game. Rosemarie Poundford, to give her full name, trained as a dancer with an IDTA teacher from a young age and in 1978, won the prestigious title of "Miss Dance of Great Britain". In 1998, she performed the role of 'Bombalurina' for the official film production of Andrew Lloyd Webber's musical "Cats".

== See also ==
- UKA Dance
- British Association of Teachers of Dance (BATD)
- British Ballet Organization (BBO)
- Imperial Society of Teachers of Dancing (ISTD)
- National Association of Teachers of Dancing (NATD)
- Royal Academy of Dance (RAD)
