= Diane Barron =

British ballroom dancer

- Years active: 1953–

Diane Barron is a professional ballroom dancer and dance teacher. She now teaches ballroom dancing in Bristol.

Diane started dancing in 1953, and turned professional in 1962, reaching the finals of the British Championships a number of times. In her early years she trained with Frank and Peggy Spencer, before moving on to teach at the Spencers' school in Penge.

Diane was the president of the British Association of Teachers of Dance from 2001 to 2005.
