= Dancewave =

Dance education organization

Dancewave is a dance education organization based in Brooklyn, New York City, with approximately 4000 youth and adult dancers. Founded in 1995 by Diane Jacobowitz, it offers both merit-based and need-based scholarship funding.

== History ==
In 1995, Dancewave's founder Diane Jacobowitz, began hosting the Kids Cafe Festival. The festival produced works by and for children. As the Kids Cafe Festival grew in popularity, a youth dance company was established in 2001.

== The Dancewave Center ==
In September 2017, Dancewave broke ground on its new location at 182 Fourth Avenue, Brooklyn. The 3,600-square-foot facility would be nearly triple the size of its old location at 45 Fourth Avenue. The $5.2 million project has received $4.8 million from New York City Council, the Mayor's Office through the New York City Department of Cultural Affairs (DCLA), and the Brooklyn Borough President's Office. The Studio Joseph's architectural design converts the current industrial space into a LEED-certified arts facility, with two dance studios that open to a performance space with the capacity for 100 occupants. The facility opened in June 2019.

== Dancewave School ==
Dancewave offers year-round dance programming for youth and adults in a wide range of techniques and genres including Creative Movement, Ballet, Modern, Hip Hop, Barre Vida, Broadway Stars, Contemporary Jazz, and Zumba.

== Dancewave Company Program ==
The pre-professional Dancewave Company provides opportunities for young dancers, ages 7–18, to work with internationally acclaimed artists such as Paul Taylor, Twyla Tharp, Bill T. Jones, Garth Fagan, Mark Morris, Lar Lubovitch, and more. The Dancewave Company has been featured on PBS and the Jimmy Fallon Show and has numerous performance accolades including the Jacob's Pillow Dance Festival, and the 2010 Aberdeen International Youth Festival in Scotland.

In 2012 Dancewave launched Dancing Through College and Beyond, a free career and college readiness event for high school students offering classes, panels, auditions and scholarships.

== See also ==
- List of dance organizations
