= British Sequence Championships =

Ballroom dancing championships held in England

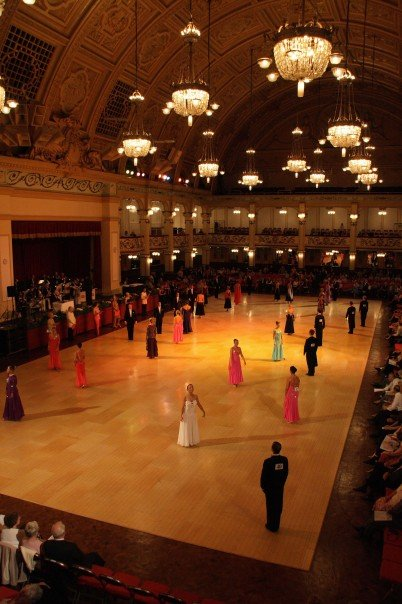
A photo taken of the 2007 British Sequence Championships, held in the Empress ballroom, Winter Gardens, Blackpool.

The British Sequence Championships are ballroom dancing championships for adults and children held annually in Blackpool, England.

The championships for adults take place as part of the Blackpool Sequence Dance Festival and have been running since 1949. They are held in the Empress Ballroom at the Winter Gardens in Blackpool. Dancers compete in up to five sequence dances determined by the organiser each year for the titles. The British Championship is seen as the highlight of the year, not only because it is "one of the country's most prestigious titles", but also due to the grandeur of the location.

The Blackpool Sequence Dance Festival incorporates a popular competition day for children on Saturday, followed by inventive competitions for professionals and the British Sequence Championships for Professional, Amateur Classical Sequence (previously "Old Time"), Amateur Modern Sequence, Senior Classical Sequence and Under 21s Classical Sequence. The championship events are granted by the British Dance Council and are run under their rules. The festival celebrated its 60th year in 2009.

Entrants to the Championships predominantly come from Great Britain, although many Irish dance schools have attended the festival over the years. Entrants have also come from as far away as Japan and Australia.

The British Sequence Championships for children takes place as part of the Blackpool Junior Dance Festival, running since 1947. They start on Easter Monday each year and run for a week. Until 2010, when increasing numbers prompted a move to the Empress Ballroom, they had been held at the Tower Ballroom in Blackpool Tower. The events incorporate the Juvenile Classical Sequence Championship, the Junior Classical Sequence Championship and the Junior Modern Sequence Championship.

Famous entrants to the championships include a young Cheryl Cole and former World Amateur Ballroom Champion Jonathan Crossley with partner Kylie Jones.

== British Amateur Sequence Champions ==
Year	Classical Champions	Runner up	3rd	Modern Champions	Runner up	3rd
2025	Robert Lem, Keeley Morris	Thomas Winter, Anna Duncan	Evan O'Dea & Lula-Belle Findlay	Thomas Winter, Anna Duncan	Evan O'Dea & Lula-Belle Findlay	Nicholas Wilson & Livy Bradfield
2024	Josh O'Conchorsley, Grace Phipps	Alex Gilberthorpe, Sophie Martin	Curtis Watson, Alexandra Parry	Thomas Winter, Anna Duncan	Josh O'Conchorsley, Grace Phipps	Curtis Watson, Alexandra Parry
2023	Harry Smith-Hampton, Emma Walker	Alex Gilberthorpe, Sophie Martin	Josh O'Conchorsley, Grace Phipps	Harry Smith-Hampton, Emma Walker	Josh O'Conchorsley, Grace Phipps	
2022	Harry Smith-Hampton, Emma Walker	Robert Lem, Keeley Marie Morris	Josh Horsley, Grace Phipps	Harry Smith-Hampton, Emma Walker	Cameron Robinson, Viktoriia Breus	Josh Horsley, Grace Phipps
2021	Lewis Frobisher, Kate Bodill	Harry Smith-Hampton, Emma Walker	Joshua Horsley, Grace Phipps	Lewis Frobisher, Kate Bodill	Harry Smith-Hampton, Emma Walker	Joshua Horsley, Grace Phipps
2019	Lewis Frobisher, Kate Bodill	Harry Smith-Hampton, Emma Walker	Elliot Walker, Lauren Proctor	Lewis Frobisher, Kate Bodill	Harry Smith-Hampton, Emma Walker	Elliot Walker, Lauren Proctor
2018	Lewis Frobisher, Kate Bodill	Harry Smith-Hampton, Hannah Bulman	Emma Gough, Jemma Davies	Lewis Frobisher, Kate Bodill	Harry Smith-Hampton, Hannah Bulman	Emma Gough, Jemma Davies
2017	Lewis Frobisher, Kate Bodill	Harry Smith-Hampton, Hannah Bulman	Jemma Davies, Emma Gough	Lewis Frobisher, Kate Bodill	Harry Smith-Hampton, Hannah Bulman	Jemma Davies, Emma Gough
2016	Liam Pywell, Alexandra Stainton	Cameron Hutson, Claire Brennan	Jemma Davies & Emma Gough	Liam Pywell, Alexandra Stainton	Cameron Hutson, Claire Brennan	Harry Smith-Hampton & Hannah Bulman
2015	Liam Pywell, Alexandra Stainton	Cameron Hutson, Claire Brennan	Meghan Christie, Alex Lambert	Cameron Hutson, Claire Brennan	Simon Hartland, Natalie Cuomo	Liam Pywell, Alexandra Stainton
2014	Liam Pywell, Alexandra Stainton	Meghan Christie, Alex Lambert	Simon Hartland, Natalie Cuomo	Tyrone Thiara, Kateryna Iaritenko	Liam Pywell, Alexandra Stainton	Simon Hartland, Natalie Cuomo
2013	Liam Pywell, Alexandra Stainton	Andrew Davies, Chloe Helmore	Daniel Cretney, Georgia Wilkins	Tyrone Thiara, Jasmine Stickley	Adam Bynert, Emily Bynert	Ian Whyatt, Leah-Marie Hill
2012	Philip Rawcliffe, Hannah Roberts	Adam Bynert, Emily Bynert	Liam Pywell, Alexandra Stainton	Philip Rawcliffe, Hannah Roberts	Adam Bynert, Emily Bynert	Ian Whyatt, Leah-Marie Hill
2011	Luke Shepherd, Joanne Pearson	Philip Rawcliffe, Hannah Roberts	Andrew Davies, Jazzmyne Luke	Philip Rawcliffe, Hannah Roberts	Andrew Davies, Jazzmyne Luke	James Chew, Sophie Chilton
2010	Martin Bird, Sarah Ward Jones	Marcus Mitchell, Lily Plowman	Luke Shepherd, Joanne Pearson	Marcus Mitchell, Lily Plowman	Philip Rawcliffe, Hannah Roberts	James Chew, Sophie Chilton
2009	Callam Thomson, Sophie Thomson	Martin Bird, Sarah Ward Jones	Marcus Mitchell, Lily Plowman	Callam Thomson, Sophie Thomson	Marcus Mitchell, Lily Plowman	Martin Bird, Sarah Ward Jones
2008	Callam Thomson, Sophie Thomson	Martin Bird, Sarah Ward Jones	Scott Hanson, Vicky Lentle	Callam Thomson, Sophie Thomson	Martin Bird, Sarah Ward Jones	Scott Hanson, Vicky Lentle
2007	Martin Bird, Gemma Clunie	Scott Hanson, Vicky Lentle	Callam Thomson, Sophie Thomson	Martin Bird, Gemma Clunie	Callam Thomson, Sophie Thomson	Scott Hanson, Vicky Lentle
2006	Lee Godwin, Amy Turner	Martin Bird, Gemma Clunie	Adam Duffie, Joanne Pearson	Martin Bird, Gemma Clunie	Lee Godwin, Amy Turner	Callam Thomson, Hayley Telfer
2005	Lee Godwin, Amy Turner	Martin Bird, Gemma Clunie	Scott Hanson, Vicky Lentle	Lee Godwin, Amy Turner	Martin Bird, Gemma Clunie	Scott Hanson, Vicky Lentle
2004	Richard Finlow, Natalie Hill			Richard Finlow, Natalie Hill		
2003	Neil Bradfield, Tara Harrison			Neil Bradfield, Tara Harrison		
2002	Neil Bradfield, Tara Harrison			Neil Bradfield, Tara Harrison		
2001	Craig Bedwell, Angela Painting			Craig Bedwell, Angela Painting		
2000	Craig Bedwell, Angela Painting	Jonathan Luckcuck, Natalie Hill		Craig Bedwell, Angela Painting	Jonathan Luckcuck, Natalie Hill	
1999	Craig Bedwell, Angela Painting			Craig Bedwell, Angela Painting		
1998	Mr P Jenkins, Miss E Williamson	Mr C Bedwell, Miss A Painting	Mr P Painting, Miss E Hanson	Mr P Jenkins, Miss E Williamson	Mr C Bedwell, Miss A Painting	Mr P Painting, Miss E Hanson
1997	Mr P Maddison, Miss N Cope			Mr P Maddison, Miss N Cope		
1996	Mr R Finnegan, Miss J Lloyd			Mr A Billingham, Miss S Jeanne		
1995	Mr R Finnegan, Miss J Lloyd			Mr R Finnegan, Miss J Lloyd		
1994	Mr A Hibberd, Miss J Grew			Mr P Blackburn, Miss H Blackburn		
1993	Mr D Park, Miss A Kilgour			Mr A Hibberd, Miss J Grew		
1992	Mr M O'Callaghan, Miss E Dodds			Mr D Park, Miss A Kilgour		
1991	Mr M Habergham, Miss R Simpson			Mr R Paull, Miss L Smallman		
1990	Mr M Burke and Miss M Burke			Mr R Paull, Miss L Smallman		
1989	Mr and Mrs G Ryan			Mr M Luttinen, Miss C Jones		
1988	Mr R Heppenstall, Miss M Prigmore			Mr M Habergham, Miss R Simpson	Mr M O’Callaghan Miss E Dodds	Mr K Nicholls Miss A Evans
1987	Mr R Heppenstall, Miss M Prigmore			Mr M Burke, Miss M Burke		
1986	Mr and Mrs G Court			Mr G Ryan, Miss J Perry		
1985	Mr M Paton, Miss J Davies			Mr P Schrauwen, Miss T Thornton		
1984	Mr M Paton, Miss J Davies	Mr G Court, Miss A Stokes	P Schrauwen, Miss T Thornton	Mr M Paton, Miss J Davies	P Schrauwen, Miss T Thornton	Mr G Ryan Miss S Redmond
1983	Mr J Tebb, Miss J Harris			Mr G Tierney, Miss A Powell		
1982	Mr J Tebb, Miss J Harris			Mr and Mrs P Ainsley		
1981	Mr I Cairns, Miss T Shiner	Mr J Rainey Miss K Simmonds	Mr J Tebb Miss J Harris	Mr and Mrs P Ainsley	Mr J Tebb Miss J Harris	Mr M Paton Miss J Davis
1980	Mr G Thomson, Miss P Stokes	Mr I Cairns Miss T Shiner	M Mclean Mrs J McLean	Mr M Habergham, Miss M Prigmore		
1979	Mr S Baish, Miss K Boote			Mr and Mrs M McLean		
1978	Mr S Baish, Miss K Boote			Mr and Mrs M McLean		
1977	Mr J M Hugh, Miss D Neilson			Mr and Mrs M McLean		
1976	Mr and Mrs T W Packard	Mr P J Wilkes Miss T Matthews	Mr J M Haigh Miss D Nielsen	Mr J Millar, Miss A Little (1st championship)	Mr M Mclean Miss J Bailey	Mr G Thompson Miss P Stokes
1975	Mr and Mrs T W Packard	Mr & Mrs G Y Yeomans	Mr P J Wilkes Miss T Matthews			
1974	Mr and Mrs B Earnshaw					
1973	Mr G Waite, Miss K Pople					
1972	Mr G Waite, Miss K Pople	Mr Ian Cuerden ,Miss Doreen Lowe				
1971	Mr and Mrs J Bignell					
1970	Mr N Monk, Miss C Richards					
1969	Mr R J Walford, Miss M Gane					
1968	Mr A P Harley, Miss C A Knott					
1967	Mr A P Harley, Miss C A Knott					
1966	Mr and Mrs G Watkins					
1965	Mr and Mrs G Watkins					
1964	Mr N R Boswell, Miss A M Parkinson					
1963	Mr L T Norton, Miss C Wightman					
1962	Mr L T Norton, Miss C Wightman					
1961	Mr D Tonks, Miss B Bates					
1960	Mr D Tonks, Miss B Bates					
1959	Mr and Mrs B Elsdon					
1958	Mr L Norton, Miss S V Billington					
1957	Mr D Young, Miss S Buckley					
1956	Mr D Young, Miss S Buckley					
1955	Mr and Mrs J R Briggs					
1954	Mr and Mrs Blanchard					
1953	Mr and Mrs E Bird					
1952	Mr and Mrs E Bird					
1951	Mr and Mrs A Wellings					
1950	Mr and Mrs A Wellings					
1949	Mr and Mrs J Stead					
1948	Mr and Mrs J Stead					
1947	Mr and Mrs J Stead					
1946	Mr and Mrs W Francis (1st championship)					

== British Under 21s, Professional and Senior Sequence Champions ==
Year	Under 21s	Professional	Senior
2025	Evan O'Dea & Lula-Belle Findlay	-	Roger & Annette Griss
2024	Curtis Watson, Alexandra Parry	-	Roger & Annette Griss
2023	Lucy Morse, Lauren Foy	Henry Beale, Freja Smith	Roger & Annette Griss
2022	Henry Beale, Freja Smith	-	Roger & Annette Griss
2021	Henry Beale, Freja Smith	Michael Hodgson, Deborah Jones (Competition)	Roger & Annette Griss
2019	Harry Smith-Hampton, Emma Walker	Callam Thomson, Leah-Marie Hill	Paul Watkins, Janette Fletcher
2018	Lewis Frobisher, Kate Bodill	-	Paul Watkins, Janette Fletcher
2017	Lewis Frobisher, Kate Bodill	-	Paul Watkins, Janette Fletcher
2016	Harry Smith-Hampton, Hannah Bulman	-	Adrian Hibberd, Sharon Alflatt
2015	Daniel Lyle, Chelsea Lyle (competition)	Luke Shepherd, Sophie Mackay	Adrian Hibberd, Sharon Alflatt
2014	Meghan Christie, Alex Lambert (competition)	Andrew Davies, Clare Rushby	Adrian Hibberd, Sharon Alflatt
2013	Jemma Davies, Emma Gough	Martin & Sarah Bird	Adrian Hibberd, Sharon Alflatt
2012	Adam Bynert, Emily Bynert	Martin & Sarah Bird	Stuart Rowley, Diane Palmer
2011	James Chew, Sophie Chilton	Neil & Tara Bradfield	Stuart Rowley, Diane Palmer
2010	Philip Rawcliffe, Hannah Roberts	-	Stuart Rowley, Diane Palmer
2009	Marcus Mitchell, Lily Plowman	No competition	Stuart Rowley, Diane Palmer
2008	Callam Thomson, Sophie Thomson	Craig Bedwell, Angela Painting	Brian Marshall, Lynn Marshall
2007	Callam Thomson, Sophie Thomson	No competition	Brian Marshall, Lynn Marshall
2006	Scott Hanson, Vicky Lentle	Craig Bedwell, Angela Painting	Lee Ash, Linda Ash
2005	Scott Hanson, Vicky Lentle	Craig Bedwell, Angela Painting	Robert Hall, Diane Black
2004	Lee Godwin, Amy Turner	Craig Bedwell, Angela Painting	Mr and Mrs P Whithey-Tebby
2003	Mr L Godwin, Miss H Dobbins	No competition	Mr and Mrs D Fellows
2002	Mr A Mollart, Miss C Latter	No competition	Mr and Mrs D Fellows
2001	Mr A Mollart, Miss C Latter	Darren Park, Kelly Williams	Mr and Mrs D Fellows
2000	Mr L Penaluna, Miss V Carruthers (competition)	Mr M Habergham, Miss J Burnett	Mr and Mrs J Bruss
1999	No competition	No competition	Mr and Mrs J Bruss
1998	Mr C Park, Miss N Bloxham	Mr A Billingham, Miss Z Smith	Mr and Mrs J Bruss
1997	Mr N Bradfield, Miss T Harrison	Philip Blackburn, Helen Blackburn	Mr D Roberts, Miss G Ferns O'Conner
1996	Mr C Bedwell, Miss A Painting	Darren Park, Sharon McCann	Mr D Roberts, Miss G Ferns O'Conner
1995	Mr R Finlow, Miss E Smith	Darren Park, Andrea Kilgour	Mr D Roberts, Miss G Ferns O'Conner
1994	Mr A Billingham, Miss E Edwards	Darren Park, Andrea Kilgour	Mr and Mrs J Thorne
1993	Mr G Allen, Miss S Jephcote	Mr and Mrs R Heppenstall	Mr and Mrs J Thorne
1992	Mr R Finnigan, Miss J Lloyd	Mr R Heppenstall, Miss M Prigmore	Mr and Mrs T Dibble
1991	Mr D Park, Miss A Kilgour	Mr M Paton, Miss J Davies	Mr and Mrs T Dibble
1990	Mr R Paull, Miss L Smallman	Mr M Paton, Miss J Davies	Mr and Mrs T Dibble
1989	Mr P Blackburn, Miss S Ward	Mr B Jones, Miss E Starkey	Mr and Mrs T Dibble
1988	Mr M Herring, Miss D Crossley	Mr B Jones, Miss E Starkey	Mr and Mrs S Simner
1987	Mr P Keough, Miss K Farrelly (1st championship)	Mr B Jones, Miss E Starkey	Mr and Mrs S Simner
1986	Mr M O'Callaghan, Miss E Dodds	Mr B Jones, Miss E Starkey	Mr and Mrs S Simner
1985	Mr M Burke, Miss M Burke	Mr and Mrs W Packard	Mr and Mrs S Gregg
1984	Mr M Woolley, Miss K Taylor	Mr and Mrs W Packard	Mr and Mrs T Kane
1983		Mr and Mrs W Packard	Mr and Mrs J Lincoln
1982		Mr and Mrs W Packard	Mr and Mrs J Lincoln
1981	Mr A Warwick, Miss J Swaine	Mr and Mrs G Waite	Mr and Mrs S Stewart
1980	Mr N Ashton and Miss D Cooper	Mr and Mrs G Waite	Mr and Mrs A Farrell
1979		Mr and Mrs B Earnshaw	Mr and Mrs A Farrell
1978		Mr and Mrs B Earnshaw	Mr and Mrs K Baron
1977	Mr M Elly, Miss J Whitehead	Mr G Waite, Miss J Pople	Mr and Mrs K Baron
1976	Mr S Baish, Miss K Boote	Mr G Waite, Miss J Pople	Mr and Mrs R V Wilson
1975		Mr and Mrs R Muldoon	Mr and Mrs R V Wilson
1974		Mr J Hall, Miss D Mayo	Mr and Mrs R McInnes
1973		Mr J Hall, Miss D Mayo	Mr and Mrs R McInnes
1972		Mr and Mrs R Walford	Mr K Williams, Mrs E Edwards
1971		Mr and Mrs R Walford	Mr K Williams, Mrs E Edwards
1970		Mr and Mrs G Watkins	Mr S Wright, Miss K Keelan
1969		Mr and Mrs G Watkins	Mr S Wright, Miss K Keelan
1968		Mr and Mrs G Watkins	Mr S Wright, Miss K Keelan
1967		Mr and Mrs D C Stead	Mr and Mrs F Westbrook
1966		Mr D Young, Miss S Buckley	Mr and Mrs F Westbrook
1965		Mr D Young, Miss S Buckley	Mr and Mrs E Holroyd (1st championship)
1964		Mr D Young, Miss S Buckley	
1963		Mr K Park, Miss M Whiteside	
1962		Mr K Park, Miss M Whiteside	
1961		Mr and Mrs J R Briggs	
1960		Mr and Mrs J R Briggs	
1959		Mr J Rigby, Mrs F Newbegin	
1958		Mr J Rigby, Mrs F Newbegin	
1957		Mr J Rigby, Mrs F Newbegin	
1956		Mr M Fletcher, Miss M Burrows	
1955		Mr A Halford, Miss M Robinson	
1954		Tie: Mr A Halford, Miss M Robinson and Mr R Stanley, Miss J Keeler	
1953		Mr R Stanley, Miss J Keeler	
1952		Mr H Hulley, Miss D Edwards	
1951		Mr H Hulley, Miss D Edwards (1st championship)	

== Juvenile and Junior British Champions ==
Year	Juvenile Classical Sequence	Junior Classical Sequence	Junior Modern Sequence
2026	Amy Bird, Ella-Mae Thomas	Joseph Delaney, Amelie Jackson	Joseph Delaney, Amelie Jackson
2025	Emilie Pope, Sophia Giles	Evan O'Dea, Lula-Belle Findlay	Evan O'Dea, Lula-Belle Findlay
2024	Ellsie Flounders, Melanie Gibbs	Evan O'Dea, Lula-Belle Findlay	Evan O'Dea, Lula-Belle Findlay
2023	Joseph Delaney, Amelie Jackson	Evan O'Dea, Lula-Belle Findlay	Evan O'Dea, Lula-Belle Findlay
2022	Ethan Cadman, Poppy Walker	Curtis Watson, Alexandra Parry	Curtis Watson, Alexandra Parry
2021	Tomasz Kocimski, Chantel Chen	Henry Beale, Freja Smith	Henry Beale, Freja Smith
2019	Tomasz Kocimski, Ruby Galbraith	Scott Horne, Claudia Lewthwaite	Scott Horne, Claudia Lewthwaite
2018	Cassidy Allen, Lily Morgan	Daniel Smith, Megan Croft	Daniel Smith, Megan Croft
2017	Jodie-Leigh Weller, Ava Gregson	Scott Wilson, Emily Brown	Scott Wilson, Emily Brown
2016	Scott Horne, Claudia Lewthwaite	Scott Wilson, Emily Brown	Scott Wilson, Emily Brown
2015	Abbie Ross, Eleanor Bage	Scott Wilson, Emily Brown	Scott Wilson, Emily Brown
2014	Scarlett Houston, Sadie Quinn	Harry Eyre, Amber Brunton	Harry Eyre, Amber Brunton
2013	Scott Wilson, Emily Brown	Carly Goldsborough, Danielle Forster	Georgia Wilkins, Leoni Maltby
2012	Lewis Frobisher, Georgia Aspinall	Jordan-Marie Storey, Leah-Marie Hill	Jordan-Marie Storey, Leah-Marie Hill
2011	Lewis Frobisher, Georgia Aspinall	Jordan-Marie Storey, Leah-Marie Hill	Jordan-Marie Storey, Leah-Marie Hill
2010	Georgia Wilkins, Leoni Maltby	Adam Bynert, Emily Howarth	Adam Bynert, Emily Howarth
2009	Georgia Wilkins, Leoni Maltby	James Chew, Georgia Carr	James Chew, Georgia Carr
2008	Jordan-Marie Storey, Leah-Marie Hill	Andrew Davies, Rachel Pipe	Kristopher Turner, Hannah Cartern
2007	Stephen Rodgers, Grace Warren	Chloe Vincent, Jade Ward	Emily Bynert, Sophie Thomson
2006	Laura Rapley, Laura Hollies	Josh Dobbins, Lauren Storey	Josh Dobbins, Lauren Storey
2005	Samantha McNally, Sophie Vincent	Callam Thomson, Christina Francotte	Callam Thomson, Christina Francotte
2004	Andrew Davies, Rachael Pipe	Adam Duffie, Joanne Pearson	Callam Thomson, Christina Francotte
2003	Emily Bynert, Sophie Thomson	Adam Duffie, Joanne Pearson	Adam Duffie, Joanne Pearson
2002	Hannah Leggett, Megan Tebb	Ashley Godfrey, Emily Dickerson	Ashley Godfrey, Emily Dickerson
2001	Jessica Bynert, Leigh-Anne Barrowclough	Adam Mollart, Clare Latter	Adam Mollart, Clare Latter
2000	Joanne Pearson, Rachael Gray	Adam Mollart, Clare Latter	Adam Mollart, Clare Latter
1999	Louise Lane, Melissa Ryland	Lee Penaluna, Samantha Dyde	Lee Penaluna, Samantha Dyde
1998	Samantha Markland, Georgina Day	Lee Penaluna, Susan Harris	Alan O’Brien, Lora Dolan
1997	Adam Mollart, Clare Latter	Christopher Park, Kelly Williams	Paul Latimer, Nicola Bloxham
1996	Helen Alexander, Lucy Palmer	Paul Penaluna, Ceri Parker	Lee Dudman, Rachel Turnball
1995	Paul Johnson, Louise Hurmson	Darren Clowes, Tara Harrison	Darren Clowes, Tara Harrison
1994	Alan O'Brien, Laura Dolan	Craig Bedwell, Angela Painting	Gary O'Brien, Joanne McKeown
1993	Stephanie Bailey, Gemma Bynert	Thomas Bowen, Anwen Paull	Thomas Bowen, Anwen Paull
1992	Paul McCann, Laura O'Brien	Thomas Bowen, Nicola Cope	Marc O'Conner, Linda McCann
1991	Paul McCann, Laura O'Brien	Ben Cork, Sharon Jephcote	Ben Cork, Sharon Jephcote (1st championship)
1990	Gary O'Brien, Joanne McKeown	Gary Allen, Sharon Jephcote	
1989	James Kershaw, Claire Telford (1st championship)	Richard Paull, Linda Smallman	
1988		Richard Gregory, Sara Martin	
1987		Richard Gregory, Sara Martin	
1986		Graham Clare, Kay Farrelly	
1985		Sammy Cooper, Sharon Elson	
1984		Timothy Brown, Jayne Peters	
1983		Timothy Brown, Nicola Drake	
1982		Mark and Michelle Burke	
1981		Mark and Michelle Burke	
1980		Warren Boote, Helena Tranter	
1979		Mark Paton, Jaqueline Davis	
1978		Barry Usher, Sharon Newman	
1977		Neil Ashton, Lynn Brassington	
1976		Martin Elly, Jayne Whitehead	
1975		Stephen Baish, Shani Smith	
1974		James Millar, Carol Pate	
1973		James Millar, Carol Pate	
1972		Kevin Marfleet, Joy Dance	
1971		Raymond Walbancke, Patricia Cornley	
1970		Paul Shaw, Joy Driver	
1969		Alan Goode, Susan Hartland	
1968		Bark Beese, Sylvia Melling	
1967		Brian Marshall, Christine Harrington	
1966		Brian Marshall, June Cross	
1965		Geoffrey Fitt, Valerie Ralph	
1964		Ian Hayward, Linda Hawkes	
1963		Robert Ashton, Dorethy Froggatt	
1962		Kenneth Walker, Marie Freestone	
1961		Brian A Alcock, Christine A Cash	
1960		Michael Belk, Anita Gent	
1959		Geoffrey Donovan, Linda Walpole	
1958		Alan Hancock, Margaret Batty	
