= English Amateur Dancesport Association =

English Amateur Dancesport Association (EADA) Ltd
- Formation: 1985
- Type: Limited Company (as of 2008)
- Headquarters: United Kingdom
- President: Tony Clipstone
- Website: eada.co.uk

The English Amateur Dancesport Association (EADA) Ltd is a volunteer-led organisation which represents the interests of Amateur Dancers (including Ballroom, Latin American, Sequence dancing and Freestyle) within England. EADA provides support and training for Amateur dancers and acts as the voice of English Amateur dancers amongst other dance organisations both in the UK and overseas. EADA also aims to get the younger audience involved and on the dance floor. EADA hopes to increase the profile of dancesport.

== History ==
EADA was formed in 1985 when the British Amateur Dancesport Association split into its constituent countries for representation on the International Dancesport Federation (IDSF). On May 29, 2008 EADA was registered as a company limited by guarantee (EADA Ltd).

== Organisation ==
EADA Ltd is run entirely by volunteers: up to five directors and five or more Council members. The current President of EADA is Mr Tony Clipstone.

As from January 2017 EADA is a Corporate Member of the British Dance Council.

The membership of EADA includes Amateur dancers of all ages and standards – from beginner through to international competitor. Typically EADA has 400 members each year. Members have to pay an annual registration fee which allows them to compete in competitions run by the British Dance Council, the largest national competitions being the British closed championships (Ballroom and Latin) and the British Sequence Championships (sequence dance). Joining also entitles members to various benefits.

== Responsibilities ==
Responsibilities are to represent English Amateurs at meetings of other dance organisations such as the BDC. EADA is also responsible for providing training days for their members, administering the Amateur coaching scheme, supporting and advising members on issues such as child protection, and keeping the membership informed about issues in the dance world through their website.

== Membership in other organisations ==
EADA is a UK Dancesport Association that is recognised by Sport England, UK Sport, the National Olympic Committee and WADA (the World Anti Doping Agency). EADA also has a child protection policy approved by the NSPCC and an equity policy approved by Sport England.

As of November 2010, EADA is no longer a member of WDSF and has no association with Dancesport England.

== See also ==
Dancesport
