= Hammersmith Palais =

Venue in Hammersmith, London, England

- "The Palais"
- Exterior sign used from 2003 to 2007.

- The Hammersmith Palais in 1969, when it was celebrating its golden jubilee.
- Interactive map of Hammersmith Palais
- Former names: Hammersmith Palais de Danse, Le Palais
- Address: 242 Shepherd's Bush Road; London W6 7NL; United Kingdom
- Coordinates: 51°29′38.6″N 00°13′26.9″W
- Owner: Howard Booker and Frank Mitchell (1919–); Mecca Leisure Group (1960–1990); Rank Group (1990–1999); Po Na Na Group (1999–2003); Barvest (2003–2006); Parkway Properties (2006–2012)
- Capacity: 2,500
- Type: Dance hall, music venue, nightclub
- Event: Entertainment

Construction
- Opened: 28 November 1919
- Closed: April 2007
- Years active: 87

The Hammersmith Palais de Danse, in its last years simply named Hammersmith Palais, was a dance hall and entertainment venue in Hammersmith, London, England that operated from 1919 until 2007. It was the first palais de danse (Note: Palais de danse is a lexical borrowing from French, meaning "dance palace", that refers to purpose-built commercial dance halls which appeared on Britain's high streets from the 1920s onwards.) to be built in Britain. In 2009, it was named by the Brecon Jazz Festival as one of twelve venues which had made the most important contributions to jazz music in the United Kingdom.

The Palais occupied a large site on the A219 at 242 Shepherd's Bush Road, London W6, near the circular system under the A4 Hammersmith flyover. The area has two London Underground stations, a bus station, and the road network at Hammersmith Broadway.

== History ==
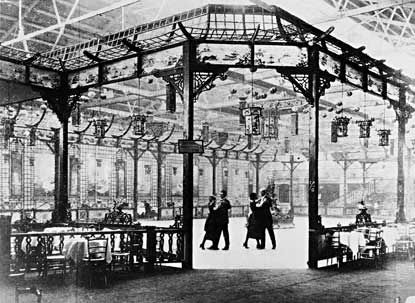
The dance floor at the Hammersmith Palais de Danse around 1919

Built in 1910 on a site formerly occupied by a tram shed for London United Tramways, the Brook Green Roller Skating Rink, which may have been closed since 1915, (Note: Advertisements for the rink ceased to appear in the local newspapers after 1915, when the building may have been devoted to wartime purposes.) was acquired at the end of the First World War by North American entrepreneurs Howard Booker and Frank Mitchell, to convert it into a place to host ballroom dancing and various kinds of dance bands, among which were the new jazz bands. This first incarnation of the Hammersmith Palais was the work of architect Bertie Crewe. Its Chinese-style decoration featured lacquered columns, fretwork and a pagoda roof with silk lanterns; in the centre of the expensive sprung dance floor, made of Canadian maple, was a model mountain with a replica Chinese village and a fountain; while at each end thereof, was a low-rise bandstand encased in glass, to allow two bands to play alternate numbers for the dancers. The venue, which also featured a restaurant and a café, was considered at the time to be the largest and most luxurious establishment of its kind in Europe. The Hammersmith Palais de Danse opening night took place on 28 November 1919. Nick LaRocca's Original Dixieland Jazz Band, in those days on tour from America, played regularly at the Palais from that first night until June 1920. Many of the famous jazz stars of the day would appear in concert there, including American jazz singer Adelaide Hall, who performed at the venue during the week from 27 March to 2 April 1939, accompanied by Fela Sowande and his Florida Club Orchestra.

During the Great Depression, while dance halls saw a reduction in attendance, ice skating came into fashion instead, and replaced dancing as the most popular leisure activity. The Palais site was therefore converted into an ice rink, which was opened on 30 December 1929, with the original London Lions ice hockey team using it as a base. However, the craze proved short-lived, and by late 1934 the rink had reverted to being a dance hall. A new maple dance floor at a cost of £5,000 was installed in the venue.

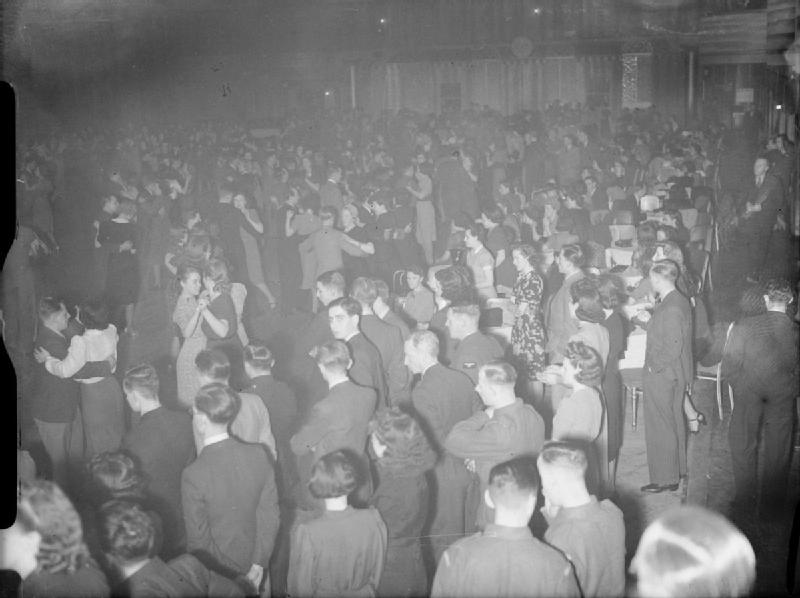
Despite the Blitz, soldiers, RAF personnel and civilians enjoy an evening of dancing at the Hammersmith Palais, spring 1941

In 1959, Joe Loss and his Orchestra, with singers Rose Brennan, Ross MacManus and Larry Gretton, became the resident dance band at the Palais. For the next decade, they were a regular feature every night, except on Monday's "Record Night" when only recorded music was played and no alcohol was served from the bar. (Note: The term discothèque, coined in the early 1940s in German-occupied France, was already current in English in the 1950s.) The stage and rehearsal room were within earshot of the Chief Superintendent's office in Hammersmith Police Station, leading one of its occupants to observe "where else can visitors to a police station be soothed by the sound of famous dance bands?". In 1960, the Mecca organisation acquired the Palais. Other house bands during the 1960s and 1970s included Andy Ross, Ken Mackintosh, Tony Evans, and Zodiac. On many Saturday nights, in excess of 2,000 people would visit the venue. One of the features was a huge revolving stage with a band on each side (this also caused a number of accidents when microphones and stands were left on the revolve).

The Hammersmith Palais remained a popular dance venue from its start to the late 1980s, from then on hosting mainly live music gigs, but also dance nights and private events. The venue accommodated the popular School-Disco club night with its resident band, On-On, which subsequently moved to the London Forum in Kentish Town. Promoters Onyx Promotions championed Brit-Asian bands and DJs, including DCS, Heera, Juggy D, Panjabi Hit Squad, Premi, RDB, Rishi Rich and Xzecutive/San-j Sanj. The Students' Union at Imperial College School of Medicine frequently hired the Palais as a venue for student nights.

The Palais played host to countless artists; among them Bill Haley & His Comets (1974), the Beatles, the Rolling Stones, The Who, David Bowie, the Sex Pistols, Elvis Costello and the Attractions, the Cure, U2, the Jesus and Mary Chain, the Fall, Robert Plant & the Strange Sensation, Hanoi Rocks, Big Bang and Kylie Minogue and the Police. "There was the night [in 1979] when we drove in an armoured military vehicle from our show at the Hammersmith Odeon to another the same night at the Hammersmith Palais," recalled Police drummer Stewart Copeland, "while the people from both concerts were all on the street."

Bands such as PiL, the Cramps and Soft Cell, who played their "farewell" concerts there in January 1984, made the venue popular for London gig-goers.

This venue also served as a stage for renowned Latin artists, including the legendary Cuban singer Celia Cruz, known as the Queen of Salsa.

From 1999 to 2003, the Palais was owned by the Po Na Na Group, which converted it into a themed nightclub called Po Na Na Hammersmith.

== Closure and demolition ==
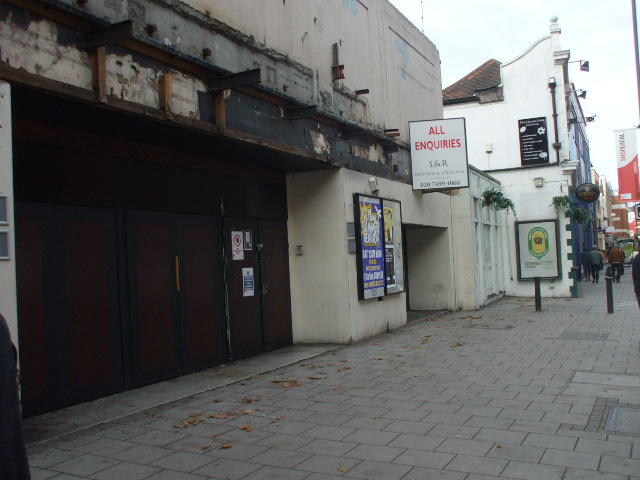
The Palais in 2008, awaiting its ultimate fate after closure

On 20 March 2007, despite its importance to Britain's cultural history, the Hammersmith Palais was condemned for demolition. Among the artists playing the last concerts at the venue were Kasabian, Idlewild, and Jamie T. On 31 March, the unnamed Damon Albarn-fronted band, informally known as The Good, the Bad & the Queen, performed a show which was promoted as the venue's official send-off. However, the following evening, 1 April (scheduled before it was known that the building was to be sold), there was a performance by the Fall, which was also promoted as the Palais' last night. A recording and a video of this concert was subsequently released as a live album titled Last Night at The Palais. In the end, none of these events was truly the last: the final gig at the Hammersmith Palais took place on 3 May 2007, and was by Groove Armada to launch their album Soundboy Rock.

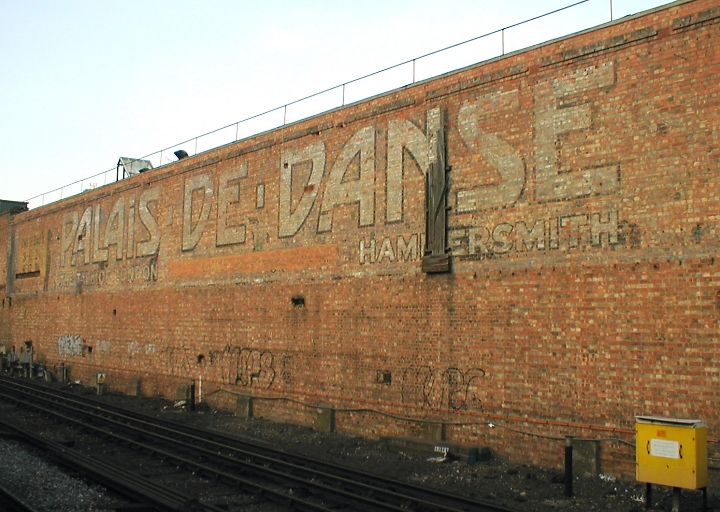
An old hand-painted advertising sign for the Hammersmith Palais de Danse on its surviving rear boundary wall, seen in 2004 from the platform of the Hammersmith underground station

Film producer and director Richard Weller made a documentary for BBC Television about the venue's history, titled Last Man at the Palais. It was first screened on BBC Four on Christmas Eve 2007. Near the end of the film, ballroom dancer Lyndon Wainwright performs "The Last Waltz" on the dance floor of the Palais.

Following its closure as a music venue, proposals for the site included use as an office and restaurant complex, or a students' hall of residence. Hammersmith and Fulham London Borough Council had been expected to rule on the proposed demolition and development in November 2009; however, on 27 October 2009, the council rejected plans to turn the Hammersmith Palais site into student flats. (Note: The full history of planning applications for the site can be found at the official website of the London Borough of Hammersmith and Fulham.)

In July 2010, the Planning Inspectorate held a week-long public inquiry and rejected an appeal by a development company against a council decision to block a proposed development. The developers were London & Regional (Hammersmith), who were given leave to submit an amended application.

The Palais was finally demolished in May 2012. A new building was constructed on the site, and in September 2013 opened as a luxury student hall of residence, advertised as being on the site of the Hammersmith Palais.

== In popular culture ==
Michael Monroe's 1993–1994 band Demolition 23 recorded a track called "Hammersmith Palais" on their 1994 self-titled album. The song, a nostalgic description of the 1980s club scene in London, was written by Monroe, Jude Wilder and Little Steven (Steven Van Zandt).

The venue provides inspiration for the Dan Wilde track "Hammersmith Palais", from his 2016 album "Rhythm on the City Wall".

The venue is named in several songs, including:

- The Emerson, Lake & Palmer song "Benny the Bouncer", from their 1973 album Brain Salad Surgery.
- The Clash song "(White Man) In Hammersmith Palais", inspired by Joe Strummer and Don Letts attending a reggae all-nighter at the venue; Strummer also managed to get thrown out one Thursday afternoon for gaining entry without permission.
- The Ian Dury and the Blockheads song "Reasons to be Cheerful, Part 3".
- The Elvis Costello and the Attractions song "London's Brilliant Parade", from their 1994 album Brutal Youth; Costello would frequently visit the Palais as a youth, watching from the balcony his father Ross MacManus perform with the Joe Loss Orchestra.

== Works cited ==
- Edwards, Tom (May 1950). "Jazz Band Ball: New Orleans to Hammersmith". Jazz Illustrated. Vol. 1, no. 6. London, United Kingdom: Wilcox Organisation. pp. 10–11. OCLC 173860453.
- Kimber, Jane; Hammersmith and Fulham Archives and Local History Centre (Autumn 2008). "'Danse' to the Music of Time" (PDF). Hammersmith and Fulham Historic Buildings Group Newsletter. No. 19. pp. 7–8.
- Nott, James (2015). Going to the Palais: A Social and Cultural History of Dancing and Dance Halls in Britain, 1918–1960. Oxford, United Kingdom: Oxford University Press. ISBN 9780199605194.
- Rust, Frances (1969). Dance in Society: An Analysis of the Relationship between the Social Dance and Society in England from the Middle Ages to the Present Day. The International Library of Sociology and Social Reconstruction (85). London, United Kingdom: Routledge & Kegan Paul. ISBN 9780710065827.
- Sadoh, Godwin (2007). The Organ Works of Fela Sowande: Cultural Perspectives. Lincoln, Nebraska: iUniverse. ISBN 9780595473175.
- Walker, Edward S. (February–March 1983). "Saturday Night at the Palais -'21". Storyville. No. 105. Chigwell, United Kingdom. pp. 108–109. ISSN 0039-2030.
- Weller, Richard (Spring 2009). "Project Palais" (PDF). Hammersmith and Fulham Historic Buildings Group Newsletter. No. 20. p. 7.

== Other media ==
- Dixon, Terence (1973). May I Have the Pleasure?: A Profile of Hammersmith Palais (TV documentary miniseries). Thames Television.
- Weller, Richard (2007). Last Man in Hammersmith Palais (TV documentary). BBC Four.
