= Ballroom Dancers' Federation =

The Ballroom Dancers' Federation is a sports organization. It was founded in 1958 to give a voice to competitive ballroom dancers.

A previous organisation, called the Competitors' Federation had been disbanded soon after its formation in 1946.

== Goals and responsibilities ==
The purpose of the BDF is:

1. To promote the spirit of good fellowship and sportsmanship and to protect and advance the interests of professional competitors and professionals in general.
2. To further the goodwill and co-operation between those who utilise the services of its members and the governing Dance Sport bodies.

These general aims are interpreted mainly from the point of view of professional competitors, though many of its activities do also benefit amateur competitors.

The Federation has been responsible for starting many events:

- The International Congress held biennially at the British Open Championships in Blackpool, where lectures on all aspects of the profession are presented.
- The Night of 100 Stars, which is the showcase for the Dance Sport industry.
- The type of world championships known as Classic Show Dance and South American Show Dance, were originally called segue events which was the innovation of the BDF.
- Twenty-five years ago, the Federation resurrected the Star Championships originally run by the now defunct Star newspaper in the famous Earls Court Exhibition Centre. Later the Championship was held in the Great Room of the Grosvenor House on Park Lane together with a dinner dance called the Star Ball.
- The BDF awards have grown to be one of the most prestigious award ceremonies in the world today.
- The Ballroom Dancers’ Federation have undertaken the responsibility of organising European and World Championship events granted by the World Dance Council to Great Britain. This has been achieved with the support of generous sponsors.

Delegates from the executive committee of the Federation sit on the board of directors for the British Dance Council; the Federation sees a major part of its role as bringing about changes in the BDC.

== See also ==
- English Amateur Dancesport Association
- BDF International https://web.archive.org/web/20091101143401/http://www.bdfi.org/index.php/en_US/welcome
