= Eileen Fowler =

British physical exercise instructor

Eileen Philippa Rose Fowler MBE
- Born: 13 May 1906; Tottenham, Middlesex, England
- Died: 7 March 2000 (aged 93); Colchester, Essex, England

Eileen Philippa Rose Fowler, MBE (13 May 1906 – 7 March 2000) was a United Kingdom physical exercise instructor. She was involved in the keep-fit craze and had a lasting career on radio and BBC television.

== Life ==
Fowler was born in Tottenham in 1906. She originally trained to act and dance despite her parents' objections. She did not appreciate the lifestyle and in the 1930s she had trained to be a keep-fit instructor at the time that exercise became a craze. In 1934 she founded the Industrial Keep Fit Organisation and she gave classes in the south of England. In the following year Phyllis Colson founded the Central Council of Physical Recreation (CCPR).

During the Second World War she was employed by the Central Council of Physical Recreation to improve the fitness of workers as she toured across the country conducting group physical training. In February 1945 she married an electrical engineer. After several years the CCPR again employed her and she and 200 women provided a show at an F.A. Cup final.

In 1954 she gave her first keep-fit broadcast. Many were exercising with her radio broadcasts at 6:45 in the morning. With the catchphrase "Down with a bounce; with a bounce, come up" she introduced fun into exercise.

She helped found the Keep Fit Association in 1956 and she ran her own "EF Fitness" classes near her house. These exercises moved on to BBC television until 1961, and after this she created exercise records that allowed people to continue to exercise at home. Alternatively, they could read Stay Young Forever which Fowler wrote in 1963. During the 1970s she appeared on TV and on radio.

In March 1974, she appeared on Desert Island Discs she chose one of her own records as her favourite and requested writing materials and The Kon-Tiki Expedition by Dr Thor Heyerdahl as her favourite book. In 1975, she was awarded an MBE.

Fowler remained fit into her 90s and would insist on displaying her suppleness to other residents at her retirement home. She died in Colchester in 2000.
