= National Association of Teachers of Dancing =

The National Association of Teachers of Dancing promotes dance and provides services to its members.

Founded in 1906, by 1912 it had 50 members; today the membership numbers around 2000. It was originally devoted to set and sequence dancing based on the five positions of the ballet. Now it is organised into a Theatre Branch and a Ballroom Branch and is a member of the British Dance Council, the Central Council of Physical Recreation, the Council for Dance Education and Training, and the International Stage Dance Council.

Although described as 'national', the association is international, with worldwide membership in 26 countries. Examiners regularly travel as far afield as Canada, Singapore, Malaysia, and Hong Kong.

== Notable events ==
In 1932, the NATD started the medal test system for amateur dancers. It was the idea of Edgar Newton and was copied by many other dance teaching organizations. This system, by giving dancers something to aim for, made for better dancing and meant financial survival for many small dance schools.

In 1938 and 1939, the Society initiated the Juvenile and Junior Championships at the Blackpool Dance Festival. This was an epoch-making moment, for until then, all ballroom dance competitions were for adults. Juvenile and Junior competitions are now a worldwide phenomenon.

In 1952, NATD was incorporated as a limited company. In 1953, Dave Jones, an NATD member, got the idea of having competitions restricted to the various medal grades. The competitors would wear normal daycloths rather than the elaborate dress of formal competition dancing. This is now widespread and popular. Another idea was to have matches between different schools of dance. That was started by Robert Morgan and Bob Barber in Essex, and has led to the formation of dance team leagues.

NATD members were authors of dancing technique books. Some examples:

- 1940: Modern Ballroom Dancing by Henry Jacques published. Detailed analysis of technique.
- 1946: Ballroom dancing for amateur tests by Carl Bryant
- 1948: Latin American dancing by Frank Borrows. This was one of the first books on Latin dance.
- 1950: Revised technique explained by Frank Borrows. This was a book for student professionals.
- 1962: Nornie Dwyer’s The Twist booklet sold out a print run of 125,000 in ten days.
- 1953: Len Scrivener edited The Complete Dancer.
- 1968: Handbook of Modern Dancing’' by Nornie Dwyer.

=== Theatre dance ===
In 1933, Maude Wells, ably assisted by Nina Hodgson, formed the National Tap Branch. 1933 also saw the establishment of the Ballet Branch. The Classical Ballet (Russian Method) was formed in 1940, attracting many famous and talented teachers. At a later stage, branches were created for Modern Stage and Stage Tap. Examinations are also available for Acrobatic, National Dance, Dance Movement and Disco.

=== New events ===
Professional and amateur examinations are held in Freestyle, Street dance, Argentine tango (Ballroom Branch); and Acrobatic and Contemporary dance (Theatre Branch). Competitions are held in inventive dance.
