= London Ski jumping competition 1950 =

Ski jumping event in London, England

London Ski jumping competitions 1950 was the first ski jumping competitions to be held in London. Snow was imported from Norway and a ski jump built on Hampstead Heath for the events. The 1950 competition took place on 24–25 March 1950. On the first day a competition was held between members of the Norwegian ski jumping team who had come over to help publicise Norway as a tourist destination. On the second day there was a competition between representatives from Oxford and Cambridge Universities. The Oxford Oxford team won this University Challenge Cup. The "London Challenge Cup"—which anyone could enter—was won by Arne Hoel of Oslo.

The event attracted a huge crowd—the BBC report says "tens of thousands of people"—and was so successful that plans were discussed for it to be repeated the following year. However, the BBC report says "The ski-jump competition was never held again, despite several attempts to revive it."

The Cinema Museum in London holds excellent film of the event. Ref HM0578.
