= British Dance Council =

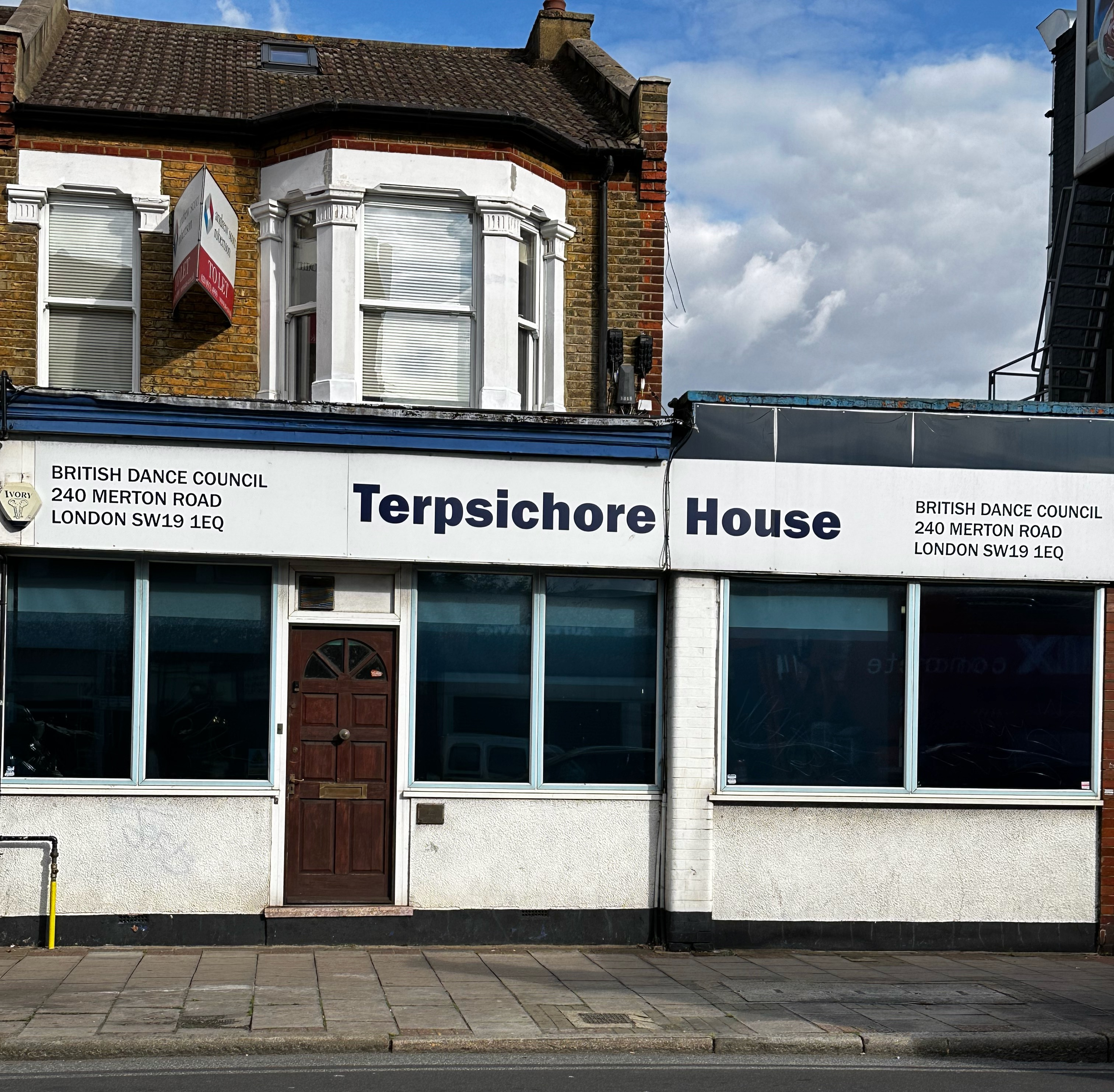
British Dance Council offices in Merton, London

The British Dance Council was formed in 1929 as the Official Board of Ballroom Dancing (OBBD). The name was changed in 1985 to the British Council of Ballroom Dancing and in 1996, the name was changed to British Dance Council. The BDC is the recognised governing body for Ballroom, Latin American, Sequence & Freestyle Disco dance in the United Kingdom.

The BDC was originally formed to establish uniformity in the teaching of Ballroom Dance nationwide, although its responsibilities are now extensive both in the UK and abroad. The primary function of the BDC is to devise and oversee the rules for competitive dancing. All dance competitions in the UK, both amateur and professional are governed by BDC rules. The BDC is also the national awarding body for championship titles in the UK.

Standardisation is another key function of the BDC. There are a number of leading dance organisations in the UK, and each of these organisations has slight differences in technique and vocabulary. The BDC works to ensure that, where possible, teachers from any organisation will be teaching dance the same way. This is particularly important competitively, to make sure that all dancers can understand and perform their dances within the BDC rules, regardless of which dance organisation they trained with.

== Members ==
Dance Teaching Organisations

- Associated Board of Dance (ABD)
- Allied Dancing Association (ADA)
- British Association of Teachers of Dance (BATD)
- International Dance Teachers Association (IDTA)
- Imperial Society of Teachers of Dancing (ISTD)
- National Association of Teachers of Dancing (NATD)
- Northern Counties Dance Teachers Association (NCDTA)
- Scottish Dance Teachers Alliance (SDTA)
- UKA Dance
- Welsh Alliance of Professional Teachers' of Dancing (WAPTD) (non-examining body)

Professional Dancers Organisations

- Ballroom Dancers Federation (BDF)
- British Competitors Dancesport Corporation (BCDC)
- Dance Promoters Association (DPA)

Amateur Dancers Organisations

- English Amateur Dancesport Association (EADA)
- Dancesport Scotland
- Welsh Amateur Dance Sport Association (WADSA)
