= Sequence dance =

Type of dance with preset movement pattern

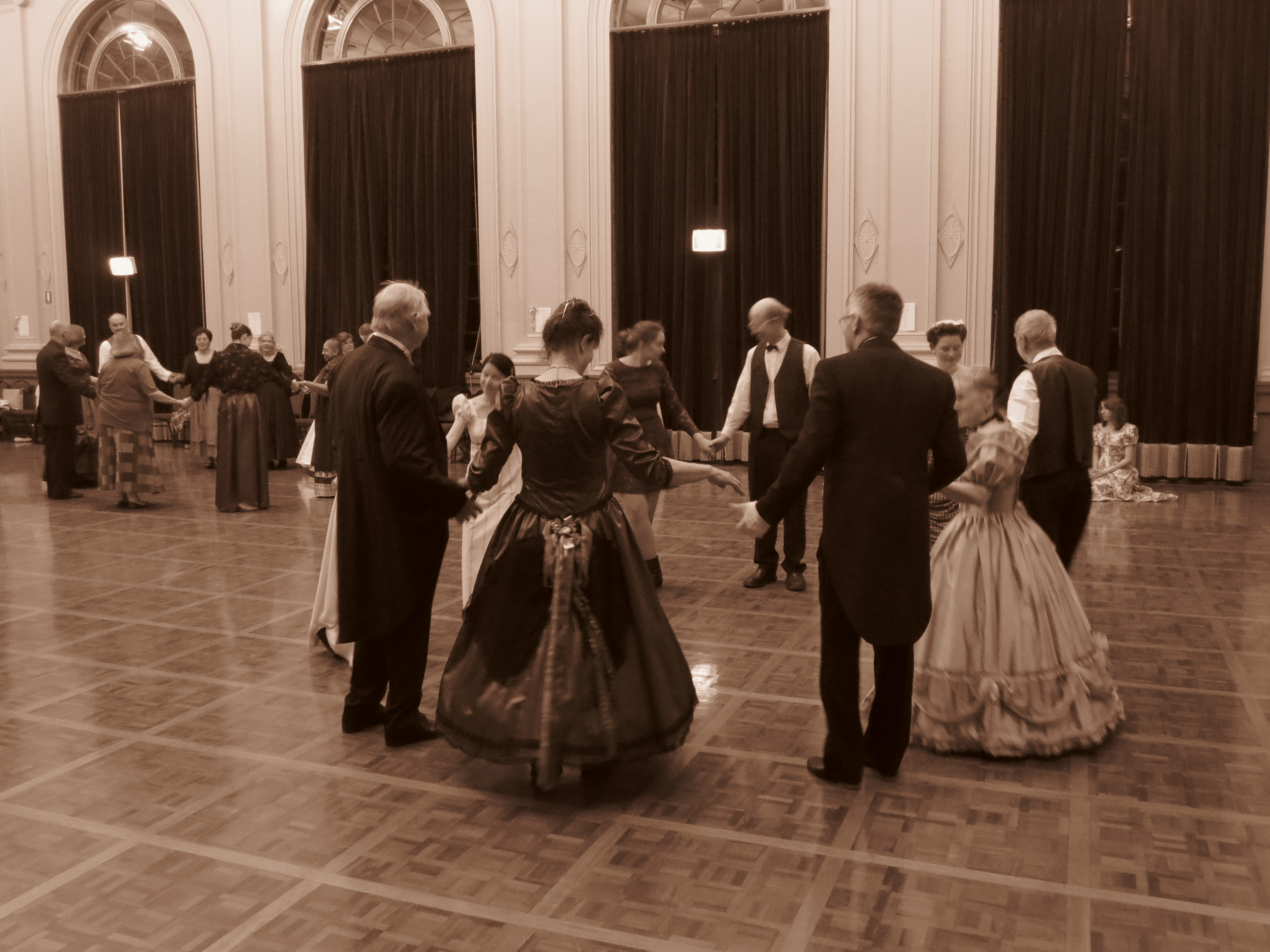
Five partner sequence dance at the Albert Hall, Canberra ( circa 2016) (sepia)

Sequence dancing is a form of dance in which a preset pattern of movements is followed, usually to music which is also predetermined. Sequence dancing may include dances of many different styles. The term may include ballroom dances which move round the floor as well as line, square and circle dances.

Sequence dancing in general is much older than modern ballroom dances. With the exception of the waltz, invented around 1800, all dances in ballrooms were sequence dances until the early 20th century. After modern ballroom dancing developed, in England, sequence dancing continued. It included so-called 'Old Time' dances and also adapted versions of the new ballroom dances, and then versions of Latin dances. Sequence dancing is a competitive sport as well as a social pastime.

The British Sequence Championships is the most famous annual sequence dance competition and is part of the Blackpool Sequence Dance Festival. This is held in the Empress Ballroom, Winter Gardens, Blackpool, England, since 1949.

== Sequence dancing today ==
Modern sequence dancing has a repeat of the steps at every sixteenth bar, typically going on for five or six sequences in all. Specially performed sequence dance music in strict tempo is usually needed, although some 'ordinary' music may suffice provided it is played in 16 bar sections or sequences throughout. Ideally, sequence music will have a four bar introduction at the correct tempo and in the correct rhythm, followed by 5 or 6 sixteen bar sequences allowing all dancers to progress around the room and ending when the music finishes.

There are many different tempo types for sequence dancing, based on the classification of each dance. Each has an accepted speed of playing so that a typical programme of sequence dancing has a wide variety of activity. Sequence dances are split into three different sections: Old Time (also occasionally seen as Old Tyme - now referred to as Classical), Modern, and Latin, with the dividing line being somewhere in the early 20th century. New sequences are being devised all the time, and the number of which have been published as scripts stands at over four thousand (as of 2010).

Old-time (Classical) dances: Old-time Waltz, Country dance, Quadrille, Galop, Polka; Saunter, Gavotte, Two Step, Mazurka, Schottische, Cakewalk.

Modern dances: Waltz, Tango, Foxtrot, Quickstep

Latin American dances: Rumba, Cha-cha-cha, Samba, Jive, Paso Doble, Bossa Nova, Salsa, Mambo.

Regular competitions are held between dance teachers to decide which newly created sequence dances shall be officially adopted and scripted for wider distribution. Most of these are tried for a short while and then disappear into the archives. Some, just a few, find great popularity and join the select group of dances which last for several years round the dance halls. Such popular dances are the basis of practically every Tea Dance. Moreover, most now consider the best dances are the older dances, and although a few clubs still teach them, interest in the new dances now seems to be rapidly diminishing.

Most people who attend these functions will recognise Saunter Together, Mayfair Quickstep, Waltz Cathrine, Rumba One, and many others. An alternative to the tea dance is the Dance Club. Dance clubs are devoted to the teaching and learning of all the approved new sequence dances.

=== New Vogue ===
New Vogue is a set of sequence dances which use modern ballroom technique. It was developed in Australia in the 1930s and is danced socially and competitively across Australia and New Zealand. There are fifteen competition dances which cover March, Foxtrot, Tango, and Viennese Waltz rhythms.

== Sequence dance scripts ==
These are written in a shorthand form similar to phone texting or knitting patterns. The jargon is easily learned and the shorthand can be understood. Ultra-keen sequence dancers subscribe to script services that distribute the scripts immediately after they are issued by the competition organisers. A short example of this dance scripting is as follows:

1. RF Fwd in CBMP (OP) comm to tn R * Side LF * Cls RF to LF to end bkng LOD. S Q Q.
2. LF bk dn LOD *RF Bk, R shldr ldg * Crs LF in front of RF S Q Q.
