= Sport and Recreation Alliance =

Sports organization in the United Kingdom

The Sport and Recreation Alliance, formerly known as the Central Council of Physical Recreation, is the representative body for national sports organisations in the United Kingdom.

The Sport and Recreation Alliance is the main body for sport and recreation in the UK. It represents over 320 member organisations.

The organisation speaks and acts to promote, protect and develop the interests of sport and physical recreation at all levels. It is completely independent of any form of government control, has no responsibility for allocating funds, is strictly non-party and will support or oppose proposed measures only on the basis of their perceived value to sport and recreation.

Its members range from large national governing bodies of sport such as the Football Association and the Rugby Football Union to smaller members such as stoolball or kitesurfing. The members are divided by activity type into one of six divisions, covering Major Spectator Sports, Outdoor Pursuits, Movement and Dance, Water Recreation and Interested Organisations. Recently the Sport and Recreation Alliance opened its membership to County Sports Partnerships.

The Sport and Recreation Alliance offers a range of services including advocacy on issues such as excessive bureaucracy in the governance of sport, access rights and events. The Central Council of Physical Recreation (CCPR), formerly the Central Council of Physical Recreative Training was established in 1935. The need and vision for such a body was seen by its founder Phyllis Colson "great woman who left an ineradicable mark upon the development of physical recreation in this country". This umbrella body brought together the many assorted sports bodies together with youth organisations, education authorities and industrial firms in pooling their knowledge experience and resources in providing every youngster with a chance to take part in enjoyable and health-giving physical activity.

During WW2 the alliance employed Eileen Fowler to improve the fitness of workers as she toured across the country conducting group physical training. After the war and Fowler's marriage the Central Council of Physical Recreation again employed her and this resulted in 200 women providing a show at an F.A. Cup final. Fowler was to go on to lead keep fit activities on BBC TV and radio.

In 1950, together with the Ski Club of Great Britain and the Oslo Ski Association, the central council organised the London Ski jumping competition 1950.
