= British Association of Teachers of Dancing =

- Abbreviation: BATD
- Formation: 1892
- Purpose: Dance teaching and examination board
- Headquarters: Pavilion 8 - Upper Level; Watermark Business Park; 315 Govan Road; Glasgow; Scotland; G51 2SE; UK
- Region served: United Kingdom and Overseas
- President: Elma Whyte
- Main organ: Board of Directors
- Affiliations: • British Dance Council • Council for Dance Education & Training • Theatre Dance Council International
- Website: www.batd.co.uk

The British Association of Teachers of Dance (BATD) is a UK-based dance examination board, with its Head Office in Glasgow, Scotland. The officially recognised date for the formation of the society is 30 November 1892, making it the first professional dance organization of its kind in the United Kingdom, and the second oldest in the world.

== History of the BATD ==
Founded in 1892, the BATD became the first UK dance association of its kind to encourage the organisation of dance professionals into an organised society. The association may have been in operation earlier than this, however 30 November 1892 is the first recorded date that can be established beyond doubt (see BATD website).

There were 24 founder members recorded in 1892, with an estimated 3,500 members registered by the year 1999.

The British Association is represented in the following countries:

- United Kingdom
- Malta
- Canada
- United States of America
- Australia
- South Africa
- Spain
- France
- Italy
- Netherlands
- Germany
- Belarus
- Latvia
- South Korea

The BATD is represented in many other countries, but this list shows those countries where there are a notable number of registered members or where regular meetings of the association are held.

== Configuration of the Society ==
The Society is managed by a president, vice-presidents, trustees treasurer and an executive council. These are all elected positions, which are balloted at the societies annual conference. There are various other regional or district committees, which organize meetings, lectures, seminars and other events for the membership in their district. These positions are nominated and elected by the membership of each district and include a chairperson, vice-chairperson, secretary, treasurer and marshall. Members of the society can seek higher office, first at regional level then at the executive level.

Diane Barron was the president of the association from 2001 to 2005.

== Branches ==
The primary work of the society is to provide examination syllabi in various dance styles. There are a number of branches within the society that each specialise in a specific dance subject. They are:

- Tap
- Stage (known as Theatre or Stage Craft in other organisations)
- Ballet
- Highland
- Modern Dance
- Jazz
- Acrobatic Dance
- Hornpipe
- Jig
- Traditional Step Dancing
- European National Ballroom
- Latin American
- Classical
- Disco
- Rock'n'Roll
- Country and Western
- Scottish Country Dance
- Dance Exercise
- Scottish National Dance
- Majorette
- Dance and Drama
- Special Needs Awards

A range of examinations and awards are available in each dance discipline for children of all ages. These are typically organized into grades or medal tests, with the work being assessed by a BATD registered examiner. As well as these examinations for children, the society also offers training for adults and teacher training for dance professionals who wish to become a registered teacher with the BATD.
